= 2012 Horizon Laser Vision Center Classic =

- Host city: Regina, Saskatchewan
- Arena: Tartan Curling Club
- Dates: September 28 – October 1
- Winner: (China) Zou Dejia
- Skip: Zou Dejia
- Third: Chen Lu'an
- Second: Ji Yangsong
- Lead: Li Guangxu
- Finalist: (Saskatchewan) Brent Gedak

The 2012 Horizon Laser Vision Center Classic was held from September 28 to October 1 at the Tartan Curling Club in Regina, Saskatchewan as part of the 2012–13 World Curling Tour. The event was held in a triple-knockout format, and the purse for the event was CAD$16,000.

== Teams ==
Teams are announced as follows.

One women's team entered the event (Michelle Englot). The rest are men's teams.

| Skip | Third | Second | Lead | Locale |
|---|---|---|---|---|
| Scott Bitz | Jeff Sharp | Aryn Schmidt | Dean Hicke | Regina, Saskatchewan |
| William Coutts | | | | Regina, Saskatchewan |
| Lana Vey (fourth) | Michelle Englot (skip) | Roberta Materi | Sarah Slywka | Regina, Saskatchewan |
| Brent Gedak | John Aston | Derek Owens | Malcolm Vanstone | Estevan, Saskatchewan |
| Josh Heidt | Brock Montgomery | Matt Lang | Dustin Kidby | Kerrobert, Saskatchewan |
| Clint Dieno (fourth) | Jason Jacobson (skip) | Matt Froehlich | Chadd McKenzie | Saskatoon, Saskatchewan |
| Joel Jordison | Jason Ackerman | Brent Goeres | Curtis Horwath | Moose Jaw, Saskatchewan |
| David Kraichy | Andrew Irving | Brad Van Walleghem | Curtis Atkins | Winnipeg, Manitoba |
| Clint Krismer | Kevin Fetsch | Bob Sonder | Garry Janz | Regina, Saskatchewan |
| Liu Rui | Xu Xiaoming | Zang Jialiang | Ba Dexin | Harbin, China |
| Scott Manners | Tyler Lang | Ryan Deis | Mike Armstrong | North Battleford, Saskatchewan |
| Bob Ramsay | | | | Regina, Saskatchewan |
| Daniel Selke | | | | Regina, Saskatchewan |
| Garret Vey | Mitch Criton | Sheldon Obst | Ray Sthamann | Regina, Saskatchewan |
| Jeremy Hodges (fourth) | Matt Willerton (skip) | Craig MacAlpine | Chris Evernden | Edmonton, Alberta |
| Zou Dejia | Chen Lu'an | Ji Yangsong | Li Guangxu | Harbin, China |

== Knockout results ==
The draw is listed as follows:

=== A event ===
| First Knockout | | Semifinals | | Qualifier 1 |
| (Saskatchewan) Scott Bitz | 10 |
| (Saskatchewan) Bob Ramsay | 3 | (Saskatchewan) Scott Bitz | 8 |
| (Alberta) Matt Willerton | 4 | (China) Liu Rui | 5 |
| (China) Liu Rui | 5 | | | (Saskatchewan) Scott Bitz | 4 |
| (Saskatchewan) Josh Heidt | 3 | | | (Saskatchewan) Garret Vey | 1 |
| (Saskatchewan) Garret Vey | 4 | (Saskatchewan) Garret Vey | 4 |
| (Manitoba) David Kraichy | 7 | (Manitoba) David Kraichy | 2 |
| (Saskatchewan) Joel Jordison | 6 |

| First Knockout | | Semifinals | | Qualifier 2 |
| (Saskatchewan) Brent Gedak | 3 |
| (China) Zou Dejia | 5 | (China) Zou Dejia | 7 |
| (Saskatchewan) Daniel Selke | 1 | (Saskatchewan) Michelle Englot | 0 |
| (Saskatchewan) Michelle Englot | 6 | | | (China) Zou Dejia | 4 |
| (Saskatchewan) Jason Jacobson | 1 | | | (Saskatchewan) William Coutts | 3 |
| (Saskatchewan) William Coutts | 8 | (Saskatchewan) William Coutts | 7 |
| (Saskatchewan) Clint Krismer | 4 | (Saskatchewan) Clint Krismer | 3 |
| (Saskatchewan) Scott Manners | 3 |

=== B event ===
Second Knockout
(Saskatchewan) Bob Ramsay | 9
(Alberta) Matt Willerton | 4
(Saskatchewan) Josh Heidt | 4
(Saskatchewan) Joel Jordison | 2

Quarterfinals
(Saskatchewan) Clint Krismer | 9
(Saskatchewan) Bob Ramsay | 3
(Saskatchewan) Michelle Englot | 4
(Saskatchewan) Josh Heidt | 6

Semifinals
(Saskatchewan) Clint Krismer | 3
(Saskatchewan) Josh Heidt | 4

Qualifier 3
(Saskatchewan) Josh Heidt | 8
(Saskatchewan) Garret Vey | 1

Second Knockout
(Saskatchewan) Brent Gedak | 9
(Saskatchewan) Daniel Selke | 2
(Saskatchewan) Jason Jacobson | 5
(Saskatchewan) Scott Manners | 2

Quarterfinals
(Manitoba) David Kraichy | 2
(Saskatchewan) Brent Gedak | 7
(China) Liu Rui | 4
(Saskatchewan) Jason Jacobson | 3

Semifinals
(Saskatchewan) Brent Gedak | 2
(China) Liu Rui | 7

Qualifier 4
(China) Liu Rui | 5
(Saskatchewan) William Coutts | 1

=== C event ===
| Third Knockout | | Qualifier 5 |
| (Alberta) Matt Willerton | 1 |
| (Saskatchewan) Jason Jacobson | 5 | (Saskatchewan) Jason Jacobson | 9 |
| | | (Saskatchewan) Clint Krismer | 0 |

| Third Knockout | | Qualifier 6 |
| (Saskatchewan) Daniel Selke | 4 |
| (Saskatchewan) Scott Manners | 9 | (Saskatchewan) Scott Manners | 10 |
| | | (Saskatchewan) Garret Vey | 4 |

| Third Knockout | | Qualifier 7 |
| (Saskatchewan) Joel Jordison | 3 |
| (Manitoba) David Kraichy | 4 | (Manitoba) David Kraichy | 2 |
| | | (Saskatchewan) Brent Gedak | 7 |

| Third Knockout | | Qualifier 8 |
| (Saskatchewan) Bob Ramsay | 3 |
| (Saskatchewan) Michelle Englot | 7 | (Saskatchewan) Michelle Englot | 2 |
| | | (Saskatchewan) William Coutts | 7 |

== Playoffs ==
Quarterfinals
(Saskatchewan) Scott Bitz | 6
(Saskatchewan) Jason Jacobson | 2
(Saskatchewan) Josh Heidt | 3
(Saskatchewan) Brent Gedak | 6
(China) Zou Dejia | 7
(Saskatchewan) Scott Manners | 4
(China) Liu Rui | W
(Saskatchewan) William Coutts | L

Semifinals
(Saskatchewan) Scott Bitz | 5
(Saskatchewan) Brent Gedak | 6
(China) Zou Dejia | 4
(China) Liu Rui | 1

Final
(Saskatchewan) Brent Gedak | 1
(China) Zou Dejia | 8
