= Curling at the 2010 Winter Olympics – Men's tournament =

Curling - Men's tournament at the XXI Olympic Winter Games
- Venue: Vancouver Olympic/Paralympic Centre
- Dates: February 16–27, 2010

Medalists
1st place, gold medalist(s)		Canada
2nd place, silver medalist(s)		Norway
3rd place, bronze medalist(s)		Switzerland

The men's curling tournament took place at the Vancouver Olympic/Paralympic Centre. The draws took place between 16 and 25 February 2010 and the final took place on 27 February 2010. The preliminary round was a round-robin tournament between all 10 teams; the top four qualified for the medal round.

== Teams ==
The teams are listed as follows:

Canada	China	Denmark	France	Germany
Saville SC, Edmonton: Skip: Kevin Martin; Third: John Morris; Second: Marc Kennedy; Lead: Ben Hebert; Alternate: Adam Enright	Harbin CC, Harbin: Fourth: Liu Rui; Skip: Wang Fengchun*; Second: Xu Xiaoming; Lead: Zang Jialiang; Alternate: Li Hongchen	Hvidovre CC, Hvidovre: Fourth: Johnny Frederiksen; Skip: Ulrik Schmidt*; Second: Bo Jensen; Lead: Lars Vilandt; Alternate: Mikkel Poulsen	Chamonix CC, Chamonix: Skip: Thomas Dufour; Third: Tony Angiboust; Second: Jan Ducroz; Lead: Richard Ducroz; Alternate: Raphael Mathieu	CC Füssen, Füssen: Skip: Andy Kapp; Third: Andreas Lang; Second: Holger Höhne; Lead: Andreas Kempf; Alternate: Daniel Herberg
Great Britain	Norway	Sweden	Switzerland	United States
Lockerbie CC, Lockerbie: Skip: David Murdoch; Third: Ewan MacDonald; Second: Peter Smith; Lead: Euan Byers; Alternate: Graeme Connal	Snarøen CK, Bærum: Skip: Thomas Ulsrud; Third: Torger Nergård; Second: Christoffer Svae; Lead: Håvard Vad Petersson; Alternate: Thomas Løvold	Karlstads CK, Karlstad: Skip: Niklas Edin; Third: Sebastian Kraupp; Second: Fredrik Lindberg; Lead: Viktor Kjäll; Alternate: Oskar Eriksson	CC St. Galler Bär, St. Gallen: Fourth: Ralph Stöckli; Third: Jan Hauser; Skip: Markus Eggler**; Lead: Simon Strübin; Alternate: Toni Müller	Duluth CC, Duluth: Skip: John Shuster; Third: Jason Smith; Second: Jeff Isaacson; Lead: John Benton; Alternate: Chris Plys

*Throws third rocks
**Throws second rocks

== Standings ==
Final round robin standings
Team	Skip	Pld	W	L	PF	PA	EW	EL	BE	SE	S%	Qualification
Canada	Kevin Martin	9	9	0	75	36	36	28	14	2	85%	Playoffs
Norway	Thomas Ulsrud	9	7	2	64	43	40	32	15	7	84%	Playoffs
Switzerland	Ralph Stöckli	9	6	3	53	44	35	33	20	8	81%	Playoffs
Sweden	Niklas Edin	9	5	4	50	52	34	36	20	6	82%	Tiebreaker
Great Britain	David Murdoch	9	5	4	57	44	35	29	20	9	81%	Tiebreaker
Germany	Andy Kapp	9	4	5	48	60	35	38	11	9	75%	
France	Thomas Dufour	9	3	6	37	63	22	34	16	7	73%	
China	Wang Fengchun	9	2	7	52	60	37	37	9	7	77%	
Denmark	Ulrik Schmidt	9	2	7	45	63	31	29	12	6	78%	
United States	John Shuster	9	2	7	43	59	32	41	18	9	76%	

=== Results ===
Team	CAN	CHN	DEN	FRA	GER	GBR	NOR	SWE	SUI	USA
Canada	—	10–3	10–3	12–5	9–4	7–6	7–6	7–3	6–4	7–2
China	3–10	—	8–1	5–6	6–7	4–9	5–7	5–6	5–9	11–5
Denmark	3–10	1–8	—	5–6	9–5	6–9	3–6	6–7	5–6	7–6
France	5–12	6–5	6–5	—	4–9	4–9	2–9	5–4	2–6	3–4
Germany	4–9	7–6	5–9	9–4	—	2–8	4–7	3–6	7–6	7–5
Great Britain	6–7	9–4	9–6	9–4	8–2	—	5–9	4–6	3–4	4–2
Norway	6–7	7–5	6–3	9–2	7–4	9–5	—	7–8	7–4	6–5
Sweden	3–7	6–5	7–6	4–5	6–3	6–4	8–7	—	3–7	7–8
Switzerland	4–6	9–5	6–5	6–2	6–7	4–3	4–7	7–3	—	7–6
United States	2–7	5–11	6–7	4–3	5–7	2–4	5–6	8–7	6–7	—

== Draws ==
=== Draw 1 ===
Tuesday, February 16, 9:00 AM

Sheet A	1	2	3	4	5	6	7	8	9	10	Final
Great Britain (Murdoch)	0	1	0	0	0	0	1	0	2	0	4
Sweden (Edin)	0	0	2	0	0	1	0	2	0	1	6

Sheet B	1	2	3	4	5	6	7	8	9	10	11	Final
Norway (Ulsrud)	0	0	1	0	3	0	0	0	0	2	0	6
Canada (Martin)	0	3	0	2	0	0	0	0	1	0	1	7

Sheet C	1	2	3	4	5	6	7	8	9	10	Final
United States (Shuster)	0	1	0	2	0	0	1	0	1	0	5
Germany (Kapp)	1	0	2	0	1	1	0	2	0	0	7

Sheet D	1	2	3	4	5	6	7	8	9	10	Final
Switzerland (Stöckli)	0	0	0	1	1	0	4	0	0	0	6
Denmark (Schmidt)	0	0	0	0	0	1	0	2	1	1	5

=== Draw 2 ===
Tuesday, February 16, 7:00 PM

Sheet A	1	2	3	4	5	6	7	8	9	10	Final
Canada (Martin)	2	0	0	0	2	0	3	0	2	x	9
Germany (Kapp)	0	0	2	0	0	1	0	1	0	x	4

Sheet B	1	2	3	4	5	6	7	8	9	10	Final
China (Wang)	0	0	0	1	0	0	3	0	1	0	5
France (Dufour)	1	0	0	0	1	2	0	0	0	2	6

Sheet D	1	2	3	4	5	6	7	8	9	10	11	Final
United States (Shuster)	0	0	0	1	0	0	2	0	2	0	0	5
Norway (Ulsrud)	0	1	0	0	1	0	0	2	0	1	1	6

=== Draw 3 ===
Wednesday, February 17, 2:00 PM

Sheet A	1	2	3	4	5	6	7	8	9	10	Final
Great Britain (Murdoch)	1	2	1	0	2	0	0	1	2	x	9
France (Dufour)	0	0	0	2	0	1	1	0	0	x	4

Sheet B	1	2	3	4	5	6	7	8	9	10	11	Final
United States (Shuster)	0	0	0	2	1	1	1	1	0	0	0	6
Switzerland (Stöckli)	2	1	1	0	0	0	0	0	1	1	1	7

Sheet C	1	2	3	4	5	6	7	8	9	10	Final
Denmark (Schmidt)	0	1	0	0	0	0	0	x	x	x	1
China (Wang)	1	0	3	2	1	0	1	x	x	x	8

Sheet D	1	2	3	4	5	6	7	8	9	10	Final
Germany (Kapp)	1	0	0	1	1	0	0	0	0	0	3
Sweden (Edin)	0	0	2	0	0	1	0	1	0	2	6

=== Draw 4 ===
Thursday, February 18, 9:00 AM

Sheet A	1	2	3	4	5	6	7	8	9	10	11	Final
Denmark (Schmidt)	0	2	0	1	0	0	1	1	0	1	1	7
United States (Shuster)	1	0	2	0	0	2	0	0	1	0	0	6

Sheet B	1	2	3	4	5	6	7	8	9	10	Final
Germany (Kapp)	0	1	0	1	0	1	0	0	1	0	4
Norway (Ulsrud)	1	0	2	0	2	0	1	0	0	1	7

Sheet C	1	2	3	4	5	6	7	8	9	10	Final
Canada (Martin)	2	0	0	0	3	1	0	0	1	x	7
Sweden (Edin)	0	0	0	1	0	0	1	1	0	x	3

Sheet D	1	2	3	4	5	6	7	8	9	10	Final
Great Britain (Murdoch)	1	0	0	2	0	0	0	0	0	0	3
Switzerland (Stöckli)	0	0	2	0	0	0	0	1	0	1	4

=== Draw 5 ===
Thursday, February 18, 7:00 PM

Sheet A	1	2	3	4	5	6	7	8	9	10	11	Final
Sweden (Edin)	0	1	0	0	0	2	0	1	1	0	1	6
China (Wang)	1	0	1	1	0	0	1	0	0	1	0	5

Sheet B	1	2	3	4	5	6	7	8	9	10	Final
Great Britain (Murdoch)	0	0	2	0	1	0	0	3	0	3	9
Denmark (Schmidt)	0	1	0	1	0	2	0	0	2	0	6

Sheet C	1	2	3	4	5	6	7	8	9	10	Final
Norway (Ulsrud)	2	0	0	1	0	1	0	1	0	2	7
Switzerland (Stöckli)	0	0	1	0	1	0	1	0	1	0	4

Sheet D	1	2	3	4	5	6	7	8	9	10	Final
France (Dufour)	0	0	2	0	1	1	1	0	x	x	5
Canada (Martin)	1	3	0	5	0	0	0	3	x	x	12

=== Draw 6 ===
Friday, February 19, 2:00 PM

Sheet A	1	2	3	4	5	6	7	8	9	10	Final
Germany (Kapp)	0	0	1	0	1	1	1	0	3	0	7
Switzerland (Stöckli)	2	0	0	2	0	0	0	1	0	1	6

Sheet B	1	2	3	4	5	6	7	8	9	10	Final
Denmark (Schmidt)	1	0	1	0	1	0	x	x	x	x	3
Canada (Martin)	0	2	0	5	0	3	x	x	x	x	10

Sheet C	1	2	3	4	5	6	7	8	9	10	Final
France (Dufour)	0	0	0	1	0	0	2	0	0	0	3
United States (Plys)	0	0	0	0	1	0	0	0	2	1	4

Sheet D	1	2	3	4	5	6	7	8	9	10	Final
Norway (Ulsrud)	1	0	1	0	0	1	0	2	0	2	7
China (Wang)	0	1	0	1	0	0	1	0	2	0	5

=== Draw 7 ===
Saturday, February 20, 9:00 AM

Sheet A	1	2	3	4	5	6	7	8	9	10	Final
Norway (Ulsrud)	0	1	0	2	0	0	0	3	0	x	6
Denmark (Schmidt)	0	0	1	0	1	0	0	0	1	x	3

Sheet B	1	2	3	4	5	6	7	8	9	10	Final
France (Dufour)	0	0	3	1	0	0	0	0	x	x	4
Germany (Kapp)	2	0	0	0	2	1	2	2	x	x	9

Sheet C	1	2	3	4	5	6	7	8	9	10	Final
China (Wang)	0	0	1	0	1	0	0	2	0	x	4
Great Britain (Murdoch)	1	0	0	2	0	3	2	0	1	x	9

Sheet D	1	2	3	4	5	6	7	8	9	10	11	Final
Sweden (Edin)	0	0	1	0	2	0	3	0	0	1	0	7
United States (Shuster)	1	1	0	2	0	1	0	0	2	0	1	8

=== Draw 8 ===
Saturday, February 20, 7:00 PM

Sheet B	1	2	3	4	5	6	7	8	9	10	Final
Switzerland (Stöckli)	0	0	2	0	3	0	2	0	2	x	9
China (Wang)	0	1	0	2	0	1	0	1	0	x	5

Sheet C	1	2	3	4	5	6	7	8	9	10	Final
Sweden (Edin)	1	0	2	0	0	0	1	0	0	0	4
France (Dufour)	0	2	0	0	0	0	0	0	2	1	5

Sheet D	1	2	3	4	5	6	7	8	9	10	Final
Canada (Martin)	0	2	0	1	0	2	0	0	0	2	7
Great Britain (Murdoch)	0	0	3	0	1	0	1	1	0	0	6

=== Draw 9 ===
Sunday, February 21, 2:00 PM

Sheet A	1	2	3	4	5	6	7	8	9	10	Final
United States (Shuster)	0	1	0	0	0	0	0	1	0	0	2
Great Britain (Murdoch)	0	0	0	0	2	1	0	0	0	1	4

Sheet B	1	2	3	4	5	6	7	8	9	10	Final
Norway (Ulsrud)	2	0	0	2	0	2	0	1	0	0	7
Sweden (Edin)	0	3	0	0	1	0	2	0	1	1	8

Sheet C	1	2	3	4	5	6	7	8	9	10	Final
Switzerland (Stöckli)	0	1	0	0	0	1	0	2	0	0	4
Canada (Martin)	2	0	1	0	0	0	2	0	0	1	6

Sheet D	1	2	3	4	5	6	7	8	9	10	Final
Denmark (Schmidt)	1	0	0	4	1	0	2	0	1	x	9
Germany (Kapp)	0	2	0	0	0	2	0	1	0	x	5

=== Draw 10 ===
Monday, February 22, 9:00 AM

Sheet A	1	2	3	4	5	6	7	8	9	10	Final
France (Dufour)	0	0	0	1	0	1	0	0	x	x	2
Norway (Ulsrud)	1	1	1	0	1	0	3	2	x	x	9

Sheet B	1	2	3	4	5	6	7	8	9	10	Final
Canada (Martin)	0	1	0	2	0	1	1	0	2	x	7
United States (Shuster)	1	0	1	0	0	0	0	0	0	x	2

Sheet C	1	2	3	4	5	6	7	8	9	10	Final
Germany (Kapp)	0	0	1	0	2	1	0	2	0	1	7
China (Wang)	2	1	0	1	0	0	1	0	1	0	6

Sheet D	1	2	3	4	5	6	7	8	9	10	Final
Switzerland (Stöckli)	1	1	0	2	0	0	0	0	3	x	7
Sweden (Edin)	0	0	2	0	0	0	1	0	0	x	3

=== Draw 11 ===
Monday, February 22, 7:00 PM

Sheet B	1	2	3	4	5	6	7	8	9	10	Final
Germany (Kapp)	0	0	0	0	1	0	1	0	x	x	2
Great Britain (Murdoch)	1	0	1	2	0	2	0	2	x	x	8

Sheet C	1	2	3	4	5	6	7	8	9	10	11	Final
France (Dufour)	1	1	0	2	0	0	0	0	1	0	1	6
Denmark (Schmidt)	0	0	1	0	3	0	0	0	0	1	0	5

Sheet D	1	2	3	4	5	6	7	8	9	10	Final
China (Li)	3	0	1	1	0	0	3	0	3	x	11
United States (Shuster)	0	2	0	0	1	1	0	1	0	x	5

=== Draw 12 ===
Tuesday, February 23, 2:00 PM

Sheet A	1	2	3	4	5	6	7	8	9	10	Final
China (Li)	0	1	0	1	0	1	0	x	x	x	3
Canada (Martin)	4	0	1	0	1	0	4	x	x	x	10

Sheet B	1	2	3	4	5	6	7	8	9	10	Final
Sweden (Edin)	3	0	2	1	0	0	0	0	0	1	7
Denmark (Schmidt)	0	1	0	0	2	1	1	0	1	0	6

Sheet C	1	2	3	4	5	6	7	8	9	10	Final
Great Britain (Murdoch)	0	3	0	1	0	0	0	1	x	x	5
Norway (Ulsrud)	2	0	2	0	2	0	3	0	x	x	9

Sheet D	1	2	3	4	5	6	7	8	9	10	Final
Switzerland (Stöckli)	2	0	0	0	0	2	1	1	0	x	6
France (Dufour)	0	0	0	1	0	0	0	0	1	x	2

== Tiebreaker ==
Wednesday, February 24, 2:00 PM

Sheet A	1	2	3	4	5	6	7	8	9	10	11	Final
Sweden (Edin)	2	0	2	1	0	0	0	1	0	0	1	7
Great Britain (Murdoch)	0	2	0	0	1	1	1	0	0	1	0	6

Player Percentages
Sweden		Great Britain	
Viktor Kjäll	82%	Euan Byers	70%
Fredrik Lindberg	78%	Peter Smith	75%
Sebastian Kraupp	80%	Ewan MacDonald	82%
Niklas Edin	85%	David Murdoch	75%
Total	81%	Total	76%

== Medal round ==
Tiebreaker
5	Great Britain	6
4	Sweden	7

Semi-final
1	Canada	6
4	Sweden	3
2	Norway	7
3	Switzerland	5

Final
1	Canada	6
2	Norway	3

Bronze medal
4	Sweden	4
3	Switzerland	5

=== Semi-finals ===
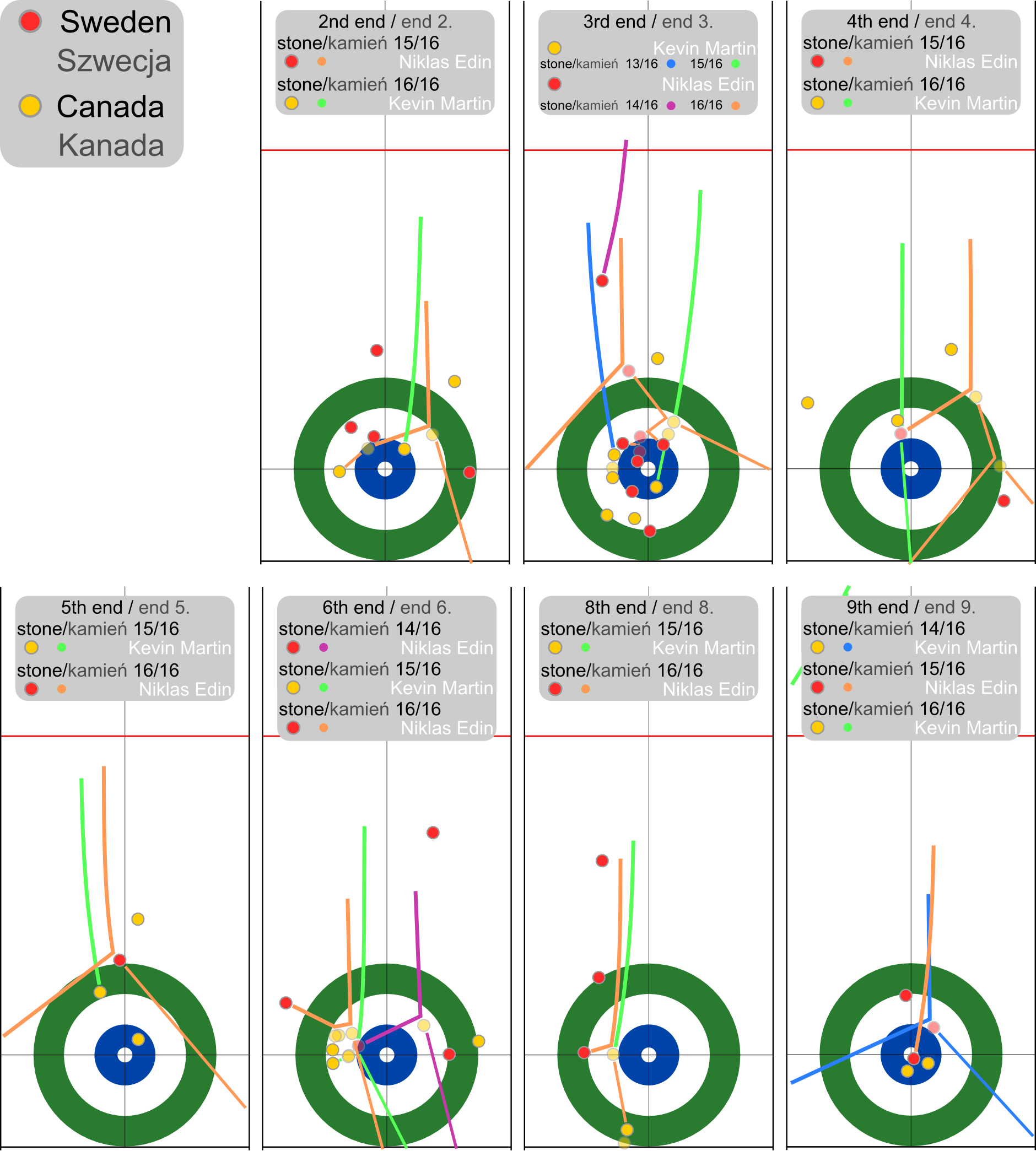

Thursday, February 25, 2:00 PM

Sheet B	1	2	3	4	5	6	7	8	9	10	Final
Sweden (Edin)	0	0	1	0	0	0	0	1	1	x	3
Canada (Martin)	0	1	0	1	2	2	0	0	0	x	6

Player percentages Each shot is marked out of 4
Player	1		2		3		4		5		6		7		8		9		10		%
Canada																					85.67%
Ben Hebert	4	4	4	4	4	4	4	0	4	2	4	3	3	3	4	4	4	4	X	X	87.50%
Marc Kennedy	3	4	2	4	2	2	4	2	2	3	4	4	4	4	4	4	4	4	4	4	85.00%
John Morris	4	4	4	0	2	2	3	3	4	3	3	3	4	4	4	4	4	4	4	4	83.75%
Kevin Martin	2	4	4	4	0	3	4	4	4	3	4	4	4	4	4	3	4	X	-	-	86.76%
Sweden																					76.28%
Viktor Kjäll	4	3	4	3	4	2	0	3	4	4	4	2	4	4	4	4	4	4	4	4	86.25%
Fredrik Lindberg	2	4	4	3	3	4	4	4	2	3	3	3	1	4	3	3	2	4	4	0	75.00%
Sebastian Kraupp	2	4	4	3	3	4	0	4	3	3	2	2	2	3	4	2	4	3	4	4	75.00%
Niklas Edin	4	2	3	4	4	0	4	4	0	0	4	1	4	4	2	3	2	4	-	-	68.06%

Sheet D	1	2	3	4	5	6	7	8	9	10	Final
Switzerland (Stöckli)	0	0	0	1	0	2	0	1	0	1	5
Norway (Ulsrud)	0	1	1	0	2	0	1	0	2	0	7

Player percentages Each shot is marked out of 4
Player	1		2		3		4		5		6		7		8		9		10		%
Norway																					91.14%
Håvard Vad Petersson	4	3	4	4	4	2	4	4	4	4	4	4	3	4	4	4	4	4	X	0	89.47%
Christoffer Svae	4	4	4	4	4	2	4	4	4	4	4	4	4	3	4	4	4	4	2	4	93.75%
Torger Nergård	3	4	2	3	4	4	4	3	4	4	4	4	3	4	4	4	4	4	4	4	92.50%
Thomas Ulsrud	4	4	3	4	2	4	4	4	4	4	2	2	2	4	4	4	4	4	4	4	88.75%
Switzerland																					85.26%
Simon Strübin	4	2	4	3	4	3	4	3	4	4	4	4	4	4	4	4	4	4	4	X*	93.42%
Markus Eggler	4	4	2	4	4	4	2	3	2	4	4	4	3	3	2	2	4	4	4	4	83.75%
Jan Hauser	2	3	3	3	3	4	3	4	3	4	4	4	4	2	2	2	4	4	2	4	80.00%
Ralph Stöckli	4	4	3	3	4	0	3	4	4	3	4	4	4	4	2	4	3	3	4	-	84.21%

* - rock picked up debris

=== Bronze medal final ===
Saturday, February 27, 9:00 AM

Team	1	2	3	4	5	6	7	8	9	10	Final
Sweden (Edin)	0	1	0	0	2	0	1	0	0	0	4
Switzerland (Stöckli)	1	0	0	1	0	1	0	0	0	2	5

Player percentages Each shot is marked out of 4
Player	1		2		3		4		5		6		7		8		9		10		%
Sweden																					79.43%
Viktor Kjäll	4	2	4	4	4	3	0	4	4	4	3	3	4	3	0	3	4	3	4	4	80.00%
Fredrik Lindberg	4	2	2	4	3	X*	3	3	4	4	4	4	0	4	4	3	3	2	2	3	76.32%
Sebastian Kraupp	4	4	2	1	0	4	4	4	4	4	4	4	4	3	4	4	0	3	4	2	78.75%
Niklas Edin	3	4	4	4	4	4	4	4	4	4	2	4	4	0	4	3	2	4	4	0	82.50%
Switzerland																					83.65%
Simon Strübin	2	4	4	3	3	3	4	3	4	4	4	2	4	4	4	3	2	4	4	3	85.00%
Markus Eggler	4	2	4	4	4	4	0	2	3	2	4	4	0	4	4	3	4	4	4	4	80.00%
Jan Hauser	4	2	3	4	3	4	4	4	4	2	3	2	2	4	2	4	4	3	2	3	78.75%
Ralph Stöckli	4	4	4	4	4	4	4	X	4	3	4	4	4	2	3	4	3	X	3	4	91.67%

* - rock picked up debris

=== Gold medal final ===
Saturday, February 27, 3:00 PM

Team	1	2	3	4	5	6	7	8	9	10	Final
Canada (Martin)	0	1	0	1	1	0	2	0	1	x	6
Norway (Ulsrud)	0	0	0	0	0	2	0	1	0	x	3

Player percentages Each shot is marked out of 4
Player	1		2		3		4		5		6		7		8		9		10		%
Canada																					85.71%
Ben Hebert	4	4	4	4	4	4	4	4	4	0	4	2	3	4	2	4	4	2	X	X	84.72%
Marc Kennedy	4	3	4	3	4	4	4	4	4	4	4	4	2	4	4	4	4	4	4	4	95.00%
John Morris	3	3	4	3	3	4	4	4	4	4	4	4	0	2	4	4	4	2	4	4	85.00%
Kevin Martin	3	X	2	4	2	2	3	4	2	3	4	3	4	4	4	3	2	4	2	4	77.63%
Norway																					84.29%
Håvard Vad Petersson	4	2	4	4	4	4	4	4	4	4	4	4	4	4	4	4	4	4	4	4	97.50%
Christoffer Svae	0	4	2	4	4	4	4	3	4	4	4	3	2	4	4	4	4	3	4	4	86.25%
Torger Nergård	4	3	4	4	4	4	2	0	2	3	3	4	4	3	4	0	4	4	4	4	80.00%
Thomas Ulsrud	3	3	4	4	4	X	2	2	2	1	4	4	4	0	0	4	4	3	4	-	72.22%

== See also ==
- Curling at the 2010 Winter Olympics
