= Zhang Zhipeng =

Chinese curler

Zhang Zhipeng 张志鹏
- Curler
- Born: 14 May 1982 (age 44); Harbin

Curling career
- World Mixed Doubles Championship: 2 (2009, 2010)
- Pacific-Asia Championship: 2 (2003, 2007)
- Other appearances: Winter Universiade: 1 (2007)
Medal record
Curling
Representing China
World Mixed Doubles Curling Championship
Bronze medal – third place	2010 Chelyabinsk
Pacific-Asia Curling Championships
Gold medal – first place	2007 Beijing

Zhang Zhipeng (Chinese: 张志鹏; born May 14, 1982, in Harbin, China) is a Chinese male curler and curling coach.

He started to play curling in 2000.

== Teams and events ==
=== Men's ===
Season	Skip	Third	Second	Lead	Alternate	Coach	Events
2003–04	Wang Haicheng	Ma Yongjun	Zhang Zhipeng	Cao Yilun	Tian Qiang	Zhang Wei	PCC 2003 (5th)
2006–07	Zou Dejia	Wang Zi	Zhang Zhipeng	Yang Tuo	Chen Lu'an	Li Hongchen	WUG 2007 (5th)
2007–08	Wang Fengchun	Xu Xiaoming	Liu Rui	Zhang Zhipeng	Zang Jialiang	Daniel Rafael, Zhang Wei	PCC 2007 (gold)
2010–11	Xu Xiaoming	Zang Jialiang	Zhang Zhipeng	Ba Dexin	Liu Rui	Daniel Rafael, Zhang Wei	

=== Mixed doubles ===
Season	Male	Female	Coach	Events
2008–09	Zhang Zhipeng	Sun Yue	Daniel Rafael	WMDCC 2009 (4th)
2009–10	Zhang Zhipeng	Sun Yue		WMDCC 2010 (bronze)

== Record as a coach of national teams ==
Year	Tournament, event	National team	Place
2012	2012 Pacific-Asia Junior Curling Championships	China (junior women)	3rd place, bronze medalist(s)
2013	2013 Pacific-Asia Junior Curling Championships	China (junior women)	2nd place, silver medalist(s)
2014	2014 Pacific-Asia Junior Curling Championships	China (junior men)	1st place, gold medalist(s)
2014	2014 World Junior Curling Championships	China (junior men)	10
2015	2015 Pacific-Asia Junior Curling Championships	China (junior women)	2nd place, silver medalist(s)
2017	2017 World Mixed Doubles Curling Championship	China (mixed doubles)	3rd place, bronze medalist(s)
2018	2018 Winter Olympics	China (mixed doubles)	4
2018	2018 World Women's Curling Championship	China (women)	7
2018	2018 Pacific-Asia Curling Championships	China (men)	2nd place, silver medalist(s)
