= 2011 DEKALB Superspiel (March) =

- Host city: Morris, Manitoba
- Arena: Morris Curling Club
- Dates: March 17–21
- Men's winner: (Alberta) Kevin Koe
- Curling club: Saville Sports Centre; Edmonton, Alberta
- Skip: Kevin Koe
- Third: Pat Simmons
- Second: Carter Rycroft
- Lead: Nolan Thiessen
- Finalist: (Manitoba) Mike McEwen
- Women's winner: (Manitoba) Chelsea Carey
- Curling club: Morden Curling Club; Morden, Manitoba
- Skip: Chelsea Carey
- Third: Kristy Jenion
- Second: Kristen Foster
- Lead: Lindsay Titheridge
- Finalist: (Manitoba) Michelle Montford

The 2011 DEKALB Superspiel was held on March 17–21 at the Morris Curling Club in Morris, Manitoba. The event featured 16 men's teams and 12 women's teams competing for a total purse of CAD$54,000. In the men's final, Kevin Koe of Alberta defeated Mike McEwen in an extra end, while Chelsea Carey defeated Michelle Montford in the women's final.

== Men ==
=== Teams ===
Skip	Third	Second	Lead	Locale
David Bohn	Dave Elias	Dennis Bohn	Larry Solomon	(Manitoba) Winnipeg
Chen Lu'an	Li Guangxu	Ji Yangsong	Guo Wenli	(China) Harbin
Pete Fenson	Shawn Rojeski	Joe Polo	Ryan Brunt	(Minnesota) Bemidji
Roger Fouasse	Joe Fouasse	Rheal Vigier	Claude Vigier	Manitoba
Rob Fowler	Allan Lyburn	Richard Daneault	Derek Samagalski	(Manitoba) Brandon
Allan Gitzel	Dwayne Gitzel	Ryan Gitzel	Gerald May	(Manitoba) Morris
Sean Grassie	Corey Chambers	Scott McCamis	Neil Kitching	(Manitoba) Winnipeg
David Hamblin	Kevin Hamblin	Kyle Einarson	Cory Janzen	(Manitoba) Morris
Lorne Hamblin	Elmer Dueck	Merl Friesen	Al Friesen	(Manitoba) Portage la Prairie
Ryan Hyde	Hartley Vanstone	Darryl Vanstone	Tom Hyde	(Manitoba) Portage la Prairie
Andrew Irving	Ryan Hlatkey	Jared Kolomaya	A.J. Girardin	(Manitoba) Winnipeg
Kevin Koe	Pat Simmons	Carter Rycroft	Nolan Thiessen	(Alberta) Edmonton
Mike McEwen	B.J. Neufeld	Matt Wozniak	Denni Neufeld	(Manitoba) Winnipeg
Richard Muntain	Mike McCaughan	Scott Barenz	Andrew Hunt	(Manitoba) Lac du Bonnet
Brian Peters	Ron Braun	Kris Mazinke	Chris Manning	(Manitoba) Morris
Daley Peters (fourth)	Vic Peters (skip)	Kyle Werenich	Brendan Taylor	(Manitoba) Winnipeg

=== Results ===
==== A Event ====
First Knockout		Semifinals		Qualifier 1
(Manitoba) McEwen	6
(Manitoba) Muntain	1	(Manitoba) McEwen	6
(Manitoba) Fouasse	5	(Manitoba) D Hamblin	3
(Manitoba) D Hamblin	7			(Manitoba) McEwen	7
(Manitoba) Bohn	5			(Manitoba) Bohn	3
(China) Chen	3	(Manitoba) Bohn	6
(Manitoba) Gitzel	2	(Minnesota) Fenson	3
(Minnesota) Fenson	7

First Knockout		Semifinals		Qualifier 2
(Manitoba) Fowler	7
(Manitoba) B Peters	4	(Manitoba) Fowler	2
(Manitoba) Irving	6	(Manitoba) Irving	5
(Manitoba) V Peters	1			(Manitoba) Irving	5
(Manitoba) Grassie	5			(Alberta) Koe	4
(Manitoba) Hyde	6	(Manitoba) Hyde	4
(Manitoba) L Hamblin	1	(Alberta) Koe	7
(Alberta) Koe	5

==== B Event ====
Second Knockout
(Manitoba) Muntain	6
(Manitoba) Fouasse	4
(China) Chen	4
(Manitoba) Gitzel	2

Quarterfinals
(Manitoba) Fowler	8
(Manitoba) Muntain	2
(Manitoba) Hyde	1
(China) Chen	9

Semifinals
(Manitoba) Fowler	5
(China) Chen	4

Qualifier 3
(Manitoba) Fowler	8
(Manitoba) Bohn	2

Second Knockout
(Manitoba) B Peters	3
(Manitoba) V Peters	6
(Manitoba) Grassie	8
(Manitoba) L Hamblin	1

Quarterfinals
(Manitoba) D Hamblin	1
(Manitoba) V Peters	8
(Minnesota) Fenson	9
(Manitoba) Grassie	4

Semifinals
(Manitoba) V Peters	3
(Minnesota) Fenson	1

Qualifier 4
(Manitoba) V Peters	5
(Alberta) Koe	4

==== C Event ====
Third Knockout
(Manitoba) L Hamblin	11
(Manitoba) Muntain	10
(Manitoba) B Peters	4
(Manitoba) Hyde	6

Quarterfinals
(Manitoba) L Hamblin	3
(Manitoba) Hyde	10

Semifinals
(Minnesota) Fenson	4
(Manitoba) Hyde	5

Qualifier 5
(Manitoba) Bohn	9
(Manitoba) Hyde	0

Third Knockout
(Manitoba) Gitzel	5
(Manitoba) D Hamblin	4
(Manitoba) Fouasse	5
(Manitoba) Grassie	7

Quarterfinals
(Manitoba) Gitzel	7
(Manitoba) Grassie	5

Semifinals
(China) Chen	4
(Manitoba) Gitzel	2

Qualifier 6
(Alberta) Koe	8
(China) Chen	1

=== Playoffs ===
Quarterfinals
(Manitoba) V Peters	7
(Manitoba) Bohn	2
(Manitoba) Fowler	4
(Alberta) Koe	5

Semifinals
(Manitoba) McEwen	5
(Manitoba) V Peters	4
(Manitoba) Irving	1
(Alberta) Koe	5

Final
(Manitoba) McEwen	4
(Alberta) Koe	5

== Women ==
=== Teams ===
Skip	Third	Second	Lead	Locale
Tara Braun	Audrey McCrady	Kristen Wiebe		Manitoba
Joelle Brown	Tracey Lavery	Lesle Cafferty	Jennifer Cawson	(Manitoba) Winnipeg
Chelsea Carey	Kristy Jenion	Kristen Foster	Lindsay Titheridge	(Manitoba) Winnipeg
Lisa DeRiviere	Sam Owen	Jolene Rutter		(Manitoba) Winnipeg
Kerri Einarson	Janice Blair	Susan Baleja	Alison Harvey	(Manitoba) Winnipeg
Jennifer Jones	Kaitlyn Lawes	Jill Officer	Dawn Askin	(Manitoba) Winnipeg
Kim Link	Maureen Bonar	Colleen Kilgallen	Renee Fletcher	(Manitoba) Brandon
Deb McCreanor	Laurie Macdonell	Stephanie Armstrong-Craplewe	Coralee Lamb	Manitoba
Michelle Montford	Courtney Blanchard	Sara Jones	Sarah Norget	Manitoba
Calleen Neufeld	Kelsey Boettcher	Heather Pierson	Lindsay Edie	(Manitoba) Winnipeg
Darcy Robertson	Amanda Tycholis	Trish Jordan	Chris Hamblin	(Manitoba) Winnipeg
Jill Thurston	Kristen Phillips	Jenna Loder	Kendra Georges	(Manitoba) Winnipeg

=== Results ===
==== A Event ====
First Knockout
(Manitoba) DeRiviere	7
(Manitoba) Neufeld	6
(Manitoba) Braun	4
(Manitoba) Montford	8

Semifinals
(Manitoba) DeRiviere	7
(Manitoba) Jones	5
(Manitoba) Einarson	4
(Manitoba) Montford	8

Qualifier 1
(Manitoba) DeRiviere	3
(Manitoba) Montford	4

First Knockout
(Manitoba) McCreanor	5
(Manitoba) Brown	8
(Manitoba) Link	7
(Manitoba) Robertson	6

Semifinals
(Manitoba) Brown	4
(Manitoba) Thurston	3
(Manitoba) Carey	7
(Manitoba) Link	5

Qualifier 2
(Manitoba) Brown	2
(Manitoba) Carey	8

==== B Event ====
Second Knockout		Semifinals		Qualifier 3
(Manitoba) Robertson	2
(Manitoba) Einarson	8	(Manitoba) Einarson	6
(Manitoba) Thurston	6	(Manitoba) Phillips	7
(Manitoba) Neufeld	2			(Manitoba) Phillips	5
				(Manitoba) DeRiviere	8

Second Knockout		Semifinals		Qualifier 4
(Manitoba) Jones	9
(Manitoba) McCreanor	0	(Manitoba) Jones	7
(Manitoba) Link	10	(Manitoba) Link	4
(Manitoba) Braun	2			(Manitoba) Jones	5
				(Manitoba) Brown	7

==== C Event ====
Third Knockout		Semifinals		Qualifier 5
				(Manitoba) Phillips	10
				(Manitoba) Link	5
		(Manitoba) Link	5
(Manitoba) Robertson	6	(Manitoba) Robertson	4
(Manitoba) Neufeld	4

Third Knockout		Semifinals		Qualifier 6
				(Manitoba) Jones	7
				(Manitoba) Einarson	3
		(Manitoba) Einarson	8
(Manitoba) McCreanor	10	(Manitoba) McCreanor	4
(Manitoba) Braun	2

=== Playoffs ===
Quarterfinals
(Manitoba) Brown	9
(Manitoba) Phillips	2
(Manitoba) DeRiviere	4
(Manitoba) Jones	7

Semifinals
(Manitoba) Montford	5
(Manitoba) Brown	1
(Manitoba) Carey	7
(Manitoba) Jones	6

Final
(Manitoba) Montford	4
(Manitoba) Carey	8
