= Ji Yansong =

Chinese male curler and coach (born 1989)

- Curler ♂
- Born: November 29, 1989 (age 36)

Team
- Curling club: Harbin CC, Harbin, Heilongjiang CC, Harbin

Curling career
- Member Association: China
- World Championship: 1 (2011)
- World Mixed Doubles Championship: 1 (2012)
- Other appearances: World Mixed Championship: 1 (2015), World Junior Championships: 3 (2008, 2009, 2010), Pacific-Asia Junior Championships: 3 (2008, 2009, 2010)
Medal record
Curling
World Mixed Championship
Bronze medal – third place	2015 Bern
Pacific-Asia Junior Championships
Gold medal – first place	2008 Jeonju City
Gold medal – first place	2009 Harbin
Gold medal – first place	2010 Nayoro

Ji Yansong (Chinese: 汲岩松; pinyin: Jí Yánsōng; born November 29, 1989) is a Chinese male curler and curling coach.

At the international level, he is a 2015 World Mixed bronze medallist and a three-time Pacific junior champion curler (2008, 2009, 2010).

== Teams ==
=== Men's ===
Season	Skip	Third	Second	Lead	Alternate	Coach	Events
2007–08	Zang Jialiang	Wang Zi	Yang Tuo	Chen Lu'an	Ji Yansong	Li Hongchen	PAJCC 2008 (gold); WJCC 2008 (8th)
2008–09	Zang Jialiang	Ji Yansong	Chen Lu'an	Li Guangxu	Huang Jihui	Li Hongchen	PAJCC 2009 (gold); WJCC 2009 (8th)
2009–10	Ji Yansong	Huang Jihui	Ba Dexin	Guo Wenli	Han Yujun	Ma Yongjun (WJCC)	PAJCC 2010 (gold); WJCC 2010 (4th)
2010–11	Ji Yansong	Chen Lu'an	Li Guangxu	Liang Shuming			
2010–11	Chen Lu'an	Li Guangxu	Ji Yansong	Guo Wenli	Ba Dexin	Li Hongchen	WCC 2011 (9th)
2012–13	Zou Dejia	Chen Lu'an	Ji Yansong	Li Guangxu			

=== Mixed ===
Season	Skip	Third	Second	Lead	Coach	Events
2015–16	Ji Yansong	Zheng Chunmei	Guo Wenli	Gao Xuesong	Wang Fengchun	WMxCC 2015 (bronze)

=== Mixed doubles ===
Season	Male	Female	Coach	Events
2011–12	Ji Yansong	Liu Sijia	Zhao Zhenzhen	WMDCC 2012 (7th)

== Record as a coach of national teams ==
Year	Tournament, event	National team	Place
2019	2019 World Junior-B Curling Championships (January)	China (junior men)	3rd place, bronze medalist(s)
2019	2019 World Junior Curling Championships	China (junior men)	9
