= 2009 World Junior Curling Championships =

- Host city: Vancouver, British Columbia, Canada
- Arena: Vancouver Olympic/Paralympic Centre
- Dates: March 5–15
- Men's winner: Denmark
- Skip: Rasmus Stjerne
- Third: Mikkel Krause
- Second: Oliver Dupont
- Lead: Troels Harry
- Alternate: Martin Poulsen
- Finalist: Canada (Brett Gallant)
- Women's winner: Scotland
- Skip: Eve Muirhead
- Third: Anna Sloan
- Second: Vicki Adams
- Lead: Sarah MacIntyre
- Alternate: Kay Adams
- Finalist: Canada (Kaitlyn Lawes)

The 2009 World Junior Curling Championships were held from 5 March 2009 to 15 March 2009 in the newly completed Vancouver Olympic/Paralympic Centre, which was the site for curling during the 2010 Vancouver Winter Olympics.

== Men ==
=== Teams ===
Country	Skip	Vice	Second	Lead	Alternate
Canada	Brett Gallant	Jamie Danbrook	Adam Casey	Anson Carmody	Stephen Burgess
China	Zang Jialiang	Ji Yansong	Chen Lu'an	Li Guangxu	Huang Jihui
Denmark	Rasmus Stjerne	Mikkel Krause	Oliver Dupont	Troels Harry	Martin Poulsen
Germany	Konstantin Kampf	Marc Bastian	Alexander Kampf	Philipp Häckelsmiller	Vincent Templin
Norway	Kristian Rolvsjord	Steffen Mellemester	Steffen Walstad	Markus Høiberg	Frode Bjerke
Russia	Andrey Drozdov	Alexey Stukalsky	Artem Boldusev	Valentin Demenkov	Victor Kornev
Scotland	Graeme Black	Thomas Sloan	Ally Fraser	Steven Mitchell	Glen Muirhead
Sweden	Kristian Lindström (fourth)	Oskar Eriksson (skip)	Alexander Lindström	Christoffer Sundgren	Henrik Leek
Switzerland	David Bartschiger	Marc Pfister	Claudio Pätz	Enrico Pfister	Roger Meier
United States	Chris Plys	Aanders Brorson	Matthew Perushek	Matthew Hamilton	Aaron Wald

=== Round-robin standings ===
Final round-robin standings

Key
Teams to Playoffs

Country	Skip	W	L
Canada	Brett Gallant	8	1
Denmark	Rasmus Stjerne	7	2
Sweden	Oskar Eriksson	7	2
United States	Chris Plys	6	3
Norway	Kristian Rolvsjord	4	5
Switzerland	David Bartschiger	4	5
Russia	Andrey Drozdov	3	6
China	Zang Jialiang	3	6
Scotland	Graeme Black	3	6
Germany	Konstantin Kampf	1	8

=== Round-robin results ===
==== Draw 1 ====
Thursday, March 5, 14:00

Sheet A	1	2	3	4	5	6	7	8	9	10	11	Final
Norway (Rolvsjord) 🔨	0	1	0	0	0	0	1	1	0	2	0	5
Canada (Gallant)	0	0	1	0	1	1	0	0	2	0	1	6

Sheet B	1	2	3	4	5	6	7	8	9	10	Final
Sweden (Eriksson) 🔨	0	1	0	0	2	0	0	2	3	X	8
Russia (Drozdov)	0	0	0	1	0	2	0	0	0	X	3

Sheet C	1	2	3	4	5	6	7	8	9	10	Final
Denmark (Stjerne) 🔨	0	0	1	0	1	0	2	0	4	X	8
Germany (Kampf)	0	0	0	0	0	2	0	1	0	X	3

Sheet D	1	2	3	4	5	6	7	8	9	10	11	Final
Scotland (Black) 🔨	0	0	2	0	1	0	1	0	1	1	0	6
United States (Plys)	1	1	0	1	0	1	0	2	0	0	1	7

==== Draw 2 ====
Friday, March 6, 9:00

Sheet A	1	2	3	4	5	6	7	8	9	10	Final
China (Zang)	0	0	1	0	1	0	1	0	1	0	4
Switzerland (Bartschiger) 🔨	0	1	0	1	0	1	0	1	0	1	5

Sheet B	1	2	3	4	5	6	7	8	9	10	Final
Denmark (Stjerne) 🔨	0	2	1	1	0	0	2	0	1	X	7
United States (Plys)	0	0	0	0	2	0	0	1	0	X	3

Sheet C	1	2	3	4	5	6	7	8	9	10	Final
Canada (Gallant)	0	2	1	2	0	2	0	3	X	X	10
Sweden (Eriksson) 🔨	1	0	0	0	2	0	1	0	X	X	4

Sheet D	1	2	3	4	5	6	7	8	9	10	Final
Russia (Drozdov) 🔨	0	0	0	1	0	0	2	0	2	0	5
Norway (Rolvsjord)	0	2	1	0	1	0	0	2	0	1	7

==== Draw 3 ====
Friday, March 6, 19:00

Sheet A	1	2	3	4	5	6	7	8	9	10	Final
Scotland (Black)	0	3	0	0	1	0	0	1	0	2	7
Germany (Kampf) 🔨	1	0	1	1	0	1	0	0	1	0	5

Sheet B	1	2	3	4	5	6	7	8	9	10	11	Final
Switzerland (Bartschiger)	0	2	1	1	0	1	0	2	0	2	0	9
Canada (Gallant) 🔨	1	0	0	0	2	0	3	0	3	0	1	10

Sheet C	1	2	3	4	5	6	7	8	9	10	Final
Norway (Rolvsjord)	0	1	0	1	0	3	1	0	1	1	8
United States (Plys) 🔨	1	0	3	0	3	0	0	2	0	0	9

Sheet D	1	2	3	4	5	6	7	8	9	10	Final
Sweden (Eriksson)	0	3	0	0	1	0	1	0	0	2	7
China (Zang) 🔨	1	0	2	0	0	1	0	0	2	0	6

==== Draw 4 ====
Saturday, March 7, 14:00

Sheet A	1	2	3	4	5	6	7	8	9	10	Final
Russia (Drozdov)	0	0	1	0	2	0	0	2	0	X	5
Denmark (Stjerne) 🔨	0	1	0	3	0	2	0	0	1	X	7

Sheet B	1	2	3	4	5	6	7	8	9	10	Final
Scotland (Black)	0	0	0	2	0	0	1	0	X	X	3
China (Zang) 🔨	1	1	2	0	3	0	0	2	X	X	9

Sheet C	1	2	3	4	5	6	7	8	9	10	Final
Germany (Kampf)	0	2	1	0	0	2	0	0	1	0	6
Canada (Gallant) 🔨	2	0	0	2	1	0	0	2	0	1	8

Sheet D	1	2	3	4	5	6	7	8	9	10	Final
Norway (Rolvsjord) 🔨	0	1	0	0	2	0	0	1	0	1	5
Switzerland (Bartschiger)	0	0	1	1	0	1	0	0	1	0	4

==== Draw 5 ====
Sunday, March 8, 9:00

Sheet A	1	2	3	4	5	6	7	8	9	10	Final
Sweden (Eriksson)	1	1	1	0	1	0	1	0	0	1	6
United States (Plys) 🔨	0	0	0	0	0	1	0	2	2	0	5

Sheet B	1	2	3	4	5	6	7	8	9	10	Final
Germany (Kampf) 🔨	0	0	0	1	0	1	0	1	X	X	3
Switzerland (Bartschiger)	0	2	1	0	2	0	3	0	X	X	8

Sheet C	1	2	3	4	5	6	7	8	9	10	Final
Russia (Drozdov) 🔨	0	1	0	2	3	0	0	3	0	X	9
Scotland (Black)	1	0	1	0	0	0	2	0	1	X	5

Sheet D	1	2	3	4	5	6	7	8	9	10	Final
China (Zang)	0	2	1	0	0	2	1	0	1	X	7
Denmark (Stjerne) 🔨	1	0	0	2	0	0	0	1	0	X	4

==== Draw 6 ====
Sunday, March 8, 19:00

Sheet A	1	2	3	4	5	6	7	8	9	10	Final
Canada (Gallant) 🔨	3	0	0	1	0	2	2	1	0	X	9
Russia (Drozdov)	0	1	1	0	1	0	0	0	1	X	4

Sheet B	1	2	3	4	5	6	7	8	9	10	Final
Norway (Rolvsjord) 🔨	2	0	0	1	0	2	2	0	0	3	10
Sweden (Eriksson)	0	1	0	0	2	0	0	2	2	0	7

Sheet C	1	2	3	4	5	6	7	8	9	10	Final
Switzerland (Bartschiger)	1	0	0	0	1	0	1	1	1	1	6
Denmark (Stjerne) 🔨	0	1	1	1	0	4	0	0	0	0	7

Sheet D	1	2	3	4	5	6	7	8	9	10	Final
United States (Plys) 🔨	5	1	4	0	1	0	X	X	X	X	11
Germany (Kampf)	0	0	0	1	0	2	X	X	X	X	3

==== Draw 7 ====
Monday, March 9, 14:00

Sheet A	1	2	3	4	5	6	7	8	9	10	Final
Switzerland (Bartschiger) 🔨	0	1	1	0	1	0	2	0	1	0	6
Scotland (Black)	0	0	0	1	0	1	0	1	0	1	4

Sheet B	1	2	3	4	5	6	7	8	9	10	Final
Canada (Gallant)	0	0	1	1	0	3	1	0	0	1	7
Denmark (Stjerne) 🔨	2	0	0	0	1	0	0	0	2	0	5

Sheet C	1	2	3	4	5	6	7	8	9	10	Final
China (Zang) 🔨	0	0	0	1	0	3	0	1	1	0	6
Russia (Drozdov)	1	1	2	0	1	0	1	0	0	1	7

Sheet D	1	2	3	4	5	6	7	8	9	10	Final
Germany (Kampf)	0	0	1	0	0	0	2	0	0	X	3
Norway (Rolvsjord) 🔨	0	1	0	1	1	2	0	2	1	X	8

==== Draw 8 ====
Tuesday, March 10, 9:00

Sheet A	1	2	3	4	5	6	7	8	9	10	Final
Germany (Kampf) 🔨	0	2	0	1	2	0	0	1	X	X	6
Sweden (Eriksson)	2	0	6	0	0	0	3	0	X	X	11

Sheet B	1	2	3	4	5	6	7	8	9	10	Final
China (Zang) 🔨	1	1	0	1	0	1	0	2	2	X	8
Norway (Rolvsjord)	0	0	2	0	0	0	2	0	0	X	4

Sheet C	1	2	3	4	5	6	7	8	9	10	Final
United States (Plys)	0	1	0	0	2	1	0	1	0	0	5
Switzerland (Bartschiger) 🔨	1	0	1	0	0	0	1	0	0	1	4

Sheet D	1	2	3	4	5	6	7	8	9	10	Final
Canada (Gallant)	0	0	1	1	0	0	0	0	2	X	4
Scotland (Black) 🔨	1	0	0	0	0	0	3	2	0	X	6

==== Draw 9 ====
Tuesday, March 10, 19:00

Sheet A	1	2	3	4	5	6	7	8	9	10	Final
Canada (Gallant) 🔨	2	1	0	1	1	0	0	2	0	1	8
China (Zang)	0	0	2	0	0	1	2	0	1	0	6

Sheet B	1	2	3	4	5	6	7	8	9	10	Final
United States (Plys)	1	0	0	1	0	0	2	1	0	3	8
Russia (Drozdov) 🔨	0	2	1	0	0	1	0	0	1	0	5

Sheet C	1	2	3	4	5	6	7	8	9	10	Final
Scotland (Black) 🔨	0	0	2	0	0	2	0	3	0	1	8
Norway (Rolvsjord)	0	1	0	2	0	0	1	0	2	0	6

Sheet D	1	2	3	4	5	6	7	8	9	10	11	Final
Denmark (Stjerne)	0	1	0	0	0	1	0	1	0	2	3	8
Sweden (Eriksson) 🔨	1	0	0	1	0	0	2	0	1	0	0	5

==== Draw 10 ====
Wednesday, March 11, 14:00

Sheet B	1	2	3	4	5	6	7	8	9	10	Final
Sweden (Eriksson) 🔨	1	0	1	0	2	0	1	1	0	0	6
Scotland (Black)	0	2	0	1	0	0	0	0	1	1	5

Sheet C	1	2	3	4	5	6	7	8	9	10	Final
Germany (Kampf)	0	2	0	3	0	1	1	0	1	X	8
China (Zang) 🔨	1	0	1	0	0	0	0	2	0	X	4

Sheet D	1	2	3	4	5	6	7	8	9	10	Final
Switzerland (Bartschiger)	0	2	0	0	2	2	0	0	2	0	8
Russia (Drozdov) 🔨	0	0	3	1	0	0	0	2	0	1	7

==== Draw 11 ====
Thursday, March 12, 8:30

Sheet A	1	2	3	4	5	6	7	8	9	10	Final
Denmark (Stjerne) 🔨	2	1	1	0	0	0	3	1	1	X	9
Norway (Rolvsjord)	0	0	0	2	2	2	0	0	0	X	6

Sheet D	1	2	3	4	5	6	7	8	9	10	Final
United States (Plys) 🔨	0	1	0	1	0	0	1	0	X	X	3
Canada (Gallant)	1	0	2	0	3	1	0	2	X	X	9

==== Draw 12 ====
Thursday, March 12, 19:00

Sheet A	1	2	3	4	5	6	7	8	9	10	Final
United States (Plys) 🔨	1	1	0	2	0	3	0	0	3	X	10
China (Zang)	0	0	1	0	1	0	2	1	0	X	5

Sheet B	1	2	3	4	5	6	7	8	9	10	Final
Russia (Drozdov) 🔨	0	1	1	0	0	3	1	2	X	X	8
Germany (Kampf)	0	0	0	1	0	0	0	0	X	X	1

Sheet C	1	2	3	4	5	6	7	8	9	10	Final
Sweden (Eriksson) 🔨	1	0	0	1	0	1	2	0	2	X	7
Switzerland (Bartschiger)	0	1	0	0	1	0	0	2	0	X	4

Sheet D	1	2	3	4	5	6	7	8	9	10	Final
Scotland (Black)	0	0	0	1	0	0	0	X	X	X	1
Denmark (Stjerne) 🔨	0	1	2	0	2	3	1	X	X	X	9

=== Playoffs ===
Page playoff system
1	Canada	11
2	Denmark	5
3	Sweden	5
4	United States	7

Semifinal
2	Denmark	9
4	United States	4

Gold-medal game
1	Canada	6
2	Denmark	9

Bronze-medal game
3	Sweden	4
4	United States	9

==== 1 vs. 2 Game ====
Friday, March 13, 14:00

Sheet C	1	2	3	4	5	6	7	8	9	10	Final
Canada (Gallant) 🔨	1	0	1	0	2	6	0	1	X	X	11
Denmark (Stjerne)	0	2	0	1	0	0	2	0	X	X	5

==== 3 vs. 4 Game ====
Friday, March 13, 14:00

Sheet D	1	2	3	4	5	6	7	8	9	10	Final
United States (Plys)	0	1	1	0	2	0	0	1	0	2	7
Sweden (Eriksson) 🔨	2	0	0	1	0	0	0	0	2	0	5

==== Semifinals ====
Saturday, March 14, 19:00

Sheet A	1	2	3	4	5	6	7	8	9	10	Final
United States (Plys)	0	2	0	0	1	0	1	0	X	X	4
Denmark (Stjerne) 🔨	2	0	2	1	0	1	0	3	X	X	9

==== Bronze-medal game ====
Sunday, March 15, 13:00

Sheet A	1	2	3	4	5	6	7	8	9	10	Final
Sweden (Eriksson)	0	0	0	0	2	0	0	2	X	X	4
United States (Plys) 🔨	2	3	0	2	0	2	0	0	X	X	9

==== Gold-medal game ====
Sunday, March 15, 13:00

Sheet C	1	2	3	4	5	6	7	8	9	10	Final
Denmark (Stjerne)	0	0	2	1	1	0	2	3	0	X	9
Canada (Gallant) 🔨	2	0	0	0	0	2	0	0	2	X	6

== Women ==
=== Teams ===
Country	Skip	Vice	Second	Lead	Alternate
Canada	Kaitlyn Lawes	Jenna Loder	Laryssa Grenkow	Breanne Meakin	Kalynn Park
Czech Republic	Anna Kubešková	Linda Klímová	Tereza Plíšková	Eliška Jalovcová	Martina Strnadová
Denmark	Mette de Neergaard	Marie de Neergaard	Natascha Hinze Glenstrøm	Charlotte Thure Clemmesen	Christine Svensen
France	Marie Coulot	Solène Coulot	Anna Li	Manon Humbert	Anne-Claire Beaubestre
Japan	Satsuki Fujisawa	Shiori Fujisawa	Yui Okabe	Madoka Shinoo	Kai Tsuchiya
Russia	Margarita Fomina	Ekaterina Galkina	Anna Sidorova	Daria Kozlova	Galina Arsenkina
Scotland	Eve Muirhead	Anna Sloan	Vicki Adams	Sarah MacIntyre	Kay Adams
Sweden	Anna Hasselborg	Agnes Knochenhauer	Sofie Sidén	Zandra Flyg	Sara McManus
Switzerland	Marisa Winkelhausen (fourth)	Martina Baumann (skip)	Franziska Kaufmann	Isobel Kurt	Nicole Dunki
United States	Alexandra Carlson	Tabitha Peterson	Tara Peterson	Sophie Brorson	Molly Bonner

=== Round-robin standings ===
Final round-robin standings

Key
Teams to Playoffs

Country	Skip	W	L
Switzerland	Martina Baumann	7	2
Scotland	Eve Muirhead	7	2
Canada	Kaitlyn Lawes	6	3
Russia	Margarita Fomina	6	3
United States	Alexandra Carlson	4	5
Sweden	Anna Hasselborg	4	5
Czech Republic	Anna Kubešková	3	6
Denmark	Mette de Neergaard	3	6
France	Marie Coulot	3	6
Japan	Satsuki Fujisawa	2	7

=== Round-robin results ===
==== Draw 1 ====
Thursday, March 5, 9:00

Sheet A	1	2	3	4	5	6	7	8	9	10	Final
France (Coulot)	0	0	0	0	1	0	1	0	X	X	2
Scotland (Muirhead) 🔨	0	2	1	1	0	4	0	3	X	X	11

Sheet B	1	2	3	4	5	6	7	8	9	10	Final
Canada (Lawes)	1	3	0	4	0	2	X	X	X	X	10
Denmark (de Neergaard) 🔨	0	0	1	0	1	0	X	X	X	X	2

Sheet C	1	2	3	4	5	6	7	8	9	10	Final
Japan (Fujisawa) 🔨	0	2	2	0	2	0	2	0	0	0	8
United States (Carlson)	1	0	0	2	0	4	0	0	1	1	9

Sheet D	1	2	3	4	5	6	7	8	9	10	Final
Switzerland (Baumann) 🔨	1	2	0	3	2	0	2	X	X	X	10
Czech Republic (Kubešková)	0	0	1	0	0	1	0	X	X	X	2

==== Draw 2 ====
Thursday, March 5, 19:30

Sheet A	1	2	3	4	5	6	7	8	9	10	Final
Russia (Fomina)	0	0	2	0	0	2	1	2	X	X	7
Sweden (Hasselborg) 🔨	0	1	0	0	1	0	0	0	X	X	2

Sheet B	1	2	3	4	5	6	7	8	9	10	Final
Japan (Fujisawa)	0	1	0	1	0	0	1	1	0	X	4
Czech Republic (Kubešková) 🔨	2	0	2	0	0	3	0	0	1	X	8

Sheet C	1	2	3	4	5	6	7	8	9	10	Final
Scotland (Muirhead) 🔨	0	1	0	0	1	0	1	0	0	X	3
Canada (Lawes)	0	0	1	0	0	2	0	4	1	X	8

Sheet D	1	2	3	4	5	6	7	8	9	10	Final
Denmark (de Neergaard)	0	2	1	0	1	0	2	2	0	0	8
France (Coulot) 🔨	1	0	0	2	0	1	0	0	2	1	7

==== Draw 3 ====
Friday, March 6, 14:00

Sheet A	1	2	3	4	5	6	7	8	9	10	Final
Switzerland (Baumann) 🔨	3	1	0	2	0	0	1	1	2	X	10
United States (Carlson)	0	0	2	0	3	2	0	0	0	X	7

Sheet B	1	2	3	4	5	6	7	8	9	10	Final
Sweden (Hasselborg)	0	0	0	0	1	0	0	0	X	X	1
Scotland (Muirhead) 🔨	2	0	0	1	0	0	2	2	X	X	7

Sheet C	1	2	3	4	5	6	7	8	9	10	Final
France (Coulot) 🔨	1	0	3	0	2	3	0	0	1	X	10
Czech Republic (Kubešková)	0	3	0	1	0	0	1	1	0	X	6

Sheet D	1	2	3	4	5	6	7	8	9	10	Final
Canada (Lawes) 🔨	1	0	1	1	1	0	0	2	0	X	6
Russia (Fomina)	0	1	0	0	0	2	0	0	1	X	4

==== Draw 4 ====
Saturday, March 7, 9:00

Sheet A	1	2	3	4	5	6	7	8	9	10	Final
Denmark (de Neergaard)	0	1	1	0	1	0	0	2	0	1	6
Japan (Fujisawa) 🔨	0	0	0	2	0	1	1	0	1	0	5

Sheet B	1	2	3	4	5	6	7	8	9	10	Final
Switzerland (Baumann)	0	1	0	1	0	2	0	0	1	0	5
Russia (Fomina) 🔨	1	0	2	0	2	0	0	1	0	1	7

Sheet C	1	2	3	4	5	6	7	8	9	10	Final
United States (Carlson) 🔨	0	4	0	0	0	2	0	3	0	0	9
Scotland (Muirhead)	0	0	1	1	2	0	1	0	3	3	11

Sheet D	1	2	3	4	5	6	7	8	9	10	Final
France (Coulot)	0	2	0	1	0	0	1	0	0	X	4
Sweden (Hasselborg) 🔨	0	0	1	0	5	1	0	2	1	X	10

==== Draw 5 ====
Saturday, March 7, 19:00

Sheet A	1	2	3	4	5	6	7	8	9	10	Final
Canada (Lawes)	0	1	1	0	2	3	0	1	2	X	10
Czech Republic (Kubešková) 🔨	2	0	0	3	0	0	1	0	0	X	6

Sheet B	1	2	3	4	5	6	7	8	9	10	Final
United States (Carlson)	1	3	2	0	0	0	2	0	2	X	10
Sweden (Hasselborg) 🔨	0	0	0	2	2	1	0	1	0	X	6

Sheet C	1	2	3	4	5	6	7	8	9	10	Final
Denmark (de Neergaard)	0	3	1	0	2	0	0	0	0	X	6
Switzerland (Baumann) 🔨	2	0	0	2	0	2	3	0	1	X	10

Sheet D	1	2	3	4	5	6	7	8	9	10	Final
Russia (Fomina) 🔨	0	3	0	0	0	0	3	2	0	2	10
Japan (Fujisawa)	0	0	2	1	1	2	0	0	1	0	7

==== Draw 6 ====
Sunday, March 8, 19:00

Sheet A	1	2	3	4	5	6	7	8	9	10	Final
Scotland (Muirhead) 🔨	0	0	2	0	1	1	2	0	1	1	8
Denmark (de Neergaard)	1	2	0	3	0	0	0	1	0	0	7

Sheet B	1	2	3	4	5	6	7	8	9	10	Final
France (Coulot) 🔨	0	1	0	3	0	1	0	1	1	X	7
Canada (Lawes)	1	0	1	0	1	0	1	0	0	X	4

Sheet C	1	2	3	4	5	6	7	8	9	10	Final
Sweden (Hasselborg)	0	0	0	0	1	0	2	1	0	X	4
Japan (Fujisawa) 🔨	1	1	1	2	0	2	0	0	2	X	9

Sheet D	1	2	3	4	5	6	7	8	9	10	Final
Czech Republic (Kubešková)	0	2	0	1	2	0	0	0	0	X	5
United States (Carlson) 🔨	1	0	2	0	0	2	3	2	3	X	13

==== Draw 7 ====
Monday, March 9, 9:00

Sheet A	1	2	3	4	5	6	7	8	9	10	Final
Sweden (Hasselborg)	0	2	0	0	2	0	0	3	0	0	7
Switzerland (Baumann) 🔨	1	0	2	1	0	1	0	0	2	1	8

Sheet B	1	2	3	4	5	6	7	8	9	10	Final
Scotland (Muirhead)	0	1	0	3	0	2	0	2	0	1	9
Japan (Fujisawa) 🔨	1	0	1	0	2	0	2	0	2	0	8

Sheet C	1	2	3	4	5	6	7	8	9	10	Final
Russia (Fomina) 🔨	2	4	1	0	2	1	X	X	X	X	10
Denmark (de Neergaard)	0	0	0	1	0	0	X	X	X	X	1

Sheet D	1	2	3	4	5	6	7	8	9	10	Final
United States (Carlson) 🔨	1	1	0	3	0	0	0	0	1	0	6
France (Coulot)	0	0	2	0	2	2	0	1	0	0	7

==== Draw 8 ====
Monday, March 9, 19:00

Sheet A	1	2	3	4	5	6	7	8	9	10	Final
United States (Carlson)	0	1	0	1	1	1	0	4	2	X	10
Canada (Lawes) 🔨	0	0	2	0	0	0	1	0	0	X	3

Sheet B	1	2	3	4	5	6	7	8	9	10	Final
Russia (Fomina) 🔨	1	3	0	3	0	4	X	X	X	X	11
France (Coulot)	0	0	2	0	1	0	X	X	X	X	3

Sheet C	1	2	3	4	5	6	7	8	9	10	Final
Czech Republic (Kubešková)	0	1	1	0	2	0	1	0	0	X	5
Sweden (Hasselborg) 🔨	1	0	0	1	0	2	0	2	1	X	7

Sheet D	1	2	3	4	5	6	7	8	9	10	Final
Scotland (Muirhead) 🔨	1	0	1	0	0	0	2	1	0	0	5
Switzerland (Baumann)	0	1	0	2	0	2	0	0	1	2	8

==== Draw 9 ====
Tuesday, March 10, 14:00

Sheet A	1	2	3	4	5	6	7	8	9	10	11	Final
Scotland (Muirhead)	0	2	0	0	2	0	0	2	0	2	1	9
Russia (Fomina) 🔨	2	0	2	1	0	1	1	0	1	0	0	8

Sheet B	1	2	3	4	5	6	7	8	9	10	Final
Czech Republic (Kubešková)	0	1	0	2	2	0	1	0	2	X	8
Denmark (de Neergaard) 🔨	1	0	1	0	0	1	0	1	0	X	4

Sheet C	1	2	3	4	5	6	7	8	9	10	Final
Switzerland (Baumann) 🔨	0	3	0	0	1	0	0	0	3	X	7
France (Coulot)	0	0	1	3	0	0	1	0	0	X	5

Sheet D	1	2	3	4	5	6	7	8	9	10	Final
Japan (Fujisawa)	0	0	1	0	2	0	1	0	X	X	4
Canada (Lawes) 🔨	0	4	0	3	0	4	0	2	X	X	13

==== Draw 10 ====
Wednesday, March 11, 9:00

Sheet B	1	2	3	4	5	6	7	8	9	10	Final
Canada (Lawes) 🔨	0	1	0	0	3	2	0	2	X	X	8
Switzerland (Baumann)	0	0	0	1	0	0	1	0	X	X	2

Sheet C	1	2	3	4	5	6	7	8	9	10	Final
United States (Carlson)	0	0	1	0	1	0	1	0	X	X	3
Russia (Fomina) 🔨	2	0	0	3	0	2	0	2	X	X	9

Sheet D	1	2	3	4	5	6	7	8	9	10	Final
Sweden (Hasselborg)	0	0	0	2	1	1	0	2	0	X	6
Denmark (de Neergaard) 🔨	1	0	0	0	0	0	1	0	0	X	2

==== Draw 11 ====
Wednesday, March 11, 19:00

Sheet A	1	2	3	4	5	6	7	8	9	10	Final
Japan (Fujisawa)	1	0	0	2	1	1	0	2	0	1	8
France (Coulot) 🔨	0	0	3	0	0	0	1	0	2	0	6

Sheet D	1	2	3	4	5	6	7	8	9	10	Final
Czech Republic (Kubešková)	1	0	0	2	0	1	0	0	0	X	4
Scotland (Muirhead) 🔨	0	2	1	0	2	0	0	0	3	X	8

==== Draw 12 ====
Thursday, March 12, 13:00

Sheet A	1	2	3	4	5	6	7	8	9	10	Final
Czech Republic (Kubešková)	0	1	0	2	0	1	1	0	1	3	9
Russia (Fomina) 🔨	0	0	1	0	3	0	0	2	0	0	6

Sheet B	1	2	3	4	5	6	7	8	9	10	Final
Denmark (de Neergaard)	2	1	2	0	1	0	1	0	1	X	8
United States (Carlson) 🔨	0	0	0	2	0	2	0	1	0	X	5

Sheet C	1	2	3	4	5	6	7	8	9	10	Final
Canada (Lawes)	0	0	1	0	1	0	2	0	0	X	4
Sweden (Hasselborg) 🔨	1	0	0	2	0	3	0	0	1	X	7

Sheet D	1	2	3	4	5	6	7	8	9	10	Final
Switzerland (Baumann)	0	0	1	1	0	2	0	2	0	1	7
Japan (Fujisawa) 🔨	0	1	0	0	2	0	1	0	1	0	5

=== Tiebreakers ===
Friday, March 13, 9:00

Sheet C	1	2	3	4	5	6	7	8	9	10	Final
Czech Republic (Kubešková) 🔨	2	0	2	0	2	2	X	X	X	X	8
Denmark (de Neergaard)	0	1	0	1	0	0	X	X	X	X	2

Friday, March 13, 14:00

Sheet D	1	2	3	4	5	6	7	8	9	10	Final
France (Coulot)	1	0	0	2	0	1	0	0	1	0	5
Denmark (de Neergaard) 🔨	0	1	0	0	0	0	1	1	0	1	4

=== Playoffs ===
Page playoff system
1	Switzerland	4
2	Scotland	7
3	Canada	4
4	Russia	3

Semifinal
1	Switzerland	3
3	Canada	9

Gold-medal game
2	Scotland	8
3	Canada	6

Bronze-medal game
1	Switzerland	5
4	Russia	4

==== 1 vs. 2 Game ====
Friday, March 13, 19:00

Sheet B	1	2	3	4	5	6	7	8	9	10	Final
Scotland (Muirhead)	0	0	3	0	1	0	0	0	3	X	7
Switzerland (Baumann) 🔨	0	0	0	1	0	2	1	0	0	X	4

==== 3 vs. 4 Game ====
Friday, March 13, 19:00

Sheet D	1	2	3	4	5	6	7	8	9	10	Final
Canada (Lawes) 🔨	0	0	1	1	0	1	0	0	0	1	4
Russia (Fomina)	0	0	0	0	1	0	1	0	1	0	3

==== Semifinal ====
Saturday, March 14, 19:00

Sheet C	1	2	3	4	5	6	7	8	9	10	Final
Switzerland (Baumann) 🔨	0	1	0	0	0	1	0	1	X	X	3
Canada (Lawes)	2	0	0	3	1	0	3	0	X	X	9

==== Bronze-medal game ====
Sunday, March 15, 13:00

Sheet A	1	2	3	4	5	6	7	8	9	10	Final
Russia (Fomina)	0	1	0	0	2	0	0	1	0	0	4
Switzerland (Baumann) 🔨	1	0	0	1	0	0	1	0	0	2	5

==== Gold-medal game ====
Sunday, March 15, 13:00

Sheet B	1	2	3	4	5	6	7	8	9	10	Final
Scotland (Muirhead) 🔨	2	0	0	0	2	0	2	0	1	1	8
Canada (Lawes)	0	0	2	1	0	1	0	2	0	0	6
