= Chen Lu'an (curler) =

Chinese curler

- Curler ♂
- Born: January 10, 1988 (age 38)

Team
- Curling club: Harbin CC, Harbin

Curling career
- Member Association: China
- World Championship: 3 (2009, 2011, 2012)
- Pacific-Asia Championship: 3 (2008, 2010, 2011)
- Other appearances: World Junior Championships: 2 (2008, 2009), Pacific-Asia Junior Championships: 2 (2008, 2009), Winter Universiade: 2 (2007, 2009)
Medal record
Curling
Pacific-Asia Championships
Gold medal – first place	2008 Naseby
Gold medal – first place	2010 Uieseong
Gold medal – first place	2011 Nanjing
Pacific-Asia Junior Championships
Gold medal – first place	2008 Jeonju City
Gold medal – first place	2009 Harbin
Winter Universiade
Bronze medal – third place	2009 Harbin

Chen Lu'an (Chinese: 陈路安; pinyin: Chén Lù'ān; born January 10, 1988) is a Chinese male curler.

At the international level, he is a three-time Pacific-Asia champion (2008, 2010, 2011).

== Teams ==
Season	Skip	Third	Second	Lead	Alternate	Coach	Events
2006–07	Zou Dejia	Wang Zi	Zhang Zhipeng	Yang Tuo	Chen Lu'an	Li Hongchen	WUG 2007 (5th)
2007–08	Zang Jialiang	Wang Zi	Yang Tuo	Chen Lu'an	Ji Yansong	Li Hongchen	PAJCC 2008 (gold); WJCC 2008 (8th)
2008–09	Zang Jialiang	Ji Yansong	Chen Lu'an	Li Guangxu	Huang Ji Hui	Li Hongchen	PAJCC 2009 (gold); WJCC 2009 (8th)
2008–09	Wang Fengchun	Liu Rui	Xu Xiaoming	Zang Jialiang	Chen Lu'an	Daniel Rafael (PACC, WUG, WCC), Zhang Wei (PACC, WUG)	PACC 2008 (gold); WUG 2009 (bronze); WCC 2009 (9th)
2010–11	Ji Yansong	Chen Lu'an	Li Guangxu	Liang Shuming			
2010–11	Wang Fengchun	Zang Jialiang	Xu Xiaoming	Ba Dexin	Chen Lu'an	Zhang Wei	PACC 2010 (gold)
2010–11	Chen Lu'an	Li Guangxu	Ji Yansong	Guo Wenli	Ba Dexin	Li Hongchen	WCC 2011 (9th)
2011–12	Liu Rui	Xu Xiaoming	Ba Dexin	Chen Lu'an	Zang Jialiang	Lorne Hamblin	PACC 2011 (gold)
2011–12	Liu Rui	Xu Xiaoming	Ba Dexin	Zang Jialiang	Chen Lu'an	Li Hongchen	PACC 2011 (gold); WCC 2012 (6th)
2012–13	Zou Dejia	Chen Lu'an	Ji Yansong	Li Guangxu			
