= Guo Wenli =

Chinese male curler

- Curler ♂
- Born: March 2, 1989 (age 37)

Team
- Curling club: Harbin CC, Harbin, Heilongjiang CC, Harbin

Curling career
- Member Association: China
- World Championship: 1 (2011)
- World Mixed Doubles Championship: 1 (2014)
- Other appearances: World Mixed Championship: 1 (2015), World Junior Championships: 1 (2010), Pacific-Asia Junior Championships: 1 (2010)
Medal record
Curling
World Mixed Championship
Bronze medal – third place	2015 Bern
Pacific-Asia Junior Championships
Gold medal – first place	2010 Nayoro

Guo Wenli (born March 2, 1989) is a Chinese male curler.

At the international level, he is a 2015 World Mixed bronze medallist and a 2010 Pacific junior champion curler.

== Teams ==
=== Men's ===
Season	Skip	Third	Second	Lead	Alternate	Coach	Events
2009–10	Ji Yansong	Huang Jihui	Ba Dexin	Guo Wenli	Han Yujun	Ma Yongjun (WJCC)	PAJCC 2010 (gold); WJCC 2010 (4th)
2010–11	Chen Lu'an	Li Guangxu	Ji Yansong	Guo Wenli	Ba Dexin	Li Hongchen	WCC 2011 (9th)

=== Mixed ===
Season	Skip	Third	Second	Lead	Coach	Events
2015–16	Ji Yansong	Zheng Chunmei	Guo Wenli	Gao Xuesong	Wang Fengchun	WMxCC 2015 (bronze)

=== Mixed doubles ===
Season	Male	Female	Coach	Events
2013–14	Guo Wenli	Liu Sijia	Wang Fengchun	WMDCC 2014 (11th)
