= 2011 DEKALB Superspiel =

2011 DEKALB Superspiel may refer to one of the following:

- 2011 DEKALB Superspiel (March), the bonspiel held in March 2011 as part of the 2010–11 curling season
- 2011 DEKALB Superspiel (November), the bonspiel held in November 2011 as part of the 2011–12 curling season
