= Li Guangxu (curler) =

Chinese male curler and coach

- Curler ♂
- Born: April 24, 1988 (age 38)

Team
- Curling club: Harbin CC, Harbin, Heilongjiang CC, Harbin

Curling career
- Member Association: China
- World Championship: 1 (2011)
- World Mixed Doubles Championship: 1 (2008)
- Other appearances: World Junior Championships: 1 (2009), Pacific-Asia Junior Championships: 1 (2009)
Medal record
Curling
Pacific-Asia Junior Championships
Gold medal – first place	2009 Harbin

Li Guangxu (Chinese: 李广旭; pinyin: Lǐ Guǎngxù; born April 24, 1988) is a Chinese male curler and curling coach.

At the international level, he is a 2009 Pacific junior champion curler.

== Teams ==
=== Men's ===
Season	Skip	Third	Second	Lead	Alternate	Coach	Events
2008–09	Zang Jialiang	Ji Yansong	Chen Lu'an	Li Guangxu	Huang Ji Hui	Li Hongchen	PAJCC 2009 (gold); WJCC 2009 (8th)
2010–11	Ji Yansong	Chen Lu'an	Li Guangxu	Liang Shuming			
2010–11	Chen Lu'an	Li Guangxu	Ji Yansong	Guo Wenli	Ba Dexin	Li Hongchen	WCC 2011 (9th)
2012–13	Zou Dejia	Chen Lu'an	Ji Yansong	Li Guangxu			
2014–15	Zhang Ze Zhong	Feng Shuo	Li Haoran	Li Guangxu	Zhang Zhongbao		

=== Mixed doubles ===
Season	Male	Female	Coach	Events
2007–08	Li Guangxu	Zhang Xindi	Zhao Zhenzhen	WMDCC 2008 (10th)
2019–20	Li Guangxu	Zhang Di		

== Record as a coach of national teams ==
Year	Tournament, event	National team	Place
2018	2018 World Junior B Curling Championships	China (junior women)	1st place, gold medalist(s)
2018	2018 World Junior Curling Championships	China (junior men)	8
