= Li Dongyan =

Chinese male curler

- Curler ♂

Team
- Curling club: Harbin CC, Harbin, Heilongjiang CC, Harbin

Curling career
- Member Association: China
- World Championship: 1 (2008)
Medal record
Curling

Li Dongyan is a former Chinese male curler.

As of 2010, he was employed for Chinese Curling Association as General Secretary.

As of October 2019, he is a special adviser to the World Curling Federation Board.

== Teams ==
Season	Skip	Third	Second	Lead	Alternate	Coach	Events
2007–08	Wang Fengchun	Liu Rui	Xu Xiaoming	Zang Jialang	Li Dongyan	Daniel Rafael	WCC 2008 (4th)
