= 2010 World Junior Curling Championships =

- Host city: Flims, Switzerland
- Arena: Waldhaus Arena
- Dates: March 5–14
- Men's winner: Switzerland
- Skip: Peter de Cruz
- Fourth: Benoît Schwarz
- Third: Roger Gulka
- Lead: Valentin Tanner
- Alternate: Dominik Märki
- Finalist: Scotland (Ally Fraser)
- Women's winner: Sweden
- Skip: Anna Hasselborg
- Third: Jonna McManus
- Second: Agnes Knochenhauer
- Lead: Sara McManus
- Alternate: Anna Huhta
- Finalist: Canada (Rachel Homan)

The 2010 World Junior Curling Championships were held from March 5 to 14 at the Waldhaus Arena in Flims, Switzerland.

== Men ==
=== Teams ===
Country	Skip	Third	Second	Lead	Alternate
Canada	Jake Walker	Craig Van Ymeren	Geoff Chambers	Matthew Mapletoft	Mathew Camm
China	Ji Yansong	Huang Jihui	Ba Dexin	Guo Wenli	Han Yujun
Denmark	Mikkel Krause	Oliver Dupont	Tobias Thune	Troels Harry	Kasper Jørgensen
Finland	Kasper Hakunti	Iiro Sipola (skip)	Oskari Ainol	Kalle Wallin	Toni Ylhäinen
Norway	Markus Snove Hoiberg	Steffen Mellemseter (skip)	Steffen Walstad	Magnus Nedregotten	Truls Rolvsjord
Russia	Alexey Stukalskiy	Artem Bolduzev (skip)	Viktor Kornev	Vadim Raev	Evgeny Arkhipov
Scotland	Ally Fraser	Steven Mitchell	Scott Andrews	Kerr Drummond	Blair Fraser
Sweden	Patric Mabergs	Gustav Eskilsson	Jesper Johansson	Victor Herlin	Johannes Patz
Switzerland	Benoit Schwarz	Roger Gulka	Peter de Cruz (skip)	Valentin Tanner	Dominik Märki
United States	Sean Beighton	Derrick McLean	Sam Galey	Joe Purvis	Aaron Tasa

=== Round-robin standings ===
Final round-robin standings

Key
Teams to Playoffs
Teams to Tiebreakers

Country	Skip	W	L
Scotland	Ally Fraser	8	1
China	Ji Yansong	7	2
Switzerland	Peter de Cruz	7	2
Canada	Jake Walker	6	3
Norway	Steffen Mellemseter	6	3
Sweden	Patric Mabergs	4	5
Finland	Kasper Hakunti	3	6
Denmark	Mikkel Krause	2	7
United States	Sean Beighton	1	8
Russia	Artem Bolduzev	1	8

=== Round-robin results ===
==== Draw 1 ====
Saturday, March 6, 14:00

Sheet A	1	2	3	4	5	6	7	8	9	10	Final
Russia (Bolduzev)	1	0	1	0	1	0	2	0	2	0	7
Sweden (Mabergs)	0	3	0	1	0	1	0	3	0	1	9

Sheet B	1	2	3	4	5	6	7	8	9	10	Final
China (Ji)	0	0	0	0	0	1	1	0	0	3	5
United States (Beighton)	0	0	0	0	1	0	0	0	2	0	3

Sheet C	1	2	3	4	5	6	7	8	9	10	Final
Denmark (Krause)	0	0	0	2	0	0	2	0	3	0	7
Switzerland (de Cruz)	0	0	1	0	2	1	0	2	0	2	8

Sheet D	1	2	3	4	5	6	7	8	9	10	Final
Scotland (Fraser)	0	0	0	1	0	0	2	0	0	X	3
Norway (Mellemseter)	1	0	4	0	0	1	0	2	1	X	9

Sheet E	1	2	3	4	5	6	7	8	9	10	Final
Canada (Walker)	0	0	0	1	1	0	1	0	3	X	6
Finland (Hakunti)	0	0	1	0	0	0	0	1	0	X	2

==== Draw 2 ====
Sunday, March 7, 9:00

Sheet A	1	2	3	4	5	6	7	8	9	10	Final
Canada (Walker)	0	1	0	0	2	0	0	1	0	X	4
China (Ji)	0	0	2	0	0	2	1	0	1	X	6

Sheet B	1	2	3	4	5	6	7	8	9	10	Final
Switzerland (de Cruz)	4	0	2	0	3	0	X	X	X	X	9
Finland (Hakunti)	0	1	0	2	0	1	X	X	X	X	4

Sheet C	1	2	3	4	5	6	7	8	9	10	Final
Russia (Bolduzev)	0	1	0	0	2	0	1	0	1	0	5
Scotland (Fraser)	0	0	1	1	0	2	0	1	0	1	6

Sheet D	1	2	3	4	5	6	7	8	9	10	Final
Denmark (Krause)	0	0	1	0	1	0	0	1	0	X	3
Sweden (Mabergs)	1	0	0	2	0	4	0	0	1	X	8

Sheet E	1	2	3	4	5	6	7	8	9	10	Final
United States (Beighton)	0	1	0	2	0	0	2	0	0	X	5
Norway (Mellemseter)	1	0	1	0	1	1	0	2	1	X	7

==== Draw 3 ====
Sunday, March 7, 19:00

Sheet A	1	2	3	4	5	6	7	8	9	10	Final
Norway (Mellemseter)	2	2	0	3	0	0	2	0	0	1	10
Finland (Hakunti)	0	0	4	0	2	1	0	1	0	0	8

Sheet B	1	2	3	4	5	6	7	8	9	10	Final
Sweden (Mabergs)	0	0	0	0	0	0	1	0	X	X	1
Scotland (Fraser)	0	0	0	1	0	0	0	5	X	X	6

Sheet C	1	2	3	4	5	6	7	8	9	10	Final
United States (Beighton)	0	1	0	0	2	0	0	0	0	0	3
Canada (Walker)	0	0	2	0	0	1	0	0	1	1	5

Sheet D	1	2	3	4	5	6	7	8	9	10	Final
Switzerland (de Cruz)	0	2	1	4	0	1	1	X	X	X	9
Russia (Bolduzev)	0	0	0	0	1	0	0	X	X	X	1

Sheet E	1	2	3	4	5	6	7	8	9	10	Final
Denmark (Krause)	0	3	1	0	1	0	0	1	0	X	6
China (Ji)	2	0	0	2	0	2	1	0	0	X	7

==== Draw 4 ====
Monday, March 8, 14:00

Sheet A	1	2	3	4	5	6	7	8	9	10	Final
Sweden (Mabergs)	2	0	2	4	0	5	X	X	X	X	13
United States (Beighton)	0	1	0	0	1	0	X	X	X	X	2

Sheet B	1	2	3	4	5	6	7	8	9	10	11	Final
Denmark (Krause)	2	0	2	0	0	1	0	2	0	0	2	9
Russia (Bolduzev)	0	1	0	1	2	0	1	0	1	1	0	7

Sheet C	1	2	3	4	5	6	7	8	9	10	Final
China (Ji)	0	0	0	1	0	0	0	1	X	X	2
Finland (Hakunti)	2	1	1	0	0	1	1	0	X	X	6

Sheet D	1	2	3	4	5	6	7	8	9	10	Final
Norway (Mellemseter)	1	0	0	1	0	3	0	0	X	X	5
Canada (Walker)	0	2	1	0	1	0	4	1	X	X	9

Sheet E	1	2	3	4	5	6	7	8	9	10	Final
Scotland (Fraser)	0	0	1	1	0	0	1	0	2	X	5
Switzerland (de Cruz)	1	0	0	0	1	0	0	1	0	X	3

==== Draw 5 ====
Tuesday, March 9, 9:00

Sheet A	1	2	3	4	5	6	7	8	9	10	Final
Denmark (Krause)	0	2	2	0	0	0	2	0	X	X	6
Canada (Walker)	3	0	0	4	2	0	0	2	X	X	11

Sheet B	1	2	3	4	5	6	7	8	9	10	Final
United States (Beighton)	0	0	0	0	2	1	0	0	2	0	5
Switzerland (de Cruz)	0	1	0	2	0	0	1	1	0	2	7

Sheet C	1	2	3	4	5	6	7	8	9	10	Final
Sweden (Mabergs)	1	0	0	0	0	0	0	3	1	0	5
Norway (Mellemseter)	0	0	0	4	0	0	0	0	0	2	6

Sheet D	1	2	3	4	5	6	7	8	9	10	Final
China (Ji)	0	0	0	0	1	0	1	1	0	X	3
Scotland (Fraser)	0	0	1	1	0	3	0	0	1	X	6

Sheet E	1	2	3	4	5	6	7	8	9	10	11	Final
Finland (Hakunti)	0	0	0	3	0	1	0	1	0	1	0	6
Russia (Bolduzev)	0	1	0	0	2	0	2	0	1	0	1	7

==== Draw 6 ====
Tuesday, March 9, 18:00

Sheet A	1	2	3	4	5	6	7	8	9	10	Final
Finland (Hakunti)	0	1	0	0	0	1	0	2	0	0	4
Scotland (Fraser)	1	0	1	0	0	0	2	0	0	1	5

Sheet B	1	2	3	4	5	6	7	8	9	10	Final
Russia (Bolduzev)	0	0	0	1	1	0	1	0	1	0	4
Norway (Mellemseter)	1	0	0	0	0	0	0	1	0	4	6

Sheet C	1	2	3	4	5	6	7	8	9	10	Final
Switzerland (de Cruz)	0	0	1	0	1	0	1	2	0	0	5
China (Ji)	1	0	0	0	0	3	0	0	1	1	6

Sheet D	1	2	3	4	5	6	7	8	9	10	Final
United States (Beighton)	0	0	0	1	0	1	0	2	X	X	4
Denmark (Krause)	2	1	4	0	2	0	1	0	X	X	10

Sheet E	1	2	3	4	5	6	7	8	9	10	Final
Sweden (Mabergs)	1	0	0	1	0	1	0	1	0	1	5
Canada (Walker)	0	0	2	0	1	0	1	0	2	0	6

==== Draw 7 ====
Wednesday, March 10, 14:00

Sheet A	1	2	3	4	5	6	7	8	9	10	Final
China (Ji)	0	0	0	1	1	0	0	0	1	1	4
Russia (Bolduzev)	0	0	1	0	0	0	0	1	0	0	2

Sheet B	1	2	3	4	5	6	7	8	9	10	11	Final
Finland (Hakunti)	0	2	0	0	0	2	0	0	1	1	0	6
Sweden (Mabergs)	2	0	0	0	1	0	2	1	0	0	1	7

Sheet C	1	2	3	4	5	6	7	8	9	10	Final
Scotland (Fraser)	0	0	2	0	3	0	1	1	1	X	8
United States (Beighton)	0	1	0	1	0	1	0	0	0	X	3

Sheet D	1	2	3	4	5	6	7	8	9	10	Final
Canada (Walker)	0	0	2	0	0	3	0	2	0	0	7
Switzerland (de Cruz)	0	1	0	1	1	0	4	0	1	1	9

Sheet E	1	2	3	4	5	6	7	8	9	10	Final
Norway (Mellemseter)	0	2	1	0	0	0	3	0	0	1	7
Denmark (Krause)	0	0	0	3	1	0	0	0	1	0	5

==== Draw, 8 ====
Thursday, March 11, 8:00

Sheet A	1	2	3	4	5	6	7	8	9	10	Final
Switzerland (de Cruz)	2	0	0	1	0	1	0	1	1	X	6
Norway (Mellemseter)	0	0	0	0	1	0	2	0	0	X	3

Sheet B	1	2	3	4	5	6	7	8	9	10	Final
Scotland (Fraser)	0	0	0	0	1	0	0	2	0	1	4
Canada (Walker)	0	1	0	0	0	0	1	0	0	0	2

Sheet C	1	2	3	4	5	6	7	8	9	10	Final
Finland (Hakunti)	1	2	1	0	1	1	1	0	1	X	8
Denmark (Krause)	0	0	0	2	0	0	0	2	0	X	4

Sheet D	1	2	3	4	5	6	7	8	9	10	Final
Sweden (Mabergs)	0	0	1	0	0	1	0	0	X	X	2
China (Ji)	1	2	0	1	0	0	1	2	X	X	7

Sheet E	1	2	3	4	5	6	7	8	9	10	Final
Russia (Bolduzev)	0	0	1	0	2	0	0	0	0	0	3
United States (Beighton)	0	1	0	1	0	0	2	1	1	1	7

==== Draw, 9 ====
Thursday, March 11, 17:00

Sheet A	1	2	3	4	5	6	7	8	9	10	Final
Scotland (Fraser)	1	1	1	0	4	0	1	X	X	X	8
Denmark (Krause)	0	0	0	2	0	1	0	X	X	X	3

Sheet B	1	2	3	4	5	6	7	8	9	10	Final
Norway (Mellemseter)	0	0	3	0	0	0	0	X	X	X	3
China (Ji)	2	1	0	0	1	3	1	X	X	X	8

Sheet C	1	2	3	4	5	6	7	8	9	10	Final
Canada (Walker)	0	1	0	0	1	0	0	0	2	0	4
Russia (Bolduzev)	0	0	1	0	0	0	0	1	0	1	3

Sheet D	1	2	3	4	5	6	7	8	9	10	Final
Finland (Hakunti)	0	1	0	2	1	0	3	1	X	X	8
United States (Beighton)	0	0	1	0	0	1	0	0	X	X	2

Sheet E	1	2	3	4	5	6	7	8	9	10	Final
Switzerland (de Cruz)	0	0	2	1	0	0	0	1	0	1	5
Sweden (Mabergs)	0	1	0	0	0	2	1	0	0	0	4

=== Tiebreaker ===
Friday, April 12, 14:00

Sheet A	1	2	3	4	5	6	7	8	9	10	Final
Canada (Walker)	2	0	0	1	0	1	0	3	1	X	8
Norway (Mellemseter)	0	1	0	0	1	0	2	0	0	X	4

=== Playoffs ===
Page playoff system
1	Scotland	6
2	China	3
3	Switzerland	5
4	Canada	4

Semifinal
2	China	3
3	Switzerland	4

Gold-medal game
1	Scotland	6
3	Switzerland	7

Bronze-medal game
2	China	1
4	Canada	7

==== 1 vs. 2 Game ====
Saturday, April 14, 12:00

Sheet B	1	2	3	4	5	6	7	8	9	10	Final
Scotland (Fraser)	2	0	0	2	0	0	1	0	0	1	6
China (Ji)	0	0	2	0	0	0	0	0	1	0	3

==== 3 vs. 4 Game ====
Saturday, April 14, 12:00

Sheet D	1	2	3	4	5	6	7	8	9	10	Final
Switzerland (de Cruz)	1	0	0	0	2	0	0	0	0	2	5
Canada (Walker)	0	0	1	1	0	0	0	2	0	0	4

==== Semifinal ====
Saturday, April 14, 18:00

Sheet C	1	2	3	4	5	6	7	8	9	10	Final
China (Ji)	0	0	0	1	0	0	0	1	1	0	3
Switzerland (de Cruz)	0	0	0	0	1	1	0	0	0	2	4

==== Bronze-medal game ====
Sunday, April 14, 13:00

Sheet E	1	2	3	4	5	6	7	8	9	10	Final
China (Ji)	0	0	0	0	0	1	0	0	X	X	1
Canada (Walker)	1	1	2	1	0	0	2	0	X	X	7

==== Gold-medal game ====
Sunday, April 14, 13:00

Sheet C	1	2	3	4	5	6	7	8	9	10	Final
Scotland (Fraser)	2	0	0	0	2	0	1	1	0	0	6
Switzerland (de Cruz)	0	0	1	1	0	2	0	0	2	1	7

== Women ==
=== Teams ===
Country	Skip	Third	Second	Lead	Alternate
Canada	Rachel Homan	Emma Miskew	Laura Crocker	Lynn Kreviazuk	Alison Kreviazuk
China	Liu Sijia	Liu Jinli	Zheng Chunmei	Jiang Yilun	She Qiutong
Czech Republic	Anna Kubešková	Tereza Plíšková	Martina Strnadová	Zuzana Hájková	Veronika Herdova
France	Marie Coulot	Aurélie Baliff^{1}	Anna Li	Manon Humbert	
Germany	Corinna Scholz	Martina Linder	Leah Andrews	Angelina Terrey	Sina Hiltensberger
Russia	Anna Sidorova	Margarita Fomina	Ekaterina Galkina	Galina Arsenkina	Ekaterina Antonova
Scotland	Lauren Gray	Claire MacDonald	Tasha Aitken	Caitlin Barr	Anna Sloan
Sweden	Anna Hasselborg	Jonna McManus	Agnes Knochenhauer	Sara McManus	Anna Huhta
Switzerland	Manuela Siegrist	Imogen Lehmann	Claudia Hug	Janine Wyss	Corinne Rupp
United States	Alexandra Carlson	Tabitha Peterson	Tara Peterson	Sophie Brorson	Miranda Solem

^{1}Originally Solène Coulot was to play third until her untimely death on February 20, 2010.

=== Round-robin standings ===
Final round-robin standings

Key
Teams to Playoffs

Country	Skip	W	L
Canada	Rachel Homan	8	1
Sweden	Anna Hasselborg	7	2
United States	Alexandra Carlson	6	3
Switzerland	Manuela Siegrist	6	3
Russia	Anna Sidorova	5	4
China	Liu Sijia	3	6
Czech Republic	Anna Kubešková	3	6
France	Marie Coulot	3	6
Scotland	Lauren Gray	2	7
Germany	Corinna Scholz	2	7

=== Round-robin results ===
==== Draw 1 ====
Saturday, March 6, 9:00

Sheet A	1	2	3	4	5	6	7	8	9	10	Final
Canada (Homan)	0	2	1	1	0	6	0	2	X	X	12
China (Liu)	0	0	0	0	2	0	1	0	X	X	3

Sheet B	1	2	3	4	5	6	7	8	9	10	Final
Czech Republic (Kubesková)	1	0	0	1	0	1	0	3	2	1	9
Scotland (Gray)	0	3	2	0	0	0	3	0	0	0	8

Sheet C	1	2	3	4	5	6	7	8	9	10	Final
Russia (Sidorova)	2	0	0	1	1	2	1	1	0	X	8
France (Coulot)	0	2	0	0	0	0	0	0	1	X	3

Sheet D	1	2	3	4	5	6	7	8	9	10	Final
United States (Carlson)	0	0	1	0	0	3	0	0	0	X	4
Sweden (Hasselborg)	0	1	0	3	1	0	2	0	3	X	10

Sheet E	1	2	3	4	5	6	7	8	9	10	Final
Switzerland (Siegrist)	0	1	0	0	1	3	0	3	0	0	8
Germany (Scholz)	2	0	1	0	0	0	2	0	1	1	7

==== Draw 2 ====
Saturday, March 6, 19:00

Sheet A	1	2	3	4	5	6	7	8	9	10	Final
Switzerland (Siegrist)	2	0	0	3	1	2	0	1	X	X	9
Scotland (Gray)	0	2	0	0	0	0	1	0	X	X	3

Sheet B	1	2	3	4	5	6	7	8	9	10	Final
Germany (Scholz)	0	2	1	0	1	0	3	0	3	X	10
France (Coulot)	0	0	0	3	0	2	0	1	0	X	6

Sheet C	1	2	3	4	5	6	7	8	9	10	Final
Canada (Homan)	0	1	2	0	2	0	1	2	0	X	8
United States (Carlson)	1	0	0	1	0	1	0	0	2	X	5

Sheet D	1	2	3	4	5	6	7	8	9	10	Final
Russia (Sidorova)	1	0	0	1	0	0	3	0	0	0	5
China (Liu)	0	2	0	0	2	1	0	1	0	1	7

Sheet E	1	2	3	4	5	6	7	8	9	10	Final
Czech Republic (Kubesková)	0	2	0	2	1	0	0	0	0	0	5
Sweden (Hasselborg)	0	0	3	0	0	0	0	1	1	1	6

==== Draw 3 ====
Sunday, March 7, 14:00

Sheet A	1	2	3	4	5	6	7	8	9	10	Final
Sweden (Hasselborg)	0	1	0	1	0	1	0	1	2	X	6
Germany (Scholz)	0	0	0	0	1	0	2	0	0	X	3

Sheet B	1	2	3	4	5	6	7	8	9	10	Final
United States (Carlson)	0	0	2	1	0	0	2	1	0	1	7
China (Liu)	1	0	0	0	2	1	0	0	1	0	5

Sheet C	1	2	3	4	5	6	7	8	9	10	Final
Czech Republic (Kubesková)	0	0	1	0	1	0	0	X	X	X	2
Switzerland (Siegrist)	2	2	0	1	0	1	3	X	X	X	9

Sheet D	1	2	3	4	5	6	7	8	9	10	Final
France (Coulot)	0	1	0	0	1	0	X	X	X	X	2
Canada (Homan)	3	0	3	2	0	4	X	X	X	X	12

Sheet E	1	2	3	4	5	6	7	8	9	10	Final
Russia (Sidorova)	2	0	0	2	1	0	1	0	0	X	6
Scotland (Gray)	0	1	0	0	0	2	0	0	1	X	4

==== Draw 4 ====
Monday, March 8, 9:00

Sheet A	1	2	3	4	5	6	7	8	9	10	Final
China (Liu)	2	0	1	0	2	0	1	0	1	0	7
Czech Republic (Kubesková)	0	1	0	2	0	2	0	1	0	0	6

Sheet B	1	2	3	4	5	6	7	8	9	10	Final
Canada (Homan)	0	3	0	0	2	0	2	0	1	0	8
Russia (Sidorova)	0	0	1	2	0	1	0	2	0	1	7

Sheet C	1	2	3	4	5	6	7	8	9	10	Final
Scotland (Gray)	0	1	0	0	0	0	0	0	0	X	1
Germany (Scholz)	1	0	0	0	0	0	1	1	1	X	4

Sheet D	1	2	3	4	5	6	7	8	9	10	Final
Sweden (Hasselborg)	0	0	1	0	2	0	0	2	0	3	8
Switzerland (Siegrist)	1	1	0	1	0	2	0	0	0	0	5

Sheet E	1	2	3	4	5	6	7	8	9	10	Final
United States (Carlson)	1	0	1	0	2	0	2	0	2	X	8
France (Coulot)	0	0	0	1	0	3	0	1	0	X	5

==== Draw 5 ====
Monday, March 8, 19:00

Sheet A	1	2	3	4	5	6	7	8	9	10	11	Final
Russia (Sidorova)	1	1	0	2	0	0	0	2	0	0	0	6
Switzerland (Siegrist)	0	0	2	0	0	1	1	0	0	2	1	7

Sheet B	1	2	3	4	5	6	7	8	9	10	Final
France (Coulot)	1	0	1	0	1	0	1	3	1	X	8
Czech Republic (Kubesková)	0	1	0	1	0	1	0	0	0	X	3

Sheet C	1	2	3	4	5	6	7	8	9	10	Final
Sweden (Hasselborg)	0	1	0	0	1	1	0	1	1	X	5
China (Liu)	0	0	0	0	0	0	1	0	0	X	1

Sheet D	1	2	3	4	5	6	7	8	9	10	Final
Scotland (Gray)	0	0	0	2	2	0	2	0	0	0	6
United States (Carlson)	1	0	0	0	0	2	0	2	0	2	7

Sheet E	1	2	3	4	5	6	7	8	9	10	Final
Germany (Scholz)	0	0	0	0	1	1	0	1	0	X	3
Canada (Homan)	0	0	1	1	0	0	1	0	3	X	6

==== Draw 6 ====
Tuesday, March 9, 13:30

Sheet A	1	2	3	4	5	6	7	8	9	10	Final
Germany (Scholz)	1	0	1	0	0	1	0	0	0	X	3
United States (Carlson)	0	1	0	1	1	0	2	2	4	X	11

Sheet B	1	2	3	4	5	6	7	8	9	10	Final
Sweden (Hasselborg)	0	1	0	0	0	1	1	0	1	0	4
Canada (Homan)	0	0	0	2	1	0	0	2	0	1	6

Sheet C	1	2	3	4	5	6	7	8	9	10	Final
France (Coulot)	0	0	1	0	0	2	0	0	X	X	3
Scotland (Gray)	2	0	0	1	1	0	3	1	X	X	8

Sheet D	1	2	3	4	5	6	7	8	9	10	Final
Czech Republic (Kubesková)	0	1	0	1	0	0	1	0	X	X	3
Russia (Sidorova)	1	0	2	0	2	1	0	3	X	X	9

Sheet E	1	2	3	4	5	6	7	8	9	10	Final
China (Liu)	0	0	0	1	0	1	0	1	1	X	4
Switzerland (Siegrist)	2	2	1	0	2	0	1	0	0	X	8

==== Draw 7 ====
Wednesday, March 10, 9:00

Sheet A	1	2	3	4	5	6	7	8	9	10	Final
Scotland (Gray)	1	0	1	0	0	1	0	3	0	0	6
Canada (Homan)	0	1	0	2	2	0	1	0	0	1	7

Sheet B	1	2	3	4	5	6	7	8	9	10	Final
China (Liu)	1	0	1	0	0	0	0	0	2	1	5
Germany (Scholz)	0	1	0	0	0	0	2	1	0	0	4

Sheet C	1	2	3	4	5	6	7	8	9	10	Final
United States (Carlson)	1	0	0	2	0	0	1	0	0	X	4
Czech Republic (Kubesková)	0	1	1	0	2	2	0	0	1	X	7

Sheet D	1	2	3	4	5	6	7	8	9	10	Final
Switzerland (Siegrist)	0	0	1	0	1	0	0	0	X	X	2
France (Coulot)	0	1	0	4	0	1	1	1	X	X	8

Sheet E	1	2	3	4	5	6	7	8	9	10	Final
Sweden (Hasselborg)	0	0	0	2	0	1	0	0	1	0	4
Russia (Sidorova)	0	0	3	0	2	0	0	1	0	1	7

==== Draw 8 ====
Wednesday, March 10, 19:00

Sheet A	1	2	3	4	5	6	7	8	9	10	Final
France (Coulot)	0	1	0	1	0	0	0	2	0	X	4
Sweden (Hasselborg)	2	0	2	0	0	0	3	0	4	X	11

Sheet B	1	2	3	4	5	6	7	8	9	10	11	Final
Switzerland (Siegrist)	0	1	0	1	0	0	3	0	2	0	0	7
United States (Carlson)	1	0	3	0	0	1	0	0	0	2	1	8

Sheet C	1	2	3	4	5	6	7	8	9	10	Final
Germany (Scholz)	0	1	0	2	0	0	0	0	1	X	4
Russia (Sidorova)	1	0	1	0	2	0	1	1	0	X	6

Sheet D	1	2	3	4	5	6	7	8	9	10	Final
China (Liu)	0	1	0	0	0	1	0	0	X	X	2
Scotland (Gray)	1	0	0	3	0	0	2	2	X	X	8

Sheet E	1	2	3	4	5	6	7	8	9	10	Final
Canada (Homan)	1	0	1	1	2	0	4	X	X	X	9
Czech Republic (Kubesková)	0	1	0	0	0	2	0	X	X	X	3

==== Draw 9 ====
Thursday, March 11, 12:30

Sheet A	1	2	3	4	5	6	7	8	9	10	Final
United States (Carlson)	0	1	1	0	0	2	0	0	1	1	6
Russia (Sidorova)	2	0	0	0	1	0	0	2	0	0	5

Sheet B	1	2	3	4	5	6	7	8	9	10	Final
Scotland (Gray)	0	1	0	0	0	1	0	0	0	X	2
Sweden (Hasselborg)	1	0	0	1	2	0	1	0	1	X	6

Sheet C	1	2	3	4	5	6	7	8	9	10	Final
Switzerland (Siegrist)	1	0	2	0	1	0	2	0	1	1	8
Canada (Homan)	0	1	0	2	0	2	0	1	0	0	6

Sheet D	1	2	3	4	5	6	7	8	9	10	11	Final
Germany (Scholz)	1	0	2	0	1	0	0	2	1	1	0	8
Czech Republic (Kubesková)	0	2	0	1	0	3	2	0	0	0	2	10

Sheet E	1	2	3	4	5	6	7	8	9	10	Final
France (Coulot)	2	0	0	0	2	2	0	0	0	0	6
China (Liu)	0	1	0	0	0	0	1	0	2	1	5

=== Playoffs ===
Page playoff system
1	Canada	9
2	Sweden	3
3	United States	6
4	Switzerland	4

Semifinal
2	Sweden	6
3	United States	1

Gold-medal game
1	Canada	3
2	Sweden	8

Bronze-medal game
3	United States	9
4	Switzerland	7

==== 1 vs. 2 Game ====
Friday, April 12, 19:00

Sheet B	1	2	3	4	5	6	7	8	9	10	Final
Canada (Homan)	0	3	4	0	1	0	1	0	X	X	9
Sweden (Hasselborg)	0	0	0	1	0	1	0	1	X	X	3

==== 3 vs. 4 Game ====
Friday, April 12, 19:00

Sheet D	1	2	3	4	5	6	7	8	9	10	Final
United States (Carlson)	0	0	2	0	1	0	1	0	2	X	6
Switzerland (Siegrist)	0	1	0	1	0	1	0	1	0	X	4

==== Semifinal ====
Saturday, April 14, 18:00

Sheet E	1	2	3	4	5	6	7	8	9	10	Final
Sweden (Hasselborg)	0	1	1	1	1	0	1	1	0	X	6
United States (Carlson)	0	0	0	0	0	1	0	0	0	X	1

==== Bronze-medal game ====
Sunday, April 14, 9:00

Sheet A	1	2	3	4	5	6	7	8	9	10	11	Final
United States (Carlson)	0	0	0	3	2	1	0	1	0	0	2	9
Switzerland (Siegrist)	0	2	0	0	0	0	4	0	0	1	0	7

==== Gold-medal game ====
Sunday, April 14, 9:00

Sheet C	1	2	3	4	5	6	7	8	9	10	Final
Canada (Homan)	0	2	0	0	1	0	0	0	0	X	3
Sweden (Hasselborg)	1	0	0	1	0	1	2	2	1	X	8
