= Curling at the 2010 Winter Olympics =

Curling at the XXI Olympic Winter Games
- Venue: Vancouver Olympic/Paralympic Centre
- Dates: February 16–27, 2010
- Competitors: 100 from 12 nations

Men's curling at the XXI Olympic Winter Games

Medalists
1st place, gold medalist(s)		Canada
2nd place, silver medalist(s)		Norway
3rd place, bronze medalist(s)		Switzerland

Women's curling at the XXI Olympic Winter Games

Medalists
1st place, gold medalist(s)		Sweden
2nd place, silver medalist(s)		Canada
3rd place, bronze medalist(s)		China

The curling competition of the 2010 Olympics was held at Vancouver Olympic/Paralympic Centre in Vancouver. It is the fifth time that curling was on the Olympic program, after having been staged in 1924, 1998, 2002 and 2006. For the 2010 Winter Olympics, the competition followed the same format that was used during the 2006 Turin Winter Olympics, with 10 teams playing a round robin tournament, from which the top four teams advance to the semi-finals.

The women's competition concluded on Friday, February 26, 2010. In the bronze medal match, the Chinese team made history by becoming the first team from Asia to win an Olympic curling medal. The gold medal match was one of the closest medal games in Olympic competition. Team Canada won the silver medal, their best performance since the 1998 Nagano Olympic Games when Sandra Schmirler skipped the Canadians to gold. Team Sweden won the gold medal. Anette Norberg, Eva Lund, Cathrine Lindahl, and Anna Le Moine (née Anna Bergström [Anna Svärd in Torino]) became the first curlers to win two gold medals at the Olympic Games.

The men's competition concluded on Saturday, February 27, 2010. In the bronze medal match, Markus Eggler of Switzerland became the first male curler to win two Olympic medals. The gold medal final was a rematch between Canada and Norway of the 2002 Olympics men's final (although only one athlete from each team participated in both finals). The only disturbance was when an unsportsmanlike spectator deliberately blew a horn while the Norwegians were delivering their stones. The crowd promptly booed the man and the horn was not blown again until the medal ceremony. The Canadians controlled the game throughout and never relinquished the lead. Torger Nergård and Kevin Martin became the second and third men to win two Olympic medals.

With the conclusion of the Vancouver Olympic curling tournament, eight athletes now have two Olympic curling medals. They are in the order in which they received their medals: Mirjam Ott (SUI), Markus Eggler (SUI), Kevin Martin (CAN), Torger Nergård (NOR), Anette Norberg, Eva Lund, Cathrine Lindahl, and Anna Le Moine, all of Sweden.

== Medal summary ==
=== Medal table ===
Rank	Nation	Gold	Silver	Bronze	Total
1	Canada	1	1	0	2
2	Sweden	1	0	0	1
3	Norway	0	1	0	1
4	China	0	0	1	1
4	Switzerland	0	0	1	1
Totals (5 entries)		2	2	2	6

=== Events ===
Event	Gold	Silver	Bronze
Men's	Canada; Kevin Martin; John Morris; Marc Kennedy; Ben Hebert; Adam Enright	Norway; Thomas Ulsrud; Torger Nergård; Christoffer Svae; Håvard Vad Petersson; Thomas Løvold	Switzerland; Ralph Stöckli; Jan Hauser; Markus Eggler; Simon Strübin; Toni Müller
Women's	Sweden; Anette Norberg; Eva Lund; Cathrine Lindahl; Anna Le Moine; Kajsa Bergström	Canada; Cheryl Bernard; Susan O'Connor; Carolyn Darbyshire; Cori Bartel; Kristie Moore	China; Wang Bingyu; Liu Yin; Yue Qingshuang; Zhou Yan; Liu Jinli

== Qualified teams ==
=== Men's ===
Canada	China	Denmark	France	Germany
Saville SC, Edmonton Skip: Kevin Martin; Third: John Morris; Second: Marc Kennedy; Lead: Ben Hebert; Alternate: Adam Enright	Harbin CC, Harbin Fourth: Liu Rui; Skip: Wang Fengchun*; Second: Xu Xiaoming; Lead: Zang Jialiang; Alternate: Li Hongchen	Hvidovre CC, Hvidovre Fourth: Johnny Frederiksen; Skip: Ulrik Schmidt*; Second: Bo Jensen; Lead: Lars Vilandt; Alternate: Mikkel Poulsen	Chamonix CC, Chamonix Skip: Thomas Dufour; Third: Tony Angiboust; Second: Jan Ducroz; Lead: Richard Ducroz; Alternate: Raphael Mathieu	CC Füssen, Füssen Skip: Andy Kapp; Third: Andreas Lang; Second: Holger Höhne; Lead: Andreas Kempf; Alternate: Daniel Herberg
Great Britain	Norway	Sweden	Switzerland	United States
Lockerbie CC, Lockerbie Skip: David Murdoch; Third: Ewan MacDonald; Second: Peter Smith; Lead: Euan Byers; Alternate: Graeme Connal	Snarøen CK, Bærum Skip: Thomas Ulsrud; Third: Torger Nergård; Second: Christoffer Svae; Lead: Håvard Vad Petersson; Alternate: Thomas Løvold	Karlstads CK, Karlstad Skip: Niklas Edin; Third: Sebastian Kraupp; Second: Fredrik Lindberg; Lead: Viktor Kjäll; Alternate: Oskar Eriksson	CC St. Galler Bär, St. Gallen Fourth: Ralph Stöckli; Third: Jan Hauser; Skip: Markus Eggler**; Lead: Simon Strübin; Alternate: Toni Müller	Duluth CC, Duluth Skip: John Shuster; Third: Jason Smith; Second: Jeff Isaacson; Lead: John Benton; Alternate: Chris Plys

*Throws third rocks
**Throws second rocks

=== Women's ===
Canada	China	Denmark	Germany	Great Britain
Calgary WC, Calgary Skip: Cheryl Bernard; Third: Susan O'Connor; Second: Carolyn Darbyshire; Lead: Cori Bartel; Alternate: Kristie Moore	Harbin CC, Harbin Skip: Wang Bingyu; Third: Liu Yin; Second: Yue Qingshuang; Lead: Zhou Yan; Alternate: Liu Jinli	Tårnby CC, Tårnby Fourth: Madeleine Dupont; Third: Denise Dupont; Skip: Angelina Jensen*; Lead: Camilla Jensen; Alternate: Ane Hansen	SC Riessersee, Garmisch-Partenkirchen Skip: Andrea Schöpp; Third: Monika Wagner; Second: Melanie Robillard; Lead: Stella Heiß; Alternate: Corinna Scholz	British Olympic Committee Skip: Eve Muirhead; Third: Jackie Lockhart; Second: Kelly Wood; Lead: Lorna Vevers; Alternate: Anne Laird
Japan	Russia	Sweden	Switzerland	United States
Aomori CC, Aomori Skip: Moe Meguro; Third: Anna Ohmiya; Second: Mari Motohashi; Lead: Kotomi Ishizaki; Alternate: Mayo Yamaura	Moskvitch CC, Moscow Skip: Ludmila Privivkova; Third: Anna Sidorova**; Second: Nkeiruka Ezekh; Lead: Ekaterina Galkina; Alternate: Margarita Fomina	Härnösands CK, Härnösand Skip: Anette Norberg; Third: Eva Lund; Second: Cathrine Lindahl; Lead: Anna Le Moine; Alternate: Kajsa Bergström	Davos CC, Davos Skip: Mirjam Ott; Third: Carmen Schäfer; Second: Carmen Küng; Lead: Janine Greiner; Alternate: Irene Schori	Madison CC, Madison Skip: Debbie McCormick***; Third: Allison Pottinger***; Second: Nicole Joraanstad; Lead: Natalie Nicholson; Alternate: Tracy Sachtjen

*Throws second rocks

**The World Curling Federation had Olga Jarkova listed as the Third. However, a press release by the Vancouver Organizing Committee has Anna Sidorova listed as Third.

***On February 21, 2010, Debbie McCormick switched to throwing third, with Allison Pottinger throwing fourth.

=== Qualification ===
Performances at the 2007, 2008 and 2009 World Curling Championships decided which countries were able to send curling teams to the 2010 Olympics. Points were distributed in the following manner, with the top 9 teams (excluding hosts Canada) qualifying for the Olympics.

Position at WC	Number of points
1	14
2	12
3	10
4	9
5	8
6	7
7	6
8	5
9	4
10	3
11	2
12	1

In case of a tie during the 2007 World championships, the points were split (for example, if two teams tied for tenth place, they would receive 2.5 points). For the 2008 and 2009 championships, such ties were broken according to head-to-head matchups, and if necessary, by the draw shot challenge. Canada, as the host nation, qualified automatically. Scotland's points counted as Great Britain (Scotland does not compete at the Olympic level separately).

==== Men's standings ====
Country	2007	2008	2009	Total
Canada	14	14	12	40
Great Britain*	3.5	12	14	29.5
Germany	12	5	7	24
United States	10	6	8	24
Norway	3.5	10	10	23.5
Switzerland	9	2	9	20
France	6.5	8	5	19.5
Denmark	3.5	4	6	13.5
China	–	9	4	13
Sweden	8	3	–	11
Australia	3.5	7	–	10.5
Finland	6.5	–	1	7.5
Czech Republic	–	1	2	3
Japan	–	–	3	3
South Korea	1	–	–	1

*Scotland, England and Wales all compete separately in international curling. By an agreement between the curling federations of those three home nations, only Scotland can score Olympic qualification points for Great Britain.

==== Women's standings ====
Country	2007	2008	2009	Total
Canada	14	14	9	37
China	6	12	14	32
Denmark	12	8	10	30
Sweden	7.5	7	12	26.5
Switzerland	7.5	10	8	25.5
United States	9	6	4	19
Great Britain*	10	3	5	18
Russia	4	5	6	15
Germany	4	4	7	15
Japan	4	9	–	13
Italy	1.5	2	1	4.5
South Korea	–	–	3	3
Czech Republic	1.5	1	–	2.5
Norway	–	–	2	2

*Scotland, England and Wales all compete separately in international curling. By an agreement between the curling federations of those three home nations, only Scotland can score Olympic qualification points for Great Britain.

=== Olympic curling trials ===
- (Canada) 2009 Canadian Olympic Curling Trials
- 2010 United States Olympic Curling Trials
- (Switzerland) 2009 Swiss Olympic Curling Trials

== See also ==
- Wheelchair curling at the 2010 Winter Paralympics
