= Hillcrest Centre =

Athletic center in Vancouver, Canada

Coordinates: 49°14′40″N 123°6′29″W

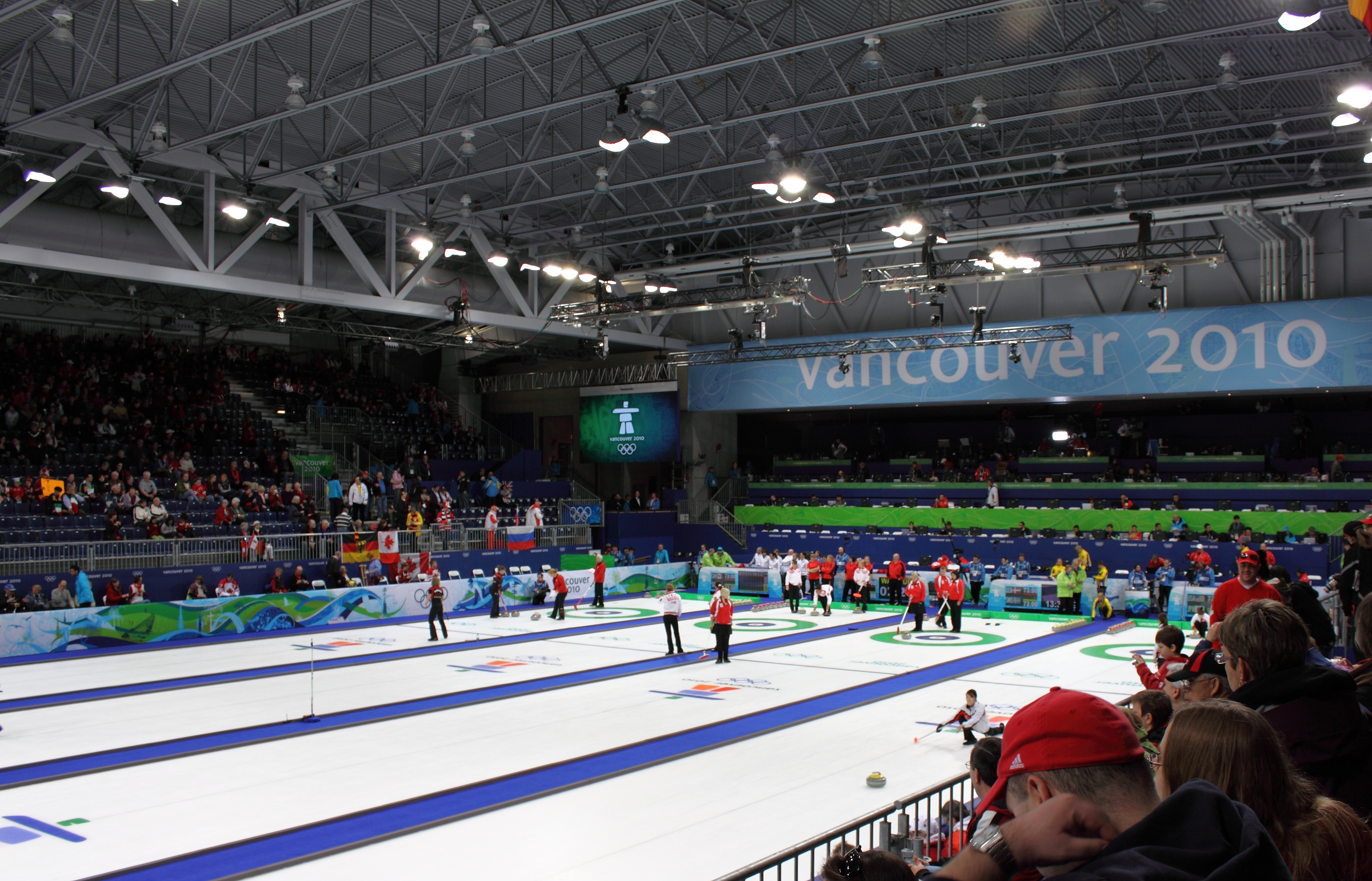
- Interactive map of Hillcrest Centre
- Full name: Hillcrest Centre
- Former names: Vancouver Olympic/Paralympic Centre
- Location: 4575 Clancy Loranger Way, Vancouver, British Columbia, Canada
- Capacity: 6,000

Construction
- Groundbreaking: 2007
- Opened: 2009 (curling venue)
- Expanded: 2011 (post-Games legacy facility)
- Cost: $39.05 million for the curling venue; an additional $48.8 million for post-Games conversion and Percy Norman Aquatic Centre
- Architect: Hughes Condon Marler Architects

Tenant
- Vancouver Curling Club (2011–present)

The Hillcrest Centre is a community centre with ice hockey, curling rinks, and an aquatics facility, located at Hillcrest Park in Vancouver, British Columbia, Canada. Construction started in March 2007; it hosted the 2009 World Junior Curling Championships prior to the Olympics. During the 2010 Olympics, it was named the Vancouver Olympic/Paralympic Centre and had a capacity of 6,000 people to host curling at the 2010 Winter Olympics; for the 2010 Paralympics, it hosted the Wheelchair Curling event.

== Design ==
=== Sustainability features ===
The centre was built to qualify for the Leadership in Energy and Environmental Design Scale (LEED) Gold certification; for example, the centre's refrigeration plant is designed to heat other areas of the building and the adjacent aquatic centre through the utilization of what is otherwise waste heat from cooling the ice surface. Surrounding ground water will also be collected for use in the facility's toilets.

Smart site selection is key to maintaining the centre's green footprint; the new facility replaces a much older community complex, with the new curling complex built on a gravel parking lot. Federal (CEAA) environmental assessment review process was also applied to the selection of the site. Trees that were affected during the construction of the venue were moved to other areas of the park, and any land created from the demolition of the old community centre will be turned into community green space during post-Games conversion.

=== Aboriginal participation ===
Aboriginal artwork was installed at the venue as part of the Vancouver 2010 Venues Aboriginal Arts Program. Featured art includes traditional, and contemporary artwork by First Nations, Inuit and Metis artists from across Canada.

== Post Olympics ==
After the 2010 Olympic games, the centre was converted into a multi-purpose recreation centre that includes a hockey rink, gymnasium, library, eight sheets of curling ice and a lounge for the curlers. Connected to the facility via an indoor concourse will is the Percy Norman Aquatic Centre, which features a leisure tank, a 50m lap pool and an outdoor aquatic area.

After the Olympics, the Vancouver Curling Club moved into the centre. The Club hosts the Pacific Rim Curling League, one of Canada's oldest LGBT curling leagues and one of British Columbia's largest. The league and the Hillcrest Centre hosted the Canadian Gay Curling Championships in 2012.
