= Liu Rui (curler) =

Chinese curler

Liu Rui 刘锐
- Curler ♂
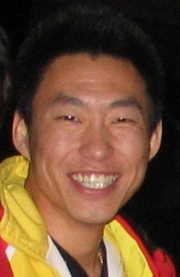
- Born: March 13, 1982 (age 44); Harbin, Heilongjiang

Team
- Curling club: Harbin CC, Harbin, Heilongjiang
- Skip: Liu Rui
- Third: Xu Xiaoming
- Second: Jiang Dongxu
- Lead: Zang Jialiang
- Alternate: Ma Yanlong

Curling career
- World Championship: 7 (2008, 2009, 2010, 2012, 2013, 2014, 2017)
- Pacific-Asia Championship: 10 (2002, 2005, 2006, 2007, 2008, 2009, 2011, 2012, 2013, 2016)
- Olympic: 2 (2010, 2014)
Medal record
Men's curling
Representing China
Pacific-Asia Championships
Gold medal – first place	2007 Beijing
Gold medal – first place	2008 Naseby
Gold medal – first place	2009 Karuizawa
Gold medal – first place	2011 Nanjing
Gold medal – first place	2012 Naseby
Gold medal – first place	2013 Shanghai
Silver medal – second place	2016 Uiseong
Bronze medal – third place	2006 Tokyo
Winter Universiade
Bronze medal – third place	2009 Harbin
Asian Winter Games
Gold medal – first place	2017 Sapporo
Bronze medal – third place	2007 Changchun

Liu Rui (simplified Chinese: 刘锐; traditional Chinese: 劉銳; pinyin: Liú Ruì; born March 13, 1982, in Harbin, Heilongjiang; sometimes known as Rui Lui) is a Chinese curler. He was the skip of the Chinese men's Olympic Curling Team at the 2014 Winter Olympics.

Liu played in his first World Curling Championships in 2008, playing third for Fengchun Wang. The team lost in the bronze medal game to Norway, settling for fourth place. After a slow start in the 2009 Ford World Men's Curling Championship, Liu switched to throw 4th stones while skip Fengchun Wang continued to call the game and throw 3rd stones. The team struggled, placing 9th. The team represented China at the 2010 Winter Olympics, with Liu throwing last rocks and Wang continuing to skip. The team finished 8th with a 2–7 record.

After the Olympics, Liu took over skipping the team, leading China at the 2010 World Men's Curling Championship, placing 11th. He led China to a 6th place finish at the 2012 World Men's Curling Championship, the 2013 Ford World Men's Curling Championship and at the 2014 World Men's Curling Championship.

== Personal life ==
He is married.

== Teams ==
Event	Skip	Third	Second	Lead	Alternate	Result
2002 PCC	Xu Xiaoming	Wang Fengchun	Zhu Yu	Liu Rui	Ma Yongjun	5th (3–7)
2005 PCC	Xu Xiaoming	Li Hongchen	Wang Fengchun	Liu Rui	Ma Yongjun	4th (5–4)
2006 PCC	Wang Binjiang	Wang Fengchun	Xu Xiaoming	Liu Rui	Zang Jialiang	3rd (5–4)
2007 AWG	Wang Binjiang	Wang Fengchun	Liu Rui	Xu Xiaoming	Zang Jialiang	3rd (4–3)
2007 PCC	Wang Fengchun	Xu Xiaoming	Liu Rui	Zhang Zhipeng	Zang Jialiang	1st (6–2)
2008 WCC	Wang Fengchun	Liu Rui	Xu Xiaoming	Zang Jialiang	Li Dongyan	4th (7–6)
2008 PCC	Wang Fengchun	Liu Rui	Xu Xiaoming	Zang Jialiang	Chen Lu'an	1st (10–3)
2009 Winter Universiade	Wang Fengchun	Liu Rui	Xu Xiaoming	Zang Jialiang	Chen Lu'an	3rd (8–4)
2009 WCC	Wang Fengchun	Liu Rui	Xu Xiaoming	Zang Jialiang	Chen Lu'an	9th (4–7)
2009 PCC	Wang Fengchun	Liu Rui	Xu Xiaoming	Li Hongchen	Zang Jialiang	1st (12–0)
2010 OWG	Liu Rui	Wang Fengchun	Xu Xiaoming	Zang Jialiang	Li Hongchen	T-8th (2–7)
2010 WCC	Liu Rui	Xu Xiaoming	Wang Fengchun	Zang Jialiang	Ba Dexin	11th (3–8)
2011 PCC	Liu Rui	Xu Xiaoming	Ba Dexin	Chen Lu'an	Zang Jialiang	1st (11–1)
2012 WCC	Liu Rui	Xu Xiaoming	Ba Dexin	Zang Jialiang	Chen Lu'an	6th (6–5)
2012 PCC	Liu Rui	Xu Xiaoming	Zang Jialiang	Ba Dexin	Zou Dejia	1st (8–1)
2013 WCC	Liu Rui	Xu Xiaoming	Ba Dexin	Zang Jialiang	Zou Dejia	6th (6–5)
2013 PCC	Liu Rui	Xu Xiaoming	Ba Dexin	Zang Jialiang	Zou Dejia	1st (8–4)
2014 OWG	Liu Rui	Xu Xiaoming	Ba Dexin	Zang Jialiang	Zou Dejia	4th (7–4)
2014 WCC	Liu Rui	Xu Xiaoming	Ba Dexin	Zang Jialiang	Zou Dejia	6th (6–5)
2017 WCC	Liu Rui	Xu Xiaoming	Ba Dexin	Zang Jialiang	Zou Qiang	5th (6–5)

Liu was also part of the 2008 Continental Cup of Curling.

== Grand Slam record ==
Key
C	Champion
F	Lost in Final
SF	Lost in Semifinal
QF	Lost in Quarterfinals
R16	Lost in the round of 16
Q	Did not advance to playoffs
T2	Played in Tier 2 event
DNP	Did not participate in event
N/A	Not a Grand Slam event that season

Event	2008–09	2009–10	2010–11	2011–12	2012–13	2013–14	2014–15	2015–16	2016–17	2017–18
Masters / World Cup	DNP	Q	DNP	DNP	DNP	SF	DNP	DNP	DNP	DNP
The National	Q	DNP	DNP	DNP	DNP	DNP	DNP	DNP	DNP	Q
Canadian Open	DNP	DNP	DNP	DNP	DNP	DNP	DNP	DNP	DNP	Q
Players'	DNP	DNP	DNP	DNP	DNP	DNP	DNP	DNP	DNP	DNP
