= Wang Fengchun =

Chinese curler

- Curler
- Born: February 2, 1982 (age 44); Harbin, Heilongjiang

Team
- Curling club: Harbin CC, Harbin, CHN
- Skip: Wang Fengchun
- Third: Jiang Donxu
- Second: Yuan Mingjie
- Lead: Cheng Kuo
- Alternate: Li Hongbo

Curling career
- World Championship: 2 (2008, 2009)
- Pacific-Asia Championship: 7 (2002, 2004, 2005, 2006, 2007, 2008, 2009)
Medal record
Curling
Pacific Championships
Gold medal – first place	2007 Beijing
Gold medal – first place	2008 Naseby
Bronze medal – third place	2006 Tokyo
Asian Winter Games
Bronze medal – third place	2003 Aomori
Bronze medal – third place	2007 Changchun
New Zealand Winter Games
Silver medal – second place	2009 Naseby
Universiade
Bronze medal – third place	2009 Harbin

Wang Fengchun (Chinese: 王奉春; pinyin: Wáng Fèngchūn; born February 2, 1982, in Harbin, Heilongjiang; usually referred to in the media as Fengchun Wang) is a Chinese curler. He is the skip of the national team.

Wang was selected by the Chinese government to play the sport of curling. In China, the national team curls as their profession. By 2002, he played in his first international event- when he played third for Xu Xiaoming at the Pacific Curling Championships. The Chinese team finished fifth that year. He also played in the 2004 and 2005 Pacific Championships, finishing fourth both years before winning the bronze medal at the 2006 Pacific Championships.

In 2007, he played in his last tournament as third for Xu, when China won a bronze at the Asian Winter Games. He was promoted as skip after that. In November that year, China won the gold medal at the Pacific Curling Championships, qualifying the country for their first ever World Championships.

The 2007-08 season was a very successful season for the Chinese team, as they had some success on the World Curling Tour. Their record at the end of the season was 16-18, and included wins against former World Champion Rick Folk and 1998 Olympic silver medallist Mike Harris.

At the 2008 World Men's Curling Championship, the Chinese team made the playoffs in their first appearance, and among their round robin victories was a victory over Canada, skipped by World Curling Tour Champion, Kevin Martin.

Wang skipped his team to a 9th-place finish at the 2009 World Championship, highlighted with a round robin victory over the eventual champion Scotland, skipped by David Murdoch. With this result, China qualified for a spot at the 2010 Winter Olympics.

At the 2010 Winter Olympics, Wang and Liu Rui switched throwing positions in China's team lineup with Wang moving from fourth to third, and Liu moving from third to fourth. Wang remained skip while throwing third stones. After losing to Germany in their seventh match and dropping to a record of one win and six losses, Wang was replaced as skip by alternate Li Hongchen and did not play in China's last two games against the United States and Canada. China finished 8th, with a 2–7 record in round robin play.

Following his return to China after the completion of the Olympic Games, Wang was rebuked by Chinese curling officials for wearing a U.S. team cap at the Beijing Capital International Airport.

== Teams ==
Season	Skip	Third	Second	Lead	Alternate	Events
2002–03	Xu Xiaoming	Wang Fengchun	Zhu Yu	Liu Rui	Ma Yongjun	2002 PCC
2005–06	Xu Xiaoming	Li Hongchen	Wang Fengchun	Liu Rui	Ma Yongjun	2005 PCC
2007–08	Wang Fengchun	Liu Rui	Xu Xiaoming	Zang Jialiang	Li Dongyan	2008 WMCC
2008–09	Wang Fengchun	Liu Rui	Xu Xiaoming	Zang Jialiang	Chen Lu'an	2009 WMCC
2009–10	Liu Rui (fourth)	Wang Fengchun (skip)	Xu Xiaoming	Zang Jialiang	Li Hongchen	2010 Olympic Games

== Awards ==
- Colin Campbell Award – 2009
