= Zou Dejia =

Chinese curler

Zou Dejia 邹德佳
- Curler
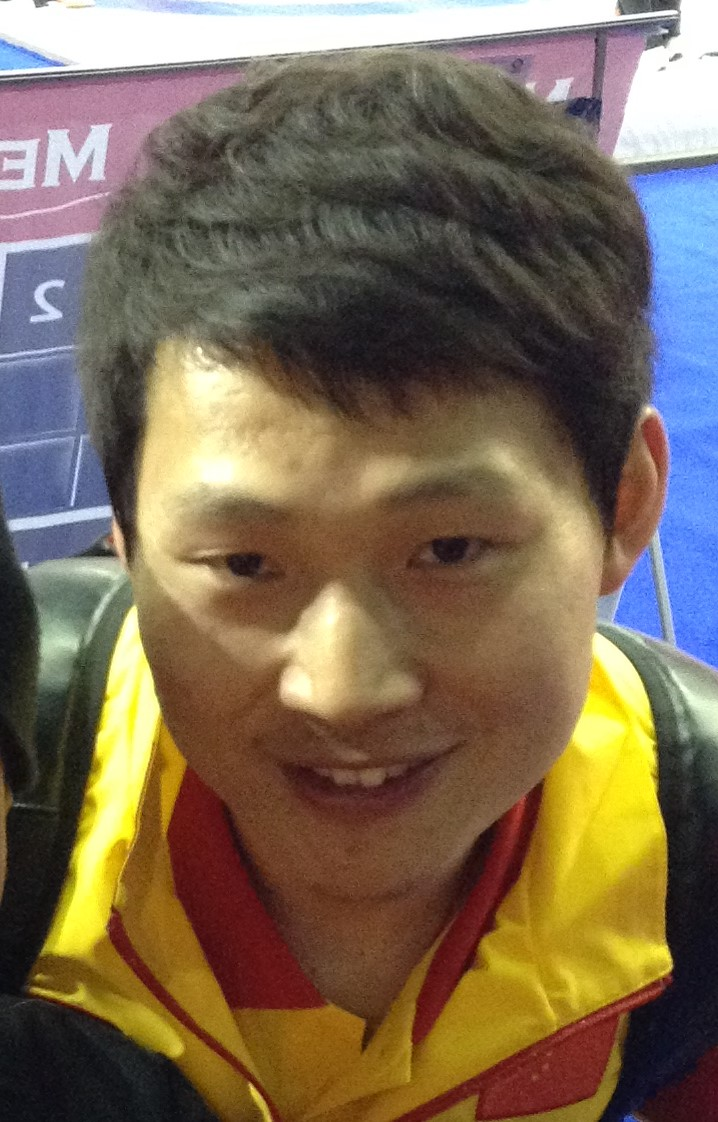
- Zou at the 2015 World Men's Curling Championship
- Born: April 7, 1983 (age 43); Harbin, Heilongjiang

Team
- Curling club: Harbin CC, Harbin
- Mixed doubles partner: Fu Yiwei

Curling career
- Member Association: China
- World Championship: 4 (2013, 2014, 2015, 2018)
- World Mixed Doubles Championship: 2 (2011, 2019)
- Pacific-Asia Championship: 4 (2012, 2013, 2014, 2017)
- Olympic: 1 (2014)
Medal record
Men's curling
Representing China
Pacific-Asia Championships
Gold medal – first place	2012 Naseby
Gold medal – first place	2013 Shanghai
Gold medal – first place	2014 Kariuzawa
Silver medal – second place	2017 Erina

Zou Dejia (simplified Chinese: 邹德佳; traditional Chinese: 鄒德佳; pinyin: Zōu Déjiā; born April 7, 1983) is a Chinese curler from Harbin.

== Career ==
In 2007, Zou skipped the Chinese team at the 2007 Winter Universiade. The rink finished with a 4–5 record, missing the medal round and placing fifth.

Zou's second international event was at the 2011 World Mixed Doubles Curling Championship where he and team mate Li Xue represented China. The pair finished the round robin with a 5–2 record, and won their qualification game against Finland to make the playoffs. However, they lost in the quarter-final to Sweden.

In 2012, Zou became the skip of the second Chinese team on the World Curling Tour. His first WCT tour event win as a skip came at the 2012 Horizon Laser Vision Center Classic where he beat Brent Gedak in the final. That year Zou became the alternate on the Chinese national team (skipped by Liu Rui), while skipping his own team on the World Curling Tour. While he didn't play in any games in either event, the team won a gold medal at the 2012 Pacific-Asia Curling Championships and finished sixth at the 2013 Ford World Men's Curling Championship. The team won another gold medal at the 2013 Pacific-Asia Curling Championships and represented China at the 2014 Winter Olympics, finishing in fourth place. The team also played in the 2014 World Men's Curling Championship, placing sixth. Zou played in two games at the Pacific-Asia Championship, but none at the Olympics or Worlds.

In 2014, Zou joined the Zang Jialiang team at third. This team would win a gold medal at the 2014 Pacific-Asia Curling Championships and place 8th at the 2015 Ford World Men's Curling Championship. Zou left the team in 2015 to skip his own team.

As the skip of the Chinese team, Zou won a silver medal at the 2017 Pacific-Asia Curling Championships. After going 6-2 after the round robin, the team would defeat hosts Australia in the semifinal but would lose to the Koreans in the final. He would skip the Chinese team at the 2018 World Men's Curling Championship to a 3-9 record, in 12th place.

Zou returned to the World Mixed Doubles Curling Championship in 2019 with partner Fu Yiwei. The pair went on to finish 19th.
