= Li Hongchen =

Chinese Curler

Li Hongchen (Chinese: 李洪臣; pinyin: Lǐ Hóngchén; born October 29, 1975, in Mudanjiang, Heilongjiang) is a curler from China who trains out of Harbin.

Most of Li's experience at the world level has been as a coach, mainly working with the women and junior teams from 2003 to 2009.

He was added to the Chinese national team at the beginning of the 2009/2010 season. Some sources list him as the Lead for the team; however, the official release from the World Curling Federation lists him as the Alternate for the Chinese Olympic Team.

== Teammates ==
2010 Vancouver Olympic Games

- Wang Fengchun, Skip
- Liu Rui, Third
- Xu Xiaoming, Second
- Zang Jialang, Lead

Event	Skip	Third	Second	Lead	Alternate	Result
2005 PCC	Xu Xiaoming	Li Hongchen	Wang Fengchun	Liu Rui	Ma Yongjun	4th (5–4)
2009 PCC	Wang Fengchun	Liu Rui	Xu Xiaoming	Li Hongchen	Zang Jialiang	1st (12–0)
2010 OG	Wang Fengchun	Liu Rui	Xu Xiaoming	Zang Jialiang	Li Hongchen	8th
