= Zang Jialiang =

Chinese curler

Zang Jialiang 臧嘉亮
- Curler
- Born: January 12, 1988 (age 38); Harbin, Heilongjiang

Team
- Curling club: Harbin CC, Harbin, Heilongjiang, CHN
- Skip: Liu Rui
- Third: Xu Xiaoming
- Second: Ba Dexin
- Lead: Zang Jialiang
- Alternate: Zou Qiang

Curling career
- World Championship: 8 (2008, 2009, 2010, 2012, 2013, 2014, 2015, 2017)
- Pacific-Asia Championship: 11 (2006, 2007, 2008, 2009, 2010, 2011, 2012, 2013, 2014, 2015, 2016)
- Olympic: 2 (2010, 2014)
Medal record
Men's curling
Representing China
Pacific-Asia Championships
Gold medal – first place	2007 Beijing
Gold medal – first place	2008 Naseby
Gold medal – first place	2009 Karuizawa
Gold medal – first place	2010 Uieseong
Gold medal – first place	2011 Nanjing
Gold medal – first place	2012 Naseby
Gold medal – first place	2013 Shanghai
Gold medal – first place	2014 Karuizawa
Silver medal – second place	2016 Uiseong
Bronze medal – third place	2006 Tokyo
Bronze medal – third place	2015 Almaty
Asian Winter Games
Gold medal – first place	2017 Sapporo

Zang Jialiang (Chinese: 臧嘉亮; pinyin: Zāng Jiāliàng; born January 12, 1988, in Harbin, Heilongjiang) is a Chinese curler who trains in Harbin.

He made his world championship debut at the 2008 Grand Forks World Championships. In the round robin portion, they achieved upset wins over Team Canada and Team Norway. They finished in third after the round robin and were the first men's team from the Pacific region to qualify for the playoffs. In the 3 vs. 4 playoff match, they lost to Team Norway, and again in the bronze medal match.

Team China placed ninth overall at the 2009 Moncton World Championships, where it placed ninth overall.

Zang Jialiang represented Team China at the 2010 Winter Olympics in Vancouver, British Columbia, Canada.

== Teammates ==
2010 Vancouver Olympic Games

- Wang Fengchun, Skip
- Liu Rui, Third
- Xu Xiaoming, Second
- Li Hongchen, Alternate
