= Curling Night in America =

Television program

- Genre: Sports
- Country of origin: United States
- Original language: English
- No. of seasons: 6
- No. of episodes: 50

Original release
- Network: NBCSN; Universal Sports

Curling Night in America is an American television program broadcasting a made-for-television curling tournament called the U.S. Curling Grand Prix. The first season aired originally on Universal Sports, starting on January 22, 2015. It has since run for five additional seasons, from 2016 to 2020, on NBCSN.

== Format ==
Each season covers a made-for-television tournament, called the U.S. Curling Grand Prix, where the United States and three other countries compete for the American Cup. The Grand Prix tournament is a double round-robin tournament, with each team playing every other team in their division twice. The country with the best overall record at the end of the tournament wins the American Cup. In the first season there were two divisions, men's and women's, with one team from each country in each division. In following seasons mixed doubles was added as a third division, thus three teams from each country for a total of twelve teams across all countries and divisions. Each episode shows one game including a team from the United States, along with highlights and score updates from the other games that occurred at the same time.

== Production ==
The show is recorded in front of a live audience but broadcast at a later date. Originally the United States Curling Association published the results of the tournament in real-time but changed to keeping them secret until broadcast due to feedback. The first three seasons were filmed at curling clubs in Minnesota. The fourth season was the first to take place out of Minnesota and the first to take place out of a curling club; it was held at Baxter Arena in Omaha, Nebraska. This is the same venue that held the 2017 United States Olympic Curling Trials only a few months later. The fifth season returned to Minnesota, held at Chaska Curling Center. The sixth season was the first to take place out of the Midwest, held at an arena in Raleigh, North Carolina. In the fall of 2019 it was announced the seventh season would be filmed at the Great Park Ice arena in Irvine, California, in August 2020. The arena is also scheduled to serve as the venue for the 2021 United States Mixed Doubles Curling Olympic Trials.

All curlers competing in the televised game have microphones, allowing the audience to listen in on strategy discussions and player reactions to shots.

== Series overview ==
Season	Episodes	Originally released			Average viewership (in thousands)
Season	Episodes	First released	Last released	Network	Average viewership (in thousands)
1	6	January 22, 2015	March 13, 2015	Universal Sports	79
2	9	January 8, 2016	March 4, 2016	NBCSN	101
3	9	January 19, 2017	March 17, 2017	NBCSN	TBA
4	8	October 10, 2017	December 5, 2017	NBCSN	TBA
5	9	October 12, 2018	December 14, 2018	NBCSN	TBA
6	9	January 3, 2020	March 6, 2020	NBCSN	TBA

== Season 1 ==
The inaugural U.S. Curling Grand Prix, filmed December 4 to 6, 2014 at Fours Seasons Curling Club in Blaine, Minnesota. Was aired on Universal Sports Network and NBCSN. Commentary provided by Jason Knapp, Pete Fenson, and Tracy Wilson. At the end of the tournament China won the inaugural American Cup, finishing first in both the men's and women's divisions.

=== Teams ===
Men
Country	Skip	Third	Second	Lead	Alternate
United States	Heath McCormick	Chris Plys	Joe Polo	Ryan Brunt	Colin Hufman
China	Zang Jialiang	Zou Dejia	Ba Dexin	Zou Qiang	
Japan	Yusuke Morozumi	Tsuyoshi Yamaguchi	Tetsuro Shimizu	Kosuke Morozumi	
New Zealand	Hans Frauenlob	Dan Mustapic	Scott Becker	Warren Dobson	

Women
Country	Skip	Third	Second	Lead
United States	Nina Roth	Jamie Sinclair	Becca Hamilton	Tabitha Peterson
China	Liu Sijia	Liu Jinli	Yu Xinna	Wang Rui
Japan	Ayumi Ogasawara	Sayaka Yoshimura	Kaho Onodera	Anna Ohmiya
New Zealand	Chelsea Farley	Thivya Jeyaranjan	Tessa Farley	Eleanor Adviento

=== Episodes ===
No.	Title	Original release date
1	"USA vs China – Women"	January 22, 2015
The Chinese women defeated the United States, 5–3.
2	"New Zealand vs USA – Men"	January 30, 2015
The American men defeated New Zealand, 6–3.
3	"Japan vs USA – Women"	February 6, 2015
The American women defeated Japan, 7–4.
4	"USA vs China – Men"	February 15, 2015
The American men defeated China, 6–2. Colin Hufman played second for the United States instead of Joe Polo.
5	"USA vs New Zealand – Women"	February 27, 2015
The American women defeated New Zealand, 7–3.
6	"Japan vs USA – Men"	March 13, 2015
The Japanese men defeated the United States, 10–6. Colin Hufman played lead for the United States instead of Ryan Brunt.

== Season 2 ==
Filmed December 3 to 5, 2015 at Curl Mesabi in Eveleth, Minnesota. Commentary provided by Jason Knapp, Pete Fenson, and Tanith White. At the end of the tournament China and the United States were tied for first in the overall standings with eleven points each, with Scotland finishing third and Japan fourth. A draw to the button tiebreaker was conducted to determine the overall winner, with the men's skips from China and the United States, Zang Jialiang and John Shuster, each throwing one stone. Zang won the tiebreaker, earning the American Cup for Team China for the second consecutive year. In the individual discipline standings Scotland won in men's, United States won in mixed doubles, and China won in women's.

=== Teams ===
Men
Country	Skip	Third	Second	Lead
United States	John Shuster	Tyler George	Matt Hamilton	John Landsteiner
China	Zang Jialiang	Zou Dejia	Ba Dexin	Zou Qiang
Japan	Yusuke Morozumi	Tsuyoshi Yamaguchi	Tetsuro Shimizu	Kosuke Morozumi
Scotland	Tom Brewster	Glen Muirhead	Ross Paterson	Hammy McMillan Jr.

Women
Country	Skip	Third	Second	Lead
United States	Jamie Sinclair	Tabitha Peterson	Becca Hamilton	Jenna Haag
China	Mei Jie	Yu Xinna	Liu Jinli	Wang Rui
Japan	Satsuki Fujisawa	Chinami Yoshida	Yumi Suzuki	Yurika Yoshida
Scotland	Hannah Fleming	Sophie Jackson	Laura Ritchie	Karina Aitken

Mixed doubles
Country	Female	Male
United States	Sarah Anderson	Korey Dropkin
China	Gao Xuesong	Ma Xiuyue
Japan	Michiko Tomabechi	Kenji Tomabechi
Scotland	Jennifer Dodds	Alasdair Schreiber

=== Episodes ===
No.	Title	Original release date
1	"USA vs Japan – Men"	January 8, 2016
The American men tied Japan, 5–5, and then won the draw to the button tiebreaker.
2	"USA vs Japan – Mixed doubles"	January 15, 2016
The American team defeated Japan, 11–4.
3	"USA vs China – Women"	January 29, 2016
The American women tied China 5–5 in regulation, then won the draw to the button tiebreaker.
4	"USA vs Scotland – Men"	February 5, 2016
The American men defeated Scotland, 5–4.
5	"USA vs China – Mixed doubles"	February 5, 2016
The American team defeated China.
6	"USA vs Japan – Women"	February 12, 2016
The Japanese women defeated the United States, 5–3.
7	"USA vs China – Men"	February 19, 2016
The Chinese men defeated United States, 5–3.
8	"USA vs Scotland – Mixed doubles"	February 26, 2016
The American team defeated Scotland, 10–2.
9	"USA vs Scotland – Women"	March 4, 2016
The American women defeated Scotland, 7–1.

== Season 3 ==
Filmed December 1 to 3, 2016 at Duluth Curling Club in Duluth, Minnesota. Jason Knapp, Pete Fenson, and Tanith White provided commentary. The United States won the overall tournament, earning the American Cup for the first time.

=== Teams ===
Men
Country	Skip	Third	Second	Lead
United States	John Shuster	Tyler George	Matt Hamilton	John Landsteiner
China	Liu Rui	Xu Xiaoming	Ba Dexin	Zang Jialiang
Japan	Yusuke Morozumi	Tetsuro Shimizu	Tsuyoshi Yamaguchi	Kosuke Morozumi
Scotland	Ally Fraser	Ruairidh Greenwood	Calum Greenwood	Angus Dowell

Women
Country	Skip	Third	Second	Lead
United States	Nina Roth	Tabitha Peterson	Aileen Geving	Becca Hamilton
China	Wang Bingyu	Zhou Yan	Liu Jinli	Yang Ying
Japan	Junko Nishimuro (fourth)	Tori Koana (skip)	Yuna Kotani	Mao Ishigaki
Scotland	Sarah Reid (fourth)	Claire Hamilton	Katie Murray	Hazel Smith (skip)

Mixed doubles
Country	Female	Male
United States	Tabitha Peterson	Joe Polo
China	Wang Rui	Ba Dexin
Japan	Eri Araki	Takuma Makanae
Scotland	Judith McCleary	Lee McCleary

=== Episodes ===
No.	Title	Original release date
1	"USA vs China – Men"	January 19, 2017
The Chinese men defeated the United States, 9–6.
2	"USA vs China – Mixed doubles"	January 27, 2017
The Chinese team defeated the United States, 10–4.
3	"USA vs Japan – Women"	February 3, 2017
The Japanese women defeated the United States, 6–3.
4	"USA vs Scotland – Women"	February 10, 2017
The American women defeated Scotland, 7–3.
5	"USA vs Japan – Mixed doubles"	February 17, 2017
The Japanese team defeated the United States, 7–4.
6	"USA vs Japan – Men"	February 24, 2017
The American men defeated Japan, 7–4.
7	"USA vs China – Women"	March 2, 2017
The American women defeated China, 8–1.
8	"USA vs Scotland – Mixed doubles"	March 11, 2017
The American team defeated Scotland, 9–3.
9	"USA vs Scotland – Men"	March 17, 2017
The Scottish men tied the United States 6–6, but then won the draw to the button tiebreaker.

== Season 4 ==
Filmed August 24 to 26, 2017 at Baxter Arena in Omaha, Nebraska; a precursor to the arena holding the Olympic trials. Commentary provided by Jason Knapp, Pete Fenson, and Trenni Kusnierek. The United States won the overall tournament for the second year in a row. In the individual discipline standings Japan won the men's with a draw to the button tiebreaker over the United States, the United States won the women's with a tiebreaker over China, and the United States won in mixed doubles.

=== Teams ===
Men
Country	Skip	Third	Second	Lead
United States	Heath McCormick	Chris Plys	Korey Dropkin	Thomas Howell
China	Zou Dejia	Zou Qiang	Xu Jingtao	Shao Zhilin
Japan	Yusuke Morozumi	Tetsuro Shimizu	Tsuyoshi Yamaguchi	Kosuke Morozumi
Scotland	Cameron Bryce	Ross Whyte	Robin Brydone	Euan Kyle

Women
Country	Skip	Third	Second	Lead
United States	Jamie Sinclair	Alex Carlson	Vicky Persinger	Monica Walker
China	Jiang Yilun	Jiang Xindi	Yao Mingyue	Yan Hui
Japan	Junko Nishimuro (fourth)	Tori Koana (skip)	Yuna Kotani	Mao Ishigaki
Scotland	Sophie Jackson	Naomi Brown	Mili Smith	Sophie Sinclair

Mixed doubles
Country	Female	Male
United States	Becca Hamilton	Matt Hamilton
China	Mei Jie	Shao Zhilin
Japan	Michiko Tomabechi	Kenji Tomabechi
Scotland	Laura Barr	Gavin Barr

=== Episodes ===
No.	Title	Original release date
1	"USA vs Scotland – Men"	October 10, 2017
The Scottish men tied the United States 5–5, but then won the draw to the button tiebreaker.
2	"USA vs Scotland – Women"	October 17, 2017
The Scottish women tied the United States 3–3, but then won the draw to the button tiebreaker.
3	"USA vs China – Men"	October 24, 2017
The American men defeated China, 7–3.
4	"USA vs Japan – Women"	October 31, 2017
The American women tied Japan 6–6, but then won the draw to the button tiebreaker.
5	"USA vs Japan – Men"	November 7, 2017
The American men defeated Japan, 6–3.
6	"USA vs China – Women, USA vs China – Mixed doubles"	November 21, 2017
The American mixed doubles team defeated China 6–5 and the Chinese women defeated the United States 5–3.
7	"USA vs Japan – Mixed doubles"	November 28, 2017
The American team defeated Japan, 8–5.
8	"USA vs Scotland – Mixed doubles"	December 5, 2017
The American team defeated Scotland, 9–2.

== Season 5 ==
Filmed August 27 to 29, 2018 at Chaska Curling Center in Chaska, Minnesota. Commentary provided by Jason Knapp, Pete Fenson, and Tanith White. United States represented by three out of five men's Olympic team members, four out of five women's Olympic team members, and the Olympic mixed doubles team of the Hamilton siblings. The United States won the American Cup for a third year in a row, only losing one game across the overall tournament.

=== Teams ===
Men
Country	Skip	Third	Second	Lead	Alternate
United States	John Shuster	Chris Plys	Matt Hamilton	John Landsteiner	Kroy Nernberger
China	Zou Qiang	Zhang Zhipeng	Xu Jingtao	Shao Zhilin	
Japan	Go Aoki (fourth)	Masaki Iwai (skip)	Ryotaro Shukuya	Kouki Ogiwara	
Italy	Amos Mosaner (fourth)	Joël Retornaz (skip)	Sebastiano Arman	Alberto Pimpini	

Women
Country	Skip	Third	Second	Lead	Alternate
United States	Nina Roth	Tabitha Peterson	Becca Hamilton	Aileen Geving	Tara Peterson
China	Wang Rui (fourth)	Mei Jie (skip)	Yao Mingyue	Ma Jingyi	
Japan	Tori Koana	Yuna Kotani	Mao Ishigaki	Arisa Kotani	
Italy	Stefania Constantini	Angela Romei	Valeria Girardi	Federica Ghedina	

Mixed doubles
Country	Female	Male
United States	Becca Hamilton	Matt Hamilton
China	Yang Ying	Jiang Dongxu
Japan	Ikue Kitazawa	Kohsuke Hirata
Italy	Veronica Zappone	Simone Gonin

=== Episodes ===
No.	Title	Original release date
1	"USA vs Italy – Men"	October 12, 2018
The American men defeated Italy, 8–3.
2	"USA vs China – Mixed doubles"	October 19, 2018
The American team defeated China, 7–4.
3	"USA vs China – Women"	October 26, 2018
The American women defeated China, 7–6.
4	"USA vs Japan – Women"	November 2, 2018
The American women defeated Japan, 9–2.
5	"USA vs Italy – Mixed doubles"	November 9, 2018
The Italian team defeated the United States, 5–4.
6	"USA vs Japan – Men"	November 23, 2018
The American men defeated Japan, 9–2.
7	"USA vs Italy – Women"	November 30, 2018
The American women defeated Italy, 10–1.
8	"USA vs Japan – Mixed doubles"	December 14, 2018
The American team defeated Japan, 10–5.
9	"USA vs China – Men"	December 14, 2018
The American men defeated China, 5–3.

== Season 6 ==
Filmed August 22 to 24, 2019 at Polar Iceplex in Raleigh, North Carolina. Commentary provided by Jason Knapp, Pete Fenson, and Tanith White. The United States won their fourth American Cup in a row, with Italy finishing second overall, Japan third, and Scotland fourth.

=== Teams ===
Men
Country	Skip	Third	Second	Lead
United States	John Shuster	Chris Plys	Matt Hamilton	John Landsteiner
Scotland	Luke Carlson	Stuart Taylor	Mark Taylor	Alasdair Schreiber
Japan	Yuta Matsumura	Tetsuro Shimizu	Yasumasa Tanida	Shinya Abe
Italy	Joël Retornaz	Amos Mosaner	Sebastiano Arman	Simone Gonin

Women
Country	Skip	Third	Second	Lead
United States	Jamie Sinclair	Cory Christensen	Vicky Persinger	Taylor Anderson
Scotland	Rebecca Morrison	Maggie Wilson	Jennifer Marshall	Eilidh Yeats
Japan	Satsuki Fujisawa	Chinami Yoshida	Yumi Suzuki	Yurika Yoshida
Italy	Veronica Zappone	Stefania Constantini	Angela Romei	Federica Ghedina

Mixed doubles
Country	Female	Male
United States	Sarah Anderson	Korey Dropkin
Scotland	Amy MacDonald	Robin Brydone
Japan	Shiori Fujisawa	Kota Onodera
Italy	Stefania Constantini	Amos Mosaner

=== Episodes ===
No.	Title	Original release date
1	"USA vs Scotland – Men"	January 3, 2020
The American men defeated Scotland, 10–4.
2	"USA vs Japan – Mixed doubles"	January 10, 2020
The American team defeated Japan, 10–5.
3	"USA vs Scotland – Women"	January 17, 2020
The American women defeated Scotland, 7–2.
4	"USA vs Italy – Women"	January 31, 2020
The American women defeated Scotland, 7–6.
5	"USA vs Italy – Mixed doubles"	February 14, 2020
The American team defeated Italy, 6–3.
6	"USA vs Japan – Men"	February 21, 2020
The American men defeated Japan, 7–6.
7	"USA vs Japan – Women"	February 21, 2020
The American women defeated Scotland, 6–4.
8	"USA vs Scotland – Mixed doubles"	February 28, 2020
The American team defeated Scotland, 8–5.
9	"USA vs Italy – Men"	March 6, 2020
The American men tied Italy 4–4, but then won the draw to the button tiebreaker.

== Season 7 ==
To be filmed August 25 to 27, 2021 at the Great Park Ice Arena in Irvine, California.

=== Teams ===
Men
Country	Skip	Third	Second	Lead	Alternate
United States	John Shuster	Chris Plys	Matt Hamilton	John Landsteiner	Colin Hufman
Canada	Tyler Tardi	Alex Horvath	Sterling Middleton	Jason Ginter	
Germany	Felix Messenzehl	Benjamin Kapp	Magnus Sutor	Johannes Scheuerl	
Denmark	Tobias Thune	Kasper Wiksten	Daniel Poulsen	Oliver Rosenkrands Søe	

Women
Country	Skip	Third	Second	Lead	Alternate
United States	Tabitha Peterson	Nina Roth	Tara Peterson	Becca Hamilton	Aileen Geving
Canada	Kaitlyn Lawes	Jocelyn Peterman	Selena Njegovan	Lisa Weagle	
Germany	Daniela Jentsch	Emira Abbes	Mia Höhne	Analena Jentsch	
Denmark	Madeleine Dupont	Denise Dupont	Mathilde Halse	My Larsen	

Mixed doubles
Country	Female	Male
United States	Vicky Persinger	Chris Plys
Canada	Bobbie Sauder	Brendan Bottcher
Germany	Lena Kapp	Klaudius Harsch
Denmark	Jasmin Lander	Henrik Holtermann
