= 2021 Masters (curling) =

Grand Slam of Curling event

- Host city: Oakville, Ontario
- Arena: Sixteen Mile Sports Complex
- Dates: October 19–24
- Men's winner: (Scotland) Team Mouat
- Curling club: Gogar Park CC, Edinburgh
- Skip: Bruce Mouat
- Third: Grant Hardie
- Second: Bobby Lammie
- Lead: Hammy McMillan Jr.
- Coach: David Murdoch
- Finalist: (Ontario) Brad Jacobs
- Women's winner: (Manitoba) Team Fleury
- Curling club: East St. Paul CC, East St. Paul
- Skip: Tracy Fleury
- Third: Selena Njegovan
- Second: Liz Fyfe
- Lead: Kristin MacCuish
- Coach: Chelsea Carey, Sherry Middaugh
- Finalist: (Manitoba) Jennifer Jones

The 2021 Masters was held October 19 to 24 at the Sixteen Mile Sports Complex in Oakville, Ontario. It was the first Grand Slam and first major of the 2021–22 season.

== Qualification ==
The top 16 ranked men's and women's teams on the World Curling Federation's world team rankings qualified for the event. In the event that a team declines their invitation, the next-ranked team on the world team ranking is invited until the field is complete.

=== Men ===
Top world team ranking men's teams:

1. (Ontario) Brad Jacobs
2. (Ontario) John Epping
3. (Newfoundland and Labrador) Brad Gushue
4. (Alberta) Brendan Bottcher
5. (Scotland) Bruce Mouat
6. (Switzerland) Yannick Schwaller
7. (Manitoba) Mike McEwen
8. (Sweden) Niklas Edin
9. (Switzerland) Peter de Cruz
10. (Alberta) Kevin Koe
11. (Saskatchewan) Matt Dunstone
12. (Scotland) Ross Paterson
13. (Manitoba) Jason Gunnlaugson
14. (United States) ~~Korey Dropkin~~
15. (United States) Rich Ruohonen
16. (Japan) Yuta Matsumura
17. (Scotland) Ross Whyte

=== Women ===
Top world team ranking women's teams:

1. (Sweden) Anna Hasselborg
2. (Manitoba) Kerri Einarson
3. (Manitoba) Tracy Fleury
4. (Japan) Satsuki Fujisawa
5. (Manitoba) Jennifer Jones
6. (Switzerland) ~~Elena Stern~~
7. (Switzerland) Silvana Tirinzoni
8. (Ontario) Rachel Homan
9. (Scotland) ~~Eve Muirhead~~
10. (United States) Tabitha Peterson
11. (South Korea) Kim Min-ji
12. (Russia) Alina Kovaleva
13. (South Korea) Kim Eun-jung
14. (Japan) Sayaka Yoshimura
15. (South Korea) Gim Un-chi
16. (Alberta) Kelsey Rocque
17. (Sweden) Isabella Wranå
18. (Japan) Tori Koana

== Men ==
=== Teams ===
The teams are listed as follows:

Skip	Third	Second	Lead	Alternate	Locale
Brendan Bottcher	Darren Moulding	Brad Thiessen	Karrick Martin		Edmonton, Alberta
Benoît Schwarz (Fourth)	Sven Michel	Peter de Cruz (Skip)	Valentin Tanner		Geneva, Switzerland
Matt Dunstone	Braeden Moskowy	Kirk Muyres	Dustin Kidby		Regina, Saskatchewan
Niklas Edin	Oskar Eriksson	Rasmus Wranå	Christoffer Sundgren		Karlstad, Sweden
John Epping	Ryan Fry	Mat Camm	Brent Laing		Toronto, Ontario
Jason Gunnlaugson	Adam Casey	Matt Wozniak	Connor Njegovan		Morris, Manitoba
Brad Gushue	Mark Nichols	Brett Gallant	Geoff Walker		St. John's, Newfoundland and Labrador
Brad Jacobs	Marc Kennedy	E. J. Harnden	Ryan Harnden		Sault Ste. Marie, Ontario
Kevin Koe	B. J. Neufeld	John Morris	Ben Hebert		Calgary, Alberta
Yuta Matsumura	Tetsuro Shimizu	Yasumasa Tanida	Shinya Abe	Kosuke Hirata	Kitami, Japan
Mike McEwen	Reid Carruthers	Derek Samagalski	Colin Hodgson		West St. Paul, Manitoba
Bruce Mouat	Grant Hardie	Bobby Lammie	Hammy McMillan Jr.		Stirling, Scotland
Ross Paterson	Kyle Waddell	Duncan Menzies	Craig Waddell		Glasgow, Scotland
Rich Ruohonen	Andrew Stopera	Colin Hufman	Kroy Nernberger	Phil Tilker	(United States) Minneapolis, Minnesota
Yannick Schwaller	Michael Brunner	Romano Meier	Marcel Käufeler		Bern, Switzerland
Ross Whyte	Robin Brydone	Duncan McFadzean	Euan Kyle		Stirling, Scotland

=== Knockout brackets ===
==== A event ====
A Event	Qualifier 1
1	(Scotland) Bruce Mouat	7
1	(United States) Rich Ruohonen	3	9	(Scotland) Bruce Mouat	5
2	(Switzerland) Peter de Cruz	3	9	(Saskatchewan) Matt Dunstone	1
2	(Saskatchewan) Matt Dunstone	7	13	(Scotland) Bruce Mouat	7
3	(Alberta) Brendan Bottcher	6	13	(Alberta) Brendan Bottcher	4
3	(Scotland) Ross Paterson	2	10	(Alberta) Brendan Bottcher	7
4	(Sweden) Niklas Edin	5	10	(Manitoba) Jason Gunnlaugson	2
4	(Manitoba) Jason Gunnlaugson	7

A Event	Qualifier 2
5	(Newfoundland and Labrador) Brad Gushue	6
5	(Scotland) Ross Whyte	5	11	(Newfoundland and Labrador) Brad Gushue	7
6	(Ontario) John Epping	4	11	(Ontario) John Epping	2
6	(Switzerland) Yannick Schwaller	2	14	(Newfoundland and Labrador) Brad Gushue	6
7	(Ontario) Brad Jacobs	5	14	(Alberta) Kevin Koe	2
7	(Japan) Yuta Matsumura	3	12	(Ontario) Brad Jacobs	4
8	(Alberta) Kevin Koe	7	12	(Alberta) Kevin Koe	5
8	(Manitoba) Mike McEwen	6

==== B event ====
B Event						Qualifier 3
15	(United States) Rich Ruohonen	5
15	(Switzerland) Peter de Cruz	4	19	(United States) Rich Ruohonen	2
16	(Scotland) Ross Paterson	5	19	(Sweden) Niklas Edin	9
16	(Sweden) Niklas Edin	8				23	(Sweden) Niklas Edin	6
						23	(Alberta) Kevin Koe	4

B Event						Qualifier 4
17	(Scotland) Ross Whyte	8
17	(Switzerland) Yannick Schwaller	6	20	(Scotland) Ross Whyte	6
18	(Japan) Yuta Matsumura	8	20	(Japan) Yuta Matsumura	3
18	(Manitoba) Mike McEwen	2				24	(Scotland) Ross Whyte	4
						24	(Alberta) Brendan Bottcher	6

B Event			Qualifier 5
21	(Saskatchewan) Matt Dunstone	5
21	(Manitoba) Jason Gunnlaugson	6	25	(Manitoba) Jason Gunnlaugson	4
22	(Ontario) John Epping	4	25	(Ontario) Brad Jacobs	5
22	(Ontario) Brad Jacobs	6

==== C event ====
C Event						Qualifier 6
26	(Switzerland) Peter de Cruz	7
26	(Scotland) Ross Paterson	2	28	(Switzerland) Peter de Cruz	8
			28	(Saskatchewan) Matt Dunstone	6
						31	(Switzerland) Peter de Cruz	4
						31	(Scotland) Ross Whyte	5

C Event						Qualifier 7
27	(Switzerland) Yannick Schwaller	2
27	(Manitoba) Mike McEwen	3	29	(Manitoba) Mike McEwen	3
			29	(Ontario) John Epping	1
						32	(Manitoba) Mike McEwen	2
						32	(Alberta) Kevin Koe	6

C Event			Qualifier 8
30	(United States) Rich Ruohonen	8
30	(Japan) Yuta Matsumura	11	33	(Japan) Yuta Matsumura	5
			33	(Manitoba) Jason Gunnlaugson	2

=== Knockout results ===
All draw times are listed in Eastern Time (UTC−04:00).

==== Draw 3 ====
Tuesday, October 19, 3:00 pm

Sheet A	1	2	3	4	5	6	7	8	Final
(Scotland) Bruce Mouat 🔨	0	1	0	2	1	0	1	2	7
(United States) Rich Ruohonen	0	0	2	0	0	1	0	0	3

Sheet B	1	2	3	4	5	6	7	8	Final
(Alberta) Brendan Bottcher	0	2	0	1	0	1	1	1	6
(Scotland) Ross Paterson 🔨	2	0	0	0	0	0	0	0	2

Sheet C	1	2	3	4	5	6	7	8	Final
(Newfoundland and Labrador) Brad Gushue 🔨	1	0	2	0	0	1	0	2	6
(Scotland) Ross Whyte	0	2	0	2	0	0	1	0	5

Sheet D	1	2	3	4	5	6	7	8	Final
(Ontario) John Epping 🔨	0	1	1	0	0	0	1	1	4
(Switzerland) Yannick Schwaller	0	0	0	1	1	0	0	0	2

==== Draw 4 ====
Tuesday, October 19, 6:30 pm

Sheet A	1	2	3	4	5	6	7	8	Final
(Switzerland) Peter de Cruz	0	0	0	1	0	2	0	X	3
(Saskatchewan) Matt Dunstone 🔨	0	0	2	0	3	0	2	X	7

Sheet B	1	2	3	4	5	6	7	8	Final
(Sweden) Niklas Edin 🔨	1	0	0	2	0	0	2	0	5
(Manitoba) Jason Gunnlaugson	0	2	1	0	1	1	0	2	7

Sheet C	1	2	3	4	5	6	7	8	Final
(Ontario) Brad Jacobs 🔨	1	0	2	0	0	2	0	X	5
(Japan) Yuta Matsumura	0	2	0	0	1	0	0	X	3

Sheet D	1	2	3	4	5	6	7	8	9	Final
(Alberta) Kevin Koe 🔨	0	2	0	2	0	1	1	0	1	7
(Manitoba) Mike McEwen	1	0	2	0	1	0	0	2	0	6

==== Draw 7 ====
Wednesday, October 20, 4:00 pm

Sheet A	1	2	3	4	5	6	7	8	Final
(Japan) Yuta Matsumura	2	3	2	0	1	X	X	X	8
(Manitoba) Mike McEwen 🔨	0	0	0	2	0	X	X	X	2

Sheet B	1	2	3	4	5	6	7	8	Final
(Ontario) Brad Jacobs 🔨	0	1	0	1	1	0	1	0	4
(Alberta) Kevin Koe	1	0	1	0	0	1	0	2	5

Sheet C	1	2	3	4	5	6	7	8	Final
(Scotland) Ross Paterson	0	1	0	2	0	0	2	0	5
(Sweden) Niklas Edin 🔨	2	0	1	0	3	1	0	1	8

Sheet D	1	2	3	4	5	6	7	8	Final
(Alberta) Brendan Bottcher	0	0	5	1	0	1	X	X	7
(Manitoba) Jason Gunnlaugson 🔨	0	1	0	0	1	0	X	X	2

==== Draw 8 ====
Wednesday, October 20, 8:00 pm

Sheet A	1	2	3	4	5	6	7	8	Final
(Scotland) Ross Whyte	0	2	0	2	1	0	0	3	8
(Switzerland) Yannick Schwaller 🔨	1	0	3	0	0	1	1	0	6

Sheet B	1	2	3	4	5	6	7	8	Final
(Newfoundland and Labrador) Brad Gushue 🔨	2	2	0	0	3	X	X	X	7
(Ontario) John Epping	0	0	2	0	0	X	X	X	2

Sheet C	1	2	3	4	5	6	7	8	Final
(United States) Rich Ruohonen	0	1	1	0	0	0	2	0	4
(Switzerland) Peter de Cruz 🔨	0	0	0	2	0	0	0	2	4

Sheet D	1	2	3	4	5	6	7	8	Final
(Scotland) Bruce Mouat 🔨	2	1	2	0	0	X	X	X	5
(Saskatchewan) Matt Dunstone	0	0	0	1	0	X	X	X	1

==== Draw 10 ====
Thursday, October 21, 11:00 am

Sheet A	1	2	3	4	5	6	7	8	Final
(Ontario) John Epping 🔨	2	0	0	0	0	2	0	X	4
(Ontario) Brad Jacobs	0	0	2	1	1	0	2	X	6

Sheet B	1	2	3	4	5	6	7	8	Final
(Scotland) Ross Whyte	0	4	0	0	0	2	0	X	6
(Japan) Yuta Matsumura 🔨	1	0	0	1	0	0	1	X	3

Sheet C	1	2	3	4	5	6	7	8	9	Final
(Saskatchewan) Matt Dunstone	0	1	0	0	1	0	0	3	0	5
(Manitoba) Jason Gunnlaugson 🔨	1	0	1	1	0	1	1	0	1	6

Sheet D	1	2	3	4	5	6	7	8	Final
(United States) Rich Ruohonen 🔨	0	1	0	0	1	X	X	X	2
(Sweden) Niklas Edin	0	0	4	5	0	X	X	X	9

==== Draw 12 ====
Thursday, October 21, 7:00 pm

Sheet A	1	2	3	4	5	6	7	8	Final
(Newfoundland and Labrador) Brad Gushue 🔨	2	0	1	0	0	2	1	X	6
(Alberta) Kevin Koe	0	1	0	1	0	0	0	X	2

Sheet B	1	2	3	4	5	6	7	8	Final
(Switzerland) Yannick Schwaller 🔨	1	0	0	0	0	0	1	0	2
(Manitoba) Mike McEwen	0	0	0	0	0	2	0	1	3

Sheet C	1	2	3	4	5	6	7	8	Final
(Scotland) Bruce Mouat	0	1	1	0	4	0	1	X	7
(Alberta) Brendan Bottcher 🔨	2	0	0	1	0	1	0	X	4

Sheet D	1	2	3	4	5	6	7	8	Final
(Switzerland) Peter de Cruz 🔨	0	2	0	2	0	1	2	X	7
(Scotland) Ross Paterson	0	0	2	0	0	0	0	X	2

==== Draw 13 ====
Friday, October 22, 7:30 am

Sheet B	1	2	3	4	5	6	7	8	Final
(Switzerland) Peter de Cruz 🔨	2	0	2	2	0	1	0	1	8
(Saskatchewan) Matt Dunstone	0	3	0	0	1	0	2	0	6

Sheet C	1	2	3	4	5	6	7	8	Final
(Manitoba) Mike McEwen 🔨	0	0	2	0	0	1	0	X	3
(Ontario) John Epping	0	0	0	0	0	0	1	X	1

==== Draw 14 ====
Friday, October 22, 11:00 am

Sheet A	1	2	3	4	5	6	7	8	Final
(Sweden) Niklas Edin	0	1	0	1	1	0	3	0	6
(Alberta) Kevin Koe 🔨	2	0	1	0	0	1	0	0	4

Sheet B	1	2	3	4	5	6	7	8	Final
(Manitoba) Jason Gunnlaugson 🔨	1	0	1	0	0	0	2	0	4
(Ontario) Brad Jacobs	0	2	0	1	1	0	0	1	5

Sheet C	1	2	3	4	5	6	7	8	Final
(United States) Rich Ruohonen 🔨	2	0	2	0	3	0	1	0	8
(Japan) Yuta Matsumura	0	2	0	3	0	2	0	4	11

Sheet D	1	2	3	4	5	6	7	8	Final
(Scotland) Ross Whyte 🔨	1	0	1	1	0	0	1	0	4
(Alberta) Brendan Bottcher	0	2	0	0	2	1	0	1	6

==== Draw 16 ====
Friday, October 22, 7:00 pm

Sheet B	1	2	3	4	5	6	7	8	Final
(Japan) Yuta Matsumura 🔨	1	0	0	2	0	1	1	X	5
(Manitoba) Jason Gunnlaugson	0	0	1	0	1	0	0	X	2

Sheet C	1	2	3	4	5	6	7	8	9	Final
(Switzerland) Peter de Cruz	0	1	0	0	1	0	1	1	0	4
(Scotland) Ross Whyte 🔨	1	0	2	0	0	1	0	0	1	5

Sheet D	1	2	3	4	5	6	7	8	Final
(Manitoba) Mike McEwen	0	1	0	0	1	X	X	X	2
(Alberta) Kevin Koe 🔨	4	0	0	2	0	X	X	X	6

=== Playoffs ===
Quarterfinals
A1	(Scotland) Bruce Mouat	4
C1	(Scotland) Ross Whyte	2
B2	(Alberta) Brendan Bottcher	5
B1	(Sweden) Niklas Edin	3
A2	(Newfoundland and Labrador) Brad Gushue	6
C3	(Japan) Yuta Matsumura	2
B3	(Ontario) Brad Jacobs	5
C2	(Alberta) Kevin Koe	4

Semifinals
A1	(Scotland) Bruce Mouat	6
B2	(Alberta) Brendan Bottcher	4
A2	(Newfoundland and Labrador) Brad Gushue	4
B3	(Ontario) Brad Jacobs	9

Final
A1	(Scotland) Bruce Mouat	7
B3	(Ontario) Brad Jacobs	5

==== Quarterfinals ====
Saturday, October 23, 12:00 pm

Sheet A	1	2	3	4	5	6	7	8	Final
(Alberta) Brendan Bottcher	1	0	0	2	0	1	0	1	5
(Sweden) Niklas Edin 🔨	0	0	2	0	0	0	1	0	3

Player percentages
(Alberta) Team Bottcher		(Sweden) Team Edin	
Karrick Martin	86%	Christoffer Sundgren	100%
Brad Thiessen	66%	Rasmus Wranå	77%
Darren Moulding	78%	Oskar Eriksson	75%
Brendan Bottcher	83%	Niklas Edin	78%
Total	78%	Total	83%

Sheet B	1	2	3	4	5	6	7	8	Final
(Scotland) Bruce Mouat 🔨	1	0	1	1	0	0	1	X	4
(Scotland) Ross Whyte	0	1	0	0	0	1	0	X	2

Player percentages
(Scotland) Team Mouat		(Scotland) Team Whyte	
Hammy McMillan Jr.	92%	Euan Kyle	92%
Bobby Lammie	91%	Duncan McFadzean	66%
Grant Hardie	95%	Robin Brydone	69%
Bruce Mouat	91%	Ross Whyte	80%
Total	92%	Total	77%

Sheet C	1	2	3	4	5	6	7	8	9	Final
(Ontario) Brad Jacobs 🔨	0	2	0	1	0	1	0	0	1	5
(Alberta) Kevin Koe	0	0	2	0	0	0	1	1	0	4

Player percentages
(Ontario) Team Jacobs		(Alberta) Team Koe	
Ryan Harnden	90%	Ben Hebert	97%
E. J. Harnden	91%	John Morris	100%
Marc Kennedy	93%	B. J. Neufeld	93%
Brad Jacobs	82%	Kevin Koe	81%
Total	89%	Total	93%

Sheet D	1	2	3	4	5	6	7	8	Final
(Newfoundland and Labrador) Brad Gushue 🔨	2	0	0	2	0	2	0	X	6
(Japan) Yuta Matsumura	0	1	0	0	1	0	0	X	2

Player percentages
(Newfoundland and Labrador) Team Gushue		(Japan) Team Matsumura	
Geoff Walker	95%	Shinya Abe	88%
Brett Gallant	83%	Yasumasa Tanida	66%
Mark Nichols	77%	Tetsuro Shimizu	88%
Brad Gushue	96%	Yuta Matsumura	61%
Total	87%	Total	76%

==== Semifinals ====
Saturday, October 23, 8:00 pm

Sheet A	1	2	3	4	5	6	7	8	Final
(Newfoundland and Labrador) Brad Gushue 🔨	1	0	2	0	1	0	X	X	4
(Ontario) Brad Jacobs	0	2	0	4	0	3	X	X	9

Player percentages
(Newfoundland and Labrador) Team Gushue		(Ontario) Team Jacobs	
Geoff Walker	81%	Ryan Harnden	88%
Brett Gallant	69%	E. J. Harnden	75%
Mark Nichols	71%	Marc Kennedy	73%
Brad Gushue	58%	Brad Jacobs	90%
Total	70%	Total	81%

Sheet C	1	2	3	4	5	6	7	8	Final
(Scotland) Bruce Mouat 🔨	0	2	0	2	0	1	0	1	6
(Alberta) Brendan Bottcher	0	0	1	0	2	0	1	0	4

Player percentages
(Scotland) Team Mouat		(Alberta) Team Bottcher	
Hammy McMillan Jr.	73%	Karrick Martin	83%
Bobby Lammie	77%	Brad Thiessen	91%
Grant Hardie	81%	Darren Moulding	72%
Bruce Mouat	91%	Brendan Bottcher	88%
Total	80%	Total	83%

==== Final ====
Sunday, October 24, 4:00 pm

Sheet B	1	2	3	4	5	6	7	8	Final
(Scotland) Bruce Mouat 🔨	1	0	2	0	0	1	0	3	7
(Ontario) Brad Jacobs	0	2	0	0	2	0	1	0	5

Player percentages
(Scotland) Team Mouat		(Ontario) Team Jacobs	
Hammy McMillan Jr.	86%	Ryan Harnden	89%
Bobby Lammie	89%	E. J. Harnden	67%
Grant Hardie	84%	Marc Kennedy	67%
Bruce Mouat	78%	Brad Jacobs	73%
Total	84%	Total	74%

== Women ==
=== Teams ===
The teams are listed as follows:

Skip	Third	Second	Lead	Alternate	Locale
Kerri Einarson	Val Sweeting	Shannon Birchard	Briane Meilleur		Gimli, Manitoba
Tracy Fleury	Selena Njegovan	Liz Fyfe	Kristin MacCuish		East St. Paul, Manitoba
Satsuki Fujisawa	Chinami Yoshida	Yumi Suzuki	Yurika Yoshida		Kitami, Japan
Gim Un-chi	Seol Ye-ji	Kim Su-ji	Seol Ye-eun	Park You-been	Uijeongbu, South Korea
Anna Hasselborg	Sara McManus	Agnes Knochenhauer	Sofia Mabergs		Sundbyberg, Sweden
Rachel Homan	Emma Miskew	Sarah Wilkes	Joanne Courtney		Ottawa, Ontario
Jennifer Jones	Kaitlyn Lawes	Jocelyn Peterman	Dawn McEwen	Lisa Weagle	Winnipeg, Manitoba
Kim Eun-jung	Kim Kyeong-ae	Kim Cho-hi	Kim Seon-yeong	Kim Yeong-mi	Gangneung, South Korea
Kim Hye-rin (Note: As regular skip Kim Min-ji was in Europe competing on the mixed doubles tour, third Kim Hye-rin moved up to play skip and second Ha Seung-youn moved up to play third. Alternate Yang Tae-i moved into the second position.)	Ha Seung-youn	Yang Tae-i	Kim Su-jin		Chuncheon, South Korea
Tori Koana	Yuna Kotani	Mao Ishigaki	Arisa Kotani		Fujiyoshida, Japan
Alina Kovaleva	Yulia Portunova	Galina Arsenkina	Ekaterina Kuzmina		Saint Petersburg, Russia
Tabitha Peterson	Nina Roth	Becca Hamilton	Tara Peterson	Aileen Geving	(United States) Chaska, Minnesota
Kelsey Rocque	Danielle Schmiemann	Dana Ferguson	Rachelle Brown		Edmonton, Alberta
Alina Pätz (Fourth)	Silvana Tirinzoni (Skip)	Esther Neuenschwander	Melanie Barbezat		Aarau, Switzerland
Isabella Wranå	Almida de Val	Jennie Wåhlin	Maria Larsson		Sundbyberg, Sweden
Sayaka Yoshimura	Kaho Onodera	Anna Ohmiya	Yumie Funayama		Sapporo, Japan

=== Knockout brackets ===
==== A event ====
A Event	Qualifier 1
1	(Sweden) Anna Hasselborg	6
1	(Japan) Tori Koana	7	9	(Japan) Tori Koana	3
2	(Manitoba) Jennifer Jones	5	9	(United States) Tabitha Peterson	5
2	(United States) Tabitha Peterson	6	13	(United States) Tabitha Peterson	5
3	(Ontario) Rachel Homan	6	13	(Ontario) Rachel Homan	7
3	(Alberta) Kelsey Rocque	5	10	(Ontario) Rachel Homan	6
4	(Manitoba) Tracy Fleury	6	10	(Manitoba) Tracy Fleury	5
4	(Japan) Sayaka Yoshimura	2

A Event	Qualifier 2
5	(Manitoba) Kerri Einarson	6
5	(Sweden) Isabella Wranå	5	11	(Manitoba) Kerri Einarson	3
6	(Russia) Alina Kovaleva	3	11	(South Korea) Kim Eun-jung	5
6	(South Korea) Kim Eun-jung	4	14	(South Korea) Kim Eun-jung	5
7	(Switzerland) Silvana Tirinzoni	6	14	(Switzerland) Silvana Tirinzoni	8
7	(South Korea) Gim Un-chi	3	12	(Switzerland) Silvana Tirinzoni	8
8	(Japan) Satsuki Fujisawa	5	12	(Japan) Satsuki Fujisawa	7
8	(South Korea) Team M. Kim	3

==== B event ====
B Event						Qualifier 3
15	(Sweden) Anna Hasselborg	7
15	(Manitoba) Jennifer Jones	5	19	(Sweden) Anna Hasselborg	6
16	(Alberta) Kelsey Rocque	6	19	(Alberta) Kelsey Rocque	5
16	(Japan) Sayaka Yoshimura	5				23	(Sweden) Anna Hasselborg	4
						23	(South Korea) Kim Eun-jung	5

B Event						Qualifier 4
17	(Sweden) Isabella Wranå	8
17	(Russia) Alina Kovaleva	5	20	(Sweden) Isabella Wranå	10
18	(South Korea) Gim Un-chi	4	20	(South Korea) Team M. Kim	4
18	(South Korea) Team M. Kim	8				24	(Sweden) Isabella Wranå	6
						24	(United States) Tabitha Peterson	8

B Event			Qualifier 5
21	(Japan) Tori Koana	5
21	(Manitoba) Tracy Fleury	6	25	(Manitoba) Tracy Fleury	8
22	(Manitoba) Kerri Einarson	8	25	(Manitoba) Kerri Einarson	5
22	(Japan) Satsuki Fujisawa	5

==== C event ====
C Event						Qualifier 6
26	(Manitoba) Jennifer Jones	5
26	(Japan) Sayaka Yoshimura	4	28	(Manitoba) Jennifer Jones	8
			28	(Japan) Tori Koana	3
						31	(Manitoba) Jennifer Jones	6
						31	(Sweden) Isabella Wranå	5

C Event						Qualifier 7
27	(Russia) Alina Kovaleva	9
27	(South Korea) Gim Un-chi	2	29	(Russia) Alina Kovaleva	7
			29	(Japan) Satsuki Fujisawa	4
						32	(Russia) Alina Kovaleva	7
						32	(Sweden) Anna Hasselborg	3

C Event			Qualifier 8
30	(Alberta) Kelsey Rocque	5
30	(South Korea) Team M. Kim	3	33	(Alberta) Kelsey Rocque	5
			33	(Manitoba) Kerri Einarson	6

=== Knockout results ===
All draw times are listed in Eastern Time (UTC−04:00).

==== Draw 1 ====
Tuesday, October 19, 8:00 am

Sheet A	1	2	3	4	5	6	7	8	9	Final
(Sweden) Anna Hasselborg	1	0	1	1	0	2	0	1	0	6
(Japan) Tori Koana 🔨	0	2	0	0	2	0	2	0	1	7

Sheet B	1	2	3	4	5	6	7	8	Final
(Manitoba) Jennifer Jones 🔨	0	1	0	1	2	0	1	0	5
(United States) Tabitha Peterson	1	0	2	0	0	2	0	1	6

Sheet C	1	2	3	4	5	6	7	8	9	Final
(Manitoba) Kerri Einarson	0	1	0	1	2	0	1	0	1	6
(Sweden) Isabella Wranå 🔨	0	0	1	0	0	2	0	2	0	5

Sheet D	1	2	3	4	5	6	7	8	9	Final
(Russia) Alina Kovaleva 🔨	0	0	1	0	1	0	0	1	0	3
(South Korea) Kim Eun-jung	0	1	0	1	0	1	0	0	1	4

==== Draw 2 ====
Tuesday, October 19, 11:30 am

Sheet A	1	2	3	4	5	6	7	8	Final
(Ontario) Rachel Homan	0	1	0	2	0	2	0	1	6
(Alberta) Kelsey Rocque 🔨	0	0	2	0	1	0	2	0	5

Sheet B	1	2	3	4	5	6	7	8	Final
(Manitoba) Tracy Fleury 🔨	1	0	2	0	1	1	1	X	6
(Japan) Sayaka Yoshimura	0	1	0	1	0	0	0	X	2

Sheet C	1	2	3	4	5	6	7	8	Final
(Switzerland) Silvana Tirinzoni	0	1	4	0	0	0	1	0	6
(South Korea) Gim Un-chi 🔨	0	0	0	0	1	2	0	0	3

Sheet D	1	2	3	4	5	6	7	8	Final
(Japan) Satsuki Fujisawa 🔨	0	0	1	0	3	0	0	1	5
(South Korea) Team M. Kim	0	1	0	1	0	1	0	0	3

==== Draw 5 ====
Wednesday, October 20, 8:00 am

Sheet A	1	2	3	4	5	6	7	8	Final
(South Korea) Gim Un-chi 🔨	3	0	1	0	0	0	0	0	4
(South Korea) Team M. Kim	0	4	0	0	1	1	1	1	8

Sheet B	1	2	3	4	5	6	7	8	Final
(Switzerland) Silvana Tirinzoni 🔨	3	0	3	0	0	1	0	1	8
(Japan) Satsuki Fujisawa	0	2	0	2	2	0	1	0	7

Sheet C	1	2	3	4	5	6	7	8	Final
(Alberta) Kelsey Rocque 🔨	3	0	1	0	0	2	0	0	6
(Japan) Sayaka Yoshimura	0	1	0	1	0	0	1	2	5

Sheet D	1	2	3	4	5	6	7	8	9	Final
(Ontario) Rachel Homan	1	0	2	0	0	1	1	0	1	6
(Manitoba) Tracy Fleury 🔨	0	2	0	1	1	0	0	1	0	5

==== Draw 6 ====
Wednesday, October 20, 12:00 pm

Sheet A	1	2	3	4	5	6	7	8	Final
(Sweden) Isabella Wranå	0	1	0	2	0	3	0	2	8
(Russia) Alina Kovaleva 🔨	1	0	1	0	2	0	1	0	5

Sheet B	1	2	3	4	5	6	7	8	Final
(Manitoba) Kerri Einarson 🔨	0	0	2	0	0	1	0	0	3
(South Korea) Kim Eun-jung	0	1	0	2	0	0	1	1	5

Sheet C	1	2	3	4	5	6	7	8	Final
(Sweden) Anna Hasselborg	0	1	0	3	0	0	2	1	7
(Manitoba) Jennifer Jones 🔨	0	0	2	0	2	1	0	0	5

Sheet D	1	2	3	4	5	6	7	8	Final
(Japan) Tori Koana 🔨	1	0	1	0	0	1	0	0	3
(United States) Tabitha Peterson	0	2	0	1	1	0	0	1	5

==== Draw 9 ====
Thursday, October 21, 7:30 am

Sheet A	1	2	3	4	5	6	7	8	Final
(Manitoba) Kerri Einarson	0	2	0	4	0	0	2	X	8
(Japan) Satsuki Fujisawa 🔨	1	0	1	0	2	1	0	X	5

Sheet B	1	2	3	4	5	6	7	8	Final
(Sweden) Isabella Wranå 🔨	1	0	0	2	0	3	0	4	10
(South Korea) Team M. Kim	0	1	1	0	1	0	1	0	4

Sheet C	1	2	3	4	5	6	7	8	Final
(Japan) Tori Koana 🔨	1	0	0	1	0	1	1	1	5
(Manitoba) Tracy Fleury	0	2	1	0	3	0	0	0	6

Sheet D	1	2	3	4	5	6	7	8	Final
(Sweden) Anna Hasselborg	1	0	0	2	0	1	1	1	6
(Alberta) Kelsey Rocque 🔨	0	1	2	0	2	0	0	0	5

==== Draw 11 ====
Thursday, October 21, 3:00 pm

Sheet A	1	2	3	4	5	6	7	8	9	Final
(South Korea) Kim Eun-jung	0	0	1	1	1	1	0	1	0	5
(Switzerland) Silvana Tirinzoni 🔨	1	3	0	0	0	0	1	0	3	8

Sheet B	1	2	3	4	5	6	7	8	Final
(Russia) Alina Kovaleva 🔨	3	1	0	2	0	1	2	X	9
(South Korea) Gim Un-chi	0	0	1	0	1	0	0	X	2

Sheet C	1	2	3	4	5	6	7	8	Final
(United States) Tabitha Peterson 🔨	1	1	0	2	0	1	0	0	5
(Ontario) Rachel Homan	0	0	1	0	2	0	2	2	7

Sheet D	1	2	3	4	5	6	7	8	Final
(Manitoba) Jennifer Jones	0	2	0	0	1	0	1	1	5
(Japan) Sayaka Yoshimura 🔨	2	0	0	1	0	1	0	0	4

==== Draw 13 ====
Friday, October 22, 7:30 am

Sheet A	1	2	3	4	5	6	7	8	Final
(Manitoba) Jennifer Jones 🔨	3	1	0	2	0	1	1	X	8
(Japan) Tori Koana	0	0	2	0	1	0	0	X	3

Sheet D	1	2	3	4	5	6	7	8	Final
(Russia) Alina Kovaleva 🔨	0	2	0	2	0	0	2	1	7
(Japan) Satsuki Fujisawa	1	0	1	0	1	1	0	0	4

==== Draw 15 ====
Friday, October 22, 3:00 pm

Sheet A	1	2	3	4	5	6	7	8	Final
(Sweden) Anna Hasselborg	1	0	0	1	0	0	2	0	4
(South Korea) Kim Eun-jung 🔨	0	0	1	0	2	1	0	1	5

Sheet B	1	2	3	4	5	6	7	8	Final
(Manitoba) Tracy Fleury 🔨	0	0	2	0	2	0	0	4	8
(Manitoba) Kerri Einarson	1	0	0	2	0	2	0	0	5

Sheet C	1	2	3	4	5	6	7	8	Final
(Alberta) Kelsey Rocque	0	1	0	2	0	1	0	1	5
(South Korea) Team M. Kim 🔨	1	0	1	0	0	0	1	0	3

Sheet D	1	2	3	4	5	6	7	8	Final
(Sweden) Isabella Wranå 🔨	2	0	1	0	0	3	0	0	6
(United States) Tabitha Peterson	0	2	0	1	1	0	3	1	8

==== Draw 17 ====
Saturday, October 23, 8:00 am

Sheet A	1	2	3	4	5	6	7	8	Final
(Russia) Alina Kovaleva	1	0	1	0	3	0	2	X	7
(Sweden) Anna Hasselborg 🔨	0	1	0	1	0	1	0	X	3

Sheet B	1	2	3	4	5	6	7	8	Final
(Alberta) Kelsey Rocque 🔨	1	0	1	1	0	0	2	0	5
(Manitoba) Kerri Einarson	0	3	0	0	1	1	0	1	6

Sheet C	1	2	3	4	5	6	7	8	Final
(Manitoba) Jennifer Jones	0	2	0	1	1	0	0	2	6
(Sweden) Isabella Wranå 🔨	2	0	2	0	0	0	1	0	5

=== Playoffs ===
Quarterfinals
A2	(Switzerland) Silvana Tirinzoni	4
C1	(Manitoba) Jennifer Jones	6
B2	(United States) Tabitha Peterson	5
B1	(South Korea) Kim Eun-jung	6
A1	(Ontario) Rachel Homan	3
C2	(Russia) Alina Kovaleva	5
B3	(Manitoba) Tracy Fleury	6
C3	(Manitoba) Kerri Einarson	2

Semifinals
C1	(Manitoba) Jennifer Jones	9
B1	(South Korea) Kim Eun-jung	3
C2	(Russia) Alina Kovaleva	4
B3	(Manitoba) Tracy Fleury	8

Final
C1	(Manitoba) Jennifer Jones	7
B3	(Manitoba) Tracy Fleury	9

==== Quarterfinals ====
Saturday, October 23, 4:00 pm

Sheet A	1	2	3	4	5	6	7	8	Final
(Manitoba) Tracy Fleury 🔨	0	1	0	2	1	1	1	X	6
(Manitoba) Kerri Einarson	1	0	1	0	0	0	0	X	2

Player percentages
(Manitoba) Team Fleury		(Manitoba) Team Einarson	
Kristin MacCuish	93%	Briane Meilleur	84%
Liz Fyfe	73%	Shannon Birchard	77%
Selena Njegovan	66%	Val Sweeting	52%
Tracy Fleury	73%	Kerri Einarson	48%
Total	76%	Total	65%

Sheet B	1	2	3	4	5	6	7	8	Final
(Switzerland) Silvana Tirinzoni 🔨	0	2	0	0	0	1	1	X	4
(Manitoba) Jennifer Jones	1	0	3	1	1	0	0	X	6

Player percentages
(Switzerland) Team Tirinzoni		(Manitoba) Team Jones	
Melanie Barbezat	95%	Dawn McEwen	95%
Esther Neuenschwander	80%	Jocelyn Peterman	89%
Silvana Tirinzoni	72%	Kaitlyn Lawes	95%
Alina Pätz	55%	Jennifer Jones	70%
Total	76%	Total	88%

Sheet C	1	2	3	4	5	6	7	8	Final
(United States) Tabitha Peterson 🔨	0	0	0	1	1	1	2	0	5
(South Korea) Kim Eun-jung	1	2	1	0	0	0	0	2	6

Player percentages
(United States) Team Peterson		(South Korea) Team Kim	
Tara Peterson	83%	Kim Seon-yeong	72%
Becca Hamilton	67%	Kim Cho-hi	73%
Nina Roth	86%	Kim Kyeong-ae	75%
Tabitha Peterson	59%	Kim Eun-jung	72%
Total	74%	Total	73%

Sheet D	1	2	3	4	5	6	7	8	Final
(Ontario) Rachel Homan 🔨	0	2	0	0	1	0	0	X	3
(Russia) Alina Kovaleva	0	0	3	1	0	1	0	X	5

Player percentages
(Ontario) Team Homan		(Russia) Team Kovaleva	
Joanne Courtney	75%	Ekaterina Kuzmina	88%
Sarah Wilkes	67%	Galina Arsenkina	72%
Emma Miskew	67%	Yulia Portunova	78%
Rachel Homan	67%	Alina Kovaleva	78%
Total	69%	Total	79%

==== Semifinals ====
Saturday, October 23, 8:00 pm

Sheet B	1	2	3	4	5	6	7	8	Final
(Russia) Alina Kovaleva	0	0	3	0	0	1	0	0	4
(Manitoba) Tracy Fleury 🔨	0	2	0	1	0	0	3	2	8

Player percentages
(Russia) Team Kovaleva		(Manitoba) Team Fleury	
Ekaterina Kuzmina	81%	Kristin MacCuish	88%
Galina Arsenkina	78%	Liz Fyfe	84%
Yulia Portunova	84%	Selena Njegovan	66%
Alina Kovaleva	81%	Tracy Fleury	91%
Total	81%	Total	82%

Sheet D	1	2	3	4	5	6	7	8	Final
(Manitoba) Jennifer Jones	1	0	1	0	0	2	5	X	9
(South Korea) Kim Eun-jung 🔨	0	1	0	2	0	0	0	X	3

Player percentages
(Manitoba) Team Jones		(South Korea) Team Kim	
Dawn McEwen	84%	Kim Seon-yeong	68%
Jocelyn Peterman	88%	Kim Cho-hi	75%
Kaitlyn Lawes	86%	Kim Kyeong-ae	75%
Jennifer Jones	86%	Kim Eun-jung	61%
Total	86%	Total	70%

==== Final ====
Sunday, October 24, 12:00 pm

Sheet C	1	2	3	4	5	6	7	8	9	Final
(Manitoba) Jennifer Jones	0	2	1	0	1	0	2	1	0	7
(Manitoba) Tracy Fleury 🔨	3	0	0	3	0	1	0	0	2	9

Player percentages
(Manitoba) Team Jones		(Manitoba) Team Fleury	
Dawn McEwen	82%	Kristin MacCuish	71%
Jocelyn Peterman	75%	Liz Fyfe	86%
Kaitlyn Lawes	72%	Selena Njegovan	74%
Jennifer Jones	64%	Tracy Fleury	72%
Total	73%	Total	76%
