= 2020 Japan Curling Championships =

Japanese national curling championships in 2020

37th Japan Curling Championships
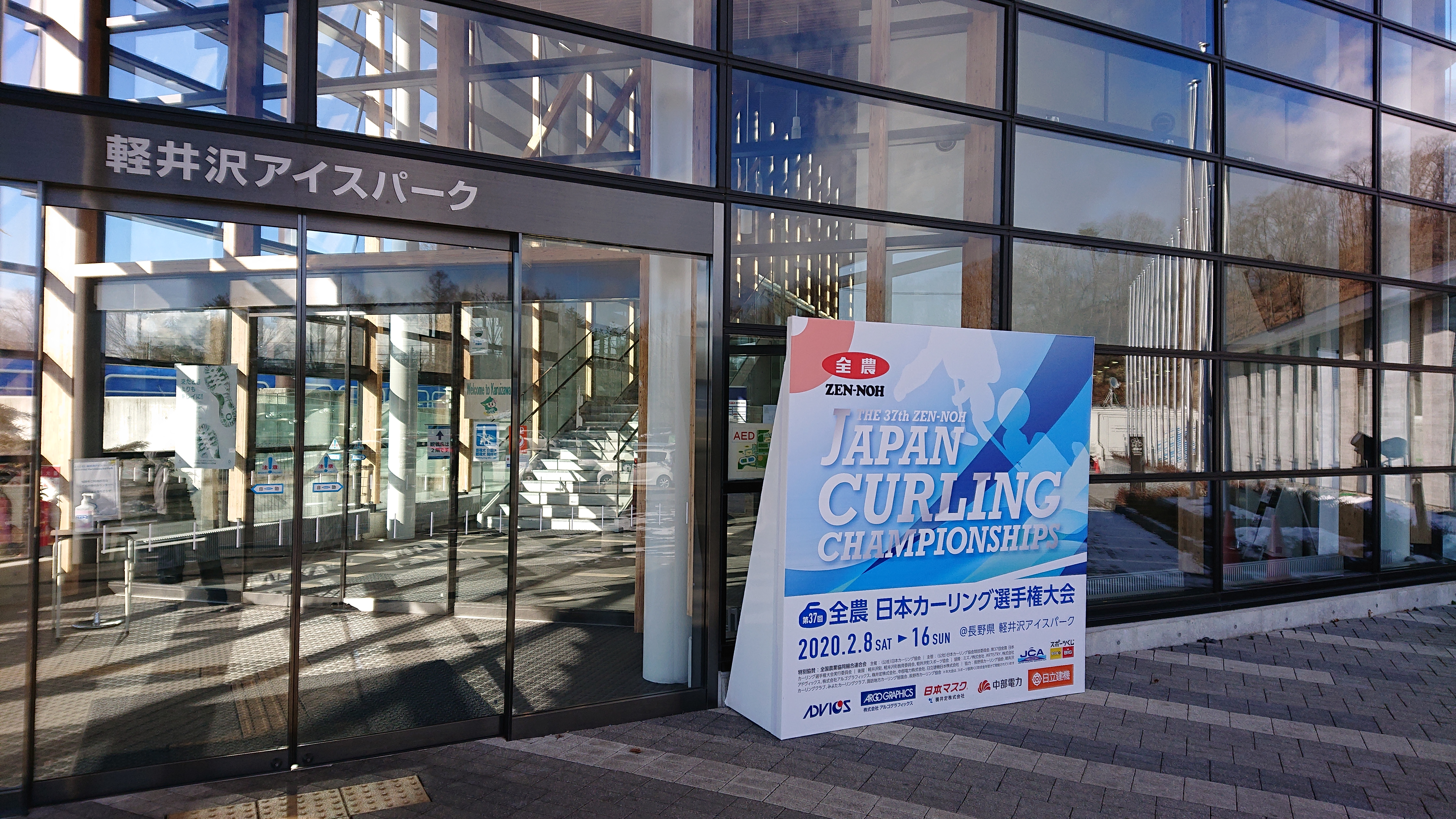
- Host city: Karuizawa, Nagano
- Arena: Karuizawa Ice Park
- Dates: February 8–16, 2020
- Attendance: Men: 9 teams Women: 9 teams
- Men's winner: Consadole
- Skip: Yuta Matsumura
- Third: Tetsuro Shimizu
- Second: Yasumasa Tanida
- Lead: Shinya Abe
- Alternate: Kosuke Aita
- Finalist: TM Karuizawa (Yusuke Morozumi)
- Women's winner: Loco Solare
- Skip: Satsuki Fujisawa
- Third: Chinami Yoshida
- Second: Yumi Suzuki
- Lead: Yurika Yoshida
- Coach: Ryoji Onodera
- Finalist: Chubu Electric Power (Seina Nakajima)

The 2020 Japan Curling Championships (Japanese: 2020年日本カーリング選手権大会), or the 37th Zen-Noh Japan Curling Championships (Japanese: 第37回全農日本カーリング選手権大会), the Japanese national men's and women's curling championships, were held from February 8 to 16 in 2020 at the Karuizawa Ice Park in Karuizawa, Nagano. These championships were organized by the Japan Curling Association (JCA), and sponsored primarily by Zen-Noh. The women's winner was to represent Japan at the 2020 World Women's Curling Championship, but the event was cancelled due to the COVID-19 pandemic.

== Men ==
=== Qualification ===
Qualification	Team	Locale
Last winner	Consadole	Hokkaido
Last runner-up	Team Tokyo	Tokyo
WCT top ranking^{1}	TM Karuizawa	Nagano
Winner of Hokkaido regional championship	City Office Nayoro	Hokkaido
Winner of Tohoku regional championship	Miyagi CA	Miyagi
Winner of Kanto regional championship	Team Tani	Tokyo
Winner of Chubu regional championship	SC Karuizawa Club	Nagano
Winner of Western Japan regional championship	Okayama CA	Okayama
Winner of wild-card competition	Hokkaido University	Hokkaido

Notes

1. Without last winner and runner-up team at end of last October.

=== Teams ===
The teams are listed as follows

Team	Skip	Third	Second	Lead	Alternate	Coach
Consadole	Yuta Matsumura	Tetsuro Shimizu	Yasumasa Tanida	Shinya Abe	Kosuke Aita	—N/a
Team Tokyo	Jumpei Kanda	Hiromu Otani	Kizuki Ryokawa	Shotaro Hashimoto	Shinya Iwamoto	—N/a
TM Karuizawa	Yusuke Morozumi	Masaki Iwai	Ryotaro Shukuya	Kosuke Morozumi	—N/a	—N/a
City Office Nayoro	Yuya Takigahira	Kazuki Yoshikawa	Tatsuya Ogawa	Tomoya Ogawa	Kanya Shimizuno	Kenji Ogawa
Miyagi CA	Kotaro Noguchi	Yuto Kamada	Hiroshi Kato	Yuuki Yoshimura	Naoki Kon	Motoko Kitada
Team Tani	Ryutaro Tani	Syunta Mizukami	Kohei Okamura	Daiki Yamazaki	Takuya Ishikawa	—N/a
SC Karuizawa Club	Tsuyoshi Yamaguchi	Riku Yanagisawa	Satoshi Koizumi	Fukuhiro Ohno	Taisei Kanai	Yuji Nishimuro
Okayama CA	Hiroki Yoshioka	Hiromitsu Fujinaka	Hiroshi Fukui	Yusuke Nonomura	Makoto Kouhashi	
Hokkaido University	Kantaro Kawano	Kazuki Matsuoka	Hiroki Hasegawa	Yusuke Yamashita	Syun Takahashi	—N/a

=== Round-robin standings ===
Final round-robin standings

Key
Q	Teams to playoffs

Team	Skip	W	L	W–L	DSC	PO	Rank
Consadole	Yuta Matsumura	8	0		27.24	Q	1
TM Karuizawa	Yusuke Morozumi	7	1		31.74	Q	2
SC Karuizawa Club	Tsuyoshi Yamaguchi	6	2		21.30	Q	3
City Office Nayoro	Yuya Takigahira	4	4		65.04	Q	4
Team Tani	Ryutaro Tani	3	5	1–1	43.66		5
Okayama CA	Hiroki Yoshioka	3	5	1–1	75.21		6
Team Tokyo	Jumpei Kanda	3	5	1–1	83.11		7
Miyagi CA	Kotaro Noguchi	1	7	1–0	85.69		8
Hokkaido University	Kantaro Kawano	1	7	0–1	76.39		9

=== Round-robin results ===
All draw times are listed in Japan Standard Time (UTC+9).

==== Draw 2 ====
Sunday, February 9, 13:30

Sheet B	1	2	3	4	5	6	7	8	9	10	Final
Consadole (Matsumura)	0	0	2	0	2	0	0	2	0	1	7
TM Karuizawa (Morozumi) 🔨	1	1	0	1	0	0	2	0	1	0	6

Sheet C	1	2	3	4	5	6	7	8	9	10	Final
Okayama CA (Yoshioka)	0	2	1	0	3	0	0	1	1	X	8
Hokkaido University (Kawano) 🔨	2	0	0	1	0	0	2	0	0	X	5

Sheet D	1	2	3	4	5	6	7	8	9	10	Final
Team Tokyo (Kanda)	1	0	0	0	1	0	0	1	0	X	3
City Office Nayoro (Takigahira) 🔨	0	2	1	0	0	1	1	0	1	X	6

Sheet E	1	2	3	4	5	6	7	8	9	10	Final
Team Tani (Tani)	0	0	1	0	0	2	0	1	0	0	4
SC Karuizawa Club (Yamaguchi) 🔨	0	0	0	2	1	0	1	0	1	2	7

==== Draw 4 ====
Monday, February 10, 9:00

Sheet B	1	2	3	4	5	6	7	8	9	10	Final
Okayama CA (Yoshioka)	0	1	0	2	0	2	0	0	0	0	5
City Office Nayoro (Takigahira) 🔨	1	0	1	0	3	0	0	1	0	4	10

Sheet C	1	2	3	4	5	6	7	8	9	10	Final
Miyagi CA (Noguchi)	0	1	0	1	0	0	1	0	1	0	5
Team Tani (Tani) 🔨	1	0	2	0	0	1	0	2	0	1	7

Sheet D	1	2	3	4	5	6	7	8	9	10	Final
TM Karuizawa (Morozumi)	0	2	0	0	1	0	0	0	3	0	6
SC Karuizawa Club (Yamaguchi) 🔨	1	0	2	0	0	0	1	0	0	1	5

Sheet E	1	2	3	4	5	6	7	8	9	10	Final
Consadole (Matsumura) 🔨	1	2	2	0	0	0	1	0	1	X	7
Hokkaido University (Kawano)	0	0	0	0	1	0	0	1	0	X	2

==== Draw 6 ====
Monday, February 10, 18:00

Sheet B	1	2	3	4	5	6	7	8	9	10	Final
City Office Nayoro (Takigahira)	0	1	0	0	0	1	0	X	X	X	2
SC Karuizawa Club (Yamaguchi) 🔨	0	0	1	3	2	0	2	X	X	X	8

Sheet C	1	2	3	4	5	6	7	8	9	10	Final
Team Tokyo (Kanda)	0	0	0	2	0	0	1	X	X	X	3
Consadole (Matsumura) 🔨	2	0	1	0	3	2	0	X	X	X	8

Sheet D	1	2	3	4	5	6	7	8	9	10	Final
Miyagi CA (Noguchi) 🔨	0	0	0	0	0	2	3	0	2	0	7
Hokkaido University (Kawano)	1	0	0	2	1	0	0	1	0	1	6

Sheet E	1	2	3	4	5	6	7	8	9	10	Final
TM Karuizawa (Morozumi) 🔨	0	3	0	3	1	4	X	X	X	X	11
Team Tani (Tani)	0	0	1	0	0	0	X	X	X	X	1

==== Draw 8 ====
Tuesday, February 11, 13:30

Sheet B	1	2	3	4	5	6	7	8	9	10	Final
Team Tani (Tani) 🔨	2	0	0	3	0	2	0	1	0	1	9
Team Tokyo (Kanda)	0	2	0	0	1	0	2	0	1	0	6

Sheet C	1	2	3	4	5	6	7	8	9	10	Final
City Office Nayoro (Takigahira)	0	0	0	0	2	0	0	0	X	X	2
TM Karuizawa (Morozumi) 🔨	0	1	2	1	0	3	1	4	X	X	12

Sheet D	1	2	3	4	5	6	7	8	9	10	Final
SC Karuizawa Club (Yamaguchi)	0	2	0	0	2	0	X	X	X	X	4
Consadole (Matsumura) 🔨	2	0	2	3	0	3	X	X	X	X	10

Sheet E	1	2	3	4	5	6	7	8	9	10	Final
Miyagi CA (Noguchi) 🔨	0	0	0	0	0	0	0	0	X	X	0
Okayama CA (Yoshioka)	1	0	0	1	1	1	1	1	X	X	6

==== Draw 10 ====
Wednesday, February 12, 9:00

Sheet B	1	2	3	4	5	6	7	8	9	10	Final
TM Karuizawa (Morozumi) 🔨	0	2	2	1	0	4	1	X	X	X	10
Miyagi CA (Noguchi)	2	0	0	0	1	0	0	X	X	X	3

Sheet C	1	2	3	4	5	6	7	8	9	10	Final
Hokkaido University (Kawano)	0	0	0	2	0	3	0	1	0	X	6
SC Karuizawa Club (Yamaguchi) 🔨	0	0	1	0	3	0	3	0	1	X	8

Sheet D	1	2	3	4	5	6	7	8	9	10	Final
Okayama CA (Yoshioka) 🔨	0	0	0	0	0	1	0	0	0	X	1
Team Tokyo (Kanda)	0	0	2	1	0	0	0	1	2	X	6

Sheet E	1	2	3	4	5	6	7	8	9	10	Final
City Office Nayoro (Takigahira)	0	0	1	0	0	0	1	0	X	X	2
Consadole (Matsumura) 🔨	3	0	0	0	0	2	0	2	X	X	7

==== Draw 12 ====
Wednesday, February 12, 18:00

Sheet B	1	2	3	4	5	6	7	8	9	10	Final
Hokkaido University (Kawano) 🔨	1	1	2	1	0	1	0	0	0	1	7
Team Tani (Tani)	0	0	0	0	2	0	1	2	1	0	6

Sheet C	1	2	3	4	5	6	7	8	9	10	Final
Consadole (Matsumura) 🔨	2	3	1	0	0	2	0	3	X	X	11
Okayama CA (Yoshioka)	0	0	0	1	0	0	1	0	X	X	2

Sheet D	1	2	3	4	5	6	7	8	9	10	Final
City Office Nayoro (Takigahira) 🔨	0	0	1	1	0	1	2	1	0	X	6
Miyagi CA (Noguchi)	0	0	0	0	2	0	0	0	1	X	3

Sheet E	1	2	3	4	5	6	7	8	9	10	Final
SC Karuizawa Club (Yamaguchi) 🔨	2	0	0	5	1	1	X	X	X	X	9
Team Tokyo (Kanda)	0	0	2	0	0	0	X	X	X	X	2

==== Draw 14 ====
Thursday, February 13, 13:30

Sheet B	1	2	3	4	5	6	7	8	9	10	Final
SC Karuizawa Club (Yamaguchi) 🔨	0	2	0	1	1	0	0	3	2	X	9
Okayama CA (Yoshioka)	0	0	2	0	0	1	0	0	0	X	3

Sheet C	1	2	3	4	5	6	7	8	9	10	Final
Team Tani (Tani) 🔨	1	0	1	0	2	0	0	1	1	X	6
City Office Nayoro (Takigahira)	0	1	0	0	0	1	0	0	0	X	2

Sheet D	1	2	3	4	5	6	7	8	9	10	Final
Hokkaido University (Kawano) 🔨	2	0	0	0	0	2	0	2	0	X	6
TM Karuizawa (Morozumi)	0	1	1	1	2	0	1	0	4	X	10

Sheet E	1	2	3	4	5	6	7	8	9	10	Final
Team Tokyo (Kanda)	0	1	0	3	1	1	0	3	0	2	11
Miyagi CA (Noguchi) 🔨	2	0	3	0	0	0	1	0	2	0	8

==== Draw 16 ====
Friday, February 14, 9:00

Sheet B	1	2	3	4	5	6	7	8	9	10	Final
Team Tokyo (Kanda)	1	0	0	0	1	1	1	0	2	2	8
Hokkaido University (Kawano) 🔨	0	2	0	4	0	0	0	1	0	0	7

Sheet C	1	2	3	4	5	6	7	8	9	10	Final
SC Karuizawa Club (Yamaguchi) 🔨	0	2	1	1	1	3	0	X	X	X	8
Miyagi CA (Noguchi)	1	0	0	0	0	0	1	X	X	X	2

Sheet D	1	2	3	4	5	6	7	8	9	10	Final
Consadole (Matsumura)	0	1	0	2	0	2	1	0	1	X	7
Team Tani (Tani) 🔨	0	0	2	0	0	0	0	1	0	X	3

Sheet E	1	2	3	4	5	6	7	8	9	10	Final
Okayama CA (Yoshioka)	0	0	1	0	1	0	0	X	X	X	2
TM Karuizawa (Morozumi) 🔨	1	2	0	3	0	2	3	X	X	X	11

==== Draw 18 ====
Friday, February 14, 18:00

Sheet B	1	2	3	4	5	6	7	8	9	10	Final
Miyagi CA (Noguchi)	0	1	0	1	0	1	0	0	X	X	3
Consadole (Matsumura) 🔨	2	0	2	0	1	0	2	5	X	X	12

Sheet C	1	2	3	4	5	6	7	8	9	10	Final
TM Karuizawa (Morozumi) 🔨	1	1	4	0	3	1	X	X	X	X	10
Team Tokyo (Kanda)	0	0	0	1	0	0	X	X	X	X	1

Sheet D	1	2	3	4	5	6	7	8	9	10	Final
Team Tani (Tani)	0	0	0	0	1	0	4	2	2	0	9
Okayama CA (Yoshioka) 🔨	3	1	0	2	0	3	0	0	0	1	10

Sheet E	1	2	3	4	5	6	7	8	9	10	Final
Hokkaido University (Kawano)	0	0	2	1	0	0	2	X	X	X	5
City Office Nayoro (Takigahira) 🔨	1	2	0	0	3	5	0	X	X	X	11

=== Playoffs ===
Quarter-finals
1	Consadole (Matsumura)	10
2	TM Karuizawa (Morozumi)	3
3	SC Karuizawa Club (Yamaguchi)	9
4	City Office Nayoro (Takigahira)	3

Semi-final
2	TM Karuizawa (Morozumi)	6
3	SC Karuizawa Club (Yamaguchi)	5

Gold-medal game
1	Consadole (Matsumura)	6
2	TM Karuizawa (Morozumi)	4

==== Quarter-finals ====
Saturday, February 15, 10:00

Sheet B	1	2	3	4	5	6	7	8	9	10	Final
Consadole (Matsumura) 🔨	1	0	0	3	0	0	3	0	3	X	10
TM Karuizawa (Morozumi)	0	0	0	0	0	2	0	1	0	X	3

Sheet C	1	2	3	4	5	6	7	8	9	10	Final
SC Karuizawa Club (Yamaguchi) 🔨	0	0	1	0	0	0	1	0	2	5	9
City Office Nayoro (Takigahira)	0	0	0	0	0	2	0	1	0	0	3

==== Semi-final ====
Saturday, February 15, 15:00

Sheet D	1	2	3	4	5	6	7	8	9	10	Final
TM Karuizawa (Morozumi) 🔨	2	0	0	0	1	0	1	0	0	2	6
SC Karuizawa Club (Yamaguchi)	0	0	2	1	0	1	0	1	0	0	5

==== Gold-medal game ====
Sunday, February 16, 10:00

Sheet C	1	2	3	4	5	6	7	8	9	10	Final
Consadole (Matsumura) 🔨	2	1	0	0	0	0	2	0	1	X	6
TM Karuizawa (Morozumi)	0	0	1	1	0	0	0	2	0	X	4

=== Final standings ===
Rank	Team	Skip
1st place, gold medalist(s)	Consadole	Yuta Matsumura
2nd place, silver medalist(s)	TM Karuizawa	Yusuke Morozumi
3rd place, bronze medalist(s)	SC Karuizawa Club	Tsuyoshi Yamaguchi
4	City Office Nayoro	Yuya Takigahira
5	Team Tani	Ryutaro Tani
6	Okayama CA	Hiroki Yoshioka
7	Team Tokyo	Jumpei Kanda
8	Miyagi CA	Kotaro Noguchi
9	Hokkaido University	Kantaro Kawano

== Women ==
=== Qualification ===
Qualification	Team	Locale	Skip
Last winner	Chubu Electric Power	Nagano	Seina Nakajima
Last runner-up	Loco Solare	Hokkaido	Satsuki Fujisawa
WCT top ranking^{2}	Hokkaido Bank	Hokkaido	Sayaka Yoshimura
Winner of Hokkaido regional championship	Sapporo Association	Hokkaido	Honoka Sasaki
Winner of Tohoku regional championship	Aomori CA	Aomori	Juri Ojima
Winner of Kanto regional championship	Fujikyu	Yamanashi	Tori Koana
Winner of Chubu regional championship	Team Karuizawa	Nagano	Yumiko Kashiwagi
Winner of Western Japan regional championship	Team Hiroshima	Hiroshima	Yuki Nobutoh
Winner of wild-card competition	Team Tokyo	Tokyo	Shiori Fujisawa

Notes

2. Without last winner and runner-up team at end of last October.

=== Teams ===
The teams are listed as follows:

Key
(S)	Skip

Team	Fourth	Third	Second	Lead	Alternate	Coach
Chubu Electric Power	Ikue Kitazawa	Chiaki Matsumura	Seina Nakajima (S)	Hasumi Ishigooka	Emi Shimizu	Yusuke Morozumi
Loco Solare	Satsuki Fujisawa (S)	Chinami Yoshida	Yumi Suzuki	Yurika Yoshida	—N/a	Ryoji Onodera
Hokkaido Bank	Sayaka Yoshimura (S)	Kaho Onodera	Anna Ohmiya	Yumie Funayama	—N/a	Connor Njegovan
Sapporo Association	Honoka Sasaki (S)	Mikoto Nakajima	Yui Ohzeki	Miku Nihira	Yuina Miura	Kumiko Shimamura
Sapporo Association	Honoka Sasaki (S)	Mikoto Nakajima	Yui Ohzeki	Miku Nihira	Yuina Miura	Takayuki Doi
Aomori CA	Shinobu Aota	Juri Ojima (S)	Natsuki Saito	Kaoru Ito	—N/a	Chieri Yamashita
Fujikyu	Tori Koana (S)	Yuna Kotani	Mao Ishigaki	Arisa Kotani	Haruka Hosoda	James Howard Cotter
Team Karuizawa	Yumiko Kashiwagi (S)	Misako Den	Yuka Takimoto	Makiko Uehara	Yukie Katase	Hiroaki Kashiwagi
Team Hiroshima	Yuki Nobutoh (S)	Riho Zaikan	Ikumi Masuki	Akari Iwatani	Miwako Tatsudan	
Team Tokyo	Kai Tsuchiya	Shiori Fujisawa (S)	Marina Oiwa	Saki Sogawa	Noriko Ishimura	—N/a

=== Round-robin standings ===
Final round-robin standings

Key
Q	Teams to playoffs

Team	Skip	W	L	W–L	DSC	PO	Rank
Chubu Electric Power	Seina Nakajima	8	0		70.10	Q	1
Loco Solare	Satsuki Fujisawa	7	1		56.85	Q	2
Hokkaido Bank	Sayaka Yoshimura	6	2		52.31	Q	3
Fujikyu	Tori Koana	4	4	1–0	46.95	Q	4
Aomori CA	Juri Ojima	4	4	0–1	90.24		5
Team Karuizawa	Yumiko Kashiwagi	3	5		44.49		6
Sapporo Association	Honoka Sasaki	2	6	1–0	77.35		7
Team Tokyo	Shiori Fujisawa	2	6	0–1	72.24		8
Team Hiroshima	Yuki Nobutoh	0	8		103.34		9

=== Round-robin results ===
All draw times are listed in Japan Standard Time (UTC+9).

==== Draw 1 ====
Sunday, February 9, 9:00

Sheet B	1	2	3	4	5	6	7	8	9	10	Final
Team Karuizawa (Kashiwagi) 🔨	1	0	0	0	1	0	0	1	X	X	3
Team Tokyo (Shiori Fujisawa)	0	5	2	1	0	1	1	0	X	X	10

Sheet C	1	2	3	4	5	6	7	8	9	10	Final
Chubu Electric Power (Nakajima) 🔨	0	0	2	1	2	1	2	X	X	X	8
Aomori CA (Ojima)	0	1	0	0	0	0	0	X	X	X	1

Sheet D	1	2	3	4	5	6	7	8	9	10	Final
Hokkaido Bank (Yoshimura) 🔨	0	0	0	2	1	1	0	1	0	0	6
Fujikyu (Koana)	0	0	1	0	0	0	1	0	1	2	5

Sheet E	1	2	3	4	5	6	7	8	9	10	Final
Team Hiroshima (Nobutoh)	0	0	0	0	0	0	1	X	X	X	1
Loco Solare (Satsuki Fujisawa) 🔨	2	1	1	3	1	2	0	X	X	X	10

==== Draw 3 ====
Sunday, February 9, 18:00

Sheet B	1	2	3	4	5	6	7	8	9	10	Final
Team Hiroshima (Nobutoh)	0	1	0	0	0	0	X	X	X	X	1
Fujikyu (Koana) 🔨	4	0	2	5	1	1	X	X	X	X	13

Sheet C	1	2	3	4	5	6	7	8	9	10	Final
Loco Solare (Satsuki Fujisawa) 🔨	4	1	0	0	4	4	X	X	X	X	13
Team Tokyo (Shiori Fujisawa)	0	0	2	0	0	0	X	X	X	X	2

Sheet D	1	2	3	4	5	6	7	8	9	10	Final
Sapporo Association (Sasaki) 🔨	0	0	0	1	0	2	0	2	0	X	5
Team Karuizawa (Kashiwagi)	0	0	0	0	3	0	2	0	3	X	8

Sheet E	1	2	3	4	5	6	7	8	9	10	Final
Hokkaido Bank (Yoshimura) 🔨	0	1	1	0	2	0	3	0	1	X	8
Aomori CA (Ojima)	1	0	0	1	0	1	0	1	0	X	4

==== Draw 5 ====
Monday, February 10, 13:30

Sheet B	1	2	3	4	5	6	7	8	9	10	Final
Loco Solare (Satsuki Fujisawa)	2	0	3	0	0	1	0	2	X	X	8
Team Karuizawa (Kashiwagi) 🔨	0	1	0	0	0	0	1	0	X	X	2

Sheet C	1	2	3	4	5	6	7	8	9	10	Final
Sapporo Association (Sasaki) 🔨	0	0	0	0	0	2	0	2	0	X	4
Fujikyu (Koana)	0	1	1	0	3	0	1	0	1	X	7

Sheet D	1	2	3	4	5	6	7	8	9	10	Final
Chubu Electric Power (Nakajima)	0	3	2	0	4	0	5	X	X	X	14
Team Hiroshima (Nobutoh) 🔨	1	0	0	1	0	1	0	X	X	X	3

Sheet E	1	2	3	4	5	6	7	8	9	10	Final
Aomori CA (Ojima)	2	0	0	0	3	1	0	1	0	2	9
Team Tokyo (Shiori Fujisawa) 🔨	0	0	1	2	0	0	1	0	3	0	7

==== Draw 7 ====
Tuesday, February 11, 9:00

Sheet B	1	2	3	4	5	6	7	8	9	10	Final
Sapporo Association (Sasaki)	0	1	0	0	1	0	1	0	X	X	3
Hokkaido Bank (Yoshimura) 🔨	0	0	3	3	0	1	0	2	X	X	9

Sheet C	1	2	3	4	5	6	7	8	9	10	Final
Team Tokyo (Shiori Fujisawa) 🔨	2	1	0	0	2	0	0	2	0	X	7
Team Hiroshima (Nobutoh)	0	0	1	1	0	1	0	0	1	X	4

Sheet D	1	2	3	4	5	6	7	8	9	10	Final
Aomori CA (Ojima)	0	1	0	0	0	1	0	0	X	X	2
Loco Solare (Satsuki Fujisawa) 🔨	3	0	0	3	2	0	0	1	X	X	9

Sheet E	1	2	3	4	5	6	7	8	9	10	Final
Team Karuizawa (Kashiwagi) 🔨	1	0	2	1	0	0	1	0	0	X	5
Chubu Electric Power (Nakajima)	0	3	0	0	1	1	0	2	1	X	8

==== Draw 9 ====
Tuesday, February 11, 18:00

Sheet B	1	2	3	4	5	6	7	8	9	10	Final
Aomori CA (Ojima) 🔨	0	1	0	2	1	3	1	X	X	X	8
Team Hiroshima (Nobutoh)	0	0	1	0	0	0	0	X	X	X	1

Sheet C	1	2	3	4	5	6	7	8	9	10	Final
Hokkaido Bank (Yoshimura) 🔨	0	0	0	0	0	1	X	X	X	X	1
Chubu Electric Power (Nakajima)	1	1	3	1	2	0	X	X	X	X	8

Sheet D	1	2	3	4	5	6	7	8	9	10	Final
Fujikyu (Koana) 🔨	3	0	5	2	0	1	X	X	X	X	11
Team Tokyo (Shiori Fujisawa)	0	1	0	0	1	0	X	X	X	X	2

Sheet E	1	2	3	4	5	6	7	8	9	10	Final
Loco Solare (Satsuki Fujisawa)	0	2	0	1	0	1	0	3	0	1	8
Sapporo Association (Sasaki) 🔨	1	0	0	0	2	0	1	0	2	0	6

==== Draw 11 ====
Wednesday, February 12, 13:30

Sheet B	1	2	3	4	5	6	7	8	9	10	Final
Team Tokyo (Shiori Fujisawa) 🔨	0	0	0	0	0	0	0	X	X	X	0
Chubu Electric Power (Nakajima)	1	2	1	1	2	1	3	X	X	X	11

Sheet C	1	2	3	4	5	6	7	8	9	10	Final
Aomori CA (Ojima)	0	0	2	1	1	0	1	1	0	1	7
Sapporo Association (Sasaki) 🔨	1	0	0	0	0	1	0	0	2	0	4

Sheet D	1	2	3	4	5	6	7	8	9	10	Final
Team Hiroshima (Nobutoh)	0	0	0	1	0	0	X	X	X	X	1
Hokkaido Bank (Yoshimura) 🔨	0	3	4	0	2	3	X	X	X	X	12

Sheet E	1	2	3	4	5	6	7	8	9	10	Final
Fujikyu (Koana)	0	0	0	1	0	0	0	0	3	X	4
Team Karuizawa (Kashiwagi) 🔨	0	4	2	0	1	2	0	1	0	X	10

==== Draw 13 ====
Thursday, February 13, 9:00

Sheet B	1	2	3	4	5	6	7	8	9	10	Final
Chubu Electric Power (Nakajima) 🔨	2	0	0	2	0	2	0	5	X	X	11
Sapporo Association (Sasaki)	0	2	0	0	1	0	1	0	X	X	4

Sheet C	1	2	3	4	5	6	7	8	9	10	Final
Fujikyu (Koana)	0	0	3	0	1	0	1	0	1	0	6
Loco Solare (Satsuki Fujisawa) 🔨	3	1	0	1	0	2	0	1	0	1	9

Sheet D	1	2	3	4	5	6	7	8	9	10	Final
Team Karuizawa (Kashiwagi)	0	0	0	0	1	0	1	0	0	X	2
Aomori CA (Ojima) 🔨	0	1	1	2	0	1	0	0	1	X	6

Sheet E	1	2	3	4	5	6	7	8	9	10	Final
Team Tokyo (Shiori Fujisawa)	0	0	2	0	1	0	0	0	1	X	4
Hokkaido Bank (Yoshimura) 🔨	2	2	0	3	0	0	0	2	0	X	9

==== Draw 15 ====
Thursday, February 13, 18:00

Sheet B	1	2	3	4	5	6	7	8	9	10	Final
Hokkaido Bank (Yoshimura)	0	0	0	0	0	2	0	1	0	1	4
Loco Solare (Satsuki Fujisawa) 🔨	1	0	1	0	0	0	3	0	0	0	5

Sheet C	1	2	3	4	5	6	7	8	9	10	Final
Team Hiroshima (Nobutoh)	0	1	0	0	1	0	0	0	X	X	2
Team Karuizawa (Kashiwagi) 🔨	2	0	0	2	0	1	4	2	X	X	11

Sheet D	1	2	3	4	5	6	7	8	9	10	Final
Team Tokyo (Shiori Fujisawa) 🔨	0	0	0	1	0	1	0	2	0	X	4
Sapporo Association (Sasaki)	1	0	3	0	2	0	1	0	1	X	8

Sheet E	1	2	3	4	5	6	7	8	9	10	Final
Chubu Electric Power (Nakajima) 🔨	2	0	2	0	0	2	0	2	0	X	8
Fujikyu (Koana)	0	0	0	1	0	0	2	0	1	X	4

==== Draw 17 ====
Friday, February 14, 13:30

Sheet B	1	2	3	4	5	6	7	8	9	10	Final
Fujikyu (Koana) 🔨	2	0	0	3	0	0	2	0	1	X	8
Aomori CA (Ojima)	0	1	0	0	1	0	0	1	0	X	3

Sheet C	1	2	3	4	5	6	7	8	9	10	Final
Team Karuizawa (Kashiwagi)	0	1	2	0	0	0	0	1	0	X	4
Hokkaido Bank (Yoshimura) 🔨	1	0	0	3	1	2	1	0	1	X	9

Sheet D	1	2	3	4	5	6	7	8	9	10	11	Final
Loco Solare (Satsuki Fujisawa)	0	0	1	0	1	0	2	0	2	1	0	7
Chubu Electric Power (Nakajima) 🔨	2	0	0	3	0	1	0	1	0	0	1	8

Sheet E	1	2	3	4	5	6	7	8	9	10	Final
Sapporo Association (Sasaki)	0	1	1	0	3	0	1	1	0	1	8
Team Hiroshima (Nobutoh) 🔨	1	0	0	1	0	2	0	0	2	0	7

=== Playoffs ===
Quarter-finals
1	Chubu Electric Power (Nakajima)	4
2	Loco Solare (Fujisawa)	5
3	Hokkaido Bank (Yoshimura)	5
4	Fujikyu (Koana)	4

Semi-final
1	Chubu Electric Power (Nakajima)	10
3	Hokkaido Bank (Yoshimura)	4

Gold-medal game
2	Loco Solare (Fujisawa)	7
1	Chubu Electric Power (Nakajima)	6

==== Quarter-finals ====
Saturday, February 15, 10:00

Sheet D	1	2	3	4	5	6	7	8	9	10	Final
Hokkaido Bank (Yoshimura) 🔨	0	1	0	0	0	0	3	0	0	1	5
Fujikyu (Koana)	0	0	1	0	1	1	0	1	0	0	4

Sheet E	1	2	3	4	5	6	7	8	9	10	Final
Chubu Electric Power (Nakajima) 🔨	0	2	0	0	1	0	0	1	0	0	4
Loco Solare (Fujisawa)	0	0	2	0	0	0	2	0	0	1	5

==== Semi-final ====
Saturday, February 15, 15:00

Sheet B	1	2	3	4	5	6	7	8	9	10	Final
Chubu Electric Power (Nakajima) 🔨	0	2	4	1	0	1	0	2	X	X	10
Hokkaido Bank (Yoshimura)	0	0	0	0	1	0	3	0	X	X	4

==== Gold-medal game ====
Sunday, February 16, 15:30

Sheet C	1	2	3	4	5	6	7	8	9	10	11	Final
Loco Solare (Fujisawa) 🔨	1	0	1	0	1	1	0	0	2	0	1	7
Chubu Electric Power (Nakajima)	0	1	0	2	0	0	1	1	0	1	0	6

=== Final standings ===
Rank	Team	Skip
1st place, gold medalist(s)	Loco Solare	Satsuki Fujisawa
2nd place, silver medalist(s)	Chubu Electric Power	Seina Nakajima
3rd place, bronze medalist(s)	Hokkaido Bank	Sayaka Yoshimura
4	Fujikyu	Tori Koana
5	Aomori CA	Juri Ojima
6	Team Karuizawa	Yumiko Kashiwagi
7	Sapporo Association	Honoka Sasaki
8	Team Tokyo	Shiori Fujisawa
9	Team Hiroshima	Yuki Nobutoh
