= Japan Mixed Doubles Curling Championship =

- Established: 2007
- 2026 host city: Aomori, Aomori
- 2026 arena: Aomori City Sports Hall
- 2026 champion: (Yamanashi Prefecture) Tori Koana / (Hokkaido) Go Aoki

The Japan Mixed Doubles Curling Championship is the national curling championship for mixed doubles curling in Japan. It has been held annually since the 2007–2008 season, organized by the Japan Curling Association (JCA). The winners get to represent Japan at the World Mixed Doubles Curling Championship.

The first three championships (2007, 2008, 2009) were held in December, since then they have been held in February or March.

== List of champions and medallists ==
Team line-ups shows in order: man, woman, coach (if exists).

Edition	Year	Host city, arena, dates	Champion	Runner-up	Bronze
1	2007	Tokoro, Hokkaido; Tokoro Curling Hall; December 21–24, 2007	Team Iwate ( Iwate); M: Kenji Tomabechi; W: Michiko Taira	Team Tokoro ( Hokkaido); M: Makoto Tsuruga; W: Ayumi Onodera	Tokoro Club ( Hokkaido); M: Ryoji Onodera; W: Kaho Onodera
2	2008	Karuizawa, Nagano; SCAP Karuizawa; December 19–23, 2008	Obihiro ( Hokkaido); M: Fukuhiro Ohno; W: Atsuko Matsuda	Team Matsumura ( Nagano); M: Tamotsu Matsumura; W: Nagisa Matsumura	Team Iwate ( Iwate); M: Kenji Tomabechi; W: Michiko Tomabechi
3	2009	Aomori, Aomori; Aomori City Sports Complex; December 19–23, 2009	Hirosaki Health Center, Gappo CC ( Aomori); M: Naomasa Takeda; W: Tomoko Takeda	Team Iwate ( Iwate); M: Kenji Tomabechi; W: Michiko Tomabechi	Team Matsumura ( Nagano); M: Tamotsu Matsumura; W: Nagisa Matsumura
4	2011	Karuizawa, Nagano; SCAP Karuizawa; March 2–6, 2011	Team Iwate ( Iwate); M: Kenji Tomabechi; W: Michiko Tomabechi; C:	Tokyo University of Agriculture ( Hokkaido); M: Kento Fujisawa; W: Yuka Sohma	Hirosaki Health Center, Gappo CC ( Aomori); M: Naomasa Takeda; W: Tomoko Takeda
5	2012	Tokoro, Hokkaido; Tokoro Curling Hall; February 24 – March 4, 2012	Team Iwate ( Iwate); M: Kenji Tomabechi; W: Michiko Tomabechi	Team Tokachi ( Hokkaido); M: Fukuhiro Ohno; W: Yuka Murakami	Team Shibetsu ( Hokkaido); M: Noriya Sasaki; W: Mika Sasaki
6	2013	Karuizawa, Nagano; SCAP Karuizawa; February 20–24, 2013	Team Asama ( Nagano); M: Hiroaki Kashiwagi; W: Yumiko Sato	Bansei Curling Club ( Hokkaido); M: Naomasa Takeda; W: Tomoko Takeda	Karuizawa CC ( Nagano); M: Yasuo Mochida; W: Mitsuki Sato
7	2014	Aomori, Aomori; Aomori City Sports Complex; February 19–23, 2014	Karuizawa CC ( Nagano); M: Yasuo Mochida; W: Mitsuki Sato; C:	Moseushi Association ( Hokkaido); M: Koji Nisato; W: Yoshiko Miura	Team Sapporo ( Hokkaido); M: Yuji Yamamoto; W: Mayumi Goriki
8	2015	Karuizawa, Nagano; Karuizawa Ice Park; February 25 – March 1, 2015	Team Iwate ( Iwate); M: Kenji Tomabechi; W: Michiko Tomabechi	Hokkaido University ( Hokkaido); M: Syunta Mizukami; W: Kotomi Mochizuki	Team Takeda ( Hokkaido); M: Naomasa Takeda; W: Tomoko Takeda
9	2016	Moseushi, Hokkaido; Sesukaushi-cho Curling Hall; February 24–28, 2016	Hokkaido University ( Hokkaido); M: Takuma Makanae; W: Eri Araki	Team Aoki ( Hokkaido); M: Go Aoki; W: Haruka Fujii	Sapporo International University ( Hokkaido); M: Ryotaro Shukuya; W: Nanae Shukuya
10	2017	Tokoro, Hokkaido; ADVICS Tokoro Curling Hall; March 1–5, 2017	Team Abe (Hokkaido); M: Shinya Abe; W: Ayumi Ogasawara	Team Aoki ( Hokkaido); M: Go Aoki; W: Haruka Fujii	Team Matsumura ( Hokkaido); M: Yuta Matsumura; W: Sayaka Yoshimura
11	2018	Aomori, Aomori; Michinoku Bank Dream Stadium; March 14–18, 2018	Fujisawa/Yamaguchi ( Hokkaido/ Nagano); M: Tsuyoshi Yamaguchi; W: Satsuki Fujisawa	Team Hirata ( Nagano); M: Kohsuke Hirata; W: Ikue Kitazawa	Yoshida/Shimizu ( Hokkaido/ Nagano); M: Tetsuro Shimizu; W: Chinami Yoshida; C: Yasumasa Tanida
12	2019	Karuizawa, Nagano; Karuizawa Ice Park; March 12–17, 2019	Fujisawa/Yamaguchi ( Hokkaido/ Nagano); M: Tsuyoshi Yamaguchi; W: Satsuki Fujisawa	Suzuki/Hirata ( Hokkaido); M: Kohsuke Hirata; W: Yumi Suzuki; C: Ryoji Onodera	Sapporo International University ( Hokkaido); M: Ryotaro Shukuya; W: Sayaka Yoshimura; C: Gaku Suzuki
13	2020	Sapporo, Hokkaido; Hokkaido Bank Curling Stadium; February 25 – March 1, 2020	Matsumura/Tanida ( Nagano/ Hokkaido); M: Yasumasa Tanida; W: Chiaki Matsumura	Fujisawa/Yamaguchi ( Hokkaido/ Nagano); M: Tsuyoshi Yamaguchi; W: Satsuki Fujisawa	Yoshida/Shimizu ( Hokkaido); M: Tetsuro Shimizu; W: Chinami Yoshida
14	2021	Aomori, Aomori; Michinoku Bank Dream Stadium; February 23–28, 2021	Yoshida/Matsumura ( Hokkaido); M: Yuta Matsumura; W: Yurika Yoshida	Matsumura/Tanida ( Nagano / Hokkaido); M: Yasumasa Tanida; W: Chiaki Matsumura	Koana/Aoki ( Yamanashi / Hokkaido); M: Go Aoki; W: Tori Koana
15	2022	cancelled			
16	2023	Wakkanai, Hokkaido; Wakkanai City Green Sports Park; February 21–26, 2023	Matsumura/Tanida (Nagano / Hokkaido); M: Yasumasa Tanida; W: Chiaki Matsumura; C: Emi Shimizu	Koana/Aoki (Yamanashi / Hokkaido); M: Go Aoki; W: Tori Koana; C: Yoshinori Aoki	Yoshida/Matsumura (Hokkaido / Nagano); M: Yuta Matsumura; W: Yurika Yoshida; C: Yusuke Morozumi
17	2024	Karuizawa, Nagano; Karuizawa Ice Park; February 26 – March 3, 2024	Ueno/Yamaguchi (Nagano); M: Tsuyoshi Yamaguchi; W: Miyu Ueno; C: Yuji Nishimuro	Onodera/Maeda (Hokkaido); M: Takumi Maeda; W: Kaho Onodera; C: Ryoji Onodera	Koana/Aoki (Yamanashi / Hokkaido); M: Go Aoki; W: Tori Koana; C: Yoshinori Aoki
18	2025	Wakkanai, Hokkaido; Wakkanai City Midori Sports Park; December 2–8, 2024	Matsumura/Tanida (Nagano / Hokkaido); M: Yasumasa Tanida; W: Chiaki Matsumura; C: Emi Shimizu	Koana/Aoki (Yamanashi / Hokkaido); M: Go Aoki; W: Tori Koana; C: Yoshinori Aoki	Kitazawa/Usui (Nagano / Hokkaido); M: Shingo Usui; W: Ikue Kitazawa
19	2026	Aomori, Aomori; Aomori City Sports Hall; March 3–8, 2026	Koana/Aoki (Yamanashi / Hokkaido); M: Go Aoki; W: Tori Koana; C: Yoshinori Aoki	Matsumura/Tanida (Nagano / Hokkaido); M: Yasumasa Tanida; W: Chiaki Matsumura; C: Shinya Abe	Ichinohe/Suzuki (Aomori); M: Minori Suzuki; W: Hiyori Ichinohe; C: Misaki Tanaka

== Medal record for curlers ==
As of 2026

Curler	Gold	Silver	Bronze
Kenji Tomabechi	4	1	1
Michiko Tomabechi (Michiko Taira)	4	1	1
Chiaki Matsumura	3	2	
Yasumasa Tanida	3	2	
Tsuyoshi Yamaguchi	3	1	
Satsuki Fujisawa	2	1	
Go Aoki	1	4	2
Tori Koana	1	2	2
Naomasa Takeda	1	1	2
Tomoko Takeda	1	1	2
Ayumi Ogasawara (Ayumi Onodera)	1	1	
Yuta Matsumura	1		2
Yurika Yoshida	1		1
Yasuo Mochida	1		1
Mitsuki Sato	1		1
Shinya Abe	1		
Eri Araki	1		
Hiroaki Kashiwagi	1		
Atsuko Matsuda	1		
Takuma Makanae	1		
Fukuhiro Ohno	1		
Yumiko Kashiwagi (Yumiko Sato)	1		
Miyu Ueno	1		
Kohsuke Hirata		2	
Haruka Fujii		2	
Ikue Kitazawa		1	1
Kaho Onodera		1	1
Tamotsu Matsumura		1	1
Nagisa Matsumura		1	1
Yumi Suzuki		1	
Kento Fujisawa		1	
Yuka Sohma		1	
Makoto Tsuruga		1	
Fukuhiro Ohno		1	
Yuka Murakami		1	
Koji Nisato		1	
Yoshiko Miura		1	
Syunta Mizukami		1	
Kotomi Mochizuki		1	
Takumi Maeda		1	
Sayaka Yoshimura			2
Tetsuro Shimizu			2
Chinami Yoshida			2
Ryotaro Shukuya			2
Nanae Shukuya			1
Ryoji Onodera			1
Noriya Sasaki			1
Mika Sasaki			1
Yuji Yamamoto			1
Mayumi Goriki			1
Shingo Usui			1
Hiyori Ichinohe			1
Minori Suzuki			1

== See also ==
- Japan Men's/Women's Curling Championships
- Japan Mixed Curling Championship
- Japan Junior Curling Championships
- Japan Senior Curling Championships
