= 2018 World Women's Curling Championship =

- Host city: North Bay, Ontario
- Arena: North Bay Memorial Gardens
- Dates: March 17–25
- Attendance: 69,391
- Winner: Canada
- Curling club: St. Vital Curling Club, Winnipeg
- Skip: Jennifer Jones
- Third: Kaitlyn Lawes
- Second: Jill Officer
- Lead: Dawn McEwen
- Alternate: Shannon Birchard
- Coach: Wendy Morgan
- Finalist: Sweden (Anna Hasselborg)

The 2018 World Women's Curling Championship (branded as the 2018 Ford World Women's Curling Championship for sponsorship reasons) was held from March 17–25 at the North Bay Memorial Gardens in North Bay, Ontario, Canada. The format of the tournament was changed this year, with 13 teams qualifying for the tournament (as opposed to 12 in previous years), and the top 6 teams from round-robin play will qualify for the playoffs (rather than 4). The playoff system were single-knockout, where the top two teams received a bye while the remaining four played the first round.

The event was won by Canada's Jennifer Jones rink from Winnipeg; the second world championship for the 2014 Olympic gold medallists.

Off the ice, the event was a success and set an attendance record for a women's world championship held in Canada. Jennifer Jones was complimentary of the fans, saying she had never played in a louder arena.

== Qualification ==
The following nations are qualified to participate in the 2018 World Women's Curling Championship:

- Canada (host country)
- One team from the Americas zone
  - United States
- Eight teams from the 2017 European Curling Championships
  - Czech Republic
  - Denmark
  - Germany
  - Italy
  - Russia
  - Scotland
  - Sweden
  - Switzerland
- Three teams from the 2017 Pacific-Asia Curling Championships
  - China
  - Japan
  - South Korea

== Teams ==
The teams are as follows:

Canada	China	Czech Republic	Denmark	Germany
St. Vital CC, Winnipeg Skip: Jennifer Jones; Third: Kaitlyn Lawes; Second: Jill Officer; Lead: Dawn McEwen; Alternate: Shannon Birchard	Harbin CC, Harbin Skip: Jiang Yilun; Third: Wang Rui; Second: Jiang Xindi; Lead: Yan Hui; Alternate: Yao Mingyue	CC Sokol Liboc, Prague Skip: Anna Kubešková; Third: Alžběta Baudyšová; Second: Tereza Plíšková; Lead: Klára Svatoňová; Alternate: Ezhen Kolchevskaia	Tårnby CC, Tårnby Skip: Angelina Jensen; Third: Christine Grønbech; Second: Camilla Skårberg Jensen; Lead: Lina Knudsen; Alternate: Ivana Bratic	CC Füssen, Füssen Skip: Daniela Jentsch; Third: Emira Abbes; Second: Analena Jentsch; Lead: Pia-Lisa Schöll; Alternate Josephine Obermann
Italy	Japan	Russia	Scotland	South Korea
CC Dolomiti Fontel, Cortina d'Ampezzo & SC Pinerolo, Pinerolo Skip: Diana Gaspari; Third: Veronica Zappone; Second: Stefania Constantini; Lead: Angela Romei; Alternate: Chiara Olivieri	Yamanashi CA, Yamanashi, Kanagawa CA, Kanagawa & Sapporo Dogin CS, Sapporo Skip: Tori Koana; Third: Yuna Kotani; Second: Mao Ishigaki; Lead: Arisa Kotani; Alternate: Kaho Onodera	CC Adamant, St. Petersburg, Ice Cube & Sochi CC, Sochi Skip: Victoria Moiseeva; Third: Yulia Portunova; Second: Galina Arsenkina; Lead: Julia Guzieva; Alternate: Anna Sidorova	Lochmaben Castle CC, Lockerbie, Carrington CC, Edinburgh, Corrie CC & Leswalt CC, Stranraer & Holywood CC, Dumfries Skip: Hannah Fleming; Third: Jennifer Dodds; Second: Alice Spence; Lead: Vicky Wright; Alternate: Sophie Jackson	Uiseong CC, Uiseong Skip: Kim Eun-jung; Third: Kim Kyeong-ae; Second: Kim Seon-yeong; Lead: Kim Yeong-mi; Alternate: Kim Cho-hi
Sweden	Switzerland	United States		
Sundbybergs CK, Sundbyberg Skip: Anna Hasselborg; Third: Sara McManus; Second: Agnes Knochenhauer; Lead: Sofia Mabergs; Alternate: Jennie Wåhlin	CC Flims, Flims, Grasshopper Club, Zürich, CC Grindelwald, Grindelwald, CC Langenthal, Langenthal & CC Zug, Zug Skip: Binia Feltscher; Third: Irene Schori; Second: Franziska Kaufmann; Lead: Carole Howald; Alternate: Raphaela Keiser	Saint Paul CC, Saint Paul & Fairbanks CC, Fairbanks Skip: Jamie Sinclair; Third: Alexandra Carlson; Second: Vicky Persinger; Lead: Monica Walker; Alternate: Jenna Martin		

== Round-robin standings ==
Final round-robin standings

Key
Teams to Playoffs

Country	Skip	W	L	PF	PA	Ends Won	Ends Lost	Blank Ends	Stolen Ends	Shot Pct.	DSC
Canada	Jennifer Jones	12	0	110	58	55	44	6	14	85%	21.72
Sweden	Anna Hasselborg	10	2	87	59	51	39	16	14	88%	30.32
South Korea	Kim Eun-jung	8	4	91	74	54	48	11	17	82%	43.45
Russia	Victoria Moiseeva	7	5	90	68	52	45	20	15	84%	24.44
Czech Republic	Anna Kubešková	6	6	86	82	47	48	17	8	79%	62.09
United States	Jamie Sinclair	6	6	78	67	52	45	16	14	84%	34.97
China	Jiang Yilun	6	6	76	93	47	52	9	10	77%	61.42
Switzerland	Binia Feltscher	5	7	74	80	50	52	11	11	78%	42.26
Scotland	Hannah Fleming	5	7	75	89	50	49	15	17	77%	59.92
Japan	Tori Koana	5	7	72	82	50	48	12	8	79%	39.62
Denmark	Angelina Jensen	3	9	63	95	43	57	9	10	75%	64.46
Germany	Daniela Jentsch	3	9	59	79	38	51	23	5	77%	68.40
Italy	Diana Gaspari	2	10	66	101	46	57	12	14	76%	49.27

=== WCT ranking ===
Year to date World Curling Tour order of merit ranking for each team prior to the event.

Nation (Skip)	Rank	Points
Canada (Jones)	1	436.06
Sweden (Hasselborg)	2	435.27
South Korea (Kim)	8	251.42
United States (Sinclair)	11	233.94
Switzerland (Feltscher)	15	215.45
Russia (Moiseeva)	19	183.64
Scotland (Fleming)	27	117.05
Czech Republic (Kubešková)	48	69.26
Germany (Jentsch)	54	64.64
Italy (Gaspari)	60	55.19
China (Jiang)	105	23.87
Japan (Koana)	138	12.43
Denmark (Jensen)	161	9.60

== Round-robin results ==
All draw times are listed in Eastern Daylight Time (UTC−4:00).

=== Draw 1 ===
Saturday, March 17, 14:00

Sheet A	1	2	3	4	5	6	7	8	9	10	Final
Switzerland (Feltscher)	0	0	0	0	1	0	2	0	2	0	5
China (Jiang) 🔨	0	0	0	0	0	3	0	2	0	1	6

Sheet B	1	2	3	4	5	6	7	8	9	10	Final
Russia (Moiseeva) 🔨	1	0	2	0	2	0	0	1	0	2	8
Scotland (Fleming)	0	2	0	1	0	1	0	0	0	0	4

Sheet C	1	2	3	4	5	6	7	8	9	10	Final
Czech Republic (Kubešková)	0	0	3	0	1	0	1	X	X	X	5
Canada (Jones) 🔨	4	2	0	4	0	1	0	X	X	X	11

Sheet D	1	2	3	4	5	6	7	8	9	10	Final
South Korea (Kim)	0	0	2	0	4	2	0	X	X	X	8
Germany (Jentsch) 🔨	0	1	0	1	0	0	1	X	X	X	3

=== Draw 2 ===
Saturday, March 17, 19:00

Sheet A	1	2	3	4	5	6	7	8	9	10	Final
Sweden (Hasselborg) 🔨	0	2	1	0	2	2	1	X	X	X	8
Denmark (Jensen)	1	0	0	1	0	0	0	X	X	X	2

Sheet B	1	2	3	4	5	6	7	8	9	10	Final
United States (Sinclair) 🔨	0	0	3	2	1	2	0	X	X	X	8
Italy (Gaspari)	0	0	0	0	0	0	1	X	X	X	1

Sheet C	1	2	3	4	5	6	7	8	9	10	Final
Germany (Jentsch) 🔨	0	0	0	2	0	0	2	0	1	0	5
Japan (Koana)	0	1	1	0	1	0	0	1	0	2	6

Sheet D	1	2	3	4	5	6	7	8	9	10	Final
Switzerland (Feltscher)	0	1	1	0	1	0	1	0	1	0	5
Canada (Jones) 🔨	1	0	0	2	0	1	0	3	0	3	10

=== Draw 3 ===
Sunday, March 18, 09:00

Sheet A	1	2	3	4	5	6	7	8	9	10	Final
South Korea (Kim)	0	1	1	0	1	0	0	1	4	X	8
Czech Republic (Kubešková) 🔨	0	0	0	1	0	0	4	0	0	X	5

Sheet B	1	2	3	4	5	6	7	8	9	10	Final
Sweden (Hasselborg) 🔨	2	0	1	0	2	0	5	X	X	X	10
China (Jiang)	0	1	0	1	0	1	0	X	X	X	3

Sheet C	1	2	3	4	5	6	7	8	9	10	11	Final
Italy (Gaspari) 🔨	0	0	2	0	2	0	0	0	1	1	1	7
Scotland (Fleming)	0	1	0	2	0	1	1	1	0	0	0	6

Sheet D	1	2	3	4	5	6	7	8	9	10	Final
United States (Sinclair)	0	0	0	3	0	0	1	0	1	0	5
Russia (Moiseeva) 🔨	0	2	1	0	1	1	0	1	0	2	8

=== Draw 4 ===
Sunday, March 18, 14:00

Sheet A	1	2	3	4	5	6	7	8	9	10	Final
Scotland (Fleming) 🔨	0	2	0	1	0	1	0	0	2	0	6
United States (Sinclair)	0	0	2	0	3	0	0	1	0	2	8

Sheet B	1	2	3	4	5	6	7	8	9	10	Final
Japan (Koana) 🔨	2	0	1	1	1	0	4	X	X	X	9
Denmark (Jensen)	0	0	0	0	0	2	0	X	X	X	2

Sheet C	1	2	3	4	5	6	7	8	9	10	Final
Russia (Moiseeva) 🔨	0	5	1	0	1	0	0	0	1	X	8
Switzerland (Feltscher)	1	0	0	1	0	0	1	1	0	X	4

Sheet D	1	2	3	4	5	6	7	8	9	10	Final
Italy (Gaspari)	0	0	0	0	0	1	0	X	X	X	1
Sweden (Hasselborg) 🔨	0	1	1	3	3	0	1	X	X	X	9

=== Draw 5 ===
Sunday, March 18, 19:00

Sheet A	1	2	3	4	5	6	7	8	9	10	Final
Japan (Koana) 🔨	1	0	0	2	0	1	0	1	0	1	6
Switzerland (Feltscher)	0	1	2	0	1	0	2	0	1	0	7

Sheet B	1	2	3	4	5	6	7	8	9	10	Final
Germany (Jentsch)	0	0	1	0	0	0	X	X	X	X	1
Canada (Jones) 🔨	2	0	0	0	4	2	X	X	X	X	8

Sheet C	1	2	3	4	5	6	7	8	9	10	Final
Denmark (Jensen)	0	0	0	3	0	1	0	0	1	X	5
South Korea (Kim) 🔨	0	0	1	0	1	0	3	2	0	X	7

Sheet D	1	2	3	4	5	6	7	8	9	10	Final
Czech Republic (Kubešková) 🔨	0	2	0	1	0	4	0	0	3	X	10
China (Jiang)	0	0	1	0	2	0	1	1	0	X	5

=== Draw 6 ===
Monday, March 19, 09:00

Sheet B	1	2	3	4	5	6	7	8	9	10	Final
Italy (Gaspari) 🔨	0	1	0	0	4	0	0	0	0	1	6
Russia (Moiseeva)	0	0	2	2	0	0	0	1	0	0	5

Sheet C	1	2	3	4	5	6	7	8	9	10	Final
Sweden (Hasselborg) 🔨	0	1	2	1	0	0	1	0	1	X	6
United States (Sinclair)	0	0	0	0	2	0	0	2	0	X	4

=== Draw 7 ===
Monday, March 19, 14:00

Sheet A	1	2	3	4	5	6	7	8	9	10	11	Final
Denmark (Jensen) 🔨	0	1	0	1	1	0	1	0	0	1	1	6
Germany (Jentsch)	0	0	2	0	0	1	0	1	1	0	0	5

Sheet B	1	2	3	4	5	6	7	8	9	10	Final
Scotland (Fleming)	0	0	3	0	1	0	0	X	X	X	4
Czech Republic (Kubešková) 🔨	4	2	0	1	0	3	1	X	X	X	11

Sheet C	1	2	3	4	5	6	7	8	9	10	Final
Canada (Jones)	0	1	0	0	1	3	0	0	2	2	9
China (Jiang) 🔨	1	0	2	0	0	0	1	1	0	0	5

Sheet D	1	2	3	4	5	6	7	8	9	10	11	Final
Japan (Koana)	0	0	4	0	0	0	1	0	1	0	1	7
United States (Sinclair) 🔨	1	0	0	2	0	0	0	1	0	2	0	6

=== Draw 8 ===
Monday, March 19, 19:00

Sheet A	1	2	3	4	5	6	7	8	9	10	Final
China (Jiang)	0	0	1	1	0	1	0	1	0	4	8
Russia (Moiseeva) 🔨	0	2	0	0	1	0	2	0	2	0	7

Sheet B	1	2	3	4	5	6	7	8	9	10	Final
South Korea (Kim) 🔨	0	0	0	2	0	2	0	2	0	1	7
Sweden (Hasselborg)	3	0	2	0	1	0	2	0	1	0	9

Sheet C	1	2	3	4	5	6	7	8	9	10	11	Final
Czech Republic (Kubešková) 🔨	1	0	2	0	0	2	1	1	0	0	4	11
Italy (Gaspari)	0	2	0	1	2	0	0	0	1	1	0	7

Sheet D	1	2	3	4	5	6	7	8	9	10	Final
Scotland (Fleming) 🔨	0	1	0	0	0	1	0	X	X	X	2
Switzerland (Feltscher)	0	0	3	0	3	0	4	X	X	X	10

=== Draw 9 ===
Tuesday, March 20, 09:00

Sheet A	1	2	3	4	5	6	7	8	9	10	11	Final
Italy (Gaspari)	0	1	0	0	0	1	1	2	1	1	0	7
South Korea (Kim) 🔨	2	0	3	0	2	0	0	0	0	0	1	8

Sheet B	1	2	3	4	5	6	7	8	9	10	Final
China (Jiang)	1	0	3	0	3	0	4	X	X	X	11
Japan (Koana) 🔨	0	2	0	1	0	1	0	X	X	X	4

Sheet C	1	2	3	4	5	6	7	8	9	10	Final
Scotland (Fleming)	0	2	1	1	3	0	0	1	0	X	8
Germany (Jentsch) 🔨	2	0	0	0	0	0	1	0	2	X	5

Sheet D	1	2	3	4	5	6	7	8	9	10	Final
Canada (Jones) 🔨	2	0	0	2	0	2	0	4	X	X	10
Denmark (Jensen)	0	1	1	0	2	0	1	0	X	X	5

=== Draw 10 ===
Tuesday, March 20, 14:00

Sheet A	1	2	3	4	5	6	7	8	9	10	Final
Czech Republic (Kubešková)	0	0	0	0	2	0	2	0	2	X	6
Sweden (Hasselborg) 🔨	0	0	2	3	0	1	0	2	0	X	8

Sheet B	1	2	3	4	5	6	7	8	9	10	Final
United States (Sinclair) 🔨	1	0	2	1	0	1	0	2	0	X	7
Switzerland (Feltscher)	0	1	0	0	2	0	1	0	1	X	5

Sheet C	1	2	3	4	5	6	7	8	9	10	Final
Japan (Koana) 🔨	0	0	0	1	0	0	2	0	1	X	4
Russia (Moiseeva)	0	1	2	0	2	0	0	2	0	X	7

Sheet D	1	2	3	4	5	6	7	8	9	10	11	Final
Germany (Jentsch)	0	0	1	2	0	0	2	0	2	0	3	10
Italy (Gaspari) 🔨	1	1	0	0	0	1	0	2	0	2	0	7

=== Draw 11 ===
Tuesday, March 20, 19:00

Sheet A	1	2	3	4	5	6	7	8	9	10	Final
Canada (Jones) 🔨	1	2	0	1	0	0	3	0	0	1	8
Scotland (Fleming)	0	0	2	0	3	1	0	0	0	0	6

Sheet B	1	2	3	4	5	6	7	8	9	10	11	Final
Czech Republic (Kubešková)	0	1	0	0	1	1	0	2	0	3	1	9
Denmark (Jensen) 🔨	1	0	4	0	0	0	2	0	1	0	0	8

Sheet C	1	2	3	4	5	6	7	8	9	10	Final
Switzerland (Feltscher) 🔨	0	0	1	1	0	0	1	0	1	0	4
Sweden (Hasselborg)	0	0	0	0	1	1	0	1	0	2	5

Sheet D	1	2	3	4	5	6	7	8	9	10	Final
China (Jiang)	0	0	1	2	0	0	X	X	X	X	3
South Korea (Kim) 🔨	5	3	0	0	2	2	X	X	X	X	12

=== Draw 12 ===
Wednesday, March 21, 09:00

Sheet A	1	2	3	4	5	6	7	8	9	10	Final
Switzerland (Feltscher) 🔨	0	1	0	0	0	2	2	1	0	1	7
Denmark (Jensen)	1	0	1	1	1	0	0	0	1	0	5

Sheet B	1	2	3	4	5	6	7	8	9	10	Final
Sweden (Hasselborg) 🔨	0	2	0	2	2	0	2	0	0	X	8
Germany (Jentsch)	0	0	1	0	0	2	0	0	1	X	4

Sheet C	1	2	3	4	5	6	7	8	9	10	11	Final
United States (Sinclair)	0	1	0	2	0	1	2	0	2	0	0	8
South Korea (Kim) 🔨	1	0	3	0	1	0	0	1	0	2	1	9

Sheet D	1	2	3	4	5	6	7	8	9	10	Final
Scotland (Fleming) 🔨	2	0	2	1	1	0	1	3	0	X	10
Japan (Koana)	0	2	0	0	0	3	0	0	2	X	7

=== Draw 13 ===
Wednesday, March 21, 14:00

Sheet A	1	2	3	4	5	6	7	8	9	10	Final
United States (Sinclair) 🔨	0	2	0	1	1	1	0	1	0	2	8
China (Jiang)	0	0	1	0	0	0	2	0	1	0	4

Sheet B	1	2	3	4	5	6	7	8	9	10	Final
Canada (Jones) 🔨	0	1	0	2	0	0	2	1	2	X	8
South Korea (Kim)	1	0	1	0	1	1	0	0	0	X	4

Sheet C	1	2	3	4	5	6	7	8	9	10	Final
Italy (Gaspari)	0	1	3	0	0	0	1	0	2	0	7
Denmark (Jensen) 🔨	1	0	0	0	2	3	0	1	0	1	8

Sheet D	1	2	3	4	5	6	7	8	9	10	Final
Russia (Moiseeva) 🔨	2	0	2	0	0	2	0	3	0	X	9
Czech Republic (Kubešková)	0	2	0	2	0	0	1	0	0	X	5

=== Draw 14 ===
Wednesday, March 21, 19:00

Sheet A	1	2	3	4	5	6	7	8	9	10	Final
Russia (Moiseeva)	0	0	1	1	0	0	0	0	4	X	6
Germany (Jentsch) 🔨	0	1	0	0	0	0	1	0	0	X	2

Sheet B	1	2	3	4	5	6	7	8	9	10	Final
Japan (Koana)	0	2	0	1	0	4	0	0	0	1	8
Italy (Gaspari) 🔨	1	0	0	0	1	0	2	1	1	0	6

Sheet C	1	2	3	4	5	6	7	8	9	10	Final
China (Jiang) 🔨	0	0	3	0	0	1	2	0	1	0	7
Scotland (Fleming)	1	1	0	1	3	0	0	1	0	1	8

Sheet D	1	2	3	4	5	6	7	8	9	10	Final
Sweden (Hasselborg)	0	0	1	0	0	2	0	1	X	X	4
Canada (Jones) 🔨	1	1	0	1	2	0	3	0	X	X	8

=== Draw 15 ===
Thursday, March 22, 09:00

Sheet A	1	2	3	4	5	6	7	8	9	10	Final
Sweden (Hasselborg)	0	0	0	1	0	3	0	2	0	X	6
Japan (Koana) 🔨	1	0	0	0	1	0	1	0	1	X	4

Sheet B	1	2	3	4	5	6	7	8	9	10	Final
Switzerland (Feltscher) 🔨	1	0	0	1	0	1	0	3	0	0	6
Czech Republic (Kubešková)	0	0	1	0	3	0	1	0	3	1	9

Sheet C	1	2	3	4	5	6	7	8	9	10	Final
Russia (Moiseeva)	0	1	0	1	1	0	3	0	1	0	7
Canada (Jones) 🔨	1	0	2	0	0	3	0	1	0	1	8

Sheet D	1	2	3	4	5	6	7	8	9	10	Final
Denmark (Jensen)	2	0	1	0	2	0	0	1	0	2	8
Scotland (Fleming) 🔨	0	2	0	1	0	1	1	0	2	0	7

=== Draw 16 ===
Thursday, March 22, 14:00

Sheet A	1	2	3	4	5	6	7	8	9	10	Final
China (Jiang)	0	1	0	3	0	1	0	1	1	X	7
Italy (Gaspari) 🔨	2	0	1	0	1	0	1	0	0	X	5

Sheet B	1	2	3	4	5	6	7	8	9	10	Final
Denmark (Jensen)	0	0	0	0	0	0	0	X	X	X	0
United States (Sinclair) 🔨	0	0	2	1	1	1	1	X	X	X	6

Sheet C	1	2	3	4	5	6	7	8	9	10	11	Final
Germany (Jentsch)	0	0	1	0	0	0	0	0	0	1	1	3
Czech Republic (Kubešková) 🔨	1	0	0	0	0	0	0	1	0	0	0	2

Sheet D	1	2	3	4	5	6	7	8	9	10	Final
Switzerland (Feltscher) 🔨	3	0	0	0	0	0	1	0	2	2	8
South Korea (Kim)	0	1	1	1	0	2	0	1	0	0	6

=== Draw 17 ===
Thursday, March 22, 19:00

Sheet A	1	2	3	4	5	6	7	8	9	10	Final
Germany (Jentsch) 🔨	0	2	0	2	0	0	0	1	0	X	5
United States (Sinclair)	0	0	1	0	1	2	1	0	2	X	7

Sheet B	1	2	3	4	5	6	7	8	9	10	11	Final
Russia (Moiseeva)	0	0	3	0	2	0	1	0	2	0	0	8
Sweden (Hasselborg) 🔨	0	1	0	2	0	2	0	1	0	2	1	9

Sheet C	1	2	3	4	5	6	7	8	9	10	Final
South Korea (Kim)	3	0	1	0	2	0	1	0	2	X	9
Japan (Koana) 🔨	0	1	0	2	0	1	0	1	0	X	5

Sheet D	1	2	3	4	5	6	7	8	9	10	Final
Canada (Jones) 🔨	2	0	1	2	3	2	0	4	X	X	14
Italy (Gaspari)	0	3	0	0	0	0	3	0	X	X	6

=== Draw 18 ===
Friday, March 23, 09:00

Sheet A	1	2	3	4	5	6	7	8	9	10	Final
Japan (Koana) 🔨	0	1	0	1	0	0	1	1	1	X	5
Canada (Jones)	1	0	3	0	2	2	0	0	0	X	8

Sheet B	1	2	3	4	5	6	7	8	9	10	Final
Germany (Jentsch)	0	2	2	0	0	3	0	3	0	X	10
Switzerland (Feltscher) 🔨	1	0	0	0	3	0	1	0	1	X	6

Sheet C	1	2	3	4	5	6	7	8	9	10	Final
Denmark (Jensen) 🔨	3	0	1	0	1	0	1	0	2	1	9
China (Jiang)	0	3	0	1	0	2	0	4	0	0	10

Sheet D	1	2	3	4	5	6	7	8	9	10	Final
United States (Sinclair) 🔨	0	2	0	1	0	1	0	2	0	0	6
Czech Republic (Kubešková)	0	0	2	0	2	0	1	0	1	2	8

=== Draw 19 ===
Friday, March 23, 14:00

Sheet A	1	2	3	4	5	6	7	8	9	10	Final
Italy (Gaspari) 🔨	0	1	0	0	1	1	2	0	1	0	6
Switzerland (Feltscher)	1	0	1	1	0	0	0	3	0	1	7

Sheet B	1	2	3	4	5	6	7	8	9	10	Final
Czech Republic (Plíšková)	0	2	0	1	0	1	0	1	0	0	5
Japan (Koana) 🔨	1	0	2	0	2	0	1	0	0	1	7

Sheet C	1	2	3	4	5	6	7	8	9	10	Final
Scotland (Fleming)	1	3	0	0	2	0	0	0	0	2	8
Sweden (Hasselborg) 🔨	0	0	0	2	0	0	2	0	1	0	5

Sheet D	1	2	3	4	5	6	7	8	9	10	11	Final
South Korea (Kim) 🔨	0	0	0	1	0	0	2	1	1	2	1	8
Russia (Moiseeva)	0	1	1	0	3	2	0	0	0	0	0	7

=== Draw 20 ===
Friday, March 23, 19:00

Sheet A	1	2	3	4	5	6	7	8	9	10	Final
Denmark (Jensen)	0	0	2	0	0	0	3	0	0	X	5
Russia (Moiseeva) 🔨	0	1	0	1	2	2	0	2	2	X	10

Sheet B	1	2	3	4	5	6	7	8	9	10	11	Final
South Korea (Kim) 🔨	0	1	0	2	0	0	0	0	1	1	0	5
Scotland (Fleming)	0	0	1	0	0	2	1	1	0	0	1	6

Sheet C	1	2	3	4	5	6	7	8	9	10	Final
Canada (Jones)	0	3	0	0	1	0	0	3	0	1	8
United States (Sinclair) 🔨	1	0	1	0	0	1	1	0	1	0	5

Sheet D	1	2	3	4	5	6	7	8	9	10	Final
China (Jiang) 🔨	1	1	1	1	0	0	0	2	0	1	7
Germany (Jentsch)	0	0	0	0	0	2	3	0	1	0	6

== Playoffs ==
Qualification games
3	South Korea	3
6	United States	10
4	Russia	7
5	Czech Republic	3

Semifinals
1	Canada	9
6	United States	7
2	Sweden	7
4	Russia	6

Final
1	Canada	7
2	Sweden	6
Bronze medal game
6	United States	5
4	Russia	6

=== Qualification games ===
Saturday, March 24, 09:00

Sheet A	1	2	3	4	5	6	7	8	9	10	Final
South Korea (Kim) 🔨	1	0	0	1	0	0	0	1	0	X	3
United States (Sinclair)	0	1	0	0	1	0	1	0	7	X	10

Player percentages
South Korea		United States	
Kim Yeong-mi	78%	Monica Walker	83%
Kim Seon-yeong	82%	Vicky Persinger	90%
Kim Kyeong-ae	69%	Alex Carlson	79%
Kim Eun-jung	79%	Jamie Sinclair	93%
Total	77%	Total	86%

Sheet C	1	2	3	4	5	6	7	8	9	10	Final
Russia (Moiseeva) 🔨	0	0	0	2	1	0	2	1	1	X	7
Czech Republic (Kubešková)	0	0	0	0	0	3	0	0	0	X	3

Player percentages
Russia		Czech Republic	
Julia Guzieva	95%	Klára Svatoňová	94%
Galina Arsenkina	85%	Tereza Plíšková	84%
Julia Portunova	74%	Alžběta Baudyšová	78%
Victoria Moiseeva	75%	Anna Kubešková	65%
Total	82%	Total	80%

=== Semifinal 1 ===
Saturday, March 24, 14:00

Sheet B	1	2	3	4	5	6	7	8	9	10	Final
Sweden (Hasselborg) 🔨	2	0	0	1	0	2	0	2	0	0	7
Russia (Moiseeva)	0	2	0	0	0	0	1	0	2	1	6

Player percentages
Sweden		Russia	
Sofia Mabergs	91%	Julia Guzieva	96%
Agnes Knochenhauer	95%	Galina Arsenkina	80%
Sara McManus	89%	Julia Portunova	80%
Anna Hasselborg	84%	Victoria Moiseeva	73%
Total	90%	Total	82%

=== Semifinal 2 ===
Saturday, March 24, 19:00

Sheet B	1	2	3	4	5	6	7	8	9	10	Final
Canada (Jones) 🔨	3	0	2	0	1	0	1	0	0	2	9
United States (Sinclair)	0	1	0	1	0	2	0	2	1	0	7

Player percentages
Canada		United States	
Dawn McEwen	89%	Monica Walker	99%
Jill Officer	88%	Vicky Persinger	89%
Kaitlyn Lawes	86%	Alex Carlson	66%
Jennifer Jones	79%	Jamie Sinclair	69%
Total	86%	Total	81%

=== Bronze medal game ===
Sunday, March 25, 10:00

Sheet B	1	2	3	4	5	6	7	8	9	10	Final
United States (Sinclair)	0	1	0	0	1	1	0	0	2	0	5
Russia (Moiseeva) 🔨	0	0	2	0	0	0	0	2	0	2	6

Player percentages
United States		Russia	
Monica Walker	88%	Julia Guzieva	94%
Vicky Persinger	86%	Galina Arsenkina	95%
Alex Carlson	90%	Julia Portunova	84%
Jamie Sinclair	82%	Victoria Moiseeva	78%
Total	87%	Total	88%

=== Gold medal game ===
Sunday, March 25, 15:00

Sheet B	1	2	3	4	5	6	7	8	9	10	11	Final
Canada (Jones) 🔨	0	0	0	2	0	2	0	0	2	0	1	7
Sweden (Hasselborg)	0	0	0	0	3	0	1	0	0	2	0	6

Player percentages
Canada		Sweden	
Dawn McEwen	81%	Sofia Mabergs	93%
Jill Officer	69%	Agnes Knochenhauer	83%
Kaitlyn Lawes	86%	Sara McManus	76%
Jennifer Jones	79%	Anna Hasselborg	82%
Total	79%	Total	84%

== Statistics ==
=== Top 5 player percentages ===
After round robin; minimum 5 games

Leads	%
(Sweden) Sofia Mabergs	91
(United States) Monica Walker	88
(South Korea) Kim Yeong-mi	87
(Canada) Dawn McEwen	86
(Czech Republic) Klára Svatoňová	86

Seconds	%
(Russia) Galina Arsenkina	90
(Sweden) Agnes Knochenhauer	90
(Canada) Jill Officer	86
(United States) Vicky Persinger	86
(South Korea) Kim Seon-yeong	84

Thirds	%
(Sweden) Sara McManus	88
(Canada) Kaitlyn Lawes	86
(United States) Alex Carlson	83
(South Korea) Kim Kyeong-ae	82
(Russia) Julia Portunova	82

Skips	%
(Sweden) Anna Hasselborg	85
(Russia) Victoria Moiseeva	82
(United States) Jamie Sinclair	81
(Canada) Jennifer Jones	80
(Czech Republic) Anna Kubešková	78

=== Perfect games ===
Player	Team	Position	Opponent
Ezhen Kolchevskaia	Czech Republic	Lead	Sweden
Kim Yeong-mi	South Korea	Lead	China
Sofia Mabergs	Sweden	Lead	Germany
Jill Officer	Canada	Second	Czech Republic
Alex Carlson	United States	Third	Italy

== Awards ==
The awards and all-star team are as follows:

All-Star Team

- Skip: Anna Hasselborg, Sweden
- Third: Sara McManus, Sweden
- Second: Galina Arsenkina, Russia
- Lead: Sofia Mabergs, Sweden

Frances Brodie Sportsmanship Award

- Jill Officer, Canada
