= Jason Knapp (sportscaster) =

American sportscaster

Jason Knapp is an American sportscaster for the CBS Sports Network, Pac-12 Network and NBC Sports.

== Education ==
Knapp graduated from Syracuse University's S. I. Newhouse School of Public Communications in 1991. At Syracuse, he was on WAER radio staff, where he did play-by-play and color commentary for various university teams.

== Career ==
He was the sports director for WBRE-TV until 2006. He made his Olympic debut on NBC Sports's coverage of the 2012 London Olympics, calling wrestling, shooting, and archery. For CBS Sports Network, he served as a play-by-play, sideline reporter, and host for the network's coverage of college football, college basketball, high school basketball, college wrestling, college baseball, college field hockey, college rugby, college water polo, college swimming, gymnastics, lacrosse, volleyball, and soccer. He is also a commentator for the NBA D-League games on the CBS Sports Network. In April 2012 Knapp called the Chesapeake Bayhawks-Long Island Lizards game.

Knapp was hired by NBC Sports to work as a curling announcer during the 2014 Winter Olympics. He has continued to provide curling commentary on Curling Night in America, a NBCSN program that broadcasts a made-for-television curling competition.

Knapp was also the play-by-play voice for the 2014 NAIA Division I Women's Basketball Championship Game for ESPN3.

In 2021, Knapp handled his fifth assignment for NBC Olympics for the 2020 Tokyo Olympics.

Knapp, on his eight Olympics assignment, called for curling for the fourth time in the 2026 Winter Olympics.

== Personal life ==
Knapp is a native of Medford, New Jersey. He currently resides in Clarks Summit, Pennsylvania.
