= Kenji Tomabechi =

Japanese curler

- Curler ♂
- Born: 19 June 1978 (age 48)

Team
- Curling club: Team Iwate
- Mixed doubles partner: Michiko Tomabechi

Curling career
- Member Association: Japan
- World Mixed Doubles Championship: 4 (2008, 2011, 2012, 2015)
Medal record
Japan Mixed Doubles Championship
Gold medal – first place	2007 Tokoro
Gold medal – first place	2011 Karuizawa
Gold medal – first place	2012 Tokoro
Gold medal – first place	2015 Karuizawa
Silver medal – second place	2009 Aomori
Bronze medal – third place	2008 Karuizawa

Kenji Tomabechi (苫米地 賢司; born 19 June, 1978) is a Japanese curler.

At the national level, he is a four-time Japan mixed doubles champion curler (2007, 2011, 2012, 2015).

== Teams and events ==
=== Men's ===
Season	Skip	Third	Second	Lead	Events
2020–21	Kenji Tomabechi	Eiwa Matsubara	Tadashi Sato	Mitsuru Kikuchi	JMCC 2021 (7th)

=== Mixed doubles ===
Season	Male	Female	Coach	Events
2007–08	Michiko Taira	Kenji Tomabechi		JMDCC 2007 (gold); WMD 2008 (13th)
2008–09	Michiko Tomabechi	Kenji Tomabechi		JMDCC 2008 (bronze)
2009–10	Michiko Tomabechi	Kenji Tomabechi		JMDCC 2009 (silver)
2010–11	Michiko Tomabechi	Kenji Tomabechi	Akira Takada (WMDCC)	JMDCC 2011 (gold); WMDCC 2011 (7th)
2011–12	Michiko Tomabechi	Kenji Tomabechi	Akira Takada (WMDCC)	JMDCC 2012 (gold); WMDCC 2012 (15th)
2014–15	Michiko Tomabechi	Kenji Tomabechi	Akira Takada (WMDCC)	JMDCC 2015 (gold); WMDCC 2015 (10th)
2020–21	Michiko Tomabechi	Kenji Tomabechi	Yoshito Nakamura	JMDCC 2021 (10th)

== Personal life ==
His wife, Michiko Tomabechi is also a competitive curler. Together, they are four time national mixed doubles champions, and they have played four times in the World Mixed Doubles Curling Championship for Japan.
