= Tori Koana =

Japanese curler (born 1995)

- Curler
- Born: May 25, 1995 (age 31); Kōfu, Yamanashi, Japan

Team
- Mixed doubles partner: Go Aoki

Curling career
- Member Association: Japan
- World Championship: 2 (2018, 2026)
- World Mixed Doubles Championship: 2 (2026, 2027)
- Other appearances: Asian Winter Games: 1 (2025)
Medal record
Representing Japan
Asian Winter Games
Gold medal – first place	2025 Harbin	Mixed doubles
Japanese Women's Championship
Gold medal – first place	2018 Hokkaido
Silver medal – second place	2016 Aomori
Bronze medal – third place	2015 Karuizawa
Bronze medal – third place	2017 Karuizawa

Tori Koana (小穴 桃里, Koana Tōri) is a Japanese curler. She was the skip of Team Fujikyu, and now focuses on mixed doubles with curling partner Go Aoki

== Career ==
=== Women ===
Koana found success in women's curling during the 2017–2018 season, where she would skip her team to a gold medal at the 2018 Japan Women's Curling Championships. This win qualified the Koana rink to represent Japan at the 2018 Ford World Women's Curling Championship finishing in 10th. She also represented Japan at the third leg of the 2018–19 Curling World Cup, finishing with a 2–4 record.

To begin the 2019-20 curling season, Koana won the Morioka City Women's Memorial Cup and finished runner-up at the 2019 Cargill Curling Training Centre Icebreaker. The Koana rink was unable to win another Japanese Women's title, finishing 4th at the 2020 and 2021. Koana later decided to become an alternate on the team, that would now be skipped by Yuna Kotani for the 2021-22 curling season, where they finished in 8th at the 2022 Japan Curling Championships.

=== Mixed doubles ===
Koana started curling with Go Aoki in mixed doubles in 2021, where they found success, finishing third at the 2021 Japan Mixed Doubles Curling Championship. Koana and Aoki would then start to focus on solely on mixed doubles curling, where they would continue to find success nationally, finishing second at the 2023 and 2025 national championships, as well as winning multiple events on the world mixed doubles tour. Koana and Aoki first represented Japan in mixed doubles at the 2025 Asian Winter Games, where they won the gold medal, beating South Korea 7–6 in the final.

Koana and Aoki would win their first mixed doubles national title at the 2025 Japanese Olympic mixed doubles curling trials, defeating both the 2024 (Miyu Ueno & Tsuyoshi Yamaguchi) and 2025 (Chiaki Matsumura & Yasumasa Tanida) Japanese mixed doubles champions. This gave Koana and Aoki the right to represent Japan at the Olympic Qualification Event where they will need to finish in the top two to qualify for the 2026 Winter Olympics in Cortina d'Ampezzo, Italy.

== Personal life ==
Koana worked as an amusement park employee for Fujikyu Highland Co., Ltd. until 2022. She currently works as an office manager and is married.

== Teams ==
Season	Skip	Third	Second	Lead	Alternate	Events
2013–14	Junko Nishimuro (Fourth)	Tori Koana (Skip)	Misato Yanagisawa	Riko Toyoda		
2014–15	Junko Nishimuro (Fourth)	Misato Yanagisawa	Tori Koana (Skip)	Riko Toyoda	Yuna Kotani	
2015–16	Junko Nishimuro (Fourth)	Misato Yanagisawa	Tori Koana (Skip)	Yuna Kotani	Riko Toyoda	
2016–17	Junko Nishimuro (Fourth)	Tori Koana (Skip)	Yuna Kotani	Mao Ishigaki	Kyoka Kuramitsu	
2017–18	Tori Koana	Yuna Kotani	Mao Ishigaki	Arisa Kotani	Kaho Onodera	WWCC 2018 (10th)
2018–19	Tori Koana	Junko Nishimuro	Mao Ishigaki	Arisa Kotani	Yuna Kotani	CWC (6th)
2019–20	Tori Koana	Yuna Kotani	Mao Ishigaki	Arisa Kotani		
2020–21	Tori Koana	Yuna Kotani	Mao Ishigaki	Arisa Kotani		
2021–22	Yuna Kotani	Arisa Kotani	Mao Ishigaki	Michiko Tomabechi	Tori Koana	

== Grand Slam record ==
Key
C	Champion
F	Lost in Final
SF	Lost in Semifinal
QF	Lost in Quarterfinals
R16	Lost in the round of 16
Q	Did not advance to playoffs
T2	Played in Tier 2 event
DNP	Did not participate in event
N/A	Not a Grand Slam event that season

Event	2021–22
Masters	Q
