= Michiko Tomabechi =

Japanese curler

- Curler ♀
- Born: Michiko Taira; 29 January 1980 (age 46); Ninohe, Iwate

Team
- Mixed doubles partner: Kenji Tomabechi

Curling career
- Member Association: Japan
- World Mixed Doubles Championship: 4 (2008, 2011, 2012, 2015)
- Pacific-Asia Championship: 1 (2013)
- Olympic: 1 (2014)
Medal record
Women's Curling
Representing Japan
Pacific-Asia Championship
Bronze medal – third place	2013 Shanghai	Team

Michiko Tomabechi (born 29 January 1980) is a Japanese curler.

== Career ==
Tomabechi competed at the 2014 Winter Olympics in Sochi, with the Japanese team.

In 2013, she was part of the bronze-winning team at the Pacific-Asia Championship in Shanghai.

Her husband, Kenji Tomabechi is also a competitive curler, they had become the national champion four times in mixed doubles, and they have played four times in the World Mixed Doubles Curling Championship as Japan representatives.
