= Arisa Kotani =

Japanese curler

- Curler
- Born: November 5, 2000 (age 26)

Team
- Skip: Tori Koana
- Third: Yuna Kotani
- Second: Mao Ishigaki
- Lead: Arisa Kotani

Curling career
- Member Association: Japan
- World Championship: 1 (2018)
Medal record
Curling
Japan Women's Championship
| Gold medal – first place | 2018 Nayoro |

Arisa Kotani (小谷 有理沙, Kotani Arisa; born November 5, 2000) is a Japanese female curler.

At the national level she is a 2018 Japan women's champion.

== Teams ==
| Season | Skip | Third | Second | Lead | Alternate | Coach | Events |
|---|---|---|---|---|---|---|---|
| 2017–18 | Junko Nishimuro (fourth) | Tori Koana (skip) | Yuna Kotani | Mao Ishigaki | Arisa Kotani | | |
| 2017–18 | Tori Koana | Yuna Kotani | Mao Ishigaki | Arisa Kotani | Junko Nishimuro (JWCC); Kaho Onodera (WCC) | J. D. Lind (WCC); Yuji Nishimuro (WCC) | JWCC 2018 (gold); WCC 2018 (10th) |
| 2018–19 | Tori Koana | Junko Nishimuro | Mao Ishigaki | Arisa Kotani | Yuna Kotani | Yuji Nishimuro | CWC/3 (6th); JWCC 2019 (4th) |
| 2019–20 | Tori Koana | Yuna Kotani | Mao Ishigaki | Arisa Kotani | | | |
| 2020–21 | Tori Koana | Yuna Kotani | Mao Ishigaki | Arisa Kotani | | Jim Cotter | |
| 2021–22 | Tori Koana | Yuna Kotani | Mao Ishigaki | Arisa Kotani | | | |

== Personal life ==
Her older sister Yuna Kotani is also a curler. They played together on the 2018 World Women's Curling Championship.
