= Mao Ishigaki =

Japanese curler (born 1991)

- Curler
- Born: 石垣真央; November 26, 1991 (age 34); Kitami, Hokkaido, Japan

Team
- Curling club: GRANDIR, Tokyo, Japan
- Skip: Yui Ozeki
- Third: Mao Ishigaki
- Second: Reika Tateda
- Lead: Hinako Sonobe

Curling career
- Member Association: Japan
- World Championship: 1 (2018)
Medal record
Curling
Representing Japan
World Junior Curling Championships
Bronze medal – third place	2013 Sochi
Pacific-Asia Junior Curling Championships
Gold medal – first place	2011 Naseby
Gold medal – first place	2012 Jeonju City
Gold medal – first place	2013 Tokoro

Mao Ishigaki (石垣 真央, Ishigaki Mao; born 26 November 1991 in Kitami, Hokkaido) is a Japanese curler from Fujiyoshida.

== Career ==
=== Juniors ===
Ishigaki played lead for the Japanese junior women's team (skipped by Sayaka Yoshimura) from 2011 to 2013 winning three straight Pacific-Asia Junior Curling Championships in the process. The team finished in 8th place at the 2011 World Junior Curling Championships, 5th place at the 2012 World Junior Curling Championships and won a bronze medal at the 2013 World Junior Curling Championships. The team also played in two Winter Universiades while Ishigaki was attending Sapporo International University. The team places fourth in 2011 and 7th in 2013.

=== Women's ===
Ishigaki joined the Tori Koana rink in 2016, playing lead for the team. They would represent Japan at the 2018 Ford World Women's Curling Championship, with Ishigaki playing second on the team.

To begin the 2019-20 curling season, Ishigaki and her team won the Morioka City Women's Memorial Cup and finished runner-up at the 2019 Cargill Curling Training Centre Icebreaker.

2023, Ishigaki is a founding member of team GRANDIR in Tokyo.

== Teams ==
Season	Skip	Third	Second	Lead	Alternate	Events
2010–11	Sayaka Yoshimura	Rina Ida	Risa Ujihara	Mao Ishigaki		
2011–12	Sayaka Yoshimura	Rina Ida	Risa Ujihara	Mao Ishigaki		
2012–13	Sayaka Yoshimura	Rina Ida	Risa Ujihara	Mao Ishigaki		
2013–14	Sayaka Yoshimura	Rina Ida	Risa Ujihara	Mao Ishigaki		
2014–15	Yumie Funayama	Kotomi Ishizaki	Mao Ishigaki	Natsuko Ishiyama		
2015–16	Rina Ida	Tamami Naito	Mao Ishigaki	Natsuko Ishiyama		
2016–17	Junko Nishimuro (fourth)	Tori Koana (skip)	Yuna Kotani	Mao Ishigaki	Kyoka Kuramitsu	
2017–18	Tori Koana	Yuna Kotani	Mao Ishigaki	Arisa Kotani	Junko Nishimuro / Kaho Onodera	WWCC 2018 (10th)
2018–19	Tori Koana	Junko Nishimuro	Mao Ishigaki	Arisa Kotani	Yuna Kotani	CWC (6th)
2019–20	Tori Koana	Yuna Kotani	Mao Ishigaki	Arisa Kotani		
2020–21	Tori Koana	Yuna Kotani	Mao Ishigaki	Arisa Kotani		
2021–22	Tori Koana	Yuna Kotani	Mao Ishigaki	Arisa Kotani		
2023-24	Yui Ozeki	Mao Ishigaki	Reika Tateda	Hinako Sonobe	Haruka Hosoda	

== Personal life ==
Ishigaki works as an amusement park employee for Fujikyu Highland Co. Ltd.
