= 2007 Pacific Curling Championships =

- Host city: Beijing, China
- Arena: C.S.O. Curling Club
- Dates: November 19–24
- Men's winner: China
- Skip: Wang Fengchun
- Third: Xu Xiaoming
- Second: Liu Rui
- Lead: Zhang Zhipeng
- Finalist: Australia (Hugh Millikin)
- Women's winner: China
- Skip: Wang Bingyu
- Third: Yue Qingshuang
- Second: Liu Yin
- Lead: Zhou Yan
- Alternate: Liu Jinli
- Finalist: Japan (Moe Meguro)

The 2007 Pacific Curling Championships were held from November 19 to 24 at the C.S.O. Curling Club in Huairou, Beijing, China. The top 2 teams in each gender qualified for the 2007 World Curling Championships.

== Men's ==
=== Teams ===
Australia	China	Chinese Taipei
Fourth: Ian Palangio Skip: Hugh Millikin; Second: Sean Hall; Lead: Stephen Johns	Skip: Wang Fengchun Third: Xu Xiaoming; Second: Liu Rui; Lead: Zhang Zhipeng	Skip: Nicholas Hsu Third: Brendon Liu; Second: Richard Lan; Lead: Ian Lu
Japan	South Korea	New Zealand
Skip: Yusuke Morozumi Third: Tetsuro Shimizu; Second: Tsuyoshi Yamaguchi; Lead: Kosuke Morozumi	Skip: Lee Han-sol Third: Jeon Hee-jin; Second: Shin Bong-yuk; Lead: Cho Wang-sik	Skip: Sean Becker Third: Scott Becker; Second: Rupert Jones; Lead: Warren Dobson

=== Round-robin standings ===
Country	Skip	W	L
New Zealand	Sean Becker	4	1
Japan	Yusuke Morozumi	4	1
China	Wang Fengchun	3	2
Australia	Hugh Millikin	3	2
South Korea	Lee Han-sol	1	4
Chinese Taipei	Nicolas Hsu	0	6

=== Round-robin results ===
==== Draw 1 ====
Monday, November 19, 15:00

Sheet A	1	2	3	4	5	6	7	8	9	10	Final
New Zealand (Becker) 🔨	1	0	1	2	1	0	0	1	0	0	6
South Korea (Lee)	0	1	0	0	0	0	2	0	1	1	5

Sheet B	1	2	3	4	5	6	7	8	9	10	Final
Australia (Millikin)	0	0	1	1	0	1	0	1	0	0	4
China (Wang) 🔨	1	0	0	0	2	0	1	0	0	1	5

Sheet C	1	2	3	4	5	6	7	8	9	10	Final
Japan (Morozumi)	1	0	1	0	4	0	1	0	4	X	11
Chinese Taipei (Shen) 🔨	0	1	0	1	0	1	0	1	0	X	4

==== Draw 2 ====
Tuesday, November 20, 9:00

Sheet A	1	2	3	4	5	6	7	8	9	10	Final
Australia (Millikin) 🔨	3	2	0	2	0	4	X	X	X	X	11
Chinese Taipei (Shen)	0	0	2	0	2	0	X	X	X	X	4

Sheet B	1	2	3	4	5	6	7	8	9	10	Final
Japan (Morozumi)	0	0	1	0	2	0	1	0	X	X	4
New Zealand (Becker) 🔨	0	3	0	2	0	2	0	3	X	X	10

Sheet C	1	2	3	4	5	6	7	8	9	10	Final
South Korea (Lee)	0	0	1	0	1	0	1	0	X	X	3
China (Wang) 🔨	0	3	0	1	0	2	0	6	X	X	12

==== Draw 3 ====
Tuesday, November 20, 15:00

Sheet B	1	2	3	4	5	6	7	8	9	10	Final
South Korea (Lee) 🔨	0	3	0	0	1	0	3	0	2	1	10
Chinese Taipei (Shen)	1	0	2	2	0	2	0	2	0	0	9

Sheet E	1	2	3	4	5	6	7	8	9	10	Final
Australia (Millikin) 🔨	1	0	2	0	0	0	0	0	1	0	4
Japan (Morozumi)	0	1	0	2	0	0	1	1	0	1	6

Team	Final
China (Wang)	6
New Zealand (Becker) 🔨	8

==== Draw 4 ====
Wednesday, November 21, 15:00

Sheet A	1	2	3	4	5	6	7	8	9	10	Final
China (Wang)	0	0	1	0	1	0	0	2	0	X	4
Japan (Morozumi) 🔨	1	1	0	1	0	1	1	0	2	X	7

Sheet D	1	2	3	4	5	6	7	8	9	10	Final
Chinese Taipei (Shen)	1	0	1	0	1	0	0	X	X	X	3
New Zealand (Becker) 🔨	0	2	0	1	0	2	3	X	X	X	8

Sheet E	1	2	3	4	5	6	7	8	9	10	Final
South Korea (Lee) 🔨	1	0	1	0	0	1	0	1	0	0	4
Australia (Millikin)	0	1	0	1	1	0	1	0	1	1	6

==== Draw 5 ====
Thursday, November 22, 9:00

Sheet C	1	2	3	4	5	6	7	8	9	10	Final
New Zealand (Becker)	0	0	0	0	1	0	0	1	1	X	3
Australia (Millikin) 🔨	0	2	1	1	0	0	2	0	0	X	6

Sheet D	1	2	3	4	5	6	7	8	9	10	Final
Japan (Morozumi)	0	1	0	3	0	2	0	0	0	1	7
South Korea (Lee) 🔨	1	0	1	0	2	0	1	1	0	0	6

Sheet E	1	2	3	4	5	6	7	8	9	10	Final
Chinese Taipei (Shen) 🔨	0	0	0	2	0	1	0	0	X	X	3
China (Wang)	2	1	1	0	2	0	1	1	X	X	8

=== Playoffs ===
There were 2 semi-final games in each match up.

Semi-final
1	New Zealand	5, 8
4	Australia	6, 9
2	Japan	5, 3
3	China	6, 8

Final
4	Australia	2
3	China	9

Bronze medal
1	New Zealand	10
2	Japan	7

5th place
5	South Korea	9
6	Chinese Taipei	0

==== Semifinals ====
===== Game 1 =====
Friday, November 23, 9:00

Team	1	2	3	4	5	6	7	8	9	10	11	Final
New Zealand (Becker) 🔨	1	0	1	0	0	1	0	0	1	1	0	5
Australia (Millikin)	0	1	0	2	1	0	0	1	0	0	1	6

Team	1	2	3	4	5	6	7	8	9	10	Final
Japan (Morozumi) 🔨	0	1	0	1	0	1	0	0	1	1	5
China (Wang)	0	0	2	0	1	0	2	1	0	0	6

===== Game 2 =====
Friday, November 23, 14:30

Team	1	2	3	4	5	6	7	8	9	10	Final
China (Wang) 🔨	2	0	1	0	0	2	2	1	0	X	8
Japan (Morozumi)	0	1	0	1	0	0	0	0	1	X	3

Team	1	2	3	4	5	6	7	8	9	10	11	Final
Australia (Millikin) 🔨	1	1	0	0	2	0	2	1	0	1	1	9
New Zealand (Becker)	0	0	2	2	0	3	0	0	1	0	0	8

==== Fifth-place game ====
Saturday, November 24, 14:30

Team	1	2	3	4	5	6	7	8	9	10	Final
Chinese Taipei (Hsu)	0	0	0	0	0	0	X	X	X	X	0
South Korea (Lee) 🔨	0	2	2	2	2	1	X	X	X	X	9

==== Bronze-medal game ====
Saturday, November 24, 14:30

Team	1	2	3	4	5	6	7	8	9	10	Final
New Zealand (Becker) 🔨	1	0	0	1	1	2	0	3	0	2	10
Japan (Morozumi)	0	2	1	0	0	0	2	0	2	0	7

==== Gold-medal game ====
Saturday, November 24, 14:30

Team	1	2	3	4	5	6	7	8	9	10	Final
China (Wang) 🔨	3	0	0	1	2	2	0	1	X	X	9
Australia (Millikin)	0	1	0	0	0	0	1	0	X	X	2

== Women's ==
=== Teams ===
Australia	China	Japan
Skip: Kim Forge; Third: Sandy Gagnon; Second: Lynette Kate Gill; Lead: Madeleine Kate Wilson	Skip: Wang Bingyu; Third: Yue Qingshuang; Second: Liu Yin; Lead: Zhou Yan; Alternate: Liu Jinli	Skip: Moe Meguro; Third: Mari Motohashi; Second: Mayo Yamaura; Lead: Kotomi Ishizaki; Alternate: Anna Ohmiya
South Korea	New Zealand	
Skip: Park Ji-hyun; Third: Kim Mi-yeon; Second: Shin Mi-sung; Lead: Park Kyung-mi; Alternate: Lee Hyun-jung	Skip: Bridget Becker; Third: Brydie Donald; Second: Abby Lee Pyle; Lead: Linda Geary	

=== Round-robin standings ===
Country	Skip	W	L
China	Wang Bingyu	7	1
Japan	Moe Meguro	7	1
South Korea	Park Ji-hyun	4	4
Australia	Kim Forge	1	7
New Zealand	Bridget Becker	1	7

=== Round-robin results ===
==== Draw 1 ====
Monday, November 19, 9:00

Sheet E	1	2	3	4	5	6	7	8	9	10	Final
China (Wang)	0	0	0	2	0	2	2	0	0	1	7
Japan (Meguro) 🔨	0	2	2	0	1	0	0	1	0	0	6

Sheet B	1	2	3	4	5	6	7	8	9	10	Final
Australia (Forge) 🔨	1	0	3	1	0	2	1	2	0	1	11
New Zealand (Becker)	0	2	0	0	1	0	0	0	1	0	4

==== Draw 2 ====
Monday, November 19, 15:00

Sheet D	1	2	3	4	5	6	7	8	9	10	Final
China (Wang) 🔨	0	3	2	2	2	0	1	3	X	X	13
Australia (Forge)	2	0	0	0	0	3	0	0	X	X	5

Sheet E	1	2	3	4	5	6	7	8	9	10	Final
South Korea (Park)	1	0	1	0	1	0	2	0	1	0	6
New Zealand (Becker) 🔨	0	1	0	1	0	1	0	1	0	1	5

==== Draw 3 ====
Tuesday, November 20, 9:00

Sheet D	1	2	3	4	5	6	7	8	9	10	Final
New Zealand (Becker) 🔨	1	0	0	0	1	0	1	0	0	X	3
Japan (Meguro)	0	3	0	2	0	1	0	0	0	X	6

Sheet E	1	2	3	4	5	6	7	8	9	10	Final
Australia (Forge)	0	0	0	0	1	0	0	X	X	X	1
South Korea (Park) 🔨	1	2	1	1	0	4	3	X	X	X	12

==== Draw 4 ====
Tuesday, November 20, 15:00

Sheet A	1	2	3	4	5	6	7	8	9	10	Final
China (Wang)	1	0	2	0	0	2	2	1	1	X	9
South Korea (Park) 🔨	0	1	0	1	1	0	0	0	0	X	3

Sheet C	1	2	3	4	5	6	7	8	9	10	Final
Japan (Meguro)	0	5	2	3	1	2	X	X	X	X	13
Australia (Forge) 🔨	1	0	0	0	0	0	X	X	X	X	1

==== Draw 5 ====
Wednesday, November 21, 9:00

Sheet A	1	2	3	4	5	6	7	8	9	10	Final
New Zealand (Becker)	0	1	0	0	0	0	1	X	X	X	2
China (Wang) 🔨	2	0	4	1	2	1	0	X	X	X	10

Sheet C	1	2	3	4	5	6	7	8	9	10	Final
South Korea (Park)	0	0	1	0	2	0	0	1	0	0	4
Japan (Meguro) 🔨	2	0	0	1	0	2	2	0	1	1	9

==== Draw 6 ====
Wednesday, November 21, 15:00

Sheet B	1	2	3	4	5	6	7	8	9	10	Final
Japan (Meguro)	0	1	0	0	3	1	3	1	0	1	10
China (Wang) 🔨	2	0	3	2	0	0	0	0	1	0	8

Sheet C	1	2	3	4	5	6	7	8	9	10	Final
Australia (Forge)	1	0	1	0	2	1	1	0	0	X	6
New Zealand (Becker) 🔨	0	3	0	4	0	0	0	3	2	X	12

==== Draw 7 ====
Thursday, November 22, 9:00

Sheet A	1	2	3	4	5	6	7	8	9	10	Final
South Korea (Park) 🔨	0	2	1	0	1	0	1	1	0	1	7
New Zealand (Becker)	0	0	0	2	0	2	0	0	1	0	5

Sheet B	1	2	3	4	5	6	7	8	9	10	Final
China (Wang)	3	2	2	2	2	1	X	X	X	X	12
Australia (Forge) 🔨	0	0	0	0	0	0	X	X	X	X	0

==== Draw 8 ====
Thursday, November 22, 15:00

Sheet B	1	2	3	4	5	6	7	8	9	10	Final
New Zealand (Becker)	0	0	0	1	3	0	0	0	0	X	4
Japan (Meguro) 🔨	0	1	1	0	0	1	2	1	1	X	7

Sheet D	1	2	3	4	5	6	7	8	9	10	Final
Australia (Forge) 🔨	1	0	0	1	0	0	1	0	0	X	3
South Korea (Park)	0	2	2	0	1	3	0	2	4	X	14

==== Draw 9 ====
Friday, November 23, 9:00

Sheet A	1	2	3	4	5	6	7	8	9	10	Final
Japan (Meguro) 🔨	4	3	3	2	2	0	X	X	X	X	14
Australia (Forge)	0	0	0	0	0	2	X	X	X	X	2

Sheet D	1	2	3	4	5	6	7	8	9	10	Final
South Korea (Park)	0	0	1	0	0	1	0	1	0	X	3
China (Wang) 🔨	2	0	0	2	2	0	1	0	1	X	8

==== Draw 10 ====
Friday, November 23, 14:30

Sheet A	1	2	3	4	5	6	7	8	9	10	Final
New Zealand (Becker) 🔨	1	0	0	1	0	1	0	1	X	X	4
China (Wang)	0	2	2	0	3	0	3	0	X	X	10

Sheet E	1	2	3	4	5	6	7	8	9	10	Final
Japan (Meguro)	0	1	0	4	1	0	1	0	1	X	8
South Korea (Park) 🔨	1	0	0	0	0	1	0	1	0	X	3

=== Playoffs ===
As China was the first placed team at the conclusion of the round robin, a silver medal game was played to determine which team would go to the 2008 Ford World Women's Curling Championship.

Silver medal
2	Japan	8
3	South Korea	6

==== Silver Medal Game ====
Saturday, November 24, 14:30

Team	1	2	3	4	5	6	7	8	9	10	Final
Japan 🔨	1	0	2	1	2	0	0	2	0	X	8
South Korea	0	2	0	0	0	2	0	0	2	X	6
