= Tokoro Curling Club =

Curling club in Tokoro Town, Hokkaido, Japan

Tokoro Curling Club 常呂カーリング倶楽部
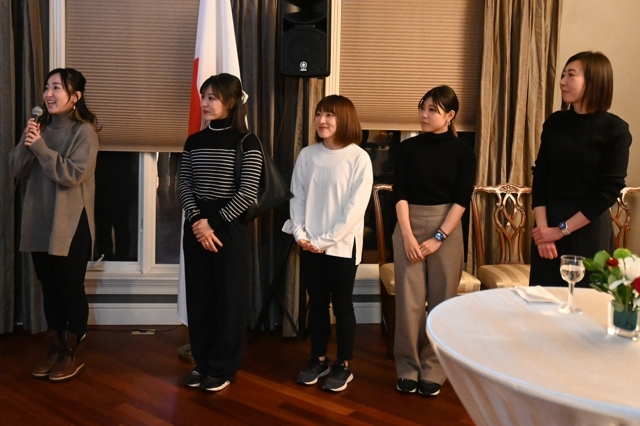
- Interactive map of Tokoro Curling Club
- Location: Tokoro, Kitami, Hokkaido, Japan
- Arena: Advics Tokoro Curling Hall; Public hall held by Kitami City; 44°07′17″N 144°03′22″E
- Host club: Kitami Curling Association

Information
- Established: May 2, 2007; 19 years ago
- Club type: Nonprofit organization
- Sheets of ice: 6
- Rock colours: Red and yellow
- Website: locosolare.jp (in Japanese)

The Tokoro Curling Club (常呂カーリング倶楽部) is a curling club in Tokoro Town, Kitami City, Hokkaido Island, Japan. The club has about 40 teams, including a team "Loco Solare" (ロコ・ソラーレ).

== Background ==
Hokkaido Island, Japan and Alberta, Canada became sister province in 1980. Then, curling was introduced to Tokoro Town as an outdoor recreation while farmers could not work in winter, and has been popular sport among people in Tokoro. In 1981, lessons are held by former world champion curler Wally Ursuliak. The administration of Tokoro Town, later Kitami City, built public indoor curling facility in 1988, which is rebuilt as Advics Tokoro Curling Hall in 2013. But major sponsor does not exist in Tokoro because it is a small local town. As the result, famous curlers born in Tokoro has gone to other prefectures in Japan.

== Loco Solare ==
Loco Solare a.k.a. LS Kitami ロコ・ソラーレ a.k.a. LS北見
- Interactive map of Loco Solare a.k.a. LS Kitami
- We win the victory with smile ☺️
- Location: Tokoro, Kitami, Hokkaido, Japan
- Arena: Advics Tokoro Curling Hall
- Host club: Tokoro Curling Club; Kitami Curling Association

Information
- Established: July 2010 (15 years, 11 months)
- Founder: Mari Motohashi
- Club type: Independent and multi-sponsored
- Website: locosolare.jp (in Japanese)

International medals

Women's curling

Representing Japan

Olympic Games
Silver medal – second place	2022 Beijing	
Bronze medal – third place	2018 Pyeongchang	

World Championships
Silver medal – second place	2016 Swift Current	

Pacific-Asia Championships
Gold medal – first place	2015 Almaty	
Silver medal – second place	2017 Erina	
Bronze medal – third place	2016 Uiseong	

Asian Winter Games
Bronze medal – third place	2017 Sapporo	

"Loco Solare" (ロコ・ソラーレ), also known as the LS Kitami (LS北見), is a women's amateur curling team established in July 2010 by Olympian curler Mari Motohashi. The team is based in, and all the members are from Kitami City. The team got bronze medals at PyeongChang 2018 Winter Olympics.

=== History ===
Mari Motohashi, who was an Olympian at Torino 2006 and at Vancouver 2010 as a member of Team Aomori, had also been one of such curlers. She thought why curlers born in Tokoro could not stay in the town. In the Summer of 2010, she asked two former curlers once retired, Megumi Mabuchi and Akane Eda, and two student curlers Yurika Yoshida and Yumi Suzuki, to join her rink named "Loco Solare," also known as "LS Kitami." At the press conference in Tokyo on 16 August 2010, she announced leaving Japanese national representative Team Aomori to establish her own rink in Tokoro. It was hard to find big sponsor in Kitami City, but small ones increased slowly. But in September 2013, Eda left the team because she could not kept the balance of curling and her work pastry chef.

In June 2014, Sochi 2014 Olympian as alternate; Chinami Yoshida joined the team. In the season of 2014–15, the team got their first winning prize at the World Curling Tour event; Avonair Cash Spiel. In May 2015, Satsuki Fujisawa joined the team. After Fujisawa became the member, Mabuchi retired from games, but the team got medals as Japanese representative in various tournaments every year. In 2015, while Motohashi had maternity leave, Kotomi Ishizaki appeared at Pacific-Asia Championships as alternate.

=== Olympics ===
In September 2017, this amateur team won the five set match at 2017 Japanese Olympic Curling Trials against team Chiaki Matsumura. At PyeongChang 2018, the team got bronze medals.

=== Members ===
Name	Role	Joined	Left	Occupation	Born	Years curled	Throw
Mari Motohashi (本橋 麻里)	Founder, Captain & Alternate	2010	–	Office worker	10 June 1986 (age 40)	28	Right
Megumi Mabuchi (馬渕 恵)	Co-founder & support staff	2010	(Retired: Mar. 2015)	Social worker	6 July 1983 (age 43)		Right
Akane Eda (江田 茜)	Co-founder (Left)	2010	Sep. 2013	Pastry chef	7 July 1989 (age 37)		Right
Yurika Yoshida (吉田 夕梨花)	Lead	2010	–	Office worker	7 July 1993 (age 33)	28	Right
Yūmi Suzuki (鈴木 夕湖)	Second	2010	–	Office worker	2 December 1991 (age 34)	25	Right
Chinami Yoshida (吉田 知那美)	Third & Vice skip	2014	March. 2026	Office worker	26 July 1991 (age 34)	27	Right
Satsuki Fujisawa (藤澤 五月)	Skip	2015	–	Office worker	24 May 1991 (age 35)	30	Right
Ryoji Onodera (小野寺 亮二)	Coach	2010	–	Farmer	13 December 1960 (age 65)		
Junichi Kaizuka (貝塚 純一)	Trainer	2010	2015	Physical therapist			
Tatsuya Omori (大森 達也)	Chief trainer	2014	–	Physical therapist & Athletic trainer	3 October 1973 (age 52)		
Rentaro Suzuki (鈴木 廉太郎)	Trainer		–	Physical therapist & Athletic trainer	5 December 1986 (age 39)		

=== Team ===
Season	Skip	Third	Second	Lead	Alternate	National Events	YTD Ranking
2010–11	Mari Motohashi	Yurika Yoshida	Megumi Mabuchi	Akane Eda	Yumi Suzuki		—
2011–12	Mari Motohashi	Megumi Mabuchi	Yumi Suzuki	Akane Eda	Yurika Yoshida		265
2012–13	Mari Motohashi	Yurika Yoshida	Megumi Mabuchi	Yumi Suzuki	(Akane Eda)		171
2013–14	Mari Motohashi	Yurika Yoshida	Yumi Suzuki	Megumi Mabuchi			155
2014–15	Mari Motohashi	Chinami Yoshida	Yumi Suzuki	Yurika Yoshida	(Megumi Mabuchi)		52
2015–16	Satsuki Fujisawa	Chinami Yoshida	Yumi Suzuki	Yurika Yoshida	Kotomi Ishizaki	PCC	20
2015–16	Satsuki Fujisawa	Chinami Yoshida	Yumi Suzuki	Yurika Yoshida	Mari Motohashi	WCC	20
2016–17	Satsuki Fujisawa	Chinami Yoshida	Mari Motohashi	Yurika Yoshida	Yumi Suzuki	PCC; AWG	32
2017–18	Satsuki Fujisawa	Chinami Yoshida	Yumi Suzuki	Yurika Yoshida	Mari Motohashi	PCC; OG	11
2018-19	Satsuki Fujisawa	Chinami Yoshida	Yumi Suzuki	Yurika Yoshida		PCC; 2018 CWC/First-Leg; 2018 CWC/Second-Leg; 2018 CWC/Grand Final	8

=== Grand Slam record ===
Key
C	Champion
F	Lost in Final
SF	Lost in Semifinal
QF	Lost in Quarterfinals
R16	Lost in the round of 16
Q	Did not advance to playoffs
T2	Played in Tier 2 event
DNP	Did not participate in event
N/A	Not a Grand Slam event that season

Event	'14–15	'15–16	'16–17	'17–18
Tour Challenge	N/A	DNP	DNP	DNP
Masters	DNP	DNP	DNP	DNP
The National	N/A	DNP	DNP	DNP
Canadian Open	DNP	DNP	DNP	DNP
Players'	DNP	DNP	DNP	QF
Champions Cup	N/A	Q	DNP	Q

==== Former events ====
Event	'14–15
Autumn Gold	Q

=== Other notable WCT record ===
World Curling Tour records other than Grand Slam.

Result	Season	Event	Reference
Winner	2014–15	Avonair Cash Spiel	
Runner-up	2015–16	International Crown of Curling	
Runner-up	2015–16	Karuizawa International	
Runner-up	2015–16	World Women's Curling Championship	
Runner-up	2016–17	International Crown of Curling	
Runner-up	2017–18	Red Deer Curling Classic	
