= Aomori Curling Club =

Japanese curling club

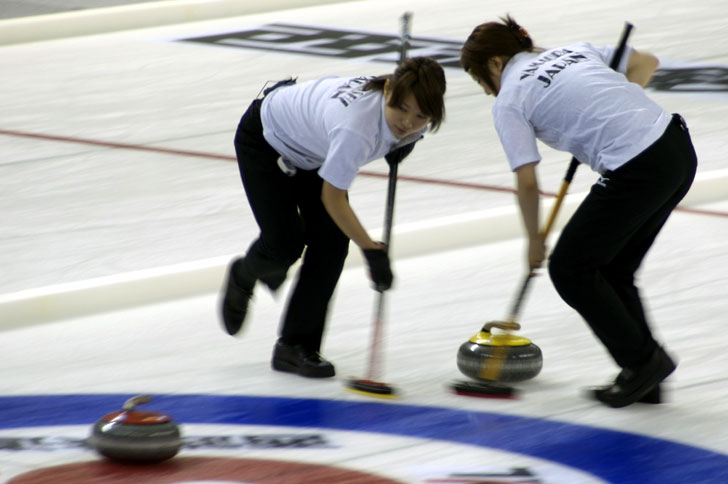
Team Aomori's Mari Motohashi (Third) and Mayo Yamaura (Second) at the 16th Pacific Curling Championships in Tokyo, Japan

The Aomori Curling Club is a curling club in Aomori, Japan. It is best known as being the home of Team Aomori (チーム青森), a women's curling team that won six Japanese Curling Championships (2004, 2006, 2007, 2008, 2009 & 2010) and represented Japan at four World Curling Championships (2005, 2007, 2008 & 2010) and at two Winter Olympics (2006 & 2010).

Event	Result	Record	Team
2005 World Women's Curling Championship	9th	3–8	Fourth: Yumie Hayashi; Skip: Ayumi Onodera; Second: Mari Motohashi; Lead: Sakurako Terada; Alternate: Ai Kobayashi
2006 Turin Olympic Games	7th	4–5	Skip: Ayumi Onodera; Third: Yumie Hayashi; Second: Mari Motohashi; Lead: Moe Meguro; Alternate: Sakurako Terada
2007 World Women's Curling Championship	9th	4–7	Skip: Moe Meguro; Third: Mari Motohashi; Second: Mayo Yamaura; Lead: Sakurako Terada; Alternate: Asuka Yogo
2008 World Women's Curling Championship	4th	7–4	Skip: Moe Meguro; Third: Mari Motohashi; Second: Mayo Yamaura; Lead: Kotomi Ishizaki; Alternate: Anna Ohmiya
2010 Vancouver Olympic Games	8th	3–6	Skip: Moe Meguro; Third: Anna Ohmiya; Second: Mari Motohashi; Lead: Kotomi Ishizaki; Alternate: Mayo Yamaura
2010 World Women's Curling Championship	11th	2–9	Skip: Moe Meguro; Third: Anna Ohmiya; Second: Mari Motohashi; Lead: Kotomi Ishizaki; Alternate: Mayo Yamaura
