= Mari Motohashi =

Japanese curler (born 1986)

- Curler
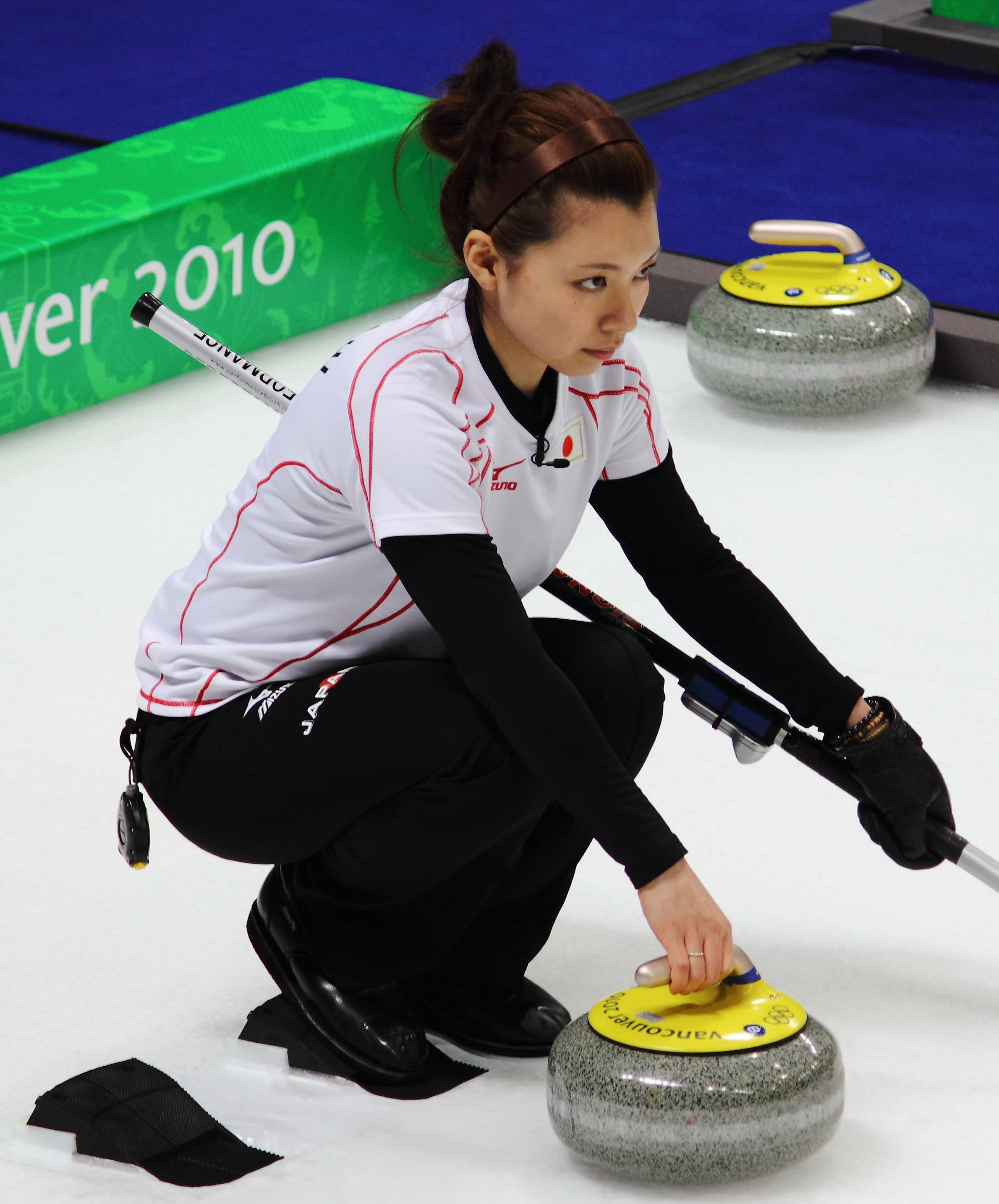
- Motohashi in 2010
- Born: 10 June 1986 (age 40); Kitami, Japan

Team
- Curling club: Loco Solare CC, Kitami, Japan
- Skip: Honoka Sasaki
- Third: Mari Motohashi
- Second: Miki Hayashi
- Lead: Mayumi Saito
- Alternate: Yako Matsuzawa

Curling career
- Member Association: Japan
- World Championship: 6 (2004, 2005, 2007, 2008, 2010, 2016)
- Pacific-Asia Championship: 8 (2003, 2004, 2006, 2007, 2008, 2009, 2016, 2017)
- Olympic: 3 (2006, 2010, 2018)
Medal record
Women's Curling
Representing Japan
Olympic Games
Bronze medal – third place	2018 Pyeongchang	Team
World Championships
Silver medal – second place	2016 Swift Current
Pacific-Asia Championships
Gold medal – first place	2003 Aomori
Gold medal – first place	2004 Chuncheon
Silver medal – second place	2007 Beijing
Silver medal – second place	2009 Karuizawa
Silver medal – second place	2017 Erina
Bronze medal – third place	2006 Tokyo
Bronze medal – third place	2008 Naseby
Bronze medal – third place	2016 Uiseong
Winter Universiade
Bronze medal – third place	2007 Pinerolo
Asian Winter Games
Bronze medal – third place	2017 Sapporo

Mari Motohashi (本橋 麻里, Motohashi Mari; born 10 June 1986) is a Japanese curler. She currently plays third on Team Honoka Sasaki. She won a bronze medal at the 2018 Winter Olympics as the alternate of the team skipped by Satsuki Fujisawa.

== Career ==
Motohashi was a member of Team Aomori which represented Japan at two Winter Olympics (2006 and 2010). She threw second stones for Ayumi Onodera at the 2006 Winter Olympics, finishing 7th, and played second for Moe Meguro at the 2010 Winter Olympics, finishing 8th. She skipped the Japan team at the 2002 World Junior Curling Championships, finishing last. She has also played for Japan at five World Curling Championships: 2004 (7th), 2005 (9th), 2007 (9th), 2008 (4th) & 2010 (11th).

After playing for the Meguro rink from 2007 to 2010, Motohashi began skipping her own team. She has yet to represent Japan internationally as a skip on the senior level.

On the World Curling Tour, Motohashi won the 2007 Meyers Norris Penny Charity Classic and the 2009 Twin Anchors Invitational while playing for Meguro, and later skipped her own rink to win the 2014 Avonair Cash Spiel.

Founded own rink "Loco Solare", a.k.a. "LS Kitami" in her hometown Tokoro, Kitami in Aug. 2010. The team members are all local members but achieved international success as the 2nd place in the 2016 World Women's Curling Championship in Swift Current.

Motohashi was part of the Japanese team that won the 2018 Olympics women curling bronze medal.

In June 2018, Motohashi announced that she would rest for a while from a top curling player and concentrate on training young players.

In 2021, she took over the Miki Hayashi rink as their skip.

== Personal life ==
Motohashi graduated from Nippon Sport Science University. Her nickname is 'Marilyn' named after her given name. Holding Teacher's License for Junior High School - Grade 2 in Japan (health and physical training). She was awarded as an honorary citizen of Kitami City.

== Teammates ==
Season	Skip	Third	Second	Lead	Alternate	Events
2001–02	Mari Motohashi	Naoko Yamazaki	Megumi Kobayashi	Mina Sasaki	Anna Ohmiya	2002 WJCC
2003–04	Shinobu Aota	Yukari Okazaki	Eriko Minatoya	Kotomi Ishizaki	Mari Motohashi	2003 PCC, 2004 WCC
2004–05	Yumie Hayashi	Ayumi Onodera	Mari Motohashi	Sakurako Terada	Ai Kobayashi	2004 PCC, 2005 WCC
2005–06	Ayumi Onodera	Yumie Hayashi	Mari Motohashi	Moe Meguro	Sakurako Terada	2006 OG
2006–07	Moe Meguro	Mari Motohashi	Mayo Yamaura	Sakurako Terada	Asuka Yogo	2006 PCC, 2007 WUG, WCC
2007–08	Moe Meguro	Mari Motohashi	Mayo Yamaura	Kotomi Ishizaki	Anna Ohmiya	2007 PCC, 2008 WCC
2008–09	Moe Meguro	Mari Motohashi	Mayo Yamaura	Kotomi Ishizaki	Anna Ohmiya	2008 PCC
2009–10	Moe Meguro	Anna Ohmiya	Mari Motohashi	Kotomi Ishizaki	Mayo Yamaura	2009 PCC, 2010 OG, WCC
2010–11	Mari Motohashi	Yurika Yoshida	Megumi Mabuchi	Akane Eda	Yumi Suzuki	
2011–12	Mari Motohashi	Megumi Mabuchi	Yumi Suzuki	Akane Eda	Yurika Yoshida	
2012–13	Mari Motohashi	Yurika Yoshida	Megumi Mabuchi	Yumi Suzuki	Akane Eda	
2013–14	Mari Motohashi	Yurika Yoshida	Yumi Suzuki	Megumi Mabuchi		
2014–15	Mari Motohashi	Chinami Yoshida	Yumi Suzuki	Yurika Yoshida	Megumi Mabuchi	
2015–16	Satsuki Fujisawa	Chinami Yoshida	Yumi Suzuki	Yurika Yoshida	Mari Motohashi	2016 WCC
2016–17	Satsuki Fujisawa	Chinami Yoshida	Mari Motohashi	Yurika Yoshida	Yumi Suzuki	2016 PCC, 2017 AWG
2017–18	Satsuki Fujisawa	Chinami Yoshida	Yumi Suzuki	Yurika Yoshida	Mari Motohashi	2017 PCC, 2018 OG
2021–22	Mari Motohashi	Yako Matsuzawa	Miki Hayashi	Mayumi Saito	Ayumi Aoki	
2022–23	Honoka Sasaki	Mari Motohashi	Miki Hayashi	Ayuna Aoki	Mayumi Saito	
2023–24	Honoka Sasaki	Mari Motohashi	Miki Hayashi	Mayumi Saito	Yako Matsuzawa	

== Grand Slam record ==
Key
C	Champion
F	Lost in Final
SF	Lost in Semifinal
QF	Lost in Quarterfinals
R16	Lost in the round of 16
Q	Did not advance to playoffs
T2	Played in Tier 2 event
DNP	Did not participate in event
N/A	Not a Grand Slam event that season

Event	2015–16	2016–17	2017–18
Players'	DNP	DNP	QF
Champions Cup	Q	DNP	DNP

=== Former events ===
Event	2006–07	2007–08	2008–09	2009–10	2010–11	2011–12	2012–13	2013–14	2014–15
Autumn Gold	Q	Q	Q	Q	Q	DNP	DNP	DNP	Q
