= Mayo Yamaura =

Japanese curler

Mayo Yamaura 山浦 麻葉
- Curler
- Born: April 29, 1984 (age 42)

Team
- Curling club: Aomori CC, Aomori

Curling career
- Member Association: Japan
- World Championship: 3 (2007, 2008, 2010)
- Pacific-Asia Championship: 5 (2006, 2007, 2008, 2009, 2010)
- Olympic: 1 (2026)
Medal record
Women's curling
Representing Japan
Pacific-Asia Curling Championships
Silver medal – second place	2007 Beijing
Silver medal – second place	2009 Karuizawa
Bronze medal – third place	2006 Tokyo
Bronze medal – third place	2008 Naseby
Bronze medal – third place	2010 Uiseong
Winter Universiade
Bronze medal – third place	2007 Torino
Representing Aomori
Japan Curling Championships
Gold medal – first place	2007 Moseushi
Gold medal – first place	2008 Karuizawa
Gold medal – first place	2009 Aomori
Gold medal – first place	2010 Tokoro
Silver medal – second place	2011 Nayoro
Bronze medal – third place	2012 Aomori
Representing Nagano
Japan Curling Championships
Gold medal – first place	2026 Yokohama

Mayo Yamaura (山浦 麻葉, Yamaura Mayo; born April 29, 1984) is a curler from Aomori, Japan.

Mayo Yamaura made her debut at a major curling competition at the 2008 World Championships in Vernon, British Columbia, Canada. She threw second stones. Team Japan, along with Team China, made history by becoming the first teams from the Pacific region to advance to the Medal Rounds at a Curling World Championship.

She played for Team Japan at the 2010 Winter Olympics in Vancouver, British Columbia, Canada. Yamaura served as the Alternate for the team.

== Teammates ==
2010 Vancouver Olympic Games

- Moe Meguro, Skip
- Anna Ohmiya, Third
- Mari Motohashi, Second
- Kotomi Ishizaki, Lead
