= Liu Jinli =

Chinese curler

Liu Jinli 刘金莉
- Curler
- Born: March 16, 1989 (age 37); Harbin, Heilongjiang, China

Team
- Curling club: Heilongjiang CC, Harbin, Heilongjiang

Curling career
- Member Association: China
- World Championship: 7 (2008, 2009, 2012, 2013, 2014, 2015, 2017)
- Pacific-Asia Championship: 7 (2007, 2008, 2009, 2011, 2012, 2015, 2016)
- Olympic: 2 (2010, 2018)
Medal record
Women's curling
Representing China
Winter Olympics
Bronze medal – third place	2010 Vancouver
World Championships
Gold medal – first place	2009 Gangneung
Silver medal – second place	2008 Vernon
Pacific Championships
Gold medal – first place	2007 Beijing
Gold medal – first place	2008 Naseby
Gold medal – first place	2009 Karuizawa
Gold medal – first place	2011 Nanjing
Gold medal – first place	2012 Naseby
Silver medal – second place	2016 Uiseong
Bronze medal – third place	2015 Astana
Asian Winter Games
Gold medal – first place	2017 Sapporo
Pacific Junior Championships
Gold medal – first place	2010 Nayoro
Silver medal – second place	2008 Jeonju City
Silver medal – second place	2009 Harbin
Winter Universiade
Gold medal – first place	2009 Harbin
New Zealand Winter Games
Silver medal – second place	2011 Naseby

Liu Jinli
- Simplified Chinese: 刘金莉
- Traditional Chinese: 劉金莉
Transcriptions
Standard Mandarin
- Hanyu Pinyin: Liú Jīnlì
- IPA: [ljǒʊ tɕín lî]

Liu Jinli (Chinese: 刘金莉; pinyin: Liú Jīnlì; Mandarin pronunciation: [ljǒʊ tɕín lî]; born March 16, 1989) is an internationally elite curler from China.

She curls out of the club in Heilongjiang and is currently a member of the Chinese National Team.

As a member of the National Team she competed for Team China at the 2010 Winter Olympics in Vancouver, British Columbia. She is the alternate for the team and won a bronze medal.

== Teammates ==
2010 Vancouver Olympic Games

- Wang Bingyu, Skip
- Liu Yin, Third
- Yue Qingshuang, Second
- Zhou Yan, Lead
