= Curling at the 2010 Winter Olympics – Women's tournament =

Curling - women's tournament at the XXI Olympic Winter Games
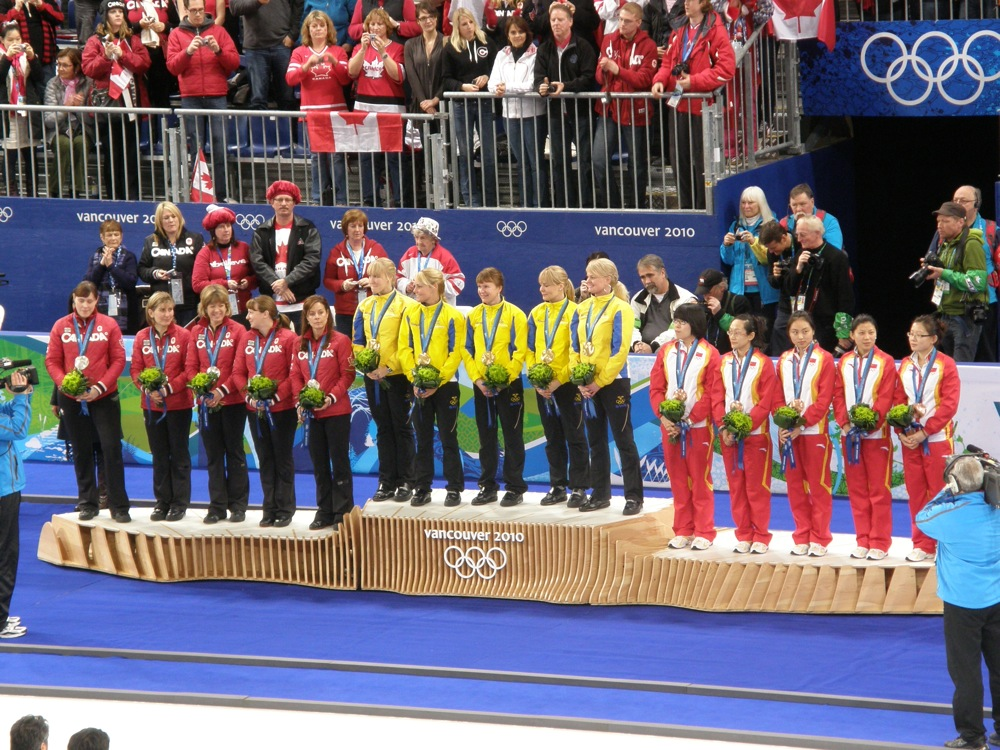
- Curling: Olympic medalists Vancouver 2010
- Venue: Vancouver Olympic/Paralympic Centre
- Dates: February 16–26, 2010

Medalists
1st place, gold medalist(s)		Sweden	Sweden
2nd place, silver medalist(s)		Canada	Canada
3rd place, bronze medalist(s)		China	China

The women's curling tournament took place at the Vancouver Olympic/Paralympic Centre. The draws took place between 16 and 25 February 2010 and the final took place on 26 February 2010. All start times are in Pacific Standard Time (UTC-8). The preliminary round was a round-robin tournament between all 10 teams; the top four qualified for the medal round.

== Teams ==
The teams are listed as follows:

Canada	China	Denmark	Germany	Great Britain
Calgary WC, Calgary: Skip: Cheryl Bernard; Third: Susan O'Connor; Second: Carolyn Darbyshire; Lead: Cori Bartel; Alternate: Kristie Moore	Harbin CC, Harbin: Skip: Wang Bingyu; Third: Liu Yin; Second: Yue Qingshuang; Lead: Zhou Yan; Alternate: Liu Jinli	Tårnby CC, Tårnby: Fourth: Madeleine Dupont; Third: Denise Dupont; Skip: Angelina Jensen*; Lead: Camilla Jensen; Alternate: Ane Hansen	SC Riessersee, Garmisch-Partenkirchen: Skip: Andrea Schöpp; Third: Monika Wagner; Second: Melanie Robillard; Lead: Stella Heiß; Alternate: Corinna Scholz	British Olympic Committee: Skip: Eve Muirhead; Third: Jackie Lockhart; Second: Kelly Wood; Lead: Lorna Vevers; Alternate: Anne Laird
Japan	Russia	Sweden	Switzerland	United States
Aomori CC, Aomori: Skip: Moe Meguro; Third: Anna Ohmiya; Second: Mari Motohashi; Lead: Kotomi Ishizaki; Alternate: Mayo Yamaura	Moskvitch CC, Moscow: Skip: Ludmila Privivkova; Third: Anna Sidorova**; Second: Nkeiruka Ezekh; Lead: Ekaterina Galkina; Alternate: Margarita Fomina	Härnösands CK, Härnösand: Skip: Anette Norberg; Third: Eva Lund; Second: Cathrine Lindahl; Lead: Anna Le Moine; Alternate: Kajsa Bergström	Davos CC, Davos: Skip: Mirjam Ott; Third: Carmen Schäfer; Second: Carmen Küng; Lead: Janine Greiner; Alternate: Irene Schori	Madison CC, Madison: Skip: Debbie McCormick***; Third: Allison Pottinger***; Second: Nicole Joraanstad; Lead: Natalie Nicholson; Alternate: Tracy Sachtjen

*Throws second rocks

**The World Curling Federation had Olga Jarkova listed as the Third. However, a press release by the Vancouver Organizing Committee has Anna Sidorova listed as Third.

***On Feb 21, 2010, Debbie McCormick switched to throwing third, with Allison Pottinger throwing fourth.

== Standings ==
Standings after the preliminary round. Top four qualified for the medal round.

Final round robin standings
Team	Skip	Pld	W	L	PF	PA	EW	EL	BE	SE	S%	Qualification
Canada	Cheryl Bernard	9	8	1	56	37	40	29	20	13	81%	Playoffs
Sweden	Anette Norberg	9	7	2	56	52	36	36	13	5	79%	Playoffs
China	Wang Bingyu	9	6	3	61	47	39	37	12	7	74%	Playoffs
Switzerland	Mirjam Ott	9	6	3	67	48	40	36	7	12	76%	Playoffs
Denmark	Angelina Jensen	9	4	5	49	61	31	40	15	5	74%	
Germany	Andrea Schöpp	9	3	6	52	56	35	40	15	4	75%	
Great Britain	Eve Muirhead	9	3	6	54	59	36	41	11	10	75%	
Japan	Moe Meguro	9	3	6	64	70	36	37	13	5	73%	
Russia	Liudmila Privivkova	9	3	6	53	60	36	40	14	13	77%	
United States	Debbie McCormick	9	2	7	43	65	36	36	12	12	77%	

=== Results ===
Results of the preliminary round.

Team	CAN	CHN	DEN	GER	GBR	JPN	RUS	SWE	SUI	USA
Canada	—	5–6	5–4	6–5	6–5	7–6	7–3	6–2	5–4	9–2
China	6–5	—	11–1	9–7	4–5	9–5	4–7	4–6	8–6	6–5
Denmark	4–5	1–11	—	6–5	9–8	7–5	3–7	5–6	7–8	7–6
Germany	5–6	7–9	5–6	—	4–7	7–6	9–5	7–8	2–4	6–5
Great Britain	5–6	5–4	8–9	7–4	—	4–11	10–3	4–6	6–10	5–6
Japan	6–7	5–9	5–7	6–7	11–4	—	12–9	6–10	4–10	9–7
Russia	3–7	7–4	7–3	5–9	3–10	9–12	—	10–1	5–8	4–6
Sweden	2–6	6–4	6–5	8–7	6–4	10–6	1–10	—	8–7	9–3
Switzerland	4–5	6–8	8–7	4–2	10–6	10–4	8–5	7–8	—	10–3
United States	2–9	5–6	6–7	5–6	6–5	7–9	6–4	3–9	3–10	—

== Draws ==
=== Draw 1 ===
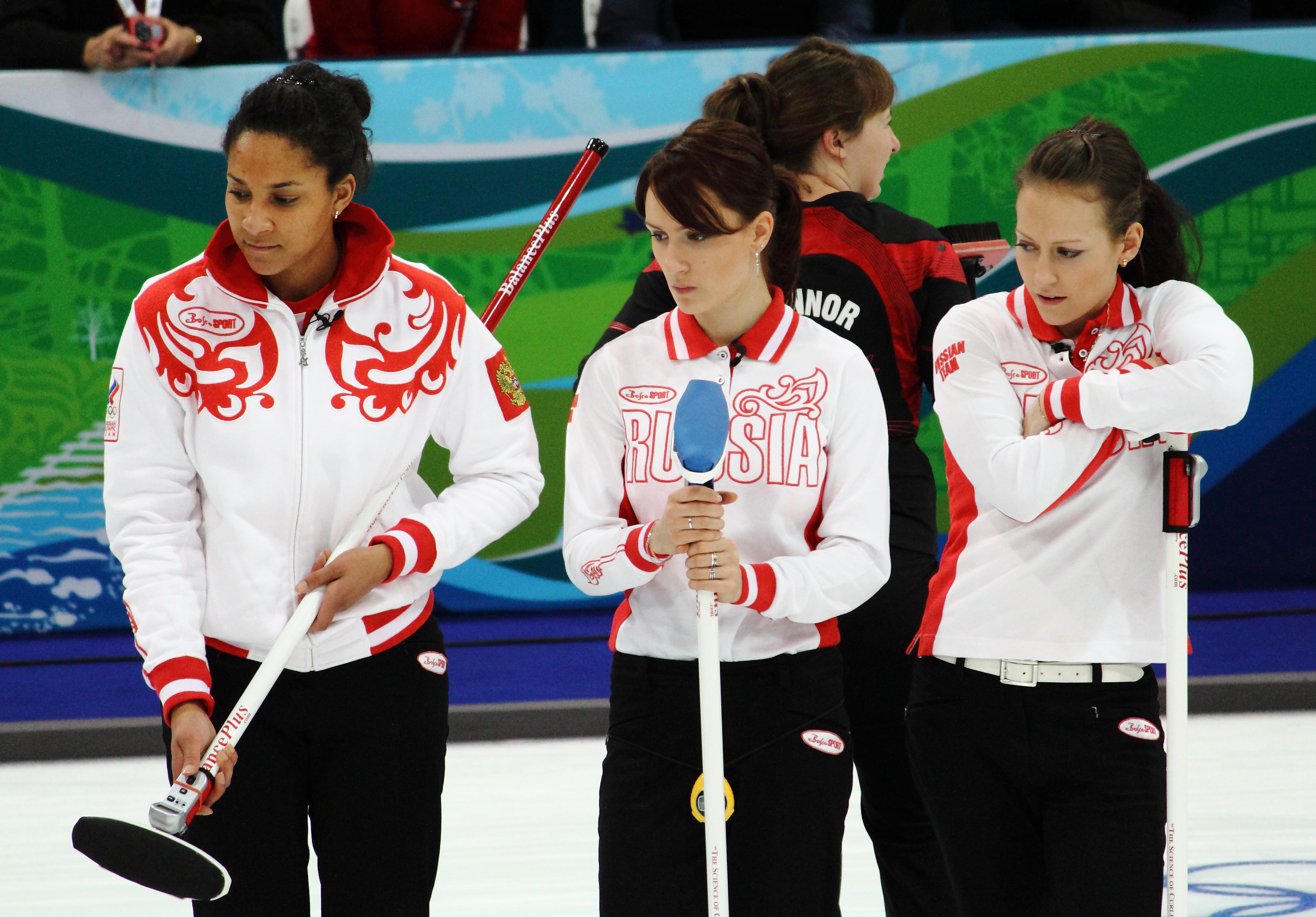
Russian curlers at the 2010 Winter Olympics

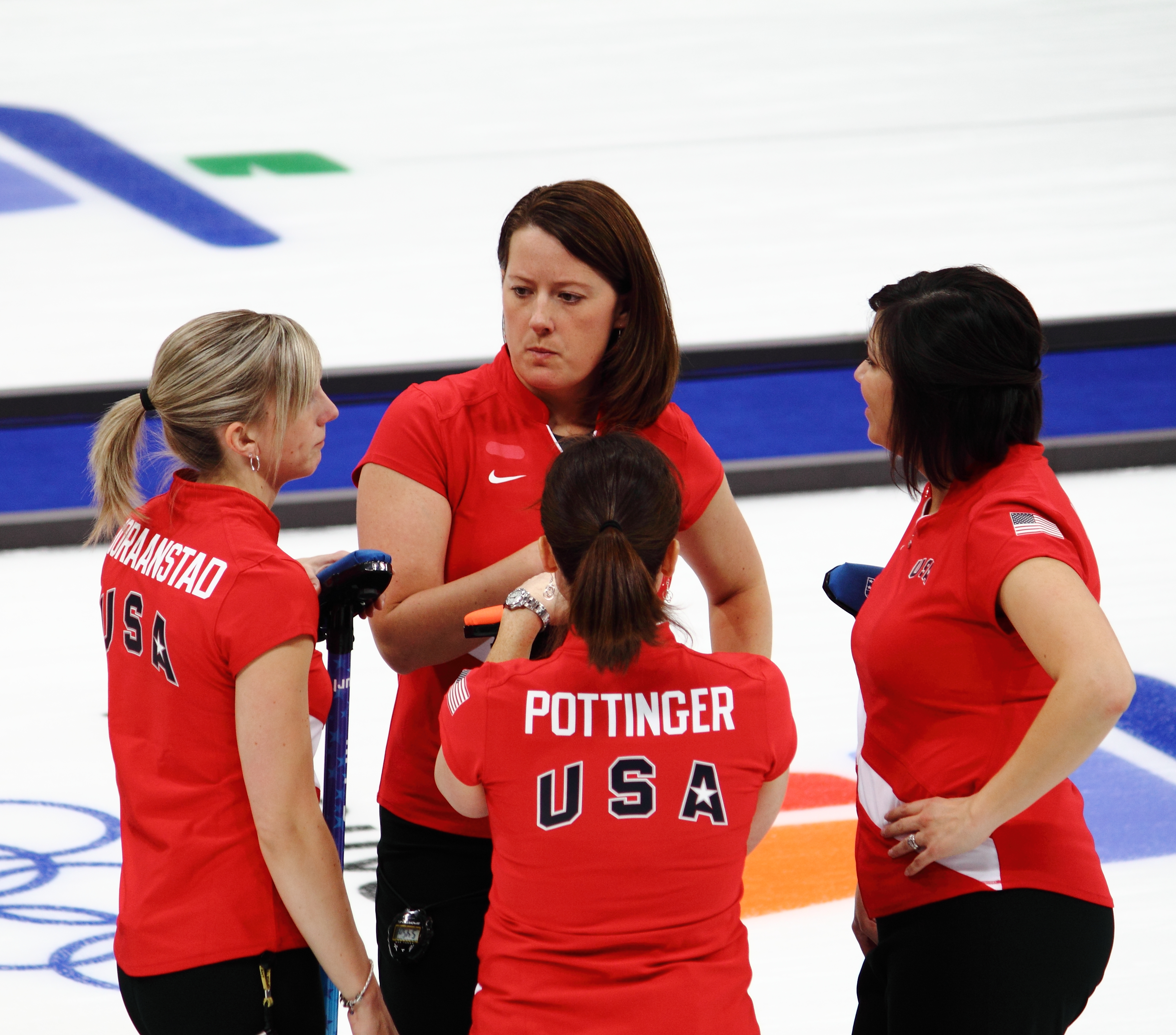
American curlers at the 2010 Winter Olympics

Tuesday, February 16, 2:00 p.m.

Sheet A	1	2	3	4	5	6	7	8	9	10	Final
United States (McCormick) 🔨	1	2	0	1	0	2	0	1	0	0	7
Japan (Meguro)	0	0	1	0	3	0	3	0	1	1	9

Sheet B	1	2	3	4	5	6	7	8	9	10	Final
Denmark (Jensen) 🔨	0	0	2	0	1	0	0	2	0	0	5
Sweden (Norberg)	0	0	0	1	0	2	0	0	2	1	6

Sheet C	1	2	3	4	5	6	7	8	9	10	Final
Germany (Schöpp) 🔨	2	0	2	0	1	0	0	1	0	3	9
Russia (Privivkova)	0	1	0	1	0	0	1	0	2	0	5

Sheet D	1	2	3	4	5	6	7	8	9	10	Final
Canada (Bernard) 🔨	0	0	1	0	0	2	0	1	0	1	5
Switzerland (Ott)	0	0	0	2	0	0	1	0	1	0	4

=== Draw 2 ===
Wednesday, February 17, 9:00 a.m.

Sheet A	1	2	3	4	5	6	7	8	9	10	11	Final
China (Wang)	0	1	0	0	0	0	0	1	0	2	0	4
Great Britain (Muirhead) 🔨	0	0	0	1	2	0	0	0	1	0	1	5

Sheet B	1	2	3	4	5	6	7	8	9	10	Final
Germany (Schöpp) 🔨	1	0	0	0	3	0	0	2	0	0	6
United States (McCormick)	0	0	0	1	0	1	1	0	1	1	5

Sheet C	1	2	3	4	5	6	7	8	9	10	11	Final
Switzerland (Ott)	0	2	0	1	0	1	0	1	0	2	0	7
Sweden (Norberg) 🔨	1	0	1	0	2	0	2	0	1	0	1	8

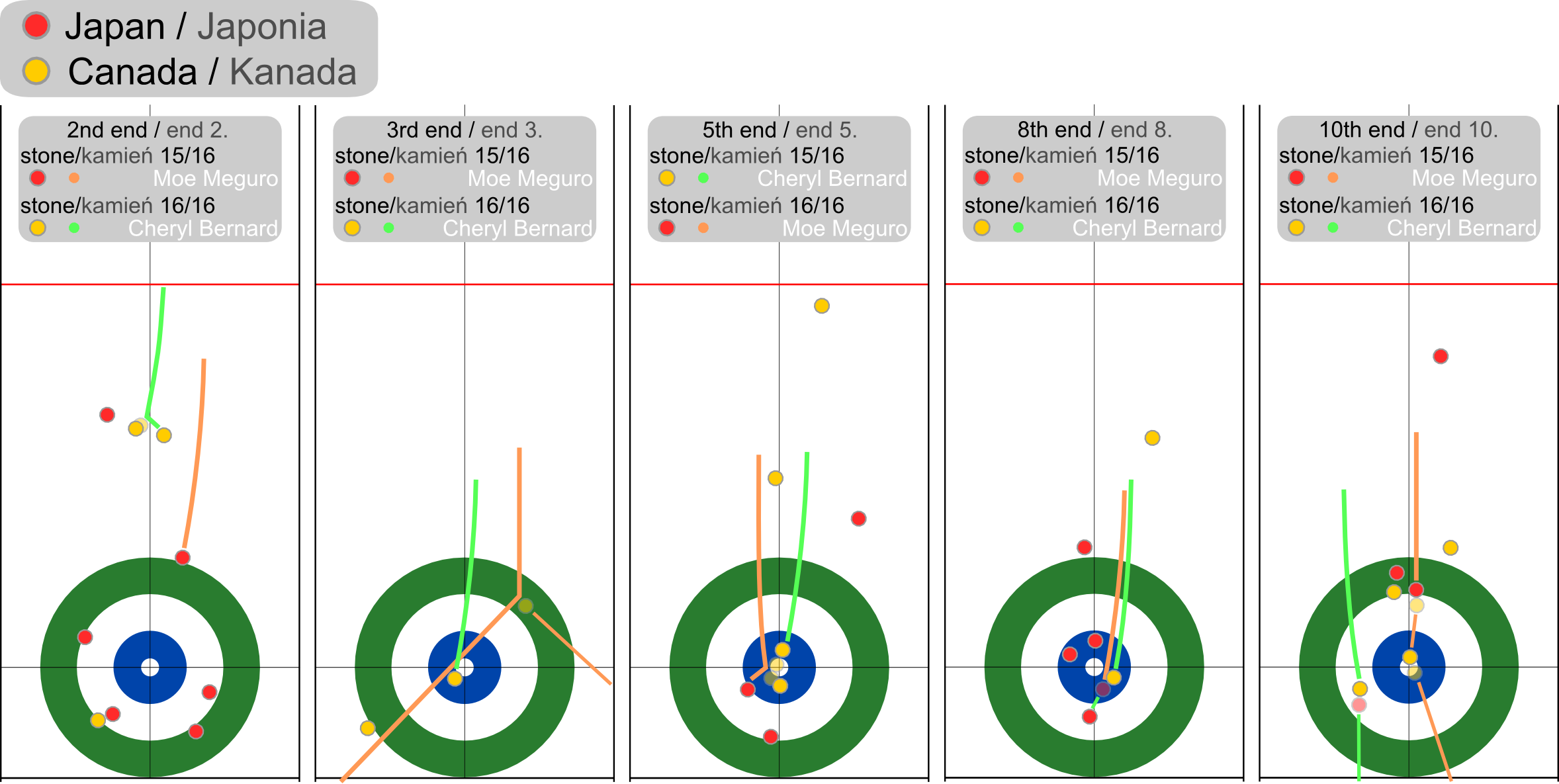

Sheet D	1	2	3	4	5	6	7	8	9	10	Final
Japan (Meguro)	0	3	0	0	0	2	0	0	1	0	6
Canada (Bernard) 🔨	0	0	2	0	2	0	0	1	0	2	7

=== Draw 3 ===
Wednesday, February 17, 7:00 p.m.

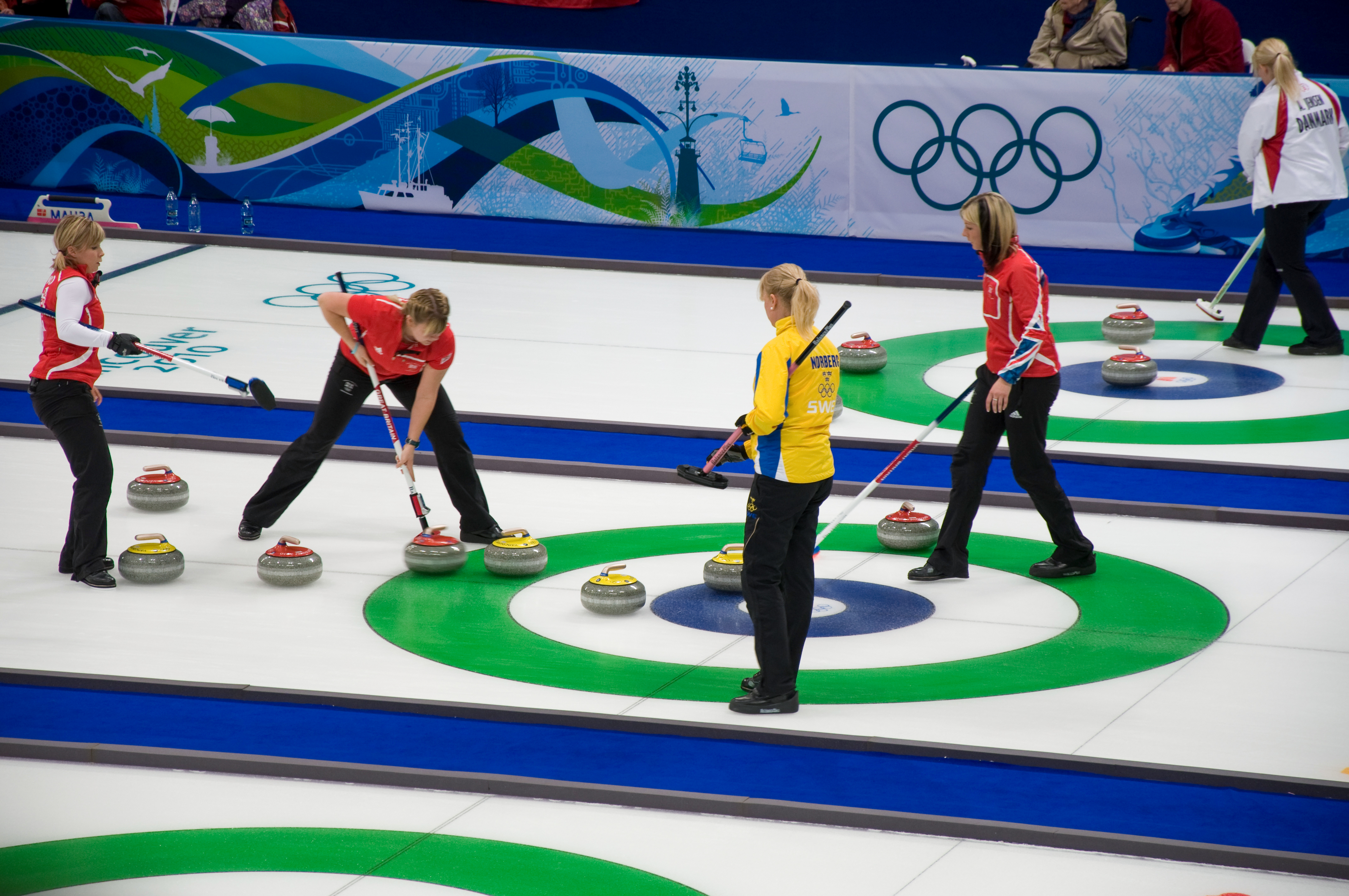
Curling match Great Britain (red) v. Sweden (yellow)

Sheet A	1	2	3	4	5	6	7	8	9	10	Final
Russia (Privivkova)	0	0	1	0	0	2	0	1	1	2	7
Denmark (Jensen) 🔨	0	0	0	2	0	0	1	0	0	0	3

Sheet B	1	2	3	4	5	6	7	8	9	10	Final
Great Britain (Muirhead)	0	0	1	0	1	0	1	0	1	0	4
Sweden (Norberg) 🔨	1	1	0	2	0	0	0	1	0	1	6

Sheet D	1	2	3	4	5	6	7	8	9	10	Final
China (Wang)	0	1	0	0	4	0	1	1	0	1	8
Switzerland (Ott) 🔨	2	0	0	1	0	1	0	0	2	0	6

=== Draw 4 ===
Thursday, February 18, 2:00 p.m.

Sheet A	1	2	3	4	5	6	7	8	9	10	11	Final
Canada (Bernard)	0	0	0	2	0	2	0	1	0	0	1	6
Germany (Schöpp) 🔨	0	1	0	0	1	0	1	0	1	1	0	5

Sheet B	1	2	3	4	5	6	7	8	9	10	Final
China (Wang) 🔨	2	0	0	0	2	0	2	0	0	3	9
Japan (Meguro)	0	1	0	1	0	1	0	2	0	0	5

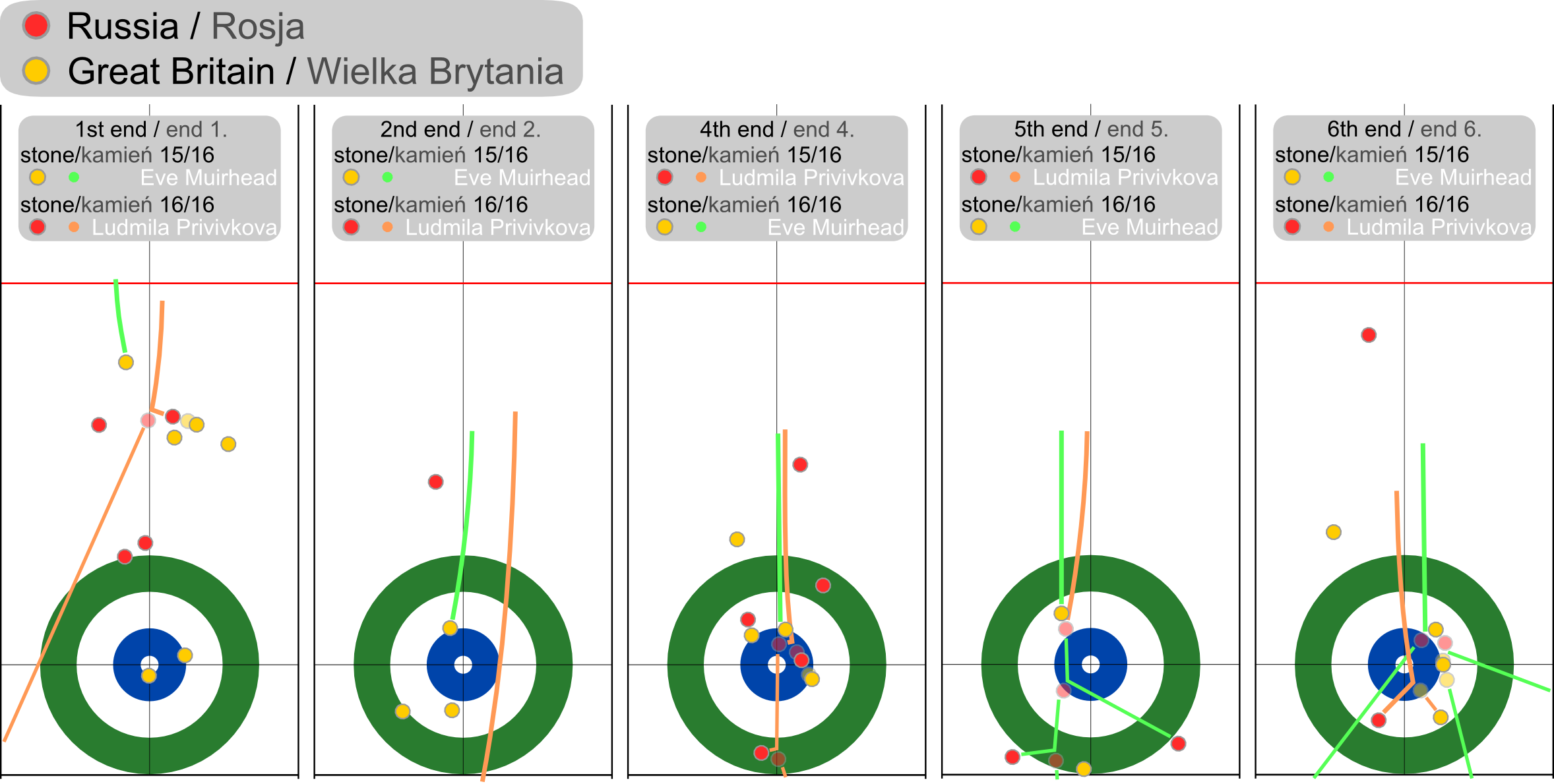

Sheet C	1	2	3	4	5	6	7	8	9	10	Final
Russia (Privivkova) 🔨	0	0	1	1	0	0	1	0	x	x	3
Great Britain (Muirhead)	2	3	0	0	2	2	0	1	x	x	10

Sheet D	1	2	3	4	5	6	7	8	9	10	Final
Denmark (Jensen)	1	1	0	0	0	1	3	0	1	0	7
United States (McCormick) 🔨	0	0	2	1	1	0	0	1	0	1	6

=== Draw 5 ===
Friday, February 19, 9:00 a.m.

Sheet A	1	2	3	4	5	6	7	8	9	10	Final
Germany (Schöpp)	1	0	0	0	2	0	0	1	0	x	4
Great Britain (Muirhead) 🔨	0	1	1	1	0	0	1	0	3	x	7

Sheet B	1	2	3	4	5	6	7	8	9	10	Final
Russia (Sidorova) 🔨	0	0	0	1	0	0	2	0	1	0	4
United States (McCormick)	0	0	1	0	2	0	0	1	0	2	6

Sheet C	1	2	3	4	5	6	7	8	9	10	Final
China (Wang) 🔨	1	2	1	2	0	5	x	x	x	x	11
Denmark (Jensen)	0	0	0	0	1	0	x	x	x	x	1

=== Draw 6 ===
Friday, February 19, 7:00 p.m.

Sheet A	1	2	3	4	5	6	7	8	9	10	11	Final
Denmark (Jensen)	0	1	0	0	0	2	0	0	0	1	0	4
Canada (Bernard) 🔨	1	0	0	1	0	0	0	1	1	0	1	5

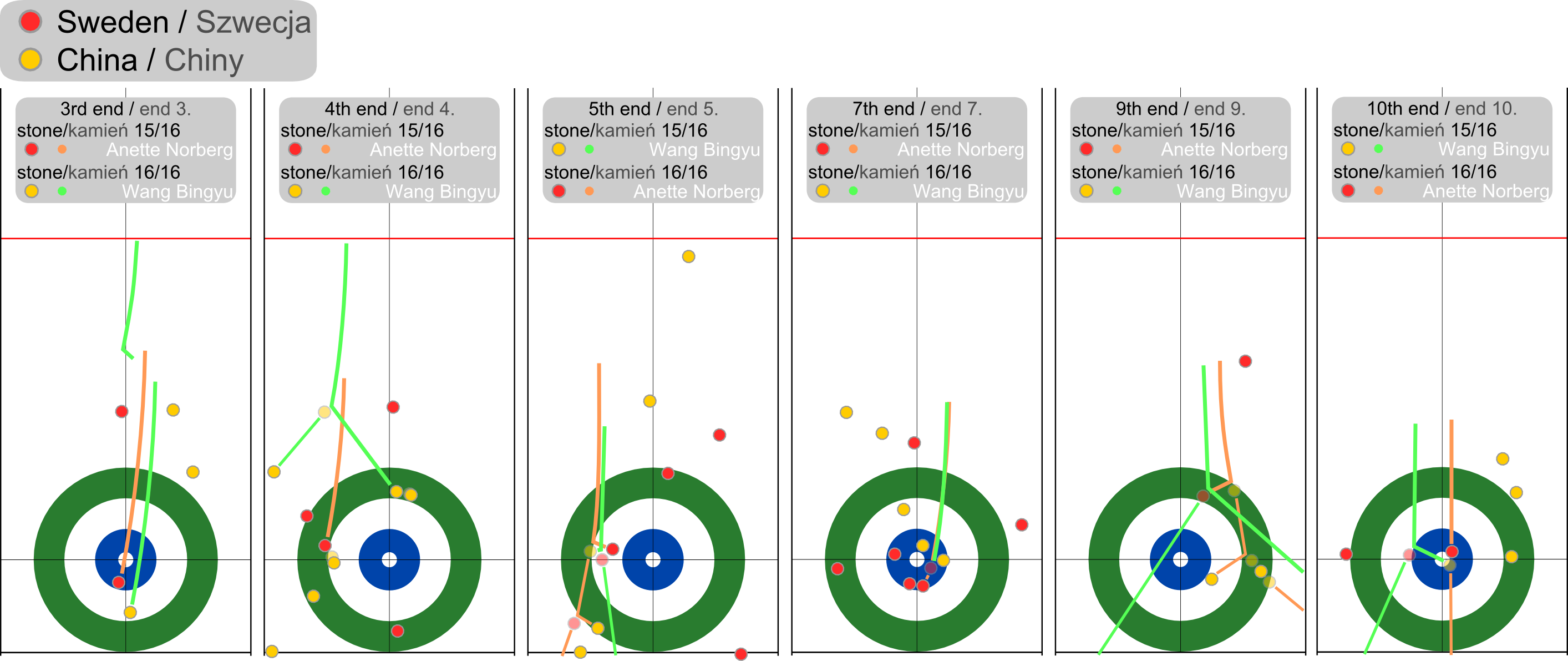

Sheet B	1	2	3	4	5	6	7	8	9	10	Final
Sweden (Norberg) 🔨	1	0	1	0	2	0	0	1	0	1	6
China (Wang)	0	0	0	1	0	0	1	0	2	0	4

Sheet C	1	2	3	4	5	6	7	8	9	10	Final
Great Britain (Muirhead)	0	0	1	0	2	0	0	1	0	x	4
Japan (Meguro) 🔨	1	0	0	3	0	1	1	0	5	x	11

Sheet D	1	2	3	4	5	6	7	8	9	10	Final
Switzerland (Ott)	4	1	0	0	1	1	0	1	0	x	8
Russia (Sidorova) 🔨	0	0	1	1	0	0	2	0	1	x	5

=== Draw 7 ===
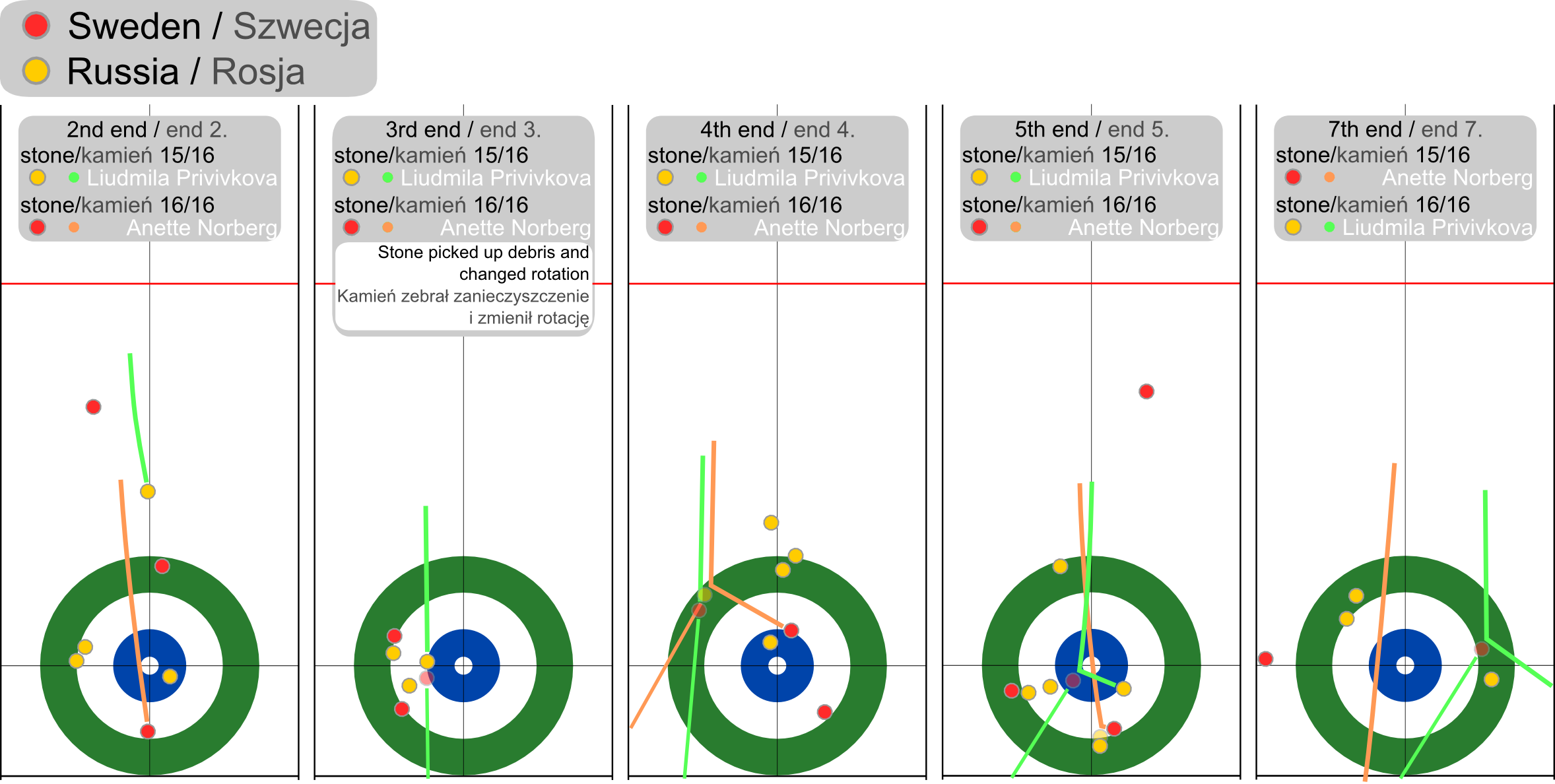

Saturday, February 20, 2:00 p.m.

Sheet A	1	2	3	4	5	6	7	8	9	10	Final
Sweden (Norberg)	0	0	0	0	0	1	0	x	x	x	1
Russia (Privivkova) 🔨	0	1	3	1	2	0	3	x	x	x	10

Sheet B	1	2	3	4	5	6	7	8	9	10	11	Final
United States (McCormick)	0	0	0	1	1	1	0	0	1	1	1	6
Great Britain (Muirhead) 🔨	1	0	2	0	0	0	2	0	0	0	0	5

Sheet C	1	2	3	4	5	6	7	8	9	10	Final
Denmark (Jensen) 🔨	2	1	0	2	0	0	1	1	0	0	7
Switzerland (Ott)	0	0	2	0	2	1	0	0	2	1	8

Sheet D	1	2	3	4	5	6	7	8	9	10	11	Final
Germany (Schöpp)	0	1	0	2	0	2	0	1	0	1	0	7
China (Wang) 🔨	1	0	1	0	2	0	2	0	1	0	2	9

=== Draw 8 ===
Sunday, February 21, 9:00 a.m.

Sheet A	1	2	3	4	5	6	7	8	9	10	Final
Great Britain (Muirhead)	0	1	0	0	1	0	3	1	0	x	6
Switzerland (Ott) 🔨	2	0	2	4	0	1	0	0	1	x	10

Sheet B	1	2	3	4	5	6	7	8	9	10	Final
Germany (Schöpp)	0	0	1	0	0	0	1	0	3	0	5
Denmark (Jensen) 🔨	0	3	0	0	0	1	0	1	0	1	6

Sheet C	1	2	3	4	5	6	7	8	9	10	Final
Canada (Bernard)	0	0	4	0	2	0	3	x	x	x	9
United States (McCormick) 🔨	0	1	0	0	0	1	0	x	x	x	2

Sheet D	1	2	3	4	5	6	7	8	9	10	11	Final
Russia (Privivkova)	0	0	0	3	3	0	0	2	0	1	0	9
Japan (Meguro) 🔨	0	0	0	0	0	3	3	0	3	0	3	12

=== Draw 9 ===
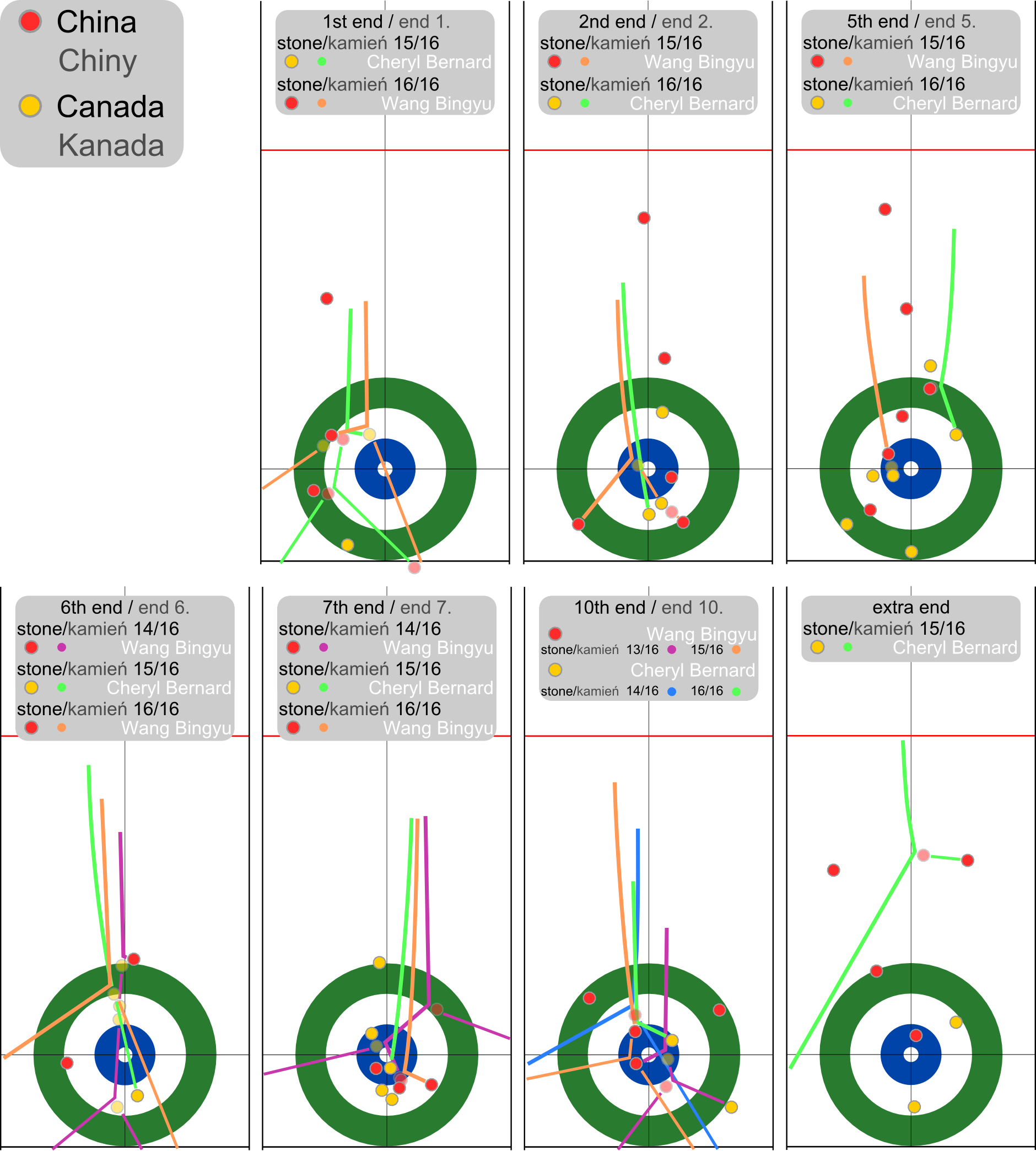

Sunday, February 21, 7:00 p.m.

Sheet B	1	2	3	4	5	6	7	8	9	10	11	Final
China (Wang) 🔨	2	1	0	1	0	0	0	1	0	0	1	6
Canada (Bernard)	0	0	1	0	1	1	1	0	0	1	0	5

Sheet C	1	2	3	4	5	6	7	8	9	10	Final
Japan (Meguro)	0	0	0	1	0	2	0	1	0	2	6
Germany (Schöpp) 🔨	0	2	1	0	1	0	1	0	2	0	7

Sheet D	1	2	3	4	5	6	7	8	9	10	Final
United States (McCormick)	0	0	1	0	1	0	1	0	0	x	3
Sweden (Norberg) 🔨	1	0	0	2	0	3	0	0	3	x	9

=== Draw 10 ===
Monday, February 22, 2:00 p.m.

Sheet A	1	2	3	4	5	6	7	8	9	10	Final
Russia (Sidorova)	0	0	3	0	1	0	1	1	1	x	7
China (Wang) 🔨	1	0	0	1	0	2	0	0	0	x	4

Sheet B	1	2	3	4	5	6	7	8	9	10	Final
Japan (Meguro) 🔨	1	0	1	0	1	0	1	0	x	x	4
Switzerland (Ott)	0	2	0	4	0	2	0	2	x	x	10

Sheet C	1	2	3	4	5	6	7	8	9	10	Final
Sweden (Norberg)	0	0	0	0	1	0	0	0	1	x	2
Canada (Bernard) 🔨	0	2	1	1	0	0	1	1	0	x	6

Sheet D	1	2	3	4	5	6	7	8	9	10	Final
Great Britain (Muirhead)	0	3	0	2	0	1	0	1	0	1	8
Denmark (Jensen) 🔨	1	0	2	0	1	0	3	0	2	0	9

=== Draw 11 ===
Tuesday, February 23, 9:00 a.m.

Sheet A	1	2	3	4	5	6	7	8	9	10	Final
Japan (Meguro)	0	1	0	1	0	3	0	1	0	x	6
Sweden (Norberg) 🔨	2	0	3	0	1	0	2	0	2	x	10

Sheet B	1	2	3	4	5	6	7	8	9	10	Final
Switzerland (Ott)	0	0	0	0	1	1	0	1	1	x	4
Germany (Schöpp) 🔨	0	0	1	0	0	0	1	0	0	x	2

Sheet C	1	2	3	4	5	6	7	8	9	10	Final
United States (McCormick)	0	1	1	0	0	2	0	1	0	0	5
China (Wang) 🔨	1	0	0	2	1	0	1	0	0	1	6

Sheet D	1	2	3	4	5	6	7	8	9	10	11	Final
Canada (Bernard)	0	1	0	1	0	1	1	1	0	0	1	6
Great Britain (Muirhead) 🔨	0	0	2	0	0	0	0	0	2	1	0	5

=== Draw 12 ===
Tuesday, February 23, 7:00 p.m.

Sheet A	1	2	3	4	5	6	7	8	9	10	Final
Switzerland (Ott)	0	0	2	1	3	1	3	x	x	x	10
United States (McCormick) 🔨	1	2	0	0	0	0	0	x	x	x	3

Sheet B	1	2	3	4	5	6	7	8	9	10	Final
Canada (Bernard)	0	0	0	1	0	4	0	1	1	x	7
Russia (Sidorova) 🔨	0	1	0	0	1	0	1	0	0	x	3

Sheet C	1	2	3	4	5	6	7	8	9	10	Final
Japan (Meguro)	0	0	0	2	0	2	0	0	1	x	5
Denmark (Jensen) 🔨	0	0	3	0	1	0	0	3	0	x	7

Sheet D	1	2	3	4	5	6	7	8	9	10	Final
Sweden (Norberg) 🔨	2	0	3	0	2	0	1	0	0	0	8
Germany (Schöpp)	0	2	0	2	0	0	0	2	0	1	7

== Medal Round ==
Semi-final
1	Canada	6
4	Switzerland	5
2	Sweden	9
3	China	4

Final
1	Canada	6
2	Sweden	7
Bronze medal game
4	Switzerland	6
3	China	12

=== Semifinals ===
Thursday, February 25, 9:00 a.m.

Team	1	2	3	4	5	6	7	8	9	10	Final
Canada (Bernard) 🔨	1	0	2	0	0	2	0	0	1	0	6
Switzerland (Ott)	0	1	0	1	1	0	0	1	0	1	5

Player percentages
Canada		Switzerland	
Cori Bartel	83%	Janine Greiner	83%
Carolyn Darbyshire	75%	Carmen Küng	85%
Susan O'Connor	80%	Carmen Schäfer	83%
Cheryl Bernard	74%	Mirjam Ott	66%
Total	78%	Total	79%

Team	1	2	3	4	5	6	7	8	9	10	Final
China (Wang)	0	0	0	1	0	1	1	0	1	x	4
Sweden (Norberg) 🔨	1	1	1	0	3	0	0	3	0	x	9

Player percentages
China		Sweden	
Zhou Yan	92%	Anna Le Moine	81%
Yue Qingshuang	85%	Cathrine Lindahl	88%
Yin Liu	71%	Eva Lund	75%
Wang Bingyu	60%	Anette Norberg	75%
Total	77%	Total	80%

=== Bronze medal final ===
Friday, February 26, 9:00 a.m.

Team	1	2	3	4	5	6	7	8	9	10	Final
China (Wang) 🔨	3	0	2	0	1	0	2	4	x	x	12
Switzerland (Ott)	0	1	0	3	0	2	0	0	x	x	6

Player percentages
China		Switzerland	
Zhou Yan	84%	Janine Greiner	80%
Yue Qingshuang	83%	Carmen Küng	81%
Yin Liu	89%	Carmen Schäfer	89%
Wang Bingyu	88%	Mirjam Ott	59%
Total	86%	Total	77%

=== Gold medal final ===
Friday, February 26, 3:00 p.m.

Sheet C	1	2	3	4	5	6	7	8	9	10	11	Final
Canada (Bernard) 🔨	0	1	0	1	0	1	2	0	1	0	0	6
Sweden (Norberg)	0	0	2	0	2	0	0	0	0	2	1	7

Player percentages
Canada		Sweden	
Cori Bartel	89%	Anna Le Moine	90%
Carolyn Darbyshire	84%	Cathrine Lindahl	77%
Susan O'Connor	80%	Eva Lund	78%
Cheryl Bernard	82%	Anette Norberg	78%
Total	84%	Total	81%
