= Moe Meguro =

Japanese curler

Moe Meguro 目黒 萌絵
- Curler
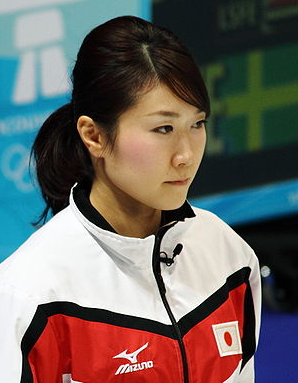
- Born: November 20, 1984 (age 41); Kushiro, Hokkaido, Hokkaidō

Curling career
- World Championship: 3 (2007, 2008, 2010)
- Pacific-Asia Championship: 5 (2004, 2006, 2007, 2008, 2009)
Medal record
Women's curling
Representing Japan
Pacific Championships
Gold medal – first place	2004 Chuncheon
Silver medal – second place	2009 Karuizawa
Silver medal – second place	2007 Beijing
Bronze medal – third place	2008 Naseby
Bronze medal – third place	2006 Tokyo
Winter Universiade
Bronze medal – third place	2007 Pinerolo

Moe Meguro (目黒 萌絵, Meguro Moe) is a Japanese curler. She was born November 20, 1984, in Kushiro, Hokkaido, but grew up in Minamifurano, Hokkaido.

== Career ==
Moe Meguro won her first medal at the international level at the 2004 Pacific Curling Championships winning the gold medal. She played lead under skip Yumie Hayashi.

Team Aomori was selected to represent Japan at the 2006 Winter Olympics. At the Games she threw first under skip Ayumi Onodera.

At the 2006 Pacific Curling Championships in Tokyo, Moe Meguro skipped Team Aomori and won a bronze medal. She also won a bronze medal at the 2007 Winter Universiade and a silver medal at the 2007 Pacific Curling Championships finishing the tournament with an 8–1 record.

At the 2008 Ford World Women's Curling Championship, Meguro skipped the Japanese team to 4th place (one of Japan's best ever finishes, Japan also finished 4th in 1997). The team was one shot away from the gold medal final, but let Canada steal a point in the 10th and 11th ends of their semi-final game. In the bronze medal game, they lost to Switzerland, in a re-match of the 3 vs. 4 game which the Japanese had won.

Moe Meguro won the bronze medal at the 2008 Pacific Curling Championships and the silver medal in 2009, losing the final to China skipped by Wang Bingyu.

She was also skip for Team Japan at the 2010 Winter Olympics (finishing the round robin stage with a 3–6 record) and the 2010 Ford World Women's Curling Championship (finishing 11th with a disappointing 2–9 record).

She announced her retirement in June 2010.

== Teammates ==
2010 Vancouver Olympic Games

- Kotomi Ishizaki, Lead
- Mari Motohashi, Second
- Anna Ohmiya, Third
- Mayo Yamaura, Alternate

2006 Torino Olympic Games

- Ayumi Onodera, Skip
- Mari Motohashi, Second
- Yumie Hayashi, Third
- Sakurako Terada, Alternate

== Grand Slam record ==
Event	2006–07	2007–08	2008–09
Autumn Gold	Q	Q	Q
Casinos of Winnipeg	DNP	DNP	DNP

Key

- C - Champion
- F - Lost final
- SF - Lost semi final
- QF - Lost quarter final
- Q - Did not make playoffs
- DNP - Did not participate in event
- N/A - not a Grand Slam event that season
