= 2008 World Women's Curling Championship =

2008 Ford World Women's Curling Championship
- Host city: Vernon, British Columbia, Canada
- Arena: Wesbild Centre
- Dates: March 22–30, 2008
- Winner: Canada
- Curling club: St. Vital CC, Winnipeg
- Skip: Jennifer Jones
- Third: Cathy Overton-Clapham
- Second: Jill Officer
- Lead: Dawn Askin
- Alternate: Jennifer Clark-Rouire
- Coach: Janet Arnott
- Finalist: China (Wang Bingyu)

The 2008 World Women's Curling Championship (branded as 2008 Ford World Women's Curling Championship for sponsorship reasons) was held from March 22 to March 30, 2008 at the Wesbild Centre in Vernon, British Columbia, Canada. This championship also served as one of the qualifiers for the 2010 Winter Olympics.

== Teams ==
Canada	China	Czech Republic
St. Vital CC, Winnipeg Skip: Jennifer Jones; Third: Cathy Overton-Clapham; Second: Jill Officer; Lead: Dawn Askin; Alternate: Jennifer Clark-Rouire	Harbin CC, Harbin Skip: Wang Bingyu; Third: Liu Yin; Second: Yue Qingshuang; Lead: Zhou Yan; Alternate: Liu Jinli	CC Dion, Prague Skip: Lenka Černovská*; Fourth: Kateřina Urbanová; Second: Jana Šafaříková; Lead: Sára Jahodová; Alternate: Jana Šimmerová (*Throws third rocks)
Denmark	Germany	Italy
Tårnby CC, Tårnby Skip: Angelina Jensen*; Fourth: Madeleine Dupont; Third: Denise Dupont; Lead: Camilla Jensen; Alternate: Ane Hansen (*Throws second rocks)	SC Riessersee, Garmisch-Partenkirchen Skip: Andrea Schöpp; Third: Monika Wagner; Second: Anna Hartelt; Lead: Marie-Therese Rotter; Alternate: Melanie Robillard	CC Dolomiti, Cortina d'Ampezzo Skip: Diana Gaspari; Third: Giorgia Apollonio; Second: Elettra De Col; Lead: Violetta Caldart; Alternate: Lucrezia Laurenti
Japan	Russia	Scotland
Aomori CC, Aomori Skip: Moe Meguro; Third: Mari Motohashi; Second: Mayo Yamaura; Lead: Kotomi Ishizaki; Alternate: Anna Ohmiya	Moskvitch CC, Moscow Skip: Ludmila Privivkova; Third: Olga Jarkova; Second: Nkeiruka Ezekh; Lead: Ekaterina Galkina; Alternate: Margarita Fomina	Stranraer Ice Rink, Stranraer Skip: Gail Munro; Third: Lyndsay Wilson; Second: Karen Addison; Lead: Anne Laird; Alternate: Lynn Cameron
Sweden	Switzerland	United States
Skellefteå CK, Skellefteå Skip: Stina Viktorsson; Third: Maria Prytz; Second: Maria Wennerström; Lead: Margaretha Sigfridsson; Alternate: Sabina Kraupp	Davos CC, Davos Skip: Mirjam Ott; Third: Carmen Schäfer; Second: Valeria Spälty; Lead: Janine Greiner; Alternate: Carmen Küng	Madison CC, Madison Skip: Debbie McCormick; Third: Allison Pottinger; Second: Nicole Joraanstad; Lead: Natalie Nicholson; Alternate: Tracy Sachtjen

== Round-robin standings ==
Key
Teams to playoffs
Teams to tiebreaker

Locale	Skip	W	L	PF	PA	Ends Won	Ends Lost	Blank Ends	Stolen Ends	Shot Pct.
China	Wang Bingyu	9	2	92	67	57	43	6	18	80%
Canada	Jennifer Jones	9	2	88	62	46	43	13	9	84%
Switzerland	Mirjam Ott	9	2	90	64	51	46	7	11	81%
Japan	Moe Meguro	7	4	75	66	49	45	17	13	77%
Denmark	Angelina Jensen	7	4	73	68	44	51	16	7	79%
Sweden	Stina Viktorsson	6	5	68	72	45	51	10	7	80%
United States	Debbie McCormick	6	5	71	74	51	52	6	13	78%
Russia	Ludmila Privivkova	4	7	67	74	45	48	11	12	78%
Germany	Andrea Schöpp	4	7	63	70	49	45	17	14	77%
Scotland	Gail Munro	3	8	59	77	43	48	17	8	77%
Italy	Diana Gaspari	2	9	60	77	45	47	14	10	74%
Czech Republic	Kateřina Urbanová	0	11	48	83	40	46	16	10	72%

== Round-robin results ==
=== Draw 1 ===
March 22, 13:00

Sheet A	1	2	3	4	5	6	7	8	9	10	Final
Russia (Privivkova)	0	1	0	1	0	4	0	0	0	1	7
Scotland (Munro) 🔨	0	0	1	0	2	0	3	0	2	0	8

Sheet B	1	2	3	4	5	6	7	8	9	10	Final
Denmark (Jensen)	0	3	0	1	0	2	0	2	0	0	8
United States (McCormick) 🔨	2	0	1	0	1	0	1	0	1	1	7

Sheet C	1	2	3	4	5	6	7	8	9	10	Final
Japan (Meguro)	0	0	5	0	0	0	2	0	0	2	9
Italy (Gaspari) 🔨	1	1	0	0	4	0	0	1	1	0	8

Sheet D	1	2	3	4	5	6	7	8	9	10	Final
Sweden (Viktorsson)	0	1	0	0	1	0	3	0	0	X	5
China (Wang) 🔨	2	0	2	0	0	1	0	3	3	X	11

=== Draw 2 ===
March 22, 18:00

Sheet A	1	2	3	4	5	6	7	8	9	10	Final
Italy (Gaspari) 🔨	0	2	0	1	0	1	0	0	1	1	6
Denmark (Jensen)	0	0	3	0	1	0	3	1	0	0	8

Sheet B	1	2	3	4	5	6	7	8	9	10	Final
Canada (Jones) 🔨	2	0	0	1	0	1	0	0	1	1	6
Switzerland (Ott)	0	0	1	0	1	0	0	1	0	0	3

Sheet C	1	2	3	4	5	6	7	8	9	10	11	Final
Germany (Schöpp) 🔨	0	1	0	0	1	0	0	1	1	0	1	5
Czech Republic (Urbanova)	0	0	0	1	0	1	1	0	0	1	0	4

Sheet D	1	2	3	4	5	6	7	8	9	10	Final
Japan (Meguro)	0	1	1	0	0	1	0	1	0	X	4
United States (McCormick) 🔨	3	0	0	0	1	0	3	0	1	X	8

=== Draw 3 ===
March 23, 10:30

Sheet B	1	2	3	4	5	6	7	8	9	10	Final
China (Wang) 🔨	1	0	0	3	0	0	1	0	1	2	8
Russia (Privivkova)	0	4	1	0	0	1	0	1	0	0	7

Sheet C	1	2	3	4	5	6	7	8	9	10	Final
Sweden (Viktorsson)	0	1	0	2	0	1	2	0	2	1	9
Scotland (Munro) 🔨	2	0	1	0	1	0	0	1	0	0	5

=== Draw 4 ===
March 23, 16:00

Sheet A	1	2	3	4	5	6	7	8	9	10	11	Final
Switzerland (Ott)	0	3	0	3	0	2	1	0	2	0	1	12
Germany (Schöpp) 🔨	3	0	1	0	3	0	0	1	0	3	0	11

Sheet B	1	2	3	4	5	6	7	8	9	10	Final
United States (McCormick) 🔨	0	1	0	1	0	2	0	1	1	0	6
Italy (Gaspari)	0	0	1	0	1	0	2	0	0	1	5

Sheet C	1	2	3	4	5	6	7	8	9	10	Final
Denmark (Jensen)	0	1	0	0	2	2	0	0	1	0	6
Japan (Meguro) 🔨	2	0	2	0	0	0	2	1	0	1	8

Sheet D	1	2	3	4	5	6	7	8	9	10	Final
Canada (Jones)	0	3	2	0	6	0	X	X	X	X	11
Czech Republic (Urbanova) 🔨	1	0	0	2	0	1	X	X	X	X	4

=== Draw 5 ===
March 23, 20:00

Sheet A	1	2	3	4	5	6	7	8	9	10	Final
Scotland (Munro)	0	0	0	2	0	0	0	1	1	X	4
China (Wang) 🔨	0	4	0	0	1	2	1	0	0	X	8

Sheet B	1	2	3	4	5	6	7	8	9	10	Final
Germany (Schöpp) 🔨	2	0	1	0	2	0	1	0	X	X	6
Canada (Jones)	0	2	0	5	0	1	0	3	X	X	11

Sheet C	1	2	3	4	5	6	7	8	9	10	Final
Czech Republic (Urbanova)	0	1	0	0	0	2	1	0	1	X	5
Switzerland (Ott) 🔨	1	0	2	3	1	0	0	2	0	X	9

Sheet D	1	2	3	4	5	6	7	8	9	10	Final
Russia (Privivkova)	0	1	1	0	1	1	0	2	0	X	6
Sweden (Viktorsson) 🔨	1	0	0	1	0	0	2	0	1	X	5

=== Draw 6 ===
March 24, 8:30

Sheet A	1	2	3	4	5	6	7	8	9	10	Final
Sweden (Viktorsson)	0	2	0	2	0	0	1	0	0	1	6
Japan (Meguro) 🔨	1	0	1	0	1	1	0	1	0	0	5

Sheet B	1	2	3	4	5	6	7	8	9	10	11	Final
China (Wang)	1	1	0	1	1	0	1	0	3	0	1	9
Denmark (Jensen)	0	0	3	0	0	2	0	1	0	2	0	8

Sheet C	1	2	3	4	5	6	7	8	9	10	Final
Russia (Privivkova)	0	0	0	1	0	1	0	1	1	0	4
Italy (Gaspari) 🔨	0	0	1	0	2	0	1	0	0	1	5

Sheet D	1	2	3	4	5	6	7	8	9	10	Final
Scotland (Munro)	2	0	1	1	0	0	1	0	2	0	7
United States (McCormick) 🔨	0	1	0	0	3	1	0	2	0	2	9

=== Draw 7 ===
March 24, 1:00 PM

Sheet A	1	2	3	4	5	6	7	8	9	10	Final
Denmark (Jensen)	0	1	3	0	0	0	0	0	0	3	7
Czech Republic (Urbanova) 🔨	1	0	0	3	0	0	0	1	1	0	6

Sheet B	1	2	3	4	5	6	7	8	9	10	Final
Japan (Meguro)	0	1	2	0	0	1	0	2	0	0	6
Switzerland (Ott) 🔨	2	0	0	0	1	0	4	0	1	1	9

Sheet C	1	2	3	4	5	6	7	8	9	10	Final
United States (McCormick) 🔨	0	1	1	0	2	0	0	2	0	0	6
Germany (Schöpp)	0	0	0	1	0	0	1	0	1	1	4

Sheet D	1	2	3	4	5	6	7	8	9	10	Final
Italy (Gaspari) 🔨	1	0	0	3	0	2	0	0	0	X	6
Canada (Jones)	0	1	1	0	3	0	0	2	2	X	9

=== Draw 8 ===
March 24, 18:30

Sheet A	1	2	3	4	5	6	7	8	9	10	Final
Canada (Jones) 🔨	0	0	3	0	2	0	0	3	0	1	9
Russia (Privivkova)	1	1	0	2	0	1	0	0	1	0	6

Sheet B	1	2	3	4	5	6	7	8	9	10	Final
Germany (Schöpp) 🔨	0	2	0	1	0	1	0	0	1	1	6
Scotland (Munro)	0	0	1	0	1	0	1	1	0	0	4

Sheet C	1	2	3	4	5	6	7	8	9	10	Final
Switzerland (Ott) 🔨	2	1	0	0	2	1	0	1	0	0	7
Sweden (Viktorsson)	0	0	1	0	0	0	3	0	1	1	6

Sheet D	1	2	3	4	5	6	7	8	9	10	Final
Czech Republic (Urbanová) 🔨	1	0	1	0	0	1	0	0	1	1	5
China (Wang)	0	1	0	2	1	0	2	1	0	0	7

=== Draw 9 ===
March 25, 8:30

Sheet A	1	2	3	4	5	6	7	8	9	10	Final
Switzerland (Ott) 🔨	3	0	0	1	0	0	3	0	1	X	8
Scotland (Munro)	0	1	1	0	1	0	0	1	0	X	4

Sheet B	1	2	3	4	5	6	7	8	9	10	Final
Czech Republic (Urbanová) 🔨	0	1	0	2	0	1	0	X	X	X	4
Russia (Privivkova)	3	0	1	0	3	0	4	X	X	X	11

Sheet C	1	2	3	4	5	6	7	8	9	10	Final
Canada (Jones)	0	0	1	0	3	1	0	2	0	0	7
China (Wang) 🔨	1	2	0	1	0	0	2	0	1	2	9

Sheet D	1	2	3	4	5	6	7	8	9	10	Final
Germany (Schöpp) 🔨	0	1	0	1	1	1	0	0	2	2	8
Sweden (Viktorsson)	0	0	1	0	0	0	1	1	0	0	3

=== Draw 10 ===
March 25 13:00

Sheet A	1	2	3	4	5	6	7	8	9	10	Final
China (Wang) 🔨	1	1	0	3	2	1	2	X	X	X	10
United States (McCormick)	0	0	1	0	0	0	0	X	X	X	1

Sheet B	1	2	3	4	5	6	7	8	9	10	Final
Sweden (Viktorsson)	0	2	0	2	0	3	0	1	0	X	8
Italy (Gaspari) 🔨	1	0	2	0	1	0	2	0	1	X	7

Sheet C	1	2	3	4	5	6	7	8	9	10	Final
Scotland (Munro) 🔨	0	0	2	0	2	0	1	0	1	0	6
Denmark (Jensen)	0	0	0	3	0	1	0	2	0	1	7

Sheet D	1	2	3	4	5	6	7	8	9	10	Final
Russia (Privivkova) 🔨	1	0	0	0	2	0	2	0	0	X	5
Japan (Meguro)	0	0	2	1	0	3	0	2	2	X	10

=== Draw 11 ===
March 25, 18:00

Sheet A	1	2	3	4	5	6	7	8	9	10	Final
Italy (Gaspari)	0	0	1	1	0	0	0	0	1	0	3
Germany (Schöpp) 🔨	0	0	0	0	1	1	1	1	0	1	5

Sheet B	1	2	3	4	5	6	7	8	9	10	Final
United States (McCormick) 🔨	2	0	1	3	0	1	0	0	2	0	9
Canada (Jones)	0	1	0	0	3	0	3	1	0	2	10

Sheet C	1	2	3	4	5	6	7	8	9	10	11	Final
Japan (Meguro)	0	1	0	1	0	0	0	2	0	0	1	5
Czech Republic (Urbanová) 🔨	1	0	0	0	0	1	0	0	0	2	0	4

Sheet D	1	2	3	4	5	6	7	8	9	10	Final
Denmark (Jensen)	0	1	0	2	1	0	1	1	0	3	9
Switzerland (Ott) 🔨	2	0	2	0	0	2	0	0	1	0	7

=== Draw 12 ===
March 26, 8:30 AM

Sheet A	1	2	3	4	5	6	7	8	9	10	11	Final
Japan (Meguro) 🔨	0	1	0	0	0	1	0	1	0	1	0	4
Canada (Jones)	0	0	1	0	1	0	1	0	1	0	3	7

Sheet B	1	2	3	4	5	6	7	8	9	10	11	Final
Denmark (Jensen) 🔨	0	1	0	1	1	0	1	0	0	0	1	5
Germany (Schöpp)	0	0	1	0	0	1	0	1	0	1	0	4

Sheet C	1	2	3	4	5	6	7	8	9	10	Final
Italy (Gaspari)	1	0	0	0	0	1	0	X	X	X	2
Switzerland (Ott) 🔨	0	1	2	2	2	0	3	X	X	X	10

Sheet D	1	2	3	4	5	6	7	8	9	10	Final
United States (McCormick)	0	0	0	0	2	1	0	2	2	0	7
Czech Republic (Urbanová) 🔨	1	1	1	1	0	0	1	0	0	1	6

=== Draw 13 ===
March 26, 13:00

Sheet A	1	2	3	4	5	6	7	8	9	10	Final
Czech Republic (Urbanová)	0	0	0	1	1	1	0	0	0	X	3
Sweden (Viktorsson) 🔨	3	0	1	0	0	0	0	0	3	X	7

Sheet B	1	2	3	4	5	6	7	8	9	10	Final
Switzerland (Ott) 🔨	1	0	0	2	0	1	0	5	0	X	9
China (Wang)	0	1	1	0	1	0	2	0	2	X	7

Sheet C	1	2	3	4	5	6	7	8	9	10	Final
Germany (Schöpp)	1	0	0	0	1	2	0	0	2	0	6
Russia (Privivkova) 🔨	0	2	1	1	0	0	2	1	0	0	7

Sheet D	1	2	3	4	5	6	7	8	9	10	Final
Canada (Jones)	0	0	4	0	1	0	1	0	0	2	8
Scotland (Munro) 🔨	0	2	0	1	0	2	0	0	1	0	6

=== Draw 14 ===
March 26, 18:00

Sheet A	1	2	3	4	5	6	7	8	9	10	Final
Russia (Privivkova)	0	0	1	0	0	1	0	0	1	1	4
Denmark (Jensen) 🔨	0	1	0	0	1	0	0	1	0	0	3

Sheet B	1	2	3	4	5	6	7	8	9	10	Final
Scotland (Munro) 🔨	0	0	0	1	0	0	0	1	0	X	2
Japan (Meguro)	0	1	1	0	1	1	1	0	2	X	7

Sheet C	1	2	3	4	5	6	7	8	9	10	11	Final
Sweden (Viktorsson) 🔨	1	0	2	0	0	2	0	1	0	1	1	8
United States (McCormick)	0	2	0	2	1	0	1	0	1	0	0	7

Sheet D	1	2	3	4	5	6	7	8	9	10	Final
China (Wang) 🔨	1	0	3	0	2	0	0	1	0	3	10
Italy (Gaspari)	0	1	0	2	0	1	2	0	2	0	8

=== Draw 15 ===
March 27, 8:30

Sheet A	1	2	3	4	5	6	7	8	9	10	Final
United States (McCormick)	1	0	1	0	0	1	0	1	0	X	4
Switzerland (Ott) 🔨	0	1	0	3	1	0	1	0	1	X	7

Sheet B	1	2	3	4	5	6	7	8	9	10	Final
Italy (Gaspari) 🔨	0	0	1	0	1	1	1	0	1	1	6
Czech Republic (Urbanova)	0	0	0	2	0	0	0	1	0	0	3

Sheet C	1	2	3	4	5	6	7	8	9	10	Final
Denmark (Jensen) 🔨	0	0	0	3	0	2	0	0	1	X	6
Canada (Jones)	0	0	0	0	1	0	1	1	0	X	3

Sheet D	1	2	3	4	5	6	7	8	9	10	Final
Japan (Meguro) 🔨	2	0	0	1	0	0	0	2	0	4	9
Germany (Schöpp)	0	0	0	0	2	1	0	0	1	0	4

=== Draw 16 ===
March 27, 13:00

Sheet A	1	2	3	4	5	6	7	8	9	10	11	Final
Scotland (Munro)	0	1	0	1	0	1	0	0	1	0	1	5
Italy (Gaspari) 🔨	1	0	0	0	1	0	0	0	0	2	0	4

Sheet B	1	2	3	4	5	6	7	8	9	10	11	Final
Russia (Privivkova)	0	0	2	0	1	0	2	0	1	0	0	6
United States (McCormick) 🔨	1	1	0	1	0	1	0	1	0	1	1	7

Sheet C	1	2	3	4	5	6	7	8	9	10	11	Final
China (Wang)	1	0	1	0	0	2	0	1	1	1	0	7
Japan (Meguro) 🔨	0	1	0	1	3	0	2	0	0	0	1	8

Sheet D	1	2	3	4	5	6	7	8	9	10	Final
Sweden (Viktorsson) 🔨	0	3	0	0	2	0	1	1	0	1	8
Denmark (Jensen)	0	0	2	1	0	1	0	0	2	0	6

=== Draw 17 ===
March 27, 18:00

Sheet A	1	2	3	4	5	6	7	8	9	10	Final
Germany (Schöpp) 🔨	1	1	0	1	0	1	0	1	0	0	5
China (Wang)	0	0	3	0	1	0	2	0	0	0	6

Sheet B	1	2	3	4	5	6	7	8	9	10	Final
Canada (Jones) 🔨	2	0	0	0	1	1	0	3	0	X	7
Sweden (Viktorsson)	0	1	0	0	0	0	1	0	1	X	3

Sheet C	1	2	3	4	5	6	7	8	9	10	Final
Czech Republic (Urbanova)	0	0	1	0	0	2	0	0	1	X	4
Scotland (Munro) 🔨	0	1	0	0	3	0	3	1	0	X	8

Sheet D	1	2	3	4	5	6	7	8	9	10	Final
Switzerland (Ott) 🔨	3	0	1	0	3	1	0	1	X	X	9
Russia (Privivkova)	0	1	0	2	0	0	1	0	X	X	4

== Tiebreaker ==
Sheet A	1	2	3	4	5	6	7	8	9	10	Final
Denmark (Jensen)	0	0	0	0	1	1	0	1	0	X	3
Japan (Meguro) 🔨	0	1	1	2	0	0	2	0	1	X	7

Player Percentages
Japan		Denmark	
Kotomi Ishizaki	76%	Camilla Jensen	76%
Mayo Yamaura	76%	Angelina Jensen	76%
Mari Motohashi	76%	Denise Dupont	92%
Moe Meguro	79%	Madeleine Dupont	74%
Total	77%	Total	80%

== Playoffs ==
Page playoff system
1	China	7
2	Canada	5
3	Switzerland	4
4	Japan	6

Semifinal
2	Canada	9
4	Japan	8

Gold Medal Game
1	China	4
2	Canada	7
Bronze Medal Game
3	Switzerland	9
4	Japan	7

=== 3 vs. 4 ===
Sheet B	1	2	3	4	5	6	7	8	9	10	Final
Switzerland (Ott) 🔨	0	1	0	0	0	0	0	2	1	0	4
Japan (Meguro)	0	0	2	1	1	1	0	0	0	1	6

Player Percentages
Switzerland		Japan	
Janine Greiner	93%	Kotomi Ishizaki	79%
Valeria Spälty	80%	Mayo Yamaura	73%
Carmen Schäfer	84%	Mari Motohashi	94%
Mirjam Ott	69%	Moe Meguro	75%
Total	81%	Total	80%

=== 1 vs. 2 ===
Sheet B	1	2	3	4	5	6	7	8	9	10	Final
China (Wang) 🔨	1	1	2	0	2	0	1	0	0	X	7
Canada (Jones)	0	0	0	1	0	2	0	1	1	X	5

Player Percentages
China		Canada	
Zhou Yan	79%	Dawn Askin	94%
Yue Qingshuang	88%	Jill Officer	90%
Liu Yin	93%	Cathy Overton-Clapham	85%
Wang Bingyu	83%	Jennifer Jones	79%
Total	85%	Total	87%

=== Semifinal ===
Sheet B	1	2	3	4	5	6	7	8	9	10	11	Final
Canada (Jones) 🔨	1	0	1	0	1	0	2	0	2	1	1	9
Japan (Meguro)	0	2	0	1	0	3	0	2	0	0	0	8

Player Percentages
Canada		Japan	
Dawn Askin	92%	Kotomi Ishizaki	88%
Jill Officer	85%	Mayo Yamaura	92%
Cathy Overton-Clapham	90%	Mari Motohashi	83%
Jennifer Jones	83%	Moe Meguro	72%
Total	88%	Total	84%

=== Bronze medal game ===
Sheet B	1	2	3	4	5	6	7	8	9	10	Final
Japan (Meguro) 🔨	0	2	0	0	0	2	1	2	0	X	7
Switzerland (Ott)	3	0	2	2	1	0	0	0	1	X	9

Player Percentages
Switzerland		Japan	
Janine Greiner	91%	Kotomi Ishizaki	91%
Valeria Spälty	79%	Mayo Yamaura	88%
Carmen Schäfer	86%	Mari Motohashi	81%
Mirjam Ott	73%	Moe Meguro	54%
Total	82%	Total	79%

=== Gold medal game ===
Sheet B	1	2	3	4	5	6	7	8	9	10	Final
Canada (Jones)	0	3	0	1	0	0	2	0	1	X	7
China (Wang) 🔨	1	0	1	0	1	0	0	1	0	X	4

Player Percentages
China		Canada	
Zhou Yan	84%	Dawn Askin	90%
Yue Qingshuang	85%	Jill Officer	89%
Liu Yin	70%	Cathy Overton-Clapham	86%
Wang Bingyu	81%	Jennifer Jones	85%
Total	80%	Total	88%

2008 Ford World Women's Curling Championship Winners
(Canada)
Canada
15th title

== Player percentages ==
Top five percentages per position during the round robin.

Leads	%	Seconds	%	Thirds	%	Skips	%
(Canada) Dawn Askin	89	(Canada) Jill Officer	84	(Canada) Cathy Overton-Clapham	81	(Canada) Jennifer Jones	82
(Russia) Ekaterina Galkina	87	(Scotland) Karen Addison	82	(Switzerland) Carmen Schäfer	81	(China) Wang Bingyu	80
(Sweden) Margaretha Sigfridsson	86	(United States) Nicole Joraanstad	82	(Denmark) Denise Dupont	80	(Sweden) Stina Viktorsson	77
(Switzerland) Janine Greiner	86	(Switzerland) Valeria Spälty	82	(Japan) Mari Motohashi	79	(Switzerland) Mirjam Ott	77
(Denmark) Camilla Jensen	83	(China) Yue Qingshuang	82	(Germany) Monika Wagner	79	(Denmark) Madeleine Dupont	76

== Broadcasts ==
Seven broadcasters presented the games both live and tape-delayed via television and the internet. Eurosport (Europe), NHK (Japan), TSN and CBC (Canada), WCSN and NBCOlympics.com (USA) and CurlTV.com (internet).

== See also ==
- 2008 Brier
- 2008 World Men's Curling Championship
- 2008 World Junior Curling Championships
- 2008 World Mixed Doubles Curling Championship
- 2008 Scotties Tournament of Hearts
