= Kim Mi-yeon =

South Korean curler (born 1979)

- Curler
- Born: October 20, 1979 (age 47); South Korea

Team
- Curling club: Kyung Gido Council, Gyeonggi-do

Curling career
- Member Association: South Korea
- World Championship: 2 (2002, 2009)
- Pacific-Asia Championship: 8 (1998, 2000, 2001, 2002, 2003, 2004, 2007, 2008)
Medal record
Women's curling
Representing South Korea
Pacific Championships
Gold medal – first place	2001 Jeonju
Silver medal – second place	2000 Esquimalt
Silver medal – second place	2002 Queenstown
Silver medal – second place	2003 Aomori
Silver medal – second place	2008 Naseby
Bronze medal – third place	2004 Chuncheon
Bronze medal – third place	2007 Beijing
Asian Winter Games
Silver medal – second place	2003 Aomori

Kim Mi-yeon (born October 20, 1979) is a South Korean curler. She was the skip of the South Korean National Women's Curling Team at the 2002 and 2009 World Curling Championships.

== Career ==
Kim skipped the Korean team to a Pacific Curling Championships gold medal in 2001, earning the Korean team their first ever appearance at the World Curling Championships. At the 2002 Worlds, the team finished last and without a single win, going 0-9.

Kim had a successful 2008–09 season which began with a Strauss Crown of Curling victory in October, and a silver medal at the Pacific Championships. They would play in the 2009 Mount Titlis World Women's Curling Championship as the host team, finishing this time with a 3–8 record.
