= Kotomi Ishizaki =

Japanese curler

- Curler ♀
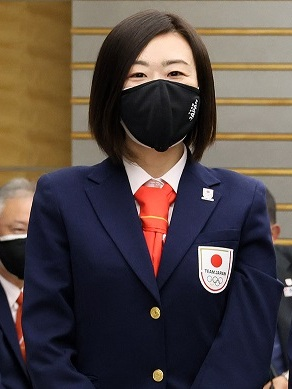
- Born: January 4, 1979 (age 47); Asahikawa, Japan

Team
- Curling club: Loco Solare, Kitami, Hokkaido

Curling career
- Member Association: Japan
- World Championship: 6 (2000, 2003, 2004, 2008, 2010, 2023)
- Pacific-Asia Championship: 10 (2000, 2001, 2002, 2003, 2007, 2008, 2009, 2010, 2015, 2018)
- Pan Continental Championship: 2 (2022, 2023)
- Olympic: 3 (2002, 2010, 2022)
- Grand Slam victories: 1 (2023 Canadian Open)
Medal record
Women's curling
Representing Japan
Olympic Games
Silver medal – second place	2022 Beijing	Team
Pan Continental Curling Championships
Gold medal – first place	2022 Calgary
Silver medal – second place	2023 Kelowna
Pacific-Asia Championships
Gold medal – first place	2000 Esquimalt
Gold medal – first place	2002 Queenstown
Gold medal – first place	2003 Aomori
Gold medal – first place	2015 Almaty
Silver medal – second place	2001 Jeonju
Silver medal – second place	2007 Beijing
Silver medal – second place	2009 Karuizawa
Silver medal – second place	2018 Gangneung
Bronze medal – third place	2008 Naseby
Bronze medal – third place	2010 Uiseong
Representing Hokkaido
Japan Curling Championships
Gold medal – first place	2000 Karuizawa
Gold medal – first place	2003 Karuizawa
Gold medal – first place	2022 Tokoro
Gold medal – first place	2023 Tokoro
Silver medal – second place	2001 Tokoro
Silver medal – second place	2002 Tokoro
Silver medal – second place	2021 Wakkanai
Bronze medal – third place	2004 Moseushi
Representing Aomori
Japan Curling Championships
Gold medal – first place	2008 Karuizawa
Gold medal – first place	2009 Aomori
Gold medal – first place	2010 Tokoro
Silver medal – second place	2011 Nayoro
Bronze medal – third place	2012 Aomori

Kotomi Ishizaki (石崎 琴美, Ishizaki Kotomi; born January 4, 1979) is a Japanese curler from Sapporo. She won a silver medal at the 2022 Winter Olympics as the alternate of the team skipped by Satsuki Fujisawa.

== Career ==
She made her World Championship debut at the 2003 Winnipeg World Championships playing lead for Shinobu Aota's team from Japan. She would return to the world championships in 2004 with the same team.

Her next World Championships came in 2008, where the Japanese women (along with Team China) became the first team from the Pacific region to qualify for the Playoffs at the World Championships. Ishizaki and her team, skipped by Moe Meguro, defeated Team Switzerland in the 3 vs. 4 Playoff match. In the Semifinal, they nearly defeated Team Canada and went to the Bronze Medal match to face a rematch against Team Switzerland. They would lose this match 9 - 7, which would become the second-best performance by a Pacific region team at the Curling World Championships.

Kotomi Ishizaki played Lead position for Team Japan at the 2010 Winter Olympics. and at the 2010 Ford World Women's Curling Championship.

Ishizaki was chosen as an alternate member for Team Japan at the 2022 Winter Olympics, in which they won first-ever silver medals. Ishizaki became the oldest Japanese athlete to win a medal at the Winter Olympics at age 43 years and 1 month, surpassing Noriaki Kasai, who won 2 medals at the 2014 Winter Olympics at age 41 years and 8 months.

== Teammates ==
2022 Beijing Olympic Games

Satsuki Fujisawa, Skip

Chinami Yoshida Third

Yumi Suzuki Second

Yurika Yoshida Lead

2010 Vancouver Olympic Games

Moe Meguro, Skip

Anna Ohmiya, Third

Mari Motohashi, Second

Mayo Yamaura, Alternate

2002 Salt Lake City Olympic Games

Akiko Katoh, Skip

Yumie Hayashi, Third

Ayumi Onodera, Second

Mika Konaka, Lead
