= Yumie Funayama =

Japanese curler

- Curler
- Born: Yumie Hayashi; April 5, 1978 (age 48); Tokoro, Hokkaido

Team
- Curling club: Sapporo CC, Sapporo, Hokkaido

Curling career
- Member Association: Japan
- World Championship: 4 (1999, 2001, 2005, 2021)
- Pacific-Asia Championship: 6 (1998, 2001, 2004, 2013, 2014, 2021)
- Olympic: 3 (2002, 2006, 2014)
Medal record
Women's curling
Representing Japan
Pacific Championships
Gold medal – first place	1998 Qualicum Beach
Gold medal – first place	2004 Chuncheon
Gold medal – first place	2021 Almaty
Silver medal – second place	2001 Jeonju
Bronze medal – third place	2013 Shanghai
Bronze medal – third place	2014 Karuizawa
World Junior Championships
Silver medal – second place	1998 Thunder Bay
Silver medal – second place	1999 Östersund

Yumie Funayama (船山 弓枝, Funayama Yumie) is a Japanese curler, born April 5, 1978, in Tokoro, Hokkaido as Yumie Hayashi (林 弓枝, Hayashi Yumie). She is currently the coach of Sayaka Yoshimura's team from Sapporo, Hokkaido.

== Career ==
At age 12, Funayama began curling in her hometown Tokoro, Hokkaido, joining Akiko Katoh's junior team together with Ayumi Ogasawara (then Onodera). Funayama mainly played third for the Katoh team. The team represented Japan at four World Junior Curling Championships (1996, 1997, 1998 & 1999), winning a silver medal in 1998 and another silver in 1999. The team later represented Japan at the 2002 Winter Olympics, finishing in 8th place with a 2–7 record.

After the 2001-2002 season, Funayama moved from Hokkaido to Aomori and formed a new team with her then-teammate Ayumi Ogasawara (then Onodera), who became the skip of the new team. The team represented Japan at the 2006 Winter Olympics, where Funayama played third and Japan finished 7th with a 4–5 record, including a surprise win over one of the usual curling powerhouses, Canada. After the 2005-2006 season, Funayama and Ogasawara announced their temporary retirement. Funayama got married and had a child before returning to the sport in the 2011-12 season.

In 2011, Funayama and Ogasawara formed a new team in Sapporo, Hokkaido. The team qualified for the 2014 Winter Olympics through the Olympic Qualification Event 2013. At the Olympic Games, Funayama threw third stones under skip Ogasawara, and Japan finished in 5th place with a 4–5 record, winning against two former World Championship teams, Switzerland's Mirjam Ott and China's Wang Bingyu.

== Personal life ==
Funayama is married and has two children. She lives in Sapporo.

== Teammates ==
2002 Salt Lake City Olympic Games

- Akiko Katoh, Skip
- Ayumi Onodera, Second
- Mika Konaka, Lead
- Kotomi Ishizaki, Alternate

2006 Turin Olympic Games

- Ayumi Onodera, Skip
- Mari Motohashi, Second
- Moe Meguro, Lead
- Sakurako Terada, Alternate

2014 Sochi Olympic Games

- Ayumi Ogasawara, Skip
- Kaho Onodera, Second
- Michiko Tomabechi, Lead
- Chinami Yoshida, Alternate
