= Sakurako Terada =

Japanese curler

Sakurako Terada (寺田 桜子, Terada Sakurako) is a Japanese curler, born May 17, 1984, in Sorachi District, Hokkaidō.

== History ==
Terada is a member of Team Aomori which was selected to represent Japan at the 2006 Winter Olympics . At the Games she was the alternate under skip Ayumi Onodera.
