= 2026 Japan Curling Championships =

- Host city: Yokohama, Kanagawa
- Arena: Yokohama Buntai
- Dates: June 7–14
- Men's winner: (Nagano Prefecture) SC Karuizawa Club
- Curling club: Karuizawa CC, Karuizawa, Nagano
- Skip: Tsuyoshi Yamaguchi
- Fourth: Riku Yanagisawa
- Second: Takeru Yamamoto
- Lead: Satoshi Koizumi
- Alternate: Yasumasa Tanida
- Coach: Yuji Nishimuro
- Finalist: (Hokkaido) Loco Solare (Maeda)
- Women's winner: (Nagano Prefecture) SC Karuizawa Club
- Curling club: Karuizawa CC, Karuizawa, Nagano
- Skip: Miyu Ueno
- Third: Yui Ueno
- Second: Asuka Kanai
- Lead: Ai Kawata
- Alternate: Mayo Koyanagi
- Coach: Yuji Nishimuro
- Finalist: Hokkaido Bank (Nihira)

The 2026 Japan Curling Championships (日本カーリング選手権大会 横浜2026, branded as the 43rd Zen-Noh Japan Curling Championships) were held from June 7 to 14 at the Yokohama Buntai in Yokohama, Kanagawa, Japan. Usually held in February, the event was moved to June due to the 2026 Winter Olympics.

== Men ==
=== Qualification ===
The following teams qualified to participate in the 2026 Japan Curling Championship:

Qualification method	Berths	Qualifying team(s)
2025 Champion	1	(Nagano Prefecture) SC Karuizawa Club
2025 Runner-Up	1	(Hokkaido) Loco Solare
Committee Recommendation	3	(Hokkaido) Consadole (Hokkaido) KiT Curling Club (Aomori Prefecture) Team Sato
Hokkaido Region	1	(Hokkaido) Sapporo International University
Tōhoku Region	1	(Miyagi Prefecture) Team Noguchi
Kanto Region	1	(Tokyo) Team Kyoto
Chūbu Region	1	(Nagano Prefecture) SC Karuizawa Club Jr.
West Japan Region	1	(Kyoto Prefecture) Kyoto CA
TOTAL	10	

=== Teams ===
The teams are listed as follows:

Team	Skip	Third	Second	Lead	Alternate	Locale
Consadole	Tetsuro Shimizu (Fourth)	Shinya Abe (Skip)	Haruto Ouchi	Hayato Sato	Asei Nakahara	(Hokkaido) Kitami
KiT Curling Club	Kohsuke Hirata	Shingo Usui	Takeshi Aoyanagi	Ryota Meguro	Hirofumi Kobayashi	(Hokkaido) Kitami
Kyoto CA	Hiroki Yoshioka	Ryo Wakabayashi	Kosuke Yuuki	Shinji Okamoto	Yakumo Nakamura	(Kyoto Prefecture) Kyoto
Loco Solare	Takumi Maeda	Hiroki Maeda	Uryu Kamikawa	Gakuto Tokoro	Ryotaro Shukuya	(Hokkaido) Kitami
Sapporo International University	Shunta Kobayashi (Fourth)	Kouki Ogiwara (Skip)	Go Aoki	Taiki Kudo	Hinata Michitani	(Hokkaido) Sapporo
SC Karuizawa Club	Riku Yanagisawa (Fourth)	Tsuyoshi Yamaguchi (Skip)	Takeru Yamamoto	Satoshi Koizumi	Yasumasa Tanida	(Nagano Prefecture) Karuizawa
SC Karuizawa Club Jr.	Kaito Fujii	Miki Yamamoto	Kounosuke Takahashi	Shunsuke Kanagawa	Ruki Yokoyama	(Nagano Prefecture) Karuizawa
Team Kyoto	Haruki Watanabe (Fourth)	Osuke Miya	Ayumu Henmi	Rin Kyoto (Skip)	Satoru Tsukamoto	Tokyo
Team Noguchi	Kotaro Noguchi	Minori Suzuki	Yuto Kamada	Hiroshi Kato	Hiromasa Yonehara	(Miyagi Prefecture) Miyagi
Team Sato	Chikara Segawa (Fourth)	Kaishi Sato (Skip)	Haruta Imamoto	Kota Imamoto	Koei Sato	(Aomori Prefecture) Aomori

=== Round robin standings ===
Final Round Robin Standings

Key
Teams to Championship Round

Pool C
Team	Skip	W	L	PF	PA	EW	EL	BE	SE	DSC
(Nagano Prefecture) SC Karuizawa Club	Tsuyoshi Yamaguchi	4	0	39	30	21	17	1	4	42.2
(Hokkaido) Sapporo University	Kouki Ogiwara	3	1	31	30	17	20	0	1	35.3
(Hokkaido) KiT Curling Club	Kohsuke Hirata	2	2	36	19	19	13	1	9	33.3
(Aomori Prefecture) Team Sato	Kaishi Sato	1	3	27	39	16	18	1	7	43.1
(Kyoto Prefecture) Kyoto CA	Hiroki Yoshioka	0	4	22	37	15	20	2	6	68.2

Pool D
Team	Skip	W	L	PF	PA	EW	EL	BE	SE	DSC
(Hokkaido) Loco Solare	Takumi Maeda	3	1	30	23	19	13	1	6	34.5
(Hokkaido) Consadole	Shinya Abe	3	1	28	17	17	14	4	5	48.0
(Nagano Prefecture) SC Karuizawa Club Jr.	Kaito Fujii	3	1	32	21	18	16	1	4	50.4
(Miyagi Prefecture) Team Noguchi	Kotaro Noguchi	1	3	25	32	17	19	2	3	45.6
(Tokyo) Team Kyoto	Rin Kyoto	0	4	17	39	10	19	2	1	60.6

=== Round robin results ===
All draws are listed in Japan Standard Time (UTC+09:00).

==== Draw 2 ====
Monday, June 8, 9:00

Sheet A	1	2	3	4	5	6	7	8	9	10	Final
(Kyoto Prefecture) Kyoto CA (Yoshioka)	2	0	0	0	0	1	0	1	1	X	5
(Aomori Prefecture) Team Sato (Sato) 🔨	0	1	2	2	1	0	2	0	0	X	8

Sheet B	1	2	3	4	5	6	7	8	9	10	Final
(Nagano Prefecture) SC Karuizawa Club (Yamaguchi) 🔨	2	1	0	0	0	1	0	2	0	2	8
(Hokkaido) KiT Curling Club (Hirata)	0	0	1	2	0	0	1	0	3	0	7

Sheet C	1	2	3	4	5	6	7	8	9	10	Final
(Hokkaido) Loco Solare (Maeda) 🔨	1	0	0	0	0	3	0	1	1	1	7
(Miyagi Prefecture) Team Noguchi (Noguchi)	0	0	0	1	2	0	1	0	0	0	4

Sheet D	1	2	3	4	5	6	7	8	9	10	Final
(Hokkaido) Consadole (Abe)	0	1	1	0	0	0	2	0	1	0	5
(Nagano Prefecture) SC Karuizawa Club Jr. (Fujii) 🔨	1	0	0	0	1	0	0	1	0	1	4

==== Draw 4 ====
Monday, June 8, 18:00

Sheet A	1	2	3	4	5	6	7	8	9	10	Final
(Nagano Prefecture) SC Karuizawa Club Jr. (Fujii) 🔨	0	2	0	4	0	1	0	1	3	X	11
(Hokkaido) Loco Solare (Maeda)	1	0	2	0	1	0	1	0	0	X	5

Sheet B	1	2	3	4	5	6	7	8	9	10	Final
(Hokkaido) Sapporo International University (Ogiwara)	0	2	0	0	0	2	0	0	3	2	9
(Kyoto Prefecture) Kyoto CA (Yoshioka) 🔨	2	0	0	0	1	0	2	2	0	0	7

Sheet C	1	2	3	4	5	6	7	8	9	10	Final
(Tokyo) Team Kyoto (Kyoto)	0	0	0	0	0	1	0	X	X	X	1
(Hokkaido) Consadole (Abe) 🔨	0	0	2	2	4	0	2	X	X	X	10

Sheet D	1	2	3	4	5	6	7	8	9	10	Final
(Aomori Prefecture) Team Sato (Sato) 🔨	3	0	2	0	0	3	2	0	0	0	10
(Nagano Prefecture) SC Karuizawa Club (Yamaguchi)	0	1	0	3	2	0	0	4	0	3	13

==== Draw 6 ====
Tuesday, June 9, 13:30

Sheet A	1	2	3	4	5	6	7	8	9	10	Final
(Miyagi Prefecture) Team Noguchi (Noguchi) 🔨	0	1	0	2	0	0	1	0	1	X	5
(Hokkaido) Consadole (Abe)	1	0	2	0	1	1	0	2	0	X	7

Sheet B	1	2	3	4	5	6	7	8	9	10	Final
(Nagano Prefecture) SC Karuizawa Club Jr. (Fujii)	1	0	3	0	0	2	0	2	0	X	8
(Tokyo) Team Kyoto (Kyoto) 🔨	0	0	0	1	1	0	1	0	2	X	5

Sheet C	1	2	3	4	5	6	7	8	9	10	Final
(Aomori Prefecture) Team Sato (Sato)	0	1	1	2	2	0	1	0	1	0	8
(Hokkaido) Sapporo International University (Ogiwara) 🔨	2	0	0	0	0	2	0	2	0	3	9

Sheet D	1	2	3	4	5	6	7	8	9	10	Final
(Hokkaido) KiT Curling Club (Hirata) 🔨	0	0	2	2	2	2	2	1	X	X	11
(Kyoto Prefecture) Kyoto CA (Yoshioka)	2	1	0	0	0	0	0	0	X	X	3

==== Draw 8 ====
Wednesday, June 10, 9:00

Sheet A	1	2	3	4	5	6	7	8	9	10	Final
(Hokkaido) Sapporo International University (Ogiwara) 🔨	2	0	1	0	0	1	0	2	0	1	7
(Hokkaido) KiT Curling Club (Hirata)	0	1	0	0	1	0	2	0	2	0	6

Sheet B	1	2	3	4	5	6	7	8	9	10	11	Final
(Hokkaido) Consadole (Abe)	0	0	2	0	2	0	0	1	0	1	0	6
(Hokkaido) Loco Solare (Maeda) 🔨	0	1	0	1	0	2	0	0	2	0	1	7

Sheet C	1	2	3	4	5	6	7	8	9	10	Final
(Kyoto Prefecture) Kyoto CA (Yoshioka)	0	2	0	1	0	2	1	0	1	0	7
(Nagano Prefecture) SC Karuizawa Club (Yamaguchi) 🔨	2	0	1	0	3	0	0	2	0	1	9

Sheet D	1	2	3	4	5	6	7	8	9	10	11	Final
(Tokyo) Team Kyoto (Kyoto)	0	0	2	0	4	0	1	0	2	0	0	9
(Miyagi Prefecture) Team Noguchi (Noguchi) 🔨	1	0	0	2	0	2	0	3	0	1	1	10

==== Draw 10 ====
Wednesday, June 10, 18:00

Sheet A	1	2	3	4	5	6	7	8	9	10	Final
(Hokkaido) Loco Solare (Maeda) 🔨	1	0	2	1	4	3	X	X	X	X	11
(Tokyo) Team Kyoto (Kyoto)	0	2	0	0	0	0	X	X	X	X	2

Sheet B	1	2	3	4	5	6	7	8	9	10	Final
(Miyagi Prefecture) Team Noguchi (Noguchi)	0	1	0	0	1	0	2	2	0	X	6
(Nagano Prefecture) SC Karuizawa Club Jr. (Fujii) 🔨	1	0	1	1	0	1	0	0	5	X	9

Sheet C	1	2	3	4	5	6	7	8	9	10	Final
(Hokkaido) KiT Curling Club (Hirata) 🔨	2	5	0	3	1	1	X	X	X	X	12
(Aomori Prefecture) Team Sato (Sato)	0	0	1	0	0	0	X	X	X	X	1

Sheet D	1	2	3	4	5	6	7	8	9	10	Final
(Nagano Prefecture) SC Karuizawa Club (Yamaguchi) 🔨	2	1	0	2	0	1	0	2	0	1	9
(Hokkaido) Sapporo International University (Ogiwara)	0	0	1	0	2	0	1	0	2	0	6

=== Championship round standings ===
Final Championship Pool Standings

Key
Teams to Playoffs

Team	Skip	W	L	W–L	PF	PA	EW	EL	BE	SE	DSC
(Nagano Prefecture) SC Karuizawa Club Jr.	Kaito Fujii	3	2	1–1	34	27	20	20	3	5	36.82
(Hokkaido) Loco Solare	Takumi Maeda	3	2	1–1	38	41	23	23	3	6	38.53
(Hokkaido) Consadole	Shinya Abe	3	2	1–1	37	28	23	18	4	6	41.26
(Nagano Prefecture) SC Karuizawa Club	Tsuyoshi Yamaguchi	2	3	2–0	34	39	21	24	2	3	36.38
(Hokkaido) Sapporo International University	Kouki Ogiwara	2	3	1–1	29	39	19	23	2	2	37.69
(Hokkaido) KiT Curling Club	Kohsuke Hirata	2	3	0–2	38	36	23	21	2	7	31.15

=== Championship round results ===
All draws are listed in Japan Standard Time (UTC+09:00).

==== Draw 12 ====
Thursday, June 11, 13:30

Sheet A	1	2	3	4	5	6	7	8	9	10	Final
(Nagano Prefecture) SC Karuizawa Club (Yamaguchi)	0	1	0	0	0	2	0	0	0	1	4
(Nagano Prefecture) SC Karuizawa Club Jr. (Fujii) 🔨	1	0	0	1	0	0	1	1	2	0	6

Sheet B	1	2	3	4	5	6	7	8	9	10	Final
(Hokkaido) KiT Curling Club (Hirata) 🔨	2	0	3	0	0	1	1	0	2	2	11
(Hokkaido) Loco Solare (Maeda)	0	2	0	3	1	0	0	2	0	0	8

Sheet C	1	2	3	4	5	6	7	8	9	10	Final
(Hokkaido) Sapporo International University (Ogiwara)	0	0	0	2	0	0	2	0	0	2	6
(Hokkaido) Consadole (Abe) 🔨	0	1	0	0	0	2	0	2	0	0	5

==== Draw 14 ====
Friday, June 12, 9:00

Sheet A	1	2	3	4	5	6	7	8	9	10	Final
(Hokkaido) Loco Solare (Maeda)	0	0	2	0	1	1	1	0	0	3	8
(Hokkaido) Sapporo International University (Ogiwara) 🔨	2	2	0	1	0	0	0	1	0	0	6

Sheet B	1	2	3	4	5	6	7	8	9	10	Final
(Hokkaido) Consadole (Abe) 🔨	1	0	3	1	2	0	2	0	1	X	10
(Nagano Prefecture) SC Karuizawa Club (Yamaguchi)	0	3	0	0	0	1	0	2	0	X	6

Sheet C	1	2	3	4	5	6	7	8	9	10	Final
(Nagano Prefecture) SC Karuizawa Club Jr. (Fujii)	0	0	0	0	2	0	0	0	X	X	2
(Hokkaido) KiT Curling Club (Hirata) 🔨	0	1	3	1	0	1	2	1	X	X	9

==== Draw 16 ====
Friday, June 12, 18:00

Sheet A	1	2	3	4	5	6	7	8	9	10	Final
(Hokkaido) KiT Curling Club (Hirata) 🔨	0	1	0	1	0	3	0	0	0	X	5
(Hokkaido) Consadole (Abe)	3	0	1	0	2	0	2	2	1	X	11

Sheet B	1	2	3	4	5	6	7	8	9	10	Final
(Hokkaido) Sapporo International University (Ogiwara)	0	0	0	1	0	2	0	1	0	X	4
(Nagano Prefecture) SC Karuizawa Club Jr. (Fujii) 🔨	2	4	1	0	2	0	0	0	2	X	11

Sheet C	1	2	3	4	5	6	7	8	9	10	Final
(Nagano Prefecture) SC Karuizawa Club (Yamaguchi) 🔨	0	0	4	1	0	1	0	0	1	0	7
(Hokkaido) Loco Solare (Maeda)	1	1	0	0	2	0	0	4	0	2	10

=== Playoffs ===
Page playoff system
1	(Nagano Prefecture) SC Karuizawa Club Jr.	1
2	(Hokkaido) Loco Solare	4
3	(Hokkaido) Consadole	7
4	(Nagano Prefecture) SC Karuizawa Club	9

Semifinal
1	(Nagano Prefecture) SC Karuizawa Club Jr.	5
4	(Nagano Prefecture) SC Karuizawa Club	6

Final
2	(Hokkaido) Loco Solare	5
4	(Nagano Prefecture) SC Karuizawa Club	6

==== 1 vs. 2 ====
Saturday, June 13, 9:00

Sheet C	1	2	3	4	5	6	7	8	9	10	Final
(Nagano Prefecture) SC Karuizawa Club Jr. (Fujii)	0	0	0	0	0	1	0	0	0	X	1
(Hokkaido) Loco Solare (Maeda) 🔨	0	1	0	1	0	0	0	1	1	X	4

==== 3 vs. 4 ====
Saturday, June 13, 9:00

Sheet A	1	2	3	4	5	6	7	8	9	10	Final
(Hokkaido) Consadole (Abe) 🔨	2	0	0	0	0	2	0	3	0	X	7
(Nagano Prefecture) SC Karuizawa Club (Yamaguchi)	0	2	0	3	2	0	1	0	1	X	9

==== Semifinal ====
Saturday, June 13, 14:00

Sheet B	1	2	3	4	5	6	7	8	9	10	Final
(Nagano Prefecture) SC Karuizawa Club Jr. (Fujii) 🔨	0	1	0	2	0	0	1	0	0	1	5
(Nagano Prefecture) SC Karuizawa Club (Yamaguchi)	1	0	2	0	1	0	0	0	2	0	6

==== Final ====
Sunday, June 14, 9:30

Sheet C	1	2	3	4	5	6	7	8	9	10	Final
(Hokkaido) Loco Solare (Maeda) 🔨	0	2	0	1	0	0	1	0	1	0	5
(Nagano Prefecture) SC Karuizawa Club (Yamaguchi)	0	0	1	0	2	1	0	2	0	0	6

2026 Japan Curling Championships
(Japan)
Tsuyoshi Yamaguchi
12th Japanese Championship title

=== Final standings ===
Place	Team	Skip
1st place, gold medalist(s)	(Nagano Prefecture) SC Karuizawa Club	Tsuyoshi Yamaguchi
2nd place, silver medalist(s)	(Hokkaido) Loco Solare	Takumi Maeda
3rd place, bronze medalist(s)	(Nagano Prefecture) SC Karuizawa Club Jr.	Kaito Fujii
4	(Hokkaido) Consadole	Shinya Abe
5	(Hokkaido) Sapporo International University	Kouki Ogiwara
6	(Hokkaido) KiT Curling Club	Kohsuke Hirata
7	(Aomori Prefecture) Team Sato	Kaishi Sato
8	(Miyagi Prefecture) Team Noguchi	Kotaro Noguchi
9	(Tokyo) Team Kyoto	Rin Kyoto
10	(Kyoto Prefecture) Kyoto CA	Hiroki Yoshioka

== Women ==
=== Qualification ===
The following teams qualified to participate in the 2026 Japan Curling Championship:

Qualification method	Berths	Qualifying team(s)
2024 Champion	1	(Hokkaido) Fortius
2024 Runner-Up	1	Hokkaido Bank
Committee Recommendation	3	(Hokkaido) Loco Solare (Nagano Prefecture) Chubu Electric Power (Nagano Prefecture) SC Karuizawa Club
Hokkaido Region	1	(Hokkaido) Sapporo International University
Tōhoku Region	1	(Aomori Prefecture) Philoseek Aomori
Kanto Region	1	(Tokyo) Grandir
Chūbu Region	1	(Nagano Prefecture) Team Miyota
West Japan Region	1	(Kyoto Prefecture) Kyoto University
TOTAL	10	

=== Teams ===
The teams are listed as follows:

Team	Skip	Third	Second	Lead	Alternate	Locale
Chubu Electric Power	Ikue Kitazawa	Seina Nakajima	Minori Suzuki	Hasumi Ishigooka	Chiaki Matsumura	(Nagano Prefecture) Nagano
Fortius	Sayaka Yoshimura	Kaho Onodera	Yuna Kotani	Anna Ohmiya	Mina Kobayashi	(Hokkaido) Sapporo
Grandir	Mizuki Hara	Aoi Watanabe	Eri Ogihara	Hinako Sonobe	Mao Ishigaki	Tokyo
Hokkaido Bank	Miku Nihira	Momoha Tabata	Sae Yamamoto	Mikoto Nakajima		(Hokkaido) Sapporo
Kyoto University	Ayaka Shinba	Yuka Yao	Minamikata Marin	Yui Tamura	Ayana Oikawa	(Kyoto Prefecture) Kyoto
Loco Solare	Satsuki Fujisawa	Tori Koana	Yumi Suzuki	Yurika Yoshida	Yako Matsuzawa	(Hokkaido) Kitami
Philoseek Aomori	Miori Nakamura	Hiyori Ichinohe	Misaki Tanaka	Yuna Harada	Junko Nishimuro	(Aomori Prefecture) Aomori
Sapporo International University	Kotoka Segawa	Suzune Yasui	Yuna Sakuma	Aira Inada	Yuina Miura	(Hokkaido) Sapporo
SC Karuizawa Club	Miyu Ueno	Yui Ueno	Asuka Kanai	Ai Kawata	Mayo Koyanagi	(Nagano Prefecture) Karuizawa
Team Miyota	Kai Tsuchiya	Erika Ohtani	Natsumi Urataki	Yumiko Kashiwagi	Anzai Manami	(Nagano Prefecture) Nagano

=== Round robin standings ===
Final Round Robin Standings

Key
Teams to Championship Round

Pool A
Team	Skip	W	L	PF	PA	EW	EL	BE	SE	DSC
(Nagano Prefecture) SC Karuizawa Club	Miyu Ueno	4	0	37	12	20	8	3	11	41.5
(Nagano Prefecture) Chubu Electric Power	Ikue Kitazawa	3	1	30	21	16	14	3	2	34.6
(Tokyo) Grandir	Mizuki Hara	1	3	14	31	11	17	3	4	42.5
(Aomori Prefecture) Philoseek Aomori	Miori Nakamura	1	3	29	35	14	20	3	2	66.3
(Hokkaido) Loco Solare	Satsuki Fujisawa	1	3	18	29	12	14	1	5	73.0

Pool B
Team	Skip	W	L	PF	PA	EW	EL	BE	SE	DSC
Hokkaido Bank	Miku Nihira	4	0	43	16	22	11	0	11	80.1
(Hokkaido) Fortius	Sayaka Yoshimura	3	1	40	29	19	12	1	7	34.6
(Hokkaido) Sapporo University	Kotoka Segawa	2	2	28	29	16	16	1	3	86.8
(Nagano Prefecture) Team Miyota	Kai Tsuchiya	1	3	31	28	16	17	0	6	61.7
(Kyoto Prefecture) Kyoto University	Ayaka Shinba	0	4	8	48	6	23	1	0	84.8

=== Round robin results ===
All draws are listed in Japan Standard Time (UTC+09:00).

==== Draw 1 ====
Sunday, June 7, 17:00

Sheet A	1	2	3	4	5	6	7	8	9	10	Final
(Tokyo) Grandir (Hara) 🔨	0	0	0	2	0	0	0	X	X	X	2
(Hokkaido) Loco Solare (Fujisawa)	0	1	1	0	4	2	1	X	X	X	9

Sheet B	1	2	3	4	5	6	7	8	9	10	Final
(Nagano Prefecture) SC Karuizawa Club (Ueno) 🔨	0	1	0	0	3	2	0	1	1	X	8
(Nagano Prefecture) Chubu Electric Power (Kitazawa)	1	0	0	1	0	0	1	0	0	X	3

Sheet C	1	2	3	4	5	6	7	8	9	10	Final
(Kyoto Prefecture) Kyoto University (Shinba) 🔨	0	0	0	0	0	0	X	X	X	X	0
(Nagano Prefecture) Team Miyota (Tsuchiya)	1	1	4	2	2	3	X	X	X	X	13

Sheet D	1	2	3	4	5	6	7	8	9	10	Final
(Hokkaido) Sapporo International University (Segawa)	0	1	0	2	0	1	0	X	X	X	4
(Hokkaido) Fortius (Yoshimura) 🔨	2	0	4	0	4	0	2	X	X	X	12

==== Draw 3 ====
Monday, June 8, 13:30

Sheet A	1	2	3	4	5	6	7	8	9	10	Final
(Hokkaido) Fortius (Yoshimura) 🔨	2	1	4	1	1	0	3	X	X	X	12
(Kyoto Prefecture) Kyoto University (Shinba)	0	0	0	0	0	1	0	X	X	X	1

Sheet B	1	2	3	4	5	6	7	8	9	10	Final
(Aomori Prefecture) Philoseek Aomori (Nakamura) 🔨	0	2	0	0	0	0	4	0	0	0	6
(Tokyo) Grandir (Hara)	0	0	1	1	2	1	0	1	0	1	7

Sheet C	1	2	3	4	5	6	7	8	9	10	Final
Hokkaido Bank (Nihira)	1	0	0	1	2	0	2	0	1	X	7
(Hokkaido) Sapporo International University (Segawa) 🔨	0	1	1	0	0	1	0	2	0	X	5

Sheet D	1	2	3	4	5	6	7	8	9	10	Final
(Hokkaido) Loco Solare (Fujisawa)	0	0	0	0	0	0	0	X	X	X	0
(Nagano Prefecture) SC Karuizawa Club (Ueno) 🔨	0	0	0	3	2	2	1	X	X	X	8

==== Draw 5 ====
Tuesday, June 9, 9:00

Sheet A	1	2	3	4	5	6	7	8	9	10	Final
(Nagano Prefecture) Team Miyota (Tsuchiya)	0	0	0	1	0	2	0	0	2	X	5
(Hokkaido) Sapporo International University (Segawa) 🔨	0	1	1	0	1	0	3	2	0	X	8

Sheet B	1	2	3	4	5	6	7	8	9	10	Final
(Hokkaido) Fortius (Yoshimura)	0	0	0	3	0	1	1	0	X	X	5
Hokkaido Bank (Nihira) 🔨	1	0	3	0	4	0	0	7	X	X	15

Sheet C	1	2	3	4	5	6	7	8	9	10	Final
(Hokkaido) Loco Solare (Fujisawa) 🔨	0	2	0	0	1	1	0	1	0	X	5
(Aomori Prefecture) Philoseek Aomori (Nakamura)	1	0	1	1	0	0	3	0	4	X	10

Sheet D	1	2	3	4	5	6	7	8	9	10	Final
(Nagano Prefecture) Chubu Electric Power (Kitazawa) 🔨	2	0	0	0	2	0	1	0	0	1	6
(Tokyo) Grandir (Hara)	0	0	0	1	0	1	0	2	0	0	4

==== Draw 7 ====
Tuesday, June 9, 18:00

Sheet A	1	2	3	4	5	6	7	8	9	10	Final
(Aomori Prefecture) Philoseek Aomori (Nakamura)	0	0	2	0	2	0	1	0	X	X	5
(Nagano Prefecture) Chubu Electric Power (Kitazawa) 🔨	2	1	0	3	0	3	0	3	X	X	12

Sheet B	1	2	3	4	5	6	7	8	9	10	Final
(Hokkaido) Sapporo International University (Segawa)	0	7	0	1	0	1	0	2	X	X	11
(Kyoto Prefecture) Kyoto University (Shinba) 🔨	1	0	1	0	1	0	2	0	X	X	5

Sheet C	1	2	3	4	5	6	7	8	9	10	Final
(Tokyo) Grandir (Hara) 🔨	0	0	1	0	0	0	0	X	X	X	1
(Nagano Prefecture) SC Karuizawa Club (Ueno)	1	3	0	1	1	2	2	X	X	X	10

Sheet D	1	2	3	4	5	6	7	8	9	10	Final
Hokkaido Bank (Nihira) 🔨	1	0	1	2	0	1	0	2	2	X	9
(Nagano Prefecture) Team Miyota (Tsuchiya)	0	2	0	0	1	0	1	0	0	X	4

==== Draw 9 ====
Wednesday, June 10, 13:30

Sheet A	1	2	3	4	5	6	7	8	9	10	Final
(Nagano Prefecture) SC Karuizawa Club (Ueno)	0	3	0	2	0	0	1	0	3	2	11
(Aomori Prefecture) Philoseek Aomori (Nakamura) 🔨	2	0	3	0	0	2	0	1	0	0	8

Sheet B	1	2	3	4	5	6	7	8	9	10	Final
(Nagano Prefecture) Team Miyota (Tsuchiya) 🔨	3	0	0	3	0	2	0	0	1	0	9
(Hokkaido) Fortius (Yoshimura)	0	2	1	0	1	0	2	3	0	2	11

Sheet C	1	2	3	4	5	6	7	8	9	10	Final
(Nagano Prefecture) Chubu Electric Power (Kitazawa) 🔨	1	0	0	0	3	0	3	0	2	X	9
(Hokkaido) Loco Solare (Fujisawa)	0	0	1	0	0	1	0	2	0	X	4

Sheet D	1	2	3	4	5	6	7	8	9	10	Final
(Kyoto Prefecture) Kyoto University (Shinba) 🔨	0	0	2	0	0	0	0	0	0	X	2
Hokkaido Bank (Nihira)	0	1	0	1	1	1	1	1	6	X	12

=== Championship round standings ===
Final Championship Pool Standings

Key
Teams to Playoffs

Team	Skip	W	L	W–L	PF	PA	EW	EL	BE	SE	DSC
Hokkaido Bank	Miku Nihira	5	0	–	45	27	23	20	0	6	50.5
(Nagano Prefecture) SC Karuizawa Club	Miyu Ueno	4	1	–	37	22	26	16	3	13	38.9
(Hokkaido) Fortius	Sayaka Yoshimura	2	3	1–1	35	40	18	22	3	5	30.2
(Nagano Prefecture) Chubu Electric Power	Ikue Kitazawa	2	3	1–1	28	29	20	20	3	5	41.0
(Hokkaido) Sapporo International University	Kotoka Segawa	2	3	1–1	30	37	20	21	4	6	73.5
(Tokyo) Grandir	Mizuki Hara	0	5	–	23	43	16	24	3	3	37.7

=== Championship round results ===
All draws are listed in Japan Standard Time (UTC+09:00).

==== Draw 11 ====
Thursday, June 11, 9:00

Sheet B	1	2	3	4	5	6	7	8	9	10	Final
(Nagano Prefecture) Chubu Electric Power (Kitazawa) 🔨	2	0	0	1	1	0	2	2	X	X	8
(Hokkaido) Fortius (Yoshimura)	0	0	1	0	0	1	0	0	X	X	2

Sheet C	1	2	3	4	5	6	7	8	9	10	Final
(Tokyo) Grandir (Hara)	0	1	0	1	1	0	2	0	2	0	7
Hokkaido Bank (Nihira) 🔨	3	0	2	0	0	2	0	1	0	1	9

Sheet D	1	2	3	4	5	6	7	8	9	10	11	Final
(Nagano Prefecture) SC Karuizawa Club (Ueno) 🔨	0	1	0	0	1	0	2	2	0	0	1	7
(Hokkaido) Sapporo International University (Segawa)	0	0	0	2	0	1	0	0	2	1	0	6

==== Draw 13 ====
Thursday, June 11, 18:00

Sheet B	1	2	3	4	5	6	7	8	9	10	Final
(Hokkaido) Sapporo International University (Segawa) 🔨	0	0	0	2	0	5	1	0	0	1	9
(Tokyo) Grandir (Hara)	0	0	0	0	1	0	0	2	3	0	6

Sheet C	1	2	3	4	5	6	7	8	9	10	11	Final
(Hokkaido) Fortius (Yoshimura) 🔨	0	2	0	0	2	2	1	0	0	0	0	7
(Nagano Prefecture) SC Karuizawa Club (Ueno)	0	0	3	1	0	0	0	1	1	1	1	8

Sheet D	1	2	3	4	5	6	7	8	9	10	Final
Hokkaido Bank (Nihira) 🔨	0	2	0	4	0	1	1	0	1	X	9
(Nagano Prefecture) Chubu Electric Power (Kitazawa)	1	0	1	0	2	0	0	2	0	X	6

==== Draw 15 ====
Friday, June 12, 13:30

Sheet B	1	2	3	4	5	6	7	8	9	10	Final
(Nagano Prefecture) SC Karuizawa Club (Ueno) 🔨	0	1	0	1	0	0	0	0	1	1	4
Hokkaido Bank (Nihira)	1	0	1	0	1	0	0	2	0	0	5

Sheet C	1	2	3	4	5	6	7	8	9	10	Final
(Nagano Prefecture) Chubu Electric Power (Kitazawa) 🔨	0	1	1	0	0	2	0	0	0	1	5
(Hokkaido) Sapporo International University (Segawa)	0	0	0	1	1	0	1	1	2	0	6

Sheet D	1	2	3	4	5	6	7	8	9	10	Final
(Hokkaido) Fortius (Yoshimura)	0	0	1	2	0	1	0	3	0	2	9
(Tokyo) Grandir (Hara) 🔨	1	1	0	0	0	0	1	0	2	0	5

=== Playoffs ===
Page playoff system
1	Hokkaido Bank	5
2	(Nagano Prefecture) SC Karuizawa Club	8
3	(Hokkaido) Fortius	12
4	(Nagano Prefecture) Chubu Electric Power	3

Semifinal
1	Hokkaido Bank	10
3	(Hokkaido) Fortius	6

Final
2	(Nagano Prefecture) SC Karuizawa Club	7
1	Hokkaido Bank	6

==== 1 vs. 2 ====
Saturday, June 13, 9:00

Sheet B	1	2	3	4	5	6	7	8	9	10	Final
Hokkaido Bank (Nihira) 🔨	1	0	0	0	0	0	2	0	2	X	5
(Nagano Prefecture) SC Karuizawa Club (Ueno)	0	0	2	2	2	1	0	1	0	X	8

==== 3 vs. 4 ====
Saturday, June 13, 9:00

Sheet D	1	2	3	4	5	6	7	8	9	10	Final
(Hokkaido) Fortius (Yoshimura) 🔨	2	0	2	2	0	4	0	2	X	X	12
(Nagano Prefecture) Chubu Electric Power (Kitazawa)	0	1	0	0	1	0	1	0	X	X	3

==== Semifinal ====
Saturday, June 13, 14:00

Sheet C	1	2	3	4	5	6	7	8	9	10	Final
Hokkaido Bank (Nihira) 🔨	0	2	0	3	0	2	2	1	0	X	10
(Hokkaido) Fortius (Yoshimura)	0	0	2	0	2	0	0	0	2	X	6

==== Final ====
Sunday, June 14, 14:00

Sheet B	1	2	3	4	5	6	7	8	9	10	Final
(Nagano Prefecture) SC Karuizawa Club (Ueno)	0	0	1	0	0	2	0	1	0	3	7
Hokkaido Bank (Nihira) 🔨	2	0	0	1	1	0	1	0	1	0	6

2026 Japan Curling Championships
(Japan)
Miyu Ueno
2nd Japanese Championship title

=== Final standings ===
Place	Team	Skip
1st place, gold medalist(s)	(Nagano Prefecture) SC Karuizawa Club	Miyu Ueno
2nd place, silver medalist(s)	Hokkaido Bank	Miku Nihira
3rd place, bronze medalist(s)	(Hokkaido) Fortius	Sayaka Yoshimura
4	(Nagano Prefecture) Chubu Electric Power	Ikue Kitazawa
5	(Hokkaido) Sapporo International University	Kotoka Segawa
6	(Tokyo) Grandir	Mizuki Hara
7	(Nagano Prefecture) Team Miyota	Kai Tsuchiya
8	(Aomori Prefecture) Philoseek Aomori	Miori Nakamura
9	(Hokkaido) Loco Solare	Satsuki Fujisawa
10	(Kyoto Prefecture) Kyoto University	Ayaka Shinba
