= Argo Graphics Cup =

Curling Tour event

- Established: 2022
- Host city: Kitami, Japan
- Arena: Kitami Curling Hall
- Website: www.agcc-kitami.info
- Purse: ¥ 1,720,000
- 2025 champion: (Nagano Prefecture) Ikue Kitazawa

The Argo Graphics Cup, stylized as the ARGO GRAPHICS Cup is an annual curling tournament on the Hokkaido Curling Tour, and is formerly a World Curling team ranking event. It is held annually in late August or early September at the Kitami Curling Hall in Kitami, Japan.

The event began in 2022, and has alternated between men's and women's events.

The purse for the event is ¥ 1,700,000.

== Men's champions ==
Year	Winning team	Runner up team	Purse (¥)	Winner's share (¥)
2023	(Nagano Prefecture) Karuizawa TM Yusuke Morozumi, Yuta Matsumura, Ryotaro Shukuya, Kosuke Morozumi	(Hokkaido) KiT Curling Club Kohsuke Hirata, Shingo Usui, Ryota Meguro, Yoshiya Miura	¥ 1,700,000	¥ 1,000,000
2025	(Hokkaido) KiT Curling Club Takumi Maeda, Hiroki Maeda, Uryu Kamikawa, Gakuto Tokoro	(Nagano Prefecture) Karuizawa TM Riku Yanagisawa (Fourth), Tsuyoshi Yamaguchi (Skip), Takeru Yamamoto, Satoshi Koizumi	¥ 1,720,000	¥ 1,000,000

== Women's champions ==
Year	Winning team	Runner up team	Purse (¥)	Winner's share (¥)
2022	(Hokkaido) B seat University selection Miyu Ueno, Sae Yamamoto (skip), Suzune Yasui, Momoka Iwase	(Hokkaido) Fortius Sayaka Yoshimura, Kaho Onodera, Anna Ohmiya, Mina Kobayashi		
2024	Hokkaido Bank Momoha Tabata (Fourth), Miku Nihira (Skip), Sae Yamamoto, Mikoto Nakajima	(Hokkaido) Loco Solare Satsuki Fujisawa, Chinami Yoshida, Yumi Suzuki, Yurika Yoshida	¥ 1,700,000	¥ 1,000,000
2026	(Nagano Prefecture) Chubu Electric Power Ikue Kitazawa, Seina Nakajima, Minori Suzuki, Hasumi Ishigooka	(Hokkaido) Sapporo International University Yuina Miura, Kohane Tsuruga, Rin Suzuki, Aone Nakamura	¥ 1,720,000	¥ 1,000,000
