= 2022 Japan Curling Championships =

- Host city: Tokoro, Kitami, Hokkaido
- Arena: Tokoro Curling Club
- Dates: May 22–29
- Men's winner: SC Karuizawa Club
- Curling club: Karuizawa CC, Karuizawa, Nagano
- Skip: Riku Yanagisawa
- Third: Tsuyoshi Yamaguchi
- Second: Takeru Yamamoto
- Lead: Satoshi Koizumi
- Coach: Yuji Nishimuro
- Finalist: Sapporo International University (Sato)
- Women's winner: Loco Solare
- Curling club: Tokoro CC, Tokoro, Hokkaido
- Skip: Satsuki Fujisawa
- Third: Chinami Yoshida
- Second: Yumi Suzuki
- Lead: Yurika Yoshida
- Alternate: Kotomi Ishizaki
- Coach: Ryoji Onodera
- Finalist: Chubu Electric Power (Kitazawa)

The 2022 Japan Curling Championships (branded as the 39th Zen-Noh Japan Curling Championships) were held from May 22 to 29 at the Tokoro Curling Club in Tokoro, Kitami, Hokkaido, Japan. Both the men's and women's events were played in a round robin format which qualified four teams for a page playoff.

Because of the 2022 Winter Olympics, a World Championship Trial was held in December 2021 between three teams on the men's and women's sides to determine Japan's representatives for the 2022 World Men's Curling Championship and 2022 World Women's Curling Championship. Due to this, the Japan Curling Championships were pushed back later into the year. Instead of the winners qualifying for the upcoming World Championships like usual, the winners of the 2022 Japan Curling Championships qualified as the Japanese representatives for the new Pan Continental Curling Championships.

== Summary ==
On the men's side, SC Karuizawa Club won their first national championship since the team disbanded at the following the 2017–18 season. The new team, skipped by Riku Yanagisawa, went a perfect 8–0 through the round robin portion of the event before losing the 1 vs. 2 page playoff to Sapporo International University, skipped by Hayato Sato. SC Karuizawa Club then defeated Consadole (Yasumasa Tanida) in the semifinal before winning 11–7 in the gold medal game over the Sato rink. Before they disbanded, the original SC Karuizawa Club rink of Yusuke Morozumi, Tsuyoshi Yamaguchi, Tetsuro Shimizu and Kosuke Morozumi won five straight national championships from 2013 to 2018. Now, Yamaguchi is the only player that remains on the team. SC Karuizawa Club is rounded out by second Takeru Yamamoto and lead Satoshi Koizumi. With the win, the team will represent Japan at the Pan Continental Curling Championships in November 2022, their first-time representing Japan at an international event since the 2018 Winter Olympics.

In the women's event, Team Loco Solare, with Satsuki Fujisawa, Chinami Yoshida, Yumi Suzuki, Yurika Yoshida and Kotomi Ishizaki won their third national championship since joining together for the 2015–16 season. Team Fujisawa finished top of the table after the round robin with a 7–1 record and then defeated Hokkaido Bank (Momoha Tabata) 6–4 in the 1 vs. 2 game. In the final, they faced Chubu Electric Power and Team Ikue Kitazawa, who represented Japan at the 2022 World Women's Curling Championship. Loco Solare played a steady game all the way through, never allowing Chubu Electric to score more than a single point in any end. Ultimately, they came out with the 7–3 victory and the title as national champions. Fujisawa formerly played for the Chubu Electric rink until joining Loco Solare in 2015. The team won their first national championship in 2016 and later again in 2020. With the win, Team Fujisawa become the first women's team to win two national titles in the past five years, with Fujikyu, Chubu Electric Power and Hokkaido Bank Fortius winning in 2018, 2019 and 2021 respectively.

== Medalists ==
	Gold	Silver	Bronze
Men	SC Karuizawa Club; Riku Yanagisawa; Tsuyoshi Yamaguchi; Takeru Yamamoto; Satoshi Koizumi	Sapporo International University; Hayato Sato; Go Aoki; Kouki Ogiwara; Kazushi Nino; Kei Kamada	Consadole; Yasumasa Tanida; Tetsuro Shimizu; Kosuke Aita; Shinya Abe
Women	Loco Solare; Satsuki Fujisawa; Chinami Yoshida; Yumi Suzuki; Yurika Yoshida; Kotomi Ishizaki	Chubu Electric Power; Ikue Kitazawa; Seina Nakajima; Minori Suzuki; Hasumi Ishigooka; Chiaki Matsumura	Hokkaido Bank; Momoha Tabata; Miku Nihira; Mikoto Nakajima; Ayami Ito

== Men ==
=== Qualification ===
The following teams qualified to participate in the 2022 Japan Curling Championship:

Qualification method	Berths	Qualifying team(s)
2021 Champion	1	Consadole
2021 Runner-Up	1	Tokoro Junior
Hokkaido Region	1	Sapporo International University
Tōhoku Region	1	Team Ishimura
Kanto Region	1	Team Tokyo
Central Region	1	SC Karuizawa Club
West Japan Region	1	Okayama CA
Wild Card 1	1	Kitami Association
Wild Card 2	1	Nagano Prefecture CA

=== Teams ===
The teams are listed as follows:

Team	Skip	Third	Second	Lead	Alternate	Locale
Consadole	Yasumasa Tanida	Tetsuro Shimizu	Kosuke Aita	Shinya Abe		Kitami
Kitami Association	Kohsuke Hirata	Shingo Usui	Ryota Meguro	Yoshiya Miura	Shunta Kobayashi	Kitami
Nagano Prefecture CA	Yoshiro Shimizu (Fourth)	Rui Sato	Genya Nishizawa	Minato Hayamizu (Skip)	Kai Shu	Nagano
Okayama CA	Hiroki Yoshioka	Hiromitsu Fujinaka	Yusuke Nonomura	Makoto Takahashi	Atushi Kamigakiuchi	Okayama
Sapporo International University	Hayato Sato	Go Aoki	Kouki Ogiwara	Kazushi Nino	Kei Kamada	Sapporo
SC Karuizawa Club	Riku Yanagisawa	Tsuyoshi Yamaguchi	Takeru Yamamoto	Satoshi Koizumi		Karuizawa
Team Ishimura	Juon Ishimura	Yuto Nakagawa	Youn Ishimura	Kuya Kawamura	Genta Kaimori	Aomori
Team Tokyo	Junpei Kanda	Hiromu Otani	Kizuki Ryokawa	Shotara Hashimoto	Ken Kanai	Tokyo
Tokoro Junior	Takumi Maeda	Uryu Kamikawa	Hiroki Maeda	Asei Nakahara	Taa Nakahara	Kitami

=== Round robin standings ===
Final Round Robin Standings

Key
Teams to Playoffs

Team	Skip	W	L	W–L	PF	PA	EW	EL	BE	SE	DSC
SC Karuizawa Club	Riku Yanagisawa	8	0	–	62	29	35	20	6	13	49.49
Sapporo International University	Hayato Sato	7	1	–	62	27	34	23	7	13	48.08
Consadole	Yasumasa Tanida	6	2	–	65	37	35	26	7	8	24.35
Kitami Association	Kohsuke Hirata	4	4	1–0	53	48	33	30	3	9	31.33
Tokoro Junior	Takumi Maeda	4	4	0–1	52	41	33	27	6	13	40.19
Team Ishimura	Juon Ishimura	3	5	–	41	53	26	35	6	5	36.91
Team Tokyo	Junpei Kanda	2	6	–	43	55	26	35	4	3	45.10
Okayama CA	Hiroki Yoshioka	1	7	1–0	26	75	21	34	2	4	69.63
Nagano Prefecture CA	Minato Hayamizu	1	7	0–1	30	69	23	36	1	4	46.40

=== Round robin results ===
All draws are listed in Japan Standard Time (UTC+09:00).

==== Draw 2 ====
Sunday, May 22, 13:30

Sheet A	1	2	3	4	5	6	7	8	9	10	Final
SC Karuizawa Club (Yanagisawa) 🔨	0	0	1	0	0	2	0	3	0	0	6
Team Ishimura (Ishimura)	0	0	0	0	3	0	1	0	0	1	5

Sheet B	1	2	3	4	5	6	7	8	9	10	Final
Kitami Association (Hirata) 🔨	4	3	0	0	1	1	0	1	X	X	10
Okayama CA (Yoshioka)	0	0	1	1	0	0	1	0	X	X	3

Sheet D	1	2	3	4	5	6	7	8	9	10	Final
Team Tokyo (Kanda)	0	0	1	0	1	0	X	X	X	X	2
Consadole (Tanida) 🔨	1	3	0	1	0	4	X	X	X	X	9

Sheet E	1	2	3	4	5	6	7	8	9	10	Final
Sapporo International University (Sato) 🔨	0	1	3	0	4	0	4	X	X	X	12
Nagano Prefecture CA (Hayamizu)	0	0	0	1	0	1	0	X	X	X	2

==== Draw 4 ====
Monday, May 23, 9:00

Sheet A	1	2	3	4	5	6	7	8	9	10	Final
Team Tokyo (Kanda) 🔨	0	2	3	5	0	1	X	X	X	X	11
Okayama CA (Yoshioka)	1	0	0	0	2	0	X	X	X	X	3

Sheet B	1	2	3	4	5	6	7	8	9	10	Final
Team Ishimura (Ishimura) 🔨	0	4	3	0	1	1	X	X	X	X	9
Nagano Prefecture CA (Hayamizu)	1	0	0	1	0	0	X	X	X	X	2

Sheet D	1	2	3	4	5	6	7	8	9	10	Final
Tokoro Junior (Maeda)	0	1	0	0	1	0	0	0	0	0	2
Sapporo International University (Sato) 🔨	0	0	0	1	0	2	1	1	0	2	7

Sheet E	1	2	3	4	5	6	7	8	9	10	Final
SC Karuizawa Club (Yanagisawa)	0	1	0	0	0	1	0	4	0	1	7
Consadole (Tanida) 🔨	2	0	0	0	1	0	2	0	1	0	6

==== Draw 6 ====
Monday, May 23, 18:00

Sheet A	1	2	3	4	5	6	7	8	9	10	11	Final
Okayama CA (Yoshioka) 🔨	0	1	0	3	0	0	0	1	0	1	2	8
Nagano Prefecture CA (Hayamizu)	1	0	1	0	0	3	0	0	1	0	0	6

Sheet B	1	2	3	4	5	6	7	8	9	10	Final
Tokoro Junior (Maeda)	0	2	0	1	0	0	0	0	1	X	4
Consadole (Tanida) 🔨	2	0	2	0	0	0	0	2	0	X	6

Sheet D	1	2	3	4	5	6	7	8	9	10	Final
Kitami Association (Hirata)	0	0	0	0	1	0	2	0	X	X	3
SC Karuizawa Club (Yanagisawa) 🔨	0	2	1	1	0	1	0	5	X	X	10

Sheet E	1	2	3	4	5	6	7	8	9	10	Final
Team Ishimura (Ishimura) 🔨	0	1	0	0	1	0	0	1	0	X	3
Sapporo International University (Sato)	0	0	2	1	0	2	1	0	3	X	9

==== Draw 8 ====
Tuesday, May 24, 13:30

Sheet A	1	2	3	4	5	6	7	8	9	10	Final
Sapporo International University (Sato) 🔨	0	0	2	0	0	2	0	1	0	2	7
Kitami Association (Hirata)	0	1	0	1	0	0	1	0	0	0	3

Sheet B	1	2	3	4	5	6	7	8	9	10	Final
Nagano Prefecture CA (Hayamizu)	0	0	0	1	0	0	1	0	X	X	2
SC Karuizawa Club (Yanagisawa) 🔨	0	2	1	0	2	1	0	3	X	X	9

Sheet D	1	2	3	4	5	6	7	8	9	10	Final
Okayama CA (Yoshioka)	0	1	0	0	0	1	1	0	1	0	4
Team Ishimura (Ishimura) 🔨	2	0	1	1	0	0	0	2	0	0	6

Sheet E	1	2	3	4	5	6	7	8	9	10	Final
Tokoro Junior (Maeda) 🔨	2	0	2	2	0	2	0	2	X	X	10
Team Tokyo (Kanda)	0	1	0	0	1	0	1	0	X	X	3

==== Draw 10 ====
Wednesday, May 25, 9:00

Sheet A	1	2	3	4	5	6	7	8	9	10	Final
Team Ishimura (Ishimura) 🔨	2	0	0	0	0	1	0	3	0	2	8
Tokoro Junior (Maeda)	0	2	1	1	1	0	3	0	1	0	9

Sheet B	1	2	3	4	5	6	7	8	9	10	Final
Team Tokyo (Kanda) 🔨	1	0	1	0	0	1	0	3	0	2	8
Kitami Association (Hirata)	0	2	0	0	1	0	2	0	2	0	7

Sheet D	1	2	3	4	5	6	7	8	9	10	Final
Consadole (Tanida) 🔨	2	0	1	0	0	3	0	2	1	0	9
Nagano Prefecture CA (Hayamizu)	0	1	0	1	0	0	3	0	0	1	6

Sheet E	1	2	3	4	5	6	7	8	9	10	Final
Okayama CA (Yoshioka) 🔨	0	1	0	1	0	0	X	X	X	X	2
SC Karuizawa Club (Yanagisawa)	1	0	1	0	5	3	X	X	X	X	10

==== Draw 12 ====
Wednesday, May 25, 18:00

Sheet A	1	2	3	4	5	6	7	8	9	10	Final
Consadole (Tanida) 🔨	1	0	1	1	0	2	0	0	0	0	5
Sapporo International University (Sato)	0	1	0	0	2	0	2	1	1	1	8

Sheet B	1	2	3	4	5	6	7	8	9	10	Final
Okayama CA (Yoshioka)	0	0	0	0	1	0	X	X	X	X	1
Tokoro Junior (Maeda) 🔨	2	4	3	1	0	0	X	X	X	X	10

Sheet D	1	2	3	4	5	6	7	8	9	10	Final
SC Karuizawa Club (Yanagisawa)	1	1	1	0	2	0	0	1	0	X	6
Team Tokyo (Kanda) 🔨	0	0	0	1	0	3	0	0	0	X	4

Sheet E	1	2	3	4	5	6	7	8	9	10	Final
Nagano Prefecture CA (Hayamizu)	0	0	0	1	0	0	X	X	X	X	1
Kitami Association (Hirata) 🔨	0	1	5	0	1	1	X	X	X	X	8

==== Draw 14 ====
Thursday, May 26, 13:30

Sheet A	1	2	3	4	5	6	7	8	9	10	11	Final
Nagano Prefecture CA (Hayamizu)	0	1	1	0	2	0	0	2	2	0	1	9
Team Tokyo (Kanda) 🔨	3	0	0	2	0	0	2	0	0	1	0	8

Sheet B	1	2	3	4	5	6	7	8	9	10	Final
Consadole (Tanida) 🔨	3	0	2	0	3	1	1	X	X	X	10
Team Ishimura (Ishimura)	0	0	0	1	0	0	0	X	X	X	1

Sheet D	1	2	3	4	5	6	7	8	9	10	Final
Sapporo International University (Sato) 🔨	2	0	4	0	2	4	X	X	X	X	12
Okayama CA (Yoshioka)	0	1	0	1	0	0	X	X	X	X	2

Sheet E	1	2	3	4	5	6	7	8	9	10	Final
Kitami Association (Hirata)	0	2	0	2	1	0	0	1	0	2	8
Tokoro Junior (Maeda) 🔨	1	0	1	0	0	2	1	0	2	0	7

==== Draw 16 ====
Friday, May 27, 9:00

Sheet A	1	2	3	4	5	6	7	8	9	10	Final
Kitami Association (Hirata)	0	1	0	2	0	2	0	1	0	X	6
Consadole (Tanida) 🔨	3	0	2	0	1	0	3	0	1	X	10

Sheet B	1	2	3	4	5	6	7	8	9	10	Final
SC Karuizawa Club (Yanagisawa) 🔨	1	0	1	1	0	2	0	0	3	X	8
Sapporo International University (Sato)	0	0	0	0	1	0	2	0	0	X	3

Sheet D	1	2	3	4	5	6	7	8	9	10	Final
Nagano Prefecture CA (Hayamizu) 🔨	0	1	0	0	0	0	0	1	0	X	2
Tokoro Junior (Maeda)	1	0	0	2	1	1	1	0	0	X	6

Sheet E	1	2	3	4	5	6	7	8	9	10	Final
Team Tokyo (Kanda)	0	2	0	0	1	1	0	0	1	X	5
Team Ishimura (Ishimura) 🔨	1	0	1	2	0	0	2	1	0	X	7

==== Draw 18 ====
Friday, May 27, 18:00

Sheet A	1	2	3	4	5	6	7	8	9	10	Final
Tokoro Junior (Maeda) 🔨	0	2	0	0	0	1	0	0	1	X	4
SC Karuizawa Club (Yanagisawa)	1	0	2	0	0	0	2	1	0	X	6

Sheet B	1	2	3	4	5	6	7	8	9	10	Final
Sapporo International University (Sato)	0	0	0	1	0	1	1	1	0	X	4
Team Tokyo (Kanda) 🔨	0	1	0	0	1	0	0	0	0	X	2

Sheet D	1	2	3	4	5	6	7	8	9	10	Final
Team Ishimura (Ishimura)	0	0	1	0	0	0	1	0	0	X	2
Kitami Association (Hirata) 🔨	1	0	0	2	1	1	0	1	2	X	8

Sheet E	1	2	3	4	5	6	7	8	9	10	Final
Consadole (Tanida) 🔨	5	0	0	1	2	1	0	1	X	X	10
Okayama CA (Yoshioka)	0	1	0	0	0	0	2	0	X	X	3

=== Playoffs ===
Page playoff system
1	SC Karuizawa Club	7
2	Sapporo International University	10
3	Consadole	5
4	Kitami Association	4

Semifinal
1	SC Karuizawa Club	10
3	Consadole	7

Final
2	Sapporo International University	7
1	SC Karuizawa Club	11

==== 1 vs. 2 ====
Saturday, May 28, 9:00

Sheet B	1	2	3	4	5	6	7	8	9	10	11	Final
SC Karuizawa Club (Yanagisawa) 🔨	0	2	0	0	2	0	2	0	0	1	0	7
Sapporo International University (Sato)	1	0	0	2	0	1	0	1	2	0	3	10

==== 3 vs. 4 ====
Saturday, May 28, 9:00

Sheet E	1	2	3	4	5	6	7	8	9	10	Final
Consadole (Tanida) 🔨	2	0	0	0	0	0	0	2	0	1	5
Kitami Association (Hirata)	0	2	0	0	0	0	0	0	2	0	4

==== Semifinal ====
Saturday, May 28, 15:00

Sheet D	1	2	3	4	5	6	7	8	9	10	Final
SC Karuizawa Club (Yanagisawa) 🔨	2	0	0	2	0	1	0	1	0	4	10
Consadole (Tanida)	0	1	1	0	2	0	2	0	1	0	7

==== Final ====
Sunday, May 29, 9:00

Sheet B	1	2	3	4	5	6	7	8	9	10	Final
Sapporo International University (Sato) 🔨	0	2	0	2	0	0	2	0	1	X	7
SC Karuizawa Club (Yanagisawa)	2	0	3	0	2	2	0	2	0	X	11

2022 Japan Curling Championships
(Japan)
Riku Yanagisawa
1st Japanese Championship title

=== Final standings ===
Place	Team	Skip
1st place, gold medalist(s)	SC Karuizawa Club	Riku Yanagisawa
2nd place, silver medalist(s)	Sapporo International University	Hayato Sato
3rd place, bronze medalist(s)	Consadole	Yasumasa Tanida
4	Kitami Association	Kohsuke Hirata
5	Tokoro Junior	Takumi Maeda
6	Team Ishimura	Juon Ishimura
7	Team Tokyo	Junpei Kanda
8	Okayama CA	Hiroki Yoshioka
9	Nagano Prefecture CA	Minato Hayamizu

== Women ==
=== Qualification ===
The following teams qualified to participate in the 2022 Japan Curling Championship:

Qualification method	Berths	Qualifying team(s)
2021 Champion	1	Fortius
2021 Runner-Up	1	Loco Solare
Hokkaido Region	1	Hokkaido Bank
Tōhoku Region	1	Philosique Aomori
Kanto Region	1	Fujikyu
Central Region	1	SC Karuizawa Club
West Japan Region	1	Team Hiroshima
2021 World Trials Champion	1	Chubu Electric Power
Wild Card	1	Sapporo Association

=== Teams ===
The teams are listed as follows:

Team	Skip	Third	Second	Lead	Alternate	Locale
Chubu Electric Power	Ikue Kitazawa	Seina Nakajima	Minori Suzuki	Hasumi Ishigooka	Chiaki Matsumura	Nagano
Fortius	Sayaka Yoshimura	Kaho Onodera	Anna Ohmiya	Yumie Funayama	Mina Kobayashi	Sapporo
Fujikyu	Yuna Kotani	Arisa Kotani	Mao Ishigaki	Michiko Tomabechi	Tori Koana	Yamanashi
Hokkaido Bank	Momoha Tabata	Miku Nihira	Mikoto Nakajima	Ayami Ito		Sapporo
Loco Solare	Satsuki Fujisawa	Chinami Yoshida	Yumi Suzuki	Yurika Yoshida	Kotomi Ishizaki	Kitami
Philosique Aomori	Misaki Tanaka (Fourth)	Miori Nakamura (Skip)	Haruka Kihara	Emiko Koyama	Hiyori Ichinohe	Aomori
Sapporo Association	Kana Ogawa	Momo Kaneta	Suzune Yasui	Noa Kyoto	Natsuko Ishiyama	Sapporo
SC Karuizawa Club	Asuka Kanai	Ami Enami	Junko Nishimuro	Mone Ryokawa		Nagano
Team Hiroshima	Yuki Shibuto	Riho Zaikan	Ikumi Masuki	Akari Iwatani	Sachie Ishihara	Hiroshima

=== Round robin standings ===
Final Round Robin Standings

Key
Teams to Playoffs

Team	Skip	W	L	W–L	PF	PA	EW	EL	BE	SE	DSC
Loco Solare	Satsuki Fujisawa	7	1	–	60	37	41	26	6	15	26.85
Hokkaido Bank	Momoha Tabata	6	2	1–0	63	36	33	24	4	11	48.20
Chubu Electric Power	Ikue Kitazawa	6	2	0–1	65	37	35	26	3	13	46.77
Fortius	Sayaka Yoshimura	4	4	1–1	65	44	37	32	2	14	31.14
Philosique Aomori	Miori Nakamura	4	4	1–1	48	54	30	38	3	6	36.73
SC Karuizawa Club	Asuka Kanai	4	4	1–1	43	46	31	34	3	10	42.89
Sapporo Association	Kana Ogawa	3	5	–	48	54	30	29	4	8	50.36
Fujikyu	Yuna Kotani	2	6	–	44	56	29	34	2	7	46.76
Team Hiroshima	Yuki Shibuto	0	8	–	18	90	16	39	1	3	115.04

=== Round robin results ===
All draws are listed in Japan Standard Time (UTC+09:00).

==== Draw 1 ====
Sunday, May 22, 9:00

Sheet A	1	2	3	4	5	6	7	8	9	10	Final
Fortius (Yoshimura)	0	0	3	1	0	2	1	0	1	X	8
Philosique Aomori (Nakamura) 🔨	0	1	0	0	1	0	0	1	0	X	3

Sheet B	1	2	3	4	5	6	7	8	9	10	Final
Fujikyu (Kotani) 🔨	2	1	0	3	0	2	2	X	X	X	10
Team Hiroshima (Shibuto)	0	0	1	0	1	0	0	X	X	X	2

Sheet D	1	2	3	4	5	6	7	8	9	10	Final
Loco Solare (Fujisawa) 🔨	0	1	0	2	0	0	1	1	1	1	7
Chubu Electric Power (Kitazawa)	0	0	2	0	2	0	0	0	0	0	4

Sheet E	1	2	3	4	5	6	7	8	9	10	Final
SC Karuizawa Club (Kanai)	0	1	0	1	0	0	0	1	0	X	3
Hokkaido Bank (Tabata) 🔨	2	0	1	0	0	1	2	0	1	X	7

==== Draw 3 ====
Sunday, May 22, 18:00

Sheet A	1	2	3	4	5	6	7	8	9	10	Final
Loco Solare (Fujisawa) 🔨	2	1	0	2	1	1	1	X	X	X	8
Team Hiroshima (Shibuto)	0	0	1	0	0	0	0	X	X	X	1

Sheet B	1	2	3	4	5	6	7	8	9	10	Final
Philosique Aomori (Nakamura)	0	1	0	0	0	0	2	0	0	X	3
Hokkaido Bank (Tabata) 🔨	1	0	1	1	1	2	0	1	2	X	9

Sheet D	1	2	3	4	5	6	7	8	9	10	Final
Sapporo Association (Ogawa)	0	0	0	0	1	0	0	2	0	X	3
SC Karuizawa Club (Kanai) 🔨	2	0	1	2	0	0	2	0	2	X	9

Sheet E	1	2	3	4	5	6	7	8	9	10	Final
Fortius (Yoshimura) 🔨	0	0	0	0	2	0	3	0	2	0	7
Chubu Electric Power (Kitazawa)	0	2	0	2	0	2	0	1	0	1	8

==== Draw 5 ====
Monday, May 23, 13:30

Sheet A	1	2	3	4	5	6	7	8	9	10	Final
Team Hiroshima (Shibuto) 🔨	0	1	0	0	0	0	X	X	X	X	1
Hokkaido Bank (Tabata)	0	0	4	1	2	4	X	X	X	X	11

Sheet B	1	2	3	4	5	6	7	8	9	10	Final
Sapporo Association (Ogawa)	0	0	1	0	0	1	0	1	X	X	3
Chubu Electric Power (Kitazawa) 🔨	0	1	0	4	3	0	1	0	X	X	9

Sheet D	1	2	3	4	5	6	7	8	9	10	Final
Fujikyu (Kotani) 🔨	0	2	0	1	0	2	1	0	4	X	10
Fortius (Yoshimura)	0	0	2	0	2	0	0	1	0	X	5

Sheet E	1	2	3	4	5	6	7	8	9	10	Final
Philosique Aomori (Nakamura) 🔨	2	0	0	1	1	1	0	3	1	X	9
SC Karuizawa Club (Kanai)	0	2	1	0	0	0	1	0	0	X	4

==== Draw 7 ====
Tuesday, May 24, 9:00

Sheet A	1	2	3	4	5	6	7	8	9	10	Final
SC Karuizawa Club (Kanai) 🔨	0	1	1	0	1	3	3	X	X	X	9
Fujikyu (Kotani)	0	0	0	1	0	0	0	X	X	X	1

Sheet B	1	2	3	4	5	6	7	8	9	10	Final
Hokkaido Bank (Tabata)	1	0	1	0	0	1	0	2	0	1	6
Fortius (Yoshimura) 🔨	0	1	0	1	1	0	3	0	2	0	8

Sheet D	1	2	3	4	5	6	7	8	9	10	Final
Team Hiroshima (Shibuto)	0	1	1	0	3	0	1	0	0	X	6
Philosique Aomori (Nakamura) 🔨	3	0	0	2	0	4	0	1	1	X	11

Sheet E	1	2	3	4	5	6	7	8	9	10	Final
Sapporo Association (Ogawa)	0	0	1	0	1	0	3	0	1	0	6
Loco Solare (Fujisawa) 🔨	1	2	0	2	0	0	0	1	0	2	8

==== Draw 9 ====
Tuesday, May 24, 18:00

Sheet A	1	2	3	4	5	6	7	8	9	10	Final
Philosique Aomori (Nakamura) 🔨	0	1	0	0	3	0	0	2	1	X	7
Sapporo Association (Ogawa)	0	0	2	1	0	0	1	0	0	X	4

Sheet B	1	2	3	4	5	6	7	8	9	10	Final
Loco Solare (Fujisawa)	1	0	1	1	0	1	0	3	0	1	8
Fujikyu (Kotani) 🔨	0	1	0	0	2	0	1	0	1	0	5

Sheet D	1	2	3	4	5	6	7	8	9	10	Final
Chubu Electric Power (Kitazawa)	0	0	0	1	1	0	1	0	2	X	5
Hokkaido Bank (Tabata) 🔨	0	4	0	0	0	2	0	2	0	X	8

Sheet E	1	2	3	4	5	6	7	8	9	10	Final
Team Hiroshima (Shibuto)	0	0	0	0	0	0	X	X	X	X	0
Fortius (Yoshimura) 🔨	4	1	2	3	2	4	X	X	X	X	16

==== Draw 11 ====
Wednesday, May 25, 13:30

Sheet A	1	2	3	4	5	6	7	8	9	10	Final
Chubu Electric Power (Kitazawa) 🔨	2	0	0	2	1	0	1	2	0	X	8
SC Karuizawa Club (Kanai)	0	1	1	0	0	1	0	0	1	X	4

Sheet B	1	2	3	4	5	6	7	8	9	10	Final
Team Hiroshima (Shibuto)	0	0	1	0	0	0	X	X	X	X	1
Sapporo Association (Ogawa) 🔨	2	2	0	4	3	4	X	X	X	X	15

Sheet D	1	2	3	4	5	6	7	8	9	10	Final
Fortius (Yoshimura)	2	0	1	1	1	0	1	0	1	3	10
Loco Solare (Fujisawa) 🔨	0	1	0	0	0	1	0	2	0	0	4

Sheet E	1	2	3	4	5	6	7	8	9	10	Final
Hokkaido Bank (Tabata) 🔨	0	0	1	0	2	4	2	0	X	X	9
Fujikyu (Kotani)	0	1	0	2	0	0	0	1	X	X	4

==== Draw 13 ====
Thursday, May 26, 9:00

Sheet A	1	2	3	4	5	6	7	8	9	10	Final
Hokkaido Bank (Tabata)	0	0	1	0	3	0	0	X	X	X	4
Loco Solare (Fujisawa) 🔨	1	1	0	3	0	0	5	X	X	X	10

Sheet B	1	2	3	4	5	6	7	8	9	10	Final
Chubu Electric Power (Kitazawa)	1	0	1	1	0	4	1	2	X	X	10
Philosique Aomori (Nakamura) 🔨	0	1	0	0	2	0	0	0	X	X	3

Sheet D	1	2	3	4	5	6	7	8	9	10	Final
SC Karuizawa Club (Kanai) 🔨	0	1	0	0	2	1	0	2	0	X	6
Team Hiroshima (Shibuto)	1	0	1	1	0	0	1	0	1	X	5

Sheet E	1	2	3	4	5	6	7	8	9	10	Final
Fujikyu (Kotani)	0	0	0	1	0	2	0	0	2	0	5
Sapporo Association (Ogawa) 🔨	2	0	1	0	3	0	0	1	0	1	8

==== Draw 15 ====
Thursday, May 26, 18:00

Sheet A	1	2	3	4	5	6	7	8	9	10	Final
Fujikyu (Kotani)	0	1	0	1	0	0	0	1	0	X	3
Chubu Electric Power (Kitazawa) 🔨	0	0	1	0	1	1	4	0	1	X	8

Sheet B	1	2	3	4	5	6	7	8	9	10	Final
Fortius (Yoshimura)	0	1	0	0	1	0	2	1	0	0	5
SC Karuizawa Club (Kanai) 🔨	0	0	1	1	0	1	0	0	1	2	6

Sheet D	1	2	3	4	5	6	7	8	9	10	Final
Hokkaido Bank (Tabata) 🔨	4	0	1	0	0	4	X	X	X	X	9
Sapporo Association (Ogawa)	0	1	0	1	0	0	X	X	X	X	2

Sheet E	1	2	3	4	5	6	7	8	9	10	Final
Loco Solare (Fujisawa) 🔨	2	1	0	1	0	2	0	0	0	1	7
Philosique Aomori (Nakamura)	0	0	1	0	1	0	2	1	0	0	5

==== Draw 17 ====
Friday, May 27, 13:30

Sheet A	1	2	3	4	5	6	7	8	9	10	11	Final
Sapporo Association (Ogawa)	0	0	2	0	1	1	0	1	1	0	1	7
Fortius (Yoshimura) 🔨	1	0	0	1	0	0	3	0	0	1	0	6

Sheet B	1	2	3	4	5	6	7	8	9	10	Final
SC Karuizawa Club (Kanai)	0	0	0	0	1	0	1	0	0	X	2
Loco Solare (Fujisawa) 🔨	0	2	1	2	0	1	0	1	1	X	8

Sheet D	1	2	3	4	5	6	7	8	9	10	Final
Philosique Aomori (Nakamura) 🔨	0	1	0	2	0	0	2	0	0	2	7
Fujikyu (Kotani)	0	0	1	0	1	1	0	2	1	0	6

Sheet E	1	2	3	4	5	6	7	8	9	10	Final
Chubu Electric Power (Kitazawa) 🔨	4	3	0	4	0	2	X	X	X	X	13
Team Hiroshima (Shibuto)	0	0	1	0	1	0	X	X	X	X	2

=== Playoffs ===
Page playoff system
1	Loco Solare	6
2	Hokkaido Bank	4
3	Chubu Electric Power	12
4	Fortius	2

Semifinal
2	Hokkaido Bank	5
3	Chubu Electric Power	7

Final
1	Loco Solare	7
3	Chubu Electric Power	3

==== 1 vs. 2 ====
Saturday, May 28, 9:00

Sheet D	1	2	3	4	5	6	7	8	9	10	Final
Loco Solare (Fujisawa) 🔨	0	1	0	1	0	0	2	1	1	0	6
Hokkaido Bank (Tabata)	0	0	1	0	0	2	0	0	0	1	4

==== 3 vs. 4 ====
Saturday, May 28, 9:00

Sheet A	1	2	3	4	5	6	7	8	9	10	Final
Chubu Electric Power (Kitazawa) 🔨	0	1	3	0	4	0	2	2	X	X	12
Fortius (Yoshimura)	0	0	0	1	0	1	0	0	X	X	2

==== Semifinal ====
Saturday, May 28, 15:00

Sheet B	1	2	3	4	5	6	7	8	9	10	Final
Hokkaido Bank (Tabata) 🔨	0	0	2	0	1	0	1	0	1	X	5
Chubu Electric Power (Kitazawa)	0	0	0	2	0	1	0	4	0	X	7

==== Final ====
Sunday, May 29, 16:30

Sheet D	1	2	3	4	5	6	7	8	9	10	Final
Loco Solare (Fujisawa) 🔨	1	0	0	2	0	2	0	1	1	X	7
Chubu Electric Power (Kitazawa)	0	1	0	0	1	0	1	0	0	X	3

2022 Japan Curling Championships
(Japan)
Satsuki Fujisawa
7th Japanese Championship title

=== Final standings ===
Place	Team	Skip
1st place, gold medalist(s)	Loco Solare	Satsuki Fujisawa
2nd place, silver medalist(s)	Chubu Electric Power	Ikue Kitazawa
3rd place, bronze medalist(s)	Hokkaido Bank	Momoha Tabata
4	Fortius	Sayaka Yoshimura
5	Philosique Aomori	Miori Nakamura
6	SC Karuizawa Club	Asuka Kanai
7	Sapporo Association	Kana Ogawa
8	Fujikyu	Yuna Kotani
9	Team Hiroshima	Yuki Shibuto
