= Yurika Yoshida =

Japanese curler

- Curler
- Born: July 7, 1993 (age 33); Kitami, Hokkaido, Japan

Team
- Curling club: Loco Solare CC, Kitami, Japan
- Skip: Satsuki Fujisawa
- Third: Yako Matsuzawa
- Second: Yumi Suzuki
- Lead: Yurika Yoshida

Curling career
- Member Association: Japan
- World Championship: 3 (2016, 2023, 2026)
- World Mixed Doubles Championship: 1 (2021)
- Pacific-Asia Championship: 4 (2015, 2016, 2017, 2018)
- Pan Continental Championship: 3 (2022, 2023, 2025)
- Olympic: 2 (2018, 2022)
- Grand Slam victories: 1 (2023 Canadian Open)
Medal record
Women's curling
Representing Japan
Olympic Games
Silver medal – second place	2022 Beijing	Team
Bronze medal – third place	2018 Pyeongchang	Team
World Championships
Silver medal – second place	2016 Swift Current
Pan Continental Curling Championships
Gold medal – first place	2022 Calgary
Silver medal – second place	2023 Kelowna
Pacific-Asia Championships
Gold medal – first place	2015 Almaty
Silver medal – second place	2017 Erina
Silver medal – second place	2018 Gangneung
Bronze medal – third place	2016 Uiseong
Representing Hokkaido
Japan Curling Championships
Gold medal – first place	2020 Karuizawa
Gold medal – first place	2022 Tokoro
Gold medal – first place	2023 Tokoro
Silver medal – second place	2012 Aomori
Silver medal – second place	2015 Tokoro
Silver medal – second place	2017 Karuizawa
Silver medal – second place	2019 Sapporo
Silver medal – second place	2021 Wakkanai
Bronze medal – third place	2007 Moseushi
Bronze medal – third place	2011 Nayoro
Bronze medal – third place	2014 Karuizawa
Bronze medal – third place	2025 Yokohama

Yurika Yoshida (吉田 夕梨花, Yoshida Yurika; born July 7, 1993) is a Japanese curler. She currently plays lead for Team Loco Solare, which is skipped by Satsuki Fujisawa. The team won the bronze medal at the 2018 Winter Olympics and the silver medal at the 2022 Winter Olympics.

== Career ==
Yoshida was a member of a team, "Tokoro Junior High school Robins", with Chinami Yoshida, Yumi Suzuki, and Kaho Onodera. They were the Hokkaido representative at the Japan Curling Championships, where they ranked third in both 2006 and 2007.

Yoshida and teammates Mari Motohashi and Yumi Suzuki added former skip Chinami Yoshida to their team at third for the 2014–15 season. With the team, she won her first World Curling Tour title at the 2014 Avonair Cash Spiel. Later that season, at the national championships, they lost the final against the Ogasawara rink to miss a berth to the world championships.

In May 2015, the Motohashi rink added Satsuki Fujisawa, a four-time Japanese champion skip. Motohashi moved from skip to alternate because of her pregnancy, and Fujisawa took over the rink of third Chinami Yoshida, second Yumi Suzuki, and led Yurika Yoshida. During the 2015-16 season, her team of Satsuki Fujisawa, Chinami Yoshida, Yumi Suzuki, and Mari Motohashi had success internationally as Japan's national team, winning gold at the 2015 Pacific-Asia Curling Championships and a silver at the 2016 World Women's Curling Championship, which was Japan's first-ever world championship medal. Meanwhile, domestically, Yoshida with the team won her first national championship title at the 2016 Japan Curling Championships. The team would win a bronze medal at the 2016 Pacific-Asia Curling Championships and a silver at the 2017 Pacific-Asia Curling Championships. They also won a bronze medal at the 2017 Asian Winter Games.

Yoshida was part of the Japanese team that won the 2018 Olympics women curling bronze medal.

Yoshida again represented Japan at the 2018 Pacific-Asia Curling Championships. Her team went an undefeated 6–0 record in the round robin but lost to the Koreans (skipped by Kim Min-ji) in the final. The next month, she represented Japan in the second leg of the 2018–19 Curling World Cup in Omaha, United States, which her team would end up winning, this time defeating Kim and her South Korean rink in the final.

Team Fujisawa began the 2019–20 season at the 2019 Hokkaido Bank Curling Classic, where they lost in the final to Jiang Yilun. Next, they won the ADVICS Cup. They had two more playoff appearances at their next two events, the Booster Juice Shoot-Out and the 2019 Colonial Square Ladies Classic, where they had semifinal and quarterfinal finishes, respectively. Next, they had a semifinal finish at the 2019 Curlers Corner Autumn Gold Curling Classic. In Grand Slam play, they made the quarterfinals at the Masters and the semifinals of the Tour Challenge, National and Canadian Open. They had two more playoff appearances on tour at the Red Deer Curling Classic, where they lost in the quarterfinals, and the Karuizawa International, where they lost the final to Anna Sidorova. For the first time in four seasons, Team Fujisawa won the Japan Curling Championships, defeating Seina Nakajima in the final. The team was set to represent Japan at the 2020 World Women's Curling Championship before the event got cancelled due to the COVID-19 pandemic. The Japanese Championship would be their last event of the season as both the Players' Championship and the Champions Cup Grand Slam events were also cancelled due to the pandemic.

Team Fujisawa played in no World Curling Tour events during the abbreviated 2020–21 season as there were no events held in Japan or Asia. The team would compete in the 2021 Japan Curling Championships, held from February 8 to 14, 2021 in Wakkanai, Hokkaido, as the defending champions. After an unblemished 6–0 round robin record, the team defeated Team Sayaka Yoshimura of Hokkaido Bank to advance to the final where they would once again face Yoshimura. Down one in the tenth, Team Yoshimura scored two points to win the national championship 7–6 over Team Fujisawa. This meant that once again, the team would not get to represent Japan at the World Championships. Team Fujisawa ended their season at the 2021 Champions Cup and 2021 Players' Championship Grand Slam events, which were played in a "curling bubble" in Calgary, Alberta, with no spectators, to avoid the spread of the coronavirus. The team had quarterfinal finishes at both events, losing out to Rachel Homan at the Champions Cup and Anna Hasselborg at the Players'.

In their first event of the 2021–22 season, Team Fujisawa finished runner-up at the 2021 Hokkaido Bank Curling Classic. They then played in the 2021 Japanese Olympic Curling Trials, which were held in a best-of-five contest between the Fujisawa and Sayaka Yoshimura rinks. After losing the first two games, Team Fujisawa rattled off three straight victories to win the trials and earn the right to represent Japan at the 2021 Olympic Qualification Event. There, the team finished third in the round robin and then defeated South Korea to secure their spot in the 2022 Winter Olympics. At the Games, Team Fujisawa led Japan to a 5–4 round robin record, enough to qualify as the fourth seeds in the playoff round. They then defeated the number one seeds in Switzerland's Silvana Tirinzoni to advance to the Olympic final, where they would face Great Britain's Eve Muirhead. The team could not keep their momentum going in the final, however, dropping the match 10–3, earning the silver medal. Elsewhere on tour for the season, Team Fujisawa lost in the final of the 2021 Curlers Corner Autumn Gold Curling Classic after a previously undefeated record. In November, they went undefeated to claim the Red Deer Curling Classic. In Grand Slam play, they only qualified in one of three events they played in, the 2022 Players' Championship, where they reached the quarterfinals. The team wrapped up their season at the 2022 Japan Curling Championships. There, they went 7–1 through the round robin and won the 1 vs. 2 page playoff game over Hokkaido Bank. They then defeated the Ikue Kitazawa's Chubu Electric Power team 7–3 in the final to claim the national title.

The Fujisawa rink won their second event of the 2022–23 season, going undefeated to win the Advics Cup. At the 2022 National, the team went undefeated until the semifinals where they were stopped by Kerri Einarson 8–5. They also lost to Team Einarson at the next Slam, 6–5 in a tiebreaker. Because they won the 2022 national championship, Team Fujisawa represented Japan at the 2022 Pan Continental Curling Championships where they finished third in the round robin with a 6–2 record. They then beat Canada's Einarson in the semifinal before defeating Korea's Ha Seung-youn 8–6 in the championship game. The team again missed the playoffs at the 2022 Masters after a 1–3 record. In the new year, the team was the first qualifier at the 2023 Canadian Open, winning all three of their pre-qualifying matches. They then won 8–7 over Anna Hasselborg in the quarterfinals and 7–6 over Gim Eun-ji in the semifinals to reach their first Slam final. There, they became the first Asian team to win a Slam, excluding defunct events, with a 5–3 win over Team Einarson. Team Fujisawa won their second straight national title at the 2023 Japan Curling Championships, defeating SC Karuizawa Club's Asuka Kanai 7–5 in the final. This qualified them for the 2023 World Women's Curling Championship where they qualified for the playoffs with a 7–5 record. They were then eliminated by Canada 6–4 in the qualification round. They finished their season with a quarterfinal appearance at the 2023 Players' Championship and a semifinal appearance at the 2023 Champions Cup, losing out to the Einarson rink at both events.

For a second year in a row, Team Fujisawa won the Advics Cup to begin their season, going undefeated to claim the title. Because they defended their title at the national championship, they again represented Japan at the 2023 Pan Continental Curling Championships, this year finishing second through the round robin with a 6–1 record. In the semifinal, they stole the win against the United States' Tabitha Peterson before coming up short against Korea's Gim Eun-ji in the final, settling for silver. In December, the team went undefeated at the 2023 Western Showdown until the semifinal where they lost 6–2 to Jolene Campbell. In the new year, they could not defend their national title, failing to reach the playoff round of the 2024 Japan Curling Championships. They bounced back with a strong run at the Sun City Cup before losing the final to Isabella Wranå. In Grand Slam play, the team only qualified in one of five events during the 2023–24 season, losing in the quarterfinals of the 2024 Canadian Open to Team Einarson.

To begin the 2024–25 season, Loco Solare lost back-to-back finals at the Argo Graphics Cup and the 2024 Saville Shootout to Momoha Tabata. They next played in the 2024 AMJ Campbell Shorty Jenkins Classic where they lost in the semifinals to Silvana Tirinzoni. At the first Slam of the season, the 2024 Tour Challenge, they qualified for the playoffs through the C side, eventually being eliminated by Kerri Einarson in the semifinals. They also qualified at the next two slams before being knocked out in the quarterfinals. They lost a third final to Team Tabata at the Red Deer Curling Classic before again reaching the semifinals of the 2024 Western Showdown. To begin the second part of the season, they qualified for their fourth straight slam playoffs at the 2025 Masters, losing out to Kim Eun-jung in the quarterfinals. At the 2025 Japan Curling Championships, the team again failed at reclaiming the national title, falling to Team Tabata for a sixth time during the season in the semifinals. They ended their season with another semifinal appearance at the Gangneung Invitational before failing to qualify at the 2025 Players' Championship.

In the final year of the Olympic quadrennial, Team Fujisawa had a strong start in advance of the 2025 Japanese Olympic curling trials, winning both the 2025 Wakkanai Midori Challenge Cup and Advics Cup as well as finishing third at the 2025 Hokkaido Bank Curling Classic. Despite this, the team struggled at the Olympic Trials for the first time, losing consecutive matches Miyu Ueno and Sayaka Yoshimura in the round robin before falling in a tiebreaker 7–2 to Yoshimura. It marked the first time since 2018 that Team Fujisawa did not represent Japan at the Olympics. Still chasing qualification for the world championship, the team reached the final of the 2025 Canadian Open Slam, the quarterfinals at the 2025 GSOC Tahoe and finished second at the Sun City Cup. They also represented Japan at the 2025 Pan Continental Curling Championships, finishing fifth. With their strong play and points accumulated throughout the season, the team earned the right to compete in the 2026 World Women's Curling Championship. There, they qualified for the playoffs with a 9–3 record, only suffering losses to Canada, Scotland and Türkiye. They then avenged their loss against Türkiye in the qualification round before suffering back-to-back losses in the semifinal and bronze medal game to Canada and Sweden, settling for fourth. Following the season, longtime third Chinami Yoshida announced she would be stepping back from the team with Yako Matsuzawa being named as her replacement.

== Personal life ==
Yoshida is an office worker at the Kitami Dermatology Clinic. She currently lives in Tokoro. She is the sister of curler Chinami Yoshida.

== Teams ==
Season	Skip	Third	Second	Lead	Alternate	Events
2011–12	Mari Motohashi	Megumi Mabuchi	Yumi Suzuki	Akane Eda	Yurika Yoshida	
2012–13	Mari Motohashi	Yurika Yoshida	Megumi Mabuchi	Yumi Suzuki		
2013–14	Mari Motohashi	Yurika Yoshida	Yumi Suzuki	Megumi Mabuchi		
2014–15	Mari Motohashi	Chinami Yoshida	Yumi Suzuki	Yurika Yoshida	Megumi Mabuchi	
2015–16	Satsuki Fujisawa	Chinami Yoshida	Yumi Suzuki	Yurika Yoshida	Mari Motohashi	PACC 2015, WWCC 2016
2016–17	Satsuki Fujisawa	Chinami Yoshida	Yumi Suzuki	Yurika Yoshida	Mari Motohashi	PACC 2016, AWG 2017
2017–18	Satsuki Fujisawa	Chinami Yoshida	Yumi Suzuki	Yurika Yoshida	Mari Motohashi	JOCT 2017, PACC 2017, 2018 OG
2018–19	Satsuki Fujisawa	Chinami Yoshida	Yumi Suzuki	Yurika Yoshida	Kotomi Ishizaki	CWC, PACC 2018
2019–20	Satsuki Fujisawa	Chinami Yoshida	Yumi Suzuki	Yurika Yoshida		
2020–21	Satsuki Fujisawa	Chinami Yoshida	Yumi Suzuki	Yurika Yoshida		
2021–22	Satsuki Fujisawa	Chinami Yoshida	Yumi Suzuki	Yurika Yoshida	Kotomi Ishizaki	OQE 2021, 2022 OG
2022–23	Satsuki Fujisawa	Chinami Yoshida	Yumi Suzuki	Yurika Yoshida	Kotomi Ishizaki	PCCC 2022, WWCC 2023
2023–24	Satsuki Fujisawa	Chinami Yoshida	Yumi Suzuki	Yurika Yoshida	Kotomi Ishizaki	PCCC 2023
2024–25	Satsuki Fujisawa	Chinami Yoshida	Yumi Suzuki	Yurika Yoshida		
2025–26	Satsuki Fujisawa	Chinami Yoshida	Yumi Suzuki	Yurika Yoshida		PCCC 2025, WWCC 2026
2026–27	Satsuki Fujisawa	Yako Matsuzawa	Yumi Suzuki	Yurika Yoshida		
