= Ayami Ito =

Japanese curler (born 2001)

- Curler
- Born: September 3, 2001 (age 25); Sapporo, Hokkaido

Team
- Curling club: Hokkaido Bank CS, Sapporo

Curling career
- Member Association: Japan
- World Championship: 1 (2021)
Medal record
Women's curling
Representing Hokkaido
Japan Curling Championships
Gold medal – first place	2021 Wakkanai
Silver medal – second place	2024 Sapporo
Silver medal – second place	2025 Yokohama
Bronze medal – third place	2022 Tokoro

Ayami Ito (伊藤 彩未, Ito Ayami; born September 3, 2001) is a Japanese curler from Sapporo. At the international level, she represented Japan at the 2021 World Women's Curling Championship.

== Career ==
Ito competed in her first Japan Curling Championships during the 2017–18 season as part of the Aomori Junior team. Her team, with Miori Nakamura, Kyoka Takahashi and Hiyori Ichinohe, fared quite well at the national championship despite being the youngest team in the field. The team went through the round robin with a 5–3 record, enough to qualify for the playoff round. They then lost to the eventual champions Fujikyu in the 3 vs. 4 game and were eliminated in fourth place. Ito and her teammates were unable to return to the national championship the next two years.

In 2021, she joined the Sayaka Yoshimura Hokkaido Bank Fortius team as their alternate for the 2021 Japan Curling Championships. Through the round robin, the team posted a 5–1 record, only suffering one loss to Satsuki Fujisawa and Team Loco Solare. They then lost to Fujisawa again in the 1 vs. 2 game, before winning the semifinal over Chubu Electric Power to qualify for the final. In the final, the team trailed by one point coming home. They were able, however, able to score two points in the tenth and final end to secure the 7–6 victory and the national championship. Their win qualified them for the 2021 World Women's Curling Championship, Ito's first international event. At the Worlds, the team finished in eleventh place with a 5–8 round robin record.

After their contract expired with Hokkaido Bank halfway through the 2021–22 season, Team Yoshimura formed their own team named Fortius. Ito was then recruited to the new Hokkaido Bank team, skipped by Momoha Tabata, for the 2022 Japan Curling Championships. At the championship, the team upset multiple top teams such as Chubu Electric Power and Fujikyu, ultimately finishing the round robin in second place with a 6–2 record. This qualified them for the 1 vs. 2 page playoff game against Loco Solare, which they lost 6–4. They then lost in the semifinal to Chubu Electric Power, earning the bronze medal from the championship.

== Personal life ==
Ito is employed as an office worker.

== Teams ==
Season	Skip	Third	Second	Lead	Alternate
2017–18	Miori Nakamura	Ayami Ito	Kyoka Takahashi	Hiyori Ichinohe	
2019–20	Miori Nakamura	Ayami Ito	Hiyori Ichinohe	Yuuna Harada	
2020–21	Sayaka Yoshimura	Kaho Onodera	Anna Ohmiya	Yumie Funayama	Ayami Ito
2021–22	Momoha Tabata	Miku Nihira	Mikoto Nakajima	Ayami Ito	
2022–23	Momoha Tabata	Miku Nihira	Mikoto Nakajima	Ayami Ito	
2023–24	Momoha Tabata	Miku Nihira	Sae Yamamoto	Mikoto Nakajima	Ayami Ito
2024–25	Momoha Tabata (Fourth)	Miku Nihira (Skip)	Sae Yamamoto	Mikoto Nakajima	Ayami Ito
