= Kaho Onodera =

Japanese curler (born 1991)

- Curler
- Born: 11 November 1991 (age 35); Tokoro, Hokkaido

Team
- Curling club: Sapporo CC, Sapporo
- Skip: Mina Kobayashi
- Third: Kaho Onodera
- Second: Yuna Kotani
- Lead: Anna Ohmiya

Curling career
- Member Association: Japan
- World Championship: 4 (2015, 2018, 2021, 2025)
- Pacific-Asia Championship: 3 (2013, 2014, 2021)
- Pan Continental Championship: 1 (2024)
- Olympic: 2 (2014, 2026)
Medal record
Women's curling
Representing Japan
Pacific-Asia Championships
Gold medal – first place	2021 Almaty
Bronze medal – third place	2013 Shanghai
Bronze medal – third place	2014 Karuizawa
Representing Hokkaido
Japan Curling Championships
Gold medal – first place	2015 Tokoro
Gold medal – first place	2021 Wakkanai
Gold medal – first place	2025 Yokohama
Silver medal – second place	2013 Sapporo
Silver medal – second place	2014 Karuizawa
Silver medal – second place	2018 Nayoro
Bronze medal – third place	2006 Aomori
Bronze medal – third place	2007 Moseushi
Bronze medal – third place	2016 Aomori
Bronze medal – third place	2019 Sapporo
Bronze medal – third place	2020 Karuizawa
Bronze medal – third place	2026 Yokohama

Kaho Onodera (小野寺 佳步, Onodera Kaho; born 11 November 1991 in Tokoro) is a Japanese curler from Sapporo, Hokkaido. She is the third on the FORTIUS curling team, which won the Japan Curling Championships in 2015, 2021 and 2025. At the international level, she has represented Japan at four World Women's Curling Championship (2015, 2018, 2021, 2025) and three Pacific-Asia Curling Championships in 2013, 2014 and 2021, winning the gold medal in 2021.

== Career ==
=== Juniors ===
While attending Tokoro Junior High School, Onodera competed on the girls team that consisted of Chinami Yoshida, Yurika Yoshida and Yumi Suzuki. The team won back to back bronze medals at the Japan Curling Championships in 2006 and 2007. In 2009, she joined the Tokoro High School team, skipped by Sayaka Yoshimura as alternate. The team competed in the Japanese qualification round for the 2010 Winter Olympics, but lost in the first round to Team Nagano.

=== Women's ===
==== 2012–2018: Team Ogasawara ====
Onodera joined the Hokkaido Bank Fortius curling team consisting of skip Ayumi Ogasawara, Yumie Funayama at third, Michiko Tomabechi at lead and Chinami Yoshida as alternate in 2012. The team played in six tour events during the 2012–13 season, qualifying in three of them, including a second-place finish at the Karuizawa International. The following season, the team played finished runner-up at the 2013 Kamloops Crown of Curling on tour.

In September 2013, they competed in the national trials for the 2013 Olympic Qualification Event for the chance to represent Japan at the 2014 Winter Olympics. They finished the first round with a 4–2 record, which put them into a best-of-five final against the three-time reigning national champions Chubu Electric Power, skipped by Satsuki Fujisawa. There, they upset Chubu Electric three games to one to qualify for the 2013 Olympic Qualification Event. At the qualification event, Hokkaido Bank went 5–1, qualifying for the playoffs. After losing to China's Wang Bingyu in the first qualifier, they won 10–4 over Norway's Marianne Rørvik in the second qualifier to secure the last spot at the 2014 Winter Olympics. At the Games, they finished in fifth with a 4–5 record, just missing the playoffs. They did however defeat former world champions Wang Bingyu of China and Mirjam Ott of Switzerland in two of their victories. Also during the 2013–14 season, they won a bronze medal at the 2013 Pacific-Asia Curling Championships in Shanghai, China. To end the season, Team Ogasawara finished second place at the 2014 Japan Curling Championships, losing in the final game to Chubu Electric Power.

The next season, Tomabechi and Yoshida left the team and were replaced by Sayaka Yoshimura at third and Anna Ohmiya at lead as Funayama moved to alternate. On the World Curling Tour, they would win two events, the Prestige Hotels & Resorts Curling Classic and the Hub International Crown of Curling. They represented Japan once again at the 2014 Pacific-Asia Curling Championships. After a 5–3 round robin record, they lost to China's Liu Sijia in the semifinal. They were, however, able to pick up the bronze medal against New Zealand's Chelsea Farley. This would ordinarily not be enough to qualify Japan for the World Championships, but because Sapporo was hosting the event, Japan qualified for the 2015 World Women's Curling Championship. The team then competed in their national championship to determine who would represent Japan at the World Championship. After the round robin, they placed second with a 7–1 record, but defeated Loco Solare (Mari Motohashi) to qualify for the final where they once again played Motohashi. The team were successful in securing the national title by defeating Loco Solare 8–5 and qualifying for the World Championship, Onodera's first Worlds. There, they placed just outside of the tiebreakers with a 6–5 record, ending in sixth place.

Team Ogasawara won one tour event during the 2015–16 season, the Karuizawa International, where they lost only one game en route to claiming the title. They also had semifinal appearances at the Colonial Square Ladies Classic, the Crestwood Ladies Fall Classic and the City of Perth Ladies International. The team played in the 2016 Continental Cup of Curling where they were part of the losing Team World squad. In February 2016, they competed in the Japan Curling Championships, attempting to defend their title. They had a strong round robin, going an undefeated 8–0, but then lost both of their playoff games to Loco Solare (Satsuki Fujisawa) and Fujikyu (Tori Koana), settling for third. They also played in the 2016 Humpty's Champions Cup, the team's first Grand Slam event. They would finish the round robin as the number one seed with a 4–0 record before losing in the quarterfinals to Switzerland's Silvana Tirinzoni.

The team altered their lineup for the 2016–17 season, moving Yoshimura to alternate and Yumie Funayama to third. At the start of the season, Team Ogasawara finished runner-up at the Royal LePage Women's Fall Classic to the Robyn MacPhee rink. They played in one grand slam, the 2016 Tour Challenge, losing in a tiebreaker to Anna Hasselborg. At the national championship, they went 6–2 through the round robin before losing both the semifinal and bronze medal games, settling for fourth. The next season was more successful for the team, reaching the semifinals in five of their eleven tour events. They were not able to make it further than the semifinals in any of their events, however. They did not have the opportunity to compete to represent Japan at the 2018 Winter Olympics as only the Fujisawa and Chiaki Matsumura rinks were selected to compete in the 2017 Japanese Olympic Curling Trials. At the 2018 Japan Curling Championships, they went 7–1 through the round robin and once again won the 1 vs. 2 page playoff game to qualify for the final. There, they faced Koana's Fujikyu rink. Tied 3–3 with the hammer in the tenth end, Ogasawara missed her last shot and the team gave up a steal of two and the win to the Koana rink. Despite the loss, Onodera was added to Fujikyu's lineup as alternate for the 2018 World Women's Curling Championship. There, the team finished in tenth place with a 5–7 record. Following the season, Ayumi Ogasawara stepped away from competitive curling.

==== 2012–2018: Team Yoshimura ====
For the 2018–19 season, Yoshimura stepped up to skip the team with Onodera at third, Ohmiya at second and Funayama as lead. The team would have immediate success on the tour, winning the 2018 Oakville Fall Classic. The team played in three Slams over the course of the season, the 2018 Tour Challenge Tier 2, the 2018 National and 2019 Players' Championship. Despite missing the playoffs at the National and Players' Championship, the team made it all the way to the final of the Tour Challenge Tier 2 where they were defeated by the Elena Stern rink. They also had three runner-up finishes at the Colonial Square Ladies Classic, the 2018 Paf Masters Tour and the Karuizawa International. At the 2019 Japan Curling Championships, Yoshimura led the team to a fourth place 5–3 record in the round robin. They were then able to defeat Fujikyu in the 3 vs. 4 game but were eliminated by Loco Solare in the semifinal, earning the bronze medal.

Team Yoshimura had a slow start to the 2019–20 season, only qualifying for the playoffs in three of their first eight events. They reached the semifinals of the 2019 Cargill Curling Training Centre Icebreaker and the quarterfinals of both the 2019 AMJ Campbell Shorty Jenkins Classic and the KW Fall Classic. They would find success at the first Grand Slam event of the season, however, reaching the playoffs of the 2019 Masters with a 3–1 record. They would then upset higher ranked teams Jennifer Jones and Silvana Tirinzoni before losing to Tracy Fleury in the final. It marked the first time an Asian team made it to a grand slam final, excluding defunct events. The team would not qualify in any of the three other Slams they participated in during the season, the 2019 Tour Challenge, the 2019 National or the 2020 Canadian Open. They once again finished third at the 2020 Japan Curling Championships after a semifinal loss to Chubu Electric Power (Seina Nakajima). The Japanese championship would be their last event of the season as both the Players' Championship and the Champions Cup Grand Slam events were also cancelled due to the pandemic.

Team Yoshimura played in no World Curling Tour events during the abbreviated 2020–21 season as there were no events held in Japan or Asia. The team would compete in the 2021 Japan Curling Championships, held from 8 to 14 February 2021 in Wakkanai, Hokkaido. The team posted a 5–1 record through the round robin of the national championship, earning them a spot in the 1 vs. 2 page playoff game. There, the lost to Loco Solare, but beat Chubu Electric Power in the semifinal to qualify for the final. Down one in the tenth, Team Yoshimura scored two points to win the national championship 7–6 over Team Fujisawa. The win marked the team's second time winning the national title in over six years. It also earned them the right to represent Japan at the 2021 World Women's Curling Championship, which was played in a bio-secure bubble in Calgary, Canada due the ongoing pandemic. At the Worlds, the team finished in eleventh place with a 5–8 record.

In September 2021, the team competed in the 2021 Japanese Olympic Curling Trials, which were held in a best-of-five contest between the Yoshimura and Satsuki Fujisawa rinks. After winning the first two games, Team Yoshimura lost the final three games of the trials, not earning the right to represent Japan at the 2021 Olympic Qualification Event. They played in one Slam at the 2021 Masters where they went a winless 0–3 in the triple knockout bracket. They were, however, still able to represent Japan at the 2021 Pacific-Asia Curling Championships due to winning the 2021 national championship. There, they went 5–1 through the round robin, earning a direct bye to the final where they faced South Korea's Kim Eun-jung. Down one in the tenth, Team Yoshimura was once again able to score a deuce to win the game 6–5 and earn the gold medal. Because Team Fujisawa won the Olympic Trials series and were representing Japan at the 2022 Winter Olympics, a world championship trial was held between Hokkaido Bank Fortius, Chubu Electric Power and Fujikyu to determine who would represent Japan at the 2022 World Women's Curling Championship. Hokkaido Bank posted a 3–1 record in the qualifying round, earning them a spot in the best-of-three final against Nakajima. After splitting the first two games, the Nakajima rink took one in the tenth end of the final game to earn the berth as Team Japan at the World Championship. In December, the team added Mina Kobayashi as their alternate. Team Yoshimura ended their season at the 2022 Japan Curling Championships. After a 4–4 round robin record, they lost in the 3 vs. 4 page playoff game to Chubu Electric Power. Also during the 2021–22 season, the team's contract expired with Hokkaido Bank. They then formed their own team named Fortius.

In their first event of the 2022–23 season, Team Yoshimura won the 2022 Hokkaido Bank Curling Classic. They then won the 2022 Wakkanai Midori Challenge Cup two weeks later. In their next two events, they again reached the finals, losing the Argo Graphics Cup final to Sae Yamamoto and the ADVICS Cup final to Team Fujisawa. After a successful start to the season, Yuna Kotani was added at the third position in September 2022. The revised lineup of the team was Yoshimura at skip, Kotani at third, Onodera at second, Ohmiya at lead and Kobayashi as alternate with Yumie Funayama becoming the team's coach. In Canada, the team had back-to-back quarterfinal appearances at the S3 Group Curling Stadium Series and the 2022 Western Showdown, losing out to Stefania Constantini and Meghan Walter respectively. In December, Team Yoshimura competed in the 2022 Karuizawa International Curling Championships where they finished third, beating Loco Solare in the bronze medal game. In the New Year, the team played in the 2023 New Year Medalist Curling where they lost in the semifinals to Daniela Jentsch. It would be the team's last event of the 2022–23 season as positive cases of COVID-19 within the team forced them to withdraw from their qualifying round of the 2023 Japan Curling Championships.

Team Yoshimura would return for the 2024–25 season, where they would find success on tour, finishing in the quarterfinals at the 2024 National and the 2025 Players' Championship Grand Slam events. During the season, Yoshimura would win their next national title at the 2025 Japan Curling Championships, beating Miku Nihira 8–7 in the final. This win qualified them to represent Japan at the 2025 World Women's Curling Championship. At the World's however, the team would struggle, finishing 9th with a 4–8 record after round robin play.

==== 2025–present: Onodera's return to the Olympics ====
Team Yoshimura would begin the 2025–26 season strong, winning the 2025 Hokkaido Bank Curling Classic, beating Momoha Tabata 6–3 in the final. They would continue their winning streak at the 2025 Japanese Olympic curling trials, beating Miyu Ueno 3–2 in a best-of-five final, and qualifying to represent Japan at the 2025 Olympic Qualification Event. At the Qualification event, the team would go 6–1 in the round robin and win 6–5 over Norway's Marianne Rørvik to win the event and qualify for the 2026 Winter Olympics.

== Personal life ==
Onodera works as an office worker. She attended Tokoro Junior High School, Tokoro High School and Chukyo University.

== Grand Slam record ==
Key
C	Champion
F	Lost in Final
SF	Lost in Semifinal
QF	Lost in Quarterfinals
R16	Lost in the round of 16
Q	Did not advance to playoffs
T2	Played in Tier 2 event
DNP	Did not participate in event
N/A	Not a Grand Slam event that season

Event	2015–16	2016–17	2017–18	2018–19	2019–20	2020–21	2021–22	2022–23	2023–24	2024–25	2025–26	2026–27
Invitational	DNP	DNP	DNP	T2	Q	N/A	N/A	DNP	T2	T2	Q	DNP
Masters	DNP	DNP	DNP	DNP	F	N/A	Q	DNP	DNP	DNP	Q	Q
National	DNP	DNP	DNP	Q	Q	N/A	DNP	DNP	DNP	DNP	QF	Q
Open	DNP	DNP	DNP	DNP	Q	N/A	N/A	DNP	DNP	Q	SF	DNP
Players'	DNP	DNP	DNP	Q	N/A	DNP	DNP	DNP	DNP	QF	Q	
Champions Cup	QF	DNP	DNP	DNP	N/A	DNP	DNP	DNP	N/A	N/A	N/A	N/A

=== Former events ===
Event	2014–15
Autumn Gold	Q

== Teams ==
Season	Skip	Third	Second	Lead	Alternate
2005–06	Chinami Yoshida	Tomona Nakagawa	Kaho Onodera	Yumi Suzuki	Mayu Ogasawara
2006–07	Chinami Yoshida	Kaho Onodera	Yurika Yoshida	Yumi Suzuki	
2009–10	Sayaka Yoshimura	Rina Ida	Risa Ujihara	Mao Ishigaki	Kaho Onodera
2012–13	Ayumi Ogasawara	Yumie Funayama	Kaho Onodera	Michiko Tomabechi	Chinami Yoshida
2013–14	Ayumi Ogasawara	Yumie Funayama	Kaho Onodera	Michiko Tomabechi	Chinami Yoshida
2014–15	Ayumi Ogasawara	Sayaka Yoshimura	Kaho Onodera	Anna Ohmiya	Yumie Funayama
2015–16	Ayumi Ogasawara	Sayaka Yoshimura	Kaho Onodera	Anna Ohmiya	Yumie Funayama
2016–17	Ayumi Ogasawara	Yumie Funayama	Kaho Onodera	Anna Ohmiya	Sayaka Yoshimura
2017–18	Ayumi Ogasawara	Kaho Onodera	Yumie Funayama	Anna Ohmiya	Sayaka Yoshimura
2018–19	Sayaka Yoshimura	Kaho Onodera	Anna Ohmiya	Yumie Funayama	
2019–20	Sayaka Yoshimura	Kaho Onodera	Anna Ohmiya	Yumie Funayama	
2020–21	Sayaka Yoshimura	Kaho Onodera	Anna Ohmiya	Yumie Funayama	Ayami Ito
2021–22	Sayaka Yoshimura	Kaho Onodera	Anna Ohmiya	Yumie Funayama	Momoha Tabata / Mina Kobayashi
2022–23	Sayaka Yoshimura	Kaho Onodera	Anna Ohmiya	Yumie Funayama	Mina Kobayashi
2022–23	Sayaka Yoshimura	Yuna Kotani	Kaho Onodera	Anna Ohmiya	Mina Kobayashi
2023–24	Yuna Kotani	Kaho Onodera	Anna Ohmiya	Mina Kobayashi	Sayaka Yoshimura
2024–25	Sayaka Yoshimura	Yuna Kotani	Kaho Onodera	Anna Ohmiya	Mina Kobayashi
2024–25	Sayaka Yoshimura	Kaho Onodera (Note: Onodera and Yuna Kotani switched positions halfway through the season.)	Yuna Kotani	Anna Ohmiya	Mina Kobayashi
2025–26	Sayaka Yoshimura	Kaho Onodera	Yuna Kotani	Anna Ohmiya	Mina Kobayashi
2026–27	Mina Kobayashi	Kaho Onodera	Yuna Kotani	Anna Ohmiya	
