= Hokuriku Bank =

Japanese bank

The Hokuriku Bank, Ltd
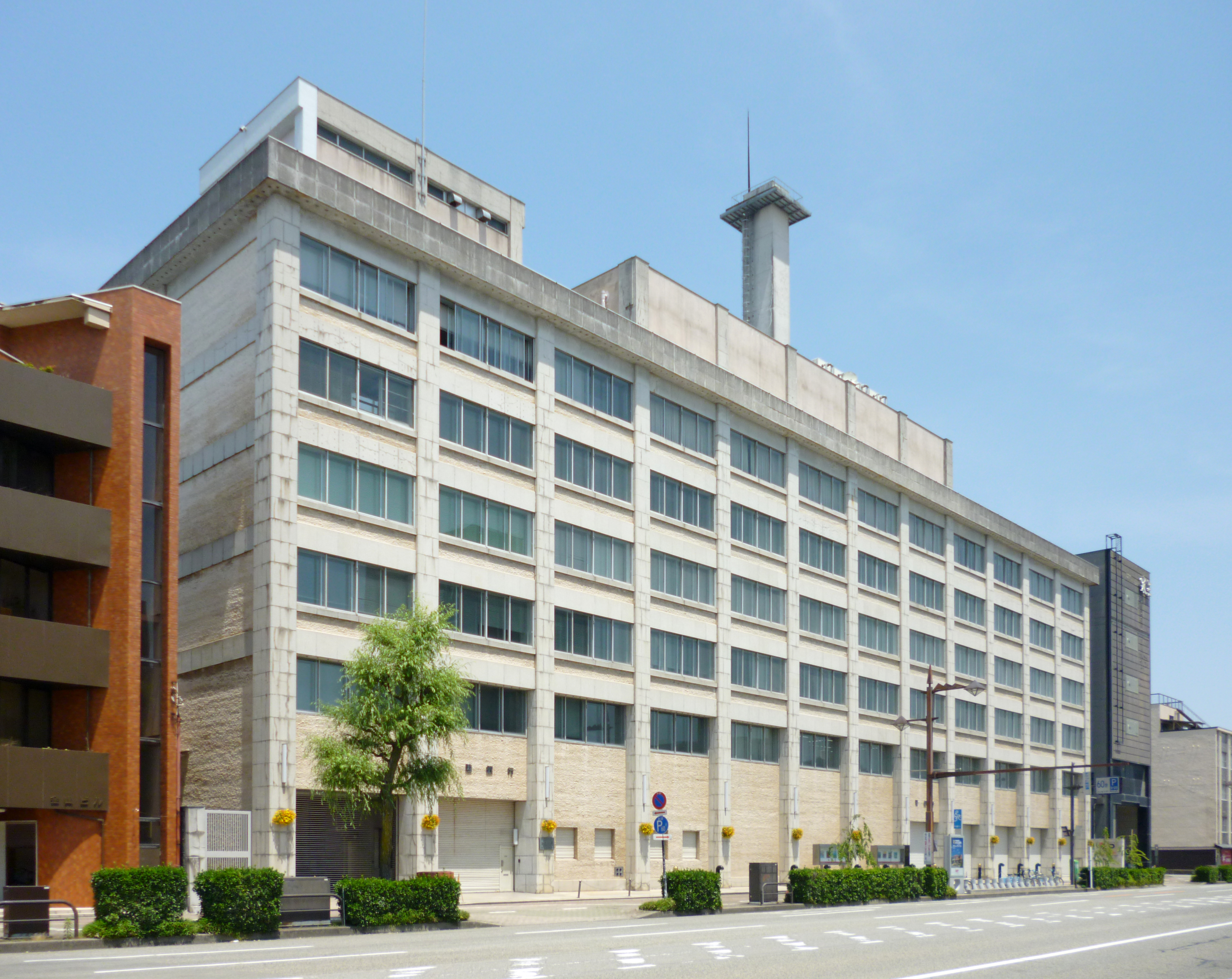
- The headquarters in Toyama, Toyama, Japan
- Type: Public
- Industry: Financial services
- Founded: 1877
- Headquarters: Toyama, Toyama, Japan
- Number of locations: 193 branches
- Area served: Hokuriku region
- Key people: Eishin Ihori (president)
- AUM: ¥5.6 trillion (approximately $51 billion) (2004)
- Number of employees: 2,798 (2016)
- Parent: Hokuhoku Financial Group
- Website: www.hokugin.co.jp

The Hokuriku Bank, Ltd. (株式会社北陸銀行, Kabushiki-gaisha Hokoriku Ginkō) is a Japanese regional bank headquartered in Toyama, Toyama; Hokoriku refers to a greater region in Japan that encompasses Fukui, Ishikawa, and Toyama prefectures. In addition to the Hokuriku region, the bank has branches in Kyoto, Osaka, Niigata, Nagano, Tokyo, Kanagawa, Gifu, Aichi, and Hokkaidō. The bank also operates overseas representative offices in Shanghai, Singapore, and New York City.

The Hokuriku Bank is a subsidiary of the Hokuhoku Financial Group.

== History ==
Hokuriku Bank was established in 1877 in Toyama. In 2003 the Hokuriku Bank altered its management structure to a holding company, creating the Hokugin Holding Company. On September 1, 2004 Hokoriku merged with Hokkaido Bank, and Hokugin Holding Company was renamed Hokuhoku Financial Group. Taken as a single entity, the holding company is the second largest regional bank in Japan in terms of assets, behind Yokohama Bank.

== Financial Issues ==
As is the case with many banks in Japan, Hokuriku Bank is dealing with non-performing loans. A Nihon Keizai Shimbun article quoted President Takagi as saying that the bank had planned to lower its non-performing loan ration to below 5% from the current ratio of 7.7% by March, 2007 - a year earlier than a previously mentioned target date. Issues that are not completely resolved include the fate of Hokuriku Bank’s branches in Hokkaidō, and the consolidation of management with Hokkaido Bank.
