= 2017 Japanese Olympic curling trials =

- Host city: Tokoro, Japan
- Dates: September 8-10
- Winner: LS Kitami
- Curling club: Tokoro CC
- Skip: Satsuki Fujisawa
- Third: Chinami Yoshida
- Second: Yumi Suzuki
- Lead: Yurika Yoshida
- Alternate: Mari Motohashi
- Finalist: Chiaki Matsumura, Chubu Electric Power

The 2017 Japanese Olympic curling trials were held from September 8 to 11 at the Advics Tokoro Curling Hall in Tokoro, Japan. The winning team represented Japan at the 2018 Winter Olympics. There was only a women's event, as the Yusuke Morozumi rink had already been chosen to represent Japan in men's curling.

The LS Kitami rink, skipped by Satsuki Fujisawa, won the event 3-1 over the Chubu Electric Power rink, skipped by Chiaki Matsumura.

== Scores ==
=== Draw 1 ===
September 8, 13:00

Team	1	2	3	4	5	6	7	8	9	10	Final
Chiaki Matsumura	0	0	1	0	0	0	0	0	X	X	1
Satsuki Fujisawa	1	1	0	0	1	4	1	1	X	X	9

=== Draw 2 ===
September 9, 09:00

Team	1	2	3	4	5	6	7	8	9	10	Final
Satsuki Fujisawa	0	1	0	0	2	0	0	1	1	0	5
Chiaki Matsumura	1	0	1	3	0	0	1	0	0	1	7

=== Draw 3 ===
September 9, 15:30

Team	1	2	3	4	5	6	7	8	9	10	Final
Chiaki Matsumura	0	0	0	1	0	2	0	0	X	X	3
Satsuki Fujisawa	1	0	3	0	2	0	0	2	X	X	8

=== Draw 4 ===
September 10, 09:00

Team	1	2	3	4	5	6	7	8	9	10	Final
Satsuki Fujisawa	3	0	0	2	0	1	2	0	0	1	9
Chiaki Matsumura	0	1	0	0	2	0	0	1	1	0	5
