= Momoha Tabata =

Japanese curler (born 2002)

- Curler
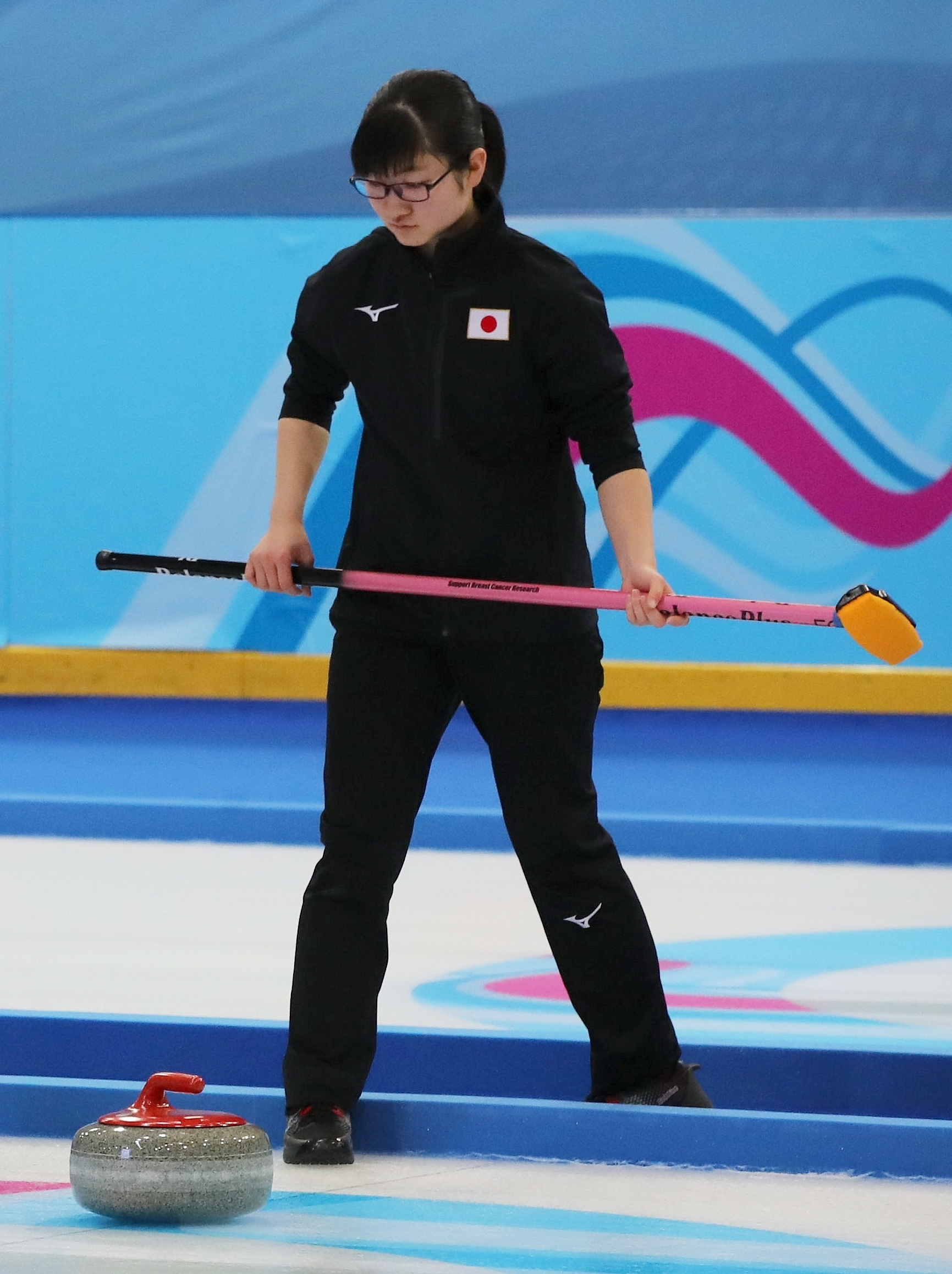
- Tabata at the 2020 Winter Youth Olympics
- Born: 8 August 2002 (age 24)

Team
- Curling club: Hokkaido Bank, Sapporo
- Skip: Miku Nihira
- Third: Momoha Tabata
- Second: Sae Yamamoto
- Lead: Mikoto Nakajima

Curling career
- Member Association: Japan
Medal record
Curling
Representing Japan
World Junior Championships
Silver medal – second place	2024 Lohja
Winter Youth Olympics
Silver medal – second place	2020 Lausanne	Mixed team
Representing Hokkaido
Japan Curling Championships
Silver medal – second place	2024 Sapporo
Silver medal – second place	2025 Yokohama
Silver medal – second place	2026 Yokohama
Bronze medal – third place	2022 Tokoro

Momoha Tabata (Japanese: 田畑百葉, Hepburn: Tabata Momoha; born 8 August 2002) is a Japanese curler. She currently throws third stones on the Hokkaido Bank curling team. At the international level, Tabata medaled silver at the 2020 Winter Youth Olympics as the third on the Japanese mixed team.

== Early life and education ==
Tabata was born in Ebetsu, Hokkaido. She attended Hokkaido Ohasa High School. In sixth grade, she applied for and was accepted to the Hokkaido Talent Athlete Discovery and Development Project at the recommendation of her parents. Alongside curling, Tabata did track and field during middle and high school.

== Career ==
In the 2020 Winter Youth Olympics, Tabata medaled silver as the third on the Japanese team in the mixed team event. She was also the captain of the Japanese national team. Tabata also skipped for the Sapporo Association team at the Japan Junior Curling Championship where she medaled gold.

In April 2021, Tabata joined the Hokkaido Bank Fortius team, led by Sayaka Yoshimura, as an alternate.

Tabata participated in the opening ceremony for the 2020 Summer Olympics in Tokyo as one of the flagbearers of the Japanese flag alongside Yoshinobu Miyake and Naoko Takahashi among others.

In December 2021, she left Fortius to become a founding member of the Hokkaido Bank Women's Curling Club after Team Yoshimura left Hokkaido Bank following the expiration of their contract.

At the 2022 Japan Curling Championships, Tabata's team finished the round robin in second place, qualifying them for the 1 vs. 2 playoff game against Loco Solare, which they lost. After losing in the semifinal to Chubu Electric Power, they medaled bronze.

At the 2023 Japan Curling Championships, Tabata's team ranked fifth in the round robin and thus overall.

== Grand Slam record ==
Key
C	Champion
F	Lost in Final
SF	Lost in Semifinal
QF	Lost in Quarterfinals
R16	Lost in the round of 16
Q	Did not advance to playoffs
T2	Played in Tier 2 event
DNP	Did not participate in event
N/A	Not a Grand Slam event that season

Event	2024–25	2025–26	2026–27
Invitational	T2	Q	Q
Masters	QF	QF	F
National	Q	Q	F
Open	Q	SF	
Players'	Q	Q	

== Teams ==
Season	Skip	Third	Second	Lead	Alternate
2017–18	Momoha Tabata	Miku Nihira	Mikoto Nakajima	Yui Ozeki	
2018–19	Momoha Tabata	Miku Nihira	Mikoto Nakajima	Yui Ozeki	
2019–20	Momoha Tabata	Honoka Sasaki	Mikoto Nakajima	Mina Kobayashi	
2020–21	Momoha Tabata	Mina Kobayashi	Mikoto Nakajima	Miku Nihira	Natsuko Ishiyama
2021–22	Sayaka Yoshimura	Kaho Onodera	Anna Ohmiya	Yumie Funayama	Momoha Tabata
2021–22	Momoha Tabata	Miku Nihira	Mikoto Nakajima	Ayami Ito	
2022–23	Momoha Tabata	Miku Nihira	Mikoto Nakajima	Sae Yamamoto	Ayami Ito
2023–24	Momoha Tabata	Miku Nihira	Sae Yamamoto	Mikoto Nakajima	Ayami Ito
2024–25	Momoha Tabata (Fourth)	Miku Nihira (Skip)	Sae Yamamoto	Mikoto Nakajima	Ayami Ito
2025–26	Momoha Tabata (Fourth)	Miku Nihira (Skip)	Sae Yamamoto	Mikoto Nakajima	
