= Sapporo International University =

Japanese university

Coordinates: 43.000598°N 141.426573°E

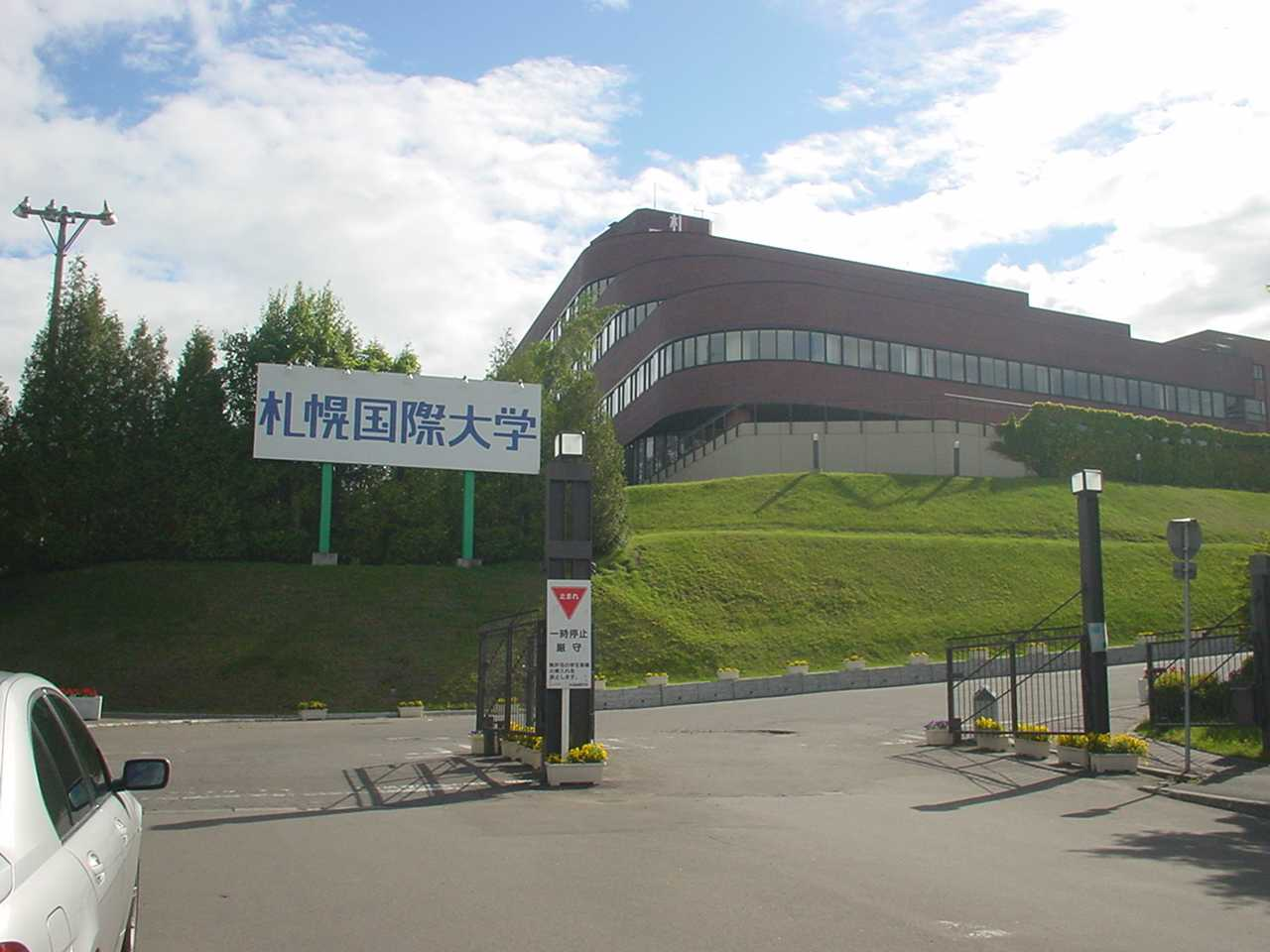
Sapporo International University

Sapporo International University (札幌国際大学, Sapporo kokusai daigaku) is a private university in Kiyota-ku, Sapporo, Hokkaido, Japan, established in 1993. The predecessor of the school was founded in 1969. The junior college division of the school is a women's college.

== Admission ==
The school begins taking applications for the first semester in December, and decisions are made by the end of January. They begin taking applications for the second semester in April, and decisions are made by the end of May.

== Programs of study offered to exchange students ==
Exchange students are offered programs of study in either Tourism/Business or Japanese history and language arts.

Students are tutored in the Japanese language. Japanese language ability is not required, but a basic knowledge of greetings and everyday language is helpful. There is no language center.

== Academic year and semester system ==
- First semester: April 3 to August 2
- Second semester: September 13 to February 4

== Student life ==
There are no dormitories. Students generally take care of living arrangements on their own.

There may be a school-provided room available nearby with bed and bedclothes, refrigerator, TV, gas range, and heater. If available, students can move in upon arrival to Sapporo. The cost of rent/administration is 28,000 yen per month. Students are required to pay a 10,000 yen cleanup fee upon departure. Other bills include electricity, water, and gas. In winter, gas charges may reach 10,000 yen. Food and other living expenses beyond housing costs listed above are estimated at around 50,000 yen per month.

=== Winter sports and nightlife ===
Sapporo is surrounded by ski resorts; the closest is only 20 minutes away. The powder snow is said to be comparable to, if not better than, that of world class resorts in the Colorado Rockies or the Swiss Alps.

Sapporo International University is in the Kiyota District, which is only 15 minutes from Shirahatayama Nordic Ski Area, the location of the 2007 FIS Nordic World Ski Tournament. It is 10 minutes from Sapporo Dome, location of the 2002 World Cup Soccer Tournament and venue to many sports and cultural events. In addition, the university is only 20 minutes from the entertainment district, Suskino, whose nightlife and restaurants attract people from all over the nation.
