= Hokkaido Bank =

Japanese bank

- Industry: Financial services
- Founded: March 5, 1951
- Headquarters: Sapporo, Japan
- Number of locations: 134 branches (2005)
- Area served: Hokkaidō
- Key people: Yuji Kanema (President)
- Total assets: ¥33.8 trillion (approximately US$30.7 billion) (2005)
- Number of employees: 1,902 (2005)
- Parent: Hokuhoku Financial Group
- Website: www.hokkaidobank.co.jp

Hokkaido Bank (北海道銀行, Hokkaidō Ginkō) is a Japanese regional bank that is headquartered in Sapporo, Hokkaidō. The Hokkaido Bank is a subsidiary of the Hokuhoku Financial Group as a result of a merger with the Hokuriku Bank on September 1, 2004. The Hokkaido Bank has 134 domestic branches, with 131 of them in Hokkaidō, and one each in the Tohoku region, Tokyo, and Osaka.

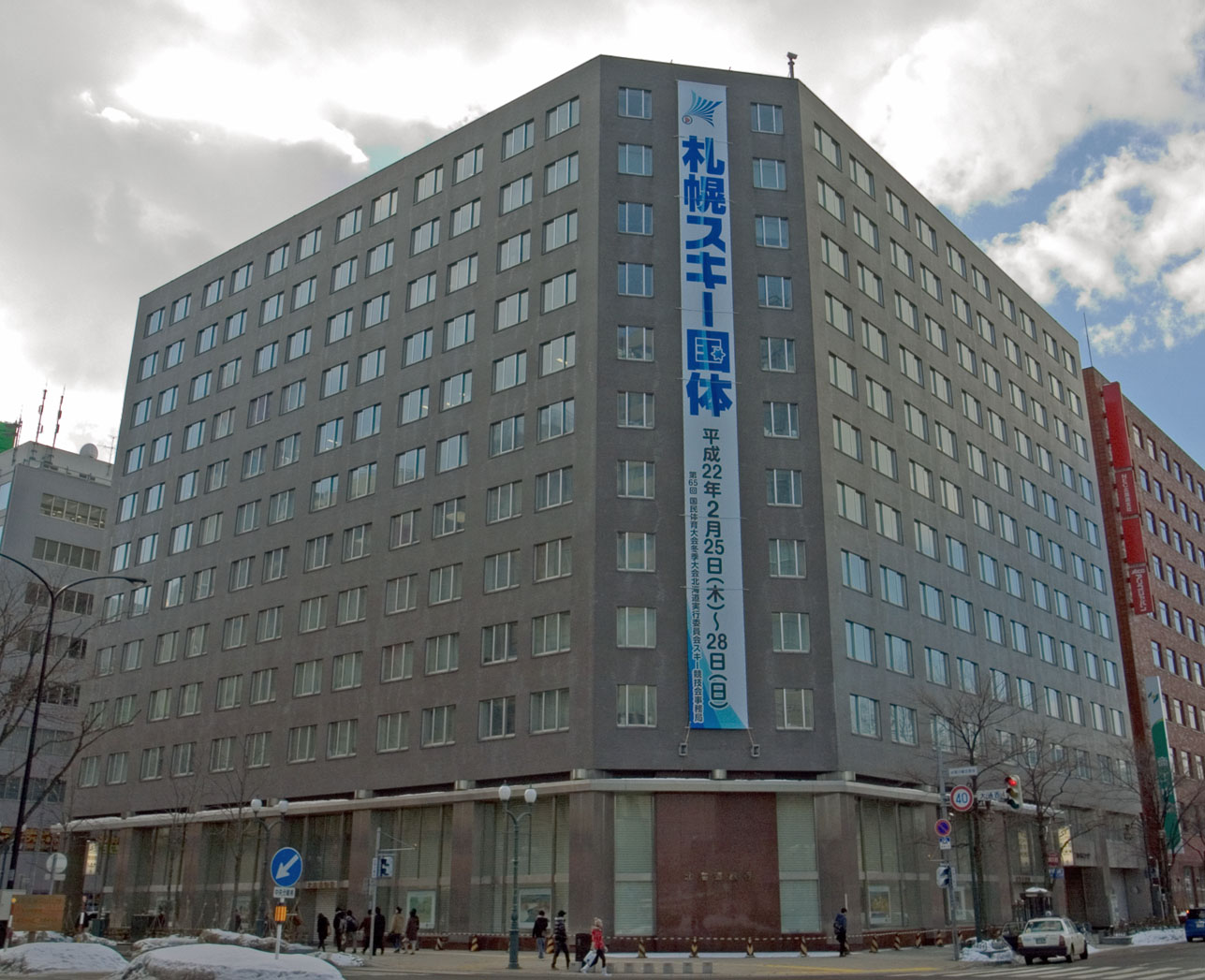
The main office of Hokkaido Bank in Sapporo

== History ==
The Hokkaido Bank was established on March 5, 1951, in Sapporo. In 1997, Hokkaido Bank entered into merger talks with the embattled Hokkaido Takushoku Bank. However, these talks broke off and Hokkaido Takushoku Bank subsequently entered bankruptcy. On May 24, 2002, Hokkaido Bank and Hokuriku Bank agreed to business tie-ups. Approximately one year later on May 23, 2003, the banks agreed to merge management. On September 1, 2004, both banks became subsidiaries of the Hokuhoku Financial Group.
