= 2025 Pan Continental Curling Championships =

Annual curling tournament

- Host city: Virginia, Minnesota, United States (A Division); Eveleth, Minnesota, United States (B Division)
- Arena: Iron Trail Motors Event Center (A Division); Curl Mesabi (B Division)
- Dates: October 19–26
- Men's winner: Canada
- Curling club: The Glencoe Club, Calgary
- Skip: Brad Jacobs
- Third: Marc Kennedy
- Second: Brett Gallant
- Lead: Ben Hebert
- Alternate: Tyler Tardi
- Coach: Paul Webster
- Finalist: United States (Shuster)
- Women's winner: China
- Curling club: CSO Curling Club, Beijing
- Skip: Wang Rui
- Third: Han Yu
- Second: Dong Ziqi
- Lead: Jiang Jiayi
- Alternate: Su Tingyu
- Coach: Zang Jialiang
- Finalist: Canada (Homan)

The 2025 Pan Continental Curling Championships (branded as the 2025 United States Steel Pan Continental Curling Championships for sponsorship reasons) was held from October 19 to 26 at the Iron Trail Motors Event Center (A Division) and Curl Mesabi (B Division) in Virginia and Eveleth, Minnesota, United States. The event was used to qualify teams for the 2026 World Curling Championships. Both men's and women's events consisted of an A Division and B Division.

In the men's competition, the United States automatically qualified as the host nation for the 2026 World Men's Curling Championship, which will be held in Ogden, Utah. Furthermore, the top four teams from the A Division will also secure qualification for the championship.

On the women's side, Canada earned automatic qualification as the host nation for the 2026 World Women's Curling Championship, scheduled to be held in Calgary, Alberta. In addition to Canada, the top five teams from the A Division will also qualify for the World Championship, marking the first time that six teams from the Pan-Continental zone will advance to the event. The additional qualification spot was awarded due to a points tie between the Pan Continental Curling Championships (PCCC) and the European Curling Championships (ECC) at the 2025 World Women's Curling Championship. In the event of a tie, the zone of the championship-winning team (Canada), earns the additional spot.

This will also mark the last edition of the Pan Continental Curling Championships, with World Curling announcing that it will be replaced through the implementation of the new World Curling Championship B and C Divisions, which will qualify men's and women's teams for the World Championships starting in the 2026–27 curling season. Member associations who will compete in next season's inaugural World Curling Championship B and C Divisions will be determined by World Curling at a later date.

== Medallists ==
A Division	Gold	Silver	Bronze
Men	Canada; Brad Jacobs; Marc Kennedy; Brett Gallant; Ben Hebert; Tyler Tardi	United States; John Shuster; Chris Plys; Colin Hufman; Matt Hamilton; Daniel Casper	Japan; Riku Yanagisawa (Fourth); Tsuyoshi Yamaguchi (Skip); Takeru Yamamoto; Satoshi Koizumi; Shingo Usui
Women	China; Wang Rui; Han Yu; Dong Ziqi; Jiang Jiayi; Su Tingyu	Canada; Rachel Homan; Tracy Fleury; Emma Miskew; Sarah Wilkes; Rachelle Brown	South Korea; Gim Eun-ji; Kim Min-ji; Kim Su-ji; Seol Ye-eun; Seol Ye-ji

B Division	Gold	Silver	Bronze
Men	Hong Kong; Woody Cheng (Fourth); Jason Chang (Skip); Jacky Chung; Ronnie Ma; King Yu	Kazakhstan; Abylaikhan Zhuzbay; Adil Zhumagozha; Aidos Alliyar; Dmitriy Garagul; Ibragim Tastemir	Guyana; Rayad Husain; Christopher Medford; Baul Persaud; Darryl Narain; Rohan Singh
Women	Philippines; Katie Dubberstein; Leilani Dubberstein; Jessica Byers; Lindsey Schmalz	Kazakhstan; Merey Tastemir (Fourth); Angelina Ebauyer (Skip); Tilsimay Alliyarova; Angelina Penyaeva; Kristina Rakhmanova	Hong Kong; Ling-Yue Hung; Ada Shang; Pianpian Hu; Ka Chan; Helen Li

== Men ==
=== A division ===
==== Qualification ====
The following nations qualified to participate in the 2025 Pan Continental Curling Championship A Division:

Event	Vacancies	Qualified
2024 Pan Continental Curling Championships A Division	7	China; Japan; United States; Canada; South Korea; Australia; New Zealand
2024 Pan Continental Curling Championships B Division	1	Philippines
TOTAL	8	

==== Teams ====
The teams are listed as follows:

Australia	Canada	China	Japan
Fourth: Tanner Davis; Third: Matt Panoussi; Second: Steve Johns; Skip: Hugh Millikin; Alternate: Geoff Davis	Skip: Brad Jacobs; Third: Marc Kennedy; Second: Brett Gallant; Lead: Ben Hebert; Alternate: Tyler Tardi	Skip: Xu Xiaoming; Third: Fei Xueqing; Second: Li Zhichao; Lead: Xu Jingtao; Alternate: Yang Bohao	Fourth: Riku Yanagisawa; Skip: Tsuyoshi Yamaguchi; Second: Takeru Yamamoto; Lead: Satoshi Koizumi; Alternate: Shingo Usui
New Zealand	Philippines	South Korea	United States
Skip: Sean Becker; Third: Jared Palanuik; Second: Scott Becker; Lead: Warren Dobson; Alternate: James Becker	Skip: Marc Pfister; Third: Christian Haller; Second: Enrico Pfister; Lead: Brayden Carpenter; Alternate: Alan Frei	Skip: Kim Soo-hyuk; Third: Kim Chang-min; Second: Yoo Min-hyeon; Lead: Kim Hak-kyun; Alternate: Jeon Jae-ik	Skip: John Shuster; Third: Chris Plys; Second: Colin Hufman; Lead: Matt Hamilton; Alternate: Daniel Casper

==== Round robin standings ====
Final Round Robin Standings

Key
Teams to Playoffs and Qualified for the 2026 World Men's Curling Championship
Team Qualified for the 2026 World Men's Curling Championship

Country	Skip	W	L	W–L	PF	PA	EW	EL	BE	SE	S%	DSC
Canada	Brad Jacobs	7	0	–	63	24	30	18	2	8	90.4%	15.72
United States	John Shuster	6	1	–	61	25	30	20	6	10	87.4%	15.08
Japan	Tsuyoshi Yamaguchi	5	2	–	45	39	25	24	7	4	86.5%	19.61
China	Xu Xiaoming	4	3	–	50	40	29	24	3	8	85.3%	56.37
South Korea	Kim Soo-hyuk	3	4	–	47	52	29	29	4	10	83.2%	36.29
Philippines	Marc Pfister	2	5	–	38	48	27	28	2	6	82.7%	37.68
New Zealand	Sean Becker	1	6	–	26	56	19	32	2	3	74.2%	61.48
Australia	Hugh Millikin	0	7	–	20	66	17	31	2	0	69.2%	48.01

Round Robin Summary Table
Pos.	Country	Australia	Canada	China	Japan	New Zealand	Philippines	South Korea	United States	Record
8	Australia	—	2–8	3–9	3–9	5–9	3–9	2–9	2–13	0–7
1	Canada	8–2	—	10–4	8–3	7–1	10–3	14–6	6–5	7–0
4	China	9–3	4–10	—	7–9	8–2	7–5	10–3	5–8	4–3
3	Japan	9–3	3–8	9–7	—	7–3	7–4	7–6	3–8	5–2
7	New Zealand	9–5	1–7	2–8	3–7	—	3–7	4–11	4–11	1–6
6	Philippines	9–3	3–10	5–7	4–7	7–3	—	8–9	2–9	2–5
5	South Korea	9–2	6–14	3–10	6–7	11–4	9–8	—	3–7	3–4
2	United States	13–2	5–6	8–5	8–3	11–4	9–2	7–3	—	6–1

==== Round robin results ====
All draw times are listed in Central Time (UTC−05:00).

===== Draw 1 =====
Monday, October 20, 19:00

Sheet A	1	2	3	4	5	6	7	8	9	10	Final
Australia (Millikin)	0	1	0	0	1	0	1	0	X	X	3
Philippines (Pfister) 🔨	3	0	3	1	0	1	0	1	X	X	9

Sheet B	1	2	3	4	5	6	7	8	9	10	Final
South Korea (Kim) 🔨	1	1	0	2	0	1	0	0	2	4	11
New Zealand (Becker)	0	0	2	0	0	0	1	1	0	0	4

Sheet C	1	2	3	4	5	6	7	8	9	10	Final
Canada (Jacobs) 🔨	1	1	0	2	0	0	3	0	3	X	10
China (Xu)	0	0	2	0	0	1	0	1	0	X	4

Sheet D	1	2	3	4	5	6	7	8	9	10	Final
Japan (Yamaguchi)	0	0	0	0	0	1	0	0	2	X	3
United States (Shuster) 🔨	0	0	2	0	1	0	3	2	0	X	8

===== Draw 2 =====
Tuesday, October 21, 14:00

Sheet A	1	2	3	4	5	6	7	8	9	10	Final
New Zealand (Becker)	0	0	0	1	0	0	1	X	X	X	2
China (Xu) 🔨	0	3	1	0	3	1	0	X	X	X	8

Sheet B	1	2	3	4	5	6	7	8	9	10	Final
Japan (Yamaguchi) 🔨	1	0	3	0	2	1	2	X	X	X	9
Australia (Millikin)	0	1	0	2	0	0	0	X	X	X	3

Sheet C	1	2	3	4	5	6	7	8	9	10	Final
United States (Shuster) 🔨	0	1	1	1	1	2	0	0	1	X	7
South Korea (Kim)	1	0	0	0	0	0	1	1	0	X	3

Sheet D	1	2	3	4	5	6	7	8	9	10	Final
Philippines (Pfister)	0	1	0	0	0	1	0	1	0	X	3
Canada (Jacobs) 🔨	2	0	1	1	0	0	2	0	4	X	10

===== Draw 3 =====
Wednesday, October 22, 9:00

Sheet A	1	2	3	4	5	6	7	8	9	10	Final
South Korea (Kim)	0	3	0	0	2	0	1	0	X	X	6
Canada (Jacobs) 🔨	3	0	1	1	0	4	0	5	X	X	14

Sheet B	1	2	3	4	5	6	7	8	9	10	Final
United States (Shuster) 🔨	2	0	0	2	0	2	1	2	X	X	9
Philippines (Pfister)	0	1	0	0	1	0	0	0	X	X	2

Sheet C	1	2	3	4	5	6	7	8	9	10	Final
China (Xu) 🔨	2	0	1	0	2	0	2	2	X	X	9
Australia (Millikin)	0	0	0	1	0	2	0	0	X	X	3

Sheet D	1	2	3	4	5	6	7	8	9	10	Final
New Zealand (Becker)	0	1	0	1	0	0	0	1	0	X	3
Japan (Yamaguchi) 🔨	2	0	1	0	0	2	1	0	1	X	7

===== Draw 4 =====
Wednesday, October 22, 19:00

Sheet A	1	2	3	4	5	6	7	8	9	10	Final
United States (Shuster) 🔨	3	4	0	0	6	0	X	X	X	X	13
Australia (Millikin)	0	0	0	1	0	1	X	X	X	X	2

Sheet B	1	2	3	4	5	6	7	8	9	10	Final
New Zealand (Becker)	0	0	0	0	0	1	X	X	X	X	1
Canada (Jacobs) 🔨	3	2	0	1	1	0	X	X	X	X	7

Sheet C	1	2	3	4	5	6	7	8	9	10	Final
Philippines (Pfister)	0	0	0	0	1	0	2	0	1	X	4
Japan (Yamaguchi) 🔨	0	0	0	2	0	3	0	2	0	X	7

Sheet D	1	2	3	4	5	6	7	8	9	10	Final
China (Xu)	0	1	1	3	0	2	0	3	X	X	10
South Korea (Kim) 🔨	0	0	0	0	1	0	2	0	X	X	3

===== Draw 5 =====
Thursday, October 23, 14:00

Sheet A	1	2	3	4	5	6	7	8	9	10	Final
Japan (Yamaguchi)	0	1	0	2	0	0	0	4	0	0	7
South Korea (Kim) 🔨	0	0	1	0	0	2	1	0	1	1	6

Sheet B	1	2	3	4	5	6	7	8	9	10	Final
Philippines (Pfister)	0	2	0	1	1	0	0	1	0	X	5
China (Xu) 🔨	1	0	1	0	0	1	2	0	2	X	7

Sheet C	1	2	3	4	5	6	7	8	9	10	Final
New Zealand (Becker)	0	1	0	1	1	0	1	0	X	X	4
United States (Shuster) 🔨	3	0	3	0	0	1	0	4	X	X	11

Sheet D	1	2	3	4	5	6	7	8	9	10	Final
Canada (Jacobs) 🔨	2	0	2	1	3	0	X	X	X	X	8
Australia (Millikin)	0	1	0	0	0	1	X	X	X	X	2

===== Draw 6 =====
Friday, October 24, 9:00

Sheet A	1	2	3	4	5	6	7	8	9	10	Final
Philippines (Pfister) 🔨	2	1	1	1	0	0	2	0	X	X	7
New Zealand (Becker)	0	0	0	0	2	0	0	1	X	X	3

Sheet B	1	2	3	4	5	6	7	8	9	10	Final
Australia (Millikin) 🔨	1	0	0	0	1	0	0	X	X	X	2
South Korea (Kim)	0	3	3	1	0	1	1	X	X	X	9

Sheet C	1	2	3	4	5	6	7	8	9	10	Final
Japan (Yamaguchi)	0	0	2	0	1	0	X	X	X	X	3
Canada (Jacobs) 🔨	2	0	0	3	0	3	X	X	X	X	8

Sheet D	1	2	3	4	5	6	7	8	9	10	Final
United States (Shuster) 🔨	0	1	0	3	0	0	1	0	0	3	8
China (Xu)	0	0	2	0	1	0	0	0	2	0	5

===== Draw 7 =====
Friday, October 24, 19:00

Sheet A	1	2	3	4	5	6	7	8	9	10	Final
China (Xu)	0	0	2	0	2	0	1	0	2	0	7
Japan (Yamaguchi) 🔨	0	2	0	2	0	3	0	1	0	1	9

Sheet B	1	2	3	4	5	6	7	8	9	10	11	Final
Canada (Jacobs) 🔨	0	0	2	0	0	2	0	1	0	0	1	6
United States (Shuster)	0	0	0	0	2	0	1	0	1	1	0	5

Sheet C	1	2	3	4	5	6	7	8	9	10	Final
Australia (Millikin) 🔨	1	0	0	1	0	2	0	1	X	X	5
New Zealand (Becker)	0	2	3	0	2	0	2	0	X	X	9

Sheet D	1	2	3	4	5	6	7	8	9	10	11	Final
South Korea (Kim) 🔨	0	1	0	3	0	1	0	3	0	0	1	9
Philippines (Pfister)	0	0	1	0	2	0	2	0	2	1	0	8

==== Playoffs ====
Semifinals
1	Canada	5
4	China	4
2	United States	9
3	Japan	3

Gold medal game
1	Canada	7
2	United States	3
Bronze medal game
4	China	5
3	Japan	6

===== Semifinals =====
Saturday, October 25, 14:00

Sheet A	1	2	3	4	5	6	7	8	9	10	Final
Canada (Jacobs) 🔨	1	0	1	0	1	0	1	0	0	1	5
China (Xu)	0	1	0	1	0	1	0	1	0	0	4

Player percentages
Canada		China	
Ben Hebert	94%	Xu Jingtao	91%
Brett Gallant	90%	Li Zhichao	91%
Marc Kennedy	100%	Fei Xueqing	78%
Brad Jacobs	93%	Xu Xiaoming	88%
Total	94%	Total	87%

Sheet D	1	2	3	4	5	6	7	8	9	10	Final
United States (Shuster) 🔨	1	0	0	0	3	0	5	0	X	X	9
Japan (Yamaguchi)	0	0	0	1	0	1	0	1	X	X	3

Player percentages
United States		Japan	
Matt Hamilton	89%	Satoshi Koizumi	86%
Colin Hufman	70%	Takeru Yamamoto	66%
Chris Plys	94%	Tsuyoshi Yamaguchi	95%
John Shuster	100%	Riku Yanagisawa	78%
Total	88%	Total	81%

===== Bronze medal game =====
Sunday, October 26, 8:30

Sheet B	1	2	3	4	5	6	7	8	9	10	Final
China (Xu)	1	0	2	0	0	0	0	0	2	0	5
Japan (Yamaguchi) 🔨	0	1	0	0	1	0	1	1	0	2	6

Player percentages
China		Japan	
Xu Jingtao	94%	Satoshi Koizumi	94%
Li Zhichao	89%	Takeru Yamamoto	85%
Fei Xueqing	81%	Tsuyoshi Yamaguchi	94%
Xu Xiaoming	79%	Riku Yanagisawa	82%
Total	86%	Total	89%

===== Gold medal game =====
Sunday, October 26, 12:30

Sheet B	1	2	3	4	5	6	7	8	9	10	Final
Canada (Jacobs) 🔨	0	0	0	1	0	2	0	0	2	2	7
United States (Shuster)	0	0	0	0	2	0	0	1	0	0	3

Player percentages
Canada		United States	
Ben Hebert	96%	Matt Hamilton	85%
Brett Gallant	90%	Colin Hufman	90%
Marc Kennedy	91%	Chris Plys	83%
Brad Jacobs	89%	John Shuster	91%
Total	92%	Total	87%

==== Player percentages ====
Round robin only

Leads	%
(Japan) Satoshi Koizumi	92.1
(Canada) Ben Hebert	91.1
(United States) Matt Hamilton	88.7
(China) Xu Jingtao	88.4
(South Korea) Kim Hak-kyun	88.3

Seconds	%
(Canada) Brett Gallant	91.1
(United States) Colin Hufman	86.1
(Japan) Takeru Yamamoto	86.0
(Philippines) Enrico Pfister	85.1
(South Korea) Yoo Min-hyeon	82.5

Thirds	%
(United States) Chris Plys	90.2
(Canada) Marc Kennedy	89.8
(South Korea) Kim Chang-min	86.0
(Japan) Tsuyoshi Yamaguchi (Skip)	86.0
(China) Fei Xueqing	83.3

Skips	%
(Canada) Brad Jacobs	90.7
(China) Xu Xiaoming	87.3
(United States) John Shuster	86.2
(Japan) Riku Yanagisawa (Fourth)	81.6
(Philippines) Marc Pfister	80.8

==== Final standings ====
Key
Teams Advance to the 2026 World Men's Curling Championship

Place	Team
1st place, gold medalist(s)	Canada
2nd place, silver medalist(s)	United States
3rd place, bronze medalist(s)	Japan
4	China
5	South Korea
6	Philippines
7	New Zealand
8	Australia

=== B division ===
==== Teams ====
Brazil	Chinese Taipei	Guyana	Hong Kong
Skip: Marcelo Cabral De Mello; Third: Marcio Rodrigues; Second: Nuno Rodrigues; Lead: Filipe Nunes; Alternate: Arthur Camelo	Skip: Lin Ting-li; Third: Chang Che-lun; Second: Lin Chen-han; Lead: Lin Bo-hao	Skip: Rayad Husain; Third: Christopher Medford; Second: Baul Persaud; Lead: Darryl Narain; Alternate: Rohan Singh	Fourth: Woody Cheng; Skip: Jason Chang; Second: Jacky Chung; Lead: Ronnie Ma; Alternate: King Yu
India	Kazakhstan	Mexico	Nigeria
Skip: P. N. Raju; Third: Girithar Anthay Suthakaran; Second: Sudheer Reddy; Lead: Kishan Vasant	Skip: Abylaikhan Zhuzbay; Third: Adil Zhumagozha; Second: Aidos Alliyar; Lead: Dmitriy Garagul; Alternate: Ibragim Tastemir	Skip: Diego Tompkins; Third: Ramy Cohen; Second: Mateo Tompkins; Lead: Joaquin Villanueva Figueroa	Skip: Harold Woods III; Third: T. J. Cole; Second: Fabian Contreras; Lead: Julian Contreras
Puerto Rico	Saudi Arabia	Thailand	
Skip: Israel Acosta; Third: Kyle Fisher; Second: Emanuel Pappaterra; Lead: Jonathan Vargas; Alternate: Jose Sepulveda	Skip: Amar Masalmeh; Third: Suleiman Alaqel; Second: Mohammad Aldaraan; Lead: Hussain Hagawi; Alternate: Abdullah Alzahrani	Skip: Teekawin Jearateetawit; Third: Prawes Kaewjeen; Second: Nuth Boonyaporn; Lead: Pongsak Mahattanasakul; Alternate: Aongart Maneenet	

==== Round robin standings ====
Final Round Robin Standings

Key
Teams to Playoffs

Country	Skip	W	L	W–L	DSC
Kazakhstan	Abylaikhan Zhuzbay	9	1	–	57.30
Hong Kong	Jason Chang	8	2	1–0	79.37
India	P. N. Raju	8	2	0–1	66.87
Guyana	Rayad Husain	7	3	–	63.17
Brazil	Marcelo Cabral de Mello	6	4	1–0	113.78
Mexico	Diego Tompkins	6	4	0–1	73.21
Chinese Taipei	Lin Ting-li	4	6	–	135.72
Puerto Rico	Israel Acosta	3	7	–	99.52
Saudi Arabia	Amar Masalmeh	2	8	1–0	130.66
Thailand	Teekawin Jearateetawit	2	8	0–1	94.70
Nigeria	Harold Woods III	0	10	–	107.91

Round Robin Summary Table
Pos.	Country	Brazil	Chinese Taipei	Guyana	Hong Kong	India	Kazakhstan	Mexico	Nigeria	Puerto Rico	Saudi Arabia	Thailand	Record
5	Brazil	—	9–2	5–9	2–11	0–10	2–8	11–3	10–4	10–8	9–3	8–5	6–4
7	Chinese Taipei	2–9	—	3–5	3–10	3–9	2–10	3–13	8–3	9–1	9–5	10–3	4–6
4	Guyana	9–5	5–3	—	7–8	8–5	7–12	10–12	13–2	12–2	12–5	16–3	7–3
2	Hong Kong	11–2	10–3	8–7	—	7–6	3–10	10–3	15–3	5–6	10–5	14–0	8–2
3	India	10–0	9–3	5–8	6–7	—	11–9	10–8	12–6	9–6	9–2	13–5	8–2
1	Kazakhstan	8–2	10–2	12–7	10–3	9–11	—	12–4	14–0	13–4	16–0	13–3	9–1
6	Mexico	3–11	13–3	12–10	3–10	8–10	4–12	—	16–1	11–8	9–1	13–2	6–4
11	Nigeria	4–10	3–8	2–13	3–15	6–12	0–14	1–16	—	4–10	7–8	10–11	0–10
8	Puerto Rico	8–10	1–9	2–12	6–5	6–9	4–13	8–11	10–4	—	10–1	8–10	3–7
9	Saudi Arabia	3–9	5–9	5–12	5–10	2–9	0–16	1–9	8–7	1–10	—	14–8	2–8
10	Thailand	5–8	3–10	3–16	0–14	5–13	3–13	2–13	11–10	10–8	8–14	—	2–8

==== Round robin results ====
All draw times are listed in Central Time (UTC−05:00).

===== Draw 1 =====
Sunday, October 19, 9:00

Sheet E	1	2	3	4	5	6	7	8	9	10	Final
Thailand (Jearateetawit) 🔨	0	0	0	1	1	0	1	0	X	X	3
Guyana (Husain)	1	3	3	0	0	4	0	5	X	X	16

Sheet F	1	2	3	4	5	6	7	8	9	10	Final
Brazil (Mello)	0	2	1	1	2	2	1	0	2	X	11
Mexico (Tompkins) 🔨	1	0	0	0	0	0	0	2	0	X	3

Sheet G	1	2	3	4	5	6	7	8	9	10	Final
Puerto Rico (Acosta)	0	1	1	0	1	0	1	0	1	1	6
Hong Kong (Chang) 🔨	1	0	0	1	0	2	0	1	0	0	5

Sheet H	1	2	3	4	5	6	7	8	9	10	Final
Kazakhstan (Zhuzbay) 🔨	5	1	3	4	1	2	X	X	X	X	16
Saudi Arabia (Masalmeh)	0	0	0	0	0	0	X	X	X	X	0

Sheet J	1	2	3	4	5	6	7	8	9	10	Final
Nigeria (Woods III)	1	0	0	1	0	1	0	0	0	X	3
Chinese Taipei (Lin) 🔨	0	3	1	0	0	0	2	1	1	X	8

===== Draw 2 =====
Monday, October 20, 9:00

Sheet E	1	2	3	4	5	6	7	8	9	10	Final
Saudi Arabia (Masalmeh)	0	0	0	2	0	0	X	X	X	X	2
India (Raju) 🔨	1	2	3	0	1	2	X	X	X	X	9

Sheet F	1	2	3	4	5	6	7	8	9	10	Final
Hong Kong (Chang) 🔨	2	3	0	0	5	0	3	2	X	X	15
Nigeria (Woods III)	0	0	1	0	0	2	0	0	X	X	3

Sheet G	1	2	3	4	5	6	7	8	9	10	Final
Thailand (Jearateetawit) 🔨	0	1	0	0	0	0	1	0	X	X	2
Mexico (Tompkins)	2	0	3	1	1	3	0	3	X	X	13

Sheet H	1	2	3	4	5	6	7	8	9	10	Final
Chinese Taipei (Lin)	0	1	0	1	0	0	0	X	X	X	2
Brazil (Mello) 🔨	1	0	1	0	4	1	2	X	X	X	9

Sheet J	1	2	3	4	5	6	7	8	9	10	Final
Puerto Rico (Acosta)	0	0	0	1	0	0	1	X	X	X	2
Guyana (Husain) 🔨	3	1	3	0	2	3	0	X	X	X	12

===== Draw 3 =====
Monday, October 20, 19:00

Sheet E	1	2	3	4	5	6	7	8	9	10	Final
Kazakhstan (Zhuzbay) 🔨	1	4	0	1	4	0	3	0	X	X	13
Puerto Rico (Acosta)	0	0	2	0	0	1	0	1	X	X	4

Sheet F	1	2	3	4	5	6	7	8	9	10	Final
Thailand (Jearateetawit)	0	0	0	0	3	0	0	0	X	X	3
Chinese Taipei (Lin) 🔨	2	2	1	1	0	1	1	2	X	X	10

Sheet G	1	2	3	4	5	6	7	8	9	10	Final
India (Raju) 🔨	5	0	0	3	1	0	1	0	2	X	12
Nigeria (Woods III)	0	2	1	0	0	1	0	2	0	X	6

Sheet H	1	2	3	4	5	6	7	8	9	10	11	Final
Guyana (Husain)	0	0	2	0	2	1	0	3	0	2	0	10
Mexico (Tompkins) 🔨	2	3	0	2	0	0	2	0	1	0	2	12

Sheet J	1	2	3	4	5	6	7	8	9	10	Final
Hong Kong (Chang) 🔨	0	2	3	1	3	1	1	X	X	X	11
Brazil (Mello)	2	0	0	0	0	0	0	X	X	X	2

===== Draw 4 =====
Tuesday, October 21, 9:00

Sheet E	1	2	3	4	5	6	7	8	9	10	Final
Mexico (Tompkins) 🔨	0	1	1	0	0	0	1	0	X	X	3
Hong Kong (Chang)	2	0	0	1	3	1	0	3	X	X	10

Sheet F	1	2	3	4	5	6	7	8	9	10	Final
Guyana (Husain) 🔨	0	0	0	0	3	2	0	2	1	X	8
India (Raju)	1	1	0	2	0	0	1	0	0	X	5

Sheet G	1	2	3	4	5	6	7	8	9	10	Final
Chinese Taipei (Lin) 🔨	2	0	2	1	0	0	3	1	0	X	9
Saudi Arabia (Masalmeh)	0	1	0	0	1	2	0	0	1	X	5

Sheet H	1	2	3	4	5	6	7	8	9	10	Final
Nigeria (Woods III)	0	1	0	1	0	2	0	0	X	X	4
Puerto Rico (Acosta) 🔨	2	0	2	0	2	0	2	2	X	X	10

Sheet J	1	2	3	4	5	6	7	8	9	10	Final
Kazakhstan (Zhuzbay) 🔨	3	0	2	0	0	6	2	X	X	X	13
Thailand (Jearateetawit)	0	1	0	1	1	0	0	X	X	X	3

===== Draw 5 =====
Tuesday, October 21, 19:00

Sheet E	1	2	3	4	5	6	7	8	9	10	Final
Brazil (Mello) 🔨	1	2	0	2	1	0	3	1	X	X	10
Nigeria (Woods III)	0	0	3	0	0	1	0	0	X	X	4

Sheet F	1	2	3	4	5	6	7	8	9	10	Final
Puerto Rico (Acosta) 🔨	0	2	2	2	3	1	X	X	X	X	10
Saudi Arabia (Masalmeh)	1	0	0	0	0	0	X	X	X	X	1

Sheet G	1	2	3	4	5	6	7	8	9	10	Final
Guyana (Husain)	0	0	2	0	3	1	0	1	0	X	7
Kazakhstan (Zhuzbay) 🔨	2	1	0	2	0	0	3	0	4	X	12

Sheet H	1	2	3	4	5	6	7	8	9	10	Final
Thailand (Jearateetawit)	0	0	0	0	0	0	X	X	X	X	0
Hong Kong (Chang) 🔨	1	2	2	2	4	3	X	X	X	X	14

Sheet J	1	2	3	4	5	6	7	8	9	10	Final
India (Raju)	0	3	0	0	1	0	2	0	4	X	10
Mexico (Tompkins) 🔨	1	0	1	2	0	2	0	2	0	X	7

===== Draw 6 =====
Wednesday, October 22, 9:00

Sheet E	1	2	3	4	5	6	7	8	9	10	Final
Guyana (Husain) 🔨	1	0	0	1	1	0	0	1	1	X	5
Chinese Taipei (Lin)	0	0	1	0	0	1	1	0	0	X	3

Sheet F	1	2	3	4	5	6	7	8	9	10	Final
Mexico (Tompkins) 🔨	1	0	2	0	1	0	0	0	X	X	4
Kazakhstan (Zhuzbay)	0	1	0	3	0	4	1	3	X	X	12

Sheet G	1	2	3	4	5	6	7	8	9	10	Final
Brazil (Mello) 🔨	2	0	0	1	0	1	0	2	1	1	8
Thailand (Jearateetawit)	0	1	1	0	1	0	2	0	0	0	5

Sheet H	1	2	3	4	5	6	7	8	9	10	Final
Puerto Rico (Acosta)	0	1	0	1	0	0	2	0	2	0	6
India (Raju) 🔨	0	0	4	0	1	0	0	1	0	3	9

Sheet J	1	2	3	4	5	6	7	8	9	10	Final
Saudi Arabia (Masalmeh) 🔨	1	0	0	0	3	0	0	2	1	1	8
Nigeria (Woods III)	0	1	2	1	0	1	2	0	0	0	7

===== Draw 7 =====
Wednesday, October 22, 19:00

Sheet E	1	2	3	4	5	6	7	8	9	10	Final
Hong Kong (Chang) 🔨	2	0	0	1	2	0	4	1	X	X	10
Saudi Arabia (Masalmeh)	0	3	1	0	0	1	0	0	X	X	5

Sheet F	1	2	3	4	5	6	7	8	9	10	Final
India (Raju) 🔨	2	1	1	0	3	2	1	X	X	X	10
Brazil (Mello)	0	0	0	0	0	0	0	X	X	X	0

Sheet G	1	2	3	4	5	6	7	8	9	10	Final
Kazakhstan (Zhuzbay) 🔨	4	0	1	2	3	0	X	X	X	X	10
Chinese Taipei (Lin)	0	1	0	0	0	1	X	X	X	X	2

Sheet H	1	2	3	4	5	6	7	8	9	10	Final
Mexico (Tompkins)	3	1	2	6	0	4	X	X	X	X	16
Nigeria (Woods III) 🔨	0	0	0	0	1	0	X	X	X	X	1

Sheet J	1	2	3	4	5	6	7	8	9	10	Final
Thailand (Jearateetawit) 🔨	1	0	0	4	0	0	3	1	0	1	10
Puerto Rico (Acosta)	0	2	2	0	2	1	0	0	1	0	8

===== Draw 8 =====
Thursday, October 23, 14:00

Sheet E	1	2	3	4	5	6	7	8	9	10	Final
Nigeria (Woods III) 🔨	0	0	0	0	0	0	0	X	X	X	0
Kazakhstan (Zhuzbay)	3	1	1	2	1	3	3	X	X	X	14

Sheet F	1	2	3	4	5	6	7	8	9	10	Final
Chinese Taipei (Lin)	0	1	1	3	0	2	2	X	X	X	9
Puerto Rico (Acosta) 🔨	0	0	0	0	1	0	0	X	X	X	1

Sheet G	1	2	3	4	5	6	7	8	9	10	11	Final
Hong Kong (Chang) 🔨	2	1	0	3	0	0	0	0	0	0	1	7
India (Raju)	0	0	3	0	0	0	0	1	1	1	0	6

Sheet H	1	2	3	4	5	6	7	8	9	10	Final
Brazil (Mello)	0	1	0	2	0	1	0	1	0	X	5
Guyana (Husain) 🔨	3	0	2	0	1	0	2	0	1	X	9

Sheet J	1	2	3	4	5	6	7	8	9	10	Final
Mexico (Tompkins) 🔨	0	5	1	1	1	1	X	X	X	X	9
Saudi Arabia (Masalmeh)	1	0	0	0	0	0	X	X	X	X	1

===== Draw 9 =====
Friday, October 24, 9:00

Sheet E	1	2	3	4	5	6	7	8	9	10	Final
India (Raju) 🔨	0	2	3	0	2	3	0	3	X	X	13
Thailand (Jearateetawit)	1	0	0	3	0	0	1	0	X	X	5

Sheet F	1	2	3	4	5	6	7	8	9	10	Final
Saudi Arabia (Masalmeh)	0	1	0	2	0	2	0	X	X	X	5
Guyana (Husain) 🔨	1	0	2	0	4	0	5	X	X	X	12

Sheet G	1	2	3	4	5	6	7	8	9	10	Final
Mexico (Tompkins) 🔨	0	3	0	0	0	3	3	0	2	X	11
Puerto Rico (Acosta)	3	0	1	1	2	0	0	1	0	X	8

Sheet H	1	2	3	4	5	6	7	8	9	10	Final
Hong Kong (Chang) 🔨	0	2	1	0	1	1	0	3	2	X	10
Chinese Taipei (Lin)	0	0	0	1	0	0	2	0	0	X	3

Sheet J	1	2	3	4	5	6	7	8	9	10	Final
Brazil (Mello)	0	0	0	0	0	1	1	0	X	X	2
Kazakhstan (Zhuzbay) 🔨	1	1	2	1	1	0	0	2	X	X	8

===== Draw 10 =====
Friday, October 24, 19:00

Sheet E	1	2	3	4	5	6	7	8	9	10	Final
Puerto Rico (Acosta) 🔨	0	2	2	0	0	2	0	1	1	X	8
Brazil (Mello)	2	0	0	3	1	0	4	0	0	X	10

Sheet F	1	2	3	4	5	6	7	8	9	10	Final
Kazakhstan (Zhuzbay) 🔨	0	2	1	3	0	2	0	2	X	X	10
Hong Kong (Chang)	0	0	0	0	1	0	2	0	X	X	3

Sheet G	1	2	3	4	5	6	7	8	9	10	Final
Nigeria (Woods III)	1	0	0	0	1	0	0	0	X	X	2
Guyana (Husain) 🔨	0	2	2	1	0	4	2	2	X	X	13

Sheet H	1	2	3	4	5	6	7	8	9	10	Final
Saudi Arabia (Masalmeh)	0	3	4	0	0	3	0	2	2	X	14
Thailand (Jearateetawit) 🔨	1	0	0	2	2	0	3	0	0	X	8

Sheet J	1	2	3	4	5	6	7	8	9	10	Final
Chinese Taipei (Lin) 🔨	0	0	1	0	1	1	0	0	X	X	3
India (Raju)	2	1	0	3	0	0	1	2	X	X	9

===== Draw 11 =====
Saturday, October 25, 10:00

Sheet E	1	2	3	4	5	6	7	8	9	10	Final
Chinese Taipei (Lin) 🔨	1	0	0	1	0	1	0	X	X	X	3
Mexico (Tompkins)	0	2	3	0	3	0	5	X	X	X	13

Sheet F	1	2	3	4	5	6	7	8	9	10	Final
Nigeria (Woods III)	0	2	1	0	3	2	1	0	1	0	10
Thailand (Jearateetawit) 🔨	5	0	0	2	0	0	0	3	0	1	11

Sheet G	1	2	3	4	5	6	7	8	9	10	Final
Saudi Arabia (Masalmeh)	0	1	1	0	0	1	0	0	X	X	3
Brazil (Mello) 🔨	2	0	0	1	1	0	2	3	X	X	9

Sheet H	1	2	3	4	5	6	7	8	9	10	Final
India (Raju)	3	0	0	0	1	0	5	0	0	2	11
Kazakhstan (Zhuzbay) 🔨	0	0	4	0	0	1	0	3	1	0	9

Sheet J	1	2	3	4	5	6	7	8	9	10	Final
Guyana (Husain) 🔨	2	0	1	2	0	1	0	1	0	0	7
Hong Kong (Chang)	0	0	0	0	1	0	3	0	3	1	8

==== Playoffs ====
Semifinals
1	Kazakhstan	10
4	Guyana	7
2	Hong Kong	6
3	India	5

Gold medal game
1	Kazakhstan	9
2	Hong Kong	10
Bronze medal game
4	Guyana	9
3	India	6

===== Semifinals =====
Saturday, October 25, 18:00

Sheet F	1	2	3	4	5	6	7	8	9	10	Final
Kazakhstan (Zhuzbay) 🔨	0	1	0	3	1	0	2	3	0	X	10
Guyana (Husain)	0	0	3	0	0	3	0	0	1	X	7

Sheet H	1	2	3	4	5	6	7	8	9	10	11	Final
Hong Kong (Chang) 🔨	0	0	1	0	1	1	0	0	2	0	1	6
India (Raju)	0	1	0	1	0	0	1	1	0	1	0	5

===== Bronze medal game =====
Sunday, October 26, 9:00

Sheet E	1	2	3	4	5	6	7	8	9	10	Final
Guyana (Husain)	0	0	0	2	0	2	1	2	1	1	9
India (Raju) 🔨	1	2	1	0	2	0	0	0	0	0	6

===== Gold medal game =====
Sunday, October 26, 9:00

Sheet G	1	2	3	4	5	6	7	8	9	10	11	Final
Kazakhstan (Zhuzbay) 🔨	3	0	2	0	0	1	1	0	0	2	0	9
Hong Kong (Chang)	0	3	0	3	1	0	0	1	1	0	1	10

==== Final standings ====
Place	Team
1st place, gold medalist(s)	Hong Kong
2nd place, silver medalist(s)	Kazakhstan
3rd place, bronze medalist(s)	Guyana
4	India
5	Brazil
6	Mexico
7	Chinese Taipei
8	Puerto Rico
9	Saudi Arabia
10	Thailand
11	Nigeria

== Women ==
=== A division ===
==== Qualification ====
The following nations qualified to participate in the 2025 Pan Continental Curling Championship A Division:

Event	Vacancies	Qualified
2024 Pan Continental Curling Championships A Division	7	Canada; South Korea; China; Japan; United States; New Zealand; Mexico
2024 Pan Continental Curling Championships B Division	1	Australia
TOTAL	8	

==== Teams ====
The teams are listed as follows:

Australia	Canada	China	Japan
Skip: Helen Williams; Third: Sara Westman; Second: Kristen Tsourlenes; Lead: Karen Titheridge; Alternate: Michelle Fredericks-Armstrong	Skip: Rachel Homan; Third: Tracy Fleury; Second: Emma Miskew; Lead: Sarah Wilkes; Alternate: Rachelle Brown	Skip: Wang Rui; Third: Han Yu; Second: Dong Ziqi; Lead: Jiang Jiayi; Alternate: Su Tingyu	Skip: Satsuki Fujisawa; Third: Chinami Yoshida; Second: Yumi Suzuki; Lead: Yurika Yoshida; Alternate: Yako Matsuzawa
Mexico	New Zealand	South Korea	United States
Skip: Adriana Camarena; Third: Estefano Quintero; Second: Karla Knepper; Lead: Karla Martínez; Alternate: Veronica Huerta	Skip: Bridget Becker; Third: Holly Thompson; Second: Rachael Pitts; Lead: Ruby Kinney; Alternate: Lucy Neilson	Skip: Gim Eun-ji; Third: Kim Min-ji; Second: Kim Su-ji; Lead: Seol Ye-eun; Alternate: Seol Ye-ji	Skip: Tabitha Peterson; Third: Cory Thiesse; Second: Tara Peterson; Lead: Taylor Anderson-Heide; Alternate: Aileen Geving

==== Round robin standings ====
Final Round Robin Standings

Key
Teams to Playoffs and Qualified for the 2026 World Women's Curling Championship
Team Qualified for the 2026 World Women's Curling Championship

Country	Skip	W	L	W–L	PF	PA	EW	EL	BE	SE	S%	DSC
China	Wang Rui	7	0	–	57	27	27	20	4	8	87.5%	33.90
Canada	Rachel Homan	5	2	1–0	53	35	29	20	4	8	85.2%	30.45
United States	Tabitha Peterson	5	2	0–1	51	29	30	22	9	9	85.8%	25.73
South Korea	Gim Eun-ji	4	3	1–0	55	36	30	25	5	10	84.8%	59.32
Japan	Satsuki Fujisawa	4	3	0–1	50	30	27	23	4	6	85.4%	41.78
Australia	Helen Williams	2	5	–	35	57	22	23	2	6	72.6%	52.93
New Zealand	Bridget Becker	1	6	–	27	61	20	33	3	4	70.6%	55.65
Mexico	Adriana Camarena	0	7	–	21	74	17	36	0	2	61.2%	109.64

Round Robin Summary Table
Pos.	Country	Australia	Canada	China	Japan	Mexico	New Zealand	South Korea	United States	Record
6	Australia	—	1–9	0–11	6–8	10–2	11–5	2–11	5–11	2–5
2	Canada	9–1	—	6–7	5–11	9–3	10–2	11–9	3–2	5–2
1	China	11–0	7–6	—	5–4	11–2	10–4	6–5	7–6	7–0
5	Japan	8–6	11–5	4–5	—	12–2	7–2	3–4	5–6	4–3
8	Mexico	2–10	3–9	2–11	2–12	—	7–9	2–12	3–11	0–7
7	New Zealand	5–11	2–10	4–10	2–7	9–7	—	4–9	1–7	1–6
4	South Korea	11–2	9–11	5–6	4–3	12–2	9–4	—	5–8	4–3
3	United States	11–5	2–3	6–7	6–5	11–3	7–1	8–5	—	5–2

==== Round robin results ====
All draw times are listed in Central Time (UTC−05:00).

===== Draw 1 =====
Tuesday, October 21, 9:00

Sheet A	1	2	3	4	5	6	7	8	9	10	11	Final
China (Wang) 🔨	0	1	0	0	1	1	0	2	0	0	1	6
South Korea (Gim)	0	0	0	1	0	0	1	0	2	1	0	5

Sheet B	1	2	3	4	5	6	7	8	9	10	Final
Mexico (Camarena)	0	1	0	1	0	0	1	0	X	X	3
United States (Peterson) 🔨	4	0	3	0	0	3	0	1	X	X	11

Sheet C	1	2	3	4	5	6	7	8	9	10	Final
New Zealand (Becker)	3	0	0	0	1	0	0	1	0	X	5
Australia (Williams) 🔨	0	3	2	2	0	0	2	0	2	X	11

Sheet D	1	2	3	4	5	6	7	8	9	10	Final
Canada (Homan)	0	1	0	3	0	1	0	X	X	X	5
Japan (Fujisawa) 🔨	2	0	5	0	2	0	2	X	X	X	11

===== Draw 2 =====
Tuesday, October 21, 19:00

Sheet A	1	2	3	4	5	6	7	8	9	10	Final
Australia (Williams)	0	2	0	2	0	0	1	0	1	X	6
Japan (Fujisawa) 🔨	1	0	2	0	2	1	0	2	0	X	8

Sheet B	1	2	3	4	5	6	7	8	9	10	Final
New Zealand (Becker) 🔨	0	0	0	1	0	1	X	X	X	X	2
Canada (Homan)	3	3	3	0	1	0	X	X	X	X	10

Sheet C	1	2	3	4	5	6	7	8	9	10	Final
South Korea (Gim)	1	0	1	0	0	0	2	0	1	X	5
United States (Peterson) 🔨	0	2	0	2	1	0	0	3	0	X	8

Sheet D	1	2	3	4	5	6	7	8	9	10	Final
China (Wang) 🔨	3	0	2	1	1	4	X	X	X	X	11
Mexico (Camarena)	0	2	0	0	0	0	X	X	X	X	2

===== Draw 3 =====
Wednesday, October 22, 14:00

Sheet A	1	2	3	4	5	6	7	8	9	10	Final
New Zealand (Becker)	0	0	0	0	0	0	1	X	X	X	1
United States (Peterson) 🔨	1	1	1	0	3	1	0	X	X	X	7

Sheet B	1	2	3	4	5	6	7	8	9	10	Final
China (Wang)	0	0	0	0	1	1	0	1	0	2	5
Japan (Fujisawa) 🔨	0	1	0	0	0	0	2	0	1	0	4

Sheet C	1	2	3	4	5	6	7	8	9	10	Final
Canada (Homan) 🔨	3	0	1	0	3	0	1	1	X	X	9
Mexico (Camarena)	0	1	0	1	0	1	0	0	X	X	3

Sheet D	1	2	3	4	5	6	7	8	9	10	Final
South Korea (Gim)	1	0	4	0	3	3	X	X	X	X	11
Australia (Williams) 🔨	0	1	0	1	0	0	X	X	X	X	2

===== Draw 4 =====
Thursday, October 23, 9:00

Sheet A	1	2	3	4	5	6	7	8	9	10	Final
Mexico (Camarena)	0	0	1	0	0	0	1	0	0	X	2
Australia (Williams) 🔨	0	4	0	2	1	1	0	1	1	X	10

Sheet B	1	2	3	4	5	6	7	8	9	10	Final
Canada (Homan) 🔨	1	0	2	0	2	2	0	3	1	0	11
South Korea (Gim)	0	4	0	1	0	0	3	0	0	1	9

Sheet C	1	2	3	4	5	6	7	8	9	10	Final
China (Wang) 🔨	3	0	2	1	2	0	0	2	X	X	10
New Zealand (Becker)	0	2	0	0	0	1	1	0	X	X	4

Sheet D	1	2	3	4	5	6	7	8	9	10	Final
Japan (Fujisawa)	0	0	2	0	0	2	0	0	1	0	5
United States (Peterson) 🔨	0	1	0	0	1	0	1	1	0	2	6

===== Draw 5 =====
Thursday, October 23, 19:00

Sheet A	1	2	3	4	5	6	7	8	9	10	Final
Canada (Homan) 🔨	0	2	0	2	0	1	0	1	0	0	6
China (Wang)	0	0	1	0	2	0	2	0	0	2	7

Sheet B	1	2	3	4	5	6	7	8	9	10	Final
United States (Peterson) 🔨	1	0	1	0	0	3	2	0	4	X	11
Australia (Williams)	0	2	0	1	1	0	0	1	0	X	5

Sheet C	1	2	3	4	5	6	7	8	9	10	Final
Mexico (Camarena)	1	0	0	0	0	1	0	X	X	X	2
Japan (Fujisawa) 🔨	0	3	2	2	2	0	3	X	X	X	12

Sheet D	1	2	3	4	5	6	7	8	9	10	Final
New Zealand (Becker) 🔨	0	0	1	0	0	2	0	1	0	X	4
South Korea (Gim)	1	2	0	2	1	0	1	0	2	X	9

===== Draw 6 =====
Friday, October 24, 14:00

Sheet A	1	2	3	4	5	6	7	8	9	10	Final
South Korea (Gim) 🔨	2	0	1	0	0	3	1	5	X	X	12
Mexico (Camarena)	0	1	0	1	0	0	0	0	X	X	2

Sheet B	1	2	3	4	5	6	7	8	9	10	Final
Japan (Fujisawa) 🔨	0	3	0	2	1	0	0	0	1	X	7
New Zealand (Becker)	0	0	1	0	0	0	0	1	0	X	2

Sheet C	1	2	3	4	5	6	7	8	9	10	11	Final
United States (Peterson) 🔨	0	0	0	2	1	0	1	0	1	1	0	6
China (Wang)	0	0	1	0	0	2	0	3	0	0	1	7

Sheet D	1	2	3	4	5	6	7	8	9	10	Final
Australia (Williams)	0	0	0	1	0	0	X	X	X	X	1
Canada (Homan) 🔨	0	2	1	0	5	1	X	X	X	X	9

===== Draw 7 =====
Saturday, October 25, 9:00

Sheet A	1	2	3	4	5	6	7	8	9	10	11	Final
United States (Peterson)	0	0	0	0	1	0	0	0	0	1	0	2
Canada (Homan) 🔨	0	0	1	0	0	1	0	0	0	0	1	3

Sheet B	1	2	3	4	5	6	7	8	9	10	Final
Australia (Williams)	0	0	0	0	0	0	X	X	X	X	0
China (Wang) 🔨	0	1	2	2	4	2	X	X	X	X	11

Sheet C	1	2	3	4	5	6	7	8	9	10	Final
Japan (Fujisawa)	0	0	0	0	1	0	0	0	1	1	3
South Korea (Gim) 🔨	1	0	0	1	0	0	0	2	0	0	4

Sheet D	1	2	3	4	5	6	7	8	9	10	Final
Mexico (Camarena)	0	1	3	0	0	1	0	2	0	0	7
New Zealand (Becker) 🔨	2	0	0	2	1	0	1	0	2	1	9

==== Playoffs ====
Semifinals
1	China	6
4	South Korea	5
2	Canada	8
3	United States	3

Gold medal game
1	China	7
2	Canada	6
Bronze medal game
4	South Korea	11
3	United States	8

===== Semifinals =====
Saturday, October 25, 19:00

Sheet A	1	2	3	4	5	6	7	8	9	10	11	Final
China (Wang) 🔨	0	2	0	0	1	0	0	1	1	0	1	6
South Korea (Gim)	0	0	2	0	0	2	0	0	0	1	0	5

Player percentages
China		South Korea	
Jiang Jiayi	89%	Seol Ye-eun	89%
Dong Ziqi	81%	Kim Su-ji	85%
Han Yu	82%	Kim Min-ji	85%
Wang Rui	83%	Gim Eun-ji	90%
Total	84%	Total	87%

Sheet D	1	2	3	4	5	6	7	8	9	10	Final
Canada (Homan) 🔨	0	2	0	1	1	1	0	3	X	X	8
United States (Peterson)	0	0	1	0	0	0	2	0	X	X	3

Player percentages
Canada		United States	
Sarah Wilkes	89%	Taylor Anderson-Heide	89%
Emma Miskew	94%	Tara Peterson	84%
Tracy Fleury	80%	Cory Thiesse	92%
Rachel Homan	86%	Tabitha Peterson	77%
Total	87%	Total	86%

===== Bronze medal game =====
Sunday, October 26, 8:30

Sheet C	1	2	3	4	5	6	7	8	9	10	11	Final
South Korea (Gim)	0	0	1	0	2	0	4	0	1	0	3	11
United States (Peterson) 🔨	1	1	0	3	0	1	0	1	0	1	0	8

Player percentages
South Korea		United States	
Seol Ye-eun	91%	Taylor Anderson-Heide	98%
Kim Su-ji	90%	Tara Peterson	93%
Kim Min-ji	95%	Cory Thiesse	88%
Gim Eun-ji	90%	Tabitha Peterson	75%
Total	91%	Total	88%

===== Gold medal game =====
Sunday, October 26, 16:30

Sheet B	1	2	3	4	5	6	7	8	9	10	Final
China (Wang) 🔨	1	0	1	0	0	2	1	0	2	0	7
Canada (Homan)	0	2	0	1	0	0	0	1	0	2	6

Player percentages
China		Canada	
Jiang Jiayi	78%	Sarah Wilkes	92%
Dong Ziqi	90%	Emma Miskew	88%
Han Yu	79%	Tracy Fleury	80%
Wang Rui	92%	Rachel Homan	71%
Total	84%	Total	83%

==== Player percentages ====
Round robin only

Leads	%
(China) Jiang Jiayi	91.9
(United States) Taylor Anderson-Heide	89.7
(South Korea) Seol Ye-eun	88.2
(Canada) Sarah Wilkes	86.0
(Japan) Yurika Yoshida	84.8

Seconds	%
(China) Dong Ziqi	90.0
(Japan) Yumi Suzuki	87.5
(United States) Tara Peterson	86.5
(Canada) Emma Miskew	85.6
(South Korea) Kim Su-ji	83.9

Thirds	%
(South Korea) Kim Min-ji	87.2
(Japan) Chinami Yoshida	85.7
(United States) Cory Thiesse	84.4
(Canada) Tracy Fleury	83.6
(China) Han Yu	83.5

Skips	%
(China) Wang Rui	85.6
(Canada) Rachel Homan	83.5
(Japan) Satsuki Fujisawa	83.1
(United States) Tabitha Peterson	82.3
(South Korea) Gim Eun-ji	79.3

==== Final standings ====
Key
Teams Advance to the 2026 World Women's Curling Championship

Place	Team
1st place, gold medalist(s)	China
2nd place, silver medalist(s)	Canada
3rd place, bronze medalist(s)	South Korea
4	United States
5	Japan
6	Australia
7	New Zealand
8	Mexico

=== B division ===
==== Teams ====
The teams are listed as follows:

Brazil	Chinese Taipei	Hong Kong	Kazakhstan
Skip: Julia Gentile; Third: Luciana Barrella; Second: Sarah Lippi; Lead: Marcelia Melo; Alternate: Gabriela Rogic Farias	Skip: Lee Ming-cheih; Third: Chang Chia-chi; Second: Wang Yu-yuen; Lead: Ou Jing; Alternate: Chen Szu-han	Skip: Ling-Yue Hung; Third: Ada Shang; Second: Pianpian Hu; Lead: Ka Chan; Alternate: Helen Li	Fourth: Merey Tastemir; Skip: Angelina Ebauyer; Second: Tilsimay Alliyarova; Lead: Angelina Penyaeva; Alternate: Kristina Rakhmanova
Philippines	Puerto Rico	Thailand	
Skip: Katie Dubberstein; Third: Leilani Dubberstein; Second: Jessica Byers; Lead: Lindsey Schmalz	Skip: Emily Pinnelli; Third: Courtney Slata; Second: Rachel Conley; Lead: Linda Crank; Alternate: Che Smith	Skip: Phichayathida Jaosap; Third: Supakan Kaewmorakot; Second: Wanwisa Puyaneramitdee; Lead: Kanya Natchanarong; Alternate: Nattida Kumpeerakit	

==== Round robin standings ====
Final Round Robin Standings

Key
Teams to Playoffs

Country	Skip	W	L	W–L	DSC
Philippines	Katie Dubberstein	6	0	–	35.650
Kazakhstan	Angelina Ebauyer	4	2	1–0	56.580
Puerto Rico	Emily Pinnelli	4	2	0–1	123.220
Hong Kong	Ling-Yue Hung	3	3	–	56.640
Brazil	Julia Gentile	2	4	–	97.970
Chinese Taipei	Lee Ming-cheih	1	5	1–0	82.830
Thailand	Phichayathida Jaosap	1	5	0–1	148.420

Round Robin Summary Table
Pos.	Country	Brazil	Chinese Taipei	Hong Kong	Kazakhstan	Philippines	Puerto Rico	Thailand	Record
5	Brazil	—	8–2	2–10	11–8	5–13	5–10	8–9	2–4
6	Chinese Taipei	2–8	—	3–9	0–16	5–12	4–13	13–9	1–5
4	Hong Kong	10–2	9–3	—	6–7	3–11	8–11	9–7	3–3
2	Kazakhstan	8–11	16–0	7–6	—	6–8	9–3	10–7	4–2
1	Philippines	13–5	12–5	11–3	8–6	—	8–6	12–1	6–0
3	Puerto Rico	10–5	13–4	11–8	3–9	6–8	—	8–7	4–2
7	Thailand	9–8	9–13	7–9	7–10	1–12	7–8	—	1–5

==== Round robin results ====
All draw times are listed in Central Time (UTC−05:00).

===== Draw 1 =====
Sunday, October 19, 14:00

Sheet G	1	2	3	4	5	6	7	8	9	10	Final
Chinese Taipei (Lee)	0	0	0	0	0	0	X	X	X	X	0
Kazakhstan (Ebauyer) 🔨	1	3	3	3	4	2	X	X	X	X	16

Sheet H	1	2	3	4	5	6	7	8	9	10	Final
Philippines (Dubberstein) 🔨	2	0	0	1	3	0	3	4	X	X	13
Brazil (Gentile)	0	1	1	0	0	3	0	0	X	X	5

Sheet J	1	2	3	4	5	6	7	8	9	10	Final
Puerto Rico (Pinnelli) 🔨	1	1	2	2	0	2	0	0	0	0	8
Thailand (Jaosap)	0	0	0	0	3	0	1	1	0	2	7

===== Draw 2 =====
Monday, October 20, 14:00

Sheet F	1	2	3	4	5	6	7	8	9	10	Final
Brazil (Gentile)	3	1	2	0	2	0	X	X	X	X	8
Chinese Taipei (Lee) 🔨	0	0	0	1	0	1	X	X	X	X	2

Sheet G	1	2	3	4	5	6	7	8	9	10	Final
Puerto Rico (Pinnelli)	1	0	1	1	0	2	0	1	0	X	6
Philippines (Dubberstein) 🔨	0	3	0	0	1	0	2	0	2	X	8

Sheet H	1	2	3	4	5	6	7	8	9	10	Final
Thailand (Jaosap)	0	0	0	0	2	0	3	1	1	X	7
Hong Kong (Hung) 🔨	2	1	1	3	0	2	0	0	0	X	9

===== Draw 3 =====
Tuesday, October 21, 14:00

Sheet F	1	2	3	4	5	6	7	8	9	10	Final
Philippines (Dubberstein) 🔨	4	0	2	0	1	0	0	0	1	X	8
Kazakhstan (Ebauyer)	0	2	0	2	0	0	0	2	0	X	6

Sheet H	1	2	3	4	5	6	7	8	9	10	Final
Puerto Rico (Pinnelli) 🔨	2	2	3	3	0	0	0	0	3	X	13
Chinese Taipei (Lee)	0	0	0	0	2	1	1	0	0	X	4

Sheet J	1	2	3	4	5	6	7	8	9	10	Final
Hong Kong (Hung) 🔨	0	2	2	2	3	0	1	X	X	X	10
Brazil (Gentile)	1	0	0	0	0	1	0	X	X	X	2

===== Draw 4 =====
Wednesday, October 22, 14:00

Sheet F	1	2	3	4	5	6	7	8	9	10	11	Final
Hong Kong (Hung) 🔨	1	3	0	0	1	0	0	0	3	0	0	8
Puerto Rico (Pinnelli)	0	0	1	2	0	1	2	1	0	1	3	11

Sheet G	1	2	3	4	5	6	7	8	9	10	Final
Thailand (Jaosap)	0	3	0	0	5	0	0	1	0	0	9
Chinese Taipei (Lee) 🔨	1	0	4	1	0	3	1	0	1	2	13

Sheet J	1	2	3	4	5	6	7	8	9	10	Final
Brazil (Gentile) 🔨	2	0	2	2	1	1	0	0	2	1	11
Kazakhstan (Ebauyer)	0	6	0	0	0	0	1	1	0	0	8

===== Draw 5 =====
Thursday, October 23, 9:00

Sheet F	1	2	3	4	5	6	7	8	9	10	Final
Kazakhstan (Ebauyer) 🔨	1	0	2	2	0	0	2	0	3	X	10
Thailand (Jaosap)	0	1	0	0	1	1	0	4	0	X	7

Sheet G	1	2	3	4	5	6	7	8	9	10	Final
Brazil (Gentile) 🔨	0	2	0	2	1	0	0	0	0	X	5
Puerto Rico (Pinnelli)	1	0	3	0	0	3	1	1	1	X	10

Sheet H	1	2	3	4	5	6	7	8	9	10	Final
Hong Kong (Hung)	0	1	0	0	2	0	0	0	X	X	3
Philippines (Dubberstein) 🔨	0	0	2	3	0	2	2	2	X	X	11

===== Draw 6 =====
Thursday, October 23, 19:00

Sheet F	1	2	3	4	5	6	7	8	9	10	Final
Chinese Taipei (Lee) 🔨	1	0	0	0	0	0	2	0	0	X	3
Hong Kong (Hung)	0	2	2	1	1	1	0	1	1	X	9

Sheet G	1	2	3	4	5	6	7	8	9	10	Final
Philippines (Dubberstein) 🔨	4	3	2	1	0	2	X	X	X	X	12
Thailand (Jaosap)	0	0	0	0	1	0	X	X	X	X	1

Sheet H	1	2	3	4	5	6	7	8	9	10	Final
Kazakhstan (Ebauyer) 🔨	1	0	0	3	0	2	0	3	X	X	9
Puerto Rico (Pinnelli)	0	0	1	0	1	0	1	0	X	X	3

===== Draw 7 =====
Friday, October 24, 14:00

Sheet F	1	2	3	4	5	6	7	8	9	10	Final
Thailand (Jaosap) 🔨	0	1	1	0	3	0	0	2	1	1	9
Brazil (Gentile)	3	0	0	1	0	2	2	0	0	0	8

Sheet G	1	2	3	4	5	6	7	8	9	10	Final
Kazakhstan (Ebauyer)	0	0	0	3	1	0	1	0	0	2	7
Hong Kong (Hung) 🔨	1	1	0	0	0	1	0	2	1	0	6

Sheet J	1	2	3	4	5	6	7	8	9	10	Final
Chinese Taipei (Lee)	0	0	1	2	1	0	0	1	0	X	5
Philippines (Dubberstein) 🔨	3	2	0	0	0	3	2	0	2	X	12

==== Playoffs ====
Semifinals
1	Philippines	10
4	Hong Kong	6
2	Kazakhstan	11
3	Puerto Rico	4

Gold medal game
1	Philippines	11
2	Kazakhstan	2
Bronze medal game
4	Hong Kong	11
3	Puerto Rico	3

===== Semifinals =====
Saturday, October 25, 18:00

Sheet G	1	2	3	4	5	6	7	8	9	10	Final
Philippines (Dubberstein) 🔨	3	0	3	0	0	3	1	0	X	X	10
Hong Kong (Hung)	0	1	0	2	1	0	0	2	X	X	6

Sheet J	1	2	3	4	5	6	7	8	9	10	Final
Kazakhstan (Ebauyer) 🔨	1	1	0	2	0	1	1	1	4	X	11
Puerto Rico (Pinnelli)	0	0	2	0	2	0	0	0	0	X	4

===== Bronze medal game =====
Sunday, October 26, 9:00

Sheet J	1	2	3	4	5	6	7	8	9	10	Final
Hong Kong (Hung)	0	1	0	3	2	0	2	1	2	X	11
Puerto Rico (Pinnelli) 🔨	1	0	1	0	0	1	0	0	0	X	3

===== Gold medal game =====
Sunday, October 26, 9:00

Sheet F	1	2	3	4	5	6	7	8	9	10	Final
Philippines (Dubberstein) 🔨	2	2	1	0	2	1	1	2	X	X	11
Kazakhstan (Ebauyer)	0	0	0	2	0	0	0	0	X	X	2

==== Final standings ====
Place	Team
1st place, gold medalist(s)	Philippines
2nd place, silver medalist(s)	Kazakhstan
3rd place, bronze medalist(s)	Hong Kong
4	Puerto Rico
5	Brazil
6	Chinese Taipei
7	Thailand
