= Li Zhichao (curler) =

Chinese curler (born 2001)

- Curler
- Born: 27 November 2001 (age 24); Bayannur, Inner Mongolia, China

Team
- Skip: Xu Xiaoming
- Third: Fei Xueqing
- Second: Li Zhichao
- Lead: Xu Jingtao
- Alternate: Wang Zhenhao

Curling career
- Member Association: China
- World Championship: 2 (2025, 2026)
- Pan Continental Championship: 2 (2024, 2025)
- Olympic: 1 (2026)
- Other appearances: Asian Winter Games: 1 (2025)
Medal record
Men's curling
Representing China
Asian Winter Games
Bronze medal – third place	2025 Harbin	Men's
Pan Continental Championships
Gold medal – first place	2024 Lacombe
World Junior Championships
Gold medal – first place	2023 Füssen

Li Zhichao (Chinese: 李智超; pinyin: Lǐ Zhìchāo; born 27 November 2001 in Bayannur, Inner Mongolia) is a Chinese curler. He currently plays second on the Chinese men's curling team skipped by Xu Xiaoming.

At the 2025 World Men's Curling Championship, Li caused controversy when he was caught allegedly cheating in their quarterfinal game against Norway. On a stone delivered by China skip Xu Xiaoming, Li was seen to have "swung his brush handle" against the rock, altering its trajectory, just before it was about to hit a guard, causing the rock to "jump". After a technical timeout, the Norwegian team decided to let the matter go, and did not file a complaint.

== Teams and events ==
Season	Skip	Third	Second	Lead	Alternate	Coach	Events
2019–20	Ma Jiahong	Li Menghua	Xiang Zehao	Li Zhichao		Guo Wenli	
2022–23	Fei Xueqing	Guan Tianqui	Li Zhichao	Xie Xingyin	Ye Jianjun	Xu Xiaoming	WJCC 2023 (gold)
2023–24	Fei Xueqing	Guan Tianqui	Li Zhichao	Xie Xingyin	Ye Jianjun	Xu Xiaoming	
2023–24	Ma Xiuyue	Zou Qiang	Wang Zhiyu	Tian Jiafeng	Li Zhichao	Liu Rui	PCC 2023 (9th)
2024–25	Fei Xueqing	Tian Yu	Li Zhichao	Ye Jianjun		Xu Xiaoming	
2024–25	Xu Xiaoming	Fei Xueqing	Wang Zhiyu	Li Zhichao	Ye Jianjun	Tan Weidong, Zhou Yan	WAG 2025 (bronze)
2024–25	Xu Xiaoming	Fei Xueqing	Wang Zhiyu	Li Zhichao	Ye Jianjun (PCCC), Yang Bohao (WMCC)	Tan Weidong	PCCC 2024 (gold); WMCC 2025 (4th)
2025–26	Xu Xiaoming	Fei Xueqing	Li Zhichao	Xu Jingtao	Wang Zhenhao		

== Personal life ==
He started curling in 2016 at the age of 15.
