= Jiang Jiayi =

Chinese curler (born 2001)

- Curler
- Born: March 20, 2001 (age 25); Beijing, China

Team
- Curling club: CSO CC, Beijing
- Skip: Wang Rui
- Third: Han Yu
- Second: Dong Ziqi
- Lead: Jiang Jiayi
- Alternate: Su Tingyu

Curling career
- Member Association: China
- World Championship: 2 (2025, 2026)
- Pan Continental Championship: 2 (2024, 2025)
- World Junior Curling Championship: 1 (2019)
- Olympic: 1 (2026)
- Other appearances: Winter Universiade: 1 (2023), Asian Winter Games: 1 (2025)
Medal record
Curling
Representing China
World Championship
Bronze medal – third place	2025 Uijeongbu
Pan Continental Championships
Gold medal – first place	2025 Virginia
Bronze medal – third place	2024 Lacombe
Asian Winter Games
Silver medal – second place	2025 Harbin
Winter Universiade
Gold medal – first place	2023 Lake Placid

Jiang Jiayi (Chinese: 姜嘉怡; pinyin: Jiang Jiayi, born March 20, 2001 in Beijing) is a Chinese curler.

== Career ==
=== Juniors ===
Jiang was the skip of the Chinese national women's junior team at the 2019 World Junior Curling Championships alongside Han Yu, Zhao Ruiyi, and Shang Yining, where they would go 8–1 in the round robin. In the playoffs, they lost the semi-final to Russia's Vlada Rumiantseva, and then to Switzerland's Raphaela Keiser in the bronze medal game to finish 4th.

Jiang would then return to international curling at the 2023 World University Games in Lake Placid, where she would now be the lead of the Chinese team, alongside former teammate Han as well as Dong Ziqi, and Zhu Zihui. At the University Games, China would finish the robin with a 7–2 record, and would go on to beat the United States' Delaney Strouse in the semifinal and then South Korea's Ha Seung-youn 6–4 in the final to win the gold medal. This would be China's first gold medal at the University Games since Wang Bingyu in 2009.

=== Women's ===
Jiang would join the Chinese national women's team as lead, alongside skip Wang Rui, and former junior teammates Han and Dong. They would compete at the 2024 Pan Continental Curling Championships, where the team would win a bronze medal, qualifying them to return for the 2025 World Women's Curling Championship. In preparation for the World Championships, Wang and her rink would also represent China at the 2025 Asian Winter Games, where they would go on to win a silver medal, losing to South Korea's Gim Eun-ji 7–2 in the final. At the 2025 Worlds, the team finished the round robin with a 7–5 record, and would go on to win a bronze medal, this time beating Gim 9–4 in the bronze medal game. This bronze medal performance also qualified the Chinese women's team for the 2026 Winter Olympics.

During the 2025–26 season, Team Wang would participate in their first Grand Slam of Curling event at the 2025 Masters. At the event, Wang would finish with a 1–3 record. The team would then go on to represent China at the 2025 Pan Continental Curling Championships, where they would have an impressive week, going undefeated in the tournament and beating Canada's Rachel Homan 7–6 in the final.

== Teams ==
=== Women's ===
Season	Skip	Third	Second	Lead	Alternate	Coach	Events
2018–19	Han Yu (fourth)	Jiang Jiayi (skip)	Zhao Ruiyi	Shang Yining	Ding Yuexin	Perry Marshall	WJCC 2019 (4th)
2022–23	Han Yu	Dong Ziqi	Zhu Zihui	Jiang Jiayi	Ren Haining	Yu Zuojun	WUG 2023 (gold)
2024–25	Wang Rui	Han Yu	Dong Ziqi	Jiang Jiayi	Su Tingyu	Zang Jialiang	PCCC 2024 (bronze); AWG 2025 (silver); WWCC 2025 (bronze); PCCC 2025 (gold)

== Personal life ==
Jiang Jiayi attended Beijing Sport University.
