= Fei Xueqing =

Chinese curler (born 2002)

- Curler
- Born: 4 May 2002 (age 24); Liupanshui City, Guizhou, China

Team
- Skip: Xu Xiaoming
- Third: Fei Xueqing
- Second: Li Zhichao
- Lead: Xu Jingtao
- Alternate: Wang Zhenhao

Curling career
- Member Association: China
- World Championship: 2 (2025, 2026)
- Pan Continental Championship: 2 (2024, 2025)
- Olympic: 1 (2026)
- Other appearances: Asian Winter Games: 1 (2025)
Medal record
Men's curling
Representing China
Asian Winter Games
Bronze medal – third place	2025 Harbin	Men's
Pan Continental Championships
Gold medal – first place	2024 Lacombe
World Junior Championships
Gold medal – first place	2023 Füssen

Fei Xueqing (Chinese: 费学清; pinyin: Fèi Xuéqīng; born 4 May 2002 in Liupanshui City, Guizhou) is a Chinese curler. He currently plays third on the Chinese men's curling team skipped by Xu Xiaoming.

== Teams and events ==
Season	Skip	Third	Second	Lead	Alternate	Coach	Events
2022–23	Fei Xueqing	Guan Tianqui	Li Zhichao	Xie Xingyin	Ye Jianjun	Xu Xiaoming	WJCC 2023 (gold)
2023–24	Fei Xueqing	Guan Tianqui	Li Zhichao	Xie Xingyin	Ye Jianjun	Xu Xiaoming	
2024–25	Fei Xueqing	Tian Yu	Li Zhichao	Ye Jianjun		Xu Xiaoming	
2024–25	Xu Xiaoming	Fei Xueqing	Wang Zhiyu	Li Zhichao	Ye Jianjun	Tan Weidong, Zhou Yan	WAG 2025 (bronze)
2024–25	Xu Xiaoming	Fei Xueqing	Wang Zhiyu	Li Zhichao	Ye Jianjun (PCCC), Yang Bohao (WMCC)	Tan Weidong	PCCC 2024 (gold); WMCC 2025 (4th)
2025–26	Xu Xiaoming	Fei Xueqing	Li Zhichao	Xu Jingtao	Wang Zhenhao		

== Personal life ==
He started curling in 2016 at the age of 15.
