= 2023 World Junior Curling Championships =

- Host city: Füssen, Germany
- Arena: National Training Centre for Ice Hockey and Curling
- Dates: February 25 – March 4
- Men's winner: China
- Skip: Fei Xueqing
- Third: Guan Tianqui
- Second: Li Zhichao
- Lead: Xie Xingyin
- Alternate: Ye Jianjun
- Coach: Xu Xiaoming
- Finalist: Germany (Kapp)
- Women's winner: Scotland
- Skip: Fay Henderson
- Third: Robyn Munro
- Second: Holly Wilkie-Milne
- Lead: Laura Watt
- Alternate: Amy Mitchell
- Coach: Colin Morrison
- Finalist: Japan (Miura)

The 2023 World Junior Curling Championships were held from February 25 to March 4 at the National Training Centre for Ice Hockey and Curling in Füssen, Germany.

== Men ==
=== Qualification ===
The following nations qualified to participate in the 2023 World Junior Curling Championship:

Event	Vacancies	Qualified
Host Nation	1	Germany
2022 World Junior Curling Championships	6	Scotland; Canada; Norway; Switzerland; United States; South Korea
2022 World Junior-B Curling Championships (December)	3	China; Italy; Turkey
TOTAL	10	

=== Teams ===
The teams are listed as follows:

Canada	China	Germany	Italy	Norway
Skip: Landan Rooney; Third: Scott Mitchell; Second: Jacob Jones; Lead: Austin Snyder; Alternate: Connor Deane	Skip: Fei Xueqing; Third: Guan Tianqi; Second: Li Zhichao; Lead: Xie Xingyin; Alternate: Ye Jianjun	Skip: Benjamin Kapp; Third: Felix Messenzehl; Second: Johannes Scheuerl; Lead: Mario Trevisiol; Alternate: Adrian Enders	Skip: Giacomo Colli; Third: Francesco de Zanna; Second: Simone Piffer; Lead: Stefano Gilli; Alternate: Francesco Vigliani	Fourth: Grunde Buraas; Skip: Lukas Høstmælingen; Second: Magnus Lillebø; Lead: Tinius Haslev Nordbye; Alternate: Sander Moen
Scotland	South Korea	Switzerland	Turkey	United States
Skip: Orrin Carson; Third: Logan Carson; Second: Archie Hyslop; Lead: Charlie Gibb; Alternate: Scott Hyslop	Skip: Kim Eun-bin; Third: Kim Hyo-jun; Second: Pyo Jeong-min; Lead: Kim Jun-hun	Fourth: Philipp Hösli; Skip: Jan Iseli; Second: Maximilian Winz; Lead: Sandro Fanchini; Alternate: Andreas Gerlach	Skip: Serkan Karagöz; Third: Selahattin Eser; Second: Mehmet Bayramoğlu; Lead: Bilal Nerse; Alternate: Muhammed Zenit	Skip: Ethan Sampson; Third: Kevin Tuma; Second: Coleman Thurston; Lead: Marius Kleinas; Alternate: Jake Zeman

=== Round robin standings ===
Final Round Robin Standings

Key
Teams to Playoffs
Teams relegated to 2023 "B" Championship

Country	Skip	W	L	W–L	PF	PA	EW	EL	BE	SE	DSC
Germany	Benjamin Kapp	7	2	1–0	69	41	37	32	10	8	21.06
Scotland	Orrin Carson	7	2	0–1	62	41	38	29	4	11	34.53
China	Fei Xueqing	6	3	–	63	50	36	35	10	10	23.76
Norway	Lukas Høstmælingen	5	4	2–0	58	64	39	31	4	9	40.03
Italy	Giacomo Colli	5	4	1–1	52	49	31	35	10	9	37.19
Switzerland	Jan Iseli	5	4	0–2	63	51	41	33	9	10	42.65
United States	Ethan Sampson	4	5	–	55	60	35	34	3	8	39.83
Canada	Landan Rooney	3	6	–	57	62	33	34	4	11	39.18
South Korea	Kim Eun-bin	2	7	–	52	69	30	42	6	3	41.99
Turkey	Serkan Karagöz	1	8	–	37	81	27	40	3	3	48.63

Round Robin Summary Table
Pos.	Country	Canada	China	Germany	Italy	Norway	Scotland	South Korea	Switzerland	Turkey	United States	Record
8	Canada	—N/a	6–9	2–8	4–8	9–3	2–7	6–8	8–11	9–3	11–5	3–6
3	China	9–6	—N/a	4–3	7–6	7–6	9–3	11–3	5–8	6–9	5–6	6–3
1	Germany	8–2	3–4	—N/a	3–4	13–5	8–5	7–6	8–6	11–4	8–5	7–2
5	Italy	8–4	6–7	4–3	—N/a	5–6	3–10	12–5	4–3	7–4	3–7	5–4
4	Norway	3–9	6–7	5–13	6–5	—N/a	5–8	6–3	8–6	9–5	10–8	5–4
2	Scotland	7–2	3–9	5–8	10–3	8–5	—N/a	7–6	8–3	8–3	6–2	7–2
9	South Korea	8–6	3–11	6–7	5–12	3–6	6–7	—N/a	5–9	11–3	5–8	2–7
6	Switzerland	11–8	8–5	6–8	3–4	6–8	3–8	9–5	—N/a	9–2	8–3	5–4
10	Turkey	3–9	9–6	4–11	4–7	5–9	3–8	3–11	2–9	—N/a	4–11	1–8
7	United States	5–11	6–5	5–8	7–3	8–10	2–6	8–5	3–8	11–4	—N/a	4–5

=== Round robin results ===
==== Draw 1 ====
Saturday, February 25, 14:00

Sheet A	1	2	3	4	5	6	7	8	9	10	Final
Canada (Rooney)	0	0	1	0	1	0	0	0	0	X	2
Scotland (Carson) 🔨	0	2	0	1	0	1	0	2	1	X	7

Sheet B	1	2	3	4	5	6	7	8	9	10	Final
Germany (Kapp) 🔨	0	2	0	3	0	4	0	4	X	X	13
Norway (Høstmælingen)	0	0	2	0	2	0	1	0	X	X	5

Sheet C	1	2	3	4	5	6	7	8	9	10	Final
United States (Sampson) 🔨	1	0	2	0	1	0	2	0	1	1	8
South Korea (Kim)	0	0	0	1	0	2	0	2	0	0	5

Sheet D	1	2	3	4	5	6	7	8	9	10	Final
Italy (Colli)	1	2	0	1	0	1	0	0	0	2	7
Turkey (Karagöz) 🔨	0	0	1	0	1	0	1	1	0	0	4

Sheet E	1	2	3	4	5	6	7	8	9	10	Final
China (Fei)	0	0	0	0	2	0	1	0	2	0	5
Switzerland (Iseli) 🔨	0	1	2	1	0	2	0	1	0	1	8

==== Draw 2 ====
Sunday, February 26, 9:00

Sheet A	1	2	3	4	5	6	7	8	9	10	11	12	Final
Norway (Høstmælingen) 🔨	0	1	0	0	0	1	1	0	2	0	0	1	6
Italy (Colli)	0	0	1	1	0	0	0	2	0	1	0	0	5

Sheet B	1	2	3	4	5	6	7	8	9	10	Final
Scotland (Carson)	0	0	2	1	1	1	1	0	2	X	8
Turkey (Karagöz) 🔨	0	1	0	0	0	0	0	2	0	X	3

Sheet C	1	2	3	4	5	6	7	8	9	10	Final
China (Fei) 🔨	0	3	2	0	2	0	0	0	1	1	9
Canada (Rooney)	0	0	0	2	0	3	0	1	0	0	6

Sheet D	1	2	3	4	5	6	7	8	9	10	Final
Switzerland (Iseli) 🔨	2	0	1	1	0	2	0	2	0	1	9
South Korea (Kim)	0	1	0	0	1	0	2	0	1	0	5

Sheet E	1	2	3	4	5	6	7	8	9	10	Final
Germany (Kapp) 🔨	0	4	0	0	3	0	0	1	0	X	8
United States (Sampson)	0	0	1	1	0	2	0	0	1	X	5

==== Draw 3 ====
Sunday, February 26, 19:00

Sheet A	1	2	3	4	5	6	7	8	9	10	Final
South Korea (Kim)	0	2	0	1	0	0	0	0	3	0	6
Germany (Kapp) 🔨	1	0	1	0	0	0	2	2	0	1	7

Sheet B	1	2	3	4	5	6	7	8	9	10	11	Final
Canada (Rooney)	0	2	1	0	0	1	0	2	0	2	0	8
Switzerland (Iseli) 🔨	0	0	0	2	1	0	3	0	2	0	3	11

Sheet C	1	2	3	4	5	6	7	8	9	10	Final
Scotland (Carson) 🔨	1	1	4	0	4	0	X	X	X	X	10
Italy (Colli)	0	0	0	2	0	1	X	X	X	X	3

Sheet D	1	2	3	4	5	6	7	8	9	10	11	Final
United States (Sampson)	0	1	0	1	0	1	1	1	0	0	1	6
China (Fei) 🔨	0	0	2	0	1	0	0	0	1	1	0	5

Sheet E	1	2	3	4	5	6	7	8	9	10	Final
Norway (Høstmælingen)	0	0	1	1	0	3	2	0	2	X	9
Turkey (Karagöz) 🔨	0	3	0	0	1	1	0	0	0	X	5

==== Draw 4 ====
Monday, February 27, 14:00

Sheet A	1	2	3	4	5	6	7	8	9	10	Final
Turkey (Karagöz) 🔨	0	4	0	2	0	1	0	1	1	X	9
China (Fei)	0	0	3	0	2	0	1	0	0	X	6

Sheet B	1	2	3	4	5	6	7	8	9	10	Final
United States (Sampson) 🔨	1	0	0	2	0	0	0	0	4	X	7
Italy (Colli)	0	1	0	0	0	0	0	2	0	X	3

Sheet C	1	2	3	4	5	6	7	8	9	10	Final
Switzerland (Iseli) 🔨	1	2	0	0	0	0	1	0	2	X	6
Norway (Høstmælingen)	0	0	2	1	1	1	0	3	0	X	8

Sheet D	1	2	3	4	5	6	7	8	9	10	Final
South Korea (Kim) 🔨	0	0	0	3	0	0	1	2	0	2	8
Canada (Rooney)	0	1	1	0	1	3	0	0	0	0	6

Sheet E	1	2	3	4	5	6	7	8	9	10	Final
Scotland (Carson) 🔨	1	0	0	0	1	0	1	0	2	0	5
Germany (Kapp)	0	2	1	1	0	1	0	1	0	2	8

==== Draw 5 ====
Tuesday, February 28, 9:00

Sheet A	1	2	3	4	5	6	7	8	9	10	11	Final
United States (Sampson)	1	0	1	0	2	0	0	3	0	1	0	8
Norway (Høstmælingen) 🔨	0	2	0	1	0	2	2	0	1	0	2	10

Sheet B	1	2	3	4	5	6	7	8	9	10	Final
China (Kim) 🔨	3	0	1	2	0	0	3	X	X	X	9
Scotland (Carson)	0	1	0	0	2	0	0	X	X	X	3

Sheet C	1	2	3	4	5	6	7	8	9	10	Final
Canada (Rooney) 🔨	2	0	3	0	0	1	0	3	X	X	9
Turkey (Karagöz)	0	1	0	1	0	0	1	0	X	X	3

Sheet D	1	2	3	4	5	6	7	8	9	10	Final
Germany (Kapp) 🔨	3	0	1	0	0	2	0	0	2	0	8
Switzerland (Iseli)	0	1	0	2	1	0	0	1	0	1	6

Sheet E	1	2	3	4	5	6	7	8	9	10	Final
Italy (Colli) 🔨	1	2	0	0	3	2	0	4	X	X	12
South Korea (Kim)	0	0	3	1	0	0	1	0	X	X	5

==== Draw 6 ====
Tuesday, February 28, 19:00

Sheet A	1	2	3	4	5	6	7	8	9	10	Final
China (Fei)	1	0	1	0	0	3	2	0	4	X	11
South Korea (Kim) 🔨	0	1	0	1	0	0	0	1	0	X	3

Sheet B	1	2	3	4	5	6	7	8	9	10	Final
Norway (Høstmælingen) 🔨	1	1	0	0	1	0	0	X	X	X	3
Canada (Rooney)	0	0	4	2	0	2	1	X	X	X	9

Sheet C	1	2	3	4	5	6	7	8	9	10	Final
Italy (Colli)	0	1	0	0	0	1	1	0	0	1	4
Germany (Kapp) 🔨	0	0	1	1	0	0	0	1	0	0	3

Sheet D	1	2	3	4	5	6	7	8	9	10	Final
Turkey (Karagöz)	0	0	0	2	0	2	0	X	X	X	4
United States (Sampson) 🔨	0	2	2	0	3	0	4	X	X	X	11

Sheet E	1	2	3	4	5	6	7	8	9	10	Final
Switzerland (Iseli)	0	1	0	1	0	0	1	0	0	X	3
Scotland (Carson) 🔨	2	0	1	0	1	0	0	1	3	X	8

==== Draw 7 ====
Wednesday, March 1, 14:00

Sheet A	1	2	3	4	5	6	7	8	9	10	Final
Germany (Kapp) 🔨	0	3	1	1	0	2	0	2	2	X	11
Turkey (Karagöz)	1	0	0	0	2	0	1	0	0	X	4

Sheet B	1	2	3	4	5	6	7	8	9	10	Final
Switzerland (Iseli) 🔨	0	0	1	1	3	0	1	0	2	X	8
United States (Sampson)	0	0	0	0	0	2	0	1	0	X	3

Sheet C	1	2	3	4	5	6	7	8	9	10	Final
South Korea (Kim) 🔨	0	1	0	1	0	0	2	0	2	0	6
Scotland (Carson)	0	0	3	0	0	1	0	1	0	2	7

Sheet D	1	2	3	4	5	6	7	8	9	10	Final
China (Fei)	1	0	1	0	0	2	0	3	0	0	7
Norway (Høstmælingen) 🔨	0	1	0	1	0	0	2	0	2	0	6

Sheet E	1	2	3	4	5	6	7	8	9	10	Final
Canada (Rooney) 🔨	1	1	0	1	0	0	0	1	0	X	4
Italy (Colli)	0	0	0	0	0	3	2	0	3	X	8

==== Draw 8 ====
Thursday, March 2, 9:00

Sheet A	1	2	3	4	5	6	7	8	9	10	Final
Scotland (Carson) 🔨	0	1	0	0	0	2	0	2	1	X	6
United States (Sampson)	0	0	0	1	0	0	1	0	0	X	2

Sheet B	1	2	3	4	5	6	7	8	9	10	Final
Italy (Colli)	0	0	0	3	0	2	0	0	1	0	6
China (Fei) 🔨	0	1	1	0	2	0	1	1	0	1	7

Sheet C	1	2	3	4	5	6	7	8	9	10	Final
Turkey (Karagöz)	0	0	1	0	0	1	0	X	X	X	2
Switzerland (Iseli) 🔨	0	3	0	3	1	0	2	X	X	X	9

Sheet D	1	2	3	4	5	6	7	8	9	10	Final
Canada (Rooney)	0	0	0	1	0	0	1	0	X	X	2
Germany (Kapp) 🔨	0	0	2	0	0	4	0	2	X	X	8

Sheet E	1	2	3	4	5	6	7	8	9	10	Final
South Korea (Kim) 🔨	0	1	0	1	0	0	0	1	0	X	3
Norway (Høstmælingen)	0	0	3	0	1	1	0	0	1	X	6

==== Draw 9 ====
Thursday, March 2, 19:00

Sheet A	1	2	3	4	5	6	7	8	9	10	Final
Italy (Colli)	0	0	0	0	0	1	0	0	2	1	4
Switzerland (Iseli) 🔨	0	1	0	1	0	0	0	1	0	0	3

Sheet B	1	2	3	4	5	6	7	8	9	10	Final
Turkey (Karagöz) 🔨	1	0	1	0	0	1	0	X	X	X	3
South Korea (Kim)	0	1	0	0	4	0	6	X	X	X	11

Sheet C	1	2	3	4	5	6	7	8	9	10	Final
Germany (Kapp)	0	0	1	0	1	0	0	0	1	0	3
China (Fei) 🔨	0	0	0	1	0	1	0	1	0	1	4

Sheet D	1	2	3	4	5	6	7	8	9	10	Final
Norway (Høstmælingen) 🔨	1	0	1	0	0	0	2	0	1	X	5
Scotland (Carson)	0	3	0	3	0	1	0	1	0	X	8

Sheet E	1	2	3	4	5	6	7	8	9	10	Final
United States (Sampson)	0	0	1	0	2	0	2	0	0	X	5
Canada (Rooney) 🔨	0	1	0	2	0	1	0	3	4	X	11

=== Playoffs ===
Semifinal
1	Germany	9
4	Norway	6
2	Scotland	1
3	China	8

Final
1	Germany	7
3	China	8

Bronze medal game
4	Norway	4
2	Scotland	11

==== Semifinals ====
Friday, March 3, 19:00

Sheet B	1	2	3	4	5	6	7	8	9	10	Final
Germany (Kapp) 🔨	2	0	2	0	0	0	1	2	0	2	9
Norway (Høstmælingen)	0	2	0	2	0	1	0	0	1	0	6

Sheet D	1	2	3	4	5	6	7	8	9	10	Final
Scotland (Carson) 🔨	0	0	1	0	0	0	0	0	0	X	1
China (Fei)	0	0	0	2	0	0	1	1	4	X	8

==== Bronze medal game ====
Saturday, March 4, 14:00

Sheet E	1	2	3	4	5	6	7	8	9	10	Final
Norway (Høstmælingen)	0	1	0	0	2	0	1	0	0	X	4
Scotland (Carson) 🔨	3	0	1	1	0	3	0	1	2	X	11

==== Final ====
Saturday, March 4, 14:00

Sheet C	1	2	3	4	5	6	7	8	9	10	Final
Germany (Kapp) 🔨	0	2	0	0	1	0	2	1	1	0	7
China (Fei)	0	0	3	1	0	3	0	0	0	1	8

=== Final standings ===
Key
Teams relegated to 2023 World Junior-B Curling Championships

Place	Team
1st place, gold medalist(s)	China
2nd place, silver medalist(s)	Germany
3rd place, bronze medalist(s)	Scotland
4	Norway
5	Italy
6	Switzerland
7	United States
8	Canada
9	South Korea
10	Turkey

== Women ==
=== Qualification ===
The following nations qualified to participate in the 2023 World Junior Curling Championship:

Event	Vacancies	Qualified
Host Nation	1	Germany
2022 World Junior Curling Championships	6	Japan; Sweden; United States; Norway; Switzerland; Latvia
2022 World Junior-B Curling Championships (December)	3	Canada; Scotland; South Korea
TOTAL	10	

=== Teams ===
The teams are listed as follows:

Canada	Germany	Japan	Latvia	Norway
Skip: Emily Deschenes; Third: Lauren Ferguson; Second: Alison Umlah; Lead: Cate Fitzgerald	Fourth: Kim Sutor; Skip: Sara Messenzehl; Second: Zoé Antes; Lead: Anne Kapp; Alternate: Elisa Scheurel	Skip: Yuina Miura; Third: Ai Matsunaga; Second: Yui Ueno; Lead: Eri Ogihara; Alternate: Yuna Sakuma	Skip: Evelīna Barone; Third: Rēzija Ieviņa; Second: Veronika Apse; Lead: Ērika Patrīcija Bitmete; Alternate: Marija Seliverstova	Skip: Torild Bjørnstad; Third: Nora Østgård; Second: Ingeborg Forbregd; Lead: Eilin Kjærland; Alternate: Siri Østågard
Scotland	South Korea	Sweden	Switzerland	United States
Skip: Fay Henderson; Third: Robyn Munro; Second: Holly Wilkie-Milne; Lead: Laura Watt; Alternate: Amy Mitchell	Skip: Kang Bo-bae; Third: Jo Ju-hee; Second: Kim Na-yeon; Lead: Lee You-sun; Alternate: Cheon Hee-seo	Skip: Moa Dryburgh; Third: Thea Orefjord; Second: Moa Tjärnlund; Lead: Moa Nilsson; Alternate: Erika Ryberg	Skip: Xenia Schwaller; Third: Selina Gafner; Second: Fabienne Rieder; Lead: Marion Wüest; Alternate: Selina Rychiger	Skip: Tessa Thurlow; Third: Jordan Hein; Second: Miranda Scheel; Lead: Amelia Hintz; Alternate: Anne O'Hara

=== Round robin standings ===
Final Round Robin Standings

Key
Teams to Playoffs
Teams relegated to 2023 "B" Championship

Country	Skip	W	L	W–L	PF	PA	EW	EL	BE	SE	DSC
Switzerland	Xenia Schwaller	9	0	–	68	30	39	21	7	16	38.73
Norway	Torild Bjørnstad	7	2	–	59	54	40	34	7	16	53.30
Scotland	Fay Henderson	6	3	1–0	55	55	38	34	5	10	55.06
Japan	Yuina Miura	6	3	0–1	63	43	38	32	5	13	44.60
Sweden	Moa Dryburgh	5	4	–	62	53	37	35	3	15	70.14
South Korea	Kang Bo-bae	4	5	–	55	56	36	40	10	9	58.49
United States	Tessa Thurlow	3	6	–	50	68	30	42	7	6	48.93
Canada	Emily Deschenes	2	7	1–0	49	72	36	41	3	10	65.76
Germany	Sara Messenzehl	2	7	0–1	52	65	31	38	5	8	76.78
Latvia	Evelīna Barone	1	8	–	50	67	34	42	3	8	46.47

Round Robin Summary Table
Pos.	Country	Canada	Germany	Japan	Latvia	Norway	Scotland	South Korea	Sweden	Switzerland	United States	Record
8	Canada	—N/a	7–6	3–12	6–10	4–7	7–6	4–7	5–7	6–8	7–9	2–7
9	Germany	6–7	—N/a	5–6	8–3	8–11	5–7	5–8	4–13	1–8	10–2	2–7
4	Japan	12–3	6–5	—N/a	7–5	9–3	3–4	7–6	5–8	4–5	10–4	6–3
10	Latvia	10–6	3–8	5–7	—N/a	5–6	5–8	4–8	4–7	7–8	7–9	1–8
2	Norway	7–4	11–8	3–9	6–5	—N/a	7–6	7–3	8–7	2–7	8–5	7–2
3	Scotland	6–7	7–5	4–3	8–5	6–7	—N/a	6–5	8–6	2–10	8–7	6–3
6	South Korea	7–4	8–5	6–7	8–4	3–7	5–6	—N/a	9–6	6–7	3–10	4–5
5	Sweden	7–5	13–4	8–5	7–4	7–8	6–8	6–9	—N/a	1–7	7–3	5–4
1	Switzerland	8–6	8–1	5–4	8–7	7–2	10–2	7–6	7–1	—N/a	8–1	9–0
7	United States	9–7	2–10	4–10	9–7	5–8	7–8	10–3	3–7	1–8	—N/a	3–6

=== Round robin results ===
==== Draw 1 ====
Saturday, February 25, 9:00

Sheet A	1	2	3	4	5	6	7	8	9	10	Final
Latvia (Barone) 🔨	1	1	0	0	0	0	1	1	0	X	4
Sweden (Dryburgh)	0	0	2	2	1	2	0	0	0	X	7

Sheet B	1	2	3	4	5	6	7	8	9	10	Final
United States (Thurlow) 🔨	1	1	1	0	0	3	2	2	X	X	10
South Korea (Kang)	0	0	0	1	2	0	0	0	X	X	3

Sheet C	1	2	3	4	5	6	7	8	9	10	Final
Japan (Miura)	0	0	0	0	0	2	0	0	2	0	4
Switzerland (Schwaller) 🔨	0	2	0	0	1	0	0	1	0	1	5

Sheet D	1	2	3	4	5	6	7	8	9	10	Final
Norway (Bjørnstad) 🔨	1	0	2	1	0	0	0	0	2	1	7
Canada (Deschenes)	0	1	0	0	2	0	0	1	0	0	4

Sheet E	1	2	3	4	5	6	7	8	9	10	Final
Scotland (Henderson) 🔨	0	2	0	2	1	0	1	1	0	X	7
Germany (Messenzehl)	0	0	2	0	0	1	0	0	2	X	5

==== Draw 2 ====
Saturday, February 25, 19:30

Sheet A	1	2	3	4	5	6	7	8	9	10	Final
South Korea (Kang) 🔨	1	1	0	0	1	0	0	0	0	X	3
Norway (Bjørnstad)	0	0	1	1	0	1	2	1	1	X	7

Sheet B	1	2	3	4	5	6	7	8	9	10	Final
Sweden (Dryburgh) 🔨	3	0	1	0	0	0	2	0	1	X	7
Canada (Deschenes)	0	2	0	1	0	1	0	1	0	X	5

Sheet C	1	2	3	4	5	6	7	8	9	10	Final
Scotland (Henderson)	0	0	0	2	1	0	1	0	1	3	8
Latvia (Barone) 🔨	0	1	2	0	0	1	0	1	0	0	5

Sheet D	1	2	3	4	5	6	7	8	9	10	Final
Germany (Messenzehl)	1	0	0	0	0	0	0	X	X	X	1
Switzerland (Schwaller) 🔨	0	0	2	1	2	2	1	X	X	X	8

Sheet E	1	2	3	4	5	6	7	8	9	10	Final
United States (Thurlow)	0	1	0	0	1	0	0	2	0	X	4
Japan (Miura) 🔨	2	0	1	1	0	2	2	0	2	X	10

==== Draw 3 ====
Sunday, February 26, 14:00

Sheet A	1	2	3	4	5	6	7	8	9	10	Final
Switzerland (Schwaller) 🔨	0	0	0	2	0	4	2	X	X	X	8
United States (Thurlow)	0	0	1	0	0	0	0	X	X	X	1

Sheet B	1	2	3	4	5	6	7	8	9	10	Final
Latvia (Barone) 🔨	0	1	0	0	1	0	1	0	X	X	3
Germany (Messenzehl)	1	0	0	1	0	2	0	4	X	X	8

Sheet C	1	2	3	4	5	6	7	8	9	10	11	Final
Sweden (Dryburgh)	0	1	0	0	1	1	0	2	2	0	0	7
Norway (Bjørnstad) 🔨	0	0	1	3	0	0	1	0	0	2	1	8

Sheet D	1	2	3	4	5	6	7	8	9	10	Final
Japan (Miura)	0	0	1	0	0	1	0	0	1	0	3
Scotland (Henderson) 🔨	0	0	0	2	0	0	0	1	0	1	4

Sheet E	1	2	3	4	5	6	7	8	9	10	Final
South Korea (Kang) 🔨	0	1	0	2	1	0	2	0	1	0	7
Canada (Deschenes)	0	0	1	0	0	1	0	1	0	1	4

==== Draw 4 ====
Monday, February 27, 9:00

Sheet A	1	2	3	4	5	6	7	8	9	10	Final
Canada (Deschenes) 🔨	1	0	0	1	0	2	0	0	2	1	7
Scotland (Henderson)	0	1	1	0	2	0	2	0	0	0	6

Sheet B	1	2	3	4	5	6	7	8	9	10	Final
Japan (Miura)	0	1	0	5	0	0	1	2	X	X	9
Norway (Bjørnstad) 🔨	1	0	1	0	0	1	0	0	X	X	3

Sheet C	1	2	3	4	5	6	7	8	9	10	Final
Germany (Messenzehl) 🔨	0	1	0	0	1	0	0	2	1	0	5
South Korea (Kang)	0	0	0	1	0	4	1	0	0	2	8

Sheet D	1	2	3	4	5	6	7	8	9	10	Final
Switzerland (Schwaller)	0	1	0	0	4	2	0	0	0	1	8
Latvia (Barone) 🔨	2	0	2	2	0	0	0	1	0	0	7

Sheet E	1	2	3	4	5	6	7	8	9	10	Final
Sweden (Dryburgh)	0	1	2	1	0	1	1	1	0	X	7
United States (Thurlow) 🔨	1	0	0	0	1	0	0	0	1	X	3

==== Draw 5 ====
Monday, February 27, 19:00

Sheet A	1	2	3	4	5	6	7	8	9	10	11	Final
Japan (Miura)	0	0	2	0	0	0	0	0	3	1	1	7
South Korea (Kang) 🔨	1	1	0	0	0	2	1	1	0	0	0	6

Sheet B	1	2	3	4	5	6	7	8	9	10	Final
Scotland (Henderson) 🔨	0	2	0	2	0	0	2	1	0	1	8
Sweden (Dryburgh)	0	0	1	0	1	2	0	0	2	0	6

Sheet C	1	2	3	4	5	6	7	8	9	10	Final
Latvia (Barone) 🔨	2	0	2	0	1	0	0	0	2	3	10
Canada (Deschenes)	0	0	0	1	0	1	3	1	0	0	6

Sheet D	1	2	3	4	5	6	7	8	9	10	Final
United States (Thurlow)	0	0	0	0	1	0	1	0	X	X	2
Germany (Messenzehl) 🔨	1	1	0	2	0	4	0	2	X	X	10

Sheet E	1	2	3	4	5	6	7	8	9	10	Final
Norway (Bjørnstad)	0	0	1	0	1	0	0	0	0	X	2
Switzerland (Schwaller) 🔨	0	1	0	0	0	2	0	3	1	X	7

==== Draw 6 ====
Tuesday, February 28, 14:00

Sheet A	1	2	3	4	5	6	7	8	9	10	Final
Scotland (Henderson)	0	0	1	0	1	0	X	X	X	X	2
Switzerland (Schwaller) 🔨	1	1	0	4	0	4	X	X	X	X	10

Sheet B	1	2	3	4	5	6	7	8	9	10	Final
South Korea (Kang) 🔨	1	0	0	3	0	2	0	1	1	X	8
Latvia (Barone)	0	1	0	0	2	0	1	0	0	X	4

Sheet C	1	2	3	4	5	6	7	8	9	10	Final
Norway (Bjørnstad) 🔨	1	0	0	1	0	3	0	2	1	X	8
United States (Thurlow)	0	0	1	0	2	0	2	0	0	X	5

Sheet D	1	2	3	4	5	6	7	8	9	10	Final
Canada (Deschenes)	0	0	0	1	0	0	2	0	X	X	3
Japan (Miura) 🔨	0	2	2	0	1	4	0	3	X	X	12

Sheet E	1	2	3	4	5	6	7	8	9	10	Final
Germany (Messenzehl)	0	0	3	0	1	0	X	X	X	X	4
Sweden (Dryburgh) 🔨	2	4	0	3	0	4	X	X	X	X	13

==== Draw 7 ====
Wednesday, March 1, 9:00

Sheet A	1	2	3	4	5	6	7	8	9	10	Final
United States (Thurlow) 🔨	3	1	0	0	4	0	1	0	0	X	9
Canada (Deschenes)	0	0	2	1	0	2	0	1	1	X	7

Sheet B	1	2	3	4	5	6	7	8	9	10	Final
Germany (Messenzehl) 🔨	0	2	0	1	1	0	1	0	0	0	5
Japan (Miura)	0	0	1	0	0	1	0	2	1	1	6

Sheet C	1	2	3	4	5	6	7	8	9	10	Final
Switzerland (Schwaller)	1	1	2	1	0	0	2	X	X	X	7
Sweden (Dryburgh) 🔨	0	0	0	0	0	1	0	X	X	X	1

Sheet D	1	2	3	4	5	6	7	8	9	10	Final
Scotland (Henderson)	0	0	0	1	0	3	0	1	0	1	6
South Korea (Kang) 🔨	0	0	0	0	1	0	2	0	2	0	5

Sheet E	1	2	3	4	5	6	7	8	9	10	Final
Latvia (Barone)	0	1	0	0	0	1	0	2	0	1	5
Norway (Bjørnstad) 🔨	0	0	2	1	1	0	1	0	1	0	6

==== Draw 8 ====
Wednesday, March 1, 19:00

Sheet A	1	2	3	4	5	6	7	8	9	10	Final
Sweden (Dryburgh)	1	0	0	1	0	1	0	4	1	X	8
Japan (Miura) 🔨	0	0	2	0	2	0	1	0	0	X	5

Sheet B	1	2	3	4	5	6	7	8	9	10	Final
Norway (Bjørnstad)	0	0	2	0	0	1	2	0	1	1	7
Scotland (Henderson) 🔨	1	0	0	1	1	0	0	3	0	0	6

Sheet C	1	2	3	4	5	6	7	8	9	10	Final
Canada (Deschenes) 🔨	0	0	2	0	0	1	2	0	1	1	7
Germany (Messenzehl)	1	0	0	1	1	0	0	3	0	0	6

Sheet D	1	2	3	4	5	6	7	8	9	10	Final
Latvia (Barone)	1	0	0	1	0	0	2	0	3	0	7
United States (Thurlow) 🔨	0	2	3	0	0	1	0	2	0	1	9

Sheet E	1	2	3	4	5	6	7	8	9	10	Final
Switzerland (Schwaller) 🔨	2	0	0	1	0	1	0	1	0	2	7
South Korea (Kang)	0	2	1	0	1	0	1	0	1	0	6

==== Draw 9 ====
Thursday, March 2, 14:00

Sheet A	1	2	3	4	5	6	7	8	9	10	Final
Norway (Bjørnstad)	0	0	2	0	3	0	2	4	0	X	11
Germany (Messenzehl) 🔨	0	2	0	1	0	3	0	0	2	X	8

Sheet B	1	2	3	4	5	6	7	8	9	10	Final
Canada (Deschenes)	0	0	2	0	0	0	2	0	2	0	6
Switzerland (Schwaller) 🔨	0	2	0	1	2	0	0	2	0	1	8

Sheet C	1	2	3	4	5	6	7	8	9	10	Final
United States (Thurlow)	0	0	1	0	3	0	3	0	0	0	7
Scotland (Henderson) 🔨	1	1	0	2	0	1	0	1	0	2	8

Sheet D	1	2	3	4	5	6	7	8	9	10	Final
South Korea (Kang) 🔨	0	0	1	0	1	0	0	5	0	2	9
Sweden (Dryburgh)	0	0	0	2	0	2	1	0	1	0	6

Sheet E	1	2	3	4	5	6	7	8	9	10	Final
Japan (Miura)	0	0	1	0	2	1	1	0	1	1	7
Latvia (Barone) 🔨	0	1	0	2	0	0	0	2	0	0	5

=== Playoffs ===
Semifinal
1	Switzerland	5
4	Japan	7
2	Norway	5
3	Scotland	6

Final
4	Japan	7
3	Scotland	9

Bronze medal game
1	Switzerland	5
2	Norway	8

==== Semifinals ====
Friday, March 3, 14:00

Sheet B	1	2	3	4	5	6	7	8	9	10	Final
Switzerland (Schwaller) 🔨	0	3	0	0	0	1	0	0	1	0	5
Japan (Miura)	1	0	2	0	0	0	0	1	0	3	7

Sheet D	1	2	3	4	5	6	7	8	9	10	Final
Norway (Bjørnstad) 🔨	0	0	1	1	1	0	0	2	0	0	5
Scotland (Henderson)	0	1	0	0	0	3	0	0	0	2	6

==== Bronze medal game ====
Saturday, March 4, 9:00

Sheet C	1	2	3	4	5	6	7	8	9	10	Final
Switzerland (Schwaller) 🔨	0	2	0	1	0	0	1	0	1	0	5
Norway (Bjørnstad)	0	0	2	0	3	1	0	1	0	1	8

==== Final ====
Saturday, March 4, 9:00

Sheet E	1	2	3	4	5	6	7	8	9	10	Final
Japan (Miura)	0	0	2	2	0	2	0	1	0	0	7
Scotland (Henderson) 🔨	0	3	0	0	1	0	0	0	3	2	9

=== Final standings ===
Key
Teams relegated to 2023 World Junior-B Curling Championships

Place	Team
1st place, gold medalist(s)	Scotland
2nd place, silver medalist(s)	Japan
3rd place, bronze medalist(s)	Norway
4	Switzerland
5	Sweden
6	South Korea
7	United States
8	Canada
9	Germany
10	Latvia
