= Su Tingyu =

Chinese curler (born 2000)

- Curler
- Born: August 25, 2000 (age 26); Jilin, China

Team
- Curling club: CSO Curling Club, Beijing, CHN
- Skip: Wang Rui
- Third: Han Yu
- Second: Dong Ziqi
- Lead: Jiang Jiayi
- Alternate: Su Tingyu

Curling career
- Member Association: China
- World Championship: 2 (2025, 2026)
- Pan Continental Championship: 2 (2024, 2025)
- Olympic: 1 (2026)
- Other appearances: Asian Winter Games: 1 (2025)
Medal record
Women's curling
Representing China
World Championships
Bronze medal – third place	2025 Uijeongbu
Asian Winter Games
Silver medal – second place	2025 Harbin	Women's
Pan Continental Championships
Gold medal – first place	2025 Virginia
Bronze medal – third place	2024 Lacombe

Su Tingyu (Chinese: 苏亭毓; pinyin: Su Tingyu, born August 25, 2000 in Jilin) is a Chinese curler from Beijing. She is currently the alternate on the Chinese national women's curling team skipped by Wang Rui. With Wang, she won a silver medal at the 2025 Asian Winter Games and bronze medals at the 2024 Pan Continental Curling Championships and the 2025 World Women's Curling Championship.

== Career ==
Su made her international debut at the 2022 World Mixed Doubles Qualification Event with partner Li Menghua, attempting to qualify China for the 2023 World Mixed Doubles Curling Championship. Through the round robin, the pair posted an undefeated 6–0 record, advancing to the playoffs as the first seed. They then lost consecutive games to Austria and New Zealand, failing to qualify for the world championship.

In September 2024, Su was selected to be on the Chinese national women's team skipped by Wang Rui. The team also included Han Yu, Dong Ziqi and Jiang Jiayi. On tour, the team fared quite well, reaching the final of the 2024 Curlers Corner Autumn Gold Curling Classic and the Mercure Perth Masters and the semifinals at the 2024 Stu Sells Oakville Tankard. At the 2024 Pan Continental Curling Championships, they lost their first three games before winning four straight matches to qualify for the playoffs. They then lost in an extra end to world number one ranked Canada's Rachel Homan in the semifinals but bounced back to beat Japan's Miyu Ueno to claim the bronze medal. This earned the team a spot at the 2025 World Women's Curling Championship later in the season.

Before the World Championship, Team Wang competed in the 2025 Asian Winter Games in February 2025. There, they had another strong performance, finishing 7–1 in the round robin. After beating Japan in the semifinals, they lost in the final to South Korea's Gim Eun-ji, the team that also beat them in the round robin, settling for silver. The following month, the team played in the World Championship. After mixed results through the first half of the tournament, the team won four of their last six games to advance to the playoff round as the fifth seeds. Facing Sweden's Anna Hasselborg in the quarterfinals, China scored three in the tenth end to win 8–7 after two angle raises by Wang to finish the game. They then lost to Switzerland's Silvana Tirinzoni in the semifinal but rebounded in the bronze medal game by beating South Korea's Gim 9–4. By winning the bronze medal, the team also secured enough points to directly qualify China for the 2026 Winter Olympics and avoid the last chance Olympic Qualification Event.

During the 2025–26 season, Team Wang would participate in their first Grand Slam of Curling event at the 2025 Masters. At the event, Wang would finish with a 1–3 record. The team would then go on to represent China at the 2025 Pan Continental Curling Championships, where they would have an impressive week, going undefeated in the tournament and beating Canada's Rachel Homan 7–6 in the final.

== Personal life ==
Su is the first athlete from Qinghai to compete in the Asian Winter Games.

== Teams ==
Season	Skip	Third	Second	Lead	Alternate
2024–25	Wang Rui	Han Yu	Dong Ziqi	Jiang Jiayi	Su Tingyu
2025–26	Wang Rui	Han Yu	Dong Ziqi	Jiang Jiayi	Su Tingyu
