= Iron Trail Motors Event Center =

Event center in the city of Virginia, Minnesota

Coordinates: 47.51696°N 92.54740°W

- MECC
- Interactive map of Iron Trail Motors Event Center
- Location: 919 6th St S Virginia, Minnesota 55792
- Owner: The City of Virginia
- Operator: The City of Virginia
- Capacity: 5,000+
- Surface: Ice
- Public transit: Arrowhead Transit

Construction
- Opened: 2021
- Cost: $38 Million

Tenant
- Rock Ridge Wolverines (2021–present)

Iron Trail Motors Event Center is an ice arena and Event Center located in the city of Virginia, Minnesota. It was completed in September 2021. The two-story building has a 120,000 square-foot total area and includes two ice rinks, fitness facilities and a 6,400-square-foot ballroom for weddings. It can also be used as a venue center for concerts. The arena offers skating lessons, open skating and open hockey. The arena is the home rink for the Rock Ridge Wolverines Hockey. The Rock Ridge Youth Hockey Association coordinates the youth hockey program.

== History ==
The Miners Memorial Building was originally built in 1958 and that arena was used for Virginia Blue Devils hockey until the 2020-2021 season and was demolished in 2021 after the last high school game in the Miners Virginia vs. Eveleth. The two teams were rivals until the 2021 season when the two teams as the Rock Ridge Wolverines due to the new Rock Ridge High school and elementary schools being opened in 2022 (Elem.) and 2023 (HS). The new Iron Trail Motors Event Center was originally going to be named Miners Event Convention Center (MECC) but Iron Trail Motors, a car dealership in Virginia off U.S. 53 bought stakes in the arena in summer 2021 and changed the name for 20 years at a cost of 1.1 million dollars.

== Pan Continental Curling Championships ==
The Pan Continental Curling Championships are an annual curling tournament, held every year in late October or early November. The event is used to qualify teams from the America and Pacific-Asia zones for the World Curling Championships, with the top five teams from the A division earning qualification. World Curling announced that the Iron Trail Motors Event Center in Virginia, Minnesota, United States will host the 2025 edition of the Pan Continental Curling Championships A-Division on 19 – 26 of October, 2025.

== Public bus transportation ==
Local public transit is provided by Arrowhead Transit, which has a bus stop outside of the Iron Trail Motors Event Center and operates a demand response service.
