= Wang Zhenhao =

Chinese curler (born 2005)

- Curler
- Born: August 17, 2005 (age 21); Shandong, China

Team
- Curling club: CSO Curling Club, Beijing, CHN
- Skip: Xu Xiaoming
- Third: Fei Xueqing
- Second: Li Zhichao
- Lead: Xu Jingtao
- Alternate: Wang Zhenhao

Curling career
- Member Association: China
- World Championship: 1 (2026)
- World Junior Mixed Doubles Curling Championship: 1 (2025)
- Olympic: 1 (2026)

Wang Zhenhao (Chinese: 王振豪; pinyin: Wang Zhenhao, born August 17, 2005) is a Chinese curler from Shandong. He is currently the alternate on the Chinese national men's curling team skipped by Xu Xiaoming. With Xu, he represented China at the 2026 Winter Olympics.

== Career ==
Wang first represented China internationally at the 2025 World Junior Mixed Doubles Curling Championship. Partnered with Li Ziru, the pair finished 5–1 in the round robin, however, missed out on the playoffs due to a worse draw shot total then Scotland and the United States.

In December 2025, Wang joined the Chinese national men's team as their alternate for the Olympic Qualification Event. There, the team finished first through the round robin with a 6–1 record, earning two chances to qualify for the Games. After losing to the United States in the first qualifier, the team defeated Japan to earn the tenth and final spot at the 2026 Winter Olympics.

== Teams ==
| Season | Skip | Third | Second | Lead | Alternate |
|---|---|---|---|---|---|
| 2025–26 | Xu Xiaoming | Fei Xueqing | Li Zhichao | Xu Jingtao | Wang Zhenhao |
