= Wang Rui (curler) =

Chinese curler (born 1995)

- Curler
- Born: February 9, 1995 (age 31); Harbin, Heilongjiang, China

Team
- Curling club: Harbin CC, Harbin, Heilongjiang
- Skip: Wang Rui
- Third: Han Yu
- Second: Dong Ziqi
- Lead: Jiang Jiayi
- Alternate: Su Tingyu

Curling career
- Member Association: China
- World Championship: 7 (2014, 2015, 2017, 2018, 2019, 2025, 2026)
- World Mixed Doubles Championship: 2 (2016, 2017)
- Pacific-Asia Championship: 3 (2014, 2015, 2018)
- Pan Continental Championship: 2 (2024, 2025)
- Olympic: 3 (2018, 2022, 2026)
- Other appearances: Asian Winter Games: 2 (2017, 2025)
Medal record
Curling
Representing China
World Women's Championship
Bronze medal – third place	2025 Uijeongbu
World Mixed Doubles Championship
Silver medal – second place	2016 Karlstad
Bronze medal – third place	2017 Lethbridge
Asian Winter Games
Gold medal – first place	2017 Sapporo	Women's
Silver medal – second place	2025 Harbin	Women's
Pan Continental Championships
Gold medal – first place	2025 Virginia
Bronze medal – third place	2024 Lacombe
Pacific-Asia Championships
Gold medal – first place	2014 Karuizawa
Bronze medal – third place	2015 Almaty
Bronze medal – third place	2018 Gangneung
Pacific-Asia Junior Championships
Silver medal – second place	2015 Naseby
Silver medal – second place	2014 Harbin
Bronze medal – third place	2012 Jeonju City

Wang Rui (Chinese: 王芮; pinyin: Wáng Ruì; Mandarin pronunciation: [wǎŋ ɻwêɪ]; born February 9, 1995, in Harbin, China) is a Chinese curler. She currently skips her own team.

== Career ==
=== Juniors ===
Wang represented China in four Pacific-Asia Junior Curling Championships, playing second for the team in 2011 and 2012 and third for the team in 2014 and 2015. The team would finish in 4th place in 2011, win a bronze in 2012, and silver in 2014 and 2015.

=== Women's ===
Wang first represented China at the women's level when she was a team member at the 2014 Ford World Women's Curling Championship. She played second on that team, skipped by Liu Sijia. The team finished the round robin with a 6–5 record, in 7th place and out of the playoffs. Later that year, she played at the 2014 Pacific-Asia Curling Championships, throwing lead rocks for the Liu rink. There, they would go on to win the gold medal. This earned the team a spot at the 2015 World Women's Curling Championship. The team finished the round robin with a 7–4 record in a tie with Scotland for the last playoff spot. They would lose to Scotland in the tiebreaker, settling for 5th place overall.

The following season, the team played in the 2015 Pacific-Asia Curling Championships, where they won a bronze medal, which meant that China did not qualify for the Worlds that season. Wang did not go home empty-handed that year, though, as she teamed up with Ba Dexin to represent China at the 2016 World Mixed Doubles Curling Championship. The pair would finish 2nd in their group, losing only one match, which was good enough to make the playoffs. They would defeat Denmark, Estonia, and Scotland before losing to Russia in the final, taking home silver medals.

Wang would join the Wang Bingyu rink as her third. They would win a gold medal at the 2017 Asian Winter Games and would represent China at the 2017 World Women's Curling Championship, finishing in 11th place.

Wang and Ba represented China in the mixed doubles tournament of the 2018 Winter Olympics and finished in fifth place. The pair finished the round robin with a 4–3 record but lost in a tiebreak match against Norway.

Wang threw fourth stones for the Chinese women's team in 2019, debuting at the 2019 World Qualification Event, which she won with teammates Mei Jie, Yao Mingyue and Ma Jingyi. This qualified China for the 2019 World Women's Curling Championship, which the team played in. There, the rink finished round robin with a 7–5 record and then lost in their quarterfinal match against Switzerland. Wang would compete as third alongside Han Yu on home soil at the 2022 Winter Olympics, where the team would finish 4–5 in the round-robin, finishing 7th.

Wang would return to international curling skipping the Chinese national team alongside Han, Dong Ziqi, and Jiang Jiayi at 2024 Pan Continental Curling Championships, where the team would win a bronze medal, qualifying them to return for the 2025 World Women's Curling Championship. In preparation for the World Championships, Wang and her rink would also represent China at the 2025 Asian Winter Games, where they would go on to win a silver medal, losing to South Korea's Gim Eun-ji 7–2 in the final. At the 2025 Worlds, the team finished the round robin with a 7–5 record, and would go on to win a bronze medal, this time beating Gim 9–4 in the bronze medal game. This bronze medal performance also qualified the Chinese women's team for the 2026 Winter Olympics.

During the 2025–26 season, Team Wang would participate in their first Grand Slam of Curling event at the 2025 Masters. At the event, Wang would finish with a 1–3 record. The team would then go on to represent China at the 2025 Pan Continental Curling Championships, where they would have an impressive week, going undefeated in the tournament and beating Canada's Rachel Homan 7–6 in the final.

== Grand Slam record ==
Key
C	Champion
F	Lost in Final
SF	Lost in Semifinal
QF	Lost in Quarterfinals
R16	Lost in the round of 16
Q	Did not advance to playoffs
T2	Played in Tier 2 event
DNP	Did not participate in event
N/A	Not a Grand Slam event that season

Event	2025–26
Masters	Q
The National	Q
Canadian Open	QF
