= Pan Continental Curling Championships =

International curling tournament

- Established: 2022
- Abolished: 2025

The Pan Continental Curling Championships were an annual curling tournament, held every year in late October or early November. The event was used to qualify teams from the America and Pacific-Asia zones for the World Curling Championships, with the top five teams from the A division earning qualification. The championship was created to combine the Pacific-Asia Curling Championships and the Americas Challenge into one event, and create a stronger continental competition to mirror the established European Curling Championships.

The last edition of the Pan Continental Curling Championships was in 2025, with World Curling announcing that it will be replaced through the implementation of the new World Curling Championship B and C Divisions, which now serve as the qualification for men's and women's teams to the World Championships starting in the 2026–27 curling season.

== Summary ==
Name of fourth, then third, second, lead and alternate (if have) listed below country. Name of skip is in Bold.

=== Men's ===
Year	Location	Final			Third Place Match
Year	Location	Champion	Score	Second Place	Third Place	Score	Fourth Place
2022	(Canada) Calgary	**Canada**; **Brad Gushue**; Mark Nichols; E. J. Harnden; Geoff Walker; Nathan Young	**11–3**	**South Korea**; **Jeong Byeong-jin**; Lee Jeong-jae; Kim Min-woo; Kim Tae-hwan	**United States**; **Korey Dropkin**; Andrew Stopera; Mark Fenner; Thomas Howell; Rich Ruohonen	**8–7**	**Japan**; **Riku Yanagisawa**; Tsuyoshi Yamaguchi; Takeru Yamamoto; Satoshi Koizumi; Yasumasa Tanida
2023	(Canada) Kelowna	**Canada**; **Brad Gushue**; Mark Nichols; E. J. Harnden; Geoff Walker; Jim Cotter	**8–3**	**South Korea**; **Park Jong-duk**; Jeong Yeong-seok; Oh Seung-hoon; Seong Ji-hoon; Lee Ki-bok	**Japan**; **Riku Yanagisawa**; Tsuyoshi Yamaguchi; Takeru Yamamoto; Satoshi Koizumi; Shingo Usui	**9–6**	**United States**; Korey Dropkin; **Andrew Stopera**; Mark Fenner; Thomas Howell; Ben Richardson
2024	(Canada) Lacombe	**China**; **Xu Xiaoming**; Fei Xueqing; Wang Zhiyu; Li Zhichao; Ye Jianjun	**6–4**	**Japan**; Tetsuro Shimizu; **Shinya Abe**; Hayato Sato; Haruto Ouchi; Sota Tsuruga	**United States**; **John Shuster**; Chris Plys; Colin Hufman; Matt Hamilton; John Landsteiner	**10–8**	**Canada**; **Brad Gushue**; Mark Nichols; Brendan Bottcher; Geoff Walker; Adam Casey
2025	(United States) Virginia & Eveleth	**Canada**; **Brad Jacobs**; Marc Kennedy; Brett Gallant; Ben Hebert; Tyler Tardi	**7–3**	**United States**; **John Shuster**; Chris Plys; Colin Hufman; Matt Hamilton; Daniel Casper	**Japan**; Riku Yanagisawa; **Tsuyoshi Yamaguchi**; Takeru Yamamoto; Satoshi Koizumi; Shingo Usui	**6–5**	**China**; **Xu Xiaoming**; Fei Xueqing; Li Zhichao; Xu Jingtao; Yang Bohao

=== Women's ===
Year	Location	Final			Third Place Match
Year	Location	Champion	Score	Second Place	Third Place	Score	Fourth Place
2022	(Canada) Calgary	**Japan**; **Satsuki Fujisawa**; Chinami Yoshida; Yumi Suzuki; Yurika Yoshida; Kotomi Ishizaki	**8–6**	**South Korea**; **Ha Seung-youn**; Kim Hye-rin; Yang Tae-i; Kim Su-jin	**Canada**; **Kerri Einarson**; Val Sweeting; Shannon Birchard; Briane Harris; Rachelle Brown	**7–5**	**United States**; **Tabitha Peterson**; Cory Thiesse; Becca Hamilton; Tara Peterson; Vicky Persinger
2023	(Canada) Kelowna	**South Korea**; **Gim Eun-ji**; Kim Min-ji; Kim Su-ji; Seol Ye-eun; Seol Ye-ji	**11–6**	**Japan**; **Satsuki Fujisawa**; Chinami Yoshida; Yumi Suzuki; Yurika Yoshida; Kotomi Ishizaki	**United States**; **Tabitha Peterson**; Cory Thiesse; Tara Peterson; Becca Hamilton; Vicky Persinger	**8–7**	**Canada**; **Kerri Einarson**; Val Sweeting; Shannon Birchard; Briane Harris; Dawn McEwen
2024	(Canada) Lacombe	**Canada**; **Rachel Homan**; Tracy Fleury; Emma Miskew; Sarah Wilkes; Rachelle Brown	**6–5**	**South Korea**; **Gim Eun-ji**; Kim Min-ji; Kim Su-ji; Seol Ye-eun; Seol Ye-ji	**China**; **Wang Rui**; Han Yu; Dong Ziqi; Jiang Jiayi; Su Tingyu	**7–3**	**Japan**; **Miyu Ueno**; Yui Ueno; Junko Nishimuro; Asuka Kanai; Kaho Onodera
2025	(United States) Virginia & Eveleth	**China**; **Wang Rui**; Han Yu; Dong Ziqi; Jiang Jiayi; Su Tingyu	**7–6**	**Canada**; **Rachel Homan**; Tracy Fleury; Emma Miskew; Sarah Wilkes; Rachelle Brown	**South Korea**; **Gim Eun-ji**; Kim Min-ji; Kim Su-ji; Seol Ye-eun; Seol Ye-ji	**11–8**	**United States**; **Tabitha Peterson**; Cory Thiesse; Tara Peterson; Taylor Anderson-Heide; Aileen Geving

== Medal summary ==
=== Overall ===
Rank	Nation	Gold	Silver	Bronze	Total
1	Canada (CAN)	4	1	1	6
2	China (CHN)	2	0	1	3
3	South Korea (KOR)	1	4	1	6
4	Japan (JPN)	1	2	2	5
5	United States (USA)	0	1	3	4
Totals (5 entries)		8	8	8	24

=== Men's ===
Rank	Nation	Gold	Silver	Bronze	Total
1	Canada (CAN)	3	0	0	3
2	China (CHN)	1	0	0	1
3	South Korea (KOR)	0	2	0	2
4	Japan (JPN)	0	1	2	3
4	United States (USA)	0	1	2	3
Totals (5 entries)		4	4	4	12

=== Women's ===
Rank	Nation	Gold	Silver	Bronze	Total
1	South Korea (KOR)	1	2	1	4
2	Canada (CAN)	1	1	1	3
3	Japan (JPN)	1	1	0	2
4	China (CHN)	1	0	1	2
5	United States (USA)	0	0	1	1
Totals (5 entries)		4	4	4	12

== Performance timeline ==
=== Men's (A division) ===
Country	2020s				Years
Country	22	23	24	25	Years
Australia	7	6	6	8	4
Brazil	8				1
Canada	1st place, gold medalist(s)	1st place, gold medalist(s)	4	1st place, gold medalist(s)	4
China			1st place, gold medalist(s)	4	2
Chinese Taipei	6	7	8		3
Guyana		8			1
Japan	4	3rd place, bronze medalist(s)	2nd place, silver medalist(s)	3rd place, bronze medalist(s)	4
New Zealand	5	5	7	7	4
Philippines				6	1
South Korea	2nd place, silver medalist(s)	2nd place, silver medalist(s)	5	5	4
United States	3rd place, bronze medalist(s)	4	3rd place, bronze medalist(s)	2nd place, silver medalist(s)	4

=== Women's (A division) ===
Country	2020s				Years
Country	22	23	24	25	Years
Australia	6	8		6	3
Brazil	9				1
Canada	3rd place, bronze medalist(s)	4	1st place, gold medalist(s)	2nd place, silver medalist(s)	4
China			3rd place, bronze medalist(s)	1st place, gold medalist(s)	2
Chinese Taipei		6	8		2
Hong Kong	8				1
Japan	1st place, gold medalist(s)	2nd place, silver medalist(s)	4	5	4
Kazakhstan	7				1
Mexico		7	7	8	3
New Zealand	5	5	6	7	4
South Korea	2nd place, silver medalist(s)	1st place, gold medalist(s)	2nd place, silver medalist(s)	3rd place, bronze medalist(s)	4
United States	4	3rd place, bronze medalist(s)	5	4	4

== Multiple medallists ==
=== Men's ===
No.	Curler	Country	Period (Note: Period from the first to the last medals won.)	Gold medal – first place	Silver medal – second place	Bronze medal – third place	Total
1	Brad Gushue	Canada	2022–2023	2	–	–	2
1	Mark Nichols	Canada	2022–2023	2	–	–	2
1	E. J. Harnden	Canada	2022–2023	2	–	–	2
1	Geoff Walker	Canada	2022–2023	2	–	–	2
1	John Shuster	United States	2024–2025	–	1	1	2
1	Chris Plys	United States	2024–2025	–	1	1	2
1	Colin Hufman	United States	2024–2025	–	1	1	2
1	Matt Hamilton	United States	2024–2025	–	1	1	2
1	Riku Yanagisawa	Japan	2023–2025	–	–	2	2
1	Tsuyoshi Yamaguchi	Japan	2023–2025	–	–	2	2
1	Takeru Yamamoto	Japan	2023–2025	–	–	2	2
1	Satoshi Koizumi	Japan	2023–2025	–	–	2	2
1	Shingo Usui	Japan	2023–2025	–	–	2	2

=== Women's ===
No.	Curler	Country	Period	Gold medal – first place	Silver medal – second place	Bronze medal – third place	Total
1	Rachelle Brown	Canada	2022–2025	1	1	1	3
1	Eun-ji Gim	South Korea	2023–2025	1	1	1	3
1	Min-ji Kim	South Korea	2023–2025	1	1	1	3
1	Su-ji Kim	South Korea	2023–2025	1	1	1	3
1	Ye-eun Seol	South Korea	2023–2025	1	1	1	3
1	Ye-ji Seol	South Korea	2023–2025	1	1	1	3
7	Satsuki Fujisawa	Japan	2022–2023	1	1	–	2
7	Chinami Yoshida	Japan	2022–2023	1	1	–	2
7	Yumi Suzuki	Japan	2022–2023	1	1	–	2
7	Yurika Yoshida	Japan	2022–2023	1	1	–	2
7	Kotomi Ishizaki	Japan	2022–2023	1	1	–	2
7	Rachel Homan	Canada	2024–2025	1	1	–	2
7	Tracy Fleury	Canada	2024–2025	1	1	–	2
7	Emma Miskew	Canada	2024–2025	1	1	–	2
7	Sarah Wilkes	Canada	2024–2025	1	1	–	2
7	Rui Wang	China	2024–2025	1	–	1	2
7	Yu Han	China	2024–2025	1	–	1	2
7	Ziqi Dong	China	2024–2025	1	–	1	2
7	Jiayi Jiang	China	2024–2025	1	–	1	2
7	Tingyu Su	China	2024–2025	1	–	1	2

== Records ==
Most championship titles
Discipline	Curler	Country	No.	Years
Men's	Brad Gushue	Canada	2	2022–2023
Men's	Mark Nichols	Canada	2	2022–2023
Men's	E. J. Harnden	Canada	2	2022–2023
Men's	Geoff Walker	Canada	2	2022–2023

Most championship finals
Discipline	Curler	Country	No.	Years
Men's	Brad Gushue	Canada	2	2022–2023
Men's	Mark Nichols	Canada	2	2022–2023
Men's	E. J. Harnden	Canada	2	2022–2023
Men's	Geoff Walker	Canada	2	2022–2023
Women's	Satsuki Fujisawa	Japan	2	2022–2023
Women's	Chinami Yoshida	Japan	2	2022–2023
Women's	Yumi Suzuki	Japan	2	2022–2023
Women's	Yurika Yoshida	Japan	2	2022–2023
Women's	Kotomi Ishizaki	Japan	2	2022–2023
Women's	Gim Eun-ji	South Korea	2	2023–2024
Women's	Kim Min-ji	South Korea	2	2023–2024
Women's	Kim Su-ji	South Korea	2	2023–2024
Women's	Seol Ye-eun	South Korea	2	2023–2024
Women's	Seol Ye-ji	South Korea	2	2023–2024
Women's	Rachel Homan	Canada	2	2024–2025
Women's	Tracy Fleury	Canada	2	2024–2025
Women's	Emma Miskew	Canada	2	2024–2025
Women's	Sarah Wilkes	Canada	2	2024–2025
Women's	Rachelle Brown	Canada	2	2024–2025

Most championship medals
Discipline	Curler	Country	No.	Years
Men's	Brad Gushue	Canada	2	2022–2023
Men's	Mark Nichols	Canada	2	2022–2023
Men's	E. J. Harnden	Canada	2	2022–2023
Men's	Geoff Walker	Canada	2	2022–2023
Men's	Riku Yanagisawa	Japan	2	2023, 2025
Men's	Tsuyoshi Yamaguchi	Japan	2	2023, 2025
Men's	Takeru Yamamoto	Japan	2	2023, 2025
Men's	Satoshi Koizumi	Japan	2	2023, 2025
Men's	Shingo Usui	Japan	2	2023, 2025
Men's	John Shuster	United States	2	2024–2025
Men's	Chris Plys	United States	2	2024–2025
Men's	Colin Hufman	United States	2	2024–2025
Men's	Matt Hamilton	United States	2	2024–2025
Women's	Rachelle Brown	Canada	3	2022, 2024–2025
Women's	Gim Eun-ji	South Korea	3	2023–2025
Women's	Kim Min-ji	South Korea	3	2023–2025
Women's	Kim Su-ji	South Korea	3	2023–2025
Women's	Seol Ye-eun	South Korea	3	2023–2025
Women's	Seol Ye-ji	South Korea	3	2023–2025

Most championship appearances (Note: Only appearance in A division counts.)
Discipline	Curler	Country	No.	Years
Men's	Tanner Davis	Australia	4	2022–2025
Women's	Cory Thiesse	United States	4	2022–2025
Women's	Tara Peterson	United States	4	2022–2025

Most titles at back-to-back events
Discipline	Curler	Country	No.	Period
Men's	Brad Gushue	Canada	2	2022–2023
Men's	Mark Nichols	Canada	2	2022–2023
Men's	E. J. Harnden	Canada	2	2022–2023
Men's	Geoff Walker	Canada	2	2022–2023

Most finals at back-to-back events
Discipline	Curler	Country	No.	Period
Men's	Brad Gushue	Canada	2	2022–2023
Men's	Mark Nichols	Canada	2	2022–2023
Men's	E. J. Harnden	Canada	2	2022–2023
Men's	Geoff Walker	Canada	2	2022–2023
Women's	Satsuki Fujisawa	Japan	2	2022–2023
Women's	Chinami Yoshida	Japan	2	2022–2023
Women's	Yumi Suzuki	Japan	2	2022–2023
Women's	Yurika Yoshida	Japan	2	2022–2023
Women's	Kotomi Ishizaki	Japan	2	2022–2023
Women's	Gim Eun-ji	South Korea	2	2023–2024
Women's	Kim Min-ji	South Korea	2	2023–2024
Women's	Kim Su-ji	South Korea	2	2023–2024
Women's	Seol Ye-eun	South Korea	2	2023–2024
Women's	Seol Ye-ji	South Korea	2	2023–2024
Women's	Rachel Homan	Canada	2	2024–2025
Women's	Tracy Fleury	Canada	2	2024–2025
Women's	Emma Miskew	Canada	2	2024–2025
Women's	Sarah Wilkes	Canada	2	2024–2025
Women's	Rachelle Brown	Canada	2	2024–2025

Most medals at back-to-back events
Discipline	Curler	Country	No.	Period
Men's	Brad Gushue	Canada	2	2022–2023
Men's	Mark Nichols	Canada	2	2022–2023
Men's	E. J. Harnden	Canada	2	2022–2023
Men's	Geoff Walker	Canada	2	2022–2023
Men's	John Shuster	United States	2	2024–2025
Men's	Chris Plys	United States	2	2024–2025
Men's	Colin Hufman	United States	2	2024–2025
Men's	Matt Hamilton	United States	2	2024–2025
Women's	Gim Eun-ji	South Korea	3	2023–2025
Women's	Kim Min-ji	South Korea	3	2023–2025
Women's	Kim Su-ji	South Korea	3	2023–2025
Women's	Seol Ye-eun	South Korea	3	2023–2025
Women's	Seol Ye-ji	South Korea	3	2023–2025

Most appearances at back-to-back events
Discipline	Curler	Country	No.	Period
Men's	Tanner Davis	Australia	4	2022–2025
Women's	Cory Thiesse	United States	4	2022–2025
Women's	Tara Peterson	United States	4	2022–2025

Teams went undefeated in championship
Discipline	Year	Country	Skip	Games played
Men's	2025	Canada	Brad Jacobs	9
Women's	2024	Canada	Rachel Homan	9
Women's	2025	China	Wang Rui	9

== See also ==
- World Curling Championships
- World Qualification Event
- European Curling Championships
- Pacific-Asia Curling Championships
- Americas Challenge
