= 2019 Hokkaido Bank Curling Classic =

World Curling Tour event

- Host city: Sapporo, Japan
- Dates: August 1–4, 2019
- Men's winner: (Japan) Team Matsumura
- Curling club: Hokkaido CS, Hokkaido
- Skip: Yuta Matsumura
- Third: Tetsuro Shimizu
- Second: Yasumasa Tanida
- Lead: Shinya Abe
- Finalist: (Canada) Scott McDonald
- Women's winner: (China) Team Jiang
- Curling club: Harbin CC, Harbin
- Skip: Jiang Yilun
- Third: Zhang Lijun
- Second: Dong Ziqi
- Lead: Jiang Xindi
- Finalist: (Japan) Satsuki Fujisawa

The 2019 Hokkaido Bank Curling Classic was held August 1–4, 2019 in Sapporo, Japan. It was the second event of the 2019–20 curling season. The total purse for the event was ¥ 1,700,000.

In the Men's event, Yuta Matsumura defeated Scott McDonald 7–2 in the final and Kirk Muyres beat Kim Soo-hyuk 7–3 in the Bronze Medal Game. In the Women's event, Jiang Yilun defeated Satsuki Fujisawa 7–2 in the final and Mei Jie beat Tracy Fleury 7–5 in the Bronze Medal Game.

== Men ==
=== Teams ===
The teams are listed as follows:

Skip	Third	Second	Lead	Locale
Jason Gunnlaugson	Alex Forrest	Adam Casey	Connor Njegovan	Winnipeg, Manitoba, Canada
Go Aoki (Fourth)	Kei Kamada (Skip)	Ayato Sasaki	Kouki Ogiwara	Sapporo, Japan
Junpei Kanda	Hiromu Otani	Kizuki Ryokawa	Shotaro Hashimoto	Tokyo, Japan
Kim Soo-hyuk	Lee Jeong-jae	Jeong Byeong-jin	Hwang Hyeon-jun	Seoul, South Korea
Yuta Matsumura	Tetsuro Shimizu	Yasumasa Tanida	Shinya Abe	Kitami, Japan
Scott McDonald	Jonathan Beuk	Wesley Forget	Scott Chadwick	Kingston, Ontario, Canada
Yusuke Morozumi	Masaki Iwai	Ryotaro Shukuya	Kosuke Morozumi	Karuizawa, Japan
Kirk Muyres	Kevin Marsh	Dan Marsh	Dallan Muyres	Saskatoon, Saskatchewan, Canada
Park Jong-duk	Nam Yoon-ho	Yoo Min-hyeon	Kim Jeong-min	Gangwon, South Korea
Ba Dexin (Fourth)	Zou Qiang (Skip)	Wang Zhiyu	Xu Jingtao	Beijing, China

=== Round-robin standings ===
Final round-robin standings

Key
Teams to Playoffs

Pool A	W	L
(Japan) Yuta Matsumura	3	1
(South Korea) Kim Soo-hyuk	3	1
(Canada) Jason Gunnlaugson	3	1
(China) Zou Qiang	1	3
(Japan) Junpei Kanda	0	4

Pool B	W	L
(Canada) Scott McDonald	3	1
(Canada) Kirk Muyres	2	2
(Japan) Kei Kamada	2	2
(South Korea) Park Jong-duk	2	2
(Japan) Yusuke Morozumi	1	3

=== Round-robin results ===
All draw times are listed in Japan Standard Time (UTC+09:00).

==== Draw 2 ====
Thursday, August 1, 13:00

Sheet B	1	2	3	4	5	6	7	8	Final
(China) Zou Qiang	0	2	0	1	0	0	0	0	3
(South Korea) Kim Soo-hyuk 🔨	2	0	0	0	2	1	0	1	6

Sheet C	1	2	3	4	5	6	7	8	Final
(Canada) Kirk Muyres	0	0	1	1	1	0	1	X	4
(Canada) Scott McDonald 🔨	3	1	0	0	0	1	0	X	5

Sheet D	1	2	3	4	5	6	7	8	Final
(Japan) Kei Kamada	0	0	0	2	0	1	1	1	5
(Japan) Yusuke Morozumi 🔨	2	0	0	0	1	0	0	0	3

Sheet E	1	2	3	4	5	6	7	8	Final
(Japan) Junpei Kanda	0	1	1	0	0	2	0	1	5
(Canada) Jason Gunnlaugson 🔨	4	0	0	0	2	0	0	0	6

==== Draw 3 ====
Friday, August 2, 08:00

Sheet B	1	2	3	4	5	6	7	8	Final
(Canada) Kirk Muyres 🔨	0	0	2	0	1	0	0	X	3
(South Korea) Park Jong-duk	2	2	0	3	0	1	2	X	10

Sheet C	1	2	3	4	5	6	7	8	Final
(Canada) Jason Gunnlaugson	0	0	2	0	0	0	0	2	4
(China) Zou Qiang 🔨	0	1	0	1	0	0	1	0	3

Sheet D	1	2	3	4	5	6	7	8	Final
(Japan) Junpei Kanda	0	0	0	0	0	0	X	X	0
(Japan) Yuta Matsumura 🔨	2	0	2	0	1	1	X	X	6

Sheet E	1	2	3	4	5	6	7	8	Final
(Canada) Scott McDonald	0	0	1	3	0	1	0	X	5
(Japan) Kei Kamada 🔨	0	1	0	0	1	0	1	X	3

==== Draw 5 ====
Friday, August 2, 15:00

Sheet B	1	2	3	4	5	6	7	8	Final
(Canada) Jason Gunnlaugson	0	0	0	2	0	0	3	0	5
(Japan) Yuta Matsumura 🔨	0	1	1	0	3	1	0	1	7

Sheet C	1	2	3	4	5	6	7	8	Final
(South Korea) Kim Soo-hyuk	0	0	1	2	0	1	0	1	5
(Japan) Junpei Kanda 🔨	1	0	0	0	1	0	1	0	3

Sheet D	1	2	3	4	5	6	7	8	9	Final
(Canada) Scott McDonald	0	2	2	0	0	2	0	0	1	7
(South Korea) Park Jong-duk 🔨	1	0	0	0	3	0	1	1	0	6

Sheet E	1	2	3	4	5	6	7	8	Final
(Japan) Yusuke Morozumi	0	3	0	2	0	1	0	1	7
(Canada) Kirk Muyres 🔨	2	0	3	0	3	0	0	0	8

==== Draw 7 ====
Saturday, August 3, 08:00

Sheet B	1	2	3	4	5	6	7	8	Final
(South Korea) Park Jong-duk	0	1	0	2	0	3	0	X	6
(Japan) Yusuke Morozumi 🔨	1	0	1	0	1	0	0	X	3

Sheet C	1	2	3	4	5	6	7	8	Final
(Japan) Kei Kamada	0	0	0	0	0	0	0	X	0
(Canada) Kirk Muyres 🔨	0	0	1	0	1	1	0	X	3

Sheet D	1	2	3	4	5	6	7	8	Final
(Japan) Yuta Matsumura 🔨	2	0	1	0	0	2	1	0	6
(South Korea) Kim Soo-hyuk	0	4	0	0	1	0	0	2	7

Sheet E	1	2	3	4	5	6	7	8	Final
(China) Zou Qiang 🔨	3	1	2	2	0	1	X	X	9
(Japan) Junpei Kanda	0	0	0	0	1	0	X	X	1

==== Draw 9 ====
Saturday, August 3, 15:00

Sheet B	1	2	3	4	5	6	7	8	Final
(Japan) Yusuke Morozumi 🔨	2	0	0	2	2	0	2	X	8
(Canada) Scott McDonald	0	1	2	0	0	2	0	X	5

Sheet C	1	2	3	4	5	6	7	8	Final
(South Korea) Park Jong-duk 🔨	0	0	0	2	0	2	0	0	4
(Japan) Kei Kamada	0	0	2	0	2	0	1	1	6

Sheet D	1	2	3	4	5	6	7	8	Final
(South Korea) Kim Soo-hyuk 🔨	1	0	2	0	0	1	0	X	4
(Canada) Jason Gunnlaugson	0	2	0	2	3	0	2	X	9

Sheet E	1	2	3	4	5	6	7	8	Final
(Japan) Yuta Matsumura	0	2	0	2	2	0	0	X	6
(China) Zou Qiang 🔨	2	0	0	0	0	1	1	X	4

=== Playoffs ===
Semifinals
A1	(Japan) Yuta Matsumura	6
B2	(Canada) Kirk Muyres	5
B1	(Canada) Scott McDonald	7
A2	(South Korea) Kim Soo-hyuk	2

Final
A1	(Japan) Yuta Matsumura	7
B1	(Canada) Scott McDonald	2

Bronze-medal game
B2	(Canada) Kirk Muyres	7
A2	(South Korea) Kim Soo-hyuk	3

==== Semifinals ====
Sunday, August 4, 08:00

Sheet C	1	2	3	4	5	6	7	8	Final
(Canada) Scott McDonald	0	0	1	0	3	3	X	X	7
(South Korea) Kim Soo-hyuk 🔨	1	0	0	1	0	0	X	X	2

Sheet E	1	2	3	4	5	6	7	8	9	Final
(Japan) Yuta Matsumura	0	1	0	0	0	2	1	1	1	6
(Canada) Kirk Muyres 🔨	2	0	0	3	0	0	0	0	0	5

==== Final ====
Sunday, August 4, 11:30

Sheet B	1	2	3	4	5	6	7	8	Final
(Japan) Yuta Matsumura 🔨	3	0	2	1	1	0	X	X	7
(Canada) Scott McDonald	0	1	0	0	0	1	X	X	2

==== Bronze-medal game ====
Sunday, August 4, 11:30

Sheet D	1	2	3	4	5	6	7	8	Final
(Canada) Kirk Muyres 🔨	0	1	1	0	2	0	1	2	7
(South Korea) Kim Soo-hyuk	0	0	0	1	0	2	0	0	3

== Women ==
=== Teams ===
The teams are listed as follows:

Skip	Third	Second	Lead	Locale
Tracy Fleury	Selena Njegovan	Taylor McDonald	Kristin MacCuish	East St. Paul, Manitoba, Canada
Satsuki Fujisawa	Chinami Yoshida	Yumi Suzuki	Yurika Yoshida	Kitami, Japan
Miki Hayashi	Yako Matsuzawa	Kairi Ito	Manami Ohara	Sapporo, Japan
Jiang Yilun	Zhang Lijun	Dong Ziqi	Jiang Xindi	Beijing, China
Tori Koana	Yuna Kotani	Mao Ishigaki	Arisa Kotani	Yamanashi, Japan
Wang Rui (Fourth)	Mei Jie (Skip)	Yao Mingyue	Ma Jingyi	Beijing, China
Ikue Kitazawa (Fourth)	Chiaki Matsumura	Seina Nakajima (Skip)	Hasumi Ishigooka	Nagano, Japan
Vlada Rumiantseva	Vera Tiuliakova	Irina Riazanova	Anastasia Mishchenko	Moscow, Russia
Momoha Tabata	Honoka Sasaki	Mikoto Nakajima	Mina Kobayashi	Sapporo, Japan
Sayaka Yoshimura	Kaho Onodera	Anna Ohmiya	Yumie Funayama	Sapporo, Japan

=== Round-robin standings ===
Final round-robin standings

Key
Teams to Playoffs

Pool A	W	L
(Japan) Satsuki Fujisawa	3	1
(China) Jiang Yilun	3	1
(Japan) Sayaka Yoshimura	3	1
(Russia) Vlada Rumiantseva	1	3
(Japan) Momoha Tabata	0	4

Pool B	W	L
(China) Mei Jie	4	0
(Canada) Tracy Fleury	3	1
(Japan) Seina Nakajima	2	2
(Japan) Tori Koana	1	3
(Japan) Miki Hayashi	0	4

=== Round-robin results ===
All draw times are listed in Japan Standard Time (UTC+09:00).

==== Draw 1 ====
Thursday, August 1, 09:30

Sheet B	1	2	3	4	5	6	7	8	Final
(Japan) Miki Hayashi	2	0	0	0	0	1	0	X	3
(Japan) Tori Koana 🔨	0	3	1	1	1	0	3	X	9

Sheet C	1	2	3	4	5	6	7	8	Final
(Japan) Momoha Tabata	0	1	0	1	0	1	0	0	3
(China) Jiang Yilun 🔨	1	0	1	0	2	0	0	1	5

Sheet D	1	2	3	4	5	6	7	8	Final
(Russia) Vlada Rumiantseva	0	0	1	0	1	0	0	X	2
(Japan) Sayaka Yoshimura 🔨	2	1	0	1	0	0	0	X	4

Sheet E	1	2	3	4	5	6	7	8	Final
(China) Mei Jie 🔨	0	2	0	0	0	2	0	1	5
(Canada) Tracy Fleury	0	0	0	1	1	0	2	0	4

==== Draw 4 ====
Friday, August 2, 11:30

Sheet B	1	2	3	4	5	6	7	8	Final
(Japan) Momoha Tabata	0	0	2	0	1	0	1	X	4
(Japan) Satsuki Fujisawa 🔨	1	1	0	2	0	2	0	X	6

Sheet C	1	2	3	4	5	6	7	8	Final
(Canada) Tracy Fleury 🔨	4	0	0	1	1	0	1	X	7
(Japan) Miki Hayashi	0	0	1	0	0	1	0	X	2

Sheet D	1	2	3	4	5	6	7	8	Final
(China) Mei Jie	0	0	3	0	2	0	1	1	7
(Japan) Seina Nakajima 🔨	2	1	0	1	0	2	0	0	6

Sheet E	1	2	3	4	5	6	7	8	Final
(China) Jiang Yilun 🔨	4	0	1	1	0	2	0	X	8
(Russia) Vlada Rumiantseva	0	3	0	0	2	0	1	X	6

==== Draw 6 ====
Friday, August 2, 18:30

Sheet B	1	2	3	4	5	6	7	8	Final
(Canada) Tracy Fleury	0	0	3	1	0	2	1	X	7
(Japan) Seina Nakajima 🔨	1	1	0	0	2	0	0	X	4

Sheet C	1	2	3	4	5	6	7	8	Final
(China) Mei Jie 🔨	2	0	0	1	0	1	1	4	9
(Japan) Tori Koana	0	1	0	0	1	0	0	0	2

Sheet D	1	2	3	4	5	6	7	8	Final
(China) Jiang Yilun	0	0	2	0	3	0	0	X	5
(Japan) Satsuki Fujisawa 🔨	2	1	0	1	0	2	2	X	8

Sheet E	1	2	3	4	5	6	7	8	Final
(Japan) Sayaka Yoshimura	0	0	2	0	1	0	1	1	5
(Japan) Momoha Tabata 🔨	0	1	0	1	0	1	0	0	3

==== Draw 8 ====
Saturday, August 3, 11:30

Sheet B	1	2	3	4	5	6	7	8	Final
(Japan) Satsuki Fujisawa 🔨	0	1	0	0	1	0	2	0	4
(Japan) Sayaka Yoshimura	0	0	2	2	0	1	0	3	8

Sheet C	1	2	3	4	5	6	7	8	Final
(Russia) Vlada Rumiantseva 🔨	2	1	0	1	1	0	2	X	7
(Japan) Momoha Tabata	0	0	1	0	0	1	0	X	2

Sheet D	1	2	3	4	5	6	7	8	Final
(Japan) Seina Nakajima 🔨	1	3	1	0	0	0	1	X	6
(Japan) Tori Koana	0	0	0	1	1	2	0	X	4

Sheet E	1	2	3	4	5	6	7	8	Final
(Japan) Miki Hayashi 🔨	0	0	1	0	2	0	X	X	3
(China) Mei Jie	3	2	0	4	0	2	X	X	11

==== Draw 10 ====
Saturday, August 3, 18:30

Sheet B	1	2	3	4	5	6	7	8	Final
(Japan) Sayaka Yoshimura	0	0	0	0	1	0	X	X	1
(China) Jiang Yilun 🔨	0	2	1	3	0	1	X	X	7

Sheet C	1	2	3	4	5	6	7	8	Final
(Japan) Satsuki Fujisawa 🔨	1	2	0	1	0	3	1	X	8
(Russia) Vlada Rumiantseva	0	0	2	0	1	0	0	X	3

Sheet D	1	2	3	4	5	6	7	8	Final
(Japan) Tori Koana 🔨	0	0	2	0	0	0	X	X	2
(Canada) Tracy Fleury	3	2	0	0	1	2	X	X	8

Sheet E	1	2	3	4	5	6	7	8	Final
(Japan) Seina Nakajima 🔨	1	1	0	5	2	0	X	X	9
(Japan) Miki Hayashi	0	0	1	0	0	1	X	X	2

=== Playoffs ===
Semifinals
A1	(Japan) Satsuki Fujisawa	7
B2	(Canada) Tracy Fleury	6
B1	(China) Mei Jie	1
A2	(China) Jiang Yilun	4

Final
A1	(Japan) Satsuki Fujisawa	2
A2	(China) Jiang Yilun	7

Bronze-medal game
B2	(Canada) Tracy Fleury	5
B1	(China) Mei Jie	7

==== Semifinals ====
Sunday, August 4, 08:00

Sheet B	1	2	3	4	5	6	7	8	Final
(Japan) Satsuki Fujisawa 🔨	1	0	2	0	1	0	3	0	7
(Canada) Tracy Fleury	0	1	0	3	0	1	0	1	6

Sheet D	1	2	3	4	5	6	7	8	Final
(China) Mei Jie 🔨	0	0	0	0	1	0	0	X	1
(China) Jiang Yilun	0	1	0	1	0	0	2	X	4

==== Final ====
Sunday, August 4, 17:00

Sheet C	1	2	3	4	5	6	7	8	Final
(Japan) Satsuki Fujisawa 🔨	0	0	2	0	0	0	X	X	2
(China) Jiang Yilun	3	2	0	0	1	1	X	X	7

==== Bronze-medal game ====
Sunday, August 4, 17:00

Sheet E	1	2	3	4	5	6	7	8	Final
(Canada) Tracy Fleury	0	2	0	0	2	0	1	0	5
(China) Mei Jie 🔨	0	0	1	2	0	2	0	2	7
