= Jiang Xindi =

Chinese curler (born 1997)

- Curler
- Born: January 26, 1997 (age 29); Harbin, China

Team
- Curling club: Harbin CC, Harbin, Heilongjiang
- Skip: Han Yu
- Third: Wang Rui
- Second: Dong Ziqi
- Lead: Zhang Lijun
- Alternate: Jiang Xindi

Curling career
- Member Association: China
- World Championship: 2 (2018, 2021)
- Pacific-Asia Championship: 3 (2017, 2018, 2019)
- Olympic: 2 (2018, 2022)
- Other appearances: Pacific-Asia Junior Curling Championships: 3 (2011, 2013, 2015)
Medal record
Women's curling
Representing China
Pacific-Asia Curling Championships
Gold medal – first place	2019 Shenzhen
Bronze medal – third place	2017 Erina
Bronze medal – third place	2018 Gangneung
Pacific-Asia Junior Curling Championships
Silver medal – second place	2013 Tokoro
Silver medal – second place	2015 Naseby

Jiang Xindi, nicknamed "Cindy" (Chinese: 姜馨迪; born January 26, 1997, in Harbin, China) is a Chinese female curler. She was part of the Chinese women's curling team on 2018 Winter Olympics.

== Career ==
Jiang competed at the 2018 Winter Olympics in PyeongChang, where the Chinese team participated in the women's curling tournament. She competed at the 2018 World Women's Curling Championship where her team placed seventh. Jiang also won the bronze medal at the 2017 and 2018 Pacific-Asia Curling Championships and the silver medal at the 2013 and 2015 Pacific-Asia Junior Curling Championships.

To start the 2019–20 season, Jiang and her team won the World Curling Tour event, the 2019 Hokkaido Bank Curling Classic. She represented China at the 2019 Pacific-Asia Curling Championships as second for Han Yu. After going 6–1 in the round robin, they defeated Korea and Japan in the semifinal and final, respectively, to claim the title. It was China's first title since 2014. The victory earned a spot for China at the 2020 World Women's Curling Championship, which was cancelled due to COVID-19. A year later, the team represented China at the 2021 World Women's Curling Championship, finishing tenth with a 6–7 record.

== Teams ==
Season	Skip	Third	Second	Lead	Alternate	Coach	Events
2010–11	She Qiutong	Jiang Yilun	Wang Rui	Zhao Xiyang	Jiang Xindi	Ma Yongjun	PJCC 2011 (4th)
2012–13	Jiang Xindi	Zhao Xiyang	Fu Yiwei	Dong Ziqi	Yao Mingyue	Zhang Zhipeng	PAJCC 2013 (silver)
2014–15	Jiang Yilun	Wang Rui	Ma Jingyi	Zhao Xiyang	Jiang Xindi	Zhang Zhipeng	PAJCC 2015 (silver)
2015–16	Mei Jie	Gao Xuesong	Jiang Xindi	She Qiutong			
2015–16	Jiang Xindi	Zhang Lijun	Yin Yanxin	Zhu Zihui	Zhao Ruiyi	Shi Mengyu	WJBCC 2016 (5th)
2016–17	Jiang Yilun	Jiang Xindi	Yao Mingyue	Yan Hui			
2017–18	Jiang Yilun	Jiang Xindi	Yao Mingyue	Yan Hui	Xu Meng	Marcel Rocque	PACC 2017 (bronze)
2017–18	Wang Bingyu	Zhou Yan	Liu Jinli	Ma Jingyi	Jiang Xindi	Tan Weidong	OQE 2017 (gold); WOG 2018 (5th)
2017–18	Jiang Yilun	Wang Rui	Jiang Xindi	Yan Hui	Yao Mingyue	Tan Weidong	WWCC 2018 (7th)
2018–19	Jiang Yilun	Liu Sijia	Dong Ziqi	Jiang Xindi	Wang Rui (PACC)	Carolyn McRorie (PACC)	CWC 2018–19/1 (7th); PACC 2018 (bronze)
2018–19	Jiang Yilun	Zhang Lijun	Dong Ziqi	Jiang Xindi			
2019–20	Jiang Yilun	Zhang Lijun	Dong Ziqi	Jiang Xindi			
2019–20	Han Yu	Zhang Lijun	Jiang Xindi	Zhao Ruiyi	Yu Jiaxin	Marco Mariani, Sören Grahn	PACC 2019 (gold)
2019–20	Han Yu	Zhang Lijun	Jiang Xindi	Yu Jiaxin	Dong Ziqi	Marco Mariani	
2020–21	Han Yu	Dong Ziqi	Zhang Lijun	Jiang Xindi	Yan Hui	Marco Mariani, Sören Grahn	WWCC 2021 (10th)
2021–22	Han Yu	Wang Rui	Dong Ziqi	Zhang Lijun	Jiang Xindi	Marco Mariani, Sören Grahn	

== Private life ==
Jiang became involved in curling when her grandfather, middle school physics teacher Jiang Fang opened a curling club after he was inspired watching curling on TV broadcasting from 2006 Olympics in Turin. Many from her family plays curling too.

She is niece of competitive Chinese female curler Jiang Yilun, they are teammates for today.
