= 2020 World Women's Curling Championship =

- Host city: Prince George, Canada
- Arena: CN Centre
- Dates: March 14–22 (cancelled)

The 2020 World Women's Curling Championship (branded as the 2020 World Women's Curling Championship presented by Nature's Bounty for sponsorship reasons) was scheduled to be held from March 14 to 22 at the CN Centre in Prince George, Canada. On March 12, 2020, following the recommendations of Provincial Health Officer Bonnie Henry, the event was cancelled due to the COVID-19 pandemic.

The event was set to be the first event to start gathering points towards the 2022 Winter Olympic Qualification. Upon cancellation, the qualifying process was left unclear.

== Qualification ==
The following nations qualified to participate in the 2020 World Women's Curling Championship:

| Event | Vacancies | Qualified |
|---|---|---|
| Host nation | 1 | Canada |
| 2019 Americas Challenge | 1 | United States |
| 2019 European Curling Championships | 7 | Sweden; Scotland; Switzerland; Russia; Germany; Czech Republic; Denmark |
| 2019 Pacific-Asia Curling Championships | 2 | China; Japan |
| 2020 World Qualification Event | 2 | South Korea; Italy |
| TOTAL | 13 | |

=== World Ranking ===
The World Curling Federation World Ranking tracks and lists the success of all Member Associations.

| Member Associations | Rank | Points |
|---|---|---|
| Sweden | 1 | 81.569 |
| South Korea | 2 | 65.907 |
| Canada | 3 | 63.382 |
| Switzerland | 4 | 59.559 |
| Japan | 5 | 56.520 |
| Russia | 6 | 55.588 |
| Scotland | 7 | 50.098 |
| United States | 8 | 45.441 |
| China | 9 | 40.147 |
| Denmark | 10 | 27.059 |
| Czech Republic | 11 | 19.593 |
| Germany | 12 | 19.338 |
| Italy | 13 | 13.284 |

== Teams ==
The teams were to be:

| Canada | China | Czech Republic | Denmark | Germany |
|---|---|---|---|---|
| Gimli CC, Gimli Skip: Kerri Einarson; Third: Val Sweeting; Second: Shannon Birchard; Lead: Briane Meilleur; Alternate: Jennifer Clark-Rouire | CSO CC, Beijing & Harbin CC, Harbin Skip: Han Yu; Third: Zhang Lijun; Second: Jiang Xindi; Lead: Yu Jiaxin; Alternate: Dong Ziqi | CC Sokol Liboc, Prague Skip: Anna Kubešková; Third: Alžběta Baudyšová; Second: Petra Vinšová; Lead: Ežen Kolčevská; Alternate: Michaela Baudyšová | Hvidovre CC, Hvidovre, Tårnby CC, Tårnby & Copenhagen CC, Kastrup Skip: Mathilde Halse; Third: Jasmin Lander; Second: Karolina Jensen; Lead: Julie Høgh; Alternate: Madeleine Dupont | CC Füssen, Füssen & 1.SCV Geising, Geising Skip: Daniela Jentsch; Third: Emira Abbes; Second: Klara-Hermine Fomm; Lead: Analena Jentsch; Alternate: Mia Höhne |
| Italy | Japan | Russia | Scotland | South Korea |
| 3S Sys-tek, Pinerolo & CC Dolomiti, Cortina d'Ampezzo Skip: Veronica Zappone; Third: Stefania Constantini; Second: Angela Romei; Lead: Giulia Zardini Lacedelli; Alternate: Elena Dami | Tokoro CC, Kitami & SCAP Karuizawa Arena, Kariuzawa Skip: Satsuki Fujisawa; Third: Chinami Yoshida; Second: Yumi Suzuki; Lead: Yurika Yoshida; Alternate: Eri Ogihara | Adamant CC, Saint Petersburg Skip: Alina Kovaleva; Third: Maria Komarova; Second: Galina Arsenkina; Lead: Ekaterina Kuzmina; Alternate: Anastasia Danshina | Dunkeld CC, Pitlochry, Balfron CC, Balfron, Carrington CC, Edinburgh & Leswalt CC, Leswalt Skip: Eve Muirhead; Third: Lauren Gray; Second: Jennifer Dodds; Lead: Vicky Wright; Alternate: Sophie Sinclair | Gyeonggi-do CC, Uijeongbu Skip: Gim Un-chi; Third: Um Min-ji; Second: Kim Su-ji; Lead: Seol Ye-eun; Alternate: Seol Ye-ji |
| Sweden | Switzerland | United States | | |
| Sundbybergs CK, Sundbyberg Skip: Anna Hasselborg; Third: Sara McManus; Second: Agnes Knochenhauer; Lead: Sofia Mabergs; Alternate: Johanna Heldin | CC Oberwallis, Brig-Glis Fourth: Briar Hürlimann; Skip: Elena Stern; Second: Lisa Gisler; Lead: Celine Koller; Alternate: Corrie Hürlimann | St. Paul CC, St. Paul, Madison CC, Madison & Duluth CC, Duluth Skip: Tabitha Peterson; Third: Becca Hamilton; Second: Tara Peterson; Lead: Aileen Geving; Alternate: Allison Pottinger | | |

=== WCT ranking ===
Year to date World Curling Tour order of merit ranking for each team prior to the event.

| Nation (Skip) | Rank | Points |
|---|---|---|
| Sweden (Hasselborg) | 1 | 467.461 |
| Canada (Einarson) | 2 | 420.070 |
| Japan (Fujisawa) | 4 | 342.872 |
| Switzerland (Stern) | 6 | 333.591 |
| Scotland (Muirhead) | 9 | 283.984 |
| United States (Peterson) | 10 | 245.428 |
| Russia (Kovaleva) | 12 | 237.658 |
| South Korea (Gim) | 17 | 194.967 |
| China (Han) | 26 | 149.539 |
| Germany (Jentsch) | 30 | 135.678 |
| Italy (Zappone) | 76 | 46.404 |
| Czech Republic (Kubešková) | 79 | 45.753 |
| Denmark (Halse) | 148 | 12.838 |

== National playdowns ==
- (Canada) 2020 Scotties Tournament of Hearts
- (Russia) 2020 Russian Women's World Qualification Event
- (Switzerland) 2020 Swiss Women's Curling Championship
- 2020 United States Women's Curling Championship
