= Jiang Yilun =

Chinese curler from Harbin (born 1993)

Jiang Yilun 姜懿伦
- Curler
- Born: February 12, 1993 (age 33); Harbin, Heilongjiang, China

Team
- Curling club: Harbin CC, Harbin, Heilongjiang
- Skip: Jiang Yilun
- Third: Zhang Lijun
- Second: Dong Ziqi
- Lead: Jiang Xindi

Curling career
- Member Association: China
- World Championship: 3 (2014, 2015, 2018)
- Pacific-Asia Championship: 3 (2013, 2017, 2018)
- Olympic: 1 (2014)
Medal record
Curling
Representing China
Pacific-Asia Championships
Silver medal – second place	2013 Shanghai
Bronze medal – third place	2017 Erina
Bronze medal – third place	2018 Gangneung
Pacific Junior Championships
Gold medal – first place	2010 Nayoro
Silver medal – second place	2014 Harbin
Silver medal – second place	2015 Naseby
Bronze medal – third place	2012 Jeonju City

Jiang Yilun (simplified Chinese: 姜懿伦; traditional Chinese: 姜懿倫; pinyin: Jiāng Yìlún; born 12 February 1993) is a Chinese curler from Harbin.

== Career ==
She competed at the 2014 Winter Olympics in Sochi, where the Chinese team participated in the women's curling tournament. She has also competed in three World Curling Championships (2014, 2015 and 2018), three Pacific-Asia Curling Championships (2013, 2017 and 2018) and the 2010 World Junior Curling Championships.

On the World Curling Tour, Jiang has won the 2013 Shamrock Shotgun and the 2019 Hokkaido Bank Curling Classic.

== Teams ==
Season	Skip	Third	Second	Lead	Alternate	Coach	Events
2011–12	Jiang Yilun	She Qiutong	Wang Rui	Yao Mingyue	Mei Jie		
2012–13	Jiang Yilun	Wang Rui	Yao Mingyue	She Qiutong			
2013–14	Jiang Yilun	Wang Rui	Yao Mingyue	She Qiutong			
2013–14	Wang Bingyu	Liu Yin	Yue Qingshuang	Zhou Yan	Jiang Yilun		PACC 2013 (silver); OG 2014 (7th)
2013–14	Liu Sijia	Jiang Yilun	Wang Rui	Liu Jinli	She Qiutong		WWCC 2014 (7th)
2014–15	Jiang Yilun	Wang Rui	Ma Jingyi	Zhao Xiyang	Jiang Xindi	Zhang Zhipeng	PAJCC 2015 (silver)
2014–15	Liu Sijia	Jiang Yilun	Liu Jinli	Wang Rui	Yu Xinna		WWCC 2015 (5th)
2016–17	Jiang Yilun	Jiang Xindi	Yao Mingyue	Yan Hui			
2017–18	Jiang Yilun	Jiang Xindi	Yao Mingyue	Yan Hui	Xu Meng	Marcel Rocque	PACC 2017 (bronze)
2017–18	Jiang Yilun	Wang Rui	Jiang Xindi	Yan Hui	Yao Mingyue	Tan Weidong	WWCC 2018 (7th)
2018–19	Jiang Yilun	Liu Sijia	Dong Ziqi	Jiang Xindi	Wang Rui (PACC)	Carolyn McRorie (PACC)	CWC 2018–19/1 (7th); PACC 2018 (silver)
2018–19	Jiang Yilun	Zhang Lijun	Dong Ziqi	Jiang Xindi			
2019–20	Jiang Yilun	Zhang Lijun	Dong Ziqi	Jiang Xindi			
