= Yan Hui (curler) =

Chinese female curler

- Curler ♀
- Born: September 23, 1995 (age 31); Baishan, Jilin, China

Team
- Curling club: Harbin CC, Harbin
- Skip: Han Yu
- Third: Dong Ziqi
- Second: Zhang Lijun
- Lead: Jiang Xindi
- Alternate: Yan Hui

Curling career
- Member Association: China
- World Championship: 2 (2018, 2021)
- Pacific-Asia Championship: 1 (2017)
Medal record
Women's curling
Representing China
Pacific-Asia Championships
Bronze medal – third place	2017 Erina

Yan Hui (born September 23, 1995, in Baishan) is a Chinese female curler from Changchun. She is a 2017 Pacific-Asia bronze medallist.

== Teams ==
=== Women's ===
Season	Skip	Third	Second	Lead	Alternate	Coach	Events
2016–17	Jiang Yilun	Jiang Xindi	Yao Mingyue	Yan Hui			
2017–18	Jiang Yilun	Jiang Xindi	Yao Mingyue	Yan Hui	Xu Meng	Marcel Rocque	PACC 2017 (bronze)
2017–18	Jiang Yilun	Wang Rui	Jiang Xindi	Yan Hui	Yao Mingyue	Tan Weidong, Zhang Zhipeng	WWCC 2018 (7th)
2018–19	Zhang Di	Wang Meini	Fan Suyuan	Yan Hui			
2019–20	Han Siyu	Fan Suyuan	Yu Jiaxin	Yan Hui	Zhang Di		
2020–21	Han Yu	Dong Ziqi	Zhang Lijun	Jiang Xindi	Yan Hui	Marco Mariani, Sören Grahn	WWCC 2021 (10th)

=== Mixed doubles ===
Season	Male	Female
2019–20	Ku Cheng	Yan Hui
