= Yu Jiaxin =

Chinese female curler

- Curler ♀
- Born: March 26, 1998 (age 28); Inner Mongolia, China

Team
- Skip: Han Yu
- Third: Wang Meini
- Second: Tian Linyuan
- Lead: Yu Jiaxin

Curling career
- Member Association: China
- Pacific-Asia Championship: 1 (2019)
- Pan Continental Championship: 1 (2023)
- Other appearances: World Junior Championships: 1 (2018)
Medal record
Women's curling
Pacific-Asia Championships
Gold medal – first place	2019 Shenzhen
World Junior Championships
Bronze medal – third place	2018 Aberdeen

Yu Jiaxin (born March 26, 1998, in Inner Mongolia) is a Chinese female curler from Changchun. She currently plays lead on Team Han Yu. At the international level, she is a 2019 Pacific-Asia champion.

== Career ==
Yu was the alternate for the Chinese team at the 2018 World Junior Curling Championships where they won the bronze medal. She also was the alternate on the Chinese team skipped by Han Yu at the 2019 Pacific-Asia Curling Championships. They placed third after the round robin before defeating South Korea's Gim Un-chi in the semifinal and Japan's Seina Nakajima in the final.

== Teams ==
=== Women's ===
Season	Skip	Third	Second	Lead	Alternate	Coach	Events
2017–18	Dong Ziqi (fourth)	Wang Zixin (skip)	Wang Meini	Sun Chengyu	Yu Jiaxin	Zhu Yu	WJCC 2018 (bronze)
2018–19	Han Siyu	Liu Tong	Ding Yuexin	Yu Jiaxin			
2019–20	Han Yu	Zhang Lijun	Jiang Xindi	Zhao Ruiyi	Yu Jiaxin	Marco Mariani, Sören Grahn	PACC 2019 (gold)
2019–20	Han Siyu	Fan Suyuan	Yu Jiaxin	Yan Hui	Zhang Di		
2019–20	Han Yu	Zhang Lijun	Jiang Xindi	Yu Jiaxin	Dong Ziqi	Marco Mariani	WCC 2020
2023–24	Han Yu	Wang Meini	Tian Linyuan	Yu Jiaxin	Wang Rui (PCCC)		PCCC 2023

=== Mixed doubles ===
Season	Male	Female	Coach	Events
2018–19	Wang Xiangkun	Yu Jiaxin	Xu Xiaoming	CWC/1 (7th)
