= She Qiutong =

Chinese female curler

- Curler ♀
- Born: March 19, 1993 (age 33)

Team
- Curling club: Harbin CC, Harbin

Curling career
- Member Association: China
- World Championship: 1 (2014)
- Pacific-Asia Championship: 1 (2016)
- Other appearances: World Junior Championships: 1 (2010), Winter Universiade: 1 (2011), Pacific-Asian Junior Championships: 5 (2009, 2010, 2011, 2012, 2014)
Medal record
Curling
Pacific-Asian Junior Championships
Gold medal – first place	2010 Nayoro
Silver medal – second place	2009 Harbin
Silver medal – second place	2014 Harbin
Bronze medal – third place	2012 Jeonju City

She Qiutong (Chinese: 佘秋彤; pinyin: Shé Qiūtóng, born March 19, 1993) is a Chinese female curler.

== Teams ==
Season	Skip	Third	Second	Lead	Alternate	Coach	Events
2008–09	Liu Jinli	Chun Mei Zheng	Huang Sining	She Qiutong	Liu Sijia	Daniel Rafael, Zhao Zhenzhen	PJCC 2009 (silver)
2009–10	Liu Jinli	Liu Sijia	Chun Mei Zheng	She Qiutong	Jiang Yilun		PJCC 2010 (gold)
2009–10	Liu Sijia	Liu Jinli	Zheng Chunmei	Jiang Yilun	She Qiutong	Zhu Yu	WJCC 2010 (7th)
2010–11	Sun Yue	Liu Sijia	Chen Yinjie	She Qiutong	Jiang Yilun	Li Hongchen	WUG 2011 (5th)
2010–11	She Qiutong	Jiang Yilun	Wang Rui	Zhao Xiyang	Jiang Xindi	Ma Yongjun	PJCC 2011 (4th)
2011–12	Jiang Yilun	She Qiutong	Wang Rui	Yao Mingyue	Mei Jie	Zhang Zhipeng	PAJCC 2012 (bronze)
2012–13	Jiang Yilun	Wang Rui	Yao Mingyue	She Qiutong			
2013–14	Jiang Yilun	Wang Rui	Yao Mingyue	She Qiutong			
2013–14	Jiang Yilun	Wang Rui	Zhao Xiyang	Yao Mingyue	She Qiutong	Zhu Yu	PAJCC 2014 (silver)
2013–14	Liu Sijia (fourth)	Jiang Yilun (skip)	Wang Rui	Liu Jinli	She Qiutong		WCC 2014 (7th)
2014–15	Fu Yiwei	Sun Chengyu	Yang Ying	She Qiutong	Zhang Lijun		
2015–16	Mei Jie	Gao Xuesong	Jiang Xindi	She Qiutong			
