= Yuta Matsumura (curler) =

Japanese curler

- Curler
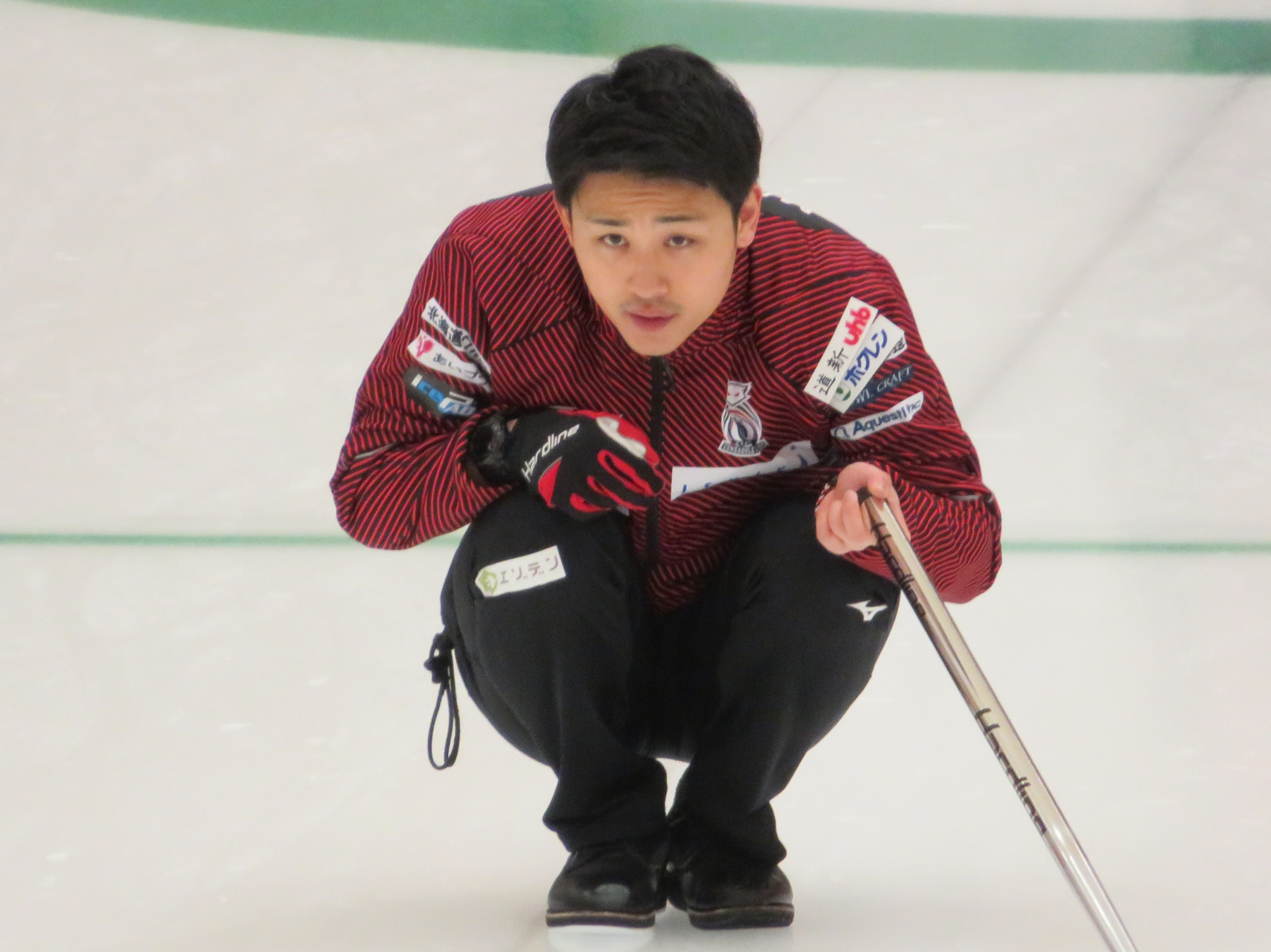
- Born: 29 September 1989 (age 37); Karuizawa, Nagano, Japan

Team
- Curling club: Hokkaido Consadole Sapporo Curling Team, Hokkaido, Japan
- Skip: Yusuke Morozumi
- Third: Yuta Matsumura
- Second: Ryotaro Shukuya
- Lead: Masaki Iwai
- Alternate: Kosuke Morozumi
- Mixed doubles partner: Yurika Yoshida

Curling career
- Member Association: Japan
- World Championship: 3 (2015, 2019, 2021)
- World Mixed Doubles Championship: 1 (2021)
- Pacific-Asia Championship: 3 (2007, 2018, 2019)
Medal record
Curling
Representing Japan
Pacific-Asia Championships
| Gold medal – first place | 2018 Gangneung |
| Silver medal – second place | 2019 Shenzhen |
Pacific-Asia Junior Championships
| Silver medal – second place | 2010 Nayoro |
| Silver medal – second place | 2008 Jeonju City |
| Bronze medal – third place | 2011 Naseby |
| Bronze medal – third place | 2007 Naseby |

Yuta Matsumura is a Japanese curler from Kitami. He was the skip of the Consadole curling team until 2022 when he joined TM Karuizawa skipped by Yusuke Morozumi.

== Career ==
Matsumura competed at the 2015 Ford World Men's Curling Championship in Halifax, Nova Scotia, Canada, as alternate for the Japanese team, which placed sixth in the tournament.

Matsumura won the 2018 Oakville Fall Classic, his first career World Curling Tour title. A month later he would also win the Driving Force Abbotsford Cashpiel.

Matsumura represented Japan in the 2018 Pacific-Asia Curling Championships in South Korea, which his team would end up winning, defeating China's Zou Qiang in the final. Later in the season he went on to win the 2019 Janapense Men's Championship and represented Japan at the 2019 World Men's Curling Championship as the team's skip. There, he led his team to a fourth-place finish, after losing the bronze medal game to Switzerland.

Matsumura began the 2019-20 curling season by winning the 2019 Hokkaido Bank Curling Classic. That season, he also won the Driving Force Decks International Abbotsford Cashspiel, the Kamloops Crown of Curling and the Karuizawa International. Team Matsumura represented Japan at the 2019 Pacific-Asia Curling Championships. After going 8-1 through the round robin and defeating China in the semi-final, they lost the final 11–2 to South Korea's Kim Chang-min. He then had to skip Japan at the 2020 World Qualification Event in order to qualify for the 2020 World Men's Curling Championship. There, the team only finished third, and did not qualify for the Worlds. However, the World Championship was cancelled due to the COVID-19 pandemic. The 2021 World Men's Curling Championship did occur in a fan-less bubble, and the field was increased to 14 teams, allowing Japan a spot. Matsumura skipped Japan at the World Championship, and led his team to a 6–7 record, in 9th place overall.

== Personal life ==
Matsumura is employed as a market researcher for Nagayama Unsou. He is married.

== Grand Slam record ==
Key
| C | Champion |
| F | Lost in Final |
| SF | Lost in Semifinal |
| QF | Lost in Quarterfinals |
| R16 | Lost in the round of 16 |
| Q | Did not advance to playoffs |
| T2 | Played in Tier 2 event |
| DNP | Did not participate in event |
| N/A | Not a Grand Slam event that season |

| Event | 2018–19 | 2019–20 | 2020–21 | 2021–22 | 2022–23 | 2023–24 | 2024–25 |
|---|---|---|---|---|---|---|---|
| Tour Challenge | DNP | DNP | N/A | N/A | DNP | T2 | T2 |
| The National | DNP | Q | N/A | DNP | DNP | DNP | DNP |
| Masters | DNP | DNP | N/A | QF | DNP | DNP | DNP |
| Champions Cup | Q | N/A | DNP | DNP | DNP | N/A | N/A |
