= 2018–19 Curling World Cup – First Leg =

2018–19 Curling World Cup First Leg
- Host city: Suzhou, China
- Arena: Suzhou Olympic Sports Center
- Dates: September 12–16, 2018
- Women's winner: Canada
- Skip: Rachel Homan
- Third: Emma Miskew
- Second: Joanne Courtney
- Lead: Lisa Weagle
- Coach: Nolan Thiessen
- Finalist: Sweden (Hasselborg)
- Men's winner: Canada
- Skip: Kevin Koe
- Third: B. J. Neufeld
- Second: Colton Flasch
- Lead: Ben Hebert
- Coach: John Dunn
- Finalist: Norway (Walstad)
- Mixed doubles winner: Canada
- Female: Laura Walker
- Male: Kirk Muyres
- Coach: Nolan Thiessen
- Finalist: United States (Anderson/Dropkin)

The First Leg of the 2018–19 Curling World Cup took place from September 12 to 16, 2018 at the Suzhou Olympic Sports Center in Suzhou, China.

Canada had a clean sweep, winning all three disciplines. Rachel Homan's team beat out the Swedish Anna Hasselborg rink in the women's final, team Kevin Koe defeated Norway's Steffen Walstad in the men's event, and Laura Walker and Kirk Muyres beat out Sarah Anderson and Korey Dropkin from the United States for mixed doubles gold.

== Format ==
Curling World Cup matches have eight ends, rather than the standard ten ends. Ties after eight ends will be decided by a shoot-out, with each team throwing a stone and the one closest to the button winning. A win in eight or fewer ends will earn a team 3 points, a shoot-out win 2 points, a shoot-out less 1 point, and 0 points for a loss in eight or fewer ends.

Each event will have eight teams in the men's, women's, and mixed doubles tournament. The teams will be split into two groups of four, based on the Curling World Cup rankings, whereby the 1st, 3rd, 5th, and 7th, ranked teams will be in one group and the 2nd, 4th, 6th, and 8th ranked teams in the other. The first place teams in each group will play against each other in the final. In the event of a tie for first place, a shoot-out will be used, with the same format used to decide matches tied after eight ends.

== Qualification ==
For the first three legs of the Curling World Cup, the eight spots in the tournament are allocated to each of the hosting member associations, the highest ranked member association in each zone (the Americas, European, and Pacific-Asia), and two teams chosen by the World Curling Federation. Member associations may choose to send the same teams to all three legs or have different teams.

The following countries qualified for each discipline:

Qualification method	Women	Men	Mixed doubles
Hosting member association	China	China	China
Hosting member association	United States	United States	United States
Hosting member association	Sweden	Sweden	Sweden
Highest ranked member association in the Americas zone	Canada	Canada	Canada
Highest ranked member association in the European zone	Scotland	Switzerland	Switzerland
Highest ranked member association in the Pacific-Asia zone	South Korea	Japan	South Korea
Selected by World Curling Federation	Japan	Norway	Russia
Selected by World Curling Federation	Russia	Scotland	Norway

== Women ==
=== Teams ===
Canada	China	Japan	Russia
Skip: Rachel Homan; Third: Emma Miskew; Second: Joanne Courtney; Lead: Lisa Weagle	Fourth: Jiang Yilun; Skip: Liu Sijia; Second: Dong Ziqi; Lead: Jiang Xindi	Skip: Satsuki Fujisawa; Third: Chinami Yoshida; Second: Yumi Suzuki; Lead: Yurika Yoshida	Skip: Anna Sidorova; Third: Margarita Fomina; Second: Julia Portunova; Lead: Julia Guzieva
Scotland	South Korea	Sweden	United States
Skip: Jennifer Dodds; Third: Vicki Adams; Second: Vicky Wright; Lead: Lauren Gray	Skip: Kim Min-ji; Third: Kim Hye-rin; Second: Yang Tae-i; Lead: Kim Su-jin	Skip: Anna Hasselborg; Third: Sara McManus; Second: Agnes Knochenhauer; Lead: Sofia Mabergs	Skip: Nina Roth; Third: Tabitha Peterson; Second: Aileen Geving; Lead: Becca Hamilton

=== Round-robin standings ===
After Draw 15

Group A
Country	Skip	W	SOW	SOL	L	Pts
Sweden	Anna Hasselborg	5	0	0	1	15
Japan	Satsuki Fujisawa	3	0	0	3	9
China	Liu Sijia	2	0	0	4	6
Scotland	Jennifer Dodds	2	0	0	4	6

Group B
Country	Skip	W	SOW	SOL	L	Pts
Canada	Rachel Homan	5	0	0	1	15
Russia	Anna Sidorova	3	0	0	3	9
United States	Nina Roth	3	0	0	3	9
South Korea	Kim Min-ji	1	0	0	5	3

=== Round-robin results ===
==== Draw 1 ====
Wednesday, September 12, 15:00

Sheet A	1	2	3	4	5	6	7	8	Final
Sweden (Hasselborg)	0	3	0	2	1	0	0	X	6
China (Liu)	0	0	1	0	0	1	1	X	3

Sheet B	1	2	3	4	5	6	7	8	Final
Japan (Fujisawa)	1	0	0	0	1	0	2	1	5
Scotland (Dodds)	0	1	2	1	0	2	0	0	6

Sheet C	1	2	3	4	5	6	7	8	Final
Canada (Homan)	0	0	1	1	0	2	0	2	6
Russia (Sidorova)	1	1	0	0	1	0	2	0	5

Sheet D	1	2	3	4	5	6	7	8	Final
South Korea (Kim)	2	0	2	1	0	1	0	0	6
United States (Roth)	0	2	0	0	2	0	3	1	8

==== Draw 4 ====
Thursday, September 13, 08:30

Sheet E	1	2	3	4	5	6	7	8	Final
Sweden (Hasselborg)	1	2	0	0	2	0	2	X	7
Japan (Fujisawa)	0	0	1	1	0	2	0	X	4

==== Draw 5 ====
Thursday, September 13, 12:00

Sheet E	1	2	3	4	5	6	7	8	Final
China (Liu)	4	0	1	0	1	1	0	X	7
Scotland (Dodds)	0	2	0	1	0	0	1	X	4

==== Draw 6 ====
Thursday, September 13, 16:00

Sheet A	1	2	3	4	5	6	7	8	Final
Canada (Homan)	2	1	2	2	1	4	X	X	12
South Korea (Kim)	0	0	0	0	0	0	X	X	0

==== Draw 7 ====
Thursday, September 13, 19:30

Sheet A	1	2	3	4	5	6	7	8	Final
Russia (Sidorova)	1	1	0	0	0	0	1	X	3
United States (Roth)	0	0	1	4	1	2	0	X	8

==== Draw 8 ====
Friday, September 15, 08:30

Sheet C	1	2	3	4	5	6	7	8	Final
Japan (Fujisawa)	2	0	0	2	1	2	0	X	7
China (Liu)	0	1	0	0	0	0	1	X	2

Sheet D	1	2	3	4	5	6	7	8	Final
Scotland (Dodds)	0	0	1	0	2	0	1	0	4
Sweden (Hasselborg)	0	2	0	1	0	2	0	1	6

==== Draw 9 ====
Friday, September 15, 12:00

Sheet B	1	2	3	4	5	6	7	8	Final
South Korea (Kim)	0	0	1	0	0	0	X	X	1
Russia (Sidorova)	2	2	0	5	1	1	X	X	11

Sheet C	1	2	3	4	5	6	7	8	Final
United States (Roth)	0	0	1	0	0	X	X	X	1
Canada (Homan)	1	1	0	2	5	X	X	X	9

==== Draw 10 ====
Friday, September 15, 16:00

Sheet A	1	2	3	4	5	6	7	8	Final
China (Liu)	1	0	0	1	0	0	X	X	2
Sweden (Hasselborg)	0	2	4	0	1	2	X	X	9

Sheet B	1	2	3	4	5	6	7	8	Final
Scotland (Dodds)	0	0	0	2	0	0	3	X	5
Japan (Fujisawa)	0	1	1	0	1	4	0	X	7

==== Draw 11 ====
Friday, September 15, 19:30

Sheet B	1	2	3	4	5	6	7	8	Final
United States (Roth)	0	2	0	0	2	1	3	X	8
South Korea (Kim)	1	0	2	2	0	0	0	X	5

Sheet D	1	2	3	4	5	6	7	8	Final
Russia (Sidorova)	1	0	1	0	0	0	X	X	2
Canada (Homan)	0	2	0	1	3	2	X	X	8

==== Draw 12 ====
Saturday, September 16, 08:30

Sheet E	1	2	3	4	5	6	7	8	Final
Japan (Fujisawa)	1	2	0	1	0	2	1	X	7
Sweden (Hasselborg)	0	0	1	0	1	0	0	X	2

==== Draw 13 ====
Saturday, September 16, 12:00

Sheet A	1	2	3	4	5	6	7	8	Final
South Korea (Kim)	0	2	0	0	3	2	1	X	8
Canada (Homan)	1	0	1	0	0	0	0	X	2

Sheet D	1	2	3	4	5	6	7	8	Final
United States (Roth)	1	2	0	0	0	1	0	X	4
Russia (Sidorova)	0	0	1	2	3	0	2	X	8

Sheet E	1	2	3	4	5	6	7	8	Final
Scotland (Dodds)	0	3	0	2	1	4	X	X	10
China (Liu)	0	0	1	0	0	0	X	X	1

==== Draw 15 ====
Saturday, September 16, 19:30

Sheet B	1	2	3	4	5	6	7	8	Final
Canada (Homan)	1	0	0	2	2	2	1	X	8
United States (Roth)	0	0	2	0	0	0	0	X	2

Sheet C	1	2	3	4	5	6	7	8	Final
Sweden (Hasselborg)	0	2	2	0	2	2	X	X	8
Scotland (Dodds)	0	0	0	1	0	0	X	X	1

Sheet D	1	2	3	4	5	6	7	8	Final
China (Liu)	0	1	0	0	1	0	1	2	5
Japan (Fujisawa)	1	0	1	1	0	1	0	0	4

Sheet E	1	2	3	4	5	6	7	8	Final
Russia (Sidorova)	1	1	1	0	4	3	X	X	10
South Korea (Kim)	0	0	0	1	0	0	X	X	1

=== Final ===
Sunday, September 17, 12:00

Sheet C	1	2	3	4	5	6	7	8	Final
Canada (Homan)	0	2	1	0	1	0	0	3	7
Sweden (Hasselborg)	0	0	0	1	0	2	0	0	3

Player percentages
Canada		Sweden	
Lisa Weagle	69%	Sofia Mabergs	73%
Joanne Courtney	86%	Agnes Knochenhauer	89%
Emma Miskew	94%	Sara McManus	86%
Rachel Homan	83%	Anna Hasselborg	67%
Total	83%	Total	79%

== Men ==
=== Teams ===
Canada	China	Japan	Norway
Skip: Kevin Koe; Third: B. J. Neufeld; Second: Colton Flasch; Lead: Ben Hebert	Skip: Zang Jialiang; Third: Ba Dexin; Second: Ma Yanlong; Lead: Wang Jinbo	Fourth: Go Aoki; Skip: Masaki Iwai; Second: Ryotaro Shukuya; Lead: Kouki Ogiwara	Skip: Steffen Walstad; Third: Markus Høiberg; Second: Magnus Nedregotten; Lead: Magnus Vågberg
Scotland	Sweden	Switzerland	United States
Skip: Bruce Mouat; Third: Grant Hardie; Second: Bobby Lammie; Lead: Hammy McMillan Jr.	Skip: Niklas Edin; Third: Oskar Eriksson; Second: Rasmus Wranå; Lead: Christoffer Sundgren	Fourth: Benoît Schwarz; Third: Sven Michel; Skip: Peter de Cruz; Lead: Valentin Tanner	Fourth: Greg Persinger; Skip: Rich Ruohonen; Second: Sean Beighton; Lead: Kroy Nernberger

=== Round-robin standings ===
After Draw 15

Group A
Country	Skip	W	SOW	SOL	L	Pts
Norway	Steffen Walstad	5	0	0	1	15
Sweden	Niklas Edin	2	1	0	3	8
United States	Rich Ruohonen	2	0	1	3	7
China	Zang Jialiang	2	0	0	4	6

Group B
Country	Skip	W	SOW	SOL	L	Pts
Canada	Kevin Koe	5	0	0	1	15
Scotland	Bruce Mouat	4	0	0	2	12
Switzerland	Peter de Cruz	3	0	0	3	9
Japan	Masaki Iwai	0	0	0	6	0

=== Round-robin results ===
==== Draw 3 ====
Wednesday, September 12, 21:00

Sheet A	1	2	3	4	5	6	7	8	Final
Sweden (Edin)	0	1	0	1	1	0	0	0	3
United States (Ruohonen)	0	0	1	0	0	2	1	1	5

Sheet B	1	2	3	4	5	6	7	8	Final
Norway (Walstad)	0	1	2	1	0	0	0	X	4
China (Zang)	0	0	0	0	1	0	1	X	2

Sheet C	1	2	3	4	5	6	7	8	Final
Canada (Koe)	1	0	0	2	0	3	0	0	6
Switzerland (de Cruz)	0	0	2	0	1	0	0	1	4

Sheet D	1	2	3	4	5	6	7	8	Final
Scotland (Mouat)	1	2	1	0	3	2	X	X	9
Japan (Iwai)	0	0	0	1	0	0	X	X	1

==== Draw 5 ====
Thursday, September 13, 12:00

Sheet A	1	2	3	4	5	6	7	8	Final
Canada (Koe)	4	1	1	0	3	2	X	X	11
Scotland (Mouat)	0	0	0	1	0	0	X	X	1

Sheet B	1	2	3	4	5	6	7	8	Final
Switzerland (de Cruz)	2	1	1	0	4	2	X	X	10
Japan (Iwai)	0	0	0	1	0	0	X	X	1

Sheet C	1	2	3	4	5	6	7	8	Final
Sweden (Edin)	0	0	1	1	0	2	0	4	8
Norway (Walstad)	2	0	0	0	2	0	1	0	5

Sheet D	1	2	3	4	5	6	7	8	Final
United States (Ruohonen)	2	0	1	0	1	0	1	1	6
China (Zang)	0	2	0	1	0	2	0	0	5

==== Draw 7 ====
Thursday, September 13, 19:30

Sheet B	1	2	3	4	5	6	7	8	Final
Norway (Walstad)	2	1	2	3	1	0	X	X	9
United States (Ruohonen)	0	0	0	0	0	1	X	X	1

Sheet C	1	2	3	4	5	6	7	8	Final
Scotland (Mouat)	2	0	0	1	0	1	0	1	5
Switzerland (de Cruz)	0	2	0	0	1	0	1	0	4

Sheet D	1	2	3	4	5	6	7	8	Final
Japan (Iwai)	0	0	1	0	0	1	X	X	2
Canada (Koe)	3	2	0	2	1	0	X	X	8

Sheet E	1	2	3	4	5	6	7	8	Final
China (Zang)	2	1	1	1	0	2	X	X	7
Sweden (Edin)	0	0	0	0	2	0	X	X	2

==== Draw 9 ====
Friday, September 14, 12:00

Sheet A	1	2	3	4	5	6	7	8	9	Final
United States (Ruohonen)	2	0	2	0	2	0	0	2	0	8
Sweden (Edin)	0	3	0	2	0	2	1	0	1	9

Sheet D	1	2	3	4	5	6	7	8	Final
China (Zang)	0	0	1	0	0	2	0	X	3
Norway (Walstad)	1	2	0	0	1	0	3	X	7

==== Draw 10 ====
Friday, September 14, 16:00

Sheet C	1	2	3	4	5	6	7	8	Final
Switzerland (de Cruz)	0	0	1	0	0	2	1	0	4
Canada (Koe)	1	1	0	0	1	0	0	4	7

Sheet E	1	2	3	4	5	6	7	8	Final
Japan (Iwai)	1	0	1	0	0	0	X	X	2
Scotland (Mouat)	0	1	0	3	4	1	X	X	9

==== Draw 12 ====
Saturday, September 15, 08:30

Sheet A	1	2	3	4	5	6	7	8	Final
China (Zang)	0	0	0	1	1	0	2	1	5
United States (Ruohonen)	1	0	1	0	0	1	0	0	3

Sheet B	1	2	3	4	5	6	7	8	Final
Scotland (Mouat)	0	2	0	0	0	0	0	1	3
Canada (Koe)	1	0	0	0	0	0	0	0	1

Sheet C	1	2	3	4	5	6	7	8	Final
Norway (Walstad)	5	0	2	3	0	0	X	X	10
Sweden (Edin)	0	1	0	0	0	2	X	X	3

Sheet D	1	2	3	4	5	6	7	8	Final
Japan (Iwai)	0	0	0	1	0	2	0	X	3
Switzerland (de Cruz)	1	1	0	0	1	0	3	X	6

==== Draw 14 ====
Saturday, September 15, 16:00

Sheet A	1	2	3	4	5	6	7	8	Final
Canada (Koe)	3	0	5	4	0	0	X	X	12
Japan (Iwai)	0	2	0	0	1	1	X	X	4

Sheet B	1	2	3	4	5	6	7	8	Final
Sweden (Edin)	1	0	0	0	2	0	0	3	6
China (Zang)	0	1	0	1	0	1	1	0	4

Sheet E	1	2	3	4	5	6	7	8	Final
United States (Ruohonen)	0	2	0	1	0	0	X	X	3
Norway (Walstad)	3	0	2	0	2	2	X	X	9

==== Draw 15 ====
Saturday, September 15, 19:30

Sheet A	1	2	3	4	5	6	7	8	Final
Switzerland (de Cruz)	0	1	0	2	0	0	2	1	6
Scotland (Mouat)	0	0	3	0	0	2	0	0	5

=== Final ===
Sunday, September 17, 16:00

Sheet C	1	2	3	4	5	6	7	8	Final
Canada (Koe)	0	3	0	2	0	1	0	0	6
Norway (Walstad)	1	0	1	0	1	0	1	1	5

Player percentages
Canada		Norway	
Ben Hebert	92%	Magnus Vågberg	80%
Colton Flasch	86%	Magnus Nedregotten	77%
B. J. Neufeld	91%	Markus Høiberg	72%
Kevin Koe	89%	Steffen Walstad	73%
Total	89%	Total	75%

== Mixed doubles ==
=== Teams ===
Canada	China	Norway	Russia
Female: Laura Walker; Male: Kirk Muyres	Female: Yu Jiaxin; Male: Wang Xiangkun	Female: Kristin Skaslien; Male: Sander Rølvåg	Female: Maria Komarova; Male: Daniil Goriachev
South Korea	Sweden	Switzerland	United States
Female: Jang Hye-ri; Male: Choi Chi-won	Female: Therese Westman; Male: Robin Ahlberg	Female: Jenny Perret; Male: Martin Rios	Female: Sarah Anderson; Male: Korey Dropkin

=== Round-robin standings ===
After Draw 14

Group A
Country	Athletes	W	SOW	SOL	L	Pts
Canada	Laura Walker / Kirk Muyres	5	0	0	1	15
Norway	Kristin Skaslien / Sander Rølvåg	3	0	0	3	9
Russia	Maria Komarova / Daniil Goriachev	2	0	1	3	7
Sweden	Therese Westman / Robin Ahlberg	1	1	0	4	5

Group B
Country	Athletes	W	SOW	SOL	L	Pts
United States	Sarah Anderson / Korey Dropkin	6	0	0	0	18
Switzerland	Jenny Perret / Martin Rios	4	0	0	2	12
China	Yu Jiaxin / Wang Xiangkun	1	0	0	5	3
South Korea	Jang Hye-ri / Choi Chi-won	1	0	0	5	3

=== Round-robin results ===
==== Draw 2 ====
Wednesday, September 12, 18:30

Sheet A	1	2	3	4	5	6	7	8	Final
Canada (Walker/Muyres)	3	0	2	0	2	0	2	X	9
Norway (Skaslien/Rølvåg)	0	1	0	2	0	2	0	X	5

Sheet B	1	2	3	4	5	6	7	8	9	Final
Russia (Komarova/Goriachev)	1	1	1	0	0	0	3	0	0	6
Sweden (Westman/Ahlberg)	0	0	0	3	1	1	0	1	1	7

Sheet C	1	2	3	4	5	6	7	8	Final
Switzerland (Perret/Rios)	4	1	3	0	1	2	1	X	12
China (Yu/Wang)	0	0	0	1	0	0	0	X	1

Sheet D	1	2	3	4	5	6	7	8	Final
South Korea (Jang/Choi)	0	0	1	0	0	0	X	X	1
United States (Anderson/Dropkin)	4	2	0	1	1	2	X	X	10

==== Draw 4 ====
Thursday, September 13, 08:30

Sheet A	1	2	3	4	5	6	7	8	Final
Switzerland (Perret/Rios)	0	3	3	2	2	1	X	X	11
South Korea (Jang/Choi)	1	0	0	0	0	0	X	X	1

Sheet B	1	2	3	4	5	6	7	8	Final
China (Yu/Wang)	1	0	0	0	0	1	0	X	2
United States (Anderson/Dropkin)	0	4	1	1	1	0	2	X	9

Sheet C	1	2	3	4	5	6	7	8	Final
Canada (Walker/Muyres)	2	1	1	0	1	1	3	X	9
Russia (Komarova/Goriachev)	0	0	0	1	0	0	0	X	1

Sheet D	1	2	3	4	5	6	7	8	Final
Norway (Skaslien/Rølvåg)	2	0	2	0	0	4	0	X	8
Sweden (Westman/Ahlberg)	0	1	0	1	1	0	1	X	4

==== Draw 6 ====
Thursday, September 13, 16:00

Sheet B	1	2	3	4	5	6	7	8	Final
United States (Anderson/Dropkin)	3	2	0	0	1	1	3	X	10
Switzerland (Perret/Rios)	0	0	1	3	0	0	0	X	4

Sheet C	1	2	3	4	5	6	7	8	Final
Russia (Komarova/Goriachev)	1	0	2	3	0	3	0	1	10
Norway (Skaslien/Rølvåg)	0	3	0	0	2	0	4	0	9

Sheet D	1	2	3	4	5	6	7	8	Final
Sweden (Westman/Ahlberg)	0	0	2	0	0	0	X	X	2
Canada (Walker/Muyres)	2	1	0	2	2	1	X	X	8

Sheet E	1	2	3	4	5	6	7	8	Final
South Korea (Jang/Choi)	2	0	0	3	0	0	X	X	5
China (Yu/Wang)	0	2	1	0	5	3	X	X	11

==== Draw 8 ====
Friday, September 14, 08:30

Sheet A	1	2	3	4	5	6	7	8	Final
Norway (Skaslien/Rølvåg)	1	2	0	1	1	0	3	0	8
Canada (Walker/Muyres)	0	0	1	0	0	3	0	1	5

Sheet B	1	2	3	4	5	6	7	8	Final
Sweden (Westman/Ahlberg)	0	2	0	0	0	0	X	X	2
Russia (Komarova/Goriachev)	1	0	2	3	2	1	X	X	9

Sheet E	1	2	3	4	5	6	7	8	Final
United States (Anderson/Dropkin)	6	0	4	2	2	0	4	X	18
South Korea (Jang/Choi)	0	3	0	0	0	1	0	X	4

==== Draw 9 ====
Friday, September 14, 12:00

Sheet E	1	2	3	4	5	6	7	8	Final
China (Yu/Wang)	0	3	0	1	1	0	0	X	5
Switzerland (Perret/Rios)	4	0	3	0	0	1	2	X	10

==== Draw 10 ====
Friday, September 14, 16:00

Sheet D	1	2	3	4	5	6	7	8	Final
Russia (Komarova/Goriachev)	1	0	1	0	0	0	1	X	3
Canada (Walker/Muyres)	0	1	0	3	1	1	0	X	6

==== Draw 11 ====
Friday, September 14, 19:30

Sheet A	1	2	3	4	5	6	7	8	Final
United States (Anderson/Dropkin)	2	1	1	0	3	0	2	X	9
China (Yu/Wang)	0	0	0	1	0	1	0	X	2

Sheet C	1	2	3	4	5	6	7	8	Final
South Korea (Jang/Choi)	1	2	1	0	1	0	0	0	5
Switzerland (Perret/Rios)	0	0	0	2	0	3	1	2	8

Sheet E	1	2	3	4	5	6	7	8	Final
Sweden (Westman/Ahlberg)	0	0	0	2	0	2	2	1	7
Norway (Skaslien/Rølvåg)	1	2	2	0	1	0	0	0	6

==== Draw 13 ====
Saturday, September 15, 12:00

Sheet B	1	2	3	4	5	6	7	8	Final
Canada (Walker/Muyres)	0	3	0	1	1	2	1	X	8
Sweden (Westman/Ahlberg)	3	0	1	0	0	0	0	X	4

Sheet C	1	2	3	4	5	6	7	8	Final
Norway (Jang/Choi)	1	0	3	1	0	1	0	X	6
Russia (Komarova/Goriachev)	0	1	0	0	1	0	1	X	3

==== Draw 14 ====
Saturday, September 15, 16:00

Sheet C	1	2	3	4	5	6	7	8	Final
Switzerland (Perret/Rios)	2	0	1	0	0	0	1	0	4
United States (Anderson/Dropkin)	0	1	0	1	1	1	0	1	5

Sheet D	1	2	3	4	5	6	7	8	Final
China (Yu/Wang)	1	1	0	0	1	0	0	0	3
South Korea (Jang/Choi)	0	0	1	1	0	1	3	1	7

=== Final ===
Sunday, September 16, 08:30

Sheet C	1	2	3	4	5	6	7	8	Final
United States (Anderson/Dropkin)	2	0	1	0	0	0	0	X	3
Canada (Walker/Muyres)	0	1	0	1	3	1	1	X	7

Player percentages
United States		Canada	
Sarah Anderson	77%	Laura Walker	83%
Korey Dropkin	69%	Kirk Muyres	90%
Total	72%	Total	88%
