= 2019 Pacific-Asia Curling Championships =

- Host city: Shenzhen, China
- Arena: Shenzhen Universiade Sports Center
- Dates: November 2–9
- Men's winner: South Korea
- Skip: Kim Chang-min
- Third: Lee Ki-jeong
- Second: Kim Hak-kyun
- Lead: Lee Ki-bok
- Coach: Lim Myung-sup
- Finalist: Japan (Matsumura)
- Women's winner: China
- Skip: Han Yu
- Third: Zhang Lijun
- Second: Jiang Xindi
- Lead: Zhao Ruiyi
- Alternate: Yu Jiaxin
- Coach: Marco Mariani, Sören Grahn
- Finalist: Japan (Nakajima)

The 2019 Pacific-Asia Curling Championships was held from November 2 to 9 at the Shenzhen Universiade Sports Center in Shenzhen, China. The top men's team and the top two women's teams qualified for the 2020 World Men's Curling Championship and 2020 World Women's Curling Championship respectively. The next two placed teams of each gender qualified for the World Qualification Event, a chance to qualify for the World Curling Championships.

== Medalists ==
	Gold	Silver	Bronze
Men	South Korea; Kim Chang-min; Lee Ki-jeong; Kim Hak-kyun; Lee Ki-bok	Japan; Yuta Matsumura; Tetsuro Shimizu; Yasumasa Tanida; Kosuke Aita; Shinya Abe	China; Zou Qiang; Wang Zhiyu; Tian Jiafeng; Xu Jingtao; Han Peng
Women	China; Han Yu; Zhang Lijun; Jiang Xindi; Zhao Ruiyi; Yu Jiaxin	Japan; Ikue Kitazawa (Fourth); Chiaki Matsumura; Seina Nakajima (Skip); Hasumi Ishigooka; Emi Shimizu	South Korea; Gim Un-chi; Um Min-ji; Kim Su-ji; Seol Ye-eun; Seol Ye-ji

== Men ==
=== Teams ===
The teams are listed as follows:

Australia	China	Hong Kong	Japan	Kazakhstan
Fourth: Dean Hewitt; Skip: Sean Hall; Second: Tanner Davis; Lead: Jay Merchant; Alternate: Matthew Millikin	Skip: Zou Qiang; Third: Wang Zhiyu; Second: Tian Jiafeng; Lead: Xu Jingtao; Alternate: Han Peng	Skip: Jason Chang; Third: Justin Chen; Second: Martin Yan; Lead: Woody Cheng; Alternate: Kelvin Cheung	Skip: Yuta Matsumura; Third: Tetsuro Shimizu; Second: Yasumasa Tanida; Lead: Kosuke Aita; Alternate: Shinya Abe	Skip: Abylaikhan Zhuzbay; Third: Azizbek Nadirbayev; Second: Madiyar Korabayev; Lead: Aidos Alliyar; Alternate: Nikita Shishkin
South Korea	New Zealand	Nigeria	Qatar	Chinese Taipei
Skip: Kim Chang-min; Third: Lee Ki-jeong; Second: Kim Hak-kyun; Lead: Lee Ki-bok	Skip: Scott Becker; Third: Anton Hood; Second: Brett Sargon; Lead: Warren Dobson	Skip: Harold Woods III; Third: Tijani Cole; Second: Fabian Contreras	Skip: Nasser Alyafei; Third: Ahmed Saad Al-Fahad; Second: Salem Ali; Lead: Abdulrahman Ali Mohsen; Alternate: Mouaaz Mlis	Skip: Randolph Shen; Third: Nicholas Hsu; Second: Ken Hsu; Lead: Victor Lee

=== Round-robin standings ===
Final round-robin standings

Key
Teams to Playoffs

Country	Skip	W	L
South Korea	Kim Chang-min	9	0
Japan	Yuta Matsumura	8	1
China	Zou Qiang	7	2
New Zealand	Scott Becker	6	3
Chinese Taipei	Randolph Shen	5	4
Australia	Sean Hall	4	5
Qatar	Nasser Alyafei	3	6
Kazakhstan	Abylaikhan Zhuzbay	2	7
Hong Kong	Jason Chang	1	8
Nigeria	Harold Woods III	0	9

=== Round-robin results ===
All draw times are listed in China Standard Time (UTC+08:00).

==== Draw 1 ====
Saturday, November 2, 14:00

Sheet A	1	2	3	4	5	6	7	8	9	10	Final
Hong Kong (Chang)	1	0	0	0	0	0	0	0	0	X	1
Chinese Taipei (Shen) 🔨	0	3	1	0	2	1	1	2	2	X	12

Sheet B	1	2	3	4	5	6	7	8	9	10	Final
South Korea (Kim) 🔨	4	1	2	3	3	2	1	X	X	X	16
Qatar (Alyafei)	0	0	0	0	0	0	0	X	X	X	0

Sheet C	1	2	3	4	5	6	7	8	9	10	Final
Kazakhstan (Zhuzbay) 🔨	3	0	3	0	0	4	0	0	3	X	13
Nigeria (Woods)	0	1	0	1	2	0	1	1	0	X	6

Sheet D	1	2	3	4	5	6	7	8	9	10	Final
Japan (Matsumura) 🔨	1	0	2	0	2	0	2	1	0	X	8
Australia (Hall)	0	1	0	1	0	2	0	0	1	X	5

Sheet E	1	2	3	4	5	6	7	8	9	10	Final
China (Zou)	1	1	1	0	3	0	2	2	X	X	10
New Zealand (Becker) 🔨	0	0	0	2	0	2	0	0	X	X	4

==== Draw 2 ====
Sunday, November 3, 09:00

Sheet A	1	2	3	4	5	6	7	8	9	10	Final
Qatar (Alyafei)	0	0	2	2	0	1	1	0	1	0	7
Kazakhstan (Zhuzbay) 🔨	1	1	0	0	2	0	0	1	0	1	6

Sheet B	1	2	3	4	5	6	7	8	9	10	Final
Chinese Taipei (Shen) 🔨	0	3	2	2	1	2	0	0	0	X	10
Nigeria (Woods)	1	0	0	0	0	0	0	1	2	X	4

Sheet C	1	2	3	4	5	6	7	8	9	10	Final
New Zealand (Becker) 🔨	0	0	3	0	1	2	1	2	X	X	9
Australia (Hall)	0	1	0	2	0	0	0	0	X	X	3

Sheet D	1	2	3	4	5	6	7	8	9	10	Final
China (Zou)	0	1	0	3	0	4	0	4	0	X	12
Hong Kong (Chang) 🔨	1	0	1	0	1	0	3	0	1	X	7

Sheet E	1	2	3	4	5	6	7	8	9	10	Final
South Korea (Kim) 🔨	1	0	2	0	0	2	0	0	0	3	8
Japan (Matsumura)	0	2	0	0	1	0	2	1	0	0	6

==== Draw 3 ====
Sunday, November 3, 19:00

Sheet A	1	2	3	4	5	6	7	8	9	10	Final
Nigeria (Woods)	0	0	0	0	0	0	0	X	X	X	0
China (Zou) 🔨	5	3	3	0	3	1	1	X	X	X	16

Sheet B	1	2	3	4	5	6	7	8	9	10	Final
Japan (Matsumura) 🔨	0	1	1	1	1	0	1	0	2	X	7
Kazakhstan (Zhuzbay)	2	0	0	0	0	1	0	2	0	X	5

Sheet C	1	2	3	4	5	6	7	8	9	10	Final
Australia (Hall)	0	1	2	0	2	0	0	3	0	0	8
Hong Kong (Chang) 🔨	1	0	0	2	0	0	1	0	2	1	7

Sheet D	1	2	3	4	5	6	7	8	9	10	Final
New Zealand (Becker)	2	5	0	5	2	1	X	X	X	X	15
Qatar (Alyafei) 🔨	0	0	1	0	0	0	X	X	X	X	1

Sheet E	1	2	3	4	5	6	7	8	9	10	Final
Chinese Taipei (Shen)	0	1	0	0	0	0	X	X	X	X	1
South Korea (Kim) 🔨	2	0	2	2	2	1	X	X	X	X	9

==== Draw 4 ====
Monday, November 4, 14:00

Sheet A	1	2	3	4	5	6	7	8	9	10	Final
Japan (Matsumura) 🔨	5	0	4	0	0	3	0	1	X	X	13
Qatar (Alyafei)	0	1	0	1	0	0	1	0	X	X	3

Sheet B	1	2	3	4	5	6	7	8	9	10	Final
China (Zou)	2	0	3	5	1	3	0	2	X	X	16
Chinese Taipei (Shen) 🔨	0	0	0	0	0	0	2	0	X	X	2

Sheet C	1	2	3	4	5	6	7	8	9	10	Final
South Korea (Kim)	0	3	2	1	0	2	X	X	X	X	8
New Zealand (Becker) 🔨	1	0	0	0	1	0	X	X	X	X	2

Sheet D	1	2	3	4	5	6	7	8	9	10	Final
Hong Kong (Chang) 🔨	3	2	4	0	1	0	0	0	2	X	12
Nigeria (Woods)	0	0	0	2	0	1	0	1	0	X	4

Sheet E	1	2	3	4	5	6	7	8	9	10	Final
Kazakhstan (Zhuzbay)	0	1	0	0	2	0	1	0	0	X	4
Australia (Hall) 🔨	1	0	1	3	0	1	0	1	5	X	12

==== Draw 5 ====
Tuesday, November 5, 09:00

Sheet A	1	2	3	4	5	6	7	8	9	10	Final
China (Zou) 🔨	2	0	3	1	0	1	1	0	2	X	10
Australia (Hall)	0	1	0	0	1	0	0	3	0	X	5

Sheet B	1	2	3	4	5	6	7	8	9	10	Final
Qatar (Alyafei) 🔨	0	1	2	0	0	2	0	2	0	1	8
Hong Kong (Chang)	0	0	0	3	1	0	1	0	0	0	5

Sheet C	1	2	3	4	5	6	7	8	9	10	Final
Nigeria (Woods)	0	0	0	0	0	0	0	X	X	X	0
Japan (Matsumura) 🔨	5	2	2	2	4	3	3	X	X	X	21

Sheet D	1	2	3	4	5	6	7	8	9	10	Final
Kazakhstan (Zhuzbay)	0	3	0	1	0	1	0	0	X	X	5
South Korea (Kim) 🔨	1	0	3	0	2	0	3	1	X	X	10

Sheet E	1	2	3	4	5	6	7	8	9	10	Final
New Zealand (Becker) 🔨	3	0	0	1	0	0	0	2	0	2	8
Chinese Taipei (Shen)	0	1	3	0	1	0	0	0	2	0	7

==== Draw 6 ====
Tuesday, November 5, 19:00

Sheet A	1	2	3	4	5	6	7	8	9	10	Final
South Korea (Kim) 🔨	7	3	4	0	6	4	0	X	X	X	24
Nigeria (Woods)	0	0	0	1	0	0	1	X	X	X	2

Sheet B	1	2	3	4	5	6	7	8	9	10	Final
New Zealand (Becker) 🔨	1	0	0	0	1	0	3	0	2	0	7
Japan (Matsumura)	0	2	0	1	0	3	0	1	0	1	8

Sheet C	1	2	3	4	5	6	7	8	9	10	Final
China (Zou) 🔨	4	0	4	0	2	0	2	0	X	X	12
Qatar (Alyafei)	0	1	0	1	0	1	0	1	X	X	4

Sheet D	1	2	3	4	5	6	7	8	9	10	Final
Australia (Hall)	0	0	0	0	0	1	0	X	X	X	1
Chinese Taipei (Shen) 🔨	2	2	1	1	1	0	1	X	X	X	8

Sheet E	1	2	3	4	5	6	7	8	9	10	Final
Hong Kong (Chang) 🔨	0	0	1	1	0	1	0	0	2	0	5
Kazakhstan (Zhuzbay)	1	2	0	0	1	0	1	1	0	2	8

==== Draw 7 ====
Wednesday, November 6, 09:00

Sheet A	1	2	3	4	5	6	7	8	9	10	Final
Chinese Taipei (Shen) 🔨	1	0	0	0	1	2	0	1	0	0	5
Japan (Matsumura)	0	1	0	0	0	0	2	0	2	1	6

Sheet B	1	2	3	4	5	6	7	8	9	10	Final
Kazakhstan (Zhuzbay)	0	0	0	1	0	0	0	X	X	X	1
China (Zou) 🔨	2	4	1	0	0	3	3	X	X	X	13

Sheet C	1	2	3	4	5	6	7	8	9	10	Final
Hong Kong (Chang)	0	1	0	0	2	0	0	X	X	X	3
South Korea (Kim) 🔨	4	0	2	4	0	2	3	X	X	X	15

Sheet D	1	2	3	4	5	6	7	8	9	10	Final
Nigeria (Woods)	1	0	0	0	2	0	0	0	X	X	3
New Zealand (Becker) 🔨	0	4	3	5	0	3	2	1	X	X	18

Sheet E	1	2	3	4	5	6	7	8	9	10	Final
Australia (Hall) 🔨	3	0	2	0	1	0	4	X	X	X	10
Qatar (Alyafei)	0	1	0	1	0	1	0	X	X	X	3

==== Draw 8 ====
Wednesday, November 6, 19:00

Sheet A	1	2	3	4	5	6	7	8	9	10	Final
Australia (Hall)	1	0	2	0	0	1	1	0	0	0	5
South Korea (Kim) 🔨	0	2	0	1	0	0	0	2	1	1	7

Sheet B	1	2	3	4	5	6	7	8	9	10	Final
Hong Kong (Chang) 🔨	1	0	1	0	0	1	0	1	X	X	4
New Zealand (Becker)	0	3	0	2	3	0	6	0	X	X	14

Sheet C	1	2	3	4	5	6	7	8	9	10	Final
Japan (Matsumura) 🔨	2	0	2	0	0	0	2	0	1	1	8
China (Zou)	0	1	0	3	0	1	0	2	0	0	7

Sheet D	1	2	3	4	5	6	7	8	9	10	Final
Chinese Taipei (Shen) 🔨	1	1	1	0	1	0	1	0	0	2	7
Kazakhstan (Zhuzbay)	0	0	0	1	0	3	0	0	1	0	5

Sheet E	1	2	3	4	5	6	7	8	9	10	Final
Qatar (Alyafei)	2	1	2	0	0	2	0	4	3	X	14
Nigeria (Woods) 🔨	0	0	0	1	1	0	1	0	0	X	3

==== Draw 9 ====
Thursday, November 7, 14:00

Sheet A	1	2	3	4	5	6	7	8	9	10	Final
Kazakhstan (Zhuzbay)	0	0	1	1	0	2	0	0	X	X	4
New Zealand (Becker) 🔨	3	3	0	0	4	0	0	1	X	X	11

Sheet B	1	2	3	4	5	6	7	8	9	10	Final
Nigeria (Woods)	0	0	0	0	1	0	0	0	X	X	1
Australia (Hall) 🔨	5	4	3	4	0	1	1	1	X	X	19

Sheet C	1	2	3	4	5	6	7	8	9	10	Final
Qatar (Alyafei)	0	0	1	0	0	0	1	0	0	X	2
Chinese Taipei (Shen) 🔨	0	3	0	2	1	0	0	0	4	X	10

Sheet D	1	2	3	4	5	6	7	8	9	10	Final
South Korea (Kim) 🔨	2	3	0	0	1	0	5	X	X	X	11
China (Zou)	0	0	1	0	0	0	0	X	X	X	1

Sheet E	1	2	3	4	5	6	7	8	9	10	Final
Japan (Matsumura) 🔨	4	0	0	0	4	0	0	5	X	X	13
Hong Kong (Chang)	0	0	0	1	0	1	0	0	X	X	2

=== Playoffs ===
Semifinals
1	South Korea	10
4	New Zealand	6
2	Japan	7
3	China	5

Gold-medal game
1	South Korea	11
2	Japan	2

Bronze-medal game
4	New Zealand	4
3	China	9

==== Semifinals ====
Friday, November 8, 09:00

Sheet D	1	2	3	4	5	6	7	8	9	10	Final
South Korea (Kim) 🔨	1	1	0	0	2	0	3	0	3	X	10
New Zealand (Becker)	0	0	2	1	0	1	0	2	0	X	6

Friday, November 8, 14:00

Sheet C	1	2	3	4	5	6	7	8	9	10	Final
Japan (Matsumura) 🔨	1	0	2	2	0	0	0	1	0	1	7
China (Zou)	0	2	0	0	1	0	0	0	2	0	5

==== Bronze-medal game ====
Saturday, November 9, 10:00

Sheet D	1	2	3	4	5	6	7	8	9	10	Final
New Zealand (Becker)	0	0	1	0	0	0	1	2	X	X	4
China (Zou) 🔨	4	1	0	1	2	1	0	0	X	X	9

==== Gold-medal game ====
Saturday, November 9, 14:00

Sheet C	1	2	3	4	5	6	7	8	9	10	Final
South Korea (Kim) 🔨	0	0	2	1	2	0	4	2	X	X	11
Japan (Matsumura)	0	0	0	0	0	2	0	0	X	X	2

== Women ==
=== Teams ===
The teams are listed as follows:

Australia	China	Hong Kong	Japan
Skip: Lauren Wagner; Third: Jennifer Westhagen; Second: Kristen Tsourlenes; Lead: Carlee Millikin	Skip: Han Yu; Third: Zhang Lijun; Second: Jiang Xindi; Lead: Zhao Ruiyi; Alternate: Yu Jiaxin	Skip: Ling-Yue Hung; Third: Ada Shang; Second: Ashura Wong; Lead: On Na Anna Ngai; Alternate: Pianpian Hu	Fourth: Ikue Kitazawa; Third: Chiaki Matsumura; Skip: Seina Nakajima; Lead: Hasumi Ishigooka; Alternate: Emi Shimizu
Kazakhstan	South Korea	Qatar	Chinese Taipei
Skip: Sitora Alliyarova; Third: Anastassiya Spirikova; Second: Angelina Ebauyer; Lead: Yekaterina Kolykhalova; Alternate: Tilsimay Alliyarova	Skip: Gim Un-chi; Third: Um Min-ji; Second: Kim Su-ji; Lead: Seol Ye-eun; Alternate: Seol Ye-ji	Skip: Mubarkah Al-Abdulla; Third: Maryam Binali; Second: Sara Al-Qaet; Lead: Amna Al-Qaet; Alternate: Kholoud Al-Mukdad	Skip: Heidi Lin; Third: Amanda Chou; Second: Stephanie Lee; Lead: Ko Yang; Alternate: I-Ling Liu

=== Round-robin standings ===
Final round-robin standings

Key
Teams to Playoffs

Country	Skip	W	L	W–L	DSC
Japan	Seina Nakajima	6	1	1–1	34.00
South Korea	Gim Un-chi	6	1	1–1	36.53
China	Han Yu	6	1	1–1	71.40
Hong Kong	Ling-Yue Hung	3	4	1–0	
Chinese Taipei	Heidi Lin	3	4	0–1	
Australia	Lauren Wagner	2	5	1–0	
Kazakhstan	Sitora Alliyarova	2	5	0–1	
Qatar	Mubarkah Al-Abdulla	0	7	–	

=== Round-robin results ===
All draw times are listed in China Standard Time (UTC+08:00).

==== Draw 1 ====
Saturday, November 2, 19:00

Sheet B	1	2	3	4	5	6	7	8	9	10	Final
Japan (Nakajima)	0	1	1	0	0	1	0	0	2	1	6
South Korea (Gim) 🔨	1	0	0	1	0	0	2	1	0	0	5

Sheet C	1	2	3	4	5	6	7	8	9	10	Final
China (Han)	2	1	0	1	3	0	1	4	X	X	12
Hong Kong (Hung) 🔨	0	0	2	0	0	2	0	0	X	X	4

Sheet D	1	2	3	4	5	6	7	8	9	10	Final
Kazakhstan (Alliyarova)	1	0	1	0	3	4	0	2	0	0	11
Chinese Taipei (Lin) 🔨	0	1	0	3	0	0	5	0	2	1	12

Sheet E	1	2	3	4	5	6	7	8	9	10	Final
Australia (Wagner) 🔨	0	3	2	0	0	2	2	1	2	X	12
Qatar (Al-Abdulla)	1	0	0	1	1	0	0	0	0	X	3

==== Draw 2 ====
Sunday, November 3, 14:00

Sheet A	1	2	3	4	5	6	7	8	9	10	Final
Chinese Taipei (Lin)	0	2	0	0	2	0	1	0	X	X	5
Japan (Nakajima) 🔨	3	0	3	1	0	2	0	5	X	X	14

Sheet B	1	2	3	4	5	6	7	8	9	10	Final
Hong Kong (Hung)	2	0	5	0	1	1	0	0	0	0	9
Australia (Wagner) 🔨	0	1	0	2	0	0	1	2	1	1	8

Sheet C	1	2	3	4	5	6	7	8	9	10	Final
Qatar (Al-Abdulla)	0	1	0	0	0	0	X	X	X	X	1
China (Han) 🔨	7	0	1	3	5	3	X	X	X	X	19

Sheet D	1	2	3	4	5	6	7	8	9	10	Final
South Korea (Gim)	0	3	1	1	0	7	X	X	X	X	12
Kazakhstan (Alliyarova) 🔨	1	0	0	0	1	0	X	X	X	X	2

==== Draw 3 ====
Monday, November 4, 09:00

Sheet B	1	2	3	4	5	6	7	8	9	10	Final
Kazakhstan (Alliyarova) 🔨	0	0	1	2	3	0	1	1	1	0	9
Hong Kong (Hung)	1	1	0	0	0	1	0	0	0	1	4

Sheet C	1	2	3	4	5	6	7	8	9	10	Final
Chinese Taipei (Lin) 🔨	0	0	0	0	1	0	0	3	4	1	9
Qatar (Al-Abdulla)	1	3	1	1	0	1	1	0	0	0	8

Sheet D	1	2	3	4	5	6	7	8	9	10	Final
Australia (Wagner)	1	0	0	1	0	2	0	1	0	X	5
South Korea (Gim) 🔨	0	2	1	0	2	0	4	0	1	X	10

Sheet E	1	2	3	4	5	6	7	8	9	10	Final
China (Han) 🔨	0	1	0	1	1	1	1	0	0	2	7
Japan (Nakajima)	1	0	1	0	0	0	0	2	2	0	6

==== Draw 4 ====
Monday, November 4, 19:00

Sheet A	1	2	3	4	5	6	7	8	9	10	Final
Hong Kong (Hung)	1	0	0	3	0	1	2	1	0	1	9
Chinese Taipei (Lin) 🔨	0	1	3	0	2	0	0	0	1	0	7

Sheet B	1	2	3	4	5	6	7	8	9	10	Final
Qatar (Al-Abdulla)	0	0	0	0	1	1	4	0	X	X	6
Kazakhstan (Alliyarova) 🔨	4	1	2	3	0	0	0	5	X	X	15

Sheet C	1	2	3	4	5	6	7	8	9	10	Final
Japan (Nakajima) 🔨	3	1	0	3	4	0	4	X	X	X	15
Australia (Wagner)	0	0	1	0	0	1	0	X	X	X	2

Sheet E	1	2	3	4	5	6	7	8	9	10	11	Final
South Korea (Gim)	0	0	1	0	3	1	0	0	1	0	1	7
China (Han) 🔨	0	1	0	1	0	0	1	2	0	1	0	6

==== Draw 5 ====
Tuesday, November 5, 14:00

Sheet B	1	2	3	4	5	6	7	8	9	10	Final
China (Han)	0	2	3	1	3	1	X	X	X	X	10
Chinese Taipei (Lin) 🔨	1	0	0	0	0	0	X	X	X	X	1

Sheet C	1	2	3	4	5	6	7	8	9	10	Final
Hong Kong (Hung)	0	1	0	0	0	0	0	0	X	X	1
South Korea (Gim) 🔨	2	0	1	1	2	1	1	1	X	X	9

Sheet D	1	2	3	4	5	6	7	8	9	10	Final
Japan (Nakajima) 🔨	3	4	1	4	6	3	X	X	X	X	21
Qatar (Al-Abdulla)	0	0	0	0	0	0	X	X	X	X	0

Sheet E	1	2	3	4	5	6	7	8	9	10	Final
Kazakhstan (Alliyarova) 🔨	2	1	0	0	0	0	1	0	X	X	4
Australia (Wagner)	0	0	2	2	4	3	0	1	X	X	12

==== Draw 6 ====
Wednesday, November 6, 14:00

Sheet A	1	2	3	4	5	6	7	8	9	10	Final
China (Han) 🔨	7	0	6	1	0	3	X	X	X	X	17
Kazakhstan (Alliyarova)	0	1	0	0	1	0	X	X	X	X	2

Sheet B	1	2	3	4	5	6	7	8	9	10	Final
South Korea (Gim) 🔨	7	6	2	2	1	2	X	X	X	X	20
Qatar (Al-Abdulla)	0	0	0	0	0	0	X	X	X	X	0

Sheet C	1	2	3	4	5	6	7	8	9	10	Final
Australia (Wagner)	0	0	0	0	0	0	X	X	X	X	0
Chinese Taipei (Lin) 🔨	1	1	1	2	2	6	X	X	X	X	13

Sheet E	1	2	3	4	5	6	7	8	9	10	Final
Japan (Nakajima) 🔨	1	2	4	0	3	2	3	X	X	X	15
Hong Kong (Hung)	0	0	0	1	0	0	0	X	X	X	1

==== Draw 7 ====
Thursday, November 7, 09:00

Sheet B	1	2	3	4	5	6	7	8	9	10	Final
Australia (Wagner) 🔨	0	1	0	1	0	0	0	0	0	X	2
China (Han)	1	0	2	0	2	2	2	1	1	X	11

Sheet C	1	2	3	4	5	6	7	8	9	10	Final
Kazakhstan (Alliyarova)	0	0	0	0	0	0	X	X	X	X	0
Japan (Nakajima) 🔨	2	2	2	1	4	0	X	X	X	X	11

Sheet D	1	2	3	4	5	6	7	8	9	10	Final
Qatar (Al-Abdulla) 🔨	2	0	0	0	1	1	X	X	X	X	4
Hong Kong (Hung)	0	4	3	3	0	0	X	X	X	X	10

Sheet E	1	2	3	4	5	6	7	8	9	10	Final
Chinese Taipei (Lin)	0	0	1	0	1	0	X	X	X	X	2
South Korea (Gim) 🔨	4	2	0	4	0	4	X	X	X	X	14

=== Playoffs ===
Semifinals
1	Japan	12
4	Hong Kong	5
2	South Korea	2
3	China	8

Gold-medal game
1	Japan	3
3	China	10

Bronze-medal game
4	Hong Kong	2
2	South Korea	13

==== Semifinals ====
Thursday, November 7, 19:00

Sheet C	1	2	3	4	5	6	7	8	9	10	Final
Japan (Nakajima) 🔨	3	0	0	3	1	1	4	0	X	X	12
Hong Kong (Hung)	0	2	2	0	0	0	0	1	X	X	5

Friday, November 8, 09:00

Sheet C	1	2	3	4	5	6	7	8	9	10	Final
South Korea (Gim) 🔨	0	1	0	0	0	1	0	0	0	X	2
China (Han)	1	0	0	1	2	0	1	1	2	X	8

==== Bronze-medal game ====
Friday, November 8, 19:00

Sheet C	1	2	3	4	5	6	7	8	9	10	Final
Hong Kong (Hung)	0	1	0	0	1	0	0	0	X	X	2
South Korea (Gim) 🔨	2	0	1	4	0	3	1	2	X	X	13

==== Gold-medal game ====
Saturday, November 9, 10:00

Sheet C	1	2	3	4	5	6	7	8	9	10	Final
Japan (Nakajima)	0	0	1	0	0	1	0	1	X	X	3
China (Han) 🔨	2	2	0	2	2	0	2	0	X	X	10
