= Yao Mingyue =

Chinese curler

- Curler
- Born: Yao Mingyue; March 9, 1993 (age 33)

Team
- Curling club: Harbin CC, Harbin, Heilongjiang

Curling career
- Member Association: China
- World Championship: 2 (2018, 2019)
- Pacific-Asia Championship: 1 (2017)
Medal record
Women's curling
Representing China
Pacific-Asia Curling Championships
Bronze medal – third place	2017 Erina
Pacific-Asia Junior Curling Championships
Silver medal – second place	2014 Harbin
Silver medal – second place	2013 Kitami
Bronze medal – third place	2012 Jeonju City

Yao Mingyue (born March 9, 1993) is a Chinese curler.

== Career ==
=== Juniors ===
Yao represented China in three Pacific-Asia Junior Curling Championships, playing lead for the team in 2012 and 2014 and was the alternate in 2013. She would make the playoffs each year winning a bronze medal in 2012 and silver in 2013 and 2014.

=== Women's ===
Yao first represented China at the women's level when she was a member of the team at the 2017 Pacific-Asia Curling Championships. She played second on that team, skipped by Jiang Yilun. The team finished the round robin with a 8–2 record, which qualified them for the playoffs. The team would go on to lose the semifinal to Japan's Satsuki Fujisawa but would win the bronze medal after defeating Hong Kong. Her first World Women's Curling Championships was in 2018, as the alternate for the team skipped by Jiang Yilun. The team finished the round robin with a 6–6 record, just missing the playoffs. The next season, Yao won the 2019 World Qualification Event with her team, skipped by Mei Jie which qualified them for the 2019 World Women's Curling Championship. There, they qualified for the playoffs with a 7–5 record before losing their qualification game to Switzerland's Silvana Tirinzoni who went on to win the event. They did not play many events during the 2019–20 season as the junior Han Yu rink were named as the Chinese National Team. They played in two tour events at the start of the season, the Hokkaido Bank Curling Classic and the Advics Cup, finishing third and second respectively.

== Teams ==
Season	Skip	Third	Second	Lead	Alternate
2011–12	Jiang Yilun	She Qiutong	Wang Rui	Yao Mingyue	Mei Jie
2012–13	Jiang Yilun	Wang Rui	Yao Mingyue	She Qiutong	Liu Sijia
2013–14	Jiang Yilun	Wang Rui	Yao Mingyue	She Qiutong	
2017–18	Jiang Yilun	Jiang Xindi	Yao Mingyue	Yan Hui	Xu Meng
2018–19	Wang Rui (Fourth)	Mei Jie (Skip)	Yao Mingyue	Ma Jingyi	Zhang Lijun
2019–20	Wang Rui (Fourth)	Mei Jie (Skip)	Yao Mingyue	Ma Jingyi	
