= Dong Ziqi =

Chinese curler (born 1999)

- Curler
- Born: April 3, 1999 (age 27); Harbin, China

Team
- Curling club: Harbin CC, Harbin
- Skip: Wang Rui
- Third: Han Yu
- Second: Dong Ziqi
- Lead: Jiang Jiayi
- Alternate: Su Tingyu
- Mixed doubles partner: Fei Xueqing

Curling career
- Member Association: China
- World Championship: 3 (2021, 2025, 2026)
- Pacific-Asia Championship: 1 (2018)
- Pan Continental Championship: 2 (2024, 2025)
- Olympic: 2 (2022, 2026)
- Other appearances: Asian Winter Games: 1 (2025); World Junior Championships: 1 (2018), Pacific-Asia Junior Championships: 1 (2013)
Medal record
Women's curling
Representing China
World Women's Championship
Bronze medal – third place	2025 Uijeongbu
Asian Winter Games
Silver medal – second place	2025 Harbin	Women's
Pan Continental Championships
Gold medal – first place	2025 Virginia
Bronze medal – third place	2024 Lacombe
Pacific-Asia Championships
Bronze medal – third place	2018 Gangneung
World Junior Championships
Bronze medal – third place	2018 Aberdeen
Winter Universiade
Gold medal – first place	2023 Saranac Lake

Dong Ziqi (Chinese: 董子齐; pinyin: Dǒng Zǐqí; born April 3, 1999, in Harbin, Heilongjiang) is a Chinese curler. She currently plays second on Team Wang Rui.

== Career ==
Dong played third for the Chinese team that won a bronze medal at the 2018 World Junior Curling Championships. She was also the third for the team that won a bronze at the 2018 Pacific-Asia Curling Championships. Dong also competed in three legs of the 2018–19 Curling World Cup with her best finish at the Third Leg, where her team finished fourth. Dong played third for the Chinese team at the 2021 World Women's Curling Championship, skipped by Han Yu. The team finished in tenth at the tournament with a 6–7 record. Dong would play second on the Chinese team, skipped by Han on home soil at the 2022 Winter Olympics, where the team would finish 4–5 in the round-robin, finishing 7th.

Dong would return to international curling as second on the Chinese national team, skipped by Wang Rui at 2024 Pan Continental Curling Championships, where the team would win a bronze medal, qualifying them to return for the 2025 World Women's Curling Championship. In preparation for the World Championships, they would also represent China at the 2025 Asian Winter Games, where they won a silver medal, losing to South Korea's Gim Eun-ji 7–2 in the final. At the 2025 Worlds, the team finished the round robin with a 7–5 record, and would go on to win a bronze medal, this time beating Gim 9–4 in the bronze medal game. This bronze medal performance also qualified the Chinese women's team for the 2026 Winter Olympics.

During the 2025–26 season, Team Wang would participate in their first Grand Slam of Curling event at the 2025 Masters. At the event, Wang would finish with a 1–3 record. The team would then go on to represent China at the 2025 Pan Continental Curling Championships, where they would have an impressive week, going undefeated in the tournament and beating Canada's Rachel Homan 7–6 in the final.

== Personal life ==
Dong attended Beijing Sport University. She lives in Beijing.

== Teams ==
Season	Skip	Third	Second	Lead	Alternate	Coach	Events
2012–13	Jiang Xindi	Zhao Xiyang	Fu Yiwei	Dong Ziqi	Yao Mingyue	Zhang Zhipeng	PAJCC 2013 (silver)
2013–14	Dong Ziqi	Jiang Si-Miao	Wang Ziyue	Fu Yiwei	Wang Zi-Xin		
2014–15	Dong Ziqi	Jiang Si-Miao	Wang Ziyue	Fu Yiwei	Wang Zi-Xin		
2015–16	Dong Ziqi	Jiang Si-Miao	Fu Yiwei	Zhao Xiyang	Wang Ziyue		
2016–17	Wang Bingyu	Zhou Yan	Liu Jinli	Ma Jingyi	Dong Ziqi		
2016–17	Ma Jingyi	Dong Ziqi	Fan Suyuan	Gao Xue Song			
2017–18	Wang Bingyu	Zhou Yan	Liu Jinli	Ma Jingyi	Dong Ziqi		
2017–18	Dong Ziqi (fourth)	Wang Zixin (Skip)	Wang Meini	Sun Chengyu	Yu Jiaxin	Zhu Yu	WJCC 2018 (bronze)
2018–19	Jiang Yilun	Liu Sijia	Dong Ziqi	Jiang Xindi	Wang Rui (PACC)	Carolyn McRorie (PACC)	CWC 2018–19/1 (7th); PACC 2018 (bronze)
2018–19	Jiang Yilun	Zhang Lijun	Dong Ziqi	Jiang Xindi		Carolyn McRorie (CWC/3, CWC/final), Mike Harris (CWC/final)	CWC/3 (4th); CWC/final (5th)
2019–20	Jiang Yilun	Zhang Lijun	Dong Ziqi	Jiang Xindi			
2019–20	Han Yu	Zhang Lijun	Jiang Xindi	Yu Jiaxin	Dong Ziqi	Marco Mariani	
2020–21	Han Yu	Dong Ziqi	Zhang Lijun	Jiang Xindi	Yan Hui	Marco Mariani, Sören Grahn	WWCC 2021 (10th)
2021–22	Han Yu	Wang Rui	Dong Ziqi	Zhang Lijun	Jiang Xindi	Marco Mariani, Sören Grahn	WOG 2022 (7th)
2023–24	Wang Rui	Guo Yanan	Dong Ziqi	Yang Ying			
2024–25	Wang Rui	Han Yu	Dong Ziqi	Jiang Jiayi	Su Tingyu	Zang Jialiang	PCCC 2024 (bronze); AWG 2025 (silver); WCCC 2025 (bronze)
