= Curling at the 2022 Winter Olympics – Women's tournament =

Women's curling at the XXIV Olympic Winter Games
- Venue: Beijing National Aquatics Center
- Dates: 10–20 February
- Competitors: 50 from 10 nations

Medalists
1st place, gold medalist(s)		Eve Muirhead; Vicky Wright; Jennifer Dodds; Hailey Duff; Mili Smith	Great Britain
2nd place, silver medalist(s)		Satsuki Fujisawa; Chinami Yoshida; Yumi Suzuki; Yurika Yoshida; Kotomi Ishizaki	Japan
3rd place, bronze medalist(s)		Anna Hasselborg; Sara McManus; Agnes Knochenhauer; Sofia Mabergs; Johanna Heldin	Sweden

The women's curling tournament of the 2022 Winter Olympics was held at the Beijing National Aquatics Center from 10 to 20 February 2022. Ten nations competed in a round robin preliminary round, and the top four nations at the conclusion of the round robin qualified for the medal round. Great Britain defeated Japan in the final to claim the gold medal. Sweden won the bronze medal play-off against Switzerland.

== Competition schedule ==
RR	Round robin	SF	Semifinals	B	3rd place play-off	F	Final

Thu 10	Fri 11	Sat 12	Sun 13	Mon 14	Tue 15	Wed 16	Thu 17	Fri 18	Sat 19	Sun 20
RR	RR	RR	RR	RR	RR	RR	RR	SF	B	F

== Qualification ==
The top six nations at the 2021 World Women's Curling Championship qualified along with hosts China. The final three teams qualified through the 2021 Olympic Qualification Event.

Means of qualification	Dates	Location	Quotas	Qualified
Host nation	—N/a		1	China
2021 World Women's Curling Championship	30 April–9 May 2021	Calgary, Canada	6	Switzerland; ROC; United States; Sweden; Denmark; Canada
Olympic Qualification Event	11–18 December 2021	Leeuwarden, Netherlands	3	Great Britain; Japan; South Korea
Total			10	

== Teams ==
The teams are listed as follows:

Canada	China	Denmark	Great Britain	Japan
Skip: Jennifer Jones; Third: Kaitlyn Lawes; Second: Jocelyn Peterman; Lead: Dawn McEwen; Alternate: Lisa Weagle	Skip: Han Yu; Third: Wang Rui; Second: Dong Ziqi; Lead: Zhang Lijun; Alternate: Jiang Xindi	Skip: Madeleine Dupont; Third: Mathilde Halse; Second: Denise Dupont; Lead: My Larsen; Alternate: Jasmin Lander	Skip: Eve Muirhead; Third: Vicky Wright; Second: Jennifer Dodds; Lead: Hailey Duff; Alternate: Mili Smith	Skip: Satsuki Fujisawa; Third: Chinami Yoshida; Second: Yumi Suzuki; Lead: Yurika Yoshida; Alternate: Kotomi Ishizaki
ROC	South Korea	Sweden	Switzerland	United States
Skip: Alina Kovaleva; Third: Yulia Portunova; Second: Galina Arsenkina; Lead: Ekaterina Kuzmina; Alternate: Maria Komarova	Skip: Kim Eun-jung; Third: Kim Kyeong-ae; Second: Kim Cho-hi; Lead: Kim Seon-yeong; Alternate: Kim Yeong-mi	Skip: Anna Hasselborg; Third: Sara McManus; Second: Agnes Knochenhauer; Lead: Sofia Mabergs; Alternate: Johanna Heldin	Fourth: Alina Pätz; Skip: Silvana Tirinzoni; Second: Esther Neuenschwander; Lead: Melanie Barbezat; Alternate: Carole Howald	Skip: Tabitha Peterson; Third: Nina Roth; Second: Becca Hamilton; Lead: Tara Peterson; Alternate: Aileen Geving

== Round-robin standings ==
Final Round Robin Standings
Team	Skip	Pld	W	L	W–L	PF	PA	EW	EL	BE	SE	S%	DSC	Qualification
Switzerland	Silvana Tirinzoni	9	8	1	–	67	46	44	36	4	12	81.6%	19.14	Playoffs
Sweden	Anna Hasselborg	9	7	2	–	64	49	39	35	6	12	82.0%	25.02	Playoffs
Great Britain	Eve Muirhead	9	5	4	1–1	63	47	39	33	4	9	80.6%	35.27	Playoffs
Japan	Satsuki Fujisawa	9	5	4	1–1	64	62	40	36	2	13	82.3%	36.00	Playoffs
Canada	Jennifer Jones	9	5	4	1–1	71	59	42	41	1	14	80.4%	45.44	
United States	Tabitha Peterson	9	4	5	2–0	60	64	40	39	2	12	79.5%	33.87	
China	Han Yu	9	4	5	1–1	56	67	38	41	3	10	79.6%	30.06	
South Korea	Kim Eun-jung	9	4	5	0–2	62	66	40	42	3	10	80.8%	27.79	
Denmark	Madeleine Dupont	9	2	7	–	50	68	33	41	7	0	77.2%	23.36	
ROC	Alina Kovaleva	9	1	8	–	50	79	34	45	2	7	78.9%	29.34	

Women's Round Robin Summary Table
Pos	Team	W	L	SUI	SWE	GBR	JPN	CAN	USA	CHN	KOR	DEN	ROC
1	Switzerland	8	1	—	5–6	6–5	8–4	8–4	9–6	7–5	8–4	8–5	8–7
2	Sweden	7	2	6–5	—	2–8	8–5	7–6	10–4	6–9	8–4	9–3	8–5
3	Great Britain	5	4	5–6	8–2	—	10–4	3–7	10–5	4–8	7–9	7–2	9–4
4	Japan	5	4	4–8	5–8	4–10	—	8–5	10–7	10–2	5–10	8–7	10–5
5	Canada	5	4	4–8	6–7	7–3	5–8	—	7–6	9–11	12–7	10–4	11–5
6	United States	4	5	6–9	4–10	5–10	7–10	6–7	—	8–4	8–6	7–5	9–3
7	China	4	5	5–7	9–6	8–4	2–10	11–9	4–8	—	6–5	6–7	5–11
8	South Korea	4	5	4–8	4–8	9–7	10–5	7–12	6–8	5–6	—	8–7	9–5
9	Denmark	2	7	5–8	3–9	2–7	7–8	4–10	5–7	7–6	7–8	—	10–5
10	ROC	1	8	7–8	5–8	4–9	5–10	5–11	3–9	11–5	5–9	5–10	—

== Round-robin results ==
All draw times are listed in China Standard Time (UTC+08:00).

=== Draw 1 ===
Thursday, 10 February, 9:05

Sheet A	1	2	3	4	5	6	7	8	9	10	11	Final
Great Britain (Muirhead)	0	0	1	0	0	2	1	0	1	0	0	5
Switzerland (Tirinzoni) 🔨	0	1	0	1	0	0	0	2	0	1	1	6

Sheet B	1	2	3	4	5	6	7	8	9	10	Final
Denmark (Dupont) 🔨	0	2	0	1	0	0	3	0	0	1	7
China (Han)	0	0	1	0	2	0	0	1	2	0	6

Sheet C	1	2	3	4	5	6	7	8	9	10	Final
Sweden (Hasselborg) 🔨	0	1	0	0	1	3	0	3	0	X	8
Japan (Fujisawa)	0	0	2	1	0	0	1	0	1	X	5

Sheet D	1	2	3	4	5	6	7	8	9	10	Final
ROC (Kovaleva)	0	1	0	0	0	2	0	X	X	X	3
United States (Peterson) 🔨	2	0	1	1	2	0	3	X	X	X	9

=== Draw 2 ===
Thursday, 10 February, 20:05

Sheet A	1	2	3	4	5	6	7	8	9	10	Final
Canada (Jones)	0	2	0	3	1	0	3	0	1	2	12
South Korea (Kim) 🔨	1	0	3	0	0	2	0	1	0	0	7

Sheet B	1	2	3	4	5	6	7	8	9	10	Final
Sweden (Hasselborg) 🔨	0	0	1	0	0	1	0	X	X	X	2
Great Britain (Muirhead)	0	1	0	4	1	0	2	X	X	X	8

Sheet C	1	2	3	4	5	6	7	8	9	10	Final
United States (Peterson)	1	0	2	0	0	1	0	2	0	1	7
Denmark (Dupont) 🔨	0	1	0	2	0	0	1	0	1	0	5

Sheet D	1	2	3	4	5	6	7	8	9	10	Final
China (Han) 🔨	0	1	0	1	0	1	0	2	0	0	5
Switzerland (Tirinzoni)	1	0	1	0	1	0	2	0	1	1	7

=== Draw 3 ===
Friday, 11 February, 14:05

Sheet A	1	2	3	4	5	6	7	8	9	10	Final
United States (Peterson)	2	0	1	1	1	1	0	2	0	X	8
China (Han) 🔨	0	1	0	0	0	0	2	0	1	X	4

Sheet B	1	2	3	4	5	6	7	8	9	10	Final
Canada (Jones) 🔨	0	2	0	0	0	2	0	1	0	X	5
Japan (Fujisawa)	1	0	2	1	1	0	2	0	1	X	8

Sheet C	1	2	3	4	5	6	7	8	9	10	Final
Switzerland (Tirinzoni) 🔨	2	0	0	1	0	0	2	3	0	0	8
ROC (Kovaleva)	0	0	1	0	1	2	0	0	2	1	7

Sheet D	1	2	3	4	5	6	7	8	9	10	Final
South Korea (Kim) 🔨	0	0	2	1	0	2	0	0	4	0	9
Great Britain (Muirhead)	0	1	0	0	2	0	1	2	0	1	7

=== Draw 4 ===
Saturday, 12 February, 9:05

Sheet A	1	2	3	4	5	6	7	8	9	10	Final
Sweden (Hasselborg) 🔨	0	0	2	0	3	0	1	0	1	0	7
Canada (Jones)	1	0	0	1	0	1	0	2	0	1	6

Sheet B	1	2	3	4	5	6	7	8	9	10	Final
South Korea (Kim) 🔨	1	0	2	1	2	0	2	0	1	X	9
ROC (Kovaleva)	0	2	0	0	0	1	0	2	0	X	5

Sheet D	1	2	3	4	5	6	7	8	9	10	Final
Japan (Fujisawa)	0	1	0	2	0	1	0	1	0	3	8
Denmark (Dupont) 🔨	0	0	2	0	2	0	2	0	1	0	7

=== Draw 5 ===
Saturday, 12 February, 20:05

Sheet A	1	2	3	4	5	6	7	8	9	10	Final
ROC (Kovaleva) 🔨	1	0	1	2	0	1	0	0	0	0	5
Japan (Fujisawa)	0	1	0	0	1	0	3	1	1	3	10

Sheet B	1	2	3	4	5	6	7	8	9	10	Final
Denmark (Dupont)	0	0	1	0	0	0	3	0	1	0	5
Switzerland (Tirinzoni) 🔨	1	0	0	1	0	1	0	3	0	2	8

Sheet C	1	2	3	4	5	6	7	8	9	10	Final
Great Britain (Muirhead) 🔨	2	2	0	0	1	0	2	0	3	X	10
United States (Peterson)	0	0	0	2	0	2	0	1	0	X	5

Sheet D	1	2	3	4	5	6	7	8	9	10	Final
Sweden (Hasselborg)	0	0	2	0	0	2	2	0	0	X	6
China (Han) 🔨	0	3	0	1	2	0	0	2	1	X	9

=== Draw 6 ===
Sunday, 13 February, 14:05

Sheet A	1	2	3	4	5	6	7	8	9	10	Final
Denmark (Dupont)	0	0	1	0	0	1	0	0	0	X	2
Great Britain (Muirhead) 🔨	2	0	0	0	1	0	0	1	3	X	7

Sheet B	1	2	3	4	5	6	7	8	9	10	Final
United States (Peterson)	0	0	2	1	0	0	1	0	0	X	4
Sweden (Hasselborg) 🔨	0	2	0	0	1	2	0	2	3	X	10

Sheet C	1	2	3	4	5	6	7	8	9	10	11	Final
South Korea (Kim)	2	0	0	1	0	1	0	0	0	1	0	5
China (Han) 🔨	0	1	1	0	1	0	0	2	0	0	1	6

Sheet D	1	2	3	4	5	6	7	8	9	10	Final
Switzerland (Tirinzoni) 🔨	1	1	0	1	0	0	1	2	2	X	8
Canada (Jones)	0	0	1	0	2	1	0	0	0	X	4

=== Draw 7 ===
Monday, 14 February, 9:05

Sheet B	1	2	3	4	5	6	7	8	9	10	Final
China (Han)	0	1	0	0	0	1	0	0	X	X	2
Japan (Fujisawa) 🔨	0	0	3	1	3	0	2	1	X	X	10

Sheet C	1	2	3	4	5	6	7	8	9	10	Final
Canada (Jones)	2	2	0	2	0	2	0	1	2	X	11
ROC (Kovaleva) 🔨	0	0	1	0	2	0	2	0	0	X	5

Sheet D	1	2	3	4	5	6	7	8	9	10	Final
United States (Peterson)	0	0	1	0	1	3	0	2	0	1	8
South Korea (Kim) 🔨	0	1	0	1	0	0	2	0	2	0	6

=== Draw 8 ===
Monday, 14 February, 20:05

Sheet A	1	2	3	4	5	6	7	8	9	10	11	Final
Switzerland (Tirinzoni) 🔨	1	0	0	1	0	0	0	2	0	1	0	5
Sweden (Hasselborg)	0	0	1	0	1	1	1	0	1	0	1	6

Sheet B	1	2	3	4	5	6	7	8	9	10	Final
Great Britain (Muirhead) 🔨	0	0	1	0	0	1	0	1	0	0	3
Canada (Jones)	1	0	0	0	3	0	1	0	1	1	7

Sheet C	1	2	3	4	5	6	7	8	9	10	Final
Japan (Fujisawa) 🔨	0	2	0	0	2	0	0	1	0	X	5
South Korea (Kim)	1	0	3	1	0	2	1	0	2	X	10

Sheet D	1	2	3	4	5	6	7	8	9	10	Final
Denmark (Dupont) 🔨	2	0	0	1	0	1	0	3	0	3	10
ROC (Kovaleva)	0	2	0	0	1	0	1	0	1	0	5

=== Draw 9 ===
Tuesday, 15 February, 14:05

Sheet A	1	2	3	4	5	6	7	8	9	10	Final
China (Han) 🔨	2	0	0	2	0	1	0	0	X	X	5
ROC (Kovaleva)	0	1	1	0	4	0	3	2	X	X	11

Sheet B	1	2	3	4	5	6	7	8	9	10	Final
Sweden (Hasselborg)	0	2	3	0	3	0	1	X	X	X	9
Denmark (Dupont) 🔨	1	0	0	1	0	1	0	X	X	X	3

Sheet C	1	2	3	4	5	6	7	8	9	10	Final
United States (Peterson) 🔨	1	0	1	1	0	1	0	2	0	0	6
Switzerland (Tirinzoni)	0	2	0	0	1	0	1	0	4	1	9

Sheet D	1	2	3	4	5	6	7	8	9	10	Final
Great Britain (Muirhead) 🔨	3	0	3	0	1	0	1	2	X	X	10
Japan (Fujisawa)	0	1	0	2	0	1	0	0	X	X	4

=== Draw 10 ===
Wednesday, 16 February, 9:05

Sheet A	1	2	3	4	5	6	7	8	9	10	Final
Canada (Jones)	0	2	2	0	0	1	1	0	0	1	7
United States (Peterson) 🔨	1	0	0	1	1	0	0	2	1	0	6

Sheet B	1	2	3	4	5	6	7	8	9	10	Final
Switzerland (Tirinzoni) 🔨	0	0	1	0	3	0	0	0	2	2	8
South Korea (Kim)	0	1	0	1	0	1	1	0	0	0	4

Sheet C	1	2	3	4	5	6	7	8	9	10	Final
China (Han)	0	0	1	0	1	0	2	0	3	1	8
Great Britain (Muirhead) 🔨	1	0	0	1	0	1	0	1	0	0	4

=== Draw 11 ===
Wednesday, 16 February, 20:05

Sheet A	1	2	3	4	5	6	7	8	9	10	Final
South Korea (Kim)	0	2	0	1	0	2	0	1	0	2	8
Denmark (Dupont) 🔨	1	0	1	0	3	0	1	0	1	0	7

Sheet B	1	2	3	4	5	6	7	8	9	10	Final
Japan (Fujisawa) 🔨	1	3	0	2	0	1	0	2	1	X	10
United States (Peterson)	0	0	2	0	1	0	4	0	0	X	7

Sheet C	1	2	3	4	5	6	7	8	9	10	Final
ROC (Kovaleva) 🔨	2	1	0	1	0	0	1	0	0	0	5
Sweden (Hasselborg)	0	0	2	0	1	1	0	2	0	2	8

Sheet D	1	2	3	4	5	6	7	8	9	10	11	Final
Canada (Jones) 🔨	0	0	1	2	0	5	0	0	1	0	0	9
China (Han)	1	2	0	0	2	0	2	1	0	1	2	11

=== Draw 12 ===
Thursday, 17 February, 14:05

Sheet A	1	2	3	4	5	6	7	8	9	10	Final
Japan (Fujisawa)	0	2	0	0	0	0	2	0	0	X	4
Switzerland (Tirinzoni) 🔨	1	0	1	1	2	0	0	0	3	X	8

Sheet B	1	2	3	4	5	6	7	8	9	10	Final
ROC (Kovaleva)	0	1	0	1	0	0	1	1	0	X	4
Great Britain (Muirhead) 🔨	2	0	1	0	1	1	0	0	4	X	9

Sheet C	1	2	3	4	5	6	7	8	9	10	Final
Denmark (Dupont)	0	1	0	2	0	0	0	1	X	X	4
Canada (Jones) 🔨	1	0	2	0	2	3	2	0	X	X	10

Sheet D	1	2	3	4	5	6	7	8	9	10	Final
South Korea (Kim)	0	2	0	1	0	0	1	0	0	0	4
Sweden (Hasselborg) 🔨	0	0	1	0	1	1	0	2	1	2	8

== Playoffs ==
Semifinals
1	Switzerland	6
4	Japan	8
2	Sweden	11
3	Great Britain	12

Gold medal game
4	Japan	3
3	Great Britain	10
Bronze medal game
1	Switzerland	7
2	Sweden	9

=== Semifinals ===
Friday, 18 February, 20:05

Sheet C	1	2	3	4	5	6	7	8	9	10	Final
Switzerland (Tirinzoni) 🔨	0	1	0	1	0	0	3	0	1	0	6
Japan (Fujisawa)	0	0	1	0	4	1	0	1	0	1	8

Player percentages
Switzerland		Japan	
Melanie Barbezat	81%	Yurika Yoshida	99%
Esther Neuenschwander	95%	Yumi Suzuki	85%
Silvana Tirinzoni	75%	Chinami Yoshida	81%
Alina Pätz	74%	Satsuki Fujisawa	89%
Total	81%	Total	88%

Sheet A	1	2	3	4	5	6	7	8	9	10	11	Final
Sweden (Hasselborg) 🔨	4	0	1	0	0	2	0	1	0	3	0	11
Great Britain (Muirhead)	0	3	0	1	1	0	2	0	4	0	1	12

Player percentages
Sweden		Great Britain	
Sofia Mabergs	93%	Hailey Duff	80%
Agnes Knochenhauer	91%	Jennifer Dodds	83%
Sara McManus	85%	Vicky Wright	86%
Anna Hasselborg	74%	Eve Muirhead	85%
Total	86%	Total	83%

=== Bronze medal game ===
Saturday, 19 February, 20:05

Sheet B	1	2	3	4	5	6	7	8	9	10	Final
Switzerland (Tirinzoni) 🔨	0	1	0	0	1	0	2	0	3	0	7
Sweden (Hasselborg)	1	0	0	2	0	3	0	2	0	1	9

Player percentages
Switzerland		Sweden	
Melanie Barbezat	79%	Sofia Mabergs	89%
Esther Neuenschwander	75%	Agnes Knochenhauer	80%
Silvana Tirinzoni	81%	Sara McManus	81%
Alina Pätz	64%	Anna Hasselborg	76%
Total	75%	Total	82%

=== Gold medal game ===
Sunday, 20 February, 9:05

Sheet B	1	2	3	4	5	6	7	8	9	10	Final
Japan (Fujisawa)	0	1	0	0	0	1	0	1	0	X	3
Great Britain (Muirhead) 🔨	2	0	0	1	1	0	4	0	2	X	10

Player percentages
Japan		Great Britain	
Yurika Yoshida	97%	Hailey Duff	90%
Yumi Suzuki	82%	Jennifer Dodds	89%
Chinami Yoshida	64%	Vicky Wright	89%
Satsuki Fujisawa	69%	Eve Muirhead	88%
Total	78%	Total	89%

== Final standings ==
The final standings are:

Place	Team
1st place, gold medalist(s)	Great Britain
2nd place, silver medalist(s)	Japan
3rd place, bronze medalist(s)	Sweden
4	Switzerland
5	Canada
6	United States
7	China
8	South Korea
9	Denmark
10	ROC

== Statistics ==
=== Player percentages ===
Percentages by draw.

==== Lead ====
#	Curler	1	2	3	4	5	6	7	8	9	Total
1	Yurika Yoshida (JPN)	98	85	89	86	88	96	94	84	89	89.6
2	Dawn McEwen (CAN)	85	96	99	88	94	76	94	83	91	89.3
3	Sofia Mabergs (SWE)	92	96	91	86	88	83	89	88	91	89.0
4	Ekaterina Kuzmina (ROC)	91	95	90	78	83	85	88	85	86	86.8
5	Zhang Lijun (CHN)	91	89	84	89	86	92	77 (2)	88 (2)	83 (2)	86.5
6	Tara Peterson (USA)	82	93	89	88	86	75	81	90	90	86.0
7	Melanie Barbezat (SUI)	83	86	81	86	85	84	89	96	78	85.3
8	Hailey Duff (GBR)	75	84	93	72	88	84	94	89	78	83.7
9	Kim Seon-yeong (KOR)	86	80	80	92	66	90	81	86	90	83.7
10	My Larsen (DEN)	86	88	80	79	81	74	96	81	83	82.6

==== Second ====
#	Curler	1	2	3	4	5	6	7	8	9	Total
1	Esther Neuenschwander (SUI)	81	89	86	84	97	86	68	74	83 (3)	83.1
2	Agnes Knochenhauer (SWE)	94	88	74	70	94	73	95	84	78	82.3
3	Kim Cho-hi (KOR)	80	76	88	–	84	–	83	74	86	81.4
4	Jennifer Dodds (GBR)	82	79	76	93	97	78	86	68	74	81.0
5	Yumi Suzuki (JPN)	86	79	84	66	91	75	88	76	86	80.9
6	Galina Arsenkina (ROC)	79	71	80	76	74	83	92	84	74	78.9
7	Jocelyn Peterman (CAN)	86	78	70	89	74	80	89	76	58	78.1
8	Dong Ziqi (CHN)	73	85	81	91	82	64	48 (3)	84 (3)	81 (3)	77.4
9	Denise Dupont (DEN)	90	75	86	64	86	74	80	70	67	76.9
10	Becca Hamilton (USA)	46	63	70	74	88	84	78	78	60	71.7

==== Third ====
#	Curler	1	2	3	4	5	6	7	8	9	Total
1	Vicky Wright (GBR)	80	84	76	86	83	85	83	89	68	81.5
2	Nina Roth (USA)	82	80	84	72	85	95	73	78	79	80.7
3	Kaitlyn Lawes (CAN)	74	69	85	73	85	85	81	89	77	79.7
4	Silvana Tirinzoni (SUI)	82	79	78	76	78	76	80	88	83	79.7
5	Kim Kyeong-ae (KOR)	74	76	86	85	86	81	84	65	76	79.3
6	Chinami Yoshida (JPN)	74	78	89	81	80	82	72	78	75	78.7
7	Sara McManus (SWE)	83	82	84	75	81	74	88	73	74	78.6
8	Yulia Portunova (ROC)	70	63	83	81	72	88	91	75	72	77.1
9	Wang Rui (CHN)	76	83	84	75 (4)	88 (4)	55 (4)	52 (4)	83 (4)	86 (4)	76.8
10	Mathilde Halse (DEN)	69	74	79	78	83	88	63	70	61	74.3

==== Fourth ====
#	Curler	1	2	3	4	5	6	7	8	9	Total
1	Satsuki Fujisawa (JPN)	76	88	81	89	89	71	68	80	75	80.1
2	Kim Eun-jung (KOR)	79	78	93	84	75	90	84	71	65	79.7
3	Tabitha Peterson (USA)	91	86	88	57	74	88	79	80	74	79.3
4	Anna Hasselborg (SWE)	74	71	73	66	81	89	91	84	75	78.0
5	Alina Pätz (SUI)	75	83	79	70	87	76	80	76	76	77.9
6	Eve Muirhead (GBR)	75	89	59	83	81	69	78	76	79	76.1
7	Madeleine Dupont (DEN)	83	76	83	74	75	82	66	75	56	75.0
8	Jennifer Jones (CAN)	83	66	73	65	78	87	78	68	73	74.4
9	Han Yu (CHN)	80	70	71	71 (3)	84 (3)	61 (3)	–	–	–	73.5
10	Alina Kovaleva (ROC)	80	78	79	64	53	71	86	76	72	73.0

==== Alternate ====
#	Curler	1	2	3	4	5	6	7	8	9	Total
1	Carole Howald (SUI)	–	–	–	–	–	–	–	–	91 (2)	90.6
2	Jiang Xindi (CHN)	–	–	–	–	–	–	75 (1)	83 (1)	97 (1)	85.8
3	Jasmin Lander (DEN)	–	–	–	–	–	–	–	–	83 (1)	83.3
4	Kim Yeong-mi (KOR)	–	–	–	75 (2)	–	81 (2)	–	–	–	77.6

==== Team total ====
#	Team	1	2	3	4	5	6	7	8	9	Total
1	Japan	84	82	86	81	87	81	81	79	81	82.3
2	Sweden	86	84	80	74	86	80	91	82	79	82.0
3	Switzerland	80	84	81	79	87	81	79	83	81	81.6
4	South Korea	80	78	87	84	78	86	83	74	79	80.8
5	Great Britain	78	84	76	84	87	79	85	80	75	80.6
6	Canada	82	77	82	79	83	82	85	79	75	80.4
7	China	80	82	80	81	85	68	63	84	87	79.6
8	United States	75	80	82	73	83	85	78	81	76	79.5
9	ROC	80	77	83	75	70	82	89	80	76	78.9
10	Denmark	82	78	82	73	81	79	76	74	67	77.2
