= Zhang Lijun (curler) =

Chinese curler (born 1996)

- Curler
- Born: September 12, 1996 (age 30); Harbin, China

Team
- Curling club: Harbin CC, Harbin
- Skip: Wang Meini
- Third: Zhang Lijun
- Second: Yang Ying
- Lead: Ding Xuixin

Curling career
- Member Association: China
- World Championship: 2 (2019, 2021)
- Pacific-Asia Championship: 1 (2019)
- Olympic: 1 (2022)
Medal record
Women's curling
Representing China
Pacific-Asia Championships
Gold medal – first place	2019 Shenzhen

Zhang Lijun (simplified Chinese: 张丽君; traditional Chinese: 張麗君; pinyin: Zhāng Lìjūn; born September 12, 1996, in Harbin) is a Chinese female curler. She is a 2019 Pacific-Asia champion.

== Teams ==
=== Women's ===
Season	Skip	Third	Second	Lead	Alternate	Coach	Events
2012–13	Zhang Lijun	Yan Xue Qi	Song Yue	Yi Chenxin	Jiang Mengjiao		
2014–15	Fu Yiwei	Sun Chengyu	Yang Ying	She Qiutong	Zhang Lijun		
2015–16	Jiang Xindi	Zhang Lijun	Yin Yanxin	Zhu Zihui	Zhao Ruiyi	Shi Mengyu	WJBCC 2016 (5th)
2016–17	Wang Bingyu	Zhang Lijun	Jiang Simiao	Zhao Ruiyi			
2016–17	Zhang Lijun	Jiang Simiao	Zhao Ruiyi	Kong Yuxuan	Wang Meini	Wang Fengchun	WJBCC 2017 (4th)
2018–19	Jiang Yilun	Zhang Lijun	Dong Ziqi	Jiang Xindi		Carolyn McRorie, Mike Harris (CWC/final)	CWC/3 (4th); CWC/final (5th)
2018–19	Wang Rui (Fourth)	Mei Jie (Skip)	Yao Mingyue	Ma Jingyi	Zhang Lijun	Zhang Zhipeng, Mike Harris	WWCC 2019 (6th)
2019–20	Jiang Yilun	Zhang Lijun	Dong Ziqi	Jiang Xindi			
2019–20	Han Yu	Zhang Lijun	Jiang Xindi	Zhao Ruiyi	Yu Jiaxin	Marco Mariani, Sören Grahn	PACC 2019 (gold)
2019–20	Han Yu	Zhang Lijun	Jiang Xindi	Yu Jiaxin	Dong Ziqi	Marco Mariani	
2020–21	Han Yu	Dong Ziqi	Zhang Lijun	Jiang Xindi	Yan Hui	Marco Mariani, Sören Grahn	WWCC 2021 (10th)
2021–22	Han Yu	Wang Rui	Dong Ziqi	Zhang Lijun	Jiang Xindi	Marco Mariani, Sören Grahn	OG 2022 (7th)
2022–23	Wang Meini	Zhang Lijun	Yang Ying	Ding Xuexin		Marco Mariani, Sören Grahn	

=== Mixed doubles ===
Season	Male	Female
2016–17	Wang Zhiyu	Zhang Lijun
