= Shi Mengyu =

Chinese association football player

Personal information
- Date of birth: 30 December 1982 (age 43)
- Position: Defender

International career
| Years | Team | Apps | (Gls) |
- China

Shi Mengyu (born 30 December 1982) is a Chinese professional association football player who plays as a defender in the Chinese Women's Super League. She is also a member of the Chinese women's national football team. Mengyu represented China in the 2006 AFC Women's Asian Cup.
