= Tan Weidong =

Chinese curler

Tan Weidong 谭伟东
- Curler
- Born: 9 May 1970 (age 56); Heilongjiang

Tan Weidong (Chinese: 谭伟东; born May 9, 1970) is a Chinese male curler and curling coach.

== Personal life ==
Tan currently lives in Edmonton, and is married.

== Record as a coach of national teams ==
Year	Tournament, event	National team	Place
2002	2002 Pacific Curling Championships	China (men)	5
2003	2003 Asian Winter Games	China (women)	3rd place, bronze medalist(s)
2004	2004 Pacific Curling Championships	China (women)	2nd place, silver medalist(s)
2005	2005 Pacific-Asia Junior Curling Championships	China (junior women)	1st place, gold medalist(s)
2005	2005 World Junior Curling Championships	China (junior women)	9
2005	2005 World Women's Curling Championship	China (women)	7
2005	2005 Pacific Curling Championships	China (women)	2nd place, silver medalist(s)
2006	2006 Pacific-Asia Junior Curling Championships	China (junior women)	1st place, gold medalist(s)
2006	2006 World Women's Curling Championship	China (women)	5
2006	2006 Pacific Curling Championships	China (women)	1st place, gold medalist(s)
2007	2007 Asian Winter Games	China (men)	3rd place, bronze medalist(s)
2007	2007 Asian Winter Games	China (women)	3rd place, bronze medalist(s)
2007	2007 World Women's Curling Championship	China (women)	7
2007	2007 Pacific Curling Championships	China (women)	1st place, gold medalist(s)
2008	2008 Pacific-Asia Junior Curling Championships	China (junior women)	2nd place, silver medalist(s)
2008	2008 World Women's Curling Championship	China (women)	2nd place, silver medalist(s)
2008	2008 Pacific Curling Championships	China (women)	1st place, gold medalist(s)
2009	2009 Pacific Curling Championships	China (women)	1st place, gold medalist(s)
2010	2010 Winter Olympics	China (women)	3rd place, bronze medalist(s)
2010	2010 World Women's Curling Championship	China (women)	7
2010	2010 Pacific Curling Championships	China (women)	2nd place, silver medalist(s)
2012	2012 Pacific-Asia Curling Championships	China (women)	1st place, gold medalist(s)
2013	2013 World Women's Curling Championship	China (women)	9
2013	2013 World Mixed Doubles Curling Championship	China (mixed doubles)	13
2013	2013 Pacific-Asia Curling Championships	China (women)	2nd place, silver medalist(s)
2014	2014 World Women's Curling Championship	China (women)	7
2016	2016 Pacific-Asia Curling Championships	China (women)	2nd place, silver medalist(s)
2017	2017 Asian Winter Games	China (women)	1st place, gold medalist(s)
2018	2018 Winter Olympics	China (women)	5
2018	2018 World Women's Curling Championship	China (women)	7
