= 2018 China Open (curling) =

World Curling Tour event

- Host city: Chongqing, China
- Dates: October 16–22
- Men's winner: (Russia) Team Glukhov
- Curling club: Ice Cube CC, Sochi, Russia
- Skip: Sergey Glukhov
- Third: Artur Ali
- Second: Dmitry Mironov
- Lead: Anton Kalalb
- Finalist: (Canada) Brad Gushue
- Women's winner: (Russia) Team Kovaleva
- Curling club: Adamant CC, Saint Petersburg, Russia
- Skip: Alina Kovaleva
- Third: Anastasia Bryzgalova
- Second: Uliana Vasilyeva
- Lead: Ekaterina Kuzmina
- Alternate: Galina Arsenkina
- Finalist: (Switzerland) Ursi Hegner

The 2018 China Open was held from October 16 to 22 in Chongqing, China. It was the second edition of the event which was first held in 2013. The winning team on both sides received $50,000 of the total $200,000 (US).

In both the men's and women's events, the Russian teams came out victorious. In the men's final, Sergey Glukhov won 9–8 over Canada's Brad Gushue while in the women's, Alina Kovaleva won 6–4 over Switzerland's Ursi Hegner, both in extra ends.

Through the round robin stage, both the Gushue and Glukhov rinks posted 6–1 records, however, the Canadian team received first place due to their head-to-head victory over the Russian team. Sweden's Fredrik Nyman as well as Norway's Thomas Ulsrud both also qualified for the playoff stage with 5–2 records each. In the semifinals, Team Gushue won 5–2 over the Nyman rink who they had previously lost to in the round robin. Russia's Glukhov also got one in the eighth end to knock off Norway's Ulsrud 4–3 in the other semifinal. In the high scoring final, the Russian side stole a single in the seventh end before the Canadian team got two in the eighth to tie the game. In the extra, Sergey Glukhov counted one to ensure the victory for his team. The lineup also includes Artur Ali, Dmitry Mironov and Anton Kalalb. Norway's Ulsrud rink won the bronze medal game by defeating the Nyman rink 8–2. The men's field was rounded out by teams from South Korea, Switzerland, China and the United States.

The women's division was not the same narrative, with the Russian women's team of Alina Kovaleva, Anastasia Bryzgalova, Uliana Vasilyeva, Ekaterina Kuzmina and Galina Arsenkina going 7–0 through the round robin. The three other qualifiers all had 4–3 records, Switzerland's Hegner, Canada's Jennifer Jones and China's Mei Jie. The Russian rink continued their dominance in the semifinal with a 5–3 win over the Chinese Mei team, while Hegner bounced Canada's Team Jones by a score of 8–3. In the final, Team Hegner were forced to a single in the eighth end to send a game to an extra end. It was there where the Russian team sealed the victory and the second annual China Open cup. Canada's Jones took home the third place title with a triumphant 10–3 final over China's Mei. Denmark, Scotland, Germany and the United States rounded out the women's field of the 2018 event.

== Men ==
=== Teams ===
The teams are listed as follows:

Skip	Third	Second	Lead	Locale
Sergey Glukhov	Artur Ali	Dmitry Mironov	Anton Kalalb	Sochi, Russia
Brad Gushue	Mark Nichols	Brett Gallant	Geoff Walker	St. John's, Newfoundland and Labrador, Canada
Kim Soo-hyuk	Jeong Byeong-jin	Lee Jeong-jae	Lee Dong-hyung	Seoul, South Korea
Lucien Lottenbach	Rainer Kobler	Patrick Abächerli	Tom Winkelhausen	Luzern, Switzerland
Ma Xiuyue	Jiang Dongxu	Ling Zhi	Wang Jingyuan	Beijing, China
Kroy Nernberger	Sean Beighton	Alex Leichter	Derrick McLean	Madison, Wisconsin, United States
Fredrik Nyman	Axel Sjöberg	Max Bäck	Victor Martinsson	Stockholm, Sweden
Thomas Ulsrud	Torger Nergård	Christoffer Svae	Håvard Vad Petersson	Oslo, Norway

=== Round-robin standings ===
Final round-robin standings

Key
Teams to Playoffs

Team	W	L	W–L	PF	PA	EW	EL	BE	SE
(Canada) Brad Gushue	6	1	1–0	53	28	24	19	3	8
(Russia) Sergey Glukhov	6	1	0–1	39	32	26	22	3	9
(Norway) Thomas Ulsrud	5	2	1–0	41	23	25	19	2	11
(Sweden) Fredrik Nyman	5	2	0–1	42	27	27	21	3	11
(South Korea) Kim Soo-hyuk	3	4	–	35	47	22	25	0	5
(Switzerland) Lucien Lottenbach	1	6	1–1	30	44	22	26	2	6
(China) Ma Xiuyue	1	6	1–1	21	43	17	26	2	4
(United States) Kroy Nernberger	1	6	1–1	26	43	20	25	4	5

=== Round-robin results ===
All draw times are listed in China Standard Time (UTC+08:00).

==== Draw 1 ====
Tuesday, October 16, 9:00 am

Sheet A	1	2	3	4	5	6	7	8	Final
(Norway) Thomas Ulsrud	0	0	0	1	0	0	0	X	1
(Russia) Sergey Glukhov	1	0	1	0	1	1	2	X	6

Sheet B	1	2	3	4	5	6	7	8	Final
(China) Ma Xiuyue	0	0	0	1	0	0	1	X	2
(Switzerland) Lucien Lottenbach	0	1	2	0	0	2	0	X	5

Sheet C	1	2	3	4	5	6	7	8	Final
(Canada) Brad Gushue	0	2	3	0	4	0	0	X	9
(South Korea) Kim Soo-hyuk	0	0	0	3	0	1	0	X	4

Sheet D	1	2	3	4	5	6	7	8	Final
(United States) Kroy Nernberger	0	0	0	0	1	0	2	X	3
(Sweden) Fredrik Nyman	1	2	1	1	0	1	0	X	6

==== Draw 2 ====
Tuesday, October 16, 5:00 pm

Sheet A	1	2	3	4	5	6	7	8	Final
(South Korea) Kim Soo-hyuk	1	0	2	0	0	0	0	X	3
(Sweden) Fredrik Nyman	0	3	0	1	1	1	2	X	8

Sheet B	1	2	3	4	5	6	7	8	Final
(Canada) Brad Gushue	0	0	2	2	0	0	0	3	7
(United States) Kroy Nernberger	1	1	0	0	0	0	1	0	3

Sheet C	1	2	3	4	5	6	7	8	9	Final
(Russia) Sergey Glukhov	0	2	0	0	2	2	0	0	1	7
(Switzerland) Lucien Lottenbach	2	0	1	1	0	0	1	1	0	6

Sheet D	1	2	3	4	5	6	7	8	Final
(Norway) Thomas Ulsrud	0	2	2	1	3	1	X	X	9
(China) Ma Xiuyue	2	0	0	0	0	0	X	X	2

==== Draw 3 ====
Wednesday, October 17, 1:00 pm

Sheet A	1	2	3	4	5	6	7	8	Final
(Canada) Brad Gushue	0	4	0	4	4	0	X	X	12
(Switzerland) Lucien Lottenbach	2	0	1	0	0	1	X	X	4

Sheet B	1	2	3	4	5	6	7	8	Final
(Norway) Thomas Ulsrud	0	1	1	0	0	3	1	2	8
(Sweden) Fredrik Nyman	2	0	0	1	0	0	0	0	3

Sheet C	1	2	3	4	5	6	7	8	Final
(United States) Kroy Nernberger	1	0	0	0	0	2	0	X	3
(China) Ma Xiuyue	0	2	0	1	1	0	1	X	5

Sheet D	1	2	3	4	5	6	7	8	Final
(Russia) Sergey Glukhov	0	0	0	3	0	2	1	0	6
(South Korea) Kim Soo-hyuk	1	0	0	0	1	0	0	2	4

==== Draw 4 ====
Thursday, October 18, 9:00 am

Sheet A	1	2	3	4	5	6	7	8	Final
(China) Ma Xiuyue	0	1	0	2	0	1	0	X	4
(South Korea) Kim Soo-hyuk	2	0	1	0	1	0	2	X	6

Sheet B	1	2	3	4	5	6	7	8	Final
(United States) Kroy Nernberger	0	1	0	1	0	1	0	X	3
(Russia) Sergey Glukhov	1	0	3	0	1	0	0	X	5

Sheet C	1	2	3	4	5	6	7	8	Final
(Norway) Thomas Ulsrud	0	1	0	0	1	0	1	X	3
(Canada) Brad Gushue	1	0	2	1	0	1	0	X	5

Sheet D	1	2	3	4	5	6	7	8	Final
(Sweden) Fredrik Nyman	0	0	0	1	2	0	1	1	5
(Switzerland) Lucien Lottenbach	1	0	0	0	0	1	0	0	2

==== Draw 5 ====
Thursday, October 18, 5:00 pm

Sheet A	1	2	3	4	5	6	7	8	Final
(United States) Kroy Nernberger	0	1	0	0	1	0	X	X	2
(Norway) Thomas Ulsrud	1	0	3	0	0	3	X	X	7

Sheet B	1	2	3	4	5	6	7	8	Final
(Switzerland) Lucien Lottenbach	2	0	0	0	2	0	2	0	6
(South Korea) Kim Soo-hyuk	0	2	2	1	0	1	0	1	7

Sheet C	1	2	3	4	5	6	7	8	Final
(China) Ma Xiuyue	0	0	0	1	0	1	X	X	2
(Sweden) Fredrik Nyman	2	2	2	0	1	0	X	X	7

Sheet D	1	2	3	4	5	6	7	8	Final
(Canada) Brad Gushue	0	2	3	0	2	3	X	X	10
(Russia) Sergey Glukhov	2	0	0	1	0	0	X	X	3

==== Draw 6 ====
Friday, October 19, 1:00 pm

Sheet A	1	2	3	4	5	6	7	8	Final
(Russia) Sergey Glukhov	0	0	2	1	1	0	0	2	6
(China) Ma Xiuyue	0	1	0	0	0	1	1	0	3

Sheet B	1	2	3	4	5	6	7	8	Final
(Sweden) Fredrik Nyman	0	1	0	2	1	0	4	X	8
(Canada) Brad Gushue	1	0	1	0	0	1	0	X	3

Sheet C	1	2	3	4	5	6	7	8	Final
(Switzerland) Lucien Lottenbach	1	0	0	1	1	0	0	X	3
(Norway) Thomas Ulsrud	0	1	1	0	0	3	1	X	6

Sheet D	1	2	3	4	5	6	7	8	Final
(South Korea) Kim Soo-hyuk	2	0	0	5	1	0	0	1	9
(United States) Kroy Nernberger	0	2	1	0	0	3	1	0	7

==== Draw 7 ====
Saturday, October 20, 9:00 am

Sheet A	1	2	3	4	5	6	7	8	Final
(Switzerland) Lucien Lottenbach	0	1	0	1	0	2	0	0	4
(United States) Kroy Nernberger	0	0	1	0	1	0	2	1	5

Sheet B	1	2	3	4	5	6	7	8	Final
(South Korea) Kim Soo-hyuk	0	0	0	1	0	1	X	X	2
(Norway) Thomas Ulsrud	2	2	1	0	2	0	X	X	7

Sheet C	1	2	3	4	5	6	7	8	9	Final
(Sweden) Fredrik Nyman	2	0	0	1	0	0	2	0	0	5
(Russia) Sergey Glukhov	0	1	0	0	1	1	0	2	1	6

Sheet D	1	2	3	4	5	6	7	8	Final
(China) Ma Xiuyue	0	0	0	1	0	2	0	X	3
(Canada) Brad Gushue	0	2	1	0	1	0	3	X	7

=== Playoffs ===
Semifinals
1	(Canada) Brad Gushue	5
4	(Sweden) Fredrik Nyman	2
2	(Russia) Sergey Glukhov	4
3	(Norway) Thomas Ulsrud	3

Final
1	(Canada) Brad Gushue	8
2	(Russia) Sergey Glukhov	9

Bronze medal game
4	(Sweden) Fredrik Nyman	2
3	(Norway) Thomas Ulsrud	8

==== Semifinals ====
Sunday, October 21, 1:00 pm

Sheet A	1	2	3	4	5	6	7	8	Final
(Canada) Brad Gushue	2	0	1	0	0	0	0	2	5
(Sweden) Fredrik Nyman	0	1	0	0	0	1	0	0	2

Sheet B	1	2	3	4	5	6	7	8	Final
(Russia) Sergey Glukhov	0	0	0	2	0	1	0	1	4
(Norway) Thomas Ulsrud	0	0	0	0	1	0	2	0	3

==== Bronze medal game ====
Monday, October 22, 9:00 am

Sheet D	1	2	3	4	5	6	7	8	Final
(Sweden) Fredrik Nyman	0	0	0	0	2	0	X	X	2
(Norway) Thomas Ulsrud	0	1	2	4	0	1	X	X	8

==== Final ====
Monday, October 22, 9:00 am

Sheet C	1	2	3	4	5	6	7	8	9	Final
(Canada) Brad Gushue	2	0	2	0	2	0	0	2	0	8
(Russia) Sergey Glukhov	0	2	0	3	0	2	1	0	1	9

== Women ==
=== Teams ===
The teams are listed as follows:

Skip	Third	Second	Lead	Alternate	Locale
Annmarie Dubberstein	Cora Farrell	Jenna Burchesky	Allison Howell		Chaska, Minnesota, United States
Madeleine Dupont	Denise Dupont	Julie Høgh	Mathilde Halse		Hvidovre, Denmark
Michèle Jäggi (Fourth)	Ursi Hegner (Skip)	Nina Ledergerber	Claudia Baumann		Uzwil, Switzerland
Sophie Jackson	Naomi Brown	Mili Smith	Sophie Sinclair		Stirling, Scotland
Daniela Jentsch	Emira Abbes	Analena Jentsch	Klara-Hermine Fomm		Füssen, Germany
Jennifer Jones	Kaitlyn Lawes	Jocelyn Peterman	Jill Officer (Note: Officer spared for Dawn McEwen.)		Winnipeg, Manitoba, Canada
Alina Kovaleva	Anastasia Bryzgalova	Uliana Vasilyeva	Ekaterina Kuzmina	Galina Arsenkina	Saint Petersburg, Russia
Mei Jie	Wang Rui	Yao Mingyue	Ma Jingyi		Beijing, China

=== Round-robin standings ===
Final round-robin standings

Key
Teams to Playoffs

Team	W	L	W–L	PF	PA	EW	EL	BE	SE
(Russia) Alina Kovaleva	7	0	–	46	23	28	16	3	9
(Switzerland) Ursi Hegner	4	3	2–0	42	31	26	23	1	9
(Canada) Jennifer Jones	4	3	1–1	42	39	26	25	0	10
(China) Mei Jie	4	3	0–2	45	33	23	22	4	8
(Denmark) Madeleine Dupont	3	4	1–0	44	46	27	25	2	9
(Scotland) Sophie Jackson	3	4	0–1	33	35	21	24	3	6
(Germany) Daniela Jentsch	2	5	–	33	51	21	27	3	3
(United States) Annmarie Dubberstein	1	6	–	22	49	17	27	4	3

=== Round-robin results ===
All draw times are listed in China Standard Time (UTC+08:00).

==== Draw 1 ====
Tuesday, October 16, 1:00 pm

Sheet A	1	2	3	4	5	6	7	8	Final
(United States) Annmarie Dubberstein	0	1	0	1	0	0	X	X	2
(Switzerland) Ursi Hegner	3	0	1	0	2	2	X	X	8

Sheet B	1	2	3	4	5	6	7	8	Final
(Germany) Daniela Jentsch	0	0	0	0	2	0	1	X	3
(Scotland) Sophie Jackson	0	2	1	0	0	4	0	X	7

Sheet C	1	2	3	4	5	6	7	8	9	Final
(China) Mei Jie	0	4	0	0	1	0	1	1	2	9
(Denmark) Madeleine Dupont	2	0	3	1	0	1	0	0	0	7

Sheet D	1	2	3	4	5	6	7	8	Final
(Canada) Jennifer Jones	0	0	2	0	1	0	0	X	3
(Russia) Alina Kovaleva	3	1	0	1	0	2	2	X	9

==== Draw 2 ====
Wednesday, October 17, 9:00 am

Sheet A	1	2	3	4	5	6	7	8	Final
(Denmark) Madeleine Dupont	0	0	2	0	1	0	1	X	4
(Russia) Alina Kovaleva	0	3	0	3	0	2	0	X	8

Sheet B	1	2	3	4	5	6	7	8	Final
(China) Mei Jie	0	1	2	0	0	0	2	0	5
(Canada) Jennifer Jones	3	0	0	1	0	1	0	1	6

Sheet C	1	2	3	4	5	6	7	8	Final
(Switzerland) Ursi Hegner	1	0	0	2	0	1	1	0	5
(Scotland) Sophie Jackson	0	0	4	0	2	0	0	1	7

Sheet D	1	2	3	4	5	6	7	8	Final
(United States) Annmarie Dubberstein	0	2	1	0	1	0	0	1	5
(Germany) Daniela Jentsch	2	0	0	1	0	1	0	0	4

==== Draw 3 ====
Wednesday, October 17, 5:00 pm

Sheet A	1	2	3	4	5	6	7	8	Final
(China) Mei Jie	0	0	2	4	0	1	X	X	7
(Scotland) Sophie Jackson	0	1	0	0	1	0	X	X	2

Sheet B	1	2	3	4	5	6	7	8	Final
(United States) Annmarie Dubberstein	0	1	0	0	2	0	0	0	3
(Russia) Alina Kovaleva	1	0	0	2	0	1	0	1	5

Sheet C	1	2	3	4	5	6	7	8	Final
(Canada) Jennifer Jones	0	0	2	4	1	0	0	4	11
(Germany) Daniela Jentsch	0	3	0	0	0	2	1	0	6

Sheet D	1	2	3	4	5	6	7	8	Final
(Switzerland) Ursi Hegner	2	0	0	0	2	0	1	2	7
(Denmark) Madeleine Dupont	0	2	1	1	0	1	0	0	5

==== Draw 4 ====
Thursday, October 18, 1:00 pm

Sheet A	1	2	3	4	5	6	7	8	Final
(Germany) Daniela Jentsch	2	1	0	2	0	0	0	2	7
(Denmark) Madeleine Dupont	0	0	1	0	3	1	1	0	6

Sheet B	1	2	3	4	5	6	7	8	Final
(Canada) Jennifer Jones	0	1	0	1	1	0	0	1	4
(Switzerland) Ursi Hegner	1	0	2	0	0	1	2	0	6

Sheet C	1	2	3	4	5	6	7	8	Final
(United States) Annmarie Dubberstein	0	1	0	1	0	0	X	X	2
(China) Mei Jie	5	0	1	0	2	3	X	X	11

Sheet D	1	2	3	4	5	6	7	8	Final
(Russia) Alina Kovaleva	0	0	1	1	0	0	2	1	5
(Scotland) Sophie Jackson	0	2	0	0	0	1	0	0	3

==== Draw 5 ====
Friday, October 19, 9:00 am

Sheet A	1	2	3	4	5	6	7	8	Final
(Canada) Jennifer Jones	1	2	2	1	3	0	X	X	9
(United States) Annmarie Dubberstein	0	0	0	0	0	1	X	X	1

Sheet B	1	2	3	4	5	6	7	8	9	Final
(Scotland) Sophie Jackson	0	0	1	0	2	0	2	0	0	5
(Denmark) Madeleine Dupont	0	0	0	2	0	1	0	2	2	7

Sheet C	1	2	3	4	5	6	7	8	Final
(Germany) Daniela Jentsch	0	1	0	1	0	2	0	X	4
(Russia) Alina Kovaleva	2	0	2	0	3	0	1	X	8

Sheet D	1	2	3	4	5	6	7	8	Final
(China) Mei Jie	0	0	1	1	0	0	X	X	2
(Switzerland) Ursi Hegner	1	2	0	0	2	2	X	X	7

==== Draw 6 ====
Friday, October 19, 5:00 pm

Sheet A	1	2	3	4	5	6	7	8	9	Final
(Switzerland) Ursi Hegner	0	0	0	1	0	1	2	1	0	5
(Germany) Daniela Jentsch	2	0	1	0	2	0	0	0	1	6

Sheet B	1	2	3	4	5	6	7	8	Final
(Russia) Alina Kovaleva	0	1	0	2	0	2	1	X	6
(China) Mei Jie	0	0	1	0	1	0	0	X	2

Sheet C	1	2	3	4	5	6	7	8	Final
(Scotland) Sophie Jackson	0	1	1	0	1	0	2	X	5
(United States) Annmarie Dubberstein	1	0	0	1	0	1	0	X	3

Sheet D	1	2	3	4	5	6	7	8	Final
(Denmark) Madeleine Dupont	1	1	0	3	0	2	0	1	8
(Canada) Jennifer Jones	0	0	1	0	2	0	1	0	4

==== Draw 7 ====
Saturday, October 20, 1:00 pm

Sheet A	1	2	3	4	5	6	7	8	Final
(Scotland) Sophie Jackson	0	1	1	0	1	0	0	1	4
(Canada) Jennifer Jones	1	0	0	1	0	1	2	0	5

Sheet B	1	2	3	4	5	6	7	8	Final
(Denmark) Madeleine Dupont	0	0	0	4	0	1	0	2	7
(United States) Annmarie Dubberstein	0	1	4	0	1	0	0	0	6

Sheet C	1	2	3	4	5	6	7	8	Final
(Russia) Alina Kovaleva	0	1	1	1	0	2	0	X	5
(Switzerland) Ursi Hegner	0	0	0	0	3	0	1	X	4

Sheet D	1	2	3	4	5	6	7	8	Final
(Germany) Daniela Jentsch	0	0	0	1	0	2	0	X	3
(China) Mei Jie	0	2	2	0	2	0	3	X	9

=== Playoffs ===
Semifinals
1	(Russia) Alina Kovaleva	5
4	(China) Mei Jie	3
2	(Switzerland) Ursi Hegner	8
3	(Canada) Jennifer Jones	3

Final
1	(Russia) Alina Kovaleva	6
2	(Switzerland) Ursi Hegner	4

Bronze medal game
4	(China) Mei Jie	3
3	(Canada) Jennifer Jones	10

==== Semifinals ====
Sunday, October 21, 5:00 pm

Sheet C	1	2	3	4	5	6	7	8	Final
(Russia) Alina Kovaleva	0	0	1	0	2	1	0	1	5
(China) Mei Jie	1	0	0	1	0	0	1	0	3

Sheet D	1	2	3	4	5	6	7	8	Final
(Switzerland) Ursi Hegner	1	1	3	0	1	0	2	X	8
(Canada) Jennifer Jones	0	0	0	2	0	1	0	X	3

==== Bronze medal game ====
Monday, October 22, 1:00 pm

Sheet A	1	2	3	4	5	6	7	8	Final
(China) Mei Jie	0	0	1	0	0	2	X	X	3
(Canada) Jennifer Jones	4	1	0	2	3	0	X	X	10

==== Final ====
Monday, October 22, 1:00 pm

Sheet B	1	2	3	4	5	6	7	8	9	Final
(Russia) Alina Kovaleva	0	2	1	0	0	1	0	0	2	6
(Switzerland) Ursi Hegner	1	0	0	1	1	0	0	1	0	4
