= 2019 China Open (curling) =

World Curling Tour event

- Host city: Tianjin, China
- Dates: December 13–17
- Men's winner: (South Korea) Team Kim
- Curling club: Uiseong CC, Uiseong, South Korea
- Skip: Kim Chang-min
- Third: Lee Ki-jeong
- Second: Kim Hak-kyun
- Lead: Lee Ki-bok
- Finalist: (United States) Korey Dropkin
- Women's winner: (Russia) Team Kovaleva
- Curling club: Adamant CC, Saint Petersburg, Russia
- Skip: Alina Kovaleva
- Third: Maria Komarova
- Second: Galina Arsenkina
- Lead: Ekaterina Kuzmina
- Finalist: (Canada) Corryn Brown

The 2019 China Open was held from December 13 to 17 in Tianjin, China. It was the third edition of the event. The winning team on both sides received 40,000 of the total 500,000 (CNY). The event was held at the Beijing National Aquatics Centre in preparation for the 2022 Winter Olympics in which the venue hosted the curling events.

On the men's side, the Korean team of Kim Chang-min, Lee Ki-jeong, Kim Hak-kyun and Lee Ki-bok scored one in an extra end to defeat the United States' Korey Dropkin 7–6 in the final. Team Kim qualified through the round robin as the top seeded team with a 6–1 record, only suffering defeat once to Canada's Braden Calvert rink. Team Calvert, along with the United States' Dropkin and the host China's Zou Qiang also qualified for the playoff round. In the semifinal, the Korean team took an early five point lead on China's Zou and hung on for the 6–3 win. In the other Team Dropkin defeated the Calvert rink by the same score. In the final, Team Kim took an early lead at the halfway point but a steal of two by Dropkin in the sixth gave them their first lead of the game. After getting two in the seventh and then forcing the US team to a single in the eighth, the Korean team got one in the extra end to win the match. Team Kim became the second team to win the China Open following the Kim Ji-sun rink who won the women's event in 2013 China Open. Canada's Team Calvert won the bronze medal by a score of 9–4 over Team Zou. The eight team field was rounded out by the defending champions Russia's Sergey Glukhov, the Netherlands Jaap van Dorp, Sweden's Fredrik Nyman and Switzerland's Andrin Schnider.

On the women's side, Russia's Alina Kovaleva rink repeated as champions for the second year in a row, defeating Canda's Corryn Brown rink 4–3 in a tight championship game. Like in 2018, Team Kovaleva, with Kovaleva, Maria Komarova, Galina Arsenkina and Ekaterina Kuzmina finished first in the round robin, this time with a 6–1 record. Their sole defeat came to Korea's Kim Eun-jung, who also qualified for the playoffs with a 5–2 record. Canada's Brown rink along with Switzerland's Irene Schori both also finished 5–2 to qualify for the playoffs. In the semifinal, Team Kovaleva avenged their sole loss by defeating Team Kim 5–3, while Team Brown stole singles in ends seven and eight to steal a 5–4 victory against Team Schori. In the final, the game remained close all the way through, with Team Kovaleva scoring a single in the final end to secure the title for a second year in a row. Team Schori took third place with a 7–4 win over Team Kim. Germany's Daniela Jentsch, host China's Han Yu, the United States' Madison Bear and Japan's Asuka Kanai rounded out the women's field.

== Men ==
=== Teams ===
The teams are listed as follows:

Skip	Third	Second	Lead	Locale
Braden Calvert	Kyle Kurz	Ian McMillan	Rob Gordon	Winnipeg, Manitoba, Canada
Korey Dropkin	Thomas Howell	Mark Fenner	Alex Fenson	Chaska, Minnesota, United States
Sergey Glukhov	Dmitry Mironov	Evgeny Klimov	Anton Kalalb	Sochi, Russia
Kim Chang-min	Lee Ki-jeong	Kim Hak-kyun	Lee Ki-bok	Uiseong, South Korea
Patric Mabergs (Fourth)	Fredrik Nyman (Skip)	Fredrik Carlsen	Johannes Patz	Stockholm, Sweden
Andrin Schnider	Oliver Widmer	Nicola Stoll	Fabian Schmid	St. Gallen, Switzerland
Wouter Gösgens (Fourth)	Jaap van Dorp (Skip)	Laurens Hoekman	Carlo Glasbergen	Zoetermeer, Netherlands
Zou Qiang	Wang Zhiyu	Tian Jiafeng	Xu Jingtao	Beijing, China

=== Round-robin standings ===
Final round-robin standings

Key
Teams to Playoffs

Team	W	L	W–L	PF	PA	EW	EL	BE	SE
(South Korea) Kim Chang-min	6	1	–	46	30	26	25	0	6
(United States) Korey Dropkin	5	2	1–0	48	33	28	20	5	8
(Canada) Braden Calvert	5	2	0–1	43	29	28	19	1	9
(China) Zou Qiang	4	3	–	36	31	22	20	7	6
(Netherlands) Jaap van Dorp	3	4	1–0	33	45	21	31	2	0
(Sweden) Fredrik Nyman	3	4	0–1	31	42	22	23	2	4
(Russia) Sergey Glukhov	2	5	–	36	39	23	22	1	6
(Switzerland) Andrin Schnider	0	7	–	29	53	19	29	4	2

=== Round-robin results ===
All draw times are listed in China Standard Time (UTC+08:00).

==== Draw 1 ====
Friday, December 13, 6:30 pm

Sheet A	1	2	3	4	5	6	7	8	9	Final
(United States) Korey Dropkin	1	0	0	1	1	0	1	1	0	5
(Netherlands) Jaap van Dorp 🔨	0	0	3	0	0	2	0	0	1	6

Sheet B	1	2	3	4	5	6	7	8	Final
(Sweden) Fredrik Nyman	0	0	1	0	0	0	X	X	1
(South Korea) Kim Chang-min 🔨	3	3	0	2	1	0	X	X	9

Sheet C	1	2	3	4	5	6	7	8	Final
(Switzerland) Andrin Schnider	0	0	1	0	0	2	0	X	3
(China) Zou Qiang 🔨	2	2	0	0	2	0	3	X	9

Sheet D	1	2	3	4	5	6	7	8	Final
(Canada) Braden Calvert 🔨	2	0	2	0	2	2	X	X	8
(Russia) Sergey Glukhov	0	2	0	1	0	0	X	X	3

==== Draw 2 ====
Saturday, December 14, 11:00 am

Sheet A	1	2	3	4	5	6	7	8	Final
(China) Zou Qiang 🔨	1	0	0	1	0	2	0	1	5
(Russia) Sergey Glukhov	0	2	0	0	1	0	1	0	4

Sheet B	1	2	3	4	5	6	7	8	Final
(Switzerland) Andrin Schnider	0	0	0	0	2	0	0	X	2
(Canada) Braden Calvert 🔨	1	0	0	1	0	2	1	X	5

Sheet C	1	2	3	4	5	6	7	8	Final
(Netherlands) Jaap van Dorp 🔨	3	0	0	0	1	0	1	0	5
(South Korea) Kim Chang-min	0	1	1	1	0	1	0	4	8

Sheet D	1	2	3	4	5	6	7	8	Final
(United States) Korey Dropkin 🔨	0	1	2	0	0	2	0	1	6
(Sweden) Fredrik Nyman	0	0	0	2	1	0	2	0	5

==== Draw 3 ====
Saturday, December 14, 7:00 pm

Sheet A	1	2	3	4	5	6	7	8	Final
(Switzerland) Andrin Schnider	2	0	1	0	1	0	1	0	5
(South Korea) Kim Chang-min 🔨	0	1	0	2	0	2	0	1	6

Sheet B	1	2	3	4	5	6	7	8	Final
(United States) Korey Dropkin 🔨	0	5	0	1	0	3	X	X	9
(Russia) Sergey Glukhov	1	0	2	0	1	0	X	X	4

Sheet C	1	2	3	4	5	6	7	8	Final
(Canada) Braden Calvert 🔨	2	0	3	0	0	1	2	X	8
(Sweden) Fredrik Nyman	0	1	0	1	2	0	0	X	4

Sheet D	1	2	3	4	5	6	7	8	Final
(Netherlands) Jaap van Dorp 🔨	0	1	0	0	1	0	0	0	2
(China) Zou Qiang	1	0	0	1	0	1	2	2	7

==== Draw 4 ====
Sunday, December 15, 11:00 am

Sheet A	1	2	3	4	5	6	7	8	Final
(Sweden) Fredrik Nyman 🔨	1	0	0	0	0	1	0	3	5
(China) Zou Qiang	0	0	0	0	2	0	2	0	4

Sheet B	1	2	3	4	5	6	7	8	Final
(Canada) Braden Calvert 🔨	2	0	3	0	1	0	2	X	8
(Netherlands) Jaap van Dorp	0	1	0	1	0	1	0	X	3

Sheet C	1	2	3	4	5	6	7	8	Final
(United States) Korey Dropkin 🔨	1	0	0	3	0	3	0	1	8
(Switzerland) Andrin Schnider	0	2	0	0	2	0	2	0	6

Sheet D	1	2	3	4	5	6	7	8	Final
(Russia) Sergey Glukhov 🔨	1	1	0	1	0	1	0	X	4
(South Korea) Kim Chang-min	0	0	2	0	3	0	2	X	7

==== Draw 5 ====
Sunday, December 15, 7:00 pm

Sheet A	1	2	3	4	5	6	7	8	Final
(Canada) Braden Calvert	1	0	1	0	0	1	0	X	3
(United States) Korey Dropkin 🔨	0	1	0	2	2	0	2	X	7

Sheet B	1	2	3	4	5	6	7	8	Final
(South Korea) Kim Chang-min 🔨	0	1	1	0	2	2	X	X	6
(China) Zou Qiang	1	0	0	1	0	0	X	X	2

Sheet C	1	2	3	4	5	6	7	8	Final
(Sweden) Fredrik Nyman	0	2	1	0	0	2	0	1	6
(Russia) Sergey Glukhov 🔨	0	0	0	2	0	0	2	0	4

Sheet D	1	2	3	4	5	6	7	8	Final
(Switzerland) Andrin Schnider	0	1	1	0	2	0	2	0	6
(Netherlands) Jaap van Dorp 🔨	3	0	0	2	0	3	0	1	9

==== Draw 6 ====
Monday, December 16, 11:00 am

Sheet A	1	2	3	4	5	6	7	8	Final
(Netherlands) Jaap van Dorp 🔨	2	0	1	0	2	0	1	0	6
(Sweden) Fredrik Nyman	0	1	0	1	0	1	0	1	4

Sheet B	1	2	3	4	5	6	7	8	Final
(Russia) Sergey Glukhov	0	1	2	1	0	3	3	X	10
(Switzerland) Andrin Schnider 🔨	1	0	0	0	1	0	0	X	2

Sheet C	1	2	3	4	5	6	7	8	9	Final
(South Korea) Kim Chang-min 🔨	4	0	1	0	0	1	0	0	1	7
(United States) Korey Dropkin	0	1	0	1	1	0	2	1	0	6

Sheet D	1	2	3	4	5	6	7	8	Final
(China) Zou Qiang 🔨	0	3	1	0	0	2	0	1	7
(Canada) Braden Calvert	2	0	0	0	1	0	1	0	4

==== Draw 7 ====
Monday, December 16, 7:00 pm

Sheet A	1	2	3	4	5	6	7	8	Final
(South Korea) Kim Chang-min	0	1	0	0	0	2	0	0	3
(Canada) Braden Calvert 🔨	1	0	1	1	2	0	1	1	7

Sheet B	1	2	3	4	5	6	7	8	Final
(China) Zou Qiang	0	0	2	0	0	0	0	0	2
(United States) Korey Dropkin 🔨	0	2	0	0	0	2	0	3	7

Sheet C	1	2	3	4	5	6	7	8	Final
(Russia) Sergey Glukhov 🔨	3	0	2	0	1	0	1	X	7
(Netherlands) Jaap van Dorp	0	0	0	1	0	1	0	X	2

Sheet D	1	2	3	4	5	6	7	8	9	Final
(Sweden) Fredrik Nyman 🔨	1	0	0	3	0	0	1	0	1	6
(Switzerland) Andrin Schnider	0	0	2	0	0	1	0	2	0	5

=== Playoffs ===
Semifinals
1	(South Korea) Kim Chang-min	6
4	(China) Zou Qiang	3
2	(United States) Korey Dropkin	6
3	(Canada) Braden Calvert	3

Final
1	(South Korea) Kim Chang-min	7
2	(United States) Korey Dropkin	6

Bronze medal game
4	(China) Zou Qiang	4
3	(Canada) Braden Calvert	9

==== Semifinals ====
Tuesday, December 17, 8:30 am

Sheet A	1	2	3	4	5	6	7	8	Final
(South Korea) Kim Chang-min 🔨	0	2	2	1	0	1	0	X	6
(China) Zou Qiang	0	0	0	0	2	0	1	X	3

Sheet B	1	2	3	4	5	6	7	8	Final
(United States) Korey Dropkin 🔨	0	1	0	3	1	0	1	X	6
(Canada) Braden Calvert	0	0	1	0	0	2	0	X	3

==== Bronze medal game ====
Tuesday, December 17, 1:00 pm

Sheet D	1	2	3	4	5	6	7	8	Final
(China) Zou Qiang	0	0	1	0	2	0	1	0	4
(Canada) Braden Calvert 🔨	1	1	0	2	0	1	0	4	9

==== Final ====
Tuesday, December 17, 1:00 pm

Sheet C	1	2	3	4	5	6	7	8	9	Final
(South Korea) Kim Chang-min 🔨	2	0	1	1	0	0	2	0	1	7
(United States) Korey Dropkin	0	1	0	0	2	2	0	1	0	6

== Women ==
=== Teams ===
The teams are listed as follows:

Skip	Third	Second	Lead	Locale
Madison Bear	Lexi Lanigan	Jenna Burchesky	Emily Quello	(United States) Saint Paul, Minnesota
Corryn Brown	Erin Pincott	Dezaray Hawes	Ashley Klymchuk	Kamloops, British Columbia, Canada
Han Yu	Zhang Lijun	Jiang Xindi	Zhao Ruiyi	Beijing, China
Daniela Jentsch	Emira Abbes	Klara-Hermine Fomm	Analena Jentsch	Füssen, Germany
Asuka Kanai	Ami Enami	Miyu Ueno	Mone Ryokawa	Nagano, Japan
Kim Eun-jung	Kim Kyeong-ae	Kim Seon-yeong	Kim Yeong-mi	Uiseong, South Korea
Alina Kovaleva	Maria Komarova	Galina Arsenkina	Ekaterina Kuzmina	Saint Petersburg, Russia
Irene Schori	Lara Stocker	Roxane Héritier	Isabelle Maillard	Limmattal, Switzerland

=== Round-robin standings ===
Final round-robin standings

Key
Teams to Playoffs

Team	W	L	W–L	PF	PA	EW	EL	BE	SE
(Russia) Alina Kovaleva	6	1	–	46	26	25	17	5	8
(Switzerland) Irene Schori	5	2	2–0	40	29	20	19	7	7
(Canada) Corryn Brown	5	2	1–1	42	34	20	23	1	4
(South Korea) Kim Eun-jung	5	2	0–2	46	30	27	16	4	11
(Germany) Daniela Jentsch	3	4	–	38	39	25	22	4	8
(China) Han Yu	2	5	–	27	37	19	26	2	4
(United States) Madison Bear	1	6	1–0	26	48	17	26	2	5
(Japan) Asuka Kanai	1	6	0–1	28	50	21	25	1	5

=== Round-robin results ===
All draw times are listed in China Standard Time (UTC+08:00).

==== Draw 1 ====
Friday, December 13, 2:45 pm

Sheet A	1	2	3	4	5	6	7	8	Final
(Japan) Asuka Kanai	1	0	0	0	1	1	0	X	3
(Russia) Alina Kovaleva 🔨	0	1	3	2	0	0	3	X	9

Sheet B	1	2	3	4	5	6	7	8	Final
(China) Han Yu 🔨	0	2	0	0	2	1	1	X	6
(United States) Madison Bear	1	0	1	1	0	0	0	X	3

Sheet C	1	2	3	4	5	6	7	8	Final
(Canada) Corryn Brown	0	0	2	3	0	0	2	0	7
(South Korea) Kim Eun-jung 🔨	0	1	0	0	2	1	0	1	5

Sheet D	1	2	3	4	5	6	7	8	Final
(Switzerland) Irene Schori	0	0	0	2	1	0	0	0	3
(Germany) Daniela Jentsch 🔨	0	0	1	0	0	1	2	1	5

==== Draw 2 ====
Saturday, December 14, 7:00 am

Sheet A	1	2	3	4	5	6	7	8	Final
(South Korea) Kim Eun-jung	0	3	0	2	3	0	X	X	8
(Germany) Daniela Jentsch 🔨	0	0	1	0	0	1	X	X	2

Sheet B	1	2	3	4	5	6	7	8	Final
(Canada) Corryn Brown	0	0	0	0	2	0	0	0	2
(Switzerland) Irene Schori 🔨	0	0	0	2	0	0	2	1	5

Sheet C	1	2	3	4	5	6	7	8	Final
(Russia) Alina Kovaleva 🔨	4	2	1	0	1	0	X	X	8
(United States) Madison Bear	0	0	0	2	0	1	X	X	3

Sheet D	1	2	3	4	5	6	7	8	Final
(Japan) Asuka Kanai 🔨	1	0	1	0	2	0	1	X	5
(China) Han Yu	0	0	0	1	0	1	0	X	2

==== Draw 3 ====
Saturday, December 14, 3:00 pm

Sheet A	1	2	3	4	5	6	7	8	Final
(Canada) Corryn Brown 🔨	1	2	0	3	4	0	X	X	10
(United States) Madison Bear	0	0	1	0	0	2	X	X	3

Sheet B	1	2	3	4	5	6	7	8	Final
(Japan) Asuka Kanai	0	0	2	0	1	1	0	0	4
(Germany) Daniela Jentsch 🔨	1	1	0	2	0	0	0	2	6

Sheet C	1	2	3	4	5	6	7	8	Final
(Switzerland) Irene Schori 🔨	2	3	0	1	0	1	0	X	7
(China) Han Yu	0	0	2	0	2	0	1	X	5

Sheet D	1	2	3	4	5	6	7	8	Final
(Russia) Alina Kovaleva	0	0	1	0	0	3	0	X	4
(South Korea) Kim Eun-jung 🔨	0	2	0	4	2	0	1	X	9

==== Draw 4 ====
Sunday, December 15, 7:00 am

Sheet A	1	2	3	4	5	6	7	8	Final
(China) Han Yu	0	0	0	2	0	0	2	1	5
(South Korea) Kim Eun-jung 🔨	3	1	1	0	0	1	0	0	6

Sheet B	1	2	3	4	5	6	7	8	Final
(Switzerland) Irene Schori	0	0	0	2	0	0	1	0	3
(Russia) Alina Kovaleva 🔨	0	2	0	0	0	3	0	1	6

Sheet C	1	2	3	4	5	6	7	8	Final
(Japan) Asuka Kanai 🔨	2	0	1	0	1	0	2	X	6
(Canada) Corryn Brown	0	3	0	2	0	3	0	X	8

Sheet D	1	2	3	4	5	6	7	8	Final
(Germany) Daniela Jentsch	0	3	2	1	0	3	X	X	9
(United States) Madison Bear 🔨	2	0	0	0	2	0	X	X	4

==== Draw 5 ====
Sunday, December 15, 3:00 pm

Sheet A	1	2	3	4	5	6	7	8	Final
(Switzerland) Irene Schori 🔨	0	2	3	0	0	3	0	X	8
(Japan) Asuka Kanai	0	0	0	1	1	0	2	X	4

Sheet B	1	2	3	4	5	6	7	8	Final
(United States) Madison Bear	0	0	0	1	0	0	0	X	1
(South Korea) Kim Eun-jung 🔨	1	0	1	0	2	1	1	X	6

Sheet C	1	2	3	4	5	6	7	8	Final
(China) Han Yu 🔨	0	0	1	0	3	1	0	0	5
(Germany) Daniela Jentsch	0	1	0	1	0	0	1	1	4

Sheet D	1	2	3	4	5	6	7	8	Final
(Canada) Corryn Brown	0	0	1	0	0	0	X	X	1
(Russia) Alina Kovaleva 🔨	1	1	0	0	3	1	X	X	6

==== Draw 6 ====
Monday, December 16, 7:00 am

Sheet A	1	2	3	4	5	6	7	8	Final
(Russia) Alina Kovaleva	0	3	0	0	0	1	2	X	6
(China) Han Yu 🔨	1	0	1	0	0	0	0	X	2

Sheet B	1	2	3	4	5	6	7	8	Final
(Germany) Daniela Jentsch	2	0	2	0	1	0	2	0	7
(Canada) Corryn Brown 🔨	0	1	0	2	0	4	0	1	8

Sheet C	1	2	3	4	5	6	7	8	Final
(United States) Madison Bear 🔨	1	0	2	0	2	0	2	X	7
(Japan) Asuka Kanai	0	2	0	0	0	1	0	X	3

Sheet D	1	2	3	4	5	6	7	8	Final
(South Korea) Kim Eun-jung 🔨	0	0	1	0	1	0	X	X	2
(Switzerland) Irene Schori	0	2	0	1	0	5	X	X	8

==== Draw 7 ====
Monday, December 16, 3:00 pm

Sheet A	1	2	3	4	5	6	7	8	Final
(United States) Madison Bear 🔨	0	2	0	1	2	0	0	0	5
(Switzerland) Irene Schori	0	0	0	0	0	2	2	2	6

Sheet B	1	2	3	4	5	6	7	8	Final
(South Korea) Kim Eun-jung 🔨	2	0	1	1	0	4	2	X	10
(Japan) Asuka Kanai	0	2	0	0	1	0	0	X	3

Sheet C	1	2	3	4	5	6	7	8	Final
(Germany) Daniela Jentsch	0	1	0	3	0	0	1	0	5
(Russia) Alina Kovaleva 🔨	1	0	1	0	2	2	0	1	7

Sheet D	1	2	3	4	5	6	7	8	Final
(China) Han Yu	0	1	0	0	1	0	0	X	2
(Canada) Corryn Brown 🔨	1	0	0	2	0	2	1	X	6

=== Playoffs ===
Semifinals
1	(Russia) Alina Kovaleva	5
4	(South Korea) Kim Eun-jung	3
2	(Switzerland) Irene Schori	4
3	(Canada) Corryn Brown	5

Final
1	(Russia) Alina Kovaleva	4
3	(Canada) Corryn Brown	3

Bronze medal game
4	(South Korea) Kim Eun-jung	4
2	(Switzerland) Irene Schori	7

==== Semifinals ====
Tuesday, December 17, 8:30 am

Sheet C	1	2	3	4	5	6	7	8	Final
(Russia) Alina Kovaleva 🔨	2	0	0	1	0	1	0	1	5
(South Korea) Kim Eun-jung	0	0	0	0	1	0	2	0	3

Sheet D	1	2	3	4	5	6	7	8	Final
(Switzerland) Irene Schori 🔨	0	1	0	0	3	0	0	0	4
(Canada) Corryn Brown	0	0	0	1	0	2	1	1	5

==== Bronze medal game ====
Tuesday, December 17, 1:00 pm

Sheet A	1	2	3	4	5	6	7	8	Final
(South Korea) Kim Eun-jung	0	2	1	0	0	1	0	0	4
(Switzerland) Irene Schori 🔨	2	0	0	1	1	0	2	1	7

==== Final ====
Tuesday, December 17, 1:00 pm

Sheet B	1	2	3	4	5	6	7	8	Final
(Russia) Alina Kovaleva 🔨	0	1	1	0	0	1	0	1	4
(Canada) Corryn Brown	0	0	0	2	0	0	1	0	3
