= 2015 Pacific-Asia Junior Curling Championships =

- Host city: Naseby, New Zealand
- Arena: Maniototo Curling International Rink
- Dates: January 19–24
- Men's winner: South Korea
- Skip: Lee Ki-jeong
- Third: Lee Ki-bok
- Second: Kim Tae-geun
- Lead: Son Seung-jo
- Alternate: Kim Chi-goo
- Finalist: China (Wang Jinbo)
- Women's winner: South Korea
- Skip: Kim Eun-bi
- Third: Hyoung Bo-ram
- Second: Hwang Su-bin
- Lead: Shin Ga-yeong
- Alternate: Jeon Jeong-hyeon
- Finalist: China (Jiang Yilun)

The 2015 Pacific-Asia Junior Curling Championships were held from January 19 to 24 in Naseby, New Zealand. The two South Korean teams, top finishers of each tournament, advanced to the 2015 World Junior Curling Championships in Tallinn, Estonia.

== Men ==
=== Teams ===
Country	Skip	Third	Second	Lead	Alternate
Australia	Max Thomas	Dean Hewitt	Mitchell Thomas	Grant Hamsey	Tyler Hogan
China	Wang Jinbo	Shao Zhilin	Xu Jingtao	Li Jiaqi	Zhao Ran
Japan	Ryuji Shibaya	Hiromu Otani	Yuuto Kamada	Hiromasa Yamamoto	Naoto Kirigane
New Zealand	Simon Neilson	Luke Steele	Matthew Neilson	Josh Fogo	Josh Whyte
South Korea	Lee Ki-jeong	Lee Ki-bok	Kim Tae-geun	Son Seung-Jo	Kim Chi-goo

=== Round-robin standings ===
Key
Teams to Playoffs

Country	Skip	W	L
China	Wang Jinbo	7	1
South Korea	Lee Ki-jeong	6	2
Japan	Ryuji Shibaya	3	5
Australia	Max Thomas	2	6
New Zealand	Simon Neilson	2	6

=== Round-robin results ===
All draw times are listed in New Zealand Standard Time (UTC+8).

==== Draw 1 ====
Monday, January 19, 10:00

Sheet A	1	2	3	4	5	6	7	8	9	10	Final
New Zealand (Neilson)	0	0	0	1	0	0	0	1	0	1	3
Australia (Thomas) 🔨	1	0	0	0	0	1	2	0	2	0	6

Sheet B	1	2	3	4	5	6	7	8	9	10	Final
South Korea (Lee)	0	2	0	0	0	0	1	0	1	X	4
China (Wang) 🔨	1	0	0	1	3	1	0	1	0	X	7

==== Draw 2 ====
Monday, January 19, 16:00

Sheet C	1	2	3	4	5	6	7	8	9	10	Final
China (Wang)	2	3	0	3	1	0	X	X	X	X	9
New Zealand (Neilson) 🔨	0	0	1	0	0	1	X	X	X	X	2

Sheet D	1	2	3	4	5	6	7	8	9	10	Final
Japan (Shibaya)	0	0	0	0	0	3	0	0	0	X	3
South Korea (Lee) 🔨	0	0	2	0	1	0	0	1	3	X	7

==== Draw 3 ====
Tuesday, January 20, 10:00

Sheet A	1	2	3	4	5	6	7	8	9	10	Final
Japan (Shibaya)	1	1	0	0	2	0	0	X	X	X	4
China (Wang) 🔨	0	0	3	2	0	3	5	X	X	X	13

Sheet C	1	2	3	4	5	6	7	8	9	10	Final
South Korea (Lee)	1	0	1	0	3	0	2	0	0	X	7
Australia (Thomas) 🔨	0	3	0	2	0	2	0	3	1	X	11

==== Draw 4 ====
Tuesday, January 20, 16:00

Sheet B	1	2	3	4	5	6	7	8	9	10	Final
New Zealand (Neilson)	0	2	0	1	0	0	0	1	0	0	4
Japan (Shibaya) 🔨	1	0	2	0	2	1	0	0	0	1	7

Sheet D	1	2	3	4	5	6	7	8	9	10	Final
Australia (Thomas)	0	0	0	1	0	0	1	0	X	X	2
China (Wang) 🔨	1	3	3	0	2	0	0	1	X	X	10

==== Draw 5 ====
Wednesday, January 21, 10:00

Sheet A	1	2	3	4	5	6	7	8	9	10	Final
Australia (Thomas)	0	1	0	0	1	0	0	X	X	X	2
Japan (Shibaya) 🔨	1	0	1	3	0	1	5	X	X	X	11

Sheet C	1	2	3	4	5	6	7	8	9	10	Final
New Zealand (Neilson)	0	2	0	0	1	0	1	0	1	X	5
South Korea (Lee) 🔨	2	0	3	1	0	1	0	1	0	X	8

==== Draw 6 ====
Wednesday, January 21, 16:00

Sheet A	1	2	3	4	5	6	7	8	9	10	Final
China (Wang)	1	0	2	0	0	2	0	0	0	0	5
South Korea (Lee) 🔨	0	1	0	0	0	0	1	2	2	1	7

Sheet B	1	2	3	4	5	6	7	8	9	10	Final
Australia (Thomas)	0	1	0	0	1	0	2	0	0	0	4
New Zealand (Neilson) 🔨	1	0	1	0	0	1	0	1	0	1	5

==== Draw 7 ====
Thursday, January 22, 10:00

Sheet B	1	2	3	4	5	6	7	8	9	10	11	Final
Japan (Shibaya) 🔨	1	0	0	2	0	0	0	2	0	1	0	6
South Korea (Lee)	0	2	0	0	1	2	0	0	1	0	1	7

Sheet D	1	2	3	4	5	6	7	8	9	10	Final
China (Wang) 🔨	1	0	3	1	2	0	3	0	X	X	10
New Zealand (Neilson)	0	2	0	0	0	1	0	1	X	X	4

==== Draw 8 ====
Thursday, January 22, 16:00

Sheet C	1	2	3	4	5	6	7	8	9	10	Final
Japan (Shibaya) 🔨	0	1	0	1	0	1	0	3	0	1	7
China (Wang)	3	0	1	0	2	0	1	0	1	0	8

Sheet D	1	2	3	4	5	6	7	8	9	10	Final
South Korea (Lee) 🔨	1	0	1	1	1	0	2	0	2	X	8
Australia (Thomas)	0	1	0	0	0	1	0	1	0	X	3

==== Draw 9 ====
Friday, January 23, 9:00

Sheet B	1	2	3	4	5	6	7	8	9	10	Final
China (Wang)	0	2	0	1	0	2	0	1	1	X	7
Australia (Thomas) 🔨	1	0	2	0	0	0	1	0	0	X	4

Sheet D	1	2	3	4	5	6	7	8	9	10	11	Final
New Zealand (Neilson) 🔨	1	0	0	1	0	1	0	1	1	0	1	6
Japan (Shibaya)	0	2	0	0	1	0	1	0	0	1	0	5

==== Draw 10 ====
Monday, January 23, 14:30

Sheet A	1	2	3	4	5	6	7	8	9	10	Final
South Korea (Lee)	0	0	2	0	0	2	2	0	2	X	8
New Zealand (Neilson) 🔨	0	1	0	1	0	0	0	1	0	X	3

Sheet C	1	2	3	4	5	6	7	8	9	10	Final
Australia (Thomas) 🔨	0	0	0	0	0	1	0	2	0	X	3
Japan (Shibaya)	1	1	1	2	0	0	1	0	1	X	7

=== Playoffs ===
Semifinal			Final
			1	China	4
2	South Korea	5	2	South Korea	5
3	Japan	3

==== Semifinal ====
Saturday, January 24, 9:00

Team	1	2	3	4	5	6	7	8	9	10	Final
South Korea (Lee) 🔨	1	0	2	0	0	1	0	0	0	1	5
Japan (Shibaya)	0	0	0	0	1	0	0	1	1	0	3

==== Final ====
Saturday, January 24, 14:30

Team	1	2	3	4	5	6	7	8	9	10	Final
China (Wang) 🔨	0	0	0	0	1	2	0	1	0	0	4
South Korea (Lee)	0	1	0	0	0	0	2	0	0	2	5

== Women ==
=== Teams ===
Country	Skip	Third	Second	Lead	Alternate
Australia	Victoria Wilson	Samantha Jeffs	Tahli Gill	Kirby Gill	Ivy Militano
China	Jiang Yilun	Wang Rui	Zhao Xiyang	Ma Jingyi	Jiang Xindi
Japan	Tamami Naito	Eri Araki	Risa Kusumoto	Riho Zaikan	Hinako Hase
New Zealand	Eleanor Adviento	Waverley Taylor	Jessica Smith	Holly Thompson	Eloise Pointon
South Korea	Kim Eun-bi	Hyoung Bo-ram	Hwang Su-bin	Shin Ga-yeong	Jeon Jeong-hyeon

=== Round-robin standings ===
Key
Teams to Playoffs
Teams to Tie-Breaker

Country	Skip	W	L
China	Jiang Yilun	8	0
South Korea	Kim Eun-bi	6	2
New Zealand	Eleanor Adviento	3	5
Japan	Tamami Naito	3	5
Australia	Victoria Wilson	0	8

=== Round-robin results ===
All draw times are listed in New Zealand Standard Time (UTC+8).

==== Draw 1 ====
Monday, January 19, 10:00

Sheet D	1	2	3	4	5	6	7	8	9	10	Final
Australia (Wilson)	0	1	0	1	0	0	0	0	X	X	2
New Zealand (Adviento) 🔨	5	0	1	0	2	1	5	3	X	X	17

Sheet C	1	2	3	4	5	6	7	8	9	10	Final
Japan (Naito)	1	0	0	5	0	1	0	1	0	X	8
South Korea (Kim) 🔨	0	3	1	0	2	0	3	0	4	X	13

==== Draw 2 ====
Monday, January 19, 16:00

Sheet A	1	2	3	4	5	6	7	8	9	10	Final
China (Jiang)	0	2	0	5	2	3	3	X	X	X	15
Japan (Naito) 🔨	0	0	1	0	0	0	0	X	X	X	1

Sheet B	1	2	3	4	5	6	7	8	9	10	Final
South Korea (Kim)	4	3	1	2	2	0	4	X	X	X	16
Australia (Wilson) 🔨	0	0	0	0	0	1	0	X	X	X	1

==== Draw 3 ====
Tuesday, January 20, 10:00

Sheet B	1	2	3	4	5	6	7	8	9	10	Final
Japan (Naito)	0	1	0	3	0	1	0	1	0	1	7
New Zealand (Adviento) 🔨	1	0	1	0	1	0	1	0	2	0	6

Sheet D	1	2	3	4	5	6	7	8	9	10	Final
China (Jiang)	0	1	0	1	1	0	2	3	0	1	9
South Korea (Kim) 🔨	1	0	2	0	0	3	0	0	1	0	7

==== Draw 4 ====
Tuesday, January 20, 16:00

Sheet A	1	2	3	4	5	6	7	8	9	10	Final
New Zealand (Adviento)	0	1	0	1	0	2	0	3	0	X	7
South Korea (Kim) 🔨	2	0	2	0	1	0	2	0	3	X	10

Sheet C	1	2	3	4	5	6	7	8	9	10	Final
Australia (Wilson)	0	1	0	0	1	0	X	X	X	X	2
China (Jiang) 🔨	5	0	4	2	0	4	X	X	X	X	15

==== Draw 5 ====
Wednesday, January 21, 10:00

Sheet B	1	2	3	4	5	6	7	8	9	10	Final
Australia (Wilson)	0	1	0	0	2	0	X	X	X	X	3
Japan (Naito) 🔨	6	0	4	1	0	3	X	X	X	X	14

Sheet D	1	2	3	4	5	6	7	8	9	10	Final
New Zealand (Adviento)	0	0	0	1	0	1	0	0	X	X	2
China (Jiang) 🔨	1	2	1	0	2	0	0	1	X	X	7

==== Draw 6 ====
Wednesday, January 21, 16:00

Sheet C	1	2	3	4	5	6	7	8	9	10	Final
New Zealand (Adviento)	0	1	1	3	2	4	0	0	3	X	14
Australia (Wilson) 🔨	1	0	0	0	0	0	2	1	0	X	4

Sheet D	1	2	3	4	5	6	7	8	9	10	Final
South Korea (Kim)	1	0	1	0	1	1	0	0	3	X	7
Japan (Naito) 🔨	0	1	0	1	0	0	1	0	0	X	3

==== Draw 7 ====
Thursday, January 22, 10:00

Sheet A	1	2	3	4	5	6	7	8	9	10	Final
South Korea (Kim) 🔨	2	1	1	5	0	3	0	X	X	X	12
Australia (Wilson)	0	0	0	0	2	0	1	X	X	X	3

Sheet C	1	2	3	4	5	6	7	8	9	10	Final
China (Jiang) 🔨	4	2	0	0	0	0	1	0	1	0	8
Japan (Naito)	0	0	1	1	1	1	0	1	0	1	6

==== Draw 8 ====
Thursday, January 22, 16:00

Sheet A	1	2	3	4	5	6	7	8	9	10	Final
Japan (Naito) 🔨	0	1	0	0	2	0	1	3	0	X	7
New Zealand (Adviento)	0	0	2	2	0	4	0	0	3	X	11

Sheet B	1	2	3	4	5	6	7	8	9	10	Final
China (Jiang) 🔨	1	0	0	4	2	0	0	3	X	X	10
South Korea (Kim)	0	0	2	0	0	1	1	0	X	X	4

==== Draw 9 ====
Friday, January 23, 9:00

Sheet A	1	2	3	4	5	6	7	8	9	10	Final
Australia (Wilson) 🔨	0	0	0	1	0	0	X	X	X	X	1
China (Jiang)	2	2	3	0	6	1	X	X	X	X	14

Sheet C	1	2	3	4	5	6	7	8	9	10	Final
South Korea (Kim)	1	0	1	1	0	0	2	0	0	1	6
New Zealand (Adviento) 🔨	0	1	0	0	1	0	0	1	2	0	5

==== Draw 10 ====
Monday, January 23, 14:30

Sheet A	1	2	3	4	5	6	7	8	9	10	Final
New Zealand (Adviento) 🔨	0	0	2	1	1	0	1	0	X	X	5
China (Jiang)	1	4	0	0	0	2	0	2	X	X	9

Sheet C	1	2	3	4	5	6	7	8	9	10	Final
Japan (Naito)	1	1	0	0	3	0	2	0	0	X	7
Australia (Wilson) 🔨	0	0	1	1	0	1	0	1	0	X	4

==== Tie-Breaker ====
Monday, January 23, 19:30

Team	1	2	3	4	5	6	7	8	9	10	Final
Japan (Naito)	0	0	1	0	0	1	0	1	0	X	3
New Zealand (Adviento) 🔨	0	2	0	1	1	0	1	0	3	X	8

=== Playoffs ===
Semifinal			Final
			1	China	4
2	South Korea	7	2	South Korea	5
3	New Zealand	3

==== Semifinal ====
Saturday, January 24, 9:00

Team	1	2	3	4	5	6	7	8	9	10	Final
South Korea (Kim) 🔨	1	0	0	2	0	0	0	2	2	X	7
New Zealand (Adviento)	0	1	1	0	1	0	0	0	0	X	3

==== Final ====
Saturday, January 24, 14:30

Team	1	2	3	4	5	6	7	8	9	10	11	Final
China (Jiang) 🔨	1	0	0	0	2	0	0	0	0	1	0	4
South Korea (Kim)	0	0	0	2	0	0	1	0	1	0	1	5
