= 2013 China Open =

2013 China Open may refer to:

- 2013 China Open (curling), a curling tournament
- 2013 China Open (snooker), a snooker tournament
- 2013 China Open (tennis), a tennis tournament
- 2013 China Open Super Series Premier, an edition of the China Open badminton tournament
