= China Open (curling) =

World Curling Tour event

- Established: 2013
- Host city: Tianjin, China
- Men's purse: 250,000 CNY (2019)
- Women's purse: 250,000 CNY (2019)

Current champions (2019)
- Men: (South Korea) Kim Chang-min
- Women: (Russia) Alina Kovaleva

Current edition
- 2019 China Open (curling)

The China Open is an annual bonspiel, or curling tournament, held in Tianjin, China, however, in 2018, the event was held in Chongqing. The original event was held in 2013. The tournament is held in a round robin format. Over the three years that the tournament has been held, there has been teams from 14 different countries that have participated: Canada, China, Denmark, Germany, Japan, South Korea, Netherlands, New Zealand, Norway, Russia, Scotland, Sweden, Switzerland and United States.

== Past Champions ==
=== Men ===
Year	Winner	Runner-up	Purse
2013	(Canada) Mike McEwen, B. J. Neufeld, Matt Wozniak, Denni Neufeld	(China) Liu Rui, Zang Jialiang, Xu Xiaoming, Ba Dexin	
2018	(Russia) Sergey Glukhov, Artur Ali, Dmitry Mironov, Anton Kalalb	(Canada) Brad Gushue, Mark Nichols, Brett Gallant, Geoff Walker	$100,000 (US)
2019	(South Korea) Kim Chang-min, Lee Ki-jeong, Kim Hak-kyun, Lee Ki-bok	(United States) Korey Dropkin, Thomas Howell, Mark Fenner, Alex Fenson	250,000 (CNY)

=== Women ===
Year	Winner	Runner-up	Purse
2013	(South Korea) Kim Ji-sun, Gim Un-chi, Shin Mi-sung, Lee Seul-bee	(Canada) Chelsea Carey, Kristy McDonald, Kristen Foster, Lindsay Titheridge	
2018	(Russia) Alina Kovaleva, Anastasia Bryzgalova, Uliana Vasilyeva, Ekaterina Kuzmina	(Switzerland) Michèle Jäggi (Fourth), Ursi Hegner (Skip), Nina Ledergerber, Claudia Baumann	$100,000 (US)
2019	(Russia) Alina Kovaleva, Maria Komarova, Galina Arsenkina, Ekaterina Kuzmina	(Canada) Corryn Brown, Erin Pincott, Dezaray Hawes, Ashley Klymchuk	250,000 (CNY)
