= 2019 World Women's Curling Championship =

- Host city: Silkeborg, Denmark
- Arena: Silkeborg Sportscenter
- Dates: 16–24 March
- Winner: Switzerland
- Curling club: CC Aarau, Aarau
- Skip: Silvana Tirinzoni
- Fourth: Alina Pätz
- Second: Esther Neuenschwander
- Lead: Melanie Barbezat
- Alternate: Marisa Winkelhausen
- Coach: Manuela Netzer
- Finalist: Sweden (Anna Hasselborg)

The 2019 World Women's Curling Championship (branded as the 2019 LGT World Women's Curling Championship for sponsorship reasons) was held from 16 to 24 March at the Silkeborg Sportscenter in Silkeborg, Denmark.

== Qualification ==
The following nations qualified to participate in the 2019 World Women's Curling Championship:

- Denmark (host country)
- Two teams from the Americas zone
  - Canada
  - United States
- Six teams from the 2018 European Curling Championships (Note: As the zone with the automatically qualifying host country and the lowest-placed team in the 2018 World Women's Curling Championship, the European zone loses two guaranteed berths.)
  - Germany
  - Latvia
  - Russia
  - Scotland
  - Sweden
  - Switzerland
- Two teams from the 2018 Pacific-Asia Curling Championships
  - Japan
  - South Korea
- Two teams from the 2019 World Qualification Event
  - China
  - Finland

== Teams ==
The teams are as follows:

| Canada | China | Denmark | Finland | Germany |
|---|---|---|---|---|
| The Glencoe Club, Calgary Skip: Chelsea Carey; Third: Sarah Wilkes; Second: Dana Ferguson; Lead: Rachelle Brown; Alternate: Jill Officer | Harbin CC, Harbin Fourth: Wang Rui; Skip: Mei Jie; Second: Yao Mingyue; Lead: Ma Jingyi; Alternate: Zhang Lijun | Hvidovre CC, Hvidovre Skip: Madeleine Dupont; Third: Denise Dupont; Second: Julie Høgh; Lead: Lina Knudsen; Alternate: Gabriella Qvist | Åland Curling, Eckerö Skip: Oona Kauste; Third: Eszter Juhász; Second: Maija Salmiovirta; Lead: Lotta Immonen; Alternate: Marjo Hippi | CC Füssen, Füssen Skip: Daniela Jentsch; Third: Emira Abbes; Second: Klara-Hermine Fomm; Lead: Analena Jentsch; Alternate: Mia Höhne |
| Japan | South Korea | Latvia | Russia | Scotland |
| Karuizawa CC, Karuizawa Fourth: Ikue Kitazawa; Third: Chiaki Matsumura; Skip: Seina Nakajima; Lead: Hasumi Ishigooka; Alternate: Emi Shimizu | Chuncheon CC, Chuncheon Skip: Kim Min-ji; Third: Kim Hye-rin; Second: Yang Tae-i; Lead: Kim Su-jin | Jelgavas KK, Jelgava Skip: Iveta Staša-Šaršūne; Third: Santa Blumberga; Second: Ieva Krusta; Lead: Evelīna Barone; Alternate: Tīna Siliņa | Adamant CC, Saint Petersburg Skip: Alina Kovaleva; Third: Anastasia Bryzgalova; Second: Galina Arsenkina; Lead: Ekaterina Kuzmina; Alternate: Uliana Vasilyeva | Dumfries Curling, Dumfries Skip: Sophie Jackson^{1} Third: Naomi Brown; Second: Mili Smith; Lead: Sophie Sinclair; Alternate: Lauren Gray^{1} |
| Sweden | Switzerland | United States | | |
| Sundbybergs CK, Sundbyberg Skip: Anna Hasselborg; Third: Sara McManus; Second: Agnes Knochenhauer; Lead: Sofia Mabergs; Alternate: Johanna Heldin | CC Aarau, Aarau Fourth: Alina Pätz; Skip: Silvana Tirinzoni; Second: Esther Neuenschwander; Lead: Melanie Barbezat; Alternate: Marisa Winkelhausen | Four Seasons CC, Blaine Skip: Jamie Sinclair; Third: Sarah Anderson; Second: Taylor Anderson; Lead: Monica Walker; Alternate: Vicky Persinger | | |

Notes

1. Team Scotland's alternate Lauren Gray threw skip stones during Draws 4, 5, 7 and 8 as their skip Sophie Jackson had a back and knee injury.

=== WCT ranking ===
Year to date World Curling Tour order of merit ranking for each team prior to the event.

| Nation (Skip) | Rank | Points |
|---|---|---|
| Sweden (Hasselborg) | 2 | 414.259 |
| Switzerland (Tirinzoni) | 4 | 382.473 |
| Canada (Carey) | 6 | 307.215 |
| Russia (Kovaleva) | 11 | 218.129 |
| South Korea (Kim) | 14 | 200.786 |
| Japan (Nakajima) | 26 | 147.937 |
| Germany (Jentsch) | 28 | 134.55 |
| China (Mei) | 34 | 123.048 |
| United States (Sinclair) | 36 | 118.046 |
| Scotland (Jackson) | 65 | 59.901 |
| Finland (Kauste) | 84 | 48.474 |
| Latvia (Staša-Šaršūne) | 134 | 18.751 |
| Denmark (Dupont) | 152 | 14.526 |

== Round-robin standings ==
Final round-robin standings

Key
| Teams to playoffs |

| Country | Skip | W | L | W–L | PF | PA | EW | EL | BE | SE | S% | DSC |
|---|---|---|---|---|---|---|---|---|---|---|---|---|
| Sweden | Anna Hasselborg | 11 | 1 | – | 92 | 60 | 50 | 41 | 7 | 11 | 85% | 22.30 |
| South Korea | Kim Min-ji | 9 | 3 | 1–0 | 89 | 74 | 52 | 49 | 5 | 15 | 78% | 57.45 |
| Russia | Alina Kovaleva | 9 | 3 | 0–1 | 91 | 74 | 55 | 44 | 6 | 13 | 83% | 35.55 |
| Switzerland | Silvana Tirinzoni | 8 | 4 | – | 84 | 71 | 49 | 46 | 8 | 15 | 81% | 38.22 |
| China | Mei Jie | 7 | 5 | – | 95 | 78 | 49 | 48 | 9 | 9 | 80% | 41.20 |
| Japan | Seina Nakajima | 6 | 6 | 2–0 | 81 | 77 | 48 | 52 | 3 | 10 | 79% | 43.87 |
| United States | Jamie Sinclair | 6 | 6 | 1–1 | 88 | 85 | 53 | 53 | 4 | 16 | 76% | 50.91 |
| Canada^ | Chelsea Carey | 6 | 6 | 0–2 | 73 | 81 | 44 | 51 | 11 | 7 | 81% | 34.95 |
| Germany | Daniela Jentsch | 5 | 7 | – | 83 | 90 | 51 | 49 | 5 | 10 | 73% | 62.05 |
| Scotland | Sophie Jackson | 4 | 8 | – | 69 | 87 | 45 | 49 | 12 | 8 | 79% | 35.64 |
| Denmark | Madeleine Dupont | 3 | 9 | 1–0 | 67 | 85 | 48 | 51 | 4 | 12 | 76% | 64.18 |
| Finland | Oona Kauste | 3 | 9 | 0–1 | 68 | 90 | 45 | 52 | 7 | 10 | 73% | 57.01 |
| Latvia | Iveta Staša-Šaršūne | 1 | 11 | – | 70 | 98 | 50 | 54 | 3 | 10 | 73% | 51.13 |

^ This was the first time the Canadian women's team failed to reach the playoffs at the World Championships in twenty years.

== Round-robin results ==
All draw times are listed in Central European Standard Time (UTC+1:00).

=== Draw 1 ===
Saturday, 16 March, 14:00

| Sheet A | 1 | 2 | 3 | 4 | 5 | 6 | 7 | 8 | 9 | 10 | Final |
|---|---|---|---|---|---|---|---|---|---|---|---|
| Sweden (Hasselborg) 🔨 | 0 | 1 | 0 | 0 | 2 | 0 | 0 | X | X | X | 3 |
| China (Mei) | 1 | 0 | 2 | 1 | 0 | 2 | 3 | X | X | X | 9 |

| Sheet B | 1 | 2 | 3 | 4 | 5 | 6 | 7 | 8 | 9 | 10 | Final |
|---|---|---|---|---|---|---|---|---|---|---|---|
| Russia (Kovaleva) 🔨 | 0 | 2 | 0 | 3 | 0 | 2 | 1 | 0 | 3 | X | 11 |
| Switzerland (Tirinzoni) | 1 | 0 | 2 | 0 | 1 | 0 | 0 | 1 | 0 | X | 5 |

| Sheet C | 1 | 2 | 3 | 4 | 5 | 6 | 7 | 8 | 9 | 10 | Final |
|---|---|---|---|---|---|---|---|---|---|---|---|
| Japan (Nakajima) 🔨 | 1 | 1 | 0 | 2 | 0 | 4 | 0 | 2 | X | X | 10 |
| Scotland (Jackson) | 0 | 0 | 1 | 0 | 2 | 0 | 1 | 0 | X | X | 4 |

| Sheet D | 1 | 2 | 3 | 4 | 5 | 6 | 7 | 8 | 9 | 10 | Final |
|---|---|---|---|---|---|---|---|---|---|---|---|
| Germany (Jentsch) | 1 | 0 | 1 | 0 | 2 | 0 | 4 | 2 | 0 | X | 10 |
| Latvia (Staša-Šaršūne) 🔨 | 0 | 0 | 0 | 1 | 0 | 3 | 0 | 0 | 1 | X | 5 |

=== Draw 2 ===
Saturday, 16 March, 19:30

| Sheet A | 1 | 2 | 3 | 4 | 5 | 6 | 7 | 8 | 9 | 10 | Final |
|---|---|---|---|---|---|---|---|---|---|---|---|
| South Korea (Kim) | 0 | 0 | 1 | 0 | 2 | 0 | 1 | 0 | 3 | 0 | 7 |
| Canada (Carey) 🔨 | 0 | 0 | 0 | 2 | 0 | 2 | 0 | 2 | 0 | 0 | 6 |

| Sheet B | 1 | 2 | 3 | 4 | 5 | 6 | 7 | 8 | 9 | 10 | Final |
|---|---|---|---|---|---|---|---|---|---|---|---|
| Sweden (Hasselborg) 🔨 | 2 | 0 | 2 | 0 | 2 | 0 | 0 | 2 | 0 | X | 8 |
| Latvia (Staša-Šaršūne) | 0 | 1 | 0 | 1 | 0 | 1 | 0 | 0 | 2 | X | 5 |

| Sheet C | 1 | 2 | 3 | 4 | 5 | 6 | 7 | 8 | 9 | 10 | 11 | Final |
|---|---|---|---|---|---|---|---|---|---|---|---|---|
| United States (Sinclair) 🔨 | 1 | 0 | 2 | 1 | 0 | 0 | 0 | 1 | 0 | 1 | 2 | 8 |
| Denmark (Dupont) | 0 | 1 | 0 | 0 | 2 | 1 | 1 | 0 | 1 | 0 | 0 | 6 |

| Sheet D | 1 | 2 | 3 | 4 | 5 | 6 | 7 | 8 | 9 | 10 | Final |
|---|---|---|---|---|---|---|---|---|---|---|---|
| Finland (Kauste) 🔨 | 1 | 0 | 1 | 0 | 2 | 1 | 1 | 0 | 0 | / | L |
| Switzerland (Tirinzoni) | 0 | 2 | 0 | 1 | 0 | 0 | 0 | 2 | 2 | | W |

^Finland ran out of time, and therefore forfeited the match.

=== Draw 3 ===
Sunday, 17 March, 09:00

| Sheet A | 1 | 2 | 3 | 4 | 5 | 6 | 7 | 8 | 9 | 10 | Final |
|---|---|---|---|---|---|---|---|---|---|---|---|
| Denmark (Dupont) | 0 | 0 | 3 | 0 | 1 | 0 | 0 | 0 | 2 | 0 | 6 |
| Russia (Kovaleva) 🔨 | 0 | 2 | 0 | 1 | 0 | 1 | 0 | 2 | 0 | 1 | 7 |

| Sheet B | 1 | 2 | 3 | 4 | 5 | 6 | 7 | 8 | 9 | 10 | Final |
|---|---|---|---|---|---|---|---|---|---|---|---|
| Canada (Carey) 🔨 | 0 | 1 | 0 | 0 | 4 | 2 | 0 | 1 | 0 | X | 8 |
| Germany (Jentsch) | 0 | 0 | 1 | 1 | 0 | 0 | 2 | 0 | 1 | X | 5 |

| Sheet C | 1 | 2 | 3 | 4 | 5 | 6 | 7 | 8 | 9 | 10 | Final |
|---|---|---|---|---|---|---|---|---|---|---|---|
| China (Mei) 🔨 | 2 | 1 | 0 | 3 | 0 | 4 | X | X | X | X | 10 |
| Finland (Kauste) | 0 | 0 | 1 | 0 | 1 | 0 | X | X | X | X | 2 |

| Sheet D | 1 | 2 | 3 | 4 | 5 | 6 | 7 | 8 | 9 | 10 | Final |
|---|---|---|---|---|---|---|---|---|---|---|---|
| United States (Sinclair) | 0 | 0 | 1 | 1 | 0 | 2 | 0 | 1 | 0 | X | 5 |
| Japan (Nakajima) 🔨 | 2 | 1 | 0 | 0 | 3 | 0 | 1 | 0 | 2 | X | 9 |

=== Draw 4 ===
Sunday, 17 March, 14:00

| Sheet A | 1 | 2 | 3 | 4 | 5 | 6 | 7 | 8 | 9 | 10 | Final |
|---|---|---|---|---|---|---|---|---|---|---|---|
| Germany (Jentsch) | 0 | 3 | 0 | 3 | 0 | 0 | 1 | 0 | 1 | 2 | 10 |
| Japan (Nakajima) 🔨 | 1 | 0 | 1 | 0 | 3 | 1 | 0 | 1 | 0 | 0 | 7 |

| Sheet B | 1 | 2 | 3 | 4 | 5 | 6 | 7 | 8 | 9 | 10 | Final |
|---|---|---|---|---|---|---|---|---|---|---|---|
| Scotland (Gray) 🔨 | 0 | 0 | 3 | 2 | 0 | 0 | 0 | 0 | 2 | X | 7 |
| China (Mei) | 2 | 4 | 0 | 0 | 0 | 2 | 0 | 2 | 0 | X | 10 |

| Sheet C | 1 | 2 | 3 | 4 | 5 | 6 | 7 | 8 | 9 | 10 | Final |
|---|---|---|---|---|---|---|---|---|---|---|---|
| Switzerland (Tirinzoni) | 0 | 0 | 0 | 2 | 0 | 1 | 1 | 0 | 1 | 0 | 5 |
| Sweden (Hasselborg) 🔨 | 1 | 0 | 1 | 0 | 3 | 0 | 0 | 2 | 0 | 1 | 8 |

| Sheet D | 1 | 2 | 3 | 4 | 5 | 6 | 7 | 8 | 9 | 10 | Final |
|---|---|---|---|---|---|---|---|---|---|---|---|
| Russia (Kovaleva) 🔨 | 0 | 1 | 0 | 1 | 0 | 2 | 0 | 1 | 1 | 0 | 6 |
| South Korea (Kim) | 1 | 0 | 1 | 0 | 0 | 0 | 3 | 0 | 0 | 2 | 7 |

=== Draw 5 ===
Sunday, 17 March, 19:00

| Sheet A | 1 | 2 | 3 | 4 | 5 | 6 | 7 | 8 | 9 | 10 | Final |
|---|---|---|---|---|---|---|---|---|---|---|---|
| Finland (Kauste) | 0 | 1 | 0 | 0 | 1 | 0 | 1 | 0 | 0 | X | 3 |
| Scotland (Gray) 🔨 | 1 | 0 | 0 | 1 | 0 | 2 | 0 | 3 | 2 | X | 9 |

| Sheet B | 1 | 2 | 3 | 4 | 5 | 6 | 7 | 8 | 9 | 10 | Final |
|---|---|---|---|---|---|---|---|---|---|---|---|
| South Korea (Kim) 🔨 | 0 | 0 | 2 | 0 | 0 | 2 | 0 | 2 | 1 | 2 | 9 |
| United States (Sinclair) | 0 | 1 | 0 | 1 | 1 | 0 | 2 | 0 | 0 | 0 | 5 |

| Sheet C | 1 | 2 | 3 | 4 | 5 | 6 | 7 | 8 | 9 | 10 | Final |
|---|---|---|---|---|---|---|---|---|---|---|---|
| Latvia (Staša-Šaršūne) | 0 | 2 | 0 | 1 | 0 | 2 | 0 | 1 | 0 | 1 | 7 |
| Canada (Carey) 🔨 | 1 | 0 | 2 | 0 | 1 | 0 | 2 | 0 | 2 | 0 | 8 |

| Sheet D | 1 | 2 | 3 | 4 | 5 | 6 | 7 | 8 | 9 | 10 | Final |
|---|---|---|---|---|---|---|---|---|---|---|---|
| Denmark (Dupont) | 0 | 1 | 0 | 0 | 1 | 0 | 1 | X | X | X | 3 |
| Sweden (Hasselborg) 🔨 | 2 | 0 | 1 | 1 | 0 | 3 | 0 | X | X | X | 7 |

=== Draw 6 ===
Monday, 18 March, 09:00

| Sheet A | 1 | 2 | 3 | 4 | 5 | 6 | 7 | 8 | 9 | 10 | Final |
|---|---|---|---|---|---|---|---|---|---|---|---|
| China (Mei) | 0 | 0 | 2 | 0 | 0 | 3 | 0 | 0 | 0 | 1 | 6 |
| Latvia (Staša-Šaršūne) 🔨 | 0 | 2 | 0 | 1 | 0 | 0 | 1 | 1 | 0 | 0 | 5 |

| Sheet B | 1 | 2 | 3 | 4 | 5 | 6 | 7 | 8 | 9 | 10 | Final |
|---|---|---|---|---|---|---|---|---|---|---|---|
| Japan (Nakajima) | 0 | 1 | 1 | 0 | 0 | 0 | 2 | 0 | 0 | X | 4 |
| Russia (Kovaleva) 🔨 | 2 | 0 | 0 | 2 | 1 | 0 | 0 | 2 | 1 | X | 8 |

| Sheet C | 1 | 2 | 3 | 4 | 5 | 6 | 7 | 8 | 9 | 10 | Final |
|---|---|---|---|---|---|---|---|---|---|---|---|
| Finland (Kauste) 🔨 | 1 | 1 | 0 | 0 | 0 | 1 | 0 | 0 | 0 | X | 3 |
| United States (Sinclair) | 0 | 0 | 2 | 1 | 0 | 0 | 0 | 1 | 2 | X | 6 |

=== Draw 7 ===
Monday, 18 March, 14:00

| Sheet A | 1 | 2 | 3 | 4 | 5 | 6 | 7 | 8 | 9 | 10 | Final |
|---|---|---|---|---|---|---|---|---|---|---|---|
| Japan (Nakajima) 🔨 | 0 | 0 | 2 | 1 | 1 | 0 | 1 | 0 | 2 | 0 | 7 |
| Canada (Carey) | 0 | 2 | 0 | 0 | 0 | 1 | 0 | 1 | 0 | 1 | 5 |

| Sheet B | 1 | 2 | 3 | 4 | 5 | 6 | 7 | 8 | 9 | 10 | Final |
|---|---|---|---|---|---|---|---|---|---|---|---|
| Switzerland (Tirinzoni) | 0 | 0 | 4 | 1 | 0 | 0 | 4 | X | X | X | 9 |
| Denmark (Dupont) 🔨 | 1 | 1 | 0 | 0 | 0 | 1 | 0 | X | X | X | 3 |

| Sheet C | 1 | 2 | 3 | 4 | 5 | 6 | 7 | 8 | 9 | 10 | Final |
|---|---|---|---|---|---|---|---|---|---|---|---|
| Sweden (Hasselborg) 🔨 | 0 | 2 | 0 | 2 | 0 | 2 | 0 | 1 | 1 | X | 8 |
| South Korea (Kim) | 0 | 0 | 1 | 0 | 1 | 0 | 2 | 0 | 0 | X | 4 |

| Sheet D | 1 | 2 | 3 | 4 | 5 | 6 | 7 | 8 | 9 | 10 | Final |
|---|---|---|---|---|---|---|---|---|---|---|---|
| Scotland (Gray) 🔨 | 3 | 0 | 1 | 0 | 0 | 2 | 0 | 1 | 0 | 2 | 9 |
| Germany (Jentsch) | 0 | 1 | 0 | 1 | 1 | 0 | 4 | 0 | 1 | 0 | 8 |

=== Draw 8 ===
Monday, 18 March, 19:00

| Sheet A | 1 | 2 | 3 | 4 | 5 | 6 | 7 | 8 | 9 | 10 | Final |
|---|---|---|---|---|---|---|---|---|---|---|---|
| United States (Sinclair) 🔨 | 1 | 2 | 0 | 0 | 0 | 2 | 0 | 0 | 2 | 0 | 7 |
| Russia (Kovaleva) | 0 | 0 | 2 | 1 | 2 | 0 | 0 | 2 | 0 | 1 | 8 |

| Sheet B | 1 | 2 | 3 | 4 | 5 | 6 | 7 | 8 | 9 | 10 | Final |
|---|---|---|---|---|---|---|---|---|---|---|---|
| Latvia (Staša-Šaršūne) | 0 | 1 | 0 | 0 | 0 | 1 | 1 | 0 | 1 | 0 | 4 |
| Scotland (Gray) 🔨 | 2 | 0 | 0 | 0 | 0 | 0 | 0 | 1 | 0 | 2 | 5 |

| Sheet C | 1 | 2 | 3 | 4 | 5 | 6 | 7 | 8 | 9 | 10 | Final |
|---|---|---|---|---|---|---|---|---|---|---|---|
| Denmark (Dupont) | 0 | 0 | 1 | 0 | 0 | 2 | 0 | 1 | 0 | X | 4 |
| China (Mei) 🔨 | 0 | 2 | 0 | 3 | 1 | 0 | 1 | 0 | 1 | X | 8 |

| Sheet D | 1 | 2 | 3 | 4 | 5 | 6 | 7 | 8 | 9 | 10 | Final |
|---|---|---|---|---|---|---|---|---|---|---|---|
| Canada (Carey) 🔨 | 1 | 1 | 0 | 2 | 0 | 1 | 0 | 2 | 0 | 0 | 7 |
| Finland (Kauste) | 0 | 0 | 1 | 0 | 1 | 0 | 1 | 0 | 2 | 1 | 6 |

=== Draw 9 ===
Tuesday, 19 March, 09:00

| Sheet B | 1 | 2 | 3 | 4 | 5 | 6 | 7 | 8 | 9 | 10 | Final |
|---|---|---|---|---|---|---|---|---|---|---|---|
| Russia (Kovaleva) 🔨 | 0 | 3 | 0 | 2 | 0 | 2 | 0 | 1 | 0 | 1 | 9 |
| China (Mei) | 0 | 0 | 2 | 0 | 1 | 0 | 2 | 0 | 2 | 0 | 7 |

| Sheet C | 1 | 2 | 3 | 4 | 5 | 6 | 7 | 8 | 9 | 10 | Final |
|---|---|---|---|---|---|---|---|---|---|---|---|
| Germany (Jentsch) 🔨 | 1 | 3 | 0 | 3 | 0 | 1 | 0 | 2 | X | X | 10 |
| United States (Sinclair) | 0 | 0 | 1 | 0 | 3 | 0 | 1 | 0 | X | X | 5 |

| Sheet D | 1 | 2 | 3 | 4 | 5 | 6 | 7 | 8 | 9 | 10 | Final |
|---|---|---|---|---|---|---|---|---|---|---|---|
| South Korea (Kim) | 0 | 1 | 0 | 1 | 0 | 2 | 0 | 2 | 0 | 0 | 6 |
| Switzerland (Tirinzoni) 🔨 | 0 | 0 | 0 | 0 | 1 | 0 | 2 | 0 | 1 | 1 | 5 |

=== Draw 10 ===
Tuesday, 19 March, 14:00

| Sheet A | 1 | 2 | 3 | 4 | 5 | 6 | 7 | 8 | 9 | 10 | 11 | Final |
|---|---|---|---|---|---|---|---|---|---|---|---|---|
| Canada (Carey) | 0 | 0 | 1 | 2 | 0 | 0 | 1 | 0 | 0 | 1 | 0 | 5 |
| Scotland (Jackson) 🔨 | 1 | 0 | 0 | 0 | 0 | 1 | 0 | 2 | 1 | 0 | 1 | 6 |

| Sheet B | 1 | 2 | 3 | 4 | 5 | 6 | 7 | 8 | 9 | 10 | Final |
|---|---|---|---|---|---|---|---|---|---|---|---|
| Finland (Kauste) 🔨 | 0 | 0 | 0 | 0 | 2 | 0 | 0 | X | X | X | 2 |
| Sweden (Hasselborg) | 1 | 2 | 0 | 4 | 0 | 1 | 2 | X | X | X | 10 |

| Sheet C | 1 | 2 | 3 | 4 | 5 | 6 | 7 | 8 | 9 | 10 | Final |
|---|---|---|---|---|---|---|---|---|---|---|---|
| South Korea (Kim) | 0 | 2 | 2 | 0 | 3 | 2 | 0 | 2 | X | X | 11 |
| Japan (Nakajima) 🔨 | 2 | 0 | 0 | 1 | 0 | 0 | 1 | 0 | X | X | 4 |

| Sheet D | 1 | 2 | 3 | 4 | 5 | 6 | 7 | 8 | 9 | 10 | 11 | Final |
|---|---|---|---|---|---|---|---|---|---|---|---|---|
| Latvia (Staša-Šaršūne) | 1 | 0 | 2 | 1 | 2 | 0 | 1 | 0 | 1 | 0 | 3 | 11 |
| Denmark (Dupont) 🔨 | 0 | 2 | 0 | 0 | 0 | 3 | 0 | 2 | 0 | 1 | 0 | 8 |

=== Draw 11 ===
Tuesday, 19 March, 19:00

| Sheet A | 1 | 2 | 3 | 4 | 5 | 6 | 7 | 8 | 9 | 10 | Final |
|---|---|---|---|---|---|---|---|---|---|---|---|
| Switzerland (Tirinzoni) 🔨 | 1 | 0 | 0 | 0 | 1 | 1 | 1 | 0 | 0 | 4 | 8 |
| Latvia (Staša-Šaršūne) | 0 | 1 | 1 | 1 | 0 | 0 | 0 | 0 | 2 | 0 | 5 |

| Sheet B | 1 | 2 | 3 | 4 | 5 | 6 | 7 | 8 | 9 | 10 | Final |
|---|---|---|---|---|---|---|---|---|---|---|---|
| United States (Sinclair) 🔨 | 0 | 1 | 0 | 2 | 0 | 5 | 1 | 4 | X | X | 13 |
| Canada (Carey) | 3 | 0 | 1 | 0 | 2 | 0 | 0 | 0 | X | X | 6 |

| Sheet C | 1 | 2 | 3 | 4 | 5 | 6 | 7 | 8 | 9 | 10 | 11 | Final |
|---|---|---|---|---|---|---|---|---|---|---|---|---|
| Russia (Kovaleva) 🔨 | 2 | 0 | 0 | 3 | 0 | 1 | 0 | 2 | 0 | 0 | 1 | 9 |
| Finland (Kauste) | 0 | 0 | 2 | 0 | 1 | 0 | 3 | 0 | 0 | 2 | 0 | 8 |

| Sheet D | 1 | 2 | 3 | 4 | 5 | 6 | 7 | 8 | 9 | 10 | Final |
|---|---|---|---|---|---|---|---|---|---|---|---|
| China (Mei) 🔨 | 2 | 0 | 2 | 0 | 0 | 0 | 1 | 1 | 0 | 2 | 8 |
| Germany (Jentsch) | 0 | 3 | 0 | 1 | 0 | 1 | 0 | 0 | 1 | 0 | 6 |

=== Draw 12 ===
Wednesday, 20 March, 09:00

| Sheet A | 1 | 2 | 3 | 4 | 5 | 6 | 7 | 8 | 9 | 10 | Final |
|---|---|---|---|---|---|---|---|---|---|---|---|
| Denmark (Dupont) | 2 | 1 | 1 | 0 | 1 | 1 | 1 | X | X | X | 7 |
| Japan (Nakajima) 🔨 | 0 | 0 | 0 | 1 | 0 | 0 | 0 | X | X | X | 1 |

| Sheet B | 1 | 2 | 3 | 4 | 5 | 6 | 7 | 8 | 9 | 10 | Final |
|---|---|---|---|---|---|---|---|---|---|---|---|
| Germany (Jentsch) | 0 | 1 | 0 | 2 | 1 | 0 | 0 | 1 | 0 | X | 5 |
| South Korea (Kim) 🔨 | 2 | 0 | 2 | 0 | 0 | 0 | 2 | 0 | 3 | X | 9 |

| Sheet C | 1 | 2 | 3 | 4 | 5 | 6 | 7 | 8 | 9 | 10 | Final |
|---|---|---|---|---|---|---|---|---|---|---|---|
| Scotland (Jackson) | 0 | 0 | 0 | 0 | 0 | 1 | X | X | X | X | 1 |
| Switzerland (Tirinzoni) 🔨 | 0 | 2 | 1 | 0 | 4 | 0 | X | X | X | X | 7 |

| Sheet D | 1 | 2 | 3 | 4 | 5 | 6 | 7 | 8 | 9 | 10 | Final |
|---|---|---|---|---|---|---|---|---|---|---|---|
| Sweden (Hasselborg) 🔨 | 0 | 3 | 0 | 0 | 2 | 1 | 0 | 0 | 3 | X | 9 |
| Russia (Kovaleva) | 0 | 0 | 0 | 2 | 0 | 0 | 1 | 1 | 0 | X | 4 |

=== Draw 13 ===
Wednesday, 20 March, 14:00

| Sheet A | 1 | 2 | 3 | 4 | 5 | 6 | 7 | 8 | 9 | 10 | Final |
|---|---|---|---|---|---|---|---|---|---|---|---|
| Finland (Kauste) | 0 | 0 | 3 | 0 | 1 | 0 | 1 | 2 | 1 | X | 8 |
| South Korea (Kim) 🔨 | 2 | 0 | 0 | 1 | 0 | 0 | 0 | 0 | 0 | X | 3 |

| Sheet B | 1 | 2 | 3 | 4 | 5 | 6 | 7 | 8 | 9 | 10 | Final |
|---|---|---|---|---|---|---|---|---|---|---|---|
| Denmark (Dupont) 🔨 | 0 | 3 | 0 | 1 | 0 | 2 | 0 | 2 | 0 | 1 | 9 |
| Scotland (Jackson) | 0 | 0 | 3 | 0 | 0 | 0 | 2 | 0 | 1 | 0 | 6 |

| Sheet C | 1 | 2 | 3 | 4 | 5 | 6 | 7 | 8 | 9 | 10 | Final |
|---|---|---|---|---|---|---|---|---|---|---|---|
| Canada (Carey) 🔨 | 1 | 0 | 2 | 0 | 1 | 0 | 1 | 0 | 3 | 0 | 8 |
| China (Mei) | 0 | 1 | 0 | 2 | 0 | 1 | 0 | 2 | 0 | 1 | 7 |

| Sheet D | 1 | 2 | 3 | 4 | 5 | 6 | 7 | 8 | 9 | 10 | Final |
|---|---|---|---|---|---|---|---|---|---|---|---|
| Latvia (Staša-Šaršūne) | 0 | 0 | 1 | 2 | 0 | 2 | 0 | 0 | 1 | 0 | 6 |
| United States (Sinclair) 🔨 | 0 | 3 | 0 | 0 | 1 | 0 | 2 | 1 | 0 | 2 | 9 |

=== Draw 14 ===
Wednesday, 20 March, 19:00

| Sheet A | 1 | 2 | 3 | 4 | 5 | 6 | 7 | 8 | 9 | 10 | Final |
|---|---|---|---|---|---|---|---|---|---|---|---|
| Russia (Kovaleva) 🔨 | 2 | 0 | 0 | 2 | 0 | 1 | 1 | 1 | 0 | X | 7 |
| Germany (Jentsch) | 0 | 0 | 1 | 0 | 2 | 0 | 0 | 0 | 1 | X | 4 |

| Sheet B | 1 | 2 | 3 | 4 | 5 | 6 | 7 | 8 | 9 | 10 | 11 | Final |
|---|---|---|---|---|---|---|---|---|---|---|---|---|
| China (Mei) 🔨 | 0 | 0 | 0 | 3 | 0 | 2 | 0 | 3 | 0 | 0 | 0 | 8 |
| Switzerland (Tirinzoni) | 0 | 0 | 0 | 0 | 2 | 0 | 2 | 0 | 3 | 1 | 1 | 9 |

| Sheet C | 1 | 2 | 3 | 4 | 5 | 6 | 7 | 8 | 9 | 10 | Final |
|---|---|---|---|---|---|---|---|---|---|---|---|
| United States (Sinclair) | 0 | 1 | 0 | 1 | 0 | 2 | 1 | 0 | 2 | 0 | 7 |
| Sweden (Hasselborg) 🔨 | 2 | 0 | 1 | 0 | 2 | 0 | 0 | 1 | 0 | 3 | 9 |

| Sheet D | 1 | 2 | 3 | 4 | 5 | 6 | 7 | 8 | 9 | 10 | Final |
|---|---|---|---|---|---|---|---|---|---|---|---|
| Japan (Nakajima) | 0 | 2 | 0 | 3 | 0 | 1 | 1 | 0 | 3 | X | 10 |
| Finland (Kauste) 🔨 | 1 | 0 | 2 | 0 | 0 | 0 | 0 | 1 | 0 | X | 4 |

=== Draw 15 ===
Thursday, 21 March, 09:00

| Sheet A | 1 | 2 | 3 | 4 | 5 | 6 | 7 | 8 | 9 | 10 | Final |
|---|---|---|---|---|---|---|---|---|---|---|---|
| Scotland (Jackson) 🔨 | 1 | 0 | 2 | 1 | 0 | 1 | 0 | 2 | 0 | 0 | 7 |
| Sweden (Hasselborg) | 0 | 1 | 0 | 0 | 3 | 0 | 2 | 0 | 0 | 2 | 8 |

| Sheet B | 1 | 2 | 3 | 4 | 5 | 6 | 7 | 8 | 9 | 10 | Final |
|---|---|---|---|---|---|---|---|---|---|---|---|
| Latvia (Staša-Šaršūne) | 0 | 1 | 0 | 1 | 1 | 0 | X | X | X | X | 3 |
| Japan (Nakajima) 🔨 | 3 | 0 | 4 | 0 | 0 | 2 | X | X | X | X | 9 |

| Sheet C | 1 | 2 | 3 | 4 | 5 | 6 | 7 | 8 | 9 | 10 | Final |
|---|---|---|---|---|---|---|---|---|---|---|---|
| South Korea (Kim) 🔨 | 2 | 1 | 0 | 0 | 1 | 0 | 3 | 0 | 2 | X | 9 |
| Denmark (Dupont) | 0 | 0 | 1 | 1 | 0 | 2 | 0 | 1 | 0 | X | 5 |

| Sheet D | 1 | 2 | 3 | 4 | 5 | 6 | 7 | 8 | 9 | 10 | Final |
|---|---|---|---|---|---|---|---|---|---|---|---|
| Switzerland (Tirinzoni) 🔨 | 2 | 0 | 0 | 1 | 0 | 2 | 0 | 4 | X | X | 9 |
| Canada (Carey) | 0 | 2 | 0 | 0 | 0 | 0 | 1 | 0 | X | X | 3 |

=== Draw 16 ===
Thursday, 21 March, 14:00

| Sheet A | 1 | 2 | 3 | 4 | 5 | 6 | 7 | 8 | 9 | 10 | Final |
|---|---|---|---|---|---|---|---|---|---|---|---|
| China (Mei) | 0 | 0 | 4 | 0 | 0 | 0 | 1 | 0 | 2 | 0 | 7 |
| United States (Sinclair) 🔨 | 2 | 2 | 0 | 0 | 2 | 2 | 0 | 1 | 0 | 1 | 10 |

| Sheet B | 1 | 2 | 3 | 4 | 5 | 6 | 7 | 8 | 9 | 10 | Final |
|---|---|---|---|---|---|---|---|---|---|---|---|
| Canada (Carey) | 0 | 2 | 0 | 3 | 0 | 0 | 1 | 0 | 3 | X | 9 |
| Russia (Kovaleva) 🔨 | 3 | 0 | 2 | 0 | 0 | 0 | 0 | 1 | 0 | X | 6 |

| Sheet C | 1 | 2 | 3 | 4 | 5 | 6 | 7 | 8 | 9 | 10 | Final |
|---|---|---|---|---|---|---|---|---|---|---|---|
| Finland (Kauste) | 0 | 1 | 0 | 2 | 1 | 0 | 2 | 1 | 0 | 3 | 10 |
| Latvia (Staša-Šaršūne) 🔨 | 2 | 0 | 2 | 0 | 0 | 2 | 0 | 0 | 2 | 0 | 8 |

| Sheet D | 1 | 2 | 3 | 4 | 5 | 6 | 7 | 8 | 9 | 10 | Final |
|---|---|---|---|---|---|---|---|---|---|---|---|
| Germany (Jentsch) 🔨 | 2 | 0 | 0 | 2 | 0 | 2 | 0 | 1 | 0 | 1 | 8 |
| Denmark (Dupont) | 0 | 0 | 1 | 0 | 2 | 0 | 2 | 0 | 1 | 0 | 6 |

=== Draw 17 ===
Thursday, 21 March, 19:00

| Sheet A | 1 | 2 | 3 | 4 | 5 | 6 | 7 | 8 | 9 | 10 | Final |
|---|---|---|---|---|---|---|---|---|---|---|---|
| Japan (Nakajima) 🔨 | 1 | 0 | 1 | 1 | 0 | 0 | 2 | 0 | 1 | 0 | 6 |
| Switzerland (Tirinzoni) | 0 | 3 | 0 | 0 | 1 | 1 | 0 | 1 | 0 | 1 | 7 |

| Sheet B | 1 | 2 | 3 | 4 | 5 | 6 | 7 | 8 | 9 | 10 | Final |
|---|---|---|---|---|---|---|---|---|---|---|---|
| Sweden (Hasselborg) | 0 | 0 | 0 | 0 | 2 | 1 | 0 | 5 | X | X | 8 |
| Germany (Jentsch) 🔨 | 0 | 0 | 0 | 2 | 0 | 0 | 1 | 0 | X | X | 3 |

| Sheet C | 1 | 2 | 3 | 4 | 5 | 6 | 7 | 8 | 9 | 10 | Final |
|---|---|---|---|---|---|---|---|---|---|---|---|
| Scotland (Jackson) 🔨 | 2 | 0 | 0 | 0 | 0 | 1 | 0 | 1 | 0 | X | 4 |
| Russia (Kovaleva) | 0 | 1 | 0 | 0 | 1 | 0 | 2 | 0 | 3 | X | 7 |

| Sheet D | 1 | 2 | 3 | 4 | 5 | 6 | 7 | 8 | 9 | 10 | Final |
|---|---|---|---|---|---|---|---|---|---|---|---|
| South Korea (Kim) | 0 | 1 | 1 | 0 | 5 | 0 | 1 | 0 | 1 | 0 | 9 |
| China (Mei) 🔨 | 3 | 0 | 0 | 1 | 0 | 4 | 0 | 2 | 0 | 1 | 11 |

=== Draw 18 ===
Friday, 22 March, 09:00

| Sheet A | 1 | 2 | 3 | 4 | 5 | 6 | 7 | 8 | 9 | 10 | Final |
|---|---|---|---|---|---|---|---|---|---|---|---|
| Latvia (Staša-Šaršūne) 🔨 | 1 | 0 | 0 | 1 | 0 | 0 | 2 | 0 | 3 | 0 | 7 |
| South Korea (Kim) | 0 | 1 | 1 | 0 | 1 | 1 | 0 | 2 | 0 | 2 | 8 |

| Sheet B | 1 | 2 | 3 | 4 | 5 | 6 | 7 | 8 | 9 | 10 | Final |
|---|---|---|---|---|---|---|---|---|---|---|---|
| Denmark (Dupont) 🔨 | 0 | 2 | 0 | 1 | 0 | 0 | 1 | 1 | 0 | 2 | 7 |
| Finland (Kauste) | 1 | 0 | 2 | 0 | 0 | 2 | 0 | 0 | 1 | 0 | 6 |

| Sheet C | 1 | 2 | 3 | 4 | 5 | 6 | 7 | 8 | 9 | 10 | Final |
|---|---|---|---|---|---|---|---|---|---|---|---|
| Sweden (Hasselborg) 🔨 | 0 | 0 | 0 | 1 | 0 | 0 | 2 | 0 | 2 | X | 5 |
| Canada (Carey) | 0 | 0 | 0 | 0 | 0 | 2 | 0 | 1 | 0 | X | 3 |

| Sheet D | 1 | 2 | 3 | 4 | 5 | 6 | 7 | 8 | 9 | 10 | Final |
|---|---|---|---|---|---|---|---|---|---|---|---|
| United States (Sinclair) | 1 | 0 | 0 | 2 | 0 | 0 | 6^ | 0 | 0 | 0 | 9 |
| Scotland (Jackson) 🔨 | 0 | 1 | 1 | 0 | 1 | 1 | 0 | 2 | 1 | 0 | 7 |

^Highest-scoring end of the event.

=== Draw 19 ===
Friday, 22 March, 14:00

| Sheet A | 1 | 2 | 3 | 4 | 5 | 6 | 7 | 8 | 9 | 10 | Final |
|---|---|---|---|---|---|---|---|---|---|---|---|
| Germany (Jentsch) | 0 | 1 | 0 | 1 | 0 | 1 | 0 | 1 | X | X | 4 |
| Finland (Kauste)🔨 | 3 | 0 | 3 | 0 | 3 | 0 | 1 | 0 | X | X | 10 |

| Sheet B | 1 | 2 | 3 | 4 | 5 | 6 | 7 | 8 | 9 | 10 | Final |
|---|---|---|---|---|---|---|---|---|---|---|---|
| Switzerland (Tirinzoni) 🔨 | 0 | 2 | 0 | 1 | 0 | 0 | 1 | 1 | 0 | 0 | 5 |
| United States (Anderson) | 0 | 0 | 1 | 0 | 1 | 0 | 0 | 0 | 1 | 1 | 4 |

| Sheet C | 1 | 2 | 3 | 4 | 5 | 6 | 7 | 8 | 9 | 10 | Final |
|---|---|---|---|---|---|---|---|---|---|---|---|
| China (Mei) | 0 | 0 | 0 | 1 | 0 | 1 | 0 | 0 | 2 | X | 4 |
| Japan (Nakajima) 🔨 | 0 | 1 | 0 | 0 | 2 | 0 | 1 | 2 | 0 | X | 6 |

| Sheet D | 1 | 2 | 3 | 4 | 5 | 6 | 7 | 8 | 9 | 10 | Final |
|---|---|---|---|---|---|---|---|---|---|---|---|
| Russia (Kovaleva) | 0 | 1 | 0 | 3 | 0 | 2 | 0 | 1 | 2 | X | 9 |
| Latvia (Staša-Šaršūne) 🔨 | 1 | 0 | 1 | 0 | 1 | 0 | 1 | 0 | 0 | X | 4 |

^U.S. skip Jamie Sinclair was unable to play in this draw due to an injury sustained when she fell at the conclusion of her team's game earlier that day. Vice-skip Sarah Anderson moved-up to skip and alternate Vicky Persinger played vice. Anderson's twin sister Taylor played her usual position of second as did lead Monica Walker.

=== Draw 20 ===
Friday, 22 March, 19:00

| Sheet A | 1 | 2 | 3 | 4 | 5 | 6 | 7 | 8 | 9 | 10 | Final |
|---|---|---|---|---|---|---|---|---|---|---|---|
| Canada (Carey) 🔨 | 0 | 1 | 1 | 0 | 0 | 3 | 0 | 0 | 0 | X | 5 |
| Denmark (Dupont) | 0 | 0 | 0 | 1 | 0 | 0 | 1 | 0 | 1 | X | 3 |

| Sheet B | 1 | 2 | 3 | 4 | 5 | 6 | 7 | 8 | 9 | 10 | Final |
|---|---|---|---|---|---|---|---|---|---|---|---|
| Scotland (Jackson) 🔨 | 0 | 0 | 0 | 2 | 1 | 0 | 1 | 0 | 0 | 0 | 4 |
| South Korea (Kim) | 0 | 1 | 0 | 0 | 0 | 2 | 0 | 2 | 1 | 1 | 7 |

| Sheet C | 1 | 2 | 3 | 4 | 5 | 6 | 7 | 8 | 9 | 10 | Final |
|---|---|---|---|---|---|---|---|---|---|---|---|
| Switzerland (Tirinzoni) | 0 | 3 | 0 | 3 | 1 | 0 | 0 | 0 | 1 | 0 | 8 |
| Germany (Jentsch) 🔨 | 3 | 0 | 1 | 0 | 0 | 0 | 1 | 1 | 0 | 4 | 10 |

| Sheet D | 1 | 2 | 3 | 4 | 5 | 6 | 7 | 8 | 9 | 10 | Final |
|---|---|---|---|---|---|---|---|---|---|---|---|
| Japan (Nakajima) | 0 | 2 | 0 | 3 | 0 | 2 | 0 | 0 | 0 | 1 | 8 |
| Sweden (Hasselborg) 🔨 | 2 | 0 | 1 | 0 | 3 | 0 | 1 | 1 | 1 | 0 | 9 |

== Playoffs ==
Qualification games
3 | Russia | 3
6 | Japan | 11
4 | Switzerland | 7
5 | China | 6

Semifinals
1 | Sweden | 6
6 | Japan | 3
2 | South Korea | 3
4 | Switzerland | 5

Final
1 | Sweden | 7
4 | Switzerland | 8
Bronze medal game
6 | Japan | 5
2 | South Korea | 7

=== Qualification games ===
Saturday, 23 March, 9:00

| Sheet B | 1 | 2 | 3 | 4 | 5 | 6 | 7 | 8 | 9 | 10 | Final |
|---|---|---|---|---|---|---|---|---|---|---|---|
| Switzerland (Tirinzoni) 🔨 | 2 | 1 | 0 | 0 | 1 | 0 | 1 | 0 | 0 | 2 | 7 |
| China (Mei) | 0 | 0 | 2 | 1 | 0 | 1 | 0 | 2 | 0 | 0 | 6 |

Player percentages
| Switzerland | | China | |
|---|---|---|---|
| Melanie Barbezat | 74% | Ma Jingyi | 93% |
| Esther Neuenschwander | 88% | Yao Mingyue | 69% |
| Silvana Tirinzoni | 79% | Mei Jie | 83% |
| Alina Pätz | 83% | Wang Rui | 75% |
| Total | 81% | Total | 80% |

| Sheet D | 1 | 2 | 3 | 4 | 5 | 6 | 7 | 8 | 9 | 10 | Final |
|---|---|---|---|---|---|---|---|---|---|---|---|
| Russia (Kovaleva) 🔨 | 0 | 2 | 0 | 0 | 1 | 0 | 0 | 0 | X | X | 3 |
| Japan (Nakajima) | 0 | 0 | 2 | 4 | 0 | 2 | 1 | 2 | X | X | 11 |

Player percentages
| Russia | | Japan | |
|---|---|---|---|
| Ekaterina Kuzmina | 81% | Hasumi Ishigooka | 78% |
| Galina Arsenkina | 88% | Seina Nakajima | 72% |
| Anastasia Bryzgalova | 81% | Chiaki Matsumura | 95% |
| Alina Kovaleva | 59% | Ikue Kitazawa | 92% |
| Total | 77% | Total | 84% |

=== Semifinal 1 ===
Saturday, 23 March, 14:00

| Sheet C | 1 | 2 | 3 | 4 | 5 | 6 | 7 | 8 | 9 | 10 | 11 | Final |
|---|---|---|---|---|---|---|---|---|---|---|---|---|
| South Korea (Kim) 🔨 | 0 | 1 | 0 | 0 | 0 | 1 | 0 | 0 | 0 | 1 | 0 | 3 |
| Switzerland (Tirinzoni) | 1 | 0 | 0 | 1 | 0 | 0 | 0 | 1 | 0 | 0 | 2 | 5 |

Player percentages
| South Korea | | Switzerland | |
|---|---|---|---|
| Kim Su-jin | 92% | Melanie Barbezat | 93% |
| Yang Tae-i | 78% | Esther Neuenschwander | 76% |
| Kim Hye-rin | 74% | Silvana Tirinzoni | 83% |
| Kim Min-ji | 67% | Alina Pätz | 85% |
| Total | 78% | Total | 84% |

=== Semifinal 2 ===
Saturday, 23 March, 19:00

| Sheet C | 1 | 2 | 3 | 4 | 5 | 6 | 7 | 8 | 9 | 10 | Final |
|---|---|---|---|---|---|---|---|---|---|---|---|
| Sweden (Hasselborg) 🔨 | 0 | 1 | 0 | 2 | 0 | 0 | 2 | 0 | 1 | X | 6 |
| Japan (Nakajima) | 0 | 0 | 1 | 0 | 1 | 0 | 0 | 1 | 0 | X | 3 |

Player percentages
| Sweden | | Japan | |
|---|---|---|---|
| Sofia Mabergs | 83% | Hasumi Ishigooka | 93% |
| Agnes Knochenhauer | 95% | Seina Nakajima | 74% |
| Sara McManus | 89% | Chiaki Matsumura | 88% |
| Anna Hasselborg | 89% | Ikue Kitazawa | 78% |
| Total | 89% | Total | 83% |

=== Bronze medal game ===
Sunday, 24 March, 10:00

| Sheet C | 1 | 2 | 3 | 4 | 5 | 6 | 7 | 8 | 9 | 10 | Final |
|---|---|---|---|---|---|---|---|---|---|---|---|
| Japan (Nakajima) | 0 | 0 | 0 | 1 | 1 | 0 | 1 | 0 | 2 | 0 | 5 |
| South Korea (Kim) 🔨 | 0 | 0 | 1 | 0 | 0 | 2 | 0 | 1 | 0 | 3 | 7 |

Player percentages
| Japan | | South Korea | |
|---|---|---|---|
| Hasumi Ishigooka | 84% | Kim Su-jin | 86% |
| Seina Nakajima | 81% | Yang Tae-i | 69% |
| Chiaki Matsumura | 80% | Kim Hye-rin | 84% |
| Ikue Kitazawa | 86% | Kim Min-ji | 78% |
| Total | 83% | Total | 79% |

=== Final ===
Sunday, 24 March, 16:00

| Sheet C | 1 | 2 | 3 | 4 | 5 | 6 | 7 | 8 | 9 | 10 | 11 | Final |
|---|---|---|---|---|---|---|---|---|---|---|---|---|
| Sweden (Hasselborg) 🔨 | 1 | 0 | 1 | 0 | 2 | 0 | 2 | 0 | 0 | 1 | 0 | 7 |
| Switzerland (Tirinzoni) | 0 | 1 | 0 | 2 | 0 | 1 | 0 | 2 | 1 | 0 | 1 | 8 |

Player percentages
| Sweden | | Switzerland | |
|---|---|---|---|
| Sofia Mabergs | 86% | Melanie Barbezat | 89% |
| Agnes Knochenhauer | 91% | Esther Neuenschwander | 82% |
| Sara McManus | 81% | Silvana Tirinzoni | 73% |
| Anna Hasselborg | 78% | Alina Pätz | 94% |
| Total | 84% | Total | 84% |

== Final standings ==
Key
| Zone loses one guaranteed berth in 2020 World Championship |

| Place | Team |
|---|---|
| 1st place, gold medalist(s) | Switzerland |
| 2nd place, silver medalist(s) | Sweden |
| 3rd place, bronze medalist(s) | South Korea |
| 4 | Japan |
| 5 | Russia |
| 6 | China |
| 7 | United States |
| 8 | Canada |
| 9 | Germany |
| 10 | Scotland |
| 11 | Denmark |
| 12 | Finland |
| 13 | Latvia |

== Statistics ==
=== Top 5 player percentages ===
Final round robin percentages; minimum 9 games

| Leads | % |
|---|---|
| (Sweden) Sofia Mabergs | 88 |
| (Switzerland) Melanie Barbezat | 86 |
| (Scotland) Sophie Sinclair | 86 |
| (Russia) Ekaterina Kuzmina | 84 |
| (China) Ma Jingyi | 84 |
| (United States) Monica Walker | 84 |

| Seconds | % |
|---|---|
| (Russia) Galina Arsenkina | 86 |
| (Sweden) Agnes Knochenhauer | 86 |
| (Canada) Dana Ferguson | 82 |
| (Japan) Seina Nakajima (skip) | 82 |
| (Switzerland) Esther Neuenschwander | 82 |

| Thirds | % |
|---|---|
| (Sweden) Sara McManus | 87 |
| (Canada) Sarah Wilkes | 83 |
| (Russia) Anastasia Bryzgalova | 82 |
| (China) Mei Jie (skip) | 82 |
| (Japan) Chiaki Matsumura | 80 |
| (Switzerland) Silvana Tirinzoni (skip) | 80 |

| Skips | % |
|---|---|
| (Sweden) Anna Hasselborg | 80 |
| (Russia) Alina Kovaleva | 78 |
| (Germany) Daniela Jentsch | 77 |
| (South Korea) Kim Min-ji | 76 |
| (Canada) Chelsea Carey | 75 |
| (Switzerland) Alina Pätz (Fourth) | 75 |
| (China) Wang Rui (Fourth) | 75 |

== Awards ==
The awards and all-star team are as follows:

All-Star Team

- Skip: Anna Hasselborg, Sweden
- Third: Sara McManus, Sweden
- Second: Galina Arsenkina, Russia
- Lead: Sofia Mabergs, Sweden

Frances Brodie Sportsmanship Award

- Wang Rui, China
