= Mei Jie =

Chinese curler

- Curler
- Born: February 4, 1994 (age 32); Harbin, Heilongjiang, China

Team
- Curling club: Harbin CC, Harbin, Heilongjiang

Curling career
- Member Association: China
- World Championship: 1 (2019)
- World Mixed Doubles Championship: 1 (2015)
- Pacific-Asia Championship: 3 (2014, 2015, 2016)
Medal record
Women's curling
Representing China
Pacific-Asia Curling Championships
Gold medal – first place	2014 Karuizawa
Silver medal – second place	2016 Uiseong
Bronze medal – third place	2015 Almaty
Pacific-Asia Junior Curling Championships
Bronze medal – third place	2012 Jeonju City

Mei Jie (Chinese: 梅杰; pinyin: Méi Jié) (born February 4, 1994) is a Chinese curler.

== Career ==
Mei was the alternate for the Chinese women's team at the 2014, 2015 and 2016 Pacific-Asia Curling Championships, but did not play in any games. She was paired up with Huang Jihui at the 2015 World Mixed Doubles Curling Championship, but failed to make the playoffs after posting a 5-4 record. On the World Curling Tour, Mei and her rink won the Avonair Cash Spiel. Mei skipped the Chinese team at the 2017 Winter Universiade, finishing the event with a 5-4 record, missing the playoffs.

Mei began skipping the Chinese women's team in 2019, debuting at the 2019 World Qualification Event, which she won with teammates Wang Rui, Yao Mingyue and Ma Jingyi. This qualified China for the 2019 World Women's Curling Championship, which the team played in. There, she led her rink to a 7-5 round robin record, and then lost in their quarterfinal match up against Switzerland.

== Personal life ==
Mei married Xu Jingtao, a curler in Chinese Men's Curling National Team in 2022.
