= Tyler Hogan =

Australian curler

- Curler
- Born: Tyler Hogan; 11 July 1998 (age 28); Sydney, Australia

Team
- Curling club: Sydney Harbour Curling Club; Sydney, Australia
- Skip: Mitchell Thomas (curler)
- Third: Grant Hamsey
- Second: Tyler Hogan
- Lead: Nicholas Hurford

Curling career
- Pacific-Asia Championship: 1 (2015)

Tyler Hogan (born 11 July 1998) is an Australian curler who represented Australia in the 2015 Pacific-Asia Junior Curling Championships as well as the 2016 World Junior B Curling Championships.
