= Ma Jingyi =

Chinese curler

- Curler
- Born: October 29, 1995 (age 31); Harbin, Heilongjiang, China

Team
- Curling club: Harbin CC, Harbin, Heilongjiang

Curling career
- Member Association: China
- World Championship: 1 (2019)
- Olympic: 1 (2018)
Medal record
Women's curling
Representing China
Pacific-Asia Junior Curling Championships
| Silver medal – second place | 2015 Naseby |

Ma Jingyi (Chinese: 麻敬宜; pinyin: Má Jìngyí; Mandarin pronunciation: [mǎ tɕîŋ ǐ]; born October 29, 1995) is a Chinese curler. She competed in the 2018 Winter Olympics.

== Career ==
=== Juniors ===
Ma represented China at the 2015 Pacific-Asia Junior Curling Championships, playing second for the team. China went undefeated in the round robin but than lost the final 5–4 to South Korea's Kim Eun-bi.

=== Women's ===
Ma won the 2019 World Qualification Event with her team, skipped by Mei Jie which qualified them for the 2019 World Women's Curling Championship. There, they qualified for the playoffs but lost their qualification game to Switzerland's Silvana Tirinzoni who went on to win the event. She also competed at the Olympic Games in 2018 as lead for China. The team finished just outside the playoffs with a 4–5 record. Despite not qualifying for the playoffs, Ma was the third best lead during the round robin stage, finishing behind Lisa Weagle and Becca Hamilton.

== Teams ==
| Season | Skip | Third | Second | Lead | Alternate |
|---|---|---|---|---|---|
| 2016–17 | Wang Bingyu | Zhou Yan | Liu Jinli | Ma Jingyi | Dong Ziqi |
| 2017–18 | Wang Bingyu | Zhou Yan | Liu Jinli | Ma Jingyi | Dong Ziqi |
| 2018–19 | Wang Rui (Fourth) | Mei Jie (Skip) | Yao Mingyue | Ma Jingyi | Zhang Lijun |
| 2019–20 | Wang Rui (Fourth) | Mei Jie (Skip) | Yao Mingyue | Ma Jingyi | |
