= Lucien Lottenbach =

Swiss curler

- Curler
- Born: 4 October 1996 (age 30); Adligenswil, Canton of Lucerne, Switzerland

Team
- Curling club: Luzern Gartenmann Engineering, Lucerne, Team Zug Lottenbach, Zug
- Skip: Lucien Lottenbach
- Third: Rainer Kobler
- Second: Patrick Abächerli
- Lead: Tom Winkelhausen

Curling career
- Member Association: Switzerland
- European Championship: 1 (2019)
Medal record
Curling
European Championships
Silver medal – second place	2019 Helsingborg

Lucien Lottenbach (born 4 October 1996 in Adligenswil, Canton of Lucerne, Switzerland) is a Swiss curler.

== Teams ==
Season	Skip	Third	Second	Lead	Alternate	Coach	Events
2014–15	Lucien Lottenbach	Lukas Christen	Henwy Lochmann	Yannick Jäggi	Lorenz Krammer, Thomas Hauser	Ernst Erb	SJCC 2015 (5th)
2015–16	Lucien Lottenbach	Lukas Christen	Henwy Lochmann	Yannick Jäggi	Tom Winkelhausen	Ernst Erb	SJCC 2016 (bronze)
2016–17	Lucien Lottenbach	Lukas Christen	Henwy Lochmann	Yves Stocker			
2017–18	Lucien Lottenbach	Marc Wagenseil	Patrick Abächerli	Tom Winkelhausen	Etienne Lottenbach		SMCC 2018 (6th)
2018–19	Lucien Lottenbach	Rainer Kobler	Patrick Abächerli	Tom Winkelhausen	Florian Meister		SMCC 2019 (4th)
2019–20	Yannick Schwaller	Michael Brunner	Romano Meier	Marcel Käufeler	Lucien Lottenbach	Bernhard Werthemann	ECC 2019 (silver)
2019–20	Lucien Lottenbach	Rainer Kobler	Patrick Abächerli	Tom Winkelhausen			

== Personal life ==
He started curling in 2006 when he was 12 years old.
