= 2013 China Open (curling) =

World Curling Tour event

- Host city: Tianjin, China
- Dates: September 18–24
- Men's winner: (Canada) Team McEwen
- Curling club: Fort Rouge CC, Winnipeg, Manitoba
- Skip: Mike McEwen
- Third: B. J. Neufeld
- Second: Matt Wozniak
- Lead: Denni Neufeld
- Finalist: (China) Liu Rui
- Women's winner: (South Korea) Team Kim
- Curling club: Gyeonggi-do CC, Gyeonggi-do
- Skip: Kim Ji-sun
- Third: Gim Un-chi
- Second: Shin Mi-sung
- Lead: Lee Seul-bee
- Finalist: (Canada) Chelsea Carey

The 2013 China Open was held from September 18 to 24 in Tianjin, China.

The Canadian representatives, Team McEwen, won the men's event, defeating China's Liu Rui 6–5 in the event final. The team, consisting of Mike McEwen, B. J. Neufeld, Matt Wozniak and Denni Neufeld topped the round robin with a 6–1 record, only losing one game to Sweden's Oskar Eriksson. They then beat Scotland's Logan Gray to advance to the final where they faced China's Liu. The Canadian team led the game early 4–1 before the Chinese tied it up at five all after eight. Following a blank in the ninth end, the McEwen rink scored one in the tenth end to secure the victory.

On the women's side, South Korea's Team Kim defeated Canada's Team Carey 9–6 in the final. The team, with Kim Ji-sun, Gim Un-chi, Shin Mi-sung and Lee Seul-bee just narrowly qualified for the playoffs. After a 3–4 round robin record, the team from Gyeonggi-do beat the Chinese Jiang Yilun rink 9–6 in a tiebreaker to qualify. They then beat the undefeated Wang Bingyu Chinese rink 8–7 in the semifinal before taking on the Chelsea Carey rink in the final. After a tight first half, steals in ends six, seven and eight ultimately led to the Korean team's victory.

== Men ==
=== Teams ===
The teams are listed as follows:

Skip	Third	Second	Lead	Locale
Peter de Boer	Sean Becker	Scott Becker	Kenny Thomson	Auckland, New Zealand
Benoît Schwarz (Fourth)	Peter de Cruz (Skip)	Dominik Märki	Valentin Tanner	Geneva, Switzerland
Oskar Eriksson	Kristian Lindström	Markus Eriksson	Christoffer Sundgren	Karlstad, Sweden
Logan Gray	Glen Muirhead	Ross Paterson	Richard Woods	Stirling, Scotland
Liu Rui	Zang Jialiang	Xu Xiaoming	Ba Dexin	Harbin, China
Mike McEwen	B. J. Neufeld	Matt Wozniak	Denni Neufeld	Winnipeg, Manitoba, Canada
Rasmus Stjerne	Johnny Frederiksen	Mikkel Poulsen	Troels Harry	Hvidovre, Denmark
Thomas Ulsrud	Torger Nergård	Christoffer Svae	Håvard Vad Petersson	Oslo, Norway

=== Round-robin standings ===
Final round-robin standings

Key
Teams to Playoffs
Teams to Tiebreaker

Team	W	L	W–L	PF	PA	EW	EL	BE	SE
(Canada) Mike McEwen	6	1	–	59	39	33	25	3	11
(Norway) Thomas Ulsrud	4	3	2–1; 1–0	50	45	32	32	6	8
(China) Liu Rui	4	3	2–1; 0–1	57	41	32	24	0	13
(Sweden) Oskar Eriksson	4	3	1–2; 1–0	46	45	30	28	2	7
(Scotland) Logan Gray	4	3	1–2; 0–1	40	37	26	24	5	8
(Switzerland) Peter de Cruz	3	4	–	40	41	29	27	4	11
(New Zealand) Peter de Boer	2	5	–	35	54	24	30	6	5
(Denmark) Rasmus Stjerne	1	6	–	31	56	18	34	3	5

=== Round-robin results ===
All draw times are listed in China Standard Time (UTC+08:00).

==== Draw 1 ====
Thursday, September 19, 2:00 pm

Sheet A	1	2	3	4	5	6	7	8	9	10	11	Final
(Norway) Thomas Ulsrud 🔨	1	1	0	2	1	0	0	0	0	0	1	6
(New Zealand) Peter de Boer	0	0	1	0	0	0	1	2	0	1	0	5

Sheet B	1	2	3	4	5	6	7	8	9	10	Final
(Canada) Mike McEwen	0	0	3	0	0	1	2	0	3	X	9
(Scotland) Logan Gray 🔨	0	1	0	1	0	0	0	1	0	X	3

Sheet C	1	2	3	4	5	6	7	8	9	10	Final
(Switzerland) Peter de Cruz	0	1	1	0	0	1	0	0	0	X	3
(Denmark) Rasmus Stjerne 🔨	0	0	0	0	1	0	2	0	3	X	6

Sheet D	1	2	3	4	5	6	7	8	9	10	Final
(Sweden) Oskar Eriksson	0	2	1	0	0	0	3	0	X	X	6
(China) Liu Rui 🔨	2	0	0	2	2	3	0	3	X	X	12

==== Draw 2 ====
Friday, September 20, 9:30 am

Sheet A	1	2	3	4	5	6	7	8	9	10	Final
(Canada) Mike McEwen 🔨	1	0	0	2	0	0	0	1	1	2	7
(Switzerland) Peter de Cruz	0	0	2	0	1	0	2	0	0	0	5

Sheet B	1	2	3	4	5	6	7	8	9	10	11	Final
(Sweden) Oskar Eriksson	0	1	0	2	0	0	2	0	0	1	0	6
(Norway) Thomas Ulsrud 🔨	2	0	1	0	0	2	0	0	1	0	1	7

Sheet C	1	2	3	4	5	6	7	8	9	10	Final
(China) Liu Rui	3	0	1	0	4	2	X	X	X	X	10
(New Zealand) Peter de Boer 🔨	0	0	0	1	0	0	X	X	X	X	1

Sheet D	1	2	3	4	5	6	7	8	9	10	Final
(Scotland) Logan Gray	0	2	1	1	2	3	X	X	X	X	9
(Denmark) Rasmus Stjerne 🔨	2	0	0	0	0	0	X	X	X	X	2

==== Draw 3 ====
Friday, September 20, 6:30 pm

Sheet A	1	2	3	4	5	6	7	8	9	10	11	Final
(Scotland) Logan Gray	0	0	0	2	1	0	1	0	2	0	2	8
(Norway) Thomas Ulsrud 🔨	0	1	0	0	0	2	0	2	0	1	0	6

Sheet B	1	2	3	4	5	6	7	8	9	10	Final
(Switzerland) Peter de Cruz 🔨	1	1	1	0	1	0	0	2	2	X	8
(China) Liu Rui	0	0	0	2	0	1	1	0	0	X	4

Sheet C	1	2	3	4	5	6	7	8	9	10	Final
(Denmark) Rasmus Stjerne	0	0	0	1	0	1	0	X	X	X	2
(Sweden) Oskar Eriksson 🔨	1	1	1	0	3	0	2	X	X	X	8

Sheet D	1	2	3	4	5	6	7	8	9	10	Final
(Canada) Mike McEwen	0	3	1	0	1	3	2	X	X	X	10
(New Zealand) Peter de Boer 🔨	2	0	0	1	0	0	0	X	X	X	3

==== Draw 4 ====
Saturday, September 21, 2:00 pm

Sheet A	1	2	3	4	5	6	7	8	9	10	Final
(Denmark) Rasmus Stjerne	0	2	3	0	0	0	0	3	0	X	8
(China) Liu Rui 🔨	1	0	0	2	1	1	2	0	3	X	10

Sheet B	1	2	3	4	5	6	7	8	9	10	Final
(Scotland) Logan Gray 🔨	1	0	2	0	3	2	0	X	X	X	8
(New Zealand) Peter de Boer	0	1	0	1	0	0	1	X	X	X	3

Sheet C	1	2	3	4	5	6	7	8	9	10	11	Final
(Canada) Mike McEwen	0	2	0	2	2	0	0	2	0	0	1	9
(Norway) Thomas Ulsrud 🔨	2	0	3	0	0	1	1	0	0	1	0	8

Sheet D	1	2	3	4	5	6	7	8	9	10	Final
(Switzerland) Peter de Cruz	0	1	0	0	3	1	0	1	1	X	7
(Sweden) Oskar Eriksson 🔨	1	0	1	0	0	0	1	0	0	X	3

==== Draw 5 ====
Sunday, September 22, 9:30 am

Sheet A	1	2	3	4	5	6	7	8	9	10	Final
(Sweden) Oskar Eriksson 🔨	3	0	2	0	2	1	0	0	0	1	9
(Canada) Mike McEwen	0	2	0	2	0	0	1	1	1	0	7

Sheet B	1	2	3	4	5	6	7	8	9	10	Final
(Norway) Thomas Ulsrud	2	0	0	1	5	0	1	1	X	X	10
(Denmark) Rasmus Stjerne 🔨	0	2	1	0	0	1	0	0	X	X	4

Sheet C	1	2	3	4	5	6	7	8	9	10	Final
(New Zealand) Peter de Boer	0	0	0	3	1	0	0	2	0	2	8
(Switzerland) Peter de Cruz 🔨	1	0	0	0	0	4	0	0	1	0	6

Sheet D	1	2	3	4	5	6	7	8	9	10	Final
(China) Liu Rui 🔨	0	2	0	0	1	2	0	2	X	X	7
(Scotland) Logan Gray	1	0	0	1	0	0	0	0	X	X	2

==== Draw 6 ====
Sunday, September 22, 6:30 pm

Sheet A	1	2	3	4	5	6	7	8	9	10	Final
(New Zealand) Peter de Boer 🔨	1	2	0	1	1	0	2	0	0	1	8
(Denmark) Rasmus Stjerne	0	0	2	0	0	1	0	2	1	0	6

Sheet B	1	2	3	4	5	6	7	8	9	10	Final
(China) Liu Rui 🔨	1	0	1	0	3	0	2	0	1	0	8
(Canada) Mike McEwen	0	2	0	2	0	3	0	1	0	1	9

Sheet C	1	2	3	4	5	6	7	8	9	10	Final
(Sweden) Oskar Eriksson 🔨	1	0	1	0	0	0	2	1	1	X	6
(Scotland) Logan Gray	0	1	0	2	0	0	0	0	0	X	3

Sheet D	1	2	3	4	5	6	7	8	9	10	Final
(Norway) Thomas Ulsrud 🔨	0	0	1	0	0	1	3	0	1	0	6
(Switzerland) Peter de Cruz	1	1	0	1	1	0	0	2	0	1	7

==== Draw 7 ====
Monday, September 23, 2:00 pm

Sheet A	1	2	3	4	5	6	7	8	9	10	Final
(Switzerland) Peter de Cruz	0	2	0	0	0	0	1	0	1	0	4
(Scotland) Logan Gray 🔨	2	0	0	1	1	0	0	2	0	1	7

Sheet B	1	2	3	4	5	6	7	8	9	10	Final
(New Zealand) Peter de Boer	0	0	0	2	0	2	0	1	0	2	7
(Sweden) Oskar Eriksson 🔨	2	1	0	0	2	0	1	0	2	0	8

Sheet C	1	2	3	4	5	6	7	8	9	10	Final
(Norway) Thomas Ulsrud	0	0	0	2	1	0	3	0	0	1	7
(China) Liu Rui 🔨	2	0	1	0	0	1	0	1	1	0	6

Sheet D	1	2	3	4	5	6	7	8	9	10	Final
(Denmark) Rasmus Stjerne	1	0	0	0	2	0	0	0	X	X	3
(Canada) Mike McEwen 🔨	0	1	0	2	0	0	1	4	X	X	8

=== Tiebreaker ===
Monday, September 23, 6:30 pm

Sheet B	1	2	3	4	5	6	7	8	9	10	Final
(Sweden) Oskar Eriksson 🔨	1	0	3	1	0	0	2	0	0	0	7
(Scotland) Logan Gray	0	2	0	0	2	1	0	1	1	3	10

=== Playoffs ===
Semifinals
1	(Canada) Mike McEwen	8
4	(Scotland) Logan Gray	4
2	(Norway) Thomas Ulsrud	4
3	(China) Liu Rui	6

Final
1	(Canada) Mike McEwen	6
3	(China) Liu Rui	5

Bronze medal game
4	(Scotland) Logan Gray	2
2	(Norway) Thomas Ulsrud	9

==== Semifinals ====
Tuesday, September 24, 9:30 am

Sheet A	1	2	3	4	5	6	7	8	9	10	Final
(Canada) Mike McEwen 🔨	2	0	2	0	3	0	1	0	X	X	8
(Scotland) Logan Gray	0	0	0	1	0	2	0	1	X	X	4

Sheet B	1	2	3	4	5	6	7	8	9	10	Final
(Norway) Thomas Ulsrud 🔨	0	1	0	1	0	0	0	2	0	X	4
(China) Liu Rui	2	0	1	0	0	1	1	0	1	X	6

==== Bronze medal game ====
Tuesday, September 24, 2:30 pm

Sheet D	1	2	3	4	5	6	7	8	9	10	Final
(Scotland) Logan Gray 🔨	2	0	0	0	0	0	0	0	X	X	2
(Norway) Thomas Ulsrud	0	3	1	1	1	1	2	0	X	X	9

==== Final ====
Tuesday, September 24, 2:30 pm

Sheet C	1	2	3	4	5	6	7	8	9	10	Final
(Canada) Mike McEwen 🔨	2	0	2	0	0	1	0	0	0	1	6
(China) Liu Rui	0	1	0	2	0	0	1	1	0	0	5

== Women ==
=== Teams ===
The teams are listed as follows:

Skip	Third	Second	Lead	Locale
Kerry Barr	Rachael Simms	Rhiann Macleod	Barbara McPake	Stirling, Scotland
Chelsea Carey	Kristy McDonald	Kristen Foster	Lindsay Titheridge	Winnipeg, Manitoba, Canada
Anna Hasselborg	Karin Rudström	Agnes Knochenhauer	Zandra Flyg	Gävle, Sweden
Jiang Yilun	Wang Rui	Yao Mingyue	She Qiutong	Harbin, China
Jennifer Jones	Kaitlyn Lawes	Jill Officer	Dawn McEwen	Winnipeg, Manitoba, Canada
Kim Ji-sun	Gim Un-chi	Shin Mi-sung	Lee Seul-bee	Gyeonggi-do, South Korea
Lene Nielsen	Helle Simonsen	Jeanne Ellegaard	Maria Poulsen	Hvidovre, Denmark
Wang Bingyu	Liu Yin	Yue Qingshuang	Zhou Yan	Harbin, China

=== Round-robin standings ===
Final round-robin standings

Key
Teams to Playoffs
Teams to Tiebreaker

Team	W	L	W–L	PF	PA	EW	EL	BE	SE
(China) Wang Bingyu	7	0	–	61	16	31	13	2	15
(Canada) Jennifer Jones	5	2	–	53	42	28	27	3	5
(Canada) Chelsea Carey	4	3	–	46	50	25	29	4	3
(China) Jiang Yilun	3	4	1–0	42	55	28	30	2	5
(South Korea) Kim Ji-sun	3	4	0–1	48	54	30	30	2	10
(Scotland) Kerry Barr	2	5	1–1	45	52	30	33	2	10
(Denmark) Lene Nielsen	2	5	1–1	41	53	27	31	0	7
(Sweden) Anna Hasselborg	2	5	1–1	37	51	25	31	7	5

=== Round-robin results ===
All draw times are listed in China Standard Time (UTC+08:00).

==== Draw 1 ====
Thursday, September 19, 9:30 am

Sheet A	1	2	3	4	5	6	7	8	9	10	Final
(Sweden) Anna Hasselborg	0	0	3	1	0	0	0	2	0	X	6
(Canada) Chelsea Carey 🔨	2	0	0	0	2	0	2	0	3	X	9

Sheet B	1	2	3	4	5	6	7	8	9	10	Final
(China) Wang Bingyu 🔨	2	1	0	3	0	0	5	X	X	X	11
(China) Jiang Yilun	0	0	1	0	0	1	0	X	X	X	2

Sheet C	1	2	3	4	5	6	7	8	9	10	Final
(Denmark) Lene Nielsen 🔨	0	0	1	1	0	0	0	0	X	X	2
(Scotland) Kerry Barr	1	2	0	0	0	1	1	1	X	X	6

Sheet D	1	2	3	4	5	6	7	8	9	10	Final
(South Korea) Kim Ji-sun	0	0	3	1	0	0	1	0	X	X	5
(Canada) Jennifer Jones 🔨	2	1	0	0	4	1	0	3	X	X	11

==== Draw 2 ====
Thursday, September 19, 6:30 pm

Sheet A	1	2	3	4	5	6	7	8	9	10	Final
(China) Wang Bingyu 🔨	1	1	2	3	0	0	X	X	X	X	7
(Denmark) Lene Nielsen	0	0	0	0	1	1	X	X	X	X	2

Sheet B	1	2	3	4	5	6	7	8	9	10	Final
(South Korea) Kim Ji-sun 🔨	2	1	0	1	1	1	0	0	2	X	8
(Sweden) Anna Hasselborg	0	0	2	0	0	0	2	1	0	X	5

Sheet C	1	2	3	4	5	6	7	8	9	10	Final
(Canada) Jennifer Jones 🔨	0	0	1	0	1	0	0	2	0	X	4
(Canada) Chelsea Carey	0	0	0	2	0	1	1	0	4	X	8

Sheet D	1	2	3	4	5	6	7	8	9	10	Final
(China) Jiang Yilun 🔨	0	0	1	0	0	3	0	2	0	0	6
(Scotland) Kerry Barr	0	1	0	0	2	0	2	0	3	1	9

==== Draw 3 ====
Friday, September 20, 2:00 pm

Sheet A	1	2	3	4	5	6	7	8	9	10	Final
(China) Jiang Yilun	0	0	0	2	0	1	0	2	0	0	5
(Sweden) Anna Hasselborg 🔨	0	0	2	0	1	0	1	0	1	2	7

Sheet B	1	2	3	4	5	6	7	8	9	10	Final
(Denmark) Lene Nielsen 🔨	1	0	2	0	1	0	1	1	0	X	6
(Canada) Jennifer Jones	0	3	0	1	0	3	0	0	1	X	8

Sheet C	1	2	3	4	5	6	7	8	9	10	Final
(Scotland) Kerry Barr 🔨	1	0	2	0	2	0	0	0	0	X	5
(South Korea) Kim Ji-sun	0	1	0	2	0	0	3	3	2	X	11

Sheet D	1	2	3	4	5	6	7	8	9	10	Final
(China) Wang Bingyu 🔨	2	2	0	0	4	0	X	X	X	X	8
(Canada) Chelsea Carey	0	0	0	1	0	0	X	X	X	X	1

==== Draw 4 ====
Saturday, September 21, 9:30 am

Sheet A	1	2	3	4	5	6	7	8	9	10	Final
(Scotland) Kerry Barr	0	1	0	1	0	1	1	1	0	0	5
(Canada) Jennifer Jones 🔨	2	0	1	0	2	0	0	0	1	2	8

Sheet B	1	2	3	4	5	6	7	8	9	10	Final
(China) Jiang Yilun 🔨	1	0	2	0	1	0	2	0	2	0	8
(Canada) Chelsea Carey	0	1	0	2	0	0	0	2	0	1	6

Sheet C	1	2	3	4	5	6	7	8	9	10	Final
(China) Wang Bingyu 🔨	2	0	0	1	2	2	1	X	X	X	8
(Sweden) Anna Hasselborg	0	0	1	0	0	0	0	X	X	X	1

Sheet D	1	2	3	4	5	6	7	8	9	10	Final
(Denmark) Lene Nielsen 🔨	2	0	1	2	0	3	0	0	0	3	11
(South Korea) Kim Ji-sun	0	4	0	0	1	0	1	2	1	0	9

==== Draw 5 ====
Saturday, September 21, 6:30 pm

Sheet A	1	2	3	4	5	6	7	8	9	10	Final
(South Korea) Kim Ji-sun	0	1	0	1	0	0	0	X	X	X	2
(China) Wang Bingyu 🔨	2	0	4	0	2	1	2	X	X	X	11

Sheet B	1	2	3	4	5	6	7	8	9	10	Final
(Sweden) Anna Hasselborg 🔨	1	0	1	0	1	0	1	3	0	1	8
(Scotland) Kerry Barr	0	2	0	2	0	1	0	0	1	0	6

Sheet C	1	2	3	4	5	6	7	8	9	10	Final
(Canada) Chelsea Carey 🔨	0	1	0	0	3	0	0	2	0	3	9
(Denmark) Lene Nielsen	0	0	2	1	0	1	1	0	2	0	7

Sheet D	1	2	3	4	5	6	7	8	9	10	Final
(Canada) Jennifer Jones 🔨	1	0	4	0	5	0	0	2	X	X	12
(China) Jiang Yilun	0	1	0	1	0	1	2	0	X	X	5

==== Draw 6 ====
Sunday, September 22, 2:00 pm

Sheet A	1	2	3	4	5	6	7	8	9	10	Final
(Canada) Chelsea Carey	0	2	0	1	0	0	3	0	1	3	10
(Scotland) Kerry Barr 🔨	3	0	1	0	1	1	0	2	0	0	8

Sheet B	1	2	3	4	5	6	7	8	9	10	Final
(Canada) Jennifer Jones	0	0	0	1	1	0	X	X	X	X	2
(China) Wang Bingyu 🔨	0	3	3	0	0	3	X	X	X	X	9

Sheet C	1	2	3	4	5	6	7	8	9	10	Final
(South Korea) Kim Ji-sun	0	1	0	0	0	1	1	0	1	0	4
(China) Jiang Yilun 🔨	2	0	1	1	1	0	0	1	0	2	8

Sheet D	1	2	3	4	5	6	7	8	9	10	Final
(Sweden) Anna Hasselborg 🔨	1	0	0	2	2	0	0	1	0	0	6
(Denmark) Lene Nielsen	0	1	0	0	0	3	0	0	1	2	7

==== Draw 7 ====
Monday, September 23, 9:30 am

Sheet A	1	2	3	4	5	6	7	8	9	10	Final
(Denmark) Lene Nielsen 🔨	2	0	0	2	0	1	0	1	0	X	6
(China) Jiang Yilun	0	2	2	0	2	0	1	0	1	X	8

Sheet B	1	2	3	4	5	6	7	8	9	10	Final
(Canada) Chelsea Carey	0	1	0	1	0	0	0	1	0	X	3
(South Korea) Kim Ji-sun 🔨	1	0	1	0	0	2	1	0	4	X	9

Sheet C	1	2	3	4	5	6	7	8	9	10	Final
(Sweden) Anna Hasselborg	0	1	0	2	0	0	1	0	0	X	4
(Canada) Jennifer Jones 🔨	2	0	1	0	0	2	0	2	1	X	8

Sheet D	1	2	3	4	5	6	7	8	9	10	11	Final
(Scotland) Kerry Barr	0	0	0	2	0	0	3	1	0	0	0	6
(China) Wang Bingyu 🔨	0	1	1	0	1	1	0	0	1	1	1	7

=== Tiebreaker ===
Monday, September 23, 6:30 pm

Sheet C	1	2	3	4	5	6	7	8	9	10	11	Final
(China) Jiang Yilun 🔨	1	0	0	1	1	0	1	0	1	1	0	6
(South Korea) Kim Ji-sun	0	1	1	0	0	1	0	3	0	0	3	9

=== Playoffs ===
Semifinals
1	(China) Wang Bingyu	7
4	(South Korea) Kim Ji-sun	8
2	(Canada) Jennifer Jones	4
3	(Canada) Chelsea Carey	6

Final
4	(South Korea) Kim Ji-sun	9
3	(Canada) Chelsea Carey	6

Bronze medal game
1	(China) Wang Bingyu	10
2	(Canada) Jennifer Jones	6

==== Semifinals ====
Tuesday, September 24, 9:30 am

Sheet C	1	2	3	4	5	6	7	8	9	10	11	Final
(China) Wang Bingyu 🔨	2	0	1	0	1	0	2	0	0	1	0	7
(South Korea) Kim Ji-sun	0	2	0	1	0	1	0	2	1	0	1	8

Sheet D	1	2	3	4	5	6	7	8	9	10	Final
(Canada) Jennifer Jones 🔨	1	0	0	1	0	1	0	1	0	X	4
(Canada) Chelsea Carey	0	2	1	0	1	0	1	0	1	X	6

==== Bronze medal game ====
Tuesday, September 24, 2:30 pm

Sheet A	1	2	3	4	5	6	7	8	9	10	Final
(China) Wang Bingyu 🔨	0	3	2	0	1	0	0	1	2	1	10
(Canada) Jennifer Jones	1	0	0	1	0	4	0	0	0	0	6

==== Final ====
Tuesday, September 24, 2:30 pm

Sheet B	1	2	3	4	5	6	7	8	9	10	Final
(South Korea) Kim Ji-sun	0	2	0	3	0	1	1	1	0	1	9
(Canada) Chelsea Carey 🔨	2	0	1	0	2	0	0	0	1	0	6
