= World Qualification Event =

- Established: 2019
- Abolished: 2022

The World Qualification Event was an annual curling tournament first held in 2019 by the World Curling Federation. Eight men's and women's teams who had not already qualified for the World Curling Championships competed for the final two spots in the championships. The event was discontinued for the 2022–23 season with the creation of the new Pan Continental Curling Championships.

== Qualification ==
Eight teams competed in the World Qualification Event:

- Hosting member association
- One team from the Americas Challenge
- Four teams from the European Curling Championships
- Two teams from the Pacific-Asia Curling Championships

== Summary ==
=== Men ===
Year	Champion		Finalist		Host
Year	Country	Team	Country	Team	Host
2019	South Korea	Kim Soo-hyuk, Jeong Byeong-jin, Lee Jeong-jae, Lee Dong-hyeong, Hwang Hyeon-jun	Netherlands	Wouter Gösgens (Fourth), Jaap van Dorp (Skip), Laurens Hoekman, Carlo Glasbergen, Alexander Magan	Naseby, New Zealand
2020	China	Zou Qiang, Tian Jiafeng, Wang Zhiyu, Xu Jingtao, Han Peng	Russia	Sergey Glukhov, Dmitry Mironov, Evgeny Klimov, Anton Kalalb, Aleksey Tuzov	Lohja, Finland
2021	Cancelled				
2022	Russia	Sergey Glukhov, Evgeny Klimov, Dmitry Mironov, Anton Kalalb, Daniil Goriachev	Netherlands	Wouter Gösgens, Jaap van Dorp, Laurens Hoekman, Carlo Glasbergen, Alexander Magan	Lohja, Finland

=== Women ===
Year	Champion		Finalist		Host
Year	Country	Team	Country	Team	Host
2019	China	Wang Rui (Fourth), Mei Jie (Skip), Yao Mingyue, Ma Jingyi, Wang Meini	Finland	Oona Kauste, Eszter Juhász, Maija Salmiovirta, Lotta Immonen	Naseby, New Zealand
2020	South Korea	Gim Un-chi, Um Min-ji, Kim Su-ji, Seol Ye-eun, Seol Ye-ji	Italy	Veronica Zappone, Stefania Constantini, Angela Romei, Giulia Zardini Lacedelli, Elena Dami	Lohja, Finland
2021	Cancelled				
2022	Denmark	Madeleine Dupont, Mathilde Halse, Denise Dupont, My Larsen	Norway	Marianne Rørvik, Mille Haslev Nordbye, Eirin Mesloe, Martine Rønning	Lohja, Finland
