= Black Diamond / High River Cash =

World Curling Tour event

Location in Canada (Highwood CC)
Location in Canada (Oilfields CC)

The Black Diamond / High River Cash was an annual bonspiel on the men's World Curling Tour. It was held annually in late November / early December at the Oilfields Curling Club in Diamond Valley, Alberta (formerly Black Diamond) and the Highwood Curling Club in High River, Alberta.

The purse for the event is $7,100.

== Past champions ==
Year	Winning team	Runner up team	Purse (CAD)	Winner's share
2013	(Alberta) Robert Schlender, Aaron Sluchinski, Justin Sluchinski, Dylan Webster	(Alberta) Dean Mamer, Vance Elder, Jason Stannard, Wallace Hollingshead	$8,000	$2,500
2014	(Alberta) Brock Virtue, Charley Thomas, Darren Moulding, Kalynn Park	(South Korea) Kim Seung-min, Jeong Yeong-seok, Oh Seung-hoon, Park Sewon	$8,000	$2,400
2015	(Alberta) Kevin Park, Adam Norget, Kerr Drummond, Matthew Brown	(Alberta) Bob Genoway, Dean Mamer, Sean Morris, Wallace Hollingshead	$8,000	$2,000
2016	(Alberta) Kevin Yablonski, Michael Roy, Scott Garnett, Matthew McDonald	(Alberta) Rob Johnson, Steve Mackey, Jeremie Crone, Andre Fagnon	$11,000	$2,000
2017	(Alberta) Aaron Sluchinski, Dean Mamer, Kerr Drummond, Dylan Webster	(Alberta) Chad Dahlseide, James Wenzel, Mike Coolidge, Rob Lane	$7,900	$2,000
2018	(Alberta) Thomas Usselman, Aaron Sarafinchan, Morgan Van Doesburg, Brad Kokoroyannis	(Alberta) Desmond Young, Dustin Mikush, Jacob Libbus, Gabriel Dyck	$7,100	$2,000
2019	(China) Zou Qiang, Wang Zhiyu, Tian Jiafeng, Xu Jingtao	(Alberta) Jeremy Harty, Kyler Kleibrink, Joel Berger, Kurtis Goller	$7,100	$2,000
