= 2020 World Men's Curling Championship =

- Host city: Glasgow, Scotland
- Arena: Emirates Arena, Glasgow
- Dates: March 28 – April 5, 2020 (cancelled)

The 2020 World Men's Curling Championship (branded as the 2020 LGT World Men's Curling Championship for sponsorship reasons) was scheduled to be held from March 28 to April 5 at the Emirates Arena in Glasgow, Scotland. On March 14, 2020, the World Curling Federation announced the event was cancelled due to the COVID-19 pandemic.

The event was set to be the first event to start gathering points towards the 2022 Winter Olympic Qualification. Upon cancellation, the qualifying process was left unclear. It was later announced that any country who were scheduled to compete in the event and did not qualify through the 2021 World Championships would take part in a final Olympic Qualifying Tournament in December 2021.

== Qualification ==
The following nations qualified to participate in the 2020 World Men's Curling Championship:

Event	Vacancies	Qualified
Host nation	1	Scotland
2019 Americas Challenge	2	Canada; United States
2019 European Curling Championships	7	Sweden; Switzerland; Denmark; Italy; Norway; Germany; Netherlands
2019 Pacific-Asia Curling Championships	1	South Korea
2020 World Qualification Event	2	China; Russia
TOTAL	13	

=== World Ranking ===
The World Curling Federation World Ranking tracks and lists the success of all Member Associations.

Member Associations	Rank	Points
Sweden	1	89.020
Canada	2	75.980
United States	3	71.029
Switzerland	4	65.196
Scotland	5	52.059
Norway	7	40.392
South Korea	8	35.343
Italy	9	34.461
Denmark	10	24.520
Russia	11	19.412
Germany	12	18.578
China	13	18.358
Netherlands	14	16.951

== Teams ==
The teams were to be:

Canada	China	Denmark	Germany	Italy
St. John's CC, St. John's Skip: Brad Gushue; Third: Mark Nichols; Second: Brett Gallant; Lead: Geoff Walker; Alternate: Jeff Thomas	Harbin CC, Harbin Skip: Zou Qiang; Third: Tian Jiafeng; Second: Wang Zhiyu; Lead: Xu Jingtao; Alternate: Han Peng	Gentofte CC, Gentofte & Hvidovre CC, Hvidovre Skip: Tobias Thune; Third: Kasper Wiksten; Second: Daniel Poulsen; Lead: Oliver Rosenkrands Søe; Alternate: Kenneth Hertsdahl	EC Oberstdorf, Oberstdorf Skip: Marc Muskatewitz; Third: Sixten Totzek; Second: Joshua Sutor; Lead: Dominik Greindl; Alternate: Klaudius Harsch	SC Pinerolo, Pinerolo Skip: Joël Retornaz; Third Amos Mosaner; Second: Sebastiano Arman; Lead: Simone Gonin; Alternate: Alberto Pimpini
Netherlands	Norway	Russia	Scotland	South Korea
CC PWA Zoetermeer, Zoetermeer Fourth: Wouter Gösgens; Skip: Jaap van Dorp; Second: Laurens Hoekman; Lead: Carlo Glasbergen; Alternate: Alexander Magan	Snarøen CC, Oslo Skip: Thomas Ulsrud; Third: Steffen Walstad; Second: Markus Høiberg; Lead: Magnus Vågberg; Alternate: Torger Nergård	Ice Cube CC, Sochi Skip: Sergey Glukhov; Third: Alexey Tuzov; Second: Evgeny Klimov; Lead: Anton Kalalb; Alternate: Dmitry Mironov	Gogar Park CC, Edinburgh Skip: Bruce Mouat; Third: Grant Hardie; Second: Bobby Lammie; Lead: Hammy McMillan Jr. Alternate: Ross Whyte	Uiseong CC, Uiseong Skip: Kim Chang-min; Third: Lee Ki-jeong; Second: Kim Hak-kyun; Lead: Lee Ki-bok
Sweden	Switzerland	United States		
Karlstads CK, Karlstad Skip: Niklas Edin; Third: Oskar Eriksson; Second: Rasmus Wranå; Lead: Christoffer Sundgren; Alternate: Daniel Magnusson	Baden Regio CC, Baden Skip: Yannick Schwaller; Third: Michael Brunner; Second: Romano Meier; Lead: Marcel Käufeler; Alternate: Lucien Lottenbach	Duluth CC, Duluth Skip: John Shuster; Third: Chris Plys; Second: Matt Hamilton; Lead: John Landsteiner; Alternate: Colin Hufman		

== National playdowns ==
- (Canada) 2020 Tim Hortons Brier
- 2020 United States Men's Curling Championship
