= 2020 World Qualification Event =

- Host city: Lohja, Finland
- Arena: Kisakallio Sports Institute
- Dates: January 13-18
- Men's winner: China
- Skip: Zou Qiang
- Third: Tian Jiafeng
- Second: Wang Zhiyu
- Lead: Xu Jingtao
- Alternate: Han Peng
- Finalist: Russia
- Women's winner: South Korea
- Skip: Gim Un-chi
- Third: Um Min-ji
- Second: Kim Su-ji
- Lead: Seol Ye-eun
- Alternate: Seol Ye-ji
- Finalist: Italy

The 2020 World Qualification Event for the World Curling Championships was held from January 13 to 18 at the Kisakallio Sports Institute in Lohja, Finland. The competition consisted of sixteen teams divided evenly into men's and women's divisions. The top two teams in the men's division qualified to compete at the 2020 World Men's Championship and similarly the top two teams in the women's division qualified to compete at the 2020 World Women's Championship. China and Russia qualified in the men's division and South Korea and Italy qualified in the women's division.

== Men ==
=== Qualification ===
Eight men's teams will qualify to participate in the 2020 World Qualification Event, through the following methods:

Event	Vacancies	Qualified
Host nation	1	Finland
2019 Americas Challenge	1	Mexico
2019 European Curling Championships	4	Russia; England; Czech Republic; Poland
2019 Pacific-Asia Curling Championships	2	Japan; China
TOTAL	8	

=== Teams ===
China	Czech Republic	England	Finland
Skip: Zou Qiang; Third: Tian Jiafeng; Second: Wang Zhiyu; Lead: Xu Jingtao; Alternate: Han Peng	Skip: Lukáš Klíma; Third: Marek Černovský; Second: Jiří Candra; Lead: Samuel Mokriš; Alternate: Radek Boháč	Skip: Andrew Reed; Third: Andrew Woolston; Second: Scott Gibson; Lead: Fraser Clark; Alternate: Thomas Jaeggi	Fourth: Jere Sullanmä; Third: Jason Moore; Second: Iikko Santti; Skip: Jermu Pöllänen; Alternate: Melker Lundberg
Japan	Mexico	Poland	Russia
Skip: Yuta Matsumura; Third: Tetsuro Shimizu; Second: Yasumasa Tanida; Lead: Shinya Abe; Alternate: Kosuke Aita	Skip: Diego Tompkins; Third: Ramy Cohen Masri; Second: Ismael Abreu; Lead: Mateo Tompkins; Alternate: Ezra Cohen Ezban	Skip: Borys Jasiecki; Third: Konrad Stych; Second: Krzysztof Domin; Lead: Bartosz Łobaza; Alternate: Kasper Knebloch	Skip: Sergey Glukhov; Third: Dmitry Mironov; Second: Evgeny Klimov; Lead: Anton Kalalb; Alternate: Aleksey Tuzov

=== Round-robin standings ===
Final round-robin standings

Key
Teams to Playoffs

Country	Skip	W	L	W–L	DSC
China	Zou Qiang	6	1	–	49.01
Russia	Sergey Glukhov	5	2	1–0	42.52
Japan	Yuta Matsumura	5	2	0–1	17.36
Finland	Jermu Pöllänen	4	3	–	39.43
Czech Republic	Lukáš Klíma	3	4	1–0	43.32
Poland	Borys Jasiecki	3	4	0–1	39.66
England	Andrew Reed	2	5	–	43.72
Mexico	Diego Tompkins	0	7	–	89.28

=== Round-robin results ===
All draws are listed in Eastern European Time (UTC+02:00).

==== Draw 1 ====
Monday, January 13, 19:00

Sheet A	1	2	3	4	5	6	7	8	9	10	Final
China (Zou)	0	1	0	0	0	0	2	X	X	X	3
Finland (Pöllänen) 🔨	3	0	2	1	1	1	0	X	X	X	8

Sheet B	1	2	3	4	5	6	7	8	9	10	Final
Mexico (Tompkins)	0	0	1	0	0	1	0	X	X	X	2
Poland (Jasiecki) 🔨	2	1	0	3	2	0	4	X	X	X	12

Sheet C	1	2	3	4	5	6	7	8	9	10	Final
Japan (Matsumura) 🔨	0	1	0	0	0	1	0	2	0	X	4
Russia (Glukhov)	1	0	0	0	2	0	3	0	2	X	8

Sheet D	1	2	3	4	5	6	7	8	9	10	Final
England (Reed) 🔨	0	0	1	0	1	0	0	1	0	X	3
Czech Republic (Klíma)	0	0	0	2	0	1	0	0	2	X	5

==== Draw 2 ====
Tuesday, January 14, 14:00

Sheet A	1	2	3	4	5	6	7	8	9	10	Final
Czech Republic (Klíma) 🔨	1	0	2	0	0	0	1	0	X	X	4
Russia (Glukhov)	0	1	0	2	2	3	0	3	X	X	11

Sheet B	1	2	3	4	5	6	7	8	9	10	Final
England (Reed)	0	0	1	0	1	0	X	X	X	X	2
Japan (Matsumura) 🔨	2	1	0	3	0	2	X	X	X	X	8

Sheet C	1	2	3	4	5	6	7	8	9	10	Final
China (Zou) 🔨	3	2	1	2	1	0	0	2	X	X	11
Mexico (Tompkins)	0	0	0	0	0	2	1	0	X	X	3

Sheet D	1	2	3	4	5	6	7	8	9	10	11	Final
Finland (Pöllänen) 🔨	1	0	0	3	0	0	0	2	0	1	0	7
Poland (Jasiecki)	0	1	1	0	1	2	0	0	2	0	1	8

==== Draw 3 ====
Wednesday, January 15, 09:00

Sheet A	1	2	3	4	5	6	7	8	9	10	Final
England (Reed) 🔨	1	0	3	0	0	0	1	0	0	X	5
Poland (Jasiecki)	0	2	0	2	1	0	0	1	1	X	7

Sheet B	1	2	3	4	5	6	7	8	9	10	11	Final
China (Zou)	2	0	2	0	0	0	0	0	1	0	2	7
Russia (Glukhov) 🔨	0	2	0	0	2	0	0	0	0	1	0	5

Sheet C	1	2	3	4	5	6	7	8	9	10	Final
Finland (Pöllänen) 🔨	1	0	0	0	3	5	0	1	0	X	10
Czech Republic (Klíma)	0	1	1	2	0	0	1	0	2	X	7

Sheet D	1	2	3	4	5	6	7	8	9	10	Final
Japan (Matsumura) 🔨	2	1	0	0	2	0	3	1	X	X	9
Mexico (Tompkins)	0	0	0	1	0	1	0	0	X	X	2

==== Draw 4 ====
Wednesday, January 15, 19:00

Sheet A	1	2	3	4	5	6	7	8	9	10	Final
Finland (Pöllänen) 🔨	3	2	2	1	1	4	X	X	X	X	13
Mexico (Tompkins)	0	0	0	0	0	0	X	X	X	X	0

Sheet B	1	2	3	4	5	6	7	8	9	10	Final
Russia (Glukhov)	0	2	1	2	0	1	0	1	3	X	10
England (Reed) 🔨	1	0	0	0	1	0	1	0	0	X	3

Sheet C	1	2	3	4	5	6	7	8	9	10	Final
Czech Republic (Klíma)	0	0	1	0	0	2	0	X	X	X	3
Japan (Matsumura) 🔨	0	1	0	3	2	0	4	X	X	X	10

Sheet D	1	2	3	4	5	6	7	8	9	10	Final
Poland (Jasiecki) 🔨	1	0	3	0	0	0	1	1	0	X	6
China (Zou)	0	1	0	1	1	4	0	0	4	X	11

==== Draw 5 ====
Thursday, January 16, 14:00

Sheet A	1	2	3	4	5	6	7	8	9	10	Final
Japan (Matsumura) 🔨	0	1	0	2	0	0	0	1	1	0	5
China (Zou)	0	0	2	0	1	1	1	0	0	1	6

Sheet B	1	2	3	4	5	6	7	8	9	10	11	Final
Poland (Jasiecki) 🔨	1	0	0	2	1	0	2	0	0	2	0	8
Czech Republic (Klíma)	0	2	2	0	0	3	0	1	0	0	1	9

Sheet C	1	2	3	4	5	6	7	8	9	10	Final
England (Reed) 🔨	3	0	2	1	1	0	0	1	1	X	9
Finland (Pöllänen)	0	3	0	0	0	1	0	0	0	X	4

Sheet D	1	2	3	4	5	6	7	8	9	10	Final
Mexico (Tompkins)	0	3	0	1	0	2	0	1	0	X	7
Russia (Glukhov) 🔨	1	0	4	0	3	0	3	0	4	X	15

==== Draw 6 ====
Friday, January 17, 09:00

Sheet A	1	2	3	4	5	6	7	8	9	10	Final
Mexico (Tompkins)	0	0	0	1	0	0	X	X	X	X	1
Czech Republic (Klíma) 🔨	2	2	1	0	1	4	X	X	X	X	10

Sheet B	1	2	3	4	5	6	7	8	9	10	Final
Japan (Matsumura) 🔨	1	0	1	0	4	1	0	1	4	X	12
Finland (Pöllänen)	0	1	0	1	0	0	3	0	0	X	5

Sheet C	1	2	3	4	5	6	7	8	9	10	Final
Russia (Glukhov)	0	3	1	1	0	3	0	0	3	X	11
Poland (Jasiecki) 🔨	1	0	0	0	3	0	1	1	0	X	6

Sheet D	1	2	3	4	5	6	7	8	9	10	Final
China (Zou)	0	2	0	0	3	0	0	1	0	2	8
England (Reed) 🔨	1	0	1	1	0	2	0	0	2	0	7

==== Draw 7 ====
Friday, January 17, 19:00

Sheet A	1	2	3	4	5	6	7	8	9	10	Final
Poland (Jasiecki)	0	1	1	0	0	0	1	0	X	X	3
Japan (Matsumura) 🔨	1	0	0	2	2	0	0	4	X	X	9

Sheet B	1	2	3	4	5	6	7	8	9	10	Final
Czech Republic (Klíma)	0	2	2	0	0	1	0	0	2	0	7
China (Zou) 🔨	2	0	0	2	1	0	0	2	0	1	8

Sheet C	1	2	3	4	5	6	7	8	9	10	Final
Mexico (Tompkins)	0	1	0	1	0	1	0	0	0	X	3
England (Reed) 🔨	2	0	1	0	1	0	2	2	1	X	9

Sheet D	1	2	3	4	5	6	7	8	9	10	Final
Russia (Glukhov) 🔨	4	0	0	0	1	0	1	1	0	X	7
Finland (Pöllänen)	0	3	1	2	0	2	0	0	4	X	12

=== Playoffs ===
1 vs. 2
1	China	10
2	Russia	5

Second place game
2	Russia	8
3	Japan	7

Qualify for World Championship
China
Russia

==== 1 vs. 2 ====
Saturday, January 18, 09:00

Team	1	2	3	4	5	6	7	8	9	10	Final
China (Zou) 🔨	1	0	2	3	0	0	0	4	X	X	10
Russia (Glukhov)	0	1	0	0	4	0	0	0	X	X	5

Winner qualifies for 2020 World Men's Curling Championship.

Loser drops to second place game.

==== Second place game ====
Saturday, January 18, 14:00

Team	1	2	3	4	5	6	7	8	9	10	Final
Russia (Glukhov) 🔨	0	2	0	0	2	0	0	4	0	0	8
Japan (Matsumura)	0	0	2	0	0	1	0	0	3	1	7

Winner qualifies for 2020 World Men's Curling Championship.

== Women ==
=== Qualification ===
Eight women's teams will qualify to participate in the 2020 World Qualification Event, through the following methods:

Event	Vacancies	Qualified
Host nation	1	Finland
2019 Americas Challenge	1	Mexico
2019 European Curling Championships	4	Estonia; Norway; Italy; Turkey
2019 Pacific-Asia Curling Championships	2	South Korea; ~~Hong Kong~~; ~~Chinese Taipei~~; Australia
TOTAL	8	

Notes

Crossed-out teams qualified for this event on merit, but later withdrew and were replaced by the next highest ranking team.

=== Teams ===
Australia	Estonia	Finland	Italy
Skip: Lauren Wagner; Third: Jennifer Westhagen; Second: Kristen Tsourlenes; Lead: Carlee Millikin	Skip: Marie Turmann; Third: Liisa Turmann; Second: Heili Grossmann; Lead: Erika Tuvike	Skip: Elina Virtaala; Third: Miia Turto; Second: Janina Lindström; Lead: Tuuli Rissanen; Alternate: Marjo Hippi	Skip: Veronica Zappone; Third: Stefania Constantini; Second: Angela Romei; Lead: Giulia Zardini Lacedelli; Alternate: Elena Dami
South Korea	Mexico	Norway	Turkey
Skip: Gim Un-chi; Third: Um Min-ji; Second: Kim Su-ji; Lead: Seol Ye-eun; Alternate: Seol Ye-ji	Skip: Adriana Camarena Osorno; Third: Angélica Pérez Anzures; Second: Estefana Quintero Torres; Lead: Monica Tompkins	Skip: Marianne Rørvik; Third: Eli Skaslien; Second: Pia Trulsen; Lead: Jennifer Cunningham	Skip: Dilşat Yıldız; Third: Öznur Polat; Second: Semiha Konuksever; Lead: Mihriban Polat

=== Round-robin standings ===
Final round-robin standings

Key
Teams to Playoffs

Country	Skip	W	L	W–L	DSC
South Korea	Gim Un-chi	7	0	–	50.14
Italy	Veronica Zappone	6	1	–	76.20
Turkey	Dilşat Yıldız	4	3	1–1	46.91
Estonia	Marie Turmann	4	3	1–1	69.56
Norway	Marianne Rørvik	4	3	1–1	80.21
Finland	Elina Virtaala	2	5	–	93.06
Australia	Lauren Wagner	1	6	–	90.68
Mexico	Adriana Camarena Osorno	0	7	–	104.42

=== Round-robin results ===
All draws are listed in Eastern European Time (UTC+02:00).

==== Draw 1 ====
Monday, January 13, 15:00

Sheet A	1	2	3	4	5	6	7	8	9	10	Final
Italy (Zappone)	0	1	2	0	3	0	0	2	0	X	8
Estonia (Turmann) 🔨	0	0	0	2	0	1	0	0	1	X	4

Sheet B	1	2	3	4	5	6	7	8	9	10	Final
South Korea (Gim)	1	1	0	2	3	0	2	3	X	X	12
Finland (Virtaala) 🔨	0	0	1	0	0	2	0	0	X	X	3

Sheet C	1	2	3	4	5	6	7	8	9	10	Final
Turkey (Yıldız)	0	2	0	1	3	1	3	3	X	X	13
Australia (Wagner) 🔨	3	0	2	0	0	0	0	0	X	X	5

Sheet D	1	2	3	4	5	6	7	8	9	10	Final
Mexico (Camarena Osorno)	0	1	0	1	0	1	0	X	X	X	3
Norway (Rørvik) 🔨	2	0	2	0	5	0	0	X	X	X	9

==== Draw 2 ====
Tuesday, January 14, 09:00

Sheet A	1	2	3	4	5	6	7	8	9	10	Final
Mexico (Camarena Osorno)	0	0	0	1	0	0	0	X	X	X	1
Finland (Virtaala) 🔨	1	3	1	0	2	2	2	X	X	X	11

Sheet B	1	2	3	4	5	6	7	8	9	10	Final
Italy (Zappone) 🔨	1	1	0	2	2	1	0	0	0	X	7
Australia (Wagner)	0	0	1	0	0	0	2	1	1	X	5

Sheet C	1	2	3	4	5	6	7	8	9	10	Final
Estonia (Turmann) 🔨	0	1	1	1	0	2	0	1	0	X	6
Norway (Rørvik)	1	0	0	0	4	0	3	0	1	X	9

Sheet D	1	2	3	4	5	6	7	8	9	10	Final
Turkey (Yıldız)	1	0	1	0	0	0	2	0	2	0	6
South Korea (Gim) 🔨	0	2	0	1	0	2	0	1	0	1	7

==== Draw 3 ====
Tuesday, January 14, 19:00

Sheet A	1	2	3	4	5	6	7	8	9	10	Final
Norway (Rørvik) 🔨	0	1	3	2	0	1	2	2	X	X	11
Australia (Wagner)	1	0	0	0	1	0	0	0	X	X	2

Sheet B	1	2	3	4	5	6	7	8	9	10	Final
Mexico (Camarena Osorno)	0	0	0	1	0	1	0	X	X	X	2
Turkey (Yıldız) 🔨	2	1	1	0	2	0	4	X	X	X	10

Sheet C	1	2	3	4	5	6	7	8	9	10	Final
Italy (Zappone)	0	0	2	0	1	0	1	0	1	X	5
South Korea (Gim) 🔨	2	1	0	2	0	1	0	3	0	X	9

Sheet D	1	2	3	4	5	6	7	8	9	10	Final
Estonia (Turmann) 🔨	3	2	0	0	1	0	1	0	2	X	9
Finland (Virtaala)	0	0	2	0	0	2	0	1	0	X	5

==== Draw 4 ====
Wednesday, January 15, 14:00

Sheet A	1	2	3	4	5	6	7	8	9	10	Final
Turkey (Yıldız) 🔨	1	0	0	0	1	0	X	X	X	X	2
Italy (Zappone)	0	4	4	1	0	2	X	X	X	X	11

Sheet B	1	2	3	4	5	6	7	8	9	10	Final
Finland (Virtaala)	0	0	1	1	0	0	2	0	0	2	6
Norway (Rørvik) 🔨	0	2	0	0	2	1	0	1	1	0	7

Sheet C	1	2	3	4	5	6	7	8	9	10	Final
Mexico (Camarena Osorno)	0	0	1	0	0	0	X	X	X	X	1
Estonia (Turmann) 🔨	2	2	0	0	4	1	X	X	X	X	9

Sheet D	1	2	3	4	5	6	7	8	9	10	Final
South Korea (Gim) 🔨	4	4	0	1	3	1	X	X	X	X	13
Australia (Wagner)	0	0	1	0	0	0	X	X	X	X	1

==== Draw 5 ====
Thursday, January 16, 09:00

Sheet A	1	2	3	4	5	6	7	8	9	10	Final
Estonia (Turmann)	0	0	1	0	1	0	0	0	0	X	2
South Korea (Gim) 🔨	1	1	0	1	0	0	0	1	3	X	7

Sheet B	1	2	3	4	5	6	7	8	9	10	Final
Australia (Wagner)	0	5	1	3	1	0	0	4	X	X	14
Mexico (Camarena Osorno) 🔨	2	0	0	0	0	1	1	0	X	X	4

Sheet C	1	2	3	4	5	6	7	8	9	10	Final
Norway (Rørvik)	0	2	0	1	0	0	0	0	0	X	3
Turkey (Yıldız) 🔨	2	0	1	0	1	1	2	1	1	X	9

Sheet D	1	2	3	4	5	6	7	8	9	10	Final
Finland (Virtaala)	0	2	0	0	2	0	0	0	2	0	6
Italy (Zappone) 🔨	1	0	0	1	0	1	1	3	0	1	8

==== Draw 6 ====
Thursday, January 16, 19:00

Sheet A	1	2	3	4	5	6	7	8	9	10	Final
Finland (Virtaala)	0	1	0	1	0	0	2	0	X	X	4
Turkey (Yıldız) 🔨	2	0	4	0	1	1	0	3	X	X	11

Sheet B	1	2	3	4	5	6	7	8	9	10	Final
Norway (Rørvik)	0	0	2	0	0	1	0	2	0	X	5
Italy (Zappone) 🔨	0	1	0	3	1	0	4	0	1	X	10

Sheet C	1	2	3	4	5	6	7	8	9	10	Final
South Korea (Gim) 🔨	4	1	1	5	0	4	X	X	X	X	15
Mexico (Camarena Osorno)	0	0	0	0	1	0	X	X	X	X	1

Sheet D	1	2	3	4	5	6	7	8	9	10	Final
Australia (Wagner) 🔨	1	0	0	1	0	0	0	0	X	X	2
Estonia (Turmann)	0	1	1	0	2	0	1	4	X	X	9

==== Draw 7 ====
Friday, January 17, 14:00

Sheet A	1	2	3	4	5	6	7	8	9	10	Final
South Korea (Gim)	1	0	2	0	0	0	2	3	0	X	8
Norway (Rørvik) 🔨	0	1	0	1	1	2	0	0	1	X	6

Sheet B	1	2	3	4	5	6	7	8	9	10	Final
Turkey (Yıldız) 🔨	2	0	0	1	0	0	0	1	0	0	4
Estonia (Turmann)	0	0	2	0	1	1	1	0	0	2	7

Sheet C	1	2	3	4	5	6	7	8	9	10	Final
Australia (Wagner)	0	0	0	1	0	0	3	1	0	X	5
Finland (Virtaala) 🔨	0	1	0	0	5	1	0	0	6	X	13

Sheet D	1	2	3	4	5	6	7	8	9	10	Final
Italy (Zappone)	0	4	1	4	0	1	1	X	X	X	11
Mexico (Camarena Osorno) 🔨	1	0	0	0	1	0	0	X	X	X	2

=== Playoffs ===
1 vs. 2
1	South Korea	6
2	Italy	5

Second place game
2	Italy	8
3	Turkey	4

Qualify for World Championship
South Korea
Italy

==== 1 vs. 2 ====
Saturday, January 18, 09:00

Team	1	2	3	4	5	6	7	8	9	10	Final
South Korea (Gim) 🔨	1	0	1	0	0	1	1	1	0	1	6
Italy (Zappone)	0	2	0	1	1	0	0	0	1	0	5

Winner qualifies for 2020 World Women's Curling Championship.

Loser drops to second place game.

==== Second place game ====
Saturday, January 18, 14:00

Team	1	2	3	4	5	6	7	8	9	10	Final
Italy (Zappone) 🔨	1	0	2	0	0	0	1	1	1	2	8
Turkey (Yıldız)	0	0	0	1	2	1	0	0	0	0	4

Winner qualifies for 2020 World Women's Curling Championship.
