= Han Peng (curler) =

Chinese curler

- Curler
- Born: October 13, 1996 (age 30); Jilin, China

Team
- Curling club: Harbin CC, Harbin, CHN
- Skip: Zou Qiang
- Third: Tian Jiafeng
- Second: Wang Zhiyu
- Lead: Xu Jingtao
- Alternate: Han Peng

Curling career
- Member Association: China
- World Championship: 1 (2021)
- Pacific-Asia Championship: 1 (2019)
Medal record
Men's curling
Representing China
Pacific-Asia Curling Championships
Bronze medal – third place	2019 Shenzhen

Han Peng (born October 13, 1996) is a Chinese curler from Changchun, China. He is currently the alternate on the Chinese National Men's Curling Team skipped by Zou Qiang.

== Career ==
Han became the alternate on the Chinese National Men's Curling Team for the 2019–20 season. The team represented China at the 2019 Pacific-Asia Curling Championships, where they won the bronze medal. This qualified them for the 2020 World Qualification Event, which they won, earning them a spot at the 2020 World Men's Curling Championship. They would not, however, get the chance to play in the World Championship as it was cancelled due to the COVID-19 pandemic. As the championship was cancelled, the team represented China the following season at the 2021 World Men's Curling Championship in Calgary, Alberta where they finished in last place with a 2–11 record.

== Personal life ==
Han is a full-time curler.

== Teams ==
Season	Skip	Third	Second	Lead	Alternate
2018–19	Tian Jiafeng	Han Peng	Wang Xiangkun	Zhang Wenxin	
2019–20	Han Peng	Guan Tianqi	Tian Yu	Kong Ziming	
2019–20	Zou Qiang	Wang Zhiyu	Tian Jiafeng	Xu Jingtao	Han Peng
2020–21	Zou Qiang	Tian Jiafeng	Wang Zhiyu	Xu Jingtao	Han Peng
