= Han Peng =

Han Peng may refer to:

- Han Peng (footballer, born 1983), male footballer
- Han Peng (footballer, born 1989), female footballer
- Han Peng (curler)
