= 2018–19 Curling World Cup grand final =

- Host city: Beijing, China
- Dates: May 8–12, 2019
- Women's winner: Canada
- Curling club: St. Vital CC
- Skip: Jennifer Jones
- Third: Kaitlyn Lawes
- Second: Shannon Birchard
- Lead: Jill Officer
- Coach: Nolan Thiessen
- Finalist: Switzerland (Tirinzoni)
- Men's winner: Canada
- Curling club: The Glencoe Club
- Skip: Kevin Koe
- Third: B.J. Neufeld
- Second: Colton Flasch
- Lead: Denni Neufeld
- Coach: Paul Webster
- Finalist: China (Zou)
- Mixed doubles winner: Norway
- Curling club: Oppdal CK
- Female: Kristin Skaslien
- Male: Magnus Nedregotten
- Coach: Thomas Løvold
- Finalist: Canada (Walker/Muyres)

The grand final of the 2018–19 Curling World Cup took place from May 8 to 12, 2019 in Beijing, China.

Canada's Jennifer Jones defeated Switzerland's Silvana Tirinzoni in the women's final. Canada's Kevin Koe defeated China's Zou Qiang in the men's final and Norway's Kristin Skaslien and Magnus Nedregotten defeated Canada's pair of Laura Walker and Kirk Muyres in the mixed doubles final.

== Format ==
Curling World Cup matches have eight ends, rather than the standard ten ends. Ties after eight ends will be decided by a shoot-out, with each team throwing a stone and the one closest to the button winning. A win in eight or fewer ends will earn a team 3 points, a shoot-out win 2 points, a shoot-out loss 1 point, and 0 points for a loss in eight or fewer ends.

Each event will have eight teams in the men's, women's, and mixed doubles tournament. The teams will be split into two groups of four, based on the Curling World Cup rankings, whereby the 1st, 3rd, 5th, and 7th, ranked teams will be in one group and the 2nd, 4th, 6th, and 8th ranked teams in the other. The first place teams in each group will play against each other in the final. In the event of a tie for first place, a shoot-out will be used, with the same format used to decide matches tied after eight ends.

== Qualification ==
The host (China), the winners of each leg, the current world champions, a team specifically invited, and the two highest remaining member associations on the Curling World Cup ranking list will qualify for the grand final. Two separate teams from the same member association may qualify for the grand final.

The following countries qualified for each discipline:

Qualification method	Women	Men	Mixed doubles
Hosting member association	China	China	China
First leg winner	Canada (Homan) (Note: Team Homan is being replaced by a team consisting of Jennifer Jones, Kaitlyn Lawes, Shannon Birchard and Jill Officer due to Homan and her second Joanne Courtney being due to give birth in the summer.)	Canada (Koe)	Canada (Walker/Muyres)
Second leg winner	Japan (Fujisawa)	United States (Shuster)	Norway (Skaslien/Nedregotten)
Third leg winner	South Korea (Kim)	Canada (Dunstone)	Canada (Sahaidak/Lott)
Highest ranked remaining member associations	Sweden	Sweden	Switzerland
Highest ranked remaining member associations	Russia	Scotland	United States
World champions	Switzerland (Tirinzoni)	~~Sweden (Edin)~~ (Note: With Team Edin already qualified for the grand final, Switzerland, the highest-ranked country not yet qualified, was invited.)	Switzerland (Jäggi/Michel) (Note: The 2018 World Mixed Doubles Curling Champions, Michèle Jäggi and Sven Michel, were selected to compete due to the short time between the 2019 championship and the grand final.)
Invited by World Curling Federation (Note: In each discipline, the WCF chose to invite the highest-ranked country not yet qualified.)	United States	Norway	Russia

== Women ==
=== Teams ===
Canada	China	Japan	Russia
Skip: Jennifer Jones; Third: Kaitlyn Lawes; Second: Shannon Birchard; Lead: Jill Officer	Skip: Jiang Yilun; Third: Zhang Lijun; Second: Dong Ziqi; Lead: Jiang Xindi	Skip: Satsuki Fujisawa; Third: Chinami Yoshida; Second: Yumi Suzuki; Lead: Yurika Yoshida	Skip: Anna Sidorova; Third: Margarita Fomina; Second: Julia Portunova; Lead: Julia Guzieva
South Korea	Sweden	Switzerland	United States
Skip: Kim Min-ji; Third: Kim Hye-rin; Second: Yang Tae-i; Lead: Kim Su-jin	Skip: Anna Hasselborg; Third: Sara McManus; Second: Agnes Knochenhauer; Lead: Sofia Mabergs	Fourth: Alina Pätz; Skip: Silvana Tirinzoni; Second: Esther Neuenschwander; Lead: Melanie Barbezat	Skip: Nina Roth; Third: Tabitha Peterson; Second: Aileen Geving; Lead: Becca Hamilton

=== Round-robin standings ===
Group A
Team	W	SOW	SOL	L	Pts
Canada (Jones)	2	2	0	2	10
Japan (Fujisawa)	3	0	1	2	10
China (Jiang)	3	0	0	3	9
United States (Roth)	2	0	1	3	7

Group B
Team	W	SOW	SOL	L	Pts
Switzerland (Tirinzoni)	4	0	1	1	13
Russia (Sidorova)	4	0	0	2	12
Sweden (Hasselborg)	2	0	0	4	6
South Korea (Kim)	1	1	0	4	5

=== Round-robin results ===
==== Draw 1 ====
Wednesday, May 8, 15:00

Sheet A	1	2	3	4	5	6	7	8	Final
Canada (Jones) 🔨	0	3	0	3	2	2	X	X	10
Japan (Fujisawa)	0	0	1	0	0	0	X	X	1

Sheet B	1	2	3	4	5	6	7	8	Final
China (Jiang) 🔨	2	0	0	4	1	0	2	X	9
United States (Roth)	0	1	0	0	0	1	0	X	2

Sheet C	1	2	3	4	5	6	7	8	Final
South Korea (Kim) 🔨	1	0	3	0	0	0	0	1	5
Sweden (Hasselborg)	0	1	0	1	0	1	1	0	4

Sheet D	1	2	3	4	5	6	7	8	Final
Russia (Sidorova) 🔨	2	0	0	2	0	0	0	0	4
Switzerland (Tirinzoni)	0	2	0	0	1	1	1	1	6

==== Draw 4 ====
Thursday, May 9, 08:30

Sheet E	1	2	3	4	5	6	7	8	Final
Canada (Jones) 🔨	0	0	1	1	0	1	1	X	4
China (Jiang)	0	0	0	0	1	0	0	X	1

==== Draw 5 ====
Thursday, May 9, 12:00

Sheet E	1	2	3	4	5	6	7	8	Final
Japan (Fujisawa) 🔨	1	0	1	0	3	1	0	1	7
United States (Roth)	0	1	0	2	0	0	2	0	5

==== Draw 6 ====
Thursday, May 9, 16:00

Sheet A	1	2	3	4	5	6	7	8	Final
South Korea (Kim) 🔨	2	0	0	2	0	1	0	0	5
Russia (Sidorova)	0	1	2	0	2	0	0	2	7

==== Draw 7 ====
Thursday, May 9, 19:30

Sheet A	1	2	3	4	5	6	7	8	Final
Sweden (Hasselborg) 🔨	1	0	0	0	0	1	0	X	2
Switzerland (Tirinzoni)	0	1	0	0	1	0	4	X	6

==== Draw 8 ====
Friday, May 10, 08:30

Sheet C	1	2	3	4	5	6	7	8	Final
China (Jiang) 🔨	1	1	0	1	0	2	0	0	5
Japan (Fujisawa)	0	0	2	0	3	0	0	1	6

Sheet D	1	2	3	4	5	6	7	8	9	Final
United States (Roth) 🔨	2	0	0	1	2	0	0	2	0	7
Canada (Jones)	0	2	1	0	0	2	2	0	1	8

==== Draw 9 ====
Friday, May 10, 12:00

Sheet B	1	2	3	4	5	6	7	8	Final
Russia (Sidorova) 🔨	2	2	0	2	0	2	0	X	8
Sweden (Hasselborg)	0	0	1	0	3	0	1	X	5

Sheet C	1	2	3	4	5	6	7	8	Final
Switzerland (Tirinzoni) 🔨	1	0	0	2	1	3	1	X	8
South Korea (Kim)	0	3	1	0	0	0	0	X	4

==== Draw 10 ====
Friday, May 10, 16:00

Sheet A	1	2	3	4	5	6	7	8	9	Final
Japan (Fujisawa) 🔨	0	1	1	0	2	0	2	0	0	6
Canada (Jones)	1	0	0	2	0	1	0	2	1	7

Sheet B	1	2	3	4	5	6	7	8	Final
United States (Roth) 🔨	1	0	1	0	0	1	0	X	3
China (Jiang)	0	1	0	2	1	0	3	X	7

==== Draw 11 ====
Friday, May 10, 19:30

Sheet B	1	2	3	4	5	6	7	8	Final
Switzerland (Tirinzoni) 🔨	1	0	0	2	0	1	3	0	7
Russia (Sidorova)	0	2	0	0	1	0	0	2	5

Sheet D	1	2	3	4	5	6	7	8	Final
Sweden (Hasselborg) 🔨	0	5	0	1	1	0	1	X	8
South Korea (Kim)	0	0	2	0	0	2	0	X	4

==== Draw 12 ====
Saturday, May 11, 08:30

Sheet E	1	2	3	4	5	6	7	8	Final
China (Jiang) 🔨	2	0	2	1	0	2	0	X	7
Canada (Jones)	0	1	0	0	2	0	1	X	4

==== Draw 13 ====
Saturday, May 11, 12:00

Sheet A	1	2	3	4	5	6	7	8	Final
Russia (Sidorova) 🔨	4	0	0	1	1	1	0	1	8
South Korea (Kim)	0	2	2	0	0	0	2	0	6

Sheet D	1	2	3	4	5	6	7	8	Final
Switzerland (Tirinzoni) 🔨	1	0	0	3	0	0	1	0	5
Sweden (Hasselborg)	0	3	0	0	0	3	0	1	7

Sheet E	1	2	3	4	5	6	7	8	Final
United States (Roth) 🔨	2	0	3	0	3	0	1	X	9
Japan (Fujisawa)	0	1	0	1	0	2	0	X	4

==== Draw 15 ====
Saturday, May 11, 19:30

Sheet B	1	2	3	4	5	6	7	8	9	Final
South Korea (Kim) 🔨	1	0	1	1	0	0	3	0	1	7
Switzerland (Tirinzoni)	0	2	0	0	0	2	0	2	0	6

Sheet C	1	2	3	4	5	6	7	8	Final
Canada (Jones) 🔨	2	2	0	0	1	0	0	0	5
United States (Roth)	0	0	1	2	0	1	1	1	6

Sheet D	1	2	3	4	5	6	7	8	Final
Japan (Fujisawa) 🔨	0	2	3	0	1	0	1	X	7
China (Jiang)	0	0	0	1	0	1	0	X	2

Sheet E	1	2	3	4	5	6	7	8	Final
Sweden (Hasselborg) 🔨	1	0	0	0	2	0	0	X	3
Russia (Sidorova)	0	1	2	1	0	2	2	X	8

=== Final ===
Sunday, May 12, 16:00

Sheet C	1	2	3	4	5	6	7	8	Final
Canada (Jones)	1	2	0	1	1	0	2	2	9
Switzerland (Tirinzoni) 🔨	0	0	3	0	0	3	0	0	6

== Men ==
=== Teams ===
Canada	Canada	China	Norway
Skip: Matt Dunstone; Third: Braeden Moskowy; Second: Catlin Schneider; Lead: Dustin Kidby	Skip: Kevin Koe; Third: B.J. Neufeld; Second: Colton Flasch; Lead: Denni Neufeld	Fourth: Ba Dexin; Skip: Zou Qiang; Second: Wang Zhiyu; Lead: Xu Jingtao	Skip: Thomas Ulsrud; Third: Torger Nergård; Second: Christoffer Svae; Lead: Håvard Vad Petersson
Scotland	Sweden	Switzerland	United States
Skip: Ross Paterson; Third: Duncan Menzies; Second: Kyle Waddell; Lead: Michael Goodfellow	Skip: Niklas Edin; Third: Oskar Eriksson; Second: Rasmus Wranå; Lead: Christoffer Sundgren	Skip: Yannick Schwaller; Third: Michael Brunner; Second: Romano Meier; Lead: Marcel Kaeufeler	Skip: John Shuster; Third: Chris Plys; Second: Matt Hamilton; Lead: John Landsteiner

=== Round-robin standings ===
Group A
Team	W	SOW	SOL	L	Pts
China (Zou)	4	0	0	2	12
Sweden (Edin)	3	0	0	3	9
United States (Shuster)	2	1	0	3	8
Canada (Dunstone)	2	0	1	3	7

Group B
Team	W	SOW	SOL	L	Pts
Canada (Koe)	4	0	0	2	12
Scotland (Paterson)	4	0	0	2	12
Switzerland (Schwaller)	3	0	0	3	9
Norway (Ulsrud)	1	0	0	5	3

=== Round-robin results ===
==== Draw 3 ====
Wednesday, May 8, 21:00

Sheet A	1	2	3	4	5	6	7	8	9	Final
United States (Shuster) 🔨	2	0	2	1	0	0	1	0	1	7
Canada (Dunstone)	0	1	0	0	1	3	0	1	0	6

Sheet B	1	2	3	4	5	6	7	8	Final
China (Zou) 🔨	2	0	1	0	0	2	0	2	7
Sweden (Edin)	0	2	0	1	2	0	1	0	6

Sheet C	1	2	3	4	5	6	7	8	Final
Norway (Ulsrud) 🔨	1	0	0	3	1	0	0	0	5
Scotland (Paterson)	0	3	2	0	0	2	0	2	9

Sheet D	1	2	3	4	5	6	7	8	Final
Canada (Koe) 🔨	1	0	1	0	0	0	0	0	2
Switzerland (Schwaller)	0	2	0	1	0	1	0	2	6

==== Draw 5 ====
Thursday, May 9, 12:00

Sheet A	1	2	3	4	5	6	7	8	Final
Norway (Ulsrud) 🔨	1	0	0	2	0	0	1	0	4
Canada (Koe)	0	1	1	0	0	2	0	1	5

Sheet B	1	2	3	4	5	6	7	8	Final
Scotland (Paterson) 🔨	3	1	1	0	1	0	X	X	6
Switzerland (Schwaller)	0	0	0	1	0	1	X	X	2

Sheet C	1	2	3	4	5	6	7	8	Final
United States (Shuster) 🔨	1	0	1	0	2	0	3	X	7
China (Zou)	0	1	0	1	0	1	0	X	3

Sheet D	1	2	3	4	5	6	7	8	Final
Canada (Dunstone) 🔨	0	1	0	0	2	0	1	0	4
Sweden (Edin)	0	0	0	2	0	1	0	2	5

==== Draw 7 ====
Thursday, May 9, 19:30

Sheet B	1	2	3	4	5	6	7	8	Final
China (Zou) 🔨	2	0	3	0	0	1	0	1	7
Canada (Dunstone)	0	2	0	0	1	0	2	0	5

Sheet C	1	2	3	4	5	6	7	8	Final
Canada (Koe) 🔨	3	3	0	2	1	0	X	X	9
Scotland (Paterson)	0	0	2	0	0	0	X	X	2

Sheet D	1	2	3	4	5	6	7	8	Final
Switzerland (Schwaller) 🔨	1	4	0	2	0	1	X	X	8
Norway (Ulsrud)	0	0	1	0	1	0	X	X	2

Sheet E	1	2	3	4	5	6	7	8	Final
Sweden (Edin) 🔨	1	0	0	0	2	2	0	X	5
United States (Shuster)	0	0	0	1	0	0	1	X	2

==== Draw 9 ====
Friday, May 10, 12:00

Sheet A	1	2	3	4	5	6	7	8	Final
Canada (Dunstone) 🔨	0	0	3	1	0	0	1	X	5
United States (Shuster)	0	1	0	0	0	1	0	X	2

Sheet D	1	2	3	4	5	6	7	8	Final
Sweden (Edin) 🔨	1	0	1	1	1	1	X	X	5
China (Zou)	0	0	0	0	0	0	X	X	0

==== Draw 10 ====
Friday, May 10, 16:00

Sheet C	1	2	3	4	5	6	7	8	Final
Scotland (Paterson) 🔨	0	3	0	2	0	1	0	0	6
Norway (Ulsrud)	0	0	2	0	1	0	1	1	5

Sheet E	1	2	3	4	5	6	7	8	Final
Switzerland (Schwaller) 🔨	4	0	2	2	1	0	X	X	9
Canada (Koe)	0	2	0	0	0	1	X	X	3

==== Draw 12 ====
Saturday, May 11, 08:30

Sheet A	1	2	3	4	5	6	7	8	Final
Sweden (Edin) 🔨	0	1	0	1	0	1	0	0	3
Canada (Dunstone)	0	0	2	0	1	0	0	1	4

Sheet B	1	2	3	4	5	6	7	8	Final
Canada (Koe) 🔨	0	1	0	0	1	0	2	0	4
Norway (Ulsrud)	0	0	1	0	0	1	0	1	3

Sheet C	1	2	3	4	5	6	7	8	Final
China (Zou) 🔨	1	0	0	1	0	2	1	1	6
United States (Shuster)	0	1	1	0	1	0	0	0	3

Sheet D	1	2	3	4	5	6	7	8	Final
Switzerland (Schwaller) 🔨	0	2	0	0	0	0	X	X	2
Scotland (Paterson)	1	0	2	1	1	2	X	X	7

==== Draw 14 ====
Saturday, May 11, 16:00

Sheet B	1	2	3	4	5	6	7	8	Final
United States (Shuster) 🔨	0	2	0	0	2	1	0	1	6
Sweden (Edin)	1	0	1	1	0	0	1	0	4

Sheet C	1	2	3	4	5	6	7	8	Final
Norway (Ulsrud) 🔨	2	3	2	0	1	0	X	X	8
Switzerland (Schwaller)	0	0	0	1	0	1	X	X	2

Sheet D	1	2	3	4	5	6	7	8	Final
Scotland (Paterson) 🔨	0	2	0	1	0	2	1	0	6
Canada (Koe)	3	0	2	0	2	0	0	0	7

Sheet E	1	2	3	4	5	6	7	8	Final
Canada (Dunstone) 🔨	0	0	2	0	1	0	0	0	3
China (Zou)	0	0	0	1	0	2	0	1	4

=== Final ===
Sunday, May 12, 09:00

Sheet C	1	2	3	4	5	6	7	8	Final
China (Zou) 🔨	1	0	0	1	0	0	1	0	3
Canada (Koe)	0	1	1	0	1	1	0	1	5

== Mixed doubles ==
=== Teams ===
Canada	Canada	China	Norway
Female: Kadriana Sahaidak; Male: Colton Lott	Female: Laura Walker; Male: Kirk Muyres	Female: Cao Chang; Male: Yuan Mingjie	Female: Kristin Skaslien; Male: Magnus Nedregotten
Russia	Switzerland	Switzerland	United States
Female: Maria Komarova; Male: Daniil Goriachev	Female: Michèle Jäggi; Male: Sven Michel	Female: Jenny Perret; Male: Martin Rios	Female: Sarah Anderson; Male: Korey Dropkin

=== Round-robin standings ===
Group A
Team	W	SOW	SOL	L	Pts
Canada (Walker/Muyres)	4	1	0	1	14
United States (Anderson/Dropkin)	4	0	0	2	12
Switzerland (Jäggi/Michel)	2	0	1	3	7
China (Cao/Yuan)	1	0	0	5	3

Group B
Team	W	SOW	SOL	L	Pts
Norway (Skaslien/Nedregotten)	5	0	1	0	16
Canada (Sahaidak/Lott)	3	1	0	2	11
Switzerland (Perret/Rios)	2	0	1	3	7
Russia (Komarova/Goriachev)	0	1	0	5	2

=== Round-robin results ===
==== Draw 2 ====
Wednesday, May 8, 18:30

Sheet A	1	2	3	4	5	6	7	8	Final
Canada (Walker/Muyres) 🔨	2	1	0	0	2	0	2	X	7
China (Cao/Yuan)	0	0	1	1	0	1	0	X	3

Sheet B	1	2	3	4	5	6	7	8	Final
United States (Anderson/Dropkin) 🔨	3	0	1	0	1	1	0	2	8
Switzerland (Jäggi/Michel)	0	1	0	3	0	0	1	0	5

Sheet C	1	2	3	4	5	6	7	8	Final
Canada (Sahaidak/Lott) 🔨	1	0	2	0	0	1	1	0	5
Norway (Skaslien/Nedregotten)	0	1	0	3	1	0	0	1	6

Sheet D	1	2	3	4	5	6	7	8	9	Final
Switzerland (Perret/Rios) 🔨	1	0	1	1	2	0	2	0	0	7
Russia (Komarova/Goriachev)	0	1	0	0	0	4	0	2	1	8

==== Draw 4 ====
Thursday, May 9, 08:30

Sheet A	1	2	3	4	5	6	7	8	Final
Canada (Sahaidak/Lott) 🔨	0	1	0	0	2	1	0	X	4
Switzerland (Perret/Rios)	1	0	4	1	0	0	4	X	10

Sheet B	1	2	3	4	5	6	7	8	Final
Norway (Skaslien/Nedregotten) 🔨	3	3	0	2	0	2	X	X	10
Russia (Komarova/Goriachev)	0	0	1	0	2	0	X	X	3

Sheet C	1	2	3	4	5	6	7	8	Final
Canada (Walker/Muyres) 🔨	0	2	0	3	0	0	2	0	7
United States (Anderson/Dropkin)	2	0	2	0	1	2	0	1	8

Sheet D	1	2	3	4	5	6	7	8	Final
China (Cao/Yuan) 🔨	0	0	4	0	0	3	2	0	9
Switzerland (Jäggi/Michel)	1	1	0	2	2	0	0	1	7

==== Draw 6 ====
Thursday, May 9, 16:00

Sheet B	1	2	3	4	5	6	7	8	Final
Russia (Komarova/Goriachev) 🔨	1	0	1	0	3	0	0	0	5
Canada (Sahaidak/Lott)	0	1	0	2	0	1	1	1	6

Sheet C	1	2	3	4	5	6	7	8	Final
United States (Anderson/Dropkin) 🔨	4	0	2	0	5	2	X	X	13
China (Cao/Yuan)	0	1	0	3	0	0	X	X	4

Sheet D	1	2	3	4	5	6	7	8	9	Final
Switzerland (Jäggi/Michel) 🔨	2	0	1	0	1	0	0	1	0	5
Canada (Walker/Muyres)	0	2	0	1	0	1	1	0	1	6

Sheet E	1	2	3	4	5	6	7	8	Final
Switzerland (Perret/Rios) 🔨	1	1	0	1	0	0	0	3	6
Norway (Skaslien/Nedregotten)	0	0	1	0	3	1	2	0	7

==== Draw 8 ====
Friday, May 10, 08:30

Sheet A	1	2	3	4	5	6	7	8	Final
China (Cao/Yuan) 🔨	1	1	0	0	0	0	0	X	2
Canada (Walker/Muyres)	0	0	1	2	2	3	1	X	9

Sheet B	1	2	3	4	5	6	7	8	Final
Switzerland (Jäggi/Michel) 🔨	0	0	2	0	4	3	1	0	10
United States (Anderson/Dropkin)	1	1	0	3	0	0	0	3	8

Sheet E	1	2	3	4	5	6	7	8	Final
Russia (Komarova/Goriachev) 🔨	2	0	0	2	0	2	0	2	8
Switzerland (Perret/Rios)	0	4	1	0	2	0	2	0	9

==== Draw 9 ====
Friday, May 10, 12:00

Sheet E	1	2	3	4	5	6	7	8	9	Final
Norway (Skaslien/Nedregotten) 🔨	3	0	0	1	1	0	2	0	0	7
Canada (Sahaidak/Lott)	0	3	1	0	0	2	0	1	1	8

==== Draw 10 ====
Friday, May 10, 16:00

Sheet D	1	2	3	4	5	6	7	8	Final
United States (Anderson/Dropkin) 🔨	1	0	3	0	1	0	3	0	8
Canada (Walker/Muyres)	0	3	0	4	0	1	0	1	9

==== Draw 11 ====
Friday, May 10, 19:30

Sheet A	1	2	3	4	5	6	7	8	Final
Russia (Komarova/Goriachev) 🔨	0	0	0	0	0	1	X	X	1
Norway (Skaslien/Nedregotten)	1	2	1	2	1	0	X	X	7

Sheet C	1	2	3	4	5	6	7	8	Final
Switzerland (Perret/Rios) 🔨	0	0	0	0	2	0	1	X	3
Canada (Sahaidak/Lott)	1	1	1	1	0	1	0	X	5

Sheet E	1	2	3	4	5	6	7	8	Final
Switzerland (Jäggi/Michel) 🔨	2	4	2	0	1	1	X	X	10
China (Cao/Yuan)	0	0	0	1	0	0	X	X	1

==== Draw 13 ====
Saturday, May 11, 12:00

Sheet B	1	2	3	4	5	6	7	8	Final
Canada (Walker/Muyres) 🔨	2	0	2	1	1	0	3	X	9
Switzerland (Jäggi/Michel)	0	2	0	0	0	2	0	X	4

Sheet C	1	2	3	4	5	6	7	8	Final
China (Cao/Yuan) 🔨	1	0	1	0	1	1	0	1	5
United States (Anderson/Dropkin)	0	3	0	2	0	0	2	0	7

==== Draw 14 ====
Saturday, May 11, 16:00

Sheet A	1	2	3	4	5	6	7	8	Final
Canada (Sahaidak/Lott) 🔨	0	2	0	1	1	0	2	1	7
Russia (Komarova/Goriachev)	2	0	1	0	0	3	0	0	6

==== Draw 15 ====
Saturday, May 11, 19:30

Sheet A	1	2	3	4	5	6	7	8	Final
Norway (Skaslien/Nedregotten) 🔨	0	0	1	2	1	2	0	2	8
Switzerland (Perret/Rios)	2	2	0	0	0	0	1	0	5

=== Final ===
Sunday, May 12, 13:00

Sheet C	1	2	3	4	5	6	7	8	Final
Canada (Walker/Muyres)	1	0	0	1	0	1	0	X	3
Norway (Skaslien/Nedregotten) 🔨	0	3	1	0	2	0	2	X	8
