= Ma Xiuyue =

Chinese curler

Ma Xiuyue 马秀玥
- Curler
- Born: May 21, 1991 (age 35); Harbin, China

Team
- Curling club: Harbin CC, Harbin, CHN
- Skip: Ma Xiuyue
- Third: Zou Qiang
- Second: Wang Zhiyu
- Lead: Tian Jiafeng
- Alternate: Li Zhichao
- Mixed doubles partner: Dong Ziqi

Curling career
- Member Association: China
- Pacific-Asia Championship: 1 (2015)
- Pan Continental Championship: 1 (2023)
- Olympic: 1 (2022)
Medal record
Men's curling
Representing China
Pacific-Asia Championships
Bronze medal – third place	2015 Almaty

Ma Xiuyue (Chinese: 马秀玥; pinyin: Mǎ Xiùyuè; born May 21, 1991) is a Chinese curler from Harbin. He currently skips the Chinese men's curling team. He won a bronze medal at the 2015 Pacific-Asia Curling Championships and represented China at the 2022 Winter Olympics, skipping the men's curling team.

== Career ==
Ma represented China twice at the World Junior Curling Championships in 2011 and 2012. On both occasions, his team finished with a 4–5 record. Also in 2011 and 2012, Ma won back-to-back Pacific-Asia Junior Curling Championships.

Ma skipped the Chinese team at the 2013 Winter Universiade. Representing the Harbin Institute of Physical Education, his team finished in ninth with a 2–7 record.

In 2015, Ma was the alternate on the Chinese team skipped by Zang Jialiang at the 2015 Pacific-Asia Curling Championships. The team finished the round robin in second place with a 6–1 record before dropping their semifinal match to South Korea's Kim Soo-hyuk. They rebounded against New Zealand's Peter de Boer to claim the bronze medal. Ma next represented China internationally at the third leg of the Curling World Cup event. There, he skipped his team of Ling Zhi, Cheng Kuo and Wang Jingyuan to a 1–5 record.

After taking a few seasons off, Ma returned to curling when he was appointed as skip of the Chinese men's team for the 2022 Winter Olympics, held in Beijing. His team consisted of Zou Qiang, Wang Zhiyu, Xu Jingtao and Jiang Dongxu. Despite not playing a single international competition before the Games, the team fared quite well, finishing the round robin with a 4–5 record. This included defeating higher-seeded teams such as Switzerland's Peter de Cruz, Norway's Steffen Walstad, and Italy's Joël Retornaz. Ultimately, they finished in a four-way tie for fifth place; however, their head to head wins over Switzerland and Norway placed them alone in fifth place at the end of the competition.

== Teams ==
Season	Skip	Third	Second	Lead	Alternate
2010–11	Huang Jihui	Ma Yongjun	Wang Linbo	Ma Xiuyue	Zhang Rongrui
2011–12	Ma Xiuyue	Xiao Shicheng	Jiang Dongxu	Shao Zhilin	Zhang Zhongbao
2012–13	Ma Xiuyue	Ma Yanlong	Xiao Shicheng	Wang Jinbo	Pan Jiaqi
2016–17	Ma Xiuyue	Wang Jinbo	Wang Jingyuan	Zhang Tianyu	Shao Zhilin
2017–18	Ma Xiuyue	Ma Yanlong	Wang Jinbo	Wang Jingyuan	
2018–19	Ma Xiuyue	Jiang Dongxu	Ling Zhi	Wang Jingyuan	
2021–22	Ma Xiuyue	Zou Qiang	Wang Zhiyu	Xu Jingtao	Jiang Dongxu
2022–23	Ma Xiuyue	Cheng Kuo	Yuan Mingjie	Nan Jiawen	
2023–24	Ma Xiuyue	Zou Qiang	Wang Zhiyu	Tian Jiafeng	
