= Jiang Dongxu =

Chinese curler (born 1993)

Jiang Dongxu 姜东旭
- Curler
- Born: March 3, 1993 (age 33); Harbin, China

Team
- Curling club: Harbin CC, Harbin, CHN

Curling career
- Member Association: China
- Pacific-Asia Championship: 1 (2018)
- Olympic: 1 (2022)
Medal record
Men's curling
Representing China
Pacific-Asia Championships
Silver medal – second place	2018 Gangneung

Jiang Dongxu (Chinese: 姜东旭; pinyin: Jiāng Dōngxù; born March 3, 1993) is a Chinese curler from Harbin. He represented China at the 2022 Winter Olympics as the alternate on the Chinese men's team skipped by Ma Xiuyue. He also won a silver medal at the 2018 Pacific-Asia Curling Championships.

== Career ==
Jiang represented China twice at the World Junior Curling Championships in 2012 and 2013. His team finished 4–5 at the 2012 World Junior Curling Championships and 1–8 at the 2013 World Junior Curling Championships. Also during his junior career, Jiang won the 2012 Pacific-Asia Junior Curling Championships playing second for Ma Xiuyue.

Jiang's most successful season was the 2017–18 season when he played second for Team Liu Riu. The team won two tour events, the Direct Horizontal Drilling Fall Classic and the Challenge de Curling de Gatineau. They also played in three Grand Slam of Curling events, reaching the quarterfinals of the 2017 GSOC Tour Challenge Tier 2. At the Olympic Qualification Event, the team was unable to qualify for the 2018 Winter Olympics, posting a 4–3 record.

As alternate for the Zou Qiang rink, Jiang represented China at the 2018 Pacific-Asia Curling Championships. There, the Chinese rink posted an 8–0 round robin record and won their semifinal 9–6 over South Korea's Kim Soo-hyuk. In the final, the team came up short, losing to Japan's Yuta Matsumura 9–7. The following month, Team Zou posted a 3–3 record at the second leg of the Curling World Cup event.

After taking a few seasons off, Jiang was selected to be the alternate on the Chinese men's team for the 2022 Winter Olympics, held in Beijing. The team also included skip Ma Xiuyue, Zou Qiang, Wang Zhiyu and Xu Jingtao. Despite not playing a single international competition before the Games, the team fared quite well, finishing the round robin with a 4–5 record. This included defeating higher-seeded teams such as Switzerland's Peter de Cruz, Norway's Steffen Walstad, and Italy's Joël Retornaz. Ultimately, they finished in a four-way tie for fifth place; however, their head to head wins over Switzerland and Norway placed them alone in fifth place at the end of the competition.

== Teams ==
Season	Skip	Third	Second	Lead	Alternate
2011–12	Ma Xiuyue	Xiao Shicheng	Jiang Dongxu	Shao Zhilin	Zhang Zhongbao
2012–13	Zhang Zhongbao	Jiang Dongxu	Xu Jingtao	Wang Jinbo	Zhang Rongrui
2012–13	Wang Fengchun	Jiang Dongxu	Chen Han	Wang Zhiqiang	
2016–17	Liu Rui	Xu Xiaoming	Jiang Dongxu	Zang Jialiang	
2017–18	Liu Rui	Xu Xiamoing	Jiang Dongxu	Zang Jialiang	
2018–19	Ma Xiuyue	Jiang Dongxu	Ling Zhi	Wang Jingyuan	
2021–22	Ma Xiuyue	Zou Qiang	Wang Zhiyu	Xu Jingtao	Jiang Dongxu
