= Curling at the 2022 Winter Olympics – Men's tournament =

Men's curling at the XXIV Olympic Winter Games
- Venue: Beijing National Aquatics Center
- Dates: 9–19 February
- Competitors: 50 from 10 nations

Medalists
| 1st place, gold medalist(s) | | Niklas Edin; Oskar Eriksson; Rasmus Wranå; Christoffer Sundgren; Daniel Magnusson | Sweden |
| 2nd place, silver medalist(s) | | Bruce Mouat; Grant Hardie; Bobby Lammie; Hammy McMillan Jr.; Ross Whyte | Great Britain |
| 3rd place, bronze medalist(s) | | Brad Gushue; Mark Nichols; Brett Gallant; Geoff Walker; Marc Kennedy | Canada |

The men's curling tournament of the 2022 Winter Olympics was held at the Beijing National Aquatics Center from 9 to 19 February 2022. Ten nations competed in a round robin preliminary round, and the top four nations at the conclusion of the round robin qualified for the medal round. Sweden defeated Great Britain in the final to claim the gold medal. Canada won the bronze medal play-off against the United States.

== Competition schedule ==
| RR | Round robin | SF | Semifinals | B | 3rd place play-off | F | Final |

| Wed 9 | Thu 10 | Fri 11 | Sat 12 | Sun 13 | Mon 14 | Tue 15 | Wed 16 | Thu 17 | | Fri 18 | Sat 19 |
|---|---|---|---|---|---|---|---|---|---|---|---|
| RR | RR | RR | RR | RR | RR | RR | RR | RR | SF | B | F |

== Qualification ==
The top six nations at the 2021 World Men's Curling Championship qualified along with hosts China. The final three teams qualified through the 2021 Olympic Qualification Event.

| Means of qualification | Dates | Location | Quotas | Qualified |
|---|---|---|---|---|
| Host nation | —N/a | | 1 | China |
| 2021 World Men's Curling Championship | 2–11 April 2021 | Calgary, Canada | 6 | Sweden; Great Britain; Switzerland; ROC; Canada; United States |
| Olympic Qualification Event | 11–18 December 2021 | Leeuwarden, Netherlands | 3 | Norway; Italy; Denmark |
| Total | | | 10 | |

== Teams ==
The teams are listed as follows:

| Canada | China | Denmark | Great Britain | Italy |
|---|---|---|---|---|
| St. John's CC, St. John's: Skip: Brad Gushue; Third: Mark Nichols; Second: Brett Gallant; Lead: Geoff Walker; Alternate: Marc Kennedy | Harbin CC, Harbin: Skip: Ma Xiuyue; Third: Zou Qiang; Second: Wang Zhiyu; Lead: Xu Jingtao; Alternate: Jiang Dongxu | Hvidovre CC, Hvidovre: Skip: Mikkel Krause; Third: Mads Nørgård; Second: Henrik Holtermann; Lead: Kasper Wiksten; Alternate: Tobias Thune | Gogar Park CC, Edinburgh: Skip: Bruce Mouat; Third: Grant Hardie; Second: Bobby Lammie; Lead: Hammy McMillan Jr.; Alternate: Ross Whyte | Trentino CC, Cembra: Skip: Joël Retornaz; Third: Amos Mosaner; Second: Sebastiano Arman; Lead: Simone Gonin; Alternate: Mattia Giovanella |
| Norway | ROC | Sweden | Switzerland | United States |
| Oppdal CK, Oppdal: Skip: Steffen Walstad; Third: Torger Nergård; Second: Markus Høiberg; Lead: Magnus Vågberg; Alternate: Magnus Nedregotten | Ice Cube CC, Sochi: Skip: Sergey Glukhov; Third: Evgeny Klimov; Second: Dmitry Mironov; Lead: Anton Kalalb; Alternate: Daniil Goriachev | Karlstad CK, Karlstad: Skip: Niklas Edin; Third: Oskar Eriksson; Second: Rasmus Wranå; Lead: Christoffer Sundgren; Alternate: Daniel Magnusson | Geneva CC, Geneva: Fourth: Benoît Schwarz; Third: Sven Michel; Skip: Peter de Cruz; Lead: Valentin Tanner; Alternate: Pablo Lachat | Duluth CC, Duluth: Skip: John Shuster; Third: Chris Plys; Second: Matt Hamilton; Lead: John Landsteiner; Alternate: Colin Hufman |

== Round-robin standings ==
Final Round Robin Standings
| Team | Skip | Pld | W | L | W–L | PF | PA | EW | EL | BE | SE | S% | DSC | Qualification |
|---|---|---|---|---|---|---|---|---|---|---|---|---|---|---|
| Great Britain | Bruce Mouat | 9 | 8 | 1 | – | 63 | 44 | 39 | 31 | 5 | 10 | 88.0% | 18.81 | Playoffs |
| Sweden | Niklas Edin | 9 | 7 | 2 | – | 64 | 44 | 43 | 30 | 10 | 11 | 85.7% | 14.02 | Playoffs |
| Canada | Brad Gushue | 9 | 5 | 4 | 1–0 | 58 | 50 | 34 | 38 | 7 | 7 | 84.4% | 26.49 | Playoffs |
| United States | John Shuster | 9 | 5 | 4 | 0–1 | 56 | 61 | 35 | 41 | 4 | 5 | 83.0% | 32.29 | Playoffs |
| China | Ma Xiuyue | 9 | 4 | 5 | 2–1; 1–0 | 59 | 62 | 39 | 36 | 6 | 4 | 85.4% | 23.55 | |
| Norway | Steffen Walstad | 9 | 4 | 5 | 2–1; 0–1 | 58 | 53 | 40 | 36 | 0 | 11 | 84.4% | 20.96 | |
| Switzerland | Peter de Cruz | 9 | 4 | 5 | 1–2; 1–0 | 51 | 54 | 33 | 38 | 13 | 3 | 84.5% | 15.74 | |
| ROC | Sergey Glukhov | 9 | 4 | 5 | 1–2; 0–1 | 58 | 58 | 33 | 38 | 6 | 6 | 81.2% | 33.72 | |
| Italy | Joël Retornaz | 9 | 3 | 6 | – | 59 | 65 | 36 | 35 | 3 | 8 | 81.7% | 30.76 | |
| Denmark | Mikkel Krause | 9 | 1 | 8 | – | 36 | 71 | 30 | 39 | 3 | 2 | 78.1% | 32.84 | |

Men's Round Robin Summary Table
| Pos | Team | W | L | GBR | SWE | CAN | USA | CHN | NOR | SUI | ROC | ITA | DEN |
|---|---|---|---|---|---|---|---|---|---|---|---|---|---|
| 1 | Great Britain | 8 | 1 | — | 7–6 | 5–2 | 7–9 | 7–6 | 8–3 | 6–5 | 8–6 | 7–5 | 8–2 |
| 2 | Sweden | 7 | 2 | 6–7 | — | 7–4 | 7–4 | 6–4 | 6–4 | 8–10 | 7–5 | 9–3 | 8–3 |
| 3 | Canada | 5 | 4 | 2–5 | 4–7 | — | 10–5 | 10–8 | 6–5 | 3–5 | 6–7 | 7–3 | 10–5 |
| 4 | United States | 5 | 4 | 9–7 | 4–7 | 5–10 | — | 8–6 | 6–7 | 7–4 | 6–5 | 4–10 | 7–5 |
| 5 | China | 4 | 5 | 6–7 | 4–6 | 8–10 | 6–8 | — | 8–6 | 6–5 | 4–7 | 12–9 | 5–4 |
| 6 | Norway | 4 | 5 | 3–8 | 4–6 | 5–6 | 7–6 | 6–8 | — | 7–4 | 12–5 | 9–4 | 5–6 |
| 7 | Switzerland | 4 | 5 | 5–6 | 10–8 | 5–3 | 4–7 | 5–6 | 4–7 | — | 6–3 | 4–8 | 8–6 |
| 8 | ROC | 4 | 5 | 6–8 | 5–7 | 7–6 | 5–6 | 7–4 | 5–12 | 3–6 | — | 10–7 | 10–2 |
| 9 | Italy | 3 | 6 | 5–7 | 3–9 | 3–7 | 10–4 | 9–12 | 4–9 | 8–4 | 7–10 | — | 10–3 |
| 10 | Denmark | 1 | 8 | 2–8 | 3–8 | 5–10 | 5–7 | 4–5 | 6–5 | 6–8 | 2–10 | 3–10 | — |

== Round-robin results ==
All draw times are listed in China Standard Time (UTC+08:00).

=== Draw 1 ===
Wednesday, 9 February, 20:05

| Sheet A | 1 | 2 | 3 | 4 | 5 | 6 | 7 | 8 | 9 | 10 | Final |
|---|---|---|---|---|---|---|---|---|---|---|---|
| Denmark (Krause) 🔨 | 0 | 2 | 0 | 2 | 0 | 0 | 1 | 0 | X | X | 5 |
| Canada (Gushue) | 1 | 0 | 3 | 0 | 1 | 2 | 0 | 3 | X | X | 10 |

| Sheet B | 1 | 2 | 3 | 4 | 5 | 6 | 7 | 8 | 9 | 10 | 11 | Final |
|---|---|---|---|---|---|---|---|---|---|---|---|---|
| United States (Shuster) 🔨 | 1 | 0 | 0 | 0 | 1 | 1 | 0 | 2 | 0 | 0 | 1 | 6 |
| ROC (Glukhov) | 0 | 0 | 1 | 2 | 0 | 0 | 1 | 0 | 0 | 1 | 0 | 5 |

| Sheet C | 1 | 2 | 3 | 4 | 5 | 6 | 7 | 8 | 9 | 10 | Final |
|---|---|---|---|---|---|---|---|---|---|---|---|
| Norway (Walstad) | 0 | 1 | 1 | 0 | 1 | 1 | 0 | 0 | 2 | 1 | 7 |
| Switzerland (de Cruz) 🔨 | 1 | 0 | 0 | 1 | 0 | 0 | 0 | 2 | 0 | 0 | 4 |

| Sheet D | 1 | 2 | 3 | 4 | 5 | 6 | 7 | 8 | 9 | 10 | Final |
|---|---|---|---|---|---|---|---|---|---|---|---|
| China (Ma) | 0 | 0 | 0 | 0 | 1 | 1 | 0 | 2 | 0 | 0 | 4 |
| Sweden (Edin) 🔨 | 0 | 0 | 1 | 2 | 0 | 0 | 2 | 0 | 0 | 1 | 6 |

=== Draw 2 ===
Thursday, 10 February, 14:05

| Sheet A | 1 | 2 | 3 | 4 | 5 | 6 | 7 | 8 | 9 | 10 | Final |
|---|---|---|---|---|---|---|---|---|---|---|---|
| United States (Shuster) 🔨 | 1 | 0 | 1 | 0 | 0 | 2 | 0 | 0 | 0 | X | 4 |
| Sweden (Edin) | 0 | 2 | 0 | 2 | 1 | 0 | 1 | 1 | 0 | X | 7 |

| Sheet B | 1 | 2 | 3 | 4 | 5 | 6 | 7 | 8 | 9 | 10 | Final |
|---|---|---|---|---|---|---|---|---|---|---|---|
| Norway (Walstad) | 0 | 2 | 0 | 0 | 1 | 0 | 0 | 0 | 2 | 0 | 5 |
| Canada (Gushue) 🔨 | 2 | 0 | 0 | 1 | 0 | 0 | 0 | 2 | 0 | 1 | 6 |

| Sheet C | 1 | 2 | 3 | 4 | 5 | 6 | 7 | 8 | 9 | 10 | Final |
|---|---|---|---|---|---|---|---|---|---|---|---|
| China (Ma) 🔨 | 1 | 1 | 0 | 1 | 0 | 0 | 0 | 1 | 0 | X | 4 |
| ROC (Glukhov) | 0 | 0 | 1 | 0 | 1 | 1 | 0 | 0 | 4 | X | 7 |

| Sheet D | 1 | 2 | 3 | 4 | 5 | 6 | 7 | 8 | 9 | 10 | Final |
|---|---|---|---|---|---|---|---|---|---|---|---|
| Great Britain (Mouat) | 0 | 1 | 0 | 2 | 0 | 0 | 2 | 1 | 0 | 1 | 7 |
| Italy (Retornaz) 🔨 | 2 | 0 | 1 | 0 | 0 | 1 | 0 | 0 | 1 | 0 | 5 |

=== Draw 3 ===
Friday, 11 February, 9:05

| Sheet A | 1 | 2 | 3 | 4 | 5 | 6 | 7 | 8 | 9 | 10 | Final |
|---|---|---|---|---|---|---|---|---|---|---|---|
| Switzerland (de Cruz) 🔨 | 0 | 0 | 3 | 0 | 0 | 0 | 0 | 3 | 0 | X | 6 |
| ROC (Glukhov) | 0 | 0 | 0 | 2 | 1 | 0 | 0 | 0 | 0 | X | 3 |

| Sheet B | 1 | 2 | 3 | 4 | 5 | 6 | 7 | 8 | 9 | 10 | Final |
|---|---|---|---|---|---|---|---|---|---|---|---|
| Great Britain (Mouat) | 0 | 0 | 2 | 0 | 2 | 2 | 0 | 1 | 0 | X | 7 |
| United States (Shuster) 🔨 | 0 | 2 | 0 | 3 | 0 | 0 | 2 | 0 | 2 | X | 9 |

| Sheet C | 1 | 2 | 3 | 4 | 5 | 6 | 7 | 8 | 9 | 10 | Final |
|---|---|---|---|---|---|---|---|---|---|---|---|
| Sweden (Edin) 🔨 | 0 | 1 | 0 | 2 | 0 | 3 | 0 | 3 | X | X | 9 |
| Italy (Retornaz) | 0 | 0 | 1 | 0 | 1 | 0 | 1 | 0 | X | X | 3 |

| Sheet D | 1 | 2 | 3 | 4 | 5 | 6 | 7 | 8 | 9 | 10 | Final |
|---|---|---|---|---|---|---|---|---|---|---|---|
| Denmark (Krause) | 0 | 1 | 0 | 1 | 0 | 1 | 0 | 1 | 0 | 0 | 4 |
| China (Ma) 🔨 | 1 | 0 | 1 | 0 | 2 | 0 | 1 | 0 | 0 | 0 | 5 |

=== Draw 4 ===
Friday, 11 February, 20:05

| Sheet B | 1 | 2 | 3 | 4 | 5 | 6 | 7 | 8 | 9 | 10 | Final |
|---|---|---|---|---|---|---|---|---|---|---|---|
| ROC (Glukhov) 🔨 | 0 | 2 | 0 | 2 | 6 | 0 | X | X | X | X | 10 |
| Denmark (Krause) | 0 | 0 | 1 | 0 | 0 | 1 | X | X | X | X | 2 |

| Sheet C | 1 | 2 | 3 | 4 | 5 | 6 | 7 | 8 | 9 | 10 | Final |
|---|---|---|---|---|---|---|---|---|---|---|---|
| Great Britain (Mouat) 🔨 | 1 | 0 | 2 | 2 | 0 | 3 | 0 | X | X | X | 8 |
| Norway (Walstad) | 0 | 1 | 0 | 0 | 1 | 0 | 1 | X | X | X | 3 |

| Sheet D | 1 | 2 | 3 | 4 | 5 | 6 | 7 | 8 | 9 | 10 | Final |
|---|---|---|---|---|---|---|---|---|---|---|---|
| Canada (Gushue) | 0 | 0 | 1 | 0 | 0 | 2 | 0 | 0 | 0 | X | 3 |
| Switzerland (de Cruz) 🔨 | 1 | 1 | 0 | 0 | 1 | 0 | 0 | 1 | 1 | X | 5 |

=== Draw 5 ===
Saturday, 12 February, 14:05

| Sheet A | 1 | 2 | 3 | 4 | 5 | 6 | 7 | 8 | 9 | 10 | Final |
|---|---|---|---|---|---|---|---|---|---|---|---|
| Italy (Retornaz) | 0 | 1 | 0 | 3 | 0 | 2 | 1 | 0 | 2 | 0 | 9 |
| China (Ma) 🔨 | 2 | 0 | 3 | 0 | 3 | 0 | 0 | 3 | 0 | 1 | 12 |

| Sheet B | 1 | 2 | 3 | 4 | 5 | 6 | 7 | 8 | 9 | 10 | Final |
|---|---|---|---|---|---|---|---|---|---|---|---|
| Canada (Gushue) | 0 | 0 | 0 | 0 | 2 | 0 | 0 | 2 | 0 | 0 | 4 |
| Sweden (Edin) 🔨 | 0 | 1 | 0 | 1 | 0 | 2 | 1 | 0 | 1 | 1 | 7 |

| Sheet C | 1 | 2 | 3 | 4 | 5 | 6 | 7 | 8 | 9 | 10 | Final |
|---|---|---|---|---|---|---|---|---|---|---|---|
| Denmark (Krause) | 0 | 1 | 0 | 2 | 0 | 1 | 0 | 0 | 2 | 0 | 6 |
| Switzerland (de Cruz) 🔨 | 2 | 0 | 2 | 0 | 2 | 0 | 0 | 1 | 0 | 1 | 8 |

| Sheet D | 1 | 2 | 3 | 4 | 5 | 6 | 7 | 8 | 9 | 10 | Final |
|---|---|---|---|---|---|---|---|---|---|---|---|
| United States (Shuster) | 0 | 2 | 0 | 1 | 0 | 0 | 2 | 0 | 0 | 1 | 6 |
| Norway (Walstad) 🔨 | 1 | 0 | 1 | 0 | 2 | 2 | 0 | 1 | 0 | 0 | 7 |

=== Draw 6 ===
Sunday, 13 February, 9:05

| Sheet A | 1 | 2 | 3 | 4 | 5 | 6 | 7 | 8 | 9 | 10 | Final |
|---|---|---|---|---|---|---|---|---|---|---|---|
| Norway (Walstad) | 0 | 0 | 1 | 1 | 0 | 1 | 0 | 1 | 0 | 0 | 4 |
| Sweden (Edin) 🔨 | 0 | 1 | 0 | 0 | 0 | 0 | 2 | 0 | 1 | 2 | 6 |

| Sheet B | 1 | 2 | 3 | 4 | 5 | 6 | 7 | 8 | 9 | 10 | Final |
|---|---|---|---|---|---|---|---|---|---|---|---|
| China (Ma) 🔨 | 1 | 0 | 0 | 2 | 0 | 0 | 0 | 0 | 1 | 2 | 6 |
| Great Britain (Mouat) | 0 | 4 | 0 | 0 | 0 | 0 | 0 | 3 | 0 | 0 | 7 |

| Sheet C | 1 | 2 | 3 | 4 | 5 | 6 | 7 | 8 | 9 | 10 | Final |
|---|---|---|---|---|---|---|---|---|---|---|---|
| United States (Shuster) | 0 | 0 | 1 | 0 | 0 | 3 | 0 | 1 | 0 | X | 5 |
| Canada (Gushue) 🔨 | 1 | 4 | 0 | 1 | 1 | 0 | 1 | 0 | 2 | X | 10 |

| Sheet D | 1 | 2 | 3 | 4 | 5 | 6 | 7 | 8 | 9 | 10 | Final |
|---|---|---|---|---|---|---|---|---|---|---|---|
| Italy (Retornaz) | 0 | 0 | 3 | 0 | 3 | 0 | 0 | 1 | 0 | X | 7 |
| ROC (Glukhov) 🔨 | 0 | 3 | 0 | 3 | 0 | 0 | 1 | 0 | 3 | X | 10 |

=== Draw 7 ===
Sunday, 13 February, 20:05

| Sheet A | 1 | 2 | 3 | 4 | 5 | 6 | 7 | 8 | 9 | 10 | Final |
|---|---|---|---|---|---|---|---|---|---|---|---|
| Great Britain (Mouat) 🔨 | 2 | 0 | 2 | 0 | 0 | 1 | 0 | 3 | X | X | 8 |
| Denmark (Krause) | 0 | 0 | 0 | 0 | 1 | 0 | 1 | 0 | X | X | 2 |

| Sheet B | 1 | 2 | 3 | 4 | 5 | 6 | 7 | 8 | 9 | 10 | Final |
|---|---|---|---|---|---|---|---|---|---|---|---|
| Switzerland (de Cruz) 🔨 | 1 | 0 | 1 | 0 | 2 | 0 | 0 | 0 | 0 | X | 4 |
| Italy (Retornaz) | 0 | 1 | 0 | 1 | 0 | 3 | 0 | 1 | 2 | X | 8 |

| Sheet D | 1 | 2 | 3 | 4 | 5 | 6 | 7 | 8 | 9 | 10 | Final |
|---|---|---|---|---|---|---|---|---|---|---|---|
| China (Ma) 🔨 | 1 | 0 | 1 | 0 | 1 | 0 | 0 | 2 | 1 | 0 | 6 |
| United States (Shuster) | 0 | 2 | 0 | 3 | 0 | 2 | 0 | 0 | 0 | 1 | 8 |

=== Draw 8 ===
Monday, 14 February, 14:05

| Sheet A | 1 | 2 | 3 | 4 | 5 | 6 | 7 | 8 | 9 | 10 | Final |
|---|---|---|---|---|---|---|---|---|---|---|---|
| Canada (Gushue) | 1 | 0 | 1 | 0 | 0 | 2 | 0 | 0 | 3 | X | 7 |
| Italy (Retornaz) 🔨 | 0 | 1 | 0 | 1 | 0 | 0 | 0 | 1 | 0 | X | 3 |

| Sheet B | 1 | 2 | 3 | 4 | 5 | 6 | 7 | 8 | 9 | 10 | 11 | Final |
|---|---|---|---|---|---|---|---|---|---|---|---|---|
| Denmark (Krause) 🔨 | 1 | 0 | 0 | 1 | 1 | 0 | 1 | 0 | 1 | 0 | 1 | 6 |
| Norway (Walstad) | 0 | 1 | 0 | 0 | 0 | 2 | 0 | 1 | 0 | 1 | 0 | 5 |

| Sheet C | 1 | 2 | 3 | 4 | 5 | 6 | 7 | 8 | 9 | 10 | Final |
|---|---|---|---|---|---|---|---|---|---|---|---|
| ROC (Glukhov) | 0 | 1 | 0 | 0 | 0 | 2 | 0 | 2 | 0 | 0 | 5 |
| Sweden (Edin) 🔨 | 1 | 0 | 0 | 2 | 1 | 0 | 2 | 0 | 0 | 1 | 7 |

| Sheet D | 1 | 2 | 3 | 4 | 5 | 6 | 7 | 8 | 9 | 10 | Final |
|---|---|---|---|---|---|---|---|---|---|---|---|
| Switzerland (de Cruz) | 0 | 0 | 1 | 0 | 1 | 1 | 0 | 0 | 2 | 0 | 5 |
| Great Britain (Mouat) 🔨 | 0 | 1 | 0 | 2 | 0 | 0 | 1 | 1 | 0 | 1 | 6 |

=== Draw 9 ===
Tuesday, 15 February, 9:05

| Sheet A | 1 | 2 | 3 | 4 | 5 | 6 | 7 | 8 | 9 | 10 | Final |
|---|---|---|---|---|---|---|---|---|---|---|---|
| ROC (Glukhov) | 0 | 1 | 0 | 0 | 2 | 0 | 2 | 0 | 0 | X | 5 |
| Norway (Walstad) 🔨 | 3 | 0 | 1 | 4 | 0 | 1 | 0 | 1 | 2 | X | 12 |

| Sheet B | 1 | 2 | 3 | 4 | 5 | 6 | 7 | 8 | 9 | 10 | Final |
|---|---|---|---|---|---|---|---|---|---|---|---|
| Canada (Gushue) | 0 | 2 | 0 | 2 | 0 | 2 | 0 | 3 | 0 | 1 | 10 |
| China (Ma) 🔨 | 1 | 0 | 2 | 0 | 2 | 0 | 1 | 0 | 2 | 0 | 8 |

| Sheet C | 1 | 2 | 3 | 4 | 5 | 6 | 7 | 8 | 9 | 10 | Final |
|---|---|---|---|---|---|---|---|---|---|---|---|
| Switzerland (de Cruz) 🔨 | 1 | 0 | 0 | 1 | 0 | 2 | 0 | 0 | 0 | X | 4 |
| United States (Shuster) | 0 | 2 | 0 | 0 | 1 | 0 | 2 | 1 | 1 | X | 7 |

| Sheet D | 1 | 2 | 3 | 4 | 5 | 6 | 7 | 8 | 9 | 10 | Final |
|---|---|---|---|---|---|---|---|---|---|---|---|
| Sweden (Edin) 🔨 | 0 | 1 | 0 | 1 | 0 | 3 | 0 | 2 | 1 | X | 8 |
| Denmark (Krause) | 0 | 0 | 1 | 0 | 1 | 0 | 1 | 0 | 0 | X | 3 |

=== Draw 10 ===
Tuesday, 15 February, 20:05

| Sheet A | 1 | 2 | 3 | 4 | 5 | 6 | 7 | 8 | 9 | 10 | Final |
|---|---|---|---|---|---|---|---|---|---|---|---|
| Sweden (Edin) 🔨 | 0 | 0 | 1 | 0 | 1 | 0 | 1 | 0 | 2 | 1 | 6 |
| Great Britain (Mouat) | 1 | 2 | 0 | 1 | 0 | 1 | 0 | 2 | 0 | 0 | 7 |

| Sheet B | 1 | 2 | 3 | 4 | 5 | 6 | 7 | 8 | 9 | 10 | Final |
|---|---|---|---|---|---|---|---|---|---|---|---|
| Italy (Retornaz) 🔨 | 1 | 0 | 2 | 0 | 2 | 0 | 1 | 4 | X | X | 10 |
| United States (Shuster) | 0 | 2 | 0 | 1 | 0 | 1 | 0 | 0 | X | X | 4 |

| Sheet C | 1 | 2 | 3 | 4 | 5 | 6 | 7 | 8 | 9 | 10 | Final |
|---|---|---|---|---|---|---|---|---|---|---|---|
| Norway (Walstad) | 0 | 1 | 0 | 2 | 0 | 0 | 1 | 0 | 2 | 0 | 6 |
| China (Ma) 🔨 | 1 | 0 | 2 | 0 | 0 | 1 | 0 | 3 | 0 | 1 | 8 |

| Sheet D | 1 | 2 | 3 | 4 | 5 | 6 | 7 | 8 | 9 | 10 | 11 | Final |
|---|---|---|---|---|---|---|---|---|---|---|---|---|
| ROC (Glukhov) 🔨 | 0 | 1 | 1 | 1 | 0 | 1 | 0 | 0 | 2 | 0 | 1 | 7 |
| Canada (Gushue) | 1 | 0 | 0 | 0 | 1 | 0 | 1 | 1 | 0 | 2 | 0 | 6 |

=== Draw 11 ===
Wednesday, 16 February, 14:05

| Sheet A | 1 | 2 | 3 | 4 | 5 | 6 | 7 | 8 | 9 | 10 | Final |
|---|---|---|---|---|---|---|---|---|---|---|---|
| China (Ma) | 0 | 0 | 1 | 0 | 2 | 0 | 0 | 1 | 0 | 2 | 6 |
| Switzerland (de Cruz) 🔨 | 0 | 2 | 0 | 1 | 0 | 0 | 1 | 0 | 1 | 0 | 5 |

| Sheet B | 1 | 2 | 3 | 4 | 5 | 6 | 7 | 8 | 9 | 10 | Final |
|---|---|---|---|---|---|---|---|---|---|---|---|
| Great Britain (Mouat) 🔨 | 3 | 0 | 1 | 1 | 0 | 1 | 0 | 1 | 0 | 1 | 8 |
| ROC (Glukhov) | 0 | 1 | 0 | 0 | 1 | 0 | 2 | 0 | 2 | 0 | 6 |

| Sheet C | 1 | 2 | 3 | 4 | 5 | 6 | 7 | 8 | 9 | 10 | Final |
|---|---|---|---|---|---|---|---|---|---|---|---|
| Italy (Retornaz) | 0 | 2 | 2 | 1 | 0 | 4 | 1 | X | X | X | 10 |
| Denmark (Krause) 🔨 | 2 | 0 | 0 | 0 | 1 | 0 | 0 | X | X | X | 3 |

=== Draw 12 ===
Thursday, 17 February, 9:05

| Sheet A | 1 | 2 | 3 | 4 | 5 | 6 | 7 | 8 | 9 | 10 | Final |
|---|---|---|---|---|---|---|---|---|---|---|---|
| Denmark (Krause) 🔨 | 1 | 1 | 0 | 0 | 1 | 0 | 0 | 0 | 2 | X | 5 |
| United States (Shuster) | 0 | 0 | 2 | 3 | 0 | 0 | 1 | 1 | 0 | X | 7 |

| Sheet B | 1 | 2 | 3 | 4 | 5 | 6 | 7 | 8 | 9 | 10 | Final |
|---|---|---|---|---|---|---|---|---|---|---|---|
| Sweden (Edin) 🔨 | 3 | 0 | 0 | 2 | 0 | 1 | 1 | 0 | 1 | 0 | 8 |
| Switzerland (de Cruz) | 0 | 0 | 2 | 0 | 3 | 0 | 0 | 2 | 0 | 3 | 10 |

| Sheet C | 1 | 2 | 3 | 4 | 5 | 6 | 7 | 8 | 9 | 10 | Final |
|---|---|---|---|---|---|---|---|---|---|---|---|
| Canada (Gushue) | 0 | 2 | 0 | 0 | 0 | 0 | 0 | 0 | X | X | 2 |
| Great Britain (Mouat) 🔨 | 2 | 0 | 0 | 1 | 0 | 1 | 0 | 1 | X | X | 5 |

| Sheet D | 1 | 2 | 3 | 4 | 5 | 6 | 7 | 8 | 9 | 10 | Final |
|---|---|---|---|---|---|---|---|---|---|---|---|
| Norway (Walstad) | 0 | 0 | 2 | 0 | 1 | 0 | 2 | 2 | 2 | X | 9 |
| Italy (Retornaz) 🔨 | 1 | 1 | 0 | 2 | 0 | 0 | 0 | 0 | 0 | X | 4 |

== Playoffs ==
Semifinals
1 | Great Britain | 8
4 | United States | 4
2 | Sweden | 5
3 | Canada | 3

Gold medal game
1 | Great Britain | 4
2 | Sweden | 5
Bronze medal game
4 | United States | 5
3 | Canada | 8

=== Semifinals ===
Thursday, 17 February, 20:05

| Sheet A | 1 | 2 | 3 | 4 | 5 | 6 | 7 | 8 | 9 | 10 | Final |
|---|---|---|---|---|---|---|---|---|---|---|---|
| Sweden (Edin) 🔨 | 0 | 1 | 0 | 2 | 0 | 0 | 0 | 1 | 0 | 1 | 5 |
| Canada (Gushue) | 0 | 0 | 1 | 0 | 2 | 0 | 0 | 0 | 0 | 0 | 3 |

Player percentages
| Sweden | | Canada | |
|---|---|---|---|
| Christoffer Sundgren | 95% | Geoff Walker | 93% |
| Rasmus Wranå | 84% | Brett Gallant | 69% |
| Oskar Eriksson | 89% | Mark Nichols | 79% |
| Niklas Edin | 90% | Brad Gushue | 76% |
| Total | 90% | Total | 79% |

| Sheet C | 1 | 2 | 3 | 4 | 5 | 6 | 7 | 8 | 9 | 10 | Final |
|---|---|---|---|---|---|---|---|---|---|---|---|
| United States (Shuster) | 0 | 2 | 0 | 2 | 0 | 0 | 0 | 0 | 0 | 0 | 4 |
| Great Britain (Mouat) 🔨 | 0 | 0 | 3 | 0 | 2 | 0 | 0 | 0 | 1 | 2 | 8 |

Player percentages
| United States | | Great Britain | |
|---|---|---|---|
| John Landsteiner | 79% | Hammy McMillan Jr. | 96% |
| Matt Hamilton | 88% | Bobby Lammie | 90% |
| Chris Plys | 73% | Grant Hardie | 84% |
| John Shuster | 87% | Bruce Mouat | 90% |
| Total | 82% | Total | 90% |

=== Bronze medal game ===
Friday, 18 February, 14:05

| Sheet B | 1 | 2 | 3 | 4 | 5 | 6 | 7 | 8 | 9 | 10 | Final |
|---|---|---|---|---|---|---|---|---|---|---|---|
| Canada (Gushue) 🔨 | 2 | 0 | 1 | 0 | 1 | 0 | 0 | 2 | 2 | X | 8 |
| United States (Shuster) | 0 | 1 | 0 | 2 | 0 | 2 | 0 | 0 | 0 | X | 5 |

Player percentages
| Canada | | United States | |
|---|---|---|---|
| Geoff Walker | 84% | John Landsteiner | 80% |
| Brett Gallant | 86% | Matt Hamilton | 86% |
| Mark Nichols | 78% | Chris Plys | 74% |
| Brad Gushue | 78% | John Shuster | 69% |
| Total | 82% | Total | 77% |

=== Gold medal game ===
Saturday, 19 February, 14:50

| Sheet B | 1 | 2 | 3 | 4 | 5 | 6 | 7 | 8 | 9 | 10 | 11 | Final |
|---|---|---|---|---|---|---|---|---|---|---|---|---|
| Sweden (Edin) | 0 | 2 | 1 | 0 | 0 | 0 | 0 | 1 | 0 | 0 | 1 | 5 |
| Great Britain (Mouat) 🔨 | 1 | 0 | 0 | 1 | 0 | 0 | 1 | 0 | 0 | 1 | 0 | 4 |

Player percentages
| Sweden | | Great Britain | |
|---|---|---|---|
| Christoffer Sundgren | 99% | Hammy McMillan Jr. | 95% |
| Rasmus Wranå | 95% | Bobby Lammie | 80% |
| Oskar Eriksson | 93% | Grant Hardie | 94% |
| Niklas Edin | 87% | Bruce Mouat | 89% |
| Total | 94% | Total | 90% |

== Final standings ==
The final standings are:

| Place | Team |
|---|---|
| 1st place, gold medalist(s) | Sweden |
| 2nd place, silver medalist(s) | Great Britain |
| 3rd place, bronze medalist(s) | Canada |
| 4 | United States |
| 5 | China |
| 6 | Norway |
| 7 | Switzerland |
| 8 | ROC |
| 9 | Italy |
| 10 | Denmark |

== Statistics ==
=== Player percentages ===
Percentages by draw.

==== Lead ====
| # | Curler | 1 | 2 | 3 | 4 | 5 | 6 | 7 | 8 | 9 | Total |
|---|---|---|---|---|---|---|---|---|---|---|---|
| 1 | Hammy McMillan Jr. (GBR) | 83 | 93 | 98 | 92 | 91 | 94 | 88 | 94 | 94 | 91.6 |
| 2 | Magnus Vågberg (NOR) | 89 | 93 | 98 | 84 | 96 | 91 | 86 | 94 | 96 | 91.6 |
| 3 | Geoff Walker (CAN) | 95 | 91 | 91 | 99 | 85 | 94 | 89 | 82 | 93 | 90.8 |
| 4 | Valentin Tanner (SUI) | 86 | 79 | 81 | 96 | 96 | 95 | 91 | 88 | 90 | 89.2 |
| 5 | Christoffer Sundgren (SWE) | 84 | 81 | 91 | 95 | 94 | 79 | 85 | 93 | 96 | 88.5 |
| 6 | Anton Kalalb (ROC) | 89 | 86 | 81 | 83 | 86 | 88 | 94 | 84 | 100 | 88.1 |
| 7 | John Landsteiner (USA) | 83 | 88 | 93 | 84 | 80 | 86 | 93 | 92 | 88 | 87.5 |
| 8 | Kasper Wiksten (DEN) | 78 | 84 | 96 | 91 | 83 | 89 | – | 88 | 93 | 87.5 |
| 9 | Xu Jingtao (CHN) | 79 | 84 | 89 | 83 | 98 | 79 | 86 | 86 | 99 | 86.9 |
| 10 | Simone Gonin (ITA) | 88 | 92 | 84 | 85 | – | 81 | – | – | – | 85.6 |

==== Second ====
| # | Curler | 1 | 2 | 3 | 4 | 5 | 6 | 7 | 8 | 9 | Total |
|---|---|---|---|---|---|---|---|---|---|---|---|
| 1 | Wang Zhiyu (CHN) | 85 | 88 | 86 | 79 | 91 | 88 | 89 | 90 | 95 | 87.8 |
| 2 | Bobby Lammie (GBR) | 88 | 78 | 79 | 83 | 83 | 80 | 93 | 95 | 89 | 85.3 |
| 3 | Peter de Cruz (SUI) | 86 | 84 | 84 | 93 | 81 | 75 | 89 | 91 | 84 | 85.1 |
| 4 | Rasmus Wranå (SWE) | 90 | 84 | 88 | 89 | 81 | 95 | 81 | 74 | 83 | 84.8 |
| 5 | Matt Hamilton (USA) | 85 | 89 | 81 | 73 | 74 | 95 | 93 | 80 | 84 | 83.8 |
| 6 | Brett Gallant (CAN) | 78 | 89 | 90 | 83 | 93 | 74 | 88 | 84 | 61 | 81.9 |
| 7 | Sebastiano Arman (ITA) | 76 | 80 | 80 | 88 | 87 | 79 | 78 | 89 | 71 | 80.7 |
| 8 | Markus Høiberg (NOR) | 71 | 84 | 93 | 81 | 79 | 77 | 88 | 91 | 53 | 79.4 |
| 9 | Dmitry Mironov (ROC) | 83 | 71 | 78 | 73 | 83 | 86 | 82 | 84 | 58 | 77.7 |
| 10 | Henrik Holtermann (DEN) | 77 | 88 | 65 | 89 | 91 | 67 | 82 | 82 | 51 | 76.6 |

==== Third ====
| # | Curler | 1 | 2 | 3 | 4 | 5 | 6 | 7 | 8 | 9 | Total |
|---|---|---|---|---|---|---|---|---|---|---|---|
| 1 | Grant Hardie (GBR) | 90 | 78 | 91 | 90 | 83 | 81 | 86 | 96 | 88 | 86.9 |
| 2 | Oskar Eriksson (SWE) | 90 | 79 | 84 | 93 | 81 | 94 | 90 | 84 | 83 | 86.4 |
| 3 | Zou Qiang (CHN) | 88 | 88 | 90 | 81 | 76 | 91 | 86 | 85 | 89 | 86.0 |
| 4 | Torger Nergård (NOR) | 81 | 88 | 80 | 95 | 88 | 84 | 86 | 78 | 76 | 84.2 |
| 5 | Mark Nichols (CAN) | 75 | 89 | 83 | 94 | 90 | 85 | 80 | 67 | 71 | 81.4 |
| 6 | Amos Mosaner (ITA) | 84 | 78 | 90 | 83 | 90 | 76 | 67 | 79 | 81 | 81.3 |
| 7 | Chris Plys (USA) | 88 | 70 | 76 | 80 | 75 | 93 | 83 | 72 | 89 | 80.8 |
| 8 | Sven Michel (SUI) | 86 | 86 | 79 | 89 | 73 | 80 | 78 | 73 | 85 | 80.6 |
| 9 | Evgeny Klimov (ROC) | 81 | 76 | 80 | 92 | 88 | 74 | 69 | 75 | 79 | 78.7 |
| 10 | Mads Nørgård (DEN) | 81 | 71 | 65 | 76 | 75 | 91 | 76 | 63 | 68 | 74.8 |

==== Fourth ====
| # | Curler | 1 | 2 | 3 | 4 | 5 | 6 | 7 | 8 | 9 | Total |
|---|---|---|---|---|---|---|---|---|---|---|---|
| 1 | Bruce Mouat (GBR) | 90 | 74 | 95 | 99 | 94 | 83 | 93 | 88 | 85 | 88.5 |
| 2 | Niklas Edin (SWE) | 87 | 88 | 100 | 76 | 75 | 84 | 93 | 66 | 81 | 82.8 |
| 3 | Benoît Schwarz (SUI) | 76 | 83 | 81 | 95 | 72 | 84 | 69 | 94 | 88 | 82.7 |
| 4 | Brad Gushue (CAN) | 81 | 99 | 89 | 57 | 94 | 92 | 90 | 75 | 68 | 82.6 |
| 5 | Steffen Walstad (NOR) | 84 | 85 | 88 | 76 | 75 | 88 | 88 | 79 | 81 | 82.3 |
| 6 | Ma Xiuyue (CHN) | 74 | 68 | 79 | 89 | 79 | 88 | 69 | 88 | 96 | 81.0 |
| 7 | John Shuster (USA) | 81 | 71 | 93 | 76 | 81 | 89 | 75 | 77 | 83 | 80.7 |
| 8 | Sergey Glukhov (ROC) | 80 | 88 | 88 | 90 | 84 | 78 | 61 | 77 | 80 | 80.1 |
| 9 | Joël Retornaz (ITA) | 85 | 73 | 86 | 64 | 86 | 82 | 81 | 88 | 67 | 79.1 |
| 10 | Mikkel Krause (DEN) | 64 | 76 | 75 | 85 | 66 | 78 | 76 | 50 | 83 | 73.7 |

==== Alternate ====
| # | Curler | 1 | 2 | 3 | 4 | 5 | 6 | 7 | 8 | 9 | Total |
|---|---|---|---|---|---|---|---|---|---|---|---|
| 1 | Marc Kennedy (CAN) | – | – | – | – | 100 (2) | – | – | – | – | 100.0 |
| 2 | Mattia Giovanella (ITA) | – | – | – | – | 92 (1) | – | 78 (1) | 96 (1) | 78 (1) | 85.8 |
| 3 | Tobias Thune (DEN) | – | – | – | – | – | – | 85 (1) | – | – | 84.7 |
| 4 | Pablo Lachat (SUI) | – | – | – | – | – | – | – | – | 83 (1) | 82.5 |
| 5 | Colin Hufman (USA) | – | – | – | – | 72 (1) | – | – | – | – | 71.9 |

==== Team total ====
| # | Team | 1 | 2 | 3 | 4 | 5 | 6 | 7 | 8 | 9 | Total |
|---|---|---|---|---|---|---|---|---|---|---|---|
| 1 | Great Britain | 88 | 80 | 91 | 91 | 88 | 84 | 90 | 93 | 89 | 88.0 |
| 2 | Sweden | 88 | 83 | 91 | 88 | 83 | 88 | 87 | 79 | 86 | 85.7 |
| 3 | China | 81 | 82 | 86 | 83 | 86 | 86 | 83 | 87 | 95 | 85.4 |
| 4 | Switzerland | 84 | 83 | 81 | 93 | 81 | 83 | 82 | 86 | 86 | 84.5 |
| 5 | Canada | 82 | 92 | 88 | 83 | 91 | 86 | 87 | 77 | 73 | 84.4 |
| 6 | Norway | 81 | 87 | 90 | 84 | 84 | 85 | 87 | 85 | 77 | 84.4 |
| 7 | United States | 84 | 79 | 86 | 78 | 76 | 91 | 86 | 80 | 86 | 83.0 |
| 8 | Italy | 83 | 81 | 85 | 80 | 89 | 80 | 76 | 88 | 74 | 81.7 |
| 9 | ROC | 83 | 80 | 81 | 84 | 85 | 81 | 77 | 80 | 79 | 81.2 |
| 10 | Denmark | 75 | 80 | 75 | 85 | 79 | 81 | 80 | 71 | 73 | 78.1 |
