= 2018–19 Curling World Cup – Second Leg =

2018–19 Curling World Cup Second Leg
- Host city: Omaha, United States
- Arena: Ralston Arena
- Dates: December 5–9, 2018
- Women's winner: Japan
- Skip: Satsuki Fujisawa
- Third: Chinami Yoshida
- Second: Yumi Suzuki
- Lead: Yurika Yoshida
- Alternate: Mari Motohashi
- Coach: J. D. Lind
- Finalist: South Korea (Kim)
- Men's winner: United States
- Skip: John Shuster
- Third: Chris Plys
- Second: Matt Hamilton
- Lead: John Landsteiner
- Coach: Don Bartlett
- Finalist: Sweden (Edin)
- Mixed doubles winner: Norway
- Female: Kristin Skaslien
- Male: Magnus Nedregotten
- Coach: Thomas Leovold
- Finalist: Switzerland (Perret/Rios)

The Second Leg of the 2018–19 Curling World Cup took place from December 5 to 9, 2018 at the Ralston Arena in Omaha, United States. Satsuki Fujisawa and her rink won the women's competition. John Shuster and his rink won the men's competition. Kristin Skaslien and Magnus Nedregotten won the mixed doubles competition.

== Format ==
Curling World Cup matches have eight ends, rather than the standard ten ends. Ties after eight ends will be decided by a shoot-out, with each team throwing a stone and the one closest to the button winning. A win in eight or fewer ends will earn a team 3 points, a shoot-out win 2 points, a shoot-out less 1 point, and 0 points for a loss in eight or fewer ends.

Each event will have eight teams in the men's, women's, and mixed doubles tournament. The teams will be split into two groups of four, based on the Curling World Cup rankings, whereby the 1st, 3rd, 5th, and 7th, ranked teams will be in one group and the 2nd, 4th, 6th, and 8th ranked teams in the other. The first place teams in each group will play against each other in the final. In the event of a tie for first place, a shoot-out will be used, with the same format used to decide matches tied after eight ends.

== Qualification ==
For the first three legs of the Curling World Cup, the eight spots in the tournament are allocated to each of the hosting member associations, the highest-ranked member association in each zone (the Americas, European, and Pacific-Asia), and two teams chosen by the World Curling Federation. Member associations may choose to send the same teams to all three legs or have different teams.

The following countries qualified for each discipline:

Qualification method	Women	Men	Mixed doubles
Hosting member association	China	China	China
Hosting member association	United States	United States	United States
Hosting member association	Sweden	Sweden	Sweden
Highest-ranked member association in the Americas zone	Canada	Canada	Canada
Highest-ranked member association in the European zone	Scotland	Switzerland	Switzerland
Highest-ranked member association in the Pacific-Asia zone	South Korea	Japan	South Korea
Selected by World Curling Federation	Japan	Norway	Russia
Selected by World Curling Federation	Russia	Scotland	Norway

== Women ==
=== Teams ===
Canada	China	Japan	Russia
Skip: Tracy Fleury; Third: Selena Njegovan; Second: Liz Fyfe; Lead: Kristin MacCuish	Skip: Yang Ying; Third: He Ying; Second: Meng Xu; Lead: Sun Chengyu	Skip: Satsuki Fujisawa; Third: Chinami Yoshida; Second: Yumi Suzuki; Lead: Yurika Yoshida	Skip: Alina Kovaleva; Third: Anastasia Bryzgalova; Second: Uliana Vasilyeva; Lead: Ekaterina Kuzmina
Scotland	South Korea	Sweden	United States
Skip: Eve Muirhead; Third: Jennifer Dodds; Second: Victoria Chalmers; Lead: Lauren Gray	Skip: Kim Min-ji; Third: Kim Hye-rin; Second: Yang Tae-i; Lead: Kim Su-jin	Skip: Anna Hasselborg; Third: Sara McManus; Second: Agnes Knochenhauer; Lead: Sofia Mabergs	Skip: Jamie Sinclair; Third: Sarah Anderson; Second: Taylor Anderson; Lead: Monica Walker

=== Round-robin standings ===
Group A
Country	Skip	W	SOW	SOL	L	Pts
South Korea	Kim Min-ji	4	0	0	2	12
Canada	Tracy Fleury	4	0	0	2	12
Russia	Alina Kovaleva	2	0	0	4	6
United States	Jamie Sinclair	2	0	0	4	6

Group B
Country	Skip	W	SOW	SOL	L	Pts
Japan	Satsuki Fujisawa	5	0	0	1	15
Scotland	Eve Muirhead	4	0	0	2	12
Sweden	Anna Hasselborg	3	0	0	3	9
China	Yang Ying	0	0	0	6	0

=== Round-robin results ===
==== Draw 1 ====
Wednesday, December 5, 15:00

Sheet A	1	2	3	4	5	6	7	8	Final
Canada (Fleury)	0	3	0	2	0	0	2	0	7
Russia (Kovaleva)	0	0	1	0	2	1	0	1	5

Sheet B	1	2	3	4	5	6	7	8	Final
South Korea (Kim)	0	0	3	0	1	0	1	X	5
United States (Sinclair)	2	1	0	2	0	4	0	X	9

Sheet C	1	2	3	4	5	6	7	8	Final
Sweden (Hasselborg)	0	2	0	0	1	1	1	0	5
Japan (Fujisawa)	1	0	2	0	0	0	0	3	6

Sheet D	1	2	3	4	5	6	7	8	Final
Scotland (Muirhead)	0	1	2	0	1	2	1	X	7
China (Yang)	0	0	0	1	0	0	0	X	1

==== Draw 4 ====
Thursday, December 6, 08:30

Sheet E	1	2	3	4	5	6	7	8	Final
Canada (Fleury)	0	2	0	1	0	0	1	X	4
South Korea (Kim)	4	0	0	0	1	1	0	X	6

==== Draw 5 ====
Thursday, December 6, 12:00

Sheet E	1	2	3	4	5	6	7	8	Final
Russia (Kovaleva)	2	0	0	1	0	0	2	0	5
United States (Sinclair)	0	3	1	0	0	1	0	2	7

==== Draw 6 ====
Thursday, December 6, 16:00

Sheet A	1	2	3	4	5	6	7	8	Final
Sweden (Hasselborg)	0	2	0	0	0	0	0	X	2
Scotland (Muirhead)	0	0	1	2	1	1	1	X	6

==== Draw 7 ====
Thursday, December 6, 19:30

Sheet A	1	2	3	4	5	6	7	8	Final
Japan (Fujisawa)	3	2	3	0	2	0	X	X	10
China (Yang)	0	0	0	1	0	1	X	X	2

==== Draw 8 ====
Friday, December 7, 08:30

Sheet C	1	2	3	4	5	6	7	8	Final
South Korea (Kim)	1	0	0	1	0	3	1	X	6
Russia (Kovaleva)	0	1	1	0	0	0	0	X	2

Sheet D	1	2	3	4	5	6	7	8	Final
United States (Sinclair)	0	1	0	1	1	2	0	0	5
Canada (Fleury)	1	0	3	0	0	0	2	1	7

==== Draw 9 ====
Friday, December 7, 12:00

Sheet B	1	2	3	4	5	6	7	8	Final
Scotland (Muirhead)	2	0	1	0	0	2	1	0	6
Japan (Fujisawa)	0	1	0	2	1	0	0	3	7

Sheet C	1	2	3	4	5	6	7	8	Final
China (Yang)	0	0	0	0	2	1	0	X	3
Sweden (Hasselborg)	1	1	2	2	0	0	1	X	7

==== Draw 10 ====
Friday, December 7, 16:00

Sheet A	1	2	3	4	5	6	7	8	Final
Russia (Kovaleva)	1	0	2	0	2	0	1	0	6
Canada (Fleury)	0	2	0	2	0	2	0	1	7

Sheet B	1	2	3	4	5	6	7	8	Final
United States (Sinclair)	0	2	0	0	3	0	2	0	7
South Korea (Kim)	1	0	1	2	0	3	0	1	8

==== Draw 11 ====
Friday, December 7, 19:30

Sheet B	1	2	3	4	5	6	7	8	Final
China (Yang)	1	0	1	0	0	1	X	X	3
Scotland (Muirhead)	0	4	0	3	3	0	X	X	10

Sheet D	1	2	3	4	5	6	7	8	Final
Japan (Fujisawa)	2	0	0	0	0	2	0	1	5
Sweden (Hasselborg)	0	1	0	1	1	0	1	0	4

==== Draw 12 ====
Saturday, December 8, 08:30

Sheet E	1	2	3	4	5	6	7	8	Final
South Korea (Kim)	0	0	2	1	0	1	0	1	5
Canada (Fleury)	0	0	0	0	1	0	2	0	3

==== Draw 13 ====
Saturday, December 8, 12:30

Sheet A	1	2	3	4	5	6	7	8	Final
Scotland (Muirhead)	0	0	0	1	0	0	1	X	2
Sweden (Hasselborg)	1	1	1	0	1	3	0	X	7

Sheet D	1	2	3	4	5	6	7	8	Final
China (Yang)	1	0	0	0	1	0	X	X	2
Japan (Fujisawa)	0	3	1	3	0	1	X	X	8

Sheet E	1	2	3	4	5	6	7	8	Final
United States (Sinclair)	1	0	2	0	1	0	X	X	4
Russia (Kovaleva)	0	1	0	6	0	2	X	X	9

==== Draw 15 ====
Saturday, December 8, 19:30

Sheet B	1	2	3	4	5	6	7	8	Final
Sweden (Hasselborg)	1	0	3	0	1	3	0	X	8
China (Yang)	0	1	0	1	0	0	1	X	3

Sheet C	1	2	3	4	5	6	7	8	Final
Canada (Fleury)	1	2	0	2	0	0	1	1	7
United States (Sinclair)	0	0	2	0	1	1	0	0	4

Sheet D	1	2	3	4	5	6	7	8	Final
Russia (Kovaleva)	1	0	2	0	0	3	0	1	7
South Korea (Kim)	0	1	0	0	2	0	1	0	4

Sheet E	1	2	3	4	5	6	7	8	Final
Japan (Fujisawa)	0	1	0	0	0	0	1	0	2
Scotland (Muirhead)	0	0	1	1	1	1	0	1	5

=== Final ===
Sunday, December 9, 12:00

Team	1	2	3	4	5	6	7	8	Final
South Korea (Kim)	0	4	0	1	1	0	0	0	6
Japan (Fujisawa)	2	0	1	0	0	1	1	2	7

Player percentages
South Korea		Japan	
Kim Su-jin	86%	Yurika Yoshida	92%
Yang Tae-i	91%	Yumi Suzuki	88%
Kim Hye-rin	80%	Chinami Yoshida	66%
Kim Min-ji	69%	Satsuki Fujisawa	72%
Total	81%	Total	79%

== Men ==
=== Teams ===
Canada	China	Japan	Norway
Skip: Jason Gunnlaugson; Third: Alex Forrest; Second: Denni Neufeld; Lead: Connor Njegovan	Skip: Zou Qiang; Third: Jiang Dongxu; Second: Shao Zhilin; Lead: Xu Jingtao	Skip: Yuta Matsumura; Third: Tetsuro Shimizu; Second: Yasumasa Tanida; Lead: Shinya Abe	Skip: Thomas Ulsrud; Third: Torger Nergård; Second: Christoffer Svae; Lead: Håvard Vad Petersson
Scotland	Sweden	Switzerland	United States
Skip: Bruce Mouat; Third: Grant Hardie; Second: Bobby Lammie; Lead: Hammy McMillan Jr.	Skip: Niklas Edin; Third: Oskar Eriksson; Second: Rasmus Wranå; Lead: Christoffer Sundgren	Skip: Yannick Schwaller; Third: Romano Meier; Second: Michael Brunner; Lead: Marcel Käufeler	Skip: John Shuster; Third: Chris Plys; Second: Matt Hamilton; Lead: John Landsteiner

=== Round-robin standings ===
Group A
Country	Skip	W	SOW	SOL	L	Pts
United States	John Shuster	5	0	0	1	15
China	Zou Qiang	3	0	0	3	9
Scotland	Bruce Mouat	3	0	0	3	9
Canada	Jason Gunnlaugson	1	0	0	5	3

Group B
Country	Skip	W	SOW	SOL	L	Pts
Sweden	Niklas Edin	5	0	0	1	15
Norway	Thomas Ulsrud	3	0	0	3	9
Japan	Yuta Matsumura	2	0	0	4	6
Switzerland	Yannick Schwaller	2	0	0	4	6

=== Round-robin results ===
==== Draw 3 ====
Wednesday, December 5, 21:00

Sheet A	1	2	3	4	5	6	7	8	Final
Scotland (Mouat)	0	1	0	2	0	4	1	0	8
Canada (Gunnlaugson)	1	0	3	0	1	0	0	1	6

Sheet B	1	2	3	4	5	6	7	8	Final
United States (Shuster)	0	0	1	0	0	0	1	1	3
China (Zou)	1	1	0	0	1	1	0	0	4

Sheet C	1	2	3	4	5	6	7	8	Final
Norway (Ulsrud)	3	0	0	3	0	4	X	X	10
Switzerland (Schwaller)	0	0	3	0	1	0	X	X	4

Sheet D	1	2	3	4	5	6	7	8	Final
Sweden (Edin)	1	0	0	5	0	1	0	X	7
Japan (Matsamura)	0	1	0	0	1	0	2	X	4

==== Draw 5 ====
Thursday, December 6, 12:00

Sheet A	1	2	3	4	5	6	7	8	Final
Norway (Ulsrud)	2	0	1	0	0	2	1	X	6
Sweden (Edin)	0	1	0	1	1	0	0	X	3

Sheet B	1	2	3	4	5	6	7	8	Final
Switzerland (Schwaller)	2	0	3	1	0	1	3	X	10
Japan (Matsamura)	0	2	0	0	2	0	0	X	4

Sheet C	1	2	3	4	5	6	7	8	Final
Scotland (Mouat)	1	0	0	0	2	0	X	X	3
United States (Shuster)	0	3	3	1	0	1	X	X	8

Sheet D	1	2	3	4	5	6	7	8	Final
Canada (Gunnlaugson)	2	2	0	0	0	2	0	X	6
China (Zou)	0	0	1	0	1	0	1	X	3

==== Draw 7 ====
Thursday, December 6, 19:30

Sheet B	1	2	3	4	5	6	7	8	Final
United States (Shuster)	1	0	1	1	1	0	0	1	5
Canada (Gunnlaugson)	0	1	0	0	0	1	1	0	3

Sheet C	1	2	3	4	5	6	7	8	Final
Sweden (Edin)	2	1	3	1	0	1	X	X	8
Switzerland (Schwaller)	0	0	0	0	2	0	X	X	2

Sheet D	1	2	3	4	5	6	7	8	Final
Japan (Matsamura)	1	0	2	0	0	2	0	2	7
Norway (Ulsrud)	0	2	0	1	1	0	1	0	5

Sheet E	1	2	3	4	5	6	7	8	Final
China (Zou)	0	1	1	0	1	1	0	1	5
Scotland (Mouat)	0	0	0	1	0	0	2	0	3

==== Draw 9 ====
Friday, December 7, 12:00

Sheet A	1	2	3	4	5	6	7	8	Final
Canada (Gunnlaugson)	2	0	2	0	1	0	0	0	5
Scotland (Mouat)	0	1	0	1	0	3	1	1	7

Sheet D	1	2	3	4	5	6	7	8	Final
China (Zou)	2	1	0	1	0	1	0	0	5
United States (Shuster)	0	0	1	0	2	0	0	3	6

==== Draw 10 ====
Friday, December 7, 16:00

Sheet C	1	2	3	4	5	6	7	8	Final
Switzerland (Schwaller)	1	1	1	0	1	0	2	0	6
Norway (Ulsrud)	0	0	0	2	0	2	0	1	5

Sheet E	1	2	3	4	5	6	7	8	Final
Japan (Matsamura)	0	0	1	0	1	0	X	X	2
Sweden (Edin)	1	2	0	3	0	1	X	X	7

==== Draw 12 ====
Saturday, December 8, 08:30

Sheet A	1	2	3	4	5	6	7	8	Final
China (Zou)	2	1	0	1	3	0	3	X	10
Canada (Gunnlaugson)	0	0	3	0	0	3	0	X	6

Sheet B	1	2	3	4	5	6	7	8	Final
Sweden (Edin)	1	1	0	3	0	2	X	X	7
Norway (Ulsrud)	0	0	1	0	1	0	X	X	2

Sheet C	1	2	3	4	5	6	7	8	Final
United States (Shuster)	1	0	1	0	0	3	1	0	6
Scotland (Mouat)	0	2	0	1	1	0	0	1	5

Sheet D	1	2	3	4	5	6	7	8	Final
Japan (Matsamura)	0	1	0	3	0	2	0	X	6
Switzerland (Schwaller)	0	0	1	0	2	0	1	X	4

==== Draw 14 ====
Saturday, December 8, 16:00

Sheet A	1	2	3	4	5	6	7	8	Final
Norway (Ulsrud)	2	0	0	3	2	2	X	X	9
Japan (Matsamura)	0	1	1	0	0	0	X	X	2

Sheet B	1	2	3	4	5	6	7	8	Final
Scotland (Mouat)	2	2	3	1	0	1	X	X	9
China (Zou)	0	0	0	0	1	0	X	X	1

Sheet E	1	2	3	4	5	6	7	8	Final
Canada (Gunnlaugson)	1	1	0	0	0	1	X	X	3
United States (Shuster)	0	0	4	1	2	0	X	X	7

==== Draw 15 ====
Saturday, December 8, 19:30

Sheet A	1	2	3	4	5	6	7	8	Final
Switzerland (Schwaller)	0	3	0	0	1	0	X	X	4
Sweden (Edin)	2	0	1	3	0	2	X	X	8

=== Final ===
Sunday, December 9, 16:00

Team	1	2	3	4	5	6	7	8	Final
United States (Shuster)	0	1	0	0	0	1	1	X	3
Sweden (Edin)	0	0	0	0	1	0	0	X	1

Player percentages
United States		Sweden	
John Landsteiner	92%	Christoffer Sundgren	94%
Matt Hamilton	80%	Rasmus Wranå	83%
Christopher Plys	73%	Oskar Eriksson	78%
John Shuster	83%	Niklas Edin	75%
Total	82%	Total	83%

== Mixed doubles ==
=== Teams ===
Canada	China	Norway	Russia
Female: Kalynn Park; Male: John Morris	Female: Wang Rui; Male: Ba Dexin	Female: Kristin Skaslien; Male: Magnus Nedregotten	Female: Anastasia Moskaleva; Male: Alexander Eremin
South Korea	Sweden	Switzerland	United States
Female: Jang Hye-ri; Male: Choi Chi-won	Female: Malin Wendel; Male: Fabian Wingfors	Female: Jenny Perret; Male: Martin Rios	Female: Tabitha Peterson; Male: Joe Polo

=== Round-robin standings ===
Group A
Country	Athletes	W	SOW	SOL	L	Pts
Switzerland	Jenny Perret / Martin Rios	5	1	0	0	17
South Korea	Jang Hye-ri / Choe Chi-won	3	0	0	3	9
Canada	Kalynn Park / John Morris	2	0	1	3	7
Sweden	Malin Wengdel / Fabian Wingfors	1	0	0	5	3

Group B
Country	Athletes	W	SOW	SOL	L	Pts
Norway	Kristin Skaslien / Magnus Nedregotten	4	0	0	2	12
United States	Tabitha Peterson / Joe Polo	3	1	0	2	11
China	Wang Rui / Ba Dexin	2	0	1	3	7
Russia	Anastasia Moskaleva / Alexander Eremin	2	0	0	4	6

=== Round-robin results ===
==== Draw 2 ====
Wednesday, December 5, 18:30

Sheet A	1	2	3	4	5	6	7	8	9	Final
Canada (Park/Morris)	0	0	2	1	0	2	0	0	0	5
Switzerland (Perret/Rios)	1	1	0	0	1	0	1	1	1	6

Sheet B	1	2	3	4	5	6	7	8	Final
Sweden (Wengdel/Wingfors)	1	1	0	0	0	0	0	X	2
South Korea (Jang/Choe)	0	0	1	2	3	2	1	X	9

Sheet C	1	2	3	4	5	6	7	8	Final
United States (Peterson/Polo)	1	0	1	2	0	3	0	2	9
Norway (Skaslien/Nedregotten)	0	2	0	0	2	0	2	0	6

Sheet D	1	2	3	4	5	6	7	8	Final
China (Wang/Ba)	1	0	0	2	0	2	0	0	5
Russia (Moskaleva/Eremin)	0	2	2	0	2	0	1	1	8

==== Draw 4 ====
Thursday, December 6, 08:30

Sheet A	1	2	3	4	5	6	7	8	Final
United States (Peterson/Polo)	0	3	0	1	0	0	1	0	5
China (Wang/Ba)	1	0	1	0	1	1	0	2	6

Sheet B	1	2	3	4	5	6	7	8	Final
Norway (Skaslien/Nedregotten)	1	2	0	0	0	3	0	3	9
Russia (Moskaleva/Eremin)	0	0	1	1	1	0	3	0	6

Sheet C	1	2	3	4	5	6	7	8	Final
Canada (Park/Morris)	0	4	1	0	1	0	3	0	9
Sweden (Wengdel/Wingfors)	1	0	0	2	0	2	0	1	6

Sheet D	1	2	3	4	5	6	7	8	Final
Switzerland (Perret/Rios)	0	0	3	1	2	0	1	1	8
South Korea (Jang/Choe)	1	1	0	0	0	2	0	0	4

==== Draw 6 ====
Thursday, December 6, 16:00

Sheet B	1	2	3	4	5	6	7	8	Final
Russia (Moskaleva/Eremin)	1	2	0	0	0	0	0	X	3
United States (Peterson/Polo)	0	0	2	2	1	1	2	X	8

Sheet C	1	2	3	4	5	6	7	8	Final
Sweden (Wengdel/Wingfors)	0	0	0	3	2	0	2	0	7
Switzerland (Perret/Rios)	1	1	1	0	0	2	0	4	9

Sheet D	1	2	3	4	5	6	7	8	Final
South Korea (Jang/Choe)	4	0	0	0	2	1	1	1	9
Canada (Park/Morris)	0	4	2	1	0	0	0	0	7

Sheet E	1	2	3	4	5	6	7	8	Final
China (Wang/Ba)	0	0	1	1	0	3	0	0	5
Norway (Skaslien/Nedregotten)	1	2	0	0	2	0	1	1	7

==== Draw 8 ====
Friday, December 7, 08:30

Sheet A	1	2	3	4	5	6	7	8	Final
Switzerland (Perret/Rios)	1	0	1	0	2	3	0	X	7
Canada (Park/Morris)	0	1	0	1	0	0	2	X	4

Sheet B	1	2	3	4	5	6	7	8	Final
South Korea (Jang/Choe)	2	0	1	0	0	1	0	3	7
Sweden (Wengdel/Wingfors)	0	2	0	2	1	0	1	0	6

Sheet E	1	2	3	4	5	6	7	8	Final
Russia (Moskaleva/Eremin)	3	0	0	1	0	0	X	X	4
China (Wang/Ba)	0	4	3	0	1	3	X	X	11

==== Draw 9 ====
Friday, December 7, 12:00

Sheet E	1	2	3	4	5	6	7	8	Final
Norway (Skaslien/Nedregotten)	1	0	0	0	2	2	1	0	6
United States (Peterson/Polo)	0	1	1	1	0	0	0	1	4

==== Draw 10 ====
Friday, December 7, 16:00

Sheet D	1	2	3	4	5	6	7	8	Final
Sweden (Wengdel/Wingfors)	3	0	4	0	1	0	1	0	9
Canada (Park/Morris)	0	2	0	2	0	1	0	1	6

==== Draw 11 ====
Friday, December 7, 19:30

Sheet A	1	2	3	4	5	6	7	8	Final
Russia (Moskaleva/Eremin)	1	0	3	0	1	0	3	0	8
Norway (Skaslien/Nedregotten)	0	1	0	2	0	2	0	1	6

Sheet C	1	2	3	4	5	6	7	8	9	Final
China (Wang/Ba)	1	0	2	0	0	2	0	2	0	7
United States (Peterson/Polo)	0	1	0	3	1	0	2	0	1	8

Sheet E	1	2	3	4	5	6	7	8	Final
South Korea (Jang/Choe)	0	0	1	0	0	0	X	X	1
Switzerland (Perret/Rios)	1	1	0	4	1	1	X	X	8

==== Draw 13 ====
Saturday, December 8, 12:00

Sheet B	1	2	3	4	5	6	7	8	Final
Canada (Park/Morris)	4	0	0	1	0	0	3	0	8
South Korea (Jang/Choe)	0	1	1	0	1	2	0	1	6

Sheet C	1	2	3	4	5	6	7	8	Final
Switzerland (Perret/Rios)	0	1	1	0	2	2	0	0	6
Sweden (Wengdel/Wingfors)	1	0	0	2	0	0	1	1	5

==== Draw 14 ====
Saturday, December 8, 16:00

Sheet C	1	2	3	4	5	6	7	8	Final
United States (Peterson/Polo)	0	0	0	2	1	2	0	3	8
Russia (Moskaleva/Eremin)	3	1	1	0	0	0	1	0	6

Sheet D	1	2	3	4	5	6	7	8	Final
Norway (Skaslien/Nedregotten)	1	1	0	1	0	2	0	1	6
China (Wang/Ba)	0	0	1	0	2	0	2	0	5

=== Final ===
Sunday, December 9, 08:30

Team	1	2	3	4	5	6	7	8	Final
Switzerland (Perret/Rios)	4	0	0	0	0	1	0	X	5
Norway (Skaslien/Nedregotten)	0	2	1	2	1	0	4	X	10

Player percentages
Switzerland		Norway	
Jenny Perret	63%	Kristin Skaslien	80%
Martin Rios	69%	Magnus Nedregotten	89%
Total	67%	Total	86%
