= Zou Qiang =

Chinese curler

- Curler
- Born: August 13, 1991 (age 35); Yichun, Heilongjiang, China

Team
- Mixed doubles partner: Han Yu

Curling career
- Member Association: China
- World Championship: 4 (2017, 2018, 2019, 2021)
- Pacific-Asia Championship: 5 (2014, 2016, 2017, 2018, 2019)
- Pan Continental Championship: 1 (2023)
- Olympic: 1 (2022)
Medal record
Men's curling
Representing China
Pacific-Asia Curling Championships
Gold medal – first place	2014 Karuizawa
Silver medal – second place	2016 Uiseong
Silver medal – second place	2017 Erina
Silver medal – second place	2018 Gangneung
Bronze medal – third place	2019 Shenzhen
Asian Winter Games
Gold medal – first place	2017 Sapporo
Pacific-Asia Junior Curling Championships
Gold medal – first place	2013 Tokoro

Zou Qiang (Chinese: 邹强; born August 13, 1991 in Yichun) is a Chinese curler from Harbin.

== Career ==
=== Juniors ===
Zou skipped the Chinese team (which also consisted of Shao Zhilin, Zhang Tianyu and Liang Shuming), at the 2013 Pacific-Asia Junior Curling Championships to a gold medal. The team went 7-1 after the double round robin portion of the tournament, which put them in first place, and a bye to the final, where they faced off against South Korea. They defeated the Koreans (skipped by Kim Jeong-min) 7-5 in the final.

=== Men's ===
Zou joined the Zang Jialiang team as lead in 2014 for one competitive season. The team won the gold medal at the 2014 Pacific-Asia Curling Championships. Zou was left off the team when they played in the 2015 World Championships.

Zou then joined the Liu Rui rink at second. The team won a silver medal at the 2016 Pacific-Asia Curling Championships. Later that season, Zou became the team's alternate. They would win a gold medal at the 2017 Asian Winter Games and finish fifth at the 2017 Ford World Men's Curling Championship (Zou would not play in any games at either tournament). The following season Zou joined the Zou Dejia team at third. They won a silver medal at the 2017 Pacific-Asia Curling Championships and finished 12th at the 2018 World Men's Curling Championship.

In 2018, Zou was promoted to skip of the Chinese men's team. His first international tournament as a skip came at the 2018 Pacific-Asia Curling Championships. There, he led his team of Wang Zhi Yu, Shao Zhilin and Xu Jingtao to an 8–0 round robin record. The team won their semifinal game against South Korea but lost in the final to Japan, settling for silver. Later that season, the Zou skipped the team at the 2019 World Men's Curling Championship and finished with a 2–10 record, in 11th place. Also that season, Zou played in the second leg and final legs of the Curling World Cup. In the second leg, he finished fifth, and in the final leg, he played third on a team skipped by Ba Dexin and lost in the final.

Zou skipped Team China at the 2019 Pacific-Asia Curling Championships. He led his team of Wang, Tian Jiafeng, and Xu to a 7–2 round robin record. Following the round robin, the team lost in the semifinal to Japan but won the bronze medal game against New Zealand. Zou then led China at the 2020 World Qualification Event, which they won, securing China a spot at the cancelled 2020 World Men's Curling Championship. On the World Curling Tour that season, Zou won the 2019 Black Diamond / High River Cash event.

Because of the COVID-19 pandemic, most of the 2020–21 curling season was cancelled. However, the 2021 World Men's Curling Championship took place in a fan-less bubble in Calgary, with the teams qualifying for the 2020 Worlds qualifying for the event. At the 2021 Worlds, Zou led his team of Tian, Wang, and Xu to a last-place finish (14th) with a 2–11 record.

The next season, Zou was selected to be the third on the Chinese men's team for the 2022 Winter Olympics, held in Beijing. The team also included skip Ma Xiuyue, Wang Zhiyu, Xu Jingtao and Jiang Dongxu. Despite not playing a single international competition before the Games, the team fared quite well, finishing the round robin with a 4–5 record. This included defeating higher-seeded teams such as Switzerland's Peter de Cruz, Norway's Steffen Walstad, and Italy's Joël Retornaz. Ultimately, they finished in a four-way tie for fifth place; however, their head to head wins over Switzerland and Norway placed them alone in fifth place at the end of the competition.
