= Wang Zhiyu =

Chinese curler (born 1996)

- Curler
- Born: August 24, 1996 (age 30); Harbin, China

Team
- Curling club: Harbin CC, Harbin, CHN
- Mixed doubles partner: Han Yu

Curling career
- Member Association: China
- World Championship: 3 (2019, 2021, 2025)
- World Mixed Doubles Championship: 1 (2025)
- Pacific-Asia Championship: 2 (2018, 2019)
- Pan Continental Championship: 2 (2023, 2024)
- Olympic: 1 (2022)
- Other appearances: Asian Winter Games: 1 (2025)
Medal record
Men's curling
Representing China
Asian Winter Games
Bronze medal – third place	2025 Harbin	Mixed doubles
Bronze medal – third place	2025 Harbin	Men's
Pan Continental Championships
Gold medal – first place	2024 Lacombe
Pacific-Asia Championships
Silver medal – second place	2018 Gangeung
Bronze medal – third place	2019 Shenzhen

Wang Zhiyu (Chinese: 王智宇; pinyin: Wáng Zhìyǔ; born August 24, 1996, in Harbin) is a Chinese curler.

== Career ==
=== Juniors ===
As a junior curler, Wang threw last rocks for the Chinese junior men's team at the 2017 and 2018 World Junior Curling Championships, skipping the team in 2018. In 2017, Wang, skip Yuan Ming Jie, and front end Li Hong Bo and Kang Xin Long finished with a 2–7 record. In 2018, Wang led his team of Tian Jiafeng, Wang Xiangkun, and Zhang Zezhong to a 3–6 record. The team missed the playoffs in both tournaments.

=== Mens ===
After juniors, Wang joined the Chinese men's national team in 2018, playing third on the team, which was skipped by Zou Qiang. The team first played in the 2018 Pacific-Asia Curling Championships, where they won a silver medal. The team qualified for the 2019 World Men's Curling Championship, finishing with a 2–10 record. Also that season, Wang played in the final leg of the Curling World Cup as second for Ba Dexin. The team lost in the event's final to Canada's Kevin Koe.

Team Zou represented China at the 2019 Pacific-Asia Curling Championships. There, the team finished with a 7–2 round robin record. Following the round robin, the team lost in the semifinal to Japan but won the bronze medal game against New Zealand. The team then had to play in the 2020 World Qualification Event to qualify for the World Championship, which they won. This secured China a spot at the cancelled 2020 World Men's Curling Championship. On the World Curling Tour that season, Team Zou won the 2019 Black Diamond / High River Cash event.

Because of the COVID-19 pandemic, most of the 2020–21 curling season was cancelled. However, the 2021 World Men's Curling Championship took place in a fan-less bubble in Calgary, with the teams qualifying for the 2020 Worlds qualifying for the event. At the 2021 Worlds, the team finished in last place with a 2–11 record.

The next season, Wang was selected to be the second on the Chinese men's team for the 2022 Winter Olympics, held in Beijing. The team also included skip Ma Xiuyue, Zou Qiang, Xu Jingtao and Jiang Dongxu. Despite not playing a single international competition before the Games, the team fared quite well, finishing the round robin with a 4–5 record. This included defeating higher-seeded teams such as Switzerland's Peter de Cruz, Norway's Steffen Walstad, and Italy's Joël Retornaz. Ultimately, they finished in a four-way tie for fifth place; however, their head to head wins over Switzerland and Norway placed them alone in fifth place at the end of the competition.

=== Mixed doubles ===
Wang teamed up with Han Yu to compete in mixed doubles during the 2024–25 curling season. The pair would find immediate success, representing China as the home team at the 2025 Asian Winter Games where they finished 3rd, beating the Philippines 6–5 in the bronze medal game.
