= Xu Jingtao =

Chinese curler (born 1993)

- Curler
- Born: August 5, 1993 (age 33); Harbin, China

Team
- Curling club: Harbin CC, Harbin, CHN
- Skip: Xu Xiaoming
- Third: Fei Xueqing
- Second: Li Zhichao
- Lead: Xu Jingtao
- Alternate: Yang Bohao

Curling career
- Member Association: China
- World Championship: 3 (2018, 2019, 2021)
- Pacific-Asia Championship: 3 (2017, 2018, 2019)
- Pan Continental Championship: 1 (2025)
- Olympic: 2 (2022, 2026)
Medal record
Men's curling
Representing China
Pacific-Asia Curling Championships
Silver medal – second place	2017 Erina
Silver medal – second place	2018 Gangeung
Bronze medal – third place	2019 Shenzhen
Pacific-Asia Junior Curling Championships
Silver medal – second place	2015 Naseby

Xu Jingtao (Chinese: 许静韬; pinyin: Xǔ Jìngtāo; born August 5, 1993, in Harbin) is a Chinese curler. He currently plays lead on the Chinese men's curling team skipped by Xu Xiaoming.

== Career ==
As a junior curler, Xu played lead for the Chinese men's team (skipped by Jiang Dongxu) at the 2013 World Junior Curling Championships, finishing with a 1–8 record. He also played for China (skipped by Wang Jinbo), throwing second rocks at the 2015 Pacific-Asia Junior Curling Championships, picking up a silver medal.

After juniors, Wang joined the Chinese men's national team in 2017, playing second for the team, skipped by Zou Dejia for the 2017–18 season, and then as lead for the 2018–19 season on the team, which was skipped by Zou Qiang. In the 2017–18 season, the team played in the 2017 Pacific-Asia Curling Championships, taking home the silver medal. This qualified the team for the 2018 World Men's Curling Championship, where they finished with a 3–9 record.

For the 2018–19 season, the team first played in the 2018 Pacific-Asia Curling Championships, where they won a silver medal. This qualified them for the 2019 World Men's Curling Championship, where they finished with a 2–10 record. Also that season, Xu played in the second leg and final legs of the Curling World Cup. In the second leg, his team finished fifth, and in the final leg, the team lost in the final to Canada's Kevin Koe.

Team Zou represented China at the 2019 Pacific-Asia Curling Championships. There, the team finished with a 7–2 round robin record. Following the round robin, the team lost in the semifinal to Japan but won the bronze medal game against New Zealand. The team then had to play in the 2020 World Qualification Event to qualify for the World Championship, which they won. This secured China a spot at the cancelled 2020 World Men's Curling Championship. On the World Curling Tour that season, Team Zou won the 2019 Black Diamond / High River Cash event.

Because of the COVID-19 pandemic, most of the 2020–21 curling season was cancelled. However, the 2021 World Men's Curling Championship took place in a fan-less bubble in Calgary, with the teams qualifying for the 2020 Worlds qualifying for the event. At the 2021 Worlds, the team finished in last place with a 2–11 record.

The next season, Xu was selected to be the lead on the Chinese men's team for the 2022 Winter Olympics, held in Beijing. The team also included skip Ma Xiuyue, Zou Qiang, Wang Zhiyu and Jiang Dongxu. Despite not playing a single international competition before the Games, the team fared quite well, finishing the round robin with a 4–5 record. This included defeating higher-seeded teams such as Switzerland's Peter de Cruz, Norway's Steffen Walstad, and Italy's Joël Retornaz. Ultimately, they finished in a four-way tie for fifth place; however, their head to head wins over Switzerland and Norway placed them alone in fifth place at the end of the competition.

== Personal life ==
Xu married Mei Jie, a curler in Chinese Women's Curling National Team in 2022.
