= Tian Jiafeng =

Chinese curler

- Curler ♂
- Born: 16 September 1994 (age 32); Jilin, China

Team
- Curling club: Harbin CC, Harbin
- Skip: Ma Xiuyue
- Third: Zou Qiang
- Second: Wang Zhiyu
- Lead: Tian Jiafeng
- Alternate: Li Zhichao
- Mixed doubles partner: Yang Ying

Curling career
- Member Association: China
- World Championship: 1 (2021)
- World Mixed Doubles Championship: 1 (2024)
- Pacific-Asia Championship: 1 (2019)
- Pan Continental Championship: 1 (2023)
- World Junior Curling Championship: 1 (2018)
Medal record
Curling
Representing China
Pacific-Asia Championships
Bronze medal – third place	2019 Shenzhen

Tian Jiafeng (Chinese: 田佳峰; pinyin: Tián Jiāfēng; born 16 September 1994, in Jilin, China) is a Chinese curler from Changchun.

At the international level, he is a 2019 Pacific-Asia bronze medallist.

== Teams and events ==
=== Men's ===
Season	Skip	Third	Second	Lead	Alternate	Coach	Events
2016–17	Wang Zhiyu	Tian Jiafeng	Wang Xiangkun	Zhang Zezhong			
2017–18	Wang Zhiyu	Tian Jiafeng	Wang Xiangkun	Zhang Zezhong	Guan Tianqi	Li Guangxu	WJCC 2018 (8th)
2018–19	Tian Jiafeng	Han Peng	Wang Xiangkun	Zhang Wen Xin			
2019–20	Zou Qiang	Wang Zhiyu	Tian Jiafeng	Xu Jingtao	Zang Jialiang		
2019–20	Zou Qiang	Wang Zhiyu	Tian Jiafeng	Xu Jingtao	Han Peng	Sören Grahn, Marco Mariani	PACC 2019 (bronze)
2020–21	Zou Qiang	Tian Jiafeng	Wang Zhiyu	Xu Jingtao	Han Peng	Sören Grahn	WCC 2021 (14th)
2023–24	Ma Xiuyue	Zou Qiang	Wang Zhiyu	Tian Jiafeng	Li Zhichao	Liu Rui	PCCC 2023 (9th)

=== Mixed doubles ===
Season	Female	Male	Coach	Events
2016–17	Yan Xue Qi	Tian Jiafeng		
2023–24	Yang Ying	Tian Jiafeng	Zhou Yan	WMDCC 2024 (12th)
2024–25	Yang Ying	Tian Jiafeng		

== Personal life ==
As of 2021, Tian Jiafeng was a full-time curler.

He started curling in 2013 at the age of 19.
