= 2023 Hokkaido Bank Curling Classic =

- Host city: Sapporo, Japan
- Arena: Hokkaido Bank Curling Stadium
- Dates: August 3–6
- Men's winner: (Japan) Team Hirata
- Curling club: Tokoro CC, Tokoro
- Skip: Kohsuke Hirata
- Third: Shingo Usui
- Second: Ryota Meguro
- Lead: Yoshiya Miura
- Alternate: Kosuke Aita
- Coach: Hirofumi Kobayashi
- Finalist: (South Korea) Park Jong-duk
- Women's winner: (Japan) Team Yoshimura
- Curling club: Hokkaido Bank CS, Sapporo
- Skip: Yuna Kotani
- Third: Kaho Onodera
- Second: Anna Ohmiya
- Lead: Mina Kobayashi
- Alternate: Sayaka Yoshimura
- Coach: Yumie Funayama
- Finalist: (Japan) Momoha Tabata

The 2023 Hokkaido Bank Curling Classic was held from August 3 to 6 at the Hokkaido Bank Curling Stadium in Sapporo, Japan. It was the second tour event of the 2023–24 curling season and the first event of the Hokkaido Curling Tour. The total purse for the event was ¥ 1,700,000 on both the men's and women's sides.

In the men's final, Team Kohsuke Hirata of Kitami downed the newly crowned Korean champions Team Park Jong-duk of Gangwon 8–2. Team Hirata, with third Shingo Usui, second Ryota Meguro, lead Yoshiya Miura and alternate Kosuke Aita finished 3–1 through the round robin to qualify for the playoff round. Team Park also went 3–1 in Pool A, however, Team Hirata earned first place in the pool with a 4–2 head-to-head victory. From Pool B, the defending Japanese champions Team Riku Yanagisawa finished 3–1 while Hayato Sato also qualified at 2–2. In the semifinals, Hirata won 6–3 over Sato while Park stole a 6–5 win from Yanagisawa. The Japanese champions went on to win 7–3 in the third-place game over Sato's Sapporo University rink. Earlier in the year, Team Hirata lost the final of the 2023 national championship to Team Yanagisawa 6–2.

In the women's final, Yuna Kotani led the Sayaka Yoshimura rink to their second consecutive Hokkaido Bank title with a perfect 6–0 record. With Yoshimura on maternity leave, Kotani, Kaho Onodera, Anna Ohmiya and Mina Kobayashi each moved up the lineup a position with Yoshimura on the bench. The team went 4–0 through the round robin, topping Pool B. Ikue Kitazawa also went undefeated through Pool A to qualify for the playoffs, with Miori Nakamura and Momoha Tabata rounding out the final four. In the playoffs, Tabata's Hokkaido Bank rink upset Kitazawa's Chubu Electric rink 6–5 while Yoshimura scored two in the eighth end to win 7–6 over Nakamura. Kitazawa went on to win the third-place game 6–0 over Nakamura while Yoshimura dominated the final to win 7–2 over Tabata.

== Men ==
=== Teams ===
The teams are listed as follows:

Skip	Third	Second	Lead	Alternate	Locale
Tetsuro Shimizu (Fourth)	Haruto Ouchi	Shinya Abe (Skip)	Sota Tsuruga	Makoto Tsuruga	Sapporo, Japan
Kohsuke Hirata	Shingo Usui	Ryota Meguro	Yoshiya Miura	Kosuke Aita	Kitami, Japan
Jeong Byeong-jin	Kim Min-woo	Lee Jeong-jae	Kim Tae-hwan		Seoul, South Korea
Lee Jae-beom	Kim Eun-bin	Kim Hyo-jun	Pyo Jeong-min	Kim Jin-hun	Uiseong, South Korea
Takumi Maeda	Asei Nakahara	Hiroki Maeda	Uryu Kamikawa		Kitami, Japan
Yusuke Morozumi	Yuta Matsumura	Ryotaro Shukuya	Masaki Iwai	Kosuke Morozumi	Karuizawa, Japan
Kotaro Noguchi	Yuto Kamada	Hiroshi Kato	Yuki Yoshimura	Hiromasa Yonehara	Sendai, Japan
Park Jong-duk	Jeong Yeong-seok	Oh Seung-hoon	Seong Ji-hoon	Lee Ki-bok	Gangwon, South Korea
Go Aoki (Fourth)	Hayato Sato (Skip)	Kouki Ogiwara	Kazushi Nino	Ayato Sasaki	Sapporo, Japan
Riku Yanagisawa	Tsuyoshi Yamaguchi	Takeru Yamamoto	Satoshi Koizumi		Karuizawa, Japan

=== Round robin standings ===
Final Round Robin Standings

Key
Teams to Playoffs

Pool A	W	L	W–L	PF	PA	DSC
(Japan) Kohsuke Hirata	3	1	1–0	26	10	20.66
(South Korea) Park Jong-duk	3	1	0–1	23	19	59.90
(Japan) Shinya Abe	2	2	–	22	17	42.20
(Japan) Yusuke Morozumi	1	3	1–0	15	31	43.74
(South Korea) Lee Jae-beom	1	3	0–1	18	27	54.06

Pool B	W	L	W–L	PF	PA	DSC
(Japan) Riku Yanagisawa	3	1	–	29	13	23.50
(Japan) Hayato Sato	2	2	1–1	18	22	30.44
(South Korea) Jeong Byeong-jin	2	2	1–1	23	17	46.43
(Japan) Takumi Maeda	2	2	1–1	19	27	101.06
(Japan) Kotaro Noguchi	1	3	–	17	27	69.11

=== Round robin results ===
All draw times are listed in Japan Standard Time (UTC+09:00).

==== Draw 1 ====
Thursday, August 3, 10:30 am

Sheet B	1	2	3	4	5	6	7	8	Final
(Japan) Shinya Abe	0	1	0	1	1	1	0	1	5
(South Korea) Park Jong-duk 🔨	2	0	1	0	0	0	3	0	6

Sheet C	1	2	3	4	5	6	7	8	Final
(Japan) Riku Yanagisawa 🔨	0	1	2	0	1	1	3	X	8
(Japan) Hayato Sato	0	0	0	1	0	0	0	X	1

Sheet D	1	2	3	4	5	6	7	8	Final
(South Korea) Jeong Byeong-jin 🔨	0	0	0	2	0	1	0	0	3
(Japan) Kotaro Noguchi	0	1	1	0	1	0	2	1	6

Sheet E	1	2	3	4	5	6	7	8	Final
(South Korea) Lee Jae-beom	0	0	0	0	0	2	X	X	2
(Japan) Kohsuke Hirata 🔨	0	4	1	1	2	0	X	X	8

==== Draw 3 ====
Friday, August 4, 9:00 am

Sheet B	1	2	3	4	5	6	7	8	Final
(Japan) Kotaro Noguchi	0	1	0	0	0	2	0	X	3
(Japan) Hayato Sato 🔨	2	0	0	2	1	0	2	X	7

Sheet C	1	2	3	4	5	6	7	8	Final
(South Korea) Jeong Byeong-jin 🔨	3	1	0	3	2	1	X	X	10
(Japan) Takumi Maeda	0	0	1	0	0	0	X	X	1

Sheet D	1	2	3	4	5	6	7	8	Final
(South Korea) Park Jong-duk	0	4	0	0	0	4	0	X	8
(South Korea) Lee Jae-beom 🔨	1	0	0	0	2	0	1	X	4

Sheet E	1	2	3	4	5	6	7	8	Final
(Japan) Yusuke Morozumi 🔨	0	0	1	0	0	1	0	X	2
(Japan) Shinya Abe	2	1	0	1	2	0	1	X	7

==== Draw 5 ====
Friday, August 4, 4:00 pm

Sheet B	1	2	3	4	5	6	7	8	Final
(Japan) Takumi Maeda	0	1	0	2	0	0	0	X	3
(Japan) Riku Yanagisawa 🔨	2	0	1	0	2	3	1	X	9

Sheet C	1	2	3	4	5	6	7	8	Final
(South Korea) Park Jong-duk 🔨	2	0	0	0	3	0	2	0	7
(Japan) Yusuke Morozumi	0	1	0	3	0	1	0	1	6

Sheet D	1	2	3	4	5	6	7	8	Final
(Japan) Kohsuke Hirata	0	0	1	0	0	1	0	X	2
(Japan) Shinya Abe 🔨	0	1	0	1	2	0	1	X	5

Sheet E	1	2	3	4	5	6	7	8	Final
(Japan) Hayato Sato 🔨	1	0	1	0	0	1	1	2	6
(South Korea) Jeong Byeong-jin	0	1	0	3	1	0	0	0	5

==== Draw 7 ====
Saturday, August 5, 9:00 am

Sheet B	1	2	3	4	5	6	7	8	Final
(Japan) Yusuke Morozumi	0	1	0	0	0	X	X	X	1
(Japan) Kohsuke Hirata 🔨	2	0	3	2	5	X	X	X	12

Sheet C	1	2	3	4	5	6	7	8	Final
(Japan) Shinya Abe	0	0	1	1	0	2	1	X	5
(South Korea) Lee Jae-beom 🔨	1	3	0	0	3	0	0	X	7

Sheet D	1	2	3	4	5	6	7	8	Final
(Japan) Hayato Sato 🔨	0	3	0	1	0	0	0	0	4
(Japan) Takumi Maeda	0	0	3	0	0	2	0	1	6

Sheet E	1	2	3	4	5	6	7	8	Final
(Japan) Kotaro Noguchi 🔨	2	0	0	1	0	1	0	0	4
(Japan) Riku Yanagisawa	0	2	0	0	2	0	1	3	8

==== Draw 9 ====
Saturday, August 5, 4:00 pm

Sheet B	1	2	3	4	5	6	7	8	9	Final
(Japan) Riku Yanagisawa	1	0	1	0	0	0	2	0	0	4
(South Korea) Jeong Byeong-jin 🔨	0	1	0	0	1	0	0	2	1	5

Sheet C	1	2	3	4	5	6	7	8	Final
(Japan) Takumi Maeda	2	0	3	1	1	0	2	X	9
(Japan) Kotaro Noguchi 🔨	0	2	0	0	0	2	0	X	4

Sheet D	1	2	3	4	5	6	7	8	Final
(South Korea) Lee Jae-beom	0	2	0	0	2	0	1	0	5
(Japan) Yusuke Morozumi 🔨	2	0	2	0	0	1	0	1	6

Sheet E	1	2	3	4	5	6	7	8	Final
(Japan) Kohsuke Hirata 🔨	1	0	0	0	2	0	0	1	4
(South Korea) Park Jong-duk	0	0	0	1	0	1	0	0	2

=== Playoffs ===
Semifinals
A1	(Japan) Kohsuke Hirata	6
B2	(Japan) Hayato Sato	3
B1	(Japan) Riku Yanagisawa	5
A2	(South Korea) Park Jong-duk	6

Final
A1	(Japan) Kohsuke Hirata	8
A2	(South Korea) Park Jong-duk	2
Third place game
B2	(Japan) Hayato Sato	3
B1	(Japan) Riku Yanagisawa	7

==== Semifinals ====
Sunday, August 6, 9:00 am

Sheet C	1	2	3	4	5	6	7	8	Final
(Japan) Kohsuke Hirata	0	2	0	1	0	0	1	2	6
(Japan) Hayato Sato 🔨	2	0	0	0	0	1	0	0	3

Sheet E	1	2	3	4	5	6	7	8	Final
(Japan) Riku Yanagisawa	0	0	0	0	5	0	0	0	5
(South Korea) Park Jong-duk 🔨	0	0	2	0	0	2	1	1	6

==== Third place game ====
Sunday, August 6, 12:30 pm

Sheet B	1	2	3	4	5	6	7	8	Final
(Japan) Hayato Sato	1	0	0	1	0	1	0	0	3
(Japan) Riku Yanagisawa 🔨	0	1	0	0	3	0	1	2	7

==== Final ====
Sunday, August 6, 4:00 pm

Sheet B	1	2	3	4	5	6	7	8	Final
(Japan) Kohsuke Hirata 🔨	2	2	0	2	0	2	X	X	8
(South Korea) Park Jong-duk	0	0	1	0	1	0	X	X	2

== Women ==
=== Teams ===
The teams are listed as follows:

Skip	Third	Second	Lead	Alternate	Locale
Miyu Ueno (Fourth)	Yui Ueno	Junko Nishimuro	Asuka Kanai (Skip)	Mone Ryokawa	Karuizawa, Japan
Kim Su-hyeon	Jeong Min-jae	Ahn Jeong-yeon	Kang Min-hyo		Uiseong, South Korea
Ikue Kitazawa	Seina Nakajima	Minori Suzuki	Hasumi Ishigooka	Ami Enami	Nagano, Japan
Mayu Minami	Kana Ogawa	Mizuki Saito	Moe Nomoto	Mika Okuyama	Sapporo, Japan
Yuina Miura	Ai Matsunaga	Yuna Sakuma	Yuna Takahashi		Nayoro, Japan
Misaki Tanaka (Fourth)	Miori Nakamura (Skip)	Haruka Kihara	Hiyori Ichinohe	Yuuna Harada	Aomori, Japan
Park You-been	Lee Eun-chae	Yang Seung-hee	Kim Ji-yoon		Seoul, South Korea
Honoka Sasaki	Mari Motohashi	Miki Hayashi	Mayumi Saito	Yako Matsuzawa	Kitami, Japan
Momoha Tabata	Miku Nihira	Sae Yamamoto	Mikoto Nakajima	Ayami Ito	Sapporo, Japan
Yuna Kotani (Note: As skip Sayaka Yoshimura was on maternity leave, the rest of the team moved up the lineup a position. Yoshimura was listed as the alternate on the roster, however.)	Kaho Onodera	Anna Ohmiya	Mina Kobayashi	Sayaka Yoshimura	Sapporo, Japan

=== Round robin standings ===
Final Round Robin Standings

Key
Teams to Playoffs

Pool A	W	L	PF	PA	DSC
(Japan) Ikue Kitazawa	4	0	34	14	56.11
(Japan) Miori Nakamura	3	1	24	19	53.27
(South Korea) Kim Su-hyeon	2	2	20	22	43.27
(Japan) Honoka Sasaki	1	3	16	24	37.66
(Japan) Mayu Minami	0	4	13	28	54.06

Pool B	W	L	PF	PA	DSC
(Japan) Team Yoshimura	4	0	26	16	29.97
(Japan) Momoha Tabata	3	1	32	14	42.81
(Japan) Asuka Kanai	2	2	15	26	52.63
(South Korea) Park You-been	1	3	22	25	72.80
(Japan) Yuina Miura	0	4	12	26	92.00

=== Round robin results ===
All draw times are listed in Japan Standard Time (UTC+09:00).

==== Draw 2 ====
Thursday, August 3, 2:00 pm

Sheet B	1	2	3	4	5	6	7	8	Final
(Japan) Honoka Sasaki 🔨	2	0	0	2	0	2	0	X	6
(Japan) Mayu Minami	0	0	1	0	1	0	1	X	3

Sheet C	1	2	3	4	5	6	7	8	Final
(Japan) Team Yoshimura	0	0	3	1	0	2	1	X	7
(Japan) Asuka Kanai 🔨	0	1	0	0	1	0	0	X	2

Sheet D	1	2	3	4	5	6	7	8	Final
(Japan) Yuina Miura	0	2	0	0	0	0	1	X	3
(South Korea) Park You-been 🔨	1	0	3	1	1	0	3	X	9

Sheet E	1	2	3	4	5	6	7	8	Final
(South Korea) Kim Su-hyeon 🔨	1	0	0	1	2	0	0	X	4
(Japan) Ikue Kitazawa	0	2	2	0	0	2	4	X	10

==== Draw 4 ====
Friday, August 4, 12:30 pm

Sheet B	1	2	3	4	5	6	7	8	Final
(South Korea) Park You-been	0	0	2	0	1	0	0	X	3
(Japan) Asuka Kanai 🔨	0	1	0	2	0	3	1	X	7

Sheet C	1	2	3	4	5	6	7	8	Final
(Japan) Yuina Miura	0	0	1	0	0	0	1	X	2
(Japan) Momoha Tabata 🔨	1	0	0	3	1	2	0	X	7

Sheet D	1	2	3	4	5	6	7	8	Final
(Japan) Mayu Minami 🔨	1	1	0	0	0	0	X	X	2
(South Korea) Kim Su-hyeon	0	0	2	2	1	2	X	X	7

Sheet E	1	2	3	4	5	6	7	8	Final
(Japan) Miori Nakamura	0	1	0	1	0	3	0	1	6
(Japan) Honoka Sasaki 🔨	0	0	2	0	2	0	1	0	5

==== Draw 6 ====
Friday, August 4, 7:30 pm

Sheet B	1	2	3	4	5	6	7	8	Final
(Japan) Momoha Tabata	0	0	0	1	3	0	0	1	5
(Japan) Team Yoshimura 🔨	1	2	1	0	0	2	1	0	7

Sheet C	1	2	3	4	5	6	7	8	Final
(Japan) Mayu Minami	0	1	0	2	0	0	1	0	4
(Japan) Miori Nakamura 🔨	0	0	1	0	1	3	0	2	7

Sheet D	1	2	3	4	5	6	7	8	Final
(Japan) Ikue Kitazawa	3	1	0	0	2	0	3	X	9
(Japan) Honoka Sasaki 🔨	0	0	1	0	0	1	0	X	2

Sheet E	1	2	3	4	5	6	7	8	Final
(Japan) Asuka Kanai 🔨	0	0	1	2	0	1	1	0	5
(Japan) Yuina Miura	0	1	0	0	2	0	0	1	4

==== Draw 8 ====
Saturday, August 5, 12:30 pm

Sheet B	1	2	3	4	5	6	7	8	Final
(Japan) Miori Nakamura	0	2	0	0	2	0	0	X	4
(Japan) Ikue Kitazawa 🔨	1	0	2	1	0	2	1	X	7

Sheet C	1	2	3	4	5	6	7	8	Final
(Japan) Honoka Sasaki	0	0	0	0	1	0	2	X	3
(South Korea) Kim Su-hyeon 🔨	1	1	1	1	0	2	0	X	6

Sheet D	1	2	3	4	5	6	7	8	Final
(Japan) Asuka Kanai	0	1	0	0	0	0	X	X	1
(Japan) Momoha Tabata 🔨	2	0	2	1	3	4	X	X	12

Sheet E	1	2	3	4	5	6	7	8	Final
(South Korea) Park You-been	0	0	2	0	0	0	2	2	6
(Japan) Team Yoshimura 🔨	0	1	0	1	3	2	0	0	7

==== Draw 10 ====
Saturday, August 5, 7:30 pm

Sheet B	1	2	3	4	5	6	7	8	Final
(Japan) Team Yoshimura 🔨	0	2	2	0	1	0	0	X	5
(Japan) Yuina Miura	0	0	0	1	0	1	1	X	3

Sheet C	1	2	3	4	5	6	7	8	Final
(Japan) Momoha Tabata 🔨	0	1	0	3	0	2	0	2	8
(South Korea) Park You-been	0	0	1	0	0	0	3	0	4

Sheet D	1	2	3	4	5	6	7	8	Final
(South Korea) Kim Su-hyeon	0	0	1	0	2	0	0	X	3
(Japan) Miori Nakamura 🔨	0	2	0	2	0	2	1	X	7

Sheet E	1	2	3	4	5	6	7	8	Final
(Japan) Ikue Kitazawa 🔨	2	0	2	0	2	0	2	X	8
(Japan) Mayu Minami	0	2	0	1	0	1	0	X	4

=== Playoffs ===
Semifinals
A1	(Japan) Ikue Kitazawa	5
B2	(Japan) Momoha Tabata	6
B1	(Japan) Team Yoshimura	7
A2	(Japan) Miori Nakamura	6

Final
B2	(Japan) Momoha Tabata	2
B1	(Japan) Team Yoshimura	7
Third place game
A1	(Japan) Ikue Kitazawa	6
A2	(Japan) Miori Nakamura	0

==== Semifinals ====
Sunday, August 6, 9:00 am

Sheet B	1	2	3	4	5	6	7	8	Final
(Japan) Ikue Kitazawa	0	0	2	0	2	0	1	0	5
(Japan) Momoha Tabata 🔨	2	1	0	1	0	1	0	1	6

Sheet D	1	2	3	4	5	6	7	8	Final
(Japan) Team Yoshimura	0	2	1	0	1	1	0	2	7
(Japan) Miori Nakamura 🔨	2	0	0	3	0	0	1	0	6

==== Third place game ====
Sunday, August 6, 12:30 pm

Sheet C	1	2	3	4	5	6	7	8	Final
(Japan) Ikue Kitazawa 🔨	1	2	0	1	1	1	X	X	6
(Japan) Miori Nakamura	0	0	0	0	0	0	X	X	0

==== Final ====
Sunday, August 6, 4:00 pm

Sheet C	1	2	3	4	5	6	7	8	Final
(Japan) Momoha Tabata	0	0	0	0	1	1	0	X	2
(Japan) Team Yoshimura 🔨	0	2	1	3	0	0	1	X	7
