= 2026 Hokkaido Bank Curling Classic =

- Host city: Sapporo, Japan
- Arena: Hokkaido Bank Curling Stadium
- Dates: August 20–23
- Men's winner: (Hokkaido) Team Maeda
- Curling club: Tokoro CC, Tokoro
- Skip: Takumi Maeda
- Third: Hiroki Maeda
- Second: Uryu Kamikawa
- Lead: Gakuto Tokoro
- Coach: Ryoji Onodera; Mari Motohashi
- Finalist: (Nagano Prefecture) Tsuyoshi Yamaguchi
- Women's winner: (Hokkaido) Team Nihira
- Curling club: Sapporo CC, Sapporo
- Skip: Miku Nihira
- Third: Momoha Tabata
- Second: Sae Yamamoto
- Lead: Mikoto Nakajima
- Coach: Masaki Iwai
- Finalist: (Hokkaido) Team Tanaka

The 2026 Hokkaido Bank Curling Classic was held from August 20 to 23 at the Hokkaido Bank Curling Stadium in Sapporo, Japan. It was the first event of the 2026–27 Hokkaido Curling Tour. The total purse for the event is ¥ 1,720,000 on both the men's and women's sides.

On the men's side, Tokoro's Takumi Maeda downed Nagano's Tsuyoshi Yamagichi 9–2 in the final while Kitami's Kohsuke Hirata beat Sapporo's Shinya Abe 4–1 to secure third place. In the women's division, Miku Nihira topped Team Moka Tanaka, skipped by Kotone Suzuki, 5–4 in a battle of Sapporo rinks while Korea's Park You-been won 10–3 against Sapporo's Mina Kobayashi in the third place game.

== Men ==
=== Teams ===
The teams are listed as follows:

Skip	Third	Second	Lead	Alternate	Locale
Tetsuro Shimizu (Fourth)	Shinya Abe (Skip)	Haruto Ouchi	Hayato Sato	Asei Nakahara	(Hokkaido) Sapporo
Kaito Fujii	Miki Yamamoto	Konosuke Takahashi	Shunsuke Kanagawa	Ruki Yokoyama	(Nagano Prefecture) Karuizawa
Go Aoki (Fourth)	Shingo Usui	Takeshi Aoyanagi	Kohsuke Hirata (Skip)	Ryota Meguro	(Hokkaido) Kitami
Takuma Makanae (Fourth)	Sota Jutori (Skip)	Masaki Kudo	Masaki Ishikawa	Keisuke Akutagawa	(Hokkaido) Sapporo
Yutaro Kasai	Miu Sato	Taisei Tsukamoto	Kentaro Shibaya	Kenji Takamatsu	(Hokkaido) Wakkanai
Takumi Maeda	Hiroki Maeda	Uryu Kamikawa	Gakuto Tokoro		(Hokkaido) Tokoro
Ryo Ogihara	Hayato Ueno	Keito Sanuki	Daisuke Sonoyama		(Nagano Prefecture) Karuizawa
Kouki Ogiwara	Hinata Michitani	Chikara Segawa	Taiki Kudo	Shunta Kobayashi	(Hokkaido) Sapporo
P. N. Raju	Tucker Hellman	Carter Hellman	Kenneth Doan		(India) Hyderabad
Riku Yanagisawa (Fourth)	Tsuyoshi Yamaguchi (Skip)	Takeru Yamamoto	Satoshi Koizumi		(Nagano Prefecture) Karuizawa

=== Round robin standings ===
Final Round Robin Standings

Key
Teams to Playoffs

Pool A	W	L	W–L	PF	PA	DSC
(Hokkaido) Kohsuke Hirata	4	0	–	29	12	30.3
(Nagano Prefecture) Tsuyoshi Yamaguchi	3	1	–	35	17	25.1
(Nagano Prefecture) Kaito Fujii	2	2	–	26	18	42.2
(Hokkaido) Yutaro Kasai	1	3	–	13	37	68.7
(Nagano Prefecture) Ryo Ogihara	0	4	–	14	33	43.7

Pool B	W	L	W–L	PF	PA	DSC
(Hokkaido) Shinya Abe	4	0	–	29	15	55.8
(Hokkaido) Takumi Maeda	3	1	–	27	19	33.9
(Hokkaido) Kouki Ogiwara	2	2	–	25	24	76.6
(Hokkaido) Sota Jutori	1	3	–	20	32	105.0
(India) P. N. Raju	0	4	–	17	28	73.2

=== Round robin results ===
All draw times are listed in Japan Standard Time (UTC+09:00).

==== Draw 1 ====
Thursday, August 20, 10:30 am

Sheet C	1	2	3	4	5	6	7	8	Final
(Nagano Prefecture) Tsuyoshi Yamaguchi 🔨	2	0	2	2	0	7	X	X	13
(Nagano Prefecture) Ryo Ogihara	0	2	0	0	1	0	X	X	3

Sheet E	1	2	3	4	5	6	7	8	Final
(Hokkaido) Yutaro Kasai	0	0	2	0	1	1	0	X	4
(Nagano Prefecture) Kaito Fujii 🔨	3	3	0	3	0	0	4	X	13

==== Draw 2 ====
Thursday, August 20, 2:00 pm

Sheet C	1	2	3	4	5	6	7	8	Final
(Hokkaido) Kouki Ogiwara 🔨	0	2	0	2	0	2	0	X	6
(India) P. N. Raju	0	0	0	0	1	0	3	X	4

Sheet E	1	2	3	4	5	6	7	8	Final
(Hokkaido) Takumi Maeda 🔨	3	0	0	3	1	1	0	X	8
(Hokkaido) Sota Jutori	0	0	1	0	0	0	1	X	2

==== Draw 3 ====
Friday, August 21, 9:00 am

Sheet C	1	2	3	4	5	6	7	8	Final
(Hokkaido) Yutaro Kasai	0	0	0	1	0	1	0	X	2
(Hokkaido) Kohsuke Hirata 🔨	0	0	2	0	1	0	3	X	6

Sheet D	1	2	3	4	5	6	7	8	Final
(Nagano Prefecture) Kaito Fujii	1	0	1	1	1	0	2	X	6
(Nagano Prefecture) Ryo Ogihara 🔨	0	1	0	0	0	2	0	X	3

==== Draw 4 ====
Friday, August 21, 12:30 pm

Sheet B	1	2	3	4	5	6	7	8	Final
(Hokkaido) Sota Jutori	1	0	2	0	0	0	2	0	5
(Hokkaido) Kouki Ogiwara 🔨	0	2	0	3	0	1	0	1	7

Sheet E	1	2	3	4	5	6	7	8	Final
(India) P. N. Raju	0	0	1	0	1	0	1	X	3
(Hokkaido) Shinya Abe 🔨	0	2	0	2	0	2	0	X	6

==== Draw 5 ====
Friday, August 21, 4:00 pm

Sheet B	1	2	3	4	5	6	7	8	Final
(Nagano Prefecture) Ryo Ogihara 🔨	2	0	0	0	1	0	1	0	4
(Hokkaido) Yutaro Kasai	0	1	1	1	0	1	0	1	5

Sheet E	1	2	3	4	5	6	7	8	Final
(Hokkaido) Kohsuke Hirata	3	0	1	0	0	2	3	X	9
(Nagano Prefecture) Tsuyoshi Yamaguchi 🔨	0	1	0	0	1	0	0	X	2

==== Draw 6 ====
Friday, August 21, 7:30 pm

Sheet C	1	2	3	4	5	6	7	8	Final
(Hokkaido) Shinya Abe	0	0	1	1	2	1	5	X	10
(Hokkaido) Sota Jutori 🔨	3	1	0	0	0	0	0	X	4

Sheet D	1	2	3	4	5	6	7	8	9	Final
(Hokkaido) Kouki Ogiwara	1	0	3	0	2	0	0	1	0	7
(Hokkaido) Takumi Maeda 🔨	0	3	0	2	0	2	0	0	2	9

==== Draw 7 ====
Saturday, August 22, 9:00 am

Sheet B	1	2	3	4	5	6	7	8	9	Final
(Hokkaido) Kohsuke Hirata	1	2	0	0	0	1	0	0	1	5
(Nagano Prefecture) Kaito Fujii 🔨	0	0	1	2	0	0	0	1	0	4

Sheet D	1	2	3	4	5	6	7	8	Final
(Nagano Prefecture) Tsuyoshi Yamaguchi 🔨	1	2	0	3	5	3	X	X	14
(Hokkaido) Yutaro Kasai	0	0	2	0	0	0	X	X	2

==== Draw 8 ====
Saturday, August 22, 12:30 pm

Sheet B	1	2	3	4	5	6	7	8	Final
(Hokkaido) Takumi Maeda 🔨	0	0	1	0	1	1	0	X	3
(Hokkaido) Shinya Abe	1	2	0	3	0	0	1	X	7

Sheet D	1	2	3	4	5	6	7	8	Final
(Hokkaido) Sota Jutori	1	0	0	5	0	1	2	X	9
(India) P. N. Raju 🔨	0	2	2	0	3	0	0	X	7

==== Draw 9 ====
Saturday, August 22, 4:00 pm

Sheet C	1	2	3	4	5	6	7	8	Final
(Nagano Prefecture) Kaito Fujii	0	1	0	0	0	0	2	X	3
(Nagano Prefecture) Tsuyoshi Yamaguchi 🔨	1	0	2	0	1	2	0	X	6

Sheet E	1	2	3	4	5	6	7	8	Final
(Nagano Prefecture) Ryo Ogihara	1	0	1	2	0	0	0	X	4
(Hokkaido) Kohsuke Hirata 🔨	0	2	0	0	0	4	3	X	9

==== Draw 10 ====
Saturday, August 22, 7:30 pm

Sheet C	1	2	3	4	5	6	7	8	Final
(India) P. N. Raju 🔨	0	1	0	2	0	0	0	X	3
(Hokkaido) Takumi Maeda	2	0	1	0	2	1	1	X	7

Sheet D	1	2	3	4	5	6	7	8	Final
(Hokkaido) Shinya Abe 🔨	2	0	1	0	0	2	0	1	6
(Hokkaido) Kouki Ogiwara	0	1	0	1	2	0	1	0	5

=== Playoffs ===
Semifinals
A1	(Hokkaido) Kohsuke Hirata	3
B2	(Hokkaido) Takumi Maeda	6
B1	(Hokkaido) Shinya Abe	6
A2	(Nagano Prefecture) Tsuyoshi Yamaguchi	7

Final
B2	(Hokkaido) Takumi Maeda	9
A2	(Nagano Prefecture) Tsuyoshi Yamaguchi	2
Third place game
A1	(Hokkaido) Kohsuke Hirata	4
B1	(Hokkaido) Shinya Abe	1

==== Semifinals ====
Sunday, August 23, 9:00 am

Sheet B	1	2	3	4	5	6	7	8	Final
(Hokkaido) Kohsuke Hirata 🔨	1	0	0	0	1	0	1	0	3
(Hokkaido) Takumi Maeda	0	0	2	1	0	2	0	1	6

Sheet D	1	2	3	4	5	6	7	8	Final
(Hokkaido) Shinya Abe 🔨	2	0	0	0	2	0	2	0	6
(Nagano Prefecture) Tsuyoshi Yamaguchi	0	0	2	1	0	3	0	1	7

==== Third place game ====
Sunday, August 23, 12:30 pm

Sheet E	1	2	3	4	5	6	7	8	Final
(Hokkaido) Kohsuke Hirata 🔨	1	0	0	0	1	1	1	X	4
(Hokkaido) Shinya Abe	0	1	0	0	0	0	0	X	1

==== Final ====
Sunday, August 23, 12:30 pm

Sheet C	1	2	3	4	5	6	7	8	Final
(Hokkaido) Takumi Maeda 🔨	1	4	0	0	3	1	X	X	9
(Nagano Prefecture) Tsuyoshi Yamaguchi	0	0	2	0	0	0	X	X	2

== Women ==
=== Teams ===
The teams are listed as follows:

Skip	Third	Second	Lead	Alternate	Locale
Satsuki Fujisawa	Yako Matsuzawa	– (Note: Team Fujisawa played with three players.)	Yumi Suzuki		(Hokkaido) Kitami
Kim Eun-jung	Park Han-byul	Bang Yu-jin	Kim Hae-jeong	Kim Su-hyeon	(South Korea) Uiseong
Ikue Kitazawa	Seina Nakajima	Minori Suzuki	Hasumi Ishigooka	Chiaki Matsumura	(Nagano Prefecture) Nagano
Mina Kobayashi	Kaho Onodera	Yuna Kotani	Anna Ohmiya		(Hokkaido) Sapporo
Yuina Miura	Kohane Tsuruga	Rin Suzuki	Aone Nakamura	Minami Chiba	(Hokkaido) Sapporo
Miku Nihira	Momoha Tabata	Sae Yamamoto	Mikoto Nakajima		(Hokkaido) Sapporo
Park You-been	Park Seo-jin	Yang Tae-i	Kim Su-jin		(South Korea) Chuncheon
Kotoka Segawa	Suzune Yasui	Yuna Sakuma	Aira Inada	Yumeka Mori	(Hokkaido) Sapporo
Kotone Suzuki (Note: Kotone Suzuki skipped the team in the absence of Moka Tanaka.)	Akari Hashimoto	Minami Nakao	Hana Ikeda		(Hokkaido) Sapporo
Miyu Ueno	Yui Ueno	– (Note: Team Ueno played with three players.)	Asuka Kanai		(Nagano Prefecture) Karuizawa

=== Round robin standings ===
Final Round Robin Standings

Key
Teams to Playoffs

Pool A	W	L	W–L	PF	PA	DSC
(Hokkaido) Team Tanaka	3	1	–	22	21	38.7
(South Korea) Park You-been	2	2	2–0	22	19	41.1
(Hokkaido) Yuina Miura	2	2	1–1	27	22	23.3
(Nagano Prefecture) Ikue Kitazawa	2	2	0–2	23	25	44.6
(Hokkaido) Satsuki Fujisawa	1	3	–	16	23	30.2

Pool B	W	L	W–L	PF	PA	DSC
(Hokkaido) Miku Nihira	4	0	–	26	16	23.9
(Hokkaido) Mina Kobayashi	2	2	1–0	20	20	26.5
(Hokkaido) Kotoka Segawa	2	2	0–1	17	18	74.4
(Nagano Prefecture) Miyu Ueno	1	3	1–0	19	28	27.2
(South Korea) Kim Eun-jung	1	3	0–1	19	19	40.3

=== Round robin results ===
All draw times are listed in Japan Standard Time (UTC+09:00).

==== Draw 1 ====
Thursday, August 20, 10:30 am

Sheet B	1	2	3	4	5	6	7	8	Final
(Hokkaido) Miku Nihira 🔨	0	2	0	1	0	0	3	0	6
(Hokkaido) Kotoka Segawa	0	0	1	0	2	1	0	1	5

Sheet D	1	2	3	4	5	6	7	8	Final
(South Korea) Kim Eun-jung	1	1	0	3	0	1	0	0	6
(Nagano Prefecture) Miyu Ueno 🔨	0	0	2	0	2	0	2	2	8

==== Draw 2 ====
Thursday, August 20, 2:00 pm

Sheet B	1	2	3	4	5	6	7	8	Final
(South Korea) Park You-been	0	1	0	1	2	1	0	X	5
(Nagano Prefecture) Ikue Kitazawa 🔨	1	0	1	0	0	0	1	X	3

Sheet D	1	2	3	4	5	6	7	8	Final
(Hokkaido) Satsuki Fujisawa 🔨	0	1	1	0	0	2	0	X	4
(Hokkaido) Team Tanaka	0	0	0	2	3	0	2	X	7

==== Draw 3 ====
Friday, August 21, 9:00 am

Sheet B	1	2	3	4	5	6	7	8	Final
(South Korea) Kim Eun-jung 🔨	0	1	2	0	1	0	2	X	6
(Hokkaido) Mina Kobayashi	0	0	0	1	0	1	0	X	2

Sheet E	1	2	3	4	5	6	7	8	9	Final
(Nagano Prefecture) Miyu Ueno	0	2	0	0	1	0	0	2	0	5
(Hokkaido) Kotoka Segawa 🔨	1	0	0	1	0	2	1	0	1	6

==== Draw 4 ====
Friday, August 21, 12:30 pm

Sheet C	1	2	3	4	5	6	7	8	Final
(Hokkaido) Team Tanaka 🔨	2	0	1	0	1	0	2	0	6
(South Korea) Park You-been	0	1	0	2	0	1	0	1	5

Sheet D	1	2	3	4	5	6	7	8	Final
(Nagano Prefecture) Ikue Kitazawa 🔨	0	2	0	3	0	1	0	X	6
(Hokkaido) Yuina Miura	4	0	2	0	2	0	4	X	12

==== Draw 5 ====
Friday, August 21, 4:00 pm

Sheet C	1	2	3	4	5	6	7	8	Final
(Hokkaido) Kotoka Segawa	0	0	1	0	2	1	0	0	4
(South Korea) Kim Eun-jung 🔨	0	1	0	1	0	0	1	0	3

Sheet D	1	2	3	4	5	6	7	8	Final
(Hokkaido) Mina Kobayashi 🔨	0	0	2	0	1	0	3	0	6
(Hokkaido) Miku Nihira	0	0	0	1	0	5	0	1	7

==== Draw 6 ====
Friday, August 21, 7:30 pm

Sheet B	1	2	3	4	5	6	7	8	Final
(Hokkaido) Yuina Miura	0	0	1	0	0	0	2	0	3
(Hokkaido) Team Tanaka 🔨	0	2	0	0	0	1	0	1	4

Sheet E	1	2	3	4	5	6	7	8	Final
(South Korea) Park You-been	0	0	1	0	1	0	2	X	4
(Hokkaido) Satsuki Fujisawa 🔨	2	1	0	1	0	1	0	X	5

==== Draw 7 ====
Saturday, August 22, 9:00 am

Sheet C	1	2	3	4	5	6	7	8	Final
(Hokkaido) Mina Kobayashi	1	0	3	0	2	0	2	X	8
(Nagano Prefecture) Miyu Ueno 🔨	0	1	0	3	0	1	0	X	5

Sheet E	1	2	3	4	5	6	7	8	Final
(Hokkaido) Miku Nihira 🔨	0	2	0	1	0	1	0	1	5
(South Korea) Kim Eun-jung	0	0	2	0	1	0	1	0	4

==== Draw 8 ====
Saturday, August 22, 12:30 pm

Sheet C	1	2	3	4	5	6	7	8	Final
(Hokkaido) Satsuki Fujisawa	0	0	0	0	2	0	2	X	4
(Hokkaido) Yuina Miura 🔨	0	3	1	2	0	1	0	X	7

Sheet E	1	2	3	4	5	6	7	8	9	Final
(Hokkaido) Team Tanaka	0	0	1	0	2	1	0	1	0	5
(Nagano Prefecture) Ikue Kitazawa 🔨	0	2	0	2	0	0	1	0	4	9

==== Draw 9 ====
Saturday, August 22, 4:00 pm

Sheet B	1	2	3	4	5	6	7	8	Final
(Nagano Prefecture) Miyu Ueno 🔨	0	0	0	0	1	0	0	X	1
(Hokkaido) Miku Nihira	0	1	1	1	0	1	4	X	8

Sheet D	1	2	3	4	5	6	7	8	Final
(Hokkaido) Kotoka Segawa	0	0	0	0	0	2	0	0	2
(Hokkaido) Mina Kobayashi 🔨	0	1	0	0	1	0	1	1	4

==== Draw 10 ====
Saturday, August 22, 7:30 pm

Sheet B	1	2	3	4	5	6	7	8	Final
(Nagano Prefecture) Ikue Kitazawa	0	2	0	0	0	0	2	1	5
(Hokkaido) Satsuki Fujisawa 🔨	0	0	0	2	0	1	0	0	3

Sheet E	1	2	3	4	5	6	7	8	9	Final
(Hokkaido) Yuina Miura	0	0	1	0	1	0	2	1	0	5
(South Korea) Park You-been 🔨	0	1	0	2	0	2	0	0	3	8

=== Playoffs ===
Semifinals
A1	(Hokkaido) Team Tanaka	8
B2	(Hokkaido) Mina Kobayashi	7
B1	(Hokkaido) Miku Nihira	9
A2	(South Korea) Park You-been	3

Final
A1	(Hokkaido) Team Tanaka	4
B1	(Hokkaido) Miku Nihira	5
Third place game
B2	(Hokkaido) Mina Kobayashi	3
A2	(South Korea) Park You-been	10

==== Semifinals ====
Sunday, August 23, 9:00 am

Sheet C	1	2	3	4	5	6	7	8	Final
(Hokkaido) Team Tanaka 🔨	1	0	0	1	0	3	0	3	8
(Hokkaido) Mina Kobayashi	0	0	1	0	3	0	3	0	7

Sheet E	1	2	3	4	5	6	7	8	Final
(Hokkaido) Miku Nihira 🔨	3	1	0	1	0	4	X	X	9
(South Korea) Park You-been	0	0	2	0	1	0	X	X	3

==== Third place game ====
Sunday, August 23, 12:30 pm

Sheet B	1	2	3	4	5	6	7	8	Final
(Hokkaido) Mina Kobayashi	0	0	2	0	0	1	X	X	3
(South Korea) Park You-been 🔨	3	2	0	2	3	0	X	X	10

==== Final ====
Sunday, August 23, 12:30 pm

Sheet D	1	2	3	4	5	6	7	8	Final
(Hokkaido) Team Tanaka 🔨	0	0	0	3	0	0	1	0	4
(Hokkaido) Miku Nihira	0	0	2	0	0	2	0	1	5
