= Hokkaido Bank Curling Classic =

- Organizer: Sapporo Curling Association
- Sponsor: Hokkaido Bank
- Established: 2016
- Host city: Sapporo, Japan
- Arena: Hokkaido Bank Curling Stadium
- Website: hokkaidobank-curling.jp
- Men's purse: ¥ 1,720,000
- Women's purse: ¥ 1,720,000

Current champions (2026)
- Men: (Hokkaido) Takumi Maeda
- Women: (Hokkaido) Miku Nihira

Current edition
- 2026 Hokkaido Bank Curling Classic

The Hokkaido Bank Curling Classic is an annual bonspiel on the men's and women's curling tour. It is held annually in early August at the Hokkaido Bank Curling Stadium in Sapporo, Japan. The total purse for the event is ¥ 1,720,000 with the winning team receiving ¥ 1,000,000.

Typically this event allows in-person spectators, but due to COVID-19 restrictions, they weren't permitted in 2021 and 2022. In its place they will be providing streaming from their Hokkaido Bank Curling Classic's channel on YouTube.

The event hosted an international field from 2016 to 2019. Following its cancellation in 2020, only Japanese teams attended the 2021 event. In 2022 and 2023, teams from Japan and South Korea competed. Due to construction in the stadium, the event was not held for the 2024 season.

== Past champions ==
=== Men ===
Year	Winning team	Runner-up team	Purse (¥)
2016	(Canada) Karsten Sturmay, Tristan Steinke, Chris Kennedy, Caleb Boorse	(China) Wang Fengchun, Jiang Dongxu, Yuan Mingjie, Cheng Kuo	850,000
2017	(South Korea) Kim Soo-hyuk, Kim Tae-hwan, Park Jong-duk, Nam Yoon-ho	(Nagano Prefecture) Yusuke Morozumi, Tetsuro Shimizu, Tsuyoshi Yamaguchi, Kosuke Morozumi	1,700,000
2018	(Hokkaido) Go Aoki (Fourth), Masaki Iwai (Skip), Ryotaro Shukuya, Kouki Ogiwara	(Hokkaido) Kohsuke Hirata (Fourth), Shingo Usui (Skip), Daiki Shikano, Yoshiya Miura	1,700,000
2019	(Hokkaido) Yuta Matsumura, Tetsuro Shimizu, Yasumasa Tanida, Shinya Abe	(Canada) Scott McDonald, Jonathan Beuk, Wesley Forget, Scott Chadwick	1,700,000
2020	Cancelled		
2021	(Hokkaido) Yuta Matsumura, Tetsuro Shimizu, Yasumasa Tanida, Shinya Abe	(Nagano Prefecture) Yusuke Morozumi, Masaki Iwai, Ryotaro Shukuya, Kosuke Morozumi	1,700,000
2022	(South Korea) Jeong Byeong-jin, Lee Jeong-jae, Kim Min-woo, Kim Tae-hwan	(Nagano Prefecture) Yusuke Morozumi, Yuta Matsumura, Ryotaro Shukuya, Kosuke Morozumi	1,700,000
2023	(Hokkaido) Kohsuke Hirata, Shingo Usui, Ryota Meguro, Yoshiya Miura, Kosuke Aita	(South Korea) Park Jong-duk, Jeong Yeong-seok, Oh Seung-hoon, Seong Ji-hoon, Lee Ki-bok	1,700,000
2024	Not held		
2025	(Hokkaido) Tetsuro Shimizu (Fourth), Shinya Abe (Skip), Hayato Sato, Haruto Ouchi	(Miyagi Prefecture) Kotaro Noguchi, Yuto Kamada, Hiroshi Kato, Hiromasa Yonehara	1,700,000
2026	(Hokkaido) Takumi Maeda, Hiroki Maeda, Uryu Kamikawa, Gakuto Tokoro	(Nagano Prefecture) Riku Yanagisawa (Fourth), Tsuyoshi Yamaguchi, Takeru Yamamoto, Satoshi Koizumi	1,720,000

=== Women ===
Year	Winning team	Runner-up team	Purse (¥)
2016	(Canada) Chelsea Carey, Amy Nixon, Jocelyn Peterman, Laine Peters	(South Korea) Gim Un-chi, Um Min-ji, Lee Seul-bee, Yeom Yoon-jung	850,000
2017	(Hokkaido) Satsuki Fujisawa, Chinami Yoshida, Yumi Suzuki, Yurika Yoshida	(South Korea) Kim Min-ji, Kim Hye-rin, Yang Tae-i, Kim Su-jin	1,700,000
2018	(South Korea) Kim Min-ji, Kim Hye-rin, Yang Tae-i, Kim Su-jin	(Nagano Prefecture) Chiaki Matsumura, Ikue Kitazawa, Seina Nakajima, Hasumi Ishigooka	1,700,000
2019	(China) Jiang Yilun, Zhang Lijun, Dong Ziqi, Jiang Xindi	(Hokkaido) Satsuki Fujisawa, Chinami Yoshida, Yumi Suzuki, Yurika Yoshida	1,700,000
2020	Cancelled		
2021	(Yamanashi Prefecture) Tori Koana, Yuna Kotani, Mao Ishigaki, Arisa Kotani	(Hokkaido) Satsuki Fujisawa, Chinami Yoshida, Yumi Suzuki, Yurika Yoshida	1,700,000
2022	(Hokkaido) Sayaka Yoshimura, Kaho Onodera, Anna Ohmiya, Mina Kobayashi	(Hokkaido) Mayu Minami, Kana Ogawa, Momo Kaneta, Nao Kyoto	1,700,000
2023	(Hokkaido) Yuna Kotani, Kaho Onodera, Anna Ohmiya, Mina Kobayashi, Sayaka Yoshimura	(Hokkaido) Momoha Tabata, Miku Nihira, Sae Yamamoto, Mikoto Nakajima, Ayami Ito	1,700,000
2024	Not held		
2025	(Hokkaido) Sayaka Yoshimura, Kaho Onodera, Yuna Kotani, Anna Ohmiya, Mina Kobayashi	(Hokkaido) Momoha Tabata (Fourth), Miku Nihira (Skip), Sae Yamamoto, Mikoto Nakajima	1,700,000
2026	(Hokkaido) Miku Nihira, Momoha Tabata, Sae Yamamoto, Mikoto Nakajima	(Hokkaido) Kotone Suzuki, Akari Hashimoto, Minami Nakao, Hana Ikeda	1,720,000
