= 2025 Hokkaido Bank Curling Classic =

- Host city: Sapporo, Japan
- Arena: Hokkaido Bank Curling Stadium
- Dates: August 7–10
- Men's winner: (Hokkaido) Team Abe
- Curling club: Tokoro CC, Tokoro, Hokkaido
- Skip: Shinya Abe
- Fourth: Tetsuro Shimizu
- Second: Hayato Sato
- Lead: Haruto Ouchi
- Alternate: Sota Tsuruga
- Coach: Makoto Tsuruga
- Finalist: (Miyagi Prefecture) Kotaro Noguchi
- Women's winner: (Hokkaido) Team Yoshimura
- Curling club: Sapporo CC, Sapporo, Hokkaido
- Skip: Sayaka Yoshimura
- Third: Kaho Onodera
- Second: Yuna Kotani
- Lead: Anna Ohmiya
- Alternate: Mina Kobayashi
- Coach: Yumie Funayama
- Finalist: (Hokkaido) Momoha Tabata

The 2025 Hokkaido Bank Curling Classic was held from August 7 to 10 at the Hokkaido Bank Curling Stadium in Sapporo, Japan. It was the third tour event of the 2025–26 curling season and the second event of the Hokkaido Curling Tour. The total purse for the event was ¥ 1,700,000 on both the men's and women's sides.

== Men ==
=== Teams ===
The teams are listed as follows:

Skip	Third	Second	Lead	Alternate	Locale
Tetsuro Shimizu (Fourth)	Shinya Abe (Skip)	Hayato Sato	Haruto Ouchi	Sota Tsuruga	(Hokkaido) Sapporo
Takamori Chikahiro (Fourth)	Genji Ohara	Rio Hayashi (Skip)	Shotaro Maekawa	Keito Sosumi	(Hokkaido) Sapporo
Kohsuke Hirata	Shingo Usui	Koei Sato	Ryota Meguro	Hirofumi Kobayashi	(Hokkaido) Kitami
Kim Hak-jun	Moon Si-woo	Park Jin-hwan	Park Jong-hyeon	Kim Myeong-jun	(South Korea) Uiseong
Takumi Maeda	– (Note: Team Maeda played with three players.)	Hiroki Maeda	Uryu Kamikawa		(Hokkaido) Tokoro
Eito Nakagawa	Ayumu Ohta	Syun Shimokawara	Komei Kato	Koga Kamikita	(Hokkaido) Sapporo
Kotaro Noguchi	Yuto Kamada	Hiroshi Kato	Hiromasa Yonehara	Yuki Yoshimura	(Miyagi Prefecture) Sendai
Shunta Kobayashi (Note: Shunta Kobayashi skipped Team Ogiwara.)	Kouki Ogiwara	Taiki Kudo	Yuto Abe	Ayato Sasaki	(Hokkaido) Sapporo
P. N. Raju	Girithar Anthay	Sudheer Reedy	Kishan Vasant		(India) Hyderabad
Riku Yanagisawa (Fourth)	Tsuyoshi Yamaguchi (Skip)	Takeru Yamamoto	Satoshi Koizumi		(Nagano Prefecture) Karuizawa

=== Round robin standings ===
Final Round Robin Standings

Key
Teams to Playoffs

Pool A	W	L	W–L	PF	PA	DSC
(Hokkaido) Takumi Maeda	4	0	–	30	9	40.20
(Hokkaido) Shinya Abe	3	1	–	28	12	56.00
(Hokkaido) Team Ogiwara	2	2	–	24	15	74.40
(India) P. N. Raju	1	3	–	8	35	56.90
(Hokkaido) Eito Nakagawa	0	4	–	13	32	47.70

Pool B	W	L	W–L	PF	PA	DSC
(Nagano Prefecture) Tsuyoshi Yamaguchi	4	0	–	27	13	18.00
(Miyagi Prefecture) Kotaro Noguchi	2	2	1–0	18	19	50.40
(Hokkaido) Kohsuke Hirata	2	2	0–1	26	18	39.30
(Hokkaido) Rio Hayashi	1	3	1–0	16	23	138.10
(South Korea) Kim Hak-jun	1	3	0–1	11	25	50.60

=== Round robin results ===
All draw times are listed in Japan Standard Time (UTC+09:00).

==== Draw 1 ====
Thursday, August 7, 10:30 am

Sheet B	1	2	3	4	5	6	7	8	Final
(Hokkaido) Eito Nakagawa	0	1	0	0	0	1	0	X	2
(Hokkaido) Team Ogiwara 🔨	1	0	3	2	1	0	1	X	8

Sheet C	1	2	3	4	5	6	7	8	Final
(Hokkaido) Takumi Maeda	3	2	2	5	X	X	X	X	12
(India) P. N. Raju 🔨	0	0	0	0	X	X	X	X	0

==== Draw 2 ====
Thursday, August 7, 2:00 pm

Sheet D	1	2	3	4	5	6	7	8	Final
(Miyagi Prefecture) Kotaro Noguchi	0	0	1	0	2	0	1	0	4
(Nagano Prefecture) Tsuyoshi Yamaguchi 🔨	2	1	0	0	0	1	0	2	6

Sheet E	1	2	3	4	5	6	7	8	Final
(Hokkaido) Kohsuke Hirata 🔨	3	1	2	1	3	X	X	X	10
(South Korea) Kim Hak-jun	0	0	0	0	0	X	X	X	0

==== Draw 3 ====
Friday, August 8, 9:00 am

Sheet C	1	2	3	4	5	6	7	8	Final
(Hokkaido) Shinya Abe	1	2	4	0	4	X	X	X	11
(Hokkaido) Eito Nakagawa 🔨	0	0	0	1	0	X	X	X	1

Sheet E	1	2	3	4	5	6	7	8	Final
(Hokkaido) Team Ogiwara	0	1	0	0	0	0	0	X	1
(Hokkaido) Takumi Maeda 🔨	2	0	1	1	1	1	0	X	6

==== Draw 4 ====
Friday, August 8, 12:30 pm

Sheet B	1	2	3	4	5	6	7	8	Final
(South Korea) Kim Hak-jun	0	0	0	0	2	0	0	2	4
(Miyagi Prefecture) Kotaro Noguchi 🔨	0	0	0	2	0	1	0	0	3

Sheet D	1	2	3	4	5	6	7	8	Final
(Hokkaido) Rio Hayashi	0	2	0	0	1	0	1	X	4
(Hokkaido) Kohsuke Hirata 🔨	3	0	0	2	0	1	0	X	6

==== Draw 5 ====
Friday, August 8, 4:00 pm

Sheet D	1	2	3	4	5	6	7	8	Final
(Hokkaido) Team Ogiwara	0	1	0	2	1	0	1	0	5
(Hokkaido) Shinya Abe 🔨	2	0	1	0	0	2	0	1	6

Sheet E	1	2	3	4	5	6	7	8	Final
(India) P. N. Raju 🔨	0	3	0	0	2	1	0	X	6
(Hokkaido) Eito Nakagawa	0	0	2	1	0	0	2	X	5

==== Draw 6 ====
Friday, August 8, 7:30 pm

Sheet B	1	2	3	4	5	6	7	8	Final
(Nagano Prefecture) Tsuyoshi Yamaguchi	0	2	0	2	1	0	2	1	8
(Hokkaido) Kohsuke Hirata 🔨	3	0	1	0	0	1	0	0	5

Sheet C	1	2	3	4	5	6	7	8	9	Final
(South Korea) Kim Hak-jun 🔨	0	2	1	0	1	0	1	0	0	5
(Hokkaido) Rio Hayashi	0	0	0	2	0	1	0	2	1	6

==== Draw 7 ====
Saturday, August 9, 9:00 am

Sheet B	1	2	3	4	5	6	7	8	Final
(Hokkaido) Shinya Abe 🔨	1	2	1	4	0	X	X	X	8
(India) P. N. Raju	0	0	0	0	1	X	X	X	1

Sheet D	1	2	3	4	5	6	7	8	Final
(Hokkaido) Eito Nakagawa	1	0	2	0	1	0	1	X	5
(Hokkaido) Takumi Maeda 🔨	0	2	0	3	0	2	0	X	7

==== Draw 8 ====
Saturday, August 9, 12:30 pm

Sheet C	1	2	3	4	5	6	7	8	9	Final
(Hokkaido) Kohsuke Hirata 🔨	0	1	0	0	2	0	2	0	0	5
(Miyagi Prefecture) Kotaro Noguchi	0	0	2	1	0	1	0	1	1	6

Sheet E	1	2	3	4	5	6	7	8	Final
(Hokkaido) Rio Hayashi	0	0	0	1	0	1	0	X	2
(Nagano Prefecture) Tsuyoshi Yamaguchi 🔨	0	0	1	0	4	0	2	X	7

==== Draw 9 ====
Saturday, August 9, 4:00 pm

Sheet B	1	2	3	4	5	6	7	8	Final
(Hokkaido) Takumi Maeda 🔨	1	1	1	0	1	0	1	X	5
(Hokkaido) Shinya Abe	0	0	0	1	0	2	0	X	3

Sheet D	1	2	3	4	5	6	7	8	Final
(India) P. N. Raju	0	0	0	1	0	0	X	X	1
(Hokkaido) Team Ogiwara 🔨	0	1	1	0	3	5	X	X	10

==== Draw 10 ====
Saturday, August 9, 7:30 pm

Sheet C	1	2	3	4	5	6	7	8	Final
(Nagano Prefecture) Tsuyoshi Yamaguchi 🔨	0	2	0	2	0	1	1	X	6
(South Korea) Kim Hak-jun	0	0	2	0	0	0	0	X	2

Sheet E	1	2	3	4	5	6	7	8	Final
(Miyagi Prefecture) Kotaro Noguchi 🔨	0	2	0	2	0	1	0	X	5
(Hokkaido) Rio Hayashi	0	0	2	0	1	0	1	X	4

=== Playoffs ===
Semifinals
A1	(Hokkaido) Takumi Maeda	5
B2	(Miyagi Prefecture) Kotaro Noguchi	10
B1	(Nagano Prefecture) Tsuyoshi Yamaguchi	4
A2	(Hokkaido) Shinya Abe	5

Final
B2	(Miyagi Prefecture) Kotaro Noguchi	1
A2	(Hokkaido) Shinya Abe	6
Third place game
A1	(Hokkaido) Takumi Maeda	9
B1	(Nagano Prefecture) Tsuyoshi Yamaguchi	5

==== Semifinals ====
Sunday, August 10, 9:00 am

Sheet D	1	2	3	4	5	6	7	8	Final
(Hokkaido) Takumi Maeda	0	0	2	0	3	0	0	X	5
(Miyagi Prefecture) Kotaro Noguchi 🔨	1	6	0	1	0	1	1	X	10

Sheet E	1	2	3	4	5	6	7	8	Final
(Nagano Prefecture) Tsuyoshi Yamaguchi 🔨	1	0	0	0	1	0	2	0	4
(Hokkaido) Shinya Abe	0	0	0	2	0	2	0	1	5

==== Third place game ====
Sunday, August 10, 12:30 pm

Sheet B	1	2	3	4	5	6	7	8	Final
(Hokkaido) Takumi Maeda 🔨	2	0	0	2	0	4	1	X	9
(Nagano Prefecture) Tsuyoshi Yamaguchi	0	2	0	0	3	0	0	X	5

==== Final ====
Sunday, August 10, 4:00 pm

Sheet B	1	2	3	4	5	6	7	8	Final
(Miyagi Prefecture) Kotaro Noguchi	0	0	0	0	0	1	0	X	1
(Hokkaido) Shinya Abe 🔨	0	1	2	0	1	0	2	X	6

== Women ==
=== Teams ===
The teams are listed as follows:

Skip	Third	Second	Lead	Alternate	Locale
Satsuki Fujisawa	Chinami Yoshida	Yumi Suzuki	Yurika Yoshida		(Hokkaido) Kitami
Kang Bo-bae	Shim Yu-jeong	Kim Min-seo	Kim Ji-soo	Lee Bo-young	(South Korea) Jeonbuk
Ikue Kitazawa	Seina Nakajima	Minori Suzuki	Hasumi Ishigooka	Ami Enami	(Nagano Prefecture) Nagano
Yuina Miura	Kohane Tsuruga	Rin Suzuki	Hana Ikeda	Suzune Yasui	(Hokkaido) Sapporo
Park You-been	Lee Eun-chae	Kim Ji-yoon	Yang Seung-hee		(South Korea) Seoul
Honoka Sasaki	Yako Matsuzawa	Hazuki Kimura	Satsuki Maruzeni	Kaho Tamekuni	(Hokkaido) Kitami
Momoha Tabata (Fourth)	Miku Nihira (Note: Miku Nihira skipped Team Momoha Tabata.) (Skip)	Sae Yamamoto	Mikoto Nakajima		(Hokkaido) Sapporo
Misaki Tanaka	Miori Nakamura	Hiyori Ichinohe	Yuna Harada		(Aomori Prefecture) Aomori
Miyu Ueno	Yui Ueno	– (Note: Team Ueno played with three players.)	Asuka Kanai		(Nagano Prefecture) Karuizawa
Sayaka Yoshimura	Kaho Onodera	Yuna Kotani	Anna Ohmiya	Mina Kobayashi	(Hokkaido) Sapporo

=== Round robin standings ===
Final Round Robin Standings

Key
Teams to Playoffs

Pool A	W	L	W–L	PF	PA	DSC
(Hokkaido) Satsuki Fujisawa	4	0	–	24	8	51.30
(Nagano Prefecture) Ikue Kitazawa	2	2	1–1	22	17	35.10
(Hokkaido) Yuina Miura	2	2	1–1	16	25	53.50
(South Korea) Park You-been	2	2	1–1	23	24	87.40
(Hokkaido) Honoka Sasaki	0	4	–	16	27	64.40

Pool B	W	L	W–L	PF	PA	DSC
(Hokkaido) Sayaka Yoshimura	3	1	1–0	29	16	45.20
(Hokkaido) Team Tabata	3	1	0–1	20	24	45.60
(South Korea) Kang Bo-bae	2	2	1–0	21	16	31.50
(Nagano Prefecture) Miyu Ueno	2	2	0–1	17	16	50.70
(Aomori Prefecture) Misaki Tanaka	0	4	–	16	31	42.60

=== Round robin results ===
All draw times are listed in Japan Standard Time (UTC+09:00).

==== Draw 1 ====
Thursday, August 7, 10:30 am

Sheet D	1	2	3	4	5	6	7	8	Final
(Hokkaido) Satsuki Fujisawa	0	1	4	0	0	1	1	X	7
(Hokkaido) Yuina Miura 🔨	0	0	0	1	1	0	0	X	2

Sheet E	1	2	3	4	5	6	7	8	9	Final
(Hokkaido) Honoka Sasaki	0	2	0	0	2	0	0	2	0	6
(South Korea) Park You-been 🔨	2	0	1	1	0	1	1	0	1	7

==== Draw 2 ====
Thursday, August 7, 2:00 pm

Sheet B	1	2	3	4	5	6	7	8	Final
(South Korea) Kang Bo-bae 🔨	0	3	0	2	1	0	1	X	7
(Nagano Prefecture) Miyu Ueno	0	0	1	0	0	1	0	X	2

Sheet C	1	2	3	4	5	6	7	8	Final
(Hokkaido) Sayaka Yoshimura 🔨	0	3	0	0	4	0	4	X	11
(Aomori Prefecture) Misaki Tanaka	1	0	1	1	0	1	0	X	4

==== Draw 3 ====
Friday, August 8, 9:00 am

Sheet B	1	2	3	4	5	6	7	8	Final
(South Korea) Park You-been	1	0	1	0	0	0	1	X	3
(Hokkaido) Satsuki Fujisawa 🔨	0	2	0	0	3	1	0	X	6

Sheet D	1	2	3	4	5	6	7	8	Final
(Nagano Prefecture) Ikue Kitazawa	0	3	1	0	0	1	0	2	7
(Hokkaido) Honoka Sasaki 🔨	1	0	0	2	1	0	2	0	6

==== Draw 4 ====
Friday, August 8, 12:30 pm

Sheet C	1	2	3	4	5	6	7	8	Final
(Hokkaido) Team Tabata	0	1	0	1	1	1	0	1	5
(South Korea) Kang Bo-bae 🔨	1	0	2	0	0	0	1	0	4

Sheet E	1	2	3	4	5	6	7	8	Final
(Nagano Prefecture) Miyu Ueno 🔨	0	4	1	1	0	2	X	X	8
(Hokkaido) Sayaka Yoshimura	0	0	0	0	1	0	X	X	1

==== Draw 5 ====
Friday, August 8, 4:00 pm

Sheet B	1	2	3	4	5	6	7	8	Final
(Hokkaido) Yuina Miura 🔨	0	2	2	0	1	0	0	X	5
(Hokkaido) Honoka Sasaki	0	0	0	1	0	1	0	X	2

Sheet C	1	2	3	4	5	6	7	8	Final
(South Korea) Park You-been	0	0	1	0	3	0	2	1	7
(Nagano Prefecture) Ikue Kitazawa 🔨	0	2	0	1	0	1	0	0	4

==== Draw 6 ====
Friday, August 8, 7:30 pm

Sheet D	1	2	3	4	5	6	7	8	Final
(Nagano Prefecture) Miyu Ueno 🔨	0	2	0	0	1	0	1	0	4
(Hokkaido) Team Tabata	0	0	2	1	0	2	0	1	6

Sheet E	1	2	3	4	5	6	7	8	Final
(Aomori Prefecture) Misaki Tanaka	0	0	0	0	0	2	0	X	2
(South Korea) Kang Bo-bae 🔨	0	3	1	1	2	0	1	X	8

==== Draw 7 ====
Saturday, August 9, 9:00 am

Sheet C	1	2	3	4	5	6	7	8	Final
(Hokkaido) Honoka Sasaki 🔨	1	0	0	1	0	0	X	X	2
(Hokkaido) Satsuki Fujisawa	0	0	2	0	3	3	X	X	8

Sheet E	1	2	3	4	5	6	7	8	Final
(Nagano Prefecture) Ikue Kitazawa 🔨	4	0	3	3	X	X	X	X	10
(Hokkaido) Yuina Miura	0	1	0	0	X	X	X	X	1

==== Draw 8 ====
Saturday, August 9, 12:30 pm

Sheet B	1	2	3	4	5	6	7	8	9	Final
(Hokkaido) Team Tabata 🔨	0	3	2	0	0	0	1	0	1	7
(Aomori Prefecture) Misaki Tanaka	1	0	0	1	1	1	0	2	0	6

Sheet D	1	2	3	4	5	6	7	8	Final
(South Korea) Kang Bo-bae	0	0	0	1	0	1	0	X	2
(Hokkaido) Sayaka Yoshimura 🔨	1	2	2	0	1	0	1	X	7

==== Draw 9 ====
Saturday, August 9, 4:00 pm

Sheet C	1	2	3	4	5	6	7	8	Final
(Hokkaido) Yuina Miura	0	0	3	5	0	0	0	X	8
(South Korea) Park You-been 🔨	0	2	0	0	3	0	1	X	6

Sheet E	1	2	3	4	5	6	7	8	Final
(Hokkaido) Satsuki Fujisawa	0	0	0	1	0	0	2	X	3
(Nagano Prefecture) Ikue Kitazawa 🔨	0	0	0	0	0	1	0	X	1

==== Draw 10 ====
Saturday, August 9, 7:30 pm

Sheet B	1	2	3	4	5	6	7	8	Final
(Hokkaido) Sayaka Yoshimura 🔨	2	3	1	2	0	2	X	X	10
(Hokkaido) Team Tabata	0	0	0	0	2	0	X	X	2

Sheet D	1	2	3	4	5	6	7	8	9	Final
(Aomori Prefecture) Misaki Tanaka 🔨	0	0	1	0	0	0	2	1	0	4
(Nagano Prefecture) Miyu Ueno	1	0	0	1	1	1	0	0	1	5

=== Playoffs ===
Semifinals
A1	(Hokkaido) Satsuki Fujisawa	4
B2	(Hokkaido) Team Tabata	5
B1	(Hokkaido) Sayaka Yoshimura	9
A2	(Nagano Prefecture) Ikue Kitazawa	7

Final
B2	(Hokkaido) Team Tabata	3
B1	(Hokkaido) Sayaka Yoshimura	6
Third place game
A1	(Hokkaido) Satsuki Fujisawa	8
A2	(Nagano Prefecture) Ikue Kitazawa	1

==== Semifinals ====
Sunday, August 10, 9:00 am

Sheet B	1	2	3	4	5	6	7	8	Final
(Hokkaido) Satsuki Fujisawa 🔨	2	0	0	0	0	1	0	1	4
(Hokkaido) Team Tabata	0	2	2	0	0	0	1	0	5

Sheet C	1	2	3	4	5	6	7	8	Final
(Hokkaido) Sayaka Yoshimura 🔨	2	0	3	0	2	0	0	2	9
(Nagano Prefecture) Ikue Kitazawa	0	2	0	2	0	3	0	0	7

==== Third place game ====
Sunday, August 10, 12:30 pm

Sheet D	1	2	3	4	5	6	7	8	Final
(Hokkaido) Satsuki Fujisawa 🔨	1	1	0	0	6	X	X	X	8
(Nagano Prefecture) Ikue Kitazawa	0	0	0	1	0	X	X	X	1

==== Final ====
Sunday, August 10, 4:00 pm

Sheet D	1	2	3	4	5	6	7	8	Final
(Hokkaido) Team Tabata	0	0	1	0	1	0	1	0	3
(Hokkaido) Sayaka Yoshimura 🔨	0	1	0	2	0	2	0	1	6
