= 2017 Hokkaido Bank Curling Classic =

World Curling Tour event

- Host city: Sapporo, Japan
- Dates: August 3–6, 2017
- Men's winner: (South Korea) Team Kim
- Curling club: Seoul CC, Seoul
- Skip: Kim Soo-hyuk
- Third: Kim Tae-hwan
- Second: Park Jong-duk
- Lead: Nam Yoon-ho
- Finalist: (Japan) Yusuke Morozumi
- Women's winner: (Japan) Team Fujisawa
- Curling club: Loco Solare CC, Kitami
- Skip: Satsuki Fujisawa
- Third: Chinami Yoshida
- Second: Yumi Suzuki
- Lead: Yurika Yoshida
- Finalist: (South Korea) Kim Min-ji

The 2017 Hokkaido Bank Curling Classic was held August 3–6, 2017 in Sapporo, Japan. It was the first men's event and second women's event of the 2017–18 season. The total purse for the event was ¥ 1,700,000.

In the men's event, Kim Soo-hyuk defeated Yusuke Morozumi 8–7 in an extra end to win the tournament. In the women's event, Satsuki Fujisawa topped Kim Min-ji 7–3 in the final.

== Men ==
=== Teams ===
The teams are listed as follows:

Skip	Third	Second	Lead	Locale
Yuta Matsumura (Fourth)	Yasumasa Tanida	Shinya Abe (Skip)	Kosuke Aita	Sapporo, Japan
Junpei Kanda	Shota Iino	Shinya Iwamoto	Shotaro Hashimoto	Tokyo, Japan
Kim Chang-min	Seong Se-hyeon	Oh Eun-soo	Lee Ki-bok	Uiseong, South Korea
Kim Soo-hyuk	Kim Tae-hwan	Park Jong-duk	Nam Yoon-ho	Gangwon, South Korea
Yusuke Morozumi	Tetsuro Shimizu	Tsuyoshi Yamaguchi	Kosuke Morozumi	Karuizawa, Japan
Ryo Ogihara	Kohei Okamura	Kizuki Ryokawa	Daiki Yamazaki	Karuizawa, Japan
Kanya Shimizuno	Ryota Meguro	Sota Hirosawa	Ryota Haeno	Furano, Japan
Ryotarou Syukuya (Fourth)	Kouki Ogiwara	Riku Onodera	Gaku Suzuki (Skip)	Sapporo, Japan

=== Round-robin standings ===
Final round-robin standings

Key
Teams to Playoffs

Pool A	W	L
(South Korea) Kim Soo-hyuk	2	1
(Japan) Yusuke Morozumi	2	1
(Japan) Kanya Shimizuno	1	2
(Japan) Junpei Kanda	1	2

Pool B	W	L
(Japan) Gaku Suzuki	2	1
(Japan) Shinya Abe	2	1
(Japan) Ryo Ogihara	1	2
(South Korea) Kim Chang-min	1	2

=== Round-robin results ===
All draw times are listed in Japan Standard Time (UTC+09:00).

==== Draw 1 ====
Friday, August 4, 8:00 am

Sheet B	1	2	3	4	5	6	7	8	Final
(Japan) Yusuke Morozumi 🔨	0	0	3	0	2	0	4	X	9
(Japan) Kanya Shimizuno	0	0	0	1	0	1	0	X	2

Sheet C	1	2	3	4	5	6	7	8	Final
(South Korea) Kim Soo-hyuk	0	0	1	0	2	0	2	X	5
(Japan) Junpei Kanda 🔨	2	1	0	3	0	1	0	X	7

Sheet D	1	2	3	4	5	6	7	8	Final
(Japan) Shinya Abe 🔨	0	1	1	0	0	2	1	X	5
(Japan) Gaku Suzuki	0	0	0	3	5	0	0	X	8

Sheet E	1	2	3	4	5	6	7	8	Final
(Japan) Ryo Ogihara	0	1	0	0	0	0	3	1	5
(South Korea) Kim Chang-min 🔨	2	0	0	0	1	0	0	0	3

==== Draw 3 ====
Friday, August 4, 3:00 pm

Sheet B	1	2	3	4	5	6	7	8	9	Final
(Japan) Shinya Abe	0	1	0	2	0	1	1	0	1	6
(South Korea) Kim Chang-min 🔨	1	0	1	0	2	0	0	1	0	5

Sheet C	1	2	3	4	5	6	7	8	Final
(Japan) Gaku Suzuki	0	3	0	0	1	0	3	1	8
(Japan) Ryo Ogihara 🔨	2	0	1	1	0	0	0	0	4

Sheet D	1	2	3	4	5	6	7	8	Final
(Japan) Yusuke Morozumi 🔨	4	1	0	3	1	0	X	X	9
(Japan) Junpei Kanda	0	0	0	0	0	2	X	X	2

Sheet E	1	2	3	4	5	6	7	8	Final
(Japan) Kanya Shimizuno 🔨	1	0	0	1	0	0	X	X	2
(South Korea) Kim Soo-hyuk	0	5	2	0	2	1	X	X	10

==== Draw 5 ====
Saturday, August 5, 8:00 am

Sheet B	1	2	3	4	5	6	7	8	Final
(South Korea) Kim Soo-hyuk 🔨	2	1	0	0	3	0	1	X	7
(Japan) Yusuke Morozumi	0	0	1	1	0	1	0	X	3

Sheet C	1	2	3	4	5	6	7	8	Final
(Japan) Junpei Kanda 🔨	0	0	0	1	0	1	1	X	3
(Japan) Kanya Shimizuno	1	0	1	0	2	0	0	X	4

Sheet D	1	2	3	4	5	6	7	8	Final
(Japan) Ryo Ogihara 🔨	2	0	0	1	0	1	0	X	4
(Japan) Shinya Abe	0	2	0	0	2	0	2	X	6

Sheet E	1	2	3	4	5	6	7	8	Final
(South Korea) Kim Chang-min 🔨	0	3	0	1	1	0	0	X	5
(Japan) Gaku Suzuki	0	0	1	0	0	0	2	X	3

=== Playoffs ===
Semifinals
A1	(South Korea) Kim Soo-hyuk	5
B2	(Japan) Shinya Abe	4
B1	(Japan) Gaku Suzuki	4
A2	(Japan) Yusuke Morozumi	5

Final
A1	(South Korea) Kim Soo-hyuk	8
A2	(Japan) Yusuke Morozumi	7

Bronze medal game
B2	(Japan) Shinya Abe	7
B1	(Japan) Gaku Suzuki	4

Fifth place game
A3	(Japan) Kanya Shimizuno	2
B3	(Japan) Ryo Ogihara	5

Seventh place game
A4	(Japan) Junpei Kanda	1
B4	(South Korea) Kim Chang-min	7

==== Semifinals ====
Saturday, August 5, 6:00 pm

Sheet C	1	2	3	4	5	6	7	8	9	Final
(South Korea) Kim Soo-hyuk 🔨	0	1	0	0	3	0	0	0	1	5
(Japan) Shinya Abe	0	0	1	1	0	0	1	1	0	4

Sheet E	1	2	3	4	5	6	7	8	Final
(Japan) Gaku Suzuki 🔨	0	1	0	0	1	0	1	1	4
(Japan) Yusuke Morozumi	1	0	1	1	0	2	0	0	5

==== Final ====
Sunday, August 6, 11:30 am

Sheet B	1	2	3	4	5	6	7	8	9	Final
(South Korea) Kim Soo-hyuk 🔨	3	0	1	0	2	1	0	0	1	8
(Japan) Yusuke Morozumi	0	3	0	1	0	0	0	3	0	7

==== Bronze medal game ====
Sunday, August 6, 11:30 am

Sheet D	1	2	3	4	5	6	7	8	Final
(Japan) Shinya Abe	0	0	0	0	2	0	4	1	7
(Japan) Gaku Suzuki 🔨	1	1	1	0	0	1	0	0	4

==== Fifth place game ====
Sunday, August 6, 11:30 am

Sheet E	1	2	3	4	5	6	7	8	Final
(Japan) Kanya Shimizuno	0	0	1	0	0	1	0	X	2
(Japan) Ryo Ogihara 🔨	0	1	0	1	2	0	1	X	5

==== Seventh place game ====
Saturday, August 5, 6:00 pm

Sheet B	1	2	3	4	5	6	7	8	Final
(Japan) Junpei Kanda 🔨	0	0	1	0	0	0	X	X	1
(South Korea) Kim Chang-min	2	1	0	2	1	1	X	X	7

== Women ==
=== Teams ===
The teams are listed as follows:

Skip	Third	Second	Lead	Locale
Satsuki Fujisawa	Chinami Yoshida	Yumi Suzuki	Yurika Yoshida	Kitami, Japan
Daniela Jentsch	Josephine Obermann	Analena Jentsch	Pia-Lisa Schöll	Füssen, Germany
Kim Eun-jung	Kim Kyeong-ae	Kim Seon-yeong	Kim Yeong-mi	Uiseong, South Korea
Kim Min-ji	Kim Hye-rin	Yang Tae-i	Kim Su-jin	Gyeonggido, South Korea
Junko Nishimuro (Fourth)	Tori Koana (Skip)	Yuna Kotani	Mao Ishigaki	Yamanashi, Japan
Chiaki Matsumura	Emi Shimizu	Ikue Kitazawa	Hasumi Ishigooka	Karuizawa, Japan
Ayumi Ogasawara	Yumie Funayama	Kaho Onodera	Anna Ohmiya	Sapporo, Japan
Ami Enami (Fourth)	Minori Suzuki	Sae Yamamoto	Mone Ryokawa (Skip)	Karuizawa, Japan

=== Round-robin standings ===
Final round-robin standings

Key
Teams to Playoffs

Pool A	W	L
(Japan) Ayumi Ogasawara	3	0
(Germany) Daniela Jentsch	1	2
(South Korea) Kim Eun-jung	1	2
(Japan) Mone Ryokawa	1	2

Pool B	W	L
(Japan) Satsuki Fujisawa	3	0
(South Korea) Kim Min-ji	2	1
(Japan) Tori Koana	1	2
(Japan) Chiaki Matsumura	0	3

=== Round-robin results ===
All draw times are listed in Japan Standard Time (UTC+09:00).

==== Draw 2 ====
Friday, August 4, 11:30 am

Sheet B	1	2	3	4	5	6	7	8	Final
(Japan) Ayumi Ogasawara	0	0	1	2	2	4	X	X	9
(Germany) Daniela Jentsch 🔨	1	1	0	0	0	0	X	X	2

Sheet C	1	2	3	4	5	6	7	8	Final
(South Korea) Kim Eun-jung 🔨	1	0	0	1	0	4	0	X	6
(Japan) Mone Ryokawa	0	0	1	0	1	0	2	X	4

Sheet D	1	2	3	4	5	6	7	8	Final
(Japan) Satsuki Fujisawa 🔨	2	0	2	1	1	0	1	X	7
(Japan) Tori Koana	0	1	0	0	0	1	0	X	2

Sheet E	1	2	3	4	5	6	7	8	Final
(South Korea) Kim Min-ji 🔨	0	3	0	2	0	1	1	X	7
(Japan) Chiaki Matsumura	0	0	1	0	1	0	0	X	2

==== Draw 4 ====
Friday, August 4, 6:30 pm

Sheet B	1	2	3	4	5	6	7	8	Final
(Japan) Satsuki Fujisawa 🔨	1	5	4	0	0	1	X	X	11
(Japan) Chiaki Matsumura	0	0	0	2	1	0	X	X	3

Sheet C	1	2	3	4	5	6	7	8	Final
(Japan) Tori Koana	0	2	1	1	0	0	0	0	4
(South Korea) Kim Min-ji 🔨	1	0	0	0	3	1	1	2	8

Sheet D	1	2	3	4	5	6	7	8	Final
(Japan) Ayumi Ogasawara	1	0	0	1	1	2	1	X	6
(Japan) Mone Ryokawa 🔨	0	1	0	0	0	0	0	X	1

Sheet E	1	2	3	4	5	6	7	8	Final
(Germany) Daniela Jentsch 🔨	1	0	2	1	0	0	1	X	5
(South Korea) Kim Eun-jung	0	0	0	0	1	0	0	X	1

==== Draw 6 ====
Saturday, August 5, 11:30 am

Sheet B	1	2	3	4	5	6	7	8	Final
(South Korea) Kim Eun-jung 🔨	3	0	0	0	2	0	0	0	5
(Japan) Ayumi Ogasawara	0	2	1	1	0	0	0	2	6

Sheet C	1	2	3	4	5	6	7	8	Final
(Japan) Mone Ryokawa 🔨	1	1	0	4	0	3	1	X	10
(Germany) Daniela Jentsch	0	0	3	0	2	0	0	X	5

Sheet D	1	2	3	4	5	6	7	8	Final
(South Korea) Kim Min-ji	0	0	0	1	0	0	2	0	3
(Japan) Satsuki Fujisawa 🔨	0	1	1	0	1	1	0	1	5

Sheet E	1	2	3	4	5	6	7	8	Final
(Japan) Chiaki Matsumura	1	0	1	0	0	1	0	X	3
(Japan) Tori Koana 🔨	0	0	0	2	1	0	2	X	5

=== Playoffs ===
Semifinals
A1	(Japan) Ayumi Ogasawara	1
B2	(South Korea) Kim Min-ji	10
B1	(Japan) Satsuki Fujisawa	6
A2	(Germany) Daniela Jentsch	4

Final
B2	(South Korea) Kim Min-ji	3
B1	(Japan) Satsuki Fujisawa	7

Bronze medal game
A1	(Japan) Ayumi Ogasawara	9
A2	(Germany) Daniela Jentsch	3

Fifth place game
A3	(South Korea) Kim Eun-jung	9
B3	(Japan) Tori Koana	3

Seventh place game
A4	(Japan) Mone Ryokawa	4
B4	(Japan) Chiaki Matsumura	7

==== Semifinals ====
Sunday, August 6, 8:00 am

Sheet C	1	2	3	4	5	6	7	8	Final
(Japan) Ayumi Ogasawara 🔨	0	0	1	0	0	0	X	X	1
(South Korea) Kim Min-ji	0	1	0	4	3	2	X	X	10

Sheet E	1	2	3	4	5	6	7	8	Final
(Japan) Satsuki Fujisawa 🔨	2	0	2	0	1	0	1	0	6
(Germany) Daniela Jentsch	0	1	0	1	0	1	0	1	4

==== Final ====
Sunday, August 6, 3:00 pm

Sheet B	1	2	3	4	5	6	7	8	Final
(South Korea) Kim Min-ji 🔨	0	0	0	2	0	1	0	0	3
(Japan) Satsuki Fujisawa	0	1	1	0	1	0	2	2	7

==== Bronze medal game ====
Sunday, August 6, 3:00 pm

Sheet D	1	2	3	4	5	6	7	8	Final
(Japan) Ayumi Ogasawara 🔨	1	0	4	0	2	2	X	X	9
(Germany) Daniela Jentsch	0	1	0	2	0	0	X	X	3

==== Fifth place game ====
Sunday, August 6, 3:00 pm

Sheet E	1	2	3	4	5	6	7	8	Final
(South Korea) Kim Eun-jung	1	0	0	2	2	4	0	X	9
(Japan) Tori Koana 🔨	0	0	2	0	0	0	1	X	3

==== Seventh place game ====
Sunday, August 6, 8:00 am

Sheet B	1	2	3	4	5	6	7	8	Final
(Japan) Mone Ryokawa	0	0	1	0	0	3	0	X	4
(Japan) Chiaki Matsumura 🔨	0	4	0	0	2	0	1	X	7
