= 2022 Hokkaido Bank Curling Classic =

Japanese curling competition

- Host city: Sapporo, Japan
- Arena: Hokkaido Bank Curling Stadium
- Dates: August 4–7
- Men's winner: (South Korea) Team Jeong
- Curling club: Seoul CC, Seoul
- Skip: Jeong Byeong-jin
- Third: Lee Jeong-jae
- Second: Kim Min-woo
- Lead: Kim Tae-hwan
- Alternate: Lee Dong-hyeon
- Coach: Yang Jae-bong
- Finalist: (Japan) Yusuke Morozumi
- Women's winner: (Japan) Team Yoshimura
- Curling club: Hokkaido Bank Fortius, Sapporo
- Skip: Sayaka Yoshimura
- Third: Kaho Onodera
- Second: Anna Ohmiya
- Lead: Mina Kobayashi
- Alternate: Yumie Funayama
- Finalist: (Japan) Mayu Minami

The 2022 Hokkaido Bank Curling Classic was held from August 4 to 7 at the Hokkaido Bank Curling Stadium in Sapporo, Japan. It was the first tour event of the 2022–23 curling season and the first event of the Hokkaido Curling Tour. The total purse for the event is ¥ 1,700,000 on both the men's and women's sides.

In the men's final, the 2022 Korean champions Team Jeong Byeong-jin defeated the Yusuke Morozumi rink 7–2 to win the title. Team Jeong, also consisting of Lee Jeong-jae, Kim Min-woo and Kim Tae-hwan went a perfect 5–0 to win the event, finishing first in their pool with a 3–0 record. They then beat the other Korean team skipped by Jeong Yeong-seok in the semifinal to earn their spot in the final game. Team Morozumi suffered one loss to the Jeong rink in the round robin but were able to defeat Team Hayato Sato in the semifinal to also reach the final. In the third-place game, the Jeong Yeong-seok rink won 5–4 over Team Sato. The eight-team field was rounded out by the Shinya Abe, Kohsuke Hirata, Masaki Ishikawa and Takumi Maeda rinks.

In the women's final, the defending Pacific-Asia champions Team Sayaka Yoshimura bested Team Mayu Minami 5–4. Team Yoshimura, with third Kaho Onodera, second Anna Ohmiya, lead Mina Kobayashi and alternate Yumie Funayama dropped their opening game to the Ikue Kitazawa rink before winning their next two games to qualify for the playoffs. They then beat the previously undefeated Ha Seung-youn Korean rink to reach the final. Team Minami qualified for the playoffs with a 1–2 record, but were able to upset the Kitazawa rink in their semifinal. The bronze medal game was won by Team Kitazawa in a 6–2 final over Team Ha. The women's field was rounded out by Teams Momoha Tabata, Sae Yamamoto, Miori Nakamura and Honoka Sasaki.

== Men ==
=== Teams ===
The teams are listed as follows:

Skip	Third	Second	Lead	Alternate	Locale
Tetsuro Shimizu (Fourth)	Haruto Ouchi	Shinya Abe (Skip)	Minori Suzuki	Sota Tsuruga	Sapporo, Japan
Kohsuke Hirata	Shingo Usui	Ryota Meguro	Yoshiya Miura	Kosuke Aita	Kitami, Japan
Masaki Ishikawa	Yutaro Kasai	Takanori Hirano	Tatsuya Yokota	Kenji Takamatsu	Sapporo, Japan
Jeong Byeong-jin	Lee Jeong-jae	Kim Min-woo	Kim Tae-hwan	Lee Dong-hyeon	Seoul, South Korea
Jeong Yeong-seok	Park Jong-duk	Oh Seung-hoon	Seong Ji-hoon		Gangwon, South Korea
Takumi Maeda	Uryu Kamikawa	Hiroki Maeda	Asei Nakahara		Kitami, Japan
Yusuke Morozumi	Yuta Matsumura	Ryotaro Shukuya	Kosuke Morozumi	Masaki Iwai	Karuizawa, Japan
Go Aoki (Fourth)	Hayato Sato (Skip)	Kouki Ogiwara	Kazushi Nino	Ayato Sasaki	Sapporo, Japan

=== Round-robin standings ===
Final round-robin standings

Key
Teams to Playoffs

Pool A	W	L	PF	PA	DSC
(South Korea) Jeong Byeong-jin	3	0	13	9	59.50
(Japan) Yusuke Morozumi	2	1	16	10	37.02
(Japan) Shinya Abe	1	2	11	12	49.02
(Japan) Kohsuke Hirata	0	3	9	18	20.84

Pool B	W	L	PF	PA	DSC
(Japan) Hayato Sato	3	0	26	9	29.62
(South Korea) Jeong Yeong-seok	2	1	13	14	40.92
(Japan) Masaki Ishikawa	1	2	15	18	32.05
(Japan) Takumi Maeda	0	3	10	23	37.72

=== Round-robin results ===
All draw times are listed in Japan Standard Time (UTC+09:00).

==== Draw 1 ====
Thursday, August 4, 3:30 pm

Sheet B	1	2	3	4	5	6	7	8	Final
(Japan) Yusuke Morozumi 🔨	1	0	1	0	0	2	1	X	5
(Japan) Shinya Abe	0	0	0	2	0	0	0	X	2

Sheet C	1	2	3	4	5	6	7	8	9	Final
(South Korea) Jeong Byeong-jin	0	1	0	0	0	1	1	0	1	4
(Japan) Kohsuke Hirata 🔨	0	0	0	1	1	0	0	1	0	3

Sheet D	1	2	3	4	5	6	7	8	Final
(Japan) Masaki Ishikawa 🔨	2	1	2	0	3	2	X	X	10
(Japan) Takumi Maeda	0	0	0	2	0	0	X	X	2

Sheet E	1	2	3	4	5	6	7	8	Final
(South Korea) Jeong Yeong-seok 🔨	0	0	2	0	0	0	X	X	2
(Japan) Hayato Sato	0	4	0	0	1	3	X	X	8

==== Draw 3 ====
Friday, August 5, 10:00 am

Sheet B	1	2	3	4	5	6	7	8	Final
(Japan) Masaki Ishikawa	0	0	1	0	1	0	0	X	2
(Japan) Hayato Sato 🔨	0	1	0	2	0	3	4	X	10

Sheet C	1	2	3	4	5	6	7	8	Final
(Japan) Takumi Maeda 🔨	1	0	0	0	2	0	0	X	3
(South Korea) Jeong Yeong-seok	0	0	0	2	0	3	0	X	5

Sheet D	1	2	3	4	5	6	7	8	Final
(Japan) Kohsuke Hirata 🔨	1	0	0	1	0	0	1	X	3
(Japan) Yusuke Morozumi	0	2	1	0	1	3	0	X	7

Sheet E	1	2	3	4	5	6	7	8	Final
(South Korea) Jeong Byeong-jin	0	1	0	1	0	1	1	X	4
(Japan) Shinya Abe 🔨	1	0	1	0	0	0	0	X	2

==== Draw 5 ====
Friday, August 5, 5:00 pm

Sheet B	1	2	3	4	5	6	7	8	Final
(Japan) Shinya Abe	0	2	0	4	1	0	X	X	7
(Japan) Kohsuke Hirata 🔨	1	0	1	0	0	1	X	X	3

Sheet C	1	2	3	4	5	6	7	8	Final
(Japan) Yusuke Morozumi	0	2	0	0	1	0	1	0	4
(South Korea) Jeong Byeong-jin 🔨	1	0	3	0	0	0	0	1	5

Sheet D	1	2	3	4	5	6	7	8	Final
(South Korea) Jeong Yeong-seok	0	0	2	1	0	2	0	1	6
(Japan) Masaki Ishikawa 🔨	0	1	0	0	1	0	1	0	3

Sheet E	1	2	3	4	5	6	7	8	Final
(Japan) Hayato Sato 🔨	1	0	0	3	0	2	2	X	8
(Japan) Takumi Maeda	0	2	0	0	3	0	0	X	5

=== Playoffs ===
Semifinals
A1	(South Korea) Jeong Byeong-jin	8
B2	(South Korea) Jeong Yeong-seok	2
B1	(Japan) Hayato Sato	1
A2	(Japan) Yusuke Morozumi	10

Final
A1	(South Korea) Jeong Byeong-jin	7
A2	(Japan) Yusuke Morozumi	2

Third place game
B2	(South Korea) Jeong Yeong-seok	5
B1	(Japan) Hayato Sato	4

==== Semifinals ====
Saturday, August 6, 1:30 pm

Sheet C	1	2	3	4	5	6	7	8	Final
(South Korea) Jeong Byeong-jin 🔨	0	1	1	1	0	5	X	X	8
(South Korea) Jeong Yeong-seok	0	0	0	0	2	0	X	X	2

Sheet E	1	2	3	4	5	6	7	8	Final
(Japan) Hayato Sato	0	0	0	1	0	0	X	X	1
(Japan) Yusuke Morozumi 🔨	2	0	2	0	3	3	X	X	10

==== Third place game ====
Sunday, August 7, 10:00 am

Sheet B	1	2	3	4	5	6	7	8	Final
(South Korea) Jeong Yeong-seok	0	0	2	1	0	0	0	2	5
(Japan) Hayato Sato 🔨	0	2	0	0	0	1	1	0	4

==== Final ====
Sunday, August 7, 10:00 am

Sheet D	1	2	3	4	5	6	7	8	Final
(South Korea) Jeong Byeong-jin 🔨	2	0	0	1	0	4	X	X	7
(Japan) Yusuke Morozumi	0	1	0	0	1	0	X	X	2

== Women ==
=== Teams ===
The teams are listed as follows:

Skip	Third	Second	Lead	Alternate	Locale
Ha Seung-youn	Kim Hye-rin	Yang Tae-i	Kim Su-jin		Chuncheon, South Korea
Ikue Kitazawa	Seina Nakajima	Minori Suzuki	Hasumi Ishigooka	Chiaki Matsumura	Nagano, Japan
Mayu Minami	Kana Ogawa	Momo Kaneta	Nao Kyoto		Sapporo, Japan
Misaki Tanaka (Fourth)	Miori Nakamura (Skip)	Haruka Kihira	Hiyori Ichinohe	Yuuna Harada	Aomori, Japan
Honoka Sasaki	Mari Motohashi	Miki Hayashi	Ayuna Aoki	Mayumi Saito	Kitami, Japan
Momoha Tabata	Miku Nihira	Mikoto Nakajima	Ayami Ito		Sapporo, Japan
Miyu Ueno (Fourth)	Sae Yamamoto (Skip)	Suzune Yasui	Mizuki Hara	Momoka Iwase	Karuizawa, Japan
Sayaka Yoshimura	Kaho Onodera	Anna Ohmiya	Mina Kobayashi (Note: Alternate Mina Kobayashi played lead throughout the tournament.)	Yumie Funayama	Sapporo, Japan

=== Round-robin standings ===
Final round-robin standings

Key
Teams to Playoffs

Pool A	W	L	W–L	PF	PA	DSC
(South Korea) Ha Seung-youn	3	0	–	19	8	19.50
(Japan) Mayu Minami	1	2	1–1	11	16	43.70
(Japan) Momoha Tabata	1	2	1–1	11	16	54.52
(Japan) Honoka Sasaki	1	2	1–1	15	16	55.48

Pool B	W	L	W–L	PF	PA	DSC
(Japan) Ikue Kitazawa	2	1	1–0	18	16	42.70
(Japan) Sayaka Yoshimura	2	1	0–1	16	11	14.84
(Japan) Sae Yamamoto	1	2	1–0	11	14	67.52
(Japan) Miori Nakamura	1	2	0–1	11	15	38.98

=== Round-robin results ===
All draw times are listed in Japan Standard Time (UTC+09:00).

==== Draw 2 ====
Thursday, August 4, 7:00 pm

Sheet B	1	2	3	4	5	6	7	8	Final
(South Korea) Ha Seung-youn 🔨	0	2	0	2	1	3	X	X	8
(Japan) Momoha Tabata	0	0	0	0	0	0	X	X	0

Sheet C	1	2	3	4	5	6	7	8	Final
(Japan) Honoka Sasaki	0	0	1	0	0	2	0	1	4
(Japan) Mayu Minami 🔨	0	1	0	2	1	0	2	0	6

Sheet D	1	2	3	4	5	6	7	8	Final
(Japan) Miori Nakamura 🔨	0	0	0	1	0	1	0	0	2
(Japan) Sae Yamamoto	0	0	1	0	2	0	1	2	6

Sheet E	1	2	3	4	5	6	7	8	9	Final
(Japan) Sayaka Yoshimura	0	1	2	0	0	3	0	0	0	6
(Japan) Ikue Kitazawa 🔨	2	0	0	1	1	0	1	1	1	7

==== Draw 4 ====
Friday, August 5, 1:30 pm

Sheet B	1	2	3	4	5	6	7	8	Final
(Japan) Miori Nakamura 🔨	0	2	0	2	1	0	2	X	7
(Japan) Ikue Kitazawa	0	0	2	0	0	1	0	X	3

Sheet C	1	2	3	4	5	6	7	8	Final
(Japan) Sae Yamamoto	0	0	1	0	0	1	0	0	2
(Japan) Sayaka Yoshimura 🔨	1	1	0	0	1	0	0	1	4

Sheet D	1	2	3	4	5	6	7	8	Final
(Japan) Mayu Minami	0	0	1	0	0	2	0	0	3
(South Korea) Ha Seung-youn 🔨	0	1	0	0	2	0	0	2	5

Sheet E	1	2	3	4	5	6	7	8	Final
(Japan) Honoka Sasaki 🔨	1	0	1	0	1	2	0	1	6
(Japan) Momoha Tabata	0	2	0	1	0	0	1	0	4

==== Draw 6 ====
Saturday, August 6, 10:00 am

Sheet B	1	2	3	4	5	6	7	8	Final
(Japan) Momoha Tabata	0	3	3	0	0	1	X	X	7
(Japan) Mayu Minami 🔨	1	0	0	1	0	0	X	X	2

Sheet C	1	2	3	4	5	6	7	8	Final
(South Korea) Ha Seung-youn 🔨	1	1	0	1	1	2	0	0	6
(Japan) Honoka Sasaki	0	0	2	0	0	0	2	1	5

Sheet D	1	2	3	4	5	6	7	8	Final
(Japan) Sayaka Yoshimura 🔨	0	0	0	1	0	5	0	X	6
(Japan) Miori Nakamura	0	0	0	0	1	0	1	X	2

Sheet E	1	2	3	4	5	6	7	8	Final
(Japan) Ikue Kitazawa 🔨	0	2	0	3	0	2	1	X	8
(Japan) Sae Yamamoto	0	0	2	0	1	0	0	X	3

=== Playoffs ===
Semifinals
A1	(South Korea) Ha Seung-youn	5
B2	(Japan) Sayaka Yoshimura	6
B1	(Japan) Ikue Kitazawa	6
A2	(Japan) Mayu Minami	7

Final
B2	(Japan) Sayaka Yoshimura	5
A2	(Japan) Mayu Minami	4

Third place game
A1	(South Korea) Ha Seung-youn	2
B1	(Japan) Ikue Kitazawa	6

==== Semifinals ====
Saturday, August 6, 5:00 pm

Sheet B	1	2	3	4	5	6	7	8	Final
(South Korea) Ha Seung-youn 🔨	1	0	2	0	1	0	1	0	5
(Japan) Sayaka Yoshimura	0	1	0	2	0	2	0	1	6

Sheet D	1	2	3	4	5	6	7	8	9	Final
(Japan) Ikue Kitazawa 🔨	0	0	1	0	2	1	0	2	0	6
(Japan) Mayu Minami	0	1	0	1	0	0	4	0	1	7

==== Third place game ====
Sunday, August 7, 4:00 pm

Sheet E	1	2	3	4	5	6	7	8	Final
(South Korea) Ha Seung-youn 🔨	0	0	1	0	0	0	1	X	2
(Japan) Ikue Kitazawa	1	1	0	0	2	2	0	X	6

==== Final ====
Sunday, August 7, 4:00 pm

Sheet C	1	2	3	4	5	6	7	8	Final
(Japan) Sayaka Yoshimura 🔨	0	2	0	1	0	1	0	1	5
(Japan) Mayu Minami	0	0	1	0	2	0	1	0	4
