= 2016 Hokkaido Bank Curling Classic =

World Curling Tour event

- Host city: Sapporo, Japan
- Dates: August 4–7, 2016
- Men's winner: (Canada) Team Sturmay
- Curling club: Saville Community SC, Alberta, Canada
- Skip: Karsten Sturmay
- Third: Tristan Steinke
- Second: Chris Kennedy
- Lead: Caleb Boorse
- Finalist: (China) Wang Fengchun
- Women's winner: (Canada) Team Carey
- Curling club: The Glencoe Club, Alberta, Canada
- Skip: Chelsea Carey
- Third: Amy Nixon
- Second: Jocelyn Peterman
- Lead: Laine Peters
- Finalist: (South Korea) Gim Un-chi

The 2016 Hokkaido Bank Curling Classic was held August 4–7, 2016 in Sapporo, Japan. It was the first event of the 2016–17 curling season. The total purse for the event was ¥ 850,000.

Canada's rinks swept the event, winning both titles. Karsten Sturmay defeated Wang Fengchun from China in the men's final and Chelsea Carey beat Gim Un-chi from South Korea in the women's championship game.

== Men ==
=== Teams ===
The teams are listed as follows:

Skip	Third	Second	Lead	Locale
Shinya Abe	Yuta Matsumura	Yuki Hayashi	Hiroshi Sato	Sapporo, Japan
Alexander Baumann	Marc Muskatewitz	Tobias Thune	Manuel Walter	Hamburg, Germany
Junpei Kanda	Naoki Iwanaga	Shinya Iwamoto	Shota Iino	Tokyo, Japan
Kim Chang-min	Seong Se-hyeon	Oh Eun-soo	Kim Chi-goo	Uiseong, South Korea
Kim Soo-hyuk	Kim Tae-hwan	Park Jong-duk	Nam Yoon-ho	Gangwon, South Korea
Yusuke Morozumi	Tetsuro Shimizu	Tsuyoshi Yamaguchi	Kosuke Morozumi	Karuizawa, Japan
Karsten Sturmay	Tristan Steinke	Chris Kennedy	Caleb Boorse	Edmonton, Alberta, Canada
Wang Fengchun	Jiang Dongxu	Yuan Mingjie	Cheng Kuo	Harbin, China

=== Round robin standings ===
Final round robin standings

Key
Teams to Playoffs

Pool A	W	L
(Japan) Yusuke Morozumi	3	0
(Canada) Karsten Sturmay	2	1
(Germany) Alexander Baumann	1	2
(South Korea) Kim Chang-min	0	3

Pool B	W	L
(South Korea) Kim Soo-hyuk	3	0
(China) Wang Fengchun	2	1
(Japan) Shinya Abe	1	2
(Japan) Junpei Kanda	0	3

=== Round robin results ===
All draw times are listed in Japan Standard Time (UTC+09:00).

==== Draw 1 ====
Friday, August 5, 9:00 am

Sheet B	1	2	3	4	5	6	7	8	Final
(Japan) Yusuke Morozumi 🔨	3	0	1	0	1	0	1	1	7
(Germany) Alexander Baumann	0	1	0	1	0	3	0	0	5

Sheet C	1	2	3	4	5	6	7	8	Final
(South Korea) Kim Chang-min 🔨	0	0	1	1	0	1	0	0	3
(Canada) Karsten Sturmay	1	1	0	0	1	0	1	1	5

Sheet D	1	2	3	4	5	6	7	8	Final
(South Korea) Kim Soo-hyuk 🔨	0	3	0	0	3	0	3	X	9
(Japan) Junpei Kanda	0	0	1	1	0	1	0	X	3

Sheet E	1	2	3	4	5	6	7	8	Final
(China) Wang Fengchun 🔨	0	1	0	0	3	0	1	X	5
(Japan) Shinya Abe	1	0	1	0	0	1	0	X	3

==== Draw 3 ====
Friday, August 5, 4:00 pm

Sheet B	1	2	3	4	5	6	7	8	Final
(South Korea) Kim Soo-hyuk	0	0	2	1	2	0	0	1	6
(Japan) Shinya Abe 🔨	1	1	0	0	0	2	1	0	5

Sheet C	1	2	3	4	5	6	7	8	Final
(Japan) Junpei Kanda	0	1	0	2	0	1	0	X	4
(China) Wang Fengchun 🔨	1	0	3	0	1	0	3	X	8

Sheet D	1	2	3	4	5	6	7	8	Final
(Japan) Yusuke Morozumi 🔨	3	0	5	0	0	2	X	X	10
(Canada) Karsten Sturmay	0	0	0	1	0	0	X	X	1

Sheet E	1	2	3	4	5	6	7	8	Final
(Germany) Alexander Baumann	0	0	0	0	1	1	0	3	5
(South Korea) Kim Chang-min 🔨	0	1	0	1	0	0	0	0	2

==== Draw 5 ====
Saturday, August 6, 9:00 am

Sheet B	1	2	3	4	5	6	7	8	Final
(South Korea) Kim Chang-min	0	1	0	1	0	0	X	X	2
(Japan) Yusuke Morozumi 🔨	1	0	1	0	2	3	X	X	7

Sheet C	1	2	3	4	5	6	7	8	Final
(Canada) Karsten Sturmay	0	0	0	0	1	0	2	1	4
(Germany) Alexander Baumann 🔨	0	0	2	0	0	1	0	0	3

Sheet D	1	2	3	4	5	6	7	8	Final
(China) Wang Fengchun	0	1	0	0	2	0	X	X	3
(South Korea) Kim Soo-hyuk 🔨	0	0	2	1	0	4	X	X	7

Sheet E	1	2	3	4	5	6	7	8	Final
(Japan) Shinya Abe 🔨	3	0	2	0	4	0	1	X	10
(Japan) Junpei Kanda	0	3	0	1	0	2	0	X	6

=== Playoffs ===
Semifinals
A1	(Japan) Yusuke Morozumi	4
B2	(China) Wang Fengchun	5
B1	(South Korea) Kim Soo-hyuk	4
A2	(Canada) Karsten Sturmay	7

Final
B2	(China) Wang Fengchun	2
A2	(Canada) Karsten Sturmay	5

Bronze medal game
A1	(Japan) Yusuke Morozumi	6
B1	(South Korea) Kim Soo-hyuk	4

Fifth place game
A3	(Germany) Alexander Baumann	3
B3	(Japan) Shinya Abe	7

Seventh place game
A4	(South Korea) Kim Chang-min	9
B4	(Japan) Junpei Kanda	3

==== Semifinals ====
Saturday, August 6, 7:00 pm

Sheet C	1	2	3	4	5	6	7	8	Final
(Japan) Yusuke Morozumi 🔨	1	0	0	0	0	1	2	0	4
(China) Wang Fengchun	0	1	0	1	2	0	0	1	5

Sheet E	1	2	3	4	5	6	7	8	Final
(South Korea) Kim Soo-hyuk	0	2	0	0	1	0	1	0	4
(Canada) Karsten Sturmay 🔨	1	0	1	3	0	1	0	1	7

==== Final ====
Sunday, August 7, 12:30 pm

Sheet B	1	2	3	4	5	6	7	8	Final
(China) Wang Fengchun 🔨	0	0	1	0	0	1	0	X	2
(Canada) Karsten Sturmay	0	0	0	3	1	0	1	X	5

==== Bronze medal game ====
Sunday, August 7, 12:30 pm

Sheet D	1	2	3	4	5	6	7	8	Final
(Japan) Yusuke Morozumi	0	3	0	1	0	2	0	X	6
(South Korea) Kim Soo-hyuk 🔨	1	0	1	0	1	0	1	X	4

==== Fifth place game ====
Sunday, August 7, 12:30 pm

Sheet E	1	2	3	4	5	6	7	8	Final
(Germany) Alexander Baumann 🔨	1	0	1	0	0	1	0	0	3
(Japan) Shinya Abe	0	2	0	0	2	0	0	3	7

==== Seventh place game ====
Saturday, August 6, 7:00 pm

Sheet B	1	2	3	4	5	6	7	8	Final
(South Korea) Kim Chang-min	2	0	2	0	1	0	4	X	9
(Japan) Junpei Kanda 🔨	0	0	0	2	0	1	0	X	3

== Women ==
=== Teams ===
The teams are listed as follows:

Skip	Third	Second	Lead	Locale
Chelsea Carey	Amy Nixon	Jocelyn Peterman	Laine Peters	Calgary, Alberta, Canada
Satsuki Fujisawa	Chinami Yoshida	Yumi Suzuki	Yurika Yoshida	Kitami, Japan
Gim Un-chi	Um Min-ji	Lee Seul-bee	Yeom Yoon-jung	Gyeonggido, South Korea
Daniela Jentsch	Analena Jentsch	Josephine Obermann	Pia-Lisa Schöll	Füssen, Germany
Kim Eun-jung	Kim Kyeong-ae	Kim Seon-yeong	Kim Yeong-mi	Uiseong, South Korea
Junko Nishimuro (Fourth)	Tori Koana (Skip)	Yuna Kotani	Mao Ishigaki	Yamanashi, Japan
Ayumi Ogasawara	Sayaka Yoshimura	Kaho Onodera	Anna Ohmiya	Sapporo, Japan
Zheng Chunmei	Mei Jie	Fu Yiwei	Yang Ying	Harbin, China

=== Round robin standings ===
Final round robin standings

Key
Teams to Playoffs

Pool A	W	L
(Canada) Chelsea Carey	2	1
(South Korea) Gim Un-chi	2	1
(Japan) Tori Koana	1	2
(Japan) Ayumi Ogasawara	1	2

Pool B	W	L
(South Korea) Kim Eun-jung	3	0
(Japan) Satsuki Fujisawa	2	1
(China) Zheng Chunmei	1	2
(Germany) Daniela Jentsch	0	3

=== Round robin results ===
All draw times are listed in Japan Standard Time (UTC+09:00).

==== Draw 2 ====
Friday, August 5, 12:30 pm

Sheet B	1	2	3	4	5	6	7	8	9	Final
(Japan) Ayumi Ogasawara	1	0	0	1	1	1	0	1	0	5
(South Korea) Gim Un-chi 🔨	0	2	1	0	0	0	2	0	1	6

Sheet C	1	2	3	4	5	6	7	8	Final
(Canada) Chelsea Carey	0	3	0	0	1	0	3	1	8
(Japan) Tori Koana 🔨	1	0	2	1	0	1	0	0	5

Sheet D	1	2	3	4	5	6	7	8	Final
(South Korea) Kim Eun-jung 🔨	0	2	0	0	4	1	X	X	7
(Germany) Daniela Jentsch	0	0	1	1	0	0	X	X	2

Sheet E	1	2	3	4	5	6	7	8	Final
(China) Zheng Chunmei	0	0	0	0	1	1	X	X	2
(Japan) Satsuki Fujisawa 🔨	1	1	3	2	0	0	X	X	7

==== Draw 4 ====
Friday, August 5, 7:30 pm

Sheet B	1	2	3	4	5	6	7	8	Final
(South Korea) Kim Eun-jung	0	1	1	3	0	1	4	X	10
(Japan) Satsuki Fujisawa 🔨	2	0	0	0	1	0	0	X	3

Sheet C	1	2	3	4	5	6	7	8	Final
(Germany) Daniela Jentsch	0	0	3	0	0	0	X	X	3
(China) Zheng Chunmei 🔨	1	1	0	2	1	2	X	X	7

Sheet D	1	2	3	4	5	6	7	8	Final
(Japan) Ayumi Ogasawara	1	0	1	0	3	0	1	0	6
(Japan) Tori Koana 🔨	0	1	0	2	0	2	0	2	7

Sheet E	1	2	3	4	5	6	7	8	9	Final
(South Korea) Gim Un-chi 🔨	1	0	0	0	0	2	0	1	0	4
(Canada) Chelsea Carey	0	0	1	1	1	0	1	0	1	5

==== Draw 6 ====
Saturday, August 6, 12:30 pm

Sheet B	1	2	3	4	5	6	7	8	Final
(Canada) Chelsea Carey	0	0	0	1	0	0	X	X	1
(Japan) Ayumi Ogasawara 🔨	0	2	2	0	0	3	X	X	7

Sheet C	1	2	3	4	5	6	7	8	Final
(Japan) Tori Koana 🔨	0	0	1	0	2	0	1	0	4
(South Korea) Gim Un-chi	2	2	0	1	0	1	0	1	7

Sheet D	1	2	3	4	5	6	7	8	Final
(China) Zheng Chunmei	0	1	0	0	2	0	0	X	3
(South Korea) Kim Eun-jung 🔨	1	0	1	4	0	0	2	X	8

Sheet E	1	2	3	4	5	6	7	8	Final
(Japan) Satsuki Fujisawa 🔨	0	2	0	2	0	2	1	X	7
(Germany) Daniela Jentsch	0	0	1	0	2	0	0	X	3

=== Playoffs ===
Semifinals
A1	(Canada) Chelsea Carey	6
B2	(Japan) Satsuki Fujisawa	5
B1	(South Korea) Kim Eun-jung	5
A2	(South Korea) Gim Un-chi	6

Final
A1	(Canada) Chelsea Carey	7
A2	(South Korea) Gim Un-chi	4

Bronze medal game
B2	(Japan) Satsuki Fujisawa	1
B1	(South Korea) Kim Eun-jung	11

Fifth place game
A3	(Japan) Tori Koana	7
B3	(China) Zheng Chunmei	4

Seventh place game
A4	(Japan) Ayumi Ogasawara	6
B4	(Germany) Daniela Jentsch	5

==== Semifinals ====
Saturday, August 6, 7:00 pm

Sheet C	1	2	3	4	5	6	7	8	Final
(Canada) Chelsea Carey 🔨	1	2	0	1	0	1	0	1	6
(Japan) Satsuki Fujisawa	0	0	2	0	1	0	2	0	5

Sheet E	1	2	3	4	5	6	7	8	9	Final
(South Korea) Kim Eun-jung 🔨	2	1	0	0	1	0	1	0	0	5
(South Korea) Gim Un-chi	0	0	2	1	0	1	0	1	1	6

==== Final ====
Sunday, August 7, 12:30 pm

Sheet B	1	2	3	4	5	6	7	8	Final
(Canada) Chelsea Carey 🔨	0	3	2	1	0	1	0	X	7
(South Korea) Gim Un-chi	1	0	0	0	1	0	2	X	4

==== Bronze medal game ====
Sunday, August 7, 12:30 pm

Sheet D	1	2	3	4	5	6	7	8	Final
(Japan) Satsuki Fujisawa	0	0	0	0	1	0	X	X	1
(South Korea) Kim Eun-jung 🔨	2	1	2	3	0	3	X	X	11

==== Fifth place game ====
Sunday, August 7, 12:30 pm

Sheet E	1	2	3	4	5	6	7	8	Final
(Japan) Tori Koana	0	1	0	1	0	2	0	3	7
(China) Zheng Chunmei 🔨	1	0	2	0	0	0	1	0	4

==== Seventh place game ====
Saturday, August 6, 7:00 pm

Sheet B	1	2	3	4	5	6	7	8	Final
(Japan) Ayumi Ogasawara 🔨	0	2	2	0	2	0	0	X	6
(Germany) Daniela Jentsch	0	0	0	1	0	3	1	X	5
