= Mina Kobayashi =

Japanese curler (born 2002)

- Curler
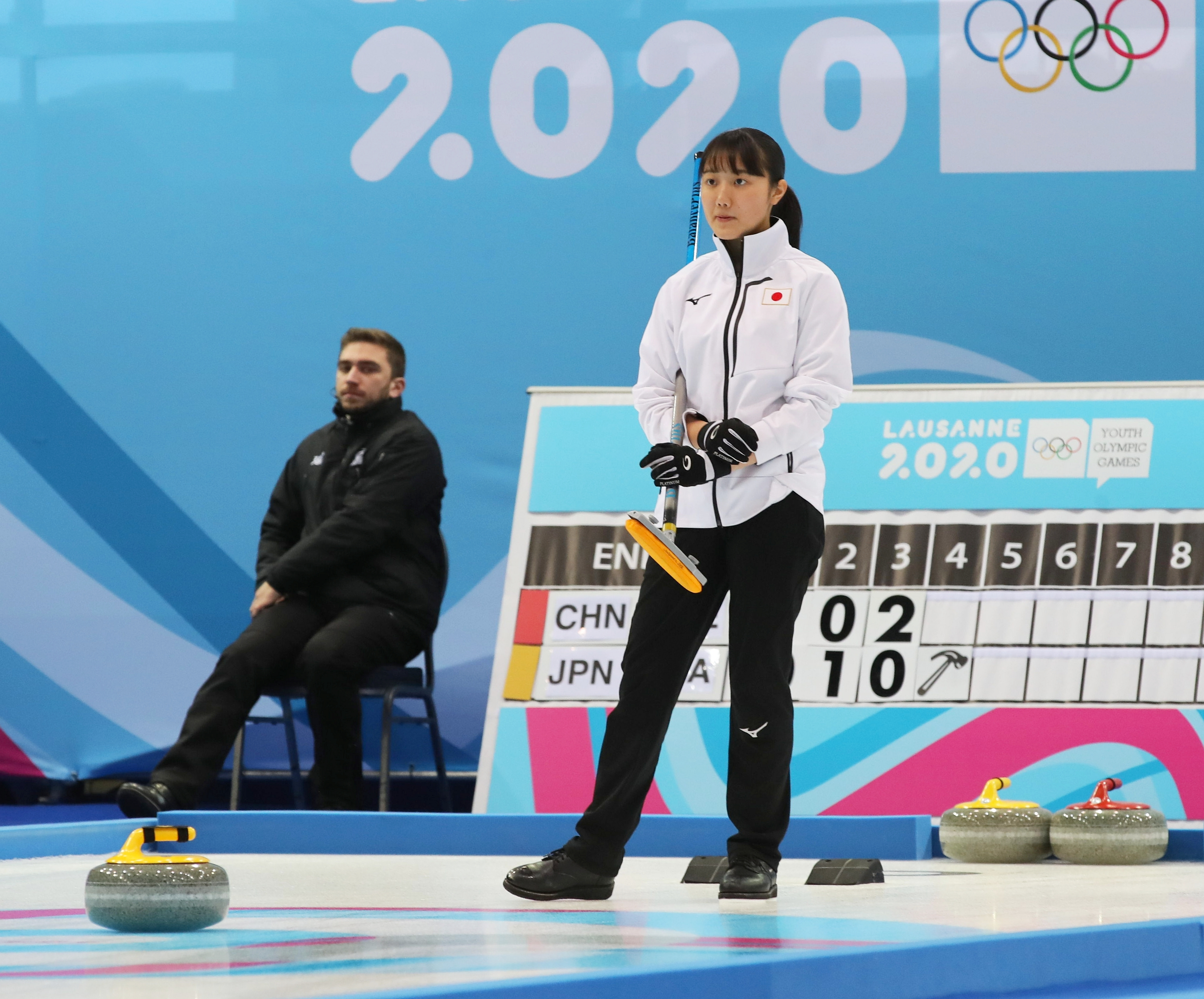
- Kobayashi at the 2020 Winter Youth Olympics
- Born: July 20, 2002 (age 24); Kushiro, Hokkaido

Team
- Curling club: Sapporo CC, Sapporo
- Skip: Mina Kobayashi
- Third: Kaho Onodera
- Second: Yuna Kotani
- Lead: Anna Ohmiya

Curling career
- Member Association: Japan
- World Championship: 1 (2025)
- World Mixed Championship: 1 (2019)
- Olympic: 1 (2026)
Medal record
Curling
Representing Japan
Winter Youth Olympics
Silver medal – second place	2020 Champéry
Representing Hokkaido
Japan Curling Championships
Gold medal – first place	2025 Yokohama
Bronze medal – third place	2026 Yokohama

Mina Kobayashi (小林 未奈, Kobayashi Mina; born July 20, 2002 in Kushiro) is a Japanese curler from Sapporo, Hokkaido. She is the skip of the FORTIUS curling team. At the international level, she represented Japan at the 2019 World Mixed Curling Championship and the 2020 Winter Youth Olympics, winning silver in the mixed team competition.

== Career ==
=== Juniors ===
Kobayashi competed in her first Japan Curling Championships during the 2017–18 season as third for the Sapporo CA team. Her team, with skip Momoka Iwase, second Midori Sugasawa, lead Mao Hino and alternate Suzune Yasui finished seventh with a 2–6 record, only defeating Nayoro Association and Team Hiroshima. Kobayashi and her teammates were unable to return to the national championship the following year.

In 2019, Kobayashi was selected to play lead on the Japanese team for the 2020 Winter Youth Olympics. The team also included skip Takumi Maeda, third Momoha Tabata and second Asei Nakahara. In preparation for the event, the team represented Japan at the 2019 World Mixed Curling Championship where they finished 4–3 in the round robin, just missing the playoffs. At the Games, the team finished 4–1 in the preliminary round of the mixed team competition, earning them a spot in the playoffs. In the quarterfinals, they upset the top seeded Canadian team and went on to beat New Zealand in the semifinal. They then fell to Norway in the final, settling for silver. Kobayashi then competed in the mixed doubles competition with France's Léo Tuaz. The pair lost their final qualifying game, however, had the best draw shot total of the losing qualifiers which meant they qualified as the fourth seeds. They then lost both the semifinal and the bronze medal game, finishing fourth.

At the 2020 Japan Junior Curling Championships, Kobayashi and her team of Momoha Tabata, Mikoto Nakajima and Miku Nihira won the gold medal. This qualified them for the 2021 World Junior Curling Championships, however, the event was cancelled due to the COVID-19 pandemic.

=== Women's ===
==== 2021–present: Team Yoshimura ====
In December 2021, Kobayashi would join Team Sayaka Yoshimura as their alternate. The lineup also included third Kaho Onodera, second Anna Ohmiya and lead Yumie Funayama. At the 2022 Japan Curling Championships, the team finished the round robin with a 4–4 record, enough to qualify for the playoffs. They then lost in the 3 vs. 4 page playoff game to Chubu Electric Power's Ikue Kitazawa.

In their first event of the 2022–23 season, Team Yoshimura won the 2022 Hokkaido Bank Curling Classic. They then won the Wakkanai Midori Challenge Cup two weeks later. In their next two events, they again reached the finals, losing the Argo Graphics Cup final to Sae Yamamoto and the ADVICS Cup final to Satsuki Fujisawa. After a successful start to the season, Yuna Kotani was added at the third position in September 2022. The revised lineup of the team was Yoshimura at skip, Kotani at third, Onodera at second, Ohmiya at lead, Kobayashi remaining as the alternate, and Yumie Funayama becoming the team's coach. In Canada, the team had back-to-back quarterfinal appearances at the S3 Group Curling Stadium Series and the 2022 Western Showdown, losing out to Stefania Constantini and Meghan Walter respectively. In December, Team Yoshimura competed in the 2022 Karuizawa International Curling Championships where they finished third, beating Loco Solare (Fujisawa) in the bronze medal game. In the New Year, the team played in the 2023 New Year Medalist Curling where they lost in the semifinals to Daniela Jentsch. It would be the team's last event of the 2022–23 season as positive cases of COVID-19 within the team forced them to withdraw from their qualifying round of the 2023 Japan Curling Championships.

The Yoshimura rink would again find success during the 2024–25 season, where they would finish in the quarterfinals at the 2024 National and the 2025 Players' Championship Grand Slam events. During the season, Team Yoshimura would win the national title at the 2025 Japan Curling Championships, Kobayashi's first, beating Miku Nihira 8–7 in the final. This win qualified them to represent Japan at the 2025 World Women's Curling Championship. At the World's however, the team would struggle, finishing 9th with a 4–8 record after round robin play.

Team Yoshimura would begin the 2025–26 season strong, winning the 2025 Hokkaido Bank Curling Classic, beating Momoha Tabata 6–3 in the final. They would continue their winning streak at the 2025 Japanese Olympic curling trials, beating Miyu Ueno 3–2 in a best-of-five final, and qualifying to represent Japan at the 2025 Olympic Qualification Event. At the Qualification event, the team would go 6–1 in the round robin and win 6–5 over Norway's Marianne Rørvik to win the event and qualify for the 2026 Winter Olympics, Kobayashi's first Adult Olympic Games.

== Personal life ==
Kobayashi attended Hokkaido Sapporo Higashi High School and Hokkaido High Technology College.

== Grand Slam record ==
Key
C	Champion
F	Lost in Final
SF	Lost in Semifinal
QF	Lost in Quarterfinals
R16	Lost in the round of 16
Q	Did not advance to playoffs
T2	Played in Tier 2 event
DNP	Did not participate in event
N/A	Not a Grand Slam event that season

Event	2023–24	2024–25	2025–26	2026–27
Invitational	T2	T2	Q	DNP
Masters	DNP	DNP	Q	Q
National	DNP	QF	QF	Q
Open	DNP	Q	SF	DNP
Players'	DNP	QF	Q	

== Teams ==
Season	Skip	Third	Second	Lead	Alternate
2015–16	Ruika Konno	Midori Sugasawa	Mao Hino	Mina Kobayashi	Momoka Iwase
2016–17	Mina Kobayashi	Ruika Konno	Momoka Iwase	Mao Hino	Midori Sugasawa
2017–18	Momoka Iwase	Mina Kobayashi	Midori Sugasawa	Mao Hino	Suzune Yasui
2018–19	Momoka Iwase (Fourth)	Mina Kobayashi (Skip)	Ruika Konno	Midori Sugasawa	Mao Hino
2019–20	Momoha Tabata	Honoka Sasaki	Mikoto Nakajima	Mina Kobayashi	Natsuko Ishiyama
2020–21	Momoha Tabata	Mina Kobayashi	Mikoto Nakajima	Miku Nihira	
2021–22	Miku Nihira	Mina Kobayashi	Mikoto Nakajima	Honoka Sasaki	
2021–22	Sayaka Yoshimura	Kaho Onodera	Anna Ohmiya	Yumie Funayama	Mina Kobayashi
2022–23	Sayaka Yoshimura	Kaho Onodera	Anna Ohmiya	Yumie Funayama	Mina Kobayashi
2022–23	Sayaka Yoshimura	Yuna Kotani	Kaho Onodera	Anna Ohmiya	Mina Kobayashi
2023–24	Yuna Kotani	Kaho Onodera	Anna Ohmiya	Mina Kobayashi	Sayaka Yoshimura
2024–25	Sayaka Yoshimura	Kaho Onodera (Note: Kaho Onodera and Yuna Kotani switched positions halfway through the season.)	Yuna Kotani	Anna Ohmiya	Mina Kobayashi
2025–26	Sayaka Yoshimura	Kaho Onodera	Yuna Kotani	Anna Ohmiya	Mina Kobayashi
2026–27	Mina Kobayashi	Kaho Onodera	Yuna Kotani	Anna Ohmiya	
