= Yuna Kotani =

Japanese curler (born 1998)

- Curler
- Born: May 26, 1998 (age 28); Sagamihara, Kanagawa Prefecture, Japan

Team
- Curling club: Sapporo CC, Sapporo
- Skip: Mina Kobayashi
- Third: Kaho Onodera
- Second: Yuna Kotani
- Lead: Anna Ohmiya

Curling career
- Member Association: Japan
- World Championship: 2 (2018, 2025)
- Olympic: 1 (2026)
Medal record
Curling
Japan Women's Championship
Gold medal – first place	2018 Nayoro
Gold medal – first place	2025 Yokohama
Silver medal – second place	2016 Aomori
Bronze medal – third place	2017 Karuizawa
Bronze medal – third place	2026 Yokohama

Yuna Kotani (小谷 優奈, Kotani Yuna; born May 26, 1998 in Sagamihara) is a Japanese curler.

At the national level she is a 2018 and 2025 Japan women's champion. She represented Japan internationally at the 2018 and 2025 World Women's Curling Championships and is representing Japan at the 2026 Winter Olympics.

== Career ==
=== Women's ===
==== 2017–2022: Team Koana ====
Kotani would begin to find national success in women's curling during the 2017–18 curling season, where as the second on Team Tori Koana, they would win the 2018 Japan Women's Curling Championship. This win qualified the Koana rink to represent Japan at the 2018 World Women's Curling Championship finishing in 10th with a 5–7 record. Team Koana also represented Japan at the third leg of the 2018–19 Curling World Cup, finishing with a 2–4 record.

To begin the 2019-20 curling season, Koana won the Morioka City Women's Memorial Cup and finished runner-up at the 2019 Cargill Curling Training Centre Icebreaker. The Koana rink was unable to win another Japanese Women's title, finishing 4th at the 2020 and 2021 Japan Curling Championships. Koana would announce at the beginning of the 2022-23 curling season that she would be stepping back to focus on mixed doubles, but remain as an alternate on the team that would now be skipped by Kotani. They would finish in 8th at the 2022 Japan Curling Championships, and Kotani would announce soon after the Japanese Championships she would be leaving the team to join Team Sayaka Yoshimura.

==== 2022–present: Team Yoshimura ====
Kotani joined the Sayaka Yoshimura rink in the middle of the 2022–23 season, with Yoshimura at skip, Kotani at third, Kaho Onodera at second, Anna Ohmiya at lead, and Mina Kobayashi as alternate with Yumie Funayama as the team's coach. In Canada, the team had back-to-back quarterfinal appearances at the S3 Group Curling Stadium Series and the 2022 Western Showdown, losing out to Stefania Constantini and Meghan Walter respectively. In December, Team Yoshimura competed in the 2022 Karuizawa International Curling Championships where they finished third, beating Loco Solare in the bronze medal game. In the New Year, the team played in the 2023 New Year Medalist Curling where they lost in the semifinals to Daniela Jentsch. It would be the team's last event of the 2022–23 season as positive cases of COVID-19 within the team forced them to withdraw from their qualifying round of the 2023 Japan Curling Championships.

Team Yoshimura would return for the 2024–25 season, where they would find success on tour, finishing in the quarterfinals at the 2024 National and the 2025 Players' Championship Grand Slam events. Kotani and Onodera would also switch positions halfway through the season, with Onodera going into the third position and Kotani going into the second position. During the season, Yoshimura would win their next national title at the 2025 Japan Curling Championships, beating Miku Nihira 8–7 in the final. This win qualified them to represent Japan at the 2025 World Women's Curling Championship. At the World's however, the team would struggle, finishing 9th with a 4–8 record after round robin play.

Team Yoshimura would begin the 2025–26 season strong, winning the 2025 Hokkaido Bank Curling Classic, beating Momoha Tabata 6–3 in the final. They would continue their winning streak at the 2025 Japanese Olympic curling trials, beating Miyu Ueno 3–2 in a best-of-five final, and qualifying to represent Japan at the 2025 Olympic Qualification Event. At the Qualification event, the team would go 6–1 in the round robin and win 6–5 over Norway's Marianne Rørvik to win the event and qualify for the 2026 Winter Olympics, Kotani's first Olympic Games.

== Teams ==
Season	Skip	Third	Second	Lead	Alternate	Coach	Events
2015–16	Junko Nishimuro (fourth)	Misato Yanagisawa	Tori Koana (skip)	Riko Toyoda	Yuna Kotani		JWCC 2016 (silver)
2016–17	Junko Nishimuro (fourth)	Tori Koana (skip)	Yuna Kotani	Mao Ishigaki	Kyoka Kuramitsu		JWCC 2017 (bronze)
2017–18	Junko Nishimuro (fourth)	Tori Koana (skip)	Yuna Kotani	Mao Ishigaki	Arisa Kotani		
2017–18	Tori Koana	Yuna Kotani	Mao Ishigaki	Arisa Kotani	Junko Nishimuro (JWCC); Kaho Onodera (WCC)	J. D. Lind (WCC); Yuji Nishimuro (WCC)	JWCC 2018 (gold); WCC 2018 (10th)
2018–19	Tori Koana	Junko Nishimuro	Mao Ishigaki	Arisa Kotani	Yuna Kotani	Yuji Nishimuro	CWC/3 (6th); JWCC 2019 (4th)
2019–20	Tori Koana	Yuna Kotani	Mao Ishigaki	Arisa Kotani			
2020–21	Tori Koana	Yuna Kotani	Mao Ishigaki	Arisa Kotani		Jim Cotter	
2021–22	Tori Koana	Yuna Kotani	Mao Ishigaki	Arisa Kotani			
2022–23	Sayaka Yoshimura	Yuna Kotani	Kaho Onodera	Anna Ohmiya	Yumie Funayama; Mina Kobayashi	Connor Njegovan	
2023–24	Yuna Kotani (Note: Sayaka Yoshimura did not play during the 2023–24 season as she was on maternity leave. Kotani moved up to skip the team with Onodera, Ohmiya and Kobayashi each moving up a position as well.)	Kaho Onodera	Anna Ohmiya	Mina Kobayashi	Sayaka Yoshimura		
2024–25	Sayaka Yoshimura	Kaho Onodera (Note: Kotani and Kaho Onodera switched positions halfway through the season.)	Yuna Kotani	Anna Ohmiya	Mina Kobayashi	Yumie Funayama	WWCC 2025 (9th)
2025–26	Sayaka Yoshimura	Kaho Onodera	Yuna Kotani	Anna Ohmiya	Mina Kobayashi	Yumie Funayama	
2026–27	Mina Kobayashi	Kaho Onodera	Yuna Kotani	Anna Ohmiya		Yumie Funayama	

== Personal life ==
Her younger sister Arisa is also a curler. They played together at the 2018 World Women's Curling Championship.
