= Yuina Miura =

Japanese curler

- Curler
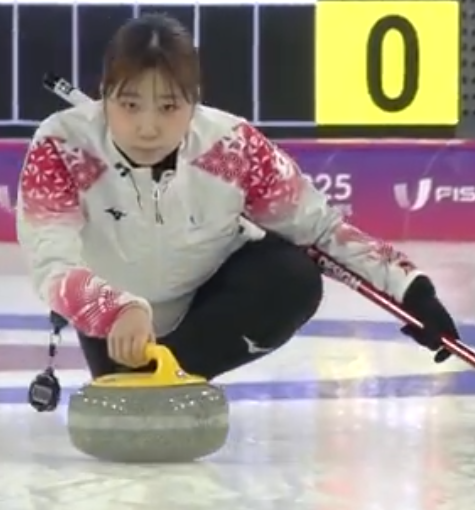
- Born: July 2, 2004 (age 22); Nayoro, Hokkaido, Japan

Team
- Curling club: Sapporo International University, Sapporo, Hokkaido
- Skip: Yuina Miura
- Third: Kohane Tsuruga
- Second: Rin Suzuki
- Lead: Aone Nakamura

Curling career
- Member Association: Japan
Medal record
Women's curling
Representing Japan
Asian Winter Games
Bronze medal – third place	2025 Harbin	Women's
World University Games
Gold medal – first place	2025 Turin
World Junior Curling Championships
Gold medal – first place	2022 Jönköping
Silver medal – second place	2023 Füssen
Silver medal – second place	2024 Lohja
World Junior Mixed Doubles Championships
Gold medal – first place	2026 Edmonton

Yuina Miura (三浦 由唯菜, Miura Yuina; born July 2, 2004) is a Japanese curler. She is a two-time World Junior champion. She currently skips her own team.

== Career ==
Miura start curling when she was in grade 4.

Miura first represented Japan at the 2018 World Junior B Curling Championships, where she was the lead of the team skipped by Yako Matsuzawa. The team did not advance to the playoff.

In 2022, she was selected to be the alternate of the Japanese team at the World Junior Curling Championships. She played in 7 games out of the 11 games during the competition. The team won the first World Junior Curling Championships gold medal for Japan by beating the Swedish team skipped by Moa Dryburgh in the final.

She skipped her team at the 2023 World Junior Curling Championships. The team lost in the gold medal game to the Scottish team skipped by Fay Henderson.

She also skipped her team at the 2025 Winter World University Games. The team won the gold medal.

She partnered with Kaito Fujii at 2026 World Junior Mixed Doubles Curling Championship and won the gold medal.

== Personal life ==
Miura attended Sapporo International University.

== Grand Slam record ==
Key
C	Champion
F	Lost in Final
SF	Lost in Semifinal
QF	Lost in Quarterfinals
R16	Lost in the round of 16
Q	Did not advance to playoffs
T2	Played in Tier 2 event
DNP	Did not participate in event
N/A	Not a Grand Slam event that season

Event	2026–27
Invitational	Q
