= Sae Yamamoto (curler) =

Japanese curler (born 2001)

- Curler
- Born: 2 May 2001 (age 25)

Team
- Curling club: Hokkaido Bank, Sapporo
- Skip: Miku Nihira
- Third: Momoha Tabata
- Second: Sae Yamamoto
- Lead: Mikoto Nakajima

Curling career
- Member Association: Japan
Medal record
Curling
Representing Japan
World Junior Championships
Gold medal – first place	2022 Jönköping
Representing Hokkaido
Japan Curling Championships
Silver medal – second place	2024 Sapporo
Silver medal – second place	2025 Yokohama
Silver medal – second place	2026 Yokohama

Sae Yamamoto (山本 冴, Yamamoto Sae; born 2 May 2001) is a Japanese curler. She currently plays second on the Hokkaido Bank curling team skipped by Miku Nihira. In 2022, she won the World Junior Curling Championships as the skip for the Japanese team.

== Early life and education ==
Yamamoto was born in Saku, Nagano. She graduated from Saku Municipal Asashina Junior High School and Nagano Prefecture Nozawa Kita High School, and currently attends Japan Women's University.

She began curling in fourth grade through the SWAN Project, which was held in Nagano to train Winter Olympic medalists.

== Career ==
In November 2015, Yamamoto was the runner up in the Japan Junior Curling Championship.

At the Japan Curling Championships in February 2016, although she advanced to the playoffs in 3rd place, Yamamoto ultimately placed 4th. She competed in the World Junior Curling Championships the next month in replacement of Miyu Ueno who was absent because of her high school entrance exams; Yamamoto placed tenth.

In May 2016, she joined the Karuizawa Fire Bomber as a first-generation student of the Curling Elite Academy opened by Sports Community Karuizawa Club. In August 2019, Karuizawa Fire Bomber disbanded after the JCA Jr. training camp.

In May 2022, Yamamoto won the first Japanese gold medal for the World Junior Curling Championship.

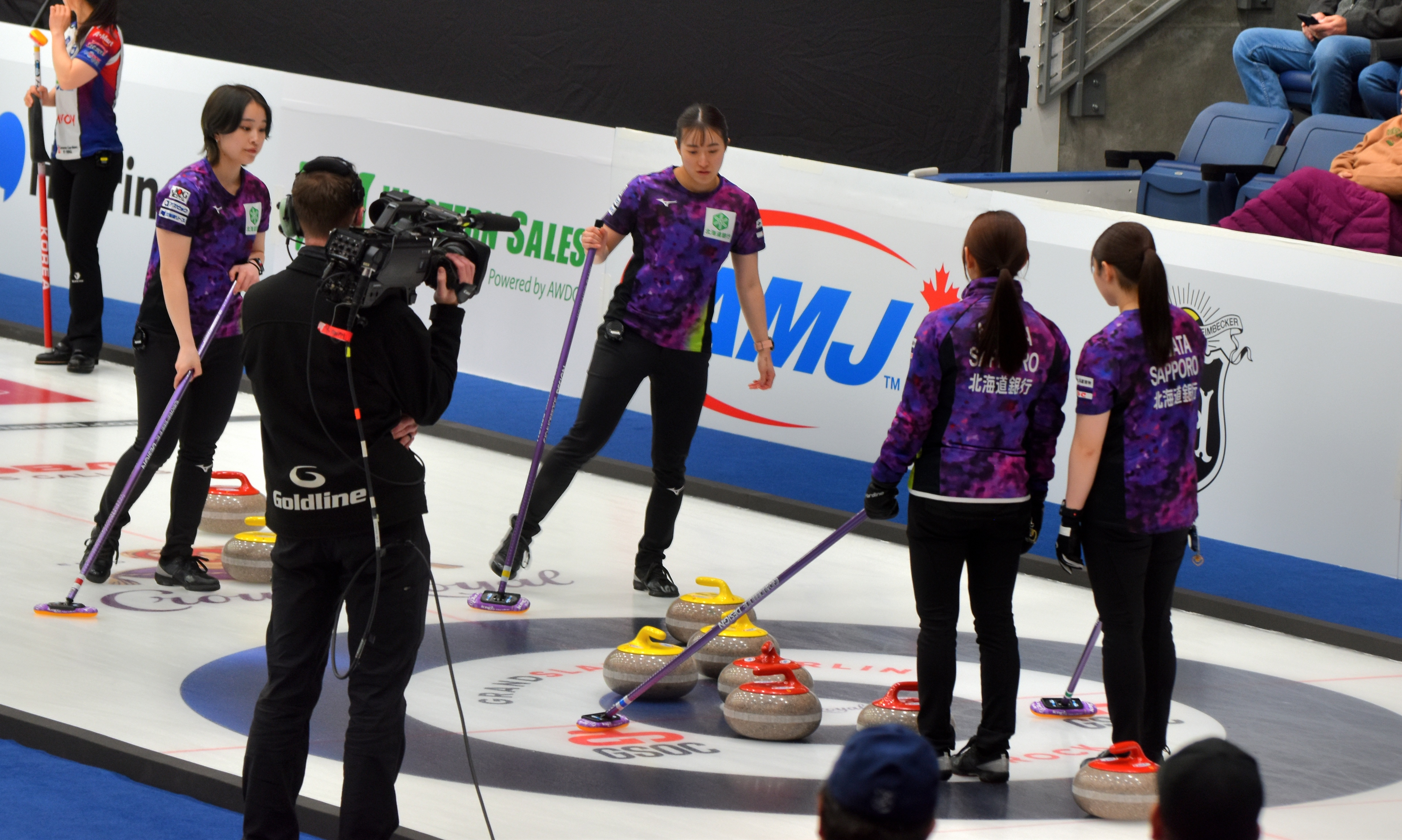
Yamamoto (centre) with teammates

Yamamoto joined the Hokkaido Bank Women's Curling Club in November 2022.

== Teams ==
Season	Skip	Third	Second	Lead	Alternate
2015–16	Seina Nakajima	Minori Suzuki	Ami Enami	Sae Yamamoto	
2015–16	Fumino Tsuchiya	Yuumi Suzuki	Yui Ueno	Asuka Kanai	Sae Yamamoto
2016–17	Ami Enami (Fourth)	Minori Suzuki	Sae Yamamoto (Skip)	Mone Ryokawa	
2018–19	Ami Enami (Fourth)	Minori Suzuki	Sae Yamamoto	Mone Ryokawa (Skip)	Asuka Kanai
2019–20	Minori Suzuki (Fourth)	Eri Ogihara	Yui Ueno	Sae Yamamoto (Skip)	Miyu Ueno
2020–21	Miyu Ueno (Fourth)	Eri Ogihara	Yui Ueno	Sae Yamamoto (Skip)	
2021–22	Miyu Ueno (Fourth)	Eri Ogihara	Yui Ueno	Sae Yamamoto (Skip)	Asuka Kanai
2021–22	Miyu Ueno (Fourth)	Eri Ogihara	Yui Ueno	Sae Yamamoto (Skip)	Yuina Miura
2022–23	Miyu Ueno (Fourth)	Sae Yamamoto (Skip)	Suzune Yasui	Moeka Iwase	Mizuki Hara
2022–23	Momoha Tabata	Miku Nihira	Mikoto Nakajima	Sae Yamamoto	Ayami Ito
2023–24	Momoha Tabata	Miku Nihira	Sae Yamamoto	Mikoto Nakajima	Ayami Ito
2024–25	Momoha Tabata (Fourth)	Miku Nihira (Skip)	Sae Yamamoto	Mikoto Nakajima	Ayami Ito
2025–26	Momoha Tabata (Fourth)	Miku Nihira (Skip)	Sae Yamamoto	Mikoto Nakajima	
