= Miyu Ueno =

Japanese curler (born 2001)

- Curler
- Born: March 12, 2001 (age 25); Nagano, Nagano

Team
- Curling club: Karuizawa CC, Karuizawa
- Skip: Miyu Ueno
- Third: Asuka Kanai
- Second: Yui Ozeki
- Lead: Yui Ueno
- Mixed doubles partner: Tsuyoshi Yamaguchi

Curling career
- Member Association: Japan
- World Championship: 1 (2024)
- World Mixed Doubles Championship: 1 (2024)
- Pan Continental Championship: 1 (2024)
- World Junior Curling Championship: 2 (2020, 2022)
Medal record
Women's curling
Representing Japan
World Junior Curling Championships
Gold medal – first place	2022 Jönköping
Representing Nagano
Japan Curling Championships
Gold medal – first place	2024 Sapporo
Gold medal – first place	2026 Yokohama
Silver medal – second place	2023 Tokoro

Miyu Ueno (上野 美優, Ueno Miyū; born March 12, 2001) is a Japanese curler from Karuizawa. She currently skips the SC Karuizawa Club curling team. She is a former World Junior champion.

== Career ==
=== Junior ===
Ueno first represented Japan at the 2016 World Junior B Curling Championships, where she played second for the team, which was skipped by Ayano Tsuchiya. There the team finished in second place, qualifying Japan for the 2016 World Junior Curling Championships. Ueno did not play for the team there, as she had high school entrance exams.

Ueno was the alternate on the Japanese team (skipped by Sae Yamamoto) for the 2019–20 season. That season, the team won the World Junior-B Curling Championships and represented Japan at the 2020 World Junior Curling Championships. There, the finished in fourth place. Ueno did not play in any games in either event.

Ueno threw last rocks on the Japanese team (skipped by Yamamoto, who threw lead rocks) at the 2022 World Junior Curling Championships. There, the team finished the round robin with a 6–3 record. In the playoffs, the team won both of their games, including beating Sweden (skipped by Moa Dryburgh) in the final, to win the gold medal. It was the first time Japan won a gold medal in any curling discipline.

Ueno was a member of the Japanese team at the 2023 Winter World University Games, throwing last rocks again on the team, which was skipped by Yamamoto. There, the team finished with a 2–7 record. Earlier in the season, the team won the Argo Graphics Cup.

=== Women's ===
In just their first season together, Ueno and her Karuizawa team of Asuka Kanai, Junko Nishimuro and sister Yui won the 2024 Japan Curling Championships, beating Miku Nihira in the final. At the event, she was named the tournament MVP. The win earned the team the right to represent Japan at the 2024 World Women's Curling Championship, where they went 3–9. Due to their win at the 2024 Japanese Women's Curling Championship, the Ueno team qualified for the 2025 Japanese Olympic curling trials. At the Olympic trials, the team finished in 2nd place, losing a close final to Sayaka Yoshimura 5–6.

=== Mixed doubles ===
In 2024, Ueno also won the Japan Mixed Doubles Curling Championship with partner Tsuyoshi Yamaguchi. The pair represented Japan at the 2024 World Mixed Doubles Curling Championship, finishing the round robin at 6–3 and in 9th place. Due to their win at the 2024 national championships, the pair also qualified for the 2025 Japanese Olympic mixed doubles curling trials. At the national Olympic trials, the team finished a disappointing 0–4.

== Personal life ==
Ueno was educated at Karuizawa Junior High School, Iwamurata High School and Japan Women's University.

== Grand Slam record ==
Key
C	Champion
F	Lost in Final
SF	Lost in Semifinal
QF	Lost in Quarterfinals
R16	Lost in the round of 16
Q	Did not advance to playoffs
T2	Played in Tier 2 event
DNP	Did not participate in event
N/A	Not a Grand Slam event that season

Event	2024–25	2025–26	2026–27
Invitational	T2	DNP	QF
Open	DNP	T2	
