= Tsuyoshi Yamaguchi (curler) =

Japanese curler (born 1984)

- Curler
- Born: 21 November 1984 (age 41); Minamifurano

Team
- Curling club: SC Karuizawa Club, Karuizawa, Nagano
- Skip: Tsuyoshi Yamaguchi
- Fourth: Riku Yanagisawa
- Second: Takeru Yamamoto
- Lead: Satoshi Koizumi
- Alternate: Yasumasa Tanida
- Mixed doubles partner: Miyu Ueno

Curling career
- Member Association: Japan
- World Championship: 9 (2009, 2013, 2014, 2015, 2016, 2017, 2023, 2025, 2026)
- World Mixed Doubles Championship: 3 (2018, 2019, 2024)
- Pacific-Asia Championship: 9 (2007, 2008, 2009, 2012, 2013, 2014, 2015, 2016, 2017)
- Pan Continental Championship: 3 (2022, 2023, 2025)
- World Junior Curling Championship: 1 (2002)
- Olympic: 1 (2018)
Medal record
Men's curling
Representing Japan
Pan Continental Championships
Bronze medal – third place	2023 Kelowna
Bronze medal – third place	2025 Virginia
Pacific-Asia Championships
Gold medal – first place	2016 Uiseong
Silver medal – second place	2015 Almaty
Silver medal – second place	2014 Karuizawa
Silver medal – second place	2013 Shanghai
Silver medal – second place	2012 Naseby
Silver medal – second place	2009 Karuizawa
Silver medal – second place	2008 Naseby
Bronze medal – third place	2017 Erina
Japan Curling Championships
Gold medal – first place	2007 Tokoro
Gold medal – first place	2008 Karuizawa
Gold medal – first place	2009 Aomori
Gold medal – first place	2013 Sapporo
Gold medal – first place	2014 Karuizawa
Gold medal – first place	2015 Tokoro
Gold medal – first place	2016 Aomori
Gold medal – first place	2017 Karuizawa
Gold medal – first place	2022 Tokoro
Gold medal – first place	2023 Tokoro
Gold medal – first place	2025 Yokohama
Gold medal – first place	2026 Yokohama
Silver medal – second place	2003 Karuizawa
Silver medal – second place	2006 Karuizawa
Silver medal – second place	2010 Tokoro
Silver medal – second place	2012 Aomori
Silver medal – second place	2024 Sapporo
Bronze medal – third place	2004 Moseushi
Bronze medal – third place	2020 Karuizawa

Tsuyoshi Yamaguchi (山口 剛史, Yamaguchi Tsuyoshi; born 21 November 1984) is a Japanese curler from Karuizawa, Nagano.

== Career ==
Yamaguchi has competed at the World Men's Curling Championships six times in his career. At the 2009 Worlds in Moncton, New Brunswick, Canada, he played third for the Japanese team, which placed tenth in the tournament; At the 2013 Worlds in Victoria, British Columbia, Canada, he played third for the Japanese team, which placed 11th in the tournament; At the 2014 Worlds in Beijing, China, he played third for the Japanese team, which placed fifth in the tournament; At the 2015 Worlds in Halifax, Nova Scotia, Canada, he played as third for the Japanese team, which placed sixth in the tournament; At the 2016 Worlds in Basel, Switzerland, he played second for the Japanese team, which placed fourth in the tournament; and at the 2017 Worlds in Edmonton, Alberta, Canada, he played second for the Japanese team, which placed seventh in the tournament. He played second for Yusuke Morozumi rink and represented Japan at the 2018 Winter Olympics, finishing in 8th place.

=== Mixed doubles ===
Yamaguchi represented Japan with Satsuki Fujisawa at the 2018 World Mixed Doubles Curling Championship, finishing in 5th place. The pair again represented Japan at the 2019 World Mixed Doubles Curling Championship, finishing in 5th once again. In 2024, Yamaguchi partnered with Miyu Ueno, and in their first year together, won the Japan Mixed Doubles Curling Championship. The pair represented Japan at the 2024 World Mixed Doubles Curling Championship, finishing the round robin at 6–3 and in 9th place. Due to their win at the 2024 national championships, the pair also qualified for the 2025 Japanese Olympic mixed doubles curling trials. At the national Olympic trials, the team finished a disappointing 0–4.

== Personal life ==
Yamaguchi is employed as a curling club manager and commentator. He is married.

== Grand Slam record ==
Key
C	Champion
F	Lost in Final
SF	Lost in Semifinal
QF	Lost in Quarterfinals
R16	Lost in the round of 16
Q	Did not advance to playoffs
T2	Played in Tier 2 event
DNP	Did not participate in event
N/A	Not a Grand Slam event that season

Event	2013–14	2014–15	2015–16	2016–17	2017–18	2018–19	2019–20	2020–21	2021–22	2022–23	2023–24	2024–25	2025–26	2026–27
Invitational	N/A	N/A	DNP	DNP	DNP	DNP	DNP	N/A	N/A	DNP	Q	T2	DNP	Q
Masters	DNP	DNP	DNP	DNP	DNP	DNP	DNP	N/A	DNP	DNP	DNP	DNP	T2	Q
National	Q	DNP	DNP	DNP	DNP	DNP	DNP	N/A	DNP	DNP	Q	DNP	DNP	Q
Open	N/A	DNP	DNP	DNP	DNP	DNP	DNP	N/A	N/A	DNP	DNP	DNP	T2	DNP
Champions Cup	N/A	N/A	DNP	Q	DNP	DNP	N/A	DNP	DNP	DNP	N/A	N/A	N/A	N/A
