= Advics Cup =

Hokkaido Curling Tour event in Japan

ADVICS Cup
- Established: 2019
- Host city: Kitami, Japan
- Arena: Tokoro Curling Hall
- Men's purse: ¥ 1,720,000
- Women's purse: ¥ 1,720,000

Current champions (2026)
- Men: (Japan) Takumi Maeda
- Women: (Japan) Miku Nihira

The ADVICS Cup is an annual bonspiel, or curling tournament, held at the Tokoro Curling Hall in Kitami, Japan. It was first held in 2019 as part of the men's and women's World Curling Tour. It is now held as part of the Hokkaido Curling Tour. The tournament is held in a round robin format.

== Past Champions ==
=== Men ===
Year	Winning team	Runner-up team	Purse (¥)
2019	(Japan) Yusuke Morozumi, Masaki Iwai, Ryotaro Shukuya, Kosuke Morozumi	(South Korea) Park Jong-duk, Nam Yoon-ho, Yoo Min-hyeon, Kim Jeong-min	1,700,000
2022	(Japan) Go Aoki (Fourth), Hayato Sato (Skip), Kouki Ogiwara, Kazushi Nino	(Japan) Tetsuro Shimizu (Fourth), Haruto Ouchi, Shinya Abe (Skip), Minori Suzuki	1,700,000
2023	(Japan) Tetsuro Shimizu (Fourth), Haruto Ouchi, Shinya Abe (Skip), Sota Tsuruga	(Japan) Go Aoki (Fourth), Hayato Sato (Skip), Kouki Ogiwara, Kazushi Nino	1,700,000
2024	(Japan) Tetsuro Shimizu (Fourth), Shinya Abe (Skip), Haruto Ouchi, Hayato Sato	(Japan) Riku Yanagisawa, Tsuyoshi Yamaguchi, Takeru Yamamoto, Satoshi Koizumi	1,700,000
2025	(Japan) Riku Yanagisawa (Fourth), Tsuyoshi Yamaguchi (Skip), Takeru Yamamoto, Satoshi Koizumi	(Japan) Tetsuro Shimizu (Fourth), Shinya Abe (Skip), Hayato Sato, Haruto Ouchi	1,700,000
2026	(Japan) Takumi Maeda, Hiroki Maeda, Uryu Kamikawa, Gakuto Tokoro, Ryotaro Shukuya	(Japan) Kohsuke Hirata, Shingo Usui, Takeshi Aoyanagi, Ryota Meguro	1,720,000

=== Women ===
Year	Winning team	Runner-up team	Purse (¥)
2019	(Japan) Satsuki Fujisawa, Chinami Yoshida, Yumi Suzuki, Yurika Yoshida	(China) Wang Rui (Fourth), Mei Jie (Skip), Yao Mingyue, Ma Jingyi	1,700,000
2022	(Japan) Satsuki Fujisawa, Chinami Yoshida, Yumi Suzuki, Yurika Yoshida	(Japan) Sayaka Yoshimura, Kaho Onodera, Anna Ohmiya, Mina Kobayashi	1,700,000
2023	(Japan) Satsuki Fujisawa, Chinami Yoshida, Yumi Suzuki, Yurika Yoshida	(Japan) Ikue Kitazawa, Seina Nakajima, Minori Suzuki, Hasumi Ishigooka	1,700,000
2024	(Japan) Sayaka Yoshimura, Yuna Kotani, Kaho Onodera, Anna Ohmiya	(Japan) Ikue Kitazawa, Seina Nakajima, Ami Enami, Minori Suzuki	1,700,000
2025	(Japan) Satsuki Fujisawa, Chinami Yoshida, Yumi Suzuki, Yurika Yoshida	(Japan) Momoha Tabata (Fourth), Miku Nihira (Skip), Sae Yamamoto, Mikoto Nakajima	1,700,000
2026	(Japan) Miku Nihira, Momoha Tabata, Sae Yamamoto, Mikoto Nakajima	(Japan) Satsuki Fujisawa, Yako Matsuzawa, Yumi Suzuki (3 player team)	1,720,000
