= 2025 Japan Curling Championships =

- Host city: Yokohama, Kanagawa
- Arena: Yokohama Buntai
- Dates: February 2 – February 9
- Men's winner: (Nagano Prefecture) SC Karuizawa Club
- Curling club: Karuizawa CC, Karuizawa, Nagano
- Skip: Riku Yanagisawa
- Fourth: Tsuyoshi Yamaguchi
- Second: Takeru Yamamoto
- Lead: Satoshi Koizumi
- Coach: Yuji Nishimuro
- Finalist: (Hokkaido) Loco Solare (Maeda)
- Women's winner: (Hokkaido) Fortius
- Curling club: Sapporo CC, Sapporo, Hokkaido
- Skip: Sayaka Yoshimura
- Third: Kaho Onodera
- Second: Yuna Kotani
- Lead: Anna Ohmiya
- Alternate: Mina Kobayashi
- Coach: Yumie Funayama & Niklas Edin
- Finalist: Hokkaido Bank (Nihira)

The 2025 Japan Curling Championships (日本カーリング選手権大会 横浜2025, branded as the 42nd Zen-Noh Japan Curling Championships) took place from February 2 to 9 at the Yokohama Buntai in Yokohama, Kanagawa, Japan. The winning rinks, led by Riku Yanagisawa and Sayaka Yoshimura, earned the right to represent Japan at the 2025 World Men's Curling Championship and the 2025 World Women's Curling Championship, respectively. Additionally, they have the opportunity to accumulate points toward qualification for the 2026 Winter Olympics.

== Men ==
=== Qualification ===
The following teams qualified to participate in the 2025 Japan Curling Championship:

Qualification method	Berths	Qualifying team(s)
2024 Champion	1	(Hokkaido) Consadole
2024 Runner-Up	1	(Nagano Prefecture) SC Karuizawa Club
Committee Recommendation	3	(Nagano Prefecture) TM Karuizawa (Hokkaido) Loco Solare (Hokkaido) KiT Curling Club
Hokkaido Region	1	Hokkaido University
Tōhoku Region	1	(Aomori Prefecture) Team Sato
Kanto Region	1	(Tokyo) Team TANI
Chūbu Region	1	(Nagano Prefecture) Nagano CA
West Japan Region	1	(Kyoto Prefecture) Team Kyoto CA
TOTAL	10	

=== Teams ===
The teams are listed as follows:

Team	Skip	Third	Second	Lead	Alternate	Locale
Consadole	Tetsuro Shimizu (Fourth)	Shinya Abe (Skip)	Hayato Sato	Haruto Ouchi	Sota Tsuruga	(Hokkaido) Kitami
Hokkaido University	Natsu Kikuchi	Genji Ohara	Rio Hayashi	Shunki Kasai	Ryota Hata	(Hokkaido) Sapporo
KiT Curling Club	Kohsuke Hirata	Shingo Usui	Ryota Meguro	Yoshiya Miura	Hirofumi Kobayashi	(Hokkaido) Kitami
Loco Solare	Takumi Maeda	Asei Nakahara	Hiroki Maeda	Uryu Kamikawa	Toa Nakahara	(Hokkaido) Kitami
Nagano CA	Rui Matsuura	Yoshiro Shimizu	Minato Hayami	Kai Shu	Genya Nishizawa	(Nagano Prefecture) Nagano
SC Karuizawa Club	Riku Yanagisawa	Tsuyoshi Yamaguchi	Takeru Yamamoto	Satoshi Koizumi		(Nagano Prefecture) Karuizawa
Team Kyoto CA	Ryo Wakabayashi	Kosuke Yuuki	Akira Kageyama	Shinji Okamoto	Masahiro Aisaka	(Kyoto Prefecture) Kyoto
Team Sato	Koei Sato	Chikara Segawa	Kaishi Sato	Haruta Imamoto	Kota Imamoto	(Aomori Prefecture) Aomori
Team TANI	Ryutaro Tani	Shunta Mizukami	Kohei Okamura	Daiki Yamazaki	Takuya Ishikawa	Tokyo
TM Karuizawa	Yusuke Morozumi	Yuta Matsumura	Ryotaro Shukuya	Masaki Iwai	Kosuke Morozumi	(Nagano Prefecture) Karuizawa

=== Round robin standings ===
Final Round Robin Standings

Key
Teams to Championship Round (Top 3 of Each Pool)

Pool C
Team	Skip	W	L	W–L	DSC
(Nagano Prefecture) TM Karuizawa	Yusuke Morozumi	3	1	1–0	48.1
(Nagano Prefecture) SC Karuizawa Club	Riku Yanagisawa	3	1	0–1	18.3
(Hokkaido) Loco Solare	Takumi Maeda	2	2	–	27.5
Hokkaido University	Natsu Kikuchi	1	3	1–0	90.7
(Tokyo) Team TANI	Ryutaro Tani	1	3	0–1	49.6

Pool D
Team	Skip	W	L	W–L	DSC
(Hokkaido) Consadole	Shinya Abe	4	0	–	48.9
(Hokkaido) KiT Curling Club	Kohsuke Hirata	3	1	–	42.1
(Nagano Prefecture) Nagano CA	Rui Matsuura	2	2	–	48.1
(Aomori Prefecture) Team Sato	Koei Sato	1	3	–	56.0
(Kyoto Prefecture) Team Kyoto CA	Ryo Wakabayashi	0	4	–	34.3

Pool C Round Robin Summary Table
Pos.	Team	(Hokkaido) HU	(Hokkaido) LS	(Nagano Prefecture) SCKC	(Tokyo) TT	(Nagano Prefecture) TMK	Record
4	Hokkaido University (Kikuchi)	—	5–6	2–7	6–3	5–10	1–3
3	(Hokkaido) Loco Solare (Maeda)	6–5	—	4–6	6–7	4–3	2–2
2	(Nagano Prefecture) SC Karuizawa Club (Yanagisawa)	7–2	6–4	—	7–6	6–7	3–1
5	(Tokyo) Team TANI (Tani)	3–6	7–6	6–7	—	4–9	1–3
1	(Nagano Prefecture) TM Karuizawa (Morozumi)	10–5	3–4	7–6	9–4	—	3–1

Pool D Round Robin Summary Table
Pos.	Team	(Hokkaido) C	(Hokkaido) KCC	(Nagano Prefecture) NCA	(Kyoto Prefecture) TKCA	(Aomori Prefecture) TS	Record
1	(Hokkaido) Consadole (Abe)	—	8–4	6–2	10–3	8–6	4–0
2	(Hokkaido) KiT Curling Club (Hirata)	4–8	—	9–1	9–4	11–1	3–1
3	(Nagano Prefecture) Nagano CA (Matsuura)	2–6	1–9	—	9–4	9–2	2–2
5	(Kyoto Prefecture) Team Kyoto CA (Wakabayashi)	3–10	4–9	4–9	—	7–10	0–4
4	(Aomori Prefecture) Team Sato (Sato)	6–8	1–11	2–9	10–7	—	1–3

=== Round robin results ===
All draws are listed in Japan Standard Time (UTC+09:00).

==== Draw 2 ====
Monday, February 3, 9:00

Sheet A	1	2	3	4	5	6	7	8	9	10	Final
Hokkaido University (Kikuchi)	0	0	0	1	0	1	0	0	0	X	2
(Nagano Prefecture) SC Karuizawa Club (Yanagisawa) 🔨	0	0	1	0	2	0	2	1	1	X	7

Sheet B	1	2	3	4	5	6	7	8	9	10	Final
(Nagano Prefecture) TM Karuizawa (Morozumi) 🔨	2	1	0	1	0	1	2	1	1	X	9
(Tokyo) Team TANI (Tani)	0	0	1	0	3	0	0	0	0	X	4

Sheet C	1	2	3	4	5	6	7	8	9	10	Final
(Hokkaido) KiT Curling Club (Hirata)	0	1	0	0	1	0	2	0	0	X	4
(Hokkaido) Consadole (Abe) 🔨	1	0	1	0	0	3	0	2	1	X	8

Sheet D	1	2	3	4	5	6	7	8	9	10	Final
(Kyoto Prefecture) Team Kyoto CA (Wakabayashi)	0	2	2	0	0	0	0	3	0	X	7
(Aomori Prefecture) Team Sato (Sato) 🔨	1	0	0	4	0	1	3	0	1	X	10

==== Draw 4 ====
Monday, February 3, 18:00

Sheet A	1	2	3	4	5	6	7	8	9	10	Final
(Aomori Prefecture) Team Sato (Sato)	0	1	0	0	0	0	X	X	X	X	1
(Hokkaido) KiT Curling Club (Hirata) 🔨	2	0	3	3	2	1	X	X	X	X	11

Sheet B	1	2	3	4	5	6	7	8	9	10	Final
(Hokkaido) Loco Solare (Maeda) 🔨	0	3	0	0	1	1	0	1	0	X	6
Hokkaido University (Kikuchi)	0	0	1	0	0	0	3	0	1	X	5

Sheet C	1	2	3	4	5	6	7	8	9	10	Final
(Nagano Prefecture) Nagano CA (Matsuura) 🔨	0	3	0	1	1	0	2	0	2	X	9
(Kyoto Prefecture) Team Kyoto CA (Wakabayashi)	1	0	1	0	0	1	0	1	0	X	4

Sheet D	1	2	3	4	5	6	7	8	9	10	Final
(Nagano Prefecture) SC Karuizawa Club (Yanagisawa) 🔨	1	0	0	1	0	1	0	0	3	0	6
(Nagano Prefecture) TM Karuizawa (Morozumi)	0	0	3	0	0	0	2	1	0	1	7

==== Draw 6 ====
Tuesday, February 4, 13:30

Sheet A	1	2	3	4	5	6	7	8	9	10	Final
(Hokkaido) Consadole (Abe)	0	2	0	3	0	0	3	2	X	X	10
(Kyoto Prefecture) Team Kyoto CA (Wakabayashi) 🔨	1	0	1	0	1	0	0	0	X	X	3

Sheet B	1	2	3	4	5	6	7	8	9	10	Final
(Aomori Prefecture) Team Sato (Sato) 🔨	0	0	0	0	2	0	0	X	X	X	2
(Nagano Prefecture) Nagano CA (Matsuura)	0	1	3	2	0	2	1	X	X	X	9

Sheet C	1	2	3	4	5	6	7	8	9	10	Final
(Nagano Prefecture) SC Karuizawa Club (Yanagisawa)	0	0	2	1	1	0	0	1	0	1	6
(Hokkaido) Loco Solare (Maeda) 🔨	0	2	0	0	0	1	0	0	1	0	4

Sheet D	1	2	3	4	5	6	7	8	9	10	Final
(Tokyo) Team TANI (Tani) 🔨	0	0	1	0	1	0	1	0	0	X	3
Hokkaido University (Kikuchi)	0	0	0	2	0	3	0	0	1	X	6

==== Draw 8 ====
Wednesday, February 5, 9:00

Sheet A	1	2	3	4	5	6	7	8	9	10	Final
(Hokkaido) Loco Solare (Maeda) 🔨	0	2	1	0	1	0	1	0	1	0	6
(Tokyo) Team TANI (Tani)	1	0	0	2	0	2	0	1	0	1	7

Sheet B	1	2	3	4	5	6	7	8	9	10	Final
(Kyoto Prefecture) Team Kyoto CA (Wakabayashi)	1	0	0	1	0	1	0	1	0	X	4
(Hokkaido) KiT Curling Club (Hirata) 🔨	0	5	1	0	1	0	1	0	1	X	9

Sheet C	1	2	3	4	5	6	7	8	9	10	Final
Hokkaido University (Kikuchi)	0	0	2	0	1	1	0	1	0	X	5
(Nagano Prefecture) TM Karuizawa (Morozumi) 🔨	2	2	0	2	0	0	2	0	2	X	10

Sheet D	1	2	3	4	5	6	7	8	9	10	Final
(Nagano Prefecture) Nagano CA (Matsuura) 🔨	0	1	0	0	1	0	0	0	0	X	2
(Hokkaido) Consadole (Abe)	0	0	2	0	0	1	1	0	2	X	6

==== Draw 10 ====
Wednesday, February 5, 18:00

Sheet A	1	2	3	4	5	6	7	8	9	10	Final
(Hokkaido) KiT Curling Club (Hirata) 🔨	2	1	1	2	0	3	X	X	X	X	9
(Nagano Prefecture) Nagano CA (Matsuura)	0	0	0	0	1	0	X	X	X	X	1

Sheet B	1	2	3	4	5	6	7	8	9	10	Final
(Hokkaido) Consadole (Abe) 🔨	0	2	0	2	3	0	0	1	0	X	8
(Aomori Prefecture) Team Sato (Sato)	1	0	2	0	0	2	1	0	0	X	6

Sheet C	1	2	3	4	5	6	7	8	9	10	Final
(Tokyo) Team TANI (Tani)	0	1	0	1	0	1	1	0	1	1	6
(Nagano Prefecture) SC Karuizawa Club (Yanagisawa) 🔨	2	0	2	0	2	0	0	1	0	0	7

Sheet D	1	2	3	4	5	6	7	8	9	10	Final
(Nagano Prefecture) TM Karuizawa (Morozumi)	0	0	0	1	1	0	0	0	1	0	3
(Hokkaido) Loco Solare (Maeda) 🔨	0	1	1	0	0	0	0	1	0	1	4

=== Championship round standings ===
Final Round Robin Standings

Key
Teams to Playoffs (Top 3)

Championship Round
Pos	Team	Skip	W	L	W–L	DSC
C2	(Nagano Prefecture) SC Karuizawa Club	Riku Yanagisawa	4	1	1–0	28.96
D1	(Hokkaido) Consadole	Shinya Abe	4	1	0–1	42.78
C3	(Hokkaido) Loco Solare	Takumi Maeda	3	2	–	28.98
D2	(Hokkaido) KiT Curling Club	Kohsuke Hirata	2	3	–	40.45
D3	(Nagano Prefecture) Nagano CA	Rui Matsuura	1	4	1–0	54.83
C1	(Nagano Prefecture) TM Karuizawa	Yusuke Morozumi	1	4	0–1	30.27

Championship Round Robin Summary Table
Pos.	Team	(Hokkaido) C	(Hokkaido) KCC	(Hokkaido) LS	(Nagano Prefecture) NCA	(Nagano Prefecture) SCKC	(Nagano Prefecture) TMK	Record
2	(Hokkaido) Consadole (Abe)	—	8–4	6–5	6–2	6–7	9–7	4–1
4	(Hokkaido) KiT Curling Club (Hirata)	4–8	—	6–10	9–1	9–11	6–5	2–3
3	(Hokkaido) Loco Solare (Maeda)	5–6	10–6	—	7–3	4–6	4–3	3–2
5	(Nagano Prefecture) Nagano CA (Matsuura)	2–6	1–9	3–7	—	8–10	9–4	1–4
1	(Nagano Prefecture) SC Karuizawa Club (Yanagisawa)	7–6	11–9	6–4	10–8	—	6–7	4–1
6	(Nagano Prefecture) TM Karuizawa (Morozumi)	7–9	5–6	3–4	4–9	7–6	—	1–4

=== Championship round results ===
All draws are listed in Japan Standard Time (UTC+09:00).

==== Draw 12 ====
Thursday, February 6, 13:30

Sheet A	1	2	3	4	5	6	7	8	9	10	Final
(Nagano Prefecture) TM Karuizawa (Morozumi) 🔨	2	0	0	1	0	0	0	1	X	X	4
(Nagano Prefecture) Nagano CA (Matsuura)	0	1	1	0	4	2	1	0	X	X	9

Sheet B	1	2	3	4	5	6	7	8	9	10	11	Final
(Hokkaido) Loco Solare (Maeda) 🔨	1	0	0	0	1	0	0	0	3	0	0	5
(Hokkaido) Consadole (Abe)	0	0	1	2	0	0	0	1	0	1	1	6

Sheet C	1	2	3	4	5	6	7	8	9	10	Final
(Nagano Prefecture) SC Karuizawa Club (Yanagisawa) 🔨	0	1	0	0	4	0	0	3	0	3	11
(Hokkaido) KiT Curling Club (Hirata)	1	0	4	1	0	2	0	0	1	0	9

==== Draw 14 ====
Friday, February 7, 9:00

Sheet A	1	2	3	4	5	6	7	8	9	10	11	Final
(Hokkaido) Consadole (Abe) 🔨	0	1	1	0	2	0	1	0	0	1	0	6
(Nagano Prefecture) SC Karuizawa Club (Yanagisawa)	0	0	0	2	0	2	0	1	1	0	1	7

Sheet B	1	2	3	4	5	6	7	8	9	10	Final
(Hokkaido) KiT Curling Club (Hirata)	0	0	2	0	2	0	0	0	1	1	6
(Nagano Prefecture) TM Karuizawa (Morozumi) 🔨	1	0	0	1	0	1	1	1	0	0	5

Sheet C	1	2	3	4	5	6	7	8	9	10	Final
(Nagano Prefecture) Nagano CA (Matsuura) 🔨	1	1	0	0	0	0	0	1	X	X	3
(Hokkaido) Loco Solare (Maeda)	0	0	2	1	1	1	2	0	X	X	7

==== Draw 16 ====
Friday, February 7, 18:00

Sheet A	1	2	3	4	5	6	7	8	9	10	Final
(Hokkaido) Loco Solare (Maeda) 🔨	4	0	1	0	1	0	1	0	1	2	10
(Hokkaido) KiT Curling Club (Hirata)	0	1	0	1	0	2	0	2	0	0	6

Sheet B	1	2	3	4	5	6	7	8	9	10	Final
(Nagano Prefecture) SC Karuizawa Club (Yanagisawa)	0	2	0	3	0	3	2	0	0	X	10
(Nagano Prefecture) Nagano CA (Matsuura) 🔨	2	0	2	0	2	0	0	2	0	X	8

Sheet C	1	2	3	4	5	6	7	8	9	10	Final
(Nagano Prefecture) TM Karuizawa (Morozumi) 🔨	1	0	3	0	0	1	0	1	0	1	7
(Hokkaido) Consadole (Abe)	0	1	0	4	1	0	1	0	2	0	9

=== Playoffs ===
Semifinal			Final
			1	(Nagano Prefecture) SC Karuizawa Club	7
2	(Hokkaido) Consadole	4	3	(Hokkaido) Loco Solare	5
3	(Hokkaido) Loco Solare	5

==== Semifinal ====
Saturday, February 8, 13:30

Sheet B	1	2	3	4	5	6	7	8	9	10	Final
(Hokkaido) Consadole (Abe) 🔨	0	0	0	1	0	3	0	0	0	0	4
(Hokkaido) Loco Solare (Maeda)	0	0	0	0	1	0	2	0	1	1	5

==== Final ====
Sunday, February 9, 10:00

Sheet C	1	2	3	4	5	6	7	8	9	10	Final
(Nagano Prefecture) SC Karuizawa Club (Yanagisawa) 🔨	1	0	1	0	1	0	2	0	1	1	7
(Hokkaido) Loco Solare (Maeda)	0	2	0	2	0	1	0	0	0	0	5

== Women ==
=== Qualification ===
The following teams qualified to participate in the 2025 Japan Curling Championship:

Qualification method	Berths	Qualifying team(s)
2024 Champion	1	(Nagano Prefecture) SC Karuizawa Club
2024 Runner-Up	1	Hokkaido Bank
Committee Recommendation	3	(Hokkaido) Loco Solare (Nagano Prefecture) Chubu Electric Power (Hokkaido) Fortius
Hokkaido Region	1	(Hokkaido) Sapporo International University
Tōhoku Region	1	(Aomori Prefecture) Philoseek Aomori
Kanto Region	1	Tokyo Association
Chūbu Region	1	(Nagano Prefecture) Team Miyota
West Japan Region	1	(Kyoto Prefecture) Team Osaka
TOTAL	10	

=== Teams ===
The teams are listed as follows:

Team	Skip	Third	Second	Lead	Alternate	Locale
Chubu Electric Power	Ikue Kitazawa	Seina Nakajima	Ami Enami	Minori Suzuki	Hasumi Ishigooka	(Nagano Prefecture) Nagano
Fortius	Sayaka Yoshimura	Kaho Onodera	Yuna Kotani	Anna Ohmiya	Mina Kobayashi	(Hokkaido) Sapporo
Hokkaido Bank	Momoha Tabata (Fourth)	Miku Nihira (Skip)	Sae Yamamoto	Mikoto Nakajima	Ayami Ito	(Hokkaido) Sapporo
Loco Solare	Satsuki Fujisawa	Chinami Yoshida	Yumi Suzuki	Yurika Yoshida	Yako Matsuzawa	(Hokkaido) Kitami
Philoseek Aomori	Misaki Tanaka (Fourth)	Haruka Kihara	Miori Nakamura (Skip)	Hiyori Ichinohe	Yuna Harada	(Aomori Prefecture) Aomori
Sapporo International University	Kohane Tsuruga	Aone Nakamura	Suzuki Rin	Kotoka Segawa	Yumeka Mori	(Hokkaido) Sapporo
SC Karuizawa Club	Miyu Ueno	Yui Ueno	Junko Nishimuro	Asuka Kanai		(Nagano Prefecture) Karuizawa
Team Miyota	Kai Tsuchiya	Erika Ohtani	Manami Anzai	Yumiko Kashiwagi	Mikiko Tsuchiya	(Nagano Prefecture) Nagano
Team Osaka	Ayaka Shimba	Keiko Watanabe	Kotomi Hatayama	Yui Kasahara	Yuka Yao	(Kyoto Prefecture) Kyoto
Tokyo Association	Yumi Suzuki	Aki Goto	Kyoka Kuramitsu	Miho Fujimori	Luna Miura	Tokyo

=== Round robin standings ===
Final Round Robin Standings

Key
Teams to Championship Round (Top 3 of Each Pool)

Pool A
Team	Skip	W	L	W–L	DSC
Hokkaido Bank	Miku Nihira	3	1	1–0	39.4
(Hokkaido) Loco Solare	Satsuki Fujisawa	3	1	0–1	40.5
(Hokkaido) Sapporo International University	Kohane Tsuruga	2	2	1–0	41.9
(Nagano Prefecture) Chubu Electric Power	Ikue Kitazawa	2	2	0–1	29.8
(Kyoto Prefecture) Team Osaka	Ayaka Shimba	0	4	–	71.9

Pool B
Team	Skip	W	L	W–L	DSC
(Hokkaido) Fortius	Sayaka Yoshimura	4	0	–	21.0
(Nagano Prefecture) Team Miyota	Kai Tsuchiya	2	2	1–1	51.1
(Aomori Prefecture) Philoseek Aomori	Miori Nakamura	2	2	1–1	59.7
(Nagano Prefecture) SC Karuizawa Club	Miyu Ueno	2	2	1–1	86.2
Tokyo Association	Yumi Suzuki	0	4	–	64.4

Pool A Round Robin Summary Table
Pos.	Team	(Nagano Prefecture) CEP	(Hokkaido) HB	(Hokkaido) LS	(Hokkaido) SIU	(Kyoto Prefecture) TO	Record
4	(Nagano Prefecture) Chubu Electric Power (Kitazawa)	—	6–4	5–6	5–7	18–0	2–2
1	Hokkaido Bank (Nihira)	4–6	—	7–5	10–2	14–1	3–1
2	(Hokkaido) Loco Solare (Fujisawa)	6–5	5–7	—	10–3	12–5	3–1
3	(Hokkaido) Sapporo International University (Tsuruga)	7–5	2–10	3–10	—	16–0	2–2
5	(Kyoto Prefecture) Team Osaka (Shimba)	0–18	1–14	5–12	0–16	—	0–4

Pool B Round Robin Summary Table
Pos.	Team	(Hokkaido) F	(Aomori Prefecture) PA	(Nagano Prefecture) SCKC	(Nagano Prefecture) TM	(Tokyo) TA	Record
1	(Hokkaido) Fortius (Yoshimura)	—	7–5	10–4	7–4	12–2	4–0
3	(Aomori Prefecture) Philoseek Aomori (Nakamura)	5–7	—	7–3	5–9	7–3	2–2
4	(Nagano Prefecture) SC Karuizawa Club (Ueno)	4–10	3–7	—	10–2	8–6	2–2
2	(Nagano Prefecture) Team Miyota (Tsuchiya)	4–7	9–5	2–10	—	12–2	2–2
5	Tokyo Association (Suzuki)	2–12	3–7	6–8	2–12	—	0–4

=== Round robin results ===
All draws are listed in Japan Standard Time (UTC+09:00).

==== Draw 1 ====
Sunday, February 2, 16:00

Sheet A	1	2	3	4	5	6	7	8	9	10	Final
(Hokkaido) Sapporo International University (Tsuruga) 🔨	0	2	1	0	0	3	0	0	1	X	7
(Nagano Prefecture) Chubu Electric Power (Kitazawa)	1	0	0	2	0	0	1	1	0	X	5

Sheet B	1	2	3	4	5	6	7	8	9	10	Final
Hokkaido Bank (Nihira) 🔨	1	0	1	0	2	1	0	1	0	1	7
(Hokkaido) Loco Solare (Fujisawa)	0	2	0	1	0	0	1	0	1	0	5

Sheet C	1	2	3	4	5	6	7	8	9	10	Final
(Hokkaido) Fortius (Yoshimura) 🔨	1	1	0	2	1	0	1	1	0	X	7
(Nagano Prefecture) Team Miyota (Tsuchiya)	0	0	1	0	0	1	0	0	2	X	4

Sheet D	1	2	3	4	5	6	7	8	9	10	Final
(Aomori Prefecture) Philoseek Aomori (Nakamura) 🔨	0	0	0	2	1	0	1	0	3	X	7
Tokyo Association (Suzuki)	0	0	0	0	0	1	0	2	0	X	3

==== Draw 3 ====
Monday, February 3, 13:30

Sheet A	1	2	3	4	5	6	7	8	9	10	Final
Tokyo Association (Suzuki)	0	1	0	0	0	0	1	0	X	X	2
(Hokkaido) Fortius (Yoshimura) 🔨	2	0	2	1	3	1	0	3	X	X	12

Sheet B	1	2	3	4	5	6	7	8	9	10	Final
(Kyoto Prefecture) Team Osaka (Shimba)	0	0	0	0	0	0	X	X	X	X	0
(Hokkaido) Sapporo International University (Tsuruga) 🔨	5	2	2	4	3	0	X	X	X	X	16

Sheet C	1	2	3	4	5	6	7	8	9	10	Final
(Nagano Prefecture) SC Karuizawa Club (Ueno) 🔨	0	0	1	0	1	0	0	0	1	X	3
(Aomori Prefecture) Philoseek Aomori (Nakamura)	0	0	0	2	0	3	1	1	0	X	7

Sheet D	1	2	3	4	5	6	7	8	9	10	Final
(Nagano Prefecture) Chubu Electric Power (Kitazawa) 🔨	1	0	1	0	0	1	0	2	0	1	6
Hokkaido Bank (Nihira)	0	1	0	0	1	0	1	0	1	0	4

==== Draw 5 ====
Tuesday, February 4, 9:00

Sheet A	1	2	3	4	5	6	7	8	9	10	Final
(Nagano Prefecture) Team Miyota (Tsuchiya) 🔨	0	2	1	0	1	2	0	3	0	X	9
(Aomori Prefecture) Philoseek Aomori (Nakamura)	0	0	0	2	0	0	2	0	1	X	5

Sheet B	1	2	3	4	5	6	7	8	9	10	Final
Tokyo Association (Suzuki) 🔨	2	0	0	0	3	0	0	1	0	X	6
(Nagano Prefecture) SC Karuizawa Club (Ueno)	0	0	1	1	0	2	4	0	0	X	8

Sheet C	1	2	3	4	5	6	7	8	9	10	Final
(Nagano Prefecture) Chubu Electric Power (Kitazawa) 🔨	3	2	2	1	5	5	X	X	X	X	18
(Kyoto Prefecture) Team Osaka (Shimba)	0	0	0	0	0	0	X	X	X	X	0

Sheet D	1	2	3	4	5	6	7	8	9	10	Final
(Hokkaido) Loco Solare (Fujisawa)	1	3	0	2	0	4	X	X	X	X	10
(Hokkaido) Sapporo International University (Tsuruga) 🔨	0	0	2	0	1	0	X	X	X	X	3

==== Draw 7 ====
Tuesday, February 4, 18:00

Sheet A	1	2	3	4	5	6	7	8	9	10	Final
(Kyoto Prefecture) Team Osaka (Shimba)	0	2	0	0	0	2	1	0	X	X	5
(Hokkaido) Loco Solare (Fujisawa) 🔨	2	0	5	1	2	0	0	2	X	X	12

Sheet B	1	2	3	4	5	6	7	8	9	10	Final
(Aomori Prefecture) Philoseek Aomori (Nakamura)	0	1	0	0	1	0	1	0	2	X	5
(Hokkaido) Fortius (Yoshimura) 🔨	2	0	1	2	0	1	0	1	0	X	7

Sheet C	1	2	3	4	5	6	7	8	9	10	Final
(Hokkaido) Sapporo International University (Tsuruga)	0	0	1	0	1	0	0	0	X	X	2
Hokkaido Bank (Nihira) 🔨	2	1	0	2	0	3	0	2	X	X	10

Sheet D	1	2	3	4	5	6	7	8	9	10	Final
(Nagano Prefecture) SC Karuizawa Club (Ueno)	0	0	1	2	3	1	0	3	X	X	10
(Nagano Prefecture) Team Miyota (Tsuchiya) 🔨	0	1	0	0	0	0	1	0	X	X	2

==== Draw 9 ====
Wednesday, February 5, 13:30

Sheet A	1	2	3	4	5	6	7	8	9	10	Final
Hokkaido Bank (Nihira)	2	3	1	2	0	6	X	X	X	X	14
(Kyoto Prefecture) Team Osaka (Shimba) 🔨	0	0	0	0	1	0	X	X	X	X	1

Sheet B	1	2	3	4	5	6	7	8	9	10	Final
(Nagano Prefecture) Team Miyota (Tsuchiya)	0	2	0	1	2	0	3	2	2	X	12
Tokyo Association (Suzuki) 🔨	1	0	0	0	0	1	0	0	0	X	2

Sheet C	1	2	3	4	5	6	7	8	9	10	Final
(Hokkaido) Loco Solare (Fujisawa)	0	2	0	1	0	1	0	1	0	1	6
(Nagano Prefecture) Chubu Electric Power (Kitazawa) 🔨	0	0	1	0	2	0	1	0	1	0	5

Sheet D	1	2	3	4	5	6	7	8	9	10	Final
(Hokkaido) Fortius (Yoshimura) 🔨	3	0	2	0	2	1	0	1	1	X	10
(Nagano Prefecture) SC Karuizawa Club (Ueno)	0	1	0	2	0	0	1	0	0	X	4

=== Championship round standings ===
Final Round Robin Standings

Key
Teams to Playoffs (Top 3)

Championship Teams
Pos	Team	Skip	W	L	W–L	DSC
B1	(Hokkaido) Fortius	Sayaka Yoshimura	4	1	1–1	18.1
A1	Hokkaido Bank	Miku Nihira	4	1	1–1	26.4
A2	(Hokkaido) Loco Solare	Satsuki Fujisawa	4	1	1–1	27.5
B2	(Nagano Prefecture) Team Miyota	Kai Tsuchiya	1	4	1–1	40.8
A3	(Hokkaido) Sapporo International University	Kohane Tsuruga	1	4	1–1	45.6
B3	(Aomori Prefecture) Philoseek Aomori	Miori Nakamura	1	4	1–1	56.6

Championship Round Robin Summary Table
Pos.	Team	(Hokkaido) F	(Hokkaido) HB	(Hokkaido) LS	(Aomori Prefecture) PA	(Hokkaido) SIU	(Nagano Prefecture) TM	Record
1	(Hokkaido) Fortius (Yoshimura)	—	6–5	6–7	7–5	11–4	7–4	4–1
2	Hokkaido Bank (Nihira)	5–6	—	7–5	11–2	10–2	12–3	4–1
3	(Hokkaido) Loco Solare (Fujisawa)	7–6	5–7	—	12–4	10–3	7–6	4–1
6	(Aomori Prefecture) Philoseek Aomori (Nakamura)	5–7	2–11	4–12	—	10–7	5–9	1–4
5	(Hokkaido) Sapporo International University (Tsuruga)	4–11	2–10	3–10	7–10	—	10–9	1–4
4	(Nagano Prefecture) Team Miyota (Tsuchiya)	4–7	3–12	6–7	9–5	9–10	—	1–4

=== Championship round results ===
All draws are listed in Japan Standard Time (UTC+09:00).

==== Draw 11 ====
Thursday, February 6, 9:00

Sheet B	1	2	3	4	5	6	7	8	9	10	11	Final
(Hokkaido) Loco Solare (Fujisawa) 🔨	2	1	1	0	1	0	1	0	0	0	1	7
(Nagano Prefecture) Team Miyota (Tsuchiya)	0	0	0	1	0	3	0	1	0	1	0	6

Sheet C	1	2	3	4	5	6	7	8	9	10	Final
(Hokkaido) Sapporo International University (Tsuruga) 🔨	3	0	1	0	0	0	0	0	X	X	4
(Hokkaido) Fortius (Yoshimura)	0	2	0	1	1	2	3	2	X	X	11

Sheet D	1	2	3	4	5	6	7	8	9	10	Final
Hokkaido Bank (Nihira) 🔨	0	2	0	1	0	0	3	0	5	X	11
(Aomori Prefecture) Philoseek Aomori (Nakamura)	0	0	0	0	1	0	0	1	0	X	2

==== Draw 13 ====
Thursday, February 6, 18:00

Sheet B	1	2	3	4	5	6	7	8	9	10	Final
(Aomori Prefecture) Philoseek Aomori (Nakamura) 🔨	2	1	1	0	1	0	3	2	0	X	10
(Hokkaido) Sapporo International University (Tsuruga)	0	0	0	4	0	2	0	0	1	X	7

Sheet C	1	2	3	4	5	6	7	8	9	10	Final
(Nagano Prefecture) Team Miyota (Tsuchiya) 🔨	1	0	1	0	0	0	1	0	X	X	3
Hokkaido Bank (Nihira)	0	1	0	3	3	1	0	4	X	X	12

Sheet D	1	2	3	4	5	6	7	8	9	10	Final
(Hokkaido) Fortius (Yoshimura) 🔨	1	1	0	2	0	1	0	0	1	0	6
(Hokkaido) Loco Solare (Fujisawa)	0	0	1	0	1	0	1	1	0	3	7

==== Draw 15 ====
Friday, February 7, 13:30

Sheet B	1	2	3	4	5	6	7	8	9	10	Final
Hokkaido Bank (Nihira)	0	0	1	0	1	0	2	0	1	0	5
(Hokkaido) Fortius (Yoshimura) 🔨	0	1	0	0	0	2	0	2	0	1	6

Sheet C	1	2	3	4	5	6	7	8	9	10	Final
(Aomori Prefecture) Philoseek Aomori (Nakamura)	0	1	0	1	1	0	1	0	X	X	4
(Hokkaido) Loco Solare (Fujisawa) 🔨	3	0	4	0	0	3	0	2	X	X	12

Sheet D	1	2	3	4	5	6	7	8	9	10	11	Final
(Nagano Prefecture) Team Miyota (Tsuchiya) 🔨	2	0	0	1	0	1	0	1	0	4	0	9
(Hokkaido) Sapporo International University (Tsuruga)	0	2	1	0	1	0	2	0	3	0	1	10

=== Playoffs ===
Semifinal			Final
			1	(Hokkaido) Fortius	8
2	Hokkaido Bank	11	2	Hokkaido Bank	7
3	(Hokkaido) Loco Solare	5

==== Semifinal ====
Saturday, February 8, 18:00

Sheet C	1	2	3	4	5	6	7	8	9	10	Final
Hokkaido Bank (Nihira) 🔨	2	0	4	0	0	1	1	3	X	X	11
(Hokkaido) Loco Solare (Fujisawa)	0	2	0	1	2	0	0	0	X	X	5

==== Final ====
Sunday, February 9, 14:30

Sheet B	1	2	3	4	5	6	7	8	9	10	11	Final
(Hokkaido) Fortius (Yoshimura) 🔨	0	1	1	0	0	3	0	0	2	0	1	8
Hokkaido Bank (Nihira)	1	0	0	2	0	0	1	1	0	2	0	7
