= 2024 Japan Curling Championships =

- Host city: Sapporo, Hokkaido
- Arena: Hokkaido Bank Curling Stadium
- Dates: January 28 – February 4
- Men's winner: (Hokkaido) Consadole
- Curling club: Tokoro CC, Tokoro, Hokkaido
- Skip: Shinya Abe
- Fourth: Tetsuro Shimizu
- Second: Haruto Ouchi
- Lead: Sota Tsuruga
- Alternate: Makoto Tsuruga
- Finalist: (Nagano Prefecture) SC Karuizawa Club (Yanagisawa)
- Women's winner: (Nagano Prefecture) SC Karuizawa Club
- Curling club: Karuizawa CC, Karuizawa, Nagano
- Skip: Miyu Ueno
- Third: Asuka Kanai
- Second: Junko Nishimuro
- Lead: Yui Ueno
- Alternate: Mone Ryokawa
- Coach: Yuji Nishimuro
- Finalist: Hokkaido Bank (Nihira)

The 2024 Japan Curling Championships (branded as the 41st Zen-Noh Japan Curling Championships) were held from January 28 to February 4 at the Hokkaido Bank Curling Stadium in Sapporo, Hokkaido, Japan. The winning teams earned the right to represent Japan at the 2024 World Men's Curling Championship and the 2024 World Women's Curling Championship respectively.

Both the men's and women's events were played in three rounds, a change in format from previous years. Similar to the Manitoba Scotties Tournament of Hearts, the ten teams were split into two pools of five. The top three teams in each group advanced to the championship round where they crossed over and played the three teams from the opposing pool. Following the conclusion of the championship round, the first-place team advanced directly to the final with the second and third place teams playing in the semifinal.

== Medalists ==
	Gold	Silver	Bronze
Men	(Hokkaido) Consadole; Tetsuro Shimizu (Fourth); Shinya Abe (Skip); Haruto Ouchi; Sota Tsuruga; Makoto Tsuruga	(Nagano Prefecture) SC Karuizawa Club; Riku Yanagisawa; Tsuyoshi Yamaguchi; Takeru Yamamoto; Satoshi Koizumi	(Hokkaido) Loco Solare; Takumi Maeda; Asei Nakahara; Hiroki Maeda; Uryu Kamikawa; Ryoji Onodera
Women	(Nagano Prefecture) SC Karuizawa Club; Miyu Ueno; Asuka Kanai; Junko Nishimuro; Yui Ueno; Mone Ryokawa	Hokkaido Bank; Momoha Tabata (Fourth); Miku Nihira (Skip); Sae Yamamoto; Mikoto Nakajima; Ayami Ito	(Nagano Prefecture) Chubu Electric Power; Ikue Kitazawa; Seina Nakajima; Ami Enami; Minori Suzuki; Hasumi Ishigooka

== Men ==
=== Qualification ===
The following teams qualified to participate in the 2024 Japan Curling Championship:

Qualification method	Berths	Qualifying team(s)
2023 Champion	1	(Nagano Prefecture) SC Karuizawa Club
2023 Runner-Up	1	(Hokkaido) Kitami Association
Hokkaido Region	1	(Hokkaido) Loco Solare
Tōhoku Region	1	(Aomori Prefecture) Team Sato
Kanto Region	1	(Tokyo) Team Tani
Chūbu Region	1	(Nagano Prefecture) SC Karuizawa Club Jr.
West Japan Region	1	(Okayama Prefecture) Okayama CA
Committee Recommendation	3	(Nagano Prefecture) TM Karuizawa (Hokkaido) Sapporo International University (Hokkaido) Consadole
TOTAL	10	

=== Teams ===
The teams are listed as follows:

Team	Skip	Third	Second	Lead	Alternate	Locale
Consadole	Tetsuro Shimizu (Fourth)	Shinya Abe (Skip)	Haruto Ouchi	Sota Tsuruga	Makoto Tsuruga	(Hokkaido) Kitami
Kitami Association	Kohsuke Hirata	Shingo Usui	Ryota Meguro	Yoshiya Miura	Kosuke Aita	(Hokkaido) Kitami
Loco Solare	Takumi Maeda	Asei Nakahara	Hiroki Maeda	Uryu Kamikawa	Ryoji Onodera	(Hokkaido) Kitami
Okayama CA	Hiroki Yoshioka (Fourth)	Hiromitsu Fujinaka (Skip)	Sota Todori	Yusuke Nonomura	Makoto Takahashi	(Okayama Prefecture) Okayama
Sapporo International University	Go Aoki (Fourth)	Hayato Sato (Skip)	Kouki Ogiwara	Yousuke Abe	Shunta Kobayashi	(Hokkaido) Sapporo
SC Karuizawa Club	Riku Yanagisawa	Tsuyoshi Yamaguchi	Takeru Yamamoto	Satoshi Koizumi		(Nagano Prefecture) Karuizawa
SC Karuizawa Club Jr.	Miki Yamamoto (Fourth)	Konosuke Takahashi (Skip)	Shunsuke Kanagawa	Taiki Tozawa	Miharu Kubota	(Nagano Prefecture) Karuizawa
Team Sato	Koei Sato	Kaishi Sato	Akiatsu Yoshimoto	Yuto Abe	Tomoya Kawamura	(Aomori Prefecture) Aomori
Team Tani	Ryutaro Tani	Shunta Mizukami	Takuya Ishikawa	Daiki Yamazaki	Kohei Okamura	Tokyo
TM Karuizawa	Yusuke Morozumi	Yuta Matsumura	Ryotaro Shukuya	Masaki Iwai		(Nagano Prefecture) Karuizawa

=== Round robin standings ===
Final Round Robin Standings

Key
Teams to Championship Round

Pool A
Team	Skip	W	L	PF	PA	EW	EL	BE	SE	DSC
(Hokkaido) Loco Solare	Takumi Maeda	4	0	33	17	19	13	3	7	27.4
(Nagano Prefecture) TM Karuizawa	Yusuke Morozumi	3	1	33	19	17	13	5	6	17.0
(Hokkaido) Kitami Association	Kohsuke Hirata	2	2	29	27	17	14	2	4	21.4
(Hokkaido) Sapporo University	Hayato Sato	1	3	26	33	15	19	5	2	46.0
(Okayama Prefecture) Okayama CA	Hiromitsu Fujinaka	0	4	12	37	9	18	5	0	45.8

Pool B
Team	Skip	W	L	PF	PA	EW	EL	BE	SE	DSC
(Hokkaido) Consadole	Shinya Abe	4	0	35	8	14	7	5	4	44.4
(Nagano Prefecture) SC Karuizawa Club	Riku Yanagisawa	3	1	39	12	16	6	4	10	21.9
(Nagano Prefecture) SC Karuizawa Club Jr.	Konosuke Takahashi	2	2	14	26	10	12	8	4	49.9
(Aomori Prefecture) Team Sato	Koei Sato	1	3	15	36	11	16	0	2	52.6
(Tokyo) Team Tani	Ryutaro Tani	0	4	17	38	12	22	2	2	76.6

=== Round robin results ===
All draws are listed in Japan Standard Time (UTC+09:00).

==== Draw 2 ====
Monday, January 29, 9:00

Sheet A	1	2	3	4	5	6	7	8	9	10	11	Final
(Hokkaido) Loco Solare (Maeda)	2	0	0	1	0	2	0	0	1	0	1	7
(Hokkaido) Sapporo International University (Sato)	0	1	0	0	1	0	1	1	0	2	0	6

Sheet B	1	2	3	4	5	6	7	8	9	10	Final
(Nagano Prefecture) TM Karuizawa (Morozumi)	2	0	0	2	2	0	3	3	X	X	12
(Okayama Prefecture) Okayama CA (Fujinaka)	0	1	0	0	0	2	0	0	X	X	3

Sheet D	1	2	3	4	5	6	7	8	9	10	Final
(Tokyo) Team Tani (Tani)	0	0	1	0	0	0	0	2	0	X	3
(Nagano Prefecture) SC Karuizawa Club (Yanagisawa)	2	0	0	2	1	1	1	0	4	X	11

Sheet E	1	2	3	4	5	6	7	8	9	10	Final
(Aomori Prefecture) Team Sato (Sato)	0	0	0	0	1	0	0	0	0	X	1
(Nagano Prefecture) SC Karuizawa Club Jr. (Takahashi)	0	0	0	2	0	0	0	1	2	X	5

==== Draw 4 ====
Monday, January 29, 19:00

Sheet A	1	2	3	4	5	6	7	8	9	10	Final
(Nagano Prefecture) SC Karuizawa Club Jr. (Takahashi)	0	1	0	0	2	1	1	2	0	0	7
(Tokyo) Team Tani (Tani)	1	0	1	0	0	0	0	0	2	1	5

Sheet B	1	2	3	4	5	6	7	8	9	10	Final
(Hokkaido) Kitami Association (Hirata)	1	0	1	0	1	2	0	2	0	0	7
(Hokkaido) Loco Solare (Maeda)	0	2	0	3	0	0	3	0	0	2	10

Sheet D	1	2	3	4	5	6	7	8	9	10	Final
(Hokkaido) Consadole (Abe)	1	0	0	3	2	0	2	X	X	X	8
(Aomori Prefecture) Team Sato (Sato)	0	1	0	0	0	1	0	X	X	X	2

Sheet E	1	2	3	4	5	6	7	8	9	10	Final
(Hokkaido) Sapporo International University (Sato)	0	1	0	2	0	2	0	0	0	X	5
(Nagano Prefecture) TM Karuizawa (Morozumi)	0	0	3	0	2	0	2	1	3	X	11

==== Draw 6 ====
Tuesday, January 30, 13:30

Sheet A	1	2	3	4	5	6	7	8	9	10	Final
(Nagano Prefecture) SC Karuizawa Club (Yanagisawa)	3	6	4	1	0	3	X	X	X	X	17
(Aomori Prefecture) Team Sato (Sato)	0	0	0	0	1	0	X	X	X	X	1

Sheet B	1	2	3	4	5	6	7	8	9	10	Final
(Nagano Prefecture) SC Karuizawa Club Jr. (Takahashi)	0	0	0	1	0	1	0	X	X	X	2
(Hokkaido) Consadole (Abe)	0	0	1	0	6	0	3	X	X	X	10

Sheet D	1	2	3	4	5	6	7	8	9	10	11	Final
(Hokkaido) Sapporo International University (Sato)	0	3	0	2	0	0	0	0	0	2	0	7
(Hokkaido) Kitami Association (Hirata)	2	0	2	0	2	1	0	0	0	0	3	10

Sheet E	1	2	3	4	5	6	7	8	9	10	Final
(Okayama Prefecture) Okayama CA (Fujinaka)	0	0	0	0	0	1	0	X	X	X	1
(Hokkaido) Loco Solare (Maeda)	2	1	1	2	1	0	3	X	X	X	10

==== Draw 8 ====
Wednesday, January 31, 9:00

Sheet A	1	2	3	4	5	6	7	8	9	10	Final
(Hokkaido) Kitami Association (Hirata)	0	0	0	0	3	1	3	0	0	X	7
(Okayama Prefecture) Okayama CA (Fujinaka)	0	0	0	1	0	0	0	2	0	X	3

Sheet B	1	2	3	4	5	6	7	8	9	10	11	Final
(Aomori Prefecture) Team Sato (Sato)	1	1	0	1	1	0	1	0	1	0	5	11
(Tokyo) Team Tani (Tani)	0	0	2	0	0	1	0	2	0	1	0	6

Sheet D	1	2	3	4	5	6	7	8	9	10	Final
(Hokkaido) Loco Solare (Maeda)	0	1	0	1	0	1	3	0	0	X	6
(Nagano Prefecture) TM Karuizawa (Morozumi)	0	0	0	0	2	0	0	0	1	X	3

Sheet E	1	2	3	4	5	6	7	8	9	10	Final
(Hokkaido) Consadole (Abe)	2	0	0	0	0	3	3	X	X	X	8
(Nagano Prefecture) SC Karuizawa Club (Yanagisawa)	0	0	0	1	0	0	0	X	X	X	1

==== Draw 10 ====
Wednesday, January 31, 18:00

Sheet A	1	2	3	4	5	6	7	8	9	10	Final
(Tokyo) Team Tani (Tani)	0	0	2	0	0	1	0	X	X	X	3
(Hokkaido) Consadole (Abe)	3	1	0	0	1	0	4	X	X	X	9

Sheet B	1	2	3	4	5	6	7	8	9	10	Final
(Nagano Prefecture) SC Karuizawa Club (Yanagisawa)	0	4	1	4	0	1	X	X	X	X	10
(Nagano Prefecture) SC Karuizawa Club Jr. (Takahashi)	0	0	0	0	0	0	X	X	X	X	0

Sheet D	1	2	3	4	5	6	7	8	9	10	Final
(Okayama Prefecture) Okayama CA (Fujinaka)	1	0	1	0	1	0	0	2	0	0	5
(Hokkaido) Sapporo International University (Sato)	0	2	0	3	0	0	1	0	0	2	8

Sheet E	1	2	3	4	5	6	7	8	9	10	Final
(Nagano Prefecture) TM Karuizawa (Morozumi)	0	2	1	2	0	0	1	0	1	0	7
(Hokkaido) Kitami Association (Hirata)	1	0	0	0	0	2	0	1	0	1	5

=== Championship round standings ===
Final Championship Round Standings

Key
Teams to Playoffs

Team	Skip	W	L	W–L	PF	PA	EW	EL	BE	SE
(Hokkaido) Consadole	Shinya Abe	7	0	–	61	28	28	18	7	7
(Hokkaido) Loco Solare	Takumi Maeda	6	1	–	56	34	31	24	7	11
(Nagano Prefecture) SC Karuizawa Club	Riku Yanagisawa	5	2	–	60	32	29	17	8	13
(Nagano Prefecture) TM Karuizawa	Yusuke Morozumi	4	3	–	61	41	30	25	5	8
(Hokkaido) Kitami Association	Kohsuke Hirata	3	4	–	42	40	26	22	7	8
(Nagano Prefecture) SC Karuizawa Club Jr.	Konosuke Takahashi	2	5	–	19	50	14	24	11	5

=== Championship round results ===
==== Draw 12 ====
Thursday, February 1, 13:30

Sheet A	1	2	3	4	5	6	7	8	9	10	Final
(Hokkaido) Loco Solare (Maeda)	2	0	0	0	0	0	2	1	1	X	6
(Nagano Prefecture) SC Karuizawa Club Jr. (Takahashi)	0	1	0	1	0	0	0	0	0	X	2

Sheet B	1	2	3	4	5	6	7	8	9	10	Final
(Hokkaido) Kitami Association (Hirata)	1	0	1	1	0	0	0	2	0	0	5
(Hokkaido) Consadole (Abe)	0	1	0	0	2	0	1	0	0	2	6

Sheet D	1	2	3	4	5	6	7	8	9	10	Final
(Nagano Prefecture) TM Karuizawa (Morozumi)	0	1	0	1	0	0	3	0	2	0	7
(Nagano Prefecture) SC Karuizawa Club (Yanagisawa)	1	0	1	0	0	2	0	3	0	1	8

==== Draw 14 ====
Friday, February 2, 9:00

Sheet A	1	2	3	4	5	6	7	8	9	10	Final
(Hokkaido) Consadole (Abe)	2	0	3	0	0	1	0	2	0	3	11
(Nagano Prefecture) TM Karuizawa (Morozumi)	0	3	0	1	1	0	3	0	2	0	10

Sheet B	1	2	3	4	5	6	7	8	9	10	Final
(Nagano Prefecture) SC Karuizawa Club (Yanagisawa)	0	1	1	0	0	0	1	0	3	0	6
(Hokkaido) Loco Solare (Maeda)	1	0	0	3	1	1	0	1	0	5	12

Sheet D	1	2	3	4	5	6	7	8	9	10	Final
(Nagano Prefecture) SC Karuizawa Club Jr. (Takahashi)	0	0	0	0	0	0	0	X	X	X	0
(Hokkaido) Kitami Association (Hirata)	0	0	3	0	1	2	1	X	X	X	7

==== Draw 16 ====
Friday, February 2, 18:00

Sheet A	1	2	3	4	5	6	7	8	9	10	Final
(Hokkaido) Kitami Association (Hirata)	0	0	0	0	0	1	0	0	0	X	1
(Nagano Prefecture) SC Karuizawa Club (Yanagisawa)	0	0	0	1	0	0	2	3	1	X	7

Sheet B	1	2	3	4	5	6	7	8	9	10	Final
(Nagano Prefecture) TM Karuizawa (Morozumi)	3	0	3	0	2	3	X	X	X	X	11
(Nagano Prefecture) SC Karuizawa Club Jr. (Takahashi)	0	1	0	2	0	0	X	X	X	X	3

Sheet D	1	2	3	4	5	6	7	8	9	10	Final
(Hokkaido) Loco Solare (Maeda)	0	0	0	3	0	0	2	0	0	X	5
(Hokkaido) Consadole (Abe)	2	0	1	0	3	1	0	0	2	X	9

=== Playoffs ===
Semifinal			Final
			1	(Hokkaido) Consadole	8
2	(Hokkaido) Loco Solare	5	3	(Nagano Prefecture) SC Karuizawa Club	3
3	(Nagano Prefecture) SC Karuizawa Club	8

==== Semifinal ====
Saturday, February 3, 13:30

Sheet B	1	2	3	4	5	6	7	8	9	10	Final
(Hokkaido) Loco Solare (Maeda)	0	0	2	0	0	2	1	0	0	X	5
(Nagano Prefecture) SC Karuizawa Club (Yanagisawa)	1	1	0	0	2	0	0	3	1	X	8

==== Final ====
Sunday, February 4, 10:00

Sheet D	1	2	3	4	5	6	7	8	9	10	Final
(Hokkaido) Consadole (Abe)	0	0	2	3	1	0	0	1	1	X	8
(Nagano Prefecture) SC Karuizawa Club (Yanagisawa)	0	1	0	0	0	1	1	0	0	X	3

2024 Japan Curling Championships
(Japan)
Shinya Abe
5th Japanese Championship title

=== Final standings ===
Place	Team	Skip
1st place, gold medalist(s)	(Hokkaido) Consadole	Shinya Abe
2nd place, silver medalist(s)	(Nagano Prefecture) SC Karuizawa Club	Riku Yanagisawa
3rd place, bronze medalist(s)	(Hokkaido) Loco Solare	Takumi Maeda
4	(Nagano Prefecture) TM Karuizawa	Yusuke Morozumi
5	(Hokkaido) Kitami Association	Kohsuke Hirata
6	(Nagano Prefecture) SC Karuizawa Club Jr.	Konosuke Takahashi
7	(Hokkaido) Sapporo International University	Hayato Sato
8	(Aomori Prefecture) Team Sato	Koei Sato
9	(Okayama Prefecture) Okayama CA	Hiromitsu Fujinaka
10	(Tokyo) Team Tani	Ryutaro Tani

== Women ==
=== Qualification ===
The following teams qualified to participate in the 2024 Japan Curling Championship:

Qualification method	Berths	Qualifying team(s)
2023 Champion	1	(Hokkaido) Loco Solare
2023 Runner-Up	1	(Nagano Prefecture) SC Karuizawa Club
Hokkaido Region	1	Hokkaido Bank
Tōhoku Region	1	(Iwate Prefecture) Iwate Institute
Kanto Region	1	(Tokyo) Grandir
Chūbu Region	1	(Nagano Prefecture) SC Karuizawa Club Jr.
West Japan Region	1	(Hiroshima Prefecture) Team Hiroshima
Committee Recommendation	3	(Nagano Prefecture) Chubu Electric Power (Hokkaido) Fortius (Hokkaido) Loco Solare.S
TOTAL	10	

=== Teams ===
The teams are listed as follows:

Team	Skip	Third	Second	Lead	Alternate	Locale
Chubu Electric Power	Ikue Kitazawa	Seina Nakajima	Ami Enami	Minori Suzuki	Hasumi Ishigooka	(Nagano Prefecture) Nagano
Fortius	Yuna Kotani	Kaho Onodera	Anna Ohmiya	Mina Kobayashi	Yumie Funayama	(Hokkaido) Sapporo
Grandir	Yui Ozeki	Mao Ishigaki	Reika Tateda	Hinako Sonobe	Haruka Hosoda	Tokyo
Hokkaido Bank	Momoha Tabata (Fourth)	Miku Nihira (Skip)	Sae Yamamoto	Mikoto Nakajima	Ayami Ito	(Hokkaido) Sapporo
Iwate Institute	Kotoka Segawa	Michiko Tomabechi	Rio Matsubara	Mei Shimohori		(Iwate Prefecture) Iwate
Loco Solare	Satsuki Fujisawa	Chinami Yoshida	Yumi Suzuki	Yurika Yoshida	Kotomi Ishizaki	(Hokkaido) Kitami
Loco Solare.S	Honoka Sasaki	Mari Motohashi	Miki Hayashi	Mayumi Saito	Yako Matsuzawa	(Hokkaido) Kitami
SC Karuizawa Club	Miyu Ueno	Asuka Kanai	Junko Nishimuro	Yui Ueno	Mone Ryokawa	(Nagano Prefecture) Nagano
SC Karuizawa Club Jr.	Aoi Watanabe	Koharu Arai	Seira Shinohara	Rin Shigihara	Ai Kawada	(Nagano Prefecture) Nagano
Team Hiroshima	Riho Zaikan	Haruna Yamauchi	Sachi Fukuoka	Tomoko Tsuda		(Hiroshima Prefecture) Hiroshima

=== Round robin standings ===
Final Round Robin Standings

Key
Teams to Championship Round

Pool A
Team	Skip	W	L	W–L	PF	PA	EW	EL	BE	SE	DSC
(Hokkaido) Fortius	Yuna Kotani	3	1	1–1	36	16	21	10	0	9	36.8
(Nagano Prefecture) Chubu Electric Power	Ikue Kitazawa	3	1	1–1	32	16	18	12	3	6	43.4
(Nagano Prefecture) SC Karuizawa Club	Miyu Ueno	3	1	1–1	32	17	16	13	4	3	56.4
(Nagano Prefecture) SC Karuizawa Club Jr.	Aoi Watanabe	1	3	–	18	35	11	18	0	2	104.0
(Hiroshima Prefecture) Team Hiroshima	Riho Zaikan	0	4	–	10	44	8	21	2	0	85.5

Pool B
Team	Skip	W	L	W–L	PF	PA	EW	EL	BE	SE	DSC
(Hokkaido) Loco Solare	Satsuki Fujisawa	4	0	–	30	19	19	14	2	7	52.3
Hokkaido Bank	Miku Nihira	3	1	–	31	15	15	14	1	9	62.7
(Hokkaido) Loco Solare.S	Honoka Sasaki	2	2	–	20	26	13	15	5	2	41.1
(Tokyo) Grandir	Yui Ozeki	1	3	–	23	26	16	18	1	4	106.6
(Iwate Prefecture) Iwate Institute	Kotoka Segawa	0	4	–	19	37	16	18	0	4	68.9

=== Round robin results ===
All draws are listed in Japan Standard Time (UTC+09:00).

==== Draw 1 ====
Sunday, January 28, 17:00

Sheet A	1	2	3	4	5	6	7	8	9	10	Final
(Hiroshima Prefecture) Team Hiroshima (Zaikan)	0	1	0	1	0	1	0	0	X	X	3
(Nagano Prefecture) Chubu Electric Power (Kitazawa)	1	0	5	0	1	0	4	1	X	X	12

Sheet B	1	2	3	4	5	6	7	8	9	10	Final
(Nagano Prefecture) SC Karuizawa Club Jr. (Watanabe)	0	0	0	1	0	2	0	0	X	X	3
(Nagano Prefecture) SC Karuizawa Club (Ueno)	1	1	4	0	3	0	0	2	X	X	11

Sheet D	1	2	3	4	5	6	7	8	9	10	Final
(Hokkaido) Loco Solare.S (Sasaki)	0	0	0	0	0	1	0	1	X	X	2
(Hokkaido) Loco Solare (Fujisawa)	2	0	1	0	3	0	2	0	X	X	8

Sheet E	1	2	3	4	5	6	7	8	9	10	Final
(Tokyo) Grandir (Ozeki)	0	0	1	0	1	1	0	0	1	X	4
Hokkaido Bank (Nihira)	2	0	0	0	0	0	3	1	0	X	6

==== Draw 3 ====
Monday, January 29, 13:30

Sheet A	1	2	3	4	5	6	7	8	9	10	Final
Hokkaido Bank (Nihira)	0	0	2	5	3	0	1	0	X	X	11
(Hokkaido) Loco Solare.S (Sasaki)	0	0	0	0	0	1	0	1	X	X	2

Sheet B	1	2	3	4	5	6	7	8	9	10	Final
(Hokkaido) Fortius (Kotani)	1	5	1	2	1	2	X	X	X	X	12
(Hiroshima Prefecture) Team Hiroshima (Zaikan)	0	0	0	0	0	0	X	X	X	X	0

Sheet D	1	2	3	4	5	6	7	8	9	10	Final
(Iwate Prefecture) Iwate Institute (Segawa)	2	0	1	0	2	1	0	0	1	X	7
(Tokyo) Grandir (Ozeki)	0	3	0	2	0	0	2	2	0	X	9

Sheet E	1	2	3	4	5	6	7	8	9	10	Final
(Nagano Prefecture) Chubu Electric Power (Kitazawa)	1	1	1	0	2	3	0	1	X	X	9
(Nagano Prefecture) SC Karuizawa Club Jr. (Watanabe)	0	0	0	1	0	0	2	0	X	X	3

==== Draw 5 ====
Tuesday, January 30, 9:00

Sheet A	1	2	3	4	5	6	7	8	9	10	Final
(Hokkaido) Loco Solare (Fujisawa)	1	0	2	0	1	1	0	1	1	X	7
(Tokyo) Grandir (Ozeki)	0	2	0	1	0	0	2	0	0	X	5

Sheet B	1	2	3	4	5	6	7	8	9	10	Final
Hokkaido Bank (Nihira)	2	1	1	0	0	3	2	0	X	X	9
(Iwate Prefecture) Iwate Institute (Segawa)	0	0	0	1	1	0	0	1	X	X	3

Sheet D	1	2	3	4	5	6	7	8	9	10	11	Final
(Nagano Prefecture) Chubu Electric Power (Kitazawa)	0	1	2	0	2	0	0	0	1	0	0	6
(Hokkaido) Fortius (Kotani)	0	0	0	3	0	1	0	1	0	1	1	7

Sheet E	1	2	3	4	5	6	7	8	9	10	Final
(Nagano Prefecture) SC Karuizawa Club (Ueno)	1	0	0	2	2	0	3	0	3	X	11
(Hiroshima Prefecture) Team Hiroshima (Zaikan)	0	0	1	0	0	2	0	1	0	X	4

==== Draw 7 ====
Tuesday, January 30, 18:00

Sheet A	1	2	3	4	5	6	7	8	9	10	Final
(Hokkaido) Fortius (Kotani)	1	0	1	0	1	0	1	0	1	X	5
(Nagano Prefecture) SC Karuizawa Club (Ueno)	0	2	0	1	0	2	0	2	0	X	7

Sheet B	1	2	3	4	5	6	7	8	9	10	Final
(Tokyo) Grandir (Ozeki)	0	0	1	0	1	0	1	1	0	1	5
(Hokkaido) Loco Solare.S (Sasaki)	0	2	0	2	0	1	0	0	1	0	6

Sheet D	1	2	3	4	5	6	7	8	9	10	Final
(Hiroshima Prefecture) Team Hiroshima (Zaikan)	0	2	0	0	0	0	1	0	X	X	3
(Nagano Prefecture) SC Karuizawa Club Jr. (Watanabe)	3	0	3	1	0	1	0	1	X	X	9

Sheet E	1	2	3	4	5	6	7	8	9	10	Final
(Iwate Prefecture) Iwate Institute (Segawa)	2	0	1	1	1	0	0	1	0	1	7
(Hokkaido) Loco Solare (Fujisawa)	0	2	0	0	0	1	3	0	3	0	9

==== Draw 9 ====
Wednesday, January 31, 13:30

Sheet A	1	2	3	4	5	6	7	8	9	10	Final
(Nagano Prefecture) SC Karuizawa Club Jr. (Watanabe)	0	2	0	0	1	0	0	X	X	X	3
(Hokkaido) Fortius (Kotani)	2	0	2	1	0	3	4	X	X	X	12

Sheet B	1	2	3	4	5	6	7	8	9	10	Final
(Hokkaido) Loco Solare (Fujisawa)	0	2	1	0	0	1	1	0	0	1	6
Hokkaido Bank (Nihira)	2	0	0	1	0	0	0	2	0	0	5

Sheet D	1	2	3	4	5	6	7	8	9	10	Final
(Nagano Prefecture) SC Karuizawa Club (Ueno)	0	0	0	1	0	0	0	2	0	X	3
(Nagano Prefecture) Chubu Electric Power (Kitazawa)	1	0	0	0	0	1	0	0	3	X	5

Sheet E	1	2	3	4	5	6	7	8	9	10	Final
(Hokkaido) Loco Solare.S (Sasaki)	1	0	3	3	2	0	1	X	X	X	10
(Iwate Prefecture) Iwate Institute (Segawa)	0	1	0	0	0	1	0	X	X	X	2

=== Championship round standings ===
Final Championship Round Standings

Key
Teams to Playoffs

Team	Skip	W	L	W–L	PF	PA	EW	EL	BE	SE	DSC
Hokkaido Bank	Miku Nihira	6	1	–	51	30	28	25	3	11	60.9
(Nagano Prefecture) Chubu Electric Power	Ikue Kitazawa	5	2	2–0	53	31	32	24	4	11	47.1
(Nagano Prefecture) SC Karuizawa Club	Miyu Ueno	5	2	1–1	53	34	30	22	9	7	51.6
(Hokkaido) Loco Solare	Satsuki Fujisawa	5	2	0–2	49	42	31	29	4	10	36.9
(Hokkaido) Fortius	Yuna Kotani	4	3	–	56	36	34	24	0	13	28.3
(Hokkaido) Loco Solare.S	Honoka Sasaki	2	5	–	33	50	23	30	6	4	57.5

=== Championship round results ===
==== Draw 11 ====
Thursday, February 1, 9:00

Sheet B	1	2	3	4	5	6	7	8	9	10	Final
(Nagano Prefecture) Chubu Electric Power (Kitazawa)	0	2	0	1	0	1	0	2	0	0	6
Hokkaido Bank (Nihira)	2	0	1	0	2	0	1	0	0	1	7

Sheet D	1	2	3	4	5	6	7	8	9	10	Final
(Nagano Prefecture) SC Karuizawa Club (Ueno)	0	2	0	2	1	0	3	1	0	1	10
(Hokkaido) Loco Solare (Fujisawa)	2	0	2	0	0	3	0	0	1	0	8

Sheet E	1	2	3	4	5	6	7	8	9	10	Final
(Hokkaido) Fortius (Kotani)	2	2	0	2	0	2	0	1	0	X	9
(Hokkaido) Loco Solare.S (Sasaki)	0	0	2	0	2	0	1	0	1	X	6

==== Draw 13 ====
Thursday, February 1, 18:00

Sheet B	1	2	3	4	5	6	7	8	9	10	Final
(Hokkaido) Loco Solare.S (Sasaki)	0	0	2	0	1	0	0	0	0	X	3
(Nagano Prefecture) SC Karuizawa Club (Ueno)	0	2	0	2	0	1	0	1	1	X	7

Sheet D	1	2	3	4	5	6	7	8	9	10	Final
Hokkaido Bank (Nihira)	1	0	0	0	1	0	3	1	0	1	7
(Hokkaido) Fortius (Kotani)	0	1	1	0	0	1	0	0	2	0	5

Sheet E	1	2	3	4	5	6	7	8	9	10	Final
(Hokkaido) Loco Solare (Fujisawa)	0	1	0	2	0	1	0	0	0	0	4
(Nagano Prefecture) Chubu Electric Power (Kitazawa)	0	0	1	0	2	0	1	0	1	2	7

==== Draw 15 ====
Friday, February 2, 13:30

Sheet B	1	2	3	4	5	6	7	8	9	10	Final
(Hokkaido) Fortius (Kotani)	0	2	0	2	0	0	0	1	1	0	6
(Hokkaido) Loco Solare (Fujisawa)	0	0	2	0	1	1	1	0	0	2	7

Sheet D	1	2	3	4	5	6	7	8	9	10	Final
(Nagano Prefecture) Chubu Electric Power (Kitazawa)	1	0	0	2	0	0	2	1	2	X	8
(Hokkaido) Loco Solare.S (Sasaki)	0	1	1	0	1	1	0	0	0	X	4

Sheet E	1	2	3	4	5	6	7	8	9	10	Final
(Nagano Prefecture) SC Karuizawa Club (Ueno)	1	0	0	0	0	2	0	0	1	0	4
Hokkaido Bank (Nihira)	0	2	0	0	0	0	3	0	0	1	6

=== Playoffs ===
Semifinal			Final
			1	Hokkaido Bank	4
2	(Nagano Prefecture) Chubu Electric Power	5	3	(Nagano Prefecture) SC Karuizawa Club	5
3	(Nagano Prefecture) SC Karuizawa Club	6

==== Semifinal ====
Saturday, February 3, 18:00

Sheet D	1	2	3	4	5	6	7	8	9	10	Final
(Nagano Prefecture) Chubu Electric Power (Kitazawa)	0	1	0	1	0	1	1	0	1	0	5
(Nagano Prefecture) SC Karuizawa Club (Ueno)	0	0	2	0	1	0	0	1	0	2	6

==== Final ====
Sunday, February 4, 14:30

Sheet B	1	2	3	4	5	6	7	8	9	10	Final
Hokkaido Bank (Nihira)	0	0	0	2	1	0	0	1	0	0	4
(Nagano Prefecture) SC Karuizawa Club (Ueno)	0	1	0	0	0	2	0	0	0	2	5

2024 Japan Curling Championships
(Japan)
Miyu Ueno
1st Japanese Championship title

=== Final standings ===
Place	Team	Skip
1st place, gold medalist(s)	(Nagano Prefecture) SC Karuizawa Club	Miyu Ueno
2nd place, silver medalist(s)	Hokkaido Bank	Miku Nihira
3rd place, bronze medalist(s)	(Nagano Prefecture) Chubu Electric Power	Ikue Kitazawa
4	(Hokkaido) Loco Solare	Satsuki Fujisawa
5	(Hokkaido) Fortius	Yuna Kotani
6	(Hokkaido) Loco Solare.S	Honoka Sasaki
7	(Nagano Prefecture) SC Karuizawa Club Jr.	Aoi Watanabe
8	(Tokyo) Grandir	Yui Ozeki
9	(Iwate Prefecture) Iwate Institute	Kotoka Segawa
10	(Hiroshima Prefecture) Team Hiroshima	Riho Zaikan
