= 2023 Japan Curling Championships =

- Host city: Tokoro, Kitami, Hokkaido
- Arena: Tokoro Curling Club
- Dates: January 29 – February 5
- Men's winner: SC Karuizawa Club
- Curling club: Karuizawa CC, Karuizawa, Nagano
- Skip: Riku Yanagisawa
- Third: Tsuyoshi Yamaguchi
- Second: Takeru Yamamoto
- Lead: Satoshi Koizumi
- Coach: Yuji Nishimuro
- Finalist: Kitami Association (Hirata)
- Women's winner: Loco Solare
- Curling club: Tokoro CC, Tokoro, Hokkaido
- Skip: Satsuki Fujisawa
- Third: Chinami Yoshida
- Second: Yumi Suzuki
- Lead: Yurika Yoshida
- Alternate: Kotomi Ishizaki
- Coach: J. D. Lind, Ryoji Onodera
- Finalist: SC Karuizawa Club (Kanai)

The 2023 Japan Curling Championships (branded as the 40th Zen-Noh Japan Curling Championships) were held from January 29 to February 5 at the Tokoro Curling Club in Tokoro, Kitami, Hokkaido, Japan. Both the men's and women's events were played in a round robin format which qualified four teams for a page playoff.

After being pushed to May in 2022 due to the 2022 Winter Olympics, the championship returned to its normal dates from the end of January to the start of February. The winning teams earned the right to represent Japan at the 2023 World Men's Curling Championship and the 2023 World Women's Curling Championship respectively.

== Summary ==
Both the men's and women's champions from 2022 were able to defend their titles in this year's championship.

On the men's side, SC Karuizawa Club, represented by Riku Yanagisawa, Tsuyoshi Yamaguchi, Takeru Yamamoto and Satoshi Koizumi, won their second consecutive and tenth overall national championship. The team finished 7–1 through the round robin portion of the event, losing their last round robin game to Kitami Association (Kosuka Hirata) who finished first overall at 7–1. In the 1 vs. 2 page playoff, trailing 9–6 after eight ends, SC Karuizawa Club scored two in the ninth end, stole a single in the tenth end, and stole two more in the extra end for an 11–9 victory. Kitami Association went on to defeat Consadole (Shinya Abe) 7–1 in the semifinal to set up a rematch in the gold medal game. SC Karuizawa Club took two in the fourth end to open up a 3–1 lead, and later led 4–2 after eight ends. In the ninth, the defending champions stole two points en route to claiming the national title once again. SC Karuizawa Club qualified Japan for the 2023 World Men's Curling Championship by finishing fourth at the 2022 Pan Continental Curling Championships.

In the women's event, Team Loco Solare, with Satsuki Fujisawa, Chinami Yoshida, Yumi Suzuki, Yurika Yoshida and Kotomi Ishizaki won their second consecutive and fourth national championship since joining for the 2015–16 season. After the round robin, Team Fujisawa finished tied for first with Chubu Electric Power (Ikue Kitazawa) and Philoseek Aomori (Miori Nakamura). Since they had all gone 1–1 against each other, positions for the playoffs were determined through draw to the button totals, which Loco Solare had the best of, followed by Chubu Electric in second and Aomori in third. The playoff picture was complete by SC Karuizawa Club (Asuka Kanai). In the 1 vs. 2 game, Loco Solare came back from a 4–2 deficit, stealing four consecutive ends to defeat Chubu Electric 7–4. SC Karuizawa Club also came from behind in the 3 vs. 4 game, coming back from an 8–1 deficit to win 11–9 thanks to a steal of five in the eighth end. SC Karuizawa Club then beat Chubu Electric 7–6 in the semifinal to eliminate Japan's representative at the previous World Women's Curling Championship. In the final, the Fujisawa rink got out to a 4–0 lead after three ends, eventually taking the championship 7–5 over SC Karuizawa Club. Loco Solare qualified Japan for the 2023 World Women's Curling Championship by winning gold at the 2022 Pan Continental Curling Championships.

== Medalists ==
	Gold	Silver	Bronze
Men	SC Karuizawa Club; Riku Yanagisawa; Tsuyoshi Yamaguchi; Takeru Yamamoto; Satoshi Koizumi	Kitami Association; Kohsuke Hirata; Shingo Usui; Ryota Meguro; Kosuke Aita; Yoshiya Miura	Consadole; Tetsuro Shimizu (Fourth); Haruto Ouchi; Shinya Abe (Skip); Sota Tsuruga; Minori Suzuki
Women	Loco Solare; Satsuki Fujisawa; Chinami Yoshida; Yumi Suzuki; Yurika Yoshida; Kotomi Ishizaki	SC Karuizawa Club; Asuka Kanai; Ami Enami; Junko Nishimuro; Mone Ryokawa; Miyu Ueno	Chubu Electric Power; Ikue Kitazawa; Seina Nakajima; Minori Suzuki; Hasumi Ishigooka; Chiaki Matsumura

== Men ==
=== Qualification ===
The following teams qualified to participate in the 2023 Japan Curling Championship:

Qualification method	Berths	Qualifying team(s)
2022 Champion	1	SC Karuizawa Club
2022 Runner-Up	1	Sapporo International University
Hokkaido Region	1	Kitami Association
Tōhoku Region	1	Miyagi CA
Kanto Region	1	Team Ogiwara
Central Region	1	TM Karuizawa
West Japan Region	1	Okayama CA
Wild Card 1	1	Team Ichimura
Wild Card 2	1	Consadole

=== Teams ===
The teams are listed as follows:

Team	Skip	Third	Second	Lead	Alternate	Locale
Consadole	Tetsuro Shimizu (Fourth)	Haruto Ouchi	Shinya Abe (Skip)	Sota Tsuruga	Minori Suzuki	Kitami
Kitami Association	Kohsuke Hirata	Shingo Usui	Ryota Meguro	Kosuke Aita	Yoshiya Miura	Kitami
Miyagi CA	Kotaro Noguchi	Yuto Kamada	Hiroshi Kato	Yuki Yoshimura	Hayato Fujimura	Miyagi
Okayama CA	Hiroki Yoshioka	Hiromitsu Fujinaka	Yusuke Nonomura	Makoto Takahashi	Atsushi Kamigaito	Okayama
Sapporo International University	Go Aoki (Fourth)	Hayato Sato (Skip)	Kouki Ogiwara	Kazushi Nino	Ayato Sasaki	Sapporo
SC Karuizawa Club	Riku Yanagisawa	Tsuyoshi Yamaguchi	Takeru Yamamoto	Satoshi Koizumi		Karuizawa
Team Ichimura	Takanori Ichimura	Daisuke Sonoyama	Seiji Yamamoto	Miki Yamamoto		Nagano
Team Ogiwara	Ryo Ogiwara	Satoru Tsukamoto	Wataru Henmi	Nobuhito Kasahara	Haruki Watanabe	Tokyo
TM Karuizawa	Yusuke Morozumi	Yuta Matsumura	Ryotaro Shukuya	Kosuke Morozumi		Karuizawa

=== Round robin standings ===
Final Round Robin Standings

Key
Teams to Playoffs

Team	Skip	W	L	W–L	PF	PA	EW	EL	BE	SE	DSC
Kitami Association	Kohsuke Hirata	7	1	1–0	60	36	35	28	4	13	28.05
SC Karuizawa Club	Riku Yanagisawa	7	1	0–1	69	36	36	26	3	13	29.81
Consadole	Shinya Abe	6	2	1–0	68	40	32	26	8	9	30.78
TM Karuizawa	Yusuke Morozumi	6	2	0–1	60	43	38	26	0	14	34.22
Sapporo International University	Hayato Sato	4	4	–	58	43	29	28	4	7	27.93
Miyagi CA	Kotaro Noguchi	3	5	–	49	67	30	35	2	3	47.95
Team Ogiwara	Ryo Ogiwara	2	6	–	41	60	30	35	4	3	37.10
Okayama CA	Hiroki Yoshioka	1	7	–	28	71	24	34	0	5	62.41
Team Ichimura	Takanori Ichimura	0	8	–	28	65	22	38	0	3	75.62

=== Round robin results ===
All draws are listed in Japan Standard Time (UTC+09:00).

==== Draw 1 ====
Sunday, January 29, 9:00

Sheet A	1	2	3	4	5	6	7	8	9	10	Final
Kitami Association (Hirata)	0	1	0	2	2	0	3	3	X	X	11
Miyagi CA (Noguchi) 🔨	0	0	1	0	0	1	0	0	X	X	2

Sheet B	1	2	3	4	5	6	7	8	9	10	Final
Consadole (Abe)	0	2	0	2	1	2	3	X	X	X	10
Team Ogiwara (Ogiwara) 🔨	3	0	1	0	0	0	0	X	X	X	4

Sheet D	1	2	3	4	5	6	7	8	9	10	Final
SC Karuizawa Club (Yanagisawa)	0	0	0	3	0	3	1	2	X	X	9
Sapporo International University (Sato) 🔨	1	1	1	0	1	0	0	0	X	X	4

Sheet E	1	2	3	4	5	6	7	8	9	10	Final
Okayama CA (Yoshioka) 🔨	1	0	3	1	1	1	2	X	X	X	9
Team Ichimura (Ichimura)	0	2	0	0	0	0	0	X	X	X	2

==== Draw 3 ====
Sunday, January 29, 18:00

Sheet A	1	2	3	4	5	6	7	8	9	10	Final
Sapporo International University (Sato)	0	0	0	1	3	0	1	0	2	0	7
Consadole (Abe) 🔨	0	0	2	0	0	3	0	1	0	2	8

Sheet B	1	2	3	4	5	6	7	8	9	10	Final
Team Ogiwara (Ogiwara)	0	0	1	1	0	1	1	0	2	0	6
TM Karuizawa (Morozumi) 🔨	1	2	0	0	1	0	0	1	0	2	7

Sheet D	1	2	3	4	5	6	7	8	9	10	Final
Miyagi CA (Noguchi)	0	0	1	0	0	1	0	X	X	X	2
SC Karuizawa Club (Yanagisawa) 🔨	4	2	0	1	1	0	2	X	X	X	10

Sheet E	1	2	3	4	5	6	7	8	9	10	Final
Kitami Association (Hirata)	0	2	0	3	0	3	5	X	X	X	10
Okayama CA (Yoshioka) 🔨	1	0	1	0	1	0	0	X	X	X	3

==== Draw 5 ====
Monday, January 30, 13:30

Sheet A	1	2	3	4	5	6	7	8	9	10	Final
SC Karuizawa Club (Yanagisawa) 🔨	0	3	0	3	0	2	0	1	X	X	9
Team Ogiwara (Ogiwara)	0	0	2	0	1	0	1	0	X	X	4

Sheet B	1	2	3	4	5	6	7	8	9	10	Final
TM Karuizawa (Morozumi)	0	0	3	0	1	0	X	X	X	X	4
Consadole (Abe) 🔨	2	5	0	3	0	3	X	X	X	X	13

Sheet D	1	2	3	4	5	6	7	8	9	10	Final
Sapporo International University (Sato) 🔨	3	0	2	0	5	0	2	X	X	X	12
Miyagi CA (Noguchi)	0	1	0	2	0	1	0	X	X	X	4

Sheet E	1	2	3	4	5	6	7	8	9	10	Final
Team Ichimura (Ichimura) 🔨	2	0	0	0	0	0	1	0	1	X	4
Kitami Association (Hirata)	0	1	2	1	1	1	0	1	0	X	7

==== Draw 7 ====
Tuesday, January 31, 9:00

Sheet A	1	2	3	4	5	6	7	8	9	10	Final
Consadole (Abe) 🔨	0	4	1	0	0	1	0	2	X	X	8
Team Ichimura (Ichimura)	0	0	0	1	0	0	1	0	X	X	2

Sheet B	1	2	3	4	5	6	7	8	9	10	Final
Okayama CA (Yoshioka)	0	1	0	0	1	0	0	X	X	X	2
SC Karuizawa Club (Yanagisawa) 🔨	2	0	3	2	0	2	2	X	X	X	11

Sheet D	1	2	3	4	5	6	7	8	9	10	Final
Kitami Association (Hirata)	0	0	0	1	1	0	2	0	0	X	4
TM Karuizawa (Morozumi) 🔨	1	1	2	0	0	3	0	1	1	X	9

Sheet E	1	2	3	4	5	6	7	8	9	10	Final
Team Ogiwara (Ogiwara) 🔨	0	0	0	1	0	1	0	1	0	X	3
Sapporo International University (Sato)	0	0	0	0	2	0	1	0	4	X	7

==== Draw 9 ====
Tuesday, January 31, 18:00

Sheet A	1	2	3	4	5	6	7	8	9	10	Final
Miyagi CA (Noguchi) 🔨	2	0	1	0	2	0	1	0	0	X	6
TM Karuizawa (Morozumi)	0	3	0	3	0	1	0	1	1	X	9

Sheet B	1	2	3	4	5	6	7	8	9	10	Final
Sapporo International University (Sato) 🔨	0	2	0	2	0	0	3	0	1	X	8
Team Ichimura (Ichimura)	0	0	1	0	1	1	0	2	0	X	5

Sheet D	1	2	3	4	5	6	7	8	9	10	Final
Team Ogiwara (Ogiwara) 🔨	0	2	0	1	0	1	0	1	0	2	7
Okayama CA (Yoshioka)	0	0	1	0	1	0	1	0	1	0	4

Sheet E	1	2	3	4	5	6	7	8	9	10	Final
SC Karuizawa Club (Yanagisawa)	0	0	0	2	0	1	0	2	3	1	9
Consadole (Abe) 🔨	0	0	4	0	1	0	1	0	0	0	6

==== Draw 11 ====
Wednesday, February 1, 13:30

Sheet A	1	2	3	4	5	6	7	8	9	10	Final
Team Ogiwara (Ogiwara)	0	1	0	2	0	1	0	0	0	X	4
Kitami Association (Hirata) 🔨	1	0	3	0	1	0	0	2	1	X	8

Sheet B	1	2	3	4	5	6	7	8	9	10	Final
Team Ichimura (Ichimura) 🔨	1	0	0	1	0	1	0	2	0	X	5
Miyagi CA (Noguchi)	0	0	2	0	3	0	3	0	1	X	9

Sheet D	1	2	3	4	5	6	7	8	9	10	Final
Okayama CA (Yoshioka)	0	0	0	1	0	0	1	X	X	X	2
Consadole (Abe) 🔨	0	3	1	0	3	1	0	X	X	X	8

Sheet E	1	2	3	4	5	6	7	8	9	10	Final
TM Karuizawa (Morozumi) 🔨	1	0	1	0	2	0	1	0	1	1	7
SC Karuizawa Club (Yanagisawa)	0	1	0	4	0	1	0	2	0	0	8

==== Draw 13 ====
Thursday, February 2, 9:00

Sheet A	1	2	3	4	5	6	7	8	9	10	Final
TM Karuizawa (Morozumi) 🔨	2	0	0	2	2	3	1	X	X	X	10
Okayama CA (Yoshioka)	0	1	1	0	0	0	0	X	X	X	2

Sheet B	1	2	3	4	5	6	7	8	9	10	Final
Kitami Association (Hirata)	0	0	2	1	0	1	0	0	3	X	7
Sapporo International University (Sato) 🔨	0	1	0	0	1	0	2	0	0	X	4

Sheet D	1	2	3	4	5	6	7	8	9	10	Final
Team Ichimura (Ichimura)	0	1	0	0	1	0	1	1	0	X	4
Team Ogiwara (Ogiwara) 🔨	1	0	2	1	0	1	0	0	3	X	8

Sheet E	1	2	3	4	5	6	7	8	9	10	Final
Consadole (Abe)	2	0	0	3	0	2	0	3	0	X	10
Miyagi CA (Noguchi) 🔨	0	1	1	0	2	0	1	0	1	X	6

==== Draw 15 ====
Thursday, February 2, 18:00

Sheet A	1	2	3	4	5	6	7	8	9	10	Final
Team Ichimura (Ichimura)	0	0	2	2	0	0	0	0	X	X	4
SC Karuizawa Club (Yanagisawa) 🔨	0	3	0	0	2	1	1	1	X	X	8

Sheet B	1	2	3	4	5	6	7	8	9	10	Final
Miyagi CA (Noguchi) 🔨	2	0	2	2	0	1	0	2	0	X	9
Okayama CA (Yoshioka)	0	2	0	0	1	0	1	0	1	X	5

Sheet D	1	2	3	4	5	6	7	8	9	10	Final
Consadole (Abe)	0	2	0	0	0	1	0	0	1	1	5
Kitami Association (Hirata) 🔨	1	0	0	2	0	0	2	1	0	0	6

Sheet E	1	2	3	4	5	6	7	8	9	10	Final
Sapporo International University (Sato)	1	0	0	0	0	1	0	0	0	X	2
TM Karuizawa (Morozumi) 🔨	0	1	0	0	1	0	1	2	1	X	6

==== Draw 17 ====
Friday, February 3, 13:30

Sheet A	1	2	3	4	5	6	7	8	9	10	Final
Okayama CA (Yoshioka)	0	1	0	0	0	0	X	X	X	X	1
Sapporo International University (Sato) 🔨	2	0	4	1	3	4	X	X	X	X	14

Sheet B	1	2	3	4	5	6	7	8	9	10	Final
SC Karuizawa Club (Yanagisawa)	0	0	0	2	0	1	1	1	0	0	5
Kitami Association (Hirata) 🔨	0	2	0	0	2	0	0	0	2	1	7

Sheet D	1	2	3	4	5	6	7	8	9	10	Final
TM Karuizawa (Morozumi) 🔨	2	0	3	2	1	0	X	X	X	X	8
Team Ichimura (Ichimura)	0	1	0	0	0	1	X	X	X	X	2

Sheet E	1	2	3	4	5	6	7	8	9	10	Final
Miyagi CA (Noguchi)	1	0	3	0	2	0	1	0	4	X	11
Team Ogiwara (Ogiwara) 🔨	0	1	0	1	0	2	0	1	0	X	5

=== Playoffs ===
Page playoff system
1	Kitami Association	9
2	SC Karuizawa Club	11
3	Consadole	8
4	TM Karuizawa	6

Semifinal
1	Kitami Association	7
3	Consadole	1

Final
2	SC Karuizawa Club	6
1	Kitami Association	2

==== 1 vs. 2 ====
Saturday, February 4, 9:00

Sheet B	1	2	3	4	5	6	7	8	9	10	11	Final
Kitami Association (Hirata) 🔨	1	0	3	0	0	3	0	2	0	0	0	9
SC Karuizawa Club (Yanagisawa)	0	2	0	2	0	0	2	0	2	1	2	11

==== 3 vs. 4 ====
Saturday, February 4, 9:00

Sheet E	1	2	3	4	5	6	7	8	9	10	Final
Consadole (Abe) 🔨	2	0	1	1	0	1	0	1	0	2	8
TM Karuizawa (Morozumi)	0	1	0	0	2	0	1	0	2	0	6

==== Semifinal ====
Saturday, February 4, 15:00

Sheet D	1	2	3	4	5	6	7	8	9	10	Final
Kitami Association (Hirata) 🔨	1	1	0	0	2	1	1	1	X	X	7
Consadole (Abe)	0	0	0	1	0	0	0	0	X	X	1

==== Final ====
Sunday, February 5, 9:00

Sheet B	1	2	3	4	5	6	7	8	9	10	Final
SC Karuizawa Club (Yanagisawa) 🔨	0	1	0	2	0	0	0	1	2	X	6
Kitami Association (Hirata)	0	0	1	0	0	0	1	0	0	X	2

2023 Japan Curling Championships
(Japan)
Riku Yanagisawa
2nd Japanese Championship title

=== Final standings ===
Place	Team	Skip
1st place, gold medalist(s)	SC Karuizawa Club	Riku Yanagisawa
2nd place, silver medalist(s)	Kitami Association	Kohsuke Hirata
3rd place, bronze medalist(s)	Consadole	Shinya Abe
4	TM Karuizawa	Yusuke Morozumi
5	Sapporo International University	Hayato Sato
6	Miyagi CA	Kotaro Noguchi
7	Team Ogiwara	Ryo Ogiwara
8	Okayama CA	Hiroki Yoshioka
9	Team Ichimura	Takanori Ichimura

== Women ==
=== Qualification ===
The following teams qualified to participate in the 2023 Japan Curling Championship:

Qualification method	Berths	Qualifying team(s)
2022 Champion	1	Loco Solare
2022 Runner-Up	1	Chubu Electric Power
Hokkaido Region	1	Hokkaido Bank
Tōhoku Region	1	Philoseek Aomori
Kanto Region	1	Tokyo Metropolitan Institute
Central Region	1	SC Karuizawa Club
West Japan Region	1	Team Hiroshima
Wild Card 1	1	LS Kitami
Wild Card 2	1	Aomori CA

=== Teams ===
The teams are listed as follows:

Team	Skip	Third	Second	Lead	Alternate	Locale
Aomori CA	Rin Suzuki	Natsuki Saito	Juuna Nagaya	Shinyu Matsuyama	Aizawa Sora	Aomori
Chubu Electric Power	Ikue Kitazawa	Seina Nakajima	Minori Suzuki	Hasumi Ishigooka	Chiaki Matsumura	Nagano
Hokkaido Bank	Momoha Tabata	Miku Nihira	Mikoto Nakajima	Ayami Ito	Sae Yamamoto	Sapporo
Loco Solare	Satsuki Fujisawa	Chinami Yoshida	Yumi Suzuki	Yurika Yoshida	Kotomi Ishizaki	Kitami
LS Kitami	Honoka Sasaki	Mari Motohashi	Miki Hayashi	Mayumi Saito	Yako Matsuzawa	Kitami
Philoseek Aomori	Misaki Tanaka (Fourth)	Miori Nakamura (Skip)	Haruka Kihara	Hiyori Ichinohe	Yuuna Harada	Aomori
SC Karuizawa Club	Asuka Kanai	Ami Enami	Junko Nishimuro	Mone Ryokawa	Miyu Ueno	Nagano
Team Hiroshima	Riho Zaikan	Akari Iwatani	Haruna Yamauchi	Ai Kawada	Sachiko Zaikan	Hiroshima
Tokyo Metropolitan Institute	Yumi Suzuki	Kyoka Kuramitsu	Aki Goto	Miho Fujimori	Tori Koana	Tokyo

=== Round robin standings ===
Final Round Robin Standings

Key
Teams to Playoffs

Team	Skip	W	L	W–L	PF	PA	EW	EL	BE	SE	DSC
Loco Solare	Satsuki Fujisawa	6	2	1–1	76	39	38	24	6	14	31.01
Chubu Electric Power	Ikue Kitazawa	6	2	1–1	76	42	40	28	0	19	38.91
Philoseek Aomori	Miori Nakamura	6	2	1–1	66	32	36	22	2	20	64.87
SC Karuizawa Club	Asuka Kanai	5	3	1–0	56	55	36	31	2	11	34.81
Hokkaido Bank	Momoha Tabata	5	3	0–1	68	46	36	29	5	11	53.75
LS Kitami	Honoka Sasaki	3	5	1–0	50	62	34	37	2	8	34.93
Tokyo Metropolitan Institute	Yumi Suzuki	3	5	0–1	43	57	27	35	3	5	54.26
Aomori CA	Rin Suzuki	2	6	–	35	60	23	37	7	3	65.15
Team Hiroshima	Riho Zaikan	0	8	–	16	93	15	42	1	2	96.64

=== Round robin results ===
All draws are listed in Japan Standard Time (UTC+09:00).

==== Draw 2 ====
Sunday, January 29, 13:30

Sheet A	1	2	3	4	5	6	7	8	9	10	11	Final
Chubu Electric Power (Kitazawa)	0	0	2	0	2	0	2	0	0	2	0	8
Hokkaido Bank (Tabata) 🔨	0	2	0	3	0	1	0	0	2	0	3	11

Sheet B	1	2	3	4	5	6	7	8	9	10	Final
Team Hiroshima (Zaikan)	1	1	0	1	0	1	0	0	0	X	4
Aomori CA (R. Suzuki) 🔨	0	0	1	0	3	0	1	1	3	X	9

Sheet D	1	2	3	4	5	6	7	8	9	10	Final
SC Karuizawa Club (Kanai)	0	0	1	0	1	0	2	0	X	X	4
Loco Solare (Fujisawa) 🔨	4	2	0	2	0	5	0	2	X	X	15

Sheet E	1	2	3	4	5	6	7	8	9	10	Final
Philoseek Aomori (Nakamura)	0	0	0	3	1	0	4	0	2	X	10
Tokyo Metropolitan Institute (Y. Suzuki) 🔨	0	0	2	0	0	1	0	1	0	X	4

==== Draw 4 ====
Monday, January 30, 9:00

Sheet A	1	2	3	4	5	6	7	8	9	10	Final
Loco Solare (Fujisawa) 🔨	4	2	4	3	3	2	X	X	X	X	18
Team Hiroshima (Zaikan)	0	0	0	0	0	0	X	X	X	X	0

Sheet B	1	2	3	4	5	6	7	8	9	10	Final
Aomori CA (R. Suzuki) 🔨	1	0	1	0	0	2	0	0	0	2	6
LS Kitami (Sasaki)	0	1	0	0	2	0	1	1	0	0	5

Sheet D	1	2	3	4	5	6	7	8	9	10	Final
Hokkaido Bank (Tabata) 🔨	1	0	2	0	0	0	0	2	1	0	6
SC Karuizawa Club (Kanai)	0	2	0	1	0	2	1	0	0	1	7

Sheet E	1	2	3	4	5	6	7	8	9	10	Final
Chubu Electric Power (Kitazawa) 🔨	0	1	2	2	0	0	3	1	X	X	9
Philoseek Aomori (Nakamura)	1	0	0	0	1	1	0	0	X	X	3

==== Draw 6 ====
Monday, January 30, 18:00

Sheet A	1	2	3	4	5	6	7	8	9	10	Final
SC Karuizawa Club (Kanai)	0	0	1	0	0	2	1	1	0	X	5
Aomori CA (R. Suzuki) 🔨	0	0	0	1	1	0	0	0	1	X	3

Sheet B	1	2	3	4	5	6	7	8	9	10	Final
LS Kitami (Sasaki) 🔨	1	0	3	0	1	0	2	0	1	X	8
Team Hiroshima (Zaikan)	0	1	0	1	0	1	0	1	0	X	4

Sheet D	1	2	3	4	5	6	7	8	9	10	Final
Loco Solare (Fujisawa) 🔨	0	1	2	0	0	1	0	0	2	0	6
Hokkaido Bank (Tabata)	0	0	0	3	0	0	2	1	0	2	8

Sheet E	1	2	3	4	5	6	7	8	9	10	Final
Tokyo Metropolitan Institute (Y. Suzuki) 🔨	1	1	0	0	0	0	0	0	X	X	2
Chubu Electric Power (Kitazawa)	0	0	1	1	2	1	3	4	X	X	12

==== Draw 8 ====
Tuesday, January 31, 13:30

Sheet A	1	2	3	4	5	6	7	8	9	10	Final
Team Hiroshima (Zaikan) 🔨	1	0	1	0	0	0	0	X	X	X	2
Tokyo Metropolitan Institute (Y. Suzuki)	0	3	0	2	1	1	3	X	X	X	10

Sheet B	1	2	3	4	5	6	7	8	9	10	Final
Philoseek Aomori (Nakamura) 🔨	0	0	0	1	1	0	2	0	1	0	5
SC Karuizawa Club (Kanai)	1	0	1	0	0	1	0	2	0	2	7

Sheet D	1	2	3	4	5	6	7	8	9	10	Final
Chubu Electric Power (Kitazawa) 🔨	1	0	0	0	0	2	1	0	2	2	8
LS Kitami (Sasaki)	0	1	1	1	1	0	0	1	0	0	5

Sheet E	1	2	3	4	5	6	7	8	9	10	Final
Aomori CA (R. Suzuki)	0	2	0	0	0	0	0	0	X	X	2
Loco Solare (Fujisawa) 🔨	1	0	2	0	2	1	2	2	X	X	10

==== Draw 10 ====
Wednesday, February 1, 9:00

Sheet A	1	2	3	4	5	6	7	8	9	10	Final
Hokkaido Bank (Tabata)	0	3	0	1	1	1	0	3	4	X	13
LS Kitami (Sasaki) 🔨	1	0	1	0	0	0	2	0	0	X	4

Sheet B	1	2	3	4	5	6	7	8	9	10	Final
Loco Solare (Fujisawa) 🔨	1	1	0	0	2	0	1	0	2	X	7
Tokyo Metropolitan Institute (Y. Suzuki)	0	0	1	0	0	2	0	1	0	X	4

Sheet D	1	2	3	4	5	6	7	8	9	10	Final
Aomori CA (R. Suzuki)	0	0	1	0	0	0	1	0	3	X	5
Philoseek Aomori (Nakamura) 🔨	0	2	0	2	0	2	0	3	0	X	9

Sheet E	1	2	3	4	5	6	7	8	9	10	Final
SC Karuizawa Club (Kanai) 🔨	1	1	0	2	2	0	0	5	X	X	11
Team Hiroshima (Zaikan)	0	0	1	0	0	2	0	0	X	X	3

==== Draw 12 ====
Wednesday, February 1, 18:00

Sheet A	1	2	3	4	5	6	7	8	9	10	Final
Aomori CA (R. Suzuki)	0	3	0	0	0	0	1	0	X	X	4
Chubu Electric Power (Kitazawa) 🔨	1	0	2	1	2	1	0	3	X	X	10

Sheet B	1	2	3	4	5	6	7	8	9	10	Final
Tokyo Metropolitan Institute (Y. Suzuki) 🔨	2	0	1	0	0	2	0	4	0	X	9
Hokkaido Bank (Tabata)	0	1	0	1	2	0	1	0	1	X	6

Sheet D	1	2	3	4	5	6	7	8	9	10	Final
Philoseek Aomori (Nakamura)	3	1	3	2	0	4	X	X	X	X	13
Team Hiroshima (Zaikan) 🔨	0	0	0	0	1	0	X	X	X	X	1

Sheet E	1	2	3	4	5	6	7	8	9	10	Final
LS Kitami (Sasaki)	0	1	0	2	0	2	2	1	0	1	9
SC Karuizawa Club (Kanai) 🔨	2	0	2	0	2	0	0	0	1	0	7

==== Draw 14 ====
Thursday, February 2, 13:30

Sheet A	1	2	3	4	5	6	7	8	9	10	Final
LS Kitami (Sasaki)	0	0	1	0	0	0	0	X	X	X	1
Philoseek Aomori (Nakamura) 🔨	2	3	0	1	1	1	3	X	X	X	11

Sheet B	1	2	3	4	5	6	7	8	9	10	Final
Chubu Electric Power (Kitazawa)	0	2	0	0	1	0	2	0	1	0	6
Loco Solare (Fujisawa) 🔨	1	0	1	2	0	2	0	0	0	2	8

Sheet D	1	2	3	4	5	6	7	8	9	10	Final
Tokyo Metropolitan Institute (Y. Suzuki) 🔨	1	0	0	2	0	0	1	0	3	X	7
Aomori CA (R. Suzuki)	0	0	0	0	1	0	0	1	0	X	2

Sheet E	1	2	3	4	5	6	7	8	9	10	Final
Team Hiroshima (Zaikan)	0	0	0	0	0	0	1	X	X	X	1
Hokkaido Bank (Tabata) 🔨	2	2	0	1	1	6	0	X	X	X	12

==== Draw 16 ====
Friday, February 3, 9:00

Sheet A	1	2	3	4	5	6	7	8	9	10	Final
Tokyo Metropolitan Institute (Y. Suzuki)	0	0	1	0	1	0	0	1	0	X	3
SC Karuizawa Club (Kanai) 🔨	0	2	0	1	0	1	1	0	2	X	7

Sheet B	1	2	3	4	5	6	7	8	9	10	Final
Hokkaido Bank (Tabata) 🔨	0	0	0	1	0	0	0	1	X	X	2
Philoseek Aomori (Nakamura)	0	3	1	0	1	1	1	0	X	X	7

Sheet D	1	2	3	4	5	6	7	8	9	10	Final
Team Hiroshima (Zaikan)	0	0	0	1	0	0	0	X	X	X	1
Chubu Electric Power (Kitazawa) 🔨	4	4	1	0	1	1	1	X	X	X	12

Sheet E	1	2	3	4	5	6	7	8	9	10	Final
Loco Solare (Fujisawa)	0	1	0	2	0	2	0	2	0	2	9
LS Kitami (Sasaki) 🔨	1	0	2	0	2	0	2	0	0	0	7

==== Draw 18 ====
Friday, February 3, 18:00

Sheet A	1	2	3	4	5	6	7	8	9	10	Final
Philoseek Aomori (Nakamura)	0	0	2	0	2	1	0	2	1	X	8
Loco Solare (Fujisawa) 🔨	0	0	0	1	0	0	2	0	0	X	3

Sheet B	1	2	3	4	5	6	7	8	9	10	Final
SC Karuizawa Club (Kanai) 🔨	1	0	0	2	2	0	2	0	1	X	8
Chubu Electric Power (Kitazawa)	0	1	2	0	0	5	0	3	0	X	11

Sheet D	1	2	3	4	5	6	7	8	9	10	Final
LS Kitami (Sasaki) 🔨	3	0	1	0	1	1	2	0	3	X	11
Tokyo Metropolitan Institute (Y. Suzuki)	0	1	0	1	0	0	0	2	0	X	4

Sheet E	1	2	3	4	5	6	7	8	9	10	Final
Hokkaido Bank (Tabata) 🔨	3	0	2	1	0	0	2	0	2	X	10
Aomori CA (R. Suzuki)	0	1	0	0	2	0	0	1	0	X	4

=== Playoffs ===
Page playoff system
1	Loco Solare	7
2	Chubu Electric Power	4
3	Philoseek Aomori	9
4	SC Karuizawa Club	11

Semifinal
2	Chubu Electric Power	6
4	SC Karuizawa Club	7

Final
1	Loco Solare	7
4	SC Karuizawa Club	5

==== 1 vs. 2 ====
Saturday, February 4, 9:00

Sheet D	1	2	3	4	5	6	7	8	9	10	Final
Loco Solare (Fujisawa) 🔨	0	1	0	1	0	1	1	1	1	1	7
Chubu Electric Power (Kitazawa)	1	0	2	0	1	0	0	0	0	0	4

==== 3 vs. 4 ====
Saturday, February 4, 9:00

Sheet A	1	2	3	4	5	6	7	8	9	10	Final
Philoseek Aomori (Nakamura) 🔨	2	0	2	0	3	1	0	0	0	1	9
SC Karuizawa Club (Kanai)	0	0	0	1	0	0	3	5	2	0	11

==== Semifinal ====
Saturday, February 4, 15:00

Sheet B	1	2	3	4	5	6	7	8	9	10	Final
Chubu Electric Power (Kitazawa) 🔨	1	0	0	2	0	2	0	0	1	0	6
SC Karuizawa Club (Kanai)	0	2	1	0	2	0	1	0	0	1	7

==== Final ====
Sunday, February 5, 15:00

Sheet D	1	2	3	4	5	6	7	8	9	10	Final
Loco Solare (Fujisawa) 🔨	1	2	1	0	2	0	1	0	0	X	7
SC Karuizawa Club (Kanai)	0	0	0	2	0	2	0	0	1	X	5

2023 Japan Curling Championships
(Japan)
Satsuki Fujisawa
8th Japanese Championship title

=== Final standings ===
Place	Team	Skip
1st place, gold medalist(s)	Loco Solare	Satsuki Fujisawa
2nd place, silver medalist(s)	SC Karuizawa Club	Asuka Kanai
3rd place, bronze medalist(s)	Chubu Electric Power	Ikue Kitazawa
4	Philoseek Aomori	Miori Nakamura
5	Hokkaido Bank	Momoha Tabata
6	LS Kitami	Honoka Sasaki
7	Tokyo Metropolitan Institute	Yumi Suzuki
8	Aomori CA	Rin Suzuki
9	Team Hiroshima	Riho Zaikan
