= Shingo Usui =

Japanese curler (born 2002)

- Curler
- Born: October 11, 1994 (age 32); Kitami, Japan

Team
- Skip: Kohsuke Hirata
- Third: Shingo Usui
- Second: Ryota Meguro
- Lead: Yoshiya Miura
- Alternate: Kosuke Aita

Curling career
- Member Association: Japan
- World Championship: 3 (2023, 2025, 2026)
- Pan Continental Championship: 2 (2023, 2025)
- Other appearances: Winter Youth Olympics: 1 (2012); Winter Universiade: 1 (2015)
Medal record
Men's curling
Representing Japan
Pan Continental Championships
Bronze medal – third place	2023 Kelowna
Bronze medal – third place	2025 Virginia
Representing Hokkaido
Japan Curling Championships
Silver medal – second place	2023 Tokoro
Japan Mixed Doubles Curling Championship
Bronze medal – third place	2025 Wakkanai

Shingo Usui (臼井 槙吾, Usui Shingo; born October 11, 1994) is a Japanese curler from Kitami, Japan.

== Teams and events ==
=== Men's ===
Season	Skip	Third	Second	Lead	Alternate	Coach	Events
2013–14	Yasumasa Tanida	Yuya Takigahira	Shingo Usui	Kazuki Yoshikawa	Ryuji Shibaya	Kenji Ogawa	PAJCC 2014 (4th)
2014–15	Yasumasa Tanida	Yuya Takigahira	Shingo Usui	Kazuki Yoshikawa	Kohsuke Hirata	Kenji Ogawa	WUG 2015 (7th)
2015–16	Yasumasa Tanida	Yuya Takigahira	Shingo Usui	Kazuki Yoshikawa	Tatsuki Sasaki		
2016–17	Yuya Takigahira	Shingo Usui	Tatsuki Sasaki	Kazuki Yoshikawa			
2016–17	Shingo Usui	Yuya Takigahira	Tatsuki Sasaki	Kazuki Yoshikawa	Ryota Meguro		JCC 2017 (5th)
2021–22	Kohsuke Hirata	Shingo Usui	Ryota Meguro	Yoshiya Miura	Shunta Kobayashi	Hirofumi Kobayashi	JCC 2022 (4th)
2022–23	Kohsuke Hirata	Shingo Usui	Ryota Meguro	Kosuke Aita	Yoshiya Miura	Hirofumi Kobayashi, Tomoyuki Ninomaru	JCC 2023 (silver)
2022–23	Riku Yanagisawa	Tsuyoshi Yamaguchi	Takeru Yamamoto	Satoshi Koizumi	Shingo Usui	Bob Ursel	WCC 2023 (7th)
2023–24	Riku Yanagisawa	Tsuyoshi Yamaguchi	Takeru Yamamoto	Satoshi Koizumi	Shingo Usui	Bob Ursel	PCCC 2023 (bronze)
2023–24	Kohsuke Hirata	Shingo Usui	Ryota Meguro	Yoshiya Miura	Kosuke Aita	Hirofumi Kobayashi	JCC 2024 (5th)
2024–25	Kohsuke Hirata	Shingo Usui	Ryota Meguro	Yoshiya Miura	Hirofumi Kobayashi	Hirofumi Kobayashi	JCC 2025 (4th)
2024–25	Riku Yanagisawa (fourth)	Tsuyoshi Yamaguchi (skip)	Takeru Yamamoto	Satoshi Koizumi	Shingo Usui	Bob Ursel	WCC 2025 (9th)

=== Mixed ===
Season	Skip	Third	Second	Lead	Coach	Events
2011–12	Shingo Usui	Mizuki Kitaguchi	Martin Reichel	Irena Brettbacher	Katja Schweizer	WYOG 2012 (14th)

=== Mixed doubles ===
Season	Male	Female	Coach	Events
2011–12	(China) Cao Ying	(Japan) Shingo Usui	Shinya Abe	WYOG 2012 (17th)
2023–24	Mikoto Nakajima	Shingo Usui	Hirofumi Kobayashi	JMDCC 2024 (4th)
2024–25	Ikue Kitazawa	Shingo Usui		JMDCC 2025 (bronze)

== Personal life ==
As of 2025, he is a company employee. He started curling in 2000 at the age of 6.
