= Mone Ryokawa =

Japanese curler (born 2000)

- Curler ♀
- Born: 2000 (age 25–26); Karuizawa, Japan

Team
- Curling club: Karuizawa CC, Karuizawa
- Skip: Miyu Ueno
- Third: Asuka Kanai
- Second: Junko Nishimuro
- Lead: Yui Ueno
- Alternate: Mone Ryokawa

Curling career
- Member Association: Japan
- World Championship: 1 (2024)
- World Mixed Championship: 1 (2018)
- World Junior Curling Championship: 1 (2019)
Medal record
Curling
Representing Nagano
Japan Curling Championships
Gold medal – first place	2024 Sapporo
Silver medal – second place	2023 Tokoro

Mone Ryokawa (両川萌音, Ryōkawa Moene; born 2000) is a Japanese curler from Karuizawa.

At the national level she is a Japan women's champion curler.

She began curling in 2007 at the age of 7.

== Teams and events ==
=== Women's ===
Season	Skip	Third	Second	Lead	Alternate	Coach	Events
2017–18	Ami Enami (fourth)	Minori Suzuki	Sae Yamamoto (skip)	Mone Ryokawa			
2017–18	Ami Enami (fourth)	Minori Suzuki	Sae Yamamoto	Mone Ryokawa (skip)			
2018–19	Ami Enami	Minori Suzuki	Sae Yamamoto	Mone Ryokawa	Asuka Kanai	Tsuyoshi Yamaguchi	WJCC 2019 (9th)
2019–20	Asuka Kanai	Ami Enami	Junko Nishimuro	Mone Ryokawa			
2020–21	Ami Enami	Asuka Kanai	Junko Nishimuro	Mone Ryokawa			JCC 2021 (5th)
2021–22	Asuka Kanai	Ami Enami	Junko Nishimuro	Mone Ryokawa		Yuji Nishimuro	JCC 2022 (6th)
2022–23	Asuka Kanai	Ami Enami	Junko Nishimuro	Mone Ryokawa	Miyu Ueno	Yuji Nishimuro	JCC 2023 (silver)
2023–24	Miyu Ueno	Asuka Kanai	Junko Nishimuro	Yui Ueno	Mone Ryokawa	Yuji Nishimuro	JCC 2024 (gold); WCC 2024 (11th)

=== Mixed ===
Season	Skip	Third	Second	Lead	Coach	Events
2018–19	Taisei Kanai	Asuka Kanai	Takeru Ichimura	Mone Ryokawa	Tatsuhiro Matsunouchi	WMxCC 2018 (17th)
