= Junko Nishimuro =

Japanese curler

- Curler
- Born: Junko Sonobe; December 21, 1980 (age 45); Karuizawa, Nagano

Curling career
- Member Association: Japan
- World Championship: 2 (2006, 2024)
- Pacific-Asia Championship: 1 (2005)
- Pan Continental Championship: 1 (2024)
Medal record
Women's curling
Representing Japan
Asian Winter Games
Silver medal – second place	2007 Changchun
Pacific-Asia Championships
Gold medal – first place	2005 Taipei
Representing Nagano
Japan Curling Championships
Gold medal – first place	2005 Tokoro
Gold medal – first place	2024 Sapporo
Silver medal – second place	2003 Karuizawa
Silver medal – second place	2006 Aomori
Silver medal – second place	2007 Moseushi
Silver medal – second place	2008 Karuizawa
Silver medal – second place	2023 Tokoro
Bronze medal – third place	1998 Tokoro
Representing Yamanashi
Japan Curling Championships
Gold medal – first place	2018 Nayoro
Silver medal – second place	2016 Aomori
Bronze medal – third place	2015 Tokoro
Bronze medal – third place	2017 Karuizawa

Junko Nishimuro (西室淳子, Nishimuro Junko; born December 21, 1980 as Junko Sonobe) is a Japanese curler from Otsuki, Yamanashi. She is the second on the SC Karuizawa Club curling team, which is skipped by Miyu Ueno. At the international level, she represented Japan at the 2005 Pacific Curling Championships and the 2006 World Women's Curling Championship as a result of winning the 2005 Japan Curling Championships.

== Career ==
Nishimuro won her first Japan Curling Championships title in 2005 with teammates Yukako Tsuchiya, Tomoko Sonobe, Chiemi Kameyama and Mitsuki Sato. She had previously won silver in 2003 and bronze in 1998. This qualified the team to represent Japan at the 2005 Pacific Curling Championships in Taipei, Chinese Taipei. Through the round robin, the team placed second with a 4–1 record. They then beat New Zealand in the semifinal and China's Wang Bingyu in the final to win the gold medal. With the win, they qualified for the 2006 World Women's Curling Championship in Grande Prairie, Alberta. At the Worlds, the team struggled, finishing eleventh out of twelve teams with a 3–8 record.

In 2007, the Tsuchiya rink represented Japan at the 2007 Asian Winter Games. After the double round robin, they finished first with a 5–1 record. This earned them a bye to the championship final where they were defeated by South Korea, earning the silver medal.

Nishimuro would not win another national title until 2018, where as the alternate for the Tori Koana team, they defeated the Ayumi Ogasawara rink in the championship final. Nishimuro previously threw fourth stones on the Fujikyu team from 2015 to 2017, earning two bronze medals and one silver at the Japanese championship. Despite winning the Japanese championship, Nishimuro did not participate in the 2018 World Women's Curling Championship with the team and was instead replaced by Kaho Onodera of Team Ogasawara.

During the 2018–19 season, Team Koana were named as the Japanese representatives at the third leg of the 2018–19 Curling World Cup. At the event, they finished with a 2–4 record.

== Personal life ==
Nishimuro was previously employed at Fujikyu during her time with Team Koana. She was previously a speed skater before switching to curling in junior high school. She is currently self employed at a curling supplies store.

== Teams ==
Season	Skip	Third	Second	Lead	Alternate
1997–98	Yukako Tsuchiya	Yuka Kobayashi	Mika Yoda	Tomoko Sonobe	Junko Sonobe
2002–03	Yukako Tsuchiya	Junko Sonobe	Tomoko Sonobe	Chiemi Kameyama	Mitsuki Sato
2004–05	Yukako Tsuchiya	Junko Sonobe	Tomoko Sonobe	Chiemi Kameyama	Mitsuki Sato
2005–06	Yukako Tsuchiya	Junko Sonobe	Tomoko Sonobe	Chiemi Kameyama	Mitsuki Sato
2006–07	Yukako Tsuchiya	Junko Sonobe	Tomoko Sonobe	Mitsuki Sato	Miyuki Sato
2007–08	Yukako Tsuchiya	Junko Sonobe	Tomoko Sonobe	Mitsuki Sato	Miyuki Sato
2012–13	Tori Koana	Junko Nishimuro	Midori Hachimaru	Riko Toyoda	Yuji Nishimuro
2013–14	Junko Nishimuro (Fourth)	Tori Koana (Skip)	Midori Hachimaru	Riko Toyoda	
2014–15	Junko Nishimuro (Fourth)	Tori Koana (Skip)	Misato Yanagisawa	Riko Toyoda	
2015–16	Junko Nishimuro (Fourth)	Misato Yanagisawa	Tori Koana (Skip)	Riko Toyoda	Yuna Kotani
2016–17	Junko Nishimuro (Fourth)	Tori Koana (Skip)	Yuna Kotani	Mao Ishigaki	Kyoka Kuramitsu
2017–18	Junko Nishimuro (Fourth)	Tori Koana (Skip)	Yuna Kotani	Mao Ishigaki	Arisa Kotani
2018–19	Tori Koana	Junko Nishimuro	Mao Ishigaki	Arisa Kotani	Yuna Kotani
2019–20	Asuka Kanai	Ami Enami	Junko Nishimuro	Mone Ryokawa	
2020–21	Ami Enami	Asuka Kanai	Junko Nishimuro	Mone Ryokawa	
2021–22	Asuka Kanai	Ami Enami	Junko Nishimuro	Mone Ryokawa	
2022–23	Asuka Kanai	Ami Enami	Junko Nishimuro	Mone Ryokawa	
2023–24	Miyu Ueno	Asuka Kanai	Junko Nishimuro	Yui Ueno	Mone Ryokawa
2024–25	Miyu Ueno	Yui Ueno	Junko Nishimuro	Asuka Kanai	
2025–26	Miyu Ueno	Yui Ueno	Junko Nishimuro	Asuka Kanai	
