= Asuka Kanai =

Japanese curler

- Curler ♀
- Born: April 14, 2001 (age 25); Karuizawa, Japan

Team
- Curling club: Karuizawa CC, Karuizawa
- Skip: Miyu Ueno
- Third: Asuka Kanai
- Second: Yui Ozeki
- Lead: Yui Ueno

Curling career
- Member Association: Japan
- World Championship: 1 (2024)
- Pan Continental Championship: 1 (2024)
- World Junior Curling Championship: 2 (2016, 2019)
Medal record
Curling
Representing Nagano
Japan Curling Championships
Gold medal – first place	2024 Sapporo
Gold medal – first place	2026 Yokohama
Silver medal – second place	2023 Tokoro

Asuka Kanai (金井 亜翠香, Kanai Asuka; born April 14, 2001) is a Japanese curler from Karuizawa. She currently plays third on the SC Karuizawa Club curling team skipped by Miyu Ueno.

== Early life ==
She began curling in 2008 at the age of 7

== Career ==
At the national level she is a Japan women's champion curler.

== Teams and events ==
=== Women's ===
Season	Skip	Third	Second	Lead	Alternate	Coach	Events
2014–15	Ayano Tsuchiya	Yumi Suzuki	Miyu Ueno	Asuka Kanai			
2015–16	Ayano Tsuchiya	Yumi Suzuki	Miyu Ueno	Asuka Kanai	Yui Ueno	Nagisa Matsumura	WJBCC 2016 (silver)
2015–16	Ayano Tsuchiya	Yumi Suzuki	Yui Ueno	Asuka Kanai	Sae Yamamoto	Nagisa Matsumura	WJCC 2016 (10th)
2017–18	Asuka Kanai	Miyu Ueno	Hinako Sonobe	Nagisa Matsumura			JCC 2018 (5th)
2018–19	Asuka Kanai	Miyu Ueno	Yui Ueno	Hinako Sonobe		Nagisa Matsumura	
2018–19	Ami Enami	Minori Suzuki	Sae Yamamoto	Mone Ryokawa	Asuka Kanai	Tsuyoshi Yamaguchi	WJCC 2019 (9th)
2019–20	Asuka Kanai	Ami Enami	Junko Nishimuro	Mone Ryokawa			
2020–21	Ami Enami	Asuka Kanai	Junko Nishimuro	Mone Ryokawa			JCC 2021 (5th)
2021–22	Asuka Kanai	Ami Enami	Junko Nishimuro	Mone Ryokawa		Yuji Nishimuro	JCC 2022 (6th)
2022–23	Asuka Kanai	Ami Enami	Junko Nishimuro	Mone Ryokawa	Miyu Ueno	Yuji Nishimuro	JCC 2023 (silver)
2023–24	Miyu Ueno	Asuka Kanai	Junko Nishimuro	Yui Ueno	Mone Ryokawa	Yuji Nishimuro	JCC 2024 (gold); WCC 2024 (11th)
2024–25	Miyu Ueno	Yui Ueno	Junko Nishimuro	Asuka Kanai	Kaho Onodera (PCCC)	Yuji Nishimuro	PCCC 2024 (4th); JCC 2025 (8th)
2025–26	Miyu Ueno	Yui Ueno	Junko Nishimuro	Asuka Kanai		Yuji Nishimuro	JOCT 2025 (silver)
2026	Miyu Ueno	Yui Ueno	Asuka Kanai	Ai Kawata	Mayo Yamaura	Yuji Nishimuro	JCC 2026 (gold)
2026–27	Miyu Ueno	Asuka Kanai	Yui Ozeki	Yui Ueno		Yuji Nishimuro	

=== Mixed ===
Season	Skip	Third	Second	Lead	Coach	Events
2018–19	Taisei Kanai	Asuka Kanai	Takeru Ichimura	Mone Ryokawa	Tatsuhiro Matsunouchi	WMxCC 2018 (17th)
