= Sota Tsuruga =

Japanese curler (born 2002)

- Curler
- Born: October 13, 2002 (age 24); Sapporo, Japan

Team
- Curling club: Hokkaido Consadole Sapporo, Sapporo, Japan
- Skip: Shinya Abe
- Fourth: Tetsuro Shimizu
- Second: Hayato Sato
- Lead: Haruto Ouchi
- Alternate: Sota Tsuruga

Curling career
- Member Association: Japan
- World Championship: 1 (2024)
- Pan Continental Championship: 1 (2024)
Medal record
Men's curling
Representing Japan
Pan Continental Championships
Silver medal – second place	2024 Lacombe
Representing Hokkaido
Japan Curling Championships
Gold medal – first place	2024 Sapporo
Bronze medal – third place	2023 Tokoro
Bronze medal – third place	2025 Yokohama

Sota Tsuruga (敦賀爽太, Tsuruga Sota; born October 13, 2002) is a Japanese curler from Sapporo, Japan.

== Teams and events ==
=== Men's ===
Season	Skip	Third	Second	Lead	Alternate	Coach	Events
2018–19	Sota Tsuruga	Haruto Ouchi	Takuto Ouchi	Naoki Kanazawa	Takahashi Ono		
2022–23	Tetsuro Shimizu (Fourth)	Haruto Ouchi	Shinya Abe (Skip)	Minori Suzuki	Sota Tsuruga		JMCC 2023 (bronze)
2023–24	Tetsuro Shimizu (Fourth)	Shinya Abe (Skip)	Haruto Ouchi	Sota Tsuruga	Makoto Tsuruga	Makoto Tsuruga	JMCC 2024 (gold)
2023–24	Tetsuro Shimizu (Fourth)	Shinya Abe (Skip)	Haruto Ouchi	Sota Tsuruga	Asei Nakahara	Bob Ursel	WCC 2024 (11th)
2024–25	Tetsuro Shimizu (Fourth)	Shinya Abe (Skip)	Hayato Sato	Haruto Ouchi	Sota Tsuruga	Bob Ursel	PCCC 2024 (silver)
2025–26	Tetsuro Shimizu (Fourth)	Shinya Abe (Skip)	Hayato Sato	Haruto Ouchi	Sota Tsuruga	Bob Ursel	

=== Mixed doubles ===
Season	Male	Female	Events
2019–20	Sota Tsuruga	Honoka Sasaki	
