= Takeru Yamamoto =

Japanese curler

- Curler
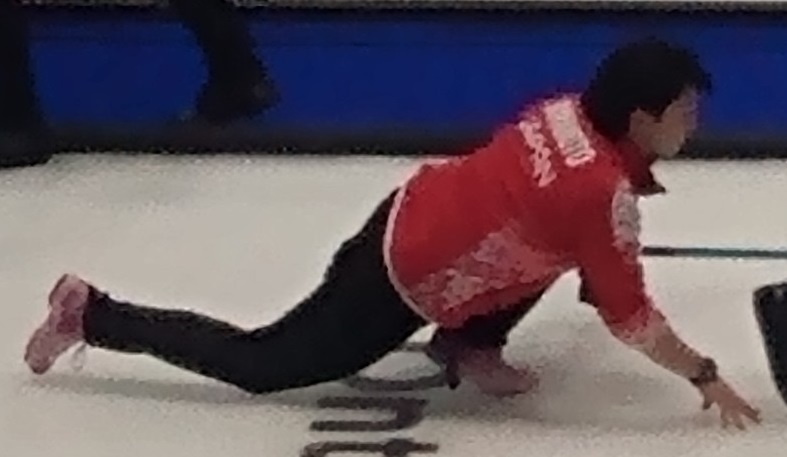
- Born: 9 August 2006 (age 20); Karuizawa, Nagano

Team
- Curling club: SC Karuizawa Club, Karuizawa, Nagano
- Skip: Tsuyoshi Yamaguchi
- Fourth: Riku Yanagisawa
- Second: Takeru Yamamoto
- Lead: Satoshi Koizumi
- Alternate: Yasumasa Tanida

Curling career
- Member Association: Japan
- World Championship: 3 (2023, 2025, 2026)
- Pan Continental Championship: 3 (2022, 2023, 2025)
- World Junior Mixed Doubles Curling Championship: 1 (2025)
Medal record
Men's curling
Representing Japan
Pan Continental Championships
Bronze medal – third place	2023 Kelowna
Bronze medal – third place	2025 Virginia
Representing Nagano
Japan Curling Championships
Gold medal – first place	2022 Tokoro
Gold medal – first place	2023 Tokoro
Gold medal – first place	2025 Yokohama
Gold medal – first place	2026 Yokohama
Silver medal – second place	2024 Sapporo

Takeru Yamamoto (山本 遵, Yamamoto Takeru; born 9 August 2006) is a Japanese curler. He is a two-time Japanese men's champion, playing second for the SC Karuizawa team, skipped by Tsuyoshi Yamaguchi.

== Career ==
Yamamoto joined the SC Karuizawa team in 2022, at just the age of 15. The team played in the 2022 Japan Curling Championships, going undefeated in the round robin. In the playoffs, they lost the 1 vs. 2 game to Hayato Sato's Sapporo International University team. They rebounded by defeating Yasumasa Tanida in the semifinal, before defeating Sato in the final, winning the gold medal.

With the win, the team represented Japan at the inaugural 2022 Pan Continental Curling Championships. There, the team went 3–4 in the round robin. This was still good enough to make it to the playoffs, but they lost the semifinal to Canada, and the bronze medal game to the United States. The team had a strong season on the tour, winning the Prestige Hotels & Resorts Curling Classic, Karuizawa International Curling Championships and the King Cash Spiel. The team would tour Canada for over three months from August to December, and were based out of Kelowna, British Columbia, where they trained with their coach Bob Ursel. Later in the season, they had another successful run at the Japanese national championships in 2023. There, they went 7–1 in the round robin, before winning the 1 vs. 2 game against Kohsuke Hirata, and beating Hirata again in the final. The win qualified the team to represent Japan at the 2023 World Men's Curling Championship. At just the age of 16, Yamamoto, was dubbed a "fan favourite" of the crowds at the World Championships in Ottawa. At the Worlds, the team finished with a 5–7 record, missing the playoffs and finishing seventh overall.

== Personal life ==
As of 2023, Yamamoto is a high school student.
