= Satoshi Koizumi =

Japanese curler

- Curler
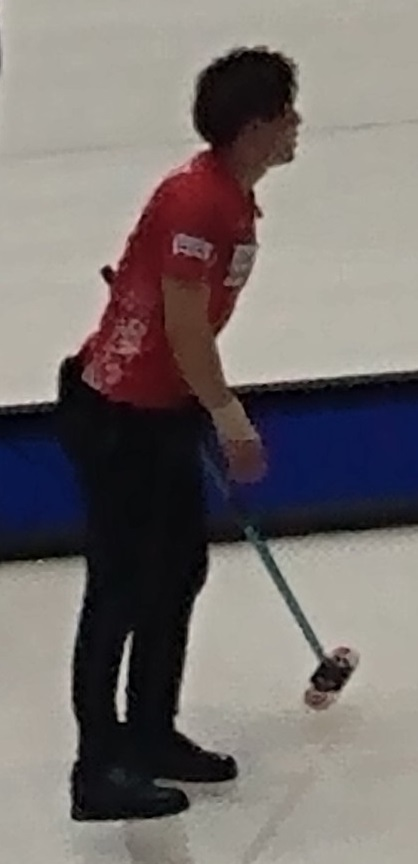
- Born: 26 December 1987 (age 38); Nagano

Team
- Curling club: SC Karuizawa Club, Karuizawa, Nagano
- Skip: Tsuyoshi Yamaguchi
- Fourth: Riku Yanagisawa
- Second: Takeru Yamamoto
- Lead: Satoshi Koizumi
- Alternate: Yasumasa Tanida

Curling career
- Member Association: Japan
- World Championship: 3 (2023, 2025, 2026)
- Pan Continental Championship: 3 (2022, 2023, 2025)
Medal record
Men's curling
Representing Japan
Pan Continental Championships
Bronze medal – third place	2023 Kelowna
Bronze medal – third place	2025 Virginia
Representing Nagano
Japan Curling Championships
Gold medal – first place	2022 Tokoro
Gold medal – first place	2023 Tokoro
Gold medal – first place	2025 Yokohama
Gold medal – first place	2026 Yokohama
Silver medal – second place	2024 Sapporo
Bronze medal – third place	2020 Karuizawa

Satoshi Koizumi (小泉 聡, Koizumi Satoshi; born 26 December 1987) is a Japanese curler. He is a two-time Japanese men's champion, playing lead for the SC Karuizawa team, skipped by Tsuyoshi Yamaguchi.

== Career ==
Koizumi joined the SC Karuizawa team in 2018, initially throwing third stones on the team, which was skipped by Tsuyoshi Yamaguchi. He began throwing second stones in 2019, when the team's alternate Riku Yanagisawa was promoted to third. The team played in the 2020 Japan Curling Championships, where went 6–2 in the round robin. In the playoffs, they defeated Yuya Takigahira in the 3 vs. 4 game, before losing to Yusuke Morozumi in the semifinal. That season, the team played in many tour events, winning the Moosehead Fall Open in Canada, and the Keijinkai Rizing Cup back home in Japan.

The team played in the 2021 Japanese Championship as well, finishing the round robin with a 4–2 record. However, in the playoffs, they lost in the 3 vs. 4 game to Morozumi.

The following season, Yanagisawa took over as skip of the Karuizawa SC team, with Yamaguchi throwing third rocks, 15 year old Takeru Yamamoto throwing second, and Koizumi now at lead. The team went undefeated in the round robin of the 2022 Japanese championship. In the playoffs, they lost the 1 vs. 2 game to Hayato Sato's Sapporo International University team. They rebounded by defeating Yasumasa Tanida in the semifinal, before defeating Sato in the final, winning the gold medal.

With the win, the team represented Japan at the inaugural 2022 Pan Continental Curling Championships. There, he led Japan to a 3–4 round robin record. This was still good enough to make it to the playoffs, but they lost the semifinal to Canada, and the bronze medal game to the United States. The team had a strong season on the tour, winning the Prestige Hotels & Resorts Curling Classic, Karuizawa International Curling Championships and the King Cash Spiel. The team would tour Canada for over three months from August to December, and were based out of Kelowna, British Columbia, where they trained with their coach Bob Ursel. Later in the season, they had another successful run at the Japanese national championships in 2023. There, they went 7–1 in the round robin, before winning the 1 vs. 2 game against Kohsuke Hirata, and beating Hirata again in the final. The win qualified the team to represent Japan at the 2023 World Men's Curling Championship. At the Worlds, the team finished with a 5–7 record, missing the playoffs and finishing seventh overall.

== Personal life ==
Koizumi is employed as a curling instructor and office worker.
