= Miku Nihira =

Japanese curler (born 2002)

- Curler
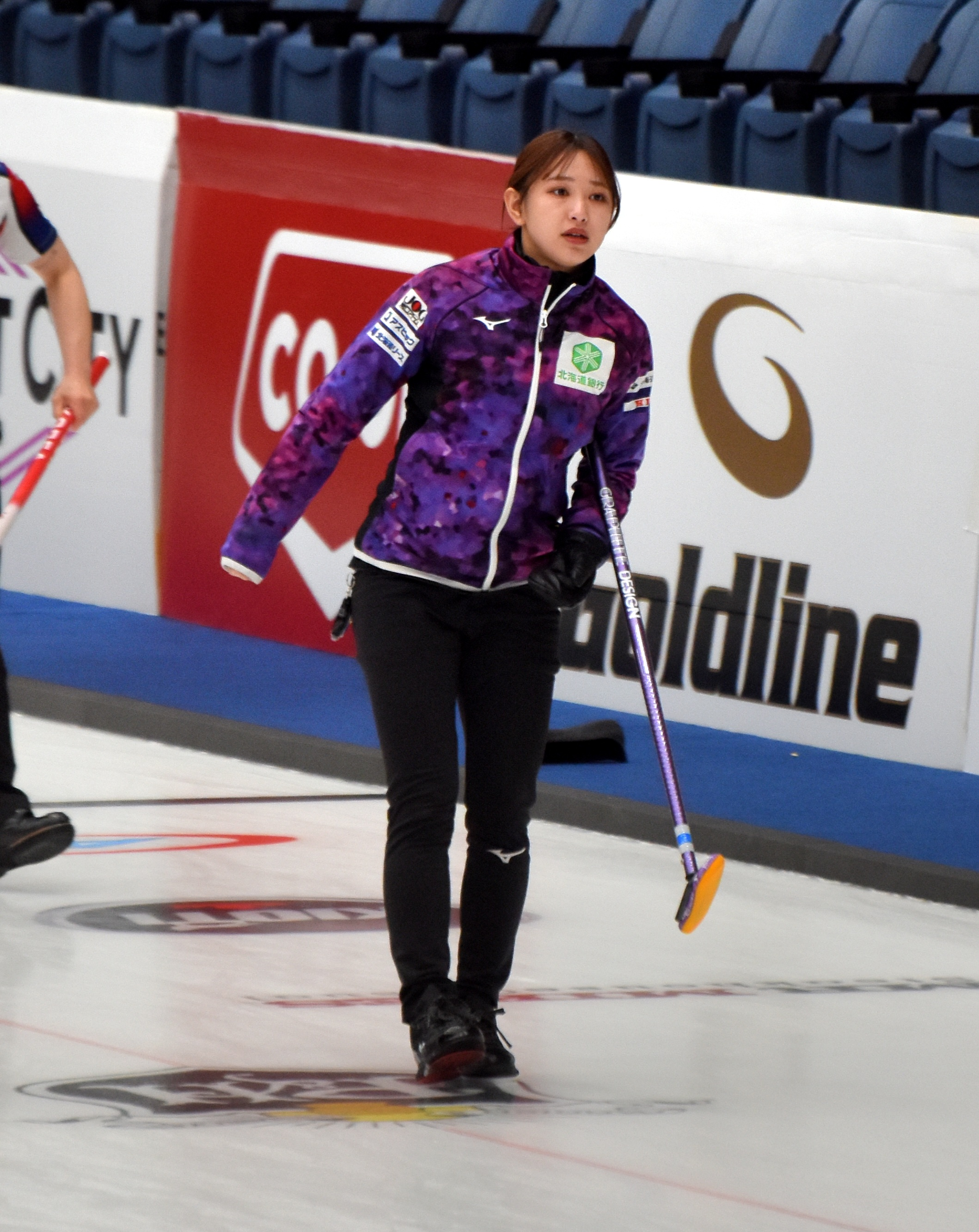
- Born: 29 August 2002 (age 24)

Team
- Curling club: Hokkaido Bank, Sapporo
- Skip: Miku Nihira
- Third: Momoha Tabata
- Second: Sae Yamamoto
- Lead: Mikoto Nakajima

Curling career
- Member Association: Japan
Medal record
Curling
Representing Japan
World Junior Championships
Silver medal – second place	2024 Lohja
Representing Hokkaido
Japan Curling Championships
Silver medal – second place	2024 Sapporo
Silver medal – second place	2025 Yokohama
Silver medal – second place	2026 Yokohama
Bronze medal – third place	2022 Tokoro

Miku Nihira (Japanese: 仁平美来; born 29 August 2002) is a Japanese curler from Sapporo. She currently skips her own team, known in Japan as the Hokkaido Bank curling team.

== Career ==
Nihira began curling in 2014 after being selected as one of the first group of students for the Hokkaido Talent Athlete Discovery Development Project.

Nihira joined Team Hokkaido Bank in 2021. Playing third on the team, skipped by Momoha Tabata, Nihira won a bronze medal at the 2022 Japan Curling Championships. With Nihira taking over as skip, but throwing third stones, the rink won a silver medal at the 2024 Japan Curling Championships, losing in the final to SC Karuizawa Club, skipped by Miyu Ueno.

Nihira skipped the Japanese team, which also consisted of Tabata, Yuina Miura, Mikoto Nakajima and Yui Ueno, at the 2024 World Junior Curling Championships. There, she led the team to a 7–2 round robin record. In the playoffs, the team defeated Norway (skipped by Torild Bjørnstad) in the semifinal before losing to Switzerland (Xenia Schwaller) in the final, settling for a silver medal.

Following juniors, the rink had a strong 2024–25 curling season on the women's tour, winning the Ice Gold Cup, the Argo Graphics Cup, the Saville Shootout, the Red Deer Curling Classic and the Saville U25 Challenge events. The team made their Grand Slam debut at the 2024 Tour Challenge Tier 2 event, where they lost in the semifinals to their compatriots, Sayaka Yoshimura (Team Fortius). The team made their Tier 1 Grand Slam debut at the 2024 Canadian Open, where the finished with a win-less 0–4 record. At the next slam, the 2024 National, they improved to a 1–3 record. And in the fourth slam of the year, the 2025 Masters, they improved once again, finishing the group stage with a 2–2 record. They then beat Team Danielle Inglis in a tiebreaker, before bowing out in the quarter finals to team Anna Hasselborg, who earned the right to select Team Tabata as they playoff opponent in a draft.

The rink won another silver medal at the 2025 Japan Curling Championships, losing in the final to fellow Sapporo rink Sayaka Yoshimura. Nihira would win their third silver medal at the 2026 Japan Curling Championships, this time losing to Miyu Ueno in the final 7–6.

== Personal life ==
She attended the Hokkaido University of Education. Before curling, Nihira competed in karate for 10 years.

== Grand Slam record ==
Key
C	Champion
F	Lost in Final
SF	Lost in Semifinal
QF	Lost in Quarterfinals
R16	Lost in the round of 16
Q	Did not advance to playoffs
T2	Played in Tier 2 event
DNP	Did not participate in event
N/A	Not a Grand Slam event that season

Event	2024–25	2025–26	2026–27
Invitational	T2	Q	Q
Masters	QF	QF	F
National	Q	Q	F
Open	Q	SF	
Players'	Q	Q	
