= Makoto Tsuruga =

Japanese curler

Makoto Tsuruga (敦賀 信人, Tsuruga Makoto; born November 3, 1977 in Kitami, Hokkaido) is a Japanese curler. He represented Japan at the 1998 Winter Olympics in Nagano, where the Japanese team placed 5th. He was the skip for the Japanese team at the 2010 World Men's Curling Championship.

== Teams ==
Season	Skip	Third	Second	Lead	Alternate	Events
1995–96	Hiroshi Sato	Makoto Tsuruga	Kazuhito Hori	Shinya Abe	Hiroshi Tsuruga	WJCC 1996 (7th)
1996–97	Makoto Tsuruga	Hiroaki Kashiwagi	Jun Nakayama	Kazuto Yanagizawa	Keita Yanagizawa	WJCC 1997 (4th)
1997–98	Makoto Tsuruga	Hiroshi Sato	Yoshiyuki Ohmiya	Hirofumi Kudo	Hisaaki Nakamine	WOG 1998 (5th)
1997–98	Makoto Tsuruga	Hiroshi Sato	Kazuhito Hori	Shinya Abe	Yusuke Hirosawa	WJCC 1998 (5th)
1998–99	Makoto Tsuruga	Kazuhito Hori	Hiroshi Sato	Naoki Kudo	Yoshiyuki Ohmiya	PCC 1998 (silver)
1999–00	Makoto Tsuruga	Hiroshi Sato	Kazuhito Hori	Naoki Kudo	Shinya Abe	JMCC 2000
2000–01	Makoto Tsuruga	Kazuhito Hori	? Fujisawa	? Fujisawa		JMCC 2001
2001–02	Makoto Tsuruga	Shuichiro Omote	Kogo Shiga	? Fujisawa		JMCC 2002
2003–04	Yoshiyuki Ohmiya	Makoto Tsuruga	Kazuhiko Ikawa	Yuji Hirama	Kosuke Aisaka	JMCC 2004 (gold)
2004–05	Yoshiyuki Ohmiya	Makoto Tsuruga	Kazuhiko Ikawa	Yuji Hirama	Tsuyoshi Ryutaki	JMCC 2005 (gold)
2005–06	Yoshiyuki Ohmiya	Makoto Tsuruga	Kazuhiko Ikawa	Yuji Hirama	Tsuyoshi Ryutaki	PCC 2005 (silver)
2005–06	Yoshiyuki Ohmiya	Makoto Tsuruga	Tsuyoshi Ryutaki	Kazuhiko Ikawa	Yuji Hirama	WCC 2006 (11th)
2006–07	Makoto Tsuruga	Tsuyoshi Ryutaki	Kazuhiko Ikawa	Yusaku Shibaya		JMCC 2007
2007–08	Makoto Tsuruga	Yuki Sawamukai	Tsuyoshi Ryutaki	Tsubasa Sato	Yusaku Shibaya	JMCC 2008
2008–09	Makoto Tsuruga	Yuki Sawamukai	Yusaku Shibaya	Ryosuke Haneishi	Ryoji Onodera	JMCC 2009
2009–10	Makoto Tsuruga	Yuki Sawamukai	Yusaku Shibaya	Ryosuke Haneishi	Ryuya Ishigaki	WCC 2010 (12th)
2010–11	Makoto Tsuruga	Yuki Sawamukai	Yusaku Shibaya	Ryosuke Haneishi	Taichi Teramachi	PCC 2010 (6th)
2011–12	Makoto Tsuruga	Yuki Sawamukai	Yusaku Shibaya	Ryosuke Haneishi	Taichi Teramachi	PCC 2011 (6th)
2012–13	Makoto Tsuruga	Yuki Sawamukai	Yusaku Shibaya	Ryosuke Haneishi	Taichi Teramachi	JMCC 2013
