= Yui Ueno =

Japanese curler

- Curler
- Born: December 17, 2002 (age 23); Nagano, Nagano

Team
- Curling club: Karuizawa CC, Karuizawa
- Skip: Miyu Ueno
- Third: Asuka Kanai
- Second: Yui Ozeki
- Lead: Yui Ueno

Curling career
- Member Association: Japan
- World Championship: 1 (2024)
- Pan Continental Championship: 1 (2024)
Medal record
Women's curling
Representing Japan
World Junior Curling Championships
| Gold medal – first place | 2022 Jönköping |
| Silver medal – second place | 2023 Füssen |
| Silver medal – second place | 2024 Lohja |
Representing Nagano
Japan Curling Championships
| Gold medal – first place | 2024 Sapporo |
| Gold medal – first place | 2026 Yokohama |

Yui Ueno (上野 結生, Ueno Yui; born December 17, 2002) is a Japanese curler. She currently plays lead on the SC Karuizawa Club curling team skipped by Miyu Ueno. She is a former World Junior champion.

== Career ==
=== Junior ===
Ueno first represented Japan at the 2016 World Junior B Curling Championships, where she was the alternate for the team, which was skipped by Ayano Tsuchiya. There the team finished in second place, though Ueno did not play in any games. This qualied Japan for the 2016 World Junior Curling Championships, where Ueno played second, replacing her sister Miyu who could not play due to having high school entrance exams. At the World Juniors, the team finished in last place with an 0–9 record.

Ueno was the second on the Japanese team (skipped by Sae Yamamoto) for the 2019–20 season. That season, the team won the World Junior-B Curling Championships and represented Japan at the 2020 World Junior Curling Championships. There, the finished in fourth place.

Ueno played second on the Japanese team (skipped by Yamamoto, who threw lead rocks) at the 2022 World Junior Curling Championships. There, the team finished the round robin with a 6–3 record. In the playoffs, the team won both of their games, including beating Sweden (skipped by Moa Dryburgh) in the final, to win the gold medal. It was the first time Japan won a gold medal in any curling discipline.

The following season, played second again for Japan at the 2023 World Junior Curling Championships, this time on a team skipped by Yuina Miura. There, the team finished the round robin with another 6–3 record. In the playoffs, they defeated Switzerland (skipped by Xenia Schwaller) in the semifinals, but lost in the gold medal game to Scotland (Fay Henderson).

Ueno played for Japan again at the 2024 World Junior Curling Championships, this time as the alternate, on a team skipped by Momoha Tabata. There, the team finished round robin play with a 7–2 record. In the semifinals, they beat Norway's Torild Bjørnestad rink. In the final, they faced-off against Xenia Schwaller and Switzerland again, but this time could not beat her, settling for another silver medal. Even though she was the team's alternate, Ueno played in seven matches.

=== Women's ===
In her last season of juniors, Ueno also played women's curling, playing lead for her sister Miyu's team. In just their first season together, the rink won the 2024 Japan Curling Championships, beating Miku Nihira in the final. The win earned the team the right to represent Japan at the 2024 World Women's Curling Championship, where they went 3–9.

== Personal life ==
Ueno is currently an environment and tourism student at Nagano University.
