= 2024 Wakkanai Midori Challenge Cup =

- Host city: Wakkanai, Japan
- Arena: Wakkanai City Midori Sports Park
- Dates: August 8–11
- Men's winner: (Hokkaido) Team Abe
- Curling club: Tokoro CC, Tokoro, Hokkaido
- Skip: Shinya Abe
- Fourth: Tetsuro Shimizu
- Second: Haruto Ouchi
- Lead: Hayato Sato
- Alternate: Sota Tsuruga
- Coach: Makoto Tsuruga
- Finalist: (Hokkaido) Takumi Maeda
- Women's winner: (Nagano Prefecture) Team Kitazawa
- Curling club: Karuizawa CC, Karuizawa
- Skip: Ikue Kitazawa
- Third: Seina Nakajima
- Second: Ami Enami
- Lead: Minori Suzuki
- Alternate: Hasumi Ishigooka
- Coach: Yusuke Morozumi
- Finalist: (Hokkaido) Sayaka Yoshimura

The 2024 Wakkanai Midori Challenge Cup was held from August 8 to 11 at the Wakkanai City Midori Sports Park in Wakkanai, Japan. It was the third tour event of the 2024–25 curling season and the first event of the Hokkaido Curling Tour. The total purse for the event was ¥ 1,700,000 on both the men's and women's sides.

== Men ==
=== Teams ===
The teams are listed as follows:

| Skip | Third | Second | Lead | Alternate | Locale |
|---|---|---|---|---|---|
| Tetsuro Shimizu (Fourth) | Shinya Abe (Skip) | Haruto Ouchi | Hayato Sato | Sota Tsuruga | (Hokkaido) Sapporo |
| Kaito Fujii | Miki Yamamoto | Konosuke Takahashi | Shunsuke Kanakawa | Taiji Tozawa | (Nagano Prefecture) Karuizawa |
| Kohsuke Hirata | Shingo Usui | Ryota Meguro | Yoshiya Miura | | (Hokkaido) Kitami |
| Toshiya Ilda | Yuta Fuse | Koto Inaba | Kento Nishida | | (Hokkaido) Wakkanai |
| Kim Hak-jun | Park Jin-hwan | Park Jong-hyeon | Kim Myeong-jun | | (South Korea) Uiseong |
| Takumi Maeda | Asei Nakahara | Hiroki Maeda | Uryu Kamikawa | Ryoji Onodera | (Hokkaido) Tokoro |
| Yusuke Morozumi | Yuta Matsumura | Ryotaro Shukuya | Masaki Iwai | Kosuke Morozumi | (Nagano Prefecture) Karuizawa |
| Taia Nakahara | Yota Michitani | Shunta Kobayashi | Taiki Kudo | Sasaki Ayato | (Hokkaido) Kitami |
| Kouki Ogiwara | Yousuke Abe | Yuto Abe | Yuta Kimura | Yuki Ohno | (Hokkaido) Sapporo |
| Riku Yanagisawa | Tsuyoshi Yamaguchi | Takeru Yamamoto | Satoshi Koizumi | | (Nagano Prefecture) Karuizawa |

=== Round robin standings ===
Final Round Robin Standings

Key
| Teams to Playoffs |

| Pool A | W | L | W–L | PF | PA | DSC |
|---|---|---|---|---|---|---|
| (Hokkaido) Shinya Abe | 3 | 1 | 1–0 | 25 | 19 | 43.76 |
| (Hokkaido) Takumi Maeda | 3 | 1 | 0–1 | 33 | 16 | 51.16 |
| (Nagano Prefecture) Riku Yanagisawa | 2 | 2 | – | 24 | 20 | 34.06 |
| (South Korea) Kim Hak-jun | 1 | 3 | 1–0 | 21 | 31 | 58.61 |
| (Hokkaido) Kouki Ogiwara | 1 | 3 | 0–1 | 12 | 29 | 39.39 |

| Pool B | W | L | W–L | PF | PA | DSC |
|---|---|---|---|---|---|---|
| (Nagano Prefecture) Yusuke Morozumi | 4 | 0 | – | 28 | 14 | 39.60 |
| (Hokkaido) Kohsuke Hirata | 3 | 1 | – | 21 | 13 | 33.17 |
| (Hokkaido) Toshiya Ilda | 2 | 2 | – | 18 | 25 | 60.81 |
| (Nagano Prefecture) Kaito Fujii | 1 | 3 | – | 16 | 18 | 34.79 |
| (Hokkaido) Taia Nakahara | 0 | 4 | – | 10 | 23 | 64.00 |

=== Round robin results ===
All draw times are listed in Japan Standard Time (UTC+09:00).

==== Draw 1 ====
Thursday, August 8, 10:30 am

| Sheet A | 1 | 2 | 3 | 4 | 5 | 6 | 7 | 8 | Final |
| (Hokkaido) Kohsuke Hirata 🔨 | 2 | 2 | 1 | 1 | 1 | 1 | 0 | X | 8 |
| (Hokkaido) Taia Nakahara | 0 | 0 | 0 | 0 | 0 | 0 | 1 | X | 1 |

| Sheet B | 1 | 2 | 3 | 4 | 5 | 6 | 7 | 8 | Final |
| (Hokkaido) Shinya Abe | 0 | 0 | 4 | 0 | 0 | 0 | 0 | 2 | 6 |
| (Hokkaido) Takumi Maeda 🔨 | 0 | 2 | 0 | 2 | 0 | 1 | 0 | 0 | 5 |

| Sheet C | 1 | 2 | 3 | 4 | 5 | 6 | 7 | 8 | Final |
| (Nagano Prefecture) Riku Yanagisawa 🔨 | 1 | 1 | 0 | 0 | 2 | 1 | 3 | X | 8 |
| (Hokkaido) Kouki Ogiwara | 0 | 0 | 0 | 0 | 0 | 0 | 0 | X | 0 |

| Sheet D | 1 | 2 | 3 | 4 | 5 | 6 | 7 | 8 | Final |
| (Nagano Prefecture) Yusuke Morozumi | 0 | 0 | 1 | 0 | 1 | 1 | 2 | 0 | 5 |
| (Nagano Prefecture) Kaito Fujii 🔨 | 0 | 2 | 0 | 0 | 0 | 0 | 0 | 1 | 3 |

==== Draw 3 ====
Thursday, August 8, 6:00 pm

| Sheet A | 1 | 2 | 3 | 4 | 5 | 6 | 7 | 8 | Final |
| (Hokkaido) Kouki Ogiwara | 0 | 0 | 0 | 3 | 0 | 1 | 0 | 1 | 5 |
| (Hokkaido) Shinya Abe 🔨 | 0 | 1 | 0 | 0 | 1 | 0 | 0 | 0 | 2 |

| Sheet B | 1 | 2 | 3 | 4 | 5 | 6 | 7 | 8 | Final |
| (Hokkaido) Taia Nakahara | 0 | 0 | 0 | 1 | 0 | 0 | 1 | X | 2 |
| (Nagano Prefecture) Yusuke Morozumi 🔨 | 1 | 1 | 0 | 0 | 1 | 2 | 0 | X | 5 |

| Sheet C | 1 | 2 | 3 | 4 | 5 | 6 | 7 | 8 | Final |
| (Nagano Prefecture) Kaito Fujii 🔨 | 0 | 1 | 0 | 0 | 1 | 0 | 3 | 1 | 6 |
| (Hokkaido) Toshiya Ilda | 0 | 0 | 1 | 2 | 0 | 4 | 0 | 0 | 7 |

| Sheet D | 1 | 2 | 3 | 4 | 5 | 6 | 7 | 8 | Final |
| (South Korea) Kim Hak-jun | 0 | 2 | 0 | 1 | 0 | 1 | 0 | 0 | 4 |
| (Nagano Prefecture) Riku Yanagisawa 🔨 | 1 | 0 | 2 | 0 | 1 | 0 | 0 | 2 | 6 |

==== Draw 5 ====
Friday, August 9, 12:30 pm

| Sheet A | 1 | 2 | 3 | 4 | 5 | 6 | 7 | 8 | Final |
| (Hokkaido) Toshiya Ilda | 0 | 2 | 0 | 2 | 0 | 1 | 0 | X | 5 |
| (Nagano Prefecture) Yusuke Morozumi 🔨 | 2 | 0 | 2 | 0 | 3 | 0 | 2 | X | 9 |

| Sheet B | 1 | 2 | 3 | 4 | 5 | 6 | 7 | 8 | Final |
| (Nagano Prefecture) Kaito Fujii | 0 | 0 | 0 | 1 | 0 | 0 | 1 | 0 | 2 |
| (Hokkaido) Kohsuke Hirata 🔨 | 0 | 0 | 1 | 0 | 1 | 0 | 0 | 1 | 3 |

| Sheet C | 1 | 2 | 3 | 4 | 5 | 6 | 7 | 8 | Final |
| (Hokkaido) Shinya Abe 🔨 | 1 | 0 | 2 | 0 | 2 | 0 | 4 | X | 9 |
| (South Korea) Kim Hak-jun | 0 | 1 | 0 | 2 | 0 | 1 | 0 | X | 4 |

| Sheet D | 1 | 2 | 3 | 4 | 5 | 6 | 7 | 8 | Final |
| (Hokkaido) Takumi Maeda | 0 | 1 | 3 | 0 | 2 | 1 | 1 | X | 8 |
| (Hokkaido) Kouki Ogiwara 🔨 | 1 | 0 | 0 | 2 | 0 | 0 | 0 | X | 3 |

==== Draw 7 ====
Friday, August 9, 7:30 pm

| Sheet A | 1 | 2 | 3 | 4 | 5 | 6 | 7 | 8 | Final |
| (Hokkaido) Takumi Maeda 🔨 | 2 | 0 | 0 | 3 | 0 | 1 | 0 | 2 | 8 |
| (Nagano Prefecture) Riku Yanagisawa | 0 | 1 | 1 | 0 | 2 | 0 | 1 | 0 | 5 |

| Sheet B | 1 | 2 | 3 | 4 | 5 | 6 | 7 | 8 | Final |
| (Hokkaido) Kouki Ogiwara | 0 | 1 | 0 | 1 | 0 | 2 | 0 | X | 4 |
| (South Korea) Kim Hak-jun 🔨 | 2 | 0 | 5 | 0 | 2 | 0 | 2 | X | 11 |

| Sheet C | 1 | 2 | 3 | 4 | 5 | 6 | 7 | 8 | Final |
| (Nagano Prefecture) Yusuke Morozumi | 1 | 0 | 1 | 0 | 4 | 0 | 1 | 2 | 9 |
| (Hokkaido) Kohsuke Hirata 🔨 | 0 | 1 | 0 | 2 | 0 | 1 | 0 | 0 | 4 |

| Sheet D | 1 | 2 | 3 | 4 | 5 | 6 | 7 | 8 | Final |
| (Hokkaido) Toshiya Ilda 🔨 | 0 | 1 | 0 | 0 | 1 | 1 | 0 | 2 | 5 |
| (Hokkaido) Taia Nakahara | 0 | 0 | 2 | 1 | 0 | 0 | 1 | 0 | 4 |

==== Draw 9 ====
Saturday, August 10, 12:30 pm

| Sheet A | 1 | 2 | 3 | 4 | 5 | 6 | 7 | 8 | Final |
| (Hokkaido) Taia Nakahara | 1 | 0 | 0 | 1 | 1 | 0 | 0 | 0 | 3 |
| (Nagano Prefecture) Kaito Fujii 🔨 | 0 | 1 | 0 | 0 | 0 | 3 | 0 | 1 | 5 |

| Sheet B | 1 | 2 | 3 | 4 | 5 | 6 | 7 | 8 | Final |
| (Nagano Prefecture) Riku Yanagisawa 🔨 | 2 | 0 | 1 | 0 | 0 | 2 | 0 | X | 5 |
| (Hokkaido) Shinya Abe | 0 | 2 | 0 | 2 | 3 | 0 | 1 | X | 8 |

| Sheet C | 1 | 2 | 3 | 4 | 5 | 6 | 7 | 8 | Final |
| (South Korea) Kim Hak-jun | 0 | 0 | 0 | 0 | 2 | 0 | X | X | 2 |
| (Hokkaido) Takumi Maeda 🔨 | 3 | 1 | 2 | 4 | 0 | 2 | X | X | 12 |

| Sheet D | 1 | 2 | 3 | 4 | 5 | 6 | 7 | 8 | Final |
| (Hokkaido) Kohsuke Hirata 🔨 | 2 | 0 | 1 | 1 | 1 | 0 | 1 | X | 6 |
| (Hokkaido) Toshiya Ilda | 0 | 0 | 0 | 0 | 0 | 1 | 0 | X | 1 |

=== Playoffs ===
Semifinals
A1 | (Hokkaido) Shinya Abe | 4
B2 | (Hokkaido) Kohsuke Hirata | 3
B1 | (Nagano Prefecture) Yusuke Morozumi | 3
A2 | (Hokkaido) Takumi Maeda | 4

Final
A1 | (Hokkaido) Shinya Abe | 5
A2 | (Hokkaido) Takumi Maeda | 4
Third place game
B2 | (Hokkaido) Kohsuke Hirata | 5
B1 | (Nagano Prefecture) Yusuke Morozumi | 4

==== Semifinals ====
Sunday, August 11, 9:00 am

| Sheet B | 1 | 2 | 3 | 4 | 5 | 6 | 7 | 8 | Final |
| (Hokkaido) Shinya Abe | 0 | 0 | 1 | 1 | 0 | 0 | 0 | 2 | 4 |
| (Hokkaido) Kohsuke Hirata 🔨 | 0 | 2 | 0 | 0 | 0 | 1 | 0 | 0 | 3 |

| Sheet D | 1 | 2 | 3 | 4 | 5 | 6 | 7 | 8 | Final |
| (Nagano Prefecture) Yusuke Morozumi 🔨 | 1 | 0 | 1 | 0 | 0 | 0 | 1 | 0 | 3 |
| (Hokkaido) Takumi Maeda | 0 | 2 | 0 | 1 | 0 | 0 | 0 | 1 | 4 |

==== Third place game ====
Sunday, August 11, 12:30 pm

| Sheet C | 1 | 2 | 3 | 4 | 5 | 6 | 7 | 8 | 9 | Final |
| (Hokkaido) Kohsuke Hirata 🔨 | 1 | 0 | 2 | 0 | 0 | 0 | 1 | 0 | 1 | 5 |
| (Nagano Prefecture) Yusuke Morozumi | 0 | 0 | 0 | 1 | 1 | 1 | 0 | 1 | 0 | 4 |

==== Final ====
Sunday, August 11, 4:00 pm

| Sheet B | 1 | 2 | 3 | 4 | 5 | 6 | 7 | 8 | 9 | Final |
| (Hokkaido) Shinya Abe 🔨 | 1 | 0 | 0 | 0 | 1 | 0 | 2 | 0 | 1 | 5 |
| (Hokkaido) Takumi Maeda | 0 | 2 | 0 | 0 | 0 | 1 | 0 | 1 | 0 | 4 |

== Women ==
=== Teams ===
The teams are listed as follows:

| Skip | Third | Second | Lead | Alternate | Locale |
|---|---|---|---|---|---|
| Miyuki Kawamura | Maoko Kawahira | Lin En | Yukie Kitaguchi | | (Hokkaido) Obihiro |
| Ikue Kitazawa | Seina Nakajima | Ami Enami | Minori Suzuki | Hasumi Ishigooka | (Nagano Prefecture) Nagano |
| Mayu Minami | Kana Ogawa | Mizuki Saito | Moe Nomoto | | (Hokkaido) Sapporo |
| Yuina Miura | Ai Matsunaga | Yuna Sakuma | Hana Ikeda | Ryone Yasui | (Hokkaido) Nayoro |
| Misaki Tanaka (Fourth) | Miori Nakamura (Skip) | Haruka Kihara | Hiyori Ichinohe | | (Aomori Prefecture) Aomori |
| Mika Okuyama | Miyuki Kawamura | Tomoko Takeda | Chihiro Matsumoto | | (Hokkaido) Wakkanai |
| Eri Ogihara (Fourth) | Honoka Sasaki (Skip) | Miki Hayashi | Yako Matsuzawa | | (Hokkaido) Kitami |
| Momoha Tabata (Fourth) | Miku Nihira (Skip) | Sae Yamamoto | Mikoto Nakajima | Ayami Ito | (Hokkaido) Sapporo |
| Kohane Tsuruga | Aone Nakamura | Rin Suzuki | Kotoka Segawa | | (Hokkaido) Sapporo |
| Sayaka Yoshimura | Yuna Kotani | Kaho Onodera | Anna Ohmiya | Mina Kobayashi | (Hokkaido) Sapporo |

=== Round robin standings ===
Final Round Robin Standings

Key
| Teams to Playoffs |

| Pool A | W | L | W–L | PF | PA | DSC |
|---|---|---|---|---|---|---|
| (Hokkaido) Sayaka Yoshimura | 4 | 0 | – | 30 | 14 | 82.91 |
| (Hokkaido) Mayu Minami | 2 | 2 | 1–1 | 24 | 21 | 41.50 |
| (Hokkaido) Mika Okuyama | 2 | 2 | 1–1 | 25 | 25 | 54.17 |
| (Aomori Prefecture) Miori Nakamura | 2 | 2 | 1–1 | 20 | 27 | 85.71 |
| (Hokkaido) Kohane Tsuruga | 0 | 4 | – | 20 | 32 | 41.36 |

| Pool B | W | L | W–L | PF | PA | DSC |
|---|---|---|---|---|---|---|
| (Nagano Prefecture) Ikue Kitazawa | 4 | 0 | – | 37 | 15 | 44.24 |
| (Hokkaido) Team Tabata | 3 | 1 | – | 22 | 16 | 52.46 |
| (Hokkaido) Honoka Sasaki | 2 | 2 | – | 15 | 23 | 97.27 |
| (Hokkaido) Yuina Miura | 1 | 3 | – | 17 | 23 | 58.14 |
| (Hokkaido) Miyuki Kawamura | 0 | 4 | – | 13 | 27 | 76.61 |

=== Round robin results ===
All draw times are listed in Japan Standard Time (UTC+09:00).

==== Draw 2 ====
Thursday, August 8, 2:00 pm

| Sheet A | 1 | 2 | 3 | 4 | 5 | 6 | 7 | 8 | Final |
| (Hokkaido) Honoka Sasaki | 0 | 1 | 0 | 0 | 0 | 1 | 0 | X | 2 |
| (Hokkaido) Team Tabata 🔨 | 0 | 0 | 0 | 2 | 3 | 0 | 0 | X | 5 |

| Sheet B | 1 | 2 | 3 | 4 | 5 | 6 | 7 | 8 | Final |
| (Hokkaido) Mayu Minami 🔨 | 3 | 3 | 1 | 0 | 1 | 0 | 1 | X | 9 |
| (Hokkaido) Mika Okuyama | 0 | 0 | 0 | 2 | 0 | 1 | 0 | X | 3 |

| Sheet C | 1 | 2 | 3 | 4 | 5 | 6 | 7 | 8 | Final |
| (Aomori Prefecture) Miori Nakamura | 0 | 0 | 2 | 0 | 0 | 2 | 2 | 1 | 7 |
| (Hokkaido) Kohane Tsuruga 🔨 | 2 | 1 | 0 | 2 | 1 | 0 | 0 | 0 | 6 |

| Sheet D | 1 | 2 | 3 | 4 | 5 | 6 | 7 | 8 | Final |
| (Nagano Prefecture) Ikue Kitazawa | 0 | 1 | 0 | 1 | 2 | 1 | 3 | X | 8 |
| (Hokkaido) Yuina Miura 🔨 | 2 | 0 | 2 | 0 | 0 | 0 | 0 | X | 4 |

==== Draw 4 ====
Friday, August 9, 9:00 am

| Sheet A | 1 | 2 | 3 | 4 | 5 | 6 | 7 | 8 | Final |
| (Hokkaido) Kohane Tsuruga | 0 | 1 | 0 | 0 | 2 | 0 | 0 | X | 3 |
| (Hokkaido) Mayu Minami 🔨 | 1 | 0 | 3 | 2 | 0 | 0 | 2 | X | 8 |

| Sheet B | 1 | 2 | 3 | 4 | 5 | 6 | 7 | 8 | Final |
| (Hokkaido) Team Tabata 🔨 | 0 | 2 | 0 | 1 | 0 | 0 | 1 | X | 4 |
| (Nagano Prefecture) Ikue Kitazawa | 0 | 0 | 2 | 0 | 3 | 2 | 0 | X | 7 |

| Sheet C | 1 | 2 | 3 | 4 | 5 | 6 | 7 | 8 | Final |
| (Hokkaido) Yuina Miura | 1 | 0 | 0 | 1 | 1 | 1 | 0 | X | 4 |
| (Hokkaido) Miyuki Kawamura 🔨 | 0 | 1 | 0 | 0 | 0 | 0 | 1 | X | 2 |

| Sheet D | 1 | 2 | 3 | 4 | 5 | 6 | 7 | 8 | Final |
| (Hokkaido) Sayaka Yoshimura 🔨 | 2 | 1 | 0 | 1 | 1 | 1 | 0 | X | 6 |
| (Aomori Prefecture) Miori Nakamura | 0 | 0 | 1 | 0 | 0 | 0 | 1 | X | 2 |

==== Draw 6 ====
Friday, August 9, 4:00 pm

| Sheet A | 1 | 2 | 3 | 4 | 5 | 6 | 7 | 8 | Final |
| (Hokkaido) Miyuki Kawamura | 0 | 2 | 2 | 0 | 1 | 0 | 0 | X | 5 |
| (Nagano Prefecture) Ikue Kitazawa 🔨 | 2 | 0 | 0 | 6 | 0 | 2 | 2 | X | 12 |

| Sheet B | 1 | 2 | 3 | 4 | 5 | 6 | 7 | 8 | Final |
| (Hokkaido) Yuina Miura | 0 | 0 | 2 | 0 | 1 | 1 | 1 | 0 | 5 |
| (Hokkaido) Honoka Sasaki 🔨 | 0 | 3 | 0 | 2 | 0 | 0 | 0 | 1 | 6 |

| Sheet C | 1 | 2 | 3 | 4 | 5 | 6 | 7 | 8 | Final |
| (Hokkaido) Mayu Minami | 0 | 0 | 1 | 0 | 0 | 1 | X | X | 2 |
| (Hokkaido) Sayaka Yoshimura 🔨 | 5 | 1 | 0 | 1 | 1 | 0 | X | X | 8 |

| Sheet D | 1 | 2 | 3 | 4 | 5 | 6 | 7 | 8 | 9 | Final |
| (Hokkaido) Mika Okuyama | 0 | 1 | 0 | 1 | 1 | 0 | 2 | 0 | 3 | 8 |
| (Hokkaido) Kohane Tsuruga 🔨 | 1 | 0 | 1 | 0 | 0 | 1 | 0 | 2 | 0 | 5 |

==== Draw 8 ====
Saturday, August 10, 9:00 am

| Sheet A | 1 | 2 | 3 | 4 | 5 | 6 | 7 | 8 | Final |
| (Hokkaido) Mika Okuyama 🔨 | 2 | 0 | 1 | 2 | 0 | 4 | 1 | X | 10 |
| (Aomori Prefecture) Miori Nakamura | 0 | 3 | 0 | 0 | 1 | 0 | 0 | X | 4 |

| Sheet B | 1 | 2 | 3 | 4 | 5 | 6 | 7 | 8 | Final |
| (Hokkaido) Kohane Tsuruga | 0 | 1 | 0 | 3 | 0 | 1 | 1 | X | 6 |
| (Hokkaido) Sayaka Yoshimura 🔨 | 3 | 0 | 3 | 0 | 3 | 0 | 0 | X | 9 |

| Sheet C | 1 | 2 | 3 | 4 | 5 | 6 | 7 | 8 | Final |
| (Nagano Prefecture) Ikue Kitazawa 🔨 | 2 | 4 | 2 | 2 | 0 | 0 | X | X | 10 |
| (Hokkaido) Honoka Sasaki | 0 | 0 | 0 | 0 | 1 | 1 | X | X | 2 |

| Sheet D | 1 | 2 | 3 | 4 | 5 | 6 | 7 | 8 | Final |
| (Hokkaido) Miyuki Kawamura 🔨 | 1 | 0 | 0 | 1 | 0 | 1 | 0 | X | 3 |
| (Hokkaido) Team Tabata | 0 | 0 | 1 | 0 | 3 | 0 | 2 | X | 6 |

==== Draw 10 ====
Saturday, August 10, 4:00 pm

| Sheet A | 1 | 2 | 3 | 4 | 5 | 6 | 7 | 8 | Final |
| (Hokkaido) Sayaka Yoshimura | 0 | 0 | 0 | 4 | 0 | 3 | 0 | X | 7 |
| (Hokkaido) Mika Okuyama 🔨 | 0 | 0 | 2 | 0 | 1 | 0 | 1 | X | 4 |

| Sheet B | 1 | 2 | 3 | 4 | 5 | 6 | 7 | 8 | Final |
| (Hokkaido) Honoka Sasaki | 0 | 1 | 1 | 0 | 1 | 0 | 2 | X | 5 |
| (Hokkaido) Miyuki Kawamura 🔨 | 1 | 0 | 0 | 1 | 0 | 1 | 0 | X | 3 |

| Sheet C | 1 | 2 | 3 | 4 | 5 | 6 | 7 | 8 | Final |
| (Hokkaido) Team Tabata | 0 | 1 | 1 | 1 | 0 | 3 | 0 | 1 | 7 |
| (Hokkaido) Yuina Miura 🔨 | 2 | 0 | 0 | 0 | 1 | 0 | 1 | 0 | 4 |

| Sheet D | 1 | 2 | 3 | 4 | 5 | 6 | 7 | 8 | Final |
| (Aomori Prefecture) Miori Nakamura | 0 | 0 | 4 | 0 | 2 | 0 | 0 | 1 | 7 |
| (Hokkaido) Mayu Minami 🔨 | 0 | 1 | 0 | 2 | 0 | 1 | 1 | 0 | 5 |

=== Playoffs ===
Semifinals
A1 | (Hokkaido) Sayaka Yoshimura | 5
B2 | (Hokkaido) Team Tabata | 4
B1 | (Nagano Prefecture) Ikue Kitazawa | 7
A2 | (Hokkaido) Mayu Minami | 4

Final
A1 | (Hokkaido) Sayaka Yoshimura | 4
B1 | (Nagano Prefecture) Ikue Kitazawa | 5
Third place game
B2 | (Hokkaido) Team Tabata | 6
A2 | (Hokkaido) Mayu Minami | 5

==== Semifinals ====
Sunday, August 11, 9:00 am

| Sheet A | 1 | 2 | 3 | 4 | 5 | 6 | 7 | 8 | Final |
| (Hokkaido) Sayaka Yoshimura | 0 | 1 | 0 | 0 | 1 | 0 | 1 | 2 | 5 |
| (Hokkaido) Team Tabata 🔨 | 2 | 0 | 0 | 1 | 0 | 1 | 0 | 0 | 4 |

| Sheet C | 1 | 2 | 3 | 4 | 5 | 6 | 7 | 8 | Final |
| (Nagano Prefecture) Ikue Kitazawa | 0 | 2 | 1 | 1 | 0 | 1 | 0 | 2 | 7 |
| (Hokkaido) Mayu Minami 🔨 | 1 | 0 | 0 | 0 | 1 | 0 | 2 | 0 | 4 |

==== Third place game ====
Sunday, August 11, 12:30 pm

| Sheet B | 1 | 2 | 3 | 4 | 5 | 6 | 7 | 8 | Final |
| (Hokkaido) Team Tabata 🔨 | 1 | 0 | 3 | 0 | 0 | 0 | 0 | 2 | 6 |
| (Hokkaido) Mayu Minami | 0 | 2 | 0 | 1 | 1 | 1 | 0 | 0 | 5 |

==== Final ====
Sunday, August 11, 4:00 pm

| Sheet C | 1 | 2 | 3 | 4 | 5 | 6 | 7 | 8 | Final |
| (Hokkaido) Sayaka Yoshimura 🔨 | 1 | 0 | 0 | 1 | 0 | 2 | 0 | 0 | 4 |
| (Nagano Prefecture) Ikue Kitazawa | 0 | 1 | 1 | 0 | 1 | 0 | 0 | 2 | 5 |
