= 2023 Wakkanai Midori Challenge Cup =

- Host city: Wakkanai, Japan
- Arena: Wakkanai City Midori Sports Park
- Dates: August 10–13
- Men's winner: Team Morozumi
- Curling club: Karuizawa CC, Karuizawa
- Skip: Yusuke Morozumi
- Third: Yuta Matsumura
- Second: Ryotaro Shukuya
- Lead: Masaki Iwai
- Alternate: Kosuke Morozumi
- Finalist: Hayato Sato
- Women's winner: Team Yoshimura
- Curling club: Hokkaido Bank CS, Sapporo
- Skip: Yuna Kotani
- Third: Kaho Onodera
- Second: Anna Ohmiya
- Lead: Mina Kobayashi
- Alternate: Sayaka Yoshimura
- Coach: Yumie Funayama
- Finalist: Kohane Tsuruga

The 2023 Wakkanai Midori Challenge Cup was held from August 10 to 13 at the Wakkanai City Midori Sports Park in Wakkanai, Japan. It was the third tour event of the 2023–24 curling season and the second event of the Hokkaido Curling Tour. The total purse for the event was ¥ 1,700,000 on both the men's and women's sides.

== Men ==
=== Teams ===
The teams are listed as follows:

Skip	Third	Second	Lead	Alternate	Locale
Tetsuro Shimizu (Fourth)	Haruto Ouchi	Shinya Abe (Skip)	Sota Tsuruga	Makoto Tsuruga	Sapporo
Kohsuke Hirata	Shingo Usui	Ryota Meguro	Yoshiya Miura	Kosuke Aita	Kitami
Juon Ishimura (Fourth)	Youn Ishimura (Skip)	Yuto Nakagawa	Shunki Kudo		Aomori
Kantaro Kawano	Kazuki Matsuoka	Shun Takahashi	Genji Ohara	Keita Nishizawa	Sapporo
Takumi Maeda	Asei Nakahara	Uryu Kamikawa	– (Note: Team Maeda played with three players.)		Kitami
Yusuke Morozumi	Yuta Matsumura	Ryotaro Shukuya	Masaki Iwai	Kosuke Morozumi	Karuizawa
Go Aoki (Fourth)	Hayato Sato (Skip)	Kouki Ogiwara	Kazushi Nino	Ayato Sasaki	Sapporo
Riku Yanagisawa	Tsuyoshi Yamaguchi	Takeru Yamamoto	Satoshi Koizumi		Karuizawa

=== Round robin standings ===
Final Round Robin Standings

Key
Teams to Playoffs

Pool A	W	L	W–L	PF	PA	DSC
Riku Yanagisawa	3	0	–	31	9	28.34
Takumi Maeda	1	2	1–1	20	17	39.94
Shinya Abe	1	2	1–1	15	21	44.48
Youn Ishimura	1	2	1–1	9	28	116.38

Pool B	W	L	W–L	PF	PA	DSC
Yusuke Morozumi	3	0	–	22	13	30.12
Hayato Sato	2	1	–	19	19	17.22
Kohsuke Hirata	1	2	–	21	14	20.38
Kantaro Kawano	0	3	–	10	26	33.76

=== Round robin results ===
All draw times are listed in Japan Standard Time (UTC+09:00).

==== Draw 1 ====
Thursday, August 10, 2:00 pm

Sheet A	1	2	3	4	5	6	7	8	Final
Takumi Maeda 🔨	2	1	1	2	2	3	X	X	11
Youn Ishimura	0	0	0	0	0	0	X	X	0

Sheet B	1	2	3	4	5	6	7	8	Final
Riku Yanagisawa 🔨	1	0	1	1	1	0	5	X	9
Shinya Abe	0	1	0	0	0	2	0	X	3

Sheet C	1	2	3	4	5	6	7	8	Final
Hayato Sato 🔨	3	0	2	0	1	0	0	1	7
Kohsuke Hirata	0	1	0	3	0	1	0	0	5

Sheet D	1	2	3	4	5	6	7	8	Final
Yusuke Morozumi	1	0	3	0	2	0	2	X	8
Kantaro Kawano 🔨	0	0	0	1	0	2	0	X	3

==== Draw 3 ====
Friday, August 11, 10:30 am

Sheet A	1	2	3	4	5	6	7	8	9	Final
Kohsuke Hirata	0	2	1	0	2	0	0	0	0	5
Yusuke Morozumi 🔨	1	0	0	1	0	0	2	1	1	6

Sheet B	1	2	3	4	5	6	7	8	Final
Hayato Sato 🔨	2	0	2	0	2	0	0	1	7
Kantaro Kawano	0	2	0	2	0	0	2	0	6

Sheet C	1	2	3	4	5	6	7	8	Final
Youn Ishimura	0	0	1	0	1	0	X	X	2
Riku Yanagisawa 🔨	3	2	0	3	0	3	X	X	11

Sheet D	1	2	3	4	5	6	7	8	Final
Takumi Maeda 🔨	1	0	0	2	1	0	0	1	5
Shinya Abe	0	3	0	0	0	2	1	0	6

==== Draw 5 ====
Friday, August 11, 5:30 pm

Sheet A	1	2	3	4	5	6	7	8	Final
Riku Yanagisawa	0	1	6	0	0	0	4	X	11
Takumi Maeda 🔨	1	0	0	1	1	1	0	X	4

Sheet B	1	2	3	4	5	6	7	8	Final
Yusuke Morozumi	0	0	2	0	2	0	3	1	8
Hayato Sato 🔨	1	0	0	3	0	1	0	0	5

Sheet C	1	2	3	4	5	6	7	8	Final
Shinya Abe 🔨	2	0	3	0	0	0	1	0	6
Youn Ishimura	0	3	0	0	2	1	0	1	7

Sheet D	1	2	3	4	5	6	7	8	Final
Kantaro Kawano	0	1	0	0	0	0	X	X	1
Kohsuke Hirata 🔨	2	0	4	1	2	2	X	X	11

=== Playoffs ===
Semifinals
A1	Riku Yanagisawa	5
B2	Hayato Sato	6
B1	Yusuke Morozumi	5
A2	Takumi Maeda	4

Final
B2	Hayato Sato	6
B1	Yusuke Morozumi	9
Third place game
A1	Riku Yanagisawa	8
A2	Takumi Maeda	4

==== Semifinals ====
Saturday, August 12, 2:00 pm

Sheet B	1	2	3	4	5	6	7	8	Final
Riku Yanagisawa 🔨	0	0	1	2	0	2	0	0	5
Hayato Sato	0	1	0	0	1	0	2	2	6

Sheet D	1	2	3	4	5	6	7	8	9	Final
Yusuke Morozumi 🔨	2	0	0	1	0	1	0	0	1	5
Takumi Maeda	0	2	0	0	0	0	0	2	0	4

==== Third place game ====
Sunday, August 13, 10:00 am

Sheet A	1	2	3	4	5	6	7	8	Final
Riku Yanagisawa 🔨	2	0	2	1	0	2	1	X	8
Takumi Maeda	0	3	0	0	1	0	0	X	4

==== Final ====
Sunday, August 13, 10:00 am

Sheet C	1	2	3	4	5	6	7	8	Final
Hayato Sato	0	2	0	2	1	0	0	1	6
Yusuke Morozumi 🔨	2	0	3	0	0	1	3	0	9

== Women ==
=== Teams ===
The teams are listed as follows:

Skip	Third	Second	Lead	Alternate	Locale
Kana Ogawa	Mizuki Saito	Mika Okuyama	Rimu Maruyama (Note: Rimu Maruyama spared for Mayu Minami. She played lead while the rest of the team each moved up a position in the lineup.)		Sapporo
Ai Matsunaga	Yuna Sakuma	Ayana Oikawa (Note: Ayana Oikawa spared on Team Miura.)	– (Note: Team Miura played with three players)		Nayoro
Misaki Tanaka (Fourth)	Miori Nakamura (Skip)	Haruka Kihara	– (Note: Team Nakamura played with three players.)		Aomori
Akari Hashimoto (Fourth)	Kotone Suzuki	Minami Nakao (Skip)	Aira Inada	Moka Tanaka	Sapporo
Honoka Sasaki	Mari Motohashi	Miki Hayashi	Mayumi Saito	Yako Matsuzawa	Kitami
Aone Nakamura (Fourth)	Natsuki Sato (Skip)	Himari Ichiyama	Hiori Ichiyama	Misako Kawahira	Obihiro
Kohane Tsuruga	Ayami Ito	Mikoto Nakajima	Suzune Yasui		Sapporo
Yuna Kotani (Note: As skip Sayaka Yoshimura was on maternity leave, the rest of the team moved up the lineup a position. Yoshimura was listed as the alternate on the roster, however.)	Kaho Onodera	Anna Ohmiya	Mina Kobayashi	Sayaka Yoshimura	Sapporo

=== Round robin standings ===
Final Round Robin Standings

Key
Teams to Playoffs

Pool A	W	L	W–L	PF	PA	DSC
Kohane Tsuruga	2	1	1–1	20	11	27.86
Honoka Sasaki	2	1	1–1	21	16	78.34
Miori Nakamura	2	1	1–1	16	17	86.36
Minami Nakao	0	3	–	11	24	65.52

Pool B	W	L	W–L	PF	PA	DSC
Team Yoshimura	3	0	–	30	7	20.18
Team Minami	1	2	1–1	13	15	39.18
Natsuki Sato	1	2	1–1	12	21	83.54
Team Miura	1	2	1–1	11	23	85.20

=== Round robin results ===
All draw times are listed in Japan Standard Time (UTC+09:00).

==== Draw 2 ====
Thursday, August 10, 5:30 pm

Sheet A	1	2	3	4	5	6	7	8	Final
Honoka Sasaki	0	0	1	0	1	0	2	0	4
Kohane Tsuruga 🔨	0	1	0	1	0	1	0	5	8

Sheet B	1	2	3	4	5	6	7	8	Final
Minami Nakao 🔨	0	1	0	1	2	0	1	X	5
Miori Nakamura	1	0	2	0	0	4	0	X	7

Sheet C	1	2	3	4	5	6	7	8	Final
Natsuki Sato	0	0	0	1	0	1	0	0	2
Team Minami 🔨	0	0	2	0	1	0	1	1	5

Sheet D	1	2	3	4	5	6	7	8	Final
Team Miura	0	0	0	0	1	0	1	X	2
Team Yoshimura 🔨	2	1	3	1	0	3	0	X	10

==== Draw 4 ====
Friday, August 11, 2:00 pm

Sheet A	1	2	3	4	5	6	7	8	Final
Team Minami 🔨	0	1	0	2	0	1	1	X	5
Team Miura	1	0	2	0	3	0	0	X	6

Sheet B	1	2	3	4	5	6	7	8	Final
Natsuki Sato	0	0	2	0	0	0	X	X	2
Team Yoshimura 🔨	0	5	0	3	4	1	X	X	13

Sheet C	1	2	3	4	5	6	7	8	Final
Kohane Tsuruga 🔨	1	0	0	1	1	1	4	X	8
Minami Nakao	0	1	1	0	0	0	0	X	2

Sheet D	1	2	3	4	5	6	7	8	Final
Honoka Sasaki	0	2	1	0	1	0	2	2	8
Miori Nakamura 🔨	2	0	0	1	0	1	0	0	4

==== Draw 6 ====
Saturday, August 12, 10:00 am

Sheet A	1	2	3	4	5	6	7	8	Final
Minami Nakao	0	2	0	1	0	1	X	X	4
Honoka Sasaki 🔨	2	0	4	0	3	0	X	X	9

Sheet B	1	2	3	4	5	6	7	8	Final
Team Miura	0	0	1	0	0	2	0	X	3
Natsuki Sato 🔨	0	1	0	2	3	0	2	X	8

Sheet C	1	2	3	4	5	6	7	8	Final
Miori Nakamura	0	1	0	0	1	0	2	1	5
Kohane Tsuruga 🔨	1	0	1	1	0	1	0	0	4

Sheet D	1	2	3	4	5	6	7	8	Final
Team Yoshimura 🔨	0	2	0	1	3	0	1	X	7
Team Minami	0	0	2	0	0	1	0	X	3

=== Playoffs ===
Semifinals
A1	Kohane Tsuruga	9
B2	Team Minami	1
B1	Team Yoshimura	8
A2	Honoka Sasaki	6

Final
A1	Kohane Tsuruga	3
B1	Team Yoshimura	8
Third place game
B2	Team Minami	2
A2	Honoka Sasaki	7

==== Semifinals ====
Saturday, August 12, 5:30 pm

Sheet A	1	2	3	4	5	6	7	8	Final
Kohane Tsuruga	0	0	1	1	2	2	3	X	9
Team Minami 🔨	0	1	0	0	0	0	0	X	1

Sheet C	1	2	3	4	5	6	7	8	9	Final
Team Yoshimura	0	1	0	1	0	3	1	0	2	8
Honoka Sasaki 🔨	0	0	2	0	2	0	0	2	0	6

==== Third place game ====
Sunday, August 13, 2:00 pm

Sheet D	1	2	3	4	5	6	7	8	Final
Team Minami 🔨	1	0	0	0	0	1	X	X	2
Honoka Sasaki	0	1	2	2	2	0	X	X	7

==== Final ====
Sunday, August 13, 2:00 pm

Sheet B	1	2	3	4	5	6	7	8	Final
Kohane Tsuruga 🔨	1	0	0	0	1	1	0	X	3
Team Yoshimura	0	2	0	2	0	0	4	X	8
