= Wakkanai Midori Challenge Cup =

- Established: 2022
- Host city: Wakkanai, Japan
- Arena: Wakkanai City Midori Sports Park
- Website: wmcc.w-curling.org
- Men's purse: ¥ 1,420,000
- Women's purse: ¥ 1,420,000

Current champions (2026)
- Men: (Nagano Prefecture) Tsuyoshi Yamaguchi
- Women: (Nagano Prefecture) Miyu Ueno

Current edition
- 2026 Wakkanai Midori Challenge Cup

The Wakkanai Midori Challenge Cup is an annual bonspiel, or curling tournament, held at the Wakkanai City Midori Sports Park in Wakkanai, Japan. It is held as part of the Hokkaido Curling Tour. The total purse for the event is ¥ 1,420,000 with the winning team receiving ¥ 800,000.

The tournament is held in a round robin format with the top four teams qualifying for the single elimination playoff round.

The event is streamed on the Hokkaido Curling Tour's YouTube page.

== Past Champions ==
=== Men ===
| Year | Winning team | Runner-up team | Purse (¥) |
|---|---|---|---|
| 2022 | (Hokkaido) Takumi Maeda, Uryu Kamikawa, Hiroki Maeda, Asei Nakahara | (Nagano Prefecture) Yusuke Morozumi, Yuta Matsumura, Ryotaro Shukuya, Kosuke Morozumi | 1,720,000 |
| 2023 | (Nagano Prefecture) Yusuke Morozumi, Yuta Matsumura, Ryotaro Shukuya, Masaki Iwai, Kosuke Morozumi | (Hokkaido) Go Aoki (Fourth), Hayato Sato (Skip), Kouki Ogiwara, Kazushi Nino, Ayato Sasaki | 1,700,000 |
| 2024 | (Hokkaido) Tetsuro Shimizu (Fourth), Shinya Abe (Skip), Haruto Ouchi, Hayato Sato, Sota Tsuruga | (Hokkaido) Takumi Maeda, Asei Nakahara, Hiroki Maeda, Uryu Kamikawa, Ryoji Onodera | 1,700,000 |
| 2025 | (Hokkaido) Takumi Maeda, Hiroki Maeda, Uryu Kamikawa (3 player team) | (Hokkaido) Kohsuke Hirata, Shingo Usui, Koei Sato, Ryota Meguro | 1,500,000 |
| 2026 | (Nagano Prefecture) Riku Yanagisawa (Fourth), Tsuyoshi Yamaguchi (Skip), Takeru Yamamoto, Satoshi Koizumi | (Hokkaido) Tetsuro Shimizu (Fourth), Shinya Abe (Skip), Asei Nakahara, Haruto Ouchi, Hayato Sato | 1,420,000 |

=== Women ===
| Year | Winning team | Runner-up team | Purse (¥) |
|---|---|---|---|
| 2022 | (Hokkaido) Sayaka Yoshimura, Kaho Onodera, Anna Ohmiya, Mina Kobayashi, Yumie Funayama | (Nagano Prefecture) Asuka Kanai, Ami Enami, Junko Nishimuro, Mone Ryokawa | 1,720,000 |
| 2023 | (Hokkaido) Yuna Kotani, Kaho Onodera, Anna Ohmiya, Mina Kobayashi, Sayaka Yoshimura | (Hokkaido) Kohane Tsuruga, Ayami Ito, Mikoto Nakajima, Suzune Yasui | 1,700,000 |
| 2024 | (Nagano Prefecture) Ikue Kitazawa, Seina Nakajima, Ami Enami, Minori Suzuki, Hasumi Ishigooka | (Hokkaido) Sayaka Yoshimura, Yuna Kotani, Kaho Onodera, Anna Ohmiya, Mina Kobayashi | 1,700,000 |
| 2025 | (Hokkaido) Satsuki Fujisawa, Chinami Yoshida, Yumi Suzuki, Yurika Yoshida | (Nagano Prefecture) Miyu Ueno, Yui Ueno, Asuka Kanai (3 player team) | 1,500,000 |
| 2026 | (Nagano Prefecture) Miyu Ueno, Yui Ueno, Asuka Kanai (3 player team) | (Hokkaido) Miku Nihira, Momoha Tabata, Sae Yamamoto, Mikoto Nakajima | 1,420,000 |
