= 2026 Wakkanai Midori Challenge Cup =

- Host city: Wakkanai, Japan
- Arena: Wakkanai City Midori Sports Park
- Dates: August 27–30
- Men's winner: (Nagano Prefecture) Team Yamaguchi
- Curling club: Karuizawa CC, Karuizawa
- Skip: Tsuyoshi Yamaguchi
- Fourth: Riku Yanagisawa
- Second: Takeru Yamamoto
- Lead: Satoshi Koizumi
- Finalist: (Hokkaido) Shinya Abe
- Women's winner: (Nagano Prefecture) Team Ueno
- Curling club: Karuizawa CC, Karuizawa
- Skip: Miyu Ueno
- Third: Yui Ueno
- Lead: Asuka Kanai
- Coach: Yuji Nishimuro
- Finalist: (Hokkaido) Miku Nihira

The 2026 Wakkanai Midori Challenge Cup was held from August 27 to 30 at the Wakkanai City Midori Sports Park in Wakkanai, Japan. It was the second event of the 2026–27 Hokkaido Curling Tour. The total purse for the event was ¥ 1,420,000 on both the men's and women's sides.

Team Kang Bo-bae withdrew from the event after the schedule was finalized. All of their games were counted as a win for their opponents.

== Men ==
=== Teams ===
The teams are listed as follows:

Skip	Third	Second	Lead	Alternate	Locale
Tetsuro Shimizu (Fourth)	Shinya Abe (Skip)	Haruto Ouchi	Hayato Sato	Asei Nakahara	(Hokkaido) Sapporo
Yuto Abe	Ayato Sasaki	Yuta Kimura	Akitsugu Yoshimoto	Yuken Hayashi	(Hokkaido) Sapporo
Kaito Fujii	Miki Yamamoto	Konosuke Takahashi	Shunsuke Kanagawa	Ruki Yokoyama	(Nagano Prefecture) Karuizawa
Go Aoki (Fourth)	Shingo Usui	Takeshi Aoyanagi	Kohsuke Hirata (Skip)	Ryota Meguro	(Hokkaido) Kitami
Toshiya Ilda	Yuta Fuse	Masao Ishidate	Kento Nishida		(Hokkaido) Wakkanai
Takumi Maeda	Hiroki Maeda	Uryu Kamikawa	Gakuto Tokoro		(Hokkaido) Tokoro
Tsubasa Nakagawa	Eito Nakagawa	Makoto Kabira	Ayumu Ota	Sakuraji Maeda	(Hokkaido) Obihiro
Kouki Ogiwara	Hinata Michitani	Chikara Segawa	Taiki Kudo	Shunta Kobayashi	(Hokkaido) Sapporo
P. N. Raju	Tucker Hellman	Carter Hellman	Kenneth Doan		(India) Hyderabad
Riku Yanagisawa (Fourth)	Tsuyoshi Yamaguchi (Skip)	Takeru Yamamoto	Satoshi Koizumi		(Nagano Prefecture) Karuizawa

=== Round robin standings ===
Final Round Robin Standings

Key
Teams to Playoffs

Pool A	W	L	W–L	PF	PA	DSC
(Hokkaido) Shinya Abe	4	0	–	31	12	25.1
(Nagano Prefecture) Kaito Fujii	3	1	–	21	14	27.4
(Hokkaido) Takumi Maeda	2	2	–	26	15	74.8
(Hokkaido) Yuto Abe	1	3	–	12	28	40.9
(India) P. N. Raju	0	4	–	7	28	80.1

Pool B	W	L	W–L	PF	PA	DSC
(Nagano Prefecture) Tsuyoshi Yamaguchi	4	0	–	31	9	26.2
(Hokkaido) Kohsuke Hirata	3	1	–	27	15	38.2
(Hokkaido) Kouki Ogiwara	2	2	–	25	25	27.5
(Hokkaido) Tsubasa Nakagawa	1	3	–	11	33	67.7
(Hokkaido) Toshiya Ilda	0	4	–	14	26	59.2

=== Round robin results ===
All draw times are listed in Japan Standard Time (UTC+09:00).

==== Draw 1 ====
Thursday, August 27, 10:30 am

Sheet A	1	2	3	4	5	6	7	8	Final
(Hokkaido) Kohsuke Hirata 🔨	2	0	0	2	0	4	1	X	9
(Hokkaido) Tsubasa Nakagawa	0	1	1	0	1	0	0	X	3

Sheet B	1	2	3	4	5	6	7	8	Final
(Hokkaido) Shinya Abe 🔨	0	1	0	2	2	1	0	1	7
(Hokkaido) Takumi Maeda	0	0	2	0	0	0	2	0	4

Sheet C	1	2	3	4	5	6	7	8	Final
(India) P. N. Raju	0	0	0	0	0	1	X	X	1
(Nagano Prefecture) Kaito Fujii 🔨	0	4	0	1	1	0	X	X	6

Sheet D	1	2	3	4	5	6	7	8	Final
(Hokkaido) Kouki Ogiwara 🔨	1	0	1	1	0	3	0	1	7
(Hokkaido) Toshiya Ilda	0	2	0	0	2	0	1	0	5

==== Draw 3 ====
Thursday, August 27, 6:00 pm

Sheet A	1	2	3	4	5	6	7	8	Final
(Nagano Prefecture) Kaito Fujii	0	0	0	0	2	2	0	X	4
(Hokkaido) Shinya Abe 🔨	0	3	1	1	0	0	2	X	7

Sheet B	1	2	3	4	5	6	7	8	Final
(Hokkaido) Tsubasa Nakagawa 🔨	1	0	1	0	0	0	X	X	2
(Hokkaido) Kouki Ogiwara	0	4	0	2	1	2	X	X	9

Sheet C	1	2	3	4	5	6	7	8	Final
(Hokkaido) Toshiya Ilda	0	1	0	1	0	0	0	X	2
(Nagano Prefecture) Tsuyoshi Yamaguchi 🔨	2	0	2	0	0	1	2	X	7

Sheet D	1	2	3	4	5	6	7	8	Final
(Hokkaido) Yuto Abe 🔨	1	1	0	0	0	1	1	1	5
(India) P. N. Raju	0	0	2	2	0	0	0	0	4

==== Draw 5 ====
Thursday, August 28, 12:30 pm

Sheet A	1	2	3	4	5	6	7	8	Final
(Nagano Prefecture) Tsuyoshi Yamaguchi 🔨	2	0	3	0	4	0	X	X	9
(Hokkaido) Kouki Ogiwara	0	1	0	1	0	2	X	X	4

Sheet B	1	2	3	4	5	6	7	8	Final
(Hokkaido) Toshiya Ilda	1	0	0	1	0	1	0	X	3
(Hokkaido) Kohsuke Hirata 🔨	0	1	1	0	2	0	2	X	6

Sheet C	1	2	3	4	5	6	7	8	Final
(Hokkaido) Shinya Abe 🔨	0	2	0	2	0	3	2	X	9
(Hokkaido) Yuto Abe	0	0	2	0	1	0	0	X	3

Sheet D	1	2	3	4	5	6	7	8	Final
(Hokkaido) Takumi Maeda	0	1	0	0	1	0	2	0	4
(Nagano Prefecture) Kaito Fujii 🔨	1	0	0	1	0	1	0	2	5

==== Draw 7 ====
Thursday, August 28, 7:30 pm

Sheet A	1	2	3	4	5	6	7	8	Final
(Hokkaido) Takumi Maeda 🔨	2	2	2	0	3	X	X	X	9
(India) P. N. Raju	0	0	0	1	0	X	X	X	1

Sheet B	1	2	3	4	5	6	7	8	Final
(Nagano Prefecture) Kaito Fujii 🔨	0	2	0	0	1	1	0	2	6
(Hokkaido) Yuto Abe	0	0	1	0	0	0	1	0	2

Sheet C	1	2	3	4	5	6	7	8	Final
(Hokkaido) Kouki Ogiwara 🔨	0	0	3	0	0	0	2	X	5
(Hokkaido) Kohsuke Hirata	1	1	0	3	1	3	0	X	9

Sheet D	1	2	3	4	5	6	7	8	Final
(Nagano Prefecture) Tsuyoshi Yamaguchi 🔨	1	3	2	2	2	1	X	X	11
(Hokkaido) Tsubasa Nakagawa	0	0	0	0	0	0	X	X	0

==== Draw 9 ====
Friday, August 29, 12:30 pm

Sheet A	1	2	3	4	5	6	7	8	Final
(Hokkaido) Tsubasa Nakagawa	0	2	0	1	0	0	3	X	6
(Hokkaido) Toshiya Ilda 🔨	1	0	1	0	0	2	0	X	4

Sheet B	1	2	3	4	5	6	7	8	Final
(Hokkaido) Kohsuke Hirata	0	0	1	0	0	2	0	0	3
(Nagano Prefecture) Tsuyoshi Yamaguchi 🔨	0	1	0	1	1	0	0	1	4

Sheet C	1	2	3	4	5	6	7	8	Final
(Hokkaido) Yuto Abe 🔨	0	1	0	0	1	0	0	X	2
(Hokkaido) Takumi Maeda	1	0	2	2	0	3	1	X	9

Sheet D	1	2	3	4	5	6	7	8	Final
(India) P. N. Raju	0	0	0	0	1	0	X	X	1
(Hokkaido) Shinya Abe 🔨	0	1	2	1	0	4	X	X	8

=== Playoffs ===
Semifinals
A1	(Hokkaido) Shinya Abe	6
B2	(Hokkaido) Kohsuke Hirata	2
B1	(Nagano Prefecture) Tsuyoshi Yamaguchi	7
A2	(Nagano Prefecture) Kaito Fujii	2

Final
A1	(Hokkaido) Shinya Abe	5
B1	(Nagano Prefecture) Tsuyoshi Yamaguchi	7
Third place game
B2	(Hokkaido) Kohsuke Hirata	8
A2	(Nagano Prefecture) Kaito Fujii	4

==== Semifinals ====
Sunday, August 30, 9:00 am

Sheet B	1	2	3	4	5	6	7	8	Final
(Hokkaido) Shinya Abe 🔨	1	0	2	0	2	1	0	X	6
(Hokkaido) Kohsuke Hirata	0	1	0	1	0	0	0	X	2

Sheet D	1	2	3	4	5	6	7	8	Final
(Nagano Prefecture) Tsuyoshi Yamaguchi 🔨	0	3	0	3	0	1	0	X	7
(Nagano Prefecture) Kaito Fujii	0	0	0	0	1	0	1	X	2

==== Third place game ====
Sunday, August 30, 12:30 pm

Sheet C	1	2	3	4	5	6	7	8	Final
(Hokkaido) Kohsuke Hirata 🔨	2	0	0	2	0	1	3	X	8
(Nagano Prefecture) Kaito Fujii	0	1	0	0	3	0	0	X	4

==== Final ====
Sunday, August 30, 4:00 pm

Sheet C	1	2	3	4	5	6	7	8	Final
(Hokkaido) Shinya Abe	0	0	2	0	2	0	1	0	5
(Nagano Prefecture) Tsuyoshi Yamaguchi 🔨	0	1	0	2	0	1	0	3	7

== Women ==
=== Teams ===
The teams are listed as follows:

Skip	Third	Second	Lead	Alternate	Locale
Himari Ichiyama	Yoshino Mitsukari	Hiori Ichiyama	Moeka Nakagawa	Shinyuki Tsuchiya	(Hokkaido) Obihiro
Kang Bo-bae	Kim Kyeong-ae	Shim Yu-jeong	Kim Ji-soo	Kim Min-seo	(South Korea) Jeonbuk
Kim Su-hyeon (Note: Kim Su-hyeon skipped Team Kim.)	Park Han-byul	Bang Yu-jin	Kim Hae-jeong	Kim Eun-jung	(South Korea) Uiseong
Ikue Kitazawa	Seina Nakajima	Minori Suzuki	Hasumi Ishigooka	Chiaki Matsumura	(Nagano Prefecture) Nagano
Yuina Miura	Kohane Tsuruga	Rin Suzuki	Aone Nakamura	Minami Chiba	(Hokkaido) Sapporo
Miku Nihira	Momoha Tabata	Sae Yamamoto	Mikoto Nakajima		(Hokkaido) Sapporo
Park You-been	Park Seo-jin	Yang Tae-i	Kim Su-jin		(South Korea) Chuncheon
Kotoka Segawa	Suzune Yasui	Yuna Sakuma	Aira Inada	Yumeka Mori	(Hokkaido) Sapporo
Kotone Suzuki (Fourth)	Moka Tanaka (Skip)	Minami Nakao	Akari Hashimoto	Hana Ikeda	(Hokkaido) Sapporo
Miyu Ueno	Yui Ueno	– (Note: Team Ueno played with three players.)	Asuka Kanai		(Nagano Prefecture) Karuizawa

=== Round robin standings ===
Final Round Robin Standings

Key
Teams to Playoffs

Pool A	W	L	W–L	PF	PA	DSC
(Nagano Prefecture) Miyu Ueno	3	1	1–0	28	19	33.8
(South Korea) Team Kim	3	1	0–1	23	20	49.7
(Hokkaido) Moka Tanaka	2	2	–	19	25	74.9
(Hokkaido) Kotoka Segawa	1	3	1–0	21	28	48.8
(South Korea) Park You-been	1	3	0–1	26	25	53.2

Pool B	W	L	W–L	PF	PA	DSC
(Hokkaido) Miku Nihira	4	0	–	16	8	37.5
(Nagano Prefecture) Ikue Kitazawa	2	2	1–1	24	17	27.2
(Hokkaido) Yuina Miura	2	2	1–1	14	17	39.4
(Hokkaido) Himari Ichiyama	2	2	1–1	12	24	82.5
(South Korea) Kang Bo-bae	0	4	–	0	0	199.6

=== Round robin results ===
All draw times are listed in Japan Standard Time (UTC+09:00).

==== Draw 2 ====
Thursday, August 27, 2:00 pm

Sheet A	1	2	3	4	5	6	7	8	Final
(Hokkaido) Yuina Miura 🔨	0	1	0	1	0	0	0	0	2
(Hokkaido) Miku Nihira	0	0	2	0	0	0	0	1	3

Sheet B	1	2	3	4	5	6	7	8	Final
(Hokkaido) Moka Tanaka	0	1	0	0	0	1	0	X	2
(South Korea) Park You-been 🔨	2	0	2	2	1	0	4	X	11

Sheet C	1	2	3	4	5	6	7	8	Final
(Hokkaido) Kotoka Segawa	0	0	2	1	0	1	0	X	4
(Nagano Prefecture) Miyu Ueno 🔨	2	1	0	0	2	0	4	X	9

Sheet D	1	2	3	4	5	6	7	8	Final
(Nagano Prefecture) Ikue Kitazawa 🔨	0	3	0	4	6	1	X	X	14
(Hokkaido) Himari Ichiyama	0	0	2	0	0	0	X	X	2

==== Draw 4 ====
Thursday, August 28, 9:00 am

Sheet A	1	2	3	4	5	6	7	8	Final
(Nagano Prefecture) Miyu Ueno	0	1	0	0	0	1	0	1	3
(Hokkaido) Moka Tanaka 🔨	0	0	1	1	1	0	2	0	5

Sheet B	1	2	3	4	5	6	7	8	Final
(Hokkaido) Miku Nihira	0	0	1	0	0	3	0	4	8
(Nagano Prefecture) Ikue Kitazawa 🔨	0	1	0	0	2	0	1	0	4

Sheet C	Final
(Hokkaido) Himari Ichiyama 🔨	W
(South Korea) Kang Bo-bae	L

Sheet D	1	2	3	4	5	6	7	8	Final
(South Korea) Team Kim	0	1	1	0	2	0	0	2	6
(Hokkaido) Kotoka Segawa 🔨	0	0	0	1	0	2	1	0	4

==== Draw 6 ====
Thursday, August 28, 4:00 pm

Sheet A	Final
(South Korea) Kang Bo-bae	L
(Nagano Prefecture) Ikue Kitazawa 🔨	W

Sheet B	1	2	3	4	5	6	7	8	Final
(Hokkaido) Himari Ichiyama	0	0	4	0	1	0	2	1	8
(Hokkaido) Yuina Miura 🔨	0	1	0	2	0	2	0	0	5

Sheet C	1	2	3	4	5	6	7	8	Final
(Hokkaido) Moka Tanaka	0	2	0	1	0	0	1	0	4
(South Korea) Team Kim 🔨	0	0	1	0	1	2	0	1	5

Sheet D	1	2	3	4	5	6	7	8	Final
(South Korea) Park You-been	0	2	0	3	0	0	1	X	6
(Nagano Prefecture) Miyu Ueno 🔨	2	0	1	0	2	3	0	X	8

==== Draw 8 ====
Friday, August 29, 9:00 am

Sheet A	1	2	3	4	5	6	7	8	Final
(South Korea) Park You-been 🔨	0	1	0	1	0	0	3	X	5
(Hokkaido) Kotoka Segawa	0	0	3	0	3	1	0	X	7

Sheet B	1	2	3	4	5	6	7	8	Final
(Nagano Prefecture) Miyu Ueno	2	2	0	0	1	0	3	X	8
(South Korea) Team Kim 🔨	0	0	2	0	0	2	0	X	4

Sheet C	1	2	3	4	5	6	7	8	9	Final
(Nagano Prefecture) Ikue Kitazawa 🔨	0	0	2	0	1	1	0	2	0	6
(Hokkaido) Yuina Miura	1	1	0	2	0	0	2	0	1	7

Sheet D	Final
(South Korea) Kang Bo-bae	L
(Hokkaido) Miku Nihira 🔨	W

==== Draw 10 ====
Friday, August 29, 4:00 pm

Sheet A	1	2	3	4	5	6	7	8	Final
(Hokkaido) Miku Nihira	0	1	1	0	2	0	1	X	5
(Hokkaido) Himari Ichiyama 🔨	0	0	0	1	0	1	0	X	2

Sheet B	1	2	3	4	5	6	7	8	Final
(Hokkaido) Kotoka Segawa	0	1	0	3	0	1	0	1	6
(Hokkaido) Moka Tanaka 🔨	2	0	2	0	3	0	1	0	8

Sheet C	1	2	3	4	5	6	7	8	Final
(South Korea) Team Kim	0	0	3	0	1	1	0	3	8
(South Korea) Park You-been 🔨	0	1	0	2	0	0	1	0	4

Sheet D	Final
(Hokkaido) Yuina Miura 🔨	W
(South Korea) Kang Bo-bae	L

=== Playoffs ===
Semifinals
A1	(Nagano Prefecture) Miyu Ueno	5
B2	(Nagano Prefecture) Ikue Kitazawa	3
B1	(Hokkaido) Miku Nihira	6
A2	(South Korea) Team Kim	3

Final
A1	(Nagano Prefecture) Miyu Ueno	8
B1	(Hokkaido) Miku Nihira	5
Third place game
B2	(Nagano Prefecture) Ikue Kitazawa	5
A2	(South Korea) Team Kim	4

==== Semifinals ====
Sunday, August 30, 9:00 am

Sheet A	1	2	3	4	5	6	7	8	Final
(Nagano Prefecture) Miyu Ueno 🔨	0	0	2	0	1	1	0	1	5
(Nagano Prefecture) Ikue Kitazawa	0	0	0	2	0	0	1	0	3

Sheet C	1	2	3	4	5	6	7	8	Final
(Hokkaido) Miku Nihira 🔨	0	0	0	3	0	1	0	2	6
(South Korea) Team Kim	1	0	0	0	1	0	1	0	3

==== Third place game ====
Sunday, August 30, 12:30 pm

Sheet B	1	2	3	4	5	6	7	8	Final
(Nagano Prefecture) Ikue Kitazawa 🔨	1	0	0	2	0	0	0	2	5
(South Korea) Team Kim	0	1	2	0	0	0	1	0	4

==== Final ====
Sunday, August 30, 4:00 pm

Sheet B	1	2	3	4	5	6	7	8	Final
(Nagano Prefecture) Miyu Ueno 🔨	0	2	0	4	0	1	0	1	8
(Hokkaido) Miku Nihira	0	0	3	0	1	0	1	0	5
