= 2022 Wakkanai Midori Challenge Cup =

- Host city: Wakkanai, Japan
- Arena: Wakkanai City Midori Sports Park
- Dates: August 18–21
- Men's winner: Team Maeda
- Curling club: Tokoro CC, Kitami
- Skip: Takumi Maeda
- Third: Uryu Kamikawa
- Second: Hiroki Maeda
- Lead: Asei Nakahara
- Coach: Nobuo Aoki
- Finalist: Yusuke Morozumi
- Women's winner: Team Yoshimura
- Curling club: Hokkaido Bank CS, Sapporo
- Skip: Sayaka Yoshimura
- Third: Kaho Onodera
- Second: Anna Ohmiya
- Lead: Mina Kobayashi
- Alternate: Yumie Funayama
- Finalist: Asuka Kanai

The 2022 Wakkanai Midori Challenge Cup was held from held from August 18 to 21 at the Wakkanai City Midori Sports Park in Wakkanai, Japan. It was the second tour event of the 2022–23 curling season and the second event of the Hokkaido Curling Tour. The total purse for the event is ¥ 1,720,000 on both the men's and women's sides.

== Men ==
=== Teams ===
The teams are listed as follows:

Skip	Third	Second	Lead	Alternate	Locale
Tetsuro Shimizu (Fourth)	Haruto Ouchi	Shinya Abe (Skip)	Minori Suzuki	Sota Tsuruga	Sapporo
Kohsuke Hirata	Shingo Usui	Ryota Meguro	Yoshiya Miura	Kosuke Aita	Kitami
Koto Inaba (Fourth)	Toshiya Iida (Skip)	Yuta Fuse	Kento Nishida		Wakkanai
Juon Ishimura	Sota Kon	Youn Ishimura	Shunaki Kudo		Aomori
Takumi Maeda	Uryu Kamikawa	Hiroki Maeda	Asei Nakahara		Kitami
Yusuke Morozumi	Yuta Matsumura	Ryotaro Shukuya	Kosuke Morozumi	Masaki Iwai	Karuizawa
Kotaro Noguchi	Yuto Kamada	Hiroshi Kato	Yuuki Yoshimura	Hayato Fujimura	Sendai
Go Aoki (Fourth)	Hayato Sato (Skip)	Kouki Ogiwara	Kazushi Nino	Ayato Sasaki	Sapporo

=== Round robin standings ===
Final Round Robin Standings

Key
Teams to Playoffs

Pool A	W	L	PF	PA	DSC
Yusuke Morozumi	3	0	28	9	42.50
Juon Ishimura	2	1	19	21	24.84
Hayato Sato	1	2	21	17	24.76
Toshiya Iida	0	3	9	30	65.34

Pool B	W	L	PF	PA	DSC
Takumi Maeda	3	0	23	15	12.38
Kotaro Noguchi	2	1	20	20	78.48
Kohsuke Hirata	1	2	19	20	15.18
Shinya Abe	0	3	16	22	29.70

=== Round robin results ===
All draw times are listed in Japan Standard Time (UTC+09:00).

==== Draw 1 ====
Thursday, August 18, 10:00 am

Sheet A	1	2	3	4	5	6	7	8	Final
Toshiya Iida	0	1	0	1	0	1	X	X	3
Hayato Sato 🔨	6	0	6	0	1	0	X	X	13

Sheet B	1	2	3	4	5	6	7	8	Final
Juon Ishimura 🔨	0	2	0	0	2	0	0	X	4
Yusuke Morozumi	1	0	4	3	0	2	2	X	12

Sheet C	1	2	3	4	5	6	7	8	Final
Shinya Abe 🔨	2	0	1	0	1	0	0	2	6
Kotaro Noguchi	0	1	0	1	0	3	3	0	8

Sheet D	1	2	3	4	5	6	7	8	Final
Takumi Maeda	0	2	0	3	1	0	0	1	7
Kohsuke Hirata 🔨	2	0	1	0	0	2	1	0	6

==== Draw 3 ====
Friday, August 19, 9:00 am

Sheet A	1	2	3	4	5	6	7	8	Final
Kotaro Noguchi	0	1	0	0	1	0	2	X	4
Takumi Maeda 🔨	2	0	0	1	0	4	0	X	7

Sheet B	1	2	3	4	5	6	7	8	9	Final
Shinya Abe	0	1	0	1	0	1	0	2	0	5
Kohsuke Hirata 🔨	2	0	1	0	1	0	1	0	1	6

Sheet C	1	2	3	4	5	6	7	8	Final
Hayato Sato 🔨	0	0	1	0	0	4	0	0	5
Juon Ishimura	1	2	0	0	1	0	2	1	7

Sheet D	1	2	3	4	5	6	7	8	Final
Toshiya Iida	0	1	0	0	1	0	X	X	2
Yusuke Morozumi 🔨	3	0	2	3	0	1	X	X	9

==== Draw 5 ====
Friday, August 19, 3:40 pm

Sheet A	1	2	3	4	5	6	7	8	Final
Juon Ishimura	0	1	0	2	0	3	2	X	8
Toshiya Iida 🔨	2	0	0	0	2	0	0	X	4

Sheet B	1	2	3	4	5	6	7	8	Final
Takumi Maeda 🔨	2	0	0	4	0	1	2	X	9
Shinya Abe	0	1	1	0	3	0	0	X	5

Sheet C	1	2	3	4	5	6	7	8	Final
Yusuke Morozumi 🔨	2	0	2	2	0	1	0	X	7
Hayato Sato	0	2	0	0	1	0	0	X	3

Sheet D	1	2	3	4	5	6	7	8	Final
Kohsuke Hirata 🔨	0	2	2	0	0	1	0	2	7
Kotaro Noguchi	4	0	0	2	1	0	1	0	8

=== Playoffs ===
Semifinals
A1	Yusuke Morozumi	7
B2	Kotaro Noguchi	2
B1	Takumi Maeda	7
A2	Juon Ishimura	6

Final
A1	Yusuke Morozumi	4
B1	Takumi Maeda	6
Third place game
B2	Kotaro Noguchi	6
A2	Juon Ishimura	5

==== Semifinals ====
Saturday, August 20, 12:20 pm

Sheet B	1	2	3	4	5	6	7	8	Final
Yusuke Morozumi	1	1	0	2	2	0	1	X	7
Kotaro Noguchi 🔨	0	0	1	0	0	1	0	X	2

Sheet D	1	2	3	4	5	6	7	8	Final
Takumi Maeda	0	0	2	0	2	0	2	1	7
Juon Ishimura 🔨	2	1	0	2	0	1	0	0	6

==== Third place game ====
Sunday, August 21, 9:30 am

Sheet A	1	2	3	4	5	6	7	8	9	Final
Kotaro Noguchi	0	1	0	1	0	1	0	2	1	6
Juon Ishimura 🔨	1	0	2	0	1	0	1	0	0	5

==== Final ====
Sunday, August 21, 9:30 am

Sheet C	1	2	3	4	5	6	7	8	Final
Yusuke Morozumi 🔨	1	0	0	1	2	0	0	0	4
Takumi Maeda	0	2	1	0	0	0	0	3	6

== Women ==
=== Teams ===
The teams are listed as follows:

Skip	Third	Second	Lead	Alternate	Locale
Asuka Kanai	Ami Enami	Junko Nishimuro	Mone Ryokawa		Karuizawa
Ikue Kitazawa	Seina Nakajima	Minori Suzuki	Hasumi Ishigooka	Chiaki Matsumura	Nagano
Mayu Minami	Kana Ogawa	Momo Kaneta	Nao Kyoto		Sapporo
Honoka Sasaki	Mari Motohashi	Miki Hayashi	Ayuna Aoki	Mayumi Saito	Kitami
Momoha Tabata	Miku Nihira	Mikoto Nakajima	Ayami Ito		Sapporo
Miyu Ueno (Fourth)	Sae Yamamoto (Skip)	Suzune Yasui	Mizuki Hara	Momoka Iwase	Sapporo
Sayaka Yoshimura	Kaho Onodera	Anna Ohmiya	Mina Kobayashi (Note: Alternate Mina Kobayashi played lead throughout the tournament.)	Yumie Funayama	Sapporo

=== Round robin standings ===
Final Round Robin Standings

Key
Teams to Playoffs

Pool A	W	L	W–L	PF	PA	DSC
Sayaka Yoshimura	2	0	–	16	9	38.04
Asuka Kanai	1	1	–	15	14	17.52
Momoha Tabata	0	2	–	6	14	77.64

Pool B	W	L	W–L	PF	PA	DSC
Ikue Kitazawa	2	1	1–0	19	15	41.14
Honoka Sasaki	2	1	0–1	18	12	69.36
Mayu Minami	1	2	1–0	13	18	39.60
Sae Yamamoto	1	2	0–1	13	18	69.64

=== Round robin results ===
All draw times are listed in Japan Standard Time (UTC+09:00).

==== Draw 2 ====
Thursday, August 18, 1:20 pm

Sheet B	1	2	3	4	5	6	7	8	Final
Momoha Tabata	0	0	2	0	0	2	0	0	4
Asuka Kanai 🔨	1	1	0	1	2	0	1	2	8

Sheet C	1	2	3	4	5	6	7	8	Final
Sae Yamamoto	0	0	0	2	0	3	0	1	6
Ikue Kitazawa 🔨	0	1	1	0	1	0	2	0	5

Sheet D	1	2	3	4	5	6	7	8	Final
Honoka Sasaki	0	0	1	2	0	2	0	1	6
Mayu Minami 🔨	0	1	0	0	1	0	1	0	3

==== Draw 4 ====
Friday, August 19, 12:20 pm

Sheet A	1	2	3	4	5	6	7	8	Final
Ikue Kitazawa	0	0	2	0	2	0	1	2	7
Honoka Sasaki 🔨	1	1	0	1	0	2	0	0	5

Sheet B	1	2	3	4	5	6	7	8	Final
Sae Yamamoto	0	0	2	0	1	1	1	0	5
Mayu Minami 🔨	1	2	0	2	0	0	0	1	6

Sheet D	1	2	3	4	5	6	7	8	9	Final
Sayaka Yoshimura	1	0	2	0	3	0	1	0	3	10
Asuka Kanai 🔨	0	1	0	2	0	1	0	3	0	7

==== Draw 6 ====
Saturday, August 20, 9:00 am

Sheet A	1	2	3	4	5	6	7	8	Final
Momoha Tabata	0	0	1	0	1	0	0	X	2
Sayaka Yoshimura 🔨	0	2	0	1	0	1	2	X	6

Sheet B	1	2	3	4	5	6	7	8	Final
Honoka Sasaki 🔨	2	0	1	1	0	3	X	X	7
Sae Yamamoto	0	1	0	0	1	0	X	X	2

Sheet D	1	2	3	4	5	6	7	8	Final
Mayu Minami 🔨	0	0	2	0	1	0	1	X	4
Ikue Kitazawa	1	2	0	1	0	3	0	X	7

=== Playoffs ===
Semifinals
A1	Sayaka Yoshimura	7
B2	Honoka Sasaki	2
B1	Ikue Kitazawa	2
A2	Asuka Kanai	4

Final
A1	Sayaka Yoshimura	9
A2	Asuka Kanai	2
Third place game
B2	Honoka Sasaki	6
B1	Ikue Kitazawa	5

==== Semifinals ====
Saturday, August 20, 5:00 pm

Sheet A	1	2	3	4	5	6	7	8	Final
Sayaka Yoshimura 🔨	0	1	0	2	1	0	3	X	7
Honoka Sasaki	0	0	1	0	0	1	0	X	2

Sheet C	1	2	3	4	5	6	7	8	Final
Ikue Kitazawa	0	0	1	0	0	1	0	0	2
Asuka Kanai 🔨	1	0	0	1	0	0	1	1	4

==== Third place game ====
Sunday, August 21, 2:00 pm

Sheet D	1	2	3	4	5	6	7	8	Final
Honoka Sasaki 🔨	0	1	0	2	0	1	0	2	6
Ikue Kitazawa	2	0	1	0	1	0	1	0	5

==== Final ====
Sunday, August 21, 2:00 pm

Sheet B	1	2	3	4	5	6	7	8	Final
Sayaka Yoshimura 🔨	2	3	2	0	0	0	2	X	9
Asuka Kanai	0	0	0	1	0	1	0	X	2
