= 2025 Wakkanai Midori Challenge Cup =

- Host city: Wakkanai, Japan
- Arena: Wakkanai City Midori Sports Park
- Dates: July 31 – August 3
- Men's winner: (Hokkaido) Team Maeda
- Curling club: Tokoro CC, Kitami
- Skip: Takumi Maeda
- Second: Hiroki Maeda
- Lead: Uryu Kamikawa
- Coach: Ryoji Onodera & Mari Motohashi
- Finalist: (Hokkaido) Kohsuke Hirata
- Women's winner: (Hokkaido) Satsuki Fujisawa
- Curling club: Tokoro CC, Kitami
- Skip: Satsuki Fujisawa
- Third: Chinami Yoshida
- Second: Yumi Suzuki
- Lead: Yurika Yoshida
- Coach: J. D. Lind
- Finalist: (Nagano Prefecture) Miyu Ueno

The 2025 Wakkanai Midori Challenge Cup was held from July 31 to August 3 at the Wakkanai City Midori Sports Park in Wakkanai, Japan. It was the second tour event of the 2025–26 curling season and the first event of the Hokkaido Curling Tour. The total purse for the event was ¥ 1,500,000 on both the men's and women's sides.

== Men ==
=== Teams ===
The teams are listed as follows:

| Skip | Third | Second | Lead | Alternate | Locale |
|---|---|---|---|---|---|
| Tetsuro Shimizu (Fourth) | Shinya Abe (Skip) | Hayato Sato | Haruto Ouchi | Sota Tsuruga | (Hokkaido) Sapporo |
| Kaito Fujii | Miki Yamamoto | Konosuke Takahashi | Shunsuke Kanakawa | Ryo Ogiwara | (Nagano Prefecture) Karuizawa |
| Yuta Fuse | Shogo Ishidate | Koto Inaba | Kento Nishida | | (Hokkaido) Wakkanai |
| Kohsuke Hirata | Shingo Usui | Koei Sato | Ryota Meguro | Hirofumi Kobayashi | (Hokkaido) Kitami |
| Kim Hak-jun | Moon Si-woo | Park Jin-hwan | Park Jong-hyeon | Kim Myeong-jun | (South Korea) Uiseong |
| Takumi Maeda | – (Note: Team Maeda played with three players.) | Hiroki Maeda | Uryu Kamikawa | | (Hokkaido) Tokoro |
| Takuma Makanae | Kantaro Kawano | Masaki Kudo | Taiki Nihira | Keisuke Akutagawa | (Hokkaido) Sapporo |
| Shunta Kobayashi (Note: Shunta Kobayashi skipped Team Ogiwara.) | Kouki Ogiwara | Taiki Kudo | Yuto Abe | Hinata Michitani | (Hokkaido) Sapporo |
| P. N. Raju | Girithar Anthay Suthakaran | Sudheer Reddy | Kishan Vasant | | (India) Hyderabad |
| Riku Yanagisawa (Fourth) | Tsuyoshi Yamaguchi (Skip) (Note: Tsuyoshi Yamaguchi skipped Team Yanagisawa.) | Takeru Yamamoto | Satoshi Koizumi | | (Nagano Prefecture) Karuizawa |

=== Round robin standings ===
Final Round Robin Standings

Key
| Teams to Playoffs |

| Pool A | W | L | W–L | PF | PA | DSC |
|---|---|---|---|---|---|---|
| (Nagano Prefecture) Team Yanagisawa | 3 | 1 | 1–0 | 27 | 13 | 32.90 |
| (Hokkaido) Takumi Maeda | 3 | 1 | 0–1 | 28 | 15 | 44.60 |
| (Hokkaido) Team Ogiwara | 2 | 2 | – | 20 | 20 | 69.50 |
| (Hokkaido) Yuta Fuse | 1 | 3 | 1–0 | 17 | 29 | 46.20 |
| (India) P. N. Raju | 1 | 3 | 0–1 | 11 | 26 | 120.60 |

| Pool B | W | L | W–L | PF | PA | DSC |
|---|---|---|---|---|---|---|
| (Hokkaido) Shinya Abe | 4 | 0 | – | 27 | 14 | 42.70 |
| (Hokkaido) Kohsuke Hirata | 3 | 1 | – | 28 | 17 | 26.90 |
| (Nagano Prefecture) Kaito Fujii | 2 | 2 | – | 22 | 16 | 33.50 |
| (Hokkaido) Takuma Makanae | 1 | 3 | – | 17 | 24 | 29.30 |
| (South Korea) Kim Hak-jun | 0 | 4 | – | 11 | 34 | 23.30 |

=== Round robin results ===
All draw times are listed in Japan Standard Time (UTC+09:00).

==== Draw 1 ====
Thursday, July 31, 10:30 am

| Sheet A | 1 | 2 | 3 | 4 | 5 | 6 | 7 | 8 | Final |
| (Nagano Prefecture) Kaito Fujii | 0 | 2 | 0 | 0 | 4 | 1 | 1 | X | 8 |
| (Hokkaido) Takuma Makanae 🔨 | 2 | 0 | 1 | 0 | 0 | 0 | 0 | X | 3 |

| Sheet B | 1 | 2 | 3 | 4 | 5 | 6 | 7 | 8 | Final |
| (Hokkaido) Team Ogiwara | 1 | 0 | 0 | 2 | 0 | 0 | 2 | X | 5 |
| (Hokkaido) Takumi Maeda 🔨 | 0 | 2 | 1 | 0 | 3 | 1 | 0 | X | 7 |

| Sheet C | 1 | 2 | 3 | 4 | 5 | 6 | 7 | 8 | Final |
| (India) P. N. Raju | 0 | 0 | 1 | 0 | 0 | 3 | 0 | 0 | 4 |
| (Hokkaido) Yuta Fuse 🔨 | 2 | 1 | 0 | 1 | 0 | 0 | 2 | 1 | 7 |

| Sheet D | 1 | 2 | 3 | 4 | 5 | 6 | 7 | 8 | Final |
| (South Korea) Kim Hak-jun 🔨 | 1 | 0 | 1 | 0 | 0 | 0 | X | X | 2 |
| (Hokkaido) Shinya Abe | 0 | 2 | 0 | 3 | 1 | 4 | X | X | 10 |

==== Draw 3 ====
Thursday, July 31, 6:00 pm

| Sheet A | 1 | 2 | 3 | 4 | 5 | 6 | 7 | 8 | Final |
| (Hokkaido) Yuta Fuse 🔨 | 0 | 3 | 0 | 1 | 0 | 0 | 1 | 0 | 5 |
| (Hokkaido) Team Ogiwara | 1 | 0 | 2 | 0 | 3 | 0 | 0 | 1 | 7 |

| Sheet B | 1 | 2 | 3 | 4 | 5 | 6 | 7 | 8 | Final |
| (Hokkaido) Takuma Makanae | 0 | 0 | 2 | 0 | 2 | 2 | 1 | X | 7 |
| (South Korea) Kim Hak-jun 🔨 | 1 | 0 | 0 | 2 | 0 | 0 | 0 | X | 3 |

| Sheet C | 1 | 2 | 3 | 4 | 5 | 6 | 7 | 8 | Final |
| (Hokkaido) Shinya Abe | 0 | 0 | 2 | 0 | 0 | 2 | 0 | 1 | 5 |
| (Hokkaido) Kohsuke Hirata 🔨 | 0 | 2 | 0 | 0 | 1 | 0 | 1 | 0 | 4 |

| Sheet D | 1 | 2 | 3 | 4 | 5 | 6 | 7 | 8 | Final |
| (Nagano Prefecture) Team Yanagisawa | 1 | 0 | 3 | 0 | 3 | 1 | X | X | 8 |
| (India) P. N. Raju 🔨 | 0 | 1 | 0 | 1 | 0 | 0 | X | X | 2 |

==== Draw 5 ====
Friday, August 1, 12:30 pm

| Sheet A | 1 | 2 | 3 | 4 | 5 | 6 | 7 | 8 | Final |
| (Hokkaido) Kohsuke Hirata 🔨 | 3 | 0 | 0 | 6 | 0 | 3 | X | X | 12 |
| (South Korea) Kim Hak-jun | 0 | 1 | 1 | 0 | 2 | 0 | X | X | 4 |

| Sheet B | 1 | 2 | 3 | 4 | 5 | 6 | 7 | 8 | Final |
| (Hokkaido) Shinya Abe | 0 | 1 | 2 | 0 | 3 | 0 | 0 | 0 | 6 |
| (Nagano Prefecture) Kaito Fujii 🔨 | 0 | 0 | 0 | 2 | 0 | 2 | 0 | 1 | 5 |

| Sheet C | 1 | 2 | 3 | 4 | 5 | 6 | 7 | 8 | 9 | Final |
| (Hokkaido) Team Ogiwara 🔨 | 2 | 0 | 0 | 1 | 0 | 1 | 0 | 0 | 1 | 5 |
| (Nagano Prefecture) Team Yanagisawa | 0 | 2 | 0 | 0 | 0 | 0 | 0 | 2 | 0 | 4 |

| Sheet D | 1 | 2 | 3 | 4 | 5 | 6 | 7 | 8 | Final |
| (Hokkaido) Takumi Maeda | 0 | 3 | 0 | 0 | 2 | 0 | 4 | X | 9 |
| (Hokkaido) Yuta Fuse 🔨 | 1 | 0 | 1 | 0 | 0 | 1 | 0 | X | 3 |

==== Draw 7 ====
Friday, August 1, 7:30 pm

| Sheet A | 1 | 2 | 3 | 4 | 5 | 6 | 7 | 8 | Final |
| (Hokkaido) Takumi Maeda 🔨 | 0 | 2 | 1 | 2 | 0 | 2 | 1 | X | 8 |
| (India) P. N. Raju | 0 | 0 | 0 | 0 | 1 | 0 | 0 | X | 1 |

| Sheet B | 1 | 2 | 3 | 4 | 5 | 6 | 7 | 8 | Final |
| (Hokkaido) Yuta Fuse | 0 | 0 | 1 | 0 | 0 | 1 | 0 | X | 2 |
| (Nagano Prefecture) Team Yanagisawa 🔨 | 1 | 1 | 0 | 2 | 1 | 0 | 4 | X | 9 |

| Sheet C | 1 | 2 | 3 | 4 | 5 | 6 | 7 | 8 | Final |
| (South Korea) Kim Hak-jun | 1 | 0 | 0 | 0 | 0 | 1 | 0 | X | 2 |
| (Nagano Prefecture) Kaito Fujii 🔨 | 0 | 0 | 1 | 2 | 1 | 0 | 1 | X | 5 |

| Sheet D | 1 | 2 | 3 | 4 | 5 | 6 | 7 | 8 | Final |
| (Hokkaido) Kohsuke Hirata 🔨 | 1 | 0 | 2 | 0 | 3 | 0 | 1 | X | 7 |
| (Hokkaido) Takuma Makanae | 0 | 2 | 0 | 1 | 0 | 1 | 0 | X | 4 |

==== Draw 9 ====
Saturday, August 2, 12:30 pm

| Sheet A | 1 | 2 | 3 | 4 | 5 | 6 | 7 | 8 | Final |
| (Hokkaido) Takuma Makanae 🔨 | 0 | 0 | 0 | 0 | 2 | 1 | 0 | X | 3 |
| (Hokkaido) Shinya Abe | 3 | 1 | 1 | 0 | 0 | 0 | 1 | X | 6 |

| Sheet B | 1 | 2 | 3 | 4 | 5 | 6 | 7 | 8 | Final |
| (Nagano Prefecture) Kaito Fujii 🔨 | 0 | 1 | 0 | 2 | 1 | 0 | 0 | 0 | 4 |
| (Hokkaido) Kohsuke Hirata | 0 | 0 | 1 | 0 | 0 | 1 | 1 | 2 | 5 |

| Sheet C | 1 | 2 | 3 | 4 | 5 | 6 | 7 | 8 | Final |
| (Nagano Prefecture) Team Yanagisawa 🔨 | 2 | 0 | 0 | 0 | 0 | 2 | 1 | 1 | 6 |
| (Hokkaido) Takumi Maeda | 0 | 1 | 0 | 3 | 0 | 0 | 0 | 0 | 4 |

| Sheet D | 1 | 2 | 3 | 4 | 5 | 6 | 7 | 8 | Final |
| (India) P. N. Raju 🔨 | 0 | 2 | 0 | 0 | 0 | 1 | 0 | 1 | 4 |
| (Hokkaido) Team Ogiwara | 0 | 0 | 0 | 1 | 0 | 0 | 2 | 0 | 3 |

=== Playoffs ===
Semifinals
A1 | (Nagano Prefecture) Team Yanagisawa | 4
B2 | (Hokkaido) Kohsuke Hirata | 6
B1 | (Hokkaido) Shinya Abe | 3
A2 | (Hokkaido) Takumi Maeda | 4

Final
B2 | (Hokkaido) Kohsuke Hirata | 1
A2 | (Hokkaido) Takumi Maeda | 5
Third place game
A1 | (Nagano Prefecture) Team Yanagisawa | 8
B1 | (Hokkaido) Shinya Abe | 3

==== Semifinals ====
Sunday, August 3, 9:00 am

| Sheet B | 1 | 2 | 3 | 4 | 5 | 6 | 7 | 8 | Final |
| (Nagano Prefecture) Team Yanagisawa | 0 | 1 | 0 | 0 | 1 | 0 | 2 | 0 | 4 |
| (Hokkaido) Kohsuke Hirata 🔨 | 1 | 0 | 1 | 1 | 0 | 2 | 0 | 1 | 6 |

| Sheet D | 1 | 2 | 3 | 4 | 5 | 6 | 7 | 8 | Final |
| (Hokkaido) Shinya Abe | 0 | 1 | 0 | 0 | 0 | 1 | 1 | 0 | 3 |
| (Hokkaido) Takumi Maeda 🔨 | 0 | 0 | 1 | 0 | 0 | 0 | 0 | 3 | 4 |

==== Third place game ====
Sunday, August 3, 12:30 pm

| Sheet C | 1 | 2 | 3 | 4 | 5 | 6 | 7 | 8 | Final |
| (Nagano Prefecture) Team Yanagisawa 🔨 | 0 | 4 | 1 | 0 | 2 | 0 | 1 | X | 8 |
| (Hokkaido) Shinya Abe | 1 | 0 | 0 | 1 | 0 | 1 | 0 | X | 3 |

==== Final ====
Sunday, August 3, 4:00 pm

| Sheet C | 1 | 2 | 3 | 4 | 5 | 6 | 7 | 8 | Final |
| (Hokkaido) Kohsuke Hirata | 0 | 0 | 0 | 0 | 1 | 0 | 0 | X | 1 |
| (Hokkaido) Takumi Maeda 🔨 | 0 | 0 | 1 | 1 | 0 | 1 | 2 | X | 5 |

== Women ==
=== Teams ===
The teams are listed as follows:

| Skip | Third | Second | Lead | Alternate | Locale |
|---|---|---|---|---|---|
| Satsuki Fujisawa | Chinami Yoshida | Yumi Suzuki | Yurika Yoshida | | (Hokkaido) Kitami |
| Kang Bo-bae | Shim Yu-jeong | Kim Min-seo | Kim Ji-soo | Lee Bo-young | (South Korea) Jeonbuk |
| Ikue Kitazawa | Seina Nakajima | Minori Suzuki | Hasumi Ishigooka | Ami Enami | (Nagano Prefecture) Nagano |
| Yuina Miura | Kohane Tsuruga | Rin Suzuki | Hana Ikeda | Aone Nakamura | (Hokkaido) Sapporo |
| Momoha Tabata (Fourth) | Miku Nihira (Skip) | Sae Yamamoto | Mikoto Nakajima | | (Hokkaido) Sapporo |
| Honoka Sasaki | Yako Matsuzawa | Hazuki Kimura | Kaho Tamekuni | | (Hokkaido) Kitami |
| Misaki Tanaka | Miori Nakamura | Hiyori Ichinohe | Yuna Harada | | (Aomori Prefecture) Aomori |
| Miyu Ueno | Yui Ueno | – (Note: Team Ueno played with three players.) | Asuka Kanai | | (Nagano Prefecture) Karuizawa |
| Hinako Sonobe (Fourth) | Aoi Watanabe (Skip) | Mao Ishigaki | Mizuki Hara | Yui Ozeki | Tokyo |
| Sayaka Yoshimura | Kaho Onodera | Yuna Kotani | Anna Ohmiya | Mina Kobayashi | (Hokkaido) Sapporo |

=== Round robin standings ===
Final Round Robin Standings

Key
| Teams to Playoffs |

| Pool A | W | L | W–L | PF | PA | DSC |
|---|---|---|---|---|---|---|
| (Hokkaido) Satsuki Fujisawa | 4 | 0 | – | 23 | 13 | 35.80 |
| (Nagano Prefecture) Miyu Ueno | 3 | 1 | – | 20 | 19 | 49.20 |
| (Hokkaido) Miku Nihira | 2 | 2 | – | 22 | 20 | 43.90 |
| (Hokkaido) Yuina Miura | 1 | 3 | – | 18 | 23 | 44.70 |
| (Tokyo) Aoi Watanabe | 0 | 4 | – | 18 | 26 | 74.00 |

| Pool B | W | L | W–L | PF | PA | DSC |
|---|---|---|---|---|---|---|
| (South Korea) Kang Bo-bae | 4 | 0 | – | 31 | 10 | 16.40 |
| (Nagano Prefecture) Ikue Kitazawa | 2 | 2 | 1–0 | 23 | 19 | 42.80 |
| (Hokkaido) Sayaka Yoshimura | 2 | 2 | 0–1 | 18 | 19 | 42.80 |
| (Aomori Prefecture) Misaki Tanaka | 1 | 3 | 1–0 | 17 | 25 | 83.60 |
| (Hokkaido) Honoka Sasaki | 1 | 3 | 0–1 | 11 | 27 | 48.90 |

=== Round robin results ===
All draw times are listed in Japan Standard Time (UTC+09:00).

==== Draw 2 ====
Thursday, July 31, 2:00 pm

| Sheet A | 1 | 2 | 3 | 4 | 5 | 6 | 7 | 8 | Final |
| (Nagano Prefecture) Ikue Kitazawa | 1 | 0 | 2 | 2 | 4 | 2 | X | X | 11 |
| (Aomori Prefecture) Misaki Tanaka 🔨 | 0 | 1 | 0 | 0 | 0 | 0 | X | X | 1 |

| Sheet B | 1 | 2 | 3 | 4 | 5 | 6 | 7 | 8 | Final |
| (Hokkaido) Satsuki Fujisawa | 0 | 2 | 0 | 1 | 0 | 1 | 1 | X | 5 |
| (Hokkaido) Miku Nihira 🔨 | 0 | 0 | 2 | 0 | 1 | 0 | 0 | X | 3 |

| Sheet C | 1 | 2 | 3 | 4 | 5 | 6 | 7 | 8 | Final |
| (Hokkaido) Yuina Miura | 0 | 0 | 0 | 3 | 0 | 1 | 0 | 0 | 4 |
| (Nagano Prefecture) Miyu Ueno 🔨 | 0 | 0 | 2 | 0 | 3 | 0 | 0 | 2 | 7 |

| Sheet D | 1 | 2 | 3 | 4 | 5 | 6 | 7 | 8 | Final |
| (Hokkaido) Sayaka Yoshimura | 0 | 0 | 0 | 0 | 1 | 0 | X | X | 1 |
| (South Korea) Kang Bo-bae 🔨 | 0 | 1 | 1 | 3 | 0 | 3 | X | X | 8 |

==== Draw 4 ====
Friday, August 1, 9:00 am

| Sheet A | 1 | 2 | 3 | 4 | 5 | 6 | 7 | 8 | Final |
| (Nagano Prefecture) Miyu Ueno 🔨 | 0 | 0 | 0 | 0 | 0 | 1 | 0 | X | 1 |
| (Hokkaido) Satsuki Fujisawa | 0 | 1 | 1 | 1 | 1 | 0 | 2 | X | 6 |

| Sheet B | 1 | 2 | 3 | 4 | 5 | 6 | 7 | 8 | Final |
| (Aomori Prefecture) Misaki Tanaka | 0 | 0 | 1 | 0 | 2 | 0 | 0 | X | 3 |
| (Hokkaido) Sayaka Yoshimura 🔨 | 0 | 2 | 0 | 2 | 0 | 1 | 1 | X | 6 |

| Sheet C | 1 | 2 | 3 | 4 | 5 | 6 | 7 | 8 | Final |
| (South Korea) Kang Bo-bae | 2 | 2 | 1 | 0 | 2 | 1 | X | X | 8 |
| (Hokkaido) Honoka Sasaki 🔨 | 0 | 0 | 0 | 2 | 0 | 0 | X | X | 2 |

| Sheet D | 1 | 2 | 3 | 4 | 5 | 6 | 7 | 8 | Final |
| (Tokyo) Aoi Watanabe | 0 | 0 | 2 | 0 | 0 | 0 | 1 | X | 3 |
| (Hokkaido) Yuina Miura 🔨 | 0 | 2 | 0 | 1 | 1 | 2 | 0 | X | 6 |

==== Draw 6 ====
Friday, August 1, 4:00 pm

| Sheet A | 1 | 2 | 3 | 4 | 5 | 6 | 7 | 8 | Final |
| (Hokkaido) Honoka Sasaki | 0 | 0 | 1 | 0 | 1 | 0 | 0 | X | 2 |
| (Hokkaido) Sayaka Yoshimura 🔨 | 1 | 1 | 0 | 2 | 0 | 2 | 1 | X | 7 |

| Sheet B | 1 | 2 | 3 | 4 | 5 | 6 | 7 | 8 | Final |
| (South Korea) Kang Bo-bae 🔨 | 0 | 2 | 0 | 1 | 1 | 0 | 4 | X | 8 |
| (Nagano Prefecture) Ikue Kitazawa | 0 | 0 | 1 | 0 | 0 | 1 | 0 | X | 2 |

| Sheet C | 1 | 2 | 3 | 4 | 5 | 6 | 7 | 8 | Final |
| (Hokkaido) Satsuki Fujisawa 🔨 | 2 | 3 | 0 | 0 | 0 | 0 | 1 | X | 6 |
| (Tokyo) Aoi Watanabe | 0 | 0 | 1 | 1 | 1 | 1 | 0 | X | 4 |

| Sheet D | 1 | 2 | 3 | 4 | 5 | 6 | 7 | 8 | Final |
| (Hokkaido) Miku Nihira | 0 | 0 | 2 | 0 | 1 | 1 | 0 | 0 | 4 |
| (Nagano Prefecture) Miyu Ueno 🔨 | 0 | 1 | 0 | 2 | 0 | 0 | 2 | 1 | 6 |

==== Draw 8 ====
Saturday, August 2, 9:00 am

| Sheet A | 1 | 2 | 3 | 4 | 5 | 6 | 7 | 8 | Final |
| (Hokkaido) Miku Nihira | 0 | 1 | 0 | 2 | 0 | 3 | 1 | X | 7 |
| (Hokkaido) Yuina Miura 🔨 | 0 | 0 | 1 | 0 | 2 | 0 | 0 | X | 3 |

| Sheet B | 1 | 2 | 3 | 4 | 5 | 6 | 7 | 8 | Final |
| (Nagano Prefecture) Miyu Ueno | 0 | 0 | 2 | 2 | 0 | 1 | 0 | 1 | 6 |
| (Tokyo) Aoi Watanabe 🔨 | 0 | 2 | 0 | 0 | 2 | 0 | 1 | 0 | 5 |

| Sheet C | 1 | 2 | 3 | 4 | 5 | 6 | 7 | 8 | Final |
| (Hokkaido) Sayaka Yoshimura | 1 | 1 | 0 | 1 | 0 | 1 | 0 | 0 | 4 |
| (Nagano Prefecture) Ikue Kitazawa 🔨 | 0 | 0 | 1 | 0 | 2 | 0 | 2 | 1 | 6 |

| Sheet D | 1 | 2 | 3 | 4 | 5 | 6 | 7 | 8 | Final |
| (Hokkaido) Honoka Sasaki 🔨 | 0 | 0 | 0 | 0 | 1 | 0 | X | X | 1 |
| (Aomori Prefecture) Misaki Tanaka | 0 | 4 | 1 | 2 | 0 | 1 | X | X | 8 |

==== Draw 10 ====
Saturday, August 2, 4:00 pm

| Sheet A | 1 | 2 | 3 | 4 | 5 | 6 | 7 | 8 | Final |
| (Aomori Prefecture) Misaki Tanaka | 0 | 0 | 2 | 0 | 0 | 3 | 0 | X | 5 |
| (South Korea) Kang Bo-bae 🔨 | 1 | 1 | 0 | 1 | 1 | 0 | 3 | X | 7 |

| Sheet B | 1 | 2 | 3 | 4 | 5 | 6 | 7 | 8 | Final |
| (Hokkaido) Yuina Miura | 0 | 0 | 2 | 0 | 2 | 0 | 0 | 1 | 5 |
| (Hokkaido) Satsuki Fujisawa 🔨 | 2 | 1 | 0 | 2 | 0 | 1 | 0 | 0 | 6 |

| Sheet C | 1 | 2 | 3 | 4 | 5 | 6 | 7 | 8 | Final |
| (Tokyo) Aoi Watanabe | 0 | 1 | 3 | 0 | 2 | 0 | 0 | 0 | 6 |
| (Hokkaido) Miku Nihira 🔨 | 1 | 0 | 0 | 2 | 0 | 1 | 2 | 2 | 8 |

| Sheet D | 1 | 2 | 3 | 4 | 5 | 6 | 7 | 8 | 9 | Final |
| (Nagano Prefecture) Ikue Kitazawa 🔨 | 0 | 1 | 0 | 1 | 1 | 1 | 0 | 0 | 0 | 4 |
| (Hokkaido) Honoka Sasaki | 0 | 0 | 1 | 0 | 0 | 0 | 2 | 1 | 2 | 6 |

=== Playoffs ===
Semifinals
A1 | (Hokkaido) Satsuki Fujisawa | 8
B2 | (Nagano Prefecture) Ikue Kitazawa | 3
B1 | (South Korea) Kang Bo-bae | 4
A2 | (Nagano Prefecture) Miyu Ueno | 6

Final
A1 | (Hokkaido) Satsuki Fujisawa | 8
A2 | (Nagano Prefecture) Miyu Ueno | 3
Third place game
B2 | (Nagano Prefecture) Ikue Kitazawa | 4
B1 | (South Korea) Kang Bo-bae | 8

==== Semifinals ====
Sunday, August 3, 9:00 am

| Sheet A | 1 | 2 | 3 | 4 | 5 | 6 | 7 | 8 | Final |
| (Hokkaido) Satsuki Fujisawa 🔨 | 0 | 2 | 0 | 1 | 2 | 0 | 3 | X | 8 |
| (Nagano Prefecture) Ikue Kitazawa | 0 | 0 | 1 | 0 | 0 | 2 | 0 | X | 3 |

| Sheet C | 1 | 2 | 3 | 4 | 5 | 6 | 7 | 8 | Final |
| (South Korea) Kang Bo-bae | 0 | 0 | 2 | 0 | 0 | 0 | 2 | X | 4 |
| (Nagano Prefecture) Miyu Ueno 🔨 | 1 | 1 | 0 | 2 | 1 | 1 | 0 | X | 6 |

==== Third place game ====
Sunday, August 3, 12:30 pm

| Sheet B | 1 | 2 | 3 | 4 | 5 | 6 | 7 | 8 | Final |
| (Nagano Prefecture) Ikue Kitazawa 🔨 | 2 | 0 | 1 | 0 | 0 | 1 | 0 | X | 4 |
| (South Korea) Kang Bo-bae | 0 | 2 | 0 | 2 | 3 | 0 | 1 | X | 8 |

==== Final ====
Sunday, August 3, 4:00 pm

| Sheet B | 1 | 2 | 3 | 4 | 5 | 6 | 7 | 8 | Final |
| (Hokkaido) Satsuki Fujisawa | 0 | 2 | 0 | 3 | 1 | 0 | 2 | X | 8 |
| (Nagano Prefecture) Miyu Ueno 🔨 | 1 | 0 | 1 | 0 | 0 | 1 | 0 | X | 3 |
