= Yasumasa Tanida =

Japanese curler (born 1994)

- Curler
- Born: 16 May 1994 (age 32); Nayoro, Hokkaido, Japan

Team
- Skip: Tsuyoshi Yamaguchi
- Fourth: Riku Yanagisawa
- Second: Takeru Yamamoto
- Lead: Satoshi Koizumi
- Alternate: Yasumasa Tanida
- Mixed doubles partner: Chiaki Matsumura

Curling career
- Member Association: Japan
- World Championship: 3 (2016, 2019, 2021)
- World Mixed Doubles Championship: 3 (2022, 2023, 2025)
- Pacific-Asia Championship: 2 (2018, 2019)
- Pan Continental Championship: 1 (2022)
- Other appearances: Curling at the Winter Universiade: 1 (2015); Pacific-Asia Junior Curling Championships: 1 (2014)
Medal record
Men's curling
Representing Japan
World Mixed Doubles Championship
Silver medal – second place	2023 Gangneung
Pacific-Asia Curling Championships
Gold medal – first place	2018 Gangneung
Silver medal – second place	2019 Shenzhen
Representing Hokkaido
Japan Curling Championships
Gold medal – first place	2019 Sapporo
Gold medal – first place	2020 Karuizawa
Gold medal – first place	2021 Wakkanai
Silver medal – second place	2018 Nayoro
Bronze medal – third place	2022 Tokoro
Representing Nagano
Japan Curling Championships
Gold medal – first place	2026 Yokohama

Yasumasa Tanida (谷田 康真, Tanida Yasumasa; born May 16, 1994 in Nayoro, Hokkaido, Japan) is a Japanese curler from Kitami.

== Personal life ==
Tanida is employed as an agricultural machinery mechanic for Hokkaido Kubota.

== Teams and events ==
=== Men's ===
Season	Skip	Third	Second	Lead	Alternate	Coach	Events
2013–14	Yasumasa Tanida	Yuya Takigahira	Shingo Usui	Kazuki Yoshikawa	Ryuji Shibaya	Kenji Ogawa	PAJCC 2014 (4th)
2014–15	Yasumasa Tanida	Yuya Takigahira	Shingo Usui	Kazuki Yoshikawa	Kohsuke Hirata	Kenji Ogawa	WUG 2015 (7th)
2015–16	Yasumasa Tanida	Yuya Takigahira	Shingo Usui	Kazuki Yoshikawa	Tatsuki Sasaki		
2015–16	Yusuke Morozumi	Tetsuro Shimizu	Tsuyoshi Yamaguchi	Kosuke Morozumi	Yasumasa Tanida	Hatomi Nagaoka	WCC 2016 (4th)
2016–17	Shinya Abe	Yuta Matsumura	Yuki Hayashi	Yasumasa Tanida	Hiroshi Sato		JCC 2017 (silver)
2017–18	Yuta Matsumura (fourth)	Yasumasa Tanida	Shinya Abe (skip)	Kosuke Aita			JCC 2018 (silver)
2018–19	Yuta Matsumura	Tetsuro Shimizu	Yasumasa Tanida	Shinya Abe	Kosuke Aita	Bob Ursel	PACC 2018 (gold); WCC 2019 (4th)
2019–20	Yuta Matsumura	Tetsuro Shimizu	Yasumasa Tanida	Kosuke Aita	Shinya Abe	Bob Ursel	PACC 2019 (silver)
2020–21	Yuta Matsumura	Tetsuro Shimizu	Yasumasa Tanida	Shinya Abe	Kosuke Aita	Bob Ursel	WCC 2021 (9th)
2021–22	Yuta Matsumura	Tetsuro Shimizu	Yasumasa Tanida	Shinya Abe	Kosuke Aita		

=== Mixed doubles ===
Season	Female	Male
2016–17	Kaho Onodera	Yasumasa Tanida
2019–20	Chiaki Matsumura	Yasumasa Tanida
2020–21	Chiaki Matsumura	Yasumasa Tanida
2021–22	Chiaki Matsumura	Yasumasa Tanida
2022–23	Chiaki Matsumura	Yasumasa Tanida
2023–24	Chiaki Matsumura	Yasumasa Tanida
2024–25	Chiaki Matsumura	Yasumasa Tanida
2025–26	Chiaki Matsumura	Yasumasa Tanida
