= 2021 Japan Curling Championships =

- Host city: Wakkanai, Hokkaido
- Arena: Wakkanai City Midori Sports Park
- Dates: February 8–14
- Men's winner: Consadole
- Curling club: Tokoro CC, Tokoro, Hokkaido
- Skip: Yuta Matsumura
- Third: Tetsuro Shimizu
- Second: Yasumasa Tanida
- Lead: Shinya Abe
- Alternate: Kosuke Aita
- Coach: Bob Ursel
- Finalist: Tokoro Junior (Maeda)
- Women's winner: Hokkaido Bank
- Curling club: Sapporo CC, Sapporo, Hokkaido
- Skip: Sayaka Yoshimura
- Third: Kaho Onodera
- Second: Anna Ohmiya
- Lead: Yumie Funayama
- Alternate: Ayami Ito
- Coach: Hiroshi Sato
- Finalist: Loco Solare (Fujisawa)

The 2021 Japan Curling Championships (branded as the 38th Zen-Noh Japan Curling Championships) were held from February 8 to 14 at the Wakkanai City Midori Sports Park in Wakkanai, Hokkaido, Japan. Both the men's and women's events were played in a round robin format which qualified four teams for a page playoff.

Due to the COVID-19 pandemic, the event was reduced from its usual nine teams to just seven teams. The winning teams earned the right to represent Japan at the 2021 World Men's Curling Championship and the 2021 World Women's Curling Championship respectively.

The 2021 championship served as a qualifier to Team Japan for the 2022 Winter Olympics for both Consadole's Yuta Matsumura and Loco Solare's Satsuki Fujisawa. Because Consadole won their third straight national title, they were named the Japanese representatives for the 2021 Olympic Qualification Event. Loco Solare lost in the final to Hokkaido Bank's Sayaka Yoshimura, forcing a best-of-five trial between the two rinks to determine who would represent Japan at the qualification event.

== Summary ==
On the men's side, Consadole won their third consecutive and overall national championship. Through the round robin, the team, represented by Yuta Matsumura, Tetsuro Shimizu, Yasumasa Tanida, Shinya Abe and Kosuke Aita, finished in second place with a 5–1 record. They ranked behind the Tokoro Junior team led by Takumi Maeda, who were the surprise of the event. SC Karuizawa Club (Tsuyoshi Yamaguchi) and TM Karuizawa (Yusuke Morozumi) also qualified for the playoffs, each going 4–2 in the round robin. In the 1 vs. 2 page playoff, Consadole took one in an extra end to edge Tokoro Junior 9–8 while TM Karuizawa stole one in the tenth end to eliminate SC Karuizawa Club 5–4. In the semifinal, Tokoro Junior scored four points in the second end and stole three ends en route to an 8–5 victory over TM Karuizawa. Experience prevailed in the gold medal game as Consadole took three in the eighth end and stole a single in the ninth to hold off Tokoro Junior 9–7 and win their third consecutive national title. Since this edition of Consadole formed in 2018, the team has had many successes such as a silver medal at the 2019 Pacific-Asia Curling Championships and a fourth-place finish at the 2019 World Men's Curling Championship.

The women's event saw Hokkaido Bank, skipped by Sayaka Yoshimura, win their second national championship with the first coming in 2015 under skip Ayumi Ogasawara. The Hokkaido Bank team of Yoshimura, Kaho Onodera, Anna Ohmiya, Yumie Funayama and Ayami Ito finished 5–1 through the round robin in second place, trailing defending national champions Loco Solare (Satsuki Fujisawa) who finished a perfect 6–0. Chubu Electric Power (Seina Nakajima) went 4–2 while the playoff picture was rounded out by Fujikyu (Tori Koana) at 3–3. Loco Solare continued their dominant play into the playoffs while they downed Hokkaido Bank 9–4 in the 1 vs. 2 game while Chubu Electric bounced Fujikyu 7–4. Team Yoshimura rebounded in the semifinal game, defeating Chubu Electric 8–2 to advance to the gold medal game. Hokkaido Bank stole two in the third end of the final to lead 3–1 but Loco Solare quickly wrestled the lead back to go up 5–4 after six. After trading singles in ends eight and nine, Team Fujisawa led 6–5 heading into the tenth end. There, Hokkaido Bank scored two points to win 7–6 and claim the national title. Since Ogasawara retired from competitive curling in 2018, the Hokkaido Bank rink won two consecutive bronze medals in 2019 and 2020. The current team found notable success at the 2019 Masters Grand Slam of Curling event where, after entering the event seeded twelfth out of fifteen teams, they reached the final before losing to Tracy Fleury.

== Medalists ==
	Gold	Silver	Bronze
Men	Consadole; Yuta Matsumura; Tetsuro Shimizu; Yasumasa Tanida; Shinya Abe; Kosuke Aita	Tokoro Junior; Takumi Maeda; Uryu Kamikawa; Hiroki Maeda; Asei Nakahara	TM Karuizawa; Yusuke Morozumi; Masaki Iwai; Ryotaro Shukuya; Kosuke Morozumi
Women	Hokkaido Bank; Sayaka Yoshimura; Kaho Onodera; Anna Ohmiya; Yumie Funayama; Ayami Ito	Loco Solare; Satsuki Fujisawa; Chinami Yoshida; Yumi Suzuki; Yurika Yoshida; Kotomi Ishizaki	Chubu Electric Power; Ikue Kitazawa (Fourth); Chiaki Matsumura; Seina Nakajima (Skip); Hasumi Ishigooka; Minori Suzuki

== Men ==
=== Qualification ===
The following teams qualified to participate in the 2021 Japan Curling Championship:

Qualification method	Berths	Qualifying team(s)
2020 Champion	1	Consadole
2020 Runner-Up	1	TM Karuizawa
Hokkaido Region	1	Tokoro Junior
Tōhoku Region	1	Team Iwate
Kanto Region	1	Team Tani
Central Region	1	SC Karuizawa Club
West Japan Region	1	Okayama CA

=== Teams ===
The teams are listed as follows:

Team	Skip	Third	Second	Lead	Alternate	Locale
Consadole	Yuta Matsumura	Tetsuro Shimizu	Yasumasa Tanida	Shinya Abe	Kosuke Aita	Kitami
Okayama CA	Hiroki Yoshioka	Hiromitsu Fujinaka	Hiroshi Fukui	Yusuke Nonomura		Okayama
SC Karuizawa Club	Tsuyoshi Yamaguchi	Riku Yanagisawa	Satoshi Koizumi	Fukuhiro Ohno	Taisei Kanai	Karuizawa
Team Iwate	Kenji Tomabechi	Eiwa Matsubara	Tadashi Sato	Mitsuru Kikuchi	Kazuto Yamaguchi	Iwate
Team Tani	Ryutaro Tani	Shunta Mizukami	Kohei Okamura	Daiki Yamazaki	Takuya Ishikawa	Tokyo
TM Karuizawa	Yusuke Morozumi	Masaki Iwai	Ryotaro Shukuya	Kosuke Morozumi		Karuizawa
Tokoro Junior	Takumi Maeda	Uryu Kamikawa	Hiroki Maeda	Asei Nakahara		Kitami

=== Round robin standings ===
Final Round Robin Standings

Key
Teams to Playoffs

Team	Skip	W	L	W–L	PF	PA	EW	EL	BE	SE	DSC
Tokoro Junior	Takumi Maeda	5	1	1–0	48	33	27	24	3	8	45.83
Consadole	Yuta Matsumura	5	1	0–1	43	25	23	20	8	6	32.07
SC Karuizawa Club	Tsuyoshi Yamaguchi	4	2	1–0	44	35	26	22	1	5	32.68
TM Karuizawa	Yusuke Morozumi	4	2	0–1	43	36	30	22	2	12	41.12
Team Tani	Ryutaro Tani	2	4	–	33	42	22	27	4	5	75.12
Okayama CA	Hiroki Yoshioka	1	5	–	34	43	23	29	0	2	43.98
Team Iwate	Kenji Tomabechi	0	6	–	18	49	18	25	0	2	110.60

=== Round robin results ===
All draws are listed in Japan Standard Time (UTC+09:00).

==== Draw 1 ====
Monday, February 8, 9:00

Sheet A	1	2	3	4	5	6	7	8	9	10	Final
Consadole (Matsumura)	0	0	2	0	1	0	2	0	3	X	8
Team Tani (Tani)	0	0	0	0	0	1	0	1	0	X	2

Sheet B	1	2	3	4	5	6	7	8	9	10	Final
Team Iwate (Tomabechi)	1	0	1	0	0	0	1	0	1	X	4
Okayama CA (Yoshioka)	0	3	0	1	1	2	0	1	0	X	8

Sheet D	1	2	3	4	5	6	7	8	9	10	Final
SC Karuizawa Club (Yamaguchi)	2	0	2	0	4	0	2	0	X	X	10
TM Karuizawa (Morozumi)	0	1	0	0	0	2	0	1	X	X	4

==== Draw 3 ====
Monday, February 8, 18:00

Sheet A	1	2	3	4	5	6	7	8	9	10	Final
Team Iwate (Tomabechi)	0	1	0	0	0	0	1	X	X	X	2
TM Karuizawa (Morozumi)	2	0	2	1	1	3	0	X	X	X	9

Sheet B	1	2	3	4	5	6	7	8	9	10	Final
Tokoro Junior (Maeda)	1	0	0	0	0	2	1	3	0	0	7
Team Tani (Tani)	0	2	0	1	1	0	0	0	2	0	6

Sheet D	1	2	3	4	5	6	7	8	9	10	Final
Consadole (Matsumura)	0	2	0	2	2	0	2	0	0	X	8
SC Karuizawa Club (Yamaguchi)	1	0	1	0	0	1	0	1	0	X	4

==== Draw 5 ====
Tuesday, February 9, 13:30

Sheet A	1	2	3	4	5	6	7	8	9	10	11	Final
Tokoro Junior (Maeda)	2	0	2	0	0	3	0	0	1	0	1	9
SC Karuizawa Club (Yamaguchi)	0	1	0	1	1	0	2	2	0	1	0	8

Sheet B	1	2	3	4	5	6	7	8	9	10	Final
Okayama CA (Yoshioka)	0	3	0	0	1	0	1	0	2	0	7
TM Karuizawa (Morozumi)	2	0	1	1	0	1	0	2	0	2	9

Sheet D	1	2	3	4	5	6	7	8	9	10	Final
Team Iwate (Tomabechi)	0	0	1	0	0	1	0	X	X	X	2
Consadole (Matsumura)	2	2	0	4	1	0	0	X	X	X	9

==== Draw 7 ====
Wednesday, February 10, 9:00

Sheet A	1	2	3	4	5	6	7	8	9	10	Final
Okayama CA (Yoshioka)	1	0	1	0	0	1	0	1	0	X	4
Consadole (Matsumura)	0	2	0	0	3	0	1	0	1	X	7

Sheet B	1	2	3	4	5	6	7	8	9	10	Final
Team Tani (Tani)	0	0	0	2	0	3	0	0	1	0	6
SC Karuizawa Club (Yamaguchi)	1	0	0	0	2	0	3	1	0	1	8

Sheet D	1	2	3	4	5	6	7	8	9	10	Final
Tokoro Junior (Maeda)	2	2	0	3	0	1	X	X	X	X	8
Team Iwate (Tomabechi)	0	0	1	0	1	0	X	X	X	X	2

==== Draw 9 ====
Wednesday, February 10, 18:00

Sheet A	1	2	3	4	5	6	7	8	9	10	Final
Team Tani (Tani)	4	0	0	1	0	1	0	2	0	X	8
Team Iwate (Tomabechi)	0	1	1	0	1	0	1	0	1	X	5

Sheet B	1	2	3	4	5	6	7	8	9	10	Final
TM Karuizawa (Morozumi)	1	0	0	0	2	0	0	1	0	1	5
Consadole (Matsumura)	0	2	0	1	0	2	1	0	0	0	6

Sheet D	1	2	3	4	5	6	7	8	9	10	Final
Okayama CA (Yoshioka)	0	2	0	0	1	0	0	1	0	X	4
Tokoro Junior (Maeda)	2	0	2	2	0	0	1	0	2	X	9

==== Draw 11 ====
Thursday, February 11, 13:30

Sheet A	1	2	3	4	5	6	7	8	9	10	11	Final
TM Karuizawa (Morozumi)	1	1	0	1	0	0	0	1	0	3	1	8
Tokoro Junior (Maeda)	0	0	2	0	2	1	1	0	1	0	0	7

Sheet B	1	2	3	4	5	6	7	8	9	10	Final
SC Karuizawa Club (Yamaguchi)	2	0	2	0	3	0	X	X	X	X	7
Team Iwate (Tomabechi)	0	1	0	1	0	1	X	X	X	X	3

Sheet D	1	2	3	4	5	6	7	8	9	10	Final
Team Tani (Tani)	0	2	0	1	1	1	1	0	0	1	7
Okayama CA (Yoshioka)	1	0	3	0	0	0	0	2	0	0	6

==== Draw 13 ====
Friday, February 12, 9:00

Sheet A	1	2	3	4	5	6	7	8	9	10	Final
SC Karuizawa Club (Yamaguchi)	0	0	2	0	1	0	3	0	1	X	7
Okayama CA (Yoshioka)	1	0	0	1	0	2	0	1	0	X	5

Sheet B	1	2	3	4	5	6	7	8	9	10	Final
Consadole (Matsumura)	2	0	0	0	2	0	0	1	0	X	5
Tokoro Junior (Maeda)	0	2	0	0	0	2	1	0	3	X	8

Sheet D	1	2	3	4	5	6	7	8	9	10	Final
TM Karuizawa (Morozumi)	2	0	1	2	1	0	1	0	1	X	8
Team Tani (Tani)	0	1	0	0	0	2	0	1	0	X	4

=== Playoffs ===
Page playoff system
1	Tokoro Junior	8
2	Consadole	9
3	SC Karuizawa Club	4
4	TM Karuizawa	5

Semifinal
1	Tokoro Junior	8
4	TM Karuizawa	5

Final
2	Consadole	9
1	Tokoro Junior	7

==== 1 vs. 2 ====
Friday, February 12, 18:00

Sheet B	1	2	3	4	5	6	7	8	9	10	11	Final
Tokoro Junior (Maeda)	0	2	0	0	2	0	2	0	0	2	0	8
Consadole (Matsumura)	0	0	2	1	0	3	0	1	1	0	1	9

==== 3 vs. 4 ====
Friday, February 12, 18:00

Sheet D	1	2	3	4	5	6	7	8	9	10	11	Final
SC Karuizawa Club (Yamaguchi)	0	1	0	2	0	0	0	1	0	0	0	4
TM Karuizawa (Morozumi)	2	0	1	0	0	0	0	0	0	1	1	5

==== Semifinal ====
Saturday, February 13, 15:00

Sheet A	1	2	3	4	5	6	7	8	9	10	Final
Tokoro Junior (Maeda)	0	4	1	0	0	1	1	1	0	X	8
TM Karuizawa (Morozumi)	1	0	0	2	1	0	0	0	1	X	5

==== Final ====
Sunday, February 14, 10:00

Sheet B	1	2	3	4	5	6	7	8	9	10	Final
Consadole (Matsumura)	0	2	0	2	0	1	0	3	1	X	9
Tokoro Junior (Maeda)	1	0	1	0	2	0	3	0	0	X	7

2021 Japan Curling Championships
(Japan)
Yuta Matsumura
3rd Japanese Championship title

=== Final standings ===
Place	Team	Skip
1st place, gold medalist(s)	Consadole	Yuta Matsumura
2nd place, silver medalist(s)	Tokoro Junior	Takumi Maeda
3rd place, bronze medalist(s)	TM Karuizawa	Yusuke Morozumi
4	SC Karuizawa Club	Tsuyoshi Yamaguchi
5	Team Tani	Ryutaro Tani
6	Okayama CA	Hiroki Yoshioka
7	Team Iwate	Kenji Tomabechi

== Women ==
=== Qualification ===
The following teams qualified to participate in the 2021 Japan Curling Championship:

Qualification method	Berths	Qualifying team(s)
2020 Champion	1	Loco Solare
2020 Runner-Up	1	Chubu Electric Power
Hokkaido Region	1	Hokkaido Bank
Tōhoku Region	1	Aomori CA
Kanto Region	1	Fujikyu
Central Region	1	SC Karuizawa Club
West Japan Region	1	Team Kurashiki

=== Teams ===
The teams are listed as follows:

Team	Skip	Third	Second	Lead	Alternate	Locale
Aomori CA	Shinobu Aota	Kaoru Ito	Natsuki Saito	Ayako Yoshida	Chieri Yamashita	Aomori
Chubu Electric Power	Ikue Kitazawa (Fourth)	Chiaki Matsumura	Seina Nakajima (Skip)	Hasumi Ishigooka	Minori Suzuki	Nagano
Fujikyu	Tori Koana	Yuna Kotani	Mao Ishigaki	Arisa Kotani	Michiko Tomabechi	Yamanashi
Hokkaido Bank	Sayaka Yoshimura	Kaho Onodera	Anna Ohmiya	Yumie Funayama	Ayami Ito	Sapporo
Loco Solare	Satsuki Fujisawa	Chinami Yoshida	Yumi Suzuki	Yurika Yoshida	Kotomi Ishizaki	Kitami
SC Karuizawa Club	Ami Enami	Asuka Kanai	Junko Nishimuro	Mone Ryokawa		Nagano
Team Kurashiki	Kaori Nobuki	Yuri Takahara	Yukari Ido	Ai Kawada	Ryoko Kawada	Okayama

=== Round robin standings ===
Final Round Robin Standings

Key
Teams to Playoffs

Team	Skip	W	L	W–L	PF	PA	EW	EL	BE	SE	DSC
Loco Solare	Satsuki Fujisawa	6	0	–	67	26	30	17	2	9	17.41
Hokkaido Bank	Sayaka Yoshimura	5	1	–	54	29	31	20	1	12	28.05
Chubu Electric Power	Seina Nakajima	4	2	–	62	29	29	18	4	10	37.07
Fujikyu	Tori Koana	3	3	–	52	40	26	24	4	6	24.54
SC Karuizawa Club	Ami Enami	2	4	–	32	47	22	22	2	8	37.04
Aomori CA	Shinobu Aota	1	5	–	31	41	17	28	1	5	56.19
Team Kurashiki	Kaori Nobuki	0	6	–	5	91	5	31	0	0	134.86

=== Round robin results ===
All draws are listed in Japan Standard Time (UTC+09:00).

==== Draw 2 ====
Monday, February 8, 13:30

Sheet A	1	2	3	4	5	6	7	8	9	10	Final
Fujikyu (Koana)	0	1	0	0	1	0	1	1	0	0	4
Hokkaido Bank (Yoshimura)	0	0	2	0	0	2	0	0	2	1	7

Sheet B	1	2	3	4	5	6	7	8	9	10	Final
Chubu Electric Power (Nakajima)	0	0	1	2	2	2	2	X	X	X	9
Aomori CA (Aota)	0	0	0	0	0	0	0	X	X	X	0

Sheet D	1	2	3	4	5	6	7	8	9	10	Final
Loco Solare (Fujisawa)	3	2	0	5	6	3	X	X	X	X	19
Team Kurashiki (Nobuki)	0	0	1	0	0	0	X	X	X	X	1

==== Draw 4 ====
Tuesday, February 9, 9:00

Sheet A	1	2	3	4	5	6	7	8	9	10	Final
Chubu Electric Power (Nakajima)	5	1	3	0	4	7	X	X	X	X	20
Team Kurashiki (Nobuki)	0	0	0	1	0	0	X	X	X	X	1

Sheet B	1	2	3	4	5	6	7	8	9	10	Final
SC Karuizawa Club (Enami)	0	0	1	0	1	0	0	1	0	X	3
Hokkaido Bank (Yoshimura)	0	2	0	1	0	2	2	0	2	X	9

Sheet D	1	2	3	4	5	6	7	8	9	10	Final
Fujikyu (Koana)	0	3	0	2	0	0	3	0	2	0	10
Loco Solare (Fujisawa)	1	0	5	0	2	1	0	2	0	1	12

==== Draw 6 ====
Tuesday, February 9, 18:00

Sheet A	1	2	3	4	5	6	7	8	9	10	Final
SC Karuizawa Club (Enami)	0	0	0	1	0	0	X	X	X	X	1
Loco Solare (Fujisawa)	0	4	2	0	2	3	X	X	X	X	11

Sheet B	1	2	3	4	5	6	7	8	9	10	Final
Aomori CA (Aota)	5	2	1	2	1	2	X	X	X	X	13
Team Kurashiki (Nobuki)	0	0	0	0	0	0	X	X	X	X	0

Sheet D	1	2	3	4	5	6	7	8	9	10	Final
Chubu Electric Power (Nakajima)	2	0	2	0	0	1	0	2	0	3	10
Fujikyu (Koana)	0	2	0	1	0	0	3	0	2	0	8

==== Draw 8 ====
Wednesday, February 10, 13:30

Sheet A	1	2	3	4	5	6	7	8	9	10	11	Final
Aomori CA (Aota)	0	0	1	0	1	0	2	0	0	2	0	6
Fujikyu (Koana)	1	0	0	1	0	3	0	0	1	0	2	8

Sheet B	1	2	3	4	5	6	7	8	9	10	11	Final
Hokkaido Bank (Yoshimura)	0	0	1	0	2	0	1	1	0	3	0	8
Loco Solare (Fujisawa)	0	2	0	3	0	2	0	0	1	0	1	9

Sheet D	1	2	3	4	5	6	7	8	9	10	Final
SC Karuizawa Club (Enami)	0	0	1	0	0	2	0	2	0	X	5
Chubu Electric Power (Nakajima)	1	1	0	2	2	0	2	0	5	X	13

==== Draw 10 ====
Thursday, February 11, 9:00

Sheet A	1	2	3	4	5	6	7	8	9	10	Final
Hokkaido Bank (Yoshimura)	1	0	2	0	1	0	2	1	0	1	8
Chubu Electric Power (Nakajima)	0	1	0	2	0	2	0	0	1	0	6

Sheet B	1	2	3	4	5	6	7	8	9	10	Final
Team Kurashiki (Nobuki)	0	0	0	0	1	0	X	X	X	X	1
Fujikyu (Koana)	4	1	5	1	0	2	X	X	X	X	13

Sheet D	1	2	3	4	5	6	7	8	9	10	Final
Aomori CA (Aota)	0	0	0	3	0	0	1	0	0	0	4
SC Karuizawa Club (Enami)	0	1	2	0	1	1	0	0	1	1	7

==== Draw 12 ====
Thursday, February 11, 18:00

Sheet A	1	2	3	4	5	6	7	8	9	10	Final
Team Kurashiki (Nobuki)	0	0	0	0	0	1	X	X	X	X	1
SC Karuizawa Club (Enami)	3	4	3	1	1	0	X	X	X	X	12

Sheet B	1	2	3	4	5	6	7	8	9	10	Final
Loco Solare (Fujisawa)	0	2	0	2	0	0	2	0	1	X	7
Chubu Electric Power (Nakajima)	1	0	1	0	0	1	0	1	0	X	4

Sheet D	1	2	3	4	5	6	7	8	9	10	Final
Hokkaido Bank (Yoshimura)	0	2	1	2	0	1	1	1	0	X	8
Aomori CA (Aota)	3	0	0	0	2	0	0	0	1	X	6

==== Draw 14 ====
Friday, February 12, 13:30

Sheet A	1	2	3	4	5	6	7	8	9	10	Final
Loco Solare (Fujisawa)	2	1	1	1	0	2	0	2	X	X	9
Aomori CA (Aota)	0	0	0	0	1	0	1	0	X	X	2

Sheet B	1	2	3	4	5	6	7	8	9	10	Final
Fujikyu (Koana)	2	0	0	3	0	0	3	1	0	X	9
SC Karuizawa Club (Enami)	0	1	1	0	1	0	0	0	1	X	4

Sheet D	1	2	3	4	5	6	7	8	9	10	Final
Team Kurashiki (Nobuki)	0	0	0	0	0	1	X	X	X	X	1
Hokkaido Bank (Yoshimura)	4	1	3	2	4	0	X	X	X	X	14

=== Playoffs ===
Page playoff system
1	Loco Solare	9
2	Hokkaido Bank	4
3	Chubu Electric Power	7
4	Fujikyu	4

Semifinal
2	Hokkaido Bank	8
3	Chubu Electric Power	2

Final
1	Loco Solare	6
2	Hokkaido Bank	7

==== 1 vs. 2 ====
Saturday, February 13, 10:00

Sheet B	1	2	3	4	5	6	7	8	9	10	Final
Loco Solare (Fujisawa)	1	0	3	0	0	0	2	1	2	X	9
Hokkaido Bank (Yoshimura)	0	2	0	1	0	1	0	0	0	X	4

==== 3 vs. 4 ====
Saturday, February 13, 10:00

Sheet A	1	2	3	4	5	6	7	8	9	10	Final
Chubu Electric Power (Nakajima)	0	1	0	1	0	2	1	2	0	X	7
Fujikyu (Koana)	0	0	2	0	1	0	0	0	1	X	4

==== Semifinal ====
Saturday, February 13, 15:00

Sheet D	1	2	3	4	5	6	7	8	9	10	Final
Hokkaido Bank (Yoshimura)	3	0	1	1	1	0	1	1	X	X	8
Chubu Electric Power (Nakajima)	0	1	0	0	0	1	0	0	X	X	2

==== Final ====
Sunday, February 14, 15:30

Sheet B	1	2	3	4	5	6	7	8	9	10	Final
Loco Solare (Fujisawa)	1	0	0	2	0	2	0	0	1	0	6
Hokkaido Bank (Yoshimura)	0	1	2	0	1	0	0	1	0	2	7

2021 Japan Curling Championships
(Japan)
Sayaka Yoshimura
2nd Japanese Championship title

=== Final standings ===
Place	Team	Skip
1st place, gold medalist(s)	Hokkaido Bank	Sayaka Yoshimura
2nd place, silver medalist(s)	Loco Solare	Satsuki Fujisawa
3rd place, bronze medalist(s)	Chubu Electric Power	Seina Nakajima
4	Fujikyu	Tori Koana
5	SC Karuizawa Club	Ami Enami
6	Aomori CA	Shinobu Aota
7	Team Kurashiki	Kaori Nobuki
