= Riku Yanagisawa =

Japanese curler

- Curler
- Born: 10 October 2001 (age 25); Karuizawa, Nagano

Team
- Curling club: SC Karuizawa Club, Karuizawa, Nagano
- Skip: Tsuyoshi Yamaguchi
- Fourth: Riku Yanagisawa
- Second: Takeru Yamamoto
- Lead: Satoshi Koizumi
- Alternate: Yasumasa Tanida

Curling career
- Member Association: Japan
- World Championship: 3 (2023, 2025, 2026)
- Pan Continental Championship: 3 (2022, 2023, 2025)
Medal record
Men's curling
Representing Japan
Pan Continental Championships
Bronze medal – third place	2023 Kelowna
Bronze medal – third place	2025 Virginia
Representing Nagano
Japan Curling Championships
Gold medal – first place	2022 Tokoro
Gold medal – first place	2023 Tokoro
Gold medal – first place	2025 Yokohama
Gold medal – first place	2026 Yokohama
Silver medal – second place	2024 Sapporo
Bronze medal – third place	2018 Nayoro
Bronze medal – third place	2020 Karuizawa

Riku Yanagisawa (栁澤李空, Yanagisawa Riku; born 10 October 2001) is a Japanese curler. He is a three-time Japanese men's champion skip.

== Career ==
Yanagisawa played second on the Karuizawa SC team skipped by Yoshiro Shimizu 2018 Japan Curling Championships. The team finished the round robin portion of the tournament with a 6–2 record, making the playoffs. In the playoffs, they defeated Naomasa Takeda in the 3 vs. 4 game, before losing to Masaki Iwai in the semifinal, settling for third place.

Yanagisawa moved to third on the Karuizawa team in 2019, which was now skipped by Tsuyoshi Yamaguchi. The team played in the 2020 Japan Curling Championships, where they again went 6–2 in the round robin. In the playoffs, they defeated Yuya Takigahira in the 3 vs. 4 game, before losing to Yusuke Morozumi in the semifinal. That season, the team played in many tour events, winning the Moosehead Fall Open in Canada, and the Keijinkai Rizing Cup back home in Japan.

The team played in the 2021 Japanese Championship as well, finishing the round robin with a 4–2 record. However, in the playoffs, they lost in the 3 vs. 4 game to Morozumi.

The following season, Yanagisawa took over as skip of the Karuizawa SC team. Yanagisawa and his team of Yamaguchi now at third, a 15 year old Takeru Yamamoto and Satoshi Koizumi went undefeated in the round robin of the 2022 Japanese championship. In the playoffs, they lost the 1 vs. 2 game to Hayato Sato's Sapporo International University team. They rebounded by defeating Yasumasa Tanida in the semifinal, before defeating Sato in the final, winning the gold medal.

With the win, the team represented Japan at the inaugural 2022 Pan Continental Curling Championships. There, he led Japan to a 3–4 round robin record. This was still good enough to make it to the playoffs, but they lost the semifinal to Canada, and the bronze medal game to the United States. The team had a strong season on the tour, winning the Prestige Hotels & Resorts Curling Classic, Karuizawa International Curling Championships and the King Cash Spiel. The team would tour Canada for over three months from August to December, and were based out of Kelowna, British Columbia, where they trained with their coach Bob Ursel. Later in the season, they had another successful run at the Japanese national championships in 2023. There, they went 7–1 in the round robin, before winning the 1 vs. 2 game against Kohsuke Hirata, and beating Hirata again in the final. The win qualified the team to represent Japan at the 2023 World Men's Curling Championship. At the Worlds, the team finished with a 5–7 record, missing the playoffs and finishing seventh overall.

== Personal life ==
Yanagisawa grew up in Karuizawa. He currently works as a manufacturer.

== Grand Slam record ==
Key
C	Champion
F	Lost in Final
SF	Lost in Semifinal
QF	Lost in Quarterfinals
R16	Lost in the round of 16
Q	Did not advance to playoffs
T2	Played in Tier 2 event
DNP	Did not participate in event
N/A	Not a Grand Slam event that season

Event	2023–24	2024–25	2025–26	2026–27
Invitational	Q	T2	DNP	Q
Masters	DNP	DNP	T2	Q
National	Q	DNP	DNP	Q
Open	DNP	DNP	T2	DNP
