= Shinya Abe =

Japanese curler and coach (born 1980)

- Curler
- Born: January 6, 1980 (age 46); Kitami, Japan

Team
- Curling club: Tokoro CC, Kitami, Japan
- Skip: Shinya Abe
- Fourth: Tetsuro Shimizu
- Second: Haruto Ouchi
- Lead: Hayato Sato
- Alternate: Asei Nakahara

Curling career
- Member Association: Japan
- World Championship: 3 (2019, 2021, 2024)
- World Mixed Doubles Championship: 1 (2017)
- Pacific-Asia Championship: 4 (1996, 2013, 2018, 2019)
- Pan Continental Championship: 1 (2024)
Medal record
Men's curling
Representing Japan
Pan Continental Championships
Silver medal – second place	2024 Lacombe
Pacific-Asia Championships
Gold medal – first place	2018 Gangneung
Silver medal – second place	1996 Sydney
Silver medal – second place	2013 Shanghai
Silver medal – second place	2019 Shenzhen
Representing Hokkaido
Japan Curling Championships
Gold medal – first place	1996 Karuizawa
Gold medal – first place	2019 Sapporo
Gold medal – first place	2020 Karuizawa
Gold medal – first place	2021 Wakkanai
Gold medal – first place	2024 Sapporo
Silver medal – second place	2000 Karuizawa
Silver medal – second place	2015 Tokoro
Silver medal – second place	2017 Karuizawa
Silver medal – second place	2018 Nayoro
Bronze medal – third place	1997 Karuizawa
Bronze medal – third place	1998 Tokoro
Bronze medal – third place	2003 Karuizawa
Bronze medal – third place	2013 Sapporo
Bronze medal – third place	2016 Aomori
Bronze medal – third place	2022 Tokoro
Bronze medal – third place	2023 Tokoro
Bronze medal – third place	2025 Yokohama
Representing Aomori
Japan Curling Championships
Bronze medal – third place	2004 Moseushi

Shinya Abe (阿部 晋也, Abe Shin'ya; born January 6, 1980) is a Japanese curler and curling coach from Sapporo, Japan.

== Personal life ==
Abe is employed as a curling team manager at Consadole Hokkaido Sports Club. He is married.

== Teams and events ==
=== Men's ===
Season	Skip	Third	Second	Lead	Alternate	Coach	Events
1996	Hiroshi Sato	Makoto Tsuruga	Kazuhito Hori	Shinya Abe	Hiroshi Tsuruga		WJCC 1996 (7th)
1996–97	Hiroshi Sato	Makoto Tsuruga	Kazuhito Hori	Shinya Abe	Hirohumi Kudo		JMCC 1996 (gold); PCC 1996 (silver)
1998	Makoto Tsuruga	Hiroshi Sato	Kazuhito Hori	Shinya Abe	Yusuke Hirosawa		WJCC 1998 (5th)
2012–13	Shinya Abe	Yuta Matsumura	Naomasa Takeda	Hiroshi Sato	Yuki Hayashi		
2013–14	Shinya Abe	Yuta Matsumura	Naomasa Takeda	Hiroshi Sato	Yuki Hayashi		
2013–14	Yusuke Morozumi	Tsuyoshi Yamaguchi	Tetsuro Shimizu	Kosuke Morozumi	Shinya Abe	Hatomi Nagaoka	PACC 2013 (silver)
2014–15	Shinya Abe	Yuta Matsumura	Yuki Hayashi	Hiroshi Sato			JMCC 2015 (silver)
2015–16	Shinya Abe	Yuta Matsumura	Yuki Hayashi	Hiroshi Sato			JMCC 2016 (bronze)
2016–17	Shinya Abe	Yuta Matsumura	Yuki Hayashi	Hiroshi Sato	Yasumasa Tanida		JMCC 2017 (silver)
2017–18	Yuta Matsumura (Fourth)	Yasumasa Tanida	Shinya Abe (Skip)	Kosuke Aita			JMCC 2018 (silver)
2018–19	Yuta Matsumura	Tetsuro Shimizu	Yasumasa Tanida	Shinya Abe	Kosuke Aita	Bob Ursel	PACC 2018 (gold); JMCC 2019 (gold); WCC 2019 (4th)
2019–20	Yuta Matsumura	Tetsuro Shimizu	Yasumasa Tanida	Kosuke Aita	Shinya Abe	Bob Ursel	PACC 2019 (silver); JMCC 2020 (gold)
2020–21	Yuta Matsumura	Tetsuro Shimizu	Yasumasa Tanida	Shinya Abe	Kosuke Aita	Bob Ursel	JMCC 2021 (gold); WCC 2021 (9th)
2021–22	Yuta Matsumura	Tetsuro Shimizu	Yasumasa Tanida	Shinya Abe	Kosuke Aita		JMCC 2022 (bronze)
2022–23	Tetsuro Shimizu (Fourth)	Haruto Ouchi	Shinya Abe (Skip)	Minori Suzuki	Sota Tsuruga		JMCC 2023 (bronze)
2023–24	Tetsuro Shimizu (Fourth)	Shinya Abe (Skip)	Haruto Ouchi	Sota Tsuruga	Makoto Tsuruga		JMCC 2024 (gold)
2023–24	Tetsuro Shimizu (Fourth)	Shinya Abe (Skip)	Haruto Ouchi	Sota Tsuruga	Asei Nakahara	Bob Ursel	WCC 2024 (11th)
2024–25	Tetsuro Shimizu (Fourth)	Shinya Abe (Skip)	Hayato Sato	Haruto Ouchi	Sota Tsuruga	Bob Ursel	PCCC 2024 (silver); JMCC 2025 (bronze)
2025–26	Tetsuro Shimizu (Fourth)	Shinya Abe (Skip)	Hayato Sato	Haruto Ouchi	Sota Tsuruga	Bob Ursel	
2026–27	Tetsuro Shimizu (Fourth)	Shinya Abe (Skip)	Haruto Ouchi	Hayato Sato	Asei Nakahara	Makoto Tsuruga	JMCC 2026 (4th)

=== Mixed doubles ===
Season	Male	Female	Coach	Events
2016–17	Shinya Abe	Ayumi Ogasawara	Hiroshi Sato	WMDCC 2017 (19th)

== Record as a coach of national teams ==
Year	Tournament, event	National team	Place
2006	2006 Winter Olympics	Japan (women)	7
2006	2006 Pacific Curling Championships	Japan (women)	3rd place, bronze medalist(s)
2007	2007 Winter Universiade	Japan (women)	3rd place, bronze medalist(s)
2007	2007 Pacific Curling Championships	Japan (women)	2nd place, silver medalist(s)
2008	2008 Ford World Women's Curling Championship	Japan (women)	4
2008	2008 Pacific Curling Championships	Japan (women)	3rd place, bronze medalist(s)
2009	2009 Pacific Curling Championships	Japan (women)	2nd place, silver medalist(s)
2010	2010 Winter Olympics	Japan (women)	8
2010	2010 Ford World Women's Curling Championship	Japan (women)	11
2010	2010 Pacific Curling Championships	Japan (women)	3rd place, bronze medalist(s)
2011	2011 Pacific-Asia Curling Championships	Japan (men)	6
