= Kohsuke Hirata =

Japanese curler (born 1992)

- Curler
- Born: May 1, 1992 (age 34); Tokoro, Hokkaido, Japan

Team
- Curling club: Karuizawa CC, Karuizawa
- Skip: Kohsuke Hirata
- Third: Shingo Usui
- Second: Ryota Meguro
- Lead: Yoshiya Miura
- Alternate: Kosuke Aita

Curling career
- Member Association: Japan
- World Championship: 1 (2017)
- Pacific-Asia Championship: 3 (2015, 2016, 2017)
- Olympic: 1 (2018)
- Other appearances: Winter Universiade: 2 (2015, 2017)
Medal record
Men's curling
Representing Japan
Pacific-Asia Championships
Gold medal – first place	2016 Uiseong
Silver medal – second place	2015 Almaty
Bronze medal – third place	2017 Erina
Asian Winter Games
Silver medal – second place	2017 Sapporo
Japan Curling Championships
Silver medal – second place	2023 Tokoro

Kohsuke Hirata (Japanese: 平田 洸介, born May 1, 1992, in Tokoro, Hokkaido, Japan) is a Japanese curler, a 2016 Pacific-Asian champion. He currently skips his own team out of Kitami.

He participated in the 2018 Winter Olympics, where the Japanese men's team finished in eighth place.

== Teams ==
Season	Skip	Third	Second	Lead	Alternate	Coach	Events
2013–14	Kohsuke Hirata	Ryuji Shibaya	Shiya Miurayo	Hiromu Otani	Yuta Higuchi		
2014–15	Yasumasa Tanida	Yuya Takigahira	Shingo Usui	Kazuki Yoshikawa	Kohsuke Hirata	Kenji Ogawa	WUG 2015 (7th)
2015–16	Yusuke Morozumi	Tsuyoshi Yamaguchi	Tetsuro Shimizu	Kosuke Morozumi	Kohsuke Hirata	Hatomi Nagaoka	PACC 2015 (silver)
2015–16	Kohsuke Hirata	Rui Ishida	Yuto Kamada	Yoshiya Miura			
2016–17	Kohsuke Hirata	Yoshiya Miura	Hiromu Otani	Yuto Kamada	Daiki Shikano	Hirofumi Kobayashi	WUG 2017 (9th)
2016–17	Yusuke Morozumi	Tsuyoshi Yamaguchi	Tetsuro Shimizu	Kosuke Morozumi	Kohsuke Hirata	Hatomi Nagaoka, James Douglas Lind	PACC 2016 (gold); AWG 2017 (silver); WCC 2017 (7th)
2017–18	Yusuke Morozumi	Tsuyoshi Yamaguchi	Tetsuro Shimizu	Kosuke Morozumi	Kohsuke Hirata	Hatomi Nagaoka	PACC 2017 (bronze); WOG 2018 (8th)
2018–19	Kohsuke Hirata (fourth)	Shingo Usui (skip)	Daiki Shikano	Yoshiya Miura			
2019–20	Kohsuke Hirata (fourth)	Shingo Usui (skip)	Yoshiya Miura	Sota Jutori			
2021–22	Kohsuke Hirata	Shingo Usui	Ryota Meguro	Yoshiya Miura	Syunta Kobayashi	Hirofumi Kobayashi	
2022–23	Kohsuke Hirata	Shingo Usui	Ryota Meguro	Yoshiya Miura	Kosuke Aita		JMCC 2023 (silver)
2023–24	Kohsuke Hirata	Shingo Usui	Ryota Meguro	Yoshiya Miura	Kosuke Aita		
