= Tetsuro Shimizu =

Japanese curler

- Curler
- Born: February 10, 1988 (age 38); Karuizawa, Nagano

Team
- Curling club: Tokoro CC, Kitami, Japan
- Skip: Shinya Abe
- Fourth: Tetsuro Shimizu
- Second: Haruto Ouchi
- Lead: Hayato Sato
- Alternate: Asei Nakahara

Curling career
- Member Association: Japan
- World Championship: 9 (2009, 2013, 2014, 2015, 2016, 2017, 2019, 2021, 2024)
- Pacific-Asia Championship: 11 (2007, 2008, 2009, 2012, 2013, 2014, 2015, 2016, 2017, 2018, 2019)
- Pan Continental Championship: 1 (2024)
- Olympic: 1 (2018)
Medal record
Men's curling
Representing Japan
Pan Continental Championships
Silver medal – second place	2024 Lacombe
Pacific-Asia Championships
Gold medal – first place	2016 Uiseong
Gold medal – first place	2018 Gangneung
Silver medal – second place	2008 Naseby
Silver medal – second place	2009 Karuizawa
Silver medal – second place	2012 Naseby
Silver medal – second place	2013 Shanghai
Silver medal – second place	2014 Karuizawa
Silver medal – second place	2015 Almaty
Silver medal – second place	2019 Shenzhen
Bronze medal – third place	2017 Erina
Representing Nagano
Japan Curling Championships
Gold medal – first place	2007 Tokoro
Gold medal – first place	2008 Karuizawa
Gold medal – first place	2009 Aomori
Gold medal – first place	2013 Sapporo
Gold medal – first place	2014 Karuizawa
Gold medal – first place	2015 Tokoro
Gold medal – first place	2016 Aomori
Gold medal – first place	2017 Karuizawa
Silver medal – second place	2006 Karuizawa
Silver medal – second place	2010 Tokoro
Silver medal – second place	2012 Aomori
Bronze medal – third place	2005 Karuizawa
Representing Hokkaido
Japan Curling Championships
Gold medal – first place	2019 Sapporo
Gold medal – first place	2020 Karuizawa
Gold medal – first place	2021 Wakkanai
Gold medal – first place	2024 Sapporo
Bronze medal – third place	2022 Tokoro
Bronze medal – third place	2023 Tokoro
Bronze medal – third place	2025 Yokohama

Tetsuro Shimizu (清水 徹郎, Shimizu Tetsurō; born February 10, 1988) is a Japanese curler from Sapporo. He competed at the 2015 Ford World Men's Curling Championship in Halifax, Nova Scotia, Canada, as vice-skip for the Japanese team, which placed sixth in the tournament.

== Personal life ==
Shimizu is employed as a warehouse worker for Shizunai Logos. His sister is Japanese curler Emi Shimizu.
