= 2023 Tour Challenge =

Grand Slam of Curling event

2023 HearingLife Tour Challenge
- Host city: Niagara Falls, Ontario
- Arena: Gale Centre
- Dates: October 17–22
- Men's winner: (Italy) Team Retornaz
- Curling club: Trentino Curling, Cembra
- Skip: Joël Retornaz
- Third: Amos Mosaner
- Second: Sebastiano Arman
- Lead: Mattia Giovanella
- Coach: Ryan Fry
- Finalist: (Alberta) Brendan Bottcher
- Women's winner: (Manitoba) Team Jones
- Curling club: St. Vital CC, Winnipeg
- Skip: Jennifer Jones
- Third: Karlee Burgess
- Second: Emily Zacharias
- Lead: Lauren Lenentine
- Coach: Glenn Howard
- Finalist: (Manitoba) Kaitlyn Lawes

The 2023 HearingLife Tour Challenge was held from October 17 to 22 at the Gale Centre in Niagara Falls, Ontario. It was the first Grand Slam event of the 2023–24 curling season.

== Qualification ==
The Tour Challenge consists of two tiers of 16 teams. For Tier 1, the top 16 ranked men's and women's teams on the World Curling Federation's world team rankings as of September 18, 2023 qualified. In the event that a team declines their invitation, the next-ranked team on the world team ranking is invited until the field is complete. For Tier 2, the next 16 teams on the WCF rankings as of September 18, 2023 were invited.

=== Men ===
==== Tier 1 ====
Top world team ranking men's teams:

1. (Scotland) Bruce Mouat
2. (Alberta) Brendan Bottcher
3. (Newfoundland and Labrador) Brad Gushue
4. (Italy) Joël Retornaz
5. (Sweden) Niklas Edin
6. (Switzerland) Yannick Schwaller
7. (Manitoba) Matt Dunstone
8. (Alberta) Kevin Koe
9. (Scotland) Ross Whyte
10. (United States) Korey Dropkin
11. (Norway) Magnus Ramsfjell
12. (Manitoba) Reid Carruthers
13. (United States) John Shuster
14. (Netherlands) Wouter Gösgens
15. (Alberta) Aaron Sluchinski
16. (Japan) Riku Yanagisawa

==== Tier 2 ====
1. (Scotland) Cameron Bryce
2. (Alberta) Karsten Sturmay
3. (Scotland) James Craik
4. (Saskatchewan) Mike McEwen
5. (Switzerland) Marco Hösli
6. (Ontario) John Epping
7. (Switzerland) Michael Brunner
8. (Manitoba) Ryan Wiebe
9. (United States) Daniel Casper
10. (Quebec) ~~Félix Asselin~~
11. (Norway) Lukas Høstmælingen
12. (Sweden) Fredrik Nyman
13. (British Columbia) Catlin Schneider
14. (Saskatchewan) ~~Kelly Knapp~~
15. (Japan) Yusuke Morozumi
16. (Ontario) Sam Mooibroek
17. (Ontario) ~~Tanner Horgan~~
18. (South Korea) Jeong Byeong-jin
19. (Saskatchewan) Rylan Kleiter

=== Women ===
==== Tier 1 ====
Top world team ranking women's teams:

1. (Switzerland) Silvana Tirinzoni
2. (Manitoba) Kerri Einarson
3. (Ontario) Rachel Homan
4. (Japan) Satsuki Fujisawa
5. (South Korea) Gim Eun-ji
6. (Manitoba) Jennifer Jones
7. (Sweden) Anna Hasselborg
8. (Sweden) Isabella Wranå
9. (United States) Tabitha Peterson
10. (British Columbia) Clancy Grandy
11. (Manitoba) Kate Cameron
12. (Manitoba) Kaitlyn Lawes
13. (Norway) Marianne Rørvik
14. (South Korea) Ha Seung-youn
15. (Italy) Stefania Constantini
16. (Scotland) Rebecca Morrison

==== Tier 2 ====
1. (Nova Scotia) Christina Black
2. (Switzerland) Corrie Hürlimann
3. (Japan) Ikue Kitazawa
4. (United States) Delaney Strouse
5. (Japan) Sayaka Yoshimura
6. (Ontario) Isabelle Ladouceur
7. (South Korea) Kim Eun-jung
8. (Alberta) Kayla Skrlik
9. (Alberta) Jessie Hunkin
10. (Denmark) Madeleine Dupont
11. (Alberta) Serena Gray-Withers
12. (Ontario) Danielle Inglis
13. (Switzerland) Michèle Jäggi
14. (Manitoba) Jolene Campbell
15. (Saskatchewan) Nancy Martin
16. (British Columbia) ~~Corryn Brown~~
17. (United States) Sarah Anderson

== Men ==
=== Tier 1 ===
==== Teams ====
The teams are listed as follows:

Skip	Third	Second	Lead	Alternate	Locale
Brendan Bottcher	Marc Kennedy	Brett Gallant	Ben Hebert		Calgary, Alberta
Reid Carruthers	Brad Jacobs	Derek Samagalski	Connor Njegovan		Winnipeg, Manitoba
Korey Dropkin (Fourth)	Andrew Stopera (Skip)	Mark Fenner	Thomas Howell		(United States) Duluth, Minnesota
Matt Dunstone	B. J. Neufeld	Colton Lott	Ryan Harnden		Winnipeg, Manitoba
Niklas Edin	Oskar Eriksson	Rasmus Wranå	Christoffer Sundgren		Karlstad, Sweden
Wouter Gösgens	Laurens Hoekman	Jaap van Dorp	Tobias van den Hurk	Alexander Magan	Zoetermeer, Netherlands
Brad Gushue	Mark Nichols	E. J. Harnden	Geoff Walker		St. John's, Newfoundland and Labrador
Kevin Koe	Tyler Tardi	Jacques Gauthier	Karrick Martin		Calgary, Alberta
Bruce Mouat	Grant Hardie	Bobby Lammie	Hammy McMillan Jr.		Stirling, Scotland
Magnus Ramsfjell	Martin Sesaker	Bendik Ramsfjell	Gaute Nepstad		Trondheim, Norway
Joël Retornaz	Amos Mosaner	Sebastiano Arman	Mattia Giovanella		Trentino, Italy
Benoît Schwarz-van Berkel (Fourth)	Yannick Schwaller (Skip)	Sven Michel	Pablo Lachat		Geneva, Switzerland
John Shuster	Matt Hamilton	Colin Hufman (Note: With third Chris Plys absent, alternate Colin Hufman moved into the lineup at second and second Matt Hamilton moved up to third.)	John Landsteiner		(United States) Duluth, Minnesota
Aaron Sluchinski	Jeremy Harty	Kerr Drummond	Dylan Webster		Airdrie, Alberta
Ross Whyte	Robin Brydone	Duncan McFadzean	Euan Kyle		Stirling, Scotland
Riku Yanagisawa	Tsuyoshi Yamaguchi	Takeru Yamamoto	Satoshi Koizumi		Karuizawa, Japan

==== Round robin standings ====
Final Round Robin Standings

Key
Teams to Playoffs

Pool A	W	L	PF	PA	SO
(Manitoba) Reid Carruthers	2	2	16	14	7
(Sweden) Niklas Edin	2	2	25	24	8
(Japan) Riku Yanagisawa	1	3	19	22	1
(Scotland) Bruce Mouat	1	3	18	21	6

Pool D	W	L	PF	PA	SO
(Italy) Joël Retornaz	3	1	21	14	2
(Scotland) Ross Whyte	3	1	25	18	10
(Alberta) Kevin Koe	2	2	19	23	9
(United States) John Shuster	2	2	16	23	14

Pool B	W	L	PF	PA	SO
(Switzerland) Yannick Schwaller	3	1	23	20	4
(Alberta) Brendan Bottcher	2	2	18	18	5
(Alberta) Aaron Sluchinski	2	2	16	19	12
(Norway) Magnus Ramsfjell	2	2	19	24	15

Pool C	W	L	PF	PA	SO
(Newfoundland and Labrador) Brad Gushue	3	1	26	16	3
(Manitoba) Matt Dunstone	3	1	22	12	11
(United States) Team Dropkin	1	3	19	22	13
(Netherlands) Wouter Gösgens	0	4	14	26	16

==== Round robin results ====
All draw times are listed in Eastern Time (UTC−04:00).

===== Draw 2 =====
Tuesday, October 17, 11:30 am

Sheet A	1	2	3	4	5	6	7	8	Final
(Italy) Joël Retornaz	0	0	0	3	0	1	0	1	5
(Japan) Riku Yanagisawa 🔨	1	0	0	0	1	0	2	0	4

Sheet B	1	2	3	4	5	6	7	8	Final
(Scotland) Bruce Mouat 🔨	0	1	3	0	0	1	0	0	5
(United States) John Shuster	0	0	0	2	1	0	2	1	6

Sheet C	1	2	3	4	5	6	7	8	Final
(Alberta) Kevin Koe 🔨	0	0	3	0	1	0	0	1	5
(Manitoba) Reid Carruthers	0	1	0	1	0	1	1	0	4

Sheet D	1	2	3	4	5	6	7	8	Final
(Sweden) Niklas Edin 🔨	2	0	0	2	0	0	1	0	5
(Scotland) Ross Whyte	0	2	0	0	4	1	0	1	8

===== Draw 4 =====
Tuesday, October 17, 6:30 pm

Sheet A	1	2	3	4	5	6	7	8	Final
(Alberta) Brendan Bottcher 🔨	0	0	0	1	1	2	0	0	4
(Netherlands) Wouter Gösgens	0	0	0	0	0	0	2	1	3

Sheet B	1	2	3	4	5	6	7	8	Final
(Newfoundland and Labrador) Brad Gushue 🔨	3	0	4	1	0	X	X	X	8
(Alberta) Aaron Sluchinski	0	1	0	0	1	X	X	X	2

Sheet C	1	2	3	4	5	6	7	8	Final
(Switzerland) Yannick Schwaller	0	1	0	0	2	0	0	X	3
(United States) Team Dropkin 🔨	2	0	1	0	0	3	2	X	8

Sheet D	1	2	3	4	5	6	7	8	Final
(Manitoba) Matt Dunstone	0	3	0	1	0	1	1	X	6
(Norway) Magnus Ramsfjell 🔨	2	0	0	0	1	0	0	X	3

===== Draw 5 =====
Wednesday, October 18, 8:00 am

Sheet A	1	2	3	4	5	6	7	8	Final
(Sweden) Niklas Edin 🔨	1	0	2	1	0	2	3	X	9
(United States) John Shuster	0	2	0	0	2	0	0	X	4

Sheet B	1	2	3	4	5	6	7	8	Final
(Italy) Joël Retornaz 🔨	0	1	1	0	1	0	1	X	4
(Manitoba) Reid Carruthers	0	0	0	1	0	1	0	X	2

Sheet C	1	2	3	4	5	6	7	8	Final
(Scotland) Bruce Mouat 🔨	2	0	0	0	0	0	1	0	3
(Scotland) Ross Whyte	0	1	0	1	2	1	0	1	6

Sheet D	1	2	3	4	5	6	7	8	Final
(Alberta) Kevin Koe	0	2	0	0	2	0	1	0	5
(Japan) Riku Yanagisawa 🔨	1	0	1	1	0	2	0	1	6

===== Draw 7 =====
Wednesday, October 18, 3:30 pm

Sheet A	1	2	3	4	5	6	7	8	Final
(United States) Team Dropkin	0	0	1	0	2	0	1	1	5
(Norway) Magnus Ramsfjell 🔨	2	0	0	3	0	1	0	0	6

Sheet B	1	2	3	4	5	6	7	8	Final
(Switzerland) Yannick Schwaller	0	2	0	1	0	2	0	1	6
(Manitoba) Matt Dunstone 🔨	1	0	2	0	1	0	1	0	5

Sheet C	1	2	3	4	5	6	7	8	Final
(Netherlands) Wouter Gösgens	0	2	0	0	1	0	0	X	3
(Alberta) Aaron Sluchinski 🔨	2	0	1	3	0	0	1	X	7

Sheet D	1	2	3	4	5	6	7	8	Final
(Alberta) Brendan Bottcher 🔨	1	0	1	0	1	0	2	0	5
(Newfoundland and Labrador) Brad Gushue	0	1	0	1	0	2	0	2	6

===== Draw 9 =====
Thursday, October 19, 8:00 am

Sheet A	1	2	3	4	5	6	7	8	9	Final
(Newfoundland and Labrador) Brad Gushue	0	0	0	2	0	1	0	2	0	5
(Switzerland) Yannick Schwaller 🔨	1	0	1	0	1	0	2	0	1	6

Sheet B	1	2	3	4	5	6	7	8	Final
(Norway) Magnus Ramsfjell 🔨	3	0	1	0	0	2	0	1	7
(Netherlands) Wouter Gösgens	0	2	0	2	0	0	2	0	6

Sheet C	1	2	3	4	5	6	7	8	Final
(Alberta) Brendan Bottcher 🔨	0	0	1	0	0	0	X	X	1
(Manitoba) Matt Dunstone	0	0	0	3	1	3	X	X	7

Sheet D	1	2	3	4	5	6	7	8	Final
(United States) Team Dropkin 🔨	1	0	1	1	0	1	0	0	4
(Alberta) Aaron Sluchinski	0	1	0	0	2	0	0	2	5

===== Draw 11 =====
Thursday, October 19, 3:30 pm

Sheet A	1	2	3	4	5	6	7	8	9	Final
(Scotland) Bruce Mouat 🔨	0	1	0	0	1	0	0	2	0	4
(Alberta) Kevin Koe	0	0	1	0	0	2	1	0	1	5

Sheet B	1	2	3	4	5	6	7	8	9	Final
(Scotland) Ross Whyte	0	1	0	0	3	0	2	0	2	8
(Japan) Riku Yanagisawa 🔨	2	0	0	1	0	1	0	2	0	6

Sheet C	1	2	3	4	5	6	7	8	Final
(Italy) Joël Retornaz 🔨	4	0	2	2	0	X	X	X	8
(Sweden) Niklas Edin	0	1	0	0	1	X	X	X	2

Sheet D	1	2	3	4	5	6	7	8	Final
(Manitoba) Reid Carruthers 🔨	2	0	0	0	0	1	3	X	6
(United States) John Shuster	0	0	1	1	0	0	0	X	2

===== Draw 14 =====
Friday, October 20, 11:30 am

Sheet A	1	2	3	4	5	6	7	8	Final
(Manitoba) Matt Dunstone 🔨	0	0	0	1	1	2	0	X	4
(Alberta) Aaron Sluchinski	0	0	1	0	0	0	1	X	2

Sheet B	1	2	3	4	5	6	7	8	Final
(Alberta) Brendan Bottcher	0	3	0	0	2	3	X	X	8
(United States) Team Dropkin 🔨	1	0	1	0	0	0	X	X	2

Sheet C	1	2	3	4	5	6	7	8	Final
(Newfoundland and Labrador) Brad Gushue 🔨	0	3	2	0	1	0	1	X	7
(Norway) Magnus Ramsfjell	0	0	0	2	0	1	0	X	3

Sheet D	1	2	3	4	5	6	7	8	Final
(Switzerland) Yannick Schwaller 🔨	2	2	0	2	0	2	X	X	8
(Netherlands) Wouter Gösgens	0	0	1	0	1	0	X	X	2

===== Draw 16 =====
Friday, October 20, 7:30 pm

Sheet A	1	2	3	4	5	6	7	8	Final
(Scotland) Ross Whyte 🔨	0	0	0	0	0	0	3	0	3
(Manitoba) Reid Carruthers	0	0	0	0	1	2	0	1	4

Sheet B	1	2	3	4	5	6	7	8	Final
(Sweden) Niklas Edin 🔨	0	2	0	2	4	0	1	X	9
(Alberta) Kevin Koe	0	0	2	0	0	2	0	X	4

Sheet C	1	2	3	4	5	6	7	8	Final
(United States) John Shuster	1	0	0	2	0	1	0	0	4
(Japan) Riku Yanagisawa 🔨	0	0	0	0	0	0	2	1	3

Sheet D	1	2	3	4	5	6	7	8	Final
(Scotland) Bruce Mouat 🔨	2	1	0	0	2	0	0	1	6
(Italy) Joël Retornaz	0	0	2	0	0	2	0	0	4

==== Playoffs ====
Quarterfinals
1	(Italy) Joël Retornaz	6
8	(Sweden) Niklas Edin	2
4	(Scotland) Ross Whyte	8
5	(Manitoba) Matt Dunstone	3
2	(Newfoundland and Labrador) Brad Gushue	7
7	(Manitoba) Reid Carruthers	2
3	(Switzerland) Yannick Schwaller	3
6	(Alberta) Brendan Bottcher	5

Semifinals
1	(Italy) Joël Retornaz	6
4	(Scotland) Ross Whyte	3
2	(Newfoundland and Labrador) Brad Gushue	3
6	(Alberta) Brendan Bottcher	6

Final
1	(Italy) Joël Retornaz	4
6	(Alberta) Brendan Bottcher	3

===== Quarterfinals =====
Saturday, October 21, 3:30 pm

Sheet A	1	2	3	4	5	6	7	8	Final
(Italy) Joël Retornaz 🔨	1	0	0	3	0	2	X	X	6
(Sweden) Niklas Edin	0	1	0	0	1	0	X	X	2

Player percentages
(Italy) Team Retornaz		(Sweden) Team Edin	
Mattia Giovanella	77%	Christoffer Sundgren	89%
Sebastiano Arman	88%	Rasmus Wranå	59%
Amos Mosaner	96%	Oskar Eriksson	55%
Joël Retornaz	93%	Niklas Edin	67%
Total	88%	Total	68%

Sheet B	1	2	3	4	5	6	7	8	Final
(Scotland) Ross Whyte 🔨	0	0	2	0	4	0	2	X	8
(Manitoba) Matt Dunstone	0	0	0	2	0	1	0	X	3

Player percentages
(Scotland) Team Whyte		(Manitoba) Team Dunstone	
Euan Kyle	80%	Ryan Harnden	93%
Duncan McFadzean	80%	Colton Lott	95%
Robin Brydone	88%	B. J. Neufeld	93%
Ross Whyte	91%	Matt Dunstone	80%
Total	85%	Total	90%

Sheet C	1	2	3	4	5	6	7	8	Final
(Switzerland) Yannick Schwaller 🔨	1	0	1	1	0	0	0	0	3
(Alberta) Brendan Bottcher	0	1	0	0	2	1	0	1	5

Player percentages
(Switzerland) Team Schwaller		(Alberta) Team Bottcher	
Pablo Lachat	89%	Ben Hebert	98%
Sven Michel	91%	Brett Gallant	95%
Yannick Schwaller	73%	Marc Kennedy	91%
Benoît Schwarz-van Berkel	73%	Brendan Bottcher	80%
Total	82%	Total	91%

Sheet D	1	2	3	4	5	6	7	8	Final
(Newfoundland and Labrador) Brad Gushue 🔨	2	0	0	2	1	2	X	X	7
(Manitoba) Reid Carruthers	0	2	0	0	0	0	X	X	2

Player percentages
(Newfoundland and Labrador) Team Gushue		(Manitoba) Team Carruthers	
Geoff Walker	96%	Connor Njegovan	96%
E. J. Harnden	79%	Derek Samagalski	96%
Mark Nichols	83%	Brad Jacobs	98%
Brad Gushue	98%	Reid Carruthers	67%
Total	89%	Total	89%

===== Semifinals =====
Saturday, October 21, 7:30 pm

Sheet B	1	2	3	4	5	6	7	8	Final
(Newfoundland and Labrador) Brad Gushue 🔨	0	0	1	0	1	0	1	0	3
(Alberta) Brendan Bottcher	0	1	0	2	0	2	0	1	6

Player percentages
(Newfoundland and Labrador) Team Gushue		(Alberta) Team Bottcher	
Geoff Walker	92%	Ben Hebert	98%
E. J. Harnden	89%	Brett Gallant	84%
Mark Nichols	78%	Marc Kennedy	94%
Brad Gushue	80%	Brendan Bottcher	94%
Total	85%	Total	93%

Sheet D	1	2	3	4	5	6	7	8	Final
(Italy) Joël Retornaz 🔨	0	2	0	0	1	0	3	X	6
(Scotland) Ross Whyte	0	0	0	1	0	2	0	X	3

Player percentages
(Italy) Team Retornaz		(Scotland) Team Whyte	
Mattia Giovanella	97%	Euan Kyle	94%
Sebastiano Arman	78%	Duncan McFadzean	78%
Amos Mosaner	91%	Robin Brydone	84%
Joël Retornaz	88%	Ross Whyte	88%
Total	88%	Total	86%

===== Final =====
Sunday, October 22, 3:00 pm

Sheet C	1	2	3	4	5	6	7	8	9	Final
(Italy) Joël Retornaz 🔨	1	0	0	0	1	0	1	0	1	4
(Alberta) Brendan Bottcher	0	0	0	1	0	0	0	2	0	3

Player percentages
(Italy) Team Retornaz		(Alberta) Team Bottcher	
Mattia Giovanella	97%	Ben Hebert	89%
Sebastiano Arman	88%	Brett Gallant	76%
Amos Mosaner	97%	Marc Kennedy	93%
Joël Retornaz	93%	Brendan Bottcher	87%
Total	94%	Total	87%

=== Tier 2 ===
==== Teams ====
The teams are listed as follows:

Skip	Third	Second	Lead	Alternate	Locale
Michael Brunner	Anthony Petoud	Romano Meier	Andreas Gerlach		Bern, Switzerland
Cameron Bryce	Duncan Menzies	Luke Carson	Robin McCall		Kelso, Scotland
Daniel Casper	Luc Violette	Ben Richardson	Chase Sinnett		(United States) Chaska, Minnesota
James Craik	Mark Watt	Angus Bryce	Blair Haswell		Forfar, Scotland
John Epping	Mat Camm	Pat Janssen	Jason Camm		Toronto, Ontario
Marco Hösli	Philipp Hösli	Simon Gloor	Justin Hausherr		Glarus, Switzerland
Lukas Høstmælingen	Grunde Buraas	Magnus Lillebø	Tinius Haslev Nordbye		Oslo, Norway
Jeong Byeong-jin	Kim Min-woo	Lee Jeong-jae	Kim Tae-hwan		Seoul, South Korea
Rylan Kleiter	Joshua Mattern	Matthew Hall	Trevor Johnson		Saskatoon, Saskatchewan
Mike McEwen	Colton Flasch	Kevin Marsh	Dan Marsh		Saskatoon, Saskatchewan
Sam Mooibroek	Scott Mitchell	Nathan Steele	Colin Schnurr	Wyatt Small	Whitby, Ontario
Yusuke Morozumi	Yuta Matsumura	Ryotaro Shukuya	Masaki Iwai	Kosuke Morozumi	Karuizawa, Japan
Fredrik Nyman	Patric Mabergs	Simon Olofsson	Johannes Patz		Sollefteå, Sweden
Catlin Schneider	Sterling Middleton	Jason Ginter	Alex Horvath		Victoria, British Columbia
Karsten Sturmay	Kyle Doering	Glenn Venance	Kurtis Goller	J. D. Lind	St. Albert, Alberta
Ryan Wiebe	Ty Dilello	Sean Flatt	Adam Flatt		Winnipeg, Manitoba

==== Round robin standings ====
Final Round Robin Standings

Key
Teams to Playoffs

Pool A	W	L	PF	PA
(Saskatchewan) Rylan Kleiter	2	2	23	25
(Scotland) Cameron Bryce	2	2	26	23
(Switzerland) Marco Hösli	1	3	13	20
(British Columbia) Catlin Schneider	1	3	18	20

Pool D	W	L	PF	PA
(Manitoba) Ryan Wiebe	3	1	22	16
(Saskatchewan) Mike McEwen	3	1	24	17
(Japan) Yusuke Morozumi	2	2	23	24
(United States) Daniel Casper	2	2	19	23

Pool B	W	L	PF	PA
(South Korea) Jeong Byeong-jin	4	0	24	15
(Alberta) Karsten Sturmay	3	1	22	13
(Norway) Lukas Høstmælingen	2	2	21	19
(Ontario) John Epping	2	2	21	17

Pool C	W	L	PF	PA
(Scotland) James Craik	3	1	25	15
(Ontario) Sam Mooibroek	1	3	17	25
(Switzerland) Michael Brunner	1	3	10	21
(Sweden) Fredrik Nyman	0	4	12	27

==== Round robin results ====
All draw times are listed in Eastern Time (UTC−04:00).

===== Draw 1 =====
Tuesday, October 17, 8:30 am

Sheet A	1	2	3	4	5	6	7	8	Final
(Switzerland) Michael Brunner	0	0	0	0	1	0	X	X	1
(South Korea) Jeong Byeong-jin 🔨	0	1	1	1	0	3	X	X	6

Sheet B	1	2	3	4	5	6	7	8	Final
(Alberta) Karsten Sturmay 🔨	2	1	0	0	1	0	1	1	6
(Sweden) Fredrik Nyman	0	0	2	0	0	2	0	0	4

Sheet C	1	2	3	4	5	6	7	8	Final
(Scotland) James Craik	0	2	0	2	0	1	0	1	6
(Norway) Lukas Høstmælingen 🔨	1	0	2	0	1	0	0	0	4

Sheet D	1	2	3	4	5	6	7	8	Final
(Ontario) John Epping	0	1	0	1	1	0	1	X	4
(Ontario) Sam Mooibroek 🔨	2	0	2	0	0	1	0	X	5

===== Draw 3 =====
Tuesday, October 17, 3:30 pm

Sheet A	1	2	3	4	5	6	7	8	Final
(Saskatchewan) Mike McEwen	0	2	0	0	0	1	2	2	7
(Saskatchewan) Rylan Kleiter 🔨	2	0	1	0	1	0	0	0	4

Sheet B	1	2	3	4	5	6	7	8	Final
(Scotland) Cameron Bryce	1	3	0	1	0	0	0	3	8
(Japan) Yusuke Morozumi 🔨	0	0	1	0	1	1	1	0	4

Sheet C	1	2	3	4	5	6	7	8	Final
(Manitoba) Ryan Wiebe	1	0	0	0	2	1	1	X	5
(British Columbia) Catlin Schneider 🔨	0	0	1	0	0	0	0	X	1

Sheet D	1	2	3	4	5	6	7	8	Final
(Switzerland) Marco Hösli 🔨	1	0	1	0	0	0	1	X	3
(United States) Daniel Casper	0	1	0	1	1	1	0	X	4

===== Draw 6 =====
Wednesday, October 18, 12:00 pm

Sheet A	1	2	3	4	5	6	7	8	Final
(Scotland) James Craik 🔨	2	0	3	0	4	X	X	X	9
(Ontario) John Epping	0	2	0	1	0	X	X	X	3

Sheet B	1	2	3	4	5	6	7	8	Final
(Norway) Lukas Høstmælingen	0	3	0	2	0	0	2	0	7
(Ontario) Sam Mooibroek 🔨	2	0	1	0	1	1	0	1	6

Sheet C	1	2	3	4	5	6	7	8	Final
(Alberta) Karsten Sturmay	0	0	3	1	0	1	1	X	6
(Switzerland) Michael Brunner 🔨	0	1	0	0	1	0	0	X	2

Sheet D	1	2	3	4	5	6	7	8	9	Final
(Sweden) Fredrik Nyman	0	0	1	2	0	2	0	0	0	5
(South Korea) Jeong Byeong-jin 🔨	0	2	0	0	1	0	1	1	1	6

===== Draw 8 =====
Wednesday, October 18, 8:00 pm

Sheet A	1	2	3	4	5	6	7	8	Final
(Switzerland) Marco Hösli	0	0	2	0	0	X	X	X	2
(Japan) Yusuke Morozumi 🔨	0	1	0	4	3	X	X	X	8

Sheet B	1	2	3	4	5	6	7	8	Final
(Saskatchewan) Mike McEwen	0	1	0	2	1	0	1	X	5
(British Columbia) Catlin Schneider 🔨	1	0	1	0	0	1	0	X	3

Sheet C	1	2	3	4	5	6	7	8	Final
(Scotland) Cameron Bryce	0	2	0	2	2	1	X	X	7
(United States) Daniel Casper 🔨	1	0	1	0	0	0	X	X	2

Sheet D	1	2	3	4	5	6	7	8	Final
(Manitoba) Ryan Wiebe	0	1	1	0	2	0	0	X	4
(Saskatchewan) Rylan Kleiter 🔨	2	0	0	2	0	2	0	X	6

===== Draw 10 =====
Thursday, October 19, 12:00 pm

Sheet A	1	2	3	4	5	6	7	8	Final
(United States) Daniel Casper 🔨	1	0	0	3	0	1	0	1	6
(British Columbia) Catlin Schneider	0	1	2	0	1	0	1	0	5

Sheet B	1	2	3	4	5	6	7	8	Final
(Switzerland) Marco Hösli 🔨	0	1	0	0	0	2	0	0	3
(Manitoba) Ryan Wiebe	0	0	0	0	2	0	2	1	5

Sheet C	1	2	3	4	5	6	7	8	Final
(Japan) Yusuke Morozumi	0	3	1	2	0	0	0	1	7
(Saskatchewan) Rylan Kleiter 🔨	2	0	0	0	2	1	0	0	5

Sheet D	1	2	3	4	5	6	7	8	Final
(Scotland) Cameron Bryce	1	0	0	1	0	3	0	0	5
(Saskatchewan) Mike McEwen 🔨	0	2	2	0	2	0	1	2	9

===== Draw 12 =====
Thursday, October 19, 8:00 pm

Sheet A	1	2	3	4	5	6	7	8	Final
(Alberta) Karsten Sturmay 🔨	2	0	2	2	1	X	X	X	7
(Ontario) Sam Mooibroek	0	1	0	0	0	X	X	X	1

Sheet B	1	2	3	4	5	6	7	8	9	Final
(Scotland) James Craik	1	0	0	0	1	0	2	0	0	4
(South Korea) Jeong Byeong-jin 🔨	0	0	0	3	0	1	0	0	1	5

Sheet C	1	2	3	4	5	6	7	8	Final
(Ontario) John Epping 🔨	2	0	4	1	2	X	X	X	9
(Sweden) Fredrik Nyman	0	1	0	0	0	X	X	X	1

Sheet D	1	2	3	4	5	6	7	8	9	Final
(Switzerland) Michael Brunner 🔨	2	0	0	0	1	1	0	0	1	5
(Norway) Lukas Høstmælingen	0	1	0	1	0	0	1	1	0	4

===== Draw 13 =====
Friday, October 20, 8:30 am

Sheet A	1	2	3	4	5	6	7	8	Final
(Scotland) Cameron Bryce	0	1	0	3	0	0	2	X	6
(Manitoba) Ryan Wiebe 🔨	2	0	2	0	3	1	0	X	8

Sheet B	1	2	3	4	5	6	7	8	9	Final
(United States) Daniel Casper 🔨	2	0	1	0	2	0	2	0	0	7
(Saskatchewan) Rylan Kleiter	0	1	0	1	0	2	0	3	1	8

Sheet C	1	2	3	4	5	6	7	8	Final
(Saskatchewan) Mike McEwen	0	1	0	1	0	0	1	X	3
(Switzerland) Marco Hösli 🔨	0	0	2	0	2	1	0	X	5

Sheet D	1	2	3	4	5	6	7	8	Final
(British Columbia) Catlin Schneider 🔨	3	1	0	3	0	2	X	X	9
(Japan) Yusuke Morozumi	0	0	2	0	2	0	X	X	4

===== Draw 15 =====
Friday, October 20, 4:00 pm

Sheet A	1	2	3	4	5	6	7	8	Final
(Sweden) Fredrik Nyman 🔨	0	1	0	0	1	0	0	X	2
(Norway) Lukas Høstmælingen	1	0	0	2	0	1	2	X	6

Sheet B	1	2	3	4	5	6	7	8	Final
(Ontario) John Epping 🔨	0	0	2	0	2	0	1	X	5
(Switzerland) Michael Brunner	0	0	0	1	0	1	0	X	2

Sheet C	1	2	3	4	5	6	7	8	Final
(Ontario) Sam Mooibroek 🔨	2	0	0	2	0	1	0	0	5
(South Korea) Jeong Byeong-jin	0	2	1	0	1	0	2	1	7

Sheet D	1	2	3	4	5	6	7	8	Final
(Alberta) Karsten Sturmay 🔨	1	0	1	0	0	1	0	X	3
(Scotland) James Craik	0	2	0	1	1	0	2	X	6

==== Playoffs ====
Quarterfinals
1	(South Korea) Jeong Byeong-jin	4
8	(United States) Daniel Casper	7
4	(Scotland) James Craik	3
5	(Saskatchewan) Mike McEwen	5
2	(Manitoba) Ryan Wiebe	5
7	(Japan) Yusuke Morozumi	9
3	(Alberta) Karsten Sturmay	6
6	(Saskatchewan) Rylan Kleiter	2

Semifinals
8	(United States) Daniel Casper	8
5	(Saskatchewan) Mike McEwen	3
7	(Japan) Yusuke Morozumi	7
3	(Alberta) Karsten Sturmay	4

Final
8	(United States) Daniel Casper	6
7	(Japan) Yusuke Morozumi	2

===== Quarterfinals =====
Saturday, October 21, 4:00 pm

Sheet A	1	2	3	4	5	6	7	8	Final
(Alberta) Karsten Sturmay 🔨	0	0	4	1	0	0	1	X	6
(Saskatchewan) Rylan Kleiter	0	0	0	0	1	1	0	X	2

Player percentages
(Alberta) Team Sturmay		(Saskatchewan) Team Kleiter	
Kurtis Goller	98%	Trevor Johnson	100%
Glenn Venance	77%	Matthew Hall	80%
Kyle Doering	100%	Joshua Mattern	79%
Karsten Sturmay	79%	Rylan Kleiter	68%
Total	89%	Total	82%

Sheet B	1	2	3	4	5	6	7	8	Final
(Scotland) James Craik	0	0	0	0	1	0	2	0	3
(Saskatchewan) Mike McEwen 🔨	0	0	0	1	0	2	0	2	5

Player percentages
(Scotland) Team Craik		(Saskatchewan) Team McEwen	
Blair Haswell	92%	Dan Marsh	92%
Angus Bryce	83%	Kevin Marsh	84%
Mark Watt	69%	Colton Flasch	78%
James Craik	78%	Mike McEwen	79%
Total	80%	Total	83%

Sheet C	1	2	3	4	5	6	7	8	Final
(Manitoba) Ryan Wiebe 🔨	0	1	0	1	0	1	2	0	5
(Japan) Yusuke Morozumi	1	0	2	0	3	0	0	3	9

Player percentages
(Manitoba) Team Wiebe		(Japan) Team Morozumi	
Adam Flatt	92%	Masaki Iwai	88%
Sean Flatt	97%	Ryotaro Shukuya	95%
Ty Dilello	83%	Yuta Matsumura	91%
Ryan Wiebe	80%	Yusuke Morozumi	77%
Total	88%	Total	88%

Sheet D	1	2	3	4	5	6	7	8	Final
(South Korea) Jeong Byeong-jin 🔨	1	0	2	0	0	0	1	X	4
(United States) Daniel Casper	0	2	0	3	1	1	0	X	7

Player percentages
(South Korea) Team Jeong		(United States) Team Casper	
Kim Tae-hwan	79%	Chase Sinnett	100%
Lee Jeong-jae	71%	Ben Richardson	84%
Kim Min-woo	71%	Luc Violette	86%
Jeong Byeong-jin	79%	Daniel Casper	95%
Total	75%	Total	91%

===== Semifinals =====
Saturday, October 21, 8:00 pm

Sheet B	1	2	3	4	5	6	7	8	Final
(Japan) Yusuke Morozumi	1	0	3	0	0	0	3	X	7
(Alberta) Karsten Sturmay 🔨	0	1	0	3	0	0	0	X	4

Player percentages
(Japan) Team Morozumi		(Alberta) Team Sturmay	
Masaki Iwai	97%	Kurtis Goller	97%
Ryotaro Shukuya	92%	Glenn Venance	92%
Yuta Matsumura	97%	Kyle Doering	91%
Yusuke Morozumi	82%	Karsten Sturmay	65%
Total	92%	Total	87%

Sheet C	1	2	3	4	5	6	7	8	Final
(United States) Daniel Casper	1	0	1	0	3	1	2	X	8
(Saskatchewan) Mike McEwen 🔨	0	2	0	1	0	0	0	X	3

Player percentages
(United States) Team Casper		(Saskatchewan) Team McEwen	
Chase Sinnett	88%	Dan Marsh	93%
Ben Richardson	91%	Kevin Marsh	84%
Luc Violette	86%	Colton Flasch	82%
Daniel Casper	93%	Mike McEwen	54%
Total	89%	Total	78%

===== Final =====
Sunday, October 22, 3:00 pm

Sheet A	1	2	3	4	5	6	7	8	Final
(United States) Daniel Casper	0	0	2	0	1	1	2	X	6
(Japan) Yusuke Morozumi 🔨	1	0	0	1	0	0	0	X	2

Player percentages
(United States) Team Casper		(Japan) Team Morozumi	
Chase Sinnett	86%	Masaki Iwai	82%
Ben Richardson	77%	Ryotaro Shukuya	70%
Luc Violette	100%	Yuta Matsumura	73%
Daniel Casper	91%	Yusuke Morozumi	70%
Total	88%	Total	74%

== Women ==
=== Tier 1 ===
==== Teams ====
The teams are listed as follows:

Skip	Third	Second	Lead	Alternate	Locale
Kate Cameron	Meghan Walter	Taylor McDonald	Mackenzie Elias		Winnipeg, Manitoba
Stefania Constantini	Elena Mathis	Angela Romei	Giulia Zardini Lacedelli	Marta Lo Deserto	Cortina d'Ampezzo, Italy
Kerri Einarson	Val Sweeting	Shannon Birchard	Briane Harris		Gimli, Manitoba
Satsuki Fujisawa	Chinami Yoshida	Yumi Suzuki (Note: Team Fujisawa played with three players for most of the tournament as second Yumi Suzuki was recovering from a back injury. Suzuki played in two games.)	Yurika Yoshida		Kitami, Japan
Gim Eun-ji	Kim Min-ji	Kim Su-ji	Seol Ye-eun	Seol Ye-ji	Uijeongbu, South Korea
Clancy Grandy	Kayla MacMillan	Lindsay Dubue	Rachelle Brown (Note: Rachelle Brown spared for Sarah Loken.)		Vancouver, British Columbia
Ha Seung-youn	Kim Hye-rin	Yang Tae-i	Kim Su-jin		Chuncheon, South Korea
Anna Hasselborg	Sara McManus	Agnes Knochenhauer	Sofia Mabergs		Sundbyberg, Sweden
Rachel Homan	Tracy Fleury	Emma Miskew	Sarah Wilkes		Ottawa, Ontario
Jennifer Jones	Karlee Burgess	Emily Zacharias	Lauren Lenentine		Winnipeg, Manitoba
Kaitlyn Lawes	Selena Njegovan	Jocelyn Peterman	Kristin MacCuish		Winnipeg, Manitoba
Rebecca Morrison	Gina Aitken	Sophie Sinclair	Sophie Jackson	Jennifer Dodds	Stirling, Scotland
Tabitha Peterson	Cory Thiesse	Becca Hamilton	Tara Peterson		(United States) St. Paul, Minnesota
Kristin Skaslien (Fourth)	Marianne Rørvik (Skip)	Mille Haslev Nordbye	Martine Rønning		Lillehammer, Norway
Alina Pätz (Fourth)	Silvana Tirinzoni (Skip)	Selina Witschonke	Carole Howald		Aarau, Switzerland
Isabella Wranå	Almida de Val	Maria Larsson	Linda Stenlund		Sundbyberg, Sweden

==== Round robin standings ====
Final Round Robin Standings

Key
Teams to Playoffs

Pool A	W	L	PF	PA	SO
(South Korea) Gim Eun-ji	4	0	28	13	1
(Switzerland) Silvana Tirinzoni	4	0	23	12	6
(Scotland) Rebecca Morrison	2	2	21	19	8
(Manitoba) Kaitlyn Lawes	2	2	23	25	11

Pool D	W	L	PF	PA	SO
(United States) Tabitha Peterson	1	3	18	21	2
(Japan) Satsuki Fujisawa	1	3	13	19	3
(Norway) Marianne Rørvik	1	3	22	27	7
(Sweden) Isabella Wranå	1	3	16	28	9

Pool B	W	L	PF	PA	SO
(Italy) Stefania Constantini	3	1	24	25	4
(Manitoba) Kerri Einarson	3	1	24	19	15
(Manitoba) Jennifer Jones	2	2	21	20	10
(British Columbia) Clancy Grandy	0	4	15	25	14

Pool C	W	L	PF	PA	SO
(Sweden) Anna Hasselborg	4	0	26	18	13
(Ontario) Rachel Homan	2	2	22	22	12
(South Korea) Ha Seung-youn	1	3	21	23	5
(Manitoba) Kate Cameron	1	3	20	21	16

==== Round robin results ====
All draw times are listed in Eastern Time (UTC−04:00).

===== Draw 1 =====
Tuesday, October 17, 8:00 am

Sheet A	1	2	3	4	5	6	7	8	Final
(Sweden) Anna Hasselborg	0	0	0	2	3	0	0	3	8
(Italy) Stefania Constantini 🔨	0	1	1	0	0	2	0	0	4

Sheet B	1	2	3	4	5	6	7	8	Final
(Manitoba) Kerri Einarson 🔨	0	2	0	0	1	0	2	X	5
(Manitoba) Kate Cameron	0	0	0	1	0	2	0	X	3

Sheet C	1	2	3	4	5	6	7	8	Final
(Ontario) Rachel Homan 🔨	0	2	1	0	0	0	0	1	4
(British Columbia) Clancy Grandy	0	0	0	0	1	1	1	0	3

Sheet D	1	2	3	4	5	6	7	8	Final
(Manitoba) Jennifer Jones	0	0	1	0	0	3	0	2	6
(South Korea) Ha Seung-youn 🔨	1	0	0	1	1	0	2	0	5

===== Draw 3 =====
Tuesday, October 17, 3:00 pm

Sheet A	1	2	3	4	5	6	7	8	Final
(Japan) Satsuki Fujisawa	0	0	0	1	0	0	X	X	1
(Scotland) Rebecca Morrison 🔨	0	3	0	0	1	3	X	X	7

Sheet B	1	2	3	4	5	6	7	8	Final
(Switzerland) Silvana Tirinzoni 🔨	1	0	3	0	1	1	0	0	6
(Norway) Marianne Rørvik	0	1	0	1	0	0	2	1	5

Sheet C	1	2	3	4	5	6	7	8	9	Final
(Sweden) Isabella Wranå	0	3	0	2	0	0	2	0	1	8
(Manitoba) Kaitlyn Lawes 🔨	2	0	1	0	2	1	0	1	0	7

Sheet D	1	2	3	4	5	6	7	8	Final
(South Korea) Gim Eun-ji 🔨	2	0	0	0	2	0	2	1	7
(United States) Tabitha Peterson	0	0	1	0	0	3	0	0	4

===== Draw 6 =====
Wednesday, October 18, 11:30 am

Sheet A	1	2	3	4	5	6	7	8	9	Final
(Ontario) Rachel Homan 🔨	1	0	1	0	1	0	0	1	2	6
(Manitoba) Jennifer Jones	0	1	0	0	0	2	1	0	0	4

Sheet B	1	2	3	4	5	6	7	8	Final
(British Columbia) Clancy Grandy 🔨	1	0	2	0	0	0	2	X	5
(South Korea) Ha Seung-youn	0	5	0	1	0	1	0	X	7

Sheet C	1	2	3	4	5	6	7	8	9	Final
(Manitoba) Kerri Einarson 🔨	0	1	0	0	0	3	0	1	0	5
(Sweden) Anna Hasselborg	2	0	1	1	0	0	1	0	1	6

Sheet D	1	2	3	4	5	6	7	8	9	Final
(Manitoba) Kate Cameron	2	0	1	0	0	3	0	0	0	6
(Italy) Stefania Constantini 🔨	0	1	0	1	1	0	2	1	1	7

===== Draw 8 =====
Wednesday, October 18, 7:30 pm

Sheet A	1	2	3	4	5	6	7	8	Final
(South Korea) Gim Eun-ji	0	2	0	2	1	1	0	1	7
(Norway) Marianne Rørvik 🔨	2	0	1	0	0	0	1	0	4

Sheet B	1	2	3	4	5	6	7	8	Final
(Japan) Satsuki Fujisawa	1	2	0	0	2	1	2	X	8
(Manitoba) Kaitlyn Lawes 🔨	0	0	1	1	0	0	0	X	2

Sheet C	1	2	3	4	5	6	7	8	Final
(Switzerland) Silvana Tirinzoni	1	1	0	0	1	0	0	2	5
(United States) Tabitha Peterson 🔨	0	0	1	1	0	1	1	0	4

Sheet D	1	2	3	4	5	6	7	8	Final
(Sweden) Isabella Wranå	1	0	1	0	0	0	2	0	4
(Scotland) Rebecca Morrison 🔨	0	2	0	0	1	0	0	2	5

===== Draw 10 =====
Thursday, October 19, 11:30 am

Sheet A	1	2	3	4	5	6	7	8	Final
(United States) Tabitha Peterson	1	0	1	0	0	1	0	X	3
(Manitoba) Kaitlyn Lawes 🔨	0	2	0	1	1	0	2	X	6

Sheet B	1	2	3	4	5	6	7	8	Final
(South Korea) Gim Eun-ji	1	0	1	0	0	0	3	3	8
(Sweden) Isabella Wranå 🔨	0	2	0	0	1	0	0	0	3

Sheet C	1	2	3	4	5	6	7	8	Final
(Norway) Marianne Rørvik	0	1	1	0	2	0	0	3	7
(Scotland) Rebecca Morrison 🔨	2	0	0	2	0	1	1	0	6

Sheet D	1	2	3	4	5	6	7	8	Final
(Switzerland) Silvana Tirinzoni	1	1	0	0	1	1	0	X	4
(Japan) Satsuki Fujisawa 🔨	0	0	0	1	0	0	1	X	2

===== Draw 12 =====
Thursday, October 19, 7:30 pm

Sheet A	1	2	3	4	5	6	7	8	Final
(Manitoba) Kerri Einarson	0	0	1	0	0	4	0	2	7
(South Korea) Ha Seung-youn 🔨	2	1	0	0	1	0	1	0	5

Sheet B	1	2	3	4	5	6	7	8	Final
(Ontario) Rachel Homan 🔨	0	0	2	0	0	0	5	0	7
(Italy) Stefania Constantini	0	2	0	3	1	1	0	1	8

Sheet C	1	2	3	4	5	6	7	8	Final
(Manitoba) Jennifer Jones 🔨	0	2	1	2	0	0	1	X	6
(Manitoba) Kate Cameron	0	0	0	0	1	1	0	X	2

Sheet D	1	2	3	4	5	6	7	8	Final
(Sweden) Anna Hasselborg 🔨	2	0	1	0	0	1	0	1	5
(British Columbia) Clancy Grandy	0	2	0	1	0	0	1	0	4

===== Draw 13 =====
Friday, October 20, 8:00 am

Sheet A	1	2	3	4	5	6	7	8	Final
(Switzerland) Silvana Tirinzoni 🔨	2	1	0	2	3	X	X	X	8
(Sweden) Isabella Wranå	0	0	1	0	0	X	X	X	1

Sheet B	1	2	3	4	5	6	7	8	Final
(United States) Tabitha Peterson	0	0	2	1	0	3	1	X	7
(Scotland) Rebecca Morrison 🔨	2	0	0	0	1	0	0	X	3

Sheet C	1	2	3	4	5	6	7	8	Final
(Japan) Satsuki Fujisawa	0	2	0	0	0	0	0	X	2
(South Korea) Gim Eun-ji 🔨	1	0	1	0	0	2	2	X	6

Sheet D	1	2	3	4	5	6	7	8	Final
(Manitoba) Kaitlyn Lawes 🔨	2	2	1	1	0	1	0	1	8
(Norway) Marianne Rørvik	0	0	0	0	5	0	1	0	6

===== Draw 15 =====
Friday, October 20, 3:30 pm

Sheet A	1	2	3	4	5	6	7	8	Final
(Manitoba) Kate Cameron 🔨	0	2	0	2	5	X	X	X	9
(British Columbia) Clancy Grandy	0	0	3	0	0	X	X	X	3

Sheet B	1	2	3	4	5	6	7	8	Final
(Manitoba) Jennifer Jones 🔨	0	1	0	2	0	2	0	X	5
(Sweden) Anna Hasselborg	2	0	3	0	1	0	1	X	7

Sheet C	1	2	3	4	5	6	7	8	9	Final
(South Korea) Ha Seung-youn	0	0	1	1	0	0	2	0	0	4
(Italy) Stefania Constantini 🔨	0	2	0	0	0	1	0	1	1	5

Sheet D	1	2	3	4	5	6	7	8	Final
(Manitoba) Kerri Einarson	1	4	1	1	0	0	0	X	7
(Ontario) Rachel Homan 🔨	0	0	0	0	3	1	1	X	5

==== Playoffs ====
Quarterfinals
1	(South Korea) Gim Eun-ji	4
8	(Manitoba) Kaitlyn Lawes	7
4	(Italy) Stefania Constantini	4
5	(Manitoba) Kerri Einarson	7
2	(Switzerland) Silvana Tirinzoni	4
7	(Manitoba) Jennifer Jones	7
3	(Sweden) Anna Hasselborg	8
6	(Scotland) Rebecca Morrison	5

Semifinals
8	(Manitoba) Kaitlyn Lawes	6
5	(Manitoba) Kerri Einarson	4
7	(Manitoba) Jennifer Jones	7
3	(Sweden) Anna Hasselborg	5

Final
8	(Manitoba) Kaitlyn Lawes	4
7	(Manitoba) Jennifer Jones	7

===== Quarterfinals =====
Saturday, October 21, 11:30 am

Sheet A	1	2	3	4	5	6	7	8	Final
(South Korea) Gim Eun-ji 🔨	1	0	1	0	0	2	0	0	4
(Manitoba) Kaitlyn Lawes	0	1	0	2	1	0	2	1	7

Player percentages
(South Korea) Team Gim		(Manitoba) Team Lawes	
Seol Ye-eun	88%	Kristin MacCuish	91%
Kim Su-ji	97%	Jocelyn Peterman	97%
Kim Min-ji	86%	Selena Njegovan	75%
Gim Eun-ji	86%	Kaitlyn Lawes	97%
Total	89%	Total	90%

Sheet B	1	2	3	4	5	6	7	8	Final
(Italy) Stefania Constantini	0	2	0	1	0	1	0	0	4
(Manitoba) Kerri Einarson 🔨	1	0	1	0	2	0	0	3	7

Player percentages
(Italy) Team Constantini		(Manitoba) Team Einarson	
Giulia Zardini Lacedelli	86%	Briane Harris	91%
Marta Lo Deserto	86%	Shannon Birchard	84%
Elena Mathis	77%	Val Sweeting	83%
Stefania Constantini	73%	Kerri Einarson	77%
Total	80%	Total	84%

Sheet C	1	2	3	4	5	6	7	8	Final
(Switzerland) Silvana Tirinzoni 🔨	1	0	1	0	2	0	0	0	4
(Manitoba) Jennifer Jones	0	2	0	1	0	2	0	2	7

Player percentages
(Switzerland) Team Tirinzoni		(Manitoba) Team Jones	
Carole Howald	92%	Lauren Lenentine	84%
Selina Witschonke	80%	Emily Zacharias	72%
Silvana Tirinzoni	69%	Karlee Burgess	86%
Alina Pätz	64%	Jennifer Jones	80%
Total	76%	Total	80%

Sheet D	1	2	3	4	5	6	7	8	Final
(Sweden) Anna Hasselborg 🔨	0	2	0	3	0	0	3	X	8
(Scotland) Rebecca Morrison	0	0	2	0	2	1	0	X	5

Player percentages
(Sweden) Team Hasselborg		(Scotland) Team Morrison	
Sofia Mabergs	86%	Sophie Jackson	97%
Agnes Knochenhauer	92%	Jennifer Dodds	88%
Sara McManus	94%	Gina Aitken	95%
Anna Hasselborg	93%	Rebecca Morrison	85%
Total	91%	Total	91%

===== Semifinals =====
Saturday, October 21, 7:30 pm

Sheet A	1	2	3	4	5	6	7	8	Final
(Manitoba) Jennifer Jones	0	0	0	0	3	3	0	1	7
(Sweden) Anna Hasselborg 🔨	1	1	1	0	0	0	2	0	5

Player percentages
(Manitoba) Team Jones		(Sweden) Team Hasselborg	
Lauren Lenentine	89%	Sofia Mabergs	89%
Emily Zacharias	80%	Agnes Knochenhauer	84%
Karlee Burgess	89%	Sara McManus	82%
Jennifer Jones	75%	Anna Hasselborg	77%
Total	83%	Total	83%

Sheet C	1	2	3	4	5	6	7	8	Final
(Manitoba) Kaitlyn Lawes	0	2	0	2	0	1	0	1	6
(Manitoba) Kerri Einarson 🔨	2	0	2	0	0	0	0	0	4

Player percentages
(Manitoba) Team Lawes		(Manitoba) Team Einarson	
Kristin MacCuish	73%	Briane Harris	85%
Jocelyn Peterman	72%	Shannon Birchard	92%
Selena Njegovan	70%	Val Sweeting	80%
Kaitlyn Lawes	92%	Kerri Einarson	77%
Total	77%	Total	83%

===== Final =====
Sunday, October 22, 10:30 am

Sheet C	1	2	3	4	5	6	7	8	Final
(Manitoba) Kaitlyn Lawes 🔨	1	0	0	2	0	1	0	X	4
(Manitoba) Jennifer Jones	0	3	1	0	2	0	1	X	7

Player percentages
(Manitoba) Team Lawes		(Manitoba) Team Jones	
Kristin MacCuish	83%	Lauren Lenentine	92%
Jocelyn Peterman	78%	Emily Zacharias	86%
Selena Njegovan	78%	Karlee Burgess	73%
Kaitlyn Lawes	78%	Jennifer Jones	88%
Total	79%	Total	85%

=== Tier 2 ===
==== Teams ====
The teams are listed as follows:

Skip	Third	Second	Lead	Alternate	Locale
Sarah Anderson	Taylor Anderson	Lexi Lanigan	Leah Yavarow		(United States) Minneapolis, Minnesota
Christina Black	Jenn Baxter	Karlee Everist	Shelley Barker		Dartmouth, Nova Scotia
Jolene Campbell	Abby Ackland	Rachel Erickson	Sara Oliver		Winnipeg, Manitoba
Madeleine Dupont	Mathilde Halse	Jasmin Lander	My Larsen	Denise Dupont	Hvidovre, Denmark
Serena Gray-Withers	Catherine Clifford	Brianna Cullen	Zoe Cinnamon	Gracelyn Richards	Edmonton, Alberta
Corrie Hürlimann	Celine Schwizgebel	Sarah Müller	Marina Lörtscher	Briar Schwaller-Hürlimann	Zug, Switzerland
Jessie Hunkin	Jessie Haughian	Robyn Silvernagle (Note: Robyn Silvernagle spared for Becca Hebert.)	Dayna Demmans		Spruce Grove, Alberta
Danielle Inglis	Kira Brunton	Calissa Daly	Cassandra de Groot		Ottawa, Ontario
Michèle Jäggi	Chelsea Carey (Note: Chelsea Carey spared for Team Jäggi who only had three players.)	Stefanie Berset	Lisa Muhmenthaler		Bern, Switzerland
Kim Eun-jung	Kim Kyeong-ae	Kim Cho-hi	Kim Seon-yeong	Kim Yeong-mi	Gangneung, South Korea
Ikue Kitazawa	Seina Nakajima	Minori Suzuki	Hasumi Ishigooka	Ami Enami	Nagano, Japan
Isabelle Ladouceur	Grace Lloyd	Jamie Smith	Rachel Steele		Whitby, Ontario
Nancy Martin	Lindsay Bertsch	Madison Kleiter	Krysten Karwacki		Martensville, Saskatchewan
Kayla Skrlik	Brittany Tran	Geri-Lynn Ramsay	Ashton Skrlik		Calgary, Alberta
Delaney Strouse	Anne O'Hara	Sydney Mullaney	Rebecca Rodgers	Susan Dudt	(United States) Traverse City, Michigan
Yuna Kotani (Note: As skip Sayaka Yoshimura was on maternity leave, the rest of the team moved up the lineup a position.)	Kaho Onodera	Anna Ohmiya	Mina Kobayashi		Sapporo, Japan

==== Round robin standings ====
Final Round Robin Standings

Key
Teams to Playoffs

Pool A	W	L	PF	PA
(Japan) Team Yoshimura	4	0	27	15
(United States) Sarah Anderson	2	2	21	18
(Nova Scotia) Christina Black	2	2	21	22
(Ontario) Danielle Inglis	2	2	19	21

Pool D	W	L	PF	PA
(Alberta) Kayla Skrlik	2	2	21	17
(Alberta) Jessie Hunkin	2	2	24	29
(United States) Delaney Strouse	2	2	16	20
(Switzerland) Michèle Jäggi	0	4	15	22

Pool B	W	L	PF	PA
(Denmark) Madeleine Dupont	3	1	21	16
(Switzerland) Corrie Hürlimann	2	2	16	25
(Ontario) Isabelle Ladouceur	1	3	17	23
(Saskatchewan) Nancy Martin	1	3	11	23

Pool C	W	L	PF	PA
(Japan) Ikue Kitazawa	3	1	26	15
(South Korea) Kim Eun-jung	3	1	27	14
(Manitoba) Jolene Campbell	2	2	19	18
(Alberta) Serena Gray-Withers	1	3	15	18

==== Round robin results ====
All draw times are listed in Eastern Time (UTC−04:00).

===== Draw 2 =====
Tuesday, October 17, 12:00 pm

Sheet A	1	2	3	4	5	6	7	8	Final
(United States) Delaney Strouse 🔨	0	0	0	0	0	3	0	1	4
(United States) Sarah Anderson	0	0	0	1	0	0	1	0	2

Sheet B	1	2	3	4	5	6	7	8	Final
(Nova Scotia) Christina Black 🔨	1	1	0	2	0	1	0	1	6
(Switzerland) Michèle Jäggi	0	0	2	0	2	0	1	0	5

Sheet C	1	2	3	4	5	6	7	8	Final
(Alberta) Kayla Skrlik 🔨	1	0	1	1	1	0	0	X	4
(Ontario) Danielle Inglis	0	1	0	0	0	2	0	X	3

Sheet D	1	2	3	4	5	6	7	8	9	Final
(Japan) Team Yoshimura	1	1	0	2	0	0	1	0	2	7
(Alberta) Jessie Hunkin 🔨	0	0	1	0	2	0	0	2	0	5

===== Draw 4 =====
Tuesday, October 17, 7:00 pm

Sheet A	1	2	3	4	5	6	7	8	Final
(Switzerland) Corrie Hürlimann 🔨	2	0	1	0	1	0	2	1	7
(Manitoba) Jolene Campbell	0	1	0	1	0	1	0	0	3

Sheet B	1	2	3	4	5	6	7	8	Final
(Japan) Ikue Kitazawa	0	1	0	0	0	1	0	X	2
(Saskatchewan) Nancy Martin 🔨	1	0	2	1	1	0	1	X	6

Sheet C	1	2	3	4	5	6	7	8	Final
(Ontario) Isabelle Ladouceur 🔨	3	0	1	1	1	0	1	X	7
(Alberta) Serena Gray-Withers	0	1	0	0	0	2	0	X	3

Sheet D	1	2	3	4	5	6	7	8	Final
(South Korea) Kim Eun-jung	0	0	3	0	1	0	0	0	4
(Denmark) Madeleine Dupont 🔨	0	1	0	2	0	3	1	1	8

===== Draw 5 =====
Wednesday, October 18, 8:30 am

Sheet A	1	2	3	4	5	6	7	8	Final
(Japan) Team Yoshimura 🔨	0	2	0	2	1	1	0	X	6
(Switzerland) Michèle Jäggi	2	0	1	0	0	0	1	X	4

Sheet B	1	2	3	4	5	6	7	8	Final
(United States) Delaney Strouse	0	1	0	2	0	0	1	1	5
(Ontario) Danielle Inglis 🔨	1	0	2	0	2	1	0	0	6

Sheet C	1	2	3	4	5	6	7	8	Final
(Nova Scotia) Christina Black 🔨	3	0	0	2	0	0	1	0	6
(Alberta) Jessie Hunkin	0	3	1	0	2	1	0	1	8

Sheet D	1	2	3	4	5	6	7	8	Final
(Alberta) Kayla Skrlik 🔨	6	0	3	0	0	X	X	X	9
(United States) Sarah Anderson	0	1	0	1	1	X	X	X	3

===== Draw 7 =====
Wednesday, October 18, 4:00 pm

Sheet A	1	2	3	4	5	6	7	8	Final
(Alberta) Serena Gray-Withers	0	1	0	0	0	2	0	X	3
(Denmark) Madeleine Dupont 🔨	1	0	1	1	1	0	1	X	5

Sheet B	1	2	3	4	5	6	7	8	Final
(Ontario) Isabelle Ladouceur	0	0	0	0	1	0	1	0	2
(South Korea) Kim Eun-jung 🔨	0	2	0	1	0	1	0	1	5

Sheet C	1	2	3	4	5	6	7	8	Final
(Saskatchewan) Nancy Martin	0	0	2	0	0	0	X	X	2
(Manitoba) Jolene Campbell 🔨	1	3	0	0	2	1	X	X	7

Sheet D	1	2	3	4	5	6	7	8	Final
(Switzerland) Corrie Hürlimann	0	0	0	2	0	0	X	X	2
(Japan) Ikue Kitazawa 🔨	0	2	1	0	2	4	X	X	9

===== Draw 9 =====
Thursday, October 19, 8:30 am

Sheet A	1	2	3	4	5	6	7	8	Final
(Japan) Ikue Kitazawa 🔨	2	0	2	0	2	0	2	X	8
(Ontario) Isabelle Ladouceur	0	2	0	1	0	1	0	X	4

Sheet B	1	2	3	4	5	6	7	8	Final
(Denmark) Madeleine Dupont 🔨	0	0	2	1	0	1	1	X	5
(Manitoba) Jolene Campbell	1	1	0	0	0	0	0	X	2

Sheet C	1	2	3	4	5	6	7	8	Final
(Switzerland) Corrie Hürlimann	0	0	1	0	0	2	0	X	3
(South Korea) Kim Eun-jung 🔨	0	2	0	3	1	0	4	X	10

Sheet D	1	2	3	4	5	6	7	8	Final
(Alberta) Serena Gray-Withers 🔨	0	1	1	1	1	0	2	X	6
(Saskatchewan) Nancy Martin	1	0	0	0	0	1	0	X	2

===== Draw 11 =====
Thursday, October 19, 4:00 pm

Sheet A	1	2	3	4	5	6	7	8	Final
(Nova Scotia) Christina Black	0	0	1	2	2	0	0	1	6
(Alberta) Kayla Skrlik 🔨	0	3	0	0	0	2	0	0	5

Sheet B	1	2	3	4	5	6	7	8	Final
(Alberta) Jessie Hunkin 🔨	1	0	1	0	0	0	X	X	2
(United States) Sarah Anderson	0	2	0	4	4	2	X	X	12

Sheet C	1	2	3	4	5	6	7	8	Final
(United States) Delaney Strouse 🔨	1	0	1	0	1	0	X	X	3
(Japan) Team Yoshimura	0	4	0	2	0	3	X	X	9

Sheet D	1	2	3	4	5	6	7	8	Final
(Ontario) Danielle Inglis 🔨	1	0	2	0	0	2	1	X	6
(Switzerland) Michèle Jäggi	0	1	0	1	1	0	0	X	3

===== Draw 14 =====
Friday, October 20, 12:00 pm

Sheet A	1	2	3	4	5	6	7	8	Final
(South Korea) Kim Eun-jung	0	1	1	0	3	3	X	X	8
(Saskatchewan) Nancy Martin 🔨	0	0	0	1	0	0	X	X	1

Sheet B	1	2	3	4	5	6	7	8	Final
(Switzerland) Corrie Hürlimann	0	0	1	1	0	1	1	0	4
(Alberta) Serena Gray-Withers 🔨	0	0	0	0	2	0	0	1	3

Sheet C	1	2	3	4	5	6	7	8	Final
(Japan) Ikue Kitazawa	0	2	0	3	1	0	1	X	7
(Denmark) Madeleine Dupont 🔨	0	0	2	0	0	1	0	X	3

Sheet D	1	2	3	4	5	6	7	8	Final
(Ontario) Isabelle Ladouceur	0	1	0	0	2	1	0	X	4
(Manitoba) Jolene Campbell 🔨	2	0	2	1	0	0	2	X	7

===== Draw 16 =====
Friday, October 20, 8:00 pm

Sheet A	1	2	3	4	5	6	7	8	Final
(Alberta) Jessie Hunkin 🔨	2	0	2	1	0	3	1	X	9
(Ontario) Danielle Inglis	0	2	0	0	2	0	0	X	4

Sheet B	1	2	3	4	5	6	7	8	Final
(Japan) Team Yoshimura 🔨	0	0	2	0	0	2	0	1	5
(Alberta) Kayla Skrlik	0	1	0	1	0	0	1	0	3

Sheet C	1	2	3	4	5	6	7	8	Final
(Switzerland) Michèle Jäggi	0	0	0	2	0	0	1	0	3
(United States) Sarah Anderson 🔨	0	1	0	0	0	1	0	2	4

Sheet D	1	2	3	4	5	6	7	8	Final
(Nova Scotia) Christina Black 🔨	0	1	0	0	1	1	0	X	3
(United States) Delaney Strouse	2	0	1	1	0	0	0	X	4

==== Playoffs ====
Quarterfinals
1	(Japan) Team Yoshimura	6
8	(Ontario) Danielle Inglis	7
4	(South Korea) Kim Eun-jung	5
5	(United States) Sarah Anderson	2
2	(Denmark) Madeleine Dupont	6
7	(Nova Scotia) Christina Black	5
3	(Japan) Ikue Kitazawa	6
6	(Manitoba) Jolene Campbell	7

Semifinals
8	(Ontario) Danielle Inglis	4
4	(South Korea) Kim Eun-jung	10
2	(Denmark) Madeleine Dupont	12
6	(Manitoba) Jolene Campbell	2

Final
4	(South Korea) Kim Eun-jung	7
2	(Denmark) Madeleine Dupont	4

===== Quarterfinals =====
Saturday, October 21, 12:00 pm

Sheet A	1	2	3	4	5	6	7	8	Final
(Japan) Ikue Kitazawa 🔨	2	0	1	0	1	0	2	0	6
(Manitoba) Jolene Campbell	0	3	0	0	0	2	0	2	7

Player percentages
(Japan) Team Kitazawa		(Manitoba) Team Campbell	
Hasumi Ishigooka	88%	Sara Oliver	88%
Minori Suzuki	78%	Rachel Erickson	83%
Seina Nakajima	89%	Abby Ackland	84%
Ikue Kitazawa	95%	Jolene Campbell	87%
Total	88%	Total	85%

Sheet B	1	2	3	4	5	6	7	8	Final
(Denmark) Madeleine Dupont 🔨	1	0	1	0	1	1	0	2	6
(Nova Scotia) Christina Black	0	3	0	1	0	0	1	0	5

Player percentages
(Denmark) Team Dupont		(Nova Scotia) Team Black	
My Larsen	86%	Shelley Barker	83%
Jasmin Lander	81%	Karlee Everist	56%
Mathilde Halse	73%	Jenn Baxter	70%
Madeleine Dupont	72%	Christina Black	70%
Total	78%	Total	70%

Sheet C	1	2	3	4	5	6	7	8	Final
(Japan) Team Yoshimura 🔨	2	1	0	1	0	0	2	0	6
(Ontario) Danielle Inglis	0	0	2	0	2	2	0	1	7

Player percentages
(Japan) Team Yoshimura		(Ontario) Team Inglis	
Mina Kobayashi	72%	Cassandra de Groot	67%
Anna Ohmiya	78%	Calissa Daly	81%
Kaho Onodera	81%	Kira Brunton	80%
Yuna Kotani	86%	Danielle Inglis	72%
Total	79%	Total	75%

Sheet D	1	2	3	4	5	6	7	8	Final
(South Korea) Kim Eun-jung 🔨	0	0	0	2	1	0	2	X	5
(United States) Sarah Anderson	0	0	1	0	0	1	0	X	2

Player percentages
(South Korea) Team Kim		(United States) Team Anderson	
Kim Seon-yeong	98%	Leah Yavarow	86%
Kim Cho-hi	89%	Lexi Lanigan	78%
Kim Kyeong-ae	86%	Taylor Anderson	97%
Kim Eun-jung	91%	Sarah Anderson	80%
Total	91%	Total	85%

===== Semifinals =====
Saturday, October 21, 8:00 pm

Sheet A	1	2	3	4	5	6	7	8	Final
(Ontario) Danielle Inglis	0	0	2	0	2	0	0	X	4
(South Korea) Kim Eun-jung 🔨	2	2	0	3	0	1	2	X	10

Player percentages
(Ontario) Team Inglis		(South Korea) Team Kim	
Cassandra de Groot	80%	Kim Seon-yeong	93%
Calissa Daly	73%	Kim Cho-hi	98%
Kira Brunton	75%	Kim Kyeong-ae	89%
Danielle Inglis	71%	Kim Eun-jung	91%
Total	75%	Total	93%

Sheet D	1	2	3	4	5	6	7	8	Final
(Denmark) Madeleine Dupont 🔨	2	0	5	0	5	X	X	X	12
(Manitoba) Jolene Campbell	0	1	0	1	0	X	X	X	2

Player percentages
(Denmark) Team Dupont		(Manitoba) Team Campbell	
My Larsen	90%	Sara Oliver	75%
Jasmin Lander	80%	Rachel Erickson	50%
Mathilde Halse	85%	Abby Ackland	70%
Madeleine Dupont	85%	Jolene Campbell	48%
Total	85%	Total	61%

===== Final =====
Sunday, October 22, 10:30 am

Sheet A	1	2	3	4	5	6	7	8	Final
(South Korea) Kim Eun-jung 🔨	0	1	2	2	0	1	1	X	7
(Denmark) Madeleine Dupont	1	0	0	0	3	0	0	X	4

Player percentages
(South Korea) Team Kim		(Denmark) Team Dupont	
Kim Seon-yeong	91%	My Larsen	84%
Kim Cho-hi	84%	Jasmin Lander	81%
Kim Kyeong-ae	78%	Mathilde Halse	78%
Kim Eun-jung	82%	Madeleine Dupont	70%
Total	84%	Total	79%
