= Koji Nisato =

Japanese male curler

- Curler ♂
- Born: June 3, 1980 (age 46)

Team
- Curling club: Moseushi Curling Association

Curling career
- Member Association: Japan
- World Championship: 1 (2018)
Medal record
Curling

Koji Nisato (似里 浩志, Nisato Kōji; born June 3, 1980) is a Japanese male curler.

== Teams ==
Season	Skip	Third	Second	Lead	Alternate	Coach	Events
2017–18	Go Aoki (fourth)	Masaki Iwai (skip)	Ryotaro Shukuya	Yutaka Aoyama	Koji Nisato	J. D. Lind (WCC)	WCC 2018 (11th)
2019–20	Naomasa Takeda	Kyousuke Fujii	Tetsuo Yamaguchi	Akira Takeda	Koji Nisato		
