= 2018 World Men's Curling Championship =

- Host city: Las Vegas, Nevada
- Arena: Orleans Arena
- Dates: March 31 – April 8, 2018
- Attendance: 74,829
- Winner: Sweden
- Curling club: Karlstads CK, Karlstad
- Skip: Niklas Edin
- Third: Oskar Eriksson
- Second: Rasmus Wranå
- Lead: Christoffer Sundgren
- Alternate: Henrik Leek
- Coach: Fredrik Lindberg
- Finalist: Canada (Brad Gushue)

The 2018 World Men's Curling Championship (branded as the 361˚ World Men's Curling Championship 2018 for sponsorship reasons) was held from March 31 to April 8, 2018 at Orleans Arena, on the Las Vegas Strip in Paradise, Nevada, United States.

In a rematch of the 2017 gold medal game, the Swedish team led by Niklas Edin beat the defending champion Canadian team led by Brad Gushue 7–3 in the final to win the championship. In the game, Edin led 5–0 after five ends, thanks in part to stealing two in the fourth end when Gushue was light on a draw to the four-foot and another steal in the fifth after a missed runback double. Canada condeded the game after eight ends, and won the silver medal. It was the eighth championship for Sweden, and the third for Edin. Scotland, skipped by Bruce Mouat won the bronze.

== Qualification ==
The following nations are qualified to participate in the 2018 World Men's Curling Championship:

- United States (host country)
- One team from the Americas zone
  - Canada (winner of the 2018 Americas Challenge)
- Eight teams from the 2017 European Curling Championships
  - Germany
  - Italy
  - Netherlands
  - Norway
  - Russia
  - Scotland
  - Sweden
  - Switzerland
- Three teams from the 2017 Pacific-Asia Curling Championships
  - China
  - Japan
  - South Korea

== Teams ==
| Canada | China | Germany | Italy | Japan |
|---|---|---|---|---|
| Bally Haly G&CC & St. John's CC, St. John's Skip: Brad Gushue; Third: Mark Nichols; Second: Brett Gallant; Lead: Geoff Walker; Alternate: Thomas Sallows | Harbin CC, Harbin Skip: Zou Dejia; Third: Zou Qiang; Second: Xu Jingtao; Lead: Shao Zhilin; Alternate: Ma Yanlong | Baden Hills G&CC, Rheinmünster Skip: Alexander Baumann; Third: Manuel Walter; Second: Daniel Herberg; Lead: Sebastian Schweizer; Alternate: Ryan Sherrard | A.S.D. Trentino Curling, Cembra Fourth: Amos Mosaner; Skip: Joël Retornaz; Second: Andrea Pilzer; Lead: Daniele Ferrazza; Alternate: Fabio Ribotta | Sapporo CA, Sapporo Fourth: Go Aoki; Skip: Masaki Iwai; Second: Ryotaro Shukuya; Lead: Yutaka Aoyama; Alternate: Koji Nisato |
| Netherlands | Norway | Russia | Scotland | South Korea |
| CC PWA Zoetermeer, Zoetermeer Skip: Jaap van Dorp; Third: Wouter Gösgens; Second: Laurens Hoekman; Lead: Carlo Glasbergen; Alternate: Alexander Magan | Oppdal CK, Oppdal Skip: Steffen Walstad; Third: Markus Høiberg; Second: Magnus Nedregotten; Lead: Magnus Vågberg; Alternate: Steffen Mellemseter | Adamant CC, Saint Petersburg Skip: Alexey Timofeev; Third: Sergey Glukhov; Second: Artur Razhabov; Lead: Evgeny Klimov; Alternate: Artem Shmakov | Gogar Park CC, Edinburgh Skip: Bruce Mouat; Third: Grant Hardie; Second: Bobby Lammie; Lead: Hammy McMillan Jr. Alternate: Ross Paterson | Uiseong CC, Uiseong Skip: Kim Chang-min; Third: Seong Se-hyeon; Second: Oh Eun-su; Lead: Lee Ki-bok; Alternate: Kim Min-chan |
| Sweden | Switzerland | United States | | |
| Karlstads CK, Karlstad Skip: Niklas Edin; Third: Oskar Eriksson; Second: Rasmus Wranå; Lead: Christoffer Sundgren; Alternate: Henrik Leek | CC Bern, Bern Skip: Marc Pfister; Third: Enrico Pfister; Second: Raphael Märki; Lead: Simon Gempeler; Alternate: Jan Hess | St. Paul CC, St. Paul Fourth: Greg Persinger; Skip: Rich Ruohonen; Second: Colin Hufman; Lead: Philip Tilker; Alternate: Christopher Plys | | |

== Round-robin standings ==
Final round-robin standings

Key
| Teams to Playoffs |

| Country | Skip | W | L | PF | PA | Ends Won | Ends Lost | Blank Ends | Stolen Ends | Shot Pct. |
|---|---|---|---|---|---|---|---|---|---|---|
| Sweden | Niklas Edin | 11 | 1 | 79 | 44 | 45 | 40 | 20 | 7 | 88% |
| Scotland | Bruce Mouat | 11 | 1 | 92 | 53 | 53 | 41 | 11 | 16 | 86% |
| Canada | Brad Gushue | 9 | 3 | 86 | 55 | 51 | 41 | 11 | 14 | 87% |
| South Korea | Kim Chang-min | 7 | 5 | 84 | 71 | 48 | 48 | 17 | 9 | 83% |
| Norway | Steffen Walstad | 7 | 5 | 78 | 72 | 53 | 44 | 15 | 16 | 86% |
| United States | Rich Ruohonen | 6 | 6 | 65 | 66 | 48 | 46 | 25 | 11 | 84% |
| Switzerland | Marc Pfister | 6 | 6 | 75 | 82 | 53 | 47 | 17 | 13 | 81% |
| Italy | Joël Retornaz | 5 | 7 | 79 | 76 | 47 | 48 | 15 | 9 | 81% |
| Russia | Alexey Timofeev | 5 | 7 | 71 | 85 | 48 | 51 | 16 | 12 | 80% |
| Netherlands | Jaap van Dorp | 4 | 8 | 66 | 77 | 46 | 55 | 17 | 5 | 81% |
| Japan | Masaki Iwai | 3 | 9 | 60 | 87 | 41 | 51 | 15 | 6 | 78% |
| China | Zou Dejia | 3 | 9 | 60 | 84 | 46 | 51 | 14 | 9 | 81% |
| Germany | Alexander Baumann | 1 | 11 | 53 | 96 | 41 | 57 | 11 | 4 | 78% |

=== WCT ranking ===
Year to date World Curling Tour order of merit ranking for each team prior to the event.

| Nation (Skip) | Rank | Points |
|---|---|---|
| Sweden (Edin) | 1 | 455.02 |
| Canada (Gushue) | 2 | 431.42 |
| Scotland (Mouat) | 7 | 285.29 |
| South Korea (Kim) | 13 | 238.06 |
| Norway (Walstad) | 16 | 200.67 |
| United States (Ruohonen) | 21 | 162.77 |
| Switzerland (Pfister) | 34 | 114.24 |
| Germany (Baumann) | 42 | 94.76 |
| Italy (Retornaz) | 49 | 84.00 |
| Netherlands (van Dorp) | 50 | 82.52 |
| China (Zou) | 86 | 45.28 |
| Russia (Timofeev) | 145 | 21.15 |
| Japan (Iwai) | 682 | 0.00 |

== Round-robin results ==
All draw times are listed in Pacific Daylight Time (UTC−7:00).

=== Draw 1 ===
Saturday, March 31, 13:30

| Sheet A | 1 | 2 | 3 | 4 | 5 | 6 | 7 | 8 | 9 | 10 | Final |
|---|---|---|---|---|---|---|---|---|---|---|---|
| Sweden (Edin) | 1 | 0 | 0 | 1 | 0 | 0 | 3 | 0 | 0 | 1 | 6 |
| Germany (Baumann) | 0 | 0 | 1 | 0 | 1 | 1 | 0 | 0 | 2 | 0 | 5 |

| Sheet B | 1 | 2 | 3 | 4 | 5 | 6 | 7 | 8 | 9 | 10 | Final |
|---|---|---|---|---|---|---|---|---|---|---|---|
| Netherlands (van Dorp) | 1 | 0 | 1 | 0 | 1 | 0 | 1 | 0 | 0 | 0 | 4 |
| South Korea (Kim) | 0 | 1 | 0 | 1 | 0 | 1 | 0 | 1 | 2 | 1 | 7 |

| Sheet C | 1 | 2 | 3 | 4 | 5 | 6 | 7 | 8 | 9 | 10 | Final |
|---|---|---|---|---|---|---|---|---|---|---|---|
| China (Zou) | 0 | 0 | 0 | 1 | 0 | 0 | 2 | 2 | 0 | 1 | 6 |
| Switzerland (Pfister) | 0 | 1 | 1 | 0 | 0 | 2 | 0 | 0 | 1 | 0 | 5 |

| Sheet D | 1 | 2 | 3 | 4 | 5 | 6 | 7 | 8 | 9 | 10 | Final |
|---|---|---|---|---|---|---|---|---|---|---|---|
| Russia (Timofeev) | 0 | 0 | 1 | 0 | 2 | 1 | 1 | 0 | 1 | X | 6 |
| Canada (Gushue) | 3 | 0 | 0 | 2 | 0 | 0 | 0 | 2 | 0 | X | 7 |

=== Draw 2 ===
Saturday, March 31, 18:30

| Sheet A | 1 | 2 | 3 | 4 | 5 | 6 | 7 | 8 | 9 | 10 | Final |
|---|---|---|---|---|---|---|---|---|---|---|---|
| Norway (Walstad) | 0 | 2 | 0 | 0 | 0 | 3 | 1 | 4 | X | X | 10 |
| Italy (Retornaz) | 0 | 0 | 1 | 0 | 3 | 0 | 0 | 0 | X | X | 4 |

| Sheet B | 1 | 2 | 3 | 4 | 5 | 6 | 7 | 8 | 9 | 10 | 11 | Final |
|---|---|---|---|---|---|---|---|---|---|---|---|---|
| United States (Ruohonen) | 0 | 0 | 2 | 1 | 0 | 1 | 0 | 0 | 1 | 0 | 1 | 6 |
| Japan (Iwai) | 2 | 0 | 0 | 0 | 0 | 0 | 1 | 1 | 0 | 1 | 0 | 5 |

| Sheet C | 1 | 2 | 3 | 4 | 5 | 6 | 7 | 8 | 9 | 10 | Final |
|---|---|---|---|---|---|---|---|---|---|---|---|
| Canada (Gushue) | 2 | 0 | 2 | 0 | 1 | 0 | 0 | 1 | 1 | 0 | 7 |
| Scotland (Mouat) | 0 | 2 | 0 | 1 | 0 | 1 | 2 | 0 | 0 | 2 | 8 |

| Sheet D | 1 | 2 | 3 | 4 | 5 | 6 | 7 | 8 | 9 | 10 | Final |
|---|---|---|---|---|---|---|---|---|---|---|---|
| Sweden (Edin) | 0 | 2 | 0 | 2 | 0 | 3 | 0 | 0 | X | X | 7 |
| Switzerland (Pfister) | 0 | 0 | 1 | 0 | 1 | 0 | 0 | 1 | X | X | 3 |

=== Draw 3 ===
Sunday, April 1, 08:30

| Sheet A | 1 | 2 | 3 | 4 | 5 | 6 | 7 | 8 | 9 | 10 | 11 | Final |
|---|---|---|---|---|---|---|---|---|---|---|---|---|
| Russia (Timofeev) | 0 | 1 | 0 | 0 | 2 | 0 | 0 | 2 | 1 | 0 | 1 | 7 |
| China (Zou) | 1 | 0 | 0 | 1 | 0 | 1 | 1 | 0 | 0 | 2 | 0 | 6 |

| Sheet B | 1 | 2 | 3 | 4 | 5 | 6 | 7 | 8 | 9 | 10 | Final |
|---|---|---|---|---|---|---|---|---|---|---|---|
| Norway (Walstad) | 2 | 2 | 0 | 1 | 2 | 0 | 1 | X | X | X | 8 |
| Germany (Baumann) | 0 | 0 | 1 | 0 | 0 | 1 | 0 | X | X | X | 2 |

| Sheet C | 1 | 2 | 3 | 4 | 5 | 6 | 7 | 8 | 9 | 10 | Final |
|---|---|---|---|---|---|---|---|---|---|---|---|
| Japan (Iwai) | 0 | 0 | 1 | 0 | 1 | 0 | 0 | X | X | X | 2 |
| South Korea (Kim) | 0 | 1 | 0 | 3 | 0 | 3 | 2 | X | X | X | 9 |

| Sheet D | 1 | 2 | 3 | 4 | 5 | 6 | 7 | 8 | 9 | 10 | Final |
|---|---|---|---|---|---|---|---|---|---|---|---|
| United States (Ruohonen) | 0 | 2 | 0 | 0 | 2 | 0 | 0 | 0 | 0 | 0 | 4 |
| Netherlands (van Dorp) | 2 | 0 | 0 | 1 | 0 | 0 | 0 | 1 | 1 | 1 | 6 |

=== Draw 4 ===
Sunday, April 1, 13:30

| Sheet A | 1 | 2 | 3 | 4 | 5 | 6 | 7 | 8 | 9 | 10 | Final |
|---|---|---|---|---|---|---|---|---|---|---|---|
| South Korea (Kim) | 0 | 1 | 0 | 1 | 0 | 0 | 2 | 0 | 2 | 1 | 7 |
| United States (Ruohonen) | 0 | 0 | 1 | 0 | 3 | 0 | 0 | 1 | 0 | 0 | 5 |

| Sheet B | 1 | 2 | 3 | 4 | 5 | 6 | 7 | 8 | 9 | 10 | Final |
|---|---|---|---|---|---|---|---|---|---|---|---|
| Scotland (Mouat) | 0 | 0 | 0 | 1 | 2 | 0 | 0 | 3 | 0 | 0 | 6 |
| Italy (Retornaz) | 0 | 0 | 2 | 0 | 0 | 0 | 1 | 0 | 0 | 1 | 4 |

| Sheet C | 1 | 2 | 3 | 4 | 5 | 6 | 7 | 8 | 9 | 10 | Final |
|---|---|---|---|---|---|---|---|---|---|---|---|
| Netherlands (van Dorp) | 0 | 0 | 0 | 0 | 1 | 0 | 0 | 1 | 0 | X | 2 |
| Sweden (Edin) | 2 | 0 | 0 | 0 | 0 | 0 | 2 | 0 | 1 | X | 5 |

| Sheet D | 1 | 2 | 3 | 4 | 5 | 6 | 7 | 8 | 9 | 10 | Final |
|---|---|---|---|---|---|---|---|---|---|---|---|
| Japan (Iwai) | 0 | 0 | 1 | 0 | 2 | 0 | 1 | 0 | 0 | X | 4 |
| Norway (Walstad) | 2 | 0 | 0 | 1 | 0 | 2 | 0 | 2 | 1 | X | 8 |

=== Draw 5 ===
Sunday, April 1, 18:30

| Sheet A | 1 | 2 | 3 | 4 | 5 | 6 | 7 | 8 | 9 | 10 | Final |
|---|---|---|---|---|---|---|---|---|---|---|---|
| Scotland (Mouat) | 1 | 0 | 2 | 1 | 0 | 1 | 0 | 1 | 0 | 0 | 6 |
| Sweden (Edin) | 0 | 1 | 0 | 0 | 3 | 0 | 2 | 0 | 0 | 1 | 7 |

| Sheet B | 1 | 2 | 3 | 4 | 5 | 6 | 7 | 8 | 9 | 10 | Final |
|---|---|---|---|---|---|---|---|---|---|---|---|
| Canada (Gushue) | 2 | 2 | 0 | 2 | 1 | 0 | X | X | X | X | 7 |
| Switzerland (Pfister) | 0 | 0 | 1 | 0 | 0 | 1 | X | X | X | X | 2 |

| Sheet C | 1 | 2 | 3 | 4 | 5 | 6 | 7 | 8 | 9 | 10 | Final |
|---|---|---|---|---|---|---|---|---|---|---|---|
| Italy (Retornaz) | 0 | 1 | 1 | 0 | 0 | 2 | 0 | 2 | 0 | 3 | 9 |
| Russia (Timofeev) | 2 | 0 | 0 | 2 | 0 | 0 | 1 | 0 | 1 | 0 | 6 |

| Sheet D | 1 | 2 | 3 | 4 | 5 | 6 | 7 | 8 | 9 | 10 | Final |
|---|---|---|---|---|---|---|---|---|---|---|---|
| China (Zou) | 0 | 0 | 2 | 0 | 1 | 0 | 1 | 0 | 2 | 0 | 6 |
| Germany (Baumann) | 0 | 1 | 0 | 0 | 0 | 1 | 0 | 2 | 0 | 1 | 5 |

=== Draw 6 ===
Monday, April 2, 08:30

| Sheet B | 1 | 2 | 3 | 4 | 5 | 6 | 7 | 8 | 9 | 10 | 11 | Final |
|---|---|---|---|---|---|---|---|---|---|---|---|---|
| Japan (Iwai) | 1 | 2 | 0 | 0 | 2 | 0 | 0 | 0 | 0 | 1 | 1 | 7 |
| Netherlands (van Dorp) | 0 | 0 | 2 | 0 | 0 | 0 | 2 | 1 | 1 | 0 | 0 | 6 |

| Sheet C | 1 | 2 | 3 | 4 | 5 | 6 | 7 | 8 | 9 | 10 | Final |
|---|---|---|---|---|---|---|---|---|---|---|---|
| Norway (Walstad) | 2 | 0 | 0 | 0 | 1 | 0 | 1 | 0 | 1 | 2 | 7 |
| United States (Ruohonen) | 0 | 1 | 1 | 1 | 0 | 0 | 0 | 2 | 0 | 0 | 5 |

=== Draw 7 ===
Monday, April 2, 13:30

| Sheet A | 1 | 2 | 3 | 4 | 5 | 6 | 7 | 8 | 9 | 10 | Final |
|---|---|---|---|---|---|---|---|---|---|---|---|
| Italy (Retornaz) | 0 | 1 | 0 | 2 | 0 | 3 | 0 | 1 | 0 | 0 | 7 |
| Canada (Gushue) | 2 | 0 | 2 | 0 | 1 | 0 | 1 | 0 | 1 | 1 | 8 |

| Sheet B | 1 | 2 | 3 | 4 | 5 | 6 | 7 | 8 | 9 | 10 | Final |
|---|---|---|---|---|---|---|---|---|---|---|---|
| South Korea (Kim) | 0 | 1 | 0 | 1 | 0 | 1 | 0 | 1 | 0 | X | 4 |
| China (Zou) | 3 | 0 | 2 | 0 | 2 | 0 | 1 | 0 | 1 | X | 9 |

| Sheet C | 1 | 2 | 3 | 4 | 5 | 6 | 7 | 8 | 9 | 10 | Final |
|---|---|---|---|---|---|---|---|---|---|---|---|
| Switzerland (Pfister) | 0 | 1 | 1 | 0 | 0 | 1 | 0 | 2 | 0 | 2 | 7 |
| Germany (Baumann) | 0 | 0 | 0 | 2 | 0 | 0 | 1 | 0 | 1 | 0 | 4 |

| Sheet D | 1 | 2 | 3 | 4 | 5 | 6 | 7 | 8 | 9 | 10 | 11 | Final |
|---|---|---|---|---|---|---|---|---|---|---|---|---|
| Scotland (Mouat) | 0 | 2 | 0 | 2 | 0 | 0 | 0 | 1 | 0 | 1 | 1 | 7 |
| United States (Ruohonen) | 1 | 0 | 2 | 0 | 0 | 2 | 0 | 0 | 1 | 0 | 0 | 6 |

=== Draw 8 ===
Monday, April 2, 18:30

| Sheet A | 1 | 2 | 3 | 4 | 5 | 6 | 7 | 8 | 9 | 10 | 11 | Final |
|---|---|---|---|---|---|---|---|---|---|---|---|---|
| Germany (Baumann) | 0 | 0 | 1 | 0 | 1 | 0 | 2 | 0 | 3 | 0 | 1 | 8 |
| Netherlands (van Dorp) | 1 | 0 | 0 | 2 | 0 | 2 | 0 | 1 | 0 | 1 | 0 | 7 |

| Sheet B | 1 | 2 | 3 | 4 | 5 | 6 | 7 | 8 | 9 | 10 | Final |
|---|---|---|---|---|---|---|---|---|---|---|---|
| Russia (Timofeev) | 3 | 0 | 2 | 0 | 1 | 0 | 0 | 1 | 3 | 0 | 10 |
| Norway (Walstad) | 0 | 2 | 0 | 2 | 0 | 2 | 1 | 0 | 0 | 1 | 8 |

| Sheet C | 1 | 2 | 3 | 4 | 5 | 6 | 7 | 8 | 9 | 10 | Final |
|---|---|---|---|---|---|---|---|---|---|---|---|
| China (Zou) | 0 | 0 | 0 | 1 | 0 | 1 | 0 | 0 | 2 | X | 4 |
| Japan (Iwai) | 0 | 0 | 1 | 0 | 2 | 0 | 2 | 2 | 0 | X | 7 |

| Sheet D | 1 | 2 | 3 | 4 | 5 | 6 | 7 | 8 | 9 | 10 | Final |
|---|---|---|---|---|---|---|---|---|---|---|---|
| South Korea (Kim) | 1 | 0 | 1 | 0 | 0 | 0 | 1 | 0 | 1 | 0 | 4 |
| Sweden (Edin) | 0 | 1 | 0 | 1 | 0 | 1 | 0 | 1 | 0 | 1 | 5 |

=== Draw 9 ===
Tuesday, April 3, 08:30

| Sheet A | 1 | 2 | 3 | 4 | 5 | 6 | 7 | 8 | 9 | 10 | Final |
|---|---|---|---|---|---|---|---|---|---|---|---|
| Japan (Iwai) | 0 | 2 | 0 | 2 | 0 | 0 | 0 | 1 | 0 | 0 | 5 |
| Russia (Timofeev) | 3 | 0 | 1 | 0 | 1 | 0 | 0 | 0 | 0 | 1 | 6 |

| Sheet B | 1 | 2 | 3 | 4 | 5 | 6 | 7 | 8 | 9 | 10 | Final |
|---|---|---|---|---|---|---|---|---|---|---|---|
| Germany (Baumann) | 0 | 1 | 0 | 0 | 1 | 1 | 1 | 0 | X | X | 4 |
| Scotland (Mouat) | 1 | 0 | 3 | 2 | 0 | 0 | 0 | 3 | X | X | 9 |

| Sheet C | 1 | 2 | 3 | 4 | 5 | 6 | 7 | 8 | 9 | 10 | 11 | Final |
|---|---|---|---|---|---|---|---|---|---|---|---|---|
| South Korea (Kim) | 0 | 0 | 0 | 0 | 2 | 0 | 0 | 2 | 0 | 2 | 0 | 6 |
| Canada (Gushue) | 0 | 1 | 0 | 2 | 0 | 2 | 0 | 0 | 1 | 0 | 1 | 7 |

| Sheet D | 1 | 2 | 3 | 4 | 5 | 6 | 7 | 8 | 9 | 10 | Final |
|---|---|---|---|---|---|---|---|---|---|---|---|
| Switzerland (Pfister) | 0 | 1 | 0 | 1 | 0 | 0 | 1 | 2 | 0 | 1 | 6 |
| Italy (Retornaz) | 1 | 0 | 1 | 0 | 0 | 2 | 0 | 0 | 1 | 0 | 5 |

=== Draw 10 ===
Tuesday, April 3, 13:30

| Sheet A | 1 | 2 | 3 | 4 | 5 | 6 | 7 | 8 | 9 | 10 | Final |
|---|---|---|---|---|---|---|---|---|---|---|---|
| China (Zou) | 1 | 0 | 1 | 0 | 1 | 0 | 1 | 0 | 1 | 0 | 5 |
| Norway (Walstad) | 0 | 1 | 0 | 1 | 0 | 1 | 0 | 2 | 0 | 1 | 6 |

| Sheet B | 1 | 2 | 3 | 4 | 5 | 6 | 7 | 8 | 9 | 10 | Final |
|---|---|---|---|---|---|---|---|---|---|---|---|
| United States (Ruohonen) | 0 | 0 | 0 | 1 | 0 | 1 | 0 | X | X | X | 2 |
| Sweden (Edin) | 2 | 0 | 0 | 0 | 3 | 0 | 2 | X | X | X | 7 |

| Sheet C | 1 | 2 | 3 | 4 | 5 | 6 | 7 | 8 | 9 | 10 | Final |
|---|---|---|---|---|---|---|---|---|---|---|---|
| Scotland (Mouat) | 1 | 2 | 0 | 2 | 0 | 1 | 0 | 2 | X | X | 8 |
| Netherlands (van Dorp) | 0 | 0 | 0 | 0 | 2 | 0 | 1 | 0 | X | X | 3 |

| Sheet D | 1 | 2 | 3 | 4 | 5 | 6 | 7 | 8 | 9 | 10 | Final |
|---|---|---|---|---|---|---|---|---|---|---|---|
| Canada (Gushue) | 3 | 0 | 2 | 0 | 2 | 2 | X | X | X | X | 9 |
| Japan (Iwai) | 0 | 1 | 0 | 1 | 0 | 0 | X | X | X | X | 2 |

=== Draw 11 ===
Tuesday, April 3, 18:30

| Sheet A | 1 | 2 | 3 | 4 | 5 | 6 | 7 | 8 | 9 | 10 | Final |
|---|---|---|---|---|---|---|---|---|---|---|---|
| Switzerland (Pfister) | 0 | 3 | 0 | 2 | 2 | 0 | 1 | 0 | 2 | 2 | 12 |
| South Korea (Kim) | 0 | 0 | 4 | 0 | 0 | 3 | 0 | 4 | 0 | 0 | 11 |

| Sheet B | 1 | 2 | 3 | 4 | 5 | 6 | 7 | 8 | 9 | 10 | Final |
|---|---|---|---|---|---|---|---|---|---|---|---|
| China (Zou) | 0 | 0 | 1 | 0 | 2 | 0 | 0 | 2 | 0 | X | 5 |
| Italy (Retornaz) | 2 | 1 | 0 | 1 | 0 | 0 | 2 | 0 | 5 | X | 11 |

| Sheet C | 1 | 2 | 3 | 4 | 5 | 6 | 7 | 8 | 9 | 10 | Final |
|---|---|---|---|---|---|---|---|---|---|---|---|
| Sweden (Edin) | 1 | 0 | 0 | 1 | 0 | 1 | 0 | 0 | 0 | 0 | 3 |
| Norway (Walstad) | 0 | 0 | 1 | 0 | 1 | 0 | 1 | 1 | 0 | 1 | 5 |

| Sheet D | 1 | 2 | 3 | 4 | 5 | 6 | 7 | 8 | 9 | 10 | Final |
|---|---|---|---|---|---|---|---|---|---|---|---|
| Germany (Baumann) | 1 | 0 | 0 | 0 | 2 | 0 | 2 | 0 | 1 | 0 | 6 |
| Russia (Timofeev) | 0 | 0 | 1 | 1 | 0 | 2 | 0 | 3 | 0 | 1 | 8 |

=== Draw 12 ===
Wednesday, April 4, 08:30

| Sheet A | 1 | 2 | 3 | 4 | 5 | 6 | 7 | 8 | 9 | 10 | Final |
|---|---|---|---|---|---|---|---|---|---|---|---|
| Sweden (Edin) | 0 | 4 | 0 | 3 | 2 | 0 | X | X | X | X | 9 |
| Italy (Retornaz) | 1 | 0 | 2 | 0 | 0 | 1 | X | X | X | X | 4 |

| Sheet B | 1 | 2 | 3 | 4 | 5 | 6 | 7 | 8 | 9 | 10 | Final |
|---|---|---|---|---|---|---|---|---|---|---|---|
| Norway (Walstad) | 0 | 0 | 0 | 1 | 0 | 1 | 0 | X | X | X | 2 |
| Canada (Gushue) | 2 | 0 | 1 | 0 | 2 | 0 | 3 | X | X | X | 8 |

| Sheet C | 1 | 2 | 3 | 4 | 5 | 6 | 7 | 8 | 9 | 10 | Final |
|---|---|---|---|---|---|---|---|---|---|---|---|
| United States (Ruohonen) | 1 | 0 | 0 | 0 | 2 | 2 | 0 | 0 | 1 | 0 | 6 |
| Russia (Timofeev) | 0 | 0 | 2 | 2 | 0 | 0 | 1 | 0 | 0 | 2 | 7 |

| Sheet D | 1 | 2 | 3 | 4 | 5 | 6 | 7 | 8 | 9 | 10 | Final |
|---|---|---|---|---|---|---|---|---|---|---|---|
| South Korea (Kim) | 1 | 0 | 0 | 0 | 0 | 1 | 0 | X | X | X | 2 |
| Scotland (Mouat) | 0 | 0 | 2 | 1 | 0 | 0 | 4 | X | X | X | 7 |

=== Draw 13 ===
Wednesday, April 4, 13:30

| Sheet A | 1 | 2 | 3 | 4 | 5 | 6 | 7 | 8 | 9 | 10 | Final |
|---|---|---|---|---|---|---|---|---|---|---|---|
| United States (Ruohonen) | 0 | 1 | 0 | 2 | 0 | 2 | 0 | 0 | 2 | 1 | 8 |
| Germany (Baumann) | 0 | 0 | 2 | 0 | 2 | 0 | 0 | 1 | 0 | 0 | 5 |

| Sheet B | 1 | 2 | 3 | 4 | 5 | 6 | 7 | 8 | 9 | 10 | 11 | Final |
|---|---|---|---|---|---|---|---|---|---|---|---|---|
| Switzerland (Pfister) | 2 | 0 | 0 | 2 | 0 | 1 | 0 | 0 | 0 | 1 | 1 | 7 |
| Russia (Timofeev) | 0 | 1 | 0 | 0 | 2 | 0 | 2 | 1 | 0 | 0 | 0 | 6 |

| Sheet C | 1 | 2 | 3 | 4 | 5 | 6 | 7 | 8 | 9 | 10 | Final |
|---|---|---|---|---|---|---|---|---|---|---|---|
| Japan (Iwai) | 0 | 2 | 0 | 2 | 0 | 1 | 0 | 1 | X | X | 6 |
| Italy (Retornaz) | 4 | 0 | 3 | 0 | 1 | 0 | 2 | 0 | X | X | 10 |

| Sheet D | 1 | 2 | 3 | 4 | 5 | 6 | 7 | 8 | 9 | 10 | Final |
|---|---|---|---|---|---|---|---|---|---|---|---|
| Netherlands (van Dorp) | 2 | 0 | 0 | 1 | 0 | 2 | 0 | 0 | 0 | 1 | 6 |
| China (Zou) | 0 | 2 | 0 | 0 | 1 | 0 | 1 | 1 | 0 | 0 | 5 |

=== Draw 14 ===
Wednesday, April 4, 18:30

| Sheet A | 1 | 2 | 3 | 4 | 5 | 6 | 7 | 8 | 9 | 10 | Final |
|---|---|---|---|---|---|---|---|---|---|---|---|
| Netherlands (van Dorp) | 1 | 0 | 0 | 1 | 0 | 1 | 0 | 2 | 0 | X | 5 |
| Canada (Gushue) | 0 | 2 | 1 | 0 | 3 | 0 | 1 | 0 | 1 | X | 8 |

| Sheet B | 1 | 2 | 3 | 4 | 5 | 6 | 7 | 8 | 9 | 10 | Final |
|---|---|---|---|---|---|---|---|---|---|---|---|
| Scotland (Mouat) | 2 | 0 | 2 | 1 | 0 | 3 | 1 | X | X | X | 9 |
| Japan (Iwai) | 0 | 1 | 0 | 0 | 1 | 0 | 0 | X | X | X | 2 |

| Sheet C | 1 | 2 | 3 | 4 | 5 | 6 | 7 | 8 | 9 | 10 | Final |
|---|---|---|---|---|---|---|---|---|---|---|---|
| Germany (Baumann) | 0 | 1 | 0 | 1 | 0 | 1 | 2 | 0 | 1 | 0 | 6 |
| South Korea (Kim) | 2 | 0 | 1 | 0 | 3 | 0 | 0 | 1 | 0 | 3 | 10 |

| Sheet D | 1 | 2 | 3 | 4 | 5 | 6 | 7 | 8 | 9 | 10 | 11 | Final |
|---|---|---|---|---|---|---|---|---|---|---|---|---|
| Norway (Walstad) | 0 | 3 | 0 | 0 | 1 | 0 | 0 | 1 | 1 | 0 | 0 | 6 |
| Switzerland (Pfister) | 3 | 0 | 0 | 1 | 0 | 0 | 0 | 0 | 0 | 2 | 2 | 8 |

=== Draw 15 ===
Thursday, April 5, 08:30

| Sheet A | 1 | 2 | 3 | 4 | 5 | 6 | 7 | 8 | 9 | 10 | Final |
|---|---|---|---|---|---|---|---|---|---|---|---|
| Norway (Walstad) | 1 | 0 | 0 | 0 | 1 | 0 | 2 | 0 | 2 | 0 | 6 |
| Scotland (Mouat) | 0 | 1 | 0 | 1 | 0 | 2 | 0 | 3 | 0 | 1 | 8 |

| Sheet B | 1 | 2 | 3 | 4 | 5 | 6 | 7 | 8 | 9 | 10 | Final |
|---|---|---|---|---|---|---|---|---|---|---|---|
| Sweden (Edin) | 4 | 3 | 1 | 1 | 0 | 0 | 1 | X | X | X | 10 |
| China (Zou) | 0 | 0 | 0 | 0 | 1 | 1 | 0 | X | X | X | 2 |

| Sheet C | 1 | 2 | 3 | 4 | 5 | 6 | 7 | 8 | 9 | 10 | Final |
|---|---|---|---|---|---|---|---|---|---|---|---|
| Netherlands (van Dorp) | 0 | 2 | 0 | 1 | 0 | 2 | 0 | 1 | 0 | 2 | 8 |
| Switzerland (Pfister) | 1 | 0 | 1 | 0 | 1 | 0 | 1 | 0 | 2 | 0 | 6 |

| Sheet D | 1 | 2 | 3 | 4 | 5 | 6 | 7 | 8 | 9 | 10 | 11 | Final |
|---|---|---|---|---|---|---|---|---|---|---|---|---|
| Italy (Retornaz) | 1 | 0 | 0 | 0 | 0 | 0 | 2 | 0 | 1 | 1 | 0 | 5 |
| South Korea (Kim) | 0 | 1 | 2 | 1 | 0 | 0 | 0 | 1 | 0 | 0 | 1 | 6 |

=== Draw 16 ===
Thursday, April 5, 13:30

| Sheet A | 1 | 2 | 3 | 4 | 5 | 6 | 7 | 8 | 9 | 10 | Final |
|---|---|---|---|---|---|---|---|---|---|---|---|
| Germany (Baumann) | 0 | 1 | 0 | 0 | 1 | 0 | 0 | 1 | 0 | X | 3 |
| Japan (Iwai) | 1 | 0 | 0 | 2 | 0 | 3 | 1 | 0 | 1 | X | 8 |

| Sheet B | 1 | 2 | 3 | 4 | 5 | 6 | 7 | 8 | 9 | 10 | Final |
|---|---|---|---|---|---|---|---|---|---|---|---|
| Italy (Retornaz) | 0 | 0 | 1 | 0 | 0 | 1 | 0 | 1 | 0 | 0 | 3 |
| United States (Ruohonen) | 0 | 1 | 0 | 0 | 1 | 0 | 1 | 0 | 1 | 1 | 5 |

| Sheet C | 1 | 2 | 3 | 4 | 5 | 6 | 7 | 8 | 9 | 10 | Final |
|---|---|---|---|---|---|---|---|---|---|---|---|
| Canada (Gushue) | 0 | 0 | 1 | 0 | 3 | 0 | 0 | 3 | 0 | X | 7 |
| China (Zou) | 1 | 0 | 0 | 1 | 0 | 1 | 1 | 0 | 0 | X | 4 |

| Sheet D | 1 | 2 | 3 | 4 | 5 | 6 | 7 | 8 | 9 | 10 | Final |
|---|---|---|---|---|---|---|---|---|---|---|---|
| Sweden (Edin) | 2 | 1 | 0 | 0 | 0 | 2 | 0 | 0 | 2 | X | 7 |
| Russia (Timofeev) | 0 | 0 | 1 | 0 | 1 | 0 | 0 | 1 | 0 | X | 3 |

=== Draw 17 ===
Thursday, April 5, 18:30

| Sheet A | 1 | 2 | 3 | 4 | 5 | 6 | 7 | 8 | 9 | 10 | Final |
|---|---|---|---|---|---|---|---|---|---|---|---|
| Canada (Gushue) | 0 | 2 | 0 | 0 | 1 | 0 | 0 | 0 | 2 | 0 | 5 |
| United States (Ruohonen) | 1 | 0 | 1 | 1 | 0 | 0 | 2 | 0 | 0 | 1 | 6 |

| Sheet B | 1 | 2 | 3 | 4 | 5 | 6 | 7 | 8 | 9 | 10 | Final |
|---|---|---|---|---|---|---|---|---|---|---|---|
| Netherlands (van Dorp) | 1 | 0 | 0 | 1 | 0 | 0 | 3 | 0 | 1 | 0 | 6 |
| Norway (Walstad) | 0 | 1 | 1 | 0 | 0 | 2 | 0 | 2 | 0 | 1 | 7 |

| Sheet C | 1 | 2 | 3 | 4 | 5 | 6 | 7 | 8 | 9 | 10 | Final |
|---|---|---|---|---|---|---|---|---|---|---|---|
| Russia (Timofeev) | 0 | 0 | 0 | 1 | 1 | 0 | 0 | X | X | X | 2 |
| Scotland (Mouat) | 1 | 1 | 1 | 0 | 0 | 2 | 2 | X | X | X | 7 |

| Sheet D | 1 | 2 | 3 | 4 | 5 | 6 | 7 | 8 | 9 | 10 | 11 | Final |
|---|---|---|---|---|---|---|---|---|---|---|---|---|
| Switzerland (Pfister) | 2 | 0 | 2 | 0 | 0 | 2 | 0 | 1 | 0 | 2 | 1 | 10 |
| Japan (Iwai) | 0 | 1 | 0 | 2 | 0 | 0 | 3 | 0 | 3 | 0 | 0 | 9 |

=== Draw 18 ===
Friday, April 6, 08:30

| Sheet A | 1 | 2 | 3 | 4 | 5 | 6 | 7 | 8 | 9 | 10 | Final |
|---|---|---|---|---|---|---|---|---|---|---|---|
| Scotland (Mouat) | 1 | 0 | 0 | 3 | 0 | 0 | 1 | 0 | 2 | 1 | 8 |
| Switzerland (Pfister) | 0 | 2 | 1 | 0 | 1 | 1 | 0 | 1 | 0 | 0 | 6 |

| Sheet B | 1 | 2 | 3 | 4 | 5 | 6 | 7 | 8 | 9 | 10 | Final |
|---|---|---|---|---|---|---|---|---|---|---|---|
| Canada (Gushue) | 0 | 1 | 0 | 0 | 0 | 1 | 2 | 0 | 1 | 0 | 5 |
| Sweden (Edin) | 3 | 0 | 0 | 1 | 0 | 0 | 0 | 1 | 0 | 1 | 6 |

| Sheet C | 1 | 2 | 3 | 4 | 5 | 6 | 7 | 8 | 9 | 10 | Final |
|---|---|---|---|---|---|---|---|---|---|---|---|
| Italy (Retornaz) | 0 | 2 | 0 | 1 | 0 | 3 | 3 | 2 | X | X | 11 |
| Germany (Baumann) | 1 | 0 | 2 | 0 | 1 | 0 | 0 | 0 | X | X | 4 |

| Sheet D | 1 | 2 | 3 | 4 | 5 | 6 | 7 | 8 | 9 | 10 | Final |
|---|---|---|---|---|---|---|---|---|---|---|---|
| United States (Ruohonen) | 1 | 1 | 0 | 3 | 0 | 0 | 0 | 1 | 0 | 1 | 7 |
| China (Zou) | 0 | 0 | 1 | 0 | 0 | 1 | 0 | 0 | 2 | 0 | 4 |

=== Draw 19 ===
Friday, April 6, 13:30

| Sheet A | 1 | 2 | 3 | 4 | 5 | 6 | 7 | 8 | 9 | 10 | Final |
|---|---|---|---|---|---|---|---|---|---|---|---|
| Japan (Iwai) | 0 | 1 | 0 | 1 | 0 | 0 | 0 | 1 | 0 | X | 3 |
| Sweden (Edin) | 1 | 0 | 2 | 0 | 0 | 0 | 3 | 0 | 1 | X | 7 |

| Sheet B | 1 | 2 | 3 | 4 | 5 | 6 | 7 | 8 | 9 | 10 | Final |
|---|---|---|---|---|---|---|---|---|---|---|---|
| China (Zou) | 0 | 1 | 0 | 1 | 1 | 1 | 0 | X | X | X | 4 |
| Scotland (Mouat) | 6 | 0 | 1 | 0 | 0 | 0 | 2 | X | X | X | 9 |

| Sheet C | 1 | 2 | 3 | 4 | 5 | 6 | 7 | 8 | 9 | 10 | Final |
|---|---|---|---|---|---|---|---|---|---|---|---|
| South Korea (Kim) | 0 | 0 | 0 | 2 | 0 | 0 | 0 | 4 | 0 | 3 | 9 |
| Norway (Walstad) | 0 | 1 | 1 | 0 | 0 | 2 | 0 | 0 | 1 | 0 | 5 |

| Sheet D | 1 | 2 | 3 | 4 | 5 | 6 | 7 | 8 | 9 | 10 | Final |
|---|---|---|---|---|---|---|---|---|---|---|---|
| Russia (Timofeev) | 0 | 0 | 1 | 0 | 1 | 1 | 2 | 1 | 0 | 0 | 6 |
| Netherlands (van Dorp) | 2 | 2 | 0 | 1 | 0 | 0 | 0 | 0 | 0 | 2 | 7 |

=== Draw 20 ===
Friday, April 6, 18:30

| Sheet A | 1 | 2 | 3 | 4 | 5 | 6 | 7 | 8 | 9 | 10 | Final |
|---|---|---|---|---|---|---|---|---|---|---|---|
| Italy (Retornaz) | 0 | 0 | 0 | 1 | 0 | 1 | 1 | 2 | 0 | 1 | 6 |
| Netherlands (van Dorp) | 0 | 0 | 1 | 0 | 3 | 0 | 0 | 0 | 1 | 0 | 5 |

| Sheet B | 1 | 2 | 3 | 4 | 5 | 6 | 7 | 8 | 9 | 10 | Final |
|---|---|---|---|---|---|---|---|---|---|---|---|
| Russia (Timofeev) | 0 | 0 | 0 | 2 | 0 | 2 | 0 | 0 | X | X | 4 |
| South Korea (Kim) | 0 | 1 | 1 | 0 | 4 | 0 | 0 | 3 | X | X | 9 |

| Sheet C | 1 | 2 | 3 | 4 | 5 | 6 | 7 | 8 | 9 | 10 | Final |
|---|---|---|---|---|---|---|---|---|---|---|---|
| Switzerland (Pfister) | 0 | 0 | 1 | 0 | 0 | 1 | 0 | 0 | 0 | 1 | 3 |
| United States (Ruohonen) | 0 | 2 | 0 | 0 | 1 | 0 | 0 | 1 | 1 | 0 | 5 |

| Sheet D | 1 | 2 | 3 | 4 | 5 | 6 | 7 | 8 | 9 | 10 | Final |
|---|---|---|---|---|---|---|---|---|---|---|---|
| Germany (Baumann) | 0 | 0 | 0 | 0 | 1 | 0 | X | X | X | X | 1 |
| Canada (Gushue) | 1 | 1 | 1 | 2 | 0 | 3 | X | X | X | X | 8 |

== Playoffs ==
Qualification games
4 | South Korea | 7
5 | Norway | 5
3 | Canada | 6
6 | United States | 4

Semifinals
1 | Sweden | 9
4 | South Korea | 8
2 | Scotland | 5
3 | Canada | 9

Final
1 | Sweden | 7
3 | Canada | 3
Bronze medal game
2 | Scotland | 11
4 | South Korea | 4

=== Qualification games ===
Saturday, April 7, 08:30

| Sheet B | 1 | 2 | 3 | 4 | 5 | 6 | 7 | 8 | 9 | 10 | Final |
|---|---|---|---|---|---|---|---|---|---|---|---|
| South Korea (Kim) | 2 | 0 | 1 | 0 | 0 | 1 | 0 | 2 | 0 | 1 | 7 |
| Norway (Walstad) | 0 | 1 | 0 | 2 | 0 | 0 | 1 | 0 | 1 | 0 | 5 |

Player percentages
| South Korea | | Norway | |
|---|---|---|---|
| Lee Ki-bok | 84% | Magnus Vågberg | 81% |
| Oh Eun-su | 83% | Magnus Nedregotten | 83% |
| Seong Se-hyeon | 83% | Markus Høiberg | 73% |
| Kim Chang-min | 85% | Steffen Walstad | 80% |
| Total | 84% | Total | 79% |

| Sheet D | 1 | 2 | 3 | 4 | 5 | 6 | 7 | 8 | 9 | 10 | Final |
|---|---|---|---|---|---|---|---|---|---|---|---|
| Canada (Gushue) | 1 | 1 | 0 | 0 | 0 | 1 | 0 | 2 | 0 | 1 | 6 |
| United States (Ruohonen) | 0 | 0 | 0 | 1 | 0 | 0 | 2 | 0 | 1 | 0 | 4 |

Player percentages
| Canada | | United States | |
|---|---|---|---|
| Geoff Walker | 88% | Philip Tilker | 80% |
| Brett Gallant | 73% | Colin Hufman | 79% |
| Mark Nichols | 93% | Rich Ruohonen | 85% |
| Brad Gushue | 91% | Greg Persinger | 81% |
| Total | 86% | Total | 81% |

=== Semifinal 1 ===
Saturday, April 7, 13:30

| Sheet C | 1 | 2 | 3 | 4 | 5 | 6 | 7 | 8 | 9 | 10 | 11 | Final |
|---|---|---|---|---|---|---|---|---|---|---|---|---|
| Sweden (Edin) | 1 | 0 | 0 | 3 | 0 | 0 | 2 | 0 | 2 | 0 | 1 | 9 |
| South Korea (Kim) | 0 | 1 | 1 | 0 | 2 | 2 | 0 | 1 | 0 | 1 | 0 | 8 |

Player percentages
| Sweden | | South Korea | |
|---|---|---|---|
| Christoffer Sundgren | 76% | Lee Ki-bok | 87% |
| Rasmus Wranå | 84% | Oh Eun-su | 83% |
| Oskar Eriksson | 97% | Seong Se-hyeon | 75% |
| Niklas Edin | 83% | Kim Chang-min | 70% |
| Total | 85% | Total | 79% |

=== Semifinal 2 ===
Saturday, April 7, 18:30

| Sheet C | 1 | 2 | 3 | 4 | 5 | 6 | 7 | 8 | 9 | 10 | Final |
|---|---|---|---|---|---|---|---|---|---|---|---|
| Scotland (Mouat) | 2 | 0 | 0 | 2 | 0 | 1 | 0 | 0 | 0 | X | 5 |
| Canada (Gushue) | 0 | 2 | 1 | 0 | 1 | 0 | 3 | 1 | 1 | X | 9 |

Player percentages
| Scotland | | Canada | |
|---|---|---|---|
| Hammy McMillan Jr. | 92% | Geoff Walker | 79% |
| Bobby Lammie | 82% | Brett Gallant | 88% |
| Grant Hardie | 86% | Mark Nichols | 82% |
| Bruce Mouat | 65% | Brad Gushue | 94% |
| Total | 81% | Total | 86% |

=== Bronze medal game ===
Sunday, April 8, 12:00

| Team | 1 | 2 | 3 | 4 | 5 | 6 | 7 | 8 | 9 | 10 | Final |
|---|---|---|---|---|---|---|---|---|---|---|---|
| Scotland (Mouat) | 1 | 0 | 3 | 2 | 4 | 0 | 1 | 0 | X | X | 11 |
| South Korea (Kim) | 0 | 2 | 0 | 0 | 0 | 1 | 0 | 1 | X | X | 4 |

Player percentages
| Scotland | | South Korea | |
|---|---|---|---|
| Hammy McMillan Jr. | 71% | Lee Ki-bok | 100% |
| Bobby Lammie | 97% | Oh Eun-su | 85% |
| Grant Hardie | 89% | Seong Se-hyeon | 65% |
| Bruce Mouat | 92% | Kim Chang-min | 72% |
| Total | 87% | Total | 80% |

=== Gold medal game ===
Sunday, April 8, 17:00

| Team | 1 | 2 | 3 | 4 | 5 | 6 | 7 | 8 | 9 | 10 | Final |
|---|---|---|---|---|---|---|---|---|---|---|---|
| Sweden (Edin) | 0 | 0 | 2 | 2 | 1 | 0 | 2 | 0 | X | X | 7 |
| Canada (Gushue) | 0 | 0 | 0 | 0 | 0 | 1 | 0 | 2 | X | X | 3 |

Player percentages
| Sweden | | Canada | |
|---|---|---|---|
| Christoffer Sundgren | 88% | Geoff Walker | 88% |
| Rasmus Wranå | 92% | Brett Gallant | 94% |
| Oskar Eriksson | 88% | Mark Nichols | 91% |
| Niklas Edin | 95% | Brad Gushue | 80% |
| Total | 91% | Total | 88% |

== Statistics ==
=== Top 5 player percentages ===
Round robin only

| Leads | % |
|---|---|
| (Canada) Geoff Walker | 91 |
| (Scotland) Hammy McMillan Jr. | 91 |
| (Sweden) Christoffer Sundgren | 90 |
| (Norway) Magnus Vågberg | 90 |
| (South Korea) Lee Ki-bok | 89 |

| Seconds | % |
|---|---|
| (Scotland) Bobby Lammie | 88 |
| (Norway) Magnus Nedregotten | 88 |
| (Sweden) Rasmus Wranå | 87 |
| (Canada) Brett Gallant | 86 |
| (South Korea) Oh Eun-su | 85 |

| Thirds | % |
|---|---|
| (Canada) Mark Nichols | 87 |
| (Sweden) Oskar Eriksson | 86 |
| (United States) Rich Ruohonen (Skip) | 86 |
| (Norway) Markus Høiberg | 85 |
| (Scotland) Grant Hardie | 84 |

| Skips | % |
|---|---|
| (Sweden) Niklas Edin | 90 |
| (Canada) Brad Gushue | 85 |
| (United States) Greg Persinger (Fourth) | 83 |
| (Scotland) Bruce Mouat | 82 |
| (Norway) Steffen Walstad | 82 |

=== Perfect games ===
| Player | Team | Position | Opponent |
|---|---|---|---|
| Lee Ki-bok | South Korea | Lead | China |
| Lee Ki-bok | South Korea | Lead | Scotland |
| Evgeny Klimov | Russia | Lead | Sweden |
| Evgeny Klimov | Russia | Lead | South Korea |
| Hammy McMillan Jr. | Scotland | Lead | China |
| Shao Zhilin | China | Lead | Scotland |
| Daniel Herberg | Germany | Second | Scotland |
| Magnus Nedregotten | Norway | Second | Scotland |
| Seong Se-hyeon | South Korea | Third | Russia |
