= Yutaka Aoyama (curler) =

Japanese male curler

- Curler ♂
- Born: September 21, 1984 (age 42)

Team
- Curling club: Sapporo Curling Association

Curling career
- Member Association: Japan
- World Championship: 1 (2018)
Medal record
Curling
Japan Men's Championship
Gold medal – first place	2018 Nayoro

Yutaka Aoyama (青山 豊, Aoyama Yutaka; born September 21, 1984) is a Japanese male curler.

At the national level, he is a 2018 Japan men's champion curler.

== Teams ==
Season	Skip	Third	Second	Lead	Alternate	Coach	Events
2017–18	Go Aoki (fourth)	Masaki Iwai (skip)	Ryotaro Shukuya	Yutaka Aoyama	Koji Nisato (WCC)	J. D. Lind (WCC)	JMCC 2018 (gold); WCC 2018 (11th)
2018–19	Tomonori Matsuzawa	Yutaka Aoyama	Denis Petropav	Keisuke Akutagawa	Kazuo Sugai		JMCC 2019 (8th)
