= Go Aoki =

Japanese curler (born 1999)

- Curler
- Born: December 6, 1999 (age 26)

Team
- Mixed doubles partner: Tori Koana

Curling career
- Member Association: Japan
- World Championship: 1 (2018)
- World Mixed Doubles Championship: 2 (2026, 2027)
- Other appearances: Asian Winter Games: 1 (2025); World Junior-B Championships: 4 (2016, 2018, 2019 (Jan), 2019 (Dec)
Medal record
Curling
Representing Japan
Asian Winter Games
Gold medal – first place	2025 Harbin	Mixed doubles
Japan Men's Championship
Gold medal – first place	2018 Nayoro
Silver medal – second place	2022 Tokoro
Bronze medal – third place	2019 Sapporo

Go Aoki (青木 豪, Aoki Gō; born December 6, 1999) is a Japanese male curler.

At the national level, he is a 2018 Japan men's champion curler. He is also a 2025 Asian Winter Games gold medalist, where he represented Japan with curling teammate Tori Koana.

== Career ==
=== Men's ===
Aoki would find success in men's curling while still of Junior eligibility, throwing fourth stones on team Masaki Iwai, where they won the 2018 Japan Men's Curling Championship and qualified to represent Japan at the 2018 World Men's Curling Championship. At the World Men's, the team would finish the round robin with a 3–9 record, finishing in 11th. Aoki would continue to play in men's events, notably winning silver at the 2022 Japan Curling Championships, but would start to focus on mixed doubles with teammate Tori Koana during the 2024–25 curling season.

=== Mixed doubles ===
Aoki started curling with Tori Koana in mixed doubles in 2021, where they found success, finishing third at the 2021 Japan Mixed Doubles Curling Championship. Koana and Aoki would continue to find success nationally, finishing second at the 2023 and 2025 national championships, as well as winning multiple events on the world mixed doubles tour. Koana and Aoki first represented Japan in mixed doubles at the 2025 Asian Winter Games, where they won the gold medal, beating South Korea 7–6 in the final.

Koana and Aoki would win their first mixed doubles national title at the 2025 Japanese Olympic mixed doubles curling trials, defeating both the 2024 (Miyu Ueno & Tsuyoshi Yamaguchi) and 2025 (Chiaki Matsumura & Yasumasa Tanida) Japanese mixed doubles champions to win. This gave Koana and Aoki the right to represent Japan at the Olympic Qualification Event where they will need to finish in the top two to qualify for the 2026 Winter Olympics in Cortina d'Ampezzo, Italy.

== Teams ==
Season	Skip	Third	Second	Lead	Alternate	Coach	Events
2015–16	Go Aoki (Fourth)	Sora Ebisuya	Kei Kamada	Kazushi Nino (Skip)	Ayato Sasaki	Kozo Ishida	WJBCC 2016 (11th)
2015–16	Go Aoki (Fourth)	Gaku Suzuki (Skip)	Aoi Kobayashi	Shigemi Kikuchi			JMCC 2016 (6th)
2017–18	Go Aoki (Fourth)	Kei Kamada (Skip)	Rinki Shimizuno	Ayato Sasaki	Kazushi Nino	Kozo Ishida, Mami Yamada	WJBCC 2018 (5th)
2017–18	Go Aoki (Fourth)	Masaki Iwai (Skip)	Ryotaro Shukuya	Yutaka Aoyama	Koji Nisato (WCC)	J. D. Lind (WCC)	JMCC 2018 (gold); WCC 2018 (11th)
2018–19	Go Aoki (Fourth)	Kei Kamada (Skip)	Rinki Shimizuno	Ayato Sasaki	Kazushi Nino	Kozo Ishida	WJBCC 2019 (Jan) (11th)
2018–19	Go Aoki (Fourth)	Masaki Iwai (Skip)	Ryotaro Shukuya	Kouki Ogiwara	Kei Kamada (CWC)	Takayuki Doi	CWC/1 (8th); CWC/3 (7th); JMCC 2019 (bronze)
2019–20	Go Aoki (Fourth)	Kei Kamada (Skip)	Kazushi Nino	Ayato Sasaki	Rinki Shimizuno	Takayuki Doi	WJBCC 2019 (Dec) (5th)
2019–20	Go Aoki (Fourth)	Kei Kamada (Skip)	Ayato Sasaki	Kouki Ogiwara			
2021–22	Go Aoki (Fourth)	Hayato Sato (Skip)	Kei Kamada	Kazushi Nino	Ayato Sasaki	Takayuki Doi	
2022–23	Go Aoki (Fourth)	Hayato Sato (Skip)	Kouki Ogiwara	Kazushi Nino	Ayato Sasaki		
2023–24	Go Aoki (Fourth)	Hayato Sato (Skip)	Kouki Ogiwara	Kazushi Nino	Ayato Sasaki		

== Personal life ==
He started curling in 2010 at the age of 11. He attended Sapporo International University.
