= Ryotaro Shukuya =

Japanese male curler

- Curler
- Born: September 6, 1995 (age 31); Sapporo, Japan

Team
- Curling club: Tokoro CC, Kitami
- Skip: Takumi Maeda
- Third: Hiroki Maeda
- Second: Uryu Kamikawa
- Lead: Gakuto Tokoro
- Alternate: Ryotaro Shukuya

Curling career
- Member Association: Japan
- World Championship: 1 (2018)
- Pacific-Asia Championship: 1 (2021)
Medal record
Men's curling
Representing Japan
Pacific-Asia Championships
| Silver medal – second place | 2021 Almaty |
Representing Hokkaido
Japan Curling Championships
| Gold medal – first place | 2018 Nayoro |
| Bronze medal – third place | 2019 Sapporo |
Representing Nagano
Japan Curling Championships
| Silver medal – second place | 2020 Karuizawa |
| Silver medal – second place | 2026 Yokohama |
| Bronze medal – third place | 2021 Wakkanai |

Ryotaro Shukuya (宿谷 涼太郎, Shukutani Ryōtarō), born September 6, 1995 in Hokkaido, Japan, is a Japanese male curler from Sapporo.

At the national level, he is a 2018 Japan men's champion curler.

== National career ==
Shukuya has won medals four times at the Japan Curling Championships, A gold medal in 2018, and a bronze medal in 2019 in teams representing Hokkaido, and a silver medal in 2020, and a bronze medal in 2021 in teams representing Nagano.

== International career ==
At the national level, Shukuya represented Japan at the 2021 Pacific Asia Championships, where his team won a silver medal.

== Teams ==
| Season | Skip | Third | Second | Lead | Alternate | Coach | Events |
|---|---|---|---|---|---|---|---|
| 2017–18 | Go Aoki (fourth) | Masaki Iwai (skip) | Ryotaro Shukuya | Yutaka Aoyama | Koji Nisato (WCC) | J. D. Lind (WCC) | JMCC 2018 (gold); WCC 2018 (11th) |
| 2018–19 | Go Aoki (fourth) | Masaki Iwai (skip) | Ryotaro Shukuya | Kouki Ogiwara | Kei Kamada (CWC) | Takayuki Doi | CWC/1 (8th); CWC/3 (7th); JMCC 2019 (bronze) |
| 2019–20 | Yusuke Morozumi | Masaki Iwai | Ryotaro Shukuya | Kosuke Morozumi | | | |
| 2020–21 | Yusuke Morozumi | Masaki Iwai | Ryotaro Shukuya | Kosuke Morozumi | | | |
| 2021–22 | Yusuke Morozumi | Masaki Iwai | Ryotaro Shukuya | Kosuke Morozumi | | | PACC 2021 (silver) |
| 2022–23 | Yusuke Morozumi | Yuta Matsumura | Ryotaro Shukuya | Kosuke Morozumi | Masaki Iwai | | |
| 2023–24 | Yusuke Morozumi | Yuta Matsumura | Ryotaro Shukuya | Masaki Iwai | Kosuke Morozumi | | |
| 2024–25 | Yusuke Morozumi | Yuta Matsumura | Ryotaro Shukuya | Masaki Iwai | Kosuke Morozumi | | |
