= Masaki Iwai =

Japanese curler

- Curler
- Born: 31 July 1985 (age 41); Hyogo Prefecture, Japan

Team
- Skip: Yusuke Morozumi
- Third: Yuta Matsumura
- Second: Ryotaro Shukuya
- Lead: Masaki Iwai
- Alternate: Kosuke Morozumi

Curling career
- Member Association: Japan
- World Championship: 1 (2018)
- Pacific-Asia Championship: 1 (2021)
Medal record
Representing Japan
Pacific-Asia Championships
Silver medal – second place	2021 Almaty

Masaki Iwai (岩井 真幸, Iwai Masaki; born July 31, 1985) is a Japanese curler from Takarazuka, Hyōgo.

After winning the 2018 Japanese curling championship, Iwai skipped the Japan national team at the 2018 World Men's Curling Championship. Iwai threw third stones on the team which also consisted of fourth Go Aoki, second Ruyotaro Shukuya and lead Yutaka Aoyama. Iwai led the team to a 3-9 round robin record, an 11th-place finish.

Iwai began the 2018-19 curling season by winning the Hokkaido Bank Curling Classic, his first World Curling Tour event win.
