= List of Asian Games medalists in curling =

This is the complete list of Asian Winter Games medalists in curling from 2003 to 2025.

== Events ==
=== Men's team ===
Games	Gold	Silver	Bronze
2003 Aomori	South Korea (KOR); Lee Dong-keun; Kim Soo-hyuk; Park Jae-cheol; Choi Min-suk; Ko Seung-wan	Japan (JPN); Hiroaki Kashiwagi; Keita Yanagizawa; Jun Nakayama; Kazuto Yanagizawa; Takanori Ichimura	China (CHN); Wang Binjiang; Wang Fengchun; Ma Yongjun; Xu Xiaoming; Wang Haicheng
2007 Changchun	South Korea (KOR); Lee Jae-ho; Beak Jong-chul; Yang Se-young; Kwon Young-il; Park Kwon-il	Japan (JPN); Hiroaki Kashiwagi; Jun Nakayama; Takanori Ichimura; Yoichi Nakasato; Yuki Sakamoto	China (CHN); Wang Binjiang; Wang Fengchun; Liu Rui; Xu Xiaoming; Zang Jialiang
2017 Sapporo	China (CHN); Liu Rui; Xu Xiaoming; Ba Dexin; Zang Jialiang; Zou Qiang	Japan (JPN); Yusuke Morozumi; Tetsuro Shimizu; Tsuyoshi Yamaguchi; Kosuke Morozumi; Kosuke Hirata	South Korea (KOR); Kim Soo-hyuk; Park Jong-duk; Kim Tae-hwan; Nam Yoon-ho; Yoo Min-hyeon
2025 Harbin	Philippines (PHI); Marc Pfister; Christian Haller; Enrico Pfister; Alan Frei; Benjo Delarmente	South Korea (KOR); Lee Jae-beom; Kim Hyo-jun; Kim Eun-bin; Pyo Jeong-min; Kim Jin-hun	China (CHN); Xu Xiaoming; Fei Xueqing; Wang Zhiyu; Li Zhichao; Ye Jianjun

=== Women's team ===
Games	Gold	Silver	Bronze
2003 Aomori	Japan (JPN); Shinobu Aota; Yukari Okazaki; Eriko Minatoya; Kotomi Ishizaki; Satomi Tsujii	South Korea (KOR); Kim Mi-yeon; Park Ji-hyun; Shin Mi-sung; Lee Hyun-jung; Park Kyung-mi	China (CHN); Zhao Zhenzhen; Liu Yin; Zhan Jing; Yue Qingshuang; Wang Bingyu
2007 Changchun	South Korea (KOR); Jeong Jin-sook; Kim Ji-suk; Park Mi-hee; Lee Hye-in; Ju Yun-hoa	Japan (JPN); Yukako Tsuchiya; Junko Sonobe; Tomoko Sonobe; Mitsuki Sato; Miyuki Sato	China (CHN); Liu Yin; Wang Bingyu; Yue Qingshuang; Zhou Yan; Sun Yue
2017 Sapporo	China (CHN); Wang Bingyu; Wang Rui; Liu Jinli; Zhou Yan; Yang Ying	South Korea (KOR); Kim Eun-jung; Kim Kyeong-ae; Kim Seon-yeong; Kim Yeong-mi	Japan (JPN); Satsuki Fujisawa; Mari Motohashi; Chinami Yoshida; Yurika Yoshida; Yumi Suzuki
2025 Harbin	South Korea (KOR); Gim Eun-ji; Kim Min-ji; Kim Su-ji; Seol Ye-eun; Seol Ye-ji	China (CHN); Wang Rui; Han Yu; Dong Ziqi; Jiang Jiayi; Su Tingyu	Japan (JPN); Yuina Miura; Suzune Yasui; Yuna Sakuma; Ai Matsunaga; Hana Ikeda

=== Mixed doubles ===
Games	Gold	Silver	Bronze
2025 Harbin	Japan (JPN); Tori Koana; Go Aoki	South Korea (KOR); Kim Kyeong-ae; Seong Ji-hoon	China (CHN); Han Yu; Wang Zhiyu
