= Curling at the 2007 Asian Winter Games – Men's team =

Men's team at the 2007 Asian Winter Games
- Venue: Changchun Municipal Skating Rink
- Dates: 29 January – 1 February 2007
- Competitors: 20 from 4 nations

Medalists
gold medal	South Korea; Lee Jae-ho, Beak Jong-chul, Yang Se-young, Kwon Young-il, Park Kwon-il
silver medal	Japan; Hiroaki Kashiwagi, Jun Nakayama, Takanori Ichimura, Yoichi Nakasato, Yuki Sakamoto
bronze medal	China; Wang Binjiang, Wang Fengchun, Liu Rui, Xu Xiaoming, Zang Jialiang

The men's curling at the 2007 Asian Winter Games was held from January 29 to February 1, 2007 at Changchun Municipal Skating Rink, China.

Four teams participated in this competition. The first seed South Korea won the gold medal after beating Japan in the final, China took the bronze.

== Squads ==
China	Japan	Kazakhstan	South Korea
Wang Binjiang; Wang Fengchun; Liu Rui; Xu Xiaoming; Zang Jialiang	Hiroaki Kashiwagi; Jun Nakayama; Takanori Ichimura; Yoichi Nakasato; Yuki Sakamoto	Viktor Kim; Bashir Chimirov; Vladislav Kogay; Zhanibek Ukubayev; Arman Kassenov	Lee Jae-ho; Beak Jong-chul; Yang Se-young; Kwon Young-il; Park Kwon-il

== Results ==
All times are China Standard Time (UTC+08:00)

=== Preliminary ===
Pos	Team	Skip	Pld	W	L	W–L	PF	PA	DSC	Qualification
1	South Korea	Lee Jae-ho	6	4	2	2–2	45	29	197.3	Gold medal match
2	Japan	Hiroaki Kashiwagi	6	4	2	2–2	44	25	302.7	Semifinal
3	China	Wang Binjiang	6	4	2	2–2	44	20	358.6	Semifinal
4	Kazakhstan	Viktor Kim	6	0	6	—	6	65	—	

Source: Official website

29 January, 9:30

Sheet A	1	2	3	4	5	6	7	8	9	10	Final
China	0	2	3	2	1	2	X	X	X	X	10
Kazakhstan 🔨	1	0	0	0	0	0	X	X	X	X	1

Sheet B	1	2	3	4	5	6	7	8	9	10	Final
South Korea	0	0	0	1	0	3	0	1	0	0	5
Japan 🔨	1	0	1	0	1	0	2	0	2	2	9

29 January, 15:30

Sheet C	1	2	3	4	5	6	7	8	9	10	Final
Japan	0	0	0	1	0	1	0	X	X	X	2
China 🔨	1	1	2	0	1	0	3	X	X	X	8

Sheet D	1	2	3	4	5	6	7	8	9	10	Final
Kazakhstan	0	0	1	0	0	1	0	X	X	X	2
South Korea 🔨	4	1	0	2	1	0	2	X	X	X	10

30 January, 9:30

Sheet A	1	2	3	4	5	6	7	8	9	10	Final
Kazakhstan	0	0	0	0	0	0	X	X	X	X	0
Japan 🔨	2	1	1	1	1	3	X	X	X	X	9

Sheet B	1	2	3	4	5	6	7	8	9	10	Final
China	0	2	0	0	0	1	1	0	0	2	6
South Korea 🔨	1	0	0	0	2	0	0	0	1	0	4

30 January, 15:30

Sheet C	1	2	3	4	5	6	7	8	9	10	Final
China	0	0	1	0	0	1	0	0	1	0	3
Japan 🔨	0	0	0	0	0	0	1	1	0	2	4

Sheet D	1	2	3	4	5	6	7	8	9	10	Final
South Korea	2	0	2	1	2	1	2	0	X	X	10
Kazakhstan 🔨	0	1	0	0	0	0	0	0	X	X	1

31 January, 9:30

Sheet A	1	2	3	4	5	6	7	8	9	10	Final
South Korea	1	3	0	1	0	1	0	0	1	1	8
China 🔨	0	0	2	0	1	0	2	1	0	0	6

Sheet B	1	2	3	4	5	6	7	8	9	10	Final
Japan	1	0	2	2	4	2	3	1	X	X	15
Kazakhstan 🔨	0	1	0	0	0	0	0	0	X	X	1

31 January, 15:30

Sheet C	1	2	3	4	5	6	7	8	9	10	Final
Japan	0	0	1	0	1	1	0	0	2	0	5
South Korea 🔨	1	1	0	2	0	0	1	2	0	1	8

Sheet D	1	2	3	4	5	6	7	8	9	10	Final
Kazakhstan	0	1	0	0	0	0	X	X	X	X	1
China 🔨	3	0	2	3	1	2	X	X	X	X	11

=== Knockout round ===
Semifinal			Gold medal match
			1	South Korea	3
2	Japan	8	2	Japan	2
3	China	4

==== Semifinal ====
1 February, 9:00

Sheet D	1	2	3	4	5	6	7	8	9	10	Final
China	0	0	2	0	0	1	0	0	1	0	4
Japan 🔨	0	1	0	1	1	0	1	1	0	3	8

==== Gold medal match ====
1 February, 14:30

Sheet B	1	2	3	4	5	6	7	8	9	10	11	Final
South Korea 🔨	1	0	0	0	0	0	0	1	0	0	1	3
Japan	0	0	0	0	0	1	0	0	0	1	0	2

== Final standing ==
Rank	Team	Pld	W	L
1st place, gold medalist(s)	South Korea	7	5	2
2nd place, silver medalist(s)	Japan	8	5	3
3rd place, bronze medalist(s)	China	7	4	3
4	Kazakhstan	6	0	6
