= Curling at the 2009 New Zealand Winter Games =

- Venue: Maniototo Curling Rink
- Dates: 23–29 August 2009
- Competitors: 60 from 8 nations

Medalists
gold medal	Hugh Millikin; Ian Palangio; John Theriault; Steve Johns	Australia
gold medal	Moe Meguro; Mari Motohashi; Mayo Yamaura; Kotomi Ishizaki; Anna Ohmiya	Japan
silver medal	Li Hongchen; Wang Fengchun; Xu Xiaoming; Liu Rui; Zang Jialiang	China
silver medal	Wang Bingyu; Liu Yin; Yue Qingshuang; Zhou Yan; Liu Jinlu	China
bronze medal	Yusuke Morozumi; Tsuyoshi Yamaguchi; Tetsuro Shimizu; Kosuke Morozumi	Japan
bronze medal	Kim Yeo-myeong; Kang Yoo-ri; Park Min-a; Kyeong Een-jeong; Kim Ji-suk	South Korea

The curling competition of the 2009 New Zealand Winter Games was held at the Maniototo Curling Rink in Naseby, New Zealand. Both the men's and women's competitions concluded on 29 August 2009. In the men's event Australia won gold after defeating China in the final, while in the women's event Japan won the gold, also beating China in the final.

== Overview ==
The curling competition was held from 23 August to 29 August 2009 at the Maniototo Curling Rink in Naseby, New Zealand. It comprised a men's competition and a women's competition. Following the finals of both competitions an on-ice closing ceremony and medal presentation was held and then later an awards dinner.

The men's competition comprised a single round-robin format followed by a playoff round. Each team competed once against the other nations. At the end of the seven game each round-robin the top four nations progress to the playoff round. Japan, South Korea and Australia qualified after finishing first, second and third respectively. The fourth team through had to be determined with a tie-breaker game after China and the United States finished the round-robin finished with the same number of wins. China won the tie-breaker 9–6 and advanced to the semi-final. In the first semi-final Australia was drawn against South Korea. Australia won the semi-final 8–5 and progressed to the gold medal final while South Korea moved to the bronze medal final. China won the second semi-final against Japan with a score of 11–3, moving on to the gold medal final and Japan to the bronze medal final. Japan defeated South Korea in the bronze medal game 10–7 while in the gold medal game Australia defeated China 9–6.

The women's competition comprised a double round-robin format followed by a playoff round. Each team competed twice against the other nations. At the end of the eight game each round-robin the top four nations progress to the playoff round. China finished first in the round-robin and was drawn against fourth place New Zealand, while second placed Japan was drawn against South Korea. In the first semi-final Japan defeated South Korea 6–5 with Japan advancing to the gold medal final and South Korea moving on to the bronze medal final. China won the second semi-final defeating New Zealand with a score of 7–4 to move on to the gold medal game and New Zealand moved on to the bronze medal game. South Korea defeated New Zealand in the bronze medal game 12–7 while in the gold medal game Japan defeated China 8–5.

=== Medal table ===
Rank	Nation	Gold	Silver	Bronze	Total
1	Japan (JPN)	1	0	1	2
2	Australia (AUS)	1	0	0	1
3	China (CHN)	0	2	0	2
4	South Korea (KOR)	0	0	1	1
Totals (4 entries)		2	2	2	6

== Teams ==
=== Men ===
Australia	Canada	China	Czech Republic
Skip: Hugh Millikin Third: Ian Palangio; Second: John Theriault; Lead: Steve Johns	Skip: Cliff Butchko Third: Brian Carnahan; Second: Trevor Baker; Lead: Brent Vanderlinden	Skip: Li Hongchen Third: Wang Fengchun; Second: Xu Xiaoming; Lead: Liu Rui; Alternate: Zang Jialiang	Skip: Karel Kubeska Third: Jan Letal; Second: Jiri Candra; Lead: Zdenek Krampera; Alternate: Leos Fiala
Japan	South Korea	New Zealand	United States
Skip: Yusuke Morozumi Third: Tsuyoshi Yamaguchi; Second: Tetsuro Shimizu; Lead: Kosuke Morozumi	Skip: Kim Chang-min Third: Kim Min-chan; Second: Lim Myung-sup; Lead: Jeong Tae-yeon; Alternate: Seong Se-hyeon	Skip: Dan Mustapic Third: Scott Becker; Second: Warren Kearney; Lead: Warren Dobson; Alternate: Kris Miller	Skip: Herod Roland Third: Richard Maskel; Second: John Lilla; Lead: Adam Nathan

=== Women ===
Australia	China	Japan	South Korea	New Zealand
Skip: Kim Forge Third: Laurie Weeden; Second: Lyn Gill; Lead: Madeleine Wilson	Skip: Wang Bingyu Third: Liu Yin; Second: Yue Qingshuang; Lead: Zhou Yan; Alternate: Liu Jinlu	Skip: Moe Meguro Third: Mari Motohashi; Second: Mayo Yamaura; Lead: Kotomi Ishizaki; Alternate: Anna Ohmiya	Skip: Kim Yeo-myeong Third: Kang Yoo-ri; Second: Park Min-a; Lead: Kyeong Een-jeong; Alternate: Kim Ji-suk	Skip: Bridget Becker Third: Brydie Donald; Second: Marissa Jones; Lead: Linda Geary; Alternate: Lucy Lane

== Men's tournament ==
=== Round robin standings ===
Final round robin standings

Key
Teams to Playoffs
Teams to Tiebreakers

Country	GP	W	L	PF	PA	EW	EL
Japan (JPN)	7	6	1	56	31	30	23
South Korea (KOR)	7	5	2	49	37	31	26
Australia (AUS)	7	5	2	46	34	31	26
China (CHN)	7	4	3	49	33	31	26
United States (USA)	7	4	3	42	37	28	22
New Zealand (NZL)	7	2	5	35	56	25	33
Canada (CAN)	7	1	6	37	60	27	32
Czech Republic (CZE)	7	1	6	32	58	19	35

=== Round robin results ===
==== Round 1 ====
23 August 2009, 14:00

Sheet A	1	2	3	4	5	6	7	8	9	10	Final
Canada (Butchko)	0	0	2	0	1	0	1	0	X	X	3
South Korea (Kim)	2	2	0	4	0	1	0	1	X	X	10

Sheet C	1	2	3	4	5	6	7	8	9	10	Final
Czech Republic (Kubeska)	0	1	0	0	1	0	2	0	2	0	6
New Zealand (Mustapic)	1	0	0	1	0	1	0	2	0	2	7

Sheet B	1	2	3	4	5	6	7	8	9	10	Final
Japan (Morozumi)	0	1	0	0	0	1	0	0	1	X	3
Australia (Millikin)	0	0	0	2	1	0	1	1	0	X	5

Sheet D	1	2	3	4	5	6	7	8	9	10	Final
China (Li)	2	2	0	1	0	1	0	2	0	X	8
United States (Roland)	0	0	1	0	1	0	1	0	1	X	4

==== Round 2 ====
24 August 2009, 08:00

Sheet A	1	2	3	4	5	6	7	8	9	10	Final
New Zealand (Mustapic)	0	1	0	0	2	0	2	0	0	X	5
United States (Roland)	1	0	0	2	0	2	0	4	0	X	9

Sheet C	1	2	3	4	5	6	7	8	9	10	Final
South Korea (Kim)	2	0	1	2	1	0	0	1	1	X	8
Australia (Millikin)	0	1	0	0	0	1	3	0	0	X	5

Sheet B	1	2	3	4	5	6	7	8	9	10	Final
Czech Republic (Kubeska)	0	0	1	0	0	0	X	X	X	X	1
China (Li)	1	2	0	2	1	4	X	X	X	X	10

Sheet D	1	2	3	4	5	6	7	8	9	10	Final
Canada (Butchko)	1	0	2	0	1	0	0	2	0	X	6
Japan (Morozumi)	0	3	0	2	0	2	3	0	2	X	12

==== Round 3 ====
24 August 2009, 16:00

Sheet A	1	2	3	4	5	6	7	8	9	10	Final
Czech Republic (Kubeska)	0	1	0	0	0	1	X	X	X	X	2
Australia (Millikin)	1	0	2	3	4	0	X	X	X	X	10

Sheet C	1	2	3	4	5	6	7	8	9	10	Final
China (Li)	2	0	0	2	0	1	0	2	0	0	7
Japan (Morozumi)	0	1	2	0	2	0	0	0	2	1	8

Sheet B	1	2	3	4	5	6	7	8	9	10	Final
Canada (Butchko)	0	1	0	0	0	0	0	1	X	X	2
United States (Roland)	2	0	1	0	1	0	2	0	X	X	6

Sheet D	1	2	3	4	5	6	7	8	9	10	Final
South Korea (Kim)	1	3	0	0	2	0	3	0	X	X	9
New Zealand (Mustapic)	0	0	1	1	0	1	0	1	X	X	4

==== Round 4 ====
25 August 2009, 13:00

Sheet A	1	2	3	4	5	6	7	8	9	10	Final
Japan (Morozumi)	3	1	0	0	4	0	0	3	X	X	11
New Zealand (Mustapic)	0	0	0	2	0	1	1	0	X	X	4

Sheet C	1	2	3	4	5	6	7	8	9	10	Final
Canada (Butchko)	0	1	0	2	2	0	0	2	0	X	7
Czech Republic (Kubeska)	1	0	1	0	0	2	3	0	4	X	11

Sheet B	1	2	3	4	5	6	7	8	9	10	Final
China (Li)	1	0	0	2	0	1	0	0	0	0	4
South Korea (Kim)	0	0	2	0	1	0	1	0	0	1	5

Sheet D	1	2	3	4	5	6	7	8	9	10	Final
United States (Roland)	0	0	1	1	0	1	0	0	0	X	3
Australia (Millikin)	1	1	0	0	1	0	0	0	2	X	5

==== Round 5 ====
26 August 2009, 09:00

Sheet A	1	2	3	4	5	6	7	8	9	10	Final
China (Li)	0	2	0	1	0	0	0	2	1	0	6
Canada (Butchko)	1	0	1	0	1	1	3	0	0	0	7

Sheet C	1	2	3	4	5	6	7	8	9	10	Final
Japan (Morozumi)	0	0	0	0	0	3	0	3	0	X	6
United States (Roland)	0	0	0	1	1	0	0	0	1	X	3

Sheet B	1	2	3	4	5	6	7	8	9	10	Final
Australia (Millikin)	1	1	0	1	1	0	0	2	1	1	8
New Zealand (Mustapic)	0	0	1	0	0	1	3	0	0	0	5

Sheet D	1	2	3	4	5	6	7	8	9	10	Final
Czech Republic (Kubeska)	0	0	1	0	0	3	0	0	0	X	4
South Korea (Kim)	2	1	0	1	1	0	0	2	1	X	8

==== Round 6 ====
26 August 2009, 17:00

Sheet A	1	2	3	4	5	6	7	8	9	10	Final
South Korea (Kim)	0	0	0	1	1	0	0	2	0	0	4
Japan (Morozumi)	2	0	0	0	0	2	2	0	1	1	8

Sheet C	1	2	3	4	5	6	7	8	9	10	Final
Australia (Millikin)	2	0	2	0	1	0	0	3	0	1	9
Canada (Butchko)	0	2	0	1	0	0	1	0	3	0	7

Sheet B	1	2	3	4	5	6	7	8	9	10	Final
United States (Roland)	0	0	0	1	2	0	0	3	1	1	8
Czech Republic (Kubeska)	0	0	2	0	0	3	1	0	0	0	6

Sheet D	1	2	3	4	5	6	7	8	9	10	Final
New Zealand (Mustapic)	2	0	0	0	1	0	0	1	0	X	4
China (Li)	0	2	1	2	0	2	0	0	1	X	8

==== Round 7 ====
27 August 2009, 13:00

Sheet A	1	2	3	4	5	6	7	8	9	10	Final
Australia (Millikin)	1	0	1	0	0	1	0	0	1	0	4
China (Li)	0	1	0	1	1	0	2	0	0	1	6

Sheet C	1	2	3	4	5	6	7	8	9	10	Final
United States (Roland)	0	2	0	1	1	0	2	0	3	X	9
South Korea (Kim)	2	0	2	0	0	0	0	1	0	X	5

Sheet B	1	2	3	4	5	6	7	8	9	10	Final
New Zealand (Mustapic)	0	0	1	0	0	2	1	0	2	0	6
Canada (Butchko)	1	0	0	1	1	0	0	1	0	1	5

Sheet D	1	2	3	4	5	6	7	8	9	10	Final
Japan (Morozumi)	1	1	1	3	0	1	1	0	X	X	8
Czech Republic (Kubeska)	0	0	0	0	1	0	0	1	X	X	2

=== Tiebreaker ===
Owing to both China and the United States finishing with the same number of wins after the end of the round robin, a tiebreaker game was required to determine the fourth team to advance to the semi-final round. China won the game 9–6 and advanced to the second semi-final game against Japan.

28 August 2009, 08:00

Sheet B	1	2	3	4	5	6	7	8	9	10	Final
China (Li)	3	0	1	1	0	1	0	2	0	1	9
United States (Roland)	0	1	0	0	1	0	1	0	3	0	6

=== Playoffs ===
Semifinals
1	Japan	3
4	China	11
2	South Korea	5
3	Australia	8

Gold Medal Game
4	China	6
3	Australia	9
Bronze Medal Game
1	Japan	10
2	South Korea	7

==== Semifinals ====
28 August 2009, 11:45

Sheet B	1	2	3	4	5	6	7	8	9	10	Final
Australia (Millikin)	0	0	1	1	1	0	2	2	1	X	8
South Korea (Kim)	3	0	0	0	0	2	0	0	0	X	5

28 August 2009, 15:00

Sheet D	1	2	3	4	5	6	7	8	9	10	Final
Japan (Morozumi)	0	1	0	0	1	0	1	0	X	X	3
China (Li)	0	0	2	4	0	3	0	2	X	X	11

==== Bronze medal final ====
29 August 2009, 13:45

Sheet D	1	2	3	4	5	6	7	8	9	10	Final
Japan (Morozumi)	2	0	4	0	2	0	1	1	0	X	10
South Korea (Kim)	0	1	0	2	0	2	0	0	2	X	7

==== Gold medal final ====
29 August 2009, 13:45

Sheet B	1	2	3	4	5	6	7	8	9	10	Final
China (Li)	0	1	1	0	1	0	3	0	0	0	6
Australia (Millikin)	2	0	0	1	0	3	0	1	1	1	9

== Women's tournament ==
=== Round robin standings ===
Final round robin standings

Key
Teams to Playoffs

Country	GP	W	L	PF	PA	EW	EL
China (CHN)	8	7	1	78	36	41	22
Japan (JPN)	8	6	2	57	39	36	28
South Korea (KOR)	8	5	3	58	50	36	31
New Zealand (NZL)	8	2	6	40	67	27	40
Australia (AUS)	8	0	8	32	73	23	42

=== Round robin results ===
==== Round 1 ====
23 August 2009, 08:45

Sheet B	1	2	3	4	5	6	7	8	9	10	Final
Australia (Forge)	0	0	0	1	0	0	0	X	X	X	1
South Korea (Kim)	2	1	2	0	3	3	3	X	X	X	14

Sheet D	1	2	3	4	5	6	7	8	9	10	Final
Japan (Meguro)	0	1	0	2	0	2	0	2	2	X	9
New Zealand (Becker)	1	0	1	0	1	0	0	0	0	X	3

==== Round 2 ====
23 August 2009, 18:00

Sheet B	1	2	3	4	5	6	7	8	9	10	Final
China (Wang)	1	0	2	6	2	1	X	X	X	X	12
New Zealand (Becker)	0	1	0	0	0	0	X	X	X	X	1

Sheet D	1	2	3	4	5	6	7	8	9	10	11	Final
South Korea (Kim)	0	0	1	0	1	0	1	2	1	0	1	7
Japan (Meguro)	0	1	0	3	0	1	0	0	0	1	0	6

==== Round 3 ====
24 August 2009, 12:00

Sheet B	1	2	3	4	5	6	7	8	9	10	Final
Japan (Meguro)	0	0	2	1	0	1	0	2	2	X	8
Australia (Forge)	0	1	0	0	1	0	1	0	0	X	3

Sheet C	1	2	3	4	5	6	7	8	9	10	Final
China (Wang)	0	2	0	0	1	1	0	3	0	2	9
South Korea (Kim)	2	0	2	1	0	0	1	0	2	0	8

==== Round 4 ====
24 August 2009, 19:30

Sheet B	1	2	3	4	5	6	7	8	9	10	Final
South Korea (Kim)	0	1	0	0	0	0	0	X	X	X	1
Japan (Meguro)	0	0	1	2	1	1	2	X	X	X	7

Sheet D	1	2	3	4	5	6	7	8	9	10	Final
New Zealand (Becker)	0	1	0	0	0	0	0	X	X	X	1
China (Wang)	2	0	4	1	2	1	1	X	X	X	11

==== Round 5 ====
25 August 2009, 09:00

Sheet B	1	2	3	4	5	6	7	8	9	10	Final
Australia (Forge)	1	0	0	1	1	0	1	0	0	X	4
New Zealand (Becker)	0	1	2	0	0	1	0	2	1	X	7

Sheet D	1	2	3	4	5	6	7	8	9	10	Final
China (Wang)	1	0	0	0	0	1	1	0	X	X	3
Japan (Meguro)	0	1	4	1	1	0	0	3	X	X	10

==== Round 6 ====
25 August 2009, 17:00

Sheet B	1	2	3	4	5	6	7	8	9	10	Final
South Korea (Kim)	0	1	0	1	0	0	0	0	X	X	2
China (Wang)	1	0	3	0	2	2	1	3	X	X	12

Sheet D	1	2	3	4	5	6	7	8	9	10	Final
Japan (Meguro)	2	1	0	2	0	1	0	2	0	X	8
Australia (Forge)	0	0	2	0	1	0	2	0	0	X	5

==== Round 7 ====
26 August 2009, 13:00

Sheet B	1	2	3	4	5	6	7	8	9	10	Final
China (Wang)	2	1	2	0	0	0	4	0	X	X	9
Australia (Forge)	0	0	0	1	1	1	0	1	X	X	4

Sheet D	1	2	3	4	5	6	7	8	9	10	Final
South Korea (Kim)	0	1	1	0	0	2	1	2	1	X	8
New Zealand (Becker)	1	0	0	2	2	0	0	0	0	X	5

==== Round 8 ====
26 August 2009, 20:00

Sheet B	1	2	3	4	5	6	7	8	9	10	Final
New Zealand (Becker)	0	1	0	2	0	0	1	0	1	0	5
Japan (Meguro)	1	0	2	0	1	1	0	1	0	1	7

Sheet D	1	2	3	4	5	6	7	8	9	10	Final
Australia (Forge)	0	0	0	1	0	1	0	X	X	X	2
South Korea (Kim)	1	1	1	0	2	0	2	X	X	X	7

==== Round 9 ====
27 August 2009, 09:00

Sheet B	1	2	3	4	5	6	7	8	9	10	Final
New Zealand (Becker)	1	0	3	0	1	0	1	0	2	0	8
South Korea (Kim)	0	3	0	1	0	2	0	1	0	4	11

Sheet D	1	2	3	4	5	6	7	8	9	10	Final
Australia (Forge)	3	2	0	0	0	0	0	0	3	0	8
China (Wang)	0	0	3	1	1	1	1	1	0	2	10

==== Round 10 ====
27 August 2009, 17:00

Sheet B	1	2	3	4	5	6	7	8	9	10	Final
Japan (Meguro)	0	0	0	2	0	0	X	X	X	X	2
China (Wang)	1	3	4	0	3	1	X	X	X	X	12

Sheet D	1	2	3	4	5	6	7	8	9	10	Final
New Zealand (Becker)	2	0	3	1	0	3	0	1	X	X	10
Australia (Forge)	0	2	0	0	2	0	1	0	X	X	5

=== Playoffs ===
Semifinals
1	China	7
4	New Zealand	4
2	Japan	6
3	South Korea	5

Gold Medal Game
1	China	5
2	Japan	8
Bronze Medal Game
4	New Zealand	7
3	South Korea	12

==== Semifinals ====
28 August 2009, 11:45

Sheet D	1	2	3	4	5	6	7	8	9	10	Final
Japan (Meguro)	3	0	0	1	0	0	1	0	0	1	6
South Korea (Kim)	0	1	0	0	2	0	0	2	0	0	5

28 August 2009, 15:00

Sheet B	1	2	3	4	5	6	7	8	9	10	Final
China (Wang)	1	1	0	1	0	1	0	3	0	X	7
New Zealand (Becker)	0	0	1	0	1	0	1	0	1	X	4

==== Bronze medal final ====
29 August 2009 – 09:45

Sheet D	1	2	3	4	5	6	7	8	9	10	Final
South Korea (Kim)	1	1	0	1	3	0	3	0	3	X	12
New Zealand (Becker)	0	0	2	0	0	1	0	4	0	X	7

==== Gold medal final ====
29 August 2009 – 09:45

Sheet B	1	2	3	4	5	6	7	8	9	10	Final
Japan (Meguro)	0	2	0	3	0	1	1	0	1	X	8
China (Wang)	2	0	1	0	1	0	0	1	0	X	5
