= Zhang Xindi =

Chinese curler

- Curler

Team
- Curling club: Harbin CC
- Skip: Wang Bingyu
- Third: Liu Yin
- Second: Yue Qingshuang
- Lead: Zhou Yan
- Alternate: Zhang Xindi

Curling career
- World Championship: 1 (2010)
- World Mixed Doubles Championship: 1 (2008)

Zhang Xindi is a Chinese curler.

She was alternate for the Chinese team at the 2010 Ford World Women's Curling Championship in Swift Current, Canada.
