= Park Kwon-il =

South Korean male curler and coach

- Curler ♂

Team
- Curling club: Gangwon Docheong, Chuncheon

Curling career
- Member Association: South Korea
- World Championship: 1 (2007)
- Pacific-Asia Championship: 5 (1996, 2000, 2004, 2005, 2006)
- Other appearances: Asian Winter Games: 1 (2007)
Medal record
Curling
Pacific-Asia Championships
| Silver medal – second place | 2006 Tokyo |
Asian Winter Games
| Gold medal – first place | 2007 Changchun |

Park Kwon-il is a South Korean male curler and curling coach.

At the international level, he is a 2006 Pacific-Asia silver medallist and a 2007 Asian Winter Games champion curler.

== Teams ==
| Season | Skip | Third | Second | Lead | Alternate | Coach | Events |
|---|---|---|---|---|---|---|---|
| 1996–97 | Park Kwon-il | Song He-dong | Lee Jac-in | Kim Chang-gyu | | | PCC 1996 (4th) |
| 2000–01 | Beak Jong-chul | Kwon Young-il | Lim Sung-min | Park Kwon-il | | | PCC 2000 (4th) |
| 2004–05 | Beak Jong-chul | Lee Jae-ho | Yang Se-young | Park Kwon-il | Kwon Young-il | Jim Ursel, Chung Young Sup | PCC 2004 (5th) |
| 2005–06 | Beak Jong-chul | Lee Jae-ho | Yang Se-young | Kwon Young-il | Park Kwon-il | Yoo Kun Jick | PCC 2005 (6th) |
| 2006–07 | Lee Jae-ho | Beak Jong-chul | Yang Se-young | Park Kwon-il | Kwon Young-il | Yoo Kun Jick | PCC 2006 (silver) |
| 2006–07 | Lee Jae-ho | Beak Jong-chul | Yang Se-young | Kwon Young-il | Park Kwon-il | Kang Yang-Won (AWG), Yoo Kun Jick (AWG); Bradley Burton (WCC) | AWG 2007 (gold); WCC 2007 (12th) |

== Record as a coach of national teams ==
| Year | Tournament, event | National team | Place |
|---|---|---|---|
| 2012 | 2012 World Wheelchair Curling Championship | South Korea (wheelchair) | 2nd place, silver medalist(s) |
