= Sun Yue (curler) =

Chinese female curler

- Curler ♀
- Born: July 30, 1986 (age 40)

Team
- Curling club: Harbin CC, Harbin

Curling career
- Member Association: China
- World Championship: 3 (2006, 2007, 2012)
- World Mixed Doubles Championship: 2 (2009, 2010)
- Pacific-Asia Championship: 4 (2003, 2006, 2010, 2011)
- Other appearances: World Junior Championships: 3 (2005, 2006, 2007), Winter Universiade: 2 (2007, 2011), Pacific-Asian Junior Championships: 4 (2005, 2006, 2007, 2008), Asian Winter Games: 1 (2007)
Medal record
Curling
World Mixed Doubles Championship
Bronze medal – third place	2010 Chelyabinsk
Pacific-Asia Championships
Gold medal – first place	2006 Tokyo
Gold medal – first place	2011 Nanjing
Silver medal – second place	2010 Uiseong
Asian Winter Games
Bronze medal – third place	2007 Changchun
Pacific-Asian Junior Championships
Gold medal – first place	2005 Tokoro
Gold medal – first place	2006 Beijing
Gold medal – first place	2007 Naseby
Silver medal – second place	2008 Jeonju City

Sun Yue (born July 30, 1986) is a Chinese female curler. She is a 2010 World mixed doubles bronze medallist and a two-time Pacific-Asia champion (2006, 2011).

== Teams ==
=== Women's ===
Season	Skip	Third	Second	Lead	Alternate	Coach	Events
2003–04	Song Kelu	Yu Xinna	Sun Yue	Li Xue	Lie Jinli	Li Hongchen	PACC 2003 (5th)
2004–05	Wang Bingyu	Yue Qingshuang	Sun Yue	Yu Xinna		Tan Weidong	PAJCC 2005 (gold); WJCC 2005 (9th)
2005–06	Wang Bingyu	Yue Qingshuang	Sun Yue	Yu Xinna		Tan Weidong	PAJCC 2006 (gold)
2005–06	Sun Yue	Yu Xinna	Chen Yinjie	Li Xue		Li Hongchen	WJCC 2006 (9th)
2005–06	Wang Bingyu	Yue Qingshuang	Liu Yin	Zhou Yan	Sun Yue	Tan Weidong	WCC 2006 (5th)
2006–07	Sun Yue	Li Xue	Yu Xinna	Chen Yinjie		Li Hongchen	PAJCC 2007 (gold); WJCC 2007 (8th)
2006–07	Sun Yue	Yu Xinna	Li Xue	Chen Yinjie	Lu Chunyu	Li Hongchen	WUG 2007 (6th)
2006–07	Liu Yin (fourth)	Wang Bingyu (skip)	Yue Qingshuang	Zhou Yan	Sun Yue	Tan Weidong, Perry Randy (AWG)	PACC 2006 (gold); AWG 2007 (bronze); WCC 2007 (7th)
2007–08	Sun Yue	Li Xue	Liu Jinli	Liu Sijia	Huang Sining	Tan Weidong	PAJCC 2008 (silver)
2010–11	Wang Bingyu	Liu Yin	Yue Qingshuang	Liu Sijia	Sun Yue	Tan Weidong	PACC 2010 (silver)
2010–11	Sun Yue	Liu Sijia	Chen Yinjie	She Qiutong	Jiang Yilun	Li Hongchen	WUG 2011 (5th)
2011–12	Wang Bingyu	Yue Qingshuang	Sun Yue	Zhou Yan	Liu Jinli	Zhang Wei	PACC 2011 (gold)
2011–12	Wang Bingyu	Sun Yue	Yue Qingshuang	Zhou Yan			CCC 2012 (gold)
2011–12	Wang Bingyu	Yue Qingshuang	Liu Jinli	Zhou Yan	Sun Yue	Zhang Wei, Christine Hamblin	WCC 2012 (11th)
2011–12	Sun Yue	Liu Jinli	Chen Yinjie	Li Xue	Zheng Chunmei		

=== Mixed doubles ===
Season	Male	Female	Coach	Events
2008–09	Zhang Zhipeng	Sun Yue	Daniel Rafael	WMDCC 2009 (4th)
2009–10	Zhang Zhipeng	Sun Yue		WMDCC 2010 (bronze)
