= Kwon Young-il =

South Korean male curler and coach

- Curler

Team
- Curling club: Gangwon Docheong, Chuncheon

Curling career
- Member Association: South Korea
- World Championship: 1 (2007)
- Pacific-Asia Championship: 4 (2000, 2004, 2005, 2006)
Medal record
Men's curling
Representing South Korea
Pacific-Asia Championships
Silver medal – second place	2006 Tokyo
Asian Winter Games
Gold medal – first place	2007 Changchun
Representing Gyeonggi
Korean Men's Championship
Silver medal – second place	2015 Icheon

Kwon Young-il is a South Korean male curler and curling coach.

At the international level, he is a 2006 Pacific-Asia silver medallist and 2007 Asian Winter Games champion curler.

== Teams ==
Season	Skip	Third	Second	Lead	Alternate	Coach	Events
2000–01	Beak Jong-chul	Kwon Young-il	Lim Sung-min	Park Kwon-il			PCC 2000 (4th)
2004–05	Beak Jong-chul	Lee Jae-ho	Yang Se-young	Park Kwon-il	Kwon Young-il	Jim Ursel, Chung Young Sup	PCC 2004 (5th)
2005–06	Beak Jong-chul	Lee Jae-ho	Yang Se-young	Kwon Young-il	Park Kwon-il	Yoo Kun Jick	PCC 2005 (6th)
2006–07	Lee Jae-ho	Beak Jong-chul	Yang Se-young	Park Kwon-il	Kwon Young-il	Yoo Kun Jick	PCC 2006 (silver)
2006–07	Lee Jae-ho	Beak Jong-chul	Yang Se-young	Kwon Young-il	Park Kwon-il	Kang Yang-Won (AWG), Yoo Kun Jick (AWG); Bradley Burton (WCC)	AWG 2007 (gold); WCC 2007 (12th)

== Record as a coach of national teams ==
Year	Tournament, event	National team	Place
2008	2008 World Wheelchair Curling Championship	South Korea (wheelchair)	2nd place, silver medalist(s)
2025	2025 World Junior Curling Championships	South Korea (Women)	1st place, gold medalist(s)
2026	2026 World Junior Curling Championships	South Korea (Women)	1st place, gold medalist(s)
