= Yang Se-young =

South Korean male curler and coach

- Curler ♂
- Born: May 23, 1977 (age 49)

Team
- Curling club: Gangwon Docheong, Chuncheon

Curling career
- Member Association: South Korea
- World Championship: 1 (2007)
- Pacific-Asia Championship: 3 (2004, 2005, 2006)
- Other appearances: Asian Winter Games: 1 (2007)
Medal record
Curling
Pacific-Asia Championships
Silver medal – second place	2006 Tokyo
Asian Winter Games
Gold medal – first place	2007 Changchun

Yang Se-young (born May 23, 1977) is a South Korean male curler and curling coach.

At the international level, he is a 2006 Pacific-Asia silver medallist and 2007 Asian Winter Games champion curler.

== Teams ==
Season	Skip	Third	Second	Lead	Alternate	Coach	Events
2004–05	Beak Jong-chul	Lee Jae-ho	Yang Se-young	Park Kwon-il	Kwon Young-il	Jim Ursel, Chung Young Sup	PCC 2004 (5th)
2005–06	Beak Jong-chul	Lee Jae-ho	Yang Se-young	Kwon Young-il	Park Kwon-il	Yoo Kun Jick	PCC 2005 (6th)
2006–07	Lee Jae-ho	Beak Jong-chul	Yang Se-young	Park Kwon-il	Kwon Young-il	Yoo Kun Jick	PCC 2006 (silver)
2006–07	Lee Jae-ho	Beak Jong-chul	Yang Se-young	Kwon Young-il	Park Kwon-il	Kang Yang-Won (AWG), Yoo Kun Jick (AWG); Bradley Burton (WCC)	AWG 2007 (gold); WCC 2007 (12th)

== Record as a coach of national teams ==
Year	Tournament, event	National team	Place
2004	2004 World Wheelchair Curling Championship	South Korea (wheelchair)	11
2010	2010 Winter Paralympics	South Korea (wheelchair)	2nd place, silver medalist(s)
2013	2013 Pacific-Asia Curling Championships	South Korea (men)	3rd place, bronze medalist(s)
2013	2013 Winter Olympics Qualification event	South Korea (men)	4
2014	2014 Pacific-Asia Curling Championships	South Korea (men)	3rd place, bronze medalist(s)
2015	2015 Pacific-Asia Curling Championships	South Korea (men)	1st place, gold medalist(s)
2016	2016 World Men's Curling Championship	South Korea (men)	11
2016	2016 Pacific-Asia Curling Championships	South Korea (men)	3rd place, bronze medalist(s)
2017	2017 Asian Winter Games	South Korea (men)	3rd place, bronze medalist(s)
