= Beak Jong-chul =

South Korean male curler and coach

- Curler ♂
- Other names: Baek Jong-chul
- Born: October 9, 1975 (age 51)

Team
- Curling club: Gangwon Docheong, Chuncheon

Curling career
- Member Association: South Korea
- World Championship: 1 (2007)
- World Mixed Doubles Championship: 3 (2012, 2014, 2015)
- Pacific-Asia Championship: 4 (2000, 2004, 2005, 2006)
- Other appearances: Asian Winter Games: 1 (2007)
Medal record
Curling
Pacific-Asia Championships
| Silver medal – second place | 2006 Tokyo |
Asian Winter Games
| Gold medal – first place | 2007 Changchun |

Beak Jong-chul (born October 9, 1975) is a South Korean male curler and curling coach.

At the international level, he is a 2006 Pacific-Asia silver medallist and 2007 Asian Winter Games champion curler.

== Teams ==
=== Men's ===
| Season | Skip | Third | Second | Lead | Alternate | Coach | Events |
|---|---|---|---|---|---|---|---|
| 2000–01 | Beak Jong-chul | Kwon Young-il | Lim Sung-min | Park Kwon-il | | | PCC 2000 (4th) |
| 2004–05 | Beak Jong-chul | Lee Jae-ho | Yang Se-young | Park Kwon-il | Kwon Young-il | Jim Ursel, Chung Young Sup | PCC 2004 (5th) |
| 2005–06 | Beak Jong-chul | Lee Jae-ho | Yang Se-young | Kwon Young-il | Park Kwon-il | Yoo Kun Jick | PCC 2005 (6th) |
| 2006–07 | Lee Jae-ho | Beak Jong-chul | Yang Se-young | Park Kwon-il | Kwon Young-il | Yoo Kun Jick | PCC 2006 (silver) |
| 2006–07 | Lee Jae-ho | Beak Jong-chul | Yang Se-young | Kwon Young-il | Park Kwon-il | Kang Yang-Won (AWG), Yoo Kun Jick (AWG); Bradley Burton (WCC) | AWG 2007 (gold); WCC 2007 (12th) |

=== Mixed doubles ===
| Season | Female | Male | Coach | Events |
|---|---|---|---|---|
| 2011–12 | Park Kyung-mi | Beak Jong-chul | | WMDCC 2012 (19th) |
| 2013–14 | Lee Hye-in | Beak Jong-chul | Mun Sung-kwan | WMDCC 2014 (15th) |
| 2014–15 | Lee Hye-in | Beak Jong-chul | Kim Hong Kuen | WMDCC 2015 (11th) |

== Record as a coach of national teams ==
| Year | Tournament, event | National team | Place |
|---|---|---|---|
| 2015 | 2015 World Wheelchair B Curling Championship | South Korea (wheelchair) | 2nd place, silver medalist(s) |
| 2016 | 2016 World Wheelchair Curling Championship | South Korea (wheelchair) | 3rd place, bronze medalist(s) |
| 2017 | 2017 World Wheelchair Curling Championship | South Korea (wheelchair) | 6 |
| 2018 | 2018 Winter Paralympics | South Korea (wheelchair) | 4 |
| 2019 | 2019 World Wheelchair Curling Championship | South Korea (wheelchair) | 3rd place, bronze medalist(s) |
