= Curling at the 2007 Asian Winter Games – Women's team =

Women's team at the 2007 Asian Winter Games
- Venue: Changchun Municipal Skating Rink
- Dates: 29 January – 1 February 2007
- Competitors: 20 from 4 nations

Medalists
gold medal	South Korea; Jeong Jin-sook, Kim Ji-suk, Park Mi-hee, Lee Hye-in, Ju Yun-hoa
silver medal	Japan; Yukako Tsuchiya, Junko Sonobe, Tomoko Sonobe, Mitsuki Sato, Miyuki Sato
bronze medal	China; Liu Yin, Wang Bingyu, Yue Qingshuang, Zhou Yan, Sun Yue

The women's curling at the 2007 Asian Winter Games was held from January 29 to February 1, 2007 at Changchun Municipal Skating Rink, China.

Four teams participated in this competition. South Korea won the gold medal after beating the top seed Japan in the final and China took the bronze.

== Squads ==
China	Japan	Kazakhstan	South Korea
Liu Yin; Wang Bingyu; Yue Qingshuang; Zhou Yan; Sun Yue	Yukako Tsuchiya; Junko Sonobe; Tomoko Sonobe; Mitsuki Sato; Miyuki Sato	Yekaterina Gorkusha; Olga Ten; Olga Zaitseva; Nargiz Issayeva; Marina Lissovaya	Jeong Jin-sook; Kim Ji-suk; Park Mi-hee; Lee Hye-in; Ju Yun-hoa

== Results ==
All times are China Standard Time (UTC+08:00)

=== Preliminary ===
Pos	Team	Skip	Pld	W	L	W–L	PF	PA	Qualification
1	Japan	Yukako Tsuchiya	6	5	1	—	46	26	Gold medal match
2	South Korea	Jeong Jin-sook	6	4	2	—	45	26	Semifinal
3	China	Liu Yin	6	3	3	—	42	29	Semifinal
4	Kazakhstan	Yekaterina Gorkusha	6	0	6	—	10	62	

Source: Official website

29 January, 9:30

Sheet C	1	2	3	4	5	6	7	8	9	10	Final
China 🔨	3	1	2	1	1	1	0	X	X	X	9
Kazakhstan	0	0	0	0	0	0	1	X	X	X	1

Sheet D	1	2	3	4	5	6	7	8	9	10	Final
South Korea 🔨	1	1	0	0	0	0	1	0	1	1	5
Japan	0	0	1	1	0	2	0	3	0	0	7

29 January, 15:30

Sheet A	1	2	3	4	5	6	7	8	9	10	Final
Japan 🔨	2	0	0	3	0	2	1	X	X	X	8
China	0	0	1	0	1	0	0	X	X	X	2

Sheet B	1	2	3	4	5	6	7	8	9	10	Final
Kazakhstan 🔨	0	0	1	0	0	0	1	0	X	X	2
South Korea	2	1	0	1	1	1	0	3	X	X	9

30 January, 9:30

Sheet C	1	2	3	4	5	6	7	8	9	10	Final
Kazakhstan 🔨	0	0	2	0	0	0	X	X	X	X	2
Japan	2	2	0	4	1	1	X	X	X	X	10

Sheet D	1	2	3	4	5	6	7	8	9	10	Final
China 🔨	0	0	0	0	0	0	3	1	0	X	4
South Korea	2	1	0	2	1	2	0	0	1	X	9

30 January, 15:30

Sheet A	1	2	3	4	5	6	7	8	9	10	Final
China 🔨	1	0	0	2	1	1	0	2	1	X	8
Japan	0	0	2	0	0	0	1	0	0	X	3

Sheet B	1	2	3	4	5	6	7	8	9	10	Final
South Korea 🔨	1	1	1	1	2	0	3	X	X	X	9
Kazakhstan	0	0	0	0	0	1	0	X	X	X	1

31 January, 9:30

Sheet C	1	2	3	4	5	6	7	8	9	10	Final
South Korea 🔨	0	1	0	3	0	2	0	0	1	1	8
China	0	0	1	0	1	0	2	2	0	0	6

Sheet D	1	2	3	4	5	6	7	8	9	10	Final
Japan 🔨	5	0	5	1	0	1	X	X	X	X	12
Kazakhstan	0	3	0	0	1	0	X	X	X	X	4

31 January, 15:30

Sheet A	1	2	3	4	5	6	7	8	9	10	Final
Japan 🔨	0	3	0	0	0	1	0	1	0	1	6
South Korea	2	0	0	0	1	0	1	0	1	0	5

Sheet B	1	2	3	4	5	6	7	8	9	10	Final
Kazakhstan 🔨	0	0	0	0	0	0	X	X	X	X	0
China	2	1	3	1	2	4	X	X	X	X	13

=== Knockout round ===
Semifinal			Gold medal match
			1	Japan	6
2	South Korea	9	2	South Korea	7
3	China	5

==== Semifinal ====
1 February, 9:00

Sheet C	1	2	3	4	5	6	7	8	9	10	Final
China	1	0	2	0	0	1	0	1	0	0	5
South Korea 🔨	0	1	0	2	2	0	1	0	1	2	9

==== Gold medal match ====
1 February, 19:30

Sheet D	1	2	3	4	5	6	7	8	9	10	Final
South Korea	0	0	0	1	0	0	1	0	3	2	7
Japan 🔨	0	0	2	0	1	1	0	2	0	0	6

== Final standing ==
Rank	Team	Pld	W	L
1st place, gold medalist(s)	South Korea	8	6	2
2nd place, silver medalist(s)	Japan	7	5	2
3rd place, bronze medalist(s)	China	4	3	4
4	Kazakhstan	6	0	6
