= Hans Frauenlob =

New Zealand curler

- Curler
- Born: 22 November 1960 (age 65); Barrie, Ontario, Canada

Curling career
- Member Association: New Zealand
- World Championship: 4 (1999, 2001, 2004, 2005)
- World Mixed Doubles Championship: 1 (2013)
- Pacific-Asia Championship: 10 (1997, 1998, 1999, 2000, 2001, 2002, 2003, 2004, 2005, 2006)
- Olympic: 1 (2006)
Medal record
Men's curling
Representing New Zealand
Pacific Championships
Gold medal – first place	1998 Qualicum Beach
Gold medal – first place	2000 Esquimalt
Gold medal – first place	2003 Aomori
Gold medal – first place	2004 Chuncheon
Silver medal – second place	2001 Jeonju
Bronze medal – third place	1997 Karuizawa
Bronze medal – third place	1999 Tokoro
Bronze medal – third place	2005 Taipei
World Senior Championships
Silver medal – second place	2013 Fredericton
Bronze medal – third place	2015 Sochi

Hans Frauenlob (born 22 November 1960) is a New Zealand retired curler originally from Canada.

== Career ==
Frauenlob moved to New Zealand in around 1995, settling in Auckland. Before moving to New Zealand, he worked as a computer expert for the Toronto Blue Jays for six years, and was awarded with the team's World Series winning rings when the team won in 1992 and 1993. He was able to acquire New Zealand citizenship because his mother was born there. After moving to New Zealand, he worked for New Zealand Trade and Enterprise.

In 1997 Frauenlob was selected to represent New Zealand in their Men's curling team. Frauenlob played most of his career as third for skip Sean Becker. With Becker, Frauenlob won three Pacific Curling Championships in 1998, 2003, and 2004. He also won the Pacific Curling Championships in 2000 as second under skip Dan Mustapic. Frauenlob played with Becker in the 2004 and 2005 World Men's Curling Championships, finishing in seventh and eighth place, respectively. Frauenlob also was part of the first curling team to represent New Zealand at the Winter Olympics in 2006 in Turin. Skipped by Becker, the team finished in last place, with a 0–9 win–loss record.

After Frauenlob reached the age of eligibility to participate in senior curling events, he skipped New Zealand at the 2012 World Senior Curling Championships, but lost in the quarterfinals to Sweden's Connie Östlund. He also skipped New Zealand at the next year's championships, and went all the way to the final before losing to Canada's Rob Armitage. At the same time, he played in the 2013 World Mixed Doubles Curling Championship, and finished in fifth after losing in the quarterfinals. In 2015, he skipped New Zealand to a bronze medal at the 2015 World Senior Curling Championships.

Frauenlob announced his retirement from competitive curling in 2023.

== Television commentator ==
Frauenlob has been a live sports commentator for a number of events. His first commentary provided voiceover comments for Television New Zealand for the 2002 Winter Olympics. He has done live commentary for World Curling Television from multiple Pacific-Asia and World Curling championships. He did host broadcaster curling commentary for the 2018 Winter Olympics, worldfeed curling commentary for the 2022 Winter Olympics, as well as for multiple New Zealand Winter Games.

He has done television baseball commentary for the Auckland Tuatara of the Australian Baseball League.
