= Park Kyung-mi =

South Korean curler

- Curler
- Born: South Korea

Team
- Curling club: Kyung Gido Council, Gyeonggi-do

Curling career
- Member Association: South Korea
- World Mixed Doubles Championship: 3 (2009, 2011, 2012)
- Pacific-Asia Championship: 5 (2002, 2003, 2004, 2007, 2008)
Medal record
Women's curling
Representing South Korea
Pacific Championships
Silver medal – second place	2002 Queenstown
Silver medal – second place	2003 Aomori
Silver medal – second place	2008 Naseby
Bronze medal – third place	2004 Chuncheon
Bronze medal – third place	2007 Beijing
Asian Winter Games
Silver medal – second place	2003 Aomori

Park Kyung-mi is a South Korean curler. She won silver medals at the 2002, 2003 and 2008 Pacific-Asia Curling Championships.

== Career ==
Park joined the Kim Mi-yeon team in 2002 as the team's alternate. They played in the Pacific Championships from 2002–2004 with silver medals in 2002 and 2003 and a bronze in 2004. The team moved their lineup around for the 2007 Pacific Curling Championships and Park Kyung-mi was moved to lead of the team which was now skipped by Park Ji-hyun. They finished with a 4–4 round robin record and lost the World Championship berth game to Japan's Moe Meguro. The team won a silver medal at the 2008 Pacific Curling Championships although South Korea already had their team qualified for the 2009 Mount Titlis World Women's Curling Championship as the host nation. The team altered their lineup for the World Championship, which didn't include Park.

Other than team curling, Park has competed in three World Mixed Doubles Curling Championship in 2009, 2011 and 2012. Her best finish was at the 2012 World Mixed Doubles Curling Championship with partner Beak Jong-chul where the pair finished in nineteenth with a 3–5 record.
