= Mike Woloschuk =

Australian male curler

- Curler ♂
- Born: May 9, 1970 (age 56); Melville, Saskatchewan

Team
- Curling club: Sydney Harbour CC, Sydney

Curling career
- Member Association: Australia
- World Championship: 2 (2006, 2007)
- Pacific-Asia Championship: 2 (2005, 2006)
Medal record
Curling
Pacific-Asia Championships
Gold medal – first place	2005 Taipei
Gold medal – first place	2006 Tokyo

Mike Woloschuk (born May 9, 1970, in Melville, Saskatchewan, Canada) is a Canadian-Australian curler.

At the international level, he represented Australia at two World Curling Championships and is a two-time Pacific-Asia men's champion curler (2005, 2006).

== Personal life ==
As of the 2007 World Championships, Woloschuk was living in Brisbane. He retired from international curling after the 2007 World Men's Curling Championships in Edmonton. Since then, he spent time living in Canada and USA. He currently resides in Lexington, Kentucky working as a mining industry executive.

== Teams and events ==
Season	Skip	Third	Second	Lead	Alternate	Coach	Events
2005–06	Ian Palangio (fourth)	Hugh Millikin (skip)	Ricky Tasker	Mike Woloschuk			PCC 2005 (gold)
2005–06	Hugh Millikin	Ricky Tasker	Mike Woloschuk	Stephen Johns	Ian Palangio	Earle Morris	WCC 2006 (9th)
2006–07	Ian Palangio (fourth)	Hugh Millikin (skip)	Sean Hall	Mike Woloschuk	David Imlah	Earle Morris (WCC)	PCC 2006 (gold); WCC 2007 (10th)
