= Sean Hall (curler) =

Australian curler

- Curler

Team
- Curling club: Sydney Harbour CC, Sydney, Boondall CC, Queensland
- Skip: Matt Panoussi
- Fourth: Sean Hall
- Second: Derek Smith
- Lead: Sam Williams

Curling career
- Member Association: Australia
- World Championship: 2 (2007, 2008)
- Pacific-Asia Championship: 5 (2006, 2007, 2008, 2012, 2019)
Medal record
Men's curling
Representing Australia
Pacific-Asia Championships
Gold medal – first place	2006 Tokyo
Silver medal – second place	2007 Beijing
Bronze medal – third place	2012 Naseby

Sean Hall is an Australian curler.

== Teams and events ==
Season	Skip	Third	Second	Lead	Alternate	Coach	Events
2006–07	Ian Palangio (Fourth)	Hugh Millikin (Skip)	Sean Hall	Mike Woloschuk	David Imlah	Earle Morris (WCC)	AMCC 2006 (gold); PCC 2006 (gold); WCC 2007 (10th)
2007–08	Ian Palangio (Fourth)	Hugh Millikin (Skip)	Sean Hall	Stephen Johns	Stephen Hewitt	Earle Morris (WCC), Rob Gagnon (PCC, WCC)	AMCC 2007 (gold); PCC 2007 (silver); WCC 2008 (10th)
2008–09	Ian Palangio (Fourth)	Hugh Millikin (Skip)	Sean Hall	Stephen Johns	Stephen Hewitt	Earle Morris	AMCC 2008 (gold); PCC 2008 (5th)
2012–13	Ian Palangio (Fourth)	Hugh Millikin (Skip)	Sean Hall	Stephen Johns	Angus Young	Angus Young	AMCC 2012 (gold); PACC 2012 (bronze)
2019–20	Dean Hewitt (Fourth)	Sean Hall (Skip)	Tanner Davis	Jay Merchant	Matthew Millikin	Archie Merchant	AMCC 2019 (gold); PACC 2019 (6th)
2022–23	Hugh Millikin	Matt Panoussi	Sean Hall	Derek Smith			AMCC 2022 (silver)
2024–25	Sean Hall (Fourth)	Matt Panoussi (Skip)	Derek Smith	Sam Williams			AMCC 2024 (silver)
