= Ricky Tasker =

Australian and Scottish male curler

- Curler ♂
- Born: 15 October 1976 (age 50); Forfar, Scotland

Team
- Curling club: Sydney Harbour CC, Sydney

Curling career
- Member Association: Scotland; Australia
- World Championship: 1 (2006)
- Pacific-Asia Championship: 2 (2003, 2005)
- Other appearances: World Junior Championships: 1 (1997)
Medal record
Curling
Pacific-Asia Championships
| Gold medal – first place | 2005 Taipei |
| Silver medal – second place | 2003 Aomori |

Ricky Tasker (born 15 October 1976 in Forfar, Scotland) is a Scottish-Australian curler.

At the international level, he is a 2005 Pacific-Asia men's champion curler.

== Teams and events ==
| Season | Skip | Third | Second | Lead | Alternate | Coach | Events |
|---|---|---|---|---|---|---|---|
| 1996–97 | Ricky Tasker | Gary Wood | Jamie Kirk | Sandy Reid | Ewan MacDonald (WJCC) | | SJCC 1997 (gold); WJCC 1997 (7th) |
| 2003–04 | Ian Palangio (fourth) | Hugh Millikin (skip) | John Theriault | Steve Johns | Ricky Tasker | | PCC 2003 (silver) |
| 2005–06 | Ian Palangio (fourth) | Hugh Millikin (skip) | Ricky Tasker | Mike Woloschuk | | | PCC 2005 (gold) |
| 2005–06 | Hugh Millikin | Ricky Tasker | Mike Woloschuk | Stephen Johns | Ian Palangio | Earle Morris | WCC 2006 (9th) |
