= Lee Jae-ho =

South Korean curler

- Curler

Team
- Curling club: Gangwon Docheong, Chuncheon

Curling career
- Member Association: South Korea
- World Championship: 1 (2007)
- Pacific-Asia Championship: 3 (2004, 2005, 2006)
Medal record
Men's curling
Representing South Korea
Pacific-Asia Championships
| Silver medal – second place | 2006 Tokyo |
Asian Winter Games
| Gold medal – first place | 2007 Changchun |
Representing Cheongju
Korean Men's Championship
| Bronze medal – third place | 2016 Uiseong |

Lee Jae-ho is a South Korean male curler.

At the international level, he is a 2006 Pacific-Asia silver medallist and 2007 Asian Winter Games champion curler.

== Teams ==
| Season | Skip | Third | Second | Lead | Alternate | Coach | Events |
|---|---|---|---|---|---|---|---|
| 2004–05 | Beak Jong-chul | Lee Jae-ho | Yang Se-young | Park Kwon-il | Kwon Young-il | Jim Ursel, Chung Young Sup | PCC 2004 (5th) |
| 2005–06 | Beak Jong-chul | Lee Jae-ho | Yang Se-young | Kwon Young-il | Park Kwon-il | Yoo Kun Jick | PCC 2005 (6th) |
| 2006–07 | Lee Jae-ho | Beak Jong-chul | Yang Se-young | Park Kwon-il | Kwon Young-il | Yoo Kun Jick | PCC 2006 (silver) |
| 2006–07 | Lee Jae-ho | Beak Jong-chul | Yang Se-young | Kwon Young-il | Park Kwon-il | Kang Yang-Won (AWG), Yoo Kun Jick (AWG); Bradley Burton (WCC) | AWG 2007 (gold); WCC 2007 (12th) |
| 2015–16 | Seong Yu-jin | Hong Jun-yeong | Jeon Byeong-uk | Lee Ge-on | Lee Jae-ho | Min Byeung Eun | WJCC 2016 (10th) |
