= Ian Palangio =

Australian curler (1972–2020)

- Curler
- Born: 21 November 1972; Orangeville, Ontario, Canada
- Died: 2020

Team
- Curling club: Ottawa CC; Sydney Harbour CC (fictional)

Curling career
- Member Association: Ontario (c. 1986–2000); Australia (2001–2020)
- World Championship: 4 (2005, 2006, 2007, 2008)
- World Mixed Doubles Championship: 2 (2014, 2016)
- Pacific-Asia Championship: 16 (2001, 2002, 2003, 2004, 2005, 2006, 2007, 2008, 2009, 2010, 2012, 2013, 2014, 2015, 2016, 2017)
- Other appearances: World Mixed Curling Championship: 1 (2015)
Medal record
Men's curling
Representing Australia
Pacific Championships
Gold medal – first place	2005 Taipei
Gold medal – first place	2006 Tokyo
Silver medal – second place	2002 Queenstown
Silver medal – second place	2003 Aomori
Silver medal – second place	2004 Chuncheon
Silver medal – second place	2007 Beijing
Bronze medal – third place	2001 Jeonju
Bronze medal – third place	2010 Uiseong
Bronze medal – third place	2012 Naseby

Ian "Ice Nut" Palangio (21 November 1972 – 2020) was a Canadian–Australian curler. He represented Australia at four World Curling Championships and was a two-time Pacific Curling Champion.

Palangio began curling in 1986. While living in Canada, he won provincial university championship with the University of Waterloo in 1996 and the OVCA Mixed Bonspiel in 1998.

He worked for the Australian Curling Federation as board member and Federation's website main editor.

== Personal life ==
Palangio was born in Orangeville, Ontario. Outside of curling he was sales representative for Microsoft. He lived in Brisbane, Queensland and Narrabeen, New South Wales. He was married to Lisa Bow and had two children. After his death in 2020, Curling Australia dedicated the Ian Palangio Memorial Spirit of Curling Award for the men's discipline in his honour.

== Teammates and events ==
=== Men's ===
Season	Skip	Third	Second	Lead	Alternate	Coach	Events
1994	Eric Johannsen	Ian Palangio	Jack Casserly	Tom Deacon			
1995–96	James Bromiley	Jamie Lidstone	Scott Reid	Ian Palangio			
1999–00	Frank O'Driscoll	Ian Palangio	Craig Cordiner	Brian Norman			
2001–02	Hugh Millikin	Ian Palangio	John Theriault	Steve Johns			PCC 2001 (bronze)
2002–03	Hugh Millikin	Ian Palangio	John Theriault	Steve Johns	Steve Hewitt		PCC 2002 (silver)
2003–04	Ian Palangio (fourth)	Hugh Millikin (skip)	John Theriault	Steve Johns	Ricky Tasker		PCC 2003 (silver)
2004–05	Hugh Millikin	Ian Palangio	John Theriault	Steve Johns			PCC 2004 (silver)
2004–05	Ian Palangio (fourth)	Hugh Millikin (skip)	John Theriault	Steve Johns	Steve Hewitt		WMCC 2005 (10th)
2005–06	Ian Palangio (fourth)	Hugh Millikin (skip)	Ricky Tasker	Mike Woloschuk			PCC 2005 (gold)
2005–06	Hugh Millikin	Ricky Tasker	Mike Woloschuk	Steve Johns	Ian Palangio	Earle Morris	WMCC 2006 (9th)
2006–07	Ian Palangio (fourth)	Hugh Millikin (skip)	Sean Hall	Mike Woloschuk	David Imlah	Earle Morris	PCC 2006 (gold); WMCC 2007 (10th)
2007–08	Ian Palangio (fourth)	Hugh Millikin (skip)	Sean Hall	Steve Johns	Steve Hewitt	Earle Morris	PCC 2007 (silver); WMCC 2008 (6th)
2008–09	Ian Palangio (fourth)	Hugh Millikin (skip)	Sean Hall	Steve Johns	Steve Hewitt	Earle Morris	PCC 2008 (5th)
2009–10	Ian Palangio (fourth)	Hugh Millikin (skip)	John Theriault	Ted Basset			PCC 2009 (4th)
2010–11	Ian Palangio (fourth)	Hugh Millikin (skip)	Steve Johns	Don Glendinning			AMCC 2010 (gold)
2010–11	Ian Palangio (fourth)	Hugh Millikin (skip)	John Theriault	Matt Panoussi	Vaughan Rosier	Jay Merchant	PCC 2010 (bronze)
2012–13	Ian Palangio (fourth)	Hugh Millikin (skip)	Sean Hall	Steve Johns	Angus Young	Angus Young	PACC 2012 (bronze)
2013–14	Ian Palangio (fourth)	Hugh Millikin (skip)	Duncan Clark	Angus Young			PACC 2013 (6th)
2014–15	Ian Palangio	Jay Merchant	Dean Hewitt	Steve Johns		Archie Merchant	PACC 2014 (4th)
2015–16	Ian Palangio	Jay Merchant	Dean Hewitt	Derek Smith		Archie Merchant	PACC 2015 (5th)
2016–17	Ian Palangio	Jay Merchant	Dean Hewitt	Derek Smith		Archie Merchant	PACC 2016 (7th)
2017–18	Dean Hewitt (fourth)	Ian Palangio	Christopher Ordog	Hugh Millikin (skip)	Jay Merchant	Archie Merchant	PACC 2017 (4th)
2018–19	Dean Hewitt	Jay Merchant	Rupert Jones	Ian Palangio	Steve Johns		AMCC 2018 (gold)

=== Mixed ===
Season	Skip	Third	Second	Lead	Events
2015–16	Ian Palangio	Kim Forge	Steve Johns	Anne Powell	AMxCC 2015 (gold); WMxCC 2015 (29th)

=== Mixed doubles ===
Season	Male	Female	Coach	Events
2013–14	Ian Palangio	Laurie Weeden	Carlee Millikin	WMDCC 2014 (12th)
2014–15	Ian Palangio	Laurie Weeden		AMDCC 2014 (silver)
2015–16	Ian Palangio	Laurie Weeden		AMDCC 2015 (gold); WMDCC 2016 (31st)
