= John Theriault =

Australian curler

- Curler ♂
- Born: 22 January 1960 (age 66)

Team
- Curling club: Sydney Harbour CC, Sydney

Curling career
- Member Association: Ontario (1978-1995); Australia (1997-present)
- World Championship: 2 (1998, 2005)
- Pacific-Asia Championship: 10 (1997, 1998, 1999, 2000, 2001, 2002, 2002, 2003, 2004, 2009, 2010)
- Other appearances: World Senior Championships: 3 (2011, 2012, 2017)
Medal record
Curling
Pacific-Asia Championships
Gold medal – first place	1997 Karuizawa
Silver medal – second place	1999 Tokoro
Silver medal – second place	2000 Esquimalt
Silver medal – second place	2002 Queenstown
Silver medal – second place	2003 Aomori
Silver medal – second place	2004 Chuncheon
Bronze medal – third place	1998 Qualicum Beach
Bronze medal – third place	2001 Jeonju
Bronze medal – third place	2010 Uiseong
World Senior Championships
Bronze medal – third place	2011 St. Paul

John Theriault (born 22 January 1960) is an Australian curler. He is originally from Zweibrücken, Germany. Theriault also curled in the Ottawa area before moving to Australia.

At the international level, he is a 1997 Pacific-Asia men's champion curler.

As of 2012, he was a President of the Australian Curling Federation.

== Personal life ==
As of the 2005 World Championships, Theriault was living in Sydney, was married and had four children and worked for Indigo Pacific.

== Teams and events ==
Season	Skip	Third	Second	Lead	Alternate	Coach	Events
1978–79	Chris MacKinnon	John Theriault	Al Jensen	Jim Jensen			
1992–93	Brad Shinn	John Theriault	Dave Stanley	Geoff Colley			
1997–98	Hugh Millikin	John Theriault	Stephen Johns	Trevor Schumm			PCC 1997 (gold)
1997–98	Hugh Millikin	Trevor Schumm	John Theriault	Stephen Johns	Stephen Hewitt		WCC 1998 (9th)
1998–99	Hugh Millikin	Stephen Johns	John Theriault	Gerald Chick			PCC 1998 (bronze)
1999–00	Hugh Millikin	John Theriault	Gerald Chick	Stephen Johns			PCC 1999 (silver)
2000–01	Hugh Millikin	Gerald Chick	John Theriault	Stephen Johns			PCC 2000 (silver)
2001–02	Hugh Millikin	Ian Palangio	John Theriault	Stephen Johns			PCC 2001 (bronze)
2002–03	Hugh Millikin	Ian Palangio	John Theriault	Stephen Johns	Stephen Hewitt		PCC 2002 (silver)
2003–04	Ian Palangio (fourth)	Hugh Millikin (skip)	John Theriault	Steve Johns	Ricky Tasker		PCC 2003 (silver)
2004–05	Hugh Millikin	Ian Palangio	John Theriault	Stephen Johns			PCC 2004 (silver)
2004–05	Ian Palangio (fourth)	Hugh Millikin (skip)	John Theriault	Stephen Johns	Stephen Hewitt		WCC 2005 (10th)
2009–10	Ian Palangio (fourth)	Hugh Millikin (skip)	John Theriault	Ted Bassett			PCC 2009 (4th)
2010–11	Ian Palangio (fourth)	Hugh Millikin (skip)	John Theriault	Matt Panoussi	Vaughan Rosier	Jay Merchant	PCC 2010 (bronze)
2010–11	Hugh Millikin	John Theriault	Jim Allan	Dave Thomas	Tom Kidd	Jay Merchant	WSCC 2011 (bronze)
2011–12	Hugh Millikin	John Theriault	Stephen Hewitt	Rob Gagnon	Wyatt Buck		WSCC 2012 (7th)
2016–17	Hugh Millikin	John Theriault	Jim Allan	Stephen Johns	John Anderson	Sandra Thompson	WSCC 2017 (5th)
