= David Imlah =

Australian male curler and coach

- Curler ♂
- Born: May 9, 1970 (age 56)

Team
- Curling club: Sydney Harbour CC, Sydney

Curling career
- Member Association: Australia
- World Championship: 1 (2007)
- Pacific-Asia Championship: 1 (2006)
- Other appearances: World Senior Championships: 4 (2016, 2019, 2024, 2025)
Medal record
Curling
Pacific-Asia Championships
Gold medal – first place	2006 Tokyo

David Imlah is an Australian curler and curling coach.

At the international level, he is a 2006 Pacific-Asia men's champion curler.

== Teams and events ==
Season	Skip	Third	Second	Lead	Alternate	Coach	Events
2006–07	Ian Palangio (fourth)	Hugh Millikin (skip)	Sean Hall	Mike Woloschuk	David Imlah	Earle Morris (WCC)	PCC 2006 (gold); WCC 2007 (10th)
2009–10	Tim McMahon	David Imlah	Angus Young	Phil Goschnick			AMCC 2010 (bronze)
2015–16	Gerald Chick	Tim McMahon	David Imlah	Rob Gagnon	Wyatt Buck	Wyatt Buck	WSCC 2016 (15th)
2018–19	Hugh Millikin	Geoff Davis	Tim McMahon	David Imlah	John Anderson	Judy McMahon	WSCC 2019 (5th)

== Record as a coach of national teams ==
Year	Tournament, event	National team	Place
2019	2019 World Junior-B Curling Championships (December)	Australia (junior men)	20
