= Dan Mustapic =

New Zealand male curler

- Curler ♂
- Born: 23 August 1960 (age 66); Port Arthur, Ontario, Canada

Team
- Curling club: Ranfurly CC, Ranfurly, New Zealand

Curling career
- Member Association: Ontario (1992–1998); New Zealand (2000–present)
- World Championship: 3 (2001, 2004, 2005)
- World Mixed Doubles Championship: 1 (2015)
- Pacific-Asia Championship: 6 (2000, 2002, 2004, 2005, 2006, 2009)
- Olympic: 1 (2006)
- Other appearances: World Senior Championship: 4 (2013, 2015, 2016, 2017)
Medal record
Curling
Pacific Championships
Gold medal – first place	2000 Esquimalt
Gold medal – first place	2004 Chuncheon
Bronze medal – third place	2005 Taipei
World Senior Championships
Silver medal – second place	2013 Fredericton
Bronze medal – third place	2015 Sochi

Daniel Matthew Mustapic (born 23 August 1960) is a New Zealand curler from Dunedin. He is a two-time Pacific-Asian champion (2000, 2004) and a four-time New Zealand men's champion (2003, 2005, 2006, 2012).

He participated in the 2006 Winter Olympics, where the New Zealand men's team finished in tenth place.

Prior to emigrating to New Zealand, Mustapic was active in the Ontario curling scene. While living in Hamilton and curling out of Kitchener, he won the 1994 Welton Beauchamp Classic. He is the father of comedian James Mustapic.

== Teams ==
=== Men's ===
Season	Skip	Third	Second	Lead	Alternate	Coach	Events
1992–93	Dan Mustapic	Mark Kozak	David Simpson	Hugh Widdup			
1994–95	Dan Mustapic	John Thompson	Jason Lehtovaara	Dunc MacLean			WCT
2000–01	Dan Mustapic	Sean Becker	Hans Frauenlob	Jim Allan	Lorne De Pape	Edwin Harley	PCC 2000 (gold)
2000–01	Dan Mustapic	Sean Becker	Hans Frauenlob	Lorne De Pape	Jim Allan	Edwin Harley	WCC 2001 (9th)
2002–03	Sean Becker	Hans Frauenlob	Jim Allan	Lorne De Pape	Dan Mustapic		PCC 2002 (4th)
2003–04	Sean Becker	Hans Frauenlob	Dan Mustapic	Lorne De Pape	Warren Dobson	Peter Becker	WCC 2004 (7th)
2004–05	Sean Becker	Hans Frauenlob	Dan Mustapic	Lorne De Pape	Warren Dobson	Peter Becker	PCC 2004 (gold); WCC 2005 (8th)
2005–06	Sean Becker	Hans Frauenlob	Dan Mustapic	Lorne De Pape	Warren Dobson	Peter Becker	PCC 2005 (bronze); WOG 2006 (10th)
2006–07	Dan Mustapic	Hans Frauenlob	Rupert Jones	Lorne De Pape		Edwin Harley	PCC 2006 (5th)
2007–08	Dan Mustapic	Kenny Thomson	Peter de Boer	Haymon Keeler	Lorne De Pape		NZMCC 2008 (bronze)
2008–09	Dan Mustapic	Hans Frauenlob	Kenny Thomson	Lorne De Pape			NZMCC 2009 (silver)
2009–10	Dan Mustapic	Scott Becker	Warren Kearney	Warren Dobson	Kris Miller		PCC 2009 (5th)
2009–10	Dan Mustapic	Kenny Thomson	Lorne De Pape	Doug Charko			NZMCC 2010 (silver)
2012–13	Hans Frauenlob	Lorne De Pape	Allan Langille	Pat Cooney	Dan Mustapic		WSCC 2013 (silver)
2012–13	Dan Mustapic	Lorne De Pape	Allan Langille	Pat Cooney	Eugenio Molinatti		NZMCC 2013 (silver)
2013–14	Dan Mustapic	Lorne De Pape	Iain Craig	Derek Jansen			NZMCC 2014 (silver)
2014–15	Hans Frauenlob	Dan Mustapic	Lorne De Pape	Iain Craig	Dave Watt		WSCC 2015 (bronze)
2014–15	Hans Frauenlob	Dan Mustapic	Brett Sargon	Kieran Ford			NZMCC 2015 (bronze)
2015–16	Hans Frauenlob	Dan Mustapic	Dave Watt	Iain Craig	Lorne De Pape		WSCC 2016 (5th)
2016–17	Dan Mustapic	Hans Frauenlob	Dave Watt	Lorne De Pape	Iain Craig		WSCC 2017 (5th)

=== Mixed doubles ===
Season	Male	Female	Events
2008–09	Dan Mustapic	Brydie Donald	NZMDCC 2009 (silver)
2009–10	Dan Mustapic	Brydie Donald	NZMDCC 2010 (silver)
2013–14	Dan Mustapic	Marisa Jones	NZMDCC 2014 (gold)
2015–16	Dan Mustapic	Waverley Taylor	NZMDCC 2016 (9th)
