= 2001 Pacific Curling Championships =

- Host city: Jeonju, South Korea
- Arena: Jeonju Indoor Ice Rink
- Dates: November 6–10
- Men's winner: Japan
- Curling club: Miyota CC
- Skip: Hiroaki Kashiwagi
- Third: Kazuto Yanagizawa
- Second: Jun Nakayama
- Lead: Keita Yanagizawa
- Alternate: Takanori Ichimura
- Finalist: New Zealand (Sean Becker)
- Women's winner: South Korea
- Curling club: Seoul CC
- Skip: Kim Mi-yeon
- Third: Lee Hyun-jung
- Second: Shin Mi-sung
- Lead: Park Ji-hyun
- Coach: Elaine Dagg-Jackson
- Finalist: Japan (Akiko Katoh)

The 2001 Pacific Curling Championships were held from November 6 to 10 at the Jeonju Indoor Ice Rink in Jeonju, South Korea.

Japan's Hiroaki Kashiwagi won the men's event over New Zealand's Sean Becker (it was the second Pacific title for the Japanese men's team and the first title for skip Hiroaki Kashiwagi). On the women's side, South Korea's Kim Mi-yeon defeated Japan's Akiko Katoh in the final (it was the first Pacific title for the South Korean women).

By virtue of winning, the Japanese men's team and the South Korean women's team qualified for the 2002 World Men's and Women's Curling Championships in Bismarck, North Dakota, United States.

It was the first appearance at the Pacific championships for the men's and women's teams of Chinese Taipei.

== Men ==
=== Teams ===
| Country | Skip | Third | Second | Lead | Alternate | Coach | Curling club |
|---|---|---|---|---|---|---|---|
| Australia | Hugh Millikin | Ian Palangio | John Theriault | Stephen Johns | | | New South Wales CC |
| Chinese Taipei | Po-Hen Hu | Yu-Feng Lin | Yu-Ting Lai | Chia-Hua Ku | | | Taiwan CC |
| Japan | Hiroaki Kashiwagi | Kazuto Yanagizawa | Jun Nakayama | Keita Yanagizawa | Takanori Ichimura | | Miyota CC |
| South Korea | Lee Dong-keun | Kim Soo-hyuk | Choi Min-suk | Park Jae-cheol | Hong Jun-pyo | Glen Jackson | Gyeong-buk CC |
| New Zealand | Sean Becker | Hans Frauenlob | Tom Telfer | Lorne De Pape | | | Ranfurly CC |

=== Round robin standings ===
Final Round Robin Standings

Key
| Teams to Playoffs |

| Country | Skip | W | L |
|---|---|---|---|
| New Zealand | Sean Becker | 6 | 2 |
| Japan | Hiroaki Kashiwagi | 6 | 2 |
| Australia | Hugh Millikin | 6 | 2 |
| South Korea | Lee Dong-keun | 2 | 6 |
| Chinese Taipei | Po-Hen Hu | 0 | 8 |

=== Playoffs ===
| Semifinal | | | Final |
| | | | 1 | New Zealand | 5 |
| 2 | Japan | 6 | 2 | Japan | 6 |
| 3 | Australia | 4 |

==== Semifinal ====
| Team | 1 | 2 | 3 | 4 | 5 | 6 | 7 | 8 | 9 | 10 | Final |
|---|---|---|---|---|---|---|---|---|---|---|---|
| Japan (Kashiwagi) | 0 | 1 | 0 | 0 | 1 | 0 | 1 | 0 | 0 | 3 | 6 |
| Australia (Millikin) | 0 | 0 | 0 | 1 | 0 | 2 | 0 | 1 | 0 | 0 | 4 |

==== Final ====
| Team | 1 | 2 | 3 | 4 | 5 | 6 | 7 | 8 | 9 | 10 | 11 | Final |
|---|---|---|---|---|---|---|---|---|---|---|---|---|
| New Zealand (Becker) | 1 | 0 | 0 | 0 | 0 | 0 | 0 | 3 | 0 | 1 | 0 | 5 |
| Japan (Kashiwagi) | 0 | 1 | 1 | 1 | 0 | 0 | 1 | 0 | 1 | 0 | 1 | 6 |

=== Final standings ===
| Place | Country | Skip | GP | W | L |
|---|---|---|---|---|---|
| 1st place, gold medalist(s) | Japan | Hiroaki Kashiwagi | 10 | 8 | 2 |
| 2nd place, silver medalist(s) | New Zealand | Sean Becker | 9 | 6 | 3 |
| 3rd place, bronze medalist(s) | Australia | Hugh Millikin | 9 | 6 | 3 |
| 4 | South Korea | Lee Dong-keun | 8 | 2 | 6 |
| 5 | Chinese Taipei | Po-Hen Hu | 8 | 0 | 8 |

== Women ==
=== Teams ===
| Country | Skip | Third | Second | Lead | Alternate | Coach | Curling club |
|---|---|---|---|---|---|---|---|
| Australia | Helen Wright | Lynn Hewitt | Lyn Greenwood | Ellen Weir | Sandy Gagnon | | Victoria Curling Association |
| Chinese Taipei | Li-Lin Cheng | Jamie Wan Wen Huang | Zhao Zhenzhen | Zhan Jing | | | Taiwan CC |
| Japan | Akiko Katoh | Yumie Hayashi | Ayumi Onodera | Mika Konaka | Kotomi Ishizaki | Yoshiyuki Ohmiya | Tokoro Curling Association, Hokkaido |
| South Korea | Kim Mi-yeon | Lee Hyun-jung | Shin Mi-sung | Park Ji-hyun | | Elaine Dagg-Jackson | Seoul CC |
| New Zealand | Bridget Becker | Kylie Petherick | Natalie Campbell | Catherine Inder | | Peter Becker | Pioneer CC |

=== Round robin standings ===
Final Round Robin Standings

Key
| Teams to Playoffs |

| Country | Skip | W | L |
|---|---|---|---|
| Japan | Akiko Katoh | 8 | 0 |
| South Korea | Kim Mi-yeon | 6 | 2 |
| Australia | Helen Wright | 4 | 4 |
| New Zealand | Bridget Becker | 2 | 6 |
| Chinese Taipei | Li-Lin Cheng | 0 | 8 |

=== Playoffs ===
| Semifinal | | | Final |
| | | | 1 | Japan | 5 |
| 2 | South Korea | 13 | 2 | South Korea | 7 |
| 3 | Australia | 6 |

==== Semifinal ====
| Team | 1 | 2 | 3 | 4 | 5 | 6 | 7 | 8 | 9 | 10 | Final |
|---|---|---|---|---|---|---|---|---|---|---|---|
| South Korea (Kim) | 0 | 2 | 0 | 2 | 0 | 3 | 0 | 4 | 2 | X | 13 |
| Australia (Wright) | 1 | 0 | 2 | 0 | 1 | 0 | 2 | 0 | 0 | X | 6 |

==== Final ====
| Team | 1 | 2 | 3 | 4 | 5 | 6 | 7 | 8 | 9 | 10 | Final |
|---|---|---|---|---|---|---|---|---|---|---|---|
| Japan (Katoh) | 0 | 1 | 0 | 2 | 1 | 0 | 0 | 1 | 0 | 0 | 5 |
| South Korea (Kim) | 1 | 0 | 3 | 0 | 0 | 0 | 1 | 0 | 1 | 1 | 7 |

=== Final standings ===
| Place | Country | Skip | GP | W | L |
|---|---|---|---|---|---|
| 1st place, gold medalist(s) | South Korea | Kim Mi-yeon | 10 | 8 | 2 |
| 2nd place, silver medalist(s) | Japan | Akiko Katoh | 9 | 8 | 1 |
| 3rd place, bronze medalist(s) | Australia | Helen Wright | 9 | 4 | 5 |
| 4 | New Zealand | Bridget Becker | 8 | 2 | 6 |
| 5 | Chinese Taipei | Li-Lin Cheng | 8 | 0 | 8 |
