= Curling at the 2007 Asian Winter Games =

- Venue: Changchun Municipal Skating Rink
- Dates: 29 January – 1 February 2007
- Competitors: 40 from 4 nations

Curling at the 2007 Asian Winter Games was held at the Municipal Skating Rink in Changchun, China from 29 January to 1 February 2007.

South Korea won the gold medal in both men and women events.

== Schedule ==
P	Preliminary round	½	Semifinal	F	Final

Event↓/Date →	29th Mon	30th Tue	31st Wed	1st Thu	
Men's team	P	P	P	½	F
Women's team	P	P	P	½	F

== Medalists ==
Event	Gold	Silver	Bronze
Men's team	South Korea; Lee Jae-ho; Beak Jong-chul; Yang Se-young; Kwon Young-il; Park Kwon-il	Japan; Hiroaki Kashiwagi; Jun Nakayama; Takanori Ichimura; Yoichi Nakasato; Yuki Sakamoto	China; Wang Binjiang; Wang Fengchun; Liu Rui; Xu Xiaoming; Zang Jialiang
Women's team	South Korea; Jeong Jin-sook; Kim Ji-suk; Park Mi-hee; Lee Hye-in; Ju Yun-hoa	Japan; Yukako Tsuchiya; Junko Sonobe; Tomoko Sonobe; Mitsuki Sato; Miyuki Sato	China; Liu Yin; Wang Bingyu; Yue Qingshuang; Zhou Yan; Sun Yue

== Medal table ==
Rank	Nation	Gold	Silver	Bronze	Total
1	South Korea (KOR)	2	0	0	2
2	Japan (JPN)	0	2	0	2
3	China (CHN)	0	0	2	2
Totals (3 entries)		2	2	2	6

== Participating nations ==
A total of 40 athletes from 4 nations competed in curling at the 2007 Asian Winter Games:

- China (10)
- Japan (10)
- Kazakhstan (10)
- South Korea (10)

== Final standing ==
=== Men ===
Rank	Team	Pld	W	L
1st place, gold medalist(s)	South Korea	7	5	2
2nd place, silver medalist(s)	Japan	8	5	3
3rd place, bronze medalist(s)	China	7	4	3
4	Kazakhstan	6	0	6

=== Women ===
Rank	Team	Pld	W	L
1st place, gold medalist(s)	South Korea	8	6	2
2nd place, silver medalist(s)	Japan	7	5	2
3rd place, bronze medalist(s)	China	4	3	4
4	Kazakhstan	6	0	6
