= Xu Xiaoming =

Chinese curler (born 1984)

Xu Xiaoming 徐晓明
- Curler
- Born: September 14, 1984 (age 42); Harbin, Heilongjiang

Team
- Curling club: Harbin CC, Harbin, Heilongjiang
- Skip: Xu Xiaoming
- Third: Fei Xueqing
- Second: Li Zhichao
- Lead: Xu Jingtao
- Alternate: Wang Zhenhao

Curling career
- Member Association: China
- World Championship: 9 (2008, 2009, 2010, 2012, 2013, 2014, 2017, 2025, 2026)
- Pacific-Asia Championship: 13 (2002, 2004, 2005, 2006, 2007, 2008, 2009, 2010, 2011, 2012, 2013, 2015, 2016)
- Pan Continental Championship: 2 (2024, 2025)
- Olympic: 3 (2010, 2014, 2026)
- Other appearances: Asian Winter Games: 4 (2003, 2007, 2017, 2025)
Medal record
Men's curling
Representing China
Pan Continental Championships
Gold medal – first place	2024 Lacombe
Pacific-Asia Championships
Gold medal – first place	2007 Beijing
Gold medal – first place	2008 Naseby
Gold medal – first place	2009 Karuizawa
Gold medal – first place	2010 Uiseong
Gold medal – first place	2011 Nanjing
Gold medal – first place	2012 Naseby
Gold medal – first place	2013 Shanghai
Silver medal – second place	2016 Uiseong
Bronze medal – third place	2006 Tokyo
Bronze medal – third place	2015 Almaty
Winter Universiade
Bronze medal – third place	2009 Harbin
Asian Winter Games
Gold medal – first place	2017 Sapporo
Bronze medal – third place	2003 Aomori
Bronze medal – third place	2007 Changchun
Bronze medal – third place	2025 Harbin

Xu Xiaoming (simplified Chinese: 徐晓明; traditional Chinese: 徐曉明; pinyin: Xú Xiǎomíng; born September 14, 1984, in Harbin, Heilongjiang) is a Chinese curler from Beijing.

== Career ==
=== Men's ===
In Xu's early men's career, his team notably won bronze at the 2007 Asian Winter Games and he competed for China at the 2010 Winter Olympics. In Vancouver he threw Second stones for the Chinese team. He also represented China at the 2014 Winter Olympics as the third for the Chinese team.

Xu would return to competitive men's curling as the skip of the Chinese national men's team during the 2024–25 season, alongside Fei Xueqing, Li Zhichao, Xu Jingtao, and Yang Bohao. During their first season together, they would represent China and win the 2024 Pan Continental Curling Championships, beating Japan's Shinya Abe 6–4 in the final. They would also go on to represent China at the 2025 World Men's Curling Championship, where team Xu would finish round-robin play with an 8–4 record, qualifying for the playoffs. They would beat Norway's Magnus Ramsfjell in the quarterfinals, but then lose to Switzerland and Canada in the semifinals and bronze medal game respectively, finishing in 4th place. Team Xu would also represent China as the home nation at the 2025 Asian Winter Games. There, they would go undefeated in round robin play, finishing 5–0, but would lose to the Philippines' Marc Pfister in the semifinals. China would rebound and win the bronze medal game 10–3 over Hong Kong to win bronze.

Based on their performance the previous year, Xu would start the 2025–26 season qualifying for their first Grand Slam of Curling event at the 2025 Masters. At the Masters, they would finish with a 2–2 record, just missing out on the playoffs. Xu would also return to the 2025 Pan Continental Curling Championships, however they were unable to repeat their Pan Continental title, losing this time to Japan's Tsuyoshi Yamaguchi 6–5 in the bronze medal game to finish 4th.

=== Coaching ===
Xu was the head coach of the Chinese Men's Youth Curling Team where he coached the team to win the country's first ever men's World Junior Curling Championship in 2023.

== Personal life ==
Xu is married to Kim Ji-sun who skipped the South Korean Women's National Team at the 2014 Winter Olympics. They have one child.

== Grand Slam record ==
Key
C	Champion
F	Lost in Final
SF	Lost in Semifinal
QF	Lost in Quarterfinals
R16	Lost in the round of 16
Q	Did not advance to playoffs
T2	Played in Tier 2 event
DNP	Did not participate in event
N/A	Not a Grand Slam event that season

Event	2025–26
Masters	Q
The National	Q
Canadian Open	T2
Players' Championship	SF
