= Park Ji-hyun (curler) =

South Korean curler

- Curler
- Born: August 4, 1979 (age 47); South Korea

Team
- Curling club: Kyung Gido Council, Gyeonggi-do

Curling career
- Member Association: South Korea
- World Championship: 1 (2002)
- Pacific-Asia Championship: 6 (2000, 2001, 2002, 2003, 2004, 2007)
Medal record
Women's curling
Representing South Korea
Pacific Championships
Gold medal – first place	2001 Jeonju
Silver medal – second place	2000 Esquimalt
Silver medal – second place	2002 Queenstown
Silver medal – second place	2003 Aomori
Bronze medal – third place	2004 Chuncheon
Bronze medal – third place	2007 Beijing
Asian Winter Games
Silver medal – second place	2003 Aomori

Park Ji-hyun (born August 4, 1979) is a South Korean curler. She was the lead on the South Korean National Women's Curling Team for the 2001–02 curling season.

== Career ==
Park was the lead on Team Kim Mi-yeon which won the Pacific Curling Championships gold medal in 2001, earning the Korean team their first ever appearance at the World Curling Championships. At the 2002 Worlds, the team finished last and without a single win, going 0–9.

Park would only win the Pacific Championship one time, with silver medals in 2000, 2002 and 2003 and bronze medals in 2004 and 2007. Park Ji-hyun would skip the South Korean team in 2007, finishing with a 4–4 round robin record and losing the World Championship berth game to Japan's Moe Meguro.
