= Hiroaki Kashiwagi =

Japanese curler

- Curler ♂
- Born: December 2, 1982

Team
- Curling club: Miyota CC, Nagano

Curling career
- Member Association: Japan
- World Championship: 2 (2000, 2002)
- World Mixed Doubles Championship: 1 (2013)
- Pacific-Asia Championship: 6 (2000, 2001, 2002, 2003, 2004, 2006)
- Other appearances: World Mixed Championship: 1 (2015), World Junior Championships: 5 (1997, 1999, 2000, 2001, 2003), Asian Winter Games: 2 (2003, 2007)
Medal record
Curling
Pacific Championships
Gold medal – first place	2001 Jeonju
Bronze medal – third place	2000 Esquimalt
Bronze medal – third place	2002 Queenstown
Bronze medal – third place	2004 Chuncheon
Asian Winter Games
Silver medal – second place	2003 Aomori
Silver medal – second place	2007 Changchun
Japan Curling Championship
Gold medal – first place	2000 Karuizawa
Gold medal – first place	2001 Tokoro
Gold medal – first place	2002 Tokoro
Gold medal – first place	2003 Karuizawa
Silver medal – second place	1999 Tokoro
Silver medal – second place	2004 Moseushi
Silver medal – second place	2005 Karuizawa

Hiroaki Kashiwagi (柏木 寛昭, Kashiwagi Hiroaki; born December 2, 1982; also known as Hiro Kashiwagi) is a Japanese male curler.

At the international level, he is a 2001 Pacific champion curler, a three-time Pacific bronze medallist (2000, 2002, 2004) and a two-time Asian Winter Games silver medallist (2003, 2007).

At the national level, he is a four-time Japan men's champion curler (2000, 2001, 2002, 2003) and a 2013 Japan mixed doubles champion.

== Teams ==
=== Men's ===
Season	Skip	Third	Second	Lead	Alternate	Coach	Events
1996–97	Makoto Tsuruga	Hiroaki Kashiwagi	Jun Nakayama	Kazuto Yanagizawa	Keita Yanagizawa		WJCC 1997 (4th)
1998–99	Hiroaki Kashiwagi	Jun Nakayama	Kazuto Yanagizawa	Keita Yanagizawa	Takanori Ichimura	Glen Jackson	WJCC 1999 (7th)
1999–00	Hiroaki Kashiwagi	Kazuto Yanagizawa	Takanori Ichimura	Keita Yanagizawa	Yuki Inoue	Akinori Kashiwagi; Kazuyuki Tsuchiya (WJCC)	WJCC 2000 (5th); WCC 2000 (10th)
2000–01	Hiroaki Kashiwagi	Kazuto Yanagizawa	Takanori Ichimura	Keita Yanagizawa	Jun Nakayama		PCC 2000 (bronze)
2000–01	Hiroaki Kashiwagi	Kazuto Yanagizawa	Jun Nakayama	Keita Yanagizawa	Yusuke Morozumi	Akinori Kashiwagi	WJCC 2001 (6th)
2001–02	Hiroaki Kashiwagi	Kazuto Yanagizawa	Jun Nakayama	Keita Yanagizawa	Takanori Ichimura	Akinori Kashiwagi (WCC)	PCC 2001 (gold); WCC 2002 (9th)
2002–03	Hiroaki Kashiwagi	Kazuto Yanagizawa	Jun Nakayama	Keita Yanagizawa	Takanori Ichimura	Akinori Kashiwagi	PCC 2002 (bronze)
2002–03	Hiroaki Kashiwagi	Kazuto Yanagizawa	Yoichi Nakasato	Yusuke Morozumi	Keita Satoh	Akinori Kashiwagi	WJCC 2003 (6th)
2002–03	Hiroaki Kashiwagi	Keita Yanagizawa	Jun Nakayama	Kazuto Yanagizawa	Takanori Ichimura		AWG 2003 (silver)
2003–04	Hiroaki Kashiwagi	Jun Nakayama	Takanori Ichimura	Keita Yanagizawa	Akinori Kashiwagi	Wayne Matthewson	PCC 2003 (4th)
2004–05	Hiroaki Kashiwagi	Jun Nakayama	Keita Yanagizawa	Takanori Ichimura	Keita Satoh	Akinori Kashiwagi, Keith Reilly	PCC 2004 (bronze)
2004–05	Hiroaki Kashiwagi	Jun Nakayama	Takanori Ichimura	Keita Satoh			JMCC 2005 (silver)
2006–07	Hiroaki Kashiwagi	Jun Nakayama	Yuki Sakamoto	Yoichi Nakasato	Takanori Ichimura	Akinori Kashiwagi	PCC 2006 (4th)
2006–07	Hiroaki Kashiwagi	Jun Nakayama	Takanori Ichimura	Yoichi Nakasato	Yuki Sakamoto	Akinori Kashiwagi, Kazuyuki Tsuchiya	AWG 2007 (silver)

=== Mixed ===
Season	Skip	Third	Second	Lead	Coach	Events
2015–16	Hiroaki Kashiwagi	Natsuki Saito	Fukuhiro Ohno	Kotomi Ishizaki	Michiko Tomabechi	WMxCC 2015 (21st)

=== Mixed doubles ===
Season	Male	Female	Events
2012–13	Hiroaki Kashiwagi	Yumiko Sato	WMDCC 2013 (14th)
2017–18	Hiroaki Kashiwagi	Yumiko Kashiwagi	
2018–19	Hiroaki Kashiwagi	Yumiko Kashiwagi	
