= 2009 Pacific Curling Championships =

- Host city: Karuizawa, Japan
- Arena: SCAP Karuizawa Arena
- Dates: November 12–17
- Men's winner: China
- Curling club: Harbin CC, Harbin
- Skip: Wang Fengchun
- Third: Liu Rui
- Second: Xu Xiaoming
- Lead: Li Hongchen
- Alternate: Zong Jialing
- Coach: Zhang Wei
- Finalist: Japan
- Women's winner: China
- Curling club: Harbin CC, Harbin
- Skip: Wang Bingyu
- Third: Liu Yin
- Second: Yue Qingshuang
- Lead: Zhou Yan
- Alternate: Liu Jirli
- Coach: Tan Weidong, Daniel Rafael
- Finalist: Japan

The 2009 Pacific Curling Championships were held Nov. 12–17 at the SCAP Karuizawa Arena in Karuizawa, Japan. The top two teams from the women's and the men's tournaments will qualify for the 2010 World Curling Championships.

== Women's ==
=== Teams ===
Australia	China	Japan	New Zealand	South Korea
Skip: Kim Forge Third: Laurie Weeden; Second: Lyn Gill; Lead: Madeleine Wilson	Skip: Wang Bingyu Third: Liu Yin; Second: Yue Qingshuang; Lead: Zhou Yan	Skip: Moe Meguro Third: Anna Ohmiya; Second: Mari Motohashi; Lead: Kotomi Ishizaki	Skip: Bridget Becker Third: Marisa Jones; Second: Brydie Donald; Lead: Natalie Campbell	Skip: Kim Yeom-yeong Third: Kim Ji-suk; Second: Kang Yoo-ri; Lead: Park Mi-na

=== Standings ===
Country	W	L
China	7	1
Japan	6	2
South Korea	4	4
New Zealand	2	6
Australia	1	7

=== Scores ===
- South Korea 11-4 New Zealand
- China 14-1 Australia
- China 7-5 South Korea
- Japan 9-1 Australia
- China 11-7 Japan
- New Zealand 8-7 Australia
- Japan 7-5 South Korea
- China 9-3 New Zealand
- New Zealand 8-4 Japan
- South Korea 7-5 Australia (11)
- South Korea 7-4 New Zealand
- China 9-2 Australia
- Japan 7-3 Australia
- China 9-2 South Korea
- Japan 7-5 China
- Australia 11-8 New Zealand (11)
- China 8-5 New Zealand
- Japan 9-3 South Korea
- South Korea 10-3 Australia
- Japan 12-1 New Zealand

== Men's ==
=== Teams ===
Australia	China	Chinese Taipei
Skip: Hugh Millikin Third: Ian Palangio; Second: John Theriault; Lead: Ted Bassett	Skip: Liu Rui Third: Xu Xiaoming; Second: Wang Fengchun; Lead: Zang Jialing	Skip: Randolph Shen Third: Nicholas Hsu; Second: Brendon Liu; Lead: Ting-Li Lin
Japan	New Zealand	South Korea
Skip: Yusuke Morozumi Third: Tetsuro Shimizu; Second: Tsuyoshi Yamaguchi; Lead: Kosuke Morozumi	Skip: Dan Mustapic Third: Scott Becker; Second: Warren Kearney; Lead: Warren Dobson	Skip: Kim Chang-min Third: Kim Min-chan; Second: Lim Myung-sup; Lead: Jeong Tae-yeon

=== Standings ===
Country	W	L
China	10	0
Japan	8	2
South Korea	4	6
Australia	4	6
New Zealand	3	7
Chinese Taipei	1	9

=== Scores ===
- Japan 9-3 New Zealand
- South Korea 9-6 Australia (11)
- China 8-7 Chinese Taipei (11)
- China 8-5 New Zealand
- Japan 11-4 Australia
- South Korea 9-6 Chinese Taipei
- China 9-5 South Korea
- Japan 9-8 Chinese Taipei (11)
- New Zealand 4-2 Australia
- New Zealand 9-3 Chinese Taipei
- China 8-3 Australia
- Japan 9-3 South Korea
- China 7-6 Japan (11)
- Australia 7-6 Chinese Taipei
- South Korea 8-1 New Zealand
- Australia 9-7 South Korea
- Japan 7-4 New Zealand
- China 8-2 Chinese Taipei
- China 9-5 New Zealand
- Chinese Taipei 9-4 South Korea
- Japan 10-2 Australia
- Japan 8-0 Chinese Taipei
- China 8-6 South Korea
- Australia 8-4 New Zealand
- New Zealand 8-4 Chinese Taipei
- Japan 8-7 South Korea
- China 8-6 Australia
- Australia 9-8 Chinese Taipei
- China 8-6 Japan
- South Korea 7-3 New Zealand

== Sources ==
- Official site
- Men's results from the World Curling Federation
- Women's results from the World Curling Federation
