= 2000 Pacific Curling Championships =

- Host city: Esquimalt, British Columbia, Canada
- Arena: Esquimalt Curling Club
- Dates: November 8–11
- Men's winner: New Zealand
- Skip: Dan Mustapic
- Third: Sean Becker
- Second: Hans Frauenlob
- Lead: Jim Allan
- Alternate: Lorne De Pape
- Coach: Edwin Harley
- Finalist: Australia (Hugh Millikin)
- Women's winner: Japan
- Skip: Yukari Okazaki
- Third: Emi Fujiwara
- Second: Shinobu Aota
- Lead: Eriko Minatoya
- Alternate: Kotomi Ishizaki
- Finalist: South Korea (Kim Mi-yeon)

The 2000 Pacific Curling Championships were held from November 8 to 11 in Esquimalt, British Columbia, Canada.

New Zealand's Dan Mustapic won the men's event over Australia's Hugh Millikin (it was the second Pacific title for the New Zealand men's team and the first title for skip Dan Mustapic). On the women's side, Japan's Yukari Okazaki defeated South Korea's Kim Mi-yeon in the final (it was the ninth Pacific title for the Japanese women).

By virtue of winning, the New Zealand men's team and the Japanese women's team qualified for the 2001 World Men's and Women's Curling Championships in Lausanne, Switzerland.

It was Australia's turn to host the championships, but due to the lack of dedicated curling ice in the country, it was decided to host the event in Canada instead. When Australia previously hosted the event, it was held in ice hockey arenas. Doing so again would have cost $45,000 (Canadian), while having the event in Esquimalt only costed $7,000.

== Men ==
=== Teams ===
Country	Skip	Third	Second	Lead	Alternate	Coach	Curling club
Australia	Hugh Millikin	Gerald Chick	John Theriault	Stephen Johns			Sydney Harbour CC, Sydney
Japan	Hiroaki Kashiwagi	Kazuto Yanagizawa	Takanori Ichimura	Keita Yanagizawa	Jun Nakayama		Miyota CC
South Korea	Beak Jong-chul	Kwon Young-il	Lim Sung-min	Park Kwon-il			
New Zealand	Dan Mustapic	Sean Becker	Hans Frauenlob	Jim Allan	Lorne De Pape	Edwin Harley	

=== Round Robin ===
Place	Country	Skip	(Australia)	(New Zealand)	(Japan)	(South Korea)	Wins	Losses
1	Australia	Hugh Millikin	*	5:4; 11:4	7:4; 7:2	6:9; 5:3	5	1
2	New Zealand	Dan Mustapic	4:5; 4:11	*	10:2; 8:4	5:4; 7:2	4	2
3	Japan	Hiroaki Kashiwagi	4:7; 2:7	2:10; 4:8	*	7:4; 12:4	2	4
4	South Korea	Beak Jong-chul	9:6; 3:5	4:5; 2:7	4:7; 4:12	*	1	5

Teams to playoffs

=== Playoffs ===
Semifinal		Final
		Australia	4
New Zealand	5	New Zealand	9
Japan	4

Semifinal

Team	1	2	3	4	5	6	7	8	9	10	11	Final
New Zealand (Dan Mustapic)	0	0	0	0	1	0	0	3	0	0	1	5
Japan (Hiroaki Kashiwagi)	0	0	0	0	0	0	1	0	2	1	0	4

Final

Team	1	2	3	4	5	6	7	8	9	10	Final
New Zealand (Dan Mustapic)	1	2	0	1	0	3	1	0	1	X	9
Australia (Hugh Millikin)	0	0	2	0	1	0	0	1	0	X	4

=== Final standings ===
Place	Country	Skip	GP	W	L
1st place, gold medalist(s)	New Zealand	Dan Mustapic	8	6	2
2nd place, silver medalist(s)	Australia	Hugh Millikin	7	5	2
3rd place, bronze medalist(s)	Japan	Hiroaki Kashiwagi	7	2	5
4	South Korea	Beak Jong-chul	6	1	5

== Women ==
=== Teams ===
Country	Skip	Third	Second	Lead	Alternate	Coach
Japan	Yukari Okazaki	Emi Fujiwara	Shinobu Aota	Eriko Minatoya	Kotomi Ishizaki	
South Korea	Kim Mi-yeon	Go Min-kyung	Lee Hyun-jung	Park Ji-hyun	Shun Mi-sung	
New Zealand	Lisa Anderson	Kylie Petherick	Bridget Becker	Karen Rawcliffe	Natalie Campbell	Peter Becker, Sharon Delver

=== Round Robin ===
Place	Country	Skip	(Japan)	(South Korea)	(New Zealand)	Wins	Losses
1	Japan	Yukari Okazaki	*	5:8; 7:6	13:3; 13:3	3	1
2	South Korea	Kim Mi-yeon	8:5; 6:7	*	11:7; 8:1	3	1
3	New Zealand	Lisa Anderson	3:13; 3:13	7:11; 1:8	*	0	4

Teams to playoffs

=== Playoffs ===
Semifinals		Final
		Japan	7
South Korea	13	South Korea	6
New Zealand	3

=== Final standings ===
Place	Country	Skip	GP	W	L
1st place, gold medalist(s)	Japan	Yukari Okazaki	5	4	1
2nd place, silver medalist(s)	South Korea	Kim Mi-yeon	6	4	2
3rd place, bronze medalist(s)	New Zealand	Lisa Anderson	5	0	5
