= Zhou Yan (curler) =

Chinese curler

- Curler ♀
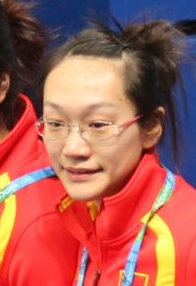
- Born: September 30, 1982 (age 44); Harbin, Heilongjiang, China

Team
- Curling club: Harbin CC, Harbin, Heilongjiang

Curling career
- Member Association: China
- World Championship: 10 (2005, 2006, 2007, 2008, 2009, 2010, 2011, 2012, 2013, 2017)
- Pacific-Asia Championship: 11 (2002, 2004, 2005, 2006, 2007, 2008, 2009, 2011, 2012, 2013, 2016)
- Olympic: 3 (2010, 2014, 2018)
Medal record
Women's curling
Representing China
Olympic Games
Bronze medal – third place	2010 Vancouver
World Championships
Gold medal – first place	2009 Gangneung
Silver medal – second place	2008 Vernon
Bronze medal – third place	2011 Esbjerg
Pacific-Asia Championships
Gold medal – first place	2006 Tokyo
Gold medal – first place	2007 Beijing
Gold medal – first place	2008 Naseby
Gold medal – first place	2009 Karuizawa
Gold medal – first place	2011 Nanjing
Gold medal – first place	2012 Naseby
Silver medal – second place	2004 Chuncheon
Silver medal – second place	2005 Taipei
Silver medal – second place	2010 Uiseong
Silver medal – second place	2016 Uiseong
Asian Winter Games
Gold medal – first place	2017 Sapporo
Bronze medal – third place	2007 Changchun
Winter Universiade
Gold medal – first place	2009 Harbin
New Zealand Winter Games
Silver medal – second place	2009 Naseby

Zhou Yan (Chinese: 周妍; pinyin: Zhōu Yán; Mandarin pronunciation: [ʈʂóʊ jɛ̌n]; born September 30, 1982; usually referred to in the media as Yan Zhou) is a Chinese curler. For many years she plays lead for the Chinese national team, skipped by Wang Bingyu. She won a bronze medal at 2010 Winter Olympics as a member of Chinese National Team.

Zhou curled in her first tournament after having only curled for 2 years, at the 2002 Pacific Curling Championships. At that time she played third for the team. Since then, she has played lead for the team in every tournament except for the 2005 Pacific Championships, when she was the team lead.

Zhou has won 3 Pacific Championships (2006, 2007, 2008), and a World Championship (2009) as a member of the team.

== Teammates ==
2008 Vernon World Championships

2009 Gangneung World Championships

2010 Vancouver Olympic Games

Wang Bingyu, Skip

Liu Yin, Third

Yue Qingshuang, Second

Liu Jinli, Alternate
