= Liu Yin (curler) =

Chinese curler

Liu Yin 柳荫
- Curler
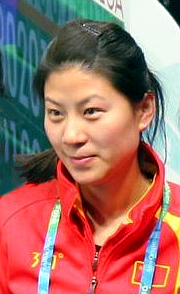
- Born: August 19, 1981 (age 45); Harbin, Heilongjiang

Team
- Curling club: Harbin CC, Harbin, Heilongjiang
- Skip: Wang Bingyu
- Third: Liu Yin
- Second: Yue Qingshuang
- Lead: Zhou Yan
- Alternate: Liu Jinli

Curling career
- World Championship: 8 (2005, 2006, 2007, 2008, 2009, 2010, 2011, 2013)
- Pacific-Asia Championship: 10 (2002, 2004, 2005, 2006, 2007, 2008, 2009, 2010, 2012, 2013)
- Olympic: 2 (2010, 2014)
- Grand Slam victories: 1 (Autumn Gold: 2010)
Medal record
Women's curling
Representing China
Winter Olympics
Bronze medal – third place	2010 Vancouver
World Championships
Gold medal – first place	2009 Gangneung
Silver medal – second place	2008 Vernon
Bronze medal – third place	2011 Esbjerg
Pacific-Asia Championships
Gold medal – first place	2006 Tokyo
Gold medal – first place	2007 Beijing
Gold medal – first place	2008 Naseby
Gold medal – first place	2009 Karuizawa
Gold medal – first place	2012 Naseby
Silver medal – second place	2004 Chuncheon
Silver medal – second place	2005 Taipei
Silver medal – second place	2010 Uiseong
Silver medal – second place	2013 Shanghai
Asian Winter Games
Bronze medal – third place	2003 Aomori
Bronze medal – third place	2007 Changchun
Winter Universiade
Gold medal – first place	2009 Harbin
New Zealand Winter Games
Silver medal – second place	2009 Naseby

Liu Yin (simplified Chinese: 柳荫; traditional Chinese: 柳蔭; pinyin: Liǔ Yìn; born August 19, 1981 in Harbin, Heilongjiang; usually referred to in the media as Yin Liu) is a Chinese curler from Harbin. For many years she played third on the Chinese national team skipped by Wang Bingyu. She won a bronze medal at 2010 Winter Olympics as a member of Chinese National Team.

== Curling career ==
=== 2002–2009 ===
Liu has played internationally for China since 2002, when she was an alternate on the team at the Pacific Curling Championships when she had only been curling for two years.

In 2004, she was a full member of the team. She played third for the team at the 2004 Pacific Championships, and then second at the 2005 World Women's Curling Championship, her first experience at World's. The team finished 7th. The following season, Liu was playing lead for the team for the 2005 Pacific Championships, and then she played third once again at the 2006 Ford World Women's Curling Championship, where the team finished 5th.

For the 2006–07 season, Liu threw last rocks for the team while Wang held the broom as skip. The season included their first Pacific Championship, an Asian Winter Games bronze medal and a disappointing 7th-place finish at the 2007 World Women's Curling Championship.

At the 2007 Pacific Championships, Liu was back throwing second stones when the team won their second Pacific Championship. She was promoted to the third position for the 2008 Ford World Women's Curling Championship in which she earned a silver medal- China's first medal at a World Championship. Since then, Liu has played third for the team. She won her third Pacific Championship in 2008, which was followed by a gold medal at the 2009 Winter Universiade and, most importantly, by a World Championship gold medal at the 2009 World Women's Championship.

=== 2010–2014 ===
Liu Yin competed for Team China at the 2010 Winter Olympics in Vancouver, British Columbia. Her team qualified for the playoffs, but in the Semifinal match they lost to eventual Gold medalists Team Sweden. In the Bronze medal match they faced Team Switzerland skipped by Torino Silver medalist Mirjam Ott. They Chinese pulled off a 12 -6 victory and became the first curling team from an Asian nation to win an Olympic medal.

Just a month after the Olympics, Liu and Team China competed at the 2010 World Championship in Swift Current, Saskatchewan, where they finished a disappointing 7th out of 12 teams. Later in 2010 Liu returned to the Pacific Curling Championship, losing to Korea in the final to earn a silver medal for the third time.

Liu played in the 2011 World Championship, where Team China defeated Team Denmark for the bronze medal. After World's she took some time away from curling, missing the Pacific Championships in 2011 and the World Championships in 2012. Liu returned to international competition in 2012 at the Pacific Championships, where her team won the gold medal for a fifth time.

At the 2013 World Championship Liu and Team China struggled, finishing 9th with a record of 4–7. In the fall, Team China settled for silver at the 2013 Pacific Championships. Playing Korea in the finals, China was up 8-6 only to give up 3 points in the 10th end.

China failed to automatically qualify for the 2014 Winter Olympics and so had to compete in the qualification event to try to earn one of the last two spots. Liu's team won the event, defeating Japan in the final 7–6. At the Olympic games in Sochi Liu failed to make the playoffs, finishing with a record of 4–5.

== Personal life ==
Liu married in 2011. Her husband is an ice hockey coach.

== Teammates ==
2010 Vancouver Olympic Games

2014 Sochi Olympic Games

- Wang Bingyu, Skip
- Liu Yin, Third
- Yue Qingshuang, Second
- Zhou Yan, Lead
