= Wang Bingyu =

Chinese curler

Wang Bingyu 王冰玉
- Curler
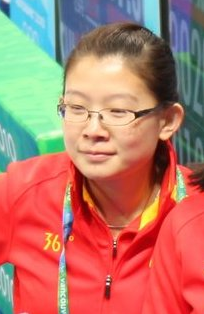
- Born: October 7, 1984 (age 42); Harbin, Heilongjiang, China

Team
- Curling club: Harbin CC, Harbin, Heilongjiang

Curling career
- Member Association: China
- World Championship: 10 (2005, 2006, 2007, 2008, 2009, 2010, 2011, 2012, 2013, 2017)
- Pacific-Asia Championship: 11 (2004, 2005, 2006, 2007, 2008, 2009, 2010, 2011, 2012, 2013, 2016)
- Olympic: 3 (2010, 2014, 2018)
- Grand Slam victories: 1 (2010 Autumn Gold Curling Classic)
Medal record
Women's curling
Representing China
Winter Olympics
Bronze medal – third place	2010 Vancouver
World Championships
Gold medal – first place	2009 Gangneung
Silver medal – second place	2008 Vernon
Bronze medal – third place	2011 Esbjerg
Pacific-Asia Championships
Gold medal – first place	2006 Tokyo
Gold medal – first place	2007 Beijing
Gold medal – first place	2008 Naseby
Gold medal – first place	2009 Karuizawa
Gold medal – first place	2011 Nanjing
Gold medal – first place	2012 Naseby
Silver medal – second place	2004 Chuncheon
Silver medal – second place	2005 Taipei
Silver medal – second place	2010 Uiseong
Silver medal – second place	2013 Shanghai
Silver medal – second place	2016 Uiseong
Pacific Junior Championships
Gold medal – first place	2005 Tokoro
Gold medal – first place	2006 Beijing
Asian Winter Games
Gold medal – first place	2017 Sapporo
Bronze medal – third place	2003 Aomori
Bronze medal – third place	2007 Changchun
Winter Universiade
Gold medal – first place	2009 Harbin
New Zealand Winter Games
Silver medal – second place	2009 Naseby
Silver medal – second place	2011 Naseby

Wang Bingyu (Chinese: 王冰玉; pinyin: Wáng Bīngyù; Mandarin pronunciation: [wǎŋ píŋ ŷ]; born October 7, 1984, in Harbin, Heilongjiang; usually referred to in the media as Bingyu "Betty" Wang) is a Chinese curler. In 2009, she became the first non Northern American or European skip to win a World Championship. She won a bronze medal at 2010 Winter Olympics as a member of Chinese National Team.

== Curling career ==
=== 2001-2008 ===
Wang began curling in 2001. By 2004, she played in her first international event- skipping the Chinese team at the World Junior B Curling Championships. She skipped China at the 2004 Pacific Curling Championships, earning a silver medal.

In 2005, she won gold at the Pacific Junior Curling Championships, but finished in 9th place at that year's World Junior Curling Championships. At her first World Curling Championships later that year, she skipped China to a 7th-place finish with a 4–7 record. At the 2005 Pacific Curling Championships, she earned another silver medal.

In 2006, she won another gold medal at the Pacific Junior Championships, but the team did not play at the World Juniors that year; instead another Chinese team did. At the 2006 Ford World Women's Curling Championship, Wang improved her team's record to 6–5, good enough for 5th place. At the 2006 Pacific Curling Championships, Wang won her first gold medal. At this point, Wang moved from throwing last rocks to throwing third rocks, but still skipping the team. In April 2006 Wang won the Pacific International Cup.

In 2007, Wang won a disappointing bronze medal at the Asian Winter Games. At the 2007 World Women's Curling Championship, she failed to improve on the previous year, finishing with a 5–6 record in 7th place. However, she won her second gold medal at the 2007 Pacific Curling Championships.

The 2007–08 season was a dream season for the Chinese team, as they had a successful stint on the Women's World Curling Tour. They surprised many by winning their first event of the season, the 2007 Boston Pizza Shoot-Out. Their win–loss record on the tour was a respectable 20–16.

It 2008 her team easily won the gold at the 2008 National Winter Games of China.

At the 2008 Ford World Women's Curling Championship, Wang and the Chinese team surprised many by finishing the round robin in first place with a 9–2 record, including a win against the host Canadian team, skipped by Jennifer Jones. They beat the Canadians once again in the 1–2 playoff game, but they were not able to make it three in a row against the Canadians, as they lost in the final. The team won the silver medal, the first ever medal for Chinese team and Pacific team at the World Curling Championships for either gender.

=== 2009-2014 ===
On February 27, 2009, Wang and her teammates won the gold at the 2009 FISU University Winter Games in Harbin, the city where she was born.

In March 2009, Wang became World Champion at the 2009 Mount Titlis World Women's Curling Championship finishing the round robin stage with a 10–1 record and beating Sweden in the final. That title is the first ever World Champions title for China in curling.

Later that year, Wang and her team also became the first non-Canadian team to reach a Grand Slam final, when they lost to Jennifer Jones at the 2009 Trail Appliances Curling Classic.

In February 2010, Wang and her team entered the 2010 Winter Olympics as the defending world champions. Wang skipped her team to a 6–3 record in round robin play, earning a spot in the medal round. After losing to Sweden in the semifinals, China defeated Switzerland to win the bronze medal. The bronze medal was the first Olympic medal for China in curling and the first team medal for China in Winter Olympic history.

In March 2010 at the 2010 Ford World Women's Curling Championship in Swift Current, Wang and her team missed the playoffs with a 6–5 record in the Round Robin stage.

On October 11, 2010, Wang and her team became the first non-Canadian team to win Grand Slam final, beating Desiree Owen at the 2010 Curlers Corner Autumn Gold Curling Classic.

Wang won a bronze medal at the 2011 Capital One World Women's Curling Championship, which would be her last podium appearance at the World Championships. Poor performances at the 2012 (11th) and 2013 (9th) World Championships failed to automatically qualify China for the 2014 Winter Olympics. However, Wang led the Chinese team to win the Olympic qualifying tournament, earning them an entry at the Olympics. At the Games, she led China to 7th-place finish with a 4–5 record.

She announced her retirement from competitive curling on November 22, 2018.

== Personal life ==
Wang is married to Wang Guanshi.

== Teammates ==
Event	Skip	Third	Second	Lead	Alternate	Result
2005 WCC	Wang Bingyu	Yue Qingshuang	Liu Yin	Zhou Yan	Yu Xinna	T7th (4–7)
2006 WCC	Wang Bingyu	Yue Qingshuang	Liu Yin	Zhou Yan	Sun Yue	T5th (6–5)
2007 WCC	Yue Qingshuang (fourth)	Wang Bingyu (skip)	Liu Yin	Zhou Yan	Sun Yue	7th (5–6)
2008 WCC	Wang Bingyu	Liu Yin	Yue Qingshuang	Zhou Yan	Liu Jinli	2nd (9–2)
2009 WCC	Wang Bingyu	Liu Yin	Yue Qingshuang	Zhou Yan	Liu Jinli	1st (10–1)
2010 OG	Wang Bingyu	Liu Yin	Yue Qingshuang	Zhou Yan	Liu Jinli	3rd (6–3)
2010 WCC	Wang Bingyu	Liu Yin	Yue Qingshuang	Zhou Yan	Zhang Xindi	7th (6–5)
2011 WCC	Wang Bingyu	Liu Yin	Yue Qingshuang	Zhou Yan	Yu Xinna	3rd (9–5)
2012 WCC	Wang Bingyu	Yue Qingshuang	Liu Yin	Zhou Yan	Sun Yue	11th (3–7)
2013 WCC	Wang Bingyu	Liu Yin	Yue Qingshuang	Zhou Yan	Liu Jinli	9th (4–7)
2014 OG	Wang Bingyu	Liu Yin	Yue Qingshuang	Zhou Yan	Liu Jinli	7th (4–5)
2017 WCC	Wang Bingyu	Wang Rui	Liu Jinli	Zhou Yan	Yang Ying	11th (2–9)
2018 OG	Wang Bingyu	Zhou Yan	Liu Jinli	Ma Jingyi	Jiang Xindi	5th (4–5)

== Grand Slam record ==
Key
C	Champion
F	Lost in Final
SF	Lost in Semifinal
QF	Lost in Quarterfinals
R16	Lost in the round of 16
Q	Did not advance to playoffs
T2	Played in Tier 2 event
DNP	Did not participate in event
N/A	Not a Grand Slam event that season

Event	2006–07	2007–08	2008–09	2009–10	2010–11	2011–12	2012–13	2013–14	2014–15	2015–16	2016–17	2017–18
Tour Challenge	N/A	N/A	N/A	N/A	N/A	N/A	N/A	N/A	N/A	DNP	DNP	Q
Masters	N/A	N/A	N/A	N/A	N/A	N/A	DNP	Q	DNP	DNP	DNP	DNP
The National	N/A	N/A	N/A	N/A	N/A	N/A	N/A	N/A	N/A	DNP	DNP	Q
Canadian Open	N/A	N/A	N/A	N/A	N/A	N/A	N/A	N/A	DNP	DNP	Q	DNP
Players'	DNP	DNP	DNP	DNP	DNP	DNP	DNP	DNP	DNP	DNP	Q	DNP
Champions Cup	N/A	N/A	N/A	N/A	N/A	N/A	N/A	N/A	N/A	DNP	Q	DNP

=== Former Events ===
Event	2006–07	2007–08	2008–09	2009–10	2010–11	2011–12	2012–13	2013–14
Sobeys Slam	N/A	DNP	QF	N/A	DNP	N/A	N/A	N/A
Autumn Gold	Q	Q	Q	F	C	DNP	Q	F
Manitoba Lotteries	DNP	DNP	DNP	DNP	Q	DNP	DNP	Q
Colonial Square	N/A	N/A	N/A	N/A	N/A	N/A	DNP	DNP
