= Yue Qingshuang =

Chinese curler and coach (born 1985)

Yue Qingshuang 岳清爽
- Curler
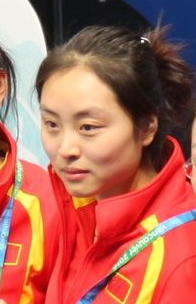
- Born: October 7, 1985 (age 41); Harbin, Heilongjiang

Team
- Curling club: Harbin CC, Harbin, Heilongjiang
- Skip: Wang Bingyu
- Third: Liu Yin
- Second: Yue Qingshuang
- Lead: Zhou Yan
- Alternate: Liu Jinli

Curling career
- World Championship: 9 (2005, 2006, 2007, 2008, 2009, 2010, 2011, 2012, 2013)
- Pacific-Asia Championship: 10 (2002, 2004, 2005, 2006, 2007, 2008, 2009, 2010, 2011, 2012)
- Grand Slam victories: 1 (Autumn Gold: 2010)
Medal record
Women's curling
Representing China
Winter Olympics
Bronze medal – third place	2010 Vancouver
World Championships
Gold medal – first place	2009 Gangneung
Silver medal – second place	2008 Vernon
Bronze medal – third place	2011 Esbjerg
Pacific-Asia Championships
Gold medal – first place	2006 Tokyo
Gold medal – first place	2007 Beijing
Gold medal – first place	2008 Naseby
Gold medal – first place	2009 Karuizawa
Gold medal – first place	2011 Nanjing
Gold medal – first place	2012 Naseby
Silver medal – second place	2004 Chuncheon
Silver medal – second place	2005 Taipei
Silver medal – second place	2010 Uiseong
Pacific Junior Championships
Gold medal – first place	2005 Tokoro
Gold medal – first place	2006 Beijing
Asian Winter Games
Bronze medal – third place	2003 Aomori
Bronze medal – third place	2007 Changchun
Winter Universiade
Gold medal – first place	2009 Harbin
New Zealand Winter Games
Silver medal – second place	2009 Naseby

Yue Qingshuang (Chinese: 岳清爽; pinyin: Yuè Qīngshuǎng; born October 7, 1985, in Harbin, Heilongjiang; usually referred to in the media as Qingshuang Yue) is a Chinese curler. She previously played second on the Chinese national team, skipped by Wang Bingyu. She won a bronze medal at 2010 Winter Olympics as a member of Chinese National Team.

Currently as a coach, Yue guided the Chinese wheelchair curling team to gold medals at the 2018 Winter Paralympics and 2022 Winter Paralympics.

== Biography ==
Yue played in her first international tournament at the 2002 Pacific Curling Championships. Yue skipped the Chinese team, despite having just curled for two years. The team finished the tournament with an 0–8 record.

Yue played in her second Pacific Championships in 2004, this time as the team's second. The team had a much better showing, winning a silver medal. After that, she was promoted to the third position on the team, and subsequently won the 2005 Pacific Junior Curling Championships. They then finished 9th at the 2005 World Junior Championships but improved on their record at the 2005 World Women's Curling Championship where they finished 7th.

At the 2005 Pacific Championships, the team won another silver, followed by another gold medal at the 2006 Pacific Juniors. However, their poor record at the 2005 World Juniors disqualified the team from returning to the 2006 tournament. The team was still in the 2006 Ford World Women's Curling Championship where it had a best ever 5th-place finish. Yue was back playing second on the team at this point.

The team won their first Pacific Curling Championships in 2006, followed by an Asian Winter Games bronze medal in 2007. The team failed to improve on their 5th place World Championship performance of 2006, placing in 7th place at the 2007 World Women's Curling Championship. They won another gold medal at the 2007 Pacific Championships, with Yue temporarily playing third. This was followed by a silver medal at the 2008 Ford World Women's Curling Championship, with Yue back at her normal second position.

The team won gold at the 2008 Pacific Curling Championships and at the 2009 Winter Universiade and they became World Champions at the 2009 Mount Titlis World Women's Curling Championship. At the 2010 Winter Olympics Yue and her teammates won the bronze medal, the first ever Olympic medal in curling for China.

== Teammates ==
2009 Gangneung World Championships

2010 Vancouver Olympic Games

Wang Bingyu, Skip

Liu Yin, Third

Zhou Yan, Lead

Liu Jinli, Alternate
