= Curling at the Asian Winter Games =

- Governing bodies: WC (World)
- Events: 3 (men: 1; women: 1; mixed: 1)

Games
- 1986; 1990; 1996; 1999; 2003; 2007; 2011; 2017; 2025
- Medalists

Curling was an event at the Asian Winter Games in 2003 and 2007. The event returned to the sports program in 2017 after missing 2011. In 2025, mixed doubles was introduced.

== Events ==
Event	03	07	17	25	Years
Men's team	X	X	X	X	4
Women's team	X	X	X	X	4
Mixed doubles				X	1
Total	2	2	2	3	

== Summaries ==
=== Men's team ===
Games	Gold	Silver	Bronze
2003 Aomori	South Korea	Japan	China
2007 Changchun	South Korea	Japan	China
2017 Sapporo	China	Japan	South Korea
2025 Harbin	Philippines	South Korea	China

=== Women's team ===
Games	Gold	Silver	Bronze
2003 Aomori	Japan	South Korea	China
2007 Changchun	South Korea	Japan	China
2017 Sapporo	China	South Korea	Japan
2025 Harbin	South Korea	China	Japan

=== Mixed doubles ===
Games	Gold	Silver	Bronze
2025 Harbin	Japan	South Korea	China

== Medal table ==
Rank	Nation	Gold	Silver	Bronze	Total
1	South Korea (KOR)	4	4	1	9
2	Japan (JPN)	2	4	2	8
3	China (CHN)	2	1	6	9
4	Philippines (PHI)	1	0	0	1
Totals (4 entries)		9	9	9	27

== Participating nations ==
=== Men's team ===
Team	(Japan) 2003	(China) 2007	(Japan) 2017	(China) 2025	Years
China	3rd	3rd	1st	3rd	4
Chinese Taipei	4th		4th	7th	3
Hong Kong				4th	1
Japan	2nd	2nd	2nd	5th	4
Kazakhstan		4th	5th	5th	3
Kyrgyzstan				9th	1
Philippines				1st	1
Qatar			6th	8th	2
Saudi Arabia				10th	1
South Korea	1st	1st	3rd	2nd	4
Thailand				11th	1
Total	4	4	6	11	

=== Women's team ===
Team	(Japan) 2003	(China) 2007	(Japan) 2017	(China) 2025	Years
China	3rd	3rd	1st	2nd	4
Chinese Taipei	4th			7th	2
Hong Kong				6th	1
Japan	1st	2nd	3rd	3rd	4
Kazakhstan		4th	4th	4th	3
Philippines				5th	1
Qatar			5th	9th	2
South Korea	2nd	1st	2nd	1st	4
Thailand				8th	1
Total	4	4	5	9	

=== Mixed doubles ===
Team	(China) 2025	Years
China	3rd	1
Chinese Taipei	5th	1
Hong Kong	5th	1
Japan	1st	1
Kazakhstan	7th	1
Kuwait	10th	1
Kyrgyzstan	9th	1
Mongolia	12th	1
Philippines	4th	1
Qatar	11th	1
South Korea	2nd	1
Thailand	8th	1
Total	12	
