= Hugh Millikin =

Canadian-Australian curler (born 1957)

- Curler
- Born: 4 July 1957 (age 69); North Vancouver, British Columbia

Team
- Skip: Hugh Millikin
- Fourth: Dean Hewitt
- Third: Tanner Davis
- Second: Steve Johns
- Alternate: Steve Hewitt

Curling career
- Member Association: Ontario (1985-1986); Australia (1991-present)
- World Championship: 11 (1992, 1993, 1994, 1995, 1996, 1997, 1998, 2005, 2006, 2007, 2008)
- World Mixed Doubles Championship: 2 (2010, 2011)
- Pacific-Asia Championship: 24 (1991, 1992, 1993, 1994, 1995, 1996, 1997, 1998, 1999, 2000, 2001, 2002, 2003, 2004, 2005, 2006, 2007, 2008, 2009, 2010, 2011, 2012, 2013, 2017)
- Pan Continental Championship: 2 (2024, 2025)
- Olympic: 1 (1992)
Medal record
Men's curling
Representing Australia
World Senior Curling Championships
| Bronze medal – third place | 2010 Chelyabinsk |
| Bronze medal – third place | 2011 St. Paul |
| Bronze medal – third place | 2014 Dumfries |
Pacific Championships
| Gold medal – first place | 1991 Sagamihara |
| Gold medal – first place | 1992 Karuizawa |
| Gold medal – first place | 1993 Adelaide |
| Gold medal – first place | 1994 Christchurch |
| Gold medal – first place | 1995 Tokoro |
| Gold medal – first place | 1996 Sydney |
| Gold medal – first place | 1997 Karuizawa |
| Gold medal – first place | 2005 Taipei |
| Gold medal – first place | 2006 Tokyo |
| Silver medal – second place | 1999 Tokoro |
| Silver medal – second place | 2000 Esquimalt |
| Silver medal – second place | 2002 Queenstown |
| Silver medal – second place | 2003 Aomori |
| Silver medal – second place | 2004 Chuncheon |
| Silver medal – second place | 2007 Beijing |
| Bronze medal – third place | 1998 Qualicum Beach |
| Bronze medal – third place | 2001 Jeonju |
| Bronze medal – third place | 2010 Uiseong |
| Bronze medal – third place | 2012 Naseby |
New Zealand Winter Games
| Gold medal – first place | 2009 Naseby |
| Bronze medal – third place | 2011 Naseby |

Hugh Ronald Alexander Millikin (born 4 July 1957 in North Vancouver, British Columbia) is an Australian curler originally from Ottawa, Ontario.

== Career ==
In 1986, while still residing in the Canadian province of Ontario, Millikin played second position for Dave Van Dine's Canadian Mixed Curling Championship team.

Millikin would later move to Australia and has skipped the Australian team to nine Pacific Curling Championships titles. Millikin has also participated in 11 World Curling Championships. The team's top placements have been sixth place in 1992, 1993 and 2008. Millikin also went to the 1992 Winter Olympics, skipping the Australian team to a seventh-place finish in the demonstration event.

Millikin and his team used travel back to his hometown Ottawa to practice and to participate in local curling tournaments. Their team coach was Earle Morris, father of John Morris.

At the 2008 World Men's Curling Championship, he skipped Australia to a 5–6 record, the most wins ever for Australia. The team came an end short from forcing a tie-breaker.

The Australian team missed qualification for the 2010 Winter Olympics by 0.5 points, finishing ranked 11th in the world, with only the top ten qualifying for the games.

== Awards ==
- Colin Campbell Award - 1993
- Australian Sports Medal - 2000
