= 2006 Pacific Curling Championships =

2006 Pacific Curling Championship
- Host city: Tokyo, Japan
- Men's winner: Australia
- Skip: Hugh Millikin
- Fourth: Ian Palangio
- Second: Sean Hall
- Lead: Mike Woloschuk
- Alternate: David Imlah
- Finalist: South Korea (Lee Jae Ho)
- Women's winner: China
- Skip: Wang Bingyu
- Fourth: Liu Yin
- Second: Yue Qingshuang
- Lead: Zhou Yan
- Alternate: Sun Yue
- Finalist: South Korea (Jin-Sook Jeung)

The 2006 Pacific Curling Championships were held in Tokyo, Japan Nov. 21-26.

== Men's ==
=== Final round-robin standings ===
Country	Skip	W	L
South Korea	Lee Jae Ho	4	1
Australia	Hugh Millikin	4	1
China	Wang Bin Jiang	3	2
Japan	Hiroaki Kashiwagi	2	3
New Zealand	Dan Mustapic	2	3
Chinese Taipei	Nicolas Hsu	0	5

=== Playoffs ===
- Tie breaker: Japan 8-4 New Zealand
- Semifinals (best of 3):
  - South Korea 4-3 Japan (11); South Korea 8-4 Japan
  - Australia 8-3 China; China 5-4 Australia (11); Australia 8-6 China
- 5th place: New Zealand 7-5 Chinese Taipei
- Bronze: China 9-8 Japan (11)
- Gold: Australia 8-5 South Korea

== Women's ==
=== Final round-robin standings ===
Country	Skip	W	L
South Korea	Jeung Jin-Sook	3	1
China	Wang Bingyu	3	1
Japan	Moe Meguro	3	1
New Zealand	Bridget Becker	1	3
Chinese Taipei	Cheng Li-Lin	0	4

=== Playoffs ===
- Semifinals (best of 3)
  - South Korea 8-5 New Zealand; South Korea 8-1 New Zealand
  - China 6-4 Japan; China 9-6 Japan
- Bronze: Japan 10-3 New Zealand
- Gold: China 8-3 South Korea
