= 2005 Pacific Curling Championships =

- Host city: Taipei, Chinese Taipei
- Arena: Taipei Arena
- Dates: December 2–7
- Men's winner: Australia
- Skip: Hugh Millikin
- Fourth: Ian Palangio
- Second: Ricky Tasker
- Lead: Mike Woloschuk
- Finalist: Japan (Yoshiyuki Ohmiya)
- Women's winner: Japan
- Skip: Yukako Tsuchiya
- Third: Junko Sonobe
- Second: Tomoko Sonobe
- Lead: Chiemi Kameyama
- Alternate: Mitsuki Sato
- Coach: Edward Dezura
- Finalist: China (Wang Bingyu)

The 2005 Pacific Curling Championships were held at the Taipei Arena in Taipei, Republic of China (Taiwan) from December 2 to 7.

Australia's Hugh Millikin won the men's event over Japan's Yoshiyuki Ohmiya. By virtue of reaching the finals, both nations qualified for the 2006 World Men's Curling Championship in Lowell, Massachusetts.

On the women's side, Japan's Yukako Tsuchiya defeated China's Wang Bingyu in the final. This qualified both Japan and China for the 2006 Ford World Women's Curling Championship in Grande Prairie, Alberta.

== Men's ==
=== Final round-robin standings ===
| Country | Skip | W | L |
|---|---|---|---|
| New Zealand | Sean Becker | 4 | 1 |
| China | Xu Xiaoming | 4 | 1 |
| Australia | Hugh Millikin | 3 | 2 |
| Japan | Yoshiyuki Ohmiya | 2 | 3 |
| South Korea | Baek Jong Chul | 1 | 4 |
| Chinese Taipei | Nicolas Hsu | 1 | 4 |

=== Playoffs ===
Semifinals
1 | New Zealand | 11 | 4 | 4
4 | Japan | 6 | 8 | 6
2 | China | 3 | 8 | 7
3 | Australia | 6 | 5 | 8

Finals
4 | Japan | 3
3 | Australia | 6
Bronze medal
1 | New Zealand | 8
2 | China | 3

| 5th place |
| 5 | South Korea | 2 |
| 6 | Chinese Taipei | 11 |

== Women's ==
=== Final round-robin standings ===
| Country | Skip | W | L |
|---|---|---|---|
| China | Wang Bingyu | 4 | 1 |
| Japan | Yukako Tsuchiya | 4 | 1 |
| New Zealand | Bridget Becker | 3 | 2 |
| South Korea | Kim Ji Suk | 2 | 3 |
| Chinese Taipei | Cheng Li-Lin | 1 | 4 |
| Australia | Helen Wright | 1 | 4 |

=== Playoffs ===
Semifinals
1 | China | 10 | 5 | 10
4 | South Korea | 3 | 6 | 5
2 | Japan | 8 | 11 | –
3 | New Zealand | 7 | 3 | –

Finals
1 | China | 5
2 | Japan | 10
Bronze medal
3 | New Zealand | 6
4 | South Korea | 10

| 5th place |
| 5 | Chinese Taipei | 10 |
| 6 | Australia | 9 |
