= 2004 Pacific Curling Championships =

- Host city: Chuncheon, South Korea
- Arena: Euiam Ice Rink
- Dates: November 20–25
- Men's winner: New Zealand
- Curling club: Ranfurly Curling Club, Ranfurly, New Zealand
- Skip: Sean Becker
- Third: Hans Frauenlob
- Second: Dan Mustapic
- Lead: Lorne De Pape
- Alternate: Warren Dobson
- Finalist: Australia (Hugh Millikin)
- Women's winner: Japan
- Curling club: Aomori Curling Club, Aomori
- Skip: Yumie Funayama
- Third: Ayumi Ogasawara
- Second: Sakurako Terada
- Lead: Moe Meguro
- Alternate: Mari Motohashi
- Finalist: China (Wang Bingyu)

The 2004 Pacific Curling Championships were held at the Euiam Ice Rink in Chuncheon, South Korea from November 20 to 25.

New Zealand's Sean Becker won the men's event over Australia's Hugh Millikin. By virtue of reaching the finals, both nations qualified for the 2005 Ford World Men's Curling Championship in Victoria, British Columbia.

On the women's side, Japan's Yumie Funayama defeated China's Wang Bingyu in the final. This qualified both Japan and China for the 2005 World Women's Curling Championship in Paisley, Scotland.

== Men's ==
=== Final Round Robin Standings ===
Country	Skip	W	L
Australia	Hugh Millikin	4	1
New Zealand	Sean Becker	4	1
Japan	Hiroaki Kashiwagi	3	2
China	Xu Xiaoming	3	2
South Korea	Baek Jong Chul	1	4
Chinese Taipei	Brendon Liu	0	5

=== Playoffs ===
Semifinals
1	Australia	5	11	6
4	China	6	4	3
1	New Zealand	8	3	7
2	Japan	4	5	5

Finals
1	Australia	8
2	New Zealand	9
Bronze medal
3	Japan	11
4	China	6

5th place
5	South Korea	9
6	Chinese Taipei	5

== Women's ==
=== Final Round Robin Standings ===
Country	Skip	W	L
China	Wang Bingyu	4	1
South Korea	Kim Mi-yeon	4	1
Japan	Yumie Funayama	4	1
New Zealand	Bridget Becker	2	3
Australia	Helen Williams	1	4
Chinese Taipei	Cheng Li-Lin	0	5

=== Playoffs ===
Semifinals
1	China	12	10	–
4	New Zealand	8	6	–
2	South Korea	4	6	–
3	Japan	5	8	–

Finals
1	China	8
3	Japan	9
Bronze medal
4	New Zealand	6
2	South Korea	10

5th place
5	Australia	12
6	Chinese Taipei	9
