= Pacific-Asia Curling Championships =

Curling tournament

- Established: 1991
- Abolished: 2021

The Pacific-Asia Curling Championships (formerly the Pacific Curling Championships) were an annual curling tournament, held every year in November or December. The event served as a qualified for the World Curling Championships. The Pacific-Asia Curling Championships consisted of teams from Australia, China, Taiwan, Hong Kong, Japan, Kazakhstan, New Zealand, Qatar, Saudi Arabia and South Korea. At the 2018 WCF Congress it was announced that Nigeria would be the first African country accepted as member and would compete in the PAC zone beginning in 2019. Tournaments have been played in Canada, but Canada has never participated, since it is not part of the Pacific Zone.

The event was last held in 2021, and was replaced with the Pan Continental Curling Championships, which would include teams from the Americas as well.

== Summary ==
=== Men ===
| Year | Location | Final | | | Third-place match |
| Year | Location | Champion | Score | Second Place | Third Place | Score | Fourth Place |
|---|---|---|---|---|---|---|---|
| 1991 | (Japan) Sagamihara | Australia | – | Japan | New Zealand | – | – |
| 1992 | (Japan) Karuizawa | Australia | – | Japan | – | – | – |
| 1993 | (Australia) Adelaide | Australia | 9–5 | Japan | New Zealand | – | – |
| 1994 | (New Zealand) Christchurch | Australia | 6–4 | Japan | New Zealand | – | – |
| 1995 | (Japan) Tokoro | Australia | 7–2 | Japan | New Zealand | – | – |
| 1996 | (Australia) Sydney | Australia | 7–4 | Japan | New Zealand | – | South Korea |
| 1997 | (Japan) Karuizawa | Australia | 10–4 | Japan | New Zealand | – | South Korea |
| 1998 | (Canada) Qualicum Beach | New Zealand | 10–6 | Japan | Australia | – | South Korea |
| 1999 | (Japan) Tokoro | Japan | 6–2 | Australia | New Zealand | – | South Korea |
| 2000 | (Canada) Esquimalt | New Zealand | 9–4 | Australia | Japan | – | South Korea |
| 2001 | (South Korea) Jeonju | Japan | 6–5 | New Zealand | Australia | – | South Korea |
| 2002 | (New Zealand) Queenstown | South Korea | 5–2 | Australia | Japan | 8–7 | New Zealand |
| 2003 | (Japan) Aomori | New Zealand | 6–5 | Australia | South Korea | 11–4 | Japan |
| 2004 | (South Korea) Chuncheon | New Zealand | 9–8 | Australia | Japan | 11–6 | China |
| 2005 | (Chinese Taipei) Taipei | Australia | 6–3 | Japan | New Zealand | 8–3 | China |
| 2006 | (Japan) Tokyo | Australia | 8–5 | South Korea | China | 9–8 | Japan |
| 2007 | (China) Beijing | China | 9–2 | Australia | New Zealand | 10–7 | Japan |
| 2008 | (New Zealand) Naseby | China | 8–5 | Japan | New Zealand | 7–6 | South Korea |
| 2009 | (Japan) Karuizawa | China | 8–3 | Japan | South Korea | 8–7 | Australia |
| 2010 | (South Korea) Uiseong | China | 9–3 | South Korea | Australia | 9–4 | New Zealand |
| 2011 | (China) Nanjing | China | 5–2 | New Zealand | South Korea | 9–2 | Australia |
| 2012 | (New Zealand) Naseby | China | 6–2 | Japan | Australia | 10–7 | South Korea |
| 2013 | (China) Shanghai | China | 9–6 | Japan | South Korea | 7–6 | New Zealand |
| 2014 | (Japan) Karuizawa | China | 7–5 | Japan | South Korea | 7–4 | Australia |
| 2015 | (Kazakhstan) Almaty | South Korea | 11–7 | Japan | China | 5–4 | New Zealand |
| 2016 | (South Korea) Uiseong | Japan | 5–3 | China | South Korea | 8–6 | Chinese Taipei |
| 2017 | (Australia) Erina | South Korea | 9–8 | China | Japan | 11–4 | Australia |
| 2018 | (South Korea) Gangneung | Japan | 9–7 | China | South Korea | 9–8 | New Zealand |
| 2019 | (China) Shenzhen | South Korea | 11–2 | Japan | China | 9–4 | New Zealand |
| 2020 | (Japan) Wakkanai | Cancelled | | | Cancelled |
| 2021 | (Kazakhstan) Almaty | South Korea | 9–5 | Japan | Chinese Taipei | 9–8 | Kazakhstan |

=== Women ===
| Year | Location | Final | | | Third-place match |
| Year | Location | Champion | Score | Second Place | Third Place | Score | Fourth Place |
|---|---|---|---|---|---|---|---|
| 1991 | (Japan) Sagamihara | Japan | 8–6 | Australia | – | – | – |
| 1992 | (Japan) Karuizawa | No tournament held | | | No tournament held |
| 1993 | (Australia) Adelaide | Japan | – | Australia | New Zealand | – | – |
| 1994 | (New Zealand) Christchurch | Japan | 12–1 | Australia | New Zealand | – | – |
| 1995 | (Japan) Tokoro | Japan | – | Australia | New Zealand | – | – |
| 1996 | (Australia) Sydney | Japan | – | Australia | New Zealand | – | South Korea |
| 1997 | (Japan) Karuizawa | Japan | 9–2 | New Zealand | South Korea | – | – |
| 1998 | (Canada) Qualicum Beach | Japan | – | New Zealand | Australia | – | South Korea |
| 1999 | (Japan) Tokoro | Japan | 7–3 | South Korea | New Zealand | – | – |
| 2000 | (Canada) Esquimalt | Japan | 7–6 | South Korea | New Zealand | – | – |
| 2001 | (South Korea) Jeonju | South Korea | 7–5 | Japan | Australia | – | New Zealand |
| 2002 | (New Zealand) Queenstown | Japan | 8–3 | South Korea | New Zealand | 11–4 | Australia |
| 2003 | (Japan) Aomori | Japan | 7–3 | South Korea | New Zealand | 13–3 | Australia |
| 2004 | (South Korea) Chuncheon | Japan | 9–8 | China | South Korea | 10–6 | New Zealand |
| 2005 | (Chinese Taipei) Taipei | Japan | 10–5 | China | South Korea | 10–6 | New Zealand |
| 2006 | (Japan) Tokyo | China | 8–3 | South Korea | Japan | 10–3 | New Zealand |
| 2007 | (China) Beijing | China | – | Japan | South Korea | – | Australia |
| 2008 | (New Zealand) Naseby | China | 9–4 | South Korea | Japan | – | New Zealand |
| 2009 | (Japan) Karuizawa | China | 10–3 | Japan | South Korea | 8–5 | New Zealand |
| 2010 | (South Korea) Uiseong | South Korea | 10–7 | China | Japan | 7–4 | New Zealand |
| 2011 | (China) Nanjing | China | 11–3 | South Korea | New Zealand | 8–4 | Japan |
| 2012 | (New Zealand) Naseby | China | 10–4 | Japan | South Korea | 9–3 | Australia |
| 2013 | (China) Shanghai | South Korea | 9–8 | China | Japan | 11–3 | New Zealand |
| 2014 | (Japan) Karuizawa | China | 7–6 | South Korea | Japan | 8–4 | New Zealand |
| 2015 | (Kazakhstan) Almaty | Japan | 8–7 | South Korea | China | 16–0 | Kazakhstan |
| 2016 | (South Korea) Uiseong | South Korea | 5–3 | China | Japan | 10–3 | New Zealand |
| 2017 | (Australia) Erina | South Korea | 11–6 | Japan | China | 8–3 | Hong Kong |
| 2018 | (South Korea) Gangneung | South Korea | 12–8 | Japan | China | 8–3 | Hong Kong |
| 2019 | (China) Shenzhen | China | 10–3 | Japan | South Korea | 13–2 | Hong Kong |
| 2020 | (Japan) Wakkanai | Cancelled | | | Cancelled |
| 2021 | (Kazakhstan) Almaty | Japan | 6–5 | South Korea | Kazakhstan | – | Hong Kong |

== Medal summary ==
=== Men's ===
| Rank | Nation | Gold | Silver | Bronze | Total |
|---|---|---|---|---|---|
| 1 | Australia (AUS) | 9 | 6 | 4 | 19 |
| 2 | China (CHN) | 8 | 3 | 3 | 14 |
| 3 | South Korea (KOR) | 5 | 2 | 7 | 14 |
| 4 | Japan (JPN) | 4 | 17 | 4 | 25 |
| 5 | New Zealand (NZL) | 4 | 2 | 10 | 16 |
| 6 | Chinese Taipei (TPE) | 0 | 0 | 1 | 1 |
| Totals (6 entries) | | 30 | 30 | 29 | 89 |

=== Women's ===
| Rank | Nation | Gold | Silver | Bronze | Total |
|---|---|---|---|---|---|
| 1 | Japan (JPN) | 15 | 7 | 6 | 28 |
| 2 | China (CHN) | 8 | 5 | 3 | 16 |
| 3 | South Korea (KOR) | 6 | 10 | 7 | 23 |
| 4 | Australia (AUS) | 0 | 5 | 2 | 7 |
| 5 | New Zealand (NZL) | 0 | 2 | 9 | 11 |
| 6 | Kazakhstan (KAZ) | 0 | 0 | 1 | 1 |
| Totals (6 entries) | | 29 | 29 | 28 | 86 |
