= Japan Curling Championships =

Japanese national curling championships

- Established: Men's: 1984; Women's: 1988
- 2026 host city: Yokohama, Kanagawa
- 2026 arena: Yokohama Buntai

Current champions (2026)
- Men: (Nagano Prefecture) SC Karuizawa Club (Tsuyoshi Yamaguchi)
- Women: (Nagano Prefecture) SC Karuizawa Club (Miyu Ueno)

Current edition
- 2026 Japan Curling Championships

The Japan Curling Championships (Japanese: 日本カーリング選手権) are the annual Japanese men's and women's curling championships, organized by the Japan Curling Association (JCA). The winners get to represent Japan at the men's and women's World Curling Championships and the next season's Pacific-Asia Curling Championships.

== Summary ==
=== Qualification ===
The following teams have the right to participate to this championship.

In 2019 (2018–2019 season)

- Last year's winners and runner-up teams.
- Teams represented Japan at 2018 Winter Olympics.
- Teams that won the regional championships (top 3 of Hokkaido, 1 of Tohoku, 1 of Kanto, 1 of Chubu and 1 of Western Japan).

After 2020 (after 2019–2020 season)

- Last year's winners and runner-up teams.
- Top ranked teams in top 50 on WCT ranking at end of last October (without last year's winners and runner-up teams).
- Teams that won the regional championships (Hokkaido, Tohoku, Kanto, Chubu and Western Japan).
- Winners of wild-card games by runner-up teams in regional championships.

=== Format ===
Round-robins by 9 teams and Page playoffs by qualified 4 teams.

=== Team names ===
In Japan, curling teams have historically used freely nicknames instead of the skip name. However, the JCA restricted the names that teams could use in the championship tournament in 2005, to one of the following: the skip's surname, organization name, association name, residential regional name, or the school name for the championships.

=== Championships ===
Edition	Year	Date(s)	Host city	Arena	Teams	
Edition	Year	Date(s)	Host city	Arena	Men	Women
1	1984	February 26	Sapporo, Hokkaido	Makomanai Ice Arena	3	—N/a
2	1985	February 24	Sapporo, Hokkaido	Makomanai Ice Arena	3	—N/a
3	1986	February 23	Sapporo, Hokkaido	Makomanai Ice Arena	3	—N/a
4	1987	February 21 – 22	Sapporo, Hokkaido	Makomanai Ice Arena	7	—N/a
5	1988	February 26 – 28	Sapporo, Hokkaido	Makomanai Ice Arena	10	4
6	1989	March 10 – 12	Sapporo, Hokkaido	Makomanai Ice Arena	12	6
7	1990	February 24 – 26	Sapporo, Hokkaido	Makomanai Ice Arena	12	6
8	1991	March 1 – 3	Tokoro, Hokkaido	Tokoro Curling Hall	12	6
9	1992	February 28 – March 3	Tokoro, Hokkaido	Tokoro Curling Hall	12	8
10	1993	February 26 – 28	Obihiro, Hokkaido	Obihiro-no-mori Ice Arena	12	8
11	1994	March 19 – 21	Karuizawa, Nagano	Kazakoshi Park Arena	12	6
12	1995	March 8 – 12	Karuizawa, Nagano	Kazakoshi Park Arena	8	8
13	1996	February 28 – March 3	Karuizawa, Nagano	Kazakoshi Park Arena	8	8
14	1997	February 19 – 23	Karuizawa, Nagano	Kazakoshi Park Arena	8	8
15	1998	March 4 – 8	Tokoro, Hokkaido	Tokoro Curling Hall	8	8
16	1999	February 24 – 28	Tokoro, Hokkaido	Tokoro Curling Hall	10	10
17	2000	February 23 – 27	Karuizawa, Nagano	Kazakoshi Park Arena	9	9
18	2001	February 21 – 25	Tokoro, Hokkaido	Tokoro Curling Hall	9	9
19	2002	February 27 – March 4	Tokoro, Hokkaido	Tokoro Curling Hall	9	9
20	2003	February 25 – March 2	Karuizawa, Nagano	Kazakoshi Park, SCAP Karuizawa	9	9
21	2004	February 23 – 29	Moseushi, Hokkaido	Moseushi Curling Hall	9	8
22	2005	Men: March 23 – 27	Karuizawa, Nagano	Kazakoshi Park, SCAP Karuizawa	10	—
22	2005	Women: February 23 – 27	Tokoro, Hokkaido	Tokoro Curling Hall	—	9
23	2006	Men: March 1 – 5	Karuizawa, Nagano	Kazakoshi Park, SCAP Karuizawa	9	—
23	2006	Women: March 8 – 12	Aomori, Aomori	Aomori City Sports Complex	—	9
24	2007	Men: February 28 – March 4	Tokoro, Hokkaido	Tokoro Curling Hall	9	—
24	2007	Women: February 21 – 25	Moseushi, Hokkaido	Moseushi Curling Hall	—	9
25	2008	February 6 – 11	Karuizawa, Nagano	Kazakoshi Park, SCAP Karuizawa	9	9
26	2009	February 10 – 15	Aomori, Aomori	Aomori City Sports Complex	9	9
27	2010	March 6 – 11	Tokoro, Hokkaido	Tokoro Curling Hall	9	9
28	2011	February 8 – 13	Nayoro, Hokkaido	Sunpillar Park	8	8
29	2012	February 9 – 14	Aomori, Aomori	Aomori City Sports Complex	8	8
30	2013	February 12–17	Sapporo, Hokkaido	Hokkaido Bank Curling Stadium	8	8
31	2014	March 2–9	Karuizawa, Nagano	Kazakoshi Park, Karuizawa Ice Park	9	9
32	2015	February 8–15	Tokoro, Hokkaido	ADVICS Tokoro Curling Hall	9	9
33	2016	February 6–13	Aomori, Aomori	Michigin Dream Stadium	9	9
34	2017	January 30 – February 5	Karuizawa, Nagano	Kazakoshi Park, Karuizawa Ice Park	9	9
35	2018	January 28 – February 4	Nayoro, Hokkaido	Sunpillar Park	9	9
36	2019	February 11–17	Sapporo, Hokkaido	Hokkaido Bank Curling Stadium	9	9
37	2020	February 8–16	Karuizawa, Nagano	Kazakoshi Park, Karuizawa Ice Park	9	9
38	2021	February 8–14	Wakkanai, Hokkaido	Wakkanai City Green Sports Park	7	7
39	2022	May 22–29	Tokoro, Hokkaido	Tokoro Curling Club	9	9
40	2023	January 29 – February 5	Tokoro, Hokkaido	Tokoro Curling Club	9	9
41	2024	January 28 – February 4	Sapporo, Hokkaido	Hokkaido Bank Curling Stadium	10	10
42	2025	February 2–9	Yokohama, Kanagawa	Yokohama Buntai	10	10
43	2026	June 7–14	Yokohama, Kanagawa	Yokohama Buntai	10	10

== Results ==
=== Men ===
Edition	Year	Winners	Runner-up	3rd
1	1984	Team: Red Pajamas ( Hokkaido); Katsuo Hara, Shigeru Kosugi, Satoru Asakawa, Kenji Tada, Kazuyuki Man	Team: Sapporo Penguin ( Hokkaido); Kimio Soji, Kuniyasu Tada, Mitsuhiro Higashikawa, Yoshinori Kasai	Team: Victory ( Hokkaido); Yuji Yamauchi, Masaaki Yokoyama, Eiichi Kamogawa, Keiji Ito, Fukushige Sato
2	1985	Team: Big Marin ( Hokkaido); Masami Saito, Yoshiaki Hori, Manabu Isoya, Atsushi Nasu, Koji Ishigaki	Team: Subellows ( Hokkaido); Shinroku Yamauchi, Shigeyoshi Omi, Koichi Funayama, Hideaki Karasawa, Kazuo Tsunoda	Team: Chasers ( Hokkaido); Toru Uesugi, Shuichi Morisawa, Tsutomu Kobayashi, Tsutomu Onodera, Yoshikazu Uchida
3	1986	Team: Tokyo Max ( Tokyo); Hiroyuki Saito, Hiroshi Kobayashi, Junichiro Mitsuno, Hiroyuki Imanari	Team: Matsudo Maple ( Chiba); Masatoshi Horii, Hiroshi Nagakubo, Shinichi Kimura, Mitsuhiro Toriyabe, Koji Tanaka	Team: Ebeotsu Business Association ( Hokkaido); Shigeo Morimoto, Keiji Hayami, Shuji Ueda, Hirotaka Ukena, Masayasu Tanioka
4	1987	Team: Tokyo Max ( Tokyo); Hiroshi Kobayashi, Junichiro Mitsuno, Hiroyuki Imanari, Masamitsu Honda	Team: Nayoro Skyroad ( Hokkaido); Hiroyuki Kubota, Kenji Sugawara, Michio Hayashi, Masakazu Yamamoto, Koichi Muraoka	Team: City Office Takikawa, Popeyes ( Hokkaido); Takuji Takami, Kazunori Takeya, Masayuki Mori, Fumitaka Nagase, Hiroyuki Koyachi
5	1988	Team: City Office Takikawa, Popeyes ( Hokkaido); Fumitaka Nagase, Masayuki Mori, Takuji Takami, Akira Shimizu, Keiji Hayami	Team: Hyouentai ( Tokyo); Toru Jian, Hiroyuki Mori, Atsushi Kikuchi, Tetsuya Adachi	Team: Nagoya JC Hack ( Aichi); Michio Yamaguchi, Shigeo Mizuno, Kazumi Kobayashi, Tetsuyuki Tanemura, Hiroyoshi Mizuno
6	1989	Team: Iwakeshu Atoms ( Hokkaido); Shigenori Sato, Fukuhiro Imabashi, Shigeo Nasu, Toshio Yano, Shinji Miura	Team: City Office Takikawa, Popeyes ( Hokkaido); Akira Shimizu, Takuji Takami, Masayuki Mori, Fumitaka Nagase, Masanori Baba	Team: City Office Shibetsu, Muteking Jr. ( Hokkaido); Toshiaki Nakamine, Yasuhiro Hatanaka, Kazuhiro Houmura, Koji Toki, Akihiko Sasaki
7	1990	Team: Iwakeshu Atoms ( Hokkaido); Shigenori Sato, Fukuhiro Imabashi, Toshio Yano, Shigeo Nasu, Kazunori Kuze	Team: Blue Gale ( Hokkaido); Atsushi Nasu, Yoshiaki Hori, Ryoji Onodera, Satoshi Eda, Masamichi Mukai	Team: Red Pajamas ( Hokkaido); Katsuo Hara, Satoru Asakawa, Kazuyuki Man, Yutaka Matsuura, Hiroshi Ishizawa
8	1991	Team: Miracle Takers ( Hokkaido); Yuichi Kimura, Masahiro Takeuchi, Sadao Sasaki, Naoki Haramaki, Yoshihiro Yamanaka	Team: Wings ( Hokkaido); Noriyasu Haneishi, Kazunori Kuze, Hisayuki Moriwaki, Yuji Fukao	Team: Iwakeshu Atoms ( Hokkaido); Shigenori Sato, Fukuhiro Imabashi, Toshio Yano, Hidenori Ando, Shuuichi Tabuchi
9	1992	Team: Iwakeshu Atoms (Hokkaido); Fukuhiro Imabashi, Toshio Yano, Yoshiyuki Ohmiya, Takahiro Sekine, Shigenori Sato	Team: Muteking Jr. (Hokkaido); Hirofumi Kudo, Kazuhiro Houmura, Toshiaki Nakamine, Hiroshi Chuko, Hidekazu Yotsuji	Team: Blue Gale (Hokkaido); Yoshiaki Hori, Atsushi Nasu, Ryoji Onodera, Satoshi Eda, Shinji Miura
10	1993	Team: Iwakeshu Atoms ( Hokkaido); Fukuhiro Imabashi, Toshio Yano, Yoshiyuki Ohmiya, Takahiro Sekine, Shigenori Sato	Unknown	Unknown
11	1994	Team: Iwakeshu Atoms ( Hokkaido); Fukuhiro Imabashi, Toshio Yano, Yoshiyuki Ohmiya, Takahiro Sekine, Shigenori Sato	Unknown	Unknown
12	1995	Team: Miracle Takers ( Hokkaido); Yuichi Kimura, Masahiro Takeuchi, Yoshihiro Yamanaka, Sadao Sasaki, Yuki Takano	Unknown	Unknown
13	1996	Team: Iceman ( Hokkaido); Hiroshi Sato, Makoto Tsuruga, Shinya Abe, Kazuhito Hori, Yusuke Hirosawa	Unknown	Unknown
14	1997	Team: Olympic team (All Japan); Hirofumi Kudo, Makoto Tsuruga, Hiroshi Sato, Yoshiyuki Ohmiya, Toshiaki Nakamine	Team: Karuizawa Granit ( Nagano); Yoshikazu Uchida, Hideaki Nagaoka, Tadashi Fujimaki, Tamotsu Matsumura, Hidetaka Sunaga	Team: Iceman ( Hokkaido); Shinya Abe, Koji Tsuruga, Kunhito Hori, Yusuke Hirosawa, Naoki Kudo
15	1998	Team: Olympic team (All Japan); Makoto Tsuruga, Hiroshi Sato, Yoshiyuki Ohmiya, Hirofumi Kudo, Toshiaki Nakamine	Team: ZEARTH ( Nagano); Nagao Tsuchiya, Hideki Ogihara, Katsuji Uchibori, Yuki Inoue, Tamotsu Matsumura	Team: Seaside Curling Club ( Hokkaido); Kazuhiko Tabusa, Minoru Nakajima, Kazuhito Hori, Yusuke Hirosawa, Shinya Abe
16	1999	Team: Japan national team Hirofumi Kudo, Makoto Tsuruga, Hiroshi Sato, Yoshiyuki Ohmiya, Toshiaki Nakamine	Team: VICTORY ( Nagano); Hiroaki Kashiwagi, Jun Nakayama, Kazuto Yanagizawa, Keita Yanagizawa, Takanori Ichimura	Team: Super bloom ( Hokkaido); Shigenori Suzuki, Nariyuki Matsudaira, Naoki Kudo, Tetsuyuki Marumoto
17	2000	Team: VICTORIOUS ( Nagano); Hiroaki Kashiwagi, Kazuto Yanagizawa, Takanori Ichimura, Keita Yanagizawa, Yuki Inoue	Team: Japan national team Makoto Tsuruga, Hiroshi Sato, Kazuhito Hori, Naoki Kudo, Shinya Abe	Team: ETOILE ( Hokkaido); Hiroshi Tsuruga, Kogo Shiga, Yoshiyuki Ohmiya, Hirotoshi Yamaguchi, Shuichiro Omote
18	2001	Team: VICTORIOUS ( Nagano); Hiroaki Kashiwagi, Kazuto Yanagizawa, Jun Nakayama, Keita Yanagizawa, Takanori Ichimura	Team: ETOILE ( Hokkaido); Hiroshi Tsuruga, Yuki Hayashi, Hirotoshi Yamaguchi, Shuichiro Omote, Atsushi Nasu	Team: MAX ( Hokkaido); Hirofumi Kobayashi, Kogo Shiga, Yuki Sawamukai, Naoyuki Miyashita, Ryoji Onodera
19	2002	Team: VICTORIOUS ( Nagano); Hiroaki Kashiwagi, Kazuto Yanagizawa, Jun Nakayama, Keita Yanagizawa, Takanori Ichimura	Team: MAX ( Hokkaido); Hirofumi Kobayashi, Yuki Sawamukai, Naoyuki Miyashita, Ryoji Onodera, Atsushi Nasu	Team: ETOILE ( Hokkaido); Hiroshi Tsuruga, Kazuhito Hori, Yuki Hayashi, Hirotoshi Yamaguchi, Kogo Shiga
20	2003	Team: VICTORIOUS ( Nagano); Hiroaki Kashiwagi, Kazuto Yanagizawa, Jun Nakayama, Keita Yanagizawa, Takanori Ichimura	Team: Donkoro Bears ( Hokkaido); Tsuyoshi Yamaguchi, Tomiyasu Goshima, Yoshishige Meguro, Yuta Kato, Yukihiro Murakami	Team: Seaside Curling Club ( Hokkaido); Shinya Abe, Kazuhiko Tabusa, Shinji Miura, Kunhito Hori, Hirotoshi Yamaguchi
21	2004	Team: Super Mariners ( Hokkaido); Yoshiyuki Ohmiya, Makoto Tsuruga, Kazuhiko Ikawa, Yuji Hirama, Kosuke Aisaka	Team: VICTORIOUS ( Nagano); Hiroaki Kashiwagi, Kazuto Yanagizawa, Jun Nakayama, Takanori Ichimura	Team: GAFFER ( Aomori Prefecture); Shinya Abe, Kunhito Hori, Kazuto Yanagizawa, Tsuyoshi Yamaguchi
22	2005	Team: Team Ohmiya ( Hokkaido); Yoshiyuki Ohmiya, Makoto Tsuruga, Kazuhiko Ikawa, Yuji Hirama, Tsuyoshi Ryutaki	Team: Team Kashiwagi ( Nagano); Hiroaki Kashiwagi, Jun Nakayama, Takanori Ichimura, Keita Satoh	Team: Karuizawa Junior ( Nagano); Ryo Ogihara, Tetsuro Shimizu, Yuki Sakamoto, Hayato Sato, Yuta Matsumura
23	2006	Team: Team Asama ( Nagano); Miki Maysubara, Keita Satoh, Jun Nakayama, Hiroaki Kashiwagi, Yuki Sakamoto	Team: SC Karuizawa Club ( Nagano); Kosuke Morozumi, Tetsuro Shimizu, Tsuyoshi Yamaguchi, Yusuke Morozumi, Yoichi Nakasato	Team: Tokoro Association ( Hokkaido); Kazuhiko Ikawa, Tsuyoshi Ryutaki, Yuki Sawamukai, Makoto Tsuruga, Yuji Hirama
24	2007	Team: SC Karuizawa Club ( Nagano); Yusuke Morozumi, Tsuyoshi Yamaguchi, Tetsuro Shimizu, Masanori Sato, Kosuke Morozumi	Team: Team Asama ( Nagano); Hiroaki Kashiwagi, Yuki Sakamoto, Takanori Ichimura, Yoichi Nakasato	Team: Tokoro Association ( Hokkaido); Makoto Tsuruga, Tsuyoshi Ryutaki, Kazuhiko Ikawa, Yusaku Shibaya, Yuki Sawamukai
25	2008	Team: SC Karuizawa Club ( Nagano); Yusuke Morozumi, Tsuyoshi Yamaguchi, Tetsuro Shimizu, Kosuke Morozumi	Team: Tokyo University ( Tokyo); Naoki Iwanaga, Shinichiro Ishihara, Jumpei Kanda, Shota Iino, Ryo Ogihara	Team: Tokoro Association ( Hokkaido); Makoto Tsuruga, Yuki Sawamukai, Tsuyoshi Ryutaki, Tsubasa Sato, Yusaku Shibaya
26	2009	Team: SC Karuizawa Club (Nagano); Yusuke Morozumi, Tsuyoshi Yamaguchi, Tetsuro Shimizu, Kosuke Morozumi	Team: Nagano CA (Nagano); Ryo Ogihara, Yasuo Mochida, Takeshi Kano, Hayato Sato, Keita Satoh	Team: Team Tokoro (Hokkaido); Makoto Tsuruga, Yuki Sawamukai, Yusaku Shibaya, Ryosuke Haneishi, Ryoji Onodera
27	2010	Team: Team Tokoro (Hokkaido); Makoto Tsuruga, Yuki Sawamukai, Yusaku Shibaya, Ryosuke Haneishi, Ryuya Ishigaki	Team: SC Karuizawa Club (Nagano); Yusuke Morozumi, Tsuyoshi Yamaguchi, Tetsuro Shimizu, Kosuke Morozumi	Team: All Kitami (Hokkaido); Hiroshi Tsuruga, Koichiro Takada, Yuuki Hayashi, Yuji Kobayashi, Go Wakabayashi
28	2011	Team: Team Tokoro (Hokkaido); Makoto Tsuruga, Yuki Sawamukai, Yusaku Shibaya, Ryosuke Haneishi, Taichi Teramachi	Team: City Office Shibetsu (Hokkaido); Akihiro Yabunaka, Hisaaki Nakamine, Hirofumi Kudo, Hidekazu Yotsuji, Kazuhito Houmura	Team: Karuizawa C.C. (Nagano); Yuta Matsumura, Keita Satoh, Yoshiro Shimizu, Yuki Sakamoto, Yuto Sato
29	2012	Team: Team Kitami (Hokkaido); Makoto Tsuruga, Yuki Sawamukai, Yusaku Shibaya, Ryosuke Haneishi, Taichi Teramachi	Team: SC Karuizawa Club (Nagano); Yusuke Morozumi, Tsuyoshi Yamaguchi, Tetsuro Shimizu, Kosuke Morozumi	Team: Kitami Association (Hokkaido); Hiroshi Tsuruga, Yuuki Hayashi, Go Wakabayashi, Shigeki Takahashi, Takuroh Mukaihira
30	2013	Team: SC Karuizawa Club (Nagano); Yusuke Morozumi, Tsuyoshi Yamaguchi, Tetsuro Shimizu, Kosuke Morozumi, Yoshiro Shimizu	Team: Team Kitami (Hokkaido); Makoto Tsuruga, Yuki Sawamukai, Yusaku Shibaya, Ryosuke Haneishi, Taichi Teramachi	Team: Sapporo (Hokkaido); Shinya Abe, Hiroshi Sato, Naomasa Takeda, Yuta Matsumura
31	2014	Team: SC Karuizawa Club (Nagano); Yusuke Morozumi, Tsuyoshi Yamaguchi, Tetsuro Shimizu, Kosuke Morozumi	Team: Team Tokyo (Tokyo); Naoki Iwanaga, Junpei Kanda, Shota Iino, Shotaro Hashimoto, Shinya Iwamoto	Team: Team Obihiro (Hokkaido); Yoshihiro Sakaguchi, Fukuhiro Ohno, Masayuki Fujii, Kou Tanaka, Ryou Kawanishi
32	2015	Team: SC Karuizawa Club; Team: Yusuke Morozumi, Tsuyoshi Yamaguchi, Tetsuro Shimizu, Kosuke Morozumi; Association: Nagano	Team: Sapporo; Team: Shinya Abe, Yuta Matsumura, Yuki Hayashi, Hiroshi Sato; Association: Hokkaido	Team: Kitami Institute of Technology; Team: Kouji Tsuruga, Yuki Sawamukai, Yusaku Shibatani, Ryosuke Haneishi; Association: Hokkaido
33	2016	Team: SC Karuizawa Club; Team: Yusuke Morozumi, Tsuyoshi Yamaguchi, Tetsuro Shimizu, Kosuke Morozumi; Association: Nagano	Team: Team Tokyo; Team: Junpei Kanda, Naoki Iwanaga, Shota Iino, Shotaro Hashimoto; Association: Tokyo	Team: Sapporo; Team: Shinya Abe, Yuta Matsumura, Yuki Hayashi, Hiroshi Sato; Association: Hokkaido
34	2017	Team: SC Karuizawa Club; Team: Yusuke Morozumi, Tetsuro Shimizu, Tsuyoshi Yamaguchi, Kosuke Morozumi; Association: Nagano	Team: Sapporo; Team: Shinya Abe, Yuta Matsumura, Yuki Hayashi, Hiroshi Sato; Association: Hokkaido	Team: Team Kitami; Team: Yuki Sawamukai, Yusaku Shibaya, Taiga Saito, Ryosuke Haneishi; Association: Hokkaido
35	2018	Team: Team Iwai; Team: Go Aoki, Masaki Iwai (skip), Ryotaro Shukuya, Yutaka Aoyama; Association: Hokkaido	Team: Team Hokkaido; Team: Yuta Matsumura, Yasumasa Tanida, Shinya Abe (skip), Kosuke Aita; Association: Hokkaido	Team: Karuizawa CC; Team: Yoshiro Shimizu, Yuki Sakamoto, Riku Yanagisawa, Hayato Sato; Association: Nagano
36	2019	Team: Consadole; Team: Yuta Matsumura, Tetsuro Shimizu, Yasumasa Tanida, Shinya Abe; Association: Hokkaido	Team: Team Tokyo; Team: Junpei Kanda, Kosuke Morozumi, Shinya Iwamoto, Shotaro Hashimoto; Association: Tokyo	Team: Sapporo International University; Team: Go Aoki, Masaki Iwai (skip), Ryotaro Shukuya, Kouki Ogiwara; Association: Hokkaido
37	2020	Team: Consadole; Team: Yuta Matsumura, Tetsuro Shimizu, Yasumasa Tanida, Shinya Abe; Association: Hokkaido	Team: TM Karuizawa; Team: Yusuke Morozumi, Masaki Iwai, Ryotaro Shukuya, Kosuke Morozumi; Association: Nagano	Team: SC Karuizawa Club; Team: Tsuyoshi Yamaguchi, Riku Yanagisawa, Satoshi Koizumi, Fukuhiro Ohno; Association: Nagano
38	2021	Team: Consadole; Team: Yuta Matsumura, Tetsuro Shimizu, Yasumasa Tanida, Shinya Abe, Kosuke Aita; Association: Hokkaido	Team: Tokoro Junior; Team: Takumi Maeda, Uryu Kamilkawa, Hiroki Maeda, Asei Nakahara; Association: Hokkaido	Team: TM Karuizawa; Team: Yusuke Morozumi, Masaki Iwai, Ryotaro Shukuya, Kosuke Morozumi; Association: Nagano
39	2022	Team: SC Karuizawa Club; Team: Riku Yanagisawa, Tsuyoshi Yamaguchi, Takeru Yamamoto, Satoshi Koizumi; Association: Nagano	Team: Sapporo International University; Team: Go Aoki, Hayato Sato, Kouki Ogiwara, Kazushi Nino, Kei Kamada; Association: Hokkaido	Team: Consadole; Team: Yasumasa Tanida, Tetsuro Shimizu, Kosuke Aita, Shinya Abe; Association: Hokkaido
40	2023	Team: SC Karuizawa Club; Team: Riku Yanagisawa, Tsuyoshi Yamaguchi, Takeru Yamamoto, Satoshi Koizumi; Association: Nagano	Team: Kitami Association; Team: Kohsuke Hirata, Shingo Usui, Ryota Meguro, Kosuke Aita, Yoshiya Miura; Association: Hokkaido	Team: Consadole; Team: Tetsuro Shimizu (Fourth), Haruto Ouchi, Shinya Abe (Skip), Sota Tsuruga, Minori Suzuki; Association: Hokkaido
41	2024	Team: Consadole; Team: Tetsuro Shimizu (Fourth), Shinya Abe (Skip), Haruto Ouchi, Sota Tsuruga, Makoto Tsuruga; Association: Hokkaido	Team: SC Karuizawa Club; Team: Riku Yanagisawa, Tsuyoshi Yamaguchi, Takeru Yamamoto, Satoshi Koizumi; Association: (Nagano Prefecture) Nagano	Team: Loco Solare; Team: Takumi Maeda, Asei Nakahara, Hiroki Maeda, Uryu Kamikawa, Ryoji Onodera; Association: Hokkaido
42	2025	Team: SC Karuizawa Club; Team: Riku Yanagisawa, Tsuyoshi Yamaguchi, Takeru Yamamoto, Satoshi Koizumi; Association: (Nagano Prefecture) Nagano	Team: Loco Solare; Team: Takumi Maeda, Asei Nakahara, Hiroki Maeda, Uryu Kamikawa, Toa Nakahara; Association: Hokkaido	Team: Consadole; Team: Tetsuro Shimizu (Fourth), Shinya Abe (Skip), Hayato Sato, Haruto Ouchi, Sota Tsuruga; Association: Hokkaido
43	2026	Team: SC Karuizawa Club; Team: Riku Yanagisawa (Fourth), Tsuyoshi Yamaguchi (Skip), Takeru Yamamoto, Satoshi Koizumi, Yasumasa Tanida; Association: (Nagano Prefecture) Nagano	Team: Loco Solare; Team: Takumi Maeda, Hiroki Maeda, Uryu Kamikawa, Gakuto Tokoro, Ryotaro Shukuya; Association: Hokkaido	Team: SC Karuizawa Club Jr. Team: Kaito Fujii, Miki Yamamoto, Kounosuke Takahashi, Shunsuke Kanagawa, Ruki Yokoyama; Association: (Nagano Prefecture) Nagano

=== Women ===
Edition	Year	Winners	Runner-up	3rd
1	1984	—N/a; Women's event was not available.		
2	1985	—N/a; Women's event was not available.		
3	1986	—N/a; Women's event was not available.		
4	1987	—N/a; Women's event was not available.		
5	1988	Team: Big Bonanza ( Hokkaido); Sayo Asakawa, Atsuko Asakawa, Setsuko Hara, Keiko Kamogawa, Masako Matsuura	Team: Tohkoh Pavement Ladies ( Hokkaido); Sanae Ozaki, Utage Matsuzaki, Tomoko Yokoyama, Masumi Yoshikawa, Mayumi Seguchi	Team: Aomori Curling Club ( Aomori); Yuko Minowada, Katsuyo Namiuchi, Yasuko Kimura, Ikuko Shukunobe, Kazuko Tsushima
6	1989	Team: Kawanishi Construction Women ( Hokkaido); Minori Kudo, Kaoru Tatesaki, Etsuko Ito, Mayumi Abe, Mayumi Kaneko	Team: Parsons ( Hokkaido); Ayako Ishigaki, Tomie Yoshida, Yoko Mimura, Keiko Nakata, Yuri Kamada	Team: Big Bonanza ( Hokkaido); Keiko Kamogawa, Setsuko Hara, Sayo Asakawa, Kumiko Ito
7	1990	Team: Silver Mate ( Hokkaido); Misako Hayashi, Takako Fujisawa, Kimiko Otomo, Etsuko Kaneda, Fumiko Nakadai	Team: Tokyo Ladies ( Tokyo); Shigeko Sato, Noriko Kaneuchi, Rie Kobayashi, Kazuko Ueno, Mieko Nagashima	Team: Kawanishi Construction Women ( Hokkaido); Minori Kudo, Mayumi Abe, Etsuko Ito, Kaoru Tatesaki, Mayumi Seguchi
8	1991	Team: Tohkoh Pavement Ladies ( Hokkaido); Mayumi Seguchi, Utage Matsuzaki, Rumi Michida, Hidemi Itai, Yukari Mabuchi	Team: Silver Mate ( Hokkaido); Misako Hayashi, Kimiko Otomo, Takako Fujisawa, Fusako Okada, Saeko Ohe	Team: Kawanishi Construction Women ( Hokkaido); Minori Kudo, Mayumi Abe, Chieko Horishimizu, Mayumi Kaneko
8	1991	Team: Tohkoh Pavement Ladies ( Hokkaido); Mayumi Seguchi, Utage Matsuzaki, Rumi Michida, Hidemi Itai, Yukari Mabuchi	Team: Silver Mate ( Hokkaido); Misako Hayashi, Kimiko Otomo, Takako Fujisawa, Fusako Okada, Saeko Ohe	Team: Parsons ( Hokkaido); Ayako Ishigaki, Yoko Mimura, Yukiko Nakajima, Yukari Kondo, Keiko Nakata
9	1992	Team: Tohkoh Pavement Ladies (Hokkaido); Mayumi Seguchi, Minori Kudo, Mayumi Abe, Utage Matsuzaki, Rumi Michida	Team: Tokyo Marine (Tokyo); Naomi Kawano, Kazuko Ueno, Chris Takayama, Tokiko Igarashi, Yumi Unno	Team: Kawanishi Construction Women (Hokkaido); Chieko Horishimizu, Akemi Niwa, Miki Ishikawa, Mayumi Kaneko
10	1993	Team: Tohkoh Pavement Ladies ( Hokkaido); Mayumi Seguchi, Mayumi Abe, Hidemi Itai, Miyuki Nonomura	Unknown	Unknown
11	1994	Team: Parsons ( Hokkaido); Ayako Ishigaki, Yoko Mimura, Yukari Kondo, Emi Fujita, Kimiko Uchida	Unknown	Unknown
12	1995	Team: Parsons ( Hokkaido); Ayako Ishigaki, Yoko Mimura, Yukari Kondo, Emi Fujita, Kimiko Uchida	Unknown	Unknown
13	1996	Team: Team Ishigaki (All Japan selection); Ayako Ishigaki, Mayumi Okutsu, Yukari Kondo, Yoko Mimura	Unknown	Unknown
14	1997	Team: Olympic team (All Japan); Mayumi Okutsu, Akiko Katoh, Yukari Kondo, Yoko Mimura, Akemi Niwa	Team: Simsons ( Hokkaido); Yumie Hayashi, Ayumi Onodera, Mika Konaka, Ai Kobayashi	Team: Tom Collins ( Nagano); Ayako Uchibori, Reiko Sato, Hatomi Nagaoka, Mika Yoda, Shiho Tsuchiya
15	1998	Team: Olympic team (All Japan); Mayumi Okutsu, Akiko Katoh, Yukari Kondo, Yoko Mimura, Akemi Niwa	Team: Simsons ( Hokkaido); Yumie Hayashi, Ayumi Onodera, Mika Hori, Ai Kobayashi, Naomi Kobayashi	Team: Pic Tic ( Nagano); Yukako Tsuchiya, Yuka Kobayashi, Mika Yoda, Tomoko Sonobe, Junko Sonobe
16	1999	Team: Japan national team Akiko Katoh, Yumie Hayashi, Akemi Niwa, Ayumi Onodera, Mika Hori	Team: Kawanishi Construction Women ( Hokkaido); Miki Ishikawa, Emi Fujiwara, Eriko Minatoya, Mayumi Kaneko, Shinobu Aota	Team: Super Lovers ( Hokkaido); Ai Kobayashi, Megumi Mabuchi, Akiko Yamazaki, Natsuki Yoshida, Yukie Nasu
17	2000	Team: Kawanishi Construction Women ( Hokkaido); Eriko Minatoya, Shinobu Aota, Emi Fujiwara, Yukari Okazaki, Kotomi Ishizaki	Team: Japan national team Akiko Katoh, Yumie Hayashi, Ayumi Onodera, Mika Hori	Team: Maplies ( Kanagawa); Andrea Smith, Shiho Kobayashi, Sachiyo Kobayashi, Misako Ichiba, Tomoko Kato
18	2001	Team: Simsons ( Hokkaido); Akiko Katoh, Yumie Hayashi, Ayumi Onodera, Mika Konaka	Team: Kawanishi Construction Women ( Hokkaido); Yukari Okazaki, Emi Fujiwara, Shinobu Aota, Yukari Okazaki, Kotomi Ishizaki	Team: Happy ( Tokyo); Naomi Kawano, Satoe Kato, Hiroko Ueda, Kaori Hashizume, Kaoru Matsuyama
19	2002	Team: Pocket ( Hokkaido); Yoko Mimura, Yukari Kondo, Tomie Yoshida, Sueko Shibaya, Sanae Horiguchi	Team: Kawanishi Construction Women ( Hokkaido); Shinobu Aota, Yukari Okazaki, Eriko Minatoya, Kotomi Ishizaki, Satomi Tsujii	Team: Simsons ( Hokkaido); Akiko Katoh, Yumie Hayashi, Ayumi Onodera, Mika Konaka
20	2003	Team: Kawanishi Construction Women ( Hokkaido); Shinobu Aota, Yukari Okazaki, Eriko Minatoya, Kotomi Ishizaki, Satomi Tsujii	Team: Pic.Tic ( Nagano); Yukako Tsuchiya, Junko Sonobe, Tomoko Sonobe, Chiemi Kameyama, Mitsuki Sato	Team: Ringo Stars ( Aomori); Ayumi Onodera, Yumie Hayashi, Madoka Sawada, Yuduko Sawada
21	2004	Team: FORTIUS ( Aomori); Moe Meguro, Yumie Hayashi, Ayumi Onodera, Sakurako Terada	Team: Lovers ( Hokkaido); Ai Kobayashi, Akiko Yamazaki, Megumi Kobayashi, Natsuki Yoshida, Megumi Mabuchi	Team: Kawanishi Construction Women ( Hokkaido); Shinobu Aota, Yukari Okazaki, Eriko Minatoya, Kotomi Ishizaki, Mari Motohashi
22	2005	Team: Team Tsuchiya ( Nagano); Yukako Tsuchiya, Junko Sonobe, Tomoko Sonobe, Chiemi Kameyama, Mitsuki Sato	Team: Team Aomori Association ( Aomori); Ayumi Onodera, Yumie Hayashi, Mari Motohashi, Sakurako Terada, Moe Meguro	Team: Team Matsumura ( Nagano); Nagisa Matsumura, Hatomi Nagaoka, Reiko Sato, Shizuka Date
23	2006	Team: Team Aomori ( Aomori); Ayumi Onodera, Yumie Hayashi, Mari Motohashi, Moe Meguro, Sakurako Terada	Team: Team Nagano ( Nagano); Yukako Tsuchiya, Junko Sonobe, Tomoko Sonobe, Chiemi Kameyama, Mitsuki Sato	Team: Tokoro Junior High School ( Hokkaido); Chinami Yoshida, Tomona Nakagawa, Kaho Onodera, Yumi Suzuki, Mayu Ogasawara
24	2007	Team: Team Aomori ( Aomori); Moe Meguro, Mari Motohashi, Mayo Yamaura, Sakurako Terada, Asuka Yogo	Team: Team Nagano ( Nagano); Yukako Tsuchiya, Junko Sonobe, Tomoko Sonobe, Mitsuki Sato, Miyuki Sato	Team: Tokoro Junior High School ( Hokkaido); Chinami Yoshida, Kaho Onodera, Yurika Yoshida, Yumi Suzuki
25	2008	Team: Team Aomori ( Aomori); Moe Meguro, Mari Motohashi, Mayo Yamaura, Kotomi Ishizaki, Anna Ohmiya	Team: Team Nagano ( Nagano); Yukako Tsuchiya, Junko Sonobe, Tomoko Sonobe, Mitsuki Sato, Miyuki Sato	Team: Team Tokoro ( Hokkaido); Sayaka Yoshimura, Rina Ida, Risa Ujihara, Mao Ishigaki
26	2009	Team: Team Aomori (Aomori); Moe Meguro, Mari Motohashi, Mayo Yamaura, Kotomi Ishizaki, Anna Ohmiya	Team: Tokoro High School (Hokkaido); Megumi Mabuchi, Natsuki Yoshida, Kiiko Kawaguchi, Akane Eda, Megumi Tabusa	Team: Karuizawa (Nagano); Ayane Matsumura, Yuko Hishida, Emi Shimizu, Masumi Maruyama, Yuriko Yosiike
27	2010	Team: Team Aomori (Aomori); Moe Meguro, Anna Ohmiya, Mari Motohashi, Kotomi Ishizaki, Mayo Yamaura	Team: Tokoro High School (Hokkaido); Sayaka Yoshimura, Rina Ida, Risa Ujihara, Mao Ishigaki	Team: Chubu Electric Power (Nagano); Satsuki Fujisawa, Miyo Ichikawa, Emi Shimizu, Miyuki Satoh
28	2011	Team: Chubu Electric Power (Nagano); Satsuki Fujisawa, Miyo Ichikawa, Emi Shimizu, Miyuki Satoh, Kai Tsuchiya	Team: Team Aomori (Aomori); Shinobu Aota, Mayo Yamaura, Anna Ohmiya, Kotomi Ishizaki	Team: LS Kitami (Hokkaido); Mari Motohashi, Yurika Yoshida, Megumi Mabuchi, Akane Eda, Yumi Suzuki
29	2012	Team: Chubu Electric Power (Nagano); Satsuki Fujisawa, Miyo Ichikawa, Emi Shimizu, Miyuki Satoh, Chiaki Matsumura	Team: LS Kitami (Hokkaido); Mari Motohashi, Yurika Yoshida, Yumi Suzuki, Megumi Mabuchi, Akane Eda	Team: Team Aomori (Aomori); Shinobu Aota, Mayo Yamaura, Anna Ohmiya, Kotomi Ishizaki, Jyueri Sakurada
30	2013	Team: Chubu Electric Power (Nagano); Satsuki Fujisawa, Miyo Ichikawa, Emi Shimizu, Chiaki Matsumura, Miyuki Satoh	Team: Hokkaido Bank (Hokkaido); Ayumi Ogasawara, Yumie Funayama, Kaho Onodera, Chinami Yoshida, Michiko Tomabechi	Team: Sapporo International University (Hokkaido); Sayaka Yoshimura, Rina Ida, Risa Ujihara, Mao Ishigaki, Natsuko Ishiyama
31	2014	Satsuki Fujisawa, Miyo Ichikawa, Chiaki Matsumura, Emi Shimizu; Association: Nagano	Ayumi Ogasawara, Yumie Funayama, Kaho Onodera, Michiko Tomabechi; Association: Hokkaido	Mari Motohashi, Yurika Yoshida, Megumi Mabuchi, Yumi Suzuki; Association: Hokkaido
32	2015	Team: Hokkaido Bank; Team: Ayumi Ogasawara, Sayaka Yoshimura, Kaho Onodera, Anna Ohmiya; Association: Hokkaido	Team: LS Kitami; Team: Mari Motohashi, Chinami Yoshida, Yumi Suzuki, Yurika Yoshida; Association: Hokkaido	Team: Fujiyama; Team: Junko Nishimuro, Tori Koana, Misato Yanagisawa, Riko Toyoda; Association: Yamanashi
33	2016	Team: LS Kitami; Team: Satsuki Fujisawa, Mari Motohashi, Chinami Yoshida, Yumi Suzuki; Association: Hokkaido	Team: Fujikyu; Team: Junko Nishimuro, Misato Yanagisawa, Tori Koana, Riko Toyoda; Association: Yamanashi	Team: Hokkaido Bank; Team: Ayumi Ogasawara, Sayaka Yoshimura, Kaho Onodera, Anna Ohmiya; Association: Hokkaido
34	2017	Team: Chubu Electric Power; Team: Chiaki Matsumura, Emi Shimizu, Ikue Kitazawa, Hasumi Ishigooka; Association: Nagano	Team: LS Kitami; Team: Satsuki Fujisawa, Chinami Yoshida, Yumi Suzuki, Yurika Yoshida; Association: Hokkaido	Team: Fujikyu; Team: Junko Nishimuro, Tori Koana, Yuna Kotani, Mao Ishigaki; Association: Yamanashi
35	2018	Team: Fujikyu; Team: Tori Koana, Yuna Kotani, Mao Ishigaki, Arisa Kotani, Junko Nishimuro; Association: Yamanashi	Team: Hokkaido Bank; Team: Ayumi Ogasawara, Kaho Onodera, Anna Ohmiya, Yumie Funayama, Sayaka Yoshimura; Association: Hokkaido	Team: Chubu Electric Power; Team: Chiaki Matsumura, Ikue Kitazawa, Seina Nakajima, Hasumi Ishigooka, Emi Shimizu; Association: Nagano
36	2019	Team: Chubu Electric Power; Team: Ikue Kitazawa, Chiaki Matsumura, Seina Nakajima, Hasumi Ishigooka, Emi Shimizu; Association: Nagano	Team: Loco Solare; Team: Satsuki Fujisawa, Chinami Yoshida, Yumi Suzuki, Yurika Yoshida; Association: Hokkaido	Team: Hokkaido Bank; Team: Sayaka Yoshimura, Kaho Onodera, Anna Ohmiya, Yumie Funayama; Association: Hokkaido
37	2020	Team: Loco Solare; Team: Satsuki Fujisawa, Chinami Yoshida, Yumi Suzuki, Yurika Yoshida; Association: Hokkaido	Team: Chubu Electric Power; Team: Ikue Kitazawa, Chiaki Matsumura, Seina Nakajima, Hasumi Ishigooka, Emi Shimizu; Association: Nagano	Team: Hokkaido Bank; Team: Sayaka Yoshimura, Kaho Onodera, Anna Ohmiya, Yumie Funayama; Association: Hokkaido
38	2021	Team: Hokkaido Bank; Team: Sayaka Yoshimura, Kaho Onodera, Anna Ohmiya, Yumie Funayama, Ayami Ito; Association: Hokkaido	Team: Loco Solare; Team: Satsuki Fujisawa, Chinami Yoshida, Yumi Suzuki, Yurika Yoshida, Kotomi Ishizaki; Association: Hokkaido	Team: Chubu Electric Power; Team: Ikue Kitazawa, Chiaki Matsumura, Seina Nakajima, Hasumi Ishigooka, Minori Suzuki; Association: Nagano
39	2022	Team: Loco Solare; Team: Satsuki Fujisawa, Chinami Yoshida, Yumi Suzuki, Yurika Yoshida, Kotomi Ishizaki; Association: Hokkaido	Team: Chubu Electric Power; Team: Ikue Kitazawa, Seina Nakajima, Minori Suzuki, Hasumi Ishigooka, Chiaki Matsumura; Association: Nagano	Team: Hokkaido Bank; Team: Momoha Tabata, Miku Nihira, Mikoto Nakajima, Ayami Ito; Association: Hokkaido
40	2023	Team: Loco Solare; Team: Satsuki Fujisawa, Chinami Yoshida, Yumi Suzuki, Yurika Yoshida, Kotomi Ishizaki; Association: Hokkaido	Team: SC Karuizawa Club; Team: Asuka Kanai, Ami Enami, Junko Nishimuro, Mone Ryokawa, Miyu Ueno; Association: Nagano	Team: Chubu Electric Power; Team: Ikue Kitazawa, Seina Nakajima, Minori Suzuki, Hasumi Ishigooka, Chiaki Matsumura; Association: Nagano
41	2024	Team: SC Karuizawa Club; Team: Miyu Ueno, Asuka Kanai, Junko Nishimuro, Yui Ueno, Mone Ryokawa; Association: (Nagano Prefecture) Nagano	Team: Hokkaido Bank; Team: Momoha Tabata (Fourth), Miku Nihira (Skip), Sae Yamamoto, Mikoto Nakajima, Ayami Ito; Association: Hokkaido	Team: Chubu Electric Power; Team: Ikue Kitazawa, Seina Nakajima, Ami Enami, Minori Suzuki, Hasumi Ishigooka; Association: (Nagano Prefecture) Nagano
42	2025	Team: Fortius; Team: Sayaka Yoshimura, Kaho Onodera, Yuna Kotani, Anna Ohmiya, Mina Kobayashi; Association: Hokkaido	Team: Hokkaido Bank; Team: Momoha Tabata (Fourth), Miku Nihira (Skip), Sae Yamamoto, Mikoto Nakajima, Ayami Ito; Association: Hokkaido	Team: Loco Solare; Team: Satsuki Fujisawa, Chinami Yoshida, Yumi Suzuki, Yurika Yoshida, Yako Matsuzawa; Association: Hokkaido
43	2026	Team: SC Karuizawa Club; Team: Miyu Ueno, Yui Ueno, Asuka Kanai, Ai Kawata, Mayo Koyanagi; Association: (Nagano Prefecture) Nagano	Team: Hokkaido Bank; Team: Miku Nihira, Momoha Tabata, Sae Yamamoto, Mikoto Nakajima; Association: Hokkaido	Team: Fortius; Team: Sayaka Yoshimura, Kaho Onodera, Yuna Kotani, Anna Ohmiya, Mina Kobayashi; Association: Hokkaido

== See also ==
- Japan Mixed Doubles Curling Championship
