= Mika Konaka =

Japanese curler

- Curler ♀
- Born: Mika Hori; February 24, 1977 (age 49); Tokoro, Hokkaido, Japan

Team
- Curling club: Obihiro CC, Obihiro & Tokoro CC

Curling career
- Member Association: Japan
- World Championship: 2 (1999, 2001)
- Pacific-Asia Championship: 2 (1998, 2001)
- Olympic: 1 (2002)
- Other appearances: World Junior Championships: 4 (1994, 1995, 1997, 1999)
Medal record
Curling
Pacific-Asia Championships
Gold medal – first place	1998 Qualicum Beach
Silver medal – second place	2001 Jeonju
Japan Women's Championship
Gold medal – first place	1999 Tokoro
Gold medal – first place	2001 Tokoro
Silver medal – second place	1997 Karuizawa
Silver medal – second place	1998 Tokoro
Silver medal – second place	2000 Karuizawa
World Junior Championships
Silver medal – second place	1998 Thunder Bay

Mika Konaka (Japanese: 小仲 美香; born February 24, 1977, in Tokoro, Hokkaido, Japan as Mika Hori) is a Japanese curler, a 1998 Pacific-Asian champion and a two-time Japan women's champion (1999, 2001).

She played for Japan at the 2002 Winter Olympics, where the Japanese team finished in eighth place.

== Teams ==
Season	Skip	Third	Second	Lead	Alternate	Coach	Events
1993–94	Hitomi Suzuki	Mika Hori	Fumiko Hirosawa	Kozue Hasegawa	Yumiko Abe		WJCC 1994 (9th)
1994–95	Mika Hori	Hitomi Suzuki	Fumiko Hirosawa	Kozue Hasegawa	Akiko Katoh		WJCC 1995 (7th)
1996–97	Akiko Katoh	Yumie Hayashi	Ayumi Onodera	Mika Hori	Ai Kobayashi		WJCC 1997 (5th)
1996–97	Yumie Hayashi	Ayumi Onodera	Mika Hori	Ai Kobayashi			JWCC 1997 (silver)
1997–98	Akiko Katoh	Yumie Hayashi	Ayumi Onodera	Mika Hori	Ai Kobayashi		WJCC 1998 (silver)
1997–98	Yumie Hayashi	Ayumi Onodera	Mika Hori	Ai Kobayashi	Naomi Kobayashi		JWCC 1998 (silver)
1998–99	Akiko Katoh	Yumie Hayashi	Ayumi Onodera	Mika Hori	Akemi Niwa	Elaine Dagg-Jackson	PCC 1998 (gold)
1998–99	Akiko Katoh	Yumie Hayashi	Akemi Niwa	Ayumi Onodera	Mika Hori		JWCC 1999 (gold)
1998–99	Akiko Katoh	Akemi Niwa	Ayumi Onodera	Mika Hori	Yumie Hayashi	Elaine Dagg-Jackson	WCC 1999 (9th)
1999–00	Akiko Katoh	Yumie Hayashi	Ayumi Onodera	Mika Hori			JWCC 2000 (silver)
2000–01	Akiko Katoh	Yumie Hayashi	Ayumi Onodera	Mika Konaka	Yukari Okazaki (WCC)	Yoshiyuki Ohmiya	JWCC 2001 (gold); WCC 2001 (7th)
2001–02	Akiko Katoh	Yumie Hayashi	Ayumi Onodera	Mika Konaka	Kotomi Ishizaki	Yoshiyuki Ohmiya	PCC 2001 (silver); WOG 2002 (8th)
