= Yuki Inoue (curler) =

Japanese male curler

- Curler ♂

Team
- Curling club: Miyota CC, Nagano

Curling career
- Member Association: Japan
- World Championship: 1 (2000)
- Other appearances: World Junior Championships: 1 (2000)
Medal record
Curling
Japan Curling Championship
Gold medal – first place	2000 Karuizawa
Silver medal – second place	1998 Tokoro

Yuki Inoue (井上 祐樹, Inoue Yuki) is a Japanese male curler.

At the national level, he is a 2000 Japan men's champion.

== Teams ==
Season	Skip	Third	Second	Lead	Alternate	Coach	Events
1997–98	Nagao Tsuchiya	Hideki Ogihara	Katsuji Uchibori	Yuki Inoue	Tamotsu Matsumura		JMCC 1998 (silver)
1999–00	Hiroaki Kashiwagi	Kazuto Yanagizawa	Takanori Ichimura	Keita Yanagizawa	Yuki Inoue	Akinori Kashiwagi, Kazuyuki Tsuchiya (WJCC)	WJCC 2000 (5th); WCC 2000 (10th)
