= Hiroshi Sato =

Hiroshi Sato may refer to:

- Hiroshi Sato (musician) (佐藤 博, 1947–2012), Japanese singer-songwriter
- Hiroshi Sato (curler) (佐藤 浩, born 1978), Japanese curler and curling coach
- Hiroshi Sato, fictional character from The Legend of Korra
