= Keita Satoh (curler) =

Japanese male curler

- Curler ♂

Team
- Curling club: Karuizawa CC, Karuizawa

Curling career
- Member Association: Japan
- World Championship: 1 (2009)
- Pacific-Asia Championship: 1 (2004)
- Other appearances: World Junior Championships: 1 (2003), Pacific-Asia Junior Championships: 2 (2008, 2010)
Medal record
Curling
Pacific Championships
| Bronze medal – third place | 2004 Chuncheon |
Japan Curling Championship
| Gold medal – first place | 2006 Karuizawa |
| Silver medal – second place | 2005 Karuizawa |
| Silver medal – second place | 2009 Аомори |
Pacific-Asia Junior Championships
| Silver medal – second place | 2008 Jeonju City |
| Silver medal – second place | 2010 Nayoro |

Keita Satoh (佐藤 恵大, Satō Keita) is a Japanese male curler.

At the international level, he is a 2004 Pacific bronze medallist.

At the national level, he is a 2006 Japan men's champion curler.

== Teams ==
| Season | Skip | Third | Second | Lead | Alternate | Coach | Events |
|---|---|---|---|---|---|---|---|
| 2002–03 | Hiroaki Kashiwagi | Kazuto Yanagizawa | Yoichi Nakasato | Yusuke Morozumi | Keita Satoh | Akinori Kashiwagi | WJCC 2003 (6th) |
| 2004–05 | Hiroaki Kashiwagi | Jun Nakayama | Keita Yanagizawa | Takanori Ichimura | Keita Satoh | Akinori Kashiwagi, Keith Reilly | PCC 2004 (bronze) |
| 2004–05 | Hiroaki Kashiwagi | Jun Nakayama | Takanori Ichimura | Keita Satoh | | | JMCC 2005 (silver) |
| 2005–06 | Miki Maysubara | Keita Satoh | Jun Nakayama | Hiroaki Kashiwagi | Yuki Sakamoto | | JMCC 2006 (gold) |
| 2007–08 | Yuki Sakamoto | Yuta Matsumura | Ryo Ogihara | Hayato Sato | Keita Satoh | Tamotsu Matsumura | PJCC 2008 (silver) |
| 2008–09 | Ryo Ogihara | Yasuo Mochida | Takeshi Kano | Hayato Sato | Keita Satoh | | JMCC 2009 (silver) |
| 2008–09 | Yusuke Morozumi | Tsuyoshi Yamaguchi | Tetsuro Shimizu | Kosuke Morozumi | Keita Satoh | Hatomi Nagaoka | WCC 2009 (10th) |
| 2009–10 | Yuta Matsumura | Keita Satoh | Yoshiro Shimizu | Hiroaki Ogawa | Yusaku Shibaya | | PJCC 2010 (silver) |
| 2010–11 | Nagao Tsuchiya | Yoshiike Yamato | Keita Satoh | Yuichi Kajiwara | Motoaki Kimoto | | |
