= Kazuto Yanagizawa =

Japanese male curler

- Curler ♂
- Born: December 15, 1981

Team
- Curling club: Miyota CC, Nagano

Curling career
- Member Association: Japan
- World Championship: 2 (2000, 2002)
- Pacific-Asia Championship: 3 (2000, 2001, 2002)
- Other appearances: World Junior Championships: 5 (1997, 1999, 2000, 2001, 2003), Asian Winter Games: 1 (2003)
Medal record
Curling
Pacific Championships
| Gold medal – first place | 2001 Jeonju |
| Bronze medal – third place | 2000 Esquimalt |
| Bronze medal – third place | 2002 Queenstown |
Asian Winter Games
| Silver medal – second place | 2003 Aomori |
Japan Curling Championship
| Gold medal – first place | 2000 Karuizawa |
| Gold medal – first place | 2001 Tokoro |
| Gold medal – first place | 2002 Tokoro |
| Gold medal – first place | 2003 Karuizawa |
| Silver medal – second place | 1999 Tokoro |
| Silver medal – second place | 2004 Moseushi |

Kazuto Yanagizawa (柳沢 和人, Yanagizawa Kazuto; born December 15, 1981) is a Japanese male curler.

At the international level, he is a 2001 Pacific champion curler, a two-time Pacific bronze medallist (2000, 2002) and a two-time 2003 Asian Winter Games silver medallist.

At the national level, he is a four-time Japan men's champion curler (2000, 2001, 2002, 2003).

== Teams ==
| Season | Skip | Third | Second | Lead | Alternate | Coach | Events |
|---|---|---|---|---|---|---|---|
| 1996–97 | Makoto Tsuruga | Hiroaki Kashiwagi | Jun Nakayama | Kazuto Yanagizawa | Keita Yanagizawa | | WJCC 1997 (4th) |
| 1998–99 | Hiroaki Kashiwagi | Jun Nakayama | Kazuto Yanagizawa | Keita Yanagizawa | Takanori Ichimura | Glen Jackson | WJCC 1999 (7th) |
| 1999–00 | Hiroaki Kashiwagi | Kazuto Yanagizawa | Takanori Ichimura | Keita Yanagizawa | Yuki Inoue | Akinori Kashiwagi, Kazuyuki Tsuchiya (WJCC) | WJCC 2000 (5th); WCC 2000 (10th) |
| 2000–01 | Hiroaki Kashiwagi | Kazuto Yanagizawa | Takanori Ichimura | Keita Yanagizawa | Jun Nakayama | | PCC 2000 (bronze) |
| 2000–01 | Hiroaki Kashiwagi | Kazuto Yanagizawa | Jun Nakayama | Keita Yanagizawa | Yusuke Morozumi | Akinori Kashiwagi | WJCC 2001 (6th) |
| 2001–02 | Hiroaki Kashiwagi | Kazuto Yanagizawa | Jun Nakayama | Keita Yanagizawa | Takanori Ichimura | Akinori Kashiwagi (WCC) | PCC 2001 (gold); WCC 2002 (9th) |
| 2002–03 | Hiroaki Kashiwagi | Kazuto Yanagizawa | Jun Nakayama | Keita Yanagizawa | Takanori Ichimura | Akinori Kashiwagi | PCC 2002 (bronze) |
| 2002–03 | Hiroaki Kashiwagi | Kazuto Yanagizawa | Yoichi Nakasato | Yusuke Morozumi | Keita Satoh | Akinori Kashiwagi | WJCC 2003 (6th) |
| 2002–03 | Hiroaki Kashiwagi | Keita Yanagizawa | Jun Nakayama | Kazuto Yanagizawa | Takanori Ichimura | | AWG 2003 (silver) |
