= Kazuhiko Ikawa =

Japanese male curler

- Curler ♂
- Born: December 18, 1982 (age 43); Tokoro, Hokkaido, Japan

Team
- Curling club: Tokoro CC, Tokoro

Curling career
- Member Association: Japan
- World Championship: 1 (2006)
- Pacific-Asia Championship: 1 (2005)
Medal record
Curling
Pacific Championships
Silver medal – second place	2005 Taipei
Japan Men's Championship
Gold medal – first place	2004
Bronze medal – third place	2007 Tokoro

Kazuhiko Ikawa (井川 和彦, Ikawa Kazuhiko; born December 18, 1982 in Tokoro, Hokkaido) is a Japanese male curler.

At the international level, he is a 2005 Pacific silver medallist.

At the national level, he is a 2004 Japan men's champion curler.

== Teams ==
Season	Skip	Third	Second	Lead	Alternate	Coach	Events
2003–04	Yoshiyuki Ohmiya	Makoto Tsuruga	Kazuhiko Ikawa	Yuji Hirama			JMCC 2004 (gold)
2005–06	Yoshiyuki Ohmiya	Makoto Tsuruga	Kazuhiko Ikawa	Yuji Hirama	Tsuyoshi Ryutaki	Wayne Matthewson	PCC 2005 (silver)
2005–06	Yoshiyuki Ohmiya	Makoto Tsuruga	Tsuyoshi Ryutaki	Kazuhiko Ikawa	Yuji Hirama	Wayne Matthewson	WCC 2006 (11th)
2006–07	Makoto Tsuruga	Tsuyoshi Ryutaki	Kazuhiko Ikawa	Yusaku Shibaya			JMCC 2007 (bronze)
