= 2012 Pacific-Asia Junior Curling Championships =

- Host city: Jeonju City, South Korea
- Arena: Jeonju Hwasan Ice Rink
- Dates: January 27–February 2
- Men's winner: China
- Skip: Ma Xiuyue
- Third: Xiao Shicheng
- Second: Jiang Dongxu
- Lead: Shao Zhilin
- Alternate: Zhang Zhongbao
- Finalist: South Korea (Kim Jeong-min)
- Women's winner: Japan
- Skip: Sayaka Yoshimura
- Third: Rina Ida
- Second: Risa Ujihara
- Lead: Mao Ishigaki
- Alternate: Natsuo Ishiyama
- Finalist: South Korea (Kim Eun-jung)

The 2012 Pacific-Asia Junior Curling Championships were held from January 27 to February 2 in Jeonju City, South Korea. The Pacific Junior Championships acted as the Pacific Zone qualifiers for the 2012 World Junior Curling Championships. The teams competed in a double round robin, and the top three teams moved on to the playoffs. The winners of the tournament, China's junior men and Japan's junior women, will compete at the 2012 World Junior Championships in Östersund, Sweden.

== Men ==
=== Teams ===
The teams are listed as follows:

Country	Skip	Third	Second	Lead	Alternate
Australia	Angus Young	Dean Hewitt	Max Thomas	Sam Williams	Grant Hamsey
China	Ma Xiuyue	Xiao Shicheng	Jiang Dongxu	Shao Zhilin	Zhang Zhongbao
Japan	Yusaku Shibaya	Yuji Kobayashi	Tomoya Ogawa	Tomoya Yamazaki	Takuroh Mukaihira
South Korea	Kim Jeong-min	Jang Jin-yeong	Kim San	Seo Min-guk	Kim Woorammiroo
New Zealand	Sam Miller	Michael Smith	Willie Miller	Liam Dowling	

=== Round-robin standings ===
Final round-robin standings

Country	Skip	W	L
South Korea	Kim Jeong-min	7	1
Japan	Yusaku Shibaya	6	2
China	Ma Xiuyue	5	3
New Zealand	Sam Miller	2	6
Australia	Angus Young	0	8

=== Round-robin results ===
All times are listed in Korea Standard Time (UTC+9).

==== Draw 1 ====
Saturday, January 28, 10:00

Sheet A	1	2	3	4	5	6	7	8	9	10	Final
Japan (Shibaya)	1	0	0	0	0	2	1	0	0	1	5
New Zealand (Miller) 🔨	0	0	0	2	2	0	0	2	0	0	4

Sheet B	1	2	3	4	5	6	7	8	9	10	Final
China (Ma)	0	1	0	0	1	0	2	5	X	X	9
Australia (Young) 🔨	1	0	1	0	0	1	0	0	X	X	3

==== Draw 2 ====
Saturday, January 28, 16:00

Sheet C	1	2	3	4	5	6	7	8	9	10	Final
Australia (Young)	0	0	0	1	0	0	X	X	X	X	1
Japan (Shibaya) 🔨	2	1	1	0	3	2	X	X	X	X	9

Sheet D	1	2	3	4	5	6	7	8	9	10	Final
South Korea (Kim)	0	0	0	0	0	4	0	0	1	X	5
China (Ma) 🔨	0	0	0	0	2	0	0	0	0	X	2

==== Draw 3 ====
Sunday, January 29, 10:00

Sheet A	1	2	3	4	5	6	7	8	9	10	Final
South Korea (Kim)	0	1	0	1	0	1	0	2	0	3	8
Australia (Young) 🔨	2	0	1	0	1	0	2	0	1	0	7

Sheet C	1	2	3	4	5	6	7	8	9	10	Final
China (Ma)	2	1	0	1	0	1	1	0	X	X	6
New Zealand (Miller) 🔨	0	0	1	0	1	0	0	1	X	X	3

==== Draw 4 ====
Sunday, January 29, 16:00

Sheet B	1	2	3	4	5	6	7	8	9	10	Final
Japan (Shibaya)	0	2	0	0	0	0	0	0	X	X	2
South Korea (Kim) 🔨	1	0	1	0	1	1	1	2	X	X	7

Sheet D	1	2	3	4	5	6	7	8	9	10	Final
New Zealand (Miller)	0	1	6	1	2	X	X	X	X	X	10
Australia (Young) 🔨	1	0	0	0	0	X	X	X	X	X	1

==== Draw 5 ====
Monday, January 30, 10:00

Sheet A	1	2	3	4	5	6	7	8	9	10	Final
New Zealand (Miller)	0	0	1	0	0	2	0	1	0	X	4
South Korea (Kim) 🔨	0	2	0	2	0	0	1	0	2	X	7

Sheet C	1	2	3	4	5	6	7	8	9	10	Final
Japan (Shibaya)	0	0	2	0	2	2	0	0	3	X	9
China (Ma) 🔨	1	0	0	3	0	0	2	0	0	X	6

==== Draw 6 ====
Monday, January 30, 16:00

Sheet A	1	2	3	4	5	6	7	8	9	10	Final
Australia (Young)	1	0	0	0	2	0	1	0	X	X	4
China (Ma) 🔨	0	1	0	2	0	2	0	5	X	X	10

Sheet B	1	2	3	4	5	6	7	8	9	10	Final
New Zealand (Miller)	0	3	0	1	0	1	0	3	0	0	8
Japan (Shibaya) 🔨	1	0	1	0	1	0	2	0	2	2	9

==== Draw 7 ====
Tuesday, January 31, 10:00

Sheet B	1	2	3	4	5	6	7	8	9	10	Final
South Korea (Kim) 🔨	0	0	2	0	0	0	2	0	0	X	4
China (Ma)	1	1	0	2	0	0	0	3	0	X	7

Sheet D	1	2	3	4	5	6	7	8	9	10	Final
Australia (Young) 🔨	0	0	0	1	0	1	0	0	X	X	2
Japan (Shibaya)	1	1	0	0	3	0	2	1	X	X	8

==== Draw 8 ====
Tuesday, January 31, 16:00

Sheet C	1	2	3	4	5	6	7	8	9	10	Final
South Korea (Kim) 🔨	0	2	0	0	1	0	5	2	X	X	10
Australia (Young)	0	0	1	0	0	2	0	0	X	X	3

Sheet D	1	2	3	4	5	6	7	8	9	10	Final
China (Ma) 🔨	2	2	0	4	2	0	X	X	X	X	10
New Zealand (Miller)	0	0	2	0	0	2	X	X	X	X	4

==== Draw 9 ====
Wednesday, February 1, 10:00

Sheet B	1	2	3	4	5	6	7	8	9	10	Final
Australia (Young)	0	0	0	1	0	2	0	X	X	X	3
New Zealand (Miller) 🔨	2	0	1	0	5	0	3	X	X	X	11

Sheet D	1	2	3	4	5	6	7	8	9	10	Final
Japan (Shibaya) 🔨	1	0	0	0	0	2	0	X	X	X	3
South Korea (Kim)	0	1	2	3	2	0	1	X	X	X	9

==== Draw 10 ====
Wednesday, February 1, 16:00

Sheet A	1	2	3	4	5	6	7	8	9	10	Final
China (Ma)	1	1	0	2	0	1	0	2	0	0	7
Japan (Shibaya) 🔨	0	0	2	0	2	0	3	0	0	2	9

Sheet C	1	2	3	4	5	6	7	8	9	10	Final
New Zealand (Miller) 🔨	0	0	0	0	0	1	0	0	0	X	1
South Korea (Kim)	0	1	0	0	1	0	0	1	2	X	5

=== Playoffs ===
Semifinal			Final
			1	South Korea	2
2	Japan	4	3	China	3
3	China	7

==== Semifinal ====
Thursday, February 2, 9:00

Team	1	2	3	4	5	6	7	8	9	10	Final
Japan (Shibaya) 🔨	1	0	0	0	1	0	0	0	2	X	4
China (Ma)	0	2	1	1	0	0	0	3	0	X	7

==== Final ====
Thursday, February 2, 14:30

Team	1	2	3	4	5	6	7	8	9	10	Final
South Korea (Kim) 🔨	1	0	0	0	0	0	1	0	0	0	2
China (Ma)	0	0	0	0	1	1	0	0	0	1	3

== Women ==
=== Teams ===
The teams are listed as follows:

Country	Skip	Third	Second	Lead	Alternate
Australia	Victoria Wilson	Marlene Corgat-Taylor	Shantelle Walker	Tahli Gill	
China	Jiang Yilun	She Qiutong	Wang Rui	Yao Mingyue	Mei Jie
Japan	Sayaka Yoshimura	Rina Ida	Risa Ujihara	Mao Ishigaki	Natsuo Ishiyama
South Korea	Kim Eun-jung	Kim Kyeong-ae	Kim Seon-yeong	Kim Yeong-mi	Kim Ji-hyeon
New Zealand	Chelsea Farley	Thivya Jeyaranjan	Tessa Farley	Kelsi Heath	Eleanor Adviento

=== Round-robin standings ===
Final round-robin standings

Country	Skip	W	L
China	Jiang Yilun	6	2
South Korea	Kim Eun-jung	6	2
Japan	Sayaka Yoshimura	6	2
New Zealand	Chelsea Farley	2	6
Australia	Victoria Wilson	0	8

=== Round-robin results ===
All times are listed in Korea Standard Time (UTC+9).

==== Draw 1 ====
Saturday, January 28, 10:00

Sheet C	1	2	3	4	5	6	7	8	9	10	Final
New Zealand (Farley)	0	0	1	0	0	0	2	1	0	X	4
China (Jiang) 🔨	0	3	0	0	2	2	0	0	2	X	9

Sheet C	1	2	3	4	5	6	7	8	9	10	Final
Australia (Young)	0	0	0	0	0	0	X	X	X	X	0
Japan (Shibaya) 🔨	4	2	2	3	1	2	X	X	X	X	14

==== Draw 2 ====
Saturday, January 28, 16:00

Sheet A	1	2	3	4	5	6	7	8	9	10	Final
South Korea (Kim)	1	0	2	0	1	2	1	3	X	X	10
New Zealand (Farley) 🔨	0	1	0	1	0	0	0	0	X	X	2

Sheet B	1	2	3	4	5	6	7	8	9	10	Final
China (Jiang)	5	2	3	1	1	0	1	X	X	X	13
Australia (Wilson) 🔨	0	0	0	0	0	1	0	X	X	X	1

==== Draw 3 ====
Sunday, January 29, 10:00

Sheet B	1	2	3	4	5	6	7	8	9	10	Final
New Zealand (Farley)	1	0	0	0	0	0	1	X	X	X	2
Japan (Yoshimura) 🔨	0	1	3	3	1	0	0	X	X	X	8

Sheet D	1	2	3	4	5	6	7	8	9	10	Final
South Korea (Kim)	0	0	0	0	0	1	0	2	1	X	4
China (Jiang) 🔨	0	0	3	0	2	0	2	0	0	X	7

==== Draw 4 ====
Sunday, January 29, 16:00

Sheet A	1	2	3	4	5	6	7	8	9	10	Final
Japan (Yoshimura)	0	2	0	0	0	1	0	2	0	X	5
China (Jiang) 🔨	1	0	1	2	2	0	2	0	1	X	9

Sheet C	1	2	3	4	5	6	7	8	9	10	Final
Australia (Wilson)	0	0	0	0	0	0	X	X	X	X	0
South Korea (Kim) 🔨	4	2	2	3	2	1	X	X	X	X	14

==== Draw 5 ====
Monday, January 30, 10:00

Sheet B	1	2	3	4	5	6	7	8	9	10	Final
Australia (Wilson)	0	2	0	0	0	0	X	X	X	X	2
New Zealand (Farley) 🔨	3	0	4	2	3	3	X	X	X	X	15

Sheet D	1	2	3	4	5	6	7	8	9	10	Final
Japan (Yoshimura)	0	0	0	1	0	2	0	0	2	X	5
South Korea (Kim) 🔨	1	1	1	0	1	0	0	3	0	X	7

==== Draw 6 ====
Monday, January 30, 16:00

Sheet C	1	2	3	4	5	6	7	8	9	10	Final
Japan (Yoshimura)	3	0	2	0	6	2	1	X	X	X	14
Australia (Wilson) 🔨	0	2	0	1	0	0	0	X	X	X	3

Sheet D	1	2	3	4	5	6	7	8	9	10	Final
China (Jiang)	1	0	1	3	0	3	0	2	X	X	10
New Zealand (Farley) 🔨	0	0	0	0	1	0	3	0	X	X	4

==== Draw 7 ====
Tuesday, January 31, 10:00

Sheet A	1	2	3	4	5	6	7	8	9	10	Final
China (Jiang) 🔨	4	1	0	1	0	0	4	2	X	X	12
Australia (Wilson)	0	0	1	0	1	1	0	0	X	X	3

Sheet C	1	2	3	4	5	6	7	8	9	10	Final
South Korea (Kim) 🔨	0	1	0	3	2	1	1	X	X	X	8
New Zealand (Farley)	0	0	1	0	0	0	0	X	X	X	1

==== Draw 8 ====
Tuesday, January 31, 16:00

Sheet A	1	2	3	4	5	6	7	8	9	10	Final
New Zealand (Farley) 🔨	1	0	3	0	1	0	0	1	0	X	6
Japan (Yoshimura)	0	2	0	3	0	2	1	0	1	X	9

Sheet B	1	2	3	4	5	6	7	8	9	10	Final
South Korea (Kim) 🔨	0	2	1	0	0	2	0	2	0	X	7
China (Jiang)	0	0	0	0	1	0	2	0	1	X	4

==== Draw 9 ====
Wednesday, February 1, 10:00

Sheet A	1	2	3	4	5	6	7	8	9	10	Final
Australia (Wilson) 🔨	0	1	0	0	0	2	0	X	X	X	3
South Korea (Kim)	1	0	2	4	1	0	6	X	X	X	14

Sheet C	1	2	3	4	5	6	7	8	9	10	Final
China (Jiang)	0	1	0	2	0	0	2	0	2	X	7
Japan (Yoshimura) 🔨	2	0	1	0	0	2	0	3	0	X	8

==== Draw 10 ====
Wednesday, February 1, 16:00

Sheet B	1	2	3	4	5	6	7	8	9	10	Final
Japan (Yoshimura) 🔨	0	0	1	0	0	0	0	1	2	0	4
South Korea (Kim)	0	0	0	1	0	0	0	0	0	1	2

Sheet D	1	2	3	4	5	6	7	8	9	10	Final
New Zealand (Farley)	0	2	1	3	3	0	5	X	X	X	14
Australia (Wilson) 🔨	1	0	0	0	0	1	0	X	X	X	2

=== Playoffs ===
Semifinal			Final
			1	Japan	3
2	China	3	3	South Korea	2
3	South Korea	4

==== Semifinal ====
Thursday, February 2, 9:00

Sheet D	1	2	3	4	5	6	7	8	9	10	Final
China (Jiang)	0	0	0	0	1	0	0	1	1	X	3
South Korea (Kim) 🔨	0	0	2	0	0	0	2	0	0	X	4

==== Final ====
Thursday, February 2, 14:30

Team	1	2	3	4	5	6	7	8	9	10	Final
Japan (Yoshimura)	0	0	0	1	0	0	0	0	1	1	3
South Korea (Kim) 🔨	0	1	0	0	0	0	0	1	0	0	2
