= 1996 Pacific Curling Championships =

- Host city: Sydney, Australia
- Dates: November 26–29
- Men's winner: Australia
- Curling club: Sydney Harbour CC, Sydney
- Skip: Hugh Millikin
- Third: Gerald Chick
- Second: Stephen Johns
- Lead: Stephen Hewitt
- Finalist: Japan (Hiroshi Sato)
- Women's winner: Japan
- Skip: Mayumi Ohkutsu
- Third: Akiko Katoh
- Second: Yukari Kondo
- Lead: Yoko Mimura
- Alternate: Akemi Niwa
- Finalist: Australia (Lynn Hewitt)

The 1996 Pacific Curling Championships were held from November 26 to 29 in Sydney, Australia.

Australia won the men's event over Japan (it was the sixth Pacific title for the Australian men). On the women's side, Japan defeated Australia in the final (it was the fifth Pacific title for the Japanese women).

By virtue of winning, the Australian men's team and the Japanese women's team qualified for the 1997 World Men's and Women's Curling Championships in Bern, Switzerland.

It was the first appearance at the Pacific championships for the men's and women's teams of South Korea.

== Men ==
=== Teams ===
Country	Skip	Third	Second	Lead	Alternate	Coach	Curling club
Australia	Hugh Millikin	Gerald Chick	Stephen Johns	Stephen Hewitt			Sydney Harbour CC, Sydney
Japan	Hiroshi Sato	Makoto Tsuruga	Kazuhito Hori	Shinya Abe	Hirohumi Kudo		
South Korea	Park Kwon-il	Song He-dong	Lee Jac-in	Kim Chang-gyu			
New Zealand	Peter Becker	Sean Becker	Jim Allan	Ross A. Stevens	Lorne De Pape	Edwin Harley	

=== Round Robin ===
Place	Country	Skip	(Australia)	(Japan)	(New Zealand)	(South Korea)	Wins	Losses
1	Australia	Hugh Millikin	*	9:8; 3:6	14:0; 7:4	31:2; 13:1	5	1
2	Japan	Hiroshi Sato	8:9; 6:3	*	9:6; 11:3	13:1; 15:7	5	1
3	New Zealand	Peter Becker	0:14; 4:7	6:9; 3:11	*	20:1; 14:7	2	4
4	South Korea	Park Kwon-il	2:31; 1:13	1:13; 7:15	1:20; 7:14	*	0	6

Teams to playoffs

=== Playoffs ===
Semifinal		Final
		Australia	7
Japan	8	Japan	4
New Zealand	4

Semifinal

Team	1	2	3	4	5	6	7	8	9	10	Final
Japan (Hiroshi Sato) 🔨	2	1	0	2	0	0	2	0	1	X	8
New Zealand (Peter Becker)	0	0	2	0	2	0	0	0	0	X	4

Final

Team	1	2	3	4	5	6	7	8	9	10	Final
Japan (Hiroshi Sato)	0	0	0	0	0	2	0	2	0	X	4
Australia (Hugh Millikin) 🔨	0	1	1	2	1	0	1	0	1	X	7

=== Final standings ===
Place	Country	Skip	GP	W	L
1st place, gold medalist(s)	Australia	Hugh Millikin	7	6	1
2nd place, silver medalist(s)	Japan	Hiroshi Sato	8	6	2
3rd place, bronze medalist(s)	New Zealand	Peter Becker	7	2	5
4	South Korea	Park Kwon-il	6	0	6

== Women ==
=== Teams ===
Country	Skip	Third	Second	Lead	Alternate	Curling club
Australia	Lynn Hewitt	Linda Carter-Watts	Ellen Weir	Lyn Greenwood	Christine Traquair	Victoria Curling Association
Japan	Mayumi Ohkutsu	Akiko Katoh	Yukari Kondo	Yoko Mimura	Akemi Niwa	
South Korea	Lee So-jung	Lee Hyun-jung	Lee Im-sum	Lim Jung-min		
New Zealand	Patsy Inder	Helen Greer	Wendy Becker	Kylie Petherick	Karen Rawcliffe	

=== Round Robin ===
Place	Country	Skip	(Japan)	(Australia)	(New Zealand)	(South Korea)	Wins	Losses
1	Japan	Mayumi Ohkutsu	*	W:L; W:L	- -	- -	?	?
2	Australia	Lynn Hewitt	L:W; L:W	*	7:3; L:W	14:5; 15:4	3	3
2	New Zealand	Patsy Inder	- -	3:7; W:L	*	- -	3	3
4	South Korea	Lee So-jung	- -	5:14; 4:15	- -	*	?	?

Team to final
Teams to tie-break
"-" – no data about game result

=== Tie-break ===
Team	1	2	3	4	5	6	7	8	9	10	Final
Australia (Lynn Hewitt)											10
New Zealand (Patsy Inder)											7

=== Final ===
Team	1	2	3	4	5	6	7	8	9	10	Final
Australia (Lynn Hewitt)											L
Japan (Mayumi Ohkutsu)											W

=== Final standings ===
Place	Country	Skip	GP	W	L
1st place, gold medalist(s)	Japan	Mayumi Ohkutsu	7	?	?
2nd place, silver medalist(s)	Australia	Lynn Hewitt	8	4	4
3rd place, bronze medalist(s)	New Zealand	Patsy Inder	7	3	4
4	South Korea	Lee So-jung	6	?	?
