= 1997 Pacific Curling Championships =

- Host city: Karuizawa, Japan
- Arena: Karuizawa Kazakoshi Park Arena
- Dates: December 3–7
- Men's winner: Australia
- Curling club: Sydney Harbour CC, Sydney
- Skip: Hugh Millikin
- Third: John Theriault
- Second: Stephen Johns
- Lead: Trevor Schumm
- Finalist: Japan (Yoshiyuki Ohmiya)
- Women's winner: Japan
- Skip: Mayumi Ohkutsu
- Third: Akiko Katoh
- Second: Yukari Kondo
- Lead: Akemi Niwa
- Alternate: Yoko Mimura
- Finalist: New Zealand (Helen Greer)

The 1997 Pacific Curling Championships were held from December 3 to 7 at the Karuizawa Kazakoshi Park Arena in Karuizawa, Japan.

Australia won the men's event over Japan (it was the seventh Pacific title for the Australian men). On the women's side, Japan defeated New Zealand in the final (it was the sixth Pacific title for the Japanese women).

By virtue of winning, the Australian men's team and the Japanese women's team qualified for the 1998 World Men's and Women's Curling Championships in Kamloops, British Columbia, Canada.

== Men ==
=== Teams ===
Country	Skip	Third	Second	Lead	Alternate	Coach	Curling club
Australia	Hugh Millikin	John Theriault	Stephen Johns	Trevor Schumm			Sydney Harbour CC, Sydney
Japan	Yoshiyuki Ohmiya	Hirohumi Kudo	Hiroshi Sato	Makoto Tsuruga	Hisaaki Nakamine		
South Korea	Song He-dong	Lim Sung-min	Kang Il-jin	Kim Young-tae	Jun Sung-il	Kim Kyung-doo	
New Zealand	Sean Becker	Hans Frauenlob	Ross A. Stevens	Lorne De Pape	Darren Carson	Edwin Harley	

=== Round Robin ===
Place	Country	Skip	(Australia)	(Japan)	(New Zealand)	(South Korea)	Wins	Losses
1	Australia	Hugh Millikin	*	6:4; 6:5	13:2; 11:2	15:1; 13:3	6	0
2	Japan	Yoshiyuki Ohmiya	4:6; 5:6	*	7:5; 8:4	18:0; 12:3	4	2
3	New Zealand	Sean Becker	2:13; 2:11	5:7; 4:8	*	10:4; 10:3	2	4
4	South Korea	Song He-dong	1:15; 3:13	0:18; 3:12	4:10; 3:10	*	0	6

Teams to final

=== Final ===
Team	1	2	3	4	5	6	7	8	9	10	Final
Japan (Yoshiyuki Ohmiya)	0	0	1	1	0	1	0	1	0	X	4
Australia (Hugh Millikin) 🔨	2	1	0	0	2	0	1	0	4	X	10

=== Final standings ===
Place	Country	Skip	GP	W	L
1st place, gold medalist(s)	Australia	Hugh Millikin	7	7	0
2nd place, silver medalist(s)	Japan	Yoshiyuki Ohmiya	7	4	3
3rd place, bronze medalist(s)	New Zealand	Sean Becker	6	2	4
4	South Korea	Song He-dong	6	0	6

== Women ==
=== Teams ===
Country	Skip	Third	Second	Lead	Alternate
Japan	Mayumi Ohkutsu	Akiko Katoh	Yukari Kondo	Akemi Niwa	Yoko Mimura
South Korea	Lee Hyun-jung	Choi Yun-mi	Jang Ji-young	Park Sun-nam	Yoon Hye-kyung
New Zealand	Helen Greer	Lisa Gavreau	Patsy Inder	Kylie Petherick	Karen Rawcliffe

=== Round Robin ===
Place	Country	Skip	(Japan)	(New Zealand)	(South Korea)	Wins	Losses
1	Japan	Mayumi Ohkutsu	*	9:5; 12:1	21:1; 18:2	4	0
2	New Zealand	Helen Greer	5:9; 1:12	*	11:2; 8:2	2	2
3	South Korea	Lee Hyun-jung	1:21; 2:18	2:11; 2:8	*	0	4

Teams to final

=== Final ===
Team	1	2	3	4	5	6	7	8	9	10	Final
New Zealand (Helen Greer)	1	0	0	0	0	0	1	X	X	X	2
Japan (Mayumi Ohkutsu) 🔨	0	2	1	1	2	3	0	X	X	X	9

=== Final standings ===
Place	Country	Skip	GP	W	L
1st place, gold medalist(s)	Japan	Mayumi Ohkutsu	5	5	0
2nd place, silver medalist(s)	New Zealand	Helen Greer	5	2	3
3rd place, bronze medalist(s)	South Korea	Lee Hyun-jung	4	0	4
