= Akemi Niwa =

Japanese curler

- Curler ♀
- Born: March 24, 1973 (age 53); Kitami, Hokkaido, Japan

Team
- Curling club: Obihiro CC, Obihiro & Tokoro CC

Curling career
- Member Association: Japan
- World Championship: 5 (1993, 1994, 1997, 1998, 1999)
- Pacific-Asia Championship: 4 (1993, 1996, 1997, 1998)
- Olympic: 1 (1998)
Medal record
Curling
Pacific-Asia Championships
Gold medal – first place	1993 Adelaide
Gold medal – first place	1997 Karuizawa
Gold medal – first place	1998 Qualicum Beach
Japan Women's Championship
Gold medal – first place	1997 Karuizawa
Gold medal – first place	1998 Tokoro
Gold medal – first place	1999 Tokoro

Akemi Niwa (丹羽 明美, Niwa Akemi; born March 24, 1973 in Kitami, Hokkaido) is a Japanese curler, a three-time Pacific-Asian champion (1993, 1997, 1998) and a three-time Japan women's champion (1997, 1998, 1999).

She played for Japan at the 1998 Winter Olympics, where the Japanese team finished in fifth place.

== Teams ==
Season	Skip	Third	Second	Lead	Alternate	Coach	Events
1992–93	Mayumi Seguchi	Mayumi Abe	Hidemi Itai	Akemi Niwa	Naomi Kawano		WCC 1993 (6th)
1993–94	Mayumi Seguchi	Hidemi Itai	Akemi Niwa	Miyuki Nonomura	Mami Nishioka		PCC 1993 (gold)
1993–94	Mayumi Seguchi	Ayako Ishigaki	Akemi Niwa	Chieko Horishimizu	Mami Nishioka		WCC 1994 (10th)
1996–97	Mayumi Ohkutsu	Akiko Katoh	Yukari Kondo	Yoko Mimura	Akemi Niwa		PCC 1996 (gold); JWCC 1997 (gold); WCC 1997 (4th)
1997–98	Mayumi Ohkutsu	Akiko Katoh	Yukari Kondo	Akemi Niwa	Yoko Mimura		PCC 1997 (gold)
1997–98	Mayumi Ohkutsu	Akiko Katoh	Yukari Kondo	Yoko Mimura	Akemi Niwa	Elaine Dagg-Jackson	WOG 1998 (5th); JWCC 1998 (gold); WCC 1998 (8th)
1998–99	Akiko Katoh	Yumie Hayashi	Ayumi Onodera	Mika Hori	Akemi Niwa	Elaine Dagg-Jackson	PCC 1998 (gold)
1998–99	Akiko Katoh	Yumie Hayashi	Akemi Niwa	Ayumi Onodera	Mika Hori		JWCC 1999 (gold)
1998–99	Akiko Katoh	Akemi Niwa	Ayumi Onodera	Mika Hori	Yumie Hayashi	Elaine Dagg-Jackson	WCC 1999 (9th)
