= Ryosuke Haneishi =

Japanese male curler

- Curler ♂

Team
- Curling club: Kitami Curling Association, Kitami

Curling career
- Member Association: Japan
- World Championship: 1 (2010)
- Pacific-Asia Championship: 2 (2010, 2011)
Medal record
Curling
Japan Men's Championship
Gold medal – first place	2010 Kitami
Gold medal – first place	2011 Nayoro
Silver medal – second place	2009 Aomori
Silver medal – second place	2012 Aomori
Silver medal – second place	2013 Sapporo
Bronze medal – third place	2015 Tokoro
Bronze medal – third place	2017 Karuizawa

Ryosuke Haneishi (羽石 遼祐, Haneishi Ryōsuke) is a Japanese male curler.

At the national level, he is a two-time Japan men's champion curler (2010, 2011).

== Teams ==
Season	Skip	Third	Second	Lead	Alternate	Coach	Events
2008–09	Makoto Tsuruga	Yuki Sawamukai	Yusaku Shibaya	Ryosuke Haneishi	Ryoji Onodera		JMCC 2009 (silver)
2009–10	Makoto Tsuruga	Yuki Sawamukai	Yusaku Shibaya	Ryosuke Haneishi	Ryuya Ishigaki	Hitoshi Yanagi (WCC)	JMCC 2010 (gold); WCC 2010 (12th)
2010–11	Makoto Tsuruga	Yuki Sawamukai	Yusaku Shibaya	Ryosuke Haneishi	Taichi Teramachi	Tetsu Eda (PCC), Kenichi Sato (PCC)	PCC 2010 (6th); JMCC 2011 (gold)
2011–12	Makoto Tsuruga	Yuki Sawamukai	Yusaku Shibaya	Ryosuke Haneishi	Taichi Teramachi	Shinya Abe (PCC), Hitoshi Matsudaira (PCC)	PCC 2011 (6th); JMCC 2012 (silver)
2012–13	Makoto Tsuruga	Yuki Sawamukai	Yusaku Shibaya	Ryosuke Haneishi	Taichi Teramachi		JMCC 2013 (silver)
2013–14	Makoto Tsuruga	Yuki Sawamukai	Yusaku Shibaya	Ryosuke Haneishi	Taichi Teramachi		
2014–15	Kouji Tsuruga	Yuki Sawamukai	Yusaku Shibaya	Ryosuke Haneishi			JMCC 2015 (bronze)
2016–17	Yuki Sawamukai	Yusaku Shibaya	Taiga Saito	Ryosuke Haneishi			JMCC 2017 (bronze)
