= Yukari Kondo =

Japanese curler

- Curler ♀
- Born: August 17, 1967 (age 59); Memanbetsu, Hokkaido, Japan

Team
- Curling club: Obihiro CC, Obihiro & Tokoro CC

Curling career
- Member Association: Japan
- World Championship: 4 (1995, 1996, 1997, 1998)
- Pacific-Asia Championship: 4 (1994, 1995, 1996, 1997)
- Olympic: 1 (1998)
Medal record
Curling
Pacific-Asia Championships
Gold medal – first place	1994 Christchurch
Gold medal – first place	1995 Tokoro
Gold medal – first place	1996 Sydney
Gold medal – first place	1997 Karuizawa
Japan Women's Championship
Gold medal – first place	1994 Karuizawa
Gold medal – first place	1995 Karuizawa
Gold medal – first place	1996 Karuizawa
Gold medal – first place	1997 Karuizawa
Gold medal – first place	1998 Tokoro
Bronze medal – third place	1991 Tokoro

Yukari Kondo (Japanese: 近藤ゆかり; born August 17, 1967, in Memanbetsu, Hokkaido, Japan) is a Japanese curler, a four-time Pacific-Asian champion (1994, 1995, 1996, 1997) and a five-time Japan women's champion (1994, 1995, 1996, 1997, 1998).

She played for Japan at the 1998 Winter Olympics, where the Japanese team finished in fifth place.

== Teams ==
Season	Skip	Third	Second	Lead	Alternate	Coach	Events
1990–91	Ayako Ishigaki	Yoko Mimura	Yukiko Nakajima	Yukari Kondo	Keiko Nakata		JWCC 1991 (bronze)
1993–94	Ayako Ishigaki	Yoko Mimura	Yukari Kondo	Emi Fujita	Kimiko Uchida		JWCC 1994 (gold)
1994–95	Ayako Ishigaki	Yukari Kondo	Emi Fujita	Akiko Katoh	Ayumi Onodera	Tetsu Eda	PCC 1994 (gold)
1994–95	Ayako Ishigaki	Yoko Mimura	Yukari Kondo	Emi Fujita	Kimiko Uchida		JWCC 1995 (gold)
1994–95	Ayako Ishigaki	Emi Fujita	Yukari Kondo	Yoko Mimura	Mayumi Ohkutsu		WCC 1995 (9th)
1995–96	Ayako Ishigaki	Emi Arai	Yukari Kondo	Yoko Mimura	Mayumi Ohkutsu		PCC 1995 (gold)
1995–96	Ayako Ishigaki	Mayumi Ohkutsu	Yukari Kondo	Yoko Mimura	Akiko Katoh (WCC)		JWCC 1996 (gold); WCC 1996 (6th)
1996–97	Mayumi Ohkutsu	Akiko Katoh	Yukari Kondo	Yoko Mimura	Akemi Niwa		PCC 1996 (gold); JWCC 1997 (gold); WCC 1997 (4th)
1997–98	Mayumi Ohkutsu	Akiko Katoh	Yukari Kondo	Akemi Niwa	Yoko Mimura		PCC 1997 (gold)
1997–98	Mayumi Ohkutsu	Akiko Katoh	Yukari Kondo	Yoko Mimura	Akemi Niwa	Elaine Dagg-Jackson	WOG 1998 (5th); JWCC 1998 (gold); WCC 1998 (8th)
