= 1998 Pacific Curling Championships =

- Host city: Qualicum Beach, British Columbia, Canada
- Arena: Qualicum and District CC
- Dates: December 13–18
- Men's winner: New Zealand
- Curling club: Ranfurly CC
- Skip: Sean Becker
- Third: Hans Frauenlob
- Second: Jim Allan
- Lead: Lorne De Pape
- Alternate: Darren Carson
- Coach: Edwin Harley
- Finalist: Japan (Makoto Tsuruga)
- Women's winner: Japan
- Curling club: Tokoro CC
- Skip: Akiko Katoh
- Third: Yumie Hayashi
- Second: Ayumi Onodera
- Lead: Mika Hori
- Alternate: Akemi Niwa
- Coach: Elaine Dagg-Jackson
- Finalist: New Zealand (Lisa Anderson)

The 1998 Pacific Curling Championships were held from December 13 to 18 in Qualicum Beach, British Columbia, Canada.

New Zealand won the men's event over Japan (it was the first Pacific title for the New Zealand men). On the women's side, Japan defeated New Zealand in the final (it was the seventh Pacific title for the Japanese women).

By virtue of winning, the New Zealand men's team and the Japanese women's team qualified for the 1999 World Men's and Women's Curling Championships in Saint John, New Brunswick, Canada.

The event was originally to be played at a new curling facility in Dunedin, New Zealand, but construction delays forced the event to be held in Canada. The New Zealand Curling Association ran the event.

== Men ==
=== Teams ===
Country	Skip	Third	Second	Lead	Alternate	Coach	Curling club
Australia	Hugh Millikin	Stephen Johns	John Theriault	Gerald Chick			Sydney Harbour CC, Sydney
Japan	Makoto Tsuruga	Kazuhito Hori	Hiroshi Sato	Naoki Kudo	Yoshiyuki Ohmiya	Glen Jackson	Tokoro CC
South Korea	Song He-dong	Kim Chang-min	Park Jae-cheol	Kim Su-hong	Jeong Tac-yeon		Gyeong-buk CC
New Zealand	Sean Becker	Hans Frauenlob	Jim Allan	Lorne De Pape	Darren Carson	Edwin Harley	Ranfurly CC

=== Round Robin ===
Place	Country	Skip	(New Zealand)	(Australia)	(Japan)	(South Korea)	Wins	Losses
1	New Zealand	Sean Becker	*	9:7; 1:8	7:5; 7:1	13:3; 7:6	5	1
2	Australia	Hugh Millikin	7:9; 8:1	*	7:5; 4:7	23:5; 12:2	4	2
3	Japan	Makoto Tsuruga	5:7; 1:7	5:7; 7:4	*	15:4; 9:6	3	3
4	South Korea	Song He-dong	3:13; 6:7	5:23; 2:12	4:15; 6:9	*	0	6

Teams to playoffs

=== Playoffs ===
Semifinal		Final
		New Zealand	10
Australia	6	Japan	6
Japan	8

Semifinal

Team	1	2	3	4	5	6	7	8	9	10	Final
Australia (Hugh Millikin)	0	1	0	0	2	0	2	0	1	X	6
Japan (Makoto Tsuruga)	1	0	2	2	0	2	0	1	0	X	8

Final

Team	1	2	3	4	5	6	7	8	9	10	Final
New Zealand (Sean Becker)	1	0	0	4	0	1	0	4	0	X	10
Japan (Makoto Tsuruga)	0	0	2	0	1	0	2	0	1	0	6

=== Final standings ===
Place	Country	Skip	GP	W	L
1st place, gold medalist(s)	New Zealand	Sean Becker	7	6	1
2nd place, silver medalist(s)	Japan	Makoto Tsuruga	8	4	4
3rd place, bronze medalist(s)	Australia	Hugh Millikin	7	4	3
4	South Korea	Song He-dong	6	0	6

== Women ==
=== Teams ===
Country	Skip	Third	Second	Lead	Alternate	Coach	Curling club
Australia	Lynn Hewitt	Ellen Weir	Sarah Herbert	Lyn Greenwood	Sandy Gagnon		Victoria Curling Association
Japan	Akiko Katoh	Yumie Hayashi	Ayumi Onodera	Mika Hori	Akemi Niwa	Elaine Dagg-Jackson	Tokoro CC
South Korea	Kim Mi-yeon	Lee So-jung	Shin Mi-sung	Kim Se-mi	Lee Hyun-jung		Seoul CC
New Zealand	Lisa Anderson	Kylie Petherick	Karen Rawcliffe	Bridget Becker	Natalie Campbell	Edwin Harley	Alexandra CC

=== Round Robin ===
Final round robin results.

Place	Country	Skip	Wins	Losses
1	Japan	Akiko Katoh	6	0
2	Australia	Lynn Hewitt	3	3
3	New Zealand	Lisa Anderson	2	4
4	South Korea	Kim Mi-yeon	1	5

Teams to playoffs

=== Playoffs ===
Semifinals		Final
		Japan	13
New Zealand	9	New Zealand	6
Australia	6

=== Final standings ===
Place	Country	Skip	GP	W	L
1st place, gold medalist(s)	Japan	Akiko Katoh	7	7	0
2nd place, silver medalist(s)	New Zealand	Lisa Anderson	8	3	5
3rd place, bronze medalist(s)	Australia	Lynn Hewitt	7	3	4
4	South Korea	Kim Mi-yeon	6	1	5
