= Tsuyoshi Ryutaki =

Japanese male curler

- Curler ♂
- Born: May 1, 1985 (age 41); Tokoro, Hokkaido, Japan

Team
- Curling club: Tokoro CC, Tokoro

Curling career
- Member Association: Japan
- World Championship: 1 (2006)
- Pacific-Asia Championship: 1 (2005)
Medal record
Curling
Pacific Championships
| Silver medal – second place | 2005 Taipei |
Japan Men's Championship
| Silver medal – second place | 2008 Karuizawa |
| Bronze medal – third place | 2007 Tokoro |

Tsuyoshi Ryutaki (竜滝 剛, Ryutaki Tsuyoshi; born May 1, 1985 in Tokoro, Hokkaido) is a Japanese male curler.

At the international level, he is a 2005 Pacific silver medallist.

== Teams ==
| Season | Skip | Third | Second | Lead | Alternate | Coach | Events |
|---|---|---|---|---|---|---|---|
| 2005–06 | Yoshiyuki Ohmiya | Makoto Tsuruga | Kazuhiko Ikawa | Yuji Hirama | Tsuyoshi Ryutaki | Wayne Matthewson | PCC 2005 (silver) |
| 2005–06 | Yoshiyuki Ohmiya | Makoto Tsuruga | Tsuyoshi Ryutaki | Kazuhiko Ikawa | Yuji Hirama | Wayne Matthewson | WCC 2006 (11th) |
| 2006–07 | Makoto Tsuruga | Tsuyoshi Ryutaki | Kazuhiko Ikawa | Yusaku Shibaya | | | JMCC 2007 (bronze) |
| 2007–08 | Makoto Tsuruga | Yuki Sawamukai | Tsuyoshi Ryutaki | Tsubasa Sato | Yusaku Shibaya | | JMCC 2008 (silver) |
