= Hisaaki Nakamine =

Japanese curler

- Curler ♂
- Other names: Toshiaki Nakamine
- Born: November 30, 1961 (age 64); Shibetsu, Hokkaido, Japan

Team
- Curling club: Obihiro & Tokoro CC

Curling career
- Member Association: Japan
- Pacific-Asia Championship: 3 (1992, 1997)
- Olympic: 1 (1998)
Medal record
Curling
Pacific-Asia Championships
Silver medal – second place	1992 Karuizawa
Silver medal – second place	1997 Karuizawa
Japan Men's Championship
Gold medal – first place	1997
Gold medal – first place	1998
Gold medal – first place	1999
Bronze medal – third place	1989

Hisaaki Nakamine (Japanese: 中峰 寿彰; born November 30, 1961, in Shibetsu, Hokkaido, Japan) is a Japanese curler, a two-time Pacific-Asian silver medallist (1992, 1996, 1997) and a three-time Japan men's champion (1997, 1998, 1999).

He played for Japan at the 1998 Winter Olympics, where the Japanese team finished in fifth place.

== Teams ==
Season	Skip	Third	Second	Lead	Alternate	Coach	Events
1988–89	Hisaaki Nakamine	Yasuhiro Hatanaka	Kazuhiro Houmura	Koji Toki	Akihiko Sasaki		JMCC 1989 (bronze)
1992–93	?	Hisaaki Nakamine	?	?	?		PCC 1992 (silver)
1996–97	Hirofumi Kudo	Makoto Tsuruga	Hiroshi Sato	Yoshiyuki Ohmiya	Hisaaki Nakamine		JMCC 1997 (gold)
1997–98	Yoshiyuki Ohmiya	Hirofumi Kudo	Hiroshi Sato	Makoto Tsuruga	Hisaaki Nakamine		PCC 1997 (silver)
1997–98	Makoto Tsuruga	Hiroshi Sato	Yoshiyuki Ohmiya	Hirofumi Kudo	Hisaaki Nakamine	Glen Jackson (OG)	JMCC 1998 (gold); WOG 1998 (5th)
1998–99	Hirofumi Kudo	Makoto Tsuruga	Hiroshi Sato	Yoshiyuki Ohmiya	Hisaaki Nakamine		JMCC 1999 (gold)
