= Ryuya Ishigaki =

Japanese male curler

- Curler ♂

Team
- Curling club: Kitami Curling Association, Kitami

Curling career
- Member Association: Japan
- World Championship: 1 (2010)
Medal record
Curling
Japan Men's Championship
Gold medal – first place	2010 Kitami

Ryuya Ishigaki (石垣 龍耶, Ishigaki Ryū) is a Japanese male curler. At the national level, he is a 2010 Japan men's champion curler.

== Teams ==
Season	Skip	Third	Second	Lead	Alternate	Coach	Events
2009–10	Makoto Tsuruga	Yuki Sawamukai	Yusaku Shibaya	Ryosuke Haneishi	Ryuya Ishigaki	Hitoshi Yanagi (WCC)	JMCC 2010 (gold); WCC 2010 (12th)
