= Rina Ida =

Japanese curler

- Curler ♀
- Born: November 27, 1991 (age 34)

Team
- Curling club: Sapporo International Junior College, Hokkaido, Hokkaido Bank Curling Stadium, Sapporo

Curling career
- Member Association: Japan
- World Championship: 1 (2015)
- Other appearances: World Junior Championships: 3 (2011, 2012, 2013), Winter Universiade: 2 (2011, 2013), Pacific-Asia Junior Championships: 4 (2006, 2011, 2012, 2013)
Medal record
Curling
Japan Women's Championship
Silver medal – second place	2010 Tokoro
Bronze medal – third place	2008 Karuizawa
Bronze medal – third place	2013 Sapporo
World Junior Championships
Bronze medal – third place	2013 Sochi
Pacific-Asia Junior Championships
Gold medal – first place	2013 Tokoro
Gold medal – first place	2012 Jeonju City
Gold medal – first place	2011 Naseby
Silver medal – second place	2006 Beijing

Rina Ida (井田 莉菜, Ida Rina; born November 27, 1991) is a Japanese female curler.

== Teams ==
Season	Skip	Third	Second	Lead	Alternate	Coach	Events
2005–06	Megumi Kobayashi	Natsuki Yoshida	Rina Ida	Sayaka Yoshimura		Hirofumi Kobayashi	PJCC 2006 (silver)
2010–11	Sayaka Yoshimura	Rina Ida	Risa Ujihara	Mao Ishigaki	Midori Hachimaru (WUG); Nanami Ohmiya (PJCC, WJCC)	Hirofumi Kobayashi (WUG, WJCC)	WUG 2011 (4th); PJCC 2011 (gold); WJCC 2011 (8th)
2011–12	Sayaka Yoshimura	Rina Ida	Risa Ujihara	Mao Ishigaki	Natsuko Ishiyama	Hirofumi Kobayashi	PJCC 2012 (gold); WJCC 2012 (5th)
2012–13	Sayaka Yoshimura	Rina Ida	Risa Ujihara	Mao Ishigaki	Natsuko Ishiyama	Hirofumi Kobayashi	PJCC 2013 (gold); WJCC 2013 (bronze)
2013–14	Sayaka Yoshimura	Rina Ida	Risa Ujihara	Mao Ishigaki	Natsuko Ishiyama (WUG)		WUG 2013 (7th)
2014–15	Ayumi Ogasawara	Sayaka Yoshimura	Kaho Onodera	Anna Ohmiya	Rina Ida	Fuji Miki	WCC 2015 (6th)
2014–15	Rina Ida	Mao Ishigaki	Kana Ogawa	Natsuko Ishiyama			JWCC 2015 (4th)
2015–16	Rina Ida	Tamami Naito	Mao Ishigaki	Natsuko Ishiyama			JWCC 2016 (6th)
