= Yuji Hirama =

Japanese male curler

- Curler ♂

Team
- Curling club: Tokoro CC, Tokoro

Curling career
- Member Association: Japan
- World Championship: 1 (2006)
- Pacific-Asia Championship: 1 (2005)
Medal record
Curling
Pacific Championships
Silver medal – second place	2005 Taipei
Japan Men's Championship
Gold medal – first place	2004

Yuji Hirama (平間 祐次, Hirama Yūji) is a Japanese male curler.

At the international level, he is a 2005 Pacific silver medallist.

At the national level, he is a 2004 Japan men's champion curler.

== Teams ==
Season	Skip	Third	Second	Lead	Alternate	Coach	Events
2003–04	Yoshiyuki Ohmiya	Makoto Tsuruga	Kazuhiko Ikawa	Yuji Hirama			JMCC 2004 (gold)
2005–06	Yoshiyuki Ohmiya	Makoto Tsuruga	Kazuhiko Ikawa	Yuji Hirama	Tsuyoshi Ryutaki	Wayne Matthewson	PCC 2005 (silver)
2005–06	Yoshiyuki Ohmiya	Makoto Tsuruga	Tsuyoshi Ryutaki	Kazuhiko Ikawa	Yuji Hirama	Wayne Matthewson	WCC 2006 (11th)
