= Curling at the 2003 Asian Winter Games =

- Venue: Aomori City Sports Complex
- Dates: 5–7 February 2003
- Competitors: 40 from 4 nations

Curling at the 2003 Winter Asian Games was at the Aomori City Sports Complex in Aomori, Aomori Prefecture, Japan from February 5–7, with both men's and women's events.

This was the first Winter Asiad that included the sport in the official program.

== Schedule ==
P	Preliminary round	½	Semifinal	F	Final

Event↓/Date →	5th Wed	6th Thu	7th Fri	
Men's team	P	P	½	F
Women's team	P	P	½	F

== Medalists ==
Event	Gold	Silver	Bronze
Men's team	South Korea; Lee Dong-keun; Kim Soo-hyuk; Park Jae-cheol; Choi Min-suk; Ko Seung-wan	Japan; Hiroaki Kashiwagi; Keita Yanagizawa; Jun Nakayama; Kazuto Yanagizawa; Takanori Ichimura	China; Wang Binjiang; Wang Fengchun; Ma Yongjun; Xu Xiaoming; Wang Haicheng
Women's team	Japan; Shinobu Aota; Yukari Okazaki; Eriko Minatoya; Kotomi Ishizaki; Satomi Tsujii	South Korea; Kim Mi-yeon; Park Ji-hyun; Shin Mi-sung; Lee Hyun-jung; Park Kyung-mi	China; Zhao Zhenzhen; Liu Yin; Zhan Jing; Yue Qingshuang; Wang Bingyu

== Medal table ==
Rank	Nation	Gold	Silver	Bronze	Total
1	Japan (JPN)	1	1	0	2
1	South Korea (KOR)	1	1	0	2
3	China (CHN)	0	0	2	2
Totals (3 entries)		2	2	2	6

== Participating nations ==
A total of 40 athletes from 4 nations competed in curling at the 2003 Asian Winter Games:

- China (10)
- Chinese Taipei (10)
- Japan (10)
- South Korea (10)

== Final standing ==
=== Men ===
Rank	Team	Pld	W	L
1st place, gold medalist(s)	South Korea	5	4	1
2nd place, silver medalist(s)	Japan	6	3	3
3rd place, bronze medalist(s)	China	6	3	3
4	Chinese Taipei	3	0	3

=== Women ===
Rank	Team	Pld	W	L
1st place, gold medalist(s)	Japan	4	4	0
2nd place, silver medalist(s)	South Korea	5	3	2
3rd place, bronze medalist(s)	China	4	1	3
4	Chinese Taipei	3	0	3
