= Jim Allan =

New Zealand and Australian male curler

- Curler ♂

Team
- Curling club: Ranfurly CC, Ranfurly, New Zealand; Dunedin CC

Curling career
- Member Association: New Zealand; Australia
- World Championship: 2 (1999, 2001)
- Pacific-Asia Championship: 6 (1996, 1998, 1999, 2000, 2002, 2003)
- Other appearances: World Senior Championships: 4 (2011, 2013, 2014, 2017)
Medal record
Curling
Pacific Championships
Gold medal – first place	1998 Qualicum Beach
Gold medal – first place	2000 Esquimalt
Gold medal – first place	2003 Aomori
Bronze medal – third place	1996 Sydney
Bronze medal – third place	1999 Tokoro
New Zealand Men's Championship
Gold medal – first place	1998
Gold medal – first place	2003
World Senior Championships
Bronze medal – third place	2011 St. Paul
Bronze medal – third place	2014 Dumfries

Jim Allan is a New Zealand and Australian (on Seniors) curler.

At the international level, he is a three-time Pacific champion curler (1998, 2000, 2003)

At the national level, he is a two-time New Zealand men's champion (1998, 2003).

== Teams ==
Season	Skip	Third	Second	Lead	Alternate	Coach	Events
1996–97	Peter Becker	Sean Becker	Jim Allan	Ross A. Stevens	Lorne De Pape	Edwin Harley	PCC 1996 (bronze)
1998–99	Sean Becker	Hans Frauenlob	Jim Allan	Lorne De Pape	Darren Carson	Edwin Harley	PCC 1998 (gold); WCC 1999 (10th)
1999–00	Sean Becker	Hans Frauenlob	Jim Allan	Lorne De Pape	Darren Carson	Edwin Harley	PCC 1999 (bronze)
2000–01	Dan Mustapic	Sean Becker	Hans Frauenlob	Jim Allan	Lorne De Pape	Edwin Harley	PCC 2000 (gold)
2000–01	Dan Mustapic	Sean Becker	Hans Frauenlob	Lorne De Pape	Jim Allan	Edwin Harley	WCC 2001 (9th)
2002–03	Sean Becker	Hans Frauenlob	Jim Allan	Lorne De Pape	Dan Mustapic		PCC 2002 (4th)
2003–04	Sean Becker	Hans Frauenlob	Jim Allan	Lorne De Pape	Warren Dobson	Peter Becker	PCC 2003 (gold)
2010–11	Hugh Millikin	John Theriault	Jim Allan	Dave Thomas	Tom Kidd	Jay Merchant	WSCC 2011 (bronze)
2012–13	Hugh Millikin	Jim Allan	Stephen Hewitt	Dan Hogan	Wyatt Buck		WSCC 2013 (6th)
2013–14	Hugh Millikin	Wyatt Buck	Jim Allan	Rob Gagnon	John Anderson	Sandra Thompson	WSCC 2014 (bronze)
2016–17	Hugh Millikin	John Theriault	Jim Allan	Stephen Johns	John Anderson	Sandra Thompson	WSCC 2017 (5th)
