= Trevor Schumm =

Australian male curler

- Curler ♂
- Born: c. 1967; Edmonton, Alberta, Canada

Team
- Curling club: Sydney Harbour CC, Sydney

Curling career
- Member Association: Australia
- World Championship: 1 (1998)
- Pacific-Asia Championship: 1 (1997)
Medal record
Curling
Pacific-Asia Championships
Gold medal – first place	1997 Karuizawa

Trevor Schumm (born c. 1967) is a Canadian-Australian curler and baseball coach and scout.

At the international level, he is a 1997 Pacific-Asia men's champion curler; the team, skipped by Hugh Millikin represented Australia at the 1998 World Men's Curling Championships.

Schumm grew up on a farm near Spruce Grove, Alberta. He played baseball, ice hockey and Canadian football in his youth, and was the quarterback of his high school's football team. He then played junior college baseball at Allan Hancock College, played in spring training for the California Angels, and both played and coached at Cornell University. The returned to Alberta to coach there, and then moved to Australia in 1995, taking a job with the Australian Capital Territory academy of sport, and worked as a youth baseball coach. In 2000, he coached the Australian team at the World Junior Baseball Championship. There, he was involved in a brawl between the Australian and Cuban teams, and was kicked out of the tournament by the International Baseball Federation.

In 2008, he became a scouting coordinator for the San Diego Padres.

Schumm comes from a football family. His father Howie and uncle Herb played for the Edmonton Eskimos and the Calgary Stampeders.

== Teams and events ==
Season	Skip	Third	Second	Lead	Alternate	Events
1997–98	Hugh Millikin	John Theriault	Stephen Johns	Trevor Schumm		PCC 1997 (gold)
1997–98	Hugh Millikin	Trevor Schumm	John Theriault	Stephen Johns	Stephen Hewitt	WCC 1998 (9th)
