= Yoshiro Shimizu =

Japanese male curler

- Curler ♂
- Born: March 9, 1993 (age 33); Tokyo, Japan

Team
- Curling club: Karuizawa CC, Karuizawa, JPN

Curling career
- Member Association: Japan
- World Championship: 1 (2013)
- Pacific-Asia Championship: 1 (2012)
- Other appearances: Pacific-Asia Junior Championships: 2 (2010, 2011)
Medal record
Curling
Pacific-Asia Championships
Silver medal – second place	2012 Naseby
Japan Men's Championship
Bronze medal – third place	2018 Nayoro
Pacific-Asia Junior Championships
Silver medal – second place	2010 Nayoro
Bronze medal – third place	2011 Naseby

Yoshiro Shimizu (清水 芳郎, Shimizu Yoshirō; born March 9, 1993 in Tokyo) is a Japanese curler.

At the international level, he is a 2012 Pacific-Asia silver medallist.

== Teams ==
Season	Skip	Third	Second	Lead	Alternate	Coach	Events
2009–10	Yuta Matsumura	Keita Satoh	Yoshiro Shimizu	Hiroaki Ogawa	Yusaku Shibaya		PAJCC 2010 (silver)
2010–11	Yuta Matsumura	Yoshiro Shimizu	Yuki Tsuchiya	Hiroaki Ogawa	Yusaku Shibaya		PAJCC 2011 (bronze)
2011–12	Yuta Matsumura	Yuki Sakamoto	Yoshiro Shimizu	Yukako Tsuchiya			
2012–13	Yusuke Morozumi	Tsuyoshi Yamaguchi	Tetsuro Shimizu	Kosuke Morozumi	Yoshiro Shimizu	Tadashi Fujimaki (PACC); Hatomi Nagaoka (PACC, WCC)	PACC 2012 (silver); WCC 2013 (11th)
2013–14	Tamotsu Matsumura	Yuki Sakamoto	Yoshiro Shimizu	Hayato Satoh	Hayato Matsumura		JMCC 2014 (???th)
2014–15	Tamotsu Matsumura	Yoshiro Shimizu	Yuki Sakamoto	Yasuo Mochida			
2017–18	Yoshiro Shimizu	Yuki Sakamoto	Riku Yanagisawa	Hayato Sato			JMCC 2018 (bronze)
2018–19	Yoshiro Shimizu	Tamotsu Matsumura	Yuki Sakamoto	Hayato Sato	Yasuo Mochida		
2019–20	Yoshiro Shimizu	Tamotsu Matsumura	Yuki Sakamoto	Hayato Sato	Yasuo Mochida		
