= Yusaku Shibaya =

Japanese male curler

- Curler ♂

Team
- Curling club: Kitami Curling Association, Kitami

Curling career
- Member Association: Japan
- World Championship: 1 (2010)
- Pacific-Asia Championship: 2 (2010, 2011)
- Other appearances: Pacific-Asia Junior Championships: 3 (2010, 2011, 2012)
Medal record
Curling
Japan Men's Championship
| Gold medal – first place | 2010 Kitami |
| Gold medal – first place | 2011 Nayoro |
| Silver medal – second place | 2008 Karuizawa |
| Silver medal – second place | 2009 Aomori |
| Silver medal – second place | 2012 Aomori |
| Silver medal – second place | 2013 Sapporo |
| Bronze medal – third place | 2015 Tokoro |
| Bronze medal – third place | 2017 Karuizawa |
Pacific-Asia Junior Championships
| Silver medal – second place | 2010 Nayoro |
| Bronze medal – third place | 2011 Naseby |
| Bronze medal – third place | 2012 Jeonju City |

Yusaku Shibaya (柴谷 優策, Shibaya Yūsaku) is a Japanese male curler.

At the national level, he is a two-time Japan men's champion curler (2010, 2011).

== Teams ==
| Season | Skip | Third | Second | Lead | Alternate | Coach | Events |
|---|---|---|---|---|---|---|---|
| 2007–08 | Makoto Tsuruga | Yuki Sawamukai | Tsuyoshi Ryutaki | Tsubasa Sato | Yusaku Shibaya | | JMCC 2008 (silver) |
| 2008–09 | Makoto Tsuruga | Yuki Sawamukai | Yusaku Shibaya | Ryosuke Haneishi | Ryoji Onodera | | JMCC 2009 (silver) |
| 2009–10 | Yuta Matsumura | Keita Satoh | Yoshiro Shimizu | Hiroaki Ogawa | Yusaku Shibaya | | PJCC 2010 (silver) |
| 2009–10 | Makoto Tsuruga | Yuki Sawamukai | Yusaku Shibaya | Ryosuke Haneishi | Ryuya Ishigaki | Hitoshi Yanagi (WCC) | JMCC 2010 (gold); WCC 2010 (12th) |
| 2010–11 | Yuta Matsumura | Yoshiro Shimizu | Yuki Tsuchiya | Hiroaki Ogawa | Yusaku Shibaya | | PJCC 2011 (bronze) |
| 2010–11 | Makoto Tsuruga | Yuki Sawamukai | Yusaku Shibaya | Ryosuke Haneishi | Taichi Teramachi | Tetsu Eda (PCC), Kenichi Sato (PCC) | PCC 2010 (6th); JMCC 2011 (gold) |
| 2011–12 | Yusaku Shibaya | Yuji Kobayashi | Tomoya Ogawa | Tomoya Yamazaki | Takuroh Mukaihira | Hiroshi Tsuruga | PAJCC 2012 (bronze) |
| 2011–12 | Makoto Tsuruga | Yuki Sawamukai | Yusaku Shibaya | Ryosuke Haneishi | Taichi Teramachi | Shinya Abe (PCC), Hitoshi Matsudaira (PCC) | PCC 2011 (6th); JMCC 2012 (silver) |
| 2012–13 | Makoto Tsuruga | Yuki Sawamukai | Yusaku Shibaya | Ryosuke Haneishi | Taichi Teramachi | | JMCC 2013 (silver) |
| 2013–14 | Makoto Tsuruga | Yuki Sawamukai | Yusaku Shibaya | Ryosuke Haneishi | Taichi Teramachi | | |
| 2014–15 | Kouji Tsuruga | Yuki Sawamukai | Yusaku Shibaya | Ryosuke Haneishi | | | JMCC 2015 (bronze) |
| 2016–17 | Yuki Sawamukai | Yusaku Shibaya | Taiga Saito | Ryosuke Haneishi | | | JMCC 2017 (bronze) |
