= Hiroshi Sato (curler) =

Japanese male curler and curling coach

- Curler
- Born: 30 January 1978 (age 48); Tokoro, Hokkaido, Japan

Team
- Curling club: Obihiro & Tokoro CC
- Skip: Shinya Abe
- Third: Yuta Matsumura
- Second: Yuki Hayashi
- Lead: Hiroshi Sato
- Alternate: Yasumasa Tanida

Curling career
- Pacific-Asia Championship: 3 (1996, 1997, 1998)
- Olympic: 1 (1998)
Medal record
Men's curling
Representing Japan
Pacific-Asia Championships
Silver medal – second place	1996 Sydney
Silver medal – second place	1997 Karuizawa
Silver medal – second place	1998 Qualicum Beach

Hiroshi Sato (佐藤 浩, Satō Hiroshi; born January 30, 1978) is a Japanese curler and curling coach from Tokoro, Hokkaido, Japan.

He represented Japan at the 1998 Winter Olympics in Nagano, where the Japanese men's team placed 5th.

== Teams and events ==
Season	Skip	Third	Second	Lead	Alternate	Coach	Events
1994	Hiroshi Sato	Nobumitsu Fujisawa	Yoshihiro Kataoka	Naoki Kudo	Hidetaka Sunaga		WJCC 1994 (9th)
1995	Hiroshi Sato	Naoki Kudo	Yoshihiro Kataoka	Nobumitsu Fujisawa	Yusuke Hirosawa		WJCC 1995 (6th)
1996	Hiroshi Sato	Makoto Tsuruga	Kazuhito Hori	Shinya Abe	Hiroshi Tsuruga		WJCC 1996 (7th)
1996–97	Hiroshi Sato	Makoto Tsuruga	Kazuhito Hori	Shinya Abe	Hirohumi Kudo		JMCC 1996 (gold); PCC 1996 (silver)
1997–98	Yoshiyuki Ohmiya	Hirohumi Kudo	Hiroshi Sato	Makoto Tsuruga	Hisaaki Nakamine		PCC 1997 (silver)
1997–98	Makoto Tsuruga	Hiroshi Sato	Yoshiyuki Ohmiya	Hirohumi Kudo	Hisaaki Nakamine	Glen Jackson	WOG 1998 (5th)
1997–98	Makoto Tsuruga	Hiroshi Sato	Kazuhito Hori	Shinya Abe	Yusuke Hirosawa		WJCC 1998 (5th)
1998–99	Makoto Tsuruga	Kazuhito Hori	Hiroshi Sato	Naoki Kudo	Yoshiyuki Ohmiya	Glen Jackson	PCC 1998 (silver)
1999–00	Makoto Tsuruga	Kazuhito Hori	Hiroshi Sato	Naoki Kudo			
2012–13	Shinya Abe	Yuta Matsumura	Naomasa Takeda	Hiroshi Sato	Yuki Hayashi		
2013–14	Shinya Abe	Yuta Matsumura	Naomasa Takeda	Hiroshi Sato	Yuki Hayashi		
2014–15	Shinya Abe	Yuta Matsumura	Yuki Hayashi	Hiroshi Sato			JMCC 2015 (silver)
2015–16	Shinya Abe	Yuta Matsumura	Yuki Hayashi	Hiroshi Sato			JMCC 2016 (bronze)
2016–17	Shinya Abe	Yuta Matsumura	Yuki Hayashi	Hiroshi Sato	Yasumasa Tanida		JMCC 2017 (silver)

== Record as a coach of national teams ==
Year	Tournament, event	National team	Place
2017	2017 World Mixed Doubles Curling Championship	Japan (mixed doubles)	19
