= Kazakoshi Park Arena =

Indoor arena in Nagano Prefecture, Japan

Coordinates: 36°19′26″N 138°35′55″E

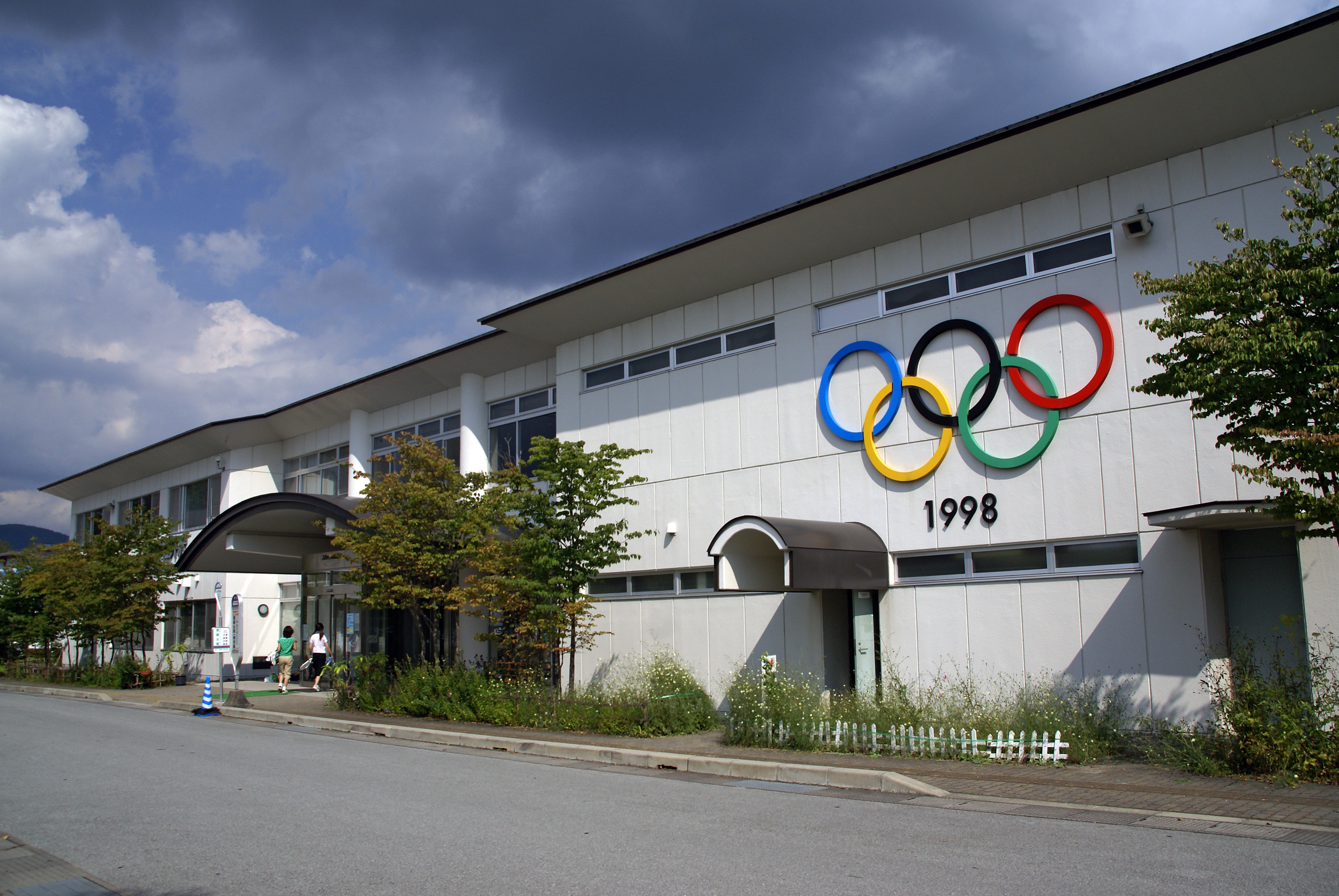
- Interactive map of Kazakoshi Park Arena
- Location: Karuizawa, Nagano, Japan
- Type: Indoor arena

Construction
- Built: 1990
- Opened: 1996

Kazakoshi Park Arena is an indoor arena located in Karuizawa, Nagano, Japan. Constructed in 1990 with an opening ceremony taking place in 1996, it hosted the curling competition for the 1998 Winter Olympics in Nagano. Because it was in Karuizawa, the town became the first venue to host events at both the Summer and Winter Olympics. At the 1964 Summer Olympics in Tokyo, Karuizawa hosted the equestrian events.
