= Yoshiyuki Ohmiya =

Japanese curler

- Curler
- Born: 8 January 1959 (age 67); Kitami, Hokkaido, Japan

Team
- Curling club: Obihiro & Tokoro CC

Curling career
- World Championship: 1 (2006)
- Pacific-Asia Championship: 5 (1994, 1995, 1997, 1998, 2005)
- Olympic: 1 (1998)
Medal record
Men's curling
Representing Japan
Pacific-Asia Championships
| Silver medal – second place | 1994 Christchurch |
| Silver medal – second place | 1995 Tokoro |
| Silver medal – second place | 1997 Karuizawa |
| Silver medal – second place | 1998 Qualicum Beach |
| Silver medal – second place | 2005 Taipei |

Yoshiyuki Ohmiya (近江谷 好幸, Ōmiya Yoshiyuki; born January 8, 1959) is a Japanese curler and curling coach from Kitami, Hokkaido, Japan.

He represented Japan at the 1998 Winter Olympics in Nagano, where the Japanese men's team placed 5th.

His daughter is Japanese female curler Anna Ohmiya, participant of Japan women's curling team on 2010 Winter Olympics in Vancouver, Canada.

== Teams and events ==
| Season | Skip | Third | Second | Lead | Alternate | Coach | Events |
|---|---|---|---|---|---|---|---|
| 1994–95 | Shigenori Sato | Yoshiyuki Ohmiya | Yoshihiro Imahashi | Toshio Yano | Takahiro Sekine | Shuji Abe | PCC 1994 (silver) |
| 1995–96 | Yoshiyuki Ohmiya | ? | ? | ? | ? | ? | PCC 1995 (silver) |
| 1997–98 | Yoshiyuki Ohmiya | Hirohumi Kudo | Hiroshi Sato | Makoto Tsuruga | Hisaaki Nakamine | | PCC 1997 (silver) |
| 1997–98 | Makoto Tsuruga | Hiroshi Sato | Yoshiyuki Ohmiya | Hirofumi Kudo | Hisaaki Nakamine | Glen Jackson | WOG 1998 (5th) |
| 1998–99 | Makoto Tsuruga | Kazuhito Hori | Hiroshi Sato | Naoki Kudo | Yoshiyuki Ohmiya | Glen Jackson | PCC 1998 (silver) |
| 2005–06 | Yoshiyuki Ohmiya | Makoto Tsuruga | Kazuhiko Ikawa | Yuji Hirama | Tsuyoshi Ryutaki | Wayne Matthewson | PCC 2005 (silver) |
| 2005–06 | Yoshiyuki Ohmiya | Makoto Tsuruga | Tsuyoshi Ryutaki | Kazuhiko Ikawa | Yuji Hirama | Wayne Matthewson | WMCC 2006 (11th) |

== Record as a coach of national teams ==
| Year | Tournament, event | National team | Place |
|---|---|---|---|
| 2001 | 2001 Ford World Women's Curling Championship | Japan (women) | 7 |
| 2001 | 2001 Pacific Curling Championships | Japan (women) | 2nd place, silver medalist(s) |
| 2007 | 2007 Pacific Junior Curling Championships | Japan (junior women) | 4 |
