= Ryo Ogihara =

Japanese curler

- Curler ♂
- Born: January 14, 1987 (age 39); Nagano, Japan
Medal record
Pacific Junior Curling Championships
Silver medal – second place	2008 Jeonju City
Bronze medal – third place	2007 Naseby

Ryo Ogihara is a Japanese curler. He currently skips a team out of Karuizawa on the World Curling Tour.

As a junior curler, he skipped the Japanese team of Tetsuro Shimizu, Yuki Sakamoto and Yuta Matsumura to a bronze medal finish at the 2007 Pacific Junior Curling Championships. The following year, Ogihara played second for the Japanese team at the 2008 Pacific Juniors. The team, skipped by Sakamoto would win the silver medal.

Ogihara was also the alternate for the Japanese team at the 2007 Winter Universiade. The team, skipped by Yusuke Morozumi finished 5th and Ogihara would play in five games for the team.

On the World Curling Tour, Ogihara has won two events, the 2016 Minebea Cup and the 2019 Morioka City Men's Memorial Cup.

In addition to playing, Ogihara was the coach of the Japanese women's team at the 2019 Winter Universiade.
