= 2000 World Junior Curling Championships =

- Host city: Geising, Germany
- Dates: March 18–26, 2000
- Men's winner: Canada
- Skip: Brad Kuhn
- Third: Kevin Folk
- Second: Ryan Kuhn
- Lead: Hugh Bennett
- Alternate: Jeff Richard
- Coach: Jock Tyre
- Finalist: Switzerland (Patrick Vuille)
- Women's winner: Sweden
- Skip: Matilda Mattsson
- Third: Kajsa Bergström
- Second: Lisa Löfskog
- Lead: Jenny Hammarström
- Alternate: Ann-Christine Nordqvist
- Coach: Lars-Åke Nordström
- Finalist: Canada (Stefanie Miller)

The 2000 World Junior Curling Championships were held at Geising, Germany March 18–26.

== Men's ==
Country	Skip	Wins	Losses
Switzerland	Patrick Vuille	7	2
Denmark	Kasper Wiksten	6	3
Canada	Brad Kuhn	6	3
Germany	Christian Baumann	6	3
Japan	Hiroaki Kashiwagi	5	4
Scotland	Duncan Fernie	4	5
Sweden	Mikael Sundqvist	4	5
United States	Randy Baird	4	5
Norway	Thomas Berntsen	3	6
Czech Republic	Vit Nekovarik	0	9

=== Playoffs ===
Semi-final
1	Switzerland	7
4	Germany	2
2	Denmark	4
3	Canada	10

Final
1	Switzerland	4
3	Canada	8
Bronze medal
2	Denmark	3
4	Germany	9

== Women's ==
Country	Skip	Wins	Losses
Canada	Stefanie Miller	8	1
United States	Laura Delaney	7	2
Sweden	Matilda Mattsson	6	3
Switzerland	Carmen Schäfer	5	4
Japan	Moe Meguro	5	4
Scotland	Louise Tasker	4	5
Russia	Nina Golovtchenko	4	5
Norway	Linn Githmark	3	6
Germany	Carmen Fessler	3	6
France	Sandrine Morand	0	9

=== Tie-breaker ===
- Switzerland 7-5 Japan

=== Playoffs ===
Semi-final
1	Canada	9
4	Switzerland	3
2	United States	5
3	Sweden	8

Final
1	Canada	5
3	Sweden	6
Bronze medal
4	Switzerland	5
2	United States	8

== Sources ==
- Men's results from the World Curling Federation
- Women's results from the World Curling Federation
