= Curling at the 2003 Asian Winter Games – Men's team =

Men's team at the 2003 Asian Winter Games
- Venue: Aomori City Sports Complex
- Dates: 5–7 February 2003
- Competitors: 20 from 4 nations

Medalists
gold medal	South Korea; Lee Dong-keun, Kim Soo-hyuk, Park Jae-cheol, Choi Min-suk, Ko Seung-wan
silver medal	Japan; Hiroaki Kashiwagi, Keita Yanagizawa, Jun Nakayama, Kazuto Yanagizawa, Takanori Ichimura
bronze medal	China; Wang Binjiang, Wang Fengchun, Ma Yongjun, Xu Xiaoming, Wang Haicheng

The men's curling at the 2003 Asian Winter Games was held from February 5 to February 7, 2003, at Aomori City Sports Complex, Japan.

South Korea won the gold medal after beating Japan in the final.

== Squads ==
China	Chinese Taipei	Japan	South Korea
Wang Binjiang; Wang Fengchun; Ma Yongjun; Xu Xiaoming; Wang Haicheng	Nicholas Hsu; Jimmy Wang; Brendon Liu; Evan Lu; Justin Hsu	Hiroaki Kashiwagi; Keita Yanagizawa; Jun Nakayama; Kazuto Yanagizawa; Takanori Ichimura	Lee Dong-keun; Kim Soo-hyuk; Park Jae-cheol; Choi Min-suk; Ko Seung-wan

== Results ==
All times are Japan Standard Time (UTC+09:00)

=== Preliminary ===
Pos	Team	Skip	Pld	W	L	W–L	PF	PA	Qualification
1	South Korea	Lee Dong-keun	3	2 (Note: Play-off first round: CHN 8–6 JPN. First place play-off match: KOR 4–3 CHN.)	1	1–1	20	13	Final
2	China	Wang Binjiang	3	2	1	1–1	19	21	Semifinal
3	Japan	Hiroaki Kashiwagi	3	2	1	1–1	18	15	Semifinal
4	Chinese Taipei	Nicholas Hsu	3	0	3	—	13	21	

Source: World Curling
Notes:

5 February, 12:00

Sheet A	1	2	3	4	5	6	7	8	9	10	11	Final
China	0	1	0	1	0	3	0	1	0	0	3	9
Japan 🔨	2	0	1	0	1	0	1	0	0	1	0	6

Sheet C	1	2	3	4	5	6	7	8	9	10	Final
South Korea	0	0	1	1	1	0	3	0	0	1	7
Chinese Taipei 🔨	0	0	0	0	0	3	0	2	0	0	5

5 February, 17:00

Sheet B	1	2	3	4	5	6	7	8	9	10	Final
China	0	0	1	0	1	0	1	0	1	0	4
South Korea 🔨	0	1	0	1	0	3	0	4	0	1	10

Sheet D	1	2	3	4	5	6	7	8	9	10	Final
Japan	0	1	0	1	0	1	1	0	2	2	8
Chinese Taipei 🔨	0	0	1	0	1	0	0	1	0	0	3

6 February, 10:00

Sheet A	1	2	3	4	5	6	7	8	9	10	Final
South Korea	0	0	0	1	0	0	0	1	1	0	3
Japan 🔨	1	1	0	0	0	2	0	0	0	0	4

Sheet C	1	2	3	4	5	6	7	8	9	10	Final
Chinese Taipei	0	1	0	3	0	0	1	0	0	0	5
China 🔨	2	0	1	0	1	0	0	1	0	1	6

==== Tiebreaker ====
6 February, 15:00

Sheet A	1	2	3	4	5	6	7	8	9	10	Final
Japan	0	0	0	0	3	1	0	1	1	0	6
China 🔨	0	1	2	1	0	0	3	0	0	1	8

6 February, 20:30

Sheet C	1	2	3	4	5	6	7	8	9	10	Final
China	0	0	0	0	1	1	0	1	0	0	3
South Korea 🔨	0	0	0	1	0	0	2	0	0	1	4

=== Knockout round ===
Semifinal			Final
			1	South Korea	6
2	China	5	3	Japan	4
3	Japan	9

==== Semifinal ====
7 February, 9:30

Sheet A	1	2	3	4	5	6	7	8	9	10	Final
Japan	0	0	1	0	2	1	1	3	0	1	9
China 🔨	0	1	0	2	0	0	0	0	2	0	5

==== Final ====
7 February, 14:30

Sheet A	1	2	3	4	5	6	7	8	9	10	Final
South Korea 🔨	0	0	0	0	1	0	2	2	0	1	6
Japan	0	1	0	0	0	1	0	0	2	0	4

== Final standing ==
Rank	Team	Pld	W	L
1st place, gold medalist(s)	South Korea	5	4	1
2nd place, silver medalist(s)	Japan	6	3	3
3rd place, bronze medalist(s)	China	6	3	3
4	Chinese Taipei	3	0	3
