= Choi Min-suk =

South Korean male curler and coach

- Curler
- Born: January 18, 1979 (age 47)

Team
- Curling club: Gyeong-buk CC, Gyeongbuk

Curling career
- Member Association: South Korea
- World Championship: 1 (2003)
- Pacific-Asia Championship: 3 (2001, 2002, 2003)
Medal record
Men's curling
Representing South Korea
Pacific-Asia Championships
Gold medal – first place	2002 Queenstown
Bronze medal – third place	2003 Aomori
Asian Winter Games
Gold medal – first place	2003 Aomori
Winter Universiade
Bronze medal – third place	2003 Tarvisio
Representing Gyeonggi
Korean Men's Championship
Silver medal – second place	2011 Uijeongbu
Silver medal – second place	2012 Uijeongbu

Choi Min-suk (born October 24, 1975) is a South Korean male curler and curling coach.

At the international level, he is a 2002 Pacific champion curler, 2003 Pacific bronze medallist, 2007 Asian Winter Games champion curler and 2003 Winter Universiade bronze medallist.

== Teams ==
Season	Skip	Third	Second	Lead	Alternate	Coach	Events
2001–02	Lee Dong-keun	Kim Soo-hyuk	Choi Min-suk	Park Jae-cheol	Hong Jun-pyo	Glen Jackson	PCC 2001 (4th)
2002–03	Lee Dong-keun	Park Jae-cheol	Kim Soo-hyuk	Choi Min-suk	Ko Seung-wan	Yang Young-sun	WUG 2003 (bronze)
2002–03	Lee Dong-keun	Park Jae-cheol	Ko Seung-wan	Choi Min-suk	Kim Soo-hyuk	Melissa Soligo	PCC 2002 (gold)
2002–03	Lee Dong-keun	Kim Soo-hyuk	Park Jae-cheol	Choi Min-suk	Ko Seung-wan	Elaine Dagg-Jackson (WCC)	AWG 2003 (gold); WCC 2003 (10th)
2003–04	Lee Dong-keun	Park Jae-cheol	Ko Seung-wan	Choi Min-suk	Kim Hyun-chul	Yang Young-sun	PCC 2003 (bronze)

== Record as a coach of national teams ==
Year	Tournament, event	National team	Place
2008	2008 Pacific Curling Championships	South Korea (women)	2nd place, silver medalist(s)
2009	2009 World Women's Curling Championship	South Korea (women)	10
2010	2010 Pacific Curling Championships	South Korea (women)	1st place, gold medalist(s)
2011	2011 World Women's Curling Championship	South Korea (women)	11
2011	2011 Pacific-Asia Curling Championships	South Korea (women)	2nd place, silver medalist(s)
2012	2012 World Women's Curling Championship	South Korea (women)	4
2013	2013 Pacific-Asia Curling Championships	South Korea (women)	1st place, gold medalist(s)
2013	2013 Winter Universiade	South Korea (junior women)	2nd place, silver medalist(s)
2014	2014 Winter Olympics	South Korea (women)	8
2014	2014 World Women's Curling Championship	South Korea (women)	4
