= Lee Hyun-jung (curler) =

South Korean curler (born 1978)

- Curler
- Born: September 27, 1978 (age 48)

Team
- Curling club: Seoul CC, Seoul, Gyeonggi-do CC, Uijeongbu, KOR

Curling career
- Member Association: South Korea
- World Championship: 4 (2002, 2009, 2011, 2012)
- Pacific-Asia Championship: 12 (1996, 1997, 1998, 2000, 2001, 2002, 2003, 2004, 2007, 2008, 2010, 2011)
- Other appearances: Winter Universiade: 1 (2003), Asian Winter Games: 1 (2003)
Medal record
Women's curling
Representing South Korea
Pacific-Asia Championships
Gold medal – first place	2001 Jeonju
Gold medal – first place	2010 Uiseong
Silver medal – second place	2000 Esquimalt
Silver medal – second place	2002 Queenstown
Silver medal – second place	2003 Aomori
Silver medal – second place	2008 Naseby
Silver medal – second place	2011 Nanjing
Bronze medal – third place	1997 Karuizawa
Bronze medal – third place	2004 Chuncheon
Bronze medal – third place	2007 Beijing
Asian Winter Games
Silver medal – second place	2003 Aomori
Representing Gyeonggi
Korean Women's Championship
Gold medal – first place	2011 Uijeongbu
Bronze medal – third place	2012 Uijeongbu

Lee Hyun-jung (born September 27, 1978) is a South Korean curler.

At the international level, she is two-time Pacific champion curler (2001, 2010).

== Teams ==
Season	Skip	Third	Second	Lead	Alternate	Coach	Events
1996–97	Lee So-jung	Lee Hyun-jung	Lee Im Sum	Lim Jung Min			PCC 1996 (4th)
1997–98	Lee Hyun-jung	Choi Yun Mi	Jang Ji Young	Park Sun Nam	Yoon Hye Kyung		PCC 1997 (bronze)
1998–99	Kim Mi-yeon	Lee So-jung	Shin Mi-sung	Kim Se-mi	Lee Hyun-jung		PCC 1998 (4th)
2000–01	Kim Mi-yeon	Go Min Kyung	Lee Hyun-jung	Park Ji-hyun	Shun Mi Sung		PCC 2000 (silver)
2001–02	Kim Mi-yeon	Lee Hyun-jung	Shin Mi-sung	Park Ji-hyun		Elaine Dagg-Jackson	PCC 2001 (gold); WCC 2002 (10th)
2002–03	Kim Mi-yeon	Lee Hyun-jung	Shin Mi-sung	Park Ji-hyun	Park Kyung-mi	Elaine Dagg-Jackson, Kim Hyun-kyung	PCC 2002 (silver)
2003	Kim Mi-yeon	Park Ji-hyun	Shin Mi-sung	Lee Hyun-jung	Park Kyung-mi	Kim Hyun-kyung	WUG 2003 (5th); AWG 2003 (silver)
2003–04	Kim Mi-yeon	Lee Hyun-jung	Shin Mi-sung	Park Ji-hyun	Park Kyung-mi	Kim Hyun-kyung	PCC 2003 (silver)
2004–05	Kim Mi-yeon	Lee Hyun-jung	Shin Mi-sung	Park Ji-hyun	Park Kyung-mi	Melissa Soligo, Yoo Kun Jick	PCC 2004 (bronze)
2007–08	Park Ji-hyun	Kim Mi-yeon	Shin Mi-sung	Park Kyung-mi	Lee Hyun-jung	Chung Young Sup, Shin Young-kook	PCC 2007 (bronze)
2008–09	Kim Mi-yeon	Shin Mi-sung	Lee Hyun-jung	Park Kyung-mi	Lee Seul-bee	Chung Young Sup, Choi Min-suk	PCC 2008 (silver)
2008–09	Kim Mi-yeon	Shin Mi-sung	Lee Seul-bee	Lee Hyun-jung	Kim Ji-sun	Chung Young Sup, Choi Min-suk	WCC 2009 (10th)
2010–11	Kim Ji-sun	Lee Seul-bee	Shin Mi-sung	Gim Un-chi	Lee Hyun-jung	Choi Min-suk	PCC 2010 (gold); WCC 2011 (11th)
2011–12	Kim Ji-sun	Lee Seul-bee	Gim Un-chi	Lee Hyun-jung	Shin Mi-sung	Choi Min-suk	PACC 2011 (silver)
2011–12	Kim Ji-sun	Lee Seul-bee	Shin Mi-sung	Gim Un-chi	Lee Hyun-jung	Choi Min-suk	WCC 2012 (4th)
