= Lee Hyun-jung =

Lee Hyun-jung may refer to:

- Lee Hyun-jung (basketball) (이현중), South Korean basketball player (born 2000)
- Lee Hyun-jung (curler) (이현정), South Korean curler (born 1978)
