= Ko Seung-wan =

South Korean curler

- Curler ♂
- Born: December 4, 1981 (age 44)

Team
- Curling club: Gyeong-buk CC, Gyeongbuk

Curling career
- Member Association: South Korea
- World Championship: 1 (2003)
- Pacific-Asia Championship: 2 (2002, 2003)
- Other appearances: Winter Universiade: 2 (2003, 2007), Asian Winter Games: 1 (2003)
Medal record
Curling
Pacific-Asia Championships
Gold medal – first place	2002 Queenstown
Bronze medal – third place	2003 Aomori
Asian Winter Games
Gold medal – first place	2003 Aomori
Winter Universiade
Bronze medal – third place	2003 Tarvisio

Ko Seung-wan (born December 4, 1981) is a South Korean male curler.

At the international level, he is a 2002 Pacific champion curler, 2003 Pacific bronze medallist, 2007 Asian Winter Games champion curler and 2003 Winter Universiade bronze medallist.

== Teams ==
Season	Skip	Third	Second	Lead	Alternate	Coach	Events
2002–03	Lee Dong-keun	Park Jae-cheol	Kim Soo-hyuk	Choi Min-suk	Ko Seung-wan	Yang Young-sun	WUG 2003 (bronze)
2002–03	Lee Dong-keun	Park Jae-cheol	Ko Seung-wan	Choi Min-suk	Kim Soo-hyuk	Melissa Soligo	PCC 2002 (gold)
2002–03	Lee Dong-keun	Kim Soo-hyuk	Park Jae-cheol	Choi Min-suk	Ko Seung-wan	Elaine Dagg-Jackson (WCC)	AWG 2003 (gold); WCC 2003 (10th)
2003–04	Lee Dong-keun	Park Jae-cheol	Ko Seung-wan	Choi Min-suk	Kim Hyun-chul	Yang Young-sun	PCC 2003 (bronze)
2006–07	Kim Chang-min	Kim Min-chan	Park Jong-deog	Ko Seung-wan		Kim Kyung-doo	WUG 2007 (5th)
