= Curling at the 2003 Winter Universiade =

Results of a sports competition

- Host city: Tarvisio, Italy
- Arena: Curling Arena
- Dates: January 17–23
- Men's winner: Canada
- Skip: Mike McEwen
- Third: Denni Neufeld
- Second: Sheldon Wettig
- Lead: Nolan Thiessen
- Alternate: Marc Kennedy
- Finalist: Switzerland (Cyril Stutz)
- Women's winner: Russia
- Skip: Olga Jarkova
- Third: Nkeiruka Ezekh
- Second: Yana Nekrasova
- Lead: Anastassia Skoutlan
- Alternate: Anna Rubtsova
- Finalist: Canada (Krista Scharf)

Curling at the 2003 Winter Universiade took place from January 17 to 23 at the Curling Arena in Tarvisio, Italy.

== Men ==
=== Teams ===
| Canada | Czech Republic | Great Britain | Italy | Japan |
|---|---|---|---|---|
| Skip: Mike McEwen; Third: Denni Neufeld; Second: Sheldon Wettig; Lead: Nolan Thiessen; Alternate: Marc Kennedy | Skip: Petr Stepanek; Third: Jirí Snítil; Second: Petr Firt; Lead: Marek David; Alternate: Radek Bohac | Skip: Paul Stevenson; Third: Iain Kilgour; Second: Fraser Watt; Lead: Gavin Baird; Alternate: David Owen | Skip: Joël Retornaz; Third: Mathias Retornaz; Second: Christian Corona; Lead: Andrea Callegari; Alternate: Alessandro Federici | Skip: Kazuhito Hori; Third: Hiroshi Tsuruga; Second: Hirotoshi Yamaguchi; Lead: Takayuki Doi; Alternate: Shigenori Suzuki |
| Norway | Russia | South Korea | Switzerland | United States |
| Skip: Øystein Sørum; Third: Thomas Løvold; Second: Petter Moe; Lead: Hallvard Sørum | Skip: Vadim Stebakov; Third: Pavel Makoukha; Second: Nikolay Makarov; Lead: Mikhail Fokin; Alternate: Konstantin Doroshenko | Skip: Lee Dong-keun; Third: Park Jae-cheol; Second: Kim Soo-hyuk; Lead: Choi Min-suk; Alternate: Ko Seung-wan | Skip: Cyril Stutz; Third: Urs Eichhorn; Second: Christian Haller; Lead: Yves Hess; Alternate: Reto Herger | Skip: Joey Bonfoey; Third: Kevin Deeren; Second: Robert Johansen; Lead: Joel Dietz |

=== Round-robin standings ===
Key
| Teams to Playoffs |

| Country | Skip | W | L |
|---|---|---|---|
| South Korea | Lee Dong-keun | 7 | 2 |
| United Kingdom | Paul Stevenson | 6 | 3 |
| Canada | Mike McEwen | 6 | 3 |
| Switzerland | Cyril Stutz | 6 | 3 |
| Japan | Kazuhito Hori | 5 | 4 |
| United States | Joey Bonfoey | 4 | 5 |
| Norway | Øystein Sørum | 3 | 6 |
| Czech Republic | Petr Stepanek | 3 | 6 |
| Italy | Joël Retornaz | 3 | 6 |
| Russia | Vadim Stebakov | 2 | 7 |

=== Round-robin results ===
==== Draw 1 ====
Friday, January 17, 10:00

| Sheet A | 1 | 2 | 3 | 4 | 5 | 6 | 7 | 8 | Final |
| Canada (McEwen) | 0 | 0 | 2 | 0 | 0 | 4 | 0 | 0 | 6 |
| United States (Bonfoey) 🔨 | 1 | 0 | 0 | 0 | 1 | 0 | 2 | 1 | 5 |

| Sheet B | 1 | 2 | 3 | 4 | 5 | 6 | 7 | 8 | Final |
| Czech Republic (Stepanek) | 0 | 0 | 0 | 0 | 2 | 0 | 2 | 0 | 4 |
| Switzerland (Stutz) 🔨 | 0 | 1 | 2 | 1 | 0 | 2 | 0 | 0 | 6 |

| Sheet C | 1 | 2 | 3 | 4 | 5 | 6 | 7 | 8 | Final |
| Russia (Stebakov) | 2 | 1 | 0 | 0 | 1 | 0 | 2 | 0 | 6 |
| South Korea (Lee) 🔨 | 0 | 0 | 2 | 1 | 0 | 4 | 0 | 2 | 9 |

| Sheet D | 1 | 2 | 3 | 4 | 5 | 6 | 7 | 8 | Final |
| Great Britain (Stevenson) | 1 | 0 | 3 | 0 | 0 | 2 | 0 | 0 | 6 |
| Norway (Sørum) 🔨 | 0 | 1 | 0 | 0 | 1 | 0 | 1 | 1 | 4 |

| Sheet E | 1 | 2 | 3 | 4 | 5 | 6 | 7 | 8 | Final |
| Italy (Retornaz) | 0 | 2 | 1 | 0 | 1 | 1 | 1 | X | 6 |
| Japan (Hori) 🔨 | 1 | 0 | 0 | 1 | 0 | 0 | 0 | X | 2 |

==== Draw 2 ====
Friday, January 17, 19:00

| Sheet A | 1 | 2 | 3 | 4 | 5 | 6 | 7 | 8 | Final |
| Italy (Retornaz) | 0 | 0 | 0 | 0 | 0 | 0 | 2 | 0 | 2 |
| Czech Republic (Stepanek) 🔨 | 0 | 1 | 2 | 1 | 1 | 1 | 0 | 2 | 8 |

| Sheet B | 1 | 2 | 3 | 4 | 5 | 6 | 7 | 8 | Final |
| Russia (Stebakov) | 1 | 0 | 1 | 1 | 0 | 0 | 1 | 0 | 4 |
| Japan (Hori) 🔨 | 0 | 2 | 0 | 0 | 2 | 1 | 0 | 1 | 6 |

| Sheet C | 1 | 2 | 3 | 4 | 5 | 6 | 7 | 8 | Final |
| Canada (McEwen) 🔨 | 1 | 0 | 1 | 0 | 0 | 1 | 0 | 0 | 3 |
| Great Britain (Stevenson) | 0 | 1 | 0 | 0 | 1 | 0 | 1 | 1 | 4 |

| Sheet D | 1 | 2 | 3 | 4 | 5 | 6 | 7 | 8 | Final |
| South Korea (Lee) | 0 | 1 | 1 | 3 | 0 | 0 | 0 | 0 | 5 |
| United States (Bonfoey) 🔨 | 0 | 0 | 0 | 0 | 1 | 2 | 1 | 0 | 4 |

| Sheet E | 1 | 2 | 3 | 4 | 5 | 6 | 7 | 8 | Final |
| Switzerland (Stutz) 🔨 | 0 | 1 | 0 | 3 | 3 | 0 | 2 | X | 9 |
| Norway (Sørum) | 0 | 0 | 1 | 0 | 0 | 3 | 0 | X | 4 |

==== Draw 3 ====
Saturday, January 18, 13:30

| Sheet A | 1 | 2 | 3 | 4 | 5 | 6 | 7 | 8 | Final |
| Norway (Sørum) 🔨 | 0 | 1 | 0 | 1 | 0 | 1 | 1 | 0 | 4 |
| Japan (Hori) | 1 | 0 | 2 | 0 | 1 | 0 | 0 | 2 | 6 |

| Sheet B | 1 | 2 | 3 | 4 | 5 | 6 | 7 | 8 | Final |
| United States (Bonfoey) | 0 | 1 | 0 | 2 | 2 | 2 | 2 | X | 9 |
| Great Britain (Stevenson) 🔨 | 2 | 0 | 0 | 0 | 0 | 0 | 0 | X | 2 |

| Sheet C | 1 | 2 | 3 | 4 | 5 | 6 | 7 | 8 | 9 | Final |
| Switzerland (Stutz) | 0 | 0 | 1 | 0 | 2 | 0 | 3 | 0 | 1 | 7 |
| Italy (Retornaz) 🔨 | 1 | 0 | 0 | 3 | 0 | 1 | 0 | 1 | 0 | 6 |

| Sheet D | 1 | 2 | 3 | 4 | 5 | 6 | 7 | 8 | Final |
| Russia (Stebakov) 🔨 | 0 | 0 | 1 | 0 | 1 | 0 | 0 | X | 2 |
| Canada (McEwen) | 1 | 3 | 0 | 3 | 0 | 2 | 2 | X | 11 |

| Sheet E | 1 | 2 | 3 | 4 | 5 | 6 | 7 | 8 | 9 | Final |
| South Korea (Lee) 🔨 | 1 | 0 | 1 | 0 | 2 | 0 | 2 | 0 | 1 | 7 |
| Czech Republic (Stepanek) | 0 | 1 | 0 | 2 | 0 | 2 | 0 | 1 | 0 | 6 |

==== Draw 4 ====
Sunday, January 19, 9:00

| Sheet A | 1 | 2 | 3 | 4 | 5 | 6 | 7 | 8 | Final |
| United States (Bonfoey) 🔨 | 1 | 0 | 0 | 2 | 0 | 1 | 0 | X | 4 |
| Switzerland (Stutz) | 0 | 0 | 5 | 0 | 3 | 0 | 2 | X | 10 |

| Sheet B | 1 | 2 | 3 | 4 | 5 | 6 | 7 | 8 | Final |
| South Korea (Lee) | 0 | 0 | 2 | 0 | 2 | 0 | 0 | X | 4 |
| Canada (McEwen) 🔨 | 1 | 2 | 0 | 1 | 0 | 3 | 1 | X | 8 |

| Sheet C | 1 | 2 | 3 | 4 | 5 | 6 | 7 | 8 | Final |
| Japan (Hori) | 0 | 3 | 0 | 4 | 1 | 1 | 1 | X | 10 |
| Czech Republic (Stepanek) 🔨 | 1 | 0 | 2 | 0 | 0 | 0 | 0 | X | 3 |

| Sheet D | 1 | 2 | 3 | 4 | 5 | 6 | 7 | 8 | Final |
| Norway (Sørum) | 0 | 3 | 0 | 4 | 1 | 1 | 1 | X | 10 |
| Italy (Retornaz) 🔨 | 1 | 0 | 2 | 0 | 0 | 0 | 0 | X | 3 |

| Sheet E | 1 | 2 | 3 | 4 | 5 | 6 | 7 | 8 | Final |
| Great Britain (Stevenson) | 0 | 1 | 0 | 1 | 0 | 3 | 0 | 0 | 5 |
| Russia (Stebakov) 🔨 | 0 | 0 | 1 | 0 | 1 | 0 | 1 | 1 | 4 |

==== Draw 5 ====
Sunday, January 19, 18:00

| Sheet A | 1 | 2 | 3 | 4 | 5 | 6 | 7 | 8 | Final |
| South Korea (Lee) 🔨 | 1 | 0 | 0 | 0 | 3 | 0 | 2 | 0 | 6 |
| Italy (Retornaz) | 0 | 0 | 1 | 1 | 0 | 2 | 0 | 1 | 5 |

| Sheet B | 1 | 2 | 3 | 4 | 5 | 6 | 7 | 8 | Final |
| Switzerland (Stutz) 🔨 | 1 | 0 | 2 | 1 | 1 | 0 | 1 | 0 | 6 |
| Russia (Stebakov) | 0 | 0 | 0 | 0 | 0 | 2 | 0 | 2 | 4 |

| Sheet C | 1 | 2 | 3 | 4 | 5 | 6 | 7 | 8 | Final |
| United States (Bonfoey) | 0 | 0 | 0 | 4 | 1 | 2 | X | X | 7 |
| Norway (Sørum) 🔨 | 1 | 1 | 0 | 0 | 0 | 0 | X | X | 2 |

| Sheet D | 1 | 2 | 3 | 4 | 5 | 6 | 7 | 8 | Final |
| Czech Republic (Stepanek) | 0 | 0 | 1 | 0 | 0 | 0 | 1 | X | 2 |
| Great Britain (Stevenson) 🔨 | 2 | 1 | 0 | 1 | 1 | 1 | 0 | X | 6 |

| Sheet E | 1 | 2 | 3 | 4 | 5 | 6 | 7 | 8 | Final |
| Japan (Hori) 🔨 | 0 | 1 | 1 | 0 | 0 | 0 | 1 | 0 | 3 |
| Canada (McEwen) | 0 | 0 | 0 | 2 | 1 | 1 | 0 | 1 | 5 |

==== Draw 6 ====
Monday, January 20, 13:30

| Sheet A | 1 | 2 | 3 | 4 | 5 | 6 | 7 | 8 | Final |
| Japan (Hori) | 0 | 1 | 0 | 1 | 0 | 0 | X | X | 2 |
| Great Britain (Stevenson) 🔨 | 1 | 0 | 3 | 0 | 1 | 4 | X | X | 9 |

| Sheet B | 1 | 2 | 3 | 4 | 5 | 6 | 7 | 8 | Final |
| Canada (McEwen) 🔨 | 0 | 0 | 1 | 1 | 0 | 1 | 0 | 0 | 3 |
| Norway (Sørum) | 1 | 1 | 0 | 0 | 1 | 0 | 0 | 1 | 4 |

| Sheet C | 1 | 2 | 3 | 4 | 5 | 6 | 7 | 8 | Final |
| Czech Republic (Stepanek) | 0 | 1 | 0 | 0 | 1 | 1 | 0 | 0 | 3 |
| Russia (Stebakov) 🔨 | 0 | 0 | 2 | 1 | 0 | 0 | 0 | 2 | 5 |

| Sheet D | 1 | 2 | 3 | 4 | 5 | 6 | 7 | 8 | Final |
| Switzerland (Stutz) | 0 | 1 | 0 | 0 | 0 | 4 | 0 | 2 | 7 |
| South Korea (Lee) 🔨 | 1 | 0 | 1 | 1 | 1 | 0 | 2 | 0 | 6 |

| Sheet E | 1 | 2 | 3 | 4 | 5 | 6 | 7 | 8 | Final |
| United States (Bonfoey) 🔨 | 2 | 0 | 3 | 4 | 0 | 0 | X | X | 9 |
| Italy (Retornaz) | 0 | 1 | 0 | 0 | 0 | 2 | X | X | 3 |

==== Draw 7 ====
Tuesday, January 21, 9:00

| Sheet A | 1 | 2 | 3 | 4 | 5 | 6 | 7 | 8 | Final |
| Czech Republic (Stepanek) 🔨 | 1 | 0 | 0 | 0 | 0 | 0 | 1 | 0 | 2 |
| Canada (McEwen) | 0 | 0 | 0 | 0 | 1 | 2 | 0 | 2 | 5 |

| Sheet B | 1 | 2 | 3 | 4 | 5 | 6 | 7 | 8 | Final |
| Japan (Hori) 🔨 | 1 | 1 | 0 | 0 | 1 | 0 | 0 | 1 | 4 |
| United States (Bonfoey) | 0 | 0 | 1 | 1 | 0 | 1 | 0 | 0 | 3 |

| Sheet C | 1 | 2 | 3 | 4 | 5 | 6 | 7 | 8 | Final |
| Great Britain (Stevenson) | 0 | 2 | 0 | 1 | 0 | 0 | 0 | 2 | 5 |
| Switzerland (Stutz) 🔨 | 0 | 0 | 2 | 0 | 1 | 1 | 0 | 0 | 4 |

| Sheet D | 1 | 2 | 3 | 4 | 5 | 6 | 7 | 8 | Final |
| Italy (Retornaz) 🔨 | 4 | 1 | 0 | 1 | 0 | 1 | 0 | 0 | 7 |
| Russia (Stebakov) | 0 | 0 | 2 | 0 | 1 | 0 | 0 | 1 | 4 |

| Sheet E | 1 | 2 | 3 | 4 | 5 | 6 | 7 | 8 | Final |
| Norway (Sørum) 🔨 | 0 | 1 | 0 | 0 | 0 | 0 | 1 | 2 | 4 |
| South Korea (Lee) | 2 | 0 | 0 | 1 | 0 | 2 | 0 | 0 | 5 |

==== Draw 8 ====
Tuesday, January 21, 18:00

| Sheet A | 1 | 2 | 3 | 4 | 5 | 6 | 7 | 8 | Final |
| Russia (Stebakov) 🔨 | 1 | 0 | 0 | 0 | 1 | 0 | 1 | 1 | 4 |
| Norway (Sørum) | 0 | 0 | 3 | 0 | 0 | 0 | 0 | 0 | 3 |

| Sheet B | 1 | 2 | 3 | 4 | 5 | 6 | 7 | 8 | Final |
| Great Britain (Stevenson) | 0 | 0 | 0 | 2 | 0 | 1 | 0 | 1 | 4 |
| Italy (Retornaz) 🔨 | 1 | 0 | 1 | 0 | 2 | 0 | 1 | 0 | 5 |

| Sheet C | 1 | 2 | 3 | 4 | 5 | 6 | 7 | 8 | Final |
| South Korea (Lee) 🔨 | 1 | 0 | 1 | 1 | 0 | 0 | 2 | 0 | 5 |
| Japan (Hori) | 0 | 0 | 0 | 0 | 2 | 1 | 0 | 3 | 6 |

| Sheet D | 1 | 2 | 3 | 4 | 5 | 6 | 7 | 8 | Final |
| United States (Bonfoey) | 0 | 0 | 0 | 0 | 0 | 2 | X | X | 2 |
| Czech Republic (Stepanek) 🔨 | 2 | 1 | 3 | 2 | 1 | 0 | X | X | 9 |

| Sheet E | 1 | 2 | 3 | 4 | 5 | 6 | 7 | 8 | Final |
| Canada (McEwen) | 0 | 0 | 2 | 2 | 0 | 0 | 3 | 0 | 7 |
| Switzerland (Stutz) 🔨 | 1 | 1 | 0 | 0 | 1 | 0 | 0 | 0 | 3 |

==== Draw 9 ====
Wednesday, January 22, 9:00

| Sheet A | 1 | 2 | 3 | 4 | 5 | 6 | 7 | 8 | Final |
| Great Britain (Stevenson) 🔨 | 1 | 0 | 0 | 0 | 2 | 0 | X | X | 3 |
| South Korea (Lee) | 0 | 0 | 4 | 4 | 0 | 3 | X | X | 11 |

| Sheet B | 1 | 2 | 3 | 4 | 5 | 6 | 7 | 8 | Final |
| Norway (Sørum) 🔨 | 1 | 0 | 3 | 0 | 2 | 0 | 2 | 3 | 11 |
| Czech Republic (Stepanek) | 0 | 1 | 0 | 2 | 0 | 3 | 0 | 0 | 6 |

| Sheet C | 1 | 2 | 3 | 4 | 5 | 6 | 7 | 8 | Final |
| Italy (Retornaz) | 0 | 0 | 1 | 0 | 2 | 0 | 1 | 1 | 5 |
| Canada (McEwen) 🔨 | 1 | 1 | 0 | 2 | 0 | 3 | 0 | 0 | 7 |

| Sheet D | 1 | 2 | 3 | 4 | 5 | 6 | 7 | 8 | Final |
| Japan (Hori) 🔨 | 1 | 0 | 1 | 1 | 2 | 0 | 2 | 0 | 7 |
| Switzerland (Stutz) | 0 | 1 | 0 | 0 | 0 | 2 | 0 | 1 | 4 |

| Sheet E | 1 | 2 | 3 | 4 | 5 | 6 | 7 | 8 | Final |
| Russia (Stebakov) | 0 | 1 | 0 | 0 | 0 | 1 | 0 | 0 | 2 |
| United States (Bonfoey) 🔨 | 2 | 0 | 2 | 2 | 1 | 0 | 0 | 2 | 9 |

=== Playoffs ===
Semifinals
1 | South Korea | 4
4 | Switzerland | 5
3 | Canada | 6
2 | Great Britain | 4

Gold Medal Game
4 | Switzerland | 4
3 | Canada | 6
Bronze Medal Game
1 | South Korea | 6
2 | Great Britain | 4

==== Semifinals ====
Thursday, January 23, 10:00

| Sheet B | 1 | 2 | 3 | 4 | 5 | 6 | 7 | 8 | Final |
| Canada (McEwen) 🔨 | 1 | 0 | 0 | 3 | 1 | 0 | 0 | 1 | 6 |
| Great Britain (Stevenson) | 0 | 1 | 1 | 0 | 0 | 2 | 0 | 0 | 4 |

| Sheet E | 1 | 2 | 3 | 4 | 5 | 6 | 7 | 8 | 9 | Final |
| Switzerland (Stutz) | 0 | 0 | 2 | 0 | 1 | 0 | 1 | 0 | 1 | 5 |
| South Korea (Lee) 🔨 | 0 | 1 | 0 | 2 | 0 | 0 | 0 | 1 | 0 | 4 |

==== Bronze Medal Game ====
Thursday, January 23, 15:30

| Sheet C | 1 | 2 | 3 | 4 | 5 | 6 | 7 | 8 | Final |
| South Korea (Lee) 🔨 | 0 | 3 | 0 | 1 | 1 | 0 | 1 | 0 | 6 |
| Great Britain (Stevenson) | 2 | 0 | 1 | 0 | 0 | 1 | 0 | 0 | 4 |

==== Gold Medal Game ====
Thursday, January 23, 15:30

| Sheet C | 1 | 2 | 3 | 4 | 5 | 6 | 7 | 8 | Final |
| Switzerland (Stutz) | 0 | 0 | 0 | 2 | 0 | 1 | 0 | 1 | 4 |
| Canada (McEwen) | 0 | 0 | 1 | 0 | 3 | 0 | 2 | 0 | 6 |

== Women ==
=== Teams ===
| Canada | Germany | Japan | Norway |
|---|---|---|---|
| Skip: Krista Scharf; Third: Amy Stachiw; Second: Laura Armitage; Lead: Margaret Carr | Skip: Cornelia Stock; Third: Andrea Stock; Second: Katja Weisser; Lead: Sabine Freiss | Skip: Ayumi Sekiguti; Third: Tika Nakatu; Second: Mizuka Mitsui; Lead: Tomoko Kojima; Alternate: Yuuko Miyazaki | Skip: Linn Githmark; Third: Marianne Rørvik; Second: Charlotte Hovring; Lead: Henriette Wang |
| Russia | South Korea | Switzerland | United States |
| Skip: Olga Jarkova; Third: Nkeiruka Ezekh; Second: Yana Nekrasova; Lead: Anastasia Skoultan; Alternate: Anna Rubtsova | Skip: Kim Mi-yeon; Third: Park Ji-hyun; Second: Shin Mi-sung; Lead: Lee Hyun-jung; Alternate: Park Kyung-mi | Skip: Nadja Heuer; Third: Sybil Bachofen; Second: Andrea Ulrich; Lead: Vera Heuer; Alternate: Miriam Wymann | Skip: Laura Delaney; Third: Hope Schmitt; Second: Kaitlyn Schmitt; Lead: Kirsten Finch |

=== Round-robin standings ===
Key
| Teams to Playoffs |

| Country | Skip | W | L |
|---|---|---|---|
| Russia | Olga Jarkova | 5 | 2 |
| Norway | Linn Githmark | 5 | 2 |
| Canada | Krista Scharf | 5 | 2 |
| Switzerland | Nadja Heuer | 4 | 3 |
| South Korea | Kim Mi-yeon | 3 | 4 |
| Germany | Cornelia Stock | 3 | 4 |
| United States | Laura Delaney | 2 | 5 |
| Japan | Ayumi Sekiguti | 1 | 6 |

=== Round-robin results ===
==== Draw 1 ====
Friday, January 17, 14:30

| Sheet A | 1 | 2 | 3 | 4 | 5 | 6 | 7 | 8 | Final |
| Canada (Scharf) 🔨 | 0 | 2 | 0 | 0 | 0 | 2 | 0 | 1 | 5 |
| Germany (Stock) | 2 | 0 | 1 | 2 | 0 | 0 | 1 | 0 | 6 |

| Sheet B | 1 | 2 | 3 | 4 | 5 | 6 | 7 | 8 | 9 | Final |
| Japan (Sekiguti) 🔨 | 1 | 1 | 1 | 0 | 5 | 0 | 0 | 0 | 1 | 9 |
| South Korea (Kim) | 0 | 0 | 0 | 2 | 0 | 3 | 2 | 1 | 0 | 8 |

| Sheet C | 1 | 2 | 3 | 4 | 5 | 6 | 7 | 8 | Final |
| Norway (Githmark) | 0 | 0 | 0 | 2 | 0 | 1 | 0 | 0 | 3 |
| Russia (Jarkova) 🔨 | 0 | 1 | 1 | 0 | 2 | 0 | 2 | 1 | 7 |

| Sheet D | 1 | 2 | 3 | 4 | 5 | 6 | 7 | 8 | Final |
| Switzerland (Heuer) 🔨 | 1 | 0 | 0 | 1 | 0 | 0 | 2 | 0 | 4 |
| United States (Delaney) | 0 | 1 | 1 | 0 | 2 | 3 | 0 | 1 | 8 |

==== Draw 2 ====
Saturday, January 18, 9:00

| Sheet A | 1 | 2 | 3 | 4 | 5 | 6 | 7 | 8 | Final |
| Russia (Jarkova) | 0 | 1 | 2 | 2 | 0 | 2 | 4 | X | 11 |
| United States (Delaney) 🔨 | 1 | 0 | 0 | 0 | 1 | 0 | 0 | X | 2 |

| Sheet B | 1 | 2 | 3 | 4 | 5 | 6 | 7 | 8 | Final |
| Norway (Githmark) 🔨 | 0 | 2 | 1 | 3 | 0 | 1 | 0 | 0 | 7 |
| Switzerland (Heuer) | 0 | 0 | 0 | 0 | 1 | 0 | 2 | 1 | 4 |

| Sheet C | 1 | 2 | 3 | 4 | 5 | 6 | 7 | 8 | Final |
| Germany (Stock) 🔨 | 0 | 0 | 1 | 0 | 1 | 0 | 0 | 2 | 4 |
| South Korea (Kim) | 1 | 1 | 0 | 1 | 0 | 2 | 1 | 0 | 6 |

| Sheet D | 1 | 2 | 3 | 4 | 5 | 6 | 7 | 8 | Final |
| Canada (Scharf) | 0 | 0 | 2 | 3 | 0 | 4 | 0 | X | 9 |
| Japan (Sekiguti) 🔨 | 2 | 2 | 0 | 0 | 0 | 0 | 0 | X | 4 |

==== Draw 3 ====
Saturday, January 18, 18:00

| Sheet A | 1 | 2 | 3 | 4 | 5 | 6 | 7 | 8 | Final |
| Norway (Githmark) | 1 | 1 | 0 | 0 | 2 | 0 | 0 | 1 | 5 |
| South Korea (Kim) 🔨 | 0 | 0 | 1 | 2 | 0 | 2 | 1 | 0 | 6 |

| Sheet B | 1 | 2 | 3 | 4 | 5 | 6 | 7 | 8 | Final |
| Canada (Scharf) 🔨 | 3 | 0 | 3 | 0 | 0 | 0 | 1 | 0 | 7 |
| United States (Delaney) | 0 | 1 | 0 | 0 | 1 | 2 | 0 | 1 | 5 |

| Sheet C | 1 | 2 | 3 | 4 | 5 | 6 | 7 | 8 | Final |
| Switzerland (Heuer) 🔨 | 4 | 1 | 0 | 3 | 0 | 0 | X | X | 8 |
| Japan (Sekiguti) | 0 | 0 | 1 | 0 | 0 | 1 | X | X | 2 |

| Sheet D | 1 | 2 | 3 | 4 | 5 | 6 | 7 | 8 | Final |
| Germany (Stock) | 0 | 0 | 2 | 0 | 0 | 0 | X | X | 2 |
| Russia (Jarkova) 🔨 | 0 | 2 | 0 | 5 | 2 | 1 | X | X | 10 |

==== Draw 4 ====
Sunday, January 19, 13:30

| Sheet A | 1 | 2 | 3 | 4 | 5 | 6 | 7 | 8 | Final |
| Japan (Sekiguti) | 0 | 0 | 0 | 1 | 0 | 0 | 1 | X | 2 |
| Russia (Jarkova) 🔨 | 0 | 0 | 2 | 0 | 2 | 3 | 0 | X | 7 |

| Sheet B | 1 | 2 | 3 | 4 | 5 | 6 | 7 | 8 | Final |
| Switzerland (Heuer) | 0 | 4 | 2 | 0 | 1 | 1 | 1 | X | 9 |
| Germany (Stock) 🔨 | 2 | 0 | 0 | 2 | 0 | 0 | 0 | X | 4 |

| Sheet C | 1 | 2 | 3 | 4 | 5 | 6 | 7 | 8 | 9 | Final |
| Canada (Scharf) 🔨 | 1 | 1 | 0 | 4 | 1 | 0 | 0 | 0 | 0 | 7 |
| Norway (Githmark) | 0 | 0 | 3 | 0 | 0 | 2 | 1 | 1 | 2 | 9 |

| Sheet D | 1 | 2 | 3 | 4 | 5 | 6 | 7 | 8 | Final |
| United States (Delaney) 🔨 | 1 | 1 | 0 | 1 | 0 | 2 | 0 | 0 | 5 |
| South Korea (Kim) | 0 | 0 | 2 | 0 | 1 | 0 | 3 | 1 | 7 |

==== Draw 5 ====
Monday, January 20, 9:00

| Sheet A | 1 | 2 | 3 | 4 | 5 | 6 | 7 | 8 | Final |
| Switzerland (Heuer) 🔨 | 1 | 1 | 0 | 0 | 0 | 1 | 0 | 1 | 4 |
| Canada (Scharf) | 0 | 0 | 2 | 2 | 1 | 0 | 2 | 0 | 7 |

| Sheet B | 1 | 2 | 3 | 4 | 5 | 6 | 7 | 8 | Final |
| South Korea (Kim) 🔨 | 1 | 0 | 0 | 0 | 0 | 2 | 0 | 1 | 4 |
| Russia (Jarkova) | 0 | 2 | 1 | 1 | 1 | 0 | 2 | 0 | 7 |

| Sheet C | 1 | 2 | 3 | 4 | 5 | 6 | 7 | 8 | Final |
| Japan (Sekiguti) 🔨 | 0 | 1 | 0 | 0 | 0 | 0 | 1 | 0 | 2 |
| United States (Delaney) | 1 | 0 | 1 | 1 | 0 | 0 | 0 | 0 | 3 |

| Sheet D | 1 | 2 | 3 | 4 | 5 | 6 | 7 | 8 | Final |
| Norway (Githmark) 🔨 | 0 | 1 | 2 | 0 | 0 | 3 | 1 | 1 | 8 |
| Germany (Stock) | 2 | 0 | 0 | 0 | 1 | 0 | 0 | 0 | 3 |

==== Draw 6 ====
Monday, January 20, 18:00

| Sheet A | 1 | 2 | 3 | 4 | 5 | 6 | 7 | 8 | Final |
| Germany (Stock) | 1 | 0 | 3 | 1 | 1 | 0 | 0 | 1 | 7 |
| Japan (Sekiguti) 🔨 | 0 | 2 | 0 | 0 | 0 | 1 | 1 | 0 | 4 |

| Sheet B | 1 | 2 | 3 | 4 | 5 | 6 | 7 | 8 | Final |
| United States (Delaney) 🔨 | 0 | 1 | 0 | 2 | 0 | 0 | X | X | 3 |
| Norway (Githmark) | 3 | 0 | 2 | 0 | 4 | 4 | X | X | 13 |

| Sheet C | 1 | 2 | 3 | 4 | 5 | 6 | 7 | 8 | Final |
| South Korea (Kim) | 0 | 0 | 0 | 2 | 0 | 2 | 0 | 0 | 4 |
| Canada (Scharf) 🔨 | 0 | 1 | 1 | 0 | 1 | 0 | 1 | 1 | 5 |

| Sheet D | 1 | 2 | 3 | 4 | 5 | 6 | 7 | 8 | Final |
| Russia (Jarkova) | 0 | 1 | 0 | 0 | 1 | 0 | 1 | 0 | 3 |
| Switzerland (Heuer) 🔨 | 1 | 0 | 1 | 0 | 0 | 2 | 0 | 0 | 4 |

==== Draw 7 ====
Tuesday, January 21, 13:30

| Sheet A | 1 | 2 | 3 | 4 | 5 | 6 | 7 | 8 | Final |
| South Korea (Kim) 🔨 | 1 | 0 | 1 | 0 | 0 | 0 | 0 | X | 2 |
| Switzerland (Heuer) | 0 | 1 | 0 | 3 | 0 | 2 | 1 | X | 7 |

| Sheet B | 1 | 2 | 3 | 4 | 5 | 6 | 7 | 8 | Final |
| Russia (Jarkova) 🔨 | 1 | 0 | 0 | 3 | 0 | 0 | 1 | 0 | 5 |
| Canada (Scharf) | 0 | 1 | 1 | 0 | 2 | 1 | 0 | 3 | 8 |

| Sheet C | 1 | 2 | 3 | 4 | 5 | 6 | 7 | 8 | Final |
| United States (Delaney) | 0 | 1 | 0 | 0 | 1 | 0 | 4 | 0 | 6 |
| Germany (Stock) 🔨 | 1 | 0 | 2 | 2 | 0 | 2 | 0 | 0 | 7 |

| Sheet D | 1 | 2 | 3 | 4 | 5 | 6 | 7 | 8 | Final |
| Japan (Sekiguti) | 0 | 1 | 0 | 0 | 1 | 1 | 0 | 0 | 3 |
| Norway (Githmark) 🔨 | 2 | 0 | 1 | 2 | 0 | 0 | 1 | 1 | 7 |

=== Playoffs ===
Semifinals
1 | Russia | 6
4 | Switzerland | 4
3 | Canada | 5
2 | Norway | 0

Gold Medal Game
1 | Russia | 11
3 | Canada | 2
Bronze Medal Game
4 | Switzerland | 3
2 | Norway | 5

==== Semifinals ====
Thursday, January 23, 10:00

| Sheet A | 1 | 2 | 3 | 4 | 5 | 6 | 7 | 8 | Final |
| Norway (Githmark) | 0 | 0 | 0 | 0 | 0 | 0 | 0 | 0 | 0 |
| Canada (Scharf) 🔨 | 0 | 0 | 0 | 1 | 0 | 1 | 2 | 1 | 5 |

| Sheet B | 1 | 2 | 3 | 4 | 5 | 6 | 7 | 8 | Final |
| Russia (Jarkova) 🔨 | 0 | 2 | 0 | 1 | 0 | 0 | 1 | 2 | 6 |
| Switzerland (Heuer) | 0 | 0 | 1 | 0 | 2 | 1 | 0 | 0 | 4 |

==== Bronze Medal Game ====
Thursday, January 23, 15:30

| Sheet A | 1 | 2 | 3 | 4 | 5 | 6 | 7 | 8 | Final |
| Switzerland (Heuer) 🔨 | 1 | 0 | 0 | 1 | 0 | 1 | 0 | 0 | 3 |
| Norway (Githmark) | 0 | 0 | 0 | 0 | 2 | 0 | 1 | 2 | 5 |

==== Gold Medal Game ====
Thursday, January 23, 15:30

| Sheet B | 1 | 2 | 3 | 4 | 5 | 6 | 7 | 8 | Final |
| Russia (Jarkova) 🔨 | 0 | 2 | 2 | 0 | 4 | 3 | X | X | 11 |
| Canada (Scharf) | 0 | 0 | 0 | 2 | 0 | 0 | X | X | 2 |
