= Park Jae-cheol =

South Korean curler and coach

- Curler ♂
- Born: October 24, 1975 (age 51)

Team
- Curling club: Gyeong-buk CC, Gyeongbuk

Curling career
- Member Association: South Korea
- World Championship: 1 (2003)
- Pacific-Asia Championship: 4 (1998, 2001, 2002, 2003)
- Other appearances: Winter Universiade: 1 (2003), Asian Winter Games: 1 (2003)
Medal record
Curling
Pacific-Asia Championships
Gold medal – first place	2002 Queenstown
Bronze medal – third place	2003 Aomori
Asian Winter Games
Gold medal – first place	2003 Aomori
Winter Universiade
Bronze medal – third place	2003 Tarvisio

Park Jae-cheol (born October 24, 1975) is a South Korean male curler and curling coach.

At the international level, he is a 2002 Pacific champion curler, 2003 Pacific bronze medallist, 2007 Asian Winter Games champion curler and 2003 Winter Universiade bronze medallist.

== Teams ==
Season	Skip	Third	Second	Lead	Alternate	Coach	Events
1998–99	Song He-dong	Kim Chang-min	Park Jae-cheol	Kim Su-hong	Jeong Tac-yeon		PCC 1998 (4th)
2001–02	Lee Dong-keun	Kim Soo-hyuk	Choi Min-suk	Park Jae-cheol	Hong Jun-pyo	Glen Jackson	PCC 2001 (4th)
2002–03	Lee Dong-keun	Park Jae-cheol	Kim Soo-hyuk	Choi Min-suk	Ko Seung-wan	Yang Young-sun	WUG 2003 (bronze)
2002–03	Lee Dong-keun	Park Jae-cheol	Ko Seung-wan	Choi Min-suk	Kim Soo-hyuk	Melissa Soligo	PCC 2002 (gold)
2002–03	Lee Dong-keun	Kim Soo-hyuk	Park Jae-cheol	Choi Min-suk	Ko Seung-wan	Elaine Dagg-Jackson (WCC)	AWG 2003 (gold); WCC 2003 (10th)
2003–04	Lee Dong-keun	Park Jae-cheol	Ko Seung-wan	Choi Min-suk	Kim Hyun-chul	Yang Young-sun	PCC 2003 (bronze)

== Record as a coach of national teams ==
Year	Tournament, event	National team	Place
2006	2006 Pacific Curling Championships	South Korea (women)	2nd place, silver medalist(s)
2007	2007 Winter Universiade	South Korea (junior women)	7
2007	2007 Pacific Curling Championships	South Korea (men)	5
2009	2009 Winter Universiade	South Korea (junior women)	7
2015	2015 Pacific-Asia Junior Curling Championships	South Korea (junior women)	1st place, gold medalist(s)
2015	2015 World Junior Curling Championships	South Korea (junior women)	6
