= 2002 Pacific Curling Championships =

- Host city: Queenstown, New Zealand
- Dates: November 4–10
- Men's winner: South Korea
- Curling club: Gyeong-buk CC
- Skip: Lee Dong-keun
- Third: Park Jae-cheol
- Second: Ko Seung-wan
- Lead: Choi Min-suk
- Alternate: Kim Soo-hyuk
- Coach: Melissa Soligo
- Finalist: Australia (Hugh Millikin)
- Women's winner: Japan
- Curling club: Hokkaido-Kitami Curling Association
- Skip: Shinobu Aota
- Third: Yukari Okazaki
- Second: Eriko Minatoya
- Lead: Kotomi Ishizaki
- Alternate: Satomi Tsujii
- Finalist: South Korea (Kim Mi-yeon)

The 2002 Pacific Curling Championships were held from November 4 to 10 in Queenstown, New Zealand.

South Korea's Lee Dong-keun won the men's event over Australia's Hugh Millikin (it was the first Pacific title for the South Korean men's team). On the women's side, Japan's Shinobu Aota defeated South Korea's Kim Mi-yeon in the final (it was the tenth Pacific title for the Japanese women and the second title for skip Shinobu Aota).

By virtue of winning, the South Korean men's team and the Japanese women's team qualified for the 2003 World Men's and Women's Curling Championships in Winnipeg, Canada.

== Men ==
=== Teams ===
Country	Skip	Third	Second	Lead	Alternate	Coach	Curling club
Australia	Hugh Millikin	Ian Palangio	John Theriault	Stephen Johns	Steve Hewitt		New South Wales CC
China	Xu Xiaoming	Wang Fengchun	Zhu Yu	Liu Rui	Ma Yongjun	Zhang Wei, Tan Weidong	
Chinese Taipei	Justin Hsu	Nicholas Hsu	Evan Lu	Steve Koo			
Japan	Hiroaki Kashiwagi	Kazuto Yanagizawa	Jun Nakayama	Keita Yanagizawa	Takanori Ichimura	Akinori Kashiwagi	Miyota CC
South Korea	Lee Dong-keun	Park Jae-cheol	Ko Seung-wan	Choi Min-suk	Kim Soo-hyuk	Melissa Soligo	Gyeong-buk CC
New Zealand	Sean Becker	Hans Frauenlob	Jim Allan	Lorne De Pape	Dan Mustapic		Ranfurly CC

=== Round robin ===
Place	Country	Skip	(Japan)	(South Korea)	(New Zealand)	(Australia)	(China)	(Chinese Taipei)	Wins	Losses
1	Japan	Hiroaki Kashiwagi	*	7:2; 8:1	7:9; 10:5	4:8; 7:5	10:8; 8:6	8:3; 7:6	8	2
2	South Korea	Lee Dong-keun	2:7; 1:8	*	4:6; 7:4	7:6; 9:4	8:3; 7:4	9:1; 6:5	7	3
3	New Zealand	Sean Becker	9:7; 5:10	6:4; 4:7	*	7:5; 4:8	9:3; 12:4	5:6; 12:1	6	4
4	Australia	Hugh Millikin	8:4; 5:7	6:7; 4:9	5:7; 8:4	*	8:9; 6:4	11:1; 7:3	4	6
5	China	Xu Xiaoming	8:10; 6:8	3:8; 4:7	3:9; 4:12	9:8; 4:6	*	9:4; 11:5	3	7
6	Chinese Taipei	Justin Hsu	3:8; 6:7	1:9; 5:6	6:5; 1:12	1:11; 3:7	4:9; 5:11	*	1	9

Teams to playoffs

=== Playoffs ===
Semifinals
1	Japan	7
4	Australia	8
2	South Korea	9
3	New Zealand	4

Final
Australia	2
South Korea	5

Bronze medal
Japan	8
New Zealand	7

Semifinals

Team	1	2	3	4	5	6	7	8	9	10	Final
Japan (Hiroaki Kashiwagi)	1	0	2	0	1	0	1	1	0	1	7
Australia (Hugh Millikin)	0	1	0	3	0	3	0	0	1	0	8

Team	1	2	3	4	5	6	7	8	9	10	Final
South Korea (Lee Dong-keun)	0	1	0	2	0	2	0	2	0	2	9
New Zealand (Sean Becker)	1	0	1	0	1	0	1	0	0	0	4

Bronze medal game

Team	1	2	3	4	5	6	7	8	9	10	Final
Japan (Hiroaki Kashiwagi)	0	0	1	1	0	2	0	2	1	1	8
New Zealand (Sean Becker)	1	2	0	0	3	0	1	0	0	0	7

Final

Team	1	2	3	4	5	6	7	8	9	10	Final
South Korea (Lee Dong-keun)	1	0	0	1	1	0	2	0	0	0	5
Australia (Hugh Millikin)	0	0	1	0	0	1	0	0	0	0	2

=== Final standings ===
Place	Country	Skip	GP	W	L
1st place, gold medalist(s)	South Korea	Lee Dong-keun	12	9	3
2nd place, silver medalist(s)	Australia	Hugh Millikin	12	6	6
3rd place, bronze medalist(s)	Japan	Hiroaki Kashiwagi	12	9	3
4	New Zealand	Sean Becker	12	6	6
5	China	Xu Xiaoming	10	3	7
6	Chinese Taipei	Justin Hsu	10	1	9

== Women ==
=== Teams ===
Country	Skip	Third	Second	Lead	Alternate	Coach	Curling club
Australia	Helen Wright	Lynn Hewitt	Lyn Greenwood	Ellen Weir	Sandy Gagnon		Victoria Curling Association
China	Yue Qingshuang	Zhou Yan	Zhao Zhenzhen	Zhan Jing	Liu Yin		
Japan	Shinobu Aota	Yukari Okazaki	Eriko Minatoya	Kotomi Ishizaki	Satomi Tsujii		
South Korea	Kim Mi-yeon	Lee Hyun-jung	Shin Mi-sung	Park Ji-hyun	Park Kyung-mi	Elaine Dagg-Jackson, Kim Hyun-kyung	Seoul CC
New Zealand	Bridget Becker	Helen Greer	Natalie Campbell	Kylie Petherick	Catherine Inder	Peter Becker	Ranfurly CC

=== Round robin ===
Place	Country	Skip	(Japan)	(South Korea)	(Australia)	(New Zealand)	(China)	Wins	Losses
1	Japan	Shinobu Aota	*	2:12; 6:5	11:5; 11:4	10:5; 11:1	6:5; 8:3	7	1
2	South Korea	Kim Mi-yeon	12:2; 5:6	*	4:10; 14:2	7:11; 11:2	9:5; 8:4	5	3
3	Australia	Helen Wright	5:11; 4:11	10:4; 2:14	*	10:4; 12:0	14:3; 6:4	5	3
4	New Zealand	Bridget Becker	5:10; 1:11	11:7; 2:11	4:10; 0:12	*	12:6; 10:6	3	5
5	China	Yue Qingshuang	5:6; 3:8	5:9; 4:8	3:14; 4:6	6:12; 6:10	*	0	8

Teams to playoffs

=== Playoffs ===
Semifinals
1	Japan	8
4	New Zealand	3
2	South Korea	9
3	Australia	4

Final
Japan	8
South Korea	3

Bronze medal
'New Zealand	11
Australia	4

Semifinals

Team	1	2	3	4	5	6	7	8	9	10	Final
New Zealand (Bridget Becker)	1	0	0	0	0	1	0	1	0	X	3
Japan (Shinobu Aota)	0	2	1	3	1	0	0	0	1	X	8

Team	1	2	3	4	5	6	7	8	9	10	Final
South Korea (Kim Mi-yeon)	0	1	0	2	0	2	0	2	0	2	9
Australia (Helen Wright)	1	0	1	0	1	0	1	0	0	0	4

Bronze medal game

Team	1	2	3	4	5	6	7	8	9	10	Final
New Zealand (Bridget Becker)	2	0	3	1	1	0	0	3	1	X	11
Australia (Helen Wright)	0	1	0	0	0	2	1	0	0	X	4

Final

Team	1	2	3	4	5	6	7	8	9	10	Final
South Korea (Kim Mi-yeon)	0	0	0	0	1	0	1	0	1	X	3
Japan (Shinobu Aota)	0	1	1	1	0	3	0	2	0	X	8

=== Final standings ===
Place	Country	Skip	GP	W	L
1st place, gold medalist(s)	Japan	Shinobu Aota	10	9	1
2nd place, silver medalist(s)	South Korea	Kim Mi-yeon	10	6	4
3rd place, bronze medalist(s)	New Zealand	Bridget Becker	10	4	6
4	Australia	Helen Wright	10	5	5
5	China	Yue Qingshuang	8	0	8
