= Kim Ji-sun =

South Korean curler (born 1987)

- Curler
- Born: June 27, 1987 (age 39); Seoul, South Korea

Team
- Curling club: Gyeonggi-do CC, Uijeongbu, KOR

Curling career
- Member Association: South Korea
- World Championship: 5 (2009, 2011, 2012, 2014, 2016)
- Pacific-Asia Championship: 4 (2010, 2011, 2013, 2015)
- Olympic: 1 (2014)
Medal record
Women's curling
Representing South Korea
Pacific-Asia Championships
Gold medal – first place	2010 Uiseong
Gold medal – first place	2013 Shanghai
Silver medal – second place	2011 Nanjing
Silver medal – second place	2015 Almaty
Winter Universiade
Silver medal – second place	2013 Trentino
Bronze medal – third place	2011 Erzurum
Representing Gyeonggi
Korean Women's Championship
Gold medal – first place	2011 Uijeongbu
Gold medal – first place	2013 Chuncheon
Gold medal – first place	2015 Icheon
Bronze medal – third place	2012 Uijeongbu
Representing Gangwon
Korean Mixed Doubles Championship
Silver medal – second place	2017 Icheon

- Kim Ji-sun
- Hangul: 김지선
- Hanja: 金智善
- RR: Gim Jiseon
- MR: Kim Chisŏn

Kim Ji-sun (born June 27, 1987) is a South Korean curler from Gyeonggi Province. She was the skip of the 2014 South Korean Olympic Curling Team.

== Career ==
Kim was a member of the silver medal-winning Korean team that won a silver medal at the 2007 Pacific Junior Curling Championships. She was the team's alternate and played two matches. She was also the alternate for the Korean team at the 2009 World Women's Curling Championship that finished tenth. She played just one match in that game, a losing cause to Germany.

As a skip, Kim won the silver medal on 2010 Pacific Curling Championships for Korea. Her Korean team was defeated by the former World Champion Chinese team, skipped by Wang Bingyu, in the final. Later in the season, she led her Korean team to a bronze medal at the 2011 Winter Universiade.

As the reigning Pacific champion, Kim would play in her second World championships at the 2011 Capital One World Women's Curling Championship. The team struggled finishing in last place with a 2–9 record. At the 2012 World Women's Curling Championship, South Korea made history by making the playoffs for the first time with a 8–3 record. They defeated Canada to advance to the semifinal, but lost a close game against eventual champions Switzerland. They then lost another close game to the Canadians in the bronze medal game, finishing in fourth place. Their fourth-place finish ensured them a spot in the 2014 Winter Olympics, even though South Korea did not qualify for the 2013 World Championships. At the Olympics, she led her Korean team to an eighth-place finish and a 3–6 record. A month after the Olympics, Kim and her team represented South Korea at the 2014 World Women's Curling Championship in Saint John, New Brunswick. Like in 2012, the team had a successful run finishing round robin play with an 8–3 record and winning the tiebreaker 7–5 over Sweden's Margaretha Sigfridsson to qualify for the playoffs. They defeated Russia's Anna Sidorova in the 3 vs. 4 game but then lost the semifinal to, once again, Switzerland who went on to win the event. The team's fourth Gim Eun-ji missed her final shot of the bronze medal game and the Russian's stole the win 7–6.

The 2014–15 season was not a good season for the team. They won a World Curling Tour, the Crestwood Ladies Fall Classic but they didn't play in the 2014 Pacific-Asia Curling Championships and South Korea did not qualify for the 2015 World Women's Curling Championship. The 2015–16 season was successful for the team. They won the Hub International Crown of Curling, finished second at the 2015 Pacific-Asia Curling Championships and qualified for the 2016 World Women's Curling Championship. Kim and her team struggled during the World's, finishing in seventh place with a 5–6 record. Kim retired from competitive curling after the season.

== Coaching ==
In 2017, Kim Ji-sun (who speaks fluent Chinese) took up the position of the coach of Shanghai junior team two months after her retirement. In January 2019, she was promoted to the head coach position of the Shanghai team and tasked with overseeing its senior, junior, and youth squads.

== Personal life ==
When she was young, Kim was a speed skater. Kim met Chinese curler Xu Xiaoming in China in 2007 and married him in 2013. She has one son, Su-ho. She attended Dankook University in Cheonan.

== Grand Slam record ==
Key
C	Champion
F	Lost in Final
SF	Lost in Semifinal
QF	Lost in Quarterfinals
R16	Lost in the round of 16
Q	Did not advance to playoffs
T2	Played in Tier 2 event
DNP	Did not participate in event
N/A	Not a Grand Slam event that season

Event	2011–12	2012–13	2013–14	2014–15
Autumn Gold	Q	DNP	DNP	Q
Masters	N/A	DNP	QF	DNP

== Teams ==
Season	Skip	Third	Second	Lead	Alternate
2010–11	Kim Ji-sun	Lee Seul-bee	Shin Mi-sung	Gim Un-chi	Lee Hyun-jung
2011–12	Kim Ji-sun	Lee Seul-bee	Gim Un-chi	Lee Hyun-jung	Shin Mi-sung
2012–13	Kim Ji-sun	Lee Seul-bee	Um Min-ji	Gim Un-chi	
2013–14 (Note: Alternated positions throughout the season.)	Kim Ji-sun	Gim Un-chi	Shin Mi-sung	Lee Seul-bee	Um Min-ji
2014–15	Gim Un-chi	Lee Seul-bee	Um Min-ji	Yeom Yoon-jung	
2015–16	Gim Un-chi (Fourth)	Lee Seul-bee	Um Min-ji	Kim Ji-sun (Skip)	Yeom Yoon-jung
