= 2010 Pacific Curling Championships =

- Host city: Uiseong, South Korea
- Arena: Uiesong County Curling Center
- Dates: November 16–23
- Men's winner: China
- Curling club: Harbin CC, Harbin
- Skip: Wang Fengchun
- Third: Zang Jialiang
- Second: Xu Xiaoming
- Lead: Ba Dexin
- Alternate: Chen Lu'an
- Coach: Zhang Wei
- Finalist: South Korea
- Women's winner: South Korea
- Curling club: Gyeongjgido CC, Gyeonjgido
- Skip: Kim Ji-sun
- Third: Lee Seul-bee
- Second: Shin Mi-sung
- Lead: Gim Un-chi
- Alternate: Lee Hyun-jung
- Coach: Choi Min-suk & Chung Young-sup
- Finalist: China

The 2010 Pacific Curling Championships were held from November 16 to the 23, 2010 in Uiseong, South Korea. The Pacific Championships act as the qualifiers for the 2011 World Curling Championships. The top two women's berths moved on to the 2011 Capital One World Women's Curling Championship in Esbjerg, Denmark, while the top two men's berths moved on to the 2011 Ford World Men's Curling Championship in Regina, Saskatchewan, Canada.

The teams participating in the Pacific Curling Championships first played in a double round-robin where each team played against the other teams twice. The top 4 of each group (men's or women's) moves on to the playoffs. The playoffs include a semifinals round and a finals round. In the semifinals round, the winner is determined with a best-of-five series, the first two games of which are taken from the round robin games. The winners of these best-of-five series then play against each other in the final match.

== Women ==
=== Teams ===
Australia	China	Japan	South Korea	New Zealand
Skip: Kim Forge Third: Laurie Weeden; Second: Lyn Gill; Lead: Madeleine Wilson; Coach: Janice Mori	Skip: Wang Bingyu Third: Liu Yin; Second: Yue Qingshuang; Lead: Liu Sijia; Alternate: Sun Yue; Coach: Tan Weidong	Skip: Mayo Yamaura Third: Shinobu Aota; Second: Anna Ohmiya; Lead: Kotomi Ishizaki; Alternate: Natsuki Saito; Coach: Shinya Abe	Skip: Kim Ji-sun Third: Lee Seul-bee; Second: Shin Mi-sung; Lead: Gim Un-chi; Alternate: Lee Hyun-jung; Coaches: Choi Min-suk, Chung Young-sup	Skip: Brydie Donald Third: Bridget Becker; Second: Marisa Jones; Lead: Natalie Campbell; Alternate: Katie Bauer; Coach: Peter Becker

=== Standings ===
Country	Skip	W	L
China	Wang Bingyu	8	0
South Korea	Kim Ji-Sun	6	2
Japan	Mayo Yamaura	4	4
New Zealand	Brydie Donald	2	6
Australia	Kim Forge	0	8

=== Results ===
==== Draw 1 ====
Tuesday, November 16, 14:30

Sheet A	1	2	3	4	5	6	7	8	9	10	Final
Japan (Yamaura)	3	0	0	0	3	0	2	0	1	X	9
Australia (Forge)	0	1	1	1	0	1	0	2	0	X	6

Sheet C	1	2	3	4	5	6	7	8	9	10	Final
New Zealand (Donald)	1	0	1	0	0	2	0	1	0	X	5
China (Wang)	0	2	0	2	1	0	3	0	1	X	9

==== Draw 2 ====
Wednesday, November 17, 8:00

Sheet C	1	2	3	4	5	6	7	8	9	10	Final
Australia (Forge)	0	0	1	1	1	0	1	1	0	X	5
South Korea (Kim)	3	0	0	0	0	4	0	0	2	X	9

Sheet D	1	2	3	4	5	6	7	8	9	10	Final
Japan (Yamaura)	0	0	0	2	0	2	0	1	0	1	6
China (Wang)	1	0	0	0	2	0	4	0	1	0	8

==== Draw 3 ====
Wednesday, November 17, 16:00

Sheet A	1	2	3	4	5	6	7	8	9	10	Final
South Korea (Kim)	0	1	0	1	0	1	0	0	1	X	4
China (Wang)	1	0	2	0	2	0	1	1	0	X	7

Sheet C	1	2	3	4	5	6	7	8	9	10	Final
Japan (Yamaura)	0	1	1	0	0	0	3	1	0	3	9
New Zealand (Donald)	2	0	0	1	1	1	0	0	2	0	7

==== Draw 4 ====
Thursday, November 18, 10:00

Sheet C	1	2	3	4	5	6	7	8	9	10	Final
China (Wang)	2	0	4	0	5	0	X	X	X	X	11
Australia (Forge)	0	2	0	1	0	2	X	X	X	X	5

Sheet D	1	2	3	4	5	6	7	8	9	10	Final
South Korea (Kim)	1	1	3	0	2	0	3	X	X	X	10
New Zealand (Donald)	0	0	0	2	0	1	0	X	X	X	3

==== Draw 5 ====
Thursday, November 18, 19:00

Sheet A	1	2	3	4	5	6	7	8	9	10	Final
Australia (Forge)	1	0	1	0	1	0	1	X	X	X	4
New Zealand (Donald)	0	4	0	2	0	4	0	X	X	X	10

Sheet C	1	2	3	4	5	6	7	8	9	10	Final
South Korea (Kim)	2	0	1	1	0	0	2	1	0	X	7
Japan (Yamaura)	0	2	0	0	0	2	0	0	1	X	5

==== Draw 6 ====
Friday, November 19, 12:00

Sheet B	1	2	3	4	5	6	7	8	9	10	Final
China (Wang)	2	1	0	0	1	1	2	0	X	X	7
New Zealand (Donald)	0	0	1	1	0	0	0	1	X	X	3

Sheet D	1	2	3	4	5	6	7	8	9	10	Final
Australia (Forge)	0	0	1	0	1	0	0	X	X	X	2
Japan (Yamaura)	1	5	0	2	0	0	0	X	X	X	8

==== Draw 7 ====
Friday, November 19, 20:00

Sheet A	1	2	3	4	5	6	7	8	9	10	Final
China (Wang)	2	0	0	0	2	2	0	4	X	X	10
Japan (Yamaura)	0	0	1	0	0	0	2	0	X	X	3

Sheet B	1	2	3	4	5	6	7	8	9	10	Final
South Korea (Kim)	1	2	2	1	0	1	4	X	X	X	11
Australia (Forge)	0	0	0	0	0	0	0	X	X	X	0

==== Draw 8 ====
Saturday, November 20, 14:30

Sheet B	1	2	3	4	5	6	7	8	9	10	Final
New Zealand (Donald)	0	1	0	0	2	0	2	0	X	X	5
Japan (Yamaura)	2	0	3	2	0	3	0	2	X	X	12

Sheet D	1	2	3	4	5	6	7	8	9	10	Final
China (Wang)	2	0	0	1	0	1	0	1	1	1	7
South Korea (Kim)	0	0	1	0	1	0	3	0	0	0	5

==== Draw 9 ====
Sunday, November 21, 8:00

Sheet A	1	2	3	4	5	6	7	8	9	10	Final
New Zealand (Donald)	0	0	0	0	0	2	0	0	1	X	3
South Korea (Kim)	0	1	1	1	1	0	3	1	0	X	8

Sheet B	1	2	3	4	5	6	7	8	9	10	Final
Australia (Forge)	0	0	2	0	0	1	0	0	X	X	3
China (Wang)	1	2	0	1	1	0	1	3	X	X	9

==== Draw 10 ====
Sunday, November 21, 16:00

Sheet B	1	2	3	4	5	6	7	8	9	10	Final
Japan (Yamaura)	1	0	0	2	0	0	0	0	2	0	5
South Korea (Kim)	0	1	0	0	0	1	0	3	0	4	9

Sheet D	1	2	3	4	5	6	7	8	9	10	Final
New Zealand (Donald)	1	0	0	3	0	4	3	X	X	X	11
Australia (Forge)	0	2	1	0	1	0	0	X	X	X	4

=== Playoffs ===
Note: First two games of Semifinals best-of-five are taken from round-robin games.

Semifinals
1	China	9	7	8	–	–
4	New Zealand	5	3	0	–	–
2	South Korea	7	9	7	–	–
3	Japan	5	5	5	–	–

Finals
1	China	7
2	South Korea	10
Bronze medal final
4	New Zealand	4
3	Japan	7

==== Semifinals ====
Monday, November 22, 9:00

Sheet A	1	2	3	4	5	6	7	8	9	10	Final
South Korea (Kim)	1	0	0	0	1	1	0	2	2	X	7
Japan (Yamaura)	0	0	1	3	0	0	1	0	0	X	5

Sheet B	1	2	3	4	5	6	7	8	9	10	Final
New Zealand (Donald)	0	0	0	0	0	0	0	0	X	X	0
China (Wang)	1	1	1	1	1	1	1	1	X	X	8

==== Bronze Final ====
Tuesday, November 23, 12:00

Team	1	2	3	4	5	6	7	8	9	10	Final
Japan (Yamaura)	0	0	1	0	3	0	1	1	0	1	7
New Zealand (Donald)	1	0	0	1	0	1	0	0	1	0	4

==== Final ====
Tuesday, November 23, 12:00

Team	1	2	3	4	5	6	7	8	9	10	Final
China (Wang)	2	0	2	0	0	0	2	0	1	0	7
South Korea (Kim)	0	1	0	1	1	2	0	3	0	2	10

== Men ==
=== Teams ===
Australia	China	Japan
Skip: Hugh Millikin Third: Ian Palangio; Second: John Theriault; Lead: Matthew Panoussi; Alternate: Vaughan Rosier; Coach: Jay Merchant	Skip: Wang Fengchun Third: Xu Xiaoming; Second: Zang Jialiang; Lead: Ba Dexin; Alternate: Chen Lu'an; Coach: Zhang Wei	Skip: Makoto Tsuruga Third: Yuki Sawamukai; Second: Yusaku Sibaya; Lead: Ryosuke Hameishi; Alternate: Taichi Teramachi; Coach: Tetsu Eda
South Korea	New Zealand	Chinese Taipei
Skip: Lee Dong-keun Third: Kim Soo-hyuk; Second: Kim Tae-hwan; Lead: Nam Yoon-ho; Alternate: Lee Ye-jun; Coach: Lee Doo-sung	Skip: Sean Becker Third: Warren Kearney; Second: Kris Miller; Lead: Warren Dobson; Alternate: Kenny Thomson; Coach: Peter Becker	Skip: Randolph Shen Third: Nicholas Hsu; Second: Brendon Liu; Lead: Jan-Quinn Yu; Alternate: Steve Koo; Coach: Craig Lightbody

=== Standings ===
Country	Skip	W	L
China	Wang Fengchun	10	0
South Korea	Lee Dong Keun	6	4
New Zealand	Sean Becker	5	5
Australia	Hugh Millikin	4	6
Chinese Taipei	Randolph Shen	3	7
Japan	Makoto Tsuruga	2	8

=== Results ===
==== Draw 1 ====
Tuesday, November 16, 10:00

Sheet A	1	2	3	4	5	6	7	8	9	10	Final
Japan (Tsuruga)	2	0	2	0	1	0	1	1	0	1	8
New Zealand (Becker)	0	2	0	1	0	2	0	0	1	0	6

Sheet B	1	2	3	4	5	6	7	8	9	10	Final
South Korea (Lee)	0	2	0	2	0	1	1	0	0	1	7
Australia (Millikin)	0	0	1	0	2	0	0	2	1	0	6

Sheet C	1	2	3	4	5	6	7	8	9	10	Final
China (Wang)	0	2	3	0	2	5	X	X	X	X	12
Chinese Taipei (Shen)	1	0	0	1	0	0	X	X	X	X	2

==== Draw 2 ====
Tuesday, November 16, 19:00

Sheet B	1	2	3	4	5	6	7	8	9	10	Final
New Zealand (Becker)	1	0	2	0	0	1	0	0	0	X	4
China (Wang)	0	2	0	0	0	0	2	1	3	X	8

Sheet C	1	2	3	4	5	6	7	8	9	10	Final
Japan (Tsuruga)	0	0	1	1	0	0	2	0	0	X	4
Australia (Millikin)	0	2	0	0	1	2	0	2	1	X	8

Sheet D	1	2	3	4	5	6	7	8	9	10	Final
South Korea (Lee)	1	0	2	0	1	2	1	0	X	X	7
Chinese Taipei (Shen)	0	1	0	0	0	0	0	1	X	X	2

==== Draw 3 ====
Wednesday, November 17, 12:00

Sheet A	1	2	3	4	5	6	7	8	9	10	Final
South Korea (Lee)	1	0	0	0	1	0	3	0	0	X	5
China (Wang)	0	0	2	3	0	1	0	2	1	X	9

Sheet B	1	2	3	4	5	6	7	8	9	10	Final
Chinese Taipei (Shen)	0	1	0	0	1	2	0	3	0	0	7
Japan (Tsuruga)	1	0	0	1	0	0	2	0	1	1	6

Sheet D	1	2	3	4	5	6	7	8	9	10	Final
New Zealand (Becker)	0	2	0	0	0	0	2	0	2	2	8
Australia (Millikin)	0	0	1	3	1	1	0	1	0	0	7

==== Draw 4 ====
Wednesday, November 17, 20:00

Sheet A	1	2	3	4	5	6	7	8	9	10	Final
New Zealand (Becker)	2	0	0	2	1	0	4	0	0	0	9
Chinese Taipei (Shen)	0	2	1	0	0	1	0	2	1	1	8

Sheet C	1	2	3	4	5	6	7	8	9	10	Final
Australia (Millikin)	0	0	1	0	1	0	0	0	X	X	2
China (Wang)	1	2	0	2	0	2	0	3	X	X	10

Sheet D	1	2	3	4	5	6	7	8	9	10	Final
Japan (Tsuruga)	1	0	1	0	0	0	1	1	0	X	4
South Korea (Lee)	0	2	0	0	2	2	0	0	1	X	7

==== Draw 5 ====
Thursday, November 18, 14:30

Sheet A	1	2	3	4	5	6	7	8	9	10	Final
China (Wang)	0	3	0	3	4	2	X	X	X	X	12
Japan (Tsuruga)	1	0	1	0	0	0	X	X	X	X	2

Sheet B	1	2	3	4	5	6	7	8	9	10	Final
Australia (Millikin)	3	0	0	1	0	0	3	0	2	X	9
Chinese Taipei (Shen)	0	1	1	0	1	0	0	1	0	X	4

Sheet C	1	2	3	4	5	6	7	8	9	10	Final
New Zealand (Becker)	3	2	1	0	0	2	0	X	X	X	8
South Korea (Lee)	0	0	0	1	0	0	1	X	X	X	2

==== Draw 6 ====
Friday, November 19, 8:00

Sheet A	1	2	3	4	5	6	7	8	9	10	Final
Australia (Millikin)	0	1	0	2	0	0	0	0	0	X	3
South Korea (Lee)	2	0	1	0	2	1	1	0	1	X	8

Sheet B	1	2	3	4	5	6	7	8	9	10	Final
New Zealand (Becker)	1	0	1	0	1	0	0	2	0	X	5
Japan (Tsuruga)	0	2	0	2	0	3	0	0	2	X	9

Sheet D	1	2	3	4	5	6	7	8	9	10	Final
Chinese Taipei (Shen)	0	1	0	0	1	0	0	1	0	X	3
China (Wang)	1	0	2	0	0	0	3	0	1	X	7

==== Draw 7 ====
Friday, November 19, 16:00

Sheet A	1	2	3	4	5	6	7	8	9	10	Final
China (Wang)	3	0	1	1	0	1	0	3	X	X	9
New Zealand (Becker)	0	1	0	0	1	0	1	0	X	X	3

Sheet C	1	2	3	4	5	6	7	8	9	10	Final
Chinese Taipei (Shen)	0	1	0	1	0	1	0	0	0	2	5
South Korea (Lee)	0	0	2	0	1	0	1	0	0	0	4

Sheet D	1	2	3	4	5	6	7	8	9	10	Final
Australia (Millikin)	3	0	4	0	0	0	3	X	X	X	10
Japan (Tsuruga)	0	1	0	0	0	2	0	X	X	X	3

==== Draw 8 ====
Saturday, November 20, 10:00

Sheet A	1	2	3	4	5	6	7	8	9	10	Final
Japan (Tsuruga)	0	1	0	2	0	0	0	0	1	X	4
Chinese Taipei (Shen)	1	0	2	0	1	1	1	1	0	X	7

Sheet B	1	2	3	4	5	6	7	8	9	10	Final
China (Wang)	2	0	0	2	2	0	0	1	3	X	10
South Korea (Lee)	0	0	1	0	0	1	1	0	0	X	3

Sheet C	1	2	3	4	5	6	7	8	9	10	Final
Australia (Millikin)	0	2	0	0	0	1	0	3	0	0	6
New Zealand (Becker)	0	0	1	1	1	0	3	0	1	2	9

==== Draw 9 ====
Saturday, November 20, 19:00

Sheet B	1	2	3	4	5	6	7	8	9	10	Final
Chinese Taipei (Shen)	0	0	0	0	2	0	X	X	X	X	2
New Zealand (Becker)	0	2	5	1	0	1	X	X	X	X	9

Sheet C	1	2	3	4	5	6	7	8	9	10	Final
South Korea (Lee)	0	4	1	0	2	1	0	4	X	X	12
Japan (Tsuruga)	1	0	0	2	0	0	1	0	X	X	4

Sheet D	1	2	3	4	5	6	7	8	9	10	Final
China (Wang)	2	0	2	0	2	0	0	1	0	X	7
Australia (Millikin)	0	2	0	0	0	1	0	0	1	X	4

==== Draw 10 ====
Sunday, November 21, 12:00

Sheet A	1	2	3	4	5	6	7	8	9	10	11	Final
Chinese Taipei (Shen)	0	1	0	2	0	0	0	2	1	0	0	6
Australia (Millikin)	0	0	2	0	1	1	1	0	0	1	3	9

Sheet B	1	2	3	4	5	6	7	8	9	10	Final
Japan (Tsuruga)	0	0	0	1	0	1	X	X	X	X	2
China (Wang)	1	2	2	0	3	0	X	X	X	X	8

Sheet D	1	2	3	4	5	6	7	8	9	10	11	Final
South Korea (Lee)	1	1	0	1	0	1	1	0	3	0	2	10
New Zealand (Becker)	0	0	2	0	3	0	0	2	0	1	0	8

=== Playoffs ===
Note: First two games of Semifinals best-of-five are taken from round-robin games.

Semifinals
1	China	10	7	8	–	–
4	Australia	2	4	2	–	–
2	South Korea	2	10	8	6	–
3	New Zealand	8	8	7	5	–

Finals
1	China	9
2	South Korea	3
Bronze medal final
4	Australia	9
3	New Zealand	4

==== Semifinals ====
Monday, November 22, 9:00

Sheet C	1	2	3	4	5	6	7	8	9	10	Final
China (Wang)	2	0	1	0	2	1	1	1	X	X	8
Australia (Millikin)	0	1	0	1	0	0	0	0	X	X	2

Sheet D	1	2	3	4	5	6	7	8	9	10	11	Final
South Korea (Lee)	2	0	0	1	0	1	0	3	0	0	1	8
New Zealand (Becker)	0	0	2	0	2	0	0	0	2	1	0	7

Monday, November 22, 14:00

Sheet C	1	2	3	4	5	6	7	8	9	10	11	Final
South Korea (Lee)	0	2	0	0	0	0	3	0	0	0	1	6
New Zealand (Becker)	1	0	1	0	1	1	0	0	0	1	0	5

==== Bronze Final ====
Tuesday, November 23, 12:00

Team	1	2	3	4	5	6	7	8	9	10	Final
Australia (Millikin)	0	2	0	1	1	0	2	0	3	X	9
New Zealand (Becker)	2	0	0	0	0	1	0	1	0	X	4

==== Final ====
Tuesday, November 23, 12:00

Team	1	2	3	4	5	6	7	8	9	10	Final
China (Wang)	2	0	0	1	3	0	0	3	X	X	9
South Korea (Lee)	0	0	2	0	0	0	1	0	X	X	3
