= Urs Eichhorn =

Swiss curler

- Curler ♂
- Born: 17 May 1979 (age 47)

Team
- Curling club: St. Moritz CC, St. Moritz

Curling career
- Member Association: Switzerland
- World Championship: 1 (2011)
- European Championship: 1 (2010)
- Other appearances: World Junior Championships: 1 (1999), Winter Universiade: 1 (2003)
Medal record
Curling
European Championships
Bronze medal – third place	2010 Champéry
Swiss Men's Championship
Gold medal – first place	2011 Gstaad
World Junior Championships
Silver medal – second place	1999 Östersund
Winter Universiade
Silver medal – second place	2003 Tarvisio

Urs Eichhorn (born 17 May 1979) is a Swiss curler.

At the international level, he is a 2010 European bronze medallist.

At the national level, he is a 2011 Swiss men's champion curler.

== Teams ==
Season	Skip	Third	Second	Lead	Alternate	Coach	Events
1997–98	Christian Haller	Urs Eichhorn	Pascal Albertin	René Kunz			SJCC 1998 (gold)
1998–99	Christian Haller	Urs Eichhorn	Pascal Albertin	René Kunz	Patrick Vuille	Jens Piesbergen	WJCC 1999 (silver)
2002–03	Cyril Stutz	Urs Eichhorn	Christian Haller	Yves Hess	Reto Herger	Christian Albrecht	WUG 2003 (silver)
2004–05	Jean-Nicolas Longchamp	Stewart Dryburgh	Urs Eichhorn	Aurelien Lathuiliere			SMCC 2005 (8th)
2006–07	Jean-Nicolas Longchamp	Urs Eichhorn	Christian Haller	Andreas Klauenbosch			
2007–08	Jean-Nicolas Longchamp	Urs Eichhorn	Christian Haller	Andreas Klauenbosch			
2009–10	Pascal Hess	Yves Hess	Urs Eichhorn	Florian Zürrer			
2010–11	Christof Schwaller	Marco Ramstein	Robert Hürlimann	Urs Eichhorn	Rolf Iseli; Dominic Andres; Toni Müller (ECC); Sven Michel (WCC)	Michael Reid (SMCC); Christoph Zysset (ECC, WCC)	ECC 2010 (bronze); SMCC 2011 (gold); WCC 2011 (7th)
