= 2009 World Women's Curling Championship =

- Host city: Gangneung, South Korea
- Arena: Gangneung International Ice Rink
- Dates: March 21–29, 2009
- Winner: China
- Curling club: Harbin CC, Harbin
- Skip: Wang Bingyu
- Third: Liu Yin
- Second: Yue Qingshuang
- Lead: Zhou Yan
- Alternate: Liu Jinli
- Coach: (Canada) Daniel Rafael
- Finalist: Sweden (Anette Norberg)

The 2009 World Women's Curling Championship (branded as 2009 Mount Titlis World Women's Curling Championship for sponsorship reasons) was held in Gangneung, South Korea from March 21 to 29.

China, skipped by Wang Bingyu won its first World Women's Championship, and the first for an Asian team, defeating Sweden's Anette Norberg rink in the final, 8–6. China scored the game's first deuce in the fourth end when Wang made a hit and role to take a 3–1 lead. Sweden was forced to a single in the fifth after Norberg made a hit and roll to the four-foot. China scored another two points in the sixth, which was followed up by a Swedish deuce in seven, thanks to Wang wrecking on her last, and Norberg drawing for the second point. China took a 7–4 lead after eight after Wang made a hit and stick for two, followed up by a Norberg draw for two in the 9th. In the final end, with Sweden down 7–6, Norberg drew to the four foot to lie two on her final shot. China had hammer though, and on her last rock, Wang made a double takeout on the two Swedish rocks to win the game. After to losing to Canada in the round robin, China won 12 straight games en route to the championship. There were over 1,500 spectators in attendance for the final.

Denmark won the bronze medal, defeating Canada 7–6 in the third place match.

== Qualification ==
- South Korea (Host country)
- Canada (Defending champion)
- China (Pacific champion)
- United States (Americas region)
- Top 8 finishers from the 2008 European Curling Championships:
  - Switzerland
  - Sweden
  - Denmark
  - Germany
  - Italy
  - Scotland
  - Russia
  - Norway - winner of challenge series vs England

== Teams ==
Canada	China	Denmark
St. Vital CC, Winnipeg Skip: Jennifer Jones; Third: Cathy Overton-Clapham; Second: Jill Officer; Lead: Dawn Askin; Alternate: Jennifer Clark-Rouire	Harbin CC, Harbin Skip: Wang Bingyu; Third: Liu Yin; Second: Yue Qingshuang; Lead: Zhou Yan; Alternate: Liu Jinli	Tårnby CC, Tårnby Fourth: Madeleine Dupont; Third: Denise Dupont; Skip: Angelina Jensen; Lead: Camilla Jensen; Alternate: Ane Hansen
Germany	Italy	South Korea
SC Riessersee, Garmisch-Partenkirchen Skip: Andrea Schöpp; Third: Monika Wagner; Second: Melanie Robillard; Lead: Stella Heiß; Alternate: Tina Tichatschke	CC Dolomiti, Cortina d'Ampezzo Skip: Diana Gaspari; Third: Giorgia Apollonio; Second: Violetta Caldart; Lead: Elettra De Col; Alternate: Claudia Alvera	Kyung Gido Council, Gyeonggi-do Skip: Kim Mi-yeon; Third: Shin Mi-sung; Second: Lee Seul-bee; Lead: Lee Hyun-jung; Alternate: Kim Ji-sun
Norway	Russia	Scotland
Oppdal CK, Oppdal Skip: Marianne Rørvik; Third: Henriette Løvar; Second: Kristin Skaslien; Lead: Ingrid Stensrud; Alternate: Kristin Tøsse Løvseth	Moskvitch CC, Moscow Skip: Ludmila Privivkova; Third: Olga Jarkova; Second: Nkeiruka Ezekh; Lead: Ekaterina Galkina; Alternate: Margarita Fomina	Dunkeld CC, Perth Skip: Eve Muirhead; Third: Karen Addison; Second: Rachael Simms; Lead: Anne Laird; Alternate: Jackie Lockhart
Sweden	Switzerland	United States
Härnösands CK, Härnösand Skip: Anette Norberg; Third: Eva Lund; Second: Cathrine Lindahl; Lead: Margaretha Sigfridsson; Alternate: Kajsa Bergström	Davos CC, Davos Skip: Mirjam Ott; Third: Carmen Schäfer; Second: Valeria Spälty; Lead: Janine Greiner; Alternate: Carmen Küng	Madison CC, McFarland Skip: Debbie McCormick; Third: Allison Pottinger; Second: Nicole Joraanstad; Lead: Natalie Nicholson; Alternate: Tracy Sachtjen

== Round robin standings ==
Country	Skip	W	L	PF	PA	Ends Won	Ends Lost	Blank Ends	Stolen Ends	Shot Pct.
China	Wang Bingyu	10	1	81	53	51	38	11	19	81%
Denmark	Angelina Jensen	9	2	78	55	49	40	13	12	80%
Canada	Jennifer Jones	9	2	88	60	50	44	7	13	84%
Sweden	Anette Norberg	7	4	79	65	47	45	11	13	80%
Switzerland	Mirjam Ott	6	5	79	70	51	48	7	20	79%
Germany	Andrea Schöpp	6	5	73	60	51	43	11	18	77%
Russia	Ludmila Privivkova	5	6	62	74	41	52	11	7	79%
Scotland	Eve Muirhead	5	6	62	64	42	40	18	11	80%
United States	Debbie McCormick	4	7	67	78	47	48	3	13	79%
South Korea	Kim Mi-yeon	3	8	59	73	41	47	11	13	73%
Norway	Marianne Rørvik	1	10	52	91	39	50	11	7	73%
Italy	Diana Gaspari	1	10	47	85	35	50	13	5	73%

== Round robin results ==
All times local (UTC +9 or Korean Standard Time)

=== Draw 1 ===
March 21, 2009

Sheet A	1	2	3	4	5	6	7	8	9	10	Final
Norway (Rørvik)	0	0	0	1	0	1	0	0	X	X	2
Denmark (Jensen)	0	2	0	0	2	0	3	3	X	X	10

Sheet B	1	2	3	4	5	6	7	8	9	10	Final
Italy (Gaspari)	0	0	0	1	0	0	0	1	0	0	2
Sweden (Norberg)	0	1	0	0	2	1	1	0	2	0	7

Sheet C	1	2	3	4	5	6	7	8	9	10	Final
South Korea (Kim)	0	1	0	1	0	0	1	0	0	1	4
Scotland (Muirhead)	1	0	0	0	1	0	0	1	3	0	6

Sheet D	1	2	3	4	5	6	7	8	9	10	Final
Switzerland (Ott)	0	1	0	1	2	0	0	0	2	1	7
Germany (Schöpp)	0	0	2	0	0	2	0	1	0	0	5

=== Draw 2 ===
March 21, 2009

Sheet A	1	2	3	4	5	6	7	8	9	10	Final
Scotland (Muirhead)	1	3	0	4	3	0	X	X	X	X	11
Italy (Gaspari)	0	0	1	0	0	1	X	X	X	X	2

Sheet B	1	2	3	4	5	6	7	8	9	10	Final
Canada (Jones)	1	0	3	1	0	2	1	0	3	X	11
China (Wang)	0	2	0	0	2	0	0	1	0	X	5

Sheet C	1	2	3	4	5	6	7	8	9	10	Final
Russia (Privivkova)	0	1	0	3	0	1	0	1	1	0	7
United States (McCormick)	1	0	1	0	1	0	1	0	0	1	5

Sheet D	1	2	3	4	5	6	7	8	9	10	11	12	Final
South Korea (Kim)	1	1	0	1	0	2	0	2	0	1	0	0	8
Sweden (Norberg)	0	0	2	0	3	0	1	0	2	0	0	2	10

=== Draw 3 ===
March 22, 2009

Sheet B	1	2	3	4	5	6	7	8	9	10	Final
Germany (Schöpp)	0	1	0	0	0	2	0	0	1	1	5
Norway (Rørvik)	0	0	1	0	0	0	1	1	0	0	3

Sheet C	1	2	3	4	5	6	7	8	9	10	Final
Switzerland (Ott)	2	2	0	3	0	0	0	1	0	0	8
Denmark (Jensen)	0	0	2	0	2	1	1	0	2	1	9

=== Draw 4 ===
March 22, 2009

Sheet A	1	2	3	4	5	6	7	8	9	10	Final
China (Wang)	0	1	1	0	4	0	2	1	X	X	9
Russia (Privivkova)	2	0	0	1	0	0	0	0	X	X	3

Sheet B	1	2	3	4	5	6	7	8	9	10	Final
Sweden (Norberg)	1	0	0	4	0	0	2	0	1	0	8
Scotland (Muirhead)	0	0	1	0	2	1	0	1	0	0	5

Sheet C	1	2	3	4	5	6	7	8	9	10	Final
Italy (Gaspari)	0	1	0	1	0	0	1	0	0	1	4
South Korea (Kim)	0	0	0	0	1	2	0	2	1	0	6

Sheet D	1	2	3	4	5	6	7	8	9	10	Final
Canada (Jones)	2	0	1	0	2	0	3	2	X	X	10
United States (McCormick)	0	1	0	1	0	1	0	0	X	X	3

=== Draw 5 ===
March 22, 2009

Sheet A	1	2	3	4	5	6	7	8	9	10	Final
Denmark (Jensen)	1	3	0	1	0	0	1	0	0	1	7
Germany (Schöpp)	0	0	1	0	2	1	0	1	1	0	6

Sheet B	1	2	3	4	5	6	7	8	9	10	Final
Russia (Privivkova)	0	3	0	0	1	0	0	0	1	0	5
Canada (Jones)	2	0	1	3	0	1	1	0	0	0	8

Sheet C	1	2	3	4	5	6	7	8	9	10	Final
United States (McCormick)	0	1	0	2	0	1	0	0	0	X	4
China (Wang)	1	0	2	0	1	0	1	1	2	X	8

Sheet D	1	2	3	4	5	6	7	8	9	10	Final
Norway (Rørvik)	1	0	1	0	1	0	1	2	0	0	6
Switzerland (Ott)	0	2	0	2	0	1	0	0	2	1	8

=== Draw 6 ===
March 23, 2009

Sheet A	1	2	3	4	5	6	7	8	9	10	Final
Switzerland (Ott)	0	0	0	0	2	0	2	2	0	1	7
South Korea (Kim)	0	1	0	1	0	2	0	0	2	0	6

Sheet B	1	2	3	4	5	6	7	8	9	10	Final
Germany (Schöpp)	0	2	1	1	1	0	3	X	X	X	8
Italy (Gaspari)	0	0	0	0	0	1	0	X	X	X	1

Sheet C	1	2	3	4	5	6	7	8	9	10	11	Final
Norway (Rørvik)	2	1	0	0	2	0	0	1	0	1	0	7
Scotland (Muirhead)	0	0	2	1	0	0	2	0	2	0	1	8

Sheet D	1	2	3	4	5	6	7	8	9	10	11	Final
Denmark (Jensen)	0	2	0	0	1	1	0	2	0	0	1	7
Sweden (Norberg)	1	0	2	0	0	0	2	0	0	1	0	6

=== Draw 7 ===
March 23, 2009

Sheet A	1	2	3	4	5	6	7	8	9	10	Final
Italy (Gaspari)	2	0	1	0	0	2	0	4	0	0	9
United States (McCormick)	0	1	0	2	0	0	2	0	1	0	6

Sheet B	1	2	3	4	5	6	7	8	9	10	Final
South Korea (Kim)	0	1	0	1	0	1	0	2	1	0	6
China (Wang)	3	0	0	0	1	0	2	0	0	1	7

Sheet C	1	2	3	4	5	6	7	8	9	10	Final
Sweden (Norberg)	0	0	1	2	0	1	0	3	2	X	9
Russia (Privivkova)	0	1	0	0	1	0	1	0	0	X	3

Sheet D	1	2	3	4	5	6	7	8	9	10	Final
Scotland (Muirhead)	0	1	0	1	0	1	X	X	X	X	3
Canada (Jones)	3	0	1	0	5	0	X	X	X	X	9

=== Draw 8 ===
March 23, 2009

Sheet A	1	2	3	4	5	6	7	8	9	10	Final
Canada (Jones)	1	0	2	0	2	0	0	3	0	X	8
Norway (Rørvik)	0	1	0	2	0	1	0	0	1	X	5

Sheet B	1	2	3	4	5	6	7	8	9	10	Final
Russia (Privivkova)	1	0	1	0	1	0	1	0	0	X	4
Denmark (Jensen)	0	2	0	1	0	3	0	0	1	X	7

Sheet C	1	2	3	4	5	6	7	8	9	10	Final
China (Wang)	2	0	1	0	1	1	0	0	2	1	8
Switzerland (Ott)	0	2	0	2	0	0	2	1	0	0	7

Sheet D	1	2	3	4	5	6	7	8	9	10	Final
United States (McCormick)	0	1	1	0	2	0	2	1	0	0	7
Germany (Schöpp)	1	0	0	1	0	1	0	0	1	2	6

=== Draw 9 ===
March 24, 2009

Sheet A	1	2	3	4	5	6	7	8	9	10	Final
China (Wang)	2	0	1	3	0	0	0	1	0	1	8
Denmark (Jensen)	0	1	0	0	0	2	1	0	1	0	5

Sheet B	1	2	3	4	5	6	7	8	9	10	Final
United States (McCormick)	2	3	0	1	0	2	0	0	4	X	12
Norway (Rørvik)	0	0	2	0	2	0	1	2	0	X	7

Sheet C	1	2	3	4	5	6	7	8	9	10	Final
Canada (Jones)	1	0	3	0	2	1	1	0	0	0	8
Germany (Schöpp)	0	1	0	2	0	0	0	1	2	1	7

Sheet D	1	2	3	4	5	6	7	8	9	10	Final
Russia (Privivkova)	0	0	0	0	2	0	1	1	0	0	4
Switzerland (Ott)	2	1	1	1	0	1	0	0	1	1	8

=== Draw 10 ===
March 24, 2009

Sheet A	1	2	3	4	5	6	7	8	9	10	Final
Germany (Schöpp)	2	1	0	4	1	1	1	X	X	X	10
Sweden (Norberg)	0	0	1	0	0	0	0	X	X	X	1

Sheet B	1	2	3	4	5	6	7	8	9	10	Final
Switzerland (Ott)	0	0	1	0	0	2	0	2	0	0	5
Scotland (Muirhead)	1	1	0	2	1	0	1	0	0	1	7

Sheet C	1	2	3	4	5	6	7	8	9	10	Final
Denmark (Jensen)	0	2	0	0	2	0	1	0	2	X	7
Italy (Gaspari)	1	0	0	1	0	1	0	1	0	X	4

Sheet D	1	2	3	4	5	6	7	8	9	10	Final
Norway (Rørvik)	0	2	0	3	1	0	1	0	0	1	8
South Korea (Kim)	3	0	2	0	0	1	0	1	2	0	9

=== Draw 11 ===
March 24, 2009

Sheet A	1	2	3	4	5	6	7	8	9	10	Final
Scotland (Muirhead)	2	0	0	0	1	0	1	0	0	X	4
Russia (Fomina)	0	0	0	2	0	1	0	1	2	X	6

Sheet B	1	2	3	4	5	6	7	8	9	10	Final
South Korea (Kim)	0	0	0	2	0	0	0	0	X	X	2
United States (McCormick)	1	2	1	0	2	1	1	1	X	X	9

Sheet C	1	2	3	4	5	6	7	8	9	10	Final
Sweden (Norberg)	1	0	1	0	1	0	1	2	0	1	7
Canada (Jones)	0	2	0	1	0	1	0	0	0	0	4

Sheet D	1	2	3	4	5	6	7	8	9	10	Final
Italy (Gaspari)	0	1	0	0	2	0	0	0	X	X	3
China (Wang)	2	0	2	0	0	3	1	1	X	X	9

=== Draw 12 ===
March 25, 2009

Sheet A	1	2	3	4	5	6	7	8	9	10	Final
South Korea (Kim)	1	0	2	1	1	0	0	0	1	0	6
Canada (Jones)	0	2	0	0	0	1	1	1	0	2	7

Sheet B	1	2	3	4	5	6	7	8	9	10	11	Final
Italy (Gaspari)	1	0	1	0	1	0	1	1	1	0	0	6
Russia (Fomina)	0	0	0	1	0	3	0	0	0	2	1	7

Sheet C	1	2	3	4	5	6	7	8	9	10	11	Final
Scotland (Muirhead)	0	0	0	1	0	0	0	1	1	0	0	3
China (Wang)	0	0	0	0	1	0	0	0	0	2	1	4

Sheet D	1	2	3	4	5	6	7	8	9	10	Final
Sweden (Norberg)	0	1	0	1	0	0	2	1	0	X	5
United States (McCormick)	1	0	2	0	3	1	0	0	3	X	10

=== Draw 13 ===
March 25, 2009

Sheet A	1	2	3	4	5	6	7	8	9	10	Final
United States (McCormick)	1	0	0	0	0	0	1	X	X	X	2
Switzerland (Ott)	0	2	2	1	1	2	0	X	X	X	8

Sheet B	1	2	3	4	5	6	7	8	9	10	Final
China (Wang)	1	0	0	2	0	3	1	1	X	X	8
Germany (Schöpp)	0	1	0	0	1	0	0	0	X	X	2

Sheet C	1	2	3	4	5	6	7	8	9	10	Final
Russia (Fomina)	1	1	2	0	0	1	0	2	X	X	7
Norway (Rørvik)	0	0	0	0	1	0	1	0	X	X	2

Sheet D	1	2	3	4	5	6	7	8	9	10	Final
Canada (Jones)	2	0	0	2	0	0	0	1	0	0	5
Denmark (Jensen)	0	0	1	0	1	1	0	0	2	2	7

=== Draw 14 ===
March 25, 2009

Sheet A	1	2	3	4	5	6	7	8	9	10	Final
Norway (Rørvik)	0	0	1	1	0	3	0	2	0	1	8
Italy (Gaspari)	0	2	0	0	1	0	1	0	2	0	6

Sheet B	1	2	3	4	5	6	7	8	9	10	Final
Denmark (Jensen)	1	0	1	0	1	0	0	0	1	X	4
South Korea (Kim)	0	4	0	1	0	0	1	1	0	X	7

Sheet C	1	2	3	4	5	6	7	8	9	10	Final
Switzerland (Ott)	0	1	0	2	0	0	1	1	1	0	6
Sweden (Norberg)	3	0	1	0	2	0	0	0	0	2	8

Sheet D	1	2	3	4	5	6	7	8	9	10	11	Final
Germany (Schöpp)	3	0	0	0	0	0	1	0	1	1	1	7
Scotland (Muirhead)	0	0	2	1	0	0	0	3	0	0	0	6

=== Draw 15 ===
March 26, 2009 1000

Sheet A	1	2	3	4	5	6	7	8	9	10	Final
Sweden (Norberg)	0	2	1	1	0	0	1	0	2	X	7
China (Wang)	3	0	0	0	2	2	0	1	0	X	8

Sheet B	1	2	3	4	5	6	7	8	9	10	Final
Scotland (Muirhead)	0	0	2	0	2	0	1	1	1	0	7
United States (McCormick)	1	1	0	1	0	1	0	0	0	2	6

Sheet C	1	2	3	4	5	6	7	8	9	10	Final
Italy (Gaspari)	0	3	0	0	1	0	1	0	0	X	5
Canada (Jones)	2	0	1	2	0	0	0	2	1	X	8

Sheet D	1	2	3	4	5	6	7	8	9	10	Final
South Korea (Kim)	0	0	2	0	0	1	0	3	2	0	8
Russia (Fomina)	0	1	0	3	3	0	2	0	0	1	10

=== Draw 16 ===
March 26, 2009 1500

Sheet A	1	2	3	4	5	6	7	8	9	10	Final
Denmark (Jensen)	0	0	1	0	2	0	1	2	X	X	6
Scotland (Muirhead)	0	0	0	1	0	1	0	0	X	X	2

Sheet B	1	2	3	4	5	6	7	8	9	10	Final
Norway (Rørvik)	0	0	1	0	0	1	0	X	X	X	2
Sweden (Norberg)	0	2	0	3	1	0	5	X	X	X	11

Sheet C	1	2	3	4	5	6	7	8	9	10	Final
Germany (Schöpp)	0	1	0	0	2	0	2	0	2	2	9
South Korea (Kim)	1	0	0	2	0	1	0	2	0	0	6

Sheet D	1	2	3	4	5	6	7	8	9	10	Final
Switzerland (Ott)	2	1	0	2	0	2	1	0	0	X	8
Italy (Gaspari)	0	0	2	0	1	0	0	2	0	X	5

=== Draw 17 ===
March 26, 2009 2000

Sheet A	1	2	3	4	5	6	7	8	9	10	Final
Russia (Fomina)	1	0	3	0	1	0	0	0	1	0	6
Germany (Schöpp)	0	1	0	2	0	0	1	1	0	3	8

Sheet B	1	2	3	4	5	6	7	8	9	10	Final
Canada (Jones)	3	1	0	2	0	1	0	1	0	2	10
Switzerland (Ott)	0	0	1	0	2	0	3	0	1	0	7

Sheet C	1	2	3	4	5	6	7	8	9	10	Final
United States (McCormick)	0	1	0	1	0	1	0	0	X	X	3
Denmark (Jensen)	0	0	3	0	1	0	2	3	X	X	9

Sheet D	1	2	3	4	5	6	7	8	9	10	Final
China (Wang)	0	1	0	3	1	1	1	0	X	X	7
Norway (Rørvik)	0	0	1	0	0	0	0	1	X	X	2

== Playoffs ==
Page playoff system
1	China	6
2	Denmark	3
3	Canada	4
4	Sweden	5

Semifinal
2	Denmark	6
4	Sweden	7

Gold Medal Game
1	China	8
4	Sweden	6

Bronze Medal Game
2	Denmark	7
3	Canada	6

=== 1 vs. 2 ===
March 27, 2009 2000

Sheet B	1	2	3	4	5	6	7	8	9	10	Final
China (Wang)	1	0	0	1	0	0	3	0	0	1	6
Denmark (Jensen)	0	0	1	0	1	0	0	0	1	0	3

Player Percentages
China		Denmark	
Zhou Yan	78%	Camilla Jensen	89%
Yue Qingshuang	88%	Angelina Jensen	84%
Liu Yin	89%	Denise Dupont	84%
Wang Bingyu	88%	Madeleine Dupont	74%
Total	85%	Total	83%

=== 3 vs. 4 ===
March 28, 2009 1400

Sheet B	1	2	3	4	5	6	7	8	9	10	11	Final
Canada (Jones)	0	1	0	0	1	0	1	0	0	1	0	4
Sweden (Norberg)	0	0	0	0	0	1	0	1	2	0	1	5

Player Percentages
Canada		Sweden	
Dawn Askin	82%	Margaretha Sigfridsson	80%
Jill Officer	84%	Cathrine Lindahl	91%
Cathy Overton-Clapham	75%	Eva Lund	84%
Jennifer Jones	86%	Anette Norberg	83%
Total	82%	Total	84%

=== Semifinal ===
March 28, 2009 1900

Sheet B	1	2	3	4	5	6	7	8	9	10	Final
Denmark (Jensen)	1	0	0	2	1	0	0	2	0	0	6
Sweden (Norberg)	0	2	2	0	0	0	2	0	0	1	7

Player Percentages
Denmark		Sweden	
Camilla Jensen	84%	Margaretha Sigfridsson	75%
Angelina Jensen	70%	Cathrine Lindahl	74%
Denise Dupont	76%	Eva Lund	74%
Madeleine Dupont	73%	Anette Norberg	75%
Total	76%	Total	74%

=== Bronze medal game ===
March 29, 2009 1000

Sheet B	1	2	3	4	5	6	7	8	9	10	Final
Canada (Jones)	0	1	0	1	0	1	0	2	1	0	6
Denmark (Jensen)	1	0	1	0	3	0	1	0	0	1	7

Player Percentages
Canada		Denmark	
Dawn Askin	93%	Camilla Jensen	85%
Jill Officer	90%	Angelina Jensen	93%
Cathy Overton-Clapham	79%	Denise Dupont	83%
Jennifer Jones	81%	Madeleine Dupont	85%
Total	86%	Total	86%

=== Gold medal game ===
March 29, 2009 1500

Sheet B	1	2	3	4	5	6	7	8	9	10	Final
China (Wang)	1	0	0	2	0	2	0	2	0	1	8
Sweden (Norberg)	0	1	0	0	1	0	2	0	2	0	6

Player Percentages
China		Sweden	
Zhou Yan	90%	Margaretha Sigfridsson	88%
Yue Qingshuang	81%	Cathrine Lindahl	85%
Liu Yin	81%	Eva Lund	76%
Wang Bingyu	84%	Anette Norberg	88%
Total	84%	Total	84%

2009 Mount Titlis World Women's Curling Championship Winners
(China)
China
1st title

== Player percentages ==
Top five percentages per position during the round robin.

Leads	%	Seconds	%	Thirds	%	Skips	%
(United States) Natalie Nicholson	88	(Canada) Jill Officer	83	(Sweden) Eva Lund	83	(Canada) Jennifer Jones	81
(Canada) Dawn Askin	87	(United States) Nicole Joraanstad	83	(Canada) Cathy Overton-Clapham	82	(Switzerland) Mirjam Ott	79
(China) Zhou Yan	86	(Russia) Nkeiruka Ezekh	81	(Russia) Olga Jarkova	82	(Scotland) Eve Muirhead	79
(Switzerland) Janine Greiner	85	(China) Yue Qingshuang	80	(Denmark) Denise Dupont	81	(Denmark) Madeleine Dupont	78
(Russia) Ekaterina Galkina	85	(Denmark) Angelina Jensen	79	(China) Liu Yin	80	(Germany) Andrea Schöpp	77
