= 2008 Pacific Curling Championships =

- Host city: Naseby, New Zealand
- Arena: Naseby Indoor Curling Rink
- Dates: 2–9 November
- Men's winner: China
- Skip: Wang Fengchun
- Third: Liu Rui
- Second: Xu Xiaoming
- Lead: Zang Jialiang
- Alternate: Chen Lu'an
- Finalist: Japan (Yusuke Morozumi)
- Women's winner: China
- Skip: Wang Bingyu
- Third: Liu Yin
- Second: Yue Qingshuang
- Lead: Zhou Yan
- Alternate: Liu Jinli
- Finalist: South Korea (Kim Mi-yeon)

The 2008 Pacific Curling Championships took place in Naseby, New Zealand from 2–9 November 2008. The top two finishers of the men's event competed in the 2009 Ford World Men's Curling Championship, while women's winner China and host country South Korea competed in the 2009 World Women's Curling Championship, with China winning its first world title.

== Men ==
=== Teams ===
Australia	China	Chinese Taipei
Fourth: Ian Palangio Skip: Hugh Millikin; Second: Sean Hall; Lead: Stephen Johns; Alternate: Stephen Hewitt	Skip: Wang Fengchun Third: Liu Rui; Second: Xu Xiaoming; Lead: Zang Jialiang; Alternate: Chen Lu'an	Skip: Brendon Liu Third: Nicholas Hsu; Second: Ting-Li Lin; Lead: Steve Koo
Japan	South Korea	New Zealand
Skip: Yūsuke Morozumi Third: Tsuyoshi Yamaguchi; Second: Tetsurō Shimizu; Lead: Kōsuke Morozumi; Alternate: Shota Iino	Skip: Lee Dong-keun Third: Kim Soo-hyuk; Second: Park Jong-duk; Lead: Nam Yoon-ho; Alternate: Lee Kyn-heon	Skip: Sean Becker Third: Scott Becker; Second: Rupert Jones; Lead: Warren Dobson; Alternate: Warren Kearney

=== Round Robin Standings ===
Country	Skip	Wins	Losses
South Korea	Lee Dong-keun	7	3
China	Wang Fengchun	7	3
New Zealand	Sean Becker	7	3
Japan	Yusuke Morozumi	5	5
Australia	Hugh Millikin	4	6
Chinese Taipei	Brendon Liu	0	10

=== Round Robin results ===
==== Draw 1 ====
Sunday, 2 November 12:30

Sheet A	1	2	3	4	5	6	7	8	9	10	Final
Japan (Morozumi)	0	0	1	0	1	0	0	2	0	X	4
New Zealand (Becker)	1	0	0	1	0	2	1	0	1	X	6

Sheet B	1	2	3	4	5	6	7	8	9	10	Final
South Korea (Lee)	1	1	0	0	0	0	0	2	0	1	5
Australia (Millikin)	0	0	0	0	2	0	1	0	1	0	4

Sheet C	1	2	3	4	5	6	7	8	9	10	Final
China (Wang)	3	1	5	0	0	0	4	X	X	X	13
Chinese Taipei (Liu)	0	0	0	1	2	0	0	X	X	X	3

==== Draw 2 ====
Sunday, 2 November 20:30

Sheet B	1	2	3	4	5	6	7	8	9	10	Final
New Zealand (Becker)	1	0	0	3	2	0	1	0	0	2	9
China (Wang)	0	1	1	0	0	2	0	3	1	0	8

Sheet C	1	2	3	4	5	6	7	8	9	10	Final
Japan (Morozumi)	0	0	0	2	1	0	0	1	X	X	4
Australia (Millikin)	2	3	2	0	0	1	0	0	X	X	8

Sheet D	1	2	3	4	5	6	7	8	9	10	Final
South Korea (Lee)	2	3	1	0	4	3	X	X	X	X	13
Chinese Taipei (Liu)	0	0	0	1	0	0	X	X	X	X	1

==== Draw 3 ====
Monday, 3 November 12:00

Sheet A	1	2	3	4	5	6	7	8	9	10	Final
South Korea (Lee)	0	2	3	0	0	2	0	1	X	X	8
China (Wang)	0	0	0	1	0	0	2	0	X	X	3

Sheet C	1	2	3	4	5	6	7	8	9	10	11	Final
Chinese Taipei (Liu)	2	0	1	0	0	2	0	1	0	1	0	7
Japan (Morozumi)	0	3	0	1	0	0	0	0	3	0	1	8

Sheet D	1	2	3	4	5	6	7	8	9	10	Final
New Zealand (Becker)	1	0	1	0	0	2	1	0	2	1	8
Australia (Millikin)	0	2	0	3	1	0	0	1	0	0	7

==== Draw 4 ====
Monday, 3 November 20:00

Sheet A	1	2	3	4	5	6	7	8	9	10	Final
New Zealand (Becker)	2	0	1	3	3	0	X	X	X	X	9
Chinese Taipei (Liu)	0	1	0	0	0	1	X	X	X	X	2

Sheet C	1	2	3	4	5	6	7	8	9	10	Final
Australia (Millikin)	0	0	0	0	2	0	0	0	0	X	2
China (Wang)	1	0	0	0	0	1	1	1	1	X	5

Sheet D	1	2	3	4	5	6	7	8	9	10	Final
Japan (Morozumi)	0	3	0	4	0	1	1	0	1	X	10
South Korea (Lee)	1	0	1	0	1	0	0	3	0	X	6

==== Draw 5 ====
Tuesday, 4 November 14:30

Sheet A	1	2	3	4	5	6	7	8	9	10	Final
China (Wang)	0	1	2	0	3	0	1	0	1	X	8
Japan (Morozumi)	0	0	0	2	0	1	0	1	0	X	4

Sheet B	1	2	3	4	5	6	7	8	9	10	Final
Australia (Millikin)	3	1	0	3	0	1	0	2	X	X	10
Chinese Taipei (Liu)	0	0	1	0	1	0	1	0	X	X	3

Sheet C	1	2	3	4	5	6	7	8	9	10	Final
New Zealand (Becker)	2	0	0	0	0	2	0	0	0	0	4
South Korea (Lee)	0	2	0	0	2	0	0	0	0	2	6

==== Draw 6 ====
Wednesday, 5 November 08:00

Sheet A	1	2	3	4	5	6	7	8	9	10	Final
Australia (Millikin)	0	1	0	0	0	1	0	0	1	X	3
South Korea (Lee)	1	0	0	2	0	0	0	2	0	X	5

Sheet B	1	2	3	4	5	6	7	8	9	10	Final
New Zealand (Becker)	0	2	0	3	0	1	0	2	0	1	9
Japan (Morozumi)	0	0	1	0	2	0	2	0	2	0	7

Sheet D	1	2	3	4	5	6	7	8	9	10	Final
Chinese Taipei (Liu)	1	0	0	1	0	0	1	0	X	X	3
China (Wang)	0	1	2	0	0	5	0	4	X	X	12

==== Draw 7 ====
Wednesday, 5 November 16:00

Sheet A	1	2	3	4	5	6	7	8	9	10	Final
China (Wang)	2	0	1	0	0	2	1	0	2	1	9
New Zealand (Becker)	0	2	0	2	1	0	0	2	0	0	7

Sheet C	1	2	3	4	5	6	7	8	9	10	Final
Chinese Taipei (Liu)	0	0	1	0	1	1	0	0	X	X	3
South Korea (Lee)	3	0	0	3	0	0	1	2	X	X	9

Sheet D	1	2	3	4	5	6	7	8	9	10	Final
Australia (Millikin)	2	1	1	1	0	2	0	X	X	X	7
Japan (Morozumi)	0	0	0	0	1	0	1	X	X	X	2

==== Draw 8 ====
Thursday, 6 November 10:00

Sheet A	1	2	3	4	5	6	7	8	9	10	Final
Japan (Morozumi)	1	1	0	2	0	4	0	X	X	X	8
Chinese Taipei (Liu)	0	0	1	0	1	0	0	X	X	X	2

Sheet B	1	2	3	4	5	6	7	8	9	10	Final
China (Wang)	1	0	0	3	2	0	0	4	X	X	10
South Korea (Lee)	0	2	0	0	0	1	1	0	X	X	4

Sheet C	1	2	3	4	5	6	7	8	9	10	Final
Australia (Millikin)	1	0	0	0	0	1	0	0	0	X	2
New Zealand (Becker)	0	1	0	2	1	0	1	1	1	X	7

==== Draw 9 ====
Thursday, 6 November 19:00

Sheet B	1	2	3	4	5	6	7	8	9	10	Final
Chinese Taipei (Liu)	1	0	0	0	1	0	1	X	X	X	3
New Zealand (Becker)	0	2	1	4	0	1	0	X	X	X	8

Sheet C	1	2	3	4	5	6	7	8	9	10	Final
South Korea (Lee)	0	1	0	3	0	1	0	1	0	0	6
Japan (Morozumi)	2	0	3	0	1	0	1	0	0	1	8

Sheet D	1	2	3	4	5	6	7	8	9	10	Final
China (Wang)	0	1	0	2	0	1	0	0	4	X	8
Australia (Millikin)	0	0	2	0	0	0	0	2	0	X	4

==== Draw 10 ====
Friday, 7 November 12:00

Sheet A	1	2	3	4	5	6	7	8	9	10	Final
Chinese Taipei (Liu)	1	0	1	0	1	0	1	0	X	X	4
Australia (Millikin)	0	4	0	1	0	3	0	3	X	X	11

Sheet B	1	2	3	4	5	6	7	8	9	10	Final
Japan (Morozumi)	2	0	0	0	1	0	2	0	0	1	6
China (Wang)	0	2	1	0	0	1	0	1	0	0	5

Sheet D	1	2	3	4	5	6	7	8	9	10	Final
South Korea (Lee)	0	1	0	1	1	1	0	0	0	1	5
New Zealand (Becker)	0	0	1	0	0	0	0	1	1	0	3

=== Playoffs ===
There was a best of 5 series for the semi-finals.

Semi-final
1	South Korea	2 games
4	Japan	3 games
2	China	3 games
3	New Zealand	1 game

Final
4	Japan	5
2	China	8
Bronze medal
1	South Korea	6
3	New Zealand	7

==== Semifinals ====
===== Game 1 =====
Saturday, 8 November 09:00

Sheet C	1	2	3	4	5	6	7	8	9	10	Final
South Korea (Lee)	0	0	1	0	0	1	3	0	0	2	7
Japan (Morozumi)	1	0	0	2	1	0	0	1	0	0	5

Sheet D	1	2	3	4	5	6	7	8	9	10	Final
China (Wang)	2	0	0	3	0	3	0	1	X	X	8
New Zealand (Becker)	0	1	0	0	1	0	1	0	X	X	3

===== Game 2 =====
Saturday, 8 November 14:00

Sheet C	1	2	3	4	5	6	7	8	9	10	Final
China (Wang)	0	0	1	0	2	1	0	1	1	2	8
New Zealand (Becker)	0	1	0	2	0	0	2	0	0	0	5

Sheet D	1	2	3	4	5	6	7	8	9	10	Final
South Korea (Lee)	2	0	1	0	0	0	1	0	3	X	7
Japan (Morozumi)	0	1	0	1	2	0	0	1	0	X	5

===== Game 3 =====
Saturday, 8 November 19:00

Sheet D	1	2	3	4	5	6	7	8	9	10	Final
South Korea (Lee)	0	2	1	0	0	0	0	1	0	X	4
Japan (Morozumi)	1	0	0	4	1	0	0	0	1	X	7

==== Bronze Medal Game ====
Sunday, 9 November 12:00

Sheet D	1	2	3	4	5	6	7	8	9	10	11	Final
South Korea (Lee)	0	1	0	0	0	3	1	0	0	1	0	6
New Zealand (Becker)	1	0	1	1	1	0	0	1	1	0	1	7

==== Gold Medal Game ====
Sunday, 9 November 12:00

Sheet C	1	2	3	4	5	6	7	8	9	10	Final
Japan (Morozumi)	0	0	2	0	1	0	2	0	0	0	5
China (Wang)	1	1	0	1	0	3	0	1	0	1	8

== Women's ==
=== Teams ===
Australia	China	Japan	South Korea	New Zealand
Skip: Kim Forge Third: Sandy Gagnon; Second: Lynette Kate Gill; Lead: Laurie Weeden; Alternate: Madeleine Kate Wilson	Skip: Wang Bingyu Third: Liu Yin; Second: Yue Qingshuang; Lead: Zhou Yan; Alternate: Liu Jinli	Skip: Moe Meguro Third: Mari Motohashi; Second: Mayo Yamaura; Lead: Kotomi Ishizaki; Alternate: Anna Ōmiya	Skip: Kim Mi-yeon Third: Shin Mi-sung; Second: Lee Hyun-jung; Lead: Park Kyung-mi; Alternate: Lee Seul-bee	Skip: Bridget Becker Third: Brydie Donald; Second: Marisa Jones; Lead: Catherine Inder; Alternate: Cassie Becker

=== Round Robin Standings ===
Country	Skip	Wins	Losses
China	Wang Bingyu	7	1
Japan	Moe Meguro	6	2
South Korea	Kim Mi-yeon	4	4
New Zealand	Bridget Becker	3	5
Australia	Kim Forge	0	8

=== Round Robin results ===
==== Draw 1 ====
Sunday, 2 November 16:30

Sheet B	1	2	3	4	5	6	7	8	9	10	Final
China (Wang)	1	0	2	0	1	2	0	0	1	X	7
South Korea (Kim)	0	2	0	2	0	0	1	0	0	X	5

Sheet C	1	2	3	4	5	6	7	8	9	10	Final
Australia (Forge)	0	2	0	0	1	1	0	1	0	X	5
Japan (Meguro)	0	0	2	3	0	0	1	0	1	X	7

==== Draw 2 ====
Monday, 3 November 08:00

Sheet A	1	2	3	4	5	6	7	8	9	10	11	Final
China (Wang)	3	0	0	1	0	0	1	0	1	1	1	8
Japan (Meguro)	0	2	1	0	1	1	0	2	0	0	0	7

Sheet B	1	2	3	4	5	6	7	8	9	10	Final
New Zealand (Becker)	2	0	1	1	3	0	4	0	2	X	13
Australia (Forge)	0	1	0	0	0	1	0	1	0	X	3

==== Draw 3 ====
Monday, 3 November 16:00

Sheet B	1	2	3	4	5	6	7	8	9	10	Final
South Korea (Kim)	1	0	1	0	1	0	1	0	1	X	5
Japan (Meguro)	0	2	0	1	0	2	0	3	0	X	8

Sheet C	1	2	3	4	5	6	7	8	9	10	Final
China (Wang)	4	0	2	1	0	2	1	3	X	X	13
New Zealand (Becker)	0	1	0	0	1	0	0	0	X	X	2

==== Draw 4 ====
Tuesday, 4 November 10:00

Sheet A	1	2	3	4	5	6	7	8	9	10	Final
South Korea (Kim)	2	0	2	0	4	1	2	0	X	X	11
New Zealand (Becker)	0	2	0	1	0	0	0	1	X	X	4

Sheet B	1	2	3	4	5	6	7	8	9	10	Final
Australia (Forge)	2	0	1	0	0	1	0	1	1	X	6
China (Wang)	0	1	0	3	0	0	4	0	0	X	8

==== Draw 5 ====
Tuesday, 4 November 19:00

Sheet B	1	2	3	4	5	6	7	8	9	10	Final
Japan (Meguro)	3	0	1	2	0	4	0	0	1	X	11
New Zealand (Becker)	0	2	0	0	1	0	1	1	0	X	5

Sheet C	1	2	3	4	5	6	7	8	9	10	Final
South Korea (Kim)	0	2	0	3	0	5	3	0	X	X	13
Australia (Forge)	3	0	1	0	1	0	0	0	X	X	5

==== Draw 6 ====
Wednesday, 5 November 12:00

Sheet A	1	2	3	4	5	6	7	8	9	10	Final
Japan (Meguro)	2	2	0	1	1	2	1	X	X	X	9
Australia (Forge)	0	0	0	0	0	0	0	X	X	X	0

Sheet C	1	2	3	4	5	6	7	8	9	10	Final
South Korea (Kim)	1	0	1	0	0	0	0	1	0	X	3
China (Wang)	0	2	0	1	1	1	2	0	1	X	8

==== Draw 7 ====
Wednesday, 5 November 20:00

Sheet B	1	2	3	4	5	6	7	8	9	10	Final
Japan (Meguro)	1	0	2	1	0	1	1	0	1	0	7
China (Wang)	0	1	0	0	1	0	0	1	0	1	4

Sheet A	1	2	3	4	5	6	7	8	9	10	11	Final
Australia (Forge)	1	0	1	1	1	1	0	2	0	0	0	7
New Zealand (Becker)	0	0	0	0	0	0	3	0	3	1	1	8

==== Draw 8 ====
Thursday, 6 November 14:30

Sheet A	1	2	3	4	5	6	7	8	9	10	Final
New Zealand (Becker)	1	0	1	0	2	0	0	0	2	0	6
China (Wang)	0	3	0	1	0	1	0	1	0	1	7

Sheet C	1	2	3	4	5	6	7	8	9	10	11	Final
Japan (Meguro)	0	0	1	1	0	2	0	1	0	2	0	7
South Korea (Kim)	0	3	0	0	1	0	2	0	1	0	2	9

==== Draw 9 ====
Friday, 7 November 08:00

Sheet B	1	2	3	4	5	6	7	8	9	10	Final
New Zealand (Becker)	1	0	0	1	3	0	2	0	5	X	12
South Korea (Kim)	0	0	4	0	0	2	0	3	0	X	9

Sheet C	1	2	3	4	5	6	7	8	9	10	Final
China (Wang)	1	0	0	4	0	1	0	3	0	X	9
Australia (Forge)	0	0	1	0	1	0	1	0	1	X	4

==== Draw 10 ====
Friday, 7 November 16:00

Sheet A	1	2	3	4	5	6	7	8	9	10	Final
Australia (Forge)	0	0	0	0	1	0	X	X	X	X	1
South Korea (Kim)	1	0	5	1	0	3	X	X	X	X	10

Sheet C	1	2	3	4	5	6	7	8	9	10	Final
New Zealand (Becker)	0	1	0	3	0	3	0	1	0	0	8
Japan (Meguro)	3	0	1	0	2	0	3	0	1	1	11

=== Playoffs ===
Semifinal			Final
			1	China	9
2	Japan	6	3	South Korea	4
3	South Korea	9

The winner of the semifinals would go on to face China in the Gold Medal Game; the loser would receive the bronze medal.

==== Semifinals ====
Saturday, 8 November 09:00

Sheet A	1	2	3	4	5	6	7	8	9	10	Final
Japan (Meguro)	0	0	0	2	0	3	0	0	1	0	6
South Korea (Kim)	0	0	2	0	3	0	1	1	0	2	9

==== Gold Medal Game ====
Sunday, 9 November 12:00

Sheet B	1	2	3	4	5	6	7	8	9	10	Final
China (Wang)	0	1	2	0	0	1	2	1	2	X	9
South Korea (Kim)	3	0	0	1	0	0	0	0	0	X	4
