= Shin Mi-sung =

South Korean curler

- Curler
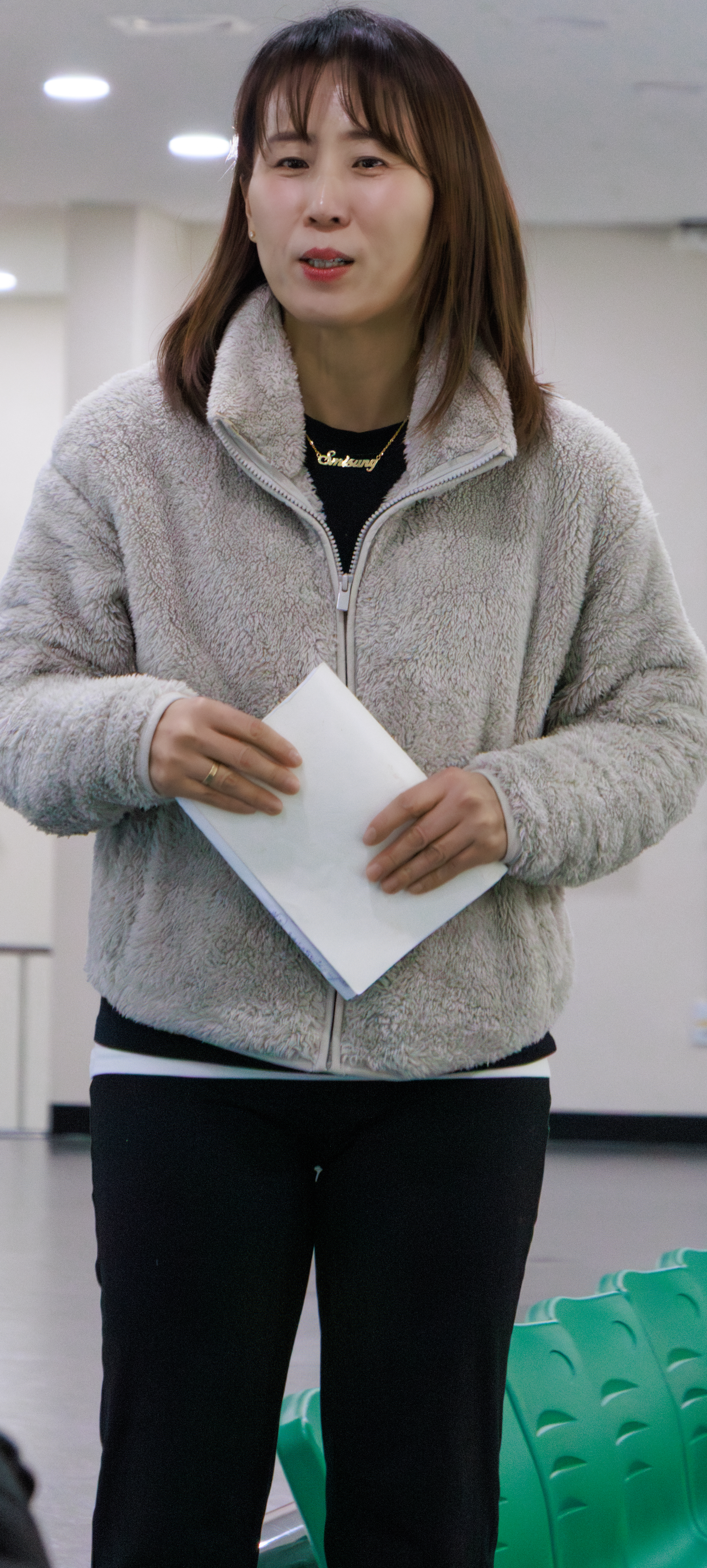
- Born: April 15, 1978 (age 48); Seoul, South Korea

Team
- Curling club: Gyeonggi-do CC, Gyeonggi-do

Curling career
- Member Association: South Korea
- World Championship: 5 (2002, 2009, 2011, 2012, 2014)
- Pacific-Asia Championship: 10 (1998, 2001, 2002, 2003, 2004, 2007, 2008, 2010, 2011, 2013)
- Olympic: 1 (2014)
Medal record
Women's curling
Representing South Korea
Pacific-Asia Championships
Gold medal – first place	2001 Jeonju
Gold medal – first place	2010 Uiseong
Gold medal – first place	2013 Shanghai
Silver medal – second place	2002 Queenstown
Silver medal – second place	2003 Aomori
Silver medal – second place	2008 Naseby
Silver medal – second place	2011 Nanjing
Bronze medal – third place	2004 Chuncheon
Bronze medal – third place	2007 Beijing
Representing Gyeonggi
Korean Women's Championship
Gold medal – first place	2011 Uijeongbu
Gold medal – first place	2013 Chuncheon
Bronze medal – third place	2012 Uijeongbu

- Shin Mi-sung
- Hangul: 신미성
- RR: Sin Miseong
- MR: Sin Misŏng

Shin Mi-sung (born April 15, 1978) is a South Korean curler who competed at the 2014 Winter Olympics for South Korea.

== Career ==
Shin was born in Seoul, South Korea, and competed at the 2014 Winter Olympics for South Korea. She teamed with Kim Ji-sun, Lee Seul-bee, Gim Un-chi and Um Min-ji in the women's tournament. She began the tournament playing second, but ended up playing only four of the nine games, as the South Korean team went 3-6 to finish in a tie for 8th. She curled 73%, which was 9th out of the 10 seconds.

Shin made her World Curling Championships debut in 2002 as second for Kim Mi-yeon. It was the first time the South Korean team qualified for a World Championship. They finished with a winless 0–9 record. In 2009, the Kim Mi-yeon team went 3–6. Her other three appearances were with the Kim Ji-sun rink with whom she went to the Olympics with. Their best finish was fourth place finishes at both the 2012 and 2014 Championships.

As of 2014, Shin has participated in 10 Pacific-Asia Curling Championships, winning the event on three occasions.

== Education ==
- Sungshin Women's University
