= Lee Dong-keun (curler) =

South Korean curler

- Curler
- Born: September 10, 1979 (age 47); Daegu, South Korea

Team
- Curling club: Uiseong CC, Uiseong, KOR

Curling career
- Member Association: South Korea
- World Championship: 2 (2003, 2011)
- Pacific-Asia Championship: 5 (2001, 2002, 2003, 2008, 2010)
Medal record
Men's curling
Representing South Korea
Pacific-Asia Championships
| Gold medal – first place | 2002 Queenstown |
| Silver medal – second place | 2010 Uiseong |
| Bronze medal – third place | 2003 Aomori |
Asian Winter Games
| Gold medal – first place | 2003 Aomori |
Winter Universiade
| Bronze medal – third place | 2003 Tarvisio |

- Lee Dong-keun
- Hangul: 이동건
- RR: I Donggeon
- MR: I Tonggŏn

Lee Dong-keun (Korean: 이동건; born September 10, 1979) is a South Korean curler and curling coach from Gyeongbuk. He currently coaches the Uiseong-gun Office (Lee Jae-beom) rink. He is a former Pacific Curling champion and has twice skipped Korea at the World Curling Championships.

== Career ==
Lee has played in five Pacific Curling Championships. He won a gold medal in 2002, in his second event, defeating Australia's Hugh Millikin in the final. It was an improvement from the 4th-place finish Lee had in 2001. At the 2003 World University Games, Lee's Korean rink picked up a bronze medal. Later in the season, Lee represented Korea for the first time at the World Championships, by virtue of winning the Pacific region in 2002. At the 2003 Ford World Men's Curling Championship, Korea finished in last place. The following season he won a bronze medal at the Pacific curling championships.

Lee did not play internationally for five years, before finishing 4th at the 2008 Pacific Curling Championships. Two years later he won a silver medal at the 2010 Pacific Curling Championships, losing to China's Wang Fengchun in the final. This qualified Lee for his second World championship, to be played in 2011.

== Personal life ==
Lee was once a bowler, but made the transition to curling in 1998 upon the recommendation of a friend.
