= 2003 Pacific Curling Championships =

- Host city: Aomori, Japan
- Dates: November 23–29
- Men's winner: New Zealand
- Skip: Sean Becker
- Third: Hans Frauenlob
- Second: Jim Allan
- Lead: Lorne De Pape
- Alternate: Warren Dobson
- Coach: Peter Becker
- Finalist: Australia (Hugh Millikin)
- Women's winner: Japan
- Skip: Shinobu Aota
- Third: Yukari Okazaki
- Second: Eriko Minatoya
- Lead: Kotomi Ishizaki
- Alternate: Mari Motohashi
- Coach: Fuji Miki & Itaru Fujiwara
- Finalist: South Korea (Kim Mi-yeon)

The 2003 Pacific Curling Championships were held in Aomori, Japan November 23 to 29.

New Zealand's Sean Becker won the men's event over Australia's Hugh Millikin. On the women's side, Japan's Shinobu Aota defeated South Korea's Kim Mi-yeon in the final.

By virtue of winning, the New Zealand men's team and the Japanese women's team qualified for the 2004 World Men's and Women's Curling Championships in Gävle, Sweden.

== Men's ==
=== Final round-robin standings ===
Country	Skip	W	L
South Korea	Lee Dong-keun	5	0
Australia	Hugh Millikin	3	2
Japan	Hiroaki Kashiwagi	3	2
New Zealand	Sean Becker	3	2
China	Wang Haicheng	1	4
Chinese Taipei	Niscolas Hsu	0	5

=== Playoffs ===
Semifinals
1	South Korea	5	3	–
4	New Zealand	6	6	–
2	Australia	6	6	10
3	Japan	7	3	5

Finals
4	New Zealand	6
2	Australia	5
Bronze medal
1	South Korea	11
3	Japan	4

== Women's ==
=== Final round-robin standings ===
Country	Skip	W	L
Japan	Shinobu Aota	5	0
Australia	Helen Wright	4	1
South Korea	Kim Mi-yeon	3	2
New Zealand	Bridget Becker	1	4
China	Song Kelu	1	4
Chinese Taipei	Li-Lin Cheng	1	4

=== Tiebreakers ===
- China 11-8 Chinese Taipei
- New Zealand 14-5 China

=== Playoffs ===
Semifinals
1	Japan	14	11	–
4	New Zealand	1	5	–
2	Australia	4	4	–
3	South Korea	9	11	–

Finals
1	Japan	7
3	South Korea	3
Bronze medal
2	Australia	3
4	New Zealand	13
