= Ma Yanlong =

Chinese curler

- Curler
- Born: 26 March 1990 (age 36)

Curling career
- World Championship: 1 (2018)
- World Mixed Doubles Championship: 2 (2013, 2018)
- Pacific-Asia Championship: 1 (2017)
- Other appearances: Winter Universiade: 1 (2013)
Medal record
Curling
Representing China
Pacific-Asia Curling Championships
Silver medal – second place	2017 Erina

Ma Yanlong (born March 26, 1990) is a Chinese male curler. He played on third position for China on 2013 Winter Universiade.

== Teams and events ==
=== Men's ===
Season	Skip	Third	Second	Lead	Alternate	Coach	Events
2013	Ma Xiuyue	Ma Yanlong	Xiao Shicheng	Wang Jinbo	Pan Jiaqi	Liu Chun Hua	WUG 2013 (9th)
2017–18	Zou Dejia	Zou Qiang	Xu Jingtao	Shao Zhilin	Ma Yanlong	Marcel Rocque	PACC 2017 (silver); WMCC 2018 (12th)
2017–18	Ma Xiuyue	Ma Yanlong	Wang Jinbo	Wang Jingyuan			
2017–18	Liu Rui	Xu Xiaoming	Jiang Dongxu	Zang Jialiang	Ma Yanlong	Marcel Rocque	OQE 2017 (5th)
2018–19	Zang Jialiang	Ba Dexin	Ma Yanlong	Wang Jinbo		Daniel Rafael	CWC 2018–19/1 (7th)

=== Mixed doubles ===
Season	Male	Female	Coach	Events
2012–13	Ma Yanlong	Yu Xinna	Tan Weidong	WMDCC 2013 (13th)
2017–18	Ma Yanlong	Fu Yiwei	Zhang Wei	WMDCC 2018 (13th)
