= 2014 Curlers Corner Autumn Gold Curling Classic =

- Host city: Calgary, Alberta
- Arena: Calgary Curling Club
- Dates: October 10–13
- Winner: (Manitoba) Jennifer Jones
- Curling club: St. Vital CC, Winnipeg
- Skip: Jennifer Jones
- Third: Kaitlyn Lawes
- Second: Jill Officer
- Lead: Dawn McEwen
- Finalist: (Ontario) Rachel Homan

The 2014 Curlers Corner Autumn Gold Curling Classic was held from October 10 to 13 at the Calgary Curling Club in Calgary, Alberta. The event was the first women's Grand Slam of the 2014–15 World Curling Tour. The event was a triple knockout format, and the purse for the event was CAD$50,000.

The reigning Olympic champion Jennifer Jones rink from Winnipeg defeated the reigning Canadian champion Rachel Homan rink from Ottawa in the final. The win gave Jones a record 11th career Grand Slam title.

== Teams ==
The teams are listed as follows:

Skip	Third	Second	Lead	Locale	WCT Order of Merit Rank
Sherry Anderson	Sherri Singler	Ashley Howard	Stephanie McVicar	Saskatoon, Saskatchewan	10
Cathy Auld	Julie Reddick	Holly Donaldson	Carly Howard	Toronto, Ontario	54
Chelsea Carey	Laura Crocker	Taylor McDonald	Jen Gates	Edmonton, Alberta	15
Delia DeJong	Amy Janko	Janais DeJong	Mikki Redlick	Grande Prairie, Alberta	110
Tanilla Doyle	Lindsey Amundsen-Meyer	Logan Conway	Christina Faulkner	Calgary, Alberta	121
Chantelle Eberle	Cindy Ricci	Larisa Murray	Debbie Lozinski	Regina, Saskatchewan	24
Satsuki Fujisawa	Emi Shimizu	Chiaki Matsumura	Ikue Kitazawa	Nagano, Japan	60
Kerry Galusha	Megan Cormier	Danielle Derry	Shona Barbour	Yellowknife, Northwest Territories	132
Tiffany Game	Vanessa Pouliot	Jennifer Van Wieren	Melissa Pierce	Edmonton, Alberta	104
Teryn Hamilton	Kalynn Park	Shana Snell	Sandi Weber	Calgary, Alberta	116
Amber Holland	Cathy Overton-Clapham	Sasha Carter	Chelsey Matson	Regina, Saskatchewan	28
Rachel Homan	Emma Miskew	Joanne Courtney	Lisa Weagle	Ottawa, Ontario	2
Tracy Horgan	Jenn Horgan	Jenna Enge	Amanda Gates	Sudbury, Ontario	34
Jennifer Jones	Kaitlyn Lawes	Jill Officer	Dawn McEwen	Winnipeg, Manitoba	1
Kim Eun-jung	Kim Kyeong-ae	Kim Seon-yeong	Kim Yeong-mi	Uiseong, South Korea	19
Kim Ji-sun	Gim Un-chi	Lee Seul-bee	Um Min-ji	Gyeonggi-do, South Korea	13
Shannon Kleibrink	Lisa Eyamie	Nikki Smith	Darah Bladford	Calgary, Alberta	112
Sarah Koltun	Chelsea Duncan	Patty Wallingham	Jenna Duncan	Whitehorse, Yukon	69
Liu Sijia	Wang Rui	Liu Jinli	Yu Xinna	Harbin, China	58
Mayu Minami	Mizuki Kitaguchi	Mayu Natsuizaka	Mari Ikawa	Sapporo, Japan	195
Kristie Moore	Sarah Wilkes	Kristina Hadden	Alison Kotylak	Edmonton, Alberta	61
Mari Motohashi	Chinami Yoshida	Yumi Suzuki	Yurika Yoshida	Kitami, Japan	65
Heather Nedohin	Amy Nixon	Jessica Mair	Laine Peters	Edmonton, Alberta	12
Susan O'Connor	Lawnie MacDonald	Denise Kinghorn	Cori Morris	Calgary, Alberta	18
Ayumi Ogasawara	Sayaka Yoshimura	Kaho Onodera	Anna Ohmiya	Sapporo, Japan	21
Cecilia Östlund	Sabina Kraupp	Sara Carlsson	Paulina Stein	Karlstad, Sweden	33
Trish Paulsen	Kari Kennedy	Jenna Loder	Kari Paulsen	Saskatoon, Saskatchewan	41
Casey Scheidegger	Cary-Anne McTaggart	Jessie Scheidegger	Brittany Tran	Lethbridge, Alberta	30
Barb Spencer	Katie Spencer	Holly Spencer	Sydney Arnal	Winnipeg, Manitoba	36
Val Sweeting	Andrea Crawford	Dana Ferguson	Rachelle Pidherny	Edmonton, Alberta	7
Jill Thurston	Brette Richards	Briane Meilleur	Blaine de Jager	Winnipeg, Manitoba	23
Jessie Kaufman (fourth)	Crystal Webster (skip)	Geri-Lynn Ramsay	Rebecca Konschuh	Calgary, Alberta	26

== Knockout results ==
The draw is listed as follows:

=== A event ===
First Knockout
(Manitoba) Jennifer Jones	8
(Japan) Mayu Minami	2
(Alberta) Casey Scheidegger	5
(Japan) Ayumi Ogasawara	7
(Alberta) Susan O'Connor	2
(Alberta) Shannon Kleibrink	5
(Manitoba) Jill Thurston	3
(Japan) Satsuki Fujisawa	4
(Saskatchewan) Sherry Anderson	9
(Alberta) Tiffany Game	1
(Sweden) Cecilia Östlund	8
(Ontario) Cathy Auld	3
(Alberta) Heather Nedohin	9
(Alberta) Tamilla Doyle	3
(Saskatchewan) Chantelle Eberle	8
(China) Liu Sijia	4

Quarterfinals
(Manitoba) Jennifer Jones	7
(Japan) Ayumi Ogasawara	6
(Alberta) Shannon Kleibrink	6
(Japan) Satsuki Fujisawa	4
(Saskatchewan) Sherry Anderson	6
(Sweden) Cecilia Östlund	2
(Alberta) Heather Nedohin	7
(Saskatchewan) Chantelle Eberle	6

Semifinals
(Manitoba) Jennifer Jones	6
(Alberta) Shannon Kleibrink	3
(Saskatchewan) Sherry Anderson	4
(Alberta) Heather Nedohin	5

Qualifier 1
(Manitoba) Jennifer Jones	7
(Alberta) Heather Nedohin	2

First Knockout
(Ontario) Rachel Homan	8
(Northwest Territories) Kerry Galusha	3
(Ontario) Tracy Horgan	5
(Saskatchewan) Trish Paulsen	6
(Alberta) Chelsea Carey	8
(Alberta) Kristie Moore	7
(Alberta) Crystal Webster	6
(Yukon) Sarah Koltun	4
(Alberta) Val Sweeting	6
(Alberta) Teryn Hamilton	1
(South Korea) Kim Eun-jung	5
(Manitoba) Barb Spencer	6
(South Korea) Kim Ji-sun	7
(Alberta) Delia DeJong	1
(Saskatchewan) Amber Holland	3
(Japan) Mari Motohashi	6

Quarterfinals
(Ontario) Rachel Homan	6
(Saskatchewan) Trish Paulsen	2
(Alberta) Chelsea Carey	6
(Alberta) Crystal Webster	3
(Alberta) Val Sweeting	1
(Manitoba) Barb Spencer	6
(South Korea) Kim Ji-sun	5
(Japan) Mari Motohashi	4

Semifinals
(Ontario) Rachel Homan	4
(Alberta) Chelsea Carey	6
(Manitoba) Barb Spencer	4
(South Korea) Kim Ji-sun	3

Qualifier 2
(Alberta) Chelsea Carey	4
(Manitoba) Barb Spencer	5

=== B event ===
Second Knockout
(Japan) Mayu Minami	2
(Alberta) Casey Scheidegger	5
(Manitoba) Jill Thurston	5
(Alberta) Susan O'Connor	3

Quarterfinals
(Japan) Mari Motohashi	5
(Alberta) Casey Scheidegger	8
(Alberta) Val Sweeting	6
(Manitoba) Jill Thurston	4

Semifinals
(Alberta) Casey Scheidegger	1
(Ontario) Rachel Homan	7
(Alberta) Val Sweeting	4
(Saskatchewan) Sherry Anderson	5

To Qualifier 3
(Ontario) Rachel Homan	6
(Saskatchewan) Sherry Anderson	0
Qualifier 3
(Ontario) Rachel Homan	5
(Alberta) Heather Nedohin	2

Second Knockout
(Alberta) Tiffany Game	7
(Ontario) Cathy Auld	4
(Alberta) Tanilla Doyle	3
(China) Liu Sijia	6

Quarterfinals
(Alberta) Crystal Webster	4
(Alberta) Tiffany Game	1
(Saskatchewan) Trish Paulsen	8
(China) Liu Sijia	6

Semifinals
(Alberta) Crystal Webster	3
(Saskatchewan) Trish Paulsen	6

To Qualifier 3
(Saskatchewan) Trish Paulsen	3
(Alberta) Heather Nedohin	4

Second Knockout
(Northwest Territories) Kerry Galusha	5
(Ontario) Tracy Horgan	7
(Alberta) Kristie Moore	3
(Yukon) Sarah Koltun	7

Quarterfinals
(Saskatchewan) Chantelle Eberle	6
(Ontario) Tracy Horgan	8
(Sweden) Cecilia Östlund	4
(Yukon) Sarah Koltun	5

Semifinals
(Ontario) Tracy Horgan	7
(South Korea) Kim Ji-sun	4
(Yukon) Sarah Koltun	5
(Alberta) Shannon Kleibrink	8

To Qualifier 4
(Ontario) Tracy Horgan	7
(Alberta) Shannon Kleibrink	4
Qualifier 4
(Ontario) Tracy Horgan	4
(Japan) Satsuki Fujisawa	6

Second Knockout
(Alberta) Teryn Hamilton	7
(South Korea) Kim Eun-jung	4
(Alberta) Delia DeJong	4
(Saskatchewan) Amber Holland	7

Quarterfinals
(Japan) Satsuki Fujisawa	5
(Alberta) Teryn Hamilton	4
(Japan) Ayumi Ogasawara	8
(Saskatchewan) Amber Holland	3

Semifinals
(Japan) Satsuki Fujisawa	7
(Japan) Ayumi Ogasawara	6

To Qualifier 4
(Japan) Satsuki Fujisawa	7
(Alberta) Chelsea Carey	5

=== C event ===
Third Knockout
(Japan) Mayu Minami	1
(Alberta) Susan O'Connor	6
(Ontario) Cathy Auld	1
(Alberta) Tanilla Doyle	7

Quarterfinals
(South Korea) Kim Ji-sun	4
(Alberta) Susan O'Connor	5
(Yukon) Sarah Koltun	2
(Alberta) Tanilla Doyle	6

Semifinals
(Alberta) Susan O'Connor	6
(Alberta) Tanilla Doyle	1

Qualifier 5
(Alberta) Susan O'Connor	3
(Alberta) Heather Nedohin	5

Third Knockout
(Alberta) Tiffany Game	3
(China) Liu Sijia	5

Quarterfinals
(Japan) Mari Motohashi	4
(Manitoba) Jill Thurston	5
(Japan) Ayumi Ogasawara	5
(China) Liu Sijia	6

Semifinals
(Manitoba) Jill Thurston	5
(Alberta) Chelsea Carey	4
(China) Liu Sijia	5
(Alberta) Shannon Kleibrink	4

Qualifier 6
(Manitoba) Jill Thurston	5
(China) Liu Sijia	3

Third Knockout
(Alberta) Teryn Hamilton	5
(Saskatchewan) Amber Holland	9

Quarterfinals
(Alberta) Crystal Webster	4
(Saskatchewan) Amber Holland	5
(Saskatchewan) Chantelle Eberle	7
(Sweden) Cecilia Östlund	2

Semifinals
(Saskatchewan) Amber Holland	7
(Saskatchewan) Sherry Anderson	5
(Saskatchewan) Chantelle Eberle	4
(Saskatchewan) Trish Paulsen	3

Qualifier 7
(Saskatchewan) Amber Holland	7
(Saskatchewan) Chantelle Eberle	4

Third Knockout
(Northwest Territories) Kerry Galusha	5
(Alberta) Kristie Moore	4
(South Korea) Kim Eun-jung	7
(Alberta) Delia DeJong	8

Quarterfinals
(Alberta) Casey Scheidegger	6
(Northwest Territories) Kerry Galusha	5
(Alberta) Val Sweeting	5
(Alberta) Delia DeJong	3

Semifinals
(Alberta) Casey Scheidegger	2
(Alberta) Val Sweeting	6

Qualifier 8
(Alberta) Val Sweeting	3
(Ontario) Tracy Horgan	4

== Playoffs ==
Quarterfinals
(Manitoba) Jennifer Jones	5
(Manitoba) Jill Thurston	2
(Japan) Satsuki Fujisawa	4
(Alberta) Heather Nedohin	1
(Ontario) Rachel Homan	7
(Ontario) Tracy Horgan	4
(Saskatchewan) Amber Holland	6
(Manitoba) Barb Spencer	4

Semifinals
(Manitoba) Jennifer Jones	6
(Japan) Satsuki Fujisawa	5
(Ontario) Rachel Homan	5
(Saskatchewan) Amber Holland	3

Final
(Manitoba) Jennifer Jones	6
(Ontario) Rachel Homan	5
