= Fu Yiwei (curler) =

Chinese curler

Fu Yiwei 付一玮
- Curler ♀
- Born: March 28, 1997 (age 29); Jilin City, Jilin

Team
- Mixed doubles partner: Zou Dejia

Curling career
- Member Association: China
- World Mixed Doubles Championship: 2 (2018, 2019)
Medal record
Curling

Fu Yiwei (Chinese: 付一玮; pinyin: Fù Yīwěi; born March 28, 1997, in Jilin City, Jilin) is a Chinese female curler.

== Teams ==
=== Women's ===
Season	Skip	Third	Second	Lead	Alternate
2013–14	Dong Ziqi	Jiang Simiao	Wang Ziyue	Fu Yiwei	Wang Zixin
2014–15	Dong Ziqi	Jiang Simiao	Wang Ziyue	Fu Yiwei	Wang Zixin
2014–15	Fu Yiwei	Sun Chengyu	Yang Ying	She Qiutong	Zhang Lijun
2015–16	Dong Ziqi	Jiang Simiao	Fu Yiwei	Zhao Xiyang	Wang Ziyue
2016–17	Zheng Chunmei (fourth)	Mei Jie	Fu Yiwei	Yang Ying (skip)	Yu Xinna
2017–18	Mei Jie	Cao Ying	Fu Yiwei	Yang Ying	

=== Mixed doubles ===
Season	Male	Female	Coach	Events
2017–18	Ma Yanlong	Fu Yiwei	Zhang Wei	WMDCC 2018 (13th)
2018–19	Zou Dejia	Fu Yiwei	Zhang Wei, Zhu Yu	WMDCC 2019 (19th)
