= Curling at the 2013 Winter Universiade =

- Host city: Trentino, Italy
- Arena: Ice Rink Piné, Baselga di Piné
- Dates: December 12–20
- Men's winner: Sweden
- Curling club: Karlstads CK, Karlstad
- Skip: Oskar Eriksson
- Third: Kristian Lindström
- Second: Markus Eriksson
- Lead: Christoffer Sundgren
- Finalist: Great Britain (Kyle Smith)
- Women's winner: Russia
- Curling club: Moskvitch CC, Moscow
- Skip: Anna Sidorova
- Third: Margarita Fomina
- Second: Alexandra Saitova
- Lead: Ekaterina Galkina
- Alternate: Victoria Moiseeva
- Finalist: South Korea (Kim Ji-sun)

Curling at the 2013 Winter Universiade was held from December 12 to 20 at the Ice Rink Piné at Baselga di Piné in Trentino, Italy.

== Medal summary ==
=== Medal table ===
Rank	Nation	Gold	Silver	Bronze	Total
1	Russia (RUS)	1	0	0	1
1	Sweden (SWE)	1	0	0	1
3	Great Britain (GBR)	0	1	0	1
3	South Korea (KOR)	0	1	0	1
5	Canada (CAN)	0	0	1	1
5	Switzerland (SUI)	0	0	1	1
Totals (6 entries)		2	2	2	6

=== Medalists ===
Event	Gold	Silver	Bronze
Men	Sweden (SWE); Oskar Eriksson; Kristian Lindström; Markus Eriksson; Christoffer Sundgren	Great Britain (GBR); Kyle Smith; Thomas Muirhead; Kyle Waddell; Cameron Smith; Derrick Sloan	Canada (CAN); Brendan Bottcher; Mick Lizmore; Brad Thiessen; Karrick Martin; Parker Konschuh
Women	Russia (RUS); Anna Sidorova; Margarita Fomina; Alexandra Saitova; Ekaterina Galkina; Victoria Moiseeva	South Korea (KOR); Kim Ji-sun; Gim Un-chi; Um Min-ji; Lee Seul-bee	Switzerland (SUI); Michèle Jäggi; Marisa Winkelhausen; Melanie Barbezat; Nora Baumann; Corina Mani

== Qualification ==
=== Men ===
Country	2011 WJCC	2011 WMCC	2012 WJCC	2012 WMCC	2013 WJCC	2013 WMCC	Total
Canada	8	14	14	14	10	12	72
Sweden	14	10	12	10	8	14	68
Great Britain	6	12	10	12	14	10	64
Norway	10	9	8	9	6	8	50
Switzerland	12	6	5	4	3	6	36
China	4	4	4	7	2	7	28
United States	5	3	6	5	4	4	27
Czech Republic	2	5	3	1	1	5	17
Denmark	1	1	–	6	–	9	17
Russia	–	–	–	–	12	3	15
France	–	8	–	3	–	–	11
Germany	–	7	–	2	–	–	9
New Zealand	–	–	–	8	–	–	8
Italy	–	–	2	–	5	–	7
Finland	3	–	1	–	–	1	5
Japan	–	–	–	–	–	2	2
South Korea	–	2	–	–	–	–	2

=== Women ===
Country	2011 WJCC	2011 WWCC	2012 WJCC	2012 WWCC	2013 WJCC	2013 WWCC	Total
Great Britain	14	4	14	7	12	14	65
Sweden	8	14	8	12	6	12	60
Russia	10	7	10	4	14	7	52
Canada	12	12	5	10	2	10	51
Switzerland	5	8	3	14	3	8	41
United States	6	6	1	8	4	9	34
Japan	3	–	6	–	10	6	25
Czech Republic	2	1	12	1	8	–	24
Denmark	–	9	–	5	5	5	24
China	–	10	–	2	–	4	16
Germany	–	5	–	6	–	2	13
Norway	4	3	4	–	1	–	12
South Korea	–	2	–	9	–	–	11
Italy	–	–	2	3	–	3	8
France	1	–	–	–	–	–	1
Latvia	–	–	–	–	–	1	1

== Men ==
=== Teams ===
Canada	China	Czech Republic	Great Britain	Italy
Skip: Brendan Bottcher; Third: Mick Lizmore; Second: Brad Thiessen; Lead: Karrick Martin; Alternate: Parker Konschuh	Skip: Ma Xiuyue; Third: Ma Yanlong; Second: Xiao Shicheng; Lead: Wang Jinbo; Alternate: Pan Jiaqi	Skip: Lukáš Klíma; Third: Jiří Candra; Second: Tomáš Paul; Lead: David Jirounek; Alternate: Martin Jurík	Skip: Kyle Smith; Third: Thomas Muirhead; Second: Kyle Waddell; Lead: Cammy Smith; Alternate: Derrick Sloan	Skip: Marco Pascale; Third: Andrea Pilzer; Second: Fabio Sola; Lead: Julien Genre; Alternate: Simone Gonin
South Korea	Norway	Sweden	Switzerland	United States
Skip: Kim Chang-min; Third: Kim Min-chan; Second: Seong Se-hyeon; Lead: Seo Young-seon; Alternate: Oh Eun-su	Skip: Markus Høiberg; Third: Steffen Walstad; Second: Magnus Nedregotten; Lead: Sander Rølvåg; Alternate: Wilhelm Naess	Skip: Oskar Eriksson; Third: Kristian Lindström; Second: Markus Eriksson; Lead: Christoffer Sundgren	Skip: Mario Freiberger; Third: Sven Iten; Second: Rainer Kobler; Lead: Patrick Poli; Alternate: Stefan Meienberg	Skip: Chris Plys; Third: Stephen Dropkin; Second: Sean Beighton; Lead: Korey Dropkin; Alternate: Tom Howell

=== Round-robin standings ===
Final round-robin standings

Key
Teams to Playoffs
Teams to Tiebreaker

Country	Skip	W	L
Sweden	Oskar Eriksson	8	1
Canada	Brendan Bottcher	7	2
Great Britain	Kyle Smith	6	3
Norway	Markus Høiberg	5	4
United States	Chris Plys	5	4
Switzerland	Mario Freiberger	4	5
Czech Republic	Lukas Klima	3	6
South Korea	Kim Chang-min	3	6
China	Ma Xiuyue	2	7
Italy	Marco Pascale	2	7

=== Round-robin results ===
==== Draw 1 ====
Thursday, December 12, 14:00

Sheet A	1	2	3	4	5	6	7	8	9	10	Final
Italy (Pascale) 🔨	1	0	0	2	0	0	1	0	0	2	6
China (Ma)	0	2	0	0	0	3	0	1	1	0	7

Sheet B	1	2	3	4	5	6	7	8	9	10	Final
United States (Plys) 🔨	0	2	2	0	1	0	1	0	0	1	7
Norway (Høiberg)	1	0	0	0	0	2	0	0	1	0	4

Sheet C	1	2	3	4	5	6	7	8	9	10	Final
Czech Republic (Klima) 🔨	0	0	1	0	0	1	0	X	X	X	2
Sweden (Eriksson)	1	0	0	2	0	0	6	X	X	X	9

Sheet D	1	2	3	4	5	6	7	8	9	10	11	Final
Great Britain (Smith)	1	0	1	0	1	0	0	0	0	1	0	4
Canada (Bottcher) 🔨	0	1	0	2	0	1	0	0	0	0	1	5

Sheet E	1	2	3	4	5	6	7	8	9	10	Final
South Korea (Kim)	1	3	0	1	0	0	0	0	4	X	9
Switzerland (Freiberger) 🔨	0	0	2	0	0	1	0	1	0	X	4

==== Draw 2 ====
Friday, December 13, 9:00

Sheet A	1	2	3	4	5	6	7	8	9	10	Final
Norway (Høiberg) 🔨	0	0	0	0	0	1	0	0	X	X	1
Great Britain (Smith)	0	2	0	1	1	0	1	1	X	X	6

Sheet B	1	2	3	4	5	6	7	8	9	10	Final
China (Ma)	0	0	1	0	0	1	0	0	X	X	2
Canada (Bottcher) 🔨	2	0	0	3	1	0	1	3	X	X	10

Sheet C	1	2	3	4	5	6	7	8	9	10	Final
South Korea (Kim) 🔨	2	0	0	2	0	4	0	X	X	X	8
Italy (Pascale)	0	1	1	0	1	0	1	X	X	X	4

Sheet D	1	2	3	4	5	6	7	8	9	10	Final
Switzerland (Freiberger)	0	0	1	1	0	1	0	0	0	X	3
Sweden (Eriksson) 🔨	2	0	0	0	2	0	0	2	3	X	9

Sheet E	1	2	3	4	5	6	7	8	9	10	Final
United States (Plys)	0	3	3	0	2	0	0	2	X	X	10
Czech Republic (Klima) 🔨	2	0	0	1	0	0	1	0	X	X	4

==== Draw 3 ====
Friday, December 13, 19:00

Sheet A	1	2	3	4	5	6	7	8	9	10	Final
Sweden (Eriksson)	0	0	1	0	1	0	0	1	1	X	4
United States (Plys) 🔨	0	1	0	0	0	0	0	0	0	X	1

Sheet B	1	2	3	4	5	6	7	8	9	10	Final
Italy (Pascale) 🔨	2	0	0	3	0	2	0	1	0	2	10
Switzerland (Freiberger)	0	4	1	0	1	0	2	0	0	0	8

Sheet C	1	2	3	4	5	6	7	8	9	10	Final
China (Ma) 🔨	1	0	2	0	2	0	0	0	0	X	5
Great Britain (Smith)	0	2	0	4	0	0	1	1	1	X	9

Sheet D	1	2	3	4	5	6	7	8	9	10	Final
Czech Republic (Klima) 🔨	1	0	3	0	1	1	0	1	2	2	11
South Korea (Kim)	0	2	0	2	0	0	3	0	0	0	7

Sheet E	1	2	3	4	5	6	7	8	9	10	Final
Norway (Høiberg)	0	0	1	0	0	3	0	X	X	X	4
Canada (Bottcher) 🔨	0	3	0	3	2	0	2	X	X	X	10

==== Draw 4 ====
Saturday, December 14, 9:00

Sheet A	1	2	3	4	5	6	7	8	9	10	Final
Canada (Bottcher) 🔨	2	1	0	2	0	1	0	0	0	1	7
South Korea (Kim)	0	0	2	0	1	0	3	0	0	0	6

Sheet B	1	2	3	4	5	6	7	8	9	10	Final
Czech Republic (Klima)	0	0	0	0	0	1	1	X	X	X	2
Great Britain (Smith) 🔨	3	1	1	0	3	0	0	X	X	X	8

Sheet C	1	2	3	4	5	6	7	8	9	10	Final
Switzerland (Freiberger)	0	0	0	2	0	2	0	0	0	X	4
Norway (Høiberg) 🔨	0	0	2	0	1	0	2	1	2	X	8

Sheet D	1	2	3	4	5	6	7	8	9	10	Final
Sweden (Eriksson)	0	0	0	3	1	0	4	X	X	X	8
Italy (Pascale) 🔨	0	1	0	0	0	1	0	X	X	X	2

Sheet E	1	2	3	4	5	6	7	8	9	10	Final
China (Ma) 🔨	0	0	0	0	1	1	2	2	0	X	6
United States (Plys)	0	1	1	1	0	0	0	0	1	X	4

==== Draw 5 ====
Sunday, December 15, 9:00

Sheet A	1	2	3	4	5	6	7	8	9	10	Final
Czech Republic (Klima) 🔨	1	0	0	1	1	1	0	0	0	X	4
Norway (Høiberg)	0	3	0	0	0	0	1	4	2	X	10

Sheet B	1	2	3	4	5	6	7	8	9	10	Final
South Korea (Kim) 🔨	1	1	3	0	0	3	X	X	X	X	8
China (Ma)	0	0	0	1	0	0	X	X	X	X	1

Sheet C	1	2	3	4	5	6	7	8	9	10	Final
Italy (Pascale)	0	0	0	0	0	1	X	X	X	X	1
Canada (Bottcher) 🔨	2	1	1	3	0	0	X	X	X	X	7

Sheet D	1	2	3	4	5	6	7	8	9	10	Final
United States (Plys) 🔨	1	0	0	0	2	1	0	0	X	X	4
Switzerland (Freiberger)	0	2	1	0	0	0	3	3	X	X	9

Sheet E	1	2	3	4	5	6	7	8	9	10	Final
Great Britain (Smith)	0	0	1	0	2	0	1	0	1	0	5
Sweden (Eriksson) 🔨	0	2	0	1	0	2	0	1	0	1	7

==== Draw 6 ====
Sunday, December 15, 19:00

Sheet A	1	2	3	4	5	6	7	8	9	10	Final
South Korea (Kim)	0	1	0	0	0	0	X	X	X	X	1
Sweden (Eriksson) 🔨	2	0	1	0	3	2	X	X	X	X	8

Sheet B	1	2	3	4	5	6	7	8	9	10	Final
Norway (Høiberg)	0	0	2	2	1	0	0	3	0	X	8
Italy (Pascale) 🔨	0	1	0	0	0	1	2	0	1	X	5

Sheet C	1	2	3	4	5	6	7	8	9	10	Final
Great Britain (Smith) 🔨	1	0	0	0	0	2	0	1	X	X	4
United States (Plys)	0	0	0	2	3	0	3	0	X	X	8

Sheet D	1	2	3	4	5	6	7	8	9	10	Final
Canada (Bottcher)	0	3	0	2	0	0	0	3	0	X	8
Czech Republic (Klima) 🔨	1	0	1	0	1	1	0	0	1	X	5

Sheet E	1	2	3	4	5	6	7	8	9	10	11	Final
Switzerland (Freiberger) 🔨	1	0	1	2	0	0	2	0	1	0	1	8
China (Ma)	0	3	0	0	1	0	0	1	0	2	0	7

==== Draw 7 ====
Monday, December 16, 14:00

Sheet A	1	2	3	4	5	6	7	8	9	10	Final
United States (Plys)	2	2	0	0	6	0	X	X	X	X	10
Canada (Bottcher) 🔨	0	0	0	2	0	1	X	X	X	X	3

Sheet B	1	2	3	4	5	6	7	8	9	10	Final
Switzerland (Freiberger) 🔨	0	0	0	2	0	0	3	0	3	X	8
Czech Republic (Klima)	0	0	1	0	0	0	0	1	0	X	2

Sheet C	1	2	3	4	5	6	7	8	9	10	Final
Sweden (Eriksson) 🔨	2	0	1	0	1	0	2	0	1	X	7
China (Ma)	0	1	0	2	0	0	0	1	0	X	4

Sheet D	1	2	3	4	5	6	7	8	9	10	Final
South Korea (Kim)	0	0	0	0	2	0	1	0	0	1	4
Norway (Høiberg) 🔨	1	1	1	0	0	1	0	1	0	0	5

Sheet E	1	2	3	4	5	6	7	8	9	10	Final
Italy (Pascale)	1	0	1	0	0	1	0	1	0	X	4
Great Britain (Smith) 🔨	0	2	0	2	1	0	2	0	2	X	9

==== Draw 8 ====
Tuesday, December 17, 9:00

Sheet A	1	2	3	4	5	6	7	8	9	10	11	Final
China (Ma) 🔨	1	0	1	0	1	0	1	0	1	0	0	5
Czech Republic (Klima)	0	1	0	1	0	0	0	2	0	1	1	6

Sheet B	1	2	3	4	5	6	7	8	9	10	Final
Great Britain (Smith)	0	0	1	0	2	2	0	0	1	X	6
South Korea (Kim) 🔨	1	2	0	1	0	0	0	0	0	X	4

Sheet C	1	2	3	4	5	6	7	8	9	10	Final
Canada (Bottcher)	0	2	1	1	1	0	0	0	0	X	5
Switzerland (Freiberger) 🔨	3	0	0	0	0	1	2	2	1	X	9

Sheet D	1	2	3	4	5	6	7	8	9	10	Final
Italy (Pascale)	0	0	1	0	1	0	1	1	1	X	5
United States (Plys) 🔨	1	1	0	0	0	1	0	0	0	X	3

Sheet E	1	2	3	4	5	6	7	8	9	10	Final
Sweden (Eriksson) 🔨	3	0	2	0	2	1	X	X	X	X	8
Norway (Høiberg)	0	1	0	1	0	0	X	X	X	X	2

==== Draw 9 ====
Tuesday, December 17, 19:00

Sheet A	1	2	3	4	5	6	7	8	9	10	11	Final
Great Britain (Smith)	1	0	0	2	1	0	1	0	1	0	1	7
Switzerland (Freiberger) 🔨	0	2	0	0	0	1	0	1	0	2	0	6

Sheet B	1	2	3	4	5	6	7	8	9	10	Final
Canada (Bottcher) 🔨	2	3	1	0	4	0	X	X	X	X	10
Sweden (Eriksson)	0	0	0	2	0	1	X	X	X	X	3

Sheet C	1	2	3	4	5	6	7	8	9	10	Final
United States (Plys)	1	0	2	0	0	0	1	1	0	2	7
South Korea (Kim) 🔨	0	1	0	0	2	0	0	0	1	0	4

Sheet D	1	2	3	4	5	6	7	8	9	10	Final
Norway (Høiberg) 🔨	1	0	0	2	0	3	3	1	X	X	10
China (Ma)	0	0	2	0	2	0	0	0	X	X	4

Sheet E	1	2	3	4	5	6	7	8	9	10	11	Final
Czech Republic (Klima) 🔨	0	0	2	0	0	2	0	1	1	1	1	8
Italy (Pascale)	0	1	0	1	3	0	2	0	0	0	0	7

=== Tiebreaker ===
Wednesday, December 18, 9:00

Sheet E	1	2	3	4	5	6	7	8	9	10	Final
Norway (Høiberg)	0	0	0	1	0	1	0	1	0	1	4
United States (Plys) 🔨	0	0	1	0	0	0	0	0	2	0	3

=== Playoffs ===
Semifinals
1	Sweden	6
4	Norway	3
2	Canada	4
3	Great Britain	7

Gold Medal Game
1	Sweden	9
3	Great Britain	5
Bronze Medal Game
2	Canada	6
4	Norway	5

==== Semifinals ====
Thursday, December 19, 19:00

Sheet B	1	2	3	4	5	6	7	8	9	10	Final
Sweden (Eriksson) 🔨	1	0	0	0	0	4	0	0	1	X	6
Norway (Høiberg)	0	0	0	1	1	0	0	1	0	X	3

Sheet A	1	2	3	4	5	6	7	8	9	10	Final
Canada (Bottcher) 🔨	0	0	1	0	0	1	0	2	0	X	4
Great Britain (Smith)	1	1	0	2	1	0	1	0	1	X	7

==== Bronze Medal Game ====
Thursday, December 19, 15:00

Sheet C	1	2	3	4	5	6	7	8	9	10	11	Final
Canada (Bottcher) 🔨	0	1	0	1	0	1	0	1	1	0	1	6
Norway (Høiberg)	0	0	2	0	1	0	1	0	0	1	0	5

==== Gold Medal Game ====
Friday, December 20, 13:30

Team	1	2	3	4	5	6	7	8	9	10	Final
Sweden (Eriksson) 🔨	1	0	2	1	0	3	1	0	0	1	9
Great Britain (Smith)	0	1	0	0	1	0	0	2	1	0	5

== Women ==
=== Teams ===
Canada	China	Great Britain	Italy	Japan
Skip: Laura Crocker; Third: Sarah Wilkes; Second: Jennifer Gates; Lead: Cheryl Kreviazuk; Alternate: Breanne Meakin	Skip: Wang Xueyi; Third: Ou Yuan; Second: Zhao Qingrou; Lead: Lu Yaqian; Alternate: Chen Yina	Skip: Hannah Fleming; Third: Lauren Gray; Second: Jennifer Dodds; Lead: Alice Spence; Alternate: Abi Brown	Skip: Giada Mosaner; Third: Lucrezia Laurenti; Second: Cinzia Ricca; Lead: Silvia Mingozzi; Alternate: Manuela Serafini	Skip: Sayaka Yoshimura; Third: Rina Ida; Second: Risa Ujihara; Lead: Mao Ishigaki; Alternate: Natsuko Ishiyama
South Korea	Russia	Sweden	Switzerland	United States
Skip: Kim Ji-sun; Third: Gim Un-chi; Second: Um Min-ji; Lead: Lee Seul-bee	Skip: Anna Sidorova; Third: Margarita Fomina; Second: Alexandra Saitova; Lead: Ekaterina Galkina; Alternate: Victoria Moiseeva	Skip: Anna Hasselborg; Third: Karin Rudström; Second: Agnes Knochenhauer; Lead: Zandra Flyg	Skip: Michèle Jäggi; Third: Marisa Winkelhausen; Second: Melanie Barbezat; Lead: Nora Baumann; Alternate: Corina Mani	Skip: Cory Christensen; Third: Rebecca Funk; Second: Anna Bauman; Lead: Mackenzie Lank; Alternate: Sonja Bauman

=== Round-robin standings ===
Final round-robin standings

Key
Teams to Playoffs

Country	Skip	W	L
Russia	Anna Sidorova	9	0
Switzerland	Michèle Jäggi	7	2
South Korea	Kim Ji-sun	6	3
Great Britain	Hannah Fleming	6	3
Sweden	Anna Hasselborg	5	4
Canada	Laura Crocker	4	5
Japan	Sayaka Yoshimura	3	6
United States	Cory Christensen	3	6
China	Wang Xueyi	2	7
Italy	Giada Mosaner	0	9

=== Round-robin results ===
==== Draw 1 ====
Thursday, December 12, 9:00

Sheet A	1	2	3	4	5	6	7	8	9	10	Final
United States (Christensen)	0	0	0	0	0	0	X	X	X	X	0
Switzerland (Jäggi) 🔨	1	1	3	3	2	2	X	X	X	X	12

Sheet B	1	2	3	4	5	6	7	8	9	10	Final
China (Wang)	1	0	0	0	0	0	0	X	X	X	1
Sweden (Hasselborg) 🔨	0	2	0	4	1	2	1	X	X	X	10

Sheet C	1	2	3	4	5	6	7	8	9	10	Final
Great Britain (Fleming) 🔨	1	0	1	0	1	0	0	X	X	X	3
Russia (Sidorova)	0	1	0	2	0	3	3	X	X	X	9

Sheet D	1	2	3	4	5	6	7	8	9	10	Final
Canada (Crocker)	2	1	0	3	1	1	X	X	X	X	8
Italy (Mosaner) 🔨	0	0	1	0	0	0	X	X	X	X	1

Sheet E	1	2	3	4	5	6	7	8	9	10	Final
Japan (Yoshimura) 🔨	2	0	3	1	0	2	0	1	0	1	10
South Korea (Kim)	0	2	0	0	2	0	2	0	1	0	7

==== Draw 2 ====
Thursday, December 12, 19:00

Sheet A	1	2	3	4	5	6	7	8	9	10	Final
Sweden (Hasselborg) 🔨	3	0	2	2	2	0	X	X	X	X	9
Canada (Crocker)	0	1	0	0	0	1	X	X	X	X	2

Sheet B	1	2	3	4	5	6	7	8	9	10	Final
Switzerland (Jäggi) 🔨	2	1	1	0	1	0	5	X	X	X	10
Italy (Mosaner)	0	0	0	1	0	1	0	X	X	X	2

Sheet C	1	2	3	4	5	6	7	8	9	10	Final
Japan (Yoshimura) 🔨	2	0	0	2	0	0	3	0	0	3	10
United States (Christensen)	0	1	0	0	2	0	0	2	2	0	7

Sheet D	1	2	3	4	5	6	7	8	9	10	11	Final
South Korea (Kim) 🔨	2	0	1	0	1	0	1	0	0	2	0	7
Russia (Sidorova)	0	2	0	1	0	1	0	1	2	0	2	9

Sheet E	1	2	3	4	5	6	7	8	9	10	Final
China (Wang) 🔨	0	1	1	0	1	0	0	0	1	2	6
Great Britain (Fleming)	0	0	0	3	0	0	4	0	0	0	7

==== Draw 3 ====
Friday, December 13, 14:00

Sheet A	1	2	3	4	5	6	7	8	9	10	Final
Russia (Sidorova) 🔨	1	1	1	0	0	2	0	3	X	X	8
China (Wang)	0	0	0	1	0	0	1	0	X	X	2

Sheet B	1	2	3	4	5	6	7	8	9	10	Final
United States (Christensen)	0	1	0	0	1	0	0	0	0	X	2
South Korea (Kim) 🔨	1	0	1	0	0	0	0	2	2	X	6

Sheet C	1	2	3	4	5	6	7	8	9	10	Final
Switzerland (Jäggi)	0	2	2	1	5	0	X	X	X	X	10
Canada (Crocker) 🔨	1	0	0	0	0	1	X	X	X	X	2

Sheet D	1	2	3	4	5	6	7	8	9	10	Final
Great Britain (Fleming) 🔨	0	0	3	3	3	1	0	X	X	X	10
Japan (Yoshimura)	2	0	0	0	0	0	1	X	X	X	3

Sheet E	1	2	3	4	5	6	7	8	9	10	Final
Sweden (Hasselborg)	2	1	1	0	0	4	2	X	X	X	10
Italy (Mosaner) 🔨	0	0	0	2	1	0	0	X	X	X	3

==== Draw 4 ====
Saturday, December 14, 9:00

Sheet A	1	2	3	4	5	6	7	8	9	10	Final
Italy (Mosaner)	0	0	1	0	0	2	1	0	2	1	7
Japan (Yoshimura) 🔨	3	1	0	2	1	0	0	1	0	0	8

Sheet B	1	2	3	4	5	6	7	8	9	10	Final
Great Britain (Fleming) 🔨	2	0	0	2	1	0	1	0	1	X	7
Canada (Crocker)	0	1	1	0	0	1	0	2	0	X	5

Sheet C	1	2	3	4	5	6	7	8	9	10	Final
South Korea (Kim) 🔨	1	0	0	3	1	0	0	0	4	X	9
Sweden (Hasselborg)	0	0	0	0	0	2	2	0	0	X	4

Sheet D	1	2	3	4	5	6	7	8	9	10	Final
Russia (Sidorova) 🔨	2	1	0	0	4	2	X	X	X	X	9
United States (Christensen)	0	0	1	0	0	0	X	X	X	X	1

Sheet E	1	2	3	4	5	6	7	8	9	10	Final
Switzerland (Jäggi) 🔨	2	0	3	0	2	0	6	X	X	X	13
China (Wang)	0	1	0	2	0	1	0	X	X	X	4

==== Draw 5 ====
Saturday, December 14, 19:00

Sheet A	1	2	3	4	5	6	7	8	9	10	Final
Great Britain (Fleming) 🔨	0	0	1	1	2	2	0	X	X	X	6
Sweden (Hasselborg)	0	0	0	0	0	0	1	X	X	X	1

Sheet B	1	2	3	4	5	6	7	8	9	10	Final
Japan (Yoshimura) 🔨	1	0	1	0	1	0	0	2	0	0	5
Switzerland (Jäggi)	0	2	0	1	0	1	0	0	2	2	8

Sheet C	1	2	3	4	5	6	7	8	9	10	Final
United States (Christensen)	0	0	2	1	0	2	0	0	0	1	6
Italy (Mosaner) 🔨	1	1	0	0	1	0	0	1	1	0	5

Sheet D	1	2	3	4	5	6	7	8	9	10	Final
China (Wang) 🔨	2	0	0	1	1	0	0	0	X	X	4
South Korea (Kim)	0	1	3	0	0	0	4	4	X	X	12

Sheet E	1	2	3	4	5	6	7	8	9	10	Final
Canada (Crocker)	0	0	1	1	0	2	0	0	1	0	5
Russia (Sidorova) 🔨	0	3	0	0	2	0	2	0	0	1	8

==== Draw 6 ====
Sunday, December 15, 14:00

Sheet A	1	2	3	4	5	6	7	8	9	10	Final
Japan (Yoshimura)	0	0	2	1	0	1	0	0	X	X	4
Russia (Sidorova) 🔨	1	1	0	0	3	0	2	2	X	X	9

Sheet B	1	2	3	4	5	6	7	8	9	10	Final
Sweden (Hasselborg) 🔨	2	0	0	3	1	0	1	X	X	X	7
United States (Christensen)	0	0	1	0	0	1	0	X	X	X	2

Sheet C	1	2	3	4	5	6	7	8	9	10	Final
Canada (Crocker) 🔨	2	0	0	0	5	2	1	X	X	X	10
China (Wang)	0	1	1	0	0	0	0	X	X	X	2

Sheet D	1	2	3	4	5	6	7	8	9	10	Final
Italy (Mosaner)	0	0	1	1	0	2	0	2	0	0	6
Great Britain (Fleming) 🔨	3	2	0	0	2	0	1	0	1	2	11

Sheet E	1	2	3	4	5	6	7	8	9	10	Final
South Korea (Kim)	0	0	1	1	1	0	1	0	1	0	5
Switzerland (Jäggi) 🔨	1	1	0	0	0	3	0	1	0	1	7

==== Draw 7 ====
Monday, December 16, 9:00

Sheet A	1	2	3	4	5	6	7	8	9	10	Final
China (Wang) 🔨	3	3	2	1	1	0	0	3	X	X	13
Italy (Mosaner)	0	0	0	0	0	3	2	0	X	X	5

Sheet B	1	2	3	4	5	6	7	8	9	10	Final
South Korea (Kim) 🔨	1	1	0	2	1	0	1	1	0	X	7
Great Britain (Fleming)	0	0	2	0	0	1	0	0	1	X	4

Sheet C	1	2	3	4	5	6	7	8	9	10	Final
Russia (Sidorova)	0	1	1	0	2	0	0	0	3	X	7
Switzerland (Jäggi) 🔨	1	0	0	2	0	1	0	1	0	X	5

Sheet D	1	2	3	4	5	6	7	8	9	10	Final
Japan (Yoshimura)	0	0	0	0	1	0	2	1	0	X	4
Sweden (Hasselborg) 🔨	2	0	1	1	0	1	0	0	4	X	9

Sheet E	1	2	3	4	5	6	7	8	9	10	Final
United States (Christensen) 🔨	0	0	1	0	1	0	1	0	0	X	3
Canada (Crocker)	0	0	0	1	0	1	0	1	2	X	5

==== Draw 8 ====
Monday, December 16, 19:00

Sheet A	1	2	3	4	5	6	7	8	9	10	Final
Switzerland (Jäggi) 🔨	1	0	1	0	2	0	1	0	3	0	8
Great Britain (Fleming)	0	3	0	1	0	1	0	3	0	1	9

Sheet B	1	2	3	4	5	6	7	8	9	10	Final
Canada (Crocker) 🔨	1	0	0	3	1	0	0	1	1	X	7
Japan (Yoshimura)	0	0	1	0	0	1	0	0	0	X	2

Sheet C	1	2	3	4	5	6	7	8	9	10	Final
Italy (Mosaner) 🔨	2	0	0	0	2	0	2	0	1	X	7
South Korea (Kim)	0	2	2	1	0	3	0	1	0	X	9

Sheet D	1	2	3	4	5	6	7	8	9	10	Final
United States (Christensen) 🔨	0	2	0	0	2	0	0	1	0	3	8
China (Wang)	0	0	1	1	0	1	0	0	3	0	6

Sheet E	1	2	3	4	5	6	7	8	9	10	Final
Russia (Sidorova) 🔨	1	0	1	1	0	2	3	X	X	X	8
Sweden (Hasselborg)	0	0	0	0	1	0	0	X	X	X	1

==== Draw 9 ====
Tuesday, December 17, 14:00

Sheet A	1	2	3	4	5	6	7	8	9	10	Final
Canada (Crocker) 🔨	1	0	0	0	0	3	1	0	0	X	5
South Korea (Kim)	0	0	2	1	3	0	0	2	1	X	9

Sheet B	1	2	3	4	5	6	7	8	9	10	Final
Italy (Mosaner)	0	0	0	0	0	0	X	X	X	X	0
Russia (Sidorova) 🔨	0	0	2	2	4	2	X	X	X	X	10

Sheet C	1	2	3	4	5	6	7	8	9	10	Final
China (Wang)	0	0	0	1	0	1	0	3	3	0	8
Japan (Yoshimura) 🔨	1	0	1	0	2	0	1	0	0	1	6

Sheet D	1	2	3	4	5	6	7	8	9	10	Final
Sweden (Hasselborg)	0	2	0	1	1	0	0	0	X	X	4
Switzerland (Jäggi) 🔨	2	0	3	0	0	2	3	2	X	X	12

Sheet E	1	2	3	4	5	6	7	8	9	10	Final
Great Britain (Fleming) 🔨	0	1	0	0	1	0	0	0	0	X	2
United States (Christensen)	0	0	0	1	0	3	0	2	3	X	9

=== Playoffs ===
Semifinals
1	Russia	7
4	Great Britain	2
2	Switzerland	5
3	South Korea	9

Gold Medal Game
1	Russia	8
3	South Korea	4
Bronze Medal Game
2	Switzerland	8
4	Great Britain	6

==== Semifinals ====
Thursday, December 19, 9:00

Sheet D	1	2	3	4	5	6	7	8	9	10	Final
Russia (Sidorova) 🔨	0	0	3	0	1	1	2	0	X	X	7
Great Britain (Fleming)	0	0	0	0	0	0	0	2	X	X	2

Sheet E	1	2	3	4	5	6	7	8	9	10	Final
Switzerland (Jäggi) 🔨	0	0	0	0	1	0	1	1	2	0	5
South Korea (Kim)	0	1	1	0	0	3	0	0	0	4	9

==== Bronze Medal Game ====
Thursday, December 19, 15:00

Sheet B	1	2	3	4	5	6	7	8	9	10	Final
Switzerland (Jäggi) 🔨	0	2	0	2	0	1	0	2	0	1	8
Great Britain (Fleming)	0	0	2	0	1	0	2	0	1	0	6

==== Gold Medal Game ====
Friday, December 20, 9:00

Sheet C	1	2	3	4	5	6	7	8	9	10	Final
Russia (Sidorova) 🔨	1	1	0	0	2	0	3	1	0	X	8
South Korea (Kim)	0	0	0	2	0	1	0	0	1	X	4
