= Yu Xinna =

Chinese female curler

- Curler ♀
- Born: August 3, 1986 (age 40); Harbin, China

Team
- Curling club: Harbin CC, Harbin

Curling career
- Member Association: China
- World Championship: 4 (2005, 2011, 2015, 2016)
- World Mixed Doubles Championship: 1 (2013)
- Pacific-Asia Championship: 4 (2003, 2004, 2014, 2015)
- Other appearances: Winter Universiade: 1 (2007), World Junior Championships: 3 (2005, 2006, 2007), Pacific-Asia Junior Championships: 3 (2005, 2006, 2007)
Medal record
Curling
World Championships
Bronze medal – third place	2011 Esbjerg
Pacific-Asia Championships
Gold medal – first place	2014 Karuizawa
Silver medal – second place	2004 Chuncheon
Bronze medal – third place	2015 Almaty

Yu Xinna (born August 3, 1986, in Harbin) is a Chinese female curler.

She is a 2011 World bronze medallist and a 2014 Pacific-Asian champion.

== Teams ==
=== Women's ===
Season	Skip	Third	Second	Lead	Alternate	Coach	Events
2003–04	Song Kelu	Yu Xinna	Sun Yue	Li Xue	Lie Jinli	Li Hongchen	PACC 2003 (5th)
2004–05	Wang Bingyu	Yue Qingshuang	Sun Yue	Yu Xinna		Tan Weidong	PAJCC 2005 (gold); WJCC 2005 (9th)
2004–05	Wang Bingyu	Yue Qingshuang	Liu Yin	Zhou Yan	Yu Xinna	Tan Weidong	PACC 2004 (silver); WCC 2005 (7th)
2005–06	Wang Bingyu	Yue Qingshuang	Sun Yue	Yu Xinna		Tan Weidong	PAJCC 2006 (gold)
2005–06	Sun Yue	Yu Xinna	Chen Yinjie	Li Xue		Li Hongchen	WJCC 2006 (9th)
2006–07	Sun Yue	Li Xue	Yu Xinna	Chen Yinjie		Li Hongchen	PAJCC 2007 (gold); WJCC 2007 (8th)
2006–07	Sun Yue	Yu Xinna	Li Xue	Chen Yinjie	Lu Chunyu	Li Hongchen	WUG 2007 (6th)
2009–10	Zhang Xindi	Liu Jinli	Liu Sijia	Yu Xinna			
2010–11	Wang Bingyu	Liu Yin	Yue Qingshuang	Zhou Yan	Yu Xinna	Zhang Wei	WCC 2011 (bronze)
2014–15	Liu Sijia	Liu Jinli	Yu Xinna	Wang Rui	Mei Jie	Zhang Wei	PACC 2014 (gold)
2014–15	Liu Sijia	Jiang Yilun	Liu Jinli	Wang Rui	Yu Xinna	Zhang Wei	WCC 2015 (5th)
2015–16	Liu Sijia	Liu Jinli	Yu Xinna	Wang Rui	Mei Jie	Zhang Wei	PACC 2015 (bronze)
2015–16	Liu Sijia	Jiang Yilun	Liu Jinli	Wang Rui	Yu Xinna	Zhang Wei	WCC 2016 (5th)

=== Mixed doubles ===
Season	Male	Female	Coach	Events
2012–13	Ma Yanlong	Yu Xinna	Tan Weidong	WMDCC 2013 (13th)
