= 2014 Pacific-Asia Curling Championships =

- Host city: Karuizawa, Japan
- Arena: Karuizawa Ice Park
- Dates: November 8–15
- Men's winner: China
- Skip: Zang Jialiang
- Third: Zou Dejia
- Second: Ba Dexin
- Lead: Zou Qiang
- Alternate: Wang Jinbo
- Finalist: Japan (Yusuke Morozumi)
- Women's winner: China
- Skip: Liu Sijia
- Third: Lie Jinli
- Second: Yu Xinna
- Lead: Wang Rui
- Alternate: Mei Jie
- Coach: Zhang Wei
- Finalist: South Korea (Kim Eun-jung)

The 2014 Pacific-Asia Curling Championships were held from November 8 to 15 at the Karuizawa Ice Park in Karuizawa, Japan.

The top two finishers in the men's tournament, Japan and China, earned berths to the 2015 Ford World Men's Curling Championship in Halifax, Nova Scotia, Canada, while the top finisher in the women's tournament, China, will join hosts Japan at the 2015 World Women's Curling Championship in Sapporo, Japan.

== Men ==
=== Teams ===
The teams are listed as follows:

Australia	China	Chinese Taipei	Japan
Skip: Ian Palangio; Third: Jay Merchant; Second: Dean Hewitt; Lead: Steve Johns	Skip: Zang Jialiang; Third: Zou Dejia; Second: Ba Dexin; Lead: Zou Qiang; Alternate: Wang Jinbo	Skip: Randie Shen; Third: Nicholas Hsu; Second: Brendon Liu; Lead: Lin Ting-li; Alternate: Quinn Yu	Skip: Yusuke Morozumi; Third: Tsuyoshi Yamaguchi; Second: Tetsuro Shimizu; Lead: Kosuke Morozumi
Kazakhstan	New Zealand	South Korea	
Fourth: Aleksandr Orlov; Skip: Viktor Kim; Second: Ilya Kuznetsov; Lead: Muzdybay Kudaibergenov; Alternate: Abylay Zhuzbay	Auckland CC, Auckland Fourth: Scott Becker; Skip: Kenny Thomson; Second: Rupert Jones; Lead: Warren Dobson	Skip: Kim Soo-hyuk; Third: Kim Tae-hwan; Second: Park Jong-duk; Lead: Nam Yoon-ho; Alternate: Yoo Min-hyeon	

=== Round-robin standings ===
Key
Teams to Playoffs
Teams to Tiebreaker

Country	Skip	W	L
Japan	Yusuke Morozumi	6	0
South Korea	Kim Soo-hyuk	5	1
China	Zang Jialiang	4	2
New Zealand	Kenny Thomson	2	4
Australia	Ian Palangio	2	4
Chinese Taipei	Randie Shen	2	4
Kazakhstan	Viktor Kim	0	6

Chinese Taipei were eliminated from the tiebreaker based on the draw shot challenge results.

=== Round-robin results ===
All draw times listed in Japan Standard Time (UTC+9).

==== Draw 3 ====
Monday, November 10, 9:00

Sheet A	1	2	3	4	5	6	7	8	9	10	Final
New Zealand (Thomson) 🔨	0	0	0	0	0	0	1	1	0	X	2
Chinese Taipei (Shen)	0	1	0	1	0	1	0	0	3	X	6

Sheet B	1	2	3	4	5	6	7	8	9	10	Final
Australia (Palangio)	0	1	0	0	2	0	0	2	0	1	6
South Korea (S. Kim) 🔨	1	0	2	1	0	2	0	0	1	0	7

Sheet C	1	2	3	4	5	6	7	8	9	10	Final
Japan (Morozumi) 🔨	6	1	3	0	2	0	2	X	X	X	14
Kazakhstan (V. Kim)	0	0	0	1	0	1	0	X	X	X	2

==== Draw 4 ====
Monday, November 10, 15:00

Sheet A	1	2	3	4	5	6	7	8	9	10	Final
Japan (Morozumi) 🔨	0	0	1	0	2	1	0	1	0	X	5
South Korea (S. Kim)	0	1	0	1	0	0	1	0	0	X	3

Sheet D	1	2	3	4	5	6	7	8	9	10	Final
China (Zang) 🔨	3	0	3	0	0	2	0	0	4	X	12
New Zealand (Thomson)	0	2	0	2	0	0	0	1	0	X	5

Sheet E	1	2	3	4	5	6	7	8	9	10	11	Final
Chinese Taipei (Shen)	0	2	0	0	0	1	0	2	0	1	0	6
Australia (Palangio) 🔨	1	0	2	1	0	0	1	0	1	0	2	8

==== Draw 5 ====
Tuesday, November 11, 9:00

Sheet A	1	2	3	4	5	6	7	8	9	10	Final
China (Zang)	0	0	1	1	0	1	0	2	0	X	5
Australia (Palangio) 🔨	0	0	0	0	0	0	2	0	1	X	3

Sheet B	1	2	3	4	5	6	7	8	9	10	Final
Chinese Taipei (Shen)	0	1	1	0	1	0	0	0	1	X	4
Japan (Morozumi) 🔨	1	0	0	2	0	1	0	2	0	X	6

Sheet E	1	2	3	4	5	6	7	8	9	10	Final
Kazakhstan (V. Kim) 🔨	0	0	0	0	0	0	X	X	X	X	0
South Korea (S. Kim)	0	5	0	1	3	2	X	X	X	X	11

==== Draw 6 ====
Tuesday, November 11, 15:00

Sheet A	1	2	3	4	5	6	7	8	9	10	Final
Chinese Taipei (Shen)	1	1	2	0	1	1	2	3	X	X	11
Kazakhstan (V. Kim) 🔨	0	0	0	0	0	0	0	0	X	X	0

Sheet C	1	2	3	4	5	6	7	8	9	10	Final
Australia (Palangio)	0	0	1	0	2	0	1	0	1	X	5
New Zealand (Thomson) 🔨	0	1	0	2	0	2	0	2	0	X	7

Sheet E	1	2	3	4	5	6	7	8	9	10	Final
Japan (Morozumi)	0	1	3	0	5	0	1	X	X	X	10
China (Zang) 🔨	0	0	0	1	0	1	0	X	X	X	2

==== Draw 7 ====
Wednesday, November 12, 9:00

Sheet C	1	2	3	4	5	6	7	8	9	10	Final
China (Zang) 🔨	3	0	4	1	3	1	X	X	X	X	12
Chinese Taipei (Shen)	0	1	0	0	0	0	X	X	X	X	1

Sheet D	1	2	3	4	5	6	7	8	9	10	Final
Kazakhstan (V. Kim)	0	1	0	2	0	1	0	X	X	X	4
Australia (Palangio) 🔨	2	0	3	0	1	0	5	X	X	X	11

Sheet E	1	2	3	4	5	6	7	8	9	10	Final
South Korea (S. Kim) 🔨	2	1	1	1	0	0	4	0	X	X	9
New Zealand (Thomson)	0	0	0	0	2	1	0	1	X	X	4

==== Draw 8 ====
Wednesday, November 12, 15:00

Sheet B	1	2	3	4	5	6	7	8	9	10	Final
Kazakhstan (V. Kim)	0	0	1	0	0	0	0	1	0	X	2
China (Zang) 🔨	4	2	0	3	1	0	1	0	0	X	11

Sheet C	1	2	3	4	5	6	7	8	9	10	Final
New Zealand (Thomson)	0	0	0	1	0	0	0	1	0	X	2
Japan (Morozumi) 🔨	1	1	1	0	2	0	0	0	2	X	7

Sheet D	1	2	3	4	5	6	7	8	9	10	Final
South Korea (S. Kim)	0	1	0	0	1	0	1	0	2	1	6
Chinese Taipei (Shen) 🔨	1	0	1	1	0	1	0	1	0	0	5

==== Draw 9 ====
Thursday, November 13, 9:00

Sheet B	1	2	3	4	5	6	7	8	9	10	Final
New Zealand (Thomson) 🔨	1	0	0	2	2	2	1	0	1	X	9
Kazakhstan (V. Kim)	0	0	1	0	0	0	0	0	0	X	1

Sheet C	1	2	3	4	5	6	7	8	9	10	Final
South Korea (S. Kim) 🔨	2	0	1	4	0	0	0	1	0	1	9
China (Zang)	0	2	0	0	2	1	0	0	3	0	8

Sheet D	1	2	3	4	5	6	7	8	9	10	Final
Australia (Palangio)	0	0	0	2	0	1	0	0	X	X	3
Japan (Morozumi) 🔨	2	1	0	0	4	0	0	2	X	X	9

=== Tiebreaker ===
Thursday, November 13, 19:00

Sheet A	1	2	3	4	5	6	7	8	9	10	Final
Australia (Palangio)	0	1	1	0	0	2	0	2	0	1	7
New Zealand (Thomson) 🔨	2	0	0	0	1	0	1	0	1	0	5

=== Playoffs ===
Semifinals
1	Japan	9	6	–
4	Australia	3	4	–
2	South Korea	9	6	6
3	China	8	8	7

Gold-medal game
1	Japan	5
3	China	7
Bronze-medal game
4	Australia	4
2	South Korea	7

==== Semifinals ====
Game 2

Friday, November 14, 9:00

Sheet B	1	2	3	4	5	6	7	8	9	10	Final
Japan (Morozumi) 🔨	1	0	3	1	0	1	0	0	0	X	6
Australia (Palangio)	0	2	0	0	1	0	0	0	1	X	4

Sheet C	1	2	3	4	5	6	7	8	9	10	Final
South Korea (S. Kim) 🔨	1	0	0	2	0	0	0	0	3	0	6
China (Zang)	0	0	1	0	2	1	1	1	0	2	8

Game 3

Friday, November 14, 14:00

Sheet C	1	2	3	4	5	6	7	8	9	10	11	Final
South Korea (S. Kim)	0	1	0	2	0	1	0	0	0	2	0	6
China (Zang) 🔨	1	0	2	0	1	0	2	0	0	0	1	7

==== Bronze-medal game ====
Saturday, November 15, 14:00

Sheet D	1	2	3	4	5	6	7	8	9	10	Final
South Korea (S. Kim) 🔨	0	0	3	0	1	0	1	1	0	1	7
Australia (Palangio)	0	0	0	2	0	1	0	0	1	0	4

==== Gold-medal game ====
Saturday, November 15, 14:00

Sheet B	1	2	3	4	5	6	7	8	9	10	Final
Japan (Morozumi) 🔨	2	0	0	0	1	0	1	0	0	1	5
China (Zang)	0	0	1	1	0	1	0	2	2	0	7

== Women ==
=== Teams ===
The teams are listed as follows:

Australia	China	Japan	New Zealand	South Korea
Skip: Kim Forge; Third: Sandy Gagnon; Second: Kate Montenay; Lead: Jenny Riordan	Skip: Liu Sijia; Third: Lie Jinli; Second: Yu Xinna; Lead: Wang Rui; Alternate: Mei Jie	Skip: Ayumi Ogasawara; Third: Sayaka Yoshimura; Second: Kaho Onodera; Lead: Yumie Funayama; Alternate: Anna Ohmiya	Auckland CC, Auckland Fourth: Thivya Jeyaranjan; Skip: Chelsea Farley; Second: Tessa Farley; Lead: Eleanor Adviento; Alternate: Waverley Taylor	Skip: Kim Eun-jung; Third: Kim Kyeong-ae; Second: Kim Seon-yeong; Lead: Kim Yeong-mi; Alternate: Kim Min-jung

=== Round-robin standings ===
Final round-robin standings

Key
Teams to Playoffs
Teams to Tiebreaker

Country	Skip	W	L
South Korea	Kim Eun-jung	8	0
China	Liu Sijia	5	3
Japan	Ayumi Ogasawara	5	3
Australia	Kim Forge	1	7
New Zealand	Chelsea Farley	1	7

=== Round-robin results ===
All draw times listed in Japan Standard Time (UTC+9).

==== Draw 1 ====
Sunday, November 9, 9:00

Sheet D	1	2	3	4	5	6	7	8	9	10	Final
New Zealand (Farley) 🔨	0	0	1	0	1	0	1	0	1	X	4
South Korea (Kim)	2	1	0	3	0	1	0	2	0	X	9

Sheet E	1	2	3	4	5	6	7	8	9	10	Final
Australia (Forge) 🔨	0	1	2	0	2	1	0	0	1	X	7
Japan (Ogasawara)	2	0	0	4	0	0	2	2	0	X	10

==== Draw 2 ====
Sunday, November 9, 16:00

Sheet C	1	2	3	4	5	6	7	8	9	10	Final
South Korea (Kim) 🔨	0	2	1	0	0	2	0	0	0	1	6
Japan (Ogasawara)	0	0	0	1	1	0	1	1	0	0	4

Sheet E	1	2	3	4	5	6	7	8	9	10	Final
New Zealand (Farley) 🔨	0	0	0	0	1	0	1	0	X	X	2
China (Liu)	2	1	1	1	0	4	0	3	X	X	12

==== Draw 3 ====
Monday, November 10, 9:00

Sheet D	1	2	3	4	5	6	7	8	9	10	Final
China (Liu) 🔨	1	0	2	0	2	0	0	2	0	X	7
Japan (Ogasawara)	0	1	0	1	0	1	1	0	0	X	4

Sheet E	1	2	3	4	5	6	7	8	9	10	Final
South Korea (Kim) 🔨	2	0	2	0	2	0	3	1	0	X	10
Australia (Forge)	0	1	0	0	0	1	0	0	1	X	3

==== Draw 4 ====
Monday, November 10, 15:00

Sheet B	1	2	3	4	5	6	7	8	9	10	Final
Australia (Forge) 🔨	0	1	0	1	0	0	1	1	2	0	6
China (Liu)	0	0	4	0	1	1	0	0	0	1	7

Sheet C	1	2	3	4	5	6	7	8	9	10	Final
Japan (Ogasawara)	1	0	0	1	0	2	0	2	0	2	8
New Zealand (Farley) 🔨	0	2	0	0	1	0	1	0	2	0	6

==== Draw 5 ====
Tuesday, November 11, 9:00

Sheet C	1	2	3	4	5	6	7	8	9	10	Final
New Zealand (Farley) 🔨	0	2	0	0	1	0	0	2	3	0	8
Australia (Forge)	2	0	0	3	0	2	2	0	0	1	10

Sheet D	1	2	3	4	5	6	7	8	9	10	Final
South Korea (Kim) 🔨	1	0	0	3	1	0	1	0	1	X	7
China (Liu)	0	0	2	0	0	1	0	1	0	X	4

==== Draw 6 ====
Tuesday, November 11, 15:00

Sheet B	1	2	3	4	5	6	7	8	9	10	Final
South Korea (Kim) 🔨	3	1	0	1	0	0	4	X	X	X	9
New Zealand (Farley)	0	0	1	0	0	1	0	X	X	X	2

Sheet D	1	2	3	4	5	6	7	8	9	10	Final
Japan (Ogasawara) 🔨	6	0	2	0	1	0	X	X	X	X	9
Australia (Forge)	0	1	0	1	0	1	X	X	X	X	3

==== Draw 7 ====
Wednesday, November 12, 9:00

Sheet A	1	2	3	4	5	6	7	8	9	10	Final
China (Liu) 🔨	1	0	1	1	0	0	0	4	2	X	9
New Zealand (Farley)	0	1	0	0	3	0	1	0	0	X	5

Sheet B	1	2	3	4	5	6	7	8	9	10	Final
Japan (Ogasawara) 🔨	0	0	1	0	1	0	1	0	1	0	4
South Korea (Kim)	0	0	0	2	0	3	0	1	0	1	7

==== Draw 8 ====
Wednesday, November 12, 15:00

Sheet A	1	2	3	4	5	6	7	8	9	10	Final
Australia (Forge) 🔨	1	1	0	1	0	0	1	0	0	X	4
South Korea (Kim)	0	0	3	0	1	0	0	2	0	X	6

Sheet E	1	2	3	4	5	6	7	8	9	10	Final
Japan (Ogasawara) 🔨	1	0	0	1	1	1	0	3	0	X	7
China (Liu)	0	0	0	0	0	0	1	0	3	X	4

==== Draw 9 ====
Thursday, November 13, 9:00

Sheet A	1	2	3	4	5	6	7	8	9	10	Final
New Zealand (Farley) 🔨	0	2	0	1	0	0	0	0	1	X	4
Japan (Ogasawara)	1	0	1	0	1	3	0	1	0	X	7

Sheet E	1	2	3	4	5	6	7	8	9	10	Final
China (Liu) 🔨	1	0	0	2	0	0	2	0	4	X	9
Australia (Forge)	0	1	0	0	1	2	0	2	0	X	6

==== Draw 10 ====
Thursday, November 13, 14:00

Sheet C	1	2	3	4	5	6	7	8	9	10	11	Final
China (Liu) 🔨	0	0	1	0	0	0	0	0	0	1	0	2
South Korea (Kim)	0	0	0	0	1	0	0	1	0	0	1	3

Sheet D	1	2	3	4	5	6	7	8	9	10	Final
Australia (Forge) 🔨	0	0	1	1	0	2	0	0	1	X	5
New Zealand (Farley)	1	3	0	0	2	0	1	1	0	X	8

=== Tiebreaker ===
Thursday, November 13, 19:00

Sheet B	1	2	3	4	5	6	7	8	9	10	Final
Australia (Forge) 🔨	1	0	0	0	0	2	2	1	0	X	6
New Zealand (Farley)	0	1	3	3	2	0	0	0	2	X	11

=== Playoffs ===
Semifinals
1	South Korea	9	9	10
4	New Zealand	4	2	7
2	China	7	4	7
3	Japan	4	7	6

Gold-medal game
1	South Korea	6
2	China	7
Bronze-medal game
4	New Zealand	4
3	Japan	8

==== Semifinals ====
Game 3

Friday, November 14, 9:00

Sheet D	1	2	3	4	5	6	7	8	9	10	Final
South Korea (Kim) 🔨	2	0	2	1	0	0	3	0	2	X	10
New Zealand (Farley)	0	2	0	0	2	0	0	3	0	X	7

Sheet E	1	2	3	4	5	6	7	8	9	10	Final
China (Liu) 🔨	1	0	1	0	1	2	0	1	0	1	7
Japan (Ogasawara)	0	1	0	1	0	0	2	0	2	0	6

Game 4

Friday, November 14, 14:00

Sheet D	1	2	3	4	5	6	7	8	9	10	Final
China (Liu)	0	0	2	0	2	0	0	2	0	2	8
Japan (Ogasawara) 🔨	1	0	0	4	0	1	0	0	1	0	7

==== Bronze-medal game ====
Saturday, November 15, 9:00

Sheet B	1	2	3	4	5	6	7	8	9	10	Final
Japan (Ogasawara) 🔨	0	2	0	3	2	0	0	1	0	X	8
New Zealand (Farley)	1	0	1	0	0	0	1	0	1	X	4

==== Gold-medal game ====
Saturday, November 15, 9:00

Sheet D	1	2	3	4	5	6	7	8	9	10	11	Final
South Korea (Kim) 🔨	0	1	0	1	1	0	2	0	1	0	0	6
China (Liu)	0	0	2	0	0	2	0	1	0	1	1	7
