= Curling at the 2007 Winter Universiade =

- Host city: Pinerolo, Italy
- Arena: Pinerolo Palaghiaccio
- Dates: January 18–26
- Men's winner: United States
- Skip: John Shuster
- Third: Jeff Isaacson
- Second: Chris Plys
- Lead: Shane McKinlay
- Alternate: Kevin Johnson
- Finalist: Great Britain (John Hamilton)
- Women's winner: Canada
- Skip: Brittany Gregor
- Third: Hayley Pattison
- Second: Katrine Fisette
- Lead: Heather Hansen
- Finalist: Russia (Liudmila Privivkova)

Curling at the 2007 Winter Universiade took place from January 18 to 26 at the Pinerolo Palaghiaccio in Pinerolo, Italy.

== Men ==
=== Teams ===
Canada	China	Czech Republic	Great Britain	Italy
Skip: Steve Laycock; Third: Ryan Deis; Second: Matthew Ryback; Lead: Drew Heidt	Skip: Zou Dejia; Third: Wang Zi; Second: Zhang Zhipeng; Lead: Yang Tuo; Alternate: Chen Lu'an	Skip: Miloš Hoferka; Third: Kryštof Chaloupek; Second: Radek Cerman; Lead: Ondřej Nývlt; Alternate: Tomáš Novák	Skip: John Hamilton; Third: Andrew Craigie; Second: Iain Chalmers; Lead: Graeme Copland; Alternate: Ross Paterson	Skip: Alberto Rostagnotto; Third: Alberto Giulani; Second: Alessandro Zardini; Lead: Lorenzo Olivieri; Alternate: Simone Margheritis
Japan	South Korea	Sweden	Switzerland	United States
Skip: Yusuke Morozumi; Third: Tsuyoshi Yamaguchi; Second: Masanori Sato; Lead: Tetsuro Shimizu; Alternate: Ryo Ogihara	Skip: Kim Chang-min; Third: Kim Min-chan; Second: Park Jong-deog; Lead: Ko Seung-wan	Karlstads CK, Karlstad; Sundbybergs CK, Sundbyberg Skip: Sebastian Kraupp; Third: Daniel Tenn; Second: Fredrik Lindberg; Lead: Viktor Kjäll	Skip: Roman Ruch; Third: Manuel Ruch; Second: Peju Hartmann; Lead: Florian Zürrer; Alternate: Martin Rios	Skip: John Shuster; Third: Jeff Isaacson; Second: Chris Plys; Lead: Shane McKinlay; Alternate: Kevin Johnson

=== Round-robin standings ===
Key
Teams to Playoffs

Country	Skip	W	L
Great Britain	John Hamilton	7	2
United States	John Shuster	7	2
Canada	Steve Laycock	7	2
Sweden	Sebastian Kraupp	6	3
South Korea	Kim Chang-min	4	5
China	Zou Dejia	4	5
Japan	Yusuke Morozumi	4	5
Switzerland	Roman Ruch	4	5
Czech Republic	Milos Hoferka	2	7
Italy	Alberto Rostagnotto	0	9

=== Round-robin results ===
==== Draw 1 ====
Sheet A	1	2	3	4	5	6	7	8	9	10	Final
China (Zou)	0	0	0	0	1	0	0	0	X	X	1
Great Britain (Hamilton) 🔨	0	1	1	2	0	1	3	0	X	X	8

Sheet B	1	2	3	4	5	6	7	8	9	10	Final
Canada (Laycock)	0	1	2	0	2	0	0	2	0	1	8
Czech Republic (Hoferka) 🔨	1	0	0	1	0	0	3	0	1	0	6

Sheet C	1	2	3	4	5	6	7	8	9	10	Final
Switzerland (Ruch)	1	0	0	3	2	0	1	0	0	1	8
United States (Shuster) 🔨	0	0	1	0	0	2	0	1	1	0	5

Sheet D	1	2	3	4	5	6	7	8	9	10	Final
Japan (Morozumi) 🔨	1	0	1	0	0	1	0	0	1	X	4
Sweden (Kraupp)	0	1	0	3	0	0	0	3	0	X	7

Sheet E	1	2	3	4	5	6	7	8	9	10	Final
South Korea (Kim)	0	0	3	0	0	2	1	0	1	0	7
Italy (Rostagnotto) 🔨	1	1	0	0	1	0	0	2	0	0	5

==== Draw 2 ====
Sheet A	1	2	3	4	5	6	7	8	9	10	Final
South Korea (Kim)	1	0	0	2	0	1	0	1	1	1	7
Canada (Laycock) 🔨	0	1	1	0	1	0	5	0	0	0	8

Sheet B	1	2	3	4	5	6	7	8	9	10	Final
United States (Shuster)	0	1	1	0	3	1	1	0	0	0	7
Italy (Rostagnotto) 🔨	0	0	0	1	0	0	0	1	1	1	4

Sheet C	1	2	3	4	5	6	7	8	9	10	Final
China (Zou) 🔨	1	0	0	0	1	0	1	0	2	0	5
Japan (Morozumi)	0	1	0	0	0	3	0	1	0	2	7

Sheet D	1	2	3	4	5	6	7	8	9	10	Final
Switzerland (Ruch)	1	0	1	0	0	0	2	1	0	X	5
Great Britain (Hamilton) 🔨	0	2	0	3	1	2	0	0	1	X	7

Sheet E	1	2	3	4	5	6	7	8	9	10	Final
Czech Republic (Hoferka) 🔨	0	0	0	0	0	1	0	0	X	X	1
Sweden (Kraupp)	0	1	2	2	1	0	0	1	X	X	7

==== Draw 3 ====
Sheet A	1	2	3	4	5	6	7	8	9	10	Final
Sweden (Kraupp) 🔨	0	0	4	2	0	3	0	0	0	2	11
Italy (Rostagnotto)	0	0	0	0	1	0	1	1	1	0	4

Sheet B	1	2	3	4	5	6	7	8	9	10	Final
Great Britain (Hamilton)	0	0	0	2	3	0	2	0	2	0	9
Japan (Morozumi) 🔨	2	1	1	0	0	3	0	5	0	1	13

Sheet C	1	2	3	4	5	6	7	8	9	10	Final
Czech Republic (Hoferka)	0	0	0	1	0	0	2	2	0	0	5
South Korea (Kim) 🔨	0	0	1	0	3	0	0	0	2	1	7

Sheet D	1	2	3	4	5	6	7	8	9	10	Final
United States (Shuster) 🔨	4	0	2	0	2	0	1	0	2	X	11
China (Zou)	0	1	0	2	0	0	0	2	0	X	5

Sheet E	1	2	3	4	5	6	7	8	9	10	Final
Switzerland (Ruch) 🔨	0	1	1	0	2	1	0	0	2	2	9
Canada (Laycock)	1	0	0	1	0	0	2	1	0	0	5

==== Draw 4 ====
Sheet A	1	2	3	4	5	6	7	8	9	10	Final
Great Britain (Hamilton)	0	2	0	1	1	0	2	0	2	0	8
Czech Republic (Hoferka) 🔨	1	0	1	0	0	2	0	1	0	0	5

Sheet B	1	2	3	4	5	6	7	8	9	10	Final
Switzerland (Ruch) 🔨	1	0	0	2	0	0	1	0	0	0	4
China (Zou)	0	0	1	0	1	0	0	4	1	1	8

Sheet C	1	2	3	4	5	6	7	8	9	10	Final
Canada (Laycock)	0	2	0	1	0	1	2	0	0	1	7
Italy (Rostagnotto) 🔨	1	0	1	0	2	0	0	1	1	0	6

Sheet D	1	2	3	4	5	6	7	8	9	10	Final
Sweden (Kraupp) 🔨	2	0	1	0	0	2	1	1	0	0	7
South Korea (Kim)	0	1	0	2	1	0	0	0	1	0	5

Sheet E	1	2	3	4	5	6	7	8	9	10	Final
Japan (Morozumi) 🔨	1	0	0	0	0	0	0	2	0	X	3
United States (Shuster)	0	1	0	1	1	2	1	0	1	X	7

==== Draw 5 ====
Sheet A	1	2	3	4	5	6	7	8	9	10	Final
Switzerland (Ruch)	0	0	0	2	0	1	0	1	0	2	6
South Korea (Kim) 🔨	2	1	2	0	1	0	2	0	1	0	9

Sheet B	1	2	3	4	5	6	7	8	9	10	Final
Czech Republic (Hoferka)	0	1	0	1	0	2	0	0	X	X	4
United States (Shuster) 🔨	4	0	1	0	5	0	0	1	X	X	11

Sheet C	1	2	3	4	5	6	7	8	9	10	Final
Great Britain (Hamilton) 🔨	2	0	2	2	3	0	0	X	X	X	9
Sweden (Kraupp)	0	2	0	0	0	0	1	X	X	X	3

Sheet D	1	2	3	4	5	6	7	8	9	10	Final
Canada (Laycock) 🔨	2		0	1	0	0	0	2	1	0	7
Japan (Morozumi)	0	0	1	0	0	2	1	0	0	0	4

Sheet E	1	2	3	4	5	6	7	8	9	10	Final
Italy (Rostagnotto)	0	0	0	0	1	0	1	0	2	0	4
China (Zou) 🔨	0	1	0	1	0	2	0	1	0	2	7

==== Draw 6 ====
Sheet A	1	2	3	4	5	6	7	8	9	10	Final
Italy (Rostagnotto)	1	0	1	0	0	1	0	0	X	X	3
Japan (Morozumi) 🔨	0	1	0	5	2	0	1	1	X	X	10

Sheet B	1	2	3	4	5	6	7	8	9	10	Final
China (Zou) 🔨	1	0	1	0	0	1	0	1	1	0	5
Sweden (Kraupp)	0	3	0	2	1	0	2	0	0	1	9

Sheet C	1	2	3	4	5	6	7	8	9	10	Final
United States (Shuster) 🔨	1	0	0	1	0	0	1	1	0	1	5
Canada (Laycock)	0	1	1	0	2	0	0	0	0	0	4

Sheet D	1	2	3	4	5	6	7	8	9	10	Final
Czech Republic (Hoferka)	0	1	3	0	0	1	0	1	0	0	6
Switzerland (Ruch) 🔨	1	0	0	0	1	0	2	0	3	2	9

Sheet E	1	2	3	4	5	6	7	8	9	10	Final
Great Britain (Hamilton) 🔨	0	1	2	0	0	1	0	3	0	1	8
South Korea (Kim)	1	0	0	2	0	0	1	0	2	0	6

==== Draw 7 ====
Sheet A	1	2	3	4	5	6	7	8	9	10	Final
Canada (Laycock) 🔨	1	4	0	1	1	2	2	X	X	X	11
China (Zou)	0	0	1	0	0	0	0	X	X	X	1

Sheet B	1	2	3	4	5	6	7	8	9	10	Final
Italy (Rostagnotto) 🔨	0	0	0	1	0	0	0	1	0	X	2
Great Britain (Hamilton)	1	1	3	0	2	0	0	0	1	X	8

Sheet C	1	2	3	4	5	6	7	8	9	10	Final
Japan (Morozumi)	0	0	0	0	0	2	0	X	X	X	2
Czech Republic (Hoferka) 🔨	2	1	2	1	1	0	3	X	X	X	10

Sheet D	1	2	3	4	5	6	7	8	9	10	Final
South Korea (Kim) 🔨	0	0	1	0	1	0	0	X	X	X	2
United States (Shuster)	0	0	0	2	0	3	3	X	X	X	8

Sheet E	1	2	3	4	5	6	7	8	9	10	Final
Sweden (Kraupp) 🔨	1	0	0	1	0	0	0	2	0	1	5
Switzerland (Ruch)	0	1	0	0	0	1	0	0	1	0	3

==== Draw 8 ====
Sheet A	1	2	3	4	5	6	7	8	9	10	Final
United States (Shuster)	0	1	2	3	0	2	0	1	X	X	9
Sweden (Kraupp) 🔨	2	0	0	0	1	0	1	0	X	X	4

Sheet B	1	2	3	4	5	6	7	8	9	10	Final
Japan (Morozumi) 🔨	1	0	1	0	1	0	3	0	2	1	9
South Korea (Kim)	0	3	0	2	0	4	0	1	0	0	10

Sheet C	1	2	3	4	5	6	7	8	9	10	Final
Italy (Rostagnotto) 🔨	0	1	1	0	2	0	1	0	1	0	6
Switzerland (Ruch)	0	0	0	4	0	2	0	1	0	2	9

Sheet D	1	2	3	4	5	6	7	8	9	10	Final
Great Britain (Hamilton) 🔨	1	0	0	1	0	0	1	1	0	0	4
Canada (Laycock)	0	1	1	0	0	2	0	0	2	1	7

Sheet E	1	2	3	4	5	6	7	8	9	10	Final
China (Zou) 🔨	3	0	0	1	0	1	2	2	X	X	9
Czech Republic (Hoferka)	0	1	0	0	1	0	0	0	X	X	2

==== Draw 9 ====
Sheet A	1	2	3	4	5	6	7	8	9	10	Final
Japan (Morozumi)	0	3	0	0	1	0	0	1	0	1	6
Switzerland (Ruch) 🔨	1	0	2	0	0	1	0	0	1	0	5

Sheet B	1	2	3	4	5	6	7	8	9	10	Final
Sweden (Kraupp)	0	2	0	0	1	0	0	1	0	X	4
Canada (Laycock) 🔨	2	0	1	0	0	2	2	0	3	X	10

Sheet C	1	2	3	4	5	6	7	8	9	10	Final
South Korea (Kim) 🔨	1	1	0	1	0	2	0	1	1	0	7
China (Zou)	0	0	4	0	3	0	2	0	0	3	12

Sheet D	1	2	3	4	5	6	7	8	9	10	Final
Italy (Rostagnotto)	0	0	0	0	1	0	X	X	X	X	1
Czech Republic (Hoferka) 🔨	2	2	2	1	0	2	X	X	X	X	9

Sheet E	1	2	3	4	5	6	7	8	9	10	Final
United States (Shuster) 🔨	1	0	1	0	1	0	0	0	0	1	4
Great Britain (Hamilton)	0	1	0	1	0	1	1	1	1	0	6

=== Playoffs ===
Semifinals
1	Great Britain	8
4	Sweden	4
3	Canada	3
2	United States	7

Gold Medal Game
1	Great Britain	4
2	United States	9
Bronze Medal Game
4	Sweden	9
3	Canada	4

==== Semifinals ====
Sheet B	1	2	3	4	5	6	7	8	9	10	Final
Great Britain (Hamilton)	0	0	1	1	0	2	1	0	1	2	8
Sweden (Kraupp) 🔨	0	1	0	0	2	0	0	1	0	0	4

Sheet C	1	2	3	4	5	6	7	8	9	10	Final
Canada (Laycock)	0	0	1	0	1	0	0	1	X	X	3
United States (Shuster) 🔨	3	0	0	2	0	1	1	0	X	X	7

==== Bronze Medal Game ====
Sheet C	1	2	3	4	5	6	7	8	9	10	Final
Sweden (Kraupp) 🔨	0	1	0	1	1	2	0	2	1	1	9
Canada (Laycock)	1	0	2	0	0	0	1	0	0	0	4

==== Gold Medal Game ====
Sheet C	1	2	3	4	5	6	7	8	9	10	Final
Great Britain (Hamilton)	0	2	0	0	1	0	0	1	X	X	4
United States (Shuster) 🔨	2	0	0	2	0	4	1	0	X	X	9

== Women ==
=== Teams ===
Canada	China	Great Britain	Italy	Japan
Skip: Brittany Gregor; Third: Hayley Pattison; Second: Katrine Fisette; Lead: Heather Hansen	Skip: Sun Yue; Third: Yu Xinna; Second: Li Xue; Lead: Chen Yinjie; Alternate: Lu Chunyu	Skip: Sarah Reid; Third: Victoria Sloan; Second: Sarah MacIntyre; Lead: Laura Kirkpatrick; Alternate: Alison Black	Skip: Diana Gaspari; Third: Rosa Pompanin; Second: Elettra de Col; Lead: Deborah Pavan	Skip: Moe Meguro; Third: Mari Motohashi; Second: Mayo Yamaura; Lead: Sakurako Terada; Alternate: Asuka Yogo
Russia	South Korea	Sweden	Switzerland	United States
Skip: Liudmila Privivkova; Third: Nkeiruka Ezekh; Second: Margarita Fomina; Lead: Ekaterina Galkina; Alternate: Julia Svetova	Skip: Jeung Jin-sook; Third: Kim Ji-suk; Second: Park Mi-hee; Lead: Lee Hye-in; Alternate: Ju Yu-hwa	Skellefteå CK, Skellefteå Skip: Stina Viktorsson; Third: Maria Wennerström; Second: Hedvig Kamp; Lead: Sigrid Kamp	Skip: Niki Goridis; Third: Stéphanie Jäggi; Second: Chantal Thomet; Lead: Lea Jauch; Alternate: Karin Kramer	Skip: Jessica Schultz; Third: Christina Schwartz; Second: Megan O'Connell; Lead: Stephanie Sambor; Alternate: Lysa Hambley

=== Round-robin standings ===
Key
Teams to Playoffs
Teams to Tiebreakers

Country	Skip	W	L
Russia	Liudmila Privivkova	8	1
Sweden	Stina Viktorsson	8	1
Canada	Brittany Gregor	6	3
Japan	Moe Meguro	4	5
Italy	Diana Gaspari	4	5
China	Sun Yue	4	5
United States	Jessica Schultz	3	6
Switzerland	Niki Goridis	3	6
South Korea	Jeung Jin-sook	3	6
Great Britain	Sarah Reid	2	7

=== Round-robin results ===
==== Draw 1 ====
Sheet A	1	2	3	4	5	6	7	8	9	10	Final
Canada (Gregor) 🔨	2	0	1	1	3	0	0	0	2	X	9
South Korea (Jeung)	0	1	0	0	0	3	0	1	0	X	5

Sheet B	1	2	3	4	5	6	7	8	9	10	Final
China (Sun) 🔨	0	0	2	0	1	0	0	2	0	0	5
Russia (Privivkova)	0	0	0	2	0	1	0	0	2	3	8

Sheet C	1	2	3	4	5	6	7	8	9	10	Final
Italy (Gaspari)	0	1	0	0	0	1	0	0	0	X	2
Japan (Meguro) 🔨	1	0	2	1	0	0	1	1	1	X	7

Sheet D	1	2	3	4	5	6	7	8	9	10	Final
Great Britain (Reid)	0	0	3	0	0	1	2	0	0	1	7
Switzerland (Goridis) 🔨	0	2	0	1	1	0	0	2	3	0	9

Sheet E	1	2	3	4	5	6	7	8	9	10	Final
Sweden (Viktorsson) 🔨	1	0	1	0	2	1	0	1	0	2	8
United States (Schultz)	0	2	0	1	0	0	2	0	2	0	7

==== Draw 2 ====
Sheet A	1	2	3	4	5	6	7	8	9	10	Final
Sweden (Viktorsson) 🔨	0	0	1	0	0	0	0	1	3	3	8
China (Sun)	0	1	0	1	3	1	0	0	0	0	6

Sheet B	1	2	3	4	5	6	7	8	9	10	Final
Japan (Meguro)	0	0	3	2	0	1	0	2	0	0	8
United States (Schultz) 🔨	0	1	0	0	1	0	2	0	1	2	7

Sheet C	1	2	3	4	5	6	7	8	9	10	Final
Canada (Gregor) 🔨	0	1	0	0	2	1	0	1	0	1	6
Great Britain (Reid)	0	0	0	2	0	0	2	0	1	0	5

Sheet D	1	2	3	4	5	6	7	8	9	10	Final
Italy (Gaspari)	0	2	0	2	0	1	0	0	0	0	5
South Korea (Jeung) 🔨	1	0	1	0	3	0	2	1	0	2	10

Sheet E	1	2	3	4	5	6	7	8	9	10	Final
Russia (Privivkova) 🔨	1	0	2	0	0	2	1	0	0	3	9
Switzerland (Goridis)	0	0	0	1	1	0	0	2	1	0	5

==== Draw 3 ====
Sheet A	1	2	3	4	5	6	7	8	9	10	Final
Switzerland (Goridis) 🔨	0	2	0	0	0	0	2	1	0	0	5
United States (Schultz)	0	0	1	2	1	1	0	0	2	3	10

Sheet B	1	2	3	4	5	6	7	8	9	10	11	Final
South Korea (Jeung)	0	2	0	1	1	0	1	0	2	0	1	8
Great Britain (Reid) 🔨	1	0	1	0	0	2	0	2	0	1	0	7

Sheet C	1	2	3	4	5	6	7	8	9	10	Final
Russia (Privivkova)	0	0	1	0	3	0	4	0	0	0	8
Sweden (Viktorsson) 🔨	0	0	0	1	0	1	0	2	1	2	7

Sheet D	1	2	3	4	5	6	7	8	9	10	Final
Japan (Meguro) 🔨	1	0	1	0	2	0	2	0	0	0	6
Canada (Gregor)	0	1	0	3	0	1	0	2	1	1	9

Sheet E	1	2	3	4	5	6	7	8	9	10	Final
Italy (Gaspari) 🔨	3	0	0	1	0	3	0	2	1	X	10
China (Sun)	0	1	0	0	1	0	3	0	0	X	5

==== Draw 4 ====
Sheet A	1	2	3	4	5	6	7	8	9	10	Final
South Korea (Jeung)	0	0	0	1	0	2	2	1	0	3	9
Russia (Privivkova) 🔨	1	1	0	0	1	0	0	0	2	0	5

Sheet B	1	2	3	4	5	6	7	8	9	10	Final
Italy (Gaspari) 🔨	1	0	1	3	0	0	1	0	3	1	10
Canada (Gregor)	0	2	0	0	4	1	0	4	0	0	11

Sheet C	1	2	3	4	5	6	7	8	9	10	11	Final
China (Sun)	0	2	0	0	1	0	1	0	1	0	1	6
United States (Schultz) 🔨	1	0	1	1	0	0	0	1	0	1	0	5

Sheet D	1	2	3	4	5	6	7	8	9	10	Final
Switzerland (Goridis) 🔨	2	0	1	0	0	2	0	1	0	0	6
Sweden (Viktorsson)	0	3	0	3	1	0	2	0	1	0	10

Sheet E	1	2	3	4	5	6	7	8	9	10	Final
Great Britain (Reid) 🔨	0	1	0	0	1	1	0	0	1	2	6
Japan (Meguro)	0	0	2	0	0	0	0	1	0	0	3

==== Draw 5 ====
Sheet A	1	2	3	4	5	6	7	8	9	10	Final
Italy (Gaspari)	0	2	0	0	0	1	1	0	1	0	5
Sweden (Viktorsson) 🔨	1	0	0	2	1	0	0	1	0	1	6

Sheet B	1	2	3	4	5	6	7	8	9	10	11	Final
Russia (Privivkova)	0	0	0	0	2	0	1	2	0	0	1	6
Japan (Meguro) 🔨	0	0	1	2	0	1	0	0	0	1	0	5

Sheet C	1	2	3	4	5	6	7	8	9	10	Final
South Korea (Jeung) 🔨	1	2	0	1	0	0	3	0	1	0	8
Switzerland (Goridis)	0	0	3	0	1	1	0	2	0	2	9

Sheet D	1	2	3	4	5	6	7	8	9	10	Final
China (Sun) 🔨	0	0	0	1	0	0	0	1	1	1	4
Great Britain (Reid)	1	0	0	0	3	2	1	0	0	0	7

Sheet E	1	2	3	4	5	6	7	8	9	10	Final
United States (Schultz)	0	0	1	0	2	0	1	0	0	0	4
Canada (Gregor) 🔨	0	2	0	1	0	1	0	3	1	2	10

==== Draw 6 ====
Sheet A	1	2	3	4	5	6	7	8	9	10	Final
United States (Schultz)	0	1	3	0	0	0	2	0	1	0	7
Great Britain (Reid) 🔨	1	0	0	0	0	2	0	1	0	1	5

Sheet B	1	2	3	4	5	6	7	8	9	10	Final
Canada (Gregor) 🔨	0	1	1	0	3	0	1	1	0	0	7
Switzerland (Goridis)	0	0	0	1	0	1	0	0	2	1	5

Sheet C	1	2	3	4	5	6	7	8	9	10	Final
Japan (Meguro) 🔨	0	0	0	3	4	0	2	0	0	X	9
China (Sun)	0	0	0	0	0	1	0	2	1	X	4

Sheet D	1	2	3	4	5	6	7	8	9	10	Final
Russia (Privivkova)	0	3	1	2	2	0	X	X	X	X	8
Italy (Gaspari) 🔨	0	0	0	0	0	1	X	X	X	X	1

Sheet E	1	2	3	4	5	6	7	8	9	10	Final
South Korea (Jeung) 🔨	0	1	0	1	0	2	0	1	0	0	5
Sweden (Viktorsson)	2	0	1	0	1	0	2	0	2	1	9

==== Draw 7 ====
Sheet A	1	2	3	4	5	6	7	8	9	10	11	Final
China (Sun) 🔨	2	0	3	0	1	0	1	0	2	0	1	10
Canada (Gregor)	0	1	0	1	0	2	0	3	0	2	0	9

Sheet B	1	2	3	4	5	6	7	8	9	10	Final
United States (Schultz) 🔨	0	1	0	3	3	0	1	3	X	X	11
South Korea (Jeung)	0	0	1	0	0	1	0	0	X	X	2

Sheet C	1	2	3	4	5	6	7	8	9	10	Final
Great Britain (Reid)	0	0	0	0	0	1	0	0	X	X	1
Russia (Privivkova) 🔨	2	0	0	2	1	0	1	2	X	X	8

Sheet D	1	2	3	4	5	6	7	8	9	10	Final
Sweden (Viktorsson) 🔨	1	3	1	2	2	0	X	X	X	X	9
Japan (Meguro)	0	0	0	0	0	2	X	X	X	X	2

Sheet E	1	2	3	4	5	6	7	8	9	10	Final
Switzerland (Goridis) 🔨	0	1	0	0	2	0	0	3	0	0	6
Italy (Gaspari)	0	0	1	2	0	0	1	0	2	1	7

==== Draw 8 ====
Sheet A	1	2	3	4	5	6	7	8	9	10	Final
Japan (Meguro) 🔨	0	2	0	0	1	0	1	0	1	0	5
Switzerland (Goridis)	0	0	1	1	0	2	0	1	0	2	7

Sheet B	1	2	3	4	5	6	7	8	9	10	Final
Great Britain (Reid) 🔨	1	0	0	1	1	0	1	0	1	0	5
Sweden (Viktorsson)	0	1	2	0	0	1	0	4	0	0	8

Sheet C	1	2	3	4	5	6	7	8	9	10	Final
United States (Schultz) 🔨	0	1	0	0	0	1	0	1	0	0	3
Italy (Gaspari)	0	0	0	3	1	0	2	0	1	0	7

Sheet D	1	2	3	4	5	6	7	8	9	10	Final
South Korea (Jeung)	1	0	1	0	0	0	1	0	X	X	3
China (Sun) 🔨	0	2	0	0	0	2	0	5	X	X	9

Sheet E	1	2	3	4	5	6	7	8	9	10	Final
Canada (Gregor) 🔨	0	2	0	1	0	0	0	0	X	X	3
Russia (Privivkova)	0	0	2	0	3	3	1	2	X	X	11

==== Draw 9 ====
Sheet A	1	2	3	4	5	6	7	8	9	10	Final
Great Britain (Reid)	0	0	1	0	0	0	2	0	2	1	6
Italy (Gaspari) 🔨	1	0	0	2	1	1	0	2	0	0	7

Sheet B	1	2	3	4	5	6	7	8	9	10	Final
Switzerland (Goridis) 🔨	1	0	0	0	1	0	2	0	4	0	8
China (Sun)	0	2	1	2	0	1	0	2	0	1	9

Sheet C	1	2	3	4	5	6	7	8	9	10	Final
Sweden (Viktorsson) 🔨	1	2	2	0	0	3	0	2	X	X	10
Canada (Gregor)	0	0	0	1	1	0	2	0	X	X	4

Sheet D	1	2	3	4	5	6	7	8	9	10	Final
United States (Schultz)	0	1	0	0	0	0	1	0	X	X	2
Russia (Privivkova) 🔨	1	0	3	1	1	2	0	3	X	X	11

Sheet E	1	2	3	4	5	6	7	8	9	10	Final
Japan (Meguro)	0	0	0	3	1	2	1	0	2	X	9
South Korea (Jeung) 🔨	1	1	0	0	0	0	0	1	0	X	3

=== Tiebreakers ===
==== Round 1 ====
Sheet E	1	2	3	4	5	6	7	8	9	10	Final
China (Sun) 🔨	1	0	1	0	3	0	1	0	1	0	7
Italy (Gaspari)	0	3	0	1	0	2	0	1	0	1	8

==== Round 2 ====
Sheet C	1	2	3	4	5	6	7	8	9	10	Final
Italy (Gaspari) 🔨	1	0	3	0	1	0	0	0	1	0	6
Japan (Meguro)	0	1	0	1	0	2	1	2	0	1	8

=== Playoffs ===
Semifinals
1	Russia	9
4	Japan	8
2	Sweden	5
3	Canada	6

Gold Medal Game
1	Russia	5
3	Canada	6
Bronze Medal Game
4	Japan	7
2	Sweden	6

==== Semifinals ====
Sheet D	1	2	3	4	5	6	7	8	9	10	Final
Russia (Privivkova) 🔨	1	0	2	0	0	3	2	0	1	0	9
Japan (Meguro)	0	2	0	2	2	0	0	1	0	1	8

Sheet C	1	2	3	4	5	6	7	8	9	10	Final
Sweden (Viktorsson)	0	1	0	0	1	1	0	1	1	0	5
Canada (Gregor) 🔨	1	0	0	1	0	0	0	0	0	4	6

==== Bronze Medal Game ====
Sheet C	1	2	3	4	5	6	7	8	9	10	11	Final
Japan (Meguro)	0	1	1	1	0	2	0	1	0	0	1	7
Sweden (Viktorsson) 🔨	0	0	0	0	2	0	2	0	1	1	0	6

==== Gold Medal Game ====
Sheet C	1	2	3	4	5	6	7	8	9	10	Final
Russia (Privivkova)	1	0	2	0	0	1	0	0	1	0	5
Canada (Gregor) 🔨	0	1	0	1	0	0	2	1	0	1	6
