= Wang Jinbo =

Chinese curler

- Curler
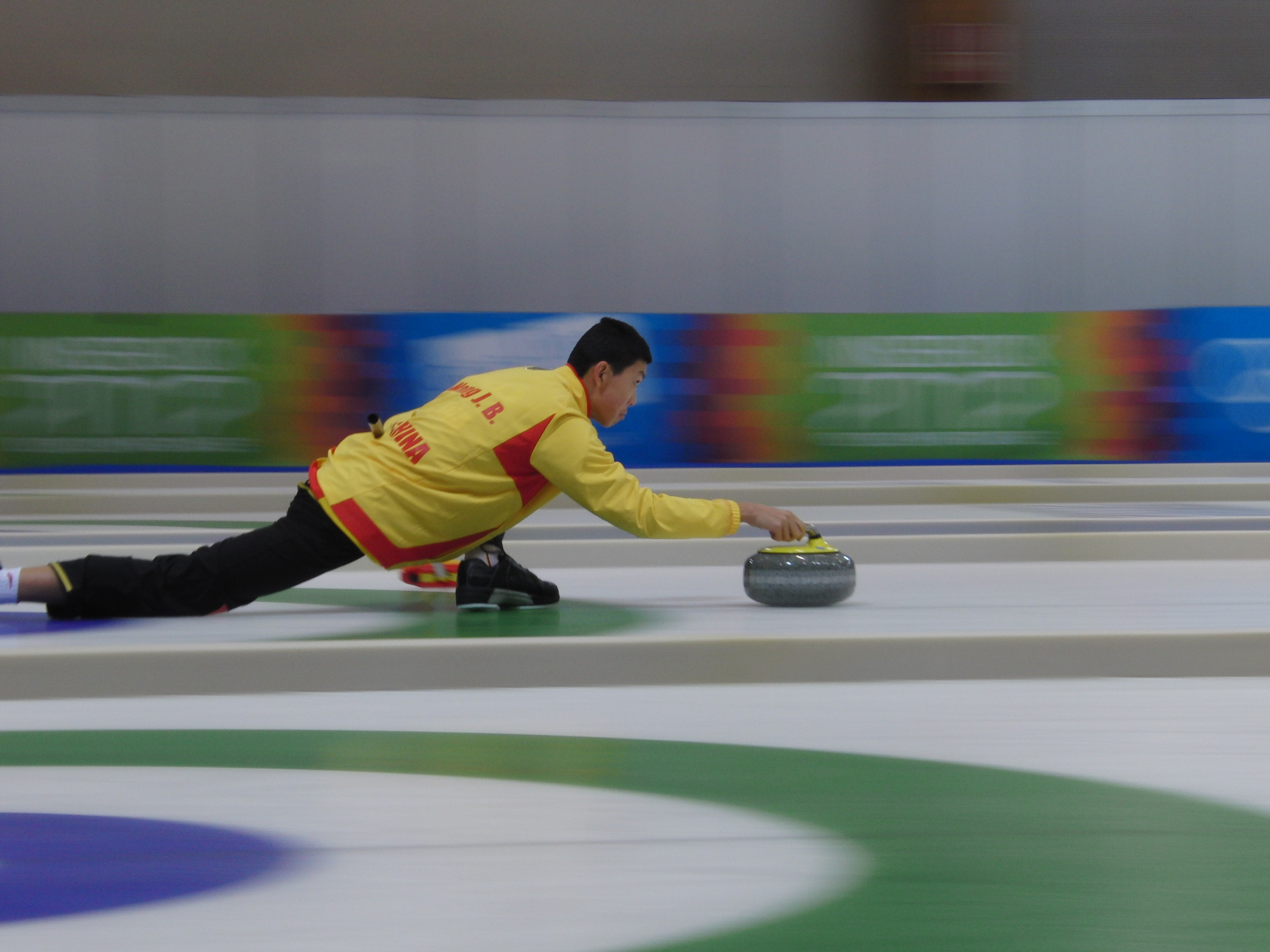
- Born: 15 May 1995 (age 31); Harbin

Team
- Skip: Liu Rui
- Third: Xu Xiaoming
- Second: Zang Jialiang
- Lead: Wang Jinbo

Curling career
- World Championship: 1 (2015)
- Pacific-Asia Championship: 2 (2014, 2015)
Medal record
Curling
Representing China
Pacific-Asia Championships
Gold medal – first place	2014 Karuizawa
Bronze medal – third place	2015 Astana

Wang Jinbo (Chinese: 王金波, born May 15, 1995) is a Chinese curler from Harbin. He competed at the 2015 Ford World Men's Curling Championship in Halifax, Nova Scotia, Canada, as lead for the Chinese team, which placed 8th in the tournament. He was member of the Chinese team that won gold medals at the 2014 Pacific-Asia Curling Championships.
