= Liu Sijia =

Chinese curler

Liu Sijia 刘斯佳
- Curler
- Born: July 20, 1988 (age 38); Harbin, China

Team
- Curling club: Harbin CC, Harbin, Heilongjiang

Curling career
- Member Association: China
- World Championship: 2 (2014, 2015)
- World Mixed Doubles Championship: 2 (2012, 2014)
- Pacific-Asia Championship: 4 (2010, 2014, 2015, 2018)
Medal record
Women's curling
Representing China
Pacific Curling Championships
Gold medal – first place	2014 Karuizawa
Silver medal – second place	2010 Uiseong
Bronze medal – third place	2015 Astana
Bronze medal – third place	2018 Gangneung
Pacific Junior Curling Championships
Gold medal – first place	2010 Nayoro
Silver medal – second place	2009 Harbin
Silver medal – second place	2008 Jeonju City

Liu Sijia (simplified Chinese: 刘斯佳; traditional Chinese: 劉斯佳; pinyin: Liú Sījiā; born July 20, 1988) is a Chinese curler from Harbin. She skipped the Chinese National Women's Curling Team at both the 2014 and 2015 World Women's Curling Championships.

== Career ==
As a junior curler Liu won a gold medal at the 2010 Pacific Junior Curling Championships and silvers at the 2008 and 2009 Pacific Juniors. She skipped the Chinese team to a seventh place finish at the 2010 World Junior Curling Championships, finishing with a 3–6 record.

In her first season out of juniors, Liu was the lead for the Chinese team, skipped by Wang Bingyu at the 2010 Pacific Curling Championships, winning a silver medal. Four years later, Liu skipped China at the 2014 World Women's Curling Championship, finishing seventh with a 6–5 record. The following year she also skipped the Chinese team at the 2015 World Women's Curling Championship, where they lost in a tiebreaker to Scotland's Eve Muirhead.

Liu won her first World Curling Tour event at the 2014 Cloverdale Cash Spiel.
