= Zhang Wei (curler) =

Chinese curler and coach

Zhang Wei 张为
- Curler ♂

Curling career
- Member Association: China
Medal record
Curling

Zhang Wei (Chinese: 张为; pinyin: Zhāng Wèi) is a Chinese male curler and curling coach.

== Record as a coach of national teams ==
Year	Tournament, event	National team	Place
2002	2002 Pacific Curling Championships	China (men)	5
2003	2003 Pacific Curling Championships	China (men)	5
2004	2004 Pacific Curling Championships	China (men)	4
2005	2005 Pacific Junior Curling Championships	China (junior men)	3rd place, bronze medalist(s)
2005	2005 Pacific Curling Championships	China (men)	4
2006	2006 Pacific Junior Curling Championships	China (junior men)	1st place, gold medalist(s)
2006	2006 World Junior Curling Championships	China (junior men)	4
2006	2006 Pacific Curling Championships	China (men)	3rd place, bronze medalist(s)
2007	2007 Pacific Junior Curling Championships	China (junior men)	1st place, gold medalist(s)
2007	2007 World Junior Curling Championships	China (junior men)	9
2007	2007 Pacific Curling Championships	China (men)	1st place, gold medalist(s)
2008	2008 Pacific Curling Championships	China (men)	1st place, gold medalist(s)
2009	2009 Winter Universiade	China (student men)	3rd place, bronze medalist(s)
2009	2009 Pacific Curling Championships	China (men)	1st place, gold medalist(s)
2010	2010 Winter Olympics	China (men)	8
2010	2010 World Men's Curling Championship	China (men)	11
2010	2010 Pacific Curling Championships	China (men)	1st place, gold medalist(s)
2011	2011 World Women's Curling Championship	China (women)	3rd place, bronze medalist(s)
2011	2011 World Mixed Doubles Curling Championship	China (mixed double)	6
2011	2011 Pacific-Asia Curling Championships	China (women)	1st place, gold medalist(s)
2012	2012 World Women's Curling Championship	China (women)	11
2014	2014 Pacific-Asia Curling Championships	China (women)	1st place, gold medalist(s)
2015	2015 World Women's Curling Championship	China (women)	5
2015	2015 Pacific-Asia Curling Championships	China (women)	3rd place, bronze medalist(s)
2018	2018 World Mixed Doubles Curling Championship	China (mixed double)	13
2019	2019 World Mixed Doubles Curling Championship	China (mixed double)	19
