= 2013 Direct Horizontal Drilling Fall Classic =

- Host city: Edmonton, Alberta
- Arena: Crestwood Curling Club
- Dates: October 11–14
- Winner: (Alberta) Kevin Martin
- Curling club: Saville SC, Edmonton
- Skip: Kevin Martin
- Third: David Nedohin
- Second: Marc Kennedy
- Lead: Ben Hebert
- Finalist: (Saskatchewan) Brock Virtue

The 2013 Direct Horizontal Drilling Fall Classic was held from October 11 to 14 at the Crestwood Curling Club in Edmonton, Alberta as part of the 2013–14 World Curling Tour. The event was held in a triple-knockout format, and the purse for the event was CAD$50,000, of which the winner, Kevin Martin, received CAD$13,000. Martin defeated Brock Virtue of Saskatchewan with a score of 6–5 in an extra end.

== Teams ==
The teams are listed as follows:

Skip	Third	Second	Lead	Locale
Ted Appelman	Shawn Donnelly	Landon Bucholz	Bryce Bucholz	Edmonton, Alberta
Tom Appelman	Nathan Connolly	Brandon Klassen	Parker Konschuh	Edmonton, Alberta
Andrew Bilesky	Stephen Kopf	Derek Errington	Aaron Watson	New Westminster, British Columbia
Brendan Bottcher	Micky Lizmore	Bradley Thiessen	Karrick Martin	Edmonton, Alberta
Rob Fowler	Allan Lyburn	Brendan Taylor	Derek Samagalski	Brandon, Manitoba
Josh Heidt	Brock Montgomery	Matt Lang	Dustin Kidby	Kerrobert, Saskatchewan
Jason Jacobson	Clint Dieno	Dane Roy	Matt Froehlich	Saskatoon, Saskatchewan
Joel Jordison	Jason Ackerman	Brent Goeres	Curtis Horwath	Regina, Saskatchewan
Kim Soo-hyuk	Kim Tae-huan	Park Jong-duk	Nam Yoon-ho	South Korea
Bruce Korte	Dean Kleiter	Roger Korte	Rob Markowsky	Saskatoon, Saskatchewan
Steve Laycock	Kirk Muyres	Colton Flasch	Dallan Muyres	Saskatoon, Saskatchewan
William Lyburn	Alex Forrest	Connor Njegovan	Tyler Forrest	Winnipeg, Manitoba
Kevin Martin	David Nedohin	Marc Kennedy	Ben Hebert	Edmonton, Alberta
Yusuke Morozumi	Tsuyoshi Yamaguchi	Tetsuro Shimizu	Kosuke Morozumi	Karuizawa, Japan
Kevin Park	Barry Chwedoruk	Eric Richard	Doug Stambaugh	Edmonton, Alberta
Shane Park	Tony Germsheid	Aaron Sarafinchan	Phil Hemming	Edmonton, Alberta
Sean Geall (fourth)	Brent Pierce (skip)	Sebastien Robillard	Mark Olson	New Westminster, British Columbia
Chris Lemishka (fourth)	Dean Ross (skip)	Tyler Pfeiffer	Neal Woloschuk	Edmonton, Alberta
Robert Schlender	Aaron Sluchinski	Justin Sluchinski	Dylan Webster	Airdrie, Alberta
Brock Virtue	Braeden Moskowy	Chris Schille	D. J. Kidby	Regina, Saskatchewan
Wang Fengchun	Jiang Dongxu	Chen Han	Wang Zhiqiang	Harbin, China
Wade White	Kevin Tym	Dan Holowaychuk	George White	Edmonton, Alberta
Matt Willerton	Jeremy Hodges	Craig MacAlpine	Chris Evernden	Edmonton, Alberta
Zou Dejia	Bai Yang	Wang Jinbo	Zhang Rongrui	Harbin, China

== Knockout results ==
The draw is listed as follows:

=== A event ===
First Knockout		Semifinals		Qualifier 1
(British Columbia) Andrew Bilesky	2
(South Korea) Kim Soo-hyuk	9	(South Korea) Kim Soo-hyuk	3
(Saskatchewan) Josh Heidt	7	(Saskatchewan) Josh Heidt	8
(Alberta) Brendan Bottcher	5			(Saskatchewan) Josh Heidt	5
(Saskatchewan) Brock Virtue	6			(Saskatchewan) Brock Virtue	7
(China) Zou Dejia	5	(Saskatchewan) Brock Virtue	6
(Alberta) Robert Schlender	2	(Manitoba) Rob Fowler	3
(Manitoba) Rob Fowler	8

First Knockout		Semifinals		Qualifier 2
(Saskatchewan) Jason Jacobson	1
(Alberta) Tom Appelman	7	(Alberta) Tom Appelman	7
(Alberta) Kevin Park	3	(Manitoba) William Lyburn	2
(Manitoba) William Lyburn	5			(Alberta) Tom Appelman	5
(Saskatchewan) Bruce Korte	6			(Saskatchewan) Steve Laycock	6
(Alberta) Shane Park	0	(Saskatchewan) Bruce Korte	2
(Saskatchewan) Joel Jordison	2	(Saskatchewan) Steve Laycock	7
(Saskatchewan) Steve Laycock	6

First Knockout		Semifinals		Qualifier 3
(British Columbia) Brent Pierce	8
(China) Wang Fengchun	4	(British Columbia) Brent Pierce	8
(Alberta) Ted Appelman	6	(Alberta) Ted Appelman	1
(Japan) Yusuke Morozumi	2			(British Columbia) Brent Pierce	2
(Alberta) Wade White	5			(Alberta) Kevin Martin	8
(Alberta) Dean Ross	6	(Alberta) Dean Ross	3
(Alberta) Matt Willerton	1	(Alberta) Kevin Martin	7
(Alberta) Kevin Martin	9

=== B event ===
Second Knockout
(British Columbia) Andrew Bilesky	4
(Alberta) Brendan Bottcher	7
(China) Zou Dejia	2
(Alberta) Robert Schlender	8

Quarterfinals
(Alberta) Dean Ross	3
(Alberta) Brendan Bottcher	6
(Alberta) Ted Appelman	8
(Alberta) Robert Schlender	5

Semifinals
(Alberta) Brendan Bottcher	4
(Alberta) Ted Appelman	5

Qualifier 4
(Alberta) Ted Appelman	2
(Alberta) Tom Appelman	4

Second Knockout
(Saskatchewan) Jason Jacobson	2
(Alberta) Kevin Park	7
(Alberta) Shane Park	2
(Saskatchewan) Joel Jordison	6

Quarterfinals
(Saskatchewan) Bruce Korte	4
(Alberta) Kevin Park	3
(Manitoba) William Lyburn	7
(Saskatchewan) Joel Jordison	2

Semifinals
(Saskatchewan) Bruce Korte	0
(Manitoba) William Lyburn	5

Qualifier 5
(Manitoba) William Lyburn	7
(British Columbia) Brent Pierce	4

Second Knockout
(China) Wang Fengchun	1
(Japan) Yusuke Morozumi	7
(Alberta) Wade White	7
(Alberta) Matt Willerton	3

Quarterfinals
(Manitoba) Rob Fowler	6
(Japan) Yusuke Morozumi	0
(South Korea) Kim Soo-hyuk	6
(Alberta) Wade White	4

Semifinals
(Manitoba) Rob Fowler	6
(South Korea) Kim Soo-hyuk	2

Qualifier 6
(Manitoba) Rob Fowler	6
(Saskatchewan) Josh Heidt	1

=== C event ===
Third Knockout
(Alberta) Wade White	5
(Alberta) Robert Schlender	6
(China) Zou Dejia	1
(Saskatchewan) Joel Jordison	7

Quarterfinals
(Alberta) Robert Schlender	2
(Alberta) Brendan Bottcher	4
(Saskatchewan) Joel Jordison	3
(Saskatchewan) Bruce Korte	6
(Alberta) Dean Ross	7
(Alberta) Kevin Park	6

Semifinals
(Alberta) Brendan Bottcher	4
(Saskatchewan) Bruce Korte	3
(Alberta) Dean Ross	2
(British Columbia) Brent Pierce	6

Qualifier 7
(Alberta) Brendan Bottcher	3
(British Columbia) Brent Pierce	4

Third Knockout
(Alberta) Shane Park	0
(Japan) Yusuke Morozumi	6
(China) Wang Fengchun	3
(Saskatchewan) Jason Jacobson	9
(British Columbia) Andrew Bilesky	7
(Alberta) Matt Willerton	6

Quarterfinals
(Japan) Yusuke Morozumi	10
(South Korea) Kim Soo-hyuk	5
(Saskatchewan) Jason Jacobson	3
(British Columbia) Andrew Bilesky	4

Semifinals
(Alberta) Ted Appelman	2
(Japan) Yusuke Morozumi	5
(Saskatchewan) Josh Heidt	6
(British Columbia) Andrew Bilesky	9

Qualifier 8
(Japan) Yusuke Morozumi	7
(British Columbia) Andrew Bilesky	6

== Playoffs ==
Quarterfinals
(Saskatchewan) Brock Virtue	6
(British Columbia) Brent Pierce	2
(Saskatchewan) Steve Laycock	9
(Japan) Yusuke Morozumi	2
(Alberta) Kevin Martin	6
(Manitoba) Rob Fowler	2
(Manitoba) William Lyburn	4
(Alberta) Tom Appelman	9

Semifinals
(Saskatchewan) Brock Virtue	5
(Saskatchewan) Steve Laycock	3
(Alberta) Kevin Martin	5
(Alberta) Tom Appelman	4

Final
(Saskatchewan) Brock Virtue	5
(Alberta) Kevin Martin	6
