= Kim Tae-hwan (curler) =

South Korean curler (born 1990)

- Curler
- Born: February 20, 1990 (age 36); Chuncheon

Team
- Curling club: Gangwon Curling, Gangwon Province

Curling career
- Member Association: South Korea
- World Championship: 3 (2011, 2016, 2023)
- Pacific-Asia Championship: 5 (2010, 2013, 2014, 2015, 2016)
- Pan Continental Championship: 1 (2022)
Medal record
Men's curling
Representing South Korea
Pan Continental Curling Championships
Silver medal – second place	2022 Calgary
Pacific-Asia Championships
Gold medal – first place	2015 Almaty
Silver medal – second place	2010 Uiseong
Bronze medal – third place	2013 Shanghai
Bronze medal – third place	2014 Karuizawa
Bronze medal – third place	2016 Uiseong
Asian Winter Games
Bronze medal – third place	2017 Sapporo
Representing Gangwon
Korean Men's Championship
Gold medal – first place	2013 Chuncheon
Gold medal – first place	2014 Chongju
Gold medal – first place	2015 Icheon
Gold medal – first place	2016 Uiseong
Silver medal – second place	2017 Icheon
Bronze medal – third place	2011 Uijeongbu
Representing Seoul
Korean Men's Championship
Gold medal – first place	2022 Jincheon
Silver medal – second place	2023 Gangneung
Bronze medal – third place	2020 Gangneung

- Kim Tae-hwan
- Hangul: 김태환
- RR: Gim Taehwan
- MR: Kim T'aehwan

Kim Tae-hwan (born February 20, 1990) is a South Korean male curler from Jeju-do.

At the international level, he is a 2015 Pacific-Asia champion.

At the national level, he is a five time Korean men's champion.

== Personal life ==
Kim is married, and has one child.

== Teams ==
Season	Skip	Third	Second	Lead	Alternate	Coach	Events
2010–11	Lee Dong-keun	Kim Soo-hyuk	Kim Tae-hwan	Nam Yoon-ho	Lee Ye-jun	Lee Doo-sung (WCC)	PACC 2010 (silver); WCC 2011 (11th)
2013–14	Kim Soo-hyuk	Kim Tae-hwan	Park Jong-duk	Nam Yoon-ho	Lee Ye-jun	Yang Se-young	PACC 2013 (bronze)
2014–15	Kim Soo-hyuk	Kim Tae-hwan	Park Jong-duk	Nam Yoon-ho	Yoo Min-hyeon	Yang Se-young	PACC 2014 (bronze)
2015–16	Kim Soo-hyuk	Kim Tae-hwan	Park Jong-duk	Nam Yoon-ho	Yoo Min-hyeon (PACC, WCC)	Yang Se-young (PACC, WCC)	PACC 2015 (gold); WCC 2016 (11th); KMCC 2016 (gold)
2016–17	Kim Soo-hyuk	Kim Tae-hwan	Park Jong-duk	Nam Yoon-ho	Yoo Min-hyeon	Yang Se-young	PACC 2016 (bronze)
2016–17	Kim Soo-hyuk	Park Jong-duk	Kim Tae-hwan	Nam Yoon-ho	Yoo Min-hyeon	Yang Se-young	AWG 2017 (bronze)
2017–18	Kim Soo-hyuk	Park Jong-duk	Kim Tae-hwan	Nam Yoon-ho			
2020–21	Kim Soo-hyuk	Lee Jeong-jae	Jeong Byeong-jin	Kim Tae-hwan			KMCC 2020 (bronze)
2021–22	Lee Jeong-jae	Jeong Byeong-jin	Kim San	Kim Tae-hwan		Yoon Hyun-joo	KMCC 2021 (4th)
2022–23	Jeong Byeong-jin	Lee Jeong-jae	Kim Min-woo	Kim Tae-hwan	Lee Dong-hyeon	Yang Jae-bong	KMCC 2022 (gold)
2023–24	Jeong Byeong-jin	Lee Jeong-jae	Kim Min-woo	Kim Tae-hwan			KMCC 2023 (silver)
