= Lee Ye-jun =

South Korean curler

- Curler
- Born: July 22, 1991 (age 35)

Team
- Curling club: Gangwon Curling, Gangwon Province

Curling career
- Member Association: South Korea
- World Championship: 1 (2011)
- Pacific-Asia Championship: 2 (2010, 2013)
Medal record
Men's curling
Representing South Korea
Pacific-Asia Championships
Silver medal – second place	2010 Uiseong
Bronze medal – third place	2013 Shanghai
Representing Gangwon
Korean Men's Championship
Gold medal – first place	2013 Chuncheon
Bronze medal – third place	2011 Uijeongbu
Korean Mixed Doubles Championship
Silver medal – second place	2017 Icheon

Lee Ye-jun (born July 22, 1991) is a South Korean male curler.

At the international level, he is a 2010 Pacific-Asia silver medallist and a 2013 Pacific-Asia bronze medallist.

== Teams ==
Season	Skip	Third	Second	Lead	Alternate	Coach	Events
2010–11	Lee Dong-keun	Kim Soo-hyuk	Kim Tae-hwan	Nam Yoon-ho	Lee Ye-jun	Lee Doo Sung (WCC)	PACC 2010 (silver); WCC 2011 (11th)
2013–14	Kim Soo-hyuk	Kim Tae-hwan	Park Jong-duk	Nam Yoon-ho	Lee Ye-jun	Yang Se Young	PACC 2013 (bronze)
