= Scott Andrews (curler) =

Scottish curler (born 1989)

- Curler
- Born: 14 June 1989 (age 37); Prestwick, South Ayrshire, Scotland

Curling career
- Member Association: Scotland; Great Britain
- World Championship: 5 (2011, 2012, 2013, 2016, 2017)
- World Mixed Doubles Championship: 1 (2019)
- European Championship: 2 (2012, 2013)
- Olympic: 1 (2014)
Medal record
Curling
Representing Great Britain
Olympic Games
Silver medal – second place	2014 Sochi
Representing Scotland
World Curling Championships
Silver medal – second place	2011 Regina
Silver medal – second place	2012 Basel
Bronze medal – third place	2013 Victoria
World Junior Curling Championships
Silver medal – second place	2010 Flims
European Curling Championships
Bronze medal – third place	2013 Stavanger
Scottish Mixed Doubles Championship
Silver medal – second place	2020 Perth

Scott Andrews (born 14 June 1989 in Prestwick) is a Scottish curler from Symington. He is the silver medalist at 2014 Winter Olympics.

== Curling career ==
Andrews had a fairly successful junior career. At the 2008 World Junior Curling Championships, playing second for Glen Muirhead, Scotland finished in 9th place, forcing the team to play in a challenge event to qualify Scotland for the 2009 World Juniors. While the Muirhead rink won the event, they as a team did not qualify out of Scotland to represent the country. Andrews did make it back to the Juniors in 2010, however, playing second for Ally Fraser. They won a silver medal, losing to Switzerland's Peter de Cruz in the final.

After Juniors, Andrews joined up with Brewster's Aberdeen rink. The team won its first Scottish championship in 2011, qualifying them for the 2011 Ford World Men's Curling Championship. The rink lost to Canada in the final and won the silver medal.

Andrews went on to claim his second Scottish title at the Cooperative Funeral Care Scottish Men's Championship in 2012, taking Brewster to the 2012 World Men's Curling Championship where they lost to Canada in the final and claimed their second silver medal.

David Murdoch joined the rink in 2012. The team finished in 7th place at the 2012 European Curling Championships. Murdoch would then take over from Brewster as skip, and skipped the team to Andrews' third win at the Scottish Championships in 2013. The 2013 World Men's Curling Championship took place in Victoria, British Columbia and the rink claimed the bronze medal after beating Denmark. Later that year, the team took bronze at the 2013 European Championships

February 2014 saw Andrews make his Team GB Winter Olympic debut at the 2014 Winter Olympics alongside David Murdoch, Michael Goodfellow, Tom Brewster and Greg Drummond. The team went on to win the silver medal at the Olympics.

After their Olympic run, Brewster would leave the team. Andrews was invited to be Brewster's alternate at the 2016 World Men's Curling Championship, but Andrews wouldn't play in any games. Team Murdoch won the 2017 Scottish championship and represented the country at the 2017 World Men's Curling Championship, finishing 6th.

Andrews played in his first World Mixed Doubles Curling Championship in 2019 with partner Gina Aitken. The pair would finish 9th.

== Personal life ==
Andrews is married.
