= Park Jong-duk =

South Korean curler (born 1985)

- Curler
- Born: December 8, 1985 (age 40)

Team
- Curling club: Gangwon Curling, Gangwon Province
- Skip: Park Jong-duk
- Third: Jeong Yeong-seok
- Second: Oh Seung-hoon
- Lead: Lee Ki-bok
- Alternate: Seong Ji-hoon

Curling career
- Member Association: South Korea
- World Championship: 2 (2016, 2024)
- Pacific-Asia Championship: 5 (2008, 2013, 2014, 2015, 2016)
- Pan Continental Championship: 1 (2023)
Medal record
Men's curling
Representing South Korea
Pan Continental Championships
Silver medal – second place	2023 Kelowna
Pacific-Asia Championships
Gold medal – first place	2015 Almaty
Silver medal – second place	2010 Uiseong
Bronze medal – third place	2013 Shanghai
Bronze medal – third place	2014 Karuizawa
Bronze medal – third place	2016 Uiseong
Asian Winter Games
Bronze medal – third place	2017 Sapporo
Pacific-Asia Junior Championships
Gold medal – first place	2005 Tokoro
Silver medal – second place	2007 Naseby
Representing Gangwon
Korean Men's Championship
Gold medal – first place	2013 Chuncheon
Gold medal – first place	2014 Chongju
Gold medal – first place	2015 Icheon
Gold medal – first place	2016 Uiseong
Gold medal – first place	2023 Gangneung
Silver medal – second place	2017 Icheon
Silver medal – second place	2018 Jincheon
Silver medal – second place	2021 Gangneung
Silver medal – second place	2024 Uijeongbu
Bronze medal – third place	2022 Jincheon
Bronze medal – third place	2026 Uiseong

Park Jong-duk (born December 8, 1985) is a South Korean male curler.

At the international level, he is a 2015 Pacific-Asia champion.

At the national level, he is a five-time Korean men's champion.

== Teams ==
Season	Skip	Third	Second	Lead	Alternate	Coach	Events
2003–04	Kim Soo-hyuk	Kim Chang-min	Park Jong-duk	Kim Hyun Chul	Seo Suk Jae	Melissa Soligo, Kim Kyung Seog	WJCC 2004 (4th)
2004–05	Kim Soo-hyuk	Kim Chang-min	Park Jong-duk	Park Jin-oh	Ha Jin-hyuk	Kim Kyung Seog	PJCC 2005 (gold); WJCC 2005 (8th)
2005–06	Kim Chang-min	Kim Min-chan	Park Jong-duk	Park Jin-oh	Choi Byung-rok	Kim Kyung Seog	WJCC 2006 (5th)
2006–07	Kim Chang-min	Kim Min-chan	Park Jong-duk	Park Jin-oh		Kim Kyung Seog	PJCC 2007 (silver)
2008–09	Lee Dong-keun	Kim Soo-hyuk	Park Jong-duk	Nam Yoon-ho	Lee Kyn-heon	Sin Young-Kook, Lee Jong-Sun	PACC 2008 (4th)
2013–14	Kim Soo-hyuk	Kim Tae-hwan	Park Jong-duk	Nam Yoon-ho	Lee Ye-jun	Yang Se Young	PACC 2013 (bronze)
2014–15	Kim Soo-hyuk	Kim Tae-hwan	Park Jong-duk	Nam Yoon-ho	Yoo Min-hyeon	Yang Se Young	PACC 2014 (bronze)
2015–16	Kim Soo-hyuk	Kim Tae-hwan	Park Jong-duk	Nam Yoon-ho	Yoo Min-hyeon (PACC, WCC)	Yang Se Young (PACC, WCC)	PACC 2015 (gold); WCC 2016 (11th); KMCC 2016 (gold)
2016–17	Kim Soo-hyuk	Kim Tae-hwan	Park Jong-duk	Nam Yoon-ho	Yoo Min-hyeon	Yang Se Young	PACC 2016 (bronze)
2016–17	Kim Soo-hyuk	Park Jong-duk	Kim Tae-hwan	Nam Yoon-ho	Yoo Min-hyeon	Yang Se Young	AWG 2017 (bronze)
2017–18	Kim Soo-hyuk	Park Jong-duk	Kim Tae-hwan	Nam Yoon-ho			
2018–19	Park Jong-duk	Nam Yoon-ho	Yoo Min-hyeon	Kim Jeong-min			
2019–20	Park Jong-duk	Nam Yoon-ho	Yoo Min-hyeon	Kim Jeong-min			
2020–21	Park Jong-duk	Seo Min-guk	Kim Jeong-min	Oh Seung-hoon			KMCC 2020 (5th)
2021–22	Lee Ki-jeong	Park Jong-duk	Lee Ki-bok	Oh Seung-hoon	Seong Yu-jin	Lee Ye-jun	KMCC 2021 (silver)
2022–23	Jeong Yeong-seok	Park Jong-duk	Oh Seung-hoon	Seong Ji-hoon			KMCC 2022 (bronze)
2023–24	Park Jong-duk	Jeong Yeong-seok	Oh Seung-hoon	Seong Ji-hoon	Lee Ki-bok	Lee Ye-jun	KMCC 2023 (gold); PCCC 2023 (silver); WCC 2024 (12th)
2024–25	Park Jong-duk	Jeong Yeong-seok	Oh Seung-hoon	Lee Ki-bok	Seong Ji-hoon	Lee Ye-jun	KMCC 2024 (silver)
2025–26	Park Jong-duk	Jeong Yeong-seok	Oh Seung-hoon	Lee Ki-bok	Seong Ji-hoon	Lee Ye-jun	KMCC 2025 (6th)
