= 2015 Pacific-Asia Curling Championships =

- Host city: Almaty, Kazakhstan
- Arena: Baluan Sholak Sports Palace
- Dates: November 7–14
- Men's winner: South Korea
- Skip: Kim Soo-hyuk
- Third: Kim Tae-hwan
- Second: Park Jong-duk
- Lead: Nam Yoon-ho
- Alternate: Yoo Min-hyeon
- Finalist: Japan (Yusuke Morozumi)
- Women's winner: Japan
- Skip: Satsuki Fujisawa
- Third: Chinami Yoshida
- Second: Yumi Suzuki
- Lead: Yurika Yoshida
- Finalist: South Korea (Kim Ji-sun)

The 2015 Pacific-Asia Curling Championships were held from November 7 to 14 at the Baluan Sholak Sports Palace in Almaty, Kazakhstan. The top two teams from the men's and women's tournaments qualified for the 2016 World Men's Curling Championship and the 2016 Ford World Women's Curling Championship, respectively.

== Men ==
=== Teams ===
Australia	China	Chinese Taipei	Hong Kong
Skip: Ian Palangio; Third: Jay Merchant; Second: Dean Hewitt; Lead: Derek Smith	Skip: Zang Jialiang; Third: Xu Xiaoming; Second: Ba Dexin; Lead: Wang Jinbo; Alternate: Ma Xiuyue	Skip: Randolph Shen; Third: Nicholas Hsu; Second: Brendon Liu; Lead: Lin Ting-li	Skip: John Li; Third: Ko Yuk-hang; Second: Justin Wan; Lead: Chan Chun-kuen; Alternate: Law Cho-kam
Japan	Kazakhstan	New Zealand	South Korea
Skip: Yusuke Morozumi; Third: Tsuyoshi Yamaguchi; Second: Tetsuro Shimizu; Lead: Kosuke Morozumi; Alternate: Kohsuke Hirata	Skip: Viktor Kim; Third: Abylaikhan Zhuzbay; Second: Daniel Kim; Lead: Muzdybay Kudaibergenov; Alternate: Abilay Nurumbetov	Skip: Peter de Boer; Third: Sean Becker; Second: Scott Becker; Lead: Brett Sargon	Skip: Kim Soo-hyuk; Third: Kim Tae-hwan; Second: Park Jong-duk; Lead: Nam Yoon-ho; Alternate: Yoo Min-hyeon

=== Round-robin standings ===
Final Round Robin Standings

Key
Teams to Playoffs
Teams to Tiebreaker

Country	Skip	W	L
Japan	Yusuke Morozumi	6	1
China	Zang Jialiang	6	1
South Korea	Kim Soo-hyuk	6	1
Australia	Ian Palangio	3	4
New Zealand	Peter de Boer	3	4
Chinese Taipei	Randolph Shen	3	4
Kazakhstan	Viktor Kim	1	6
Hong Kong	John Li	0	7

=== Round-robin results ===
All draw times are listed in Asia/Almaty Time (UTC+06).

==== Draw 3 ====
Monday, November 9, 14:30

Sheet A	1	2	3	4	5	6	7	8	9	10	Final
Chinese Taipei (Shen)	3	2	4	0	4	0	4	3	X	X	20
Hong Kong (Li)	0	0	0	1	0	1	0	0	X	X	2

Sheet C	1	2	3	4	5	6	7	8	9	10	Final
Japan (Morozumi)	1	0	0	2	0	0	3	0	0	X	6
China (Zang)	0	0	2	0	0	2	0	2	2	X	8

Sheet E	1	2	3	4	5	6	7	8	9	10	Final
South Korea (S. Kim)	1	0	2	2	0	1	0	0	1	X	7
Australia (Palangio)	0	2	0	0	1	0	1	0	0	X	4

Sheet F	1	2	3	4	5	6	7	8	9	10	Final
Kazakhstan (V. Kim)	0	1	0	1	0	0	0	X	X	X	2
New Zealand (de Boer)	2	0	1	0	2	3	2	X	X	X	10

==== Draw 4 ====
Tuesday, November 10, 9:00

Sheet A	1	2	3	4	5	6	7	8	9	10	Final
Japan (Morozumi)	2	0	0	0	1	0	1	0	2	1	7
Chinese Taipei (Shen)	0	2	0	1	0	1	0	2	0	0	6

Sheet C	1	2	3	4	5	6	7	8	9	10	11	Final
Australia (Palangio)	1	0	0	0	2	0	1	0	1	0	1	6
New Zealand (de Boer)	0	0	1	0	0	1	0	2	0	1	0	5

Sheet E	1	2	3	4	5	6	7	8	9	10	Final
China (Zang)	6	5	3	3	3	2	3	X	X	X	25
Hong Kong (Li)	0	0	0	0	0	0	0	X	X	X	0

Sheet F	1	2	3	4	5	6	7	8	9	10	Final
South Korea (S. Kim)	1	2	1	2	0	2	0	4	X	X	12
Kazakhstan (V. Kim)	0	0	0	0	1	0	1	0	X	X	2

==== Draw 5 ====
Tuesday, November 10, 14:30

Sheet A	1	2	3	4	5	6	7	8	9	10	Final
China (Zang)	2	0	0	0	2	0	0	1	0	1	6
Australia (Palangio)	0	0	1	0	0	0	2	0	2	0	5

Sheet B	1	2	3	4	5	6	7	8	9	10	Final
Kazakhstan (V. Kim)	0	1	0	0	1	0	0	1	0	X	3
Chinese Taipei (Shen)	3	0	1	2	0	2	1	0	1	X	10

Sheet D	1	2	3	4	5	6	7	8	9	10	Final
New Zealand (de Boer)	1	0	1	0	0	1	1	0	1	0	5
Japan (Morozumi)	0	2	0	1	1	0	0	0	0	2	6

Sheet F	1	2	3	4	5	6	7	8	9	10	Final
Hong Kong (Li)	0	0	0	1	0	0	0	0	X	X	1
South Korea (S. Kim)	6	3	3	0	1	3	3	1	X	X	20

==== Draw 6 ====
Wednesday, November 11, 9:00

Sheet A	1	2	3	4	5	6	7	8	9	10	Final
Kazakhstan (V. Kim)	0	0	1	0	0	0	2	0	X	X	3
Japan (Morozumi)	4	2	0	4	2	2	0	1	X	X	15

Sheet C	1	2	3	4	5	6	7	8	9	10	Final
Hong Kong (Li)	0	0	1	0	1	0	1	X	X	X	3
Australia (Palangio)	8	4	0	2	0	2	0	X	X	X	16

Sheet D	1	2	3	4	5	6	7	8	9	10	Final
Chinese Taipei (Shen)	2	0	2	0	1	0	0	0	1	0	6
South Korea (S. Kim)	0	2	0	3	0	0	0	2	0	2	9

Sheet F	1	2	3	4	5	6	7	8	9	10	Final
New Zealand (de Boer)	0	0	0	0	0	1	0	0	X	X	1
China (Zang)	0	2	2	0	0	0	2	2	X	X	8

==== Draw 7 ====
Wednesday, November 11, 14:30

Sheet A	1	2	3	4	5	6	7	8	9	10	Final
South Korea (S. Kim)	3	0	1	0	0	1	0	2	0	1	8
China (Zang)	0	1	0	1	0	0	2	0	2	0	6

Sheet B	1	2	3	4	5	6	7	8	9	10	Final
Chinese Taipei (Shen)	0	1	0	0	0	1	0	2	1	0	5
New Zealand (de Boer)	2	0	3	0	0	0	1	0	0	1	7

Sheet D	1	2	3	4	5	6	7	8	9	10	Final
Hong Kong (Li)	0	0	0	0	0	1	0	1	0	X	2
Kazakhstan (V. Kim)	3	2	2	2	2	0	2	0	3	X	16

Sheet F	1	2	3	4	5	6	7	8	9	10	Final
Australia (Palangio)	0	0	1	0	1	0	0	1	0	X	3
Japan (Morozumi)	1	1	0	2	0	1	2	0	2	X	9

==== Draw 8 ====
Thursday, November 12, 9:00

Sheet A	1	2	3	4	5	6	7	8	9	10	Final
Australia (Palangio)	0	1	0	3	2	1	1	1	X	X	9
Kazakhstan (V. Kim)	0	0	2	0	0	0	0	0	X	X	2

Sheet B	1	2	3	4	5	6	7	8	9	10	Final
New Zealand (de Boer)	0	0	3	0	0	1	1	0	0	0	5
South Korea (S. Kim)	1	1	0	2	1	0	0	1	1	1	8

Sheet D	1	2	3	4	5	6	7	8	9	10	Final
China (Zang)	2	1	0	0	0	1	1	2	X	X	7
Chinese Taipei (Shen)	0	0	1	1	0	0	0	0	X	X	2

Sheet F	1	2	3	4	5	6	7	8	9	10	Final
Japan (Morozumi)	1	3	0	5	2	4	0	4	X	X	19
Hong Kong (Li)	0	0	1	0	0	0	1	0	X	X	2

==== Draw 9 ====
Thursday, November 12, 14:30

Sheet A	1	2	3	4	5	6	7	8	9	10	Final
Hong Kong (Li)	1	0	0	1	0	0	0	X	X	X	2
New Zealand (de Boer)	0	3	5	0	6	4	2	X	X	X	20

Sheet C	1	2	3	4	5	6	7	8	9	10	11	Final
South Korea (S. Kim)	0	2	0	1	0	1	1	2	0	0	0	7
Japan (Morozumi)	1	0	1	0	3	0	0	0	1	1	1	8

Sheet E	1	2	3	4	5	6	7	8	9	10	Final
Kazakhstan (V. Kim)	1	0	0	0	0	1	1	0	X	X	3
China (Zang)	0	3	2	4	2	0	0	2	X	X	13

Sheet F	1	2	3	4	5	6	7	8	9	10	Final
Chinese Taipei (Shen)	0	1	0	3	0	2	0	0	3	X	9
Australia (Palangio)	0	0	1	0	2	0	1	1	0	X	5

=== Tiebreaker ===
Friday, November 13, 14:30

Sheet C	1	2	3	4	5	6	7	8	9	10	Final
Australia (Palangio)	0	1	0	1	0	1	0	1	0	X	4
New Zealand (de Boer)	0	0	3	0	2	0	1	0	3	X	9

=== Playoffs ===
Semifinals
1	Japan	7
4	New Zealand	6
2	China	6
3	South Korea	8

Final
1	Japan	7
3	South Korea	11

Bronze-medal game
4	New Zealand	4
2	China	5

==== Semifinals ====
Friday, November 13, 19:00

Sheet F	1	2	3	4	5	6	7	8	9	10	Final
Japan (Morozumi)	2	0	3	0	0	0	1	0	0	1	7
New Zealand (de Boer)	0	2	0	2	0	0	0	2	0	0	6

Sheet D	1	2	3	4	5	6	7	8	9	10	Final
China (Zang)	0	0	2	1	0	1	0	0	2	0	6
South Korea (Kim)	1	0	0	0	4	0	0	1	0	2	8

==== Bronze-medal game ====
Saturday, November 14, 9:00

Sheet E	1	2	3	4	5	6	7	8	9	10	Final
New Zealand (de Boer)	0	0	0	0	0	1	1	0	2	0	4
China (Zang)	0	0	1	1	2	0	0	1	0	0	5

==== Gold-medal game ====
Saturday, November 14, 9:00

Sheet B	1	2	3	4	5	6	7	8	9	10	Final
Japan (Morozumi)	0	0	0	1	0	3	0	3	0	X	7
South Korea (Kim)	1	1	2	0	4	0	2	0	1	X	11

== Women ==
=== Teams ===
China	Japan	Kazakhstan	New Zealand	South Korea
Skip: Liu Sijia; Third: Liu Jinli; Second: Yu Xinna; Lead: Wang Rui; Alternate: Mei Jie	Skip: Satsuki Fujisawa; Third: Chinami Yoshida; Second: Yumi Suzuki; Lead: Yurika Yoshida; Alternate: Kotomi Ishizaki	Skip: Olga Ten; Third: Olga Panina; Second: Nargiz Issayeva; Lead: Regina Lankina; Alternate: Anastassya Spirikova	Skip: Chelsea Farley; Third: Thivya Jeyaranjan; Second: Tessa Farley; Lead: Eleanor Adviento; Alternate: Emily Whelan	Fourth: Gim Un-chi; Third: Lee Seul-bee; Second: Um Min-ji; Skip: Kim Ji-sun; Alternate: Yeom Yoon-jung

=== Round-robin standings ===
Final Round Robin Standings

Key
Teams to Playoffs
Teams to Tiebreaker

Country	Skip	W	L
Japan	Satsuki Fujisawa	6	2
South Korea	Kim Ji-sun	6	2
China	Liu Sijia	6	2
Kazakhstan	Olga Ten	1	7
New Zealand	Chelsea Farley	1	7

=== Round-robin results ===
All draw times are listed in Asia/Almaty Time (UTC+06).

==== Draw 1 ====
Sunday, November 8, 16:30

Sheet C	1	2	3	4	5	6	7	8	9	10	Final
China (Liu)	0	0	0	0	0	1	0	2	0	X	3
Japan (Fujisawa)	1	0	2	3	1	0	1	0	2	X	10

Sheet D	1	2	3	4	5	6	7	8	9	10	Final
Kazakhstan (Ten)	0	0	0	0	0	0	0	0	X	X	0
South Korea (Kim)	4	5	1	1	2	1	3	3	X	X	20

==== Draw 2 ====
Monday, November 9, 9:00

Sheet C	1	2	3	4	5	6	7	8	9	10	Final
South Korea (Kim)	1	0	4	0	0	2	3	X	X	X	10
New Zealand (Farley)	0	1	0	1	1	0	0	X	X	X	3

Sheet E	1	2	3	4	5	6	7	8	9	10	Final
China (Liu)	0	1	1	1	2	0	4	2	X	X	11
Kazakhstan (Ten)	0	0	0	0	0	0	0	0	X	X	0

==== Draw 3 ====
Monday, November 9, 14:30

Sheet B	1	2	3	4	5	6	7	8	9	10	Final
New Zealand (Farley)	0	0	1	0	0	1	0	0	X	X	2
China (Liu)	0	1	0	2	3	0	2	1	X	X	9

Sheet D	1	2	3	4	5	6	7	8	9	10	Final
Japan (Fujisawa)	0	3	1	0	4	0	3	X	X	X	11
Kazakhstan (Ten)	1	0	0	1	0	1	0	X	X	X	3

==== Draw 4 ====
Tuesday, November 10, 9:00

Sheet B	1	2	3	4	5	6	7	8	9	10	Final
Japan (Fujisawa)	0	2	0	4	0	2	0	1	X	X	9
New Zealand (Farley)	1	0	1	0	1	0	0	0	X	X	3

Sheet D	1	2	3	4	5	6	7	8	9	10	Final
South Korea (Kim)	0	0	0	0	2	0	0	1	1	0	4
China (Liu)	0	2	1	1	0	0	1	0	0	1	6

==== Draw 5 ====
Tuesday, November 10, 14:30

Sheet C	1	2	3	4	5	6	7	8	9	10	Final
New Zealand (Farley)	3	0	0	1	0	2	0	1	0	2	9
Kazakhstan (Ten)	0	1	1	0	3	0	4	0	1	0	10

Sheet E	1	2	3	4	5	6	7	8	9	10	Final
South Korea (Kim)	1	0	1	1	0	0	1	3	X	X	7
Japan (Fujisawa)	0	1	0	0	1	0	0	0	X	X	2

==== Draw 6 ====
Wednesday, November 11, 9:00

Sheet B	1	2	3	4	5	6	7	8	9	10	Final
South Korea (Kim)	0	5	0	4	0	5	X	X	X	X	14
Kazakhstan (Ten)	1	0	1	0	1	0	X	X	X	X	3

Sheet E	1	2	3	4	5	6	7	8	9	10	Final
Japan (Fujisawa)	0	0	1	0	0	1	1	0	0	2	5
China (Liu)	0	0	0	2	0	0	0	2	0	0	4

==== Draw 7 ====
Wednesday, November 11, 14:30

Sheet C	1	2	3	4	5	6	7	8	9	10	Final
Kazakhstan (Ten)	0	0	1	0	0	0	X	X	X	X	1
China (Liu)	1	2	0	4	4	2	X	X	X	X	13

Sheet E	1	2	3	4	5	6	7	8	9	10	Final
New Zealand (Farley)	1	0	0	0	0	3	0	1	0	X	5
South Korea (Kim)	0	2	2	3	1	0	1	0	4	X	13

==== Draw 8 ====
Thursday, November 12, 9:00

Sheet C	1	2	3	4	5	6	7	8	9	10	Final
Japan (Fujisawa)	0	0	0	0	0	1	0	X	X	X	1
South Korea (Kim)	0	0	1	2	4	0	2	X	X	X	9

Sheet E	1	2	3	4	5	6	7	8	9	10	Final
Kazakhstan (Ten)	0	2	0	1	0	2	0	0	1	X	6
New Zealand (Farley)	2	0	2	0	2	0	1	1	0	X	8

==== Draw 9 ====
Thursday, November 12, 14:30

Sheet B	1	2	3	4	5	6	7	8	9	10	Final
China (Liu)	0	2	0	0	2	1	1	1	1	0	8
South Korea (Kim)	2	0	2	2	0	0	0	0	0	1	7

Sheet D	1	2	3	4	5	6	7	8	9	10	Final
New Zealand (Farley)	1	0	0	1	0	1	0	0	0	X	3
Japan (Fujisawa)	0	3	1	0	1	0	0	2	0	X	7

==== Draw 10 ====
Friday, November 13, 14:30

Sheet B	1	2	3	4	5	6	7	8	9	10	Final
Kazakhstan (Ten)	0	0	1	0	1	0	X	X	X	X	2
Japan (Fujisawa)	1	2	0	2	0	6	X	X	X	X	11

Sheet D	1	2	3	4	5	6	7	8	9	10	Final
China (Liu)	2	0	3	3	1	3	X	X	X	X	12
New Zealand (Farley)	0	1	0	0	0	0	X	X	X	X	1

=== Tiebreaker ===
Friday, November 13, 19:00

Sheet E	1	2	3	4	5	6	7	8	9	10	Final
Kazakhstan (Ten)	0	2	0	0	2	2	0	0	2	2	10
New Zealand (Farley)	1	0	2	1	0	0	2	0	0	0	6

=== Playoffs ===
Semifinals
1	Japan	10
4	Kazakhstan	2
2	South Korea	7
3	China	6

Final
1	Japan	8
2	South Korea	7

Bronze-medal game
4	Kazakhstan	0
3	China	16

==== Semifinals ====
Saturday, November 14, 9:00

Sheet D	1	2	3	4	5	6	7	8	9	10	Final
Japan (Fujisawa)	1	1	1	4	0	0	3	0	X	X	10
Kazakhstan (Ten)	0	0	0	0	0	1	0	1	X	X	2

Sheet C	1	2	3	4	5	6	7	8	9	10	Final
South Korea (Kim)	1	0	2	0	1	0	1	1	1	0	7
China (Liu)	0	1	0	2	0	2	0	0	0	1	6

==== Bronze-medal game ====
Saturday, November 14, 14:30

Sheet D	1	2	3	4	5	6	7	8	9	10	Final
Kazakhstan (Ten)	0	0	0	0	0	0	0	0	X	X	0
China (Liu)	2	2	2	3	0	3	1	3	X	X	16

==== Gold-medal game ====
Saturday, November 14, 14:30

Sheet E	1	2	3	4	5	6	7	8	9	10	Final
Japan (Fujisawa)	2	0	2	0	0	2	0	1	1	0	8
South Korea (Kim)	0	1	0	3	0	0	2	0	0	1	7
