= 2013 Pacific-Asia Curling Championships =

- Host city: Shanghai, China
- Arena: Fei Yang Skating Centre
- Dates: November 11–19
- Men's winner: China
- Skip: Liu Rui
- Third: Xu Xiaoming
- Second: Ba Dexin
- Lead: Zang Jialiang
- Alternate: Zou Dejia
- Coach: Li Hongchen
- Finalist: Japan (Yusuke Morozumi)
- Women's winner: South Korea
- Skip: Kim Ji-sun
- Third: Gim Un-chi
- Second: Shin Mi-sung
- Lead: Lee Seul-bee
- Alternate: Um Min-ji
- Coach: Chung Young-sup
- Finalist: China (Wang Bingyu)

The 2013 Pacific-Asia Curling Championships took place from November 11 to 19 at the Fei Yang Skating Centre in Shanghai, China. South Korea were the women's champions, their second title after winning the 2010 Pacific Curling Championships, while China won the men's tournament, extending their winning streak to seven years. The championships served as the Pacific zone qualifiers for the World Curling Championships. The top two women's teams, China and South Korea, qualified for the 2014 Ford World Women's Curling Championship in Saint John, New Brunswick. As the 2014 World Men's Curling Championship will be hosted in Beijing, China, with the hosts as automatic qualifiers, Japan was the single men's team that advanced to the World Championship.

== Competition format ==
The men's tournament had six teams competing, while the women's tournament had five teams, with both tournaments utilizing a double round-robin format. At the conclusion of the round robin tournaments, the top four men's and women's teams played in the semifinals. The semifinal rounds will be a best-of-five series, with the two games that the teams played in the round robin counted as the first and second games in the best-of-five series. The medal round, as in previous years, consisted of single games.

== Men ==
=== Teams ===
The teams are listed as follows:

Australia	China	Chinese Taipei
Fourth: Ian Palangio Skip: Hugh Millikin; Second: Duncan Clark; Lead: Angus Young	Skip: Liu Rui Third: Xu Xiaoming; Second: Ba Dexin; Lead: Zang Jialiang; Alternate: Zou Dejia	Skip: Randolph Shen Third: Brendon Liu; Second: Nicholas Hsu; Lead: Justin Hsu; Alternate: Steve Koo
Japan	New Zealand	South Korea
Skip: Yusuke Morozumi Third: Tsuyoshi Yamaguchi; Second: Tetsuro Shimizu; Lead: Kosuke Morozumi; Alternate: Shinya Abe	Skip: Peter de Boer Third: Sean Becker; Second: Scott Becker; Lead: Kenny Thomson; Alternate: Philip Dowling	Skip: Kim Soo-hyuk Third: Kim Tae-hwan; Second: Park Jong-duk; Lead: Nam Yoon-ho; Alternate: Lee Ye-jun

=== Round-robin standings ===
Country	Skip	W	L
Japan	Yusuke Morozumi	8	2
New Zealand	Peter de Boer	7	3
China	Liu Rui	6	4
South Korea	Kim Soo-hyuk	5	5
Chinese Taipei	Randolph Shen	4	6
Australia	Hugh Millikin	0	10

=== Round-robin results ===
All draw times listed in China Standard Time (UTC+8).

==== Draw 1 ====
Tuesday, November 12, 9:00

Sheet B	1	2	3	4	5	6	7	8	9	10	Final
South Korea (Kim)	0	0	0	0	0	0	0	0	X	X	0
Japan (Morozumi)	0	0	0	2	1	1	1	3	X	X	8

Sheet C	1	2	3	4	5	6	7	8	9	10	Final
China (Liu)	2	0	1	0	0	0	1	1	0	1	6
New Zealand (de Boer)	0	1	0	0	0	1	0	0	2	0	4

Sheet D	1	2	3	4	5	6	7	8	9	10	Final
Australia (Millikin)	1	0	0	2	0	2	0	0	0	X	5
Chinese Taipei (Shen)	0	0	2	0	2	0	1	1	1	X	7

==== Draw 2 ====
Tuesday, November 12, 19:000

Sheet A	1	2	3	4	5	6	7	8	9	10	Final
Chinese Taipei (Shen)	1	1	0	0	2	0	1	3	X	X	8
China (Liu)	0	0	1	1	0	1	0	0	X	X	3

Sheet B	1	2	3	4	5	6	7	8	9	10	Final
Australia (Millikin)	2	0	0	2	0	0	X	X	X	X	4
Japan (Morozumi)	0	2	2	0	4	4	X	X	X	X	12

Sheet D	1	2	3	4	5	6	7	8	9	10	Final
South Korea (Kim)	0	1	0	0	1	1	0	1	0	X	4
New Zealand (de Boer)	1	0	1	1	0	0	1	0	3	X	7

==== Draw 4 ====
Wednesday, November 13, 09:00

Sheet A	1	2	3	4	5	6	7	8	9	10	Final
South Korea (Kim)	3	0	0	3	1	0	3	1	X	X	11
China (Liu)	0	3	1	0	0	1	0	0	X	X	5

Sheet B	1	2	3	4	5	6	7	8	9	10	Final
New Zealand (de Boer)	2	0	2	1	1	0	1	0	2	X	9
Australia (Millikin)	0	1	0	0	0	1	0	2	0	X	4

Sheet D	1	2	3	4	5	6	7	8	9	10	Final
Chinese Taipei (Shen)	0	1	0	1	0	0	3	0	1	0	6
Japan (Morozumi)	2	0	1	0	3	0	0	1	0	1	8

==== Draw 6 ====
Wednesday, November 13, 19:00

Sheet A	1	2	3	4	5	6	7	8	9	10	Final
Chinese Taipei (Shen)	2	0	2	0	1	0	1	0	0	0	6
New Zealand (de Boer)	0	1	0	1	0	1	0	0	1	1	5

Sheet C	1	2	3	4	5	6	7	8	9	10	Final
Japan (Morozumi)	1	0	2	1	0	0	4	2	X	X	10
China (Liu)	0	1	0	0	0	2	0	0	X	X	3

Sheet D	1	2	3	4	5	6	7	8	9	10	Final
Australia (Millikin)	0	1	0	2	0	1	0	2	0	X	6
South Korea (Kim)	1	0	3	0	1	0	3	0	1	X	9

==== Draw 7 ====
Thursday, November 14, 9:00

Sheet A	1	2	3	4	5	6	7	8	9	10	Final
China (Liu)	6	0	1	3	0	0	X	X	X	X	10
Australia (Millikin)	0	0	0	0	0	1	X	X	X	X	1

Sheet B	1	2	3	4	5	6	7	8	9	10	Final
Japan (Morozumi)	1	0	2	2	0	0	0	2	0	0	7
New Zealand (de Boer)	0	1	0	0	1	2	1	0	2	1	8

Sheet C	1	2	3	4	5	6	7	8	9	10	Final
Chinese Taipei (Shen)	1	0	0	0	0	1	0	2	0	1	5
South Korea (Kim)	0	1	0	0	1	0	2	0	2	0	6

==== Draw 9 ====
Thursday, November 14, 19:00

Sheet A	1	2	3	4	5	6	7	8	9	10	Final
Japan (Morozumi)	0	2	0	2	0	2	0	2	X	X	8
South Korea (Kim)	1	0	1	0	1	0	1	0	X	X	4

Sheet B	1	2	3	4	5	6	7	8	9	10	Final
Chinese Taipei (Shen)	1	1	0	3	0	0	0	1	1	1	8
Australia (Millikin)	0	0	2	0	0	4	1	0	0	0	7

Sheet D	1	2	3	4	5	6	7	8	9	10	Final
New Zealand (de Boer)	0	0	0	0	1	0	1	0	X	X	2
China (Liu)	1	1	1	1	0	1	0	4	X	X	9

==== Draw 11 ====
Friday, November 15, 14:00

Sheet A	1	2	3	4	5	6	7	8	9	10	Final
China (Liu)	0	3	0	1	0	0	3	0	X	X	7
Chinese Taipei (Shen)	0	0	1	0	1	0	0	1	X	X	3

Sheet C	1	2	3	4	5	6	7	8	9	10	Final
New Zealand (de Boer)	0	3	1	0	2	0	4	0	0	1	11
South Korea (Kim)	2	0	0	4	0	2	0	1	1	0	10

Sheet D	1	2	3	4	5	6	7	8	9	10	Final
Japan (Morozumi)	1	0	1	0	1	0	2	0	1	X	6
Australia (Millikin)	0	1	0	1	0	1	0	1	0	X	4

==== Draw 12 ====
Saturday, November 16, 9:30

Sheet A	1	2	3	4	5	6	7	8	9	10	Final
Australia (Millikin)	1	0	1	0	1	0	X	X	X	X	3
New Zealand (de Boer)	0	3	0	1	0	6	X	X	X	X	10

Sheet B	1	2	3	4	5	6	7	8	9	10	Final
China (Liu)	2	0	0	0	0	2	0	3	X	X	7
South Korea (Kim)	0	0	1	0	1	0	1	0	X	X	3

Sheet C	1	2	3	4	5	6	7	8	9	10	Final
Japan (Morozumi)	1	0	3	0	2	0	2	0	1	X	9
Chinese Taipei (Shen)	0	2	0	1	0	1	0	1	0	X	5

==== Draw 14 ====
Saturday, November 16, 19:30

Sheet B	1	2	3	4	5	6	7	8	9	10	Final
New Zealand (de Boer)	1	0	0	2	3	0	2	2	X	X	10
Chinese Taipei (Shen)	0	1	1	0	0	2	0	0	X	X	4

Sheet C	1	2	3	4	5	6	7	8	9	10	Final
South Korea (Kim)	2	0	3	2	0	0	3	X	X	X	10
Australia (Millikin)	0	1	0	0	1	1	0	X	X	X	3

Sheet D	1	2	3	4	5	6	7	8	9	10	11	Final
China (Liu)	2	0	0	1	1	0	2	0	1	0	0	7
Japan (Morozumi)	0	2	1	0	0	1	0	2	0	1	1	8

==== Draw 15 ====
Sunday, November 17, 9:00

Sheet A	1	2	3	4	5	6	7	8	9	10	Final
New Zealand (de Boer)	3	0	1	0	0	1	1	1	0	2	9
Japan (Morozumi)	0	1	0	2	1	0	0	0	3	0	7

Sheet D	1	2	3	4	5	6	7	8	9	10	Final
South Korea (Kim)	3	0	2	0	0	1	0	3	0	X	9
Chinese Taipei (Shen)	0	1	0	0	3	0	2	0	1	X	7

==== Draw 16 ====
Sunday, November 17, 14:00

Sheet B	1	2	3	4	5	6	7	8	9	10	Final
Australia (Millikin)	0	1	0	0	1	0	1	1	0	X	4
China (Liu)	1	0	2	3	0	1	0	0	2	X	9

=== Playoffs ===
Semifinals
1	Japan	8	8	9	–	–
4	South Korea	0	4	7	–	–
2	New Zealand	4	2	7	–	–
3	China	6	9	11	–	–

Gold-medal game
1	Japan	6
3	China	9
Bronze-medal game
4	South Korea	7
2	New Zealand	6

==== Semifinals ====
===== Game 3 =====
Monday, November 18, 9:00

Sheet A	1	2	3	4	5	6	7	8	9	10	Final
South Korea (Kim)	0	1	0	1	1	0	4	0	0	0	7
Japan (Morozumi)	1	0	1	0	0	2	0	4	0	1	9

Sheet B	1	2	3	4	5	6	7	8	9	10	Final
China (Liu)	0	2	0	3	2	0	0	0	2	2	11
New Zealand (de Boer)	2	0	1	0	0	0	2	2	0	0	7

==== Bronze-medal game ====
Tuesday, November 19, 14:00

Sheet A	1	2	3	4	5	6	7	8	9	10	Final
South Korea (Kim)	0	1	1	0	1	0	2	0	1	1	7
New Zealand (de Boer)	1	0	0	2	0	2	0	1	0	0	6

==== Gold-medal game ====
Tuesday, November 19, 14:00

Sheet B	1	2	3	4	5	6	7	8	9	10	Final
China (Liu)	0	2	0	0	3	1	0	0	2	1	9
Japan (Morozumi)	3	0	1	0	0	0	2	0	0	0	6

Japan qualified for the 2014 World Men's Curling Championship by making the final

== Women ==
=== Teams ===
The teams are listed as follows:

Australia	China	Japan	New Zealand	South Korea
Skip: Kim Forge Fourth: Sandy Gagnon; Second: Anne Powell; Lead: Blair Murray	Skip: Wang Bingyu Third: Liu Yin; Second: Yue Qingshuang; Lead: Zhou Yan; Alternate: Jiang Yilun	Skip: Ayumi Ogasawara Third: Yumie Funayama; Second: Kaho Onodera; Lead: Michiko Tomabechi; Alternate: Chinami Yoshida	Fourth: Thivya Jeyaranjan Skip: Chelsea Farley; Second: Tessa Farley; Lead: Waverley Taylor; Alternate: Elizabeth Matthews	Skip: Kim Ji-sun Third: Gim Un-chi; Second: Shin Mi-sung; Lead: Lee Seul-bee; Alternate: Um Min-ji

=== Round-robin standings ===
Final round-robin standings

Country	Skip	W	L
South Korea	Kim Ji-Sun	7	1
China	Wang Bingyu	7	1
Japan	Ayumi Ogasawara	4	4
New Zealand	Chelsea Farley	2	6
Australia	Kim Forge	0	8

=== Round-robin results ===
All draw times listed in China Standard Time (UTC+8).

==== Draw 1 ====
Tuesday, November 12, 9:00

Sheet A	1	2	3	4	5	6	7	8	9	10	Final
Japan (Ogasawara)	1	0	0	0	0	1	1	0	1	0	4
South Korea (Kim)	0	1	1	2	1	0	0	2	0	1	8

==== Draw 2 ====
Tuesday, November 12, 14:00

Sheet B	1	2	3	4	5	6	7	8	9	10	Final
Japan (Ogasawara)	0	1	0	1	1	0	0	1	0	X	4
China (Wang)	0	0	4	0	0	0	1	0	3	X	8

Sheet C	1	2	3	4	5	6	7	8	9	10	Final
Australia (Forge)	0	0	0	1	0	0	2	0	0	X	3
South Korea (Kim)	0	2	1	0	1	1	0	1	1	X	7

==== Draw 3 ====
Tuesday, November 12, 19:00

Sheet C	1	2	3	4	5	6	7	8	9	10	Final
New Zealand (Farley)	0	2	0	1	0	0	2	0	X	X	5
China (Wang)	2	0	4	0	2	2	0	2	X	X	12

==== Draw 5 ====
Wednesday, November 13, 14:00

Sheet B	1	2	3	4	5	6	7	8	9	10	Final
Australia (Forge)	1	0	2	0	3	0	0	0	0	0	6
New Zealand (Farley)	0	2	0	1	0	1	1	1	1	1	8

Sheet C	1	2	3	4	5	6	7	8	9	10	Final
South Korea (Kim)	2	0	0	2	1	0	4	X	X	X	9
China (Wang)	0	1	0	0	0	1	0	X	X	X	2

==== Draw 7 ====
Thursday, November 14, 9:00

Sheet A	1	2	3	4	5	6	7	8	9	10	Final
Australia (Forge)	0	0	0	1	0	0	X	X	X	X	1
China (Wang)	2	1	1	0	3	1	X	X	X	X	8

==== Draw 8 ====
Thursday, November 14, 14:00

Sheet A	1	2	3	4	5	6	7	8	9	10	Final
Australia (Forge)	1	0	0	0	0	1	2	0	0	0	4
Japan (Ogasawara)	0	1	1	2	0	0	0	1	1	1	7

Sheet D	1	2	3	4	5	6	7	8	9	10	Final
South Korea (Kim)	1	1	2	3	2	0	X	X	X	X	9
New Zealand (Farley)	0	0	0	0	0	1	X	X	X	X	1

==== Draw 9 ====
Thursday, November 14, 19:00

Sheet A	1	2	3	4	5	6	7	8	9	10	Final
Japan (Ogasawara)	1	0	3	2	1	2	0	X	X	X	9
New Zealand (Farley)	0	1	0	0	0	0	1	X	X	X	2

==== Draw 10 ====
Friday, November 15, 9:00

Sheet A	1	2	3	4	5	6	7	8	9	10	Final
China (Wang)	2	1	0	2	1	0	2	2	X	X	10
New Zealand (Farley)	0	0	1	0	0	1	0	0	X	X	2

Sheet B	1	2	3	4	5	6	7	8	9	10	Final
South Korea (Kim)	0	2	1	0	1	0	2	3	X	X	9
Japan (Ogasawara)	0	0	0	1	0	2	0	0	X	X	3

==== Draw 11 ====
Friday, November 15, 14:00

Sheet B	1	2	3	4	5	6	7	8	9	10	Final
China (Wang)	1	0	1	2	2	1	0	X	X	X	7
Australia (Forge)	0	1	0	0	0	0	1	X	X	X	2

==== Draw 12 ====
Saturday, November 16, 9:00

Sheet A	1	2	3	4	5	6	7	8	9	10	Final
New Zealand (Farley)	0	1	0	1	0	0	0	1	0	X	3
Japan (Ogasawara)	1	0	0	0	3	2	1	0	4	X	11

==== Draw 13 ====
Saturday, November 16, 14:30

Sheet C	1	2	3	4	5	6	7	8	9	10	11	Final
New Zealand (Farley)	0	0	0	0	3	0	3	0	1	0	1	8
Australia (Forge)	0	0	2	1	0	1	0	2	0	1	0	7

Sheet D	1	2	3	4	5	6	7	8	9	10	Final
China (Wang)	1	1	0	2	0	4	0	1	1	X	10
South Korea (Kim)	0	0	1	0	1	0	3	0	0	X	5

==== Draw 14 ====
Saturday, November 16, 19:30

Sheet A	1	2	3	4	5	6	7	8	9	10	Final
South Korea (Kim)	3	0	2	0	4	1	X	X	X	X	10
Australia (Forge)	0	1	0	2	0	0	X	X	X	X	3

==== Draw 15 ====
Sunday, November 17, 9:00

Sheet B	1	2	3	4	5	6	7	8	9	10	Final
New Zealand (Farley)	1	0	0	1	0	0	0	X	X	X	2
South Korea (Kim)	0	2	1	0	4	1	1	X	X	X	9

Sheet C	1	2	3	4	5	6	7	8	9	10	Final
China (Wang)	1	0	0	2	0	4	1	0	3	X	11
Japan (Ogasawara)	0	1	1	0	1	0	0	2	0	X	5

==== Draw 16 ====
Sunday, November 17, 14:00

Sheet B	1	2	3	4	5	6	7	8	9	10	Final
Japan (Ogasawara)	5	2	0	3	2	0	X	X	X	X	12
Australia (Forge)	0	0	1	0	0	2	X	X	X	X	3

=== Playoffs ===
Semifinals
1	South Korea	9	9	9	–	–
4	New Zealand	1	2	5	–	–
2	China	8	11	12	–	–
3	Japan	4	5	6	–	–

Gold-medal game
1	South Korea	9
2	China	8
Bronze-medal game
4	New Zealand	3
3	Japan	11

==== Semifinals ====
===== Game 3 =====
Monday, November 18, 9:30

Sheet C	1	2	3	4	5	6	7	8	9	10	Final
South Korea (Kim)	2	0	0	2	1	1	1	2	0	X	9
New Zealand (Farley)	0	1	3	0	0	0	0	0	1	X	5

Sheet D	1	2	3	4	5	6	7	8	9	10	Final
China (Wang)	3	0	2	1	0	0	3	0	3	X	12
Japan (Ogasawara)	0	2	0	0	1	1	0	2	0	X	6

==== Bronze-medal game ====
Tuesday, November 19, 14:00

Sheet D	1	2	3	4	5	6	7	8	9	10	Final
New Zealand (Farley)	0	0	2	0	0	0	0	1	X	X	3
Japan (Ogasawara)	2	4	0	0	0	1	4	0	X	X	11

==== Gold-medal game ====
Tuesday, November 19, 14:00

Sheet C	1	2	3	4	5	6	7	8	9	10	Final
China (Wang)	0	1	0	0	2	4	0	0	1	0	8
South Korea (Kim)	0	0	1	2	0	0	2	1	0	3	9

South Korea and China qualified for the 2014 Ford World Women's Curling Championship
