= Nam Yoon-ho =

South Korean curler

- Curler
- Born: January 19, 1984 (age 42)

Team
- Curling club: Gangwon Curling, Gangwon Province

Curling career
- Member Association: South Korea
- World Championship: 2 (2011, 2016)
- Pacific-Asia Championship: 6 (2008, 2010, 2013, 2014, 2015, 2016)
Medal record
Men's curling
Representing South Korea
Pacific-Asia Championships
Gold medal – first place	2015 Almaty
Silver medal – second place	2010 Uiseong
Bronze medal – third place	2013 Shanghai
Bronze medal – third place	2014 Karuizawa
Bronze medal – third place	2016 Uiseong
Asian Winter Games
Bronze medal – third place	2017 Sapporo
Representing Gangwon
Korean Men's Championship
Gold medal – first place	2013 Chuncheon
Gold medal – first place	2014 Chongju
Gold medal – first place	2015 Icheon
Gold medal – first place	2016 Uiseong
Silver medal – second place	2017 Icheon
Silver medal – second place	2018 Jincheon
Bronze medal – third place	2011 Uijeongbu

Nam Yoon-ho (born January 19, 1984) is a South Korean male curler.

At the international level, he is a 2015 Pacific-Asia champion.

At the national level, he is a four-time Korean men's champion.

== Teams ==
Season	Skip	Third	Second	Lead	Alternate	Coach	Events
2008–09	Lee Dong-keun	Kim Soo-hyuk	Park Jong-duk	Nam Yoon-ho	Lee Kyn-heon	Sin Young-Kook, Lee Jong-Sun	PACC 2008 (4th)
2010–11	Lee Dong-keun	Kim Soo-hyuk	Kim Tae-hwan	Nam Yoon-ho	Lee Ye-jun	Lee Doo Sung (WCC)	PACC 2010 (silver); WCC 2011 (11th)
2013–14	Kim Soo-hyuk	Kim Tae-hwan	Park Jong-duk	Nam Yoon-ho	Lee Ye-jun	Yang Se Young	PACC 2013 (bronze)
2014–15	Kim Soo-hyuk	Kim Tae-hwan	Park Jong-duk	Nam Yoon-ho	Yoo Min-hyeon	Yang Se Young	PACC 2014 (bronze)
2015–16	Kim Soo-hyuk	Kim Tae-hwan	Park Jong-duk	Nam Yoon-ho	Yoo Min-hyeon (PACC, WCC)	Yang Se Young (PACC, WCC)	PACC 2015 (gold); WCC 2016 (11th); KMCC 2016 (gold)
2016–17	Kim Soo-hyuk	Kim Tae-hwan	Park Jong-duk	Nam Yoon-ho	Yoo Min-hyeon	Yang Se Young	PACC 2016 (bronze)
2016–17	Kim Soo-hyuk	Park Jong-duk	Kim Tae-hwan	Nam Yoon-ho	Yoo Min-hyeon	Yang Se Young	AWG 2017 (bronze)
2017–18	Kim Soo-hyuk	Park Jong-duk	Kim Tae-hwan	Nam Yoon-ho			
2018–19	Park Jong-duk	Nam Yoon-ho	Yoo Min-hyeon	Kim Jeong-min			
2019–20	Park Jong-duk	Nam Yoon-ho	Yoo Min-hyeon	Kim Jeong-min			
