= 2011 World Men's Curling Championship =

- Host city: Regina, Saskatchewan, Canada
- Arena: Brandt Centre
- Dates: April 2–10, 2011
- Attendance: 99,445
- Winner: Canada
- Curling club: Charleswood CC, Winnipeg, Manitoba
- Skip: Jeff Stoughton
- Third: Jon Mead
- Second: Reid Carruthers
- Lead: Steve Gould
- Alternate: Garth Smith
- Coach: Norm Gould
- Finalist: Scotland (Tom Brewster)

The 2011 World Men's Curling Championship (branded as Ford World Men's Curling Championship 2011 presented by Richardson for sponsorship reasons) was held at the Brandt Centre in Regina, Saskatchewan, Canada from April 2–10, 2011.

In the final, Jeff Stoughton skipped the Canadian rink to a 6–5 victory over Scotland's Tom Brewster, who was playing in his first World Championship. Scotland took the early lead, going up 3–1 after four ends, thanks to successful double and triple take outs. Stoughton picked out a Scottish stone in the four-foot in the fifth end to score three, and take a 4–3 lead into the break. After Scotland tied the game in the sixth, Canada blanked the seventh, with Stoughton showing off his 360 degree "spin-o-rama" delivery on his last, as it was only a throw-through. In the eighth, Canada scored a deuce, thanks to a draw to the button for Stoughton, taking a 6–4 lead. In the 9th, Brewster was wide on his takeout attempt for two, settling for a single, to trail 6–5 heading into the final end. In the 10th, Brewster was light on his final rock, and Stoughton didn't have to throw his final rock, as victory had been assured. The gold medal was Stoughton's second and Canada's 33rd gold medal at the world. A sellout crowd of 5,854 spectators attended the game.

Sweden's Niklas Edin rink won the bronze medal over Norway's Thomas Ulsrud, 7–6. This broke a seven year medal-less streak for Sweden.

== Qualification ==
- Canada (host country & defending champions)
- United States
- Top eight teams from the 2010 European Curling Championships
  - Switzerland
  - Norway
  - Germany
  - Denmark
  - Scotland
  - Sweden
  - Czech Republic
  - France
- Top two teams from the 2010 Pacific Curling Championships
  - China (winner)
  - South Korea (runner-up)

== Teams ==
| Canada | China | Czech Republic |
|---|---|---|
| Charleswood CC, Winnipeg Skip: Jeff Stoughton; Third: Jon Mead; Second: Reid Carruthers; Lead: Steve Gould; Alternate: Garth Smith | Heilongjiang Club, Harbin Skip: Chen Lu'an; Third: Li Guangxu; Second: Ji Yansong; Lead: Guo Wenli; Alternate: Ba Dexin | CK Brno, Brno Skip: Jiri Snítil; Third: Martin Snítil; Second: Jindřich Kitzberger; Lead: Marek Vydra; Alternate: Jakub Bares |
| Denmark | France | Germany |
| Hvidovre CC, Hvidovre Skip: Tommy Stjerne; Third: Per Berg; Second: Peter Andersen; Lead: Anders Søderblom; Alternate: Jan Nebelong | Chamonix CC, Chamonix Fourth: Tony Angiboust; Skip: Thomas Dufour; Second: Lionel Roux; Lead: Wilfrid Coulot; Alternate: Jan Ducroz | CC Füssen, Füssen Skip: Andy Kapp; Third: Andreas Lang; Second: Daniel Herberg; Lead: Markus Messenzehl; Alternate: Holger Höhne |
| Norway | Scotland | South Korea |
| Snarøen CC, Oslo Skip: Thomas Ulsrud; Third: Torger Nergård; Second: Christoffer Svae; Lead: Håvard Vad Petersson; Alternate: Markus Snøve Høiberg | Curl Aberdeen, Aberdeen Skip: Tom Brewster; Third: Greg Drummond; Second: Scott Andrews; Lead: Michael Goodfellow; Alternate: Duncan Fernie | Gangwon Province CC, Gangwon-do Skip: Lee Dong-keun; Third: Kim Soo-hyuk; Second: Kim Tae-hwan; Lead: Nam Yoon-ho; Alternate: Lee Ye-jun |
| Sweden | Switzerland | United States |
| Karlstads CK, Karlstad Skip: Niklas Edin; Third: Sebastian Kraupp; Second: Fredrik Lindberg; Lead: Viktor Kjäll; Alternate: Oskar Eriksson | St. Moritz CC, St. Moritz Skip: Christof Schwaller; Third: Marco Ramstein; Second: Robert Hürlimann; Lead: Urs Eichhorn; Alternate: Sven Michel | Bemidji CC, Bemidji Skip: Pete Fenson; Third: Shawn Rojeski; Second: Joe Polo; Lead: Ryan Brunt; Alternate: Scott Baird |

== Round-robin standings ==
Final round-robin standings

Key
| Teams to playoffs |
| Teams to tiebreaker |

| Country | Skip | W | L | PF | PA | Ends Won | Ends Lost | Blank Ends | Stolen Ends | Shot Pct. |
|---|---|---|---|---|---|---|---|---|---|---|
| Canada | Jeff Stoughton | 10 | 1 | 84 | 49 | 47 | 37 | 17 | 11 | 90% |
| Scotland | Tom Brewster | 9 | 2 | 72 | 54 | 42 | 38 | 22 | 10 | 83% |
| Sweden | Niklas Edin | 7 | 4 | 81 | 58 | 50 | 39 | 9 | 13 | 90% |
| Norway | Thomas Ulsrud | 7 | 4 | 64 | 63 | 47 | 42 | 18 | 13 | 84% |
| France | Thomas Dufour | 7 | 4 | 75 | 64 | 48 | 37 | 10 | 13 | 83% |
| Germany | Andy Kapp | 6 | 5 | 71 | 64 | 48 | 46 | 13 | 11 | 80% |
| Switzerland | Christof Schwaller | 6 | 5 | 68 | 67 | 47 | 43 | 15 | 16 | 85% |
| Czech Republic | Jiri Snítil | 5 | 6 | 58 | 72 | 38 | 43 | 14 | 7 | 81% |
| China | Chen Lu'an | 4 | 7 | 51 | 71 | 35 | 47 | 24 | 4 | 83% |
| United States | Pete Fenson | 3 | 8 | 59 | 67 | 40 | 47 | 14 | 9 | 85% |
| South Korea | Lee Dong-keun | 2 | 9 | 61 | 85 | 39 | 47 | 13 | 7 | 80% |
| Denmark | Tommy Stjerne | 0 | 11 | 50 | 87 | 37 | 45 | 12 | 6 | 78% |

Sweden placed third by virtue of a pre-event draw challenge used to rank teams in case round-robin results failed to provide separation.

== Results ==
All times local (Central Standard Time)

=== Draw 1 ===
Saturday, April 2, 1:30pm

| Sheet A | 1 | 2 | 3 | 4 | 5 | 6 | 7 | 8 | 9 | 10 | Final |
|---|---|---|---|---|---|---|---|---|---|---|---|
| Canada (Stoughton) 🔨 | 1 | 0 | 0 | 1 | 3 | 0 | 0 | 1 | 2 | X | 8 |
| Switzerland (Schwaller) | 0 | 0 | 2 | 0 | 0 | 1 | 1 | 0 | 0 | X | 4 |

| Sheet B | 1 | 2 | 3 | 4 | 5 | 6 | 7 | 8 | 9 | 10 | Final |
|---|---|---|---|---|---|---|---|---|---|---|---|
| United States (Fenson) 🔨 | 2 | 1 | 0 | 1 | 0 | 2 | 0 | 1 | 0 | X | 7 |
| Denmark (Stjerne) | 0 | 0 | 1 | 0 | 1 | 0 | 1 | 0 | 1 | X | 4 |

| Sheet C | 1 | 2 | 3 | 4 | 5 | 6 | 7 | 8 | 9 | 10 | Final |
|---|---|---|---|---|---|---|---|---|---|---|---|
| Czech Republic (Snítil) 🔨 | 1 | 0 | 0 | 1 | 0 | 0 | 1 | 0 | 2 | 0 | 5 |
| France (Dufour) | 0 | 0 | 2 | 0 | 0 | 2 | 0 | 2 | 0 | 3 | 9 |

| Sheet D | 1 | 2 | 3 | 4 | 5 | 6 | 7 | 8 | 9 | 10 | 11 | Final |
|---|---|---|---|---|---|---|---|---|---|---|---|---|
| Norway (Ulsrud) | 0 | 0 | 2 | 1 | 0 | 0 | 0 | 2 | 1 | 1 | 1 | 8 |
| South Korea (Lee) 🔨 | 0 | 3 | 0 | 0 | 2 | 1 | 1 | 0 | 0 | 0 | 0 | 7 |

=== Draw 2 ===
Saturday, April 2, 7:00pm

| Sheet A | 1 | 2 | 3 | 4 | 5 | 6 | 7 | 8 | 9 | 10 | Final |
|---|---|---|---|---|---|---|---|---|---|---|---|
| Germany (Kapp) | 0 | 0 | 0 | 2 | 0 | 2 | 0 | 0 | 0 | X | 4 |
| China (Chen) 🔨 | 0 | 0 | 2 | 0 | 1 | 0 | 1 | 1 | 1 | X | 6 |

| Sheet B | 1 | 2 | 3 | 4 | 5 | 6 | 7 | 8 | 9 | 10 | Final |
|---|---|---|---|---|---|---|---|---|---|---|---|
| France (Dufour) 🔨 | 0 | 2 | 1 | 0 | 1 | 2 | 0 | 2 | X | X | 8 |
| South Korea (Lee) | 0 | 0 | 0 | 1 | 0 | 0 | 1 | 0 | X | X | 2 |

| Sheet C | 1 | 2 | 3 | 4 | 5 | 6 | 7 | 8 | 9 | 10 | Final |
|---|---|---|---|---|---|---|---|---|---|---|---|
| Sweden (Edin) 🔨 | 1 | 0 | 0 | 2 | 0 | 2 | 0 | 0 | 1 | 0 | 6 |
| Scotland (Brewster) | 0 | 1 | 0 | 0 | 2 | 0 | 3 | 0 | 0 | 1 | 7 |

| Sheet D | 1 | 2 | 3 | 4 | 5 | 6 | 7 | 8 | 9 | 10 | Final |
|---|---|---|---|---|---|---|---|---|---|---|---|
| Denmark (Stjerne) | 0 | 1 | 3 | 0 | 0 | 0 | 1 | 0 | X | X | 5 |
| Canada (Stoughton) 🔨 | 2 | 0 | 0 | 0 | 1 | 4 | 0 | 2 | X | X | 9 |

=== Draw 3 ===
Sunday, April 3, 8:30am

| Sheet B | 1 | 2 | 3 | 4 | 5 | 6 | 7 | 8 | 9 | 10 | 11 | Final |
|---|---|---|---|---|---|---|---|---|---|---|---|---|
| Czech Republic (Snítil) 🔨 | 2 | 0 | 0 | 0 | 1 | 0 | 0 | 0 | 2 | 0 | 2 | 7 |
| Norway (Ulsrud) | 0 | 1 | 0 | 1 | 0 | 0 | 0 | 2 | 0 | 1 | 0 | 5 |

| Sheet C | 1 | 2 | 3 | 4 | 5 | 6 | 7 | 8 | 9 | 10 | Final |
|---|---|---|---|---|---|---|---|---|---|---|---|
| Switzerland (Schwaller) 🔨 | 1 | 0 | 2 | 0 | 1 | 0 | 1 | 1 | 0 | X | 6 |
| United States (Fenson) | 0 | 2 | 0 | 1 | 0 | 0 | 0 | 0 | 1 | X | 4 |

=== Draw 4 ===
Sunday, April 3, 1:30pm

| Sheet A | 1 | 2 | 3 | 4 | 5 | 6 | 7 | 8 | 9 | 10 | Final |
|---|---|---|---|---|---|---|---|---|---|---|---|
| South Korea (Lee) | 0 | 0 | 1 | 0 | 1 | 1 | 1 | 0 | 2 | X | 6 |
| Scotland (Brewster) 🔨 | 1 | 1 | 0 | 5 | 0 | 0 | 0 | 2 | 0 | X | 9 |

| Sheet B | 1 | 2 | 3 | 4 | 5 | 6 | 7 | 8 | 9 | 10 | Final |
|---|---|---|---|---|---|---|---|---|---|---|---|
| Canada (Stoughton) | 0 | 0 | 2 | 0 | 1 | 0 | 2 | 0 | 1 | 1 | 7 |
| Germany (Kapp) 🔨 | 0 | 1 | 0 | 1 | 0 | 1 | 0 | 1 | 0 | 0 | 4 |

| Sheet C | 1 | 2 | 3 | 4 | 5 | 6 | 7 | 8 | 9 | 10 | Final |
|---|---|---|---|---|---|---|---|---|---|---|---|
| China (Chen) | 0 | 0 | 3 | 1 | 0 | 1 | 0 | 2 | 0 | 0 | 7 |
| Denmark (Stjerne) 🔨 | 1 | 1 | 0 | 0 | 1 | 0 | 0 | 0 | 3 | 0 | 6 |

| Sheet D | 1 | 2 | 3 | 4 | 5 | 6 | 7 | 8 | 9 | 10 | Final |
|---|---|---|---|---|---|---|---|---|---|---|---|
| Sweden (Edin) 🔨 | 2 | 0 | 0 | 1 | 0 | 1 | 0 | 2 | 0 | 1 | 7 |
| France (Dufour) | 0 | 2 | 1 | 0 | 1 | 0 | 1 | 0 | 1 | 0 | 6 |

=== Draw 5 ===
Sunday, April 3, 7:00pm

| Sheet A | 1 | 2 | 3 | 4 | 5 | 6 | 7 | 8 | 9 | 10 | Final |
|---|---|---|---|---|---|---|---|---|---|---|---|
| Sweden (Edin) 🔨 | 2 | 0 | 0 | 2 | 3 | 0 | 4 | X | X | X | 11 |
| United States (Fenson) | 0 | 0 | 1 | 0 | 0 | 1 | 0 | X | X | X | 2 |

| Sheet B | 1 | 2 | 3 | 4 | 5 | 6 | 7 | 8 | 9 | 10 | Final |
|---|---|---|---|---|---|---|---|---|---|---|---|
| Scotland (Brewster) 🔨 | 0 | 2 | 2 | 0 | 2 | 0 | 0 | 0 | 0 | 4 | 10 |
| Switzerland (Schwaller) | 0 | 0 | 0 | 2 | 0 | 0 | 1 | 2 | 1 | 0 | 6 |

| Sheet C | 1 | 2 | 3 | 4 | 5 | 6 | 7 | 8 | 9 | 10 | Final |
|---|---|---|---|---|---|---|---|---|---|---|---|
| Norway (Ulsrud) | 0 | 0 | 2 | 0 | 1 | 0 | 1 | 3 | 1 | 0 | 8 |
| Germany (Kapp) 🔨 | 1 | 2 | 0 | 2 | 0 | 3 | 0 | 0 | 0 | 1 | 9 |

| Sheet D | 1 | 2 | 3 | 4 | 5 | 6 | 7 | 8 | 9 | 10 | Final |
|---|---|---|---|---|---|---|---|---|---|---|---|
| Czech Republic (Snítil) 🔨 | 0 | 4 | 0 | 0 | 2 | 0 | 1 | 0 | 1 | X | 8 |
| China (Chen) | 0 | 0 | 2 | 0 | 0 | 1 | 0 | 2 | 0 | X | 5 |

=== Draw 6 ===
Monday, April 4, 8:30am

| Sheet A | 1 | 2 | 3 | 4 | 5 | 6 | 7 | 8 | 9 | 10 | Final |
|---|---|---|---|---|---|---|---|---|---|---|---|
| France (Dufour) 🔨 | 2 | 0 | 1 | 0 | 0 | 2 | 0 | 3 | 0 | X | 8 |
| Denmark (Stjerne) | 0 | 1 | 0 | 1 | 1 | 0 | 1 | 0 | 1 | X | 5 |

| Sheet B | 1 | 2 | 3 | 4 | 5 | 6 | 7 | 8 | 9 | 10 | Final |
|---|---|---|---|---|---|---|---|---|---|---|---|
| China (Chen) | 0 | 0 | 0 | 0 | 1 | 0 | 0 | X | X | X | 1 |
| Sweden (Edin) 🔨 | 2 | 2 | 1 | 0 | 0 | 2 | 2 | X | X | X | 9 |

| Sheet C | 1 | 2 | 3 | 4 | 5 | 6 | 7 | 8 | 9 | 10 | Final |
|---|---|---|---|---|---|---|---|---|---|---|---|
| Canada (Stoughton) 🔨 | 2 | 0 | 2 | 0 | 2 | 0 | 0 | 0 | 1 | X | 7 |
| South Korea (Lee) | 0 | 2 | 0 | 1 | 0 | 0 | 1 | 0 | 0 | X | 4 |

| Sheet D | 1 | 2 | 3 | 4 | 5 | 6 | 7 | 8 | 9 | 10 | Final |
|---|---|---|---|---|---|---|---|---|---|---|---|
| Scotland (Brewster) 🔨 | 2 | 0 | 0 | 3 | 0 | 2 | 1 | 0 | 0 | X | 8 |
| Germany (Kapp) | 0 | 1 | 1 | 0 | 2 | 0 | 0 | 0 | 1 | X | 5 |

=== Draw 7 ===
Monday, April 4, 1:30pm

| Sheet A | 1 | 2 | 3 | 4 | 5 | 6 | 7 | 8 | 9 | 10 | Final |
|---|---|---|---|---|---|---|---|---|---|---|---|
| Norway (Ulsrud) 🔨 | 2 | 2 | 0 | 1 | 0 | 0 | 1 | 0 | 2 | X | 8 |
| Sweden (Edin) | 0 | 0 | 1 | 0 | 2 | 1 | 0 | 1 | 0 | X | 5 |

| Sheet B | 1 | 2 | 3 | 4 | 5 | 6 | 7 | 8 | 9 | 10 | Final |
|---|---|---|---|---|---|---|---|---|---|---|---|
| Germany (Kapp) | 1 | 0 | 0 | 2 | 0 | 0 | 1 | 1 | 0 | 0 | 5 |
| United States (Fenson) 🔨 | 0 | 1 | 0 | 0 | 0 | 1 | 0 | 0 | 1 | 1 | 4 |

| Sheet C | 1 | 2 | 3 | 4 | 5 | 6 | 7 | 8 | 9 | 10 | 11 | Final |
|---|---|---|---|---|---|---|---|---|---|---|---|---|
| Scotland (Brewster) | 1 | 1 | 0 | 0 | 0 | 1 | 0 | 1 | 0 | 0 | 1 | 5 |
| Czech Republic (Snítil) 🔨 | 0 | 0 | 2 | 0 | 0 | 0 | 0 | 0 | 1 | 1 | 0 | 4 |

| Sheet D | 1 | 2 | 3 | 4 | 5 | 6 | 7 | 8 | 9 | 10 | Final |
|---|---|---|---|---|---|---|---|---|---|---|---|
| China (Chen) | 0 | 0 | 0 | 0 | 0 | 0 | 1 | 0 | X | X | 1 |
| Switzerland (Schwaller) 🔨 | 1 | 2 | 1 | 0 | 1 | 1 | 0 | 1 | X | X | 7 |

=== Draw 8 ===
Monday, April 4, 7:30pm

| Sheet A | 1 | 2 | 3 | 4 | 5 | 6 | 7 | 8 | 9 | 10 | Final |
|---|---|---|---|---|---|---|---|---|---|---|---|
| United States (Fenson) 🔨 | 2 | 0 | 0 | 1 | 0 | 0 | 0 | 0 | 0 | 0 | 3 |
| Canada (Stoughton) | 0 | 0 | 2 | 0 | 0 | 0 | 0 | 1 | 1 | 1 | 5 |

| Sheet B | 1 | 2 | 3 | 4 | 5 | 6 | 7 | 8 | 9 | 10 | Final |
|---|---|---|---|---|---|---|---|---|---|---|---|
| South Korea (Lee) | 0 | 1 | 0 | 5 | 0 | 1 | 0 | 3 | X | X | 10 |
| Czech Republic (Snítil) 🔨 | 2 | 0 | 2 | 0 | 0 | 0 | 1 | 0 | X | X | 5 |

| Sheet C | 1 | 2 | 3 | 4 | 5 | 6 | 7 | 8 | 9 | 10 | Final |
|---|---|---|---|---|---|---|---|---|---|---|---|
| Switzerland (Schwaller) 🔨 | 2 | 0 | 0 | 0 | 2 | 1 | 0 | 3 | 0 | X | 8 |
| Denmark (Stjerne) | 0 | 2 | 2 | 1 | 0 | 0 | 1 | 0 | 0 | X | 6 |

| Sheet D | 1 | 2 | 3 | 4 | 5 | 6 | 7 | 8 | 9 | 10 | Final |
|---|---|---|---|---|---|---|---|---|---|---|---|
| France (Dufour) | 1 | 1 | 0 | 1 | 0 | 0 | 2 | 0 | 0 | 1 | 6 |
| Norway (Ulsrud) 🔨 | 0 | 0 | 1 | 0 | 2 | 0 | 0 | 0 | 2 | 0 | 5 |

=== Draw 9 ===
Tuesday, April 5, 8:30am

| Sheet A | 1 | 2 | 3 | 4 | 5 | 6 | 7 | 8 | 9 | 10 | Final |
|---|---|---|---|---|---|---|---|---|---|---|---|
| China (Chen) 🔨 | 0 | 0 | 1 | 0 | 1 | 0 | 1 | 0 | 0 | X | 3 |
| Scotland (Brewster) | 0 | 1 | 0 | 1 | 0 | 1 | 0 | 0 | 2 | X | 5 |

| Sheet B | 1 | 2 | 3 | 4 | 5 | 6 | 7 | 8 | 9 | 10 | Final |
|---|---|---|---|---|---|---|---|---|---|---|---|
| Switzerland (Schwaller) 🔨 | 2 | 0 | 2 | 0 | 2 | 1 | 0 | 1 | 0 | X | 7 |
| Norway (Ulsrud) | 0 | 0 | 0 | 2 | 0 | 0 | 1 | 0 | 1 | X | 4 |

| Sheet C | 1 | 2 | 3 | 4 | 5 | 6 | 7 | 8 | 9 | 10 | 11 | Final |
|---|---|---|---|---|---|---|---|---|---|---|---|---|
| Sweden (Edin) | 0 | 2 | 0 | 1 | 0 | 0 | 2 | 1 | 1 | 0 | 1 | 8 |
| Germany (Kapp) 🔨 | 1 | 0 | 3 | 0 | 1 | 1 | 0 | 0 | 0 | 1 | 0 | 7 |

| Sheet D | 1 | 2 | 3 | 4 | 5 | 6 | 7 | 8 | 9 | 10 | Final |
|---|---|---|---|---|---|---|---|---|---|---|---|
| United States (Fenson) | 1 | 0 | 0 | 5 | 0 | 2 | 0 | X | X | X | 8 |
| Czech Republic (Snítil) 🔨 | 0 | 1 | 1 | 0 | 1 | 0 | 1 | X | X | X | 4 |

=== Draw 10 ===
Tuesday, April 5, 1:30pm

| Sheet A | 1 | 2 | 3 | 4 | 5 | 6 | 7 | 8 | 9 | 10 | 11 | Final |
|---|---|---|---|---|---|---|---|---|---|---|---|---|
| Switzerland (Schwaller) 🔨 | 2 | 0 | 1 | 1 | 0 | 1 | 0 | 0 | 0 | 1 | 2 | 8 |
| Czech Republic (Snítil) | 0 | 1 | 0 | 0 | 2 | 0 | 0 | 2 | 1 | 0 | 0 | 6 |

| Sheet B | 1 | 2 | 3 | 4 | 5 | 6 | 7 | 8 | 9 | 10 | Final |
|---|---|---|---|---|---|---|---|---|---|---|---|
| France (Dufour) | 0 | 1 | 0 | 1 | 0 | 2 | 1 | 0 | 0 | X | 5 |
| Canada (Stoughton) 🔨 | 3 | 0 | 3 | 0 | 2 | 0 | 0 | 0 | 3 | X | 11 |

| Sheet C | 1 | 2 | 3 | 4 | 5 | 6 | 7 | 8 | 9 | 10 | Final |
|---|---|---|---|---|---|---|---|---|---|---|---|
| Norway (Ulsrud) 🔨 | 2 | 0 | 1 | 0 | 0 | 1 | 0 | 1 | 0 | 2 | 7 |
| United States (Fenson) | 0 | 1 | 0 | 2 | 1 | 0 | 1 | 0 | 1 | 0 | 6 |

| Sheet D | 1 | 2 | 3 | 4 | 5 | 6 | 7 | 8 | 9 | 10 | Final |
|---|---|---|---|---|---|---|---|---|---|---|---|
| Denmark (Stjerne) | 2 | 0 | 3 | 0 | 0 | 1 | 0 | 2 | 0 | X | 8 |
| South Korea (Lee) 🔨 | 0 | 1 | 0 | 3 | 1 | 0 | 4 | 0 | 1 | X | 10 |

=== Draw 11 ===
Tuesday, April 5, 7:30pm

| Sheet A | 1 | 2 | 3 | 4 | 5 | 6 | 7 | 8 | 9 | 10 | Final |
|---|---|---|---|---|---|---|---|---|---|---|---|
| Germany (Kapp) 🔨 | 0 | 1 | 2 | 0 | 4 | 1 | 0 | 1 | X | X | 9 |
| South Korea (Lee) | 0 | 0 | 0 | 1 | 0 | 0 | 2 | 0 | X | X | 3 |

| Sheet B | 1 | 2 | 3 | 4 | 5 | 6 | 7 | 8 | 9 | 10 | Final |
|---|---|---|---|---|---|---|---|---|---|---|---|
| Sweden (Edin) 🔨 | 1 | 0 | 2 | 4 | 0 | 2 | 0 | X | X | X | 9 |
| Denmark (Stjerne) | 0 | 1 | 0 | 0 | 2 | 0 | 0 | X | X | X | 3 |

| Sheet C | 1 | 2 | 3 | 4 | 5 | 6 | 7 | 8 | 9 | 10 | Final |
|---|---|---|---|---|---|---|---|---|---|---|---|
| France (Dufour) 🔨 | 1 | 0 | 1 | 3 | 2 | 0 | 3 | X | X | X | 10 |
| China (Chen) | 0 | 2 | 0 | 0 | 0 | 1 | 0 | X | X | X | 3 |

| Sheet D | 1 | 2 | 3 | 4 | 5 | 6 | 7 | 8 | 9 | 10 | Final |
|---|---|---|---|---|---|---|---|---|---|---|---|
| Canada (Stoughton) 🔨 | 2 | 1 | 0 | 1 | 0 | 0 | 1 | 0 | 2 | X | 7 |
| Scotland (Brewster) | 0 | 0 | 1 | 0 | 0 | 1 | 0 | 1 | 0 | X | 3 |

=== Draw 12 ===
Wednesday, April 6, 8:30am

| Sheet A | 1 | 2 | 3 | 4 | 5 | 6 | 7 | 8 | 9 | 10 | Final |
|---|---|---|---|---|---|---|---|---|---|---|---|
| Denmark (Stjerne) | 0 | 1 | 0 | 0 | 0 | 1 | X | X | X | X | 2 |
| Norway (Ulsrud) 🔨 | 3 | 0 | 1 | 2 | 3 | 0 | X | X | X | X | 9 |

| Sheet B | 1 | 2 | 3 | 4 | 5 | 6 | 7 | 8 | 9 | 10 | Final |
|---|---|---|---|---|---|---|---|---|---|---|---|
| United States (Fenson) 🔨 | 2 | 1 | 0 | 3 | 0 | 1 | 0 | 0 | 1 | X | 8 |
| South Korea (Lee) | 0 | 0 | 1 | 0 | 2 | 0 | 0 | 1 | 0 | X | 4 |

| Sheet C | 1 | 2 | 3 | 4 | 5 | 6 | 7 | 8 | 9 | 10 | Final |
|---|---|---|---|---|---|---|---|---|---|---|---|
| Czech Republic (Snítil) 🔨 | 0 | 1 | 0 | 2 | 1 | 0 | 0 | 0 | 0 | X | 4 |
| Canada (Stoughton) | 1 | 0 | 4 | 0 | 0 | 0 | 2 | 1 | 1 | X | 9 |

| Sheet D | 1 | 2 | 3 | 4 | 5 | 6 | 7 | 8 | 9 | 10 | Final |
|---|---|---|---|---|---|---|---|---|---|---|---|
| Switzerland (Schwaller) | 0 | 0 | 3 | 0 | 1 | 0 | 0 | 0 | 2 | 1 | 7 |
| France (Dufour) 🔨 | 0 | 2 | 0 | 1 | 0 | 4 | 0 | 1 | 0 | 0 | 8 |

=== Draw 13 ===
Wednesday, April 6, 1:30pm

| Sheet A | 1 | 2 | 3 | 4 | 5 | 6 | 7 | 8 | 9 | 10 | Final |
|---|---|---|---|---|---|---|---|---|---|---|---|
| Canada (Stoughton) | 0 | 4 | 0 | 3 | 0 | 2 | 0 | 1 | X | X | 10 |
| Sweden (Edin) 🔨 | 1 | 0 | 2 | 0 | 1 | 0 | 2 | 0 | X | X | 6 |

| Sheet B | 1 | 2 | 3 | 4 | 5 | 6 | 7 | 8 | 9 | 10 | Final |
|---|---|---|---|---|---|---|---|---|---|---|---|
| Germany (Kapp) | 0 | 1 | 0 | 2 | 0 | 1 | 0 | 1 | 0 | 1 | 6 |
| France (Dufour) 🔨 | 0 | 0 | 1 | 0 | 1 | 0 | 2 | 0 | 1 | 0 | 5 |

| Sheet C | 1 | 2 | 3 | 4 | 5 | 6 | 7 | 8 | 9 | 10 | Final |
|---|---|---|---|---|---|---|---|---|---|---|---|
| Denmark (Stjerne) | 0 | 0 | 2 | 0 | 1 | 0 | 0 | 0 | 0 | X | 3 |
| Scotland (Brewster) 🔨 | 2 | 0 | 0 | 3 | 0 | 0 | 0 | 0 | 2 | X | 7 |

| Sheet D | 1 | 2 | 3 | 4 | 5 | 6 | 7 | 8 | 9 | 10 | Final |
|---|---|---|---|---|---|---|---|---|---|---|---|
| South Korea (Lee) | 0 | 0 | 1 | 0 | 1 | 0 | 3 | 0 | 0 | X | 5 |
| China (Chen) 🔨 | 0 | 2 | 0 | 4 | 0 | 2 | 0 | 0 | 1 | X | 9 |

=== Draw 14 ===
Wednesday, April 6, 7:30pm

| Sheet A | 1 | 2 | 3 | 4 | 5 | 6 | 7 | 8 | 9 | 10 | Final |
|---|---|---|---|---|---|---|---|---|---|---|---|
| United States (Fenson) | 0 | 1 | 0 | 1 | 0 | 0 | 1 | 0 | 1 | 0 | 4 |
| China (Chen) 🔨 | 0 | 0 | 0 | 0 | 0 | 1 | 0 | 2 | 0 | 2 | 5 |

| Sheet B | 1 | 2 | 3 | 4 | 5 | 6 | 7 | 8 | 9 | 10 | Final |
|---|---|---|---|---|---|---|---|---|---|---|---|
| Norway (Ulsrud) | 0 | 2 | 0 | 0 | 3 | 1 | 0 | 0 | 0 | 1 | 7 |
| Scotland (Brewster) 🔨 | 1 | 0 | 3 | 0 | 0 | 0 | 0 | 0 | 1 | 0 | 5 |

| Sheet C | 1 | 2 | 3 | 4 | 5 | 6 | 7 | 8 | 9 | 10 | Final |
|---|---|---|---|---|---|---|---|---|---|---|---|
| Germany (Kapp) 🔨 | 0 | 0 | 2 | 0 | 0 | 1 | 1 | 0 | 2 | 1 | 7 |
| Switzerland (Schwaller) | 0 | 1 | 0 | 0 | 1 | 0 | 0 | 2 | 0 | 0 | 4 |

| Sheet D | 1 | 2 | 3 | 4 | 5 | 6 | 7 | 8 | 9 | 10 | 11 | Final |
|---|---|---|---|---|---|---|---|---|---|---|---|---|
| Czech Republic (Snítil) 🔨 | 2 | 0 | 0 | 1 | 0 | 1 | 0 | 0 | 1 | 0 | 1 | 6 |
| Sweden (Edin) | 0 | 1 | 1 | 0 | 1 | 0 | 1 | 1 | 0 | 0 | 0 | 5 |

=== Draw 15 ===
Thursday, April 7, 8:30am

| Sheet A | 1 | 2 | 3 | 4 | 5 | 6 | 7 | 8 | 9 | 10 | Final |
|---|---|---|---|---|---|---|---|---|---|---|---|
| Scotland (Brewster) 🔨 | 0 | 0 | 2 | 0 | 2 | 0 | 2 | X | X | X | 6 |
| France (Dufour) | 0 | 0 | 0 | 1 | 0 | 0 | 0 | X | X | X | 1 |

| Sheet B | 1 | 2 | 3 | 4 | 5 | 6 | 7 | 8 | 9 | 10 | Final |
|---|---|---|---|---|---|---|---|---|---|---|---|
| Canada (Stoughton) 🔨 | 2 | 0 | 1 | 1 | 0 | 0 | 0 | 0 | 0 | 1 | 5 |
| China (Chen) | 0 | 1 | 0 | 0 | 2 | 0 | 1 | 0 | 0 | 0 | 4 |

| Sheet C | 1 | 2 | 3 | 4 | 5 | 6 | 7 | 8 | 9 | 10 | Final |
|---|---|---|---|---|---|---|---|---|---|---|---|
| South Korea (Lee) 🔨 | 0 | 2 | 0 | 1 | 0 | 0 | 1 | 0 | X | X | 4 |
| Sweden (Edin) | 0 | 0 | 1 | 0 | 1 | 4 | 0 | 2 | X | X | 8 |

| Sheet D | 1 | 2 | 3 | 4 | 5 | 6 | 7 | 8 | 9 | 10 | Final |
|---|---|---|---|---|---|---|---|---|---|---|---|
| Germany (Kapp) 🔨 | 0 | 1 | 0 | 0 | 2 | 2 | 1 | 0 | 1 | X | 7 |
| Denmark (Stjerne) | 0 | 0 | 0 | 2 | 0 | 0 | 0 | 1 | 0 | X | 3 |

=== Draw 16 ===
Thursday, April 7, 1:30pm

| Sheet A | 1 | 2 | 3 | 4 | 5 | 6 | 7 | 8 | 9 | 10 | Final |
|---|---|---|---|---|---|---|---|---|---|---|---|
| Czech Republic (Snítil) | 2 | 1 | 0 | 1 | 0 | 3 | 0 | 0 | 0 | 2 | 9 |
| Germany (Kapp) 🔨 | 0 | 0 | 1 | 0 | 2 | 0 | 4 | 0 | 1 | 0 | 8 |

| Sheet B | 1 | 2 | 3 | 4 | 5 | 6 | 7 | 8 | 9 | 10 | Final |
|---|---|---|---|---|---|---|---|---|---|---|---|
| Sweden (Edin) 🔨 | 0 | 0 | 2 | 0 | 2 | 1 | 1 | 0 | 0 | 1 | 7 |
| Switzerland (Schwaller) | 0 | 0 | 0 | 1 | 0 | 0 | 0 | 2 | 1 | 0 | 4 |

| Sheet C | 1 | 2 | 3 | 4 | 5 | 6 | 7 | 8 | 9 | 10 | Final |
|---|---|---|---|---|---|---|---|---|---|---|---|
| China (Chen) | 0 | 0 | 0 | 1 | 0 | 0 | 0 | 0 | 0 | X | 1 |
| Norway (Ulsrud) 🔨 | 2 | 0 | 0 | 0 | 0 | 0 | 0 | 0 | 1 | X | 3 |

| Sheet D | 1 | 2 | 3 | 4 | 5 | 6 | 7 | 8 | 9 | 10 | Final |
|---|---|---|---|---|---|---|---|---|---|---|---|
| Scotland (Brewster) | 0 | 0 | 0 | 0 | 1 | 0 | 2 | 2 | 1 | 1 | 7 |
| United States (Fenson) 🔨 | 0 | 2 | 0 | 1 | 0 | 3 | 0 | 0 | 0 | 0 | 6 |

=== Draw 17 ===
Thursday, April 7, 7:30pm

| Sheet A | 1 | 2 | 3 | 4 | 5 | 6 | 7 | 8 | 9 | 10 | Final |
|---|---|---|---|---|---|---|---|---|---|---|---|
| South Korea (Lee) 🔨 | 1 | 0 | 1 | 0 | 1 | 0 | 2 | 0 | 1 | 0 | 6 |
| Switzerland (Schwaller) | 0 | 3 | 0 | 1 | 0 | 2 | 0 | 0 | 0 | 1 | 7 |

| Sheet B | 1 | 2 | 3 | 4 | 5 | 6 | 7 | 8 | 9 | 10 | Final |
|---|---|---|---|---|---|---|---|---|---|---|---|
| Denmark (Stjerne) | 0 | 1 | 0 | 1 | 0 | 0 | 1 | 0 | 2 | 0 | 5 |
| Czech Republic (Snítil) 🔨 | 0 | 0 | 2 | 0 | 1 | 1 | 0 | 2 | 0 | 0 | 6 |

| Sheet C | 1 | 2 | 3 | 4 | 5 | 6 | 7 | 8 | 9 | 10 | Final |
|---|---|---|---|---|---|---|---|---|---|---|---|
| United States (Fenson) 🔨 | 0 | 0 | 1 | 1 | 0 | 0 | 2 | 0 | 3 | 0 | 7 |
| France (Dufour) | 1 | 1 | 0 | 0 | 2 | 1 | 0 | 2 | 0 | 2 | 9 |

| Sheet D | 1 | 2 | 3 | 4 | 5 | 6 | 7 | 8 | 9 | 10 | Final |
|---|---|---|---|---|---|---|---|---|---|---|---|
| Norway (Ulsrud) | 0 | 0 | 2 | 0 | 2 | 0 | 1 | 1 | 0 | 1 | 7 |
| Canada (Stoughton) 🔨 | 0 | 2 | 0 | 2 | 0 | 2 | 0 | 0 | 0 | 0 | 6 |

== Tiebreaker ==
Friday, April 8, 1:30pm

| Sheet C | 1 | 2 | 3 | 4 | 5 | 6 | 7 | 8 | 9 | 10 | 11 | Final |
|---|---|---|---|---|---|---|---|---|---|---|---|---|
| France (Dufour) 🔨 | 0 | 0 | 1 | 1 | 0 | 0 | 1 | 0 | 0 | 1 | 0 | 4 |
| Norway (Ulsrud) | 0 | 0 | 0 | 0 | 2 | 0 | 0 | 1 | 1 | 0 | 1 | 5 |

Player percentages
| France | | Norway | |
|---|---|---|---|
| Wilfrid Coulot | 97% | Håvard Vad Petersson | 88% |
| Lionel Roux | 80% | Christoffer Svae | 84% |
| Thomas Dufour | 78% | Torger Nergård | 85% |
| Tony Angiboust | 86% | Thomas Ulsrud | 94% |
| Total | 85% | Total | 88% |

== Playoffs ==
Page playoff system
1 | Canada | 5
2 | Scotland | 2
3 | Sweden | 2
4 | Norway | 7

Semifinal
2 | Scotland | 7
4 | Norway | 6

Gold medal game
1 | Canada | 6
2 | Scotland | 5

| Bronze medal game |
| 3 | Sweden | 7 |
| 4 | Norway | 6 |

=== 1 vs. 2 ===
Friday, April 8, 7:30pm

| Sheet C | 1 | 2 | 3 | 4 | 5 | 6 | 7 | 8 | 9 | 10 | Final |
|---|---|---|---|---|---|---|---|---|---|---|---|
| Canada (Stoughton) 🔨 | 0 | 2 | 0 | 0 | 0 | 1 | 0 | 1 | 1 | X | 5 |
| Scotland (Brewster) | 0 | 0 | 0 | 0 | 2 | 0 | 0 | 0 | 0 | X | 2 |

Player percentages
| Canada | | Scotland | |
|---|---|---|---|
| Steve Gould | 99% | Michael Goodfellow | 89% |
| Reid Carruthers | 81% | Scott Andrews | 84% |
| Jon Mead | 96% | Greg Drummond | 81% |
| Jeff Stoughton | 79% | Tom Brewster | 76% |
| Total | 89% | Total | 83% |

=== 3 vs. 4 ===
Saturday, April 9, 12:30pm

| Sheet C | 1 | 2 | 3 | 4 | 5 | 6 | 7 | 8 | 9 | 10 | Final |
|---|---|---|---|---|---|---|---|---|---|---|---|
| Sweden (Edin) | 1 | 0 | 0 | 0 | 0 | 1 | 0 | X | X | X | 2 |
| Norway (Ulsrud) 🔨 | 0 | 3 | 1 | 2 | 1 | 0 | 0 | X | X | X | 7 |

Player percentages
| Sweden | | Norway | |
|---|---|---|---|
| Viktor Kjäll | 98% | Håvard Vad Petersson | 79% |
| Fredrik Lindberg | 89% | Christoffer Svae | 93% |
| Sebastian Kraupp | 81% | Torger Nergård | 84% |
| Niklas Edin | 69% | Thomas Ulsrud | 87% |
| Total | 85% | Total | 86% |

=== Semifinal ===
Saturday, April 9, 5:00pm

| Sheet C | 1 | 2 | 3 | 4 | 5 | 6 | 7 | 8 | 9 | 10 | 11 | Final |
|---|---|---|---|---|---|---|---|---|---|---|---|---|
| Scotland (Brewster) 🔨 | 2 | 0 | 1 | 0 | 1 | 0 | 0 | 0 | 2 | 0 | 1 | 7 |
| Norway (Ulsrud) | 0 | 2 | 0 | 1 | 0 | 2 | 0 | 0 | 0 | 1 | 0 | 6 |

Player percentages
| Scotland | | Norway | |
|---|---|---|---|
| Michael Goodfellow | 90% | Håvard Vad Petersson | 94% |
| Scott Andrews | 84% | Christoffer Svae | 79% |
| Greg Drummond | 90% | Torger Nergård | 77% |
| Tom Brewster | 87% | Thomas Ulsrud | 87% |
| Total | 88% | Total | 84% |

=== Bronze medal game ===
Sunday, April 10, 12:00pm

| Sheet C | 1 | 2 | 3 | 4 | 5 | 6 | 7 | 8 | 9 | 10 | Final |
|---|---|---|---|---|---|---|---|---|---|---|---|
| Sweden (Edin) | 0 | 2 | 1 | 0 | 0 | 1 | 0 | 2 | 0 | 1 | 7 |
| Norway (Ulsrud) 🔨 | 1 | 0 | 0 | 2 | 0 | 0 | 1 | 0 | 2 | 0 | 6 |

Player percentages
| Sweden | | Norway | |
|---|---|---|---|
| Viktor Kjäll | 93% | Håvard Vad Petersson | 89% |
| Fredrik Lindberg | 84% | Christoffer Svae | 86% |
| Sebastian Kraupp | 89% | Torger Nergård | 75% |
| Niklas Edin | 84% | Thomas Ulsrud | 75% |
| Total | 87% | Total | 81% |

=== Gold medal game ===
Sunday, April 10, 5:00pm

| Sheet C | 1 | 2 | 3 | 4 | 5 | 6 | 7 | 8 | 9 | 10 | Final |
|---|---|---|---|---|---|---|---|---|---|---|---|
| Canada (Stoughton) 🔨 | 1 | 0 | 0 | 0 | 3 | 0 | 0 | 2 | 0 | X | 6 |
| Scotland (Brewster) | 0 | 0 | 2 | 1 | 0 | 1 | 0 | 0 | 1 | X | 5 |

Player percentages
| Canada | | Scotland | |
|---|---|---|---|
| Steve Gould | 86% | Michael Goodfellow | 84% |
| Reid Carruthers | 88% | Scott Andrews | 78% |
| Jon Mead | 91% | Greg Drummond | 76% |
| Jeff Stoughton | 93% | Tom Brewster | 80% |
| Total | 89% | Total | 79% |

2011 Ford World Men's Curling Championship Winners
(Canada)
Canada
33rd title

== Top five player percentages ==
| Leads | % |
|---|---|
| (Sweden) Viktor Kjäll | 93 |
| (Canada) Steve Gould | 92 |
| (Norway) Håvard Vad Petersson | 87 |
| (Switzerland) Urs Eichhorn | 87 |
| (Scotland) Michael Goodfellow | 86 |

| Seconds | % |
|---|---|
| (Canada) Reid Carruthers | 88 |
| (Sweden) Fredrik Lindberg | 86 |
| (Norway) Christoffer Svae | 84 |
| (France) Lionel Roux | 83 |
| (Switzerland) Robert Hürlimann | 82 |

| Thirds | % |
|---|---|
| (Sweden) Sebastian Kraupp | 87 |
| (Canada) Jon Mead | 87 |
| (France) Thomas Dufour (Skip) | 83 |
| (Scotland) Greg Drummond | 83 |
| (Switzerland) Marco Ramstein | 82 |

| Skips | % |
|---|---|
| (Canada) Jeff Stoughton | 87 |
| (Norway) Thomas Ulsrud | 86 |
| (Sweden) Niklas Edin | 83 |
| (Switzerland) Christof Schwaller | 82 |
| (France) Tony Angiboust (Fourth) | 80 |
