= 2016 World Men's Curling Championship =

- Host city: Basel, Switzerland
- Arena: St. Jakobshalle
- Dates: April 2–10, 2016
- Winner: Canada
- Curling club: The Glencoe Club, Calgary
- Skip: Kevin Koe
- Third: Marc Kennedy
- Second: Brent Laing
- Lead: Ben Hebert
- Alternate: Scott Pfeifer
- Coach: John Dunn
- Finalist: Denmark (Rasmus Stjerne)

The 2016 World Men's Curling Championship was held from April 2 to 10 at St. Jakobshalle in Basel, Switzerland.

Canada, skipped by Kevin Koe, won its first World Men's Championship in four years defeating the Rasmus Stjerne rink from Denmark in the final, 5–3. The ninth end marked the turning point in the game after Stjerne just missed a double runback raise, leaving Koe with an open draw for two. In the 10th end, Canada third Marc Kennedy made a runback double takeout that dashed any chance for the Danes to come back. Stjerne froze his last rock of the game, but Koe was able to pick it out for the win. It was the first time Denmark had made it to the World Men's finals. The U.S. (John Shuster) won the bronze medal, beating Japan (Yusuke Morozumi) 8–6 in the third place game.

The World Championships were held in the infamous "Broomgate" season, with both finalist teams being seen as taking advantage of the ambiguous and lenient rules around brush heads at the time. Denmark making the final was especially noteworthy, as they had finished in last place in 2014, and did not even qualify for the 2015 World Championship.

== Qualification ==
The following nations are qualified to participate in the 2016 World Men's Curling Championship:

- Switzerland (host country)
- Two teams from the Americas zone
  - Canada
  - United States (given that no challenges in the Americas zone are issued)
- Seven teams from the 2015 European Curling Championships
  - Norway
  - Finland
  - Sweden
  - Scotland
  - Germany
  - Russia
  - Denmark
- Two teams from the 2015 Pacific-Asia Curling Championships
  - Japan
  - South Korea

== Teams ==
Canada	Denmark	Finland
The Glencoe Club, Calgary Skip: Kevin Koe; Third: Marc Kennedy; Second: Brent Laing; Lead: Ben Hebert; Alternate: Scott Pfeifer	Hvidovre CC, Hvidovre Skip: Rasmus Stjerne; Third: Johnny Frederiksen; Second: Mikkel Poulsen; Lead: Troels Harry; Alternate: Oliver Dupont	Kisakallio CC, Lohja Skip: Aku Kauste; Third: Kasper Hakunti; Second: Pauli Jäämies; Lead: Janne Pitko; Alternate: Kalle Kiiskinen
Germany	Norway	Japan
Baden Hills G&CC, Rheinmünster Skip: Alexander Baumann; Third: Manuel Walter; Second: Marc Muskatewitz; Lead: Sebastian Schweizer; Alternate: Daniel Rothballer	Snarøen CC, Oslo Skip: Thomas Ulsrud; Third: Torger Nergård; Second: Christoffer Svae; Lead: Håvard Vad Petersson; Alternate: Markus Snøve Høiberg	Karuizawa CC, Karuizawa Skip: Yusuke Morozumi; Third: Tetsuro Shimizu; Second: Tsuyoshi Yamaguchi; Lead: Kosuke Morozumi; Alternate: Yasumasa Tanida
Russia	Scotland	South Korea
Adamant CC, Saint Petersburg Skip: Alexey Tselousov; Third: Artyom Shmakov; Second: Roman Kutuzov; Lead: Alexey Timofeev; Alternate: Aleksandr Kozyrev	Curl Aberdeen, Aberdeen Skip: Tom Brewster; Third: Glen Muirhead; Second: Ross Paterson; Lead: Hammy McMillan Jr. Alternate: Scott Andrews	Gangwon Curling, Gangwon Province Skip: Kim Soo-hyuk; Third: Kim Tae-hwan; Second: Park Jong-duk; Lead: Nam Yoon-ho; Alternate: Yoo Min-hyeon
Sweden	Switzerland	United States
Karlstads CK, Karlstad Skip: Niklas Edin; Third: Oskar Eriksson; Second: Kristian Lindström; Lead: Christoffer Sundgren; Alternate: Henrik Leek	CC Adelboden, Adelboden Skip: Sven Michel; Third: Marc Pfister; Second: Enrico Pfister; Lead: Simon Gempeler; Alternate: Raphael Märki	Duluth CC, Duluth Skip: John Shuster; Third: Tyler George; Second: Matt Hamilton; Lead: John Landsteiner; Alternate: Kroy Nernberger

== Round-robin standings ==
Final round-robin standings

Key
Teams to Playoffs

Locale	Skip	W	L	PF	PA	Ends Won	Ends Lost	Blank Ends	Stolen Ends	Shot Pct.
Canada	Kevin Koe	10	1	81	42	47	29	23	12	88%
Denmark	Rasmus Stjerne	8	3	82	56	50	36	15	13	84%
Japan	Yusuke Morozumi	8	3	69	59	40	39	18	8	85%
United States	John Shuster	8	3	81	67	47	44	11	9	83%
Norway	Thomas Ulsrud	7	4	70	56	42	41	16	8	85%
Sweden	Niklas Edin	6	5	64	60	44	40	19	9	86%
Scotland	Tom Brewster	5	6	66	60	39	36	33	7	86%
Finland	Aku Kauste	5	6	67	64	46	38	11	11	82%
Switzerland	Sven Michel	4	7	67	74	39	45	17	6	81%
Russia	Alexey Tselousov	2	9	43	83	31	46	16	4	78%
South Korea	Kim Soo-hyuk	2	9	57	86	36	52	12	3	79%
Germany	Alexander Baumann	1	10	40	80	29	44	19	3	77%

== Round-robin results ==
All draw times are listed in Central European Summer Time (UTC+2).

=== Draw 1 ===
Saturday, April 2, 14:00

Sheet A	1	2	3	4	5	6	7	8	9	10	Final
Sweden (Edin)	1	0	2	0	1	0	2	0	0	2	8
Japan (Morozumi) 🔨	0	1	0	2	0	0	0	2	0	0	5

Sheet B	1	2	3	4	5	6	7	8	9	10	Final
South Korea (Kim)	0	0	1	0	0	0	2	0	X	X	3
Scotland (Brewster) 🔨	0	2	0	0	2	3	0	2	X	X	9

Sheet C	1	2	3	4	5	6	7	8	9	10	Final
Norway (Ulsrud) 🔨	2	0	0	2	0	0	4	3	X	X	11
Russia (Tselousov)	0	2	0	0	1	0	0	0	X	X	3

Sheet D	1	2	3	4	5	6	7	8	9	10	Final
Germany (Baumann) 🔨	0	0	1	0	1	0	0	0	X	X	2
Switzerland (Michel)	1	1	0	3	0	2	0	1	X	X	8

=== Draw 2 ===
Saturday, April 2, 19:00

Sheet A	1	2	3	4	5	6	7	8	9	10	11	Final
Russia (Tselousov)	0	3	0	0	2	0	1	0	0	2	1	9
South Korea (Kim) 🔨	2	0	1	1	0	2	0	0	2	0	0	8

Sheet B	1	2	3	4	5	6	7	8	9	10	Final
United States (Shuster)	0	0	0	0	1	0	0	0	X	X	1
Denmark (Stjerne) 🔨	2	0	1	0	0	1	1	2	X	X	7

Sheet C	1	2	3	4	5	6	7	8	9	10	Final
Canada (Koe) 🔨	1	0	1	0	1	1	0	0	3	X	7
Finland (Kauste)	0	1	0	1	0	0	0	1	0	X	3

Sheet D	1	2	3	4	5	6	7	8	9	10	Final
Norway (Ulsrud) 🔨	0	2	0	0	0	0	0	0	1	0	3
Scotland (Brewster)	1	0	2	0	0	0	1	1	0	1	6

=== Draw 3 ===
Sunday, April 3, 9:00

Sheet B	1	2	3	4	5	6	7	8	9	10	Final
Switzerland (Michel) 🔨	2	0	0	1	0	0	0	2	0	X	5
Sweden (Edin)	0	1	1	0	2	2	0	0	3	X	9

Sheet C	1	2	3	4	5	6	7	8	9	10	Final
Germany (Baumann) 🔨	1	0	0	0	0	1	0	1	X	X	3
Japan (Morozumi)	0	3	0	1	3	0	1	0	X	X	8

=== Draw 4 ===
Sunday, April 3, 14:00

Sheet A	1	2	3	4	5	6	7	8	9	10	11	Final
Denmark (Stjerne) 🔨	0	3	0	1	1	0	0	2	0	1	0	8
Canada (Koe)	1	0	1	0	0	2	2	0	2	0	3	11

Sheet B	1	2	3	4	5	6	7	8	9	10	Final
Scotland (Brewster)	0	0	1	0	1	0	1	0	3	X	6
Russia (Tselousov) 🔨	0	1	0	4	0	3	0	1	0	X	9

Sheet C	1	2	3	4	5	6	7	8	9	10	Final
South Korea (Kim) 🔨	2	0	2	0	1	0	1	0	0	0	6
Norway (Ulsrud)	0	4	0	1	0	1	0	2	0	1	9

Sheet D	1	2	3	4	5	6	7	8	9	10	Final
United States (Shuster)	0	2	0	1	0	2	0	0	0	2	7
Finland (Kauste) 🔨	1	0	1	0	2	0	1	0	0	0	5

=== Draw 5 ===
Sunday, April 3, 19:00

Sheet A	1	2	3	4	5	6	7	8	9	10	Final
Japan (Morozumi) 🔨	1	0	2	0	4	0	0	2	0	X	9
Switzerland (Michel)	0	2	0	2	0	1	0	0	1	X	6

Sheet B	1	2	3	4	5	6	7	8	9	10	11	Final
Canada (Koe) 🔨	2	0	1	0	0	2	0	2	0	2	1	10
United States (Shuster)	0	2	0	0	2	0	2	0	3	0	0	9

Sheet C	1	2	3	4	5	6	7	8	9	10	Final
Finland (Kauste)	0	0	0	1	0	1	0	X	X	X	2
Denmark (Stjerne) 🔨	0	2	1	0	3	0	3	X	X	X	9

Sheet D	1	2	3	4	5	6	7	8	9	10	Final
Sweden (Edin) 🔨	0	2	0	1	2	0	1	0	2	0	8
Germany (Baumann)	0	0	1	0	0	1	0	2	0	0	4

=== Draw 6 ===
Monday, April 4, 9:00

Sheet A	1	2	3	4	5	6	7	8	9	10	Final
Germany (Baumann) 🔨	1	0	1	0	0	0	X	X	X	X	2
Norway (Ulsrud)	0	2	0	2	1	3	X	X	X	X	8

Sheet B	1	2	3	4	5	6	7	8	9	10	Final
Switzerland (Michel) 🔨	3	0	3	0	4	2	X	X	X	X	12
South Korea (Kim)	0	2	0	2	0	0	X	X	X	X	4

Sheet C	1	2	3	4	5	6	7	8	9	10	11	Final
Sweden (Edin) 🔨	0	0	0	0	0	1	0	1	1	0	1	4
Russia (Tselousov)	0	0	0	1	0	0	1	0	0	1	0	3

Sheet D	1	2	3	4	5	6	7	8	9	10	Final
Japan (Morozumi)	0	0	1	0	2	0	0	0	2	1	6
Scotland (Brewster) 🔨	0	1	0	0	0	0	4	0	0	0	5

=== Draw 7 ===
Monday, April 4, 14:00

Sheet A	1	2	3	4	5	6	7	8	9	10	Final
South Korea (Kim)	0	2	0	1	0	0	0	0	1	0	4
Finland (Kauste) 🔨	1	0	1	0	1	0	1	1	0	1	6

Sheet B	1	2	3	4	5	6	7	8	9	10	Final
Norway (Ulsrud) 🔨	2	0	0	1	0	1	0	3	0	1	8
Denmark (Stjerne)	0	1	0	0	1	0	2	0	2	0	6

Sheet C	1	2	3	4	5	6	7	8	9	10	Final
Scotland (Brewster)	0	0	2	0	1	0	0	0	0	X	3
Canada (Koe) 🔨	0	2	0	1	0	0	0	0	2	X	5

Sheet D	1	2	3	4	5	6	7	8	9	10	Final
Russia (Tselousov)	0	2	0	1	1	0	2	0	0	X	6
United States (Shuster) 🔨	2	0	2	0	0	2	0	1	2	X	9

=== Draw 8 ===
Monday, April 4, 19:00

Sheet A	1	2	3	4	5	6	7	8	9	10	Final
United States (Shuster)	0	3	0	4	0	1	X	X	X	X	8
Sweden (Edin) 🔨	1	0	1	0	1	0	X	X	X	X	3

Sheet B	1	2	3	4	5	6	7	8	9	10	Final
Canada (Koe) 🔨	0	1	2	5	1	0	X	X	X	X	9
Japan (Morozumi)	0	0	0	0	0	2	X	X	X	X	2

Sheet C	1	2	3	4	5	6	7	8	9	10	Final
Denmark (Stjerne) 🔨	2	2	0	0	0	3	2	X	X	X	9
Germany (Baumann)	0	0	1	0	0	0	0	X	X	X	1

Sheet D	1	2	3	4	5	6	7	8	9	10	Final
Finland (Kauste) 🔨	1	0	2	0	1	0	2	1	1	4	12
Switzerland (Michel)	0	2	0	3	0	1	0	0	0	0	6

=== Draw 9 ===
Tuesday, April 5, 9:00

Sheet A	1	2	3	4	5	6	7	8	9	10	Final
Denmark (Stjerne) 🔨	1	0	1	0	1	0	2	1	0	1	7
Japan (Morozumi)	0	1	0	2	0	2	0	0	0	0	5

Sheet B	1	2	3	4	5	6	7	8	9	10	Final
Finland (Kauste) 🔨	1	0	1	1	0	3	0	1	1	X	8
Sweden (Edin)	0	2	0	0	1	0	3	0	0	X	6

Sheet C	1	2	3	4	5	6	7	8	9	10	Final
United States (Shuster) 🔨	2	0	0	2	0	2	0	2	1	X	9
Switzerland (Michel)	0	2	2	0	1	0	2	0	0	X	7

Sheet D	1	2	3	4	5	6	7	8	9	10	Final
Canada (Koe) 🔨	0	0	3	0	0	2	0	0	1	X	6
Germany (Baumann)	0	0	0	2	0	0	0	1	0	X	3

=== Draw 10 ===
Tuesday, April 5, 14:00

Sheet A	1	2	3	4	5	6	7	8	9	10	11	Final
Switzerland (Michel) 🔨	0	0	0	0	2	0	0	2	0	0	1	5
Scotland (Brewster)	0	0	0	1	0	2	0	0	0	1	0	4

Sheet B	1	2	3	4	5	6	7	8	9	10	Final
Germany (Baumann)	0	1	1	0	1	1	0	3	X	X	7
Russia (Tselousov) 🔨	0	0	0	1	0	0	1	0	X	X	2

Sheet C	1	2	3	4	5	6	7	8	9	10	Final
Japan (Morozumi) 🔨	0	0	1	0	2	0	1	0	2	X	6
South Korea (Kim)	0	0	0	1	0	0	0	2	0	X	3

Sheet D	1	2	3	4	5	6	7	8	9	10	Final
Sweden (Edin)	1	0	0	2	0	1	0	0	0	X	4
Norway (Ulsrud) 🔨	0	0	2	0	1	0	1	1	1	X	6

=== Draw 11 ===
Tuesday, April 5, 19:00

Sheet A	1	2	3	4	5	6	7	8	9	10	Final
Russia (Tselousov)	0	1	0	0	0	0	1	0	X	X	2
Canada (Koe) 🔨	2	0	1	1	0	0	0	3	X	X	7

Sheet B	1	2	3	4	5	6	7	8	9	10	11	Final
Scotland (Brewster)	0	2	0	0	2	0	0	1	0	2	0	7
United States (Shuster) 🔨	2	0	2	0	0	0	1	0	2	0	2	9

Sheet C	1	2	3	4	5	6	7	8	9	10	Final
Norway (Ulsrud)	0	2	0	1	0	0	3	0	1	X	7
Finland (Kauste) 🔨	1	0	1	0	0	1	0	2	0	X	5

Sheet D	1	2	3	4	5	6	7	8	9	10	Final
South Korea (Kim) 🔨	1	0	0	2	0	1	0	0	2	2	8
Denmark (Stjerne)	0	1	1	0	1	0	0	2	0	0	5

=== Draw 12 ===
Wednesday, April 6, 9:00

Sheet A	1	2	3	4	5	6	7	8	9	10	Final
Norway (Ulsrud)	0	0	0	0	1	2	0	0	X	X	3
United States (Shuster) 🔨	1	2	1	1	0	0	2	1	X	X	8

Sheet B	1	2	3	4	5	6	7	8	9	10	Final
South Korea (Kim) 🔨	0	1	0	0	0	1	0	X	X	X	2
Canada (Koe)	1	0	3	1	1	0	3	X	X	X	9

Sheet C	1	2	3	4	5	6	7	8	9	10	Final
Russia (Tselousov)	0	0	1	0	0	0	X	X	X	X	1
Denmark (Stjerne) 🔨	0	3	0	2	0	4	X	X	X	X	9

Sheet D	1	2	3	4	5	6	7	8	9	10	Final
Scotland (Brewster) 🔨	0	1	0	2	1	0	0	3	X	X	7
Finland (Kauste)	0	0	2	0	0	0	1	0	X	X	3

=== Draw 13 ===
Wednesday, April 6, 14:00

Sheet A	1	2	3	4	5	6	7	8	9	10	Final
Finland (Kauste)	1	1	0	3	0	4	X	X	X	X	9
Germany (Baumann) 🔨	0	0	0	0	1	0	X	X	X	X	1

Sheet B	1	2	3	4	5	6	7	8	9	10	11	Final
Denmark (Stjerne)	0	1	0	1	0	0	2	0	2	0	1	7
Switzerland (Michel) 🔨	0	0	1	0	0	1	0	2	0	2	0	6

Sheet C	1	2	3	4	5	6	7	8	9	10	11	Final
Canada (Koe) 🔨	0	0	0	0	0	1	0	1	0	1	0	3
Sweden (Edin)	0	0	0	0	0	0	1	0	2	0	1	4

Sheet D	1	2	3	4	5	6	7	8	9	10	Final
United States (Shuster)	0	0	2	0	1	0	2	0	2	0	7
Japan (Morozumi) 🔨	0	1	0	2	0	2	0	2	0	1	8

=== Draw 14 ===
Wednesday, April 6, 19:00

Sheet A	1	2	3	4	5	6	7	8	9	10	Final
Sweden (Edin) 🔨	2	2	0	1	0	1	0	0	1	X	7
South Korea (Kim)	0	0	1	0	2	0	0	1	0	X	4

Sheet B	1	2	3	4	5	6	7	8	9	10	Final
Japan (Morozumi)	0	0	1	0	0	0	2	1	0	2	6
Norway (Ulsrud) 🔨	1	0	0	0	0	1	0	0	2	0	4

Sheet C	1	2	3	4	5	6	7	8	9	10	11	Final
Germany (Baumann)	0	0	3	0	0	0	0	2	0	1	0	6
Scotland (Brewster) 🔨	2	1	0	0	0	1	0	0	2	0	1	7

Sheet D	1	2	3	4	5	6	7	8	9	10	Final
Switzerland (Michel) 🔨	0	1	0	2	2	0	1	0	0	X	6
Russia (Tselousov)	0	0	1	0	0	1	0	1	0	X	3

=== Draw 15 ===
Thursday, April 7, 9:00

Sheet A	1	2	3	4	5	6	7	8	9	10	11	Final
Scotland (Brewster)	0	0	3	0	0	1	0	0	2	0	0	6
Denmark (Stjerne) 🔨	0	1	0	0	2	0	2	0	0	1	1	7

Sheet B	1	2	3	4	5	6	7	8	9	10	Final
Russia (Tselousov)	0	1	1	0	1	0	0	0	X	X	3
Finland (Kauste) 🔨	2	0	0	3	0	0	2	2	X	X	9

Sheet C	1	2	3	4	5	6	7	8	9	10	Final
South Korea (Kim)	0	2	0	2	1	0	1	0	0	0	6
United States (Shuster) 🔨	2	0	1	0	0	2	0	1	1	1	8

Sheet D	1	2	3	4	5	6	7	8	9	10	Final
Norway (Ulsrud)	0	2	0	1	0	0	0	1	0	X	4
Canada (Koe) 🔨	1	0	2	0	0	0	2	0	1	X	6

=== Draw 16 ===
Thursday, April 7, 14:00

Sheet A	1	2	3	4	5	6	7	8	9	10	Final
Japan (Morozumi)	1	0	2	2	0	2	X	X	X	X	7
Russia (Tselousov) 🔨	0	1	0	0	1	0	X	X	X	X	2

Sheet B	1	2	3	4	5	6	7	8	9	10	Final
Sweden (Edin)	0	1	0	2	0	0	1	0	0	0	4
Scotland (Brewster) 🔨	0	0	1	0	2	0	0	0	0	3	6

Sheet C	1	2	3	4	5	6	7	8	9	10	Final
Switzerland (Michel)	0	0	2	0	0	1	0	0	1	0	4
Norway (Ulsrud) 🔨	0	1	0	2	2	0	0	1	0	1	7

Sheet D	1	2	3	4	5	6	7	8	9	10	Final
Germany (Baumann) 🔨	2	0	0	1	0	1	0	0	2	0	6
South Korea (Kim)	0	0	2	0	4	0	0	2	0	1	9

=== Draw 17 ===
Thursday, April 7, 19:00

Sheet A	1	2	3	4	5	6	7	8	9	10	Final
Canada (Koe) 🔨	0	2	0	1	0	0	2	0	3	X	8
Switzerland (Michel)	0	0	0	0	0	1	0	1	0	X	2

Sheet B	1	2	3	4	5	6	7	8	9	10	Final
United States (Shuster)	0	0	0	2	0	1	0	1	0	2	6
Germany (Baumann) 🔨	2	0	0	0	0	0	2	0	1	0	5

Sheet C	1	2	3	4	5	6	7	8	9	10	Final
Finland (Kauste) 🔨	0	1	0	1	0	1	0	2	0	X	5
Japan (Morozumi)	0	0	1	0	3	0	2	0	1	X	7

Sheet D	1	2	3	4	5	6	7	8	9	10	Final
Denmark (Stjerne)	0	2	0	2	0	1	0	1	0	2	8
Sweden (Edin) 🔨	1	0	2	0	2	0	1	0	1	0	7

== Playoffs ==
Page playoff system
1	Canada	5
2	Denmark	3
3	Japan	4
4	United States	5

Semifinal
2	Denmark	9
4	United States	3

Final
1	Canada	5
2	Denmark	3

Bronze medal game
3	Japan	6
4	United States	8

=== 1 vs. 2 ===
Friday, April 8, 19:00

Team	1	2	3	4	5	6	7	8	9	10	Final
Canada (Koe) 🔨	1	0	1	0	0	0	3	0	0	X	5
Denmark (Stjerne)	0	1	0	0	1	0	0	0	1	X	3

Player percentages
Canada		Denmark	
Ben Hebert	90%	Troels Harry	91%
Brent Laing	94%	Mikkel Poulsen	83%
Marc Kennedy	90%	Johnny Frederiksen	78%
Kevin Koe	83%	Rasmus Stjerne	75%
Total	89%	Total	82%

=== 3 vs. 4 ===
Saturday, April 9, 14:00

Team	1	2	3	4	5	6	7	8	9	10	Final
Japan (Morozumi) 🔨	0	1	1	0	0	1	0	0	1	0	4
United States (Shuster)	1	0	0	0	0	0	0	3	0	1	5

Player percentages
Japan		United States	
Kosuke Morozumi	84%	John Landsteiner	83%
Tsuyoshi Yamaguchi	94%	Matt Hamilton	85%
Tetsuro Shimizu	80%	Tyler George	80%
Yusuke Morozumi	69%	John Shuster	78%
Total	82%	Total	81%

=== Semifinal ===
Saturday, April 9, 19:00

Team	1	2	3	4	5	6	7	8	9	10	Final
Denmark (Stjerne) 🔨	2	0	3	0	3	0	0	1	X	X	9
United States (Shuster)	0	0	0	2	0	0	1	0	X	X	3

Player percentages
Denmark		United States	
Troels Harry	85%	John Landsteiner	85%
Mikkel Poulsen	88%	Matt Hamilton	80%
Johnny Frederiksen	94%	Tyler George	81%
Rasmus Stjerne	81%	John Shuster	70%
Total	87%	Total	79%

=== Bronze medal game ===
Sunday, April 10, 10:00

Team	1	2	3	4	5	6	7	8	9	10	Final
Japan (Morozumi)	0	0	2	0	2	0	2	0	0	0	6
United States (Shuster) 🔨	3	1	0	1	0	1	0	1	0	1	8

Player percentages
Japan		United States	
Kosuke Morozumi	90%	John Landsteiner	73%
Tsuyoshi Yamaguchi	90%	Matt Hamilton	89%
Tetsuro Shimizu	91%	Tyler George	90%
Yusuke Morozumi	68%	John Shuster	84%
Total	85%	Total	84%

=== Final ===
Sunday, April 10, 15:00

Team	1	2	3	4	5	6	7	8	9	10	Final
Canada (Koe) 🔨	1	0	0	0	2	0	0	0	2	X	5
Denmark (Stjerne)	0	0	2	0	0	1	0	0	0	X	3

Player percentages
Canada		Denmark	
Ben Hebert	95%	Troels Harry	93%
Brent Laing	91%	Mikkel Poulsen	89%
Marc Kennedy	91%	Johnny Frederiksen	79%
Kevin Koe	91%	Rasmus Stjerne	88%
Total	92%	Total	87%

2016 World Men's Curling Championship winner
(Canada)
Canada
35th title

== Statistics ==
=== Top 5 player percentages ===
Round robin only

Leads	%
(Sweden) Christoffer Sundgren	89
(Scotland) Hammy McMillan Jr.	88
(Norway) Håvard Vad Petersson	88
(Switzerland) Simon Gempeler	87
(Denmark) Troels Harry	86

Seconds	%
(Canada) Brent Laing	88
(Scotland) Ross Paterson	87
(Sweden) Kristian Lindström	86
(Japan) Tsuyoshi Yamaguchi	86
(United States) Matt Hamilton	84

Thirds	%
(Canada) Marc Kennedy	88
(Norway) Torger Nergård	88
(Sweden) Oskar Eriksson	86
(Denmark) Johnny Frederiksen	85
(Japan) Tetsuro Shimizu	85

Skips	%
(Canada) Kevin Koe	90
(Denmark) Rasmus Stjerne	87
(Scotland) Tom Brewster	85
(Norway) Thomas Ulsrud	84
(Japan) Yusuke Morozumi	84
