= Yusuke Morozumi =

Japanese curler

- Curler
- Born: January 16, 1985 (age 41); Karuizawa, Nagano

Team
- Curling club: Karuizawa CC, Karuizawa, JPN
- Skip: Yusuke Morozumi
- Third: Yuta Matsumura
- Second: Ryotaro Shukuya
- Lead: Masaki Iwai
- Alternate: Kosuke Morozumi

Curling career
- Member Association: Japan
- World Championship: 6 (2009, 2013, 2014, 2015, 2016, 2017)
- Pacific-Asia Championship: 10 (2007, 2008, 2009, 2012, 2013, 2014, 2015, 2016, 2017, 2021)
- Olympic: 1 (2018)
Medal record
Men's curling
Representing Japan
Asian Winter Games
Silver medal – second place	2017 Sapporo
Pacific-Asia Championships
Gold medal – first place	2016 Uiseong
Silver medal – second place	2008 Naseby
Silver medal – second place	2009 Karuizawa
Silver medal – second place	2012 Naseby
Silver medal – second place	2013 Shanghai
Silver medal – second place	2014 Karuizawa
Silver medal – second place	2015 Almaty
Silver medal – second place	2021 Almaty
Bronze medal – third place	2017 Erina
Pacific-Asia Junior Championships
Silver medal – second place	2006 Beijing

Yusuke Morozumi (両角 友佑, Morozumi Yusuke; born January 16, 1985 in Nagano) is a Japanese curler from Karuizawa. He skipped the Japanese men's team at the 2018 Winter Olympics. He currently coaches the Chubu Electric Power Curling Team.

== Curling career ==
Yusuke Morozumi was the skip of the Japanese team at the 2004 World Junior Curling Championships, placing 9th.

In 2008, by finishing 2nd at the Pacific Curling Championships he and his team qualified for the 2009 World Men's Curling Championships, finishing 10th overall. Since then, he has skipped Japan at the 2013 (11th place), 2014 (5th), 2015 (6th), 2016 (4th) and 2017 (7th) World Championships. In total, he has played in 9 Pacific-Asia Curling Championships (as of 2017), with his best finish coming at the 2016 Pacific-Asia Curling Championships where he captured gold.

Morozumi skipped the Japanese team which also included Tetsuro Shimizu, Tsuyoshi Yamaguchi, Kosuke Morozumi and Kohsuke Hirata at the 2018 Winter Olympics. There, he led his team to a 4–5 record, in 8th place overall.

== Personal life ==
Morozumi is married and works as a sports instructor. He is a graduate of Kanazawa University. He has three children.

== Teams ==
Season	Skip	Third	Second	Lead	Alternate	Events
2002–03	Hiroaki Kashiwagi	Kazuto Yanagizawa	Yoichi Nakasato	Yusuke Morozumi	Keita Satoh	2003 WJCC
2003–04	Yusuke Morozumi	Masahori Satoh	Yoichi Nakasato	Keisaku Fujimaki	Kazuya Kobayashi	2004 WJCC
2005–06	Yusuke Morozumi	Tsuyoshi Yamaguchi	Masahori Satoh	Yoichi Nakasato	Kosuke Morozumi	2006 PJCC
2006–07	Yusuke Morozumi	Masonori Satoh	Yoichi Nakasato	Tsuyoshi Yamaguchi		
2006–07	Yusuke Morozumi	Tsuyoshi Yamaguchi	Masanori Satoh	Tetsuro Shimizu	Ryo Ogihara	2007 WUG
2007–08	Yusuke Morozumi	Tsuyoshi Yamaguchi	Tetsuro Shimizu	Yuta Matsumura		
2008–09	Yusuke Morozumi	Tsuyoshi Yamaguchi	Tetsuro Shimizu	Kosuke Morozumi	Keita Satoh	2008 PCC, 2009 WCC
2009–10	Yusuke Morozumi	Tsuyoshi Yamaguchi	Tetsuro Shimizu	Kosuke Morozumi	Hayato Sato	2009 PCC
2010–11	Yusuke Morozumi	Tsuyoshi Yamaguchi	Tetsuro Shimizu	Kosuke Morozumi		
2011–12	Yusuke Morozumi	Tsuyoshi Yamaguchi	Tetsuro Shimizu	Kosuke Morozumi		
2012–13	Yusuke Morozumi	Tsuyoshi Yamaguchi	Tetsuro Shimizu	Kosuke Morozumi	Yoshiro Shimizu	2012 PCC, 2013 WCC
2013–14	Yusuke Morozumi	Tsuyoshi Yamaguchi	Tetsuro Shimizu	Kosuke Morozumi	Shinya Abe	2013 PCC, OQE, 2014 WCC
2014–15	Yusuke Morozumi	Tsuyoshi Yamaguchi	Tetsuro Shimizu	Kosuke Morozumi	Yuta Matsumura	2014 PCC, 2015 WCC
2015–16	Yusuke Morozumi	Tsuyoshi Yamaguchi	Tetsuro Shimizu	Kosuke Morozumi	Kohsuke Hirata / Yasumasa Tanida	2015 PCC, 2016 WCC
2016–17	Yusuke Morozumi	Tsuyoshi Yamaguchi	Tetsuro Shimizu	Kosuke Morozumi	Kohsuke Hirata	2016 PCC, 2017 AWG, WCC
2017–18	Yusuke Morozumi	Tsuyoshi Yamaguchi	Tetsuro Shimizu	Kosuke Morozumi	Kohsuke Hirata	2017 PCC, 2018 OG
2019–20	Yusuke Morozumi	Masaki Iwai	Ryotaro Shukuya	Kosuke Morozumi		
2020–21	Yusuke Morozumi	Masaki Iwai	Ryotaro Shukuya	Kosuke Morozumi		
2021–22	Yusuke Morozumi	Masaki Iwai	Ryotaro Shukuya	Kosuke Morozumi		2021 PCC
2022–23	Yusuke Morozumi	Yuta Matsumura	Ryotaro Shukuya	Kosuke Morozumi	Masaki Iwai	
2023–24	Yusuke Morozumi	Yuta Matsumura	Ryotaro Shukuya	Masaki Iwai	Kosuke Morozumi	
2024–25	Yusuke Morozumi	Yuta Matsumura	Ryotaro Shukuya	Masaki Iwai	Kosuke Morozumi	

== Grand Slam record ==
Key
C	Champion
F	Lost in Final
SF	Lost in Semifinal
QF	Lost in Quarterfinals
R16	Lost in the round of 16
Q	Did not advance to playoffs
T2	Played in Tier 2 event
DNP	Did not participate in event
N/A	Not a Grand Slam event that season

Event	2013–14	2014–15	2015–16	2016–17	2017–18	2018–19	2019–20	2020–21	2021–22	2022–23	2023–24	2024–25
Tour Challenge	N/A	N/A	DNP	DNP	DNP	DNP	DNP	N/A	N/A	DNP	T2	T2
The National	Q	DNP	DNP	DNP	DNP	DNP	DNP	N/A	DNP	DNP	DNP	DNP
Champions Cup	N/A	N/A	DNP	Q	DNP	DNP	N/A	DNP	DNP	DNP	N/A	N/A
