= Kosuke Morozumi =

Japanese curler

- Curler
- Born: 27 July 1988 (age 38); Karuizawa, Nagano

Team
- Skip: Yusuke Morozumi
- Third: Yuta Matsumura
- Second: Ryotaro Shukuya
- Lead: Masaki Iwai
- Alternate: Kosuke Morozumi

Curling career
- Member Association: Japan
- World Championship: 6 (2009, 2013, 2014, 2015, 2016, 2017)
- Pacific-Asia Championship: 10 (2007, 2008, 2009, 2012, 2013, 2014, 2015, 2016, 2017, 2021)
- Olympic: 1 (2018)
Medal record
Men's curling
Representing Japan
Pacific-Asia Championships
Gold medal – first place	2016 Uiseong
Silver medal – second place	2015 Almaty
Silver medal – second place	2014 Karuizawa
Silver medal – second place	2013 Shanghai
Silver medal – second place	2012 Naseby
Silver medal – second place	2009 Karuizawa
Silver medal – second place	2008 Naseby
Silver medal – second place	2021 Almaty
Bronze medal – third place	2017 Erina

Kosuke Morozumi (両角 公佑, Morozumi Kōsuke; born 27 July 1988) is a Japanese curler from Karuizawa, Nagano. He competed at the 2015 Ford World Men's Curling Championship in Halifax, Nova Scotia, Canada, as lead for the Japanese team, which placed sixth in the tournament.

== Personal life ==
Morozumi is employed as sales clerk for a leisure store.
