= Kim Soo-hyuk =

South Korean curler (born 1984)

- Curler
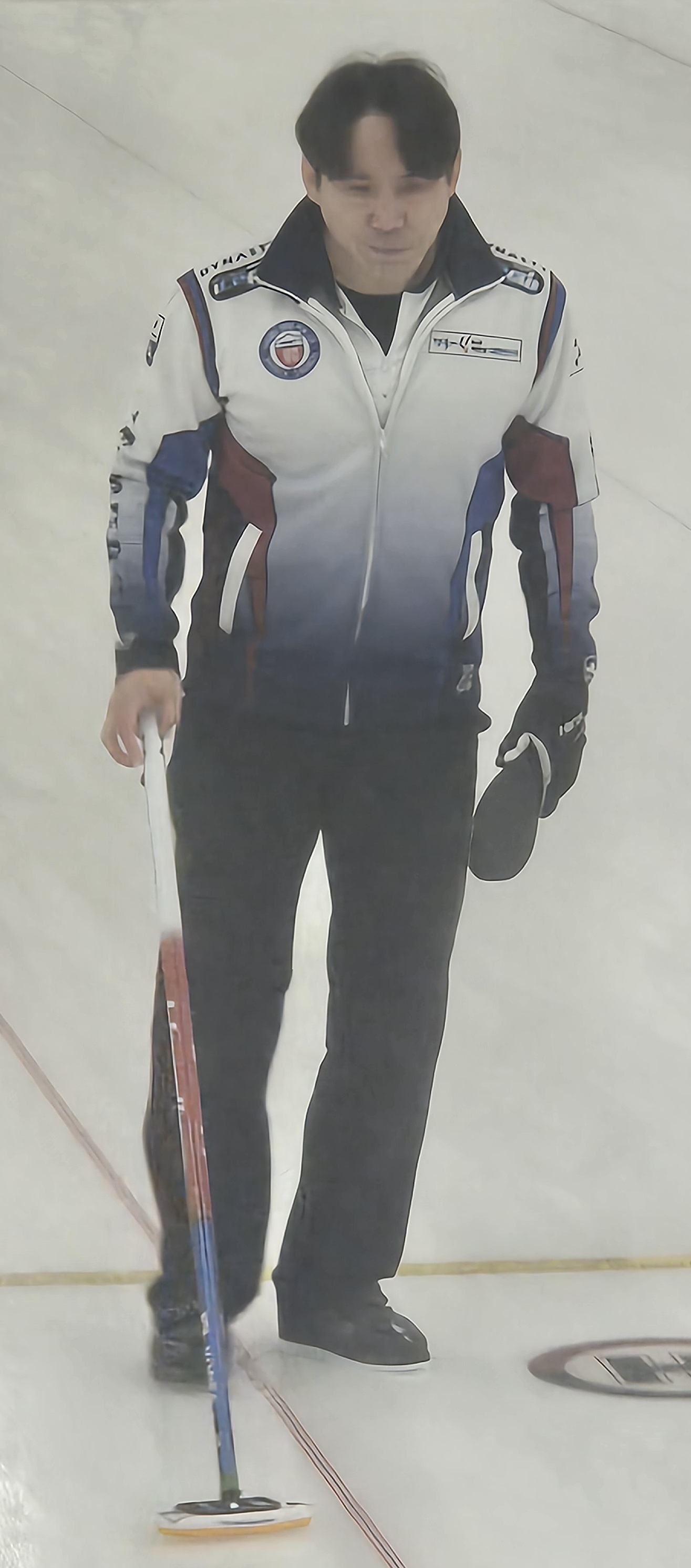
- Kim at the 2025 Capital Curling Fall Open
- Born: May 5, 1984 (age 42); Uiseong, South Korea

Team
- Curling club: Uiseong CC, Uiseong, KOR
- Skip: Kim Soo-hyuk
- Third: Kim Chang-min
- Second: Yoo Min-hyeon
- Lead: Kim Hak-kyun
- Alternate: Jeon Jae-ik
- Mixed doubles partner: Yang Tae-i

Curling career
- Member Association: South Korea
- World Championship: 6 (2003, 2011, 2016, 2019, 2022, 2026)
- Pacific-Asia Championship: 10 (2001, 2002, 2008, 2010, 2013, 2014, 2015, 2016, 2018, 2021)
- Pan Continental Championship: 1 (2025)
Medal record
Men's curling
Representing South Korea
Pacific-Asia Championships
Gold medal – first place	2002 Queenstown
Gold medal – first place	2015 Almaty
Gold medal – first place	2021 Almaty
Silver medal – second place	2010 Uiseong
Bronze medal – third place	2013 Shanghai
Bronze medal – third place	2014 Karuizawa
Bronze medal – third place	2016 Uiseong
Bronze medal – third place	2018 Gangneung
Winter Universiade
Bronze medal – third place	2003 Tarvisio
Pacific Junior Curling Championships
Gold medal – first place	2005 Tokoro
Asian Winter Games
Gold medal – first place	2003 Aomori
Bronze medal – third place	2017 Sapporo
Representing Gangwon
Korean Men's Championship
Gold medal – first place	2013 Chuncheon
Gold medal – first place	2014 Chongju
Gold medal – first place	2015 Icheon
Gold medal – first place	2016 Uiseong
Silver medal – second place	2017 Icheon
Bronze medal – third place	2011 Uijeongbu
Representing Seoul
Korean Men's Championship
Gold medal – first place	2018 Jincheon
Silver medal – second place	2019 Gangneung
Bronze medal – third place	2020 Gangneung
Representing Uiseong
Korean Men's Championship
Gold medal – first place	2021 Gangneung
Gold medal – first place	2025 Uijeongbu
Silver medal – second place	2022 Jincheon
Bronze medal – third place	2023 Gangneung
Bronze medal – third place	2024 Uijeongbu

Kim Soo-hyuk (born May 5, 1984) is a Korean curler from Gyeongi-do. He currently skips the Gyeongbuk Athletic Association curling team out of Uiseong.

== Career ==
At just 17 years old, Kim was a member of the Korean team at the 2001 Pacific Curling Championships, playing third for the team, skipped by Lee Dong-keun. The team finished fourth. He was the alternate on the Korean team at the 2002 Pacific Championships, and played in the 2003 Ford World Men's Curling Championship as the third for Lee's team. They would finish last (10th).

As a junior curler, Kim was the skip of the Korean junior men's team, competing at the World Junior Curling Championships in 2004 and 2005, finishing fourth and eighth respectively. He also led Korea to a gold medal at the inaugural Pacific Junior Curling Championships in 2005. Kim also won a bronze medal at the 2003 Winter Universiade, playing second for Lee.

After juniors, Kim would remain playing with Lee as his third. The team won a silver medal at the 2010 Pacific Curling Championships, qualifying Korea for the 2011 Ford World Men's Curling Championship. There, they finished 11th, with just two wins.

Kim began skipping the Korean men's team in 2013, winning a bronze medal at the renamed 2013 Pacific-Asia Curling Championships. He won another bronze at the 2014 Pacific-Asia Curling Championships, a gold at the 2015 Pacific-Asia Curling Championships and another bronze at the 2016 Pacific-Asia Curling Championships. The gold medal in 2015 qualified South Korea for the 2016 World Men's Curling Championship, where Kim would once again skip the Korean national team. There, Kim would lead his country to just two wins and nine losses, settling for 11th place.

Kim returned to the Pacific-Asia Championships in 2018, winning a bronze medal. This put the team into the 2019 World Qualification Event for a chance to make it to the 2019 World Men's Curling Championship. They won the event, qualifying them for the Worlds. However, at the World Championship, they struggled, finishing with a 1-11 record in last place.

On the World Curling Tour, Kim has played in one Grand Slam event, the 2014 Syncrude National. Kim's rink won two games at the event, including beating the world champion Niklas Edin rink. Since then he has won five World Curling Tour events, the 2014 Avonair Cash Spiel, the 2015 Uiseong International Curling Tour, the 2015 Avonair Cash Spiel, the 2017 Hokkaido Bank Curling Classic and the 2019 US Open of Curling.

== Personal life ==
Kim is married and has one daughter.
