= 2011–12 curling season =

- Sport: Curling

Seasons
- ← 2010–11 2012–13 →

The 2011–12 curling season began in September 2011 and ended in April 2012.

Note: In events with two genders, the men's tournament winners will be listed before the women's tournament winners.

== CCA-sanctioned events ==
This section lists events sanctioned by and/or conducted by the Canadian Curling Association (CCA). The following events in bold have been confirmed by the CCA as part of the 2011–12 Season of Champions programme as of December 6, 2010. The non-bold events are events sanctioned by the CCA.

Event	Winning team		Runner-up team
Canadian Mixed Curling Championship; Sudbury, Ontario, Nov. 12–19	Saskatchewan		Alberta
The Dominion Curling Club Championship; Richmond, British Columbia, Nov. 21–26	Alberta		Ontario
The Dominion Curling Club Championship; Richmond, British Columbia, Nov. 21–26	Manitoba		Ontario
**Canada Cup of Curling**; Cranbrook, British Columbia, Nov. 30–Dec. 4	(Alberta) Kevin Martin		(Ontario) Glenn Howard
**Canada Cup of Curling**; Cranbrook, British Columbia, Nov. 30–Dec. 4	(Manitoba) Jennifer Jones		(Manitoba) Chelsea Carey
**Continental Cup of Curling**; Langley, British Columbia, Jan. 12–15	(United Nations) World		(Canada) (United States) North America
Winter Youth Olympics; Innsbruck, Austria, Jan. 13–22	MT	Switzerland	Italy
Winter Youth Olympics; Innsbruck, Austria, Jan. 13–22	MD	Michael Brunner (SUI); Nicole Muskatewitz (GER)	Martin Sesaker (NOR); Kim Eun-bi (KOR)
**Canadian Junior Curling Championships**; Napanee, Ontario, Feb. 4–12	Alberta		Northern Ontario
**Canadian Junior Curling Championships**; Napanee, Ontario, Feb. 4–12	Alberta		Manitoba
World Wheelchair Curling Championship; Chuncheon City, South Korea, Feb. 18–25	Russia		South Korea
**Tournament of Hearts**; Red Deer, Alberta, Feb. 18–26	(Alberta) Heather Nedohin		(British Columbia) Kelly Scott
**Tim Hortons Brier**; Saskatoon, Saskatchewan, Mar. 3–11	(Ontario) Glenn Howard		(Alberta) Kevin Koe
World Junior Curling Championships; Östersund, Sweden, Mar. 3–11	Canada		Sweden
World Junior Curling Championships; Östersund, Sweden, Mar. 3–11	Scotland		Czech Republic
CIS/CCA University Curling Championships; Welland, Ontario, Mar. 14–18	Alberta Golden Bears		(Ontario) Waterloo Warriors
CIS/CCA University Curling Championships; Welland, Ontario, Mar. 14–18	(Ontario) Wilfrid Laurier Golden Hawks		(Ontario) Brock Badgers
**World Women's Curling Championship**; Lethbridge, Alberta, Mar. 17–25	Switzerland		Sweden
Canadian Senior Curling Championships; Abbotsford, British Columbia, Mar. 17–25	Alberta		Newfoundland and Labrador
Canadian Senior Curling Championships; Abbotsford, British Columbia, Mar. 17–25	Alberta		Newfoundland and Labrador
Canadian Wheelchair Curling Championship; Thunder Bay, Ontario, Mar. 18–25	Saskatchewan		Alberta
CCAA Curling Invitational Championship; Peterborough, Ontario, Mar. 21–24	(Ontario) Fanshawe Falcons		(Alberta) Red Deer Kings
CCAA Curling Invitational Championship; Peterborough, Ontario, Mar. 21–24	(Ontario) Fanshawe Falcons		(Alberta) Grande Prairie Wolves
Canadian Masters Curling Championships; Montreal, Quebec, Mar. 26–Apr. 1	Newfoundland and Labrador		Quebec
Canadian Masters Curling Championships; Montreal, Quebec, Mar. 26–Apr. 1	Saskatchewan		Ontario
World Men's Curling Championship; Basel, Switzerland, Mar. 31–Apr. 8	Canada		Scotland
World Senior Curling Championships; Tårnby, Denmark, Apr. 14–21	Ireland		Canada
World Senior Curling Championships; Tårnby, Denmark, Apr. 14–21	Canada		Scotland
World Mixed Doubles Curling Championship; Erzurum, Turkey, Apr. 23–29	Switzerland		Sweden

== Other events ==
Note: Events that have not been placed on the CCA's list of sanctioned events are listed here.

Event	Winning team		Runner-up team
European Mixed Curling Championship; Tårnby, Denmark, Sep. 30–Oct. 8	Switzerland		Germany
European Curling Championships — Group C Tårnby, Denmark, Sep. 30–Oct. 8	C	Poland	Lithuania
European Curling Championships — Group C Tårnby, Denmark, Sep. 30–Oct. 8	C	Poland	Slovakia
World Wheelchair Curling Championship Qualification; Lohja, Finland, Nov. 5–10	Slovakia		Italy
Pacific-Asia Curling Championships; Nanjing, China, Nov. 19–26	China		New Zealand
Pacific-Asia Curling Championships; Nanjing, China, Nov. 19–26	China		South Korea
European Curling Championships; Moscow, Russia, Dec. 2–10	A	Norway	Sweden
European Curling Championships; Moscow, Russia, Dec. 2–10	A	Scotland	Sweden
European Curling Championships; Moscow, Russia, Dec. 2–10	B	Russia	Hungary
European Curling Championships; Moscow, Russia, Dec. 2–10	B	Hungary	Finland
European Junior Curling Challenge; Copenhagen, Denmark, Jan. 3–8	Italy		Russia
European Junior Curling Challenge; Copenhagen, Denmark, Jan. 3–8	Italy		Denmark
TSN Curling Skins Game; Rama, Ontario, Jan. 7–8	(Alberta) Kevin Koe		(Manitoba) Jeff Stoughton
Karuizawa International Curling Championship; Karuizawa, Japan, Jan. 25–29	(Japan) Yusuke Morozumi		(Canada) Colin Thomas
Karuizawa International Curling Championship; Karuizawa, Japan, Jan. 25–29	(Canada) Laura Crocker		(Switzerland) Silvana Tirinzoni
USA-Brazil Challenge; Bemidji, Minnesota, Jan. 27–29	Not held		
Pacific-Asia Junior Curling Championships; Jeonju City, South Korea, Jan. 27–Feb. 2	China		South Korea
Pacific-Asia Junior Curling Championships; Jeonju City, South Korea, Jan. 27–Feb. 2	Japan		South Korea

== World Curling Tour ==
Grand Slam events in bold.

Note: More events may be posted as time progresses.

=== Men's events ===
Week	Event	Winning skip	Runner-up skip
3	Baden Masters; Baden, Switzerland, Sept. 2–4	(Switzerland) Sven Michel	(Scotland) Tom Brewster
5	AMJ Campbell Shorty Jenkins Classic; Brockville, Ontario, Sept. 15–18	(Ontario) John Epping	(Ontario) Chad Allen
5	The Shoot-Out; Edmonton, Alberta, Sept. 15–18	(Alberta) Randy Ferbey	(Alberta) Rob Bucholz
5	Cloverdale Cash Spiel; Surrey, British Columbia, Sept. 15–18	(Russia) Alexey Tselousov	(British Columbia) Brent Pierce
6	Radisson Blu Oslo Cup; Oslo, Norway, Sept. 22–25	(Sweden) Niklas Edin	(Scotland) Tom Brewster
6	Green Bay Cash Spiel; Green Bay, Wisconsin, Sept. 23–25	(China) Liu Rui	(Minnesota) Mike Farbelow
6	Point Optical Curling Classic; Saskatoon, Saskatchewan, Sept. 23–26	(Manitoba) Mike McEwen	(Alberta) Kevin Martin
7	Twin Anchors Invitational; Vernon, British Columbia, Sept. 30–Oct. 3	(Alberta) Robert Schlender	(British Columbia) Brent Pierce
7	Horizon Laser Vision Center Classic; Regina, Saskatchewan, Sept. 30–Oct. 3	(Saskatchewan) Scott Bitz	(Saskatchewan) Mark Herbert
7	Swiss Cup Basel; Basel, Sept. 30–Oct. 2	(Canada) Brad Gushue	(Switzerland) Peter de Cruz
8	StuSells Toronto Tankard; Toronto, Ontario, Oct. 7–10	(Ontario) Chris Gardner	(Ontario) Robert Rumfeldt
8	Westcoast Curling Classic; New Westminster, British Columbia, Oct. 7–10	(Alberta) Kevin Martin	(Manitoba) Mike McEwen
8	Manitoba Lotteries Men's Curling Classic; Brandon, Manitoba, Oct. 7–10	(China) Liu Rui	(Manitoba) Rob Fowler
9	St. Paul Cash Spiel; St. Paul, Minnesota, Oct. 13–16	(Minnesota) Tyler George	(Ontario) Jeff Currie
9	Meyers Norris Penny Charity Classic; Medicine Hat, Alberta, Oct. 14–17	(Alberta) Jamie King	(Alberta) Brock Virtue
10	Challenge Casino Lac Leamy; Buckingham, Quebec, Oct. 20–23	(Quebec) Jean-Michel Ménard	(Ontario) Brad Jacobs
10	Canad Inns Prairie Classic; Portage la Prairie, Manitoba, Oct. 21–24	(Manitoba) Mike McEwen	(Alberta) Randy Ferbey
10	Labatt Crown of Curling; Kamloops, British Columbia, Oct. 21–24	(British Columbia) Andrew Bilesky	(British Columbia) Grant Olsen
10	Curling Masters Champéry; Champéry, Switzerland, Oct. 21–23	(Switzerland) Peter de Cruz	(Scotland) Tom Brewster
11	Cactus Pheasant Classic; Brooks, Alberta, Oct. 27–30	(Manitoba) Mike McEwen	(Alberta) Randy Ferbey
12	**GP Car and Home World Cup of Curling**; Sault Ste. Marie, Ontario, Nov. 2–6	(Ontario) Glenn Howard	(Ontario) John Epping
12	Red Deer Curling Classic; Red Deer, Alberta, Nov. 4–7	(Alberta) Jamie King	(Northwest Territories) Jamie Koe
13	Vancouver Island Shootout; Victoria, British Columbia, Nov. 11–13	(British Columbia) Bryan Miki	(Alberta) Jamie King
13	Whites Drug Store Classic; Swan River, Manitoba, Nov. 11–14	(Manitoba) Reid Carruthers	(Saskatchewan) Colton Flasch
13	World Financial Group Classic; Calgary, Alberta, Nov. 11–13	(Alberta) Brock Virtue	(Alberta) Tom Appelman
14	Sun Life Classic; Brantford, Ontario, Nov. 18–21	(Sweden) Niklas Edin	(Switzerland) Sven Michel
14	Wainwright Roaming Buffalo Classic; Wainwright, Alberta, Nov. 18–21	(British Columbia) Brent Pierce	(Alberta) Wade White
14	Interlake Pharmacy Classic; Stonewall, Manitoba, Nov. 18–21	(Manitoba) William Lyburn	(Manitoba) Chris Galbraith
15	Challenge Casino de Charlevoix; Clermont, Quebec, Nov. 24–27	(Prince Edward Island) Brett Gallant	(Newfoundland and Labrador) Brad Gushue
15	DEKALB Superspiel; Morris, Manitoba, Nov. 24–27	(Saskatchewan) Braeden Moskowy	(Manitoba) William Lyburn
15	Edinburgh International; Edinburgh, Scotland, Nov. 25–27	(Scotland) Tom Brewster	(Scotland) Sandy Reid
15	Seattle Cash Spiel; Seattle, Washington, Nov. 25–27	(British Columbia) Jay Wakefield	(British Columbia) Jody Epp
16	Laphroaig Scotch Open; Madison, Wisconsin, Dec. 2–4	(Minnesota) Pete Fenson	(Wisconsin) David Brown
16	Dauphin Clinic Pharmacy Classic; Dauphin, Manitoba, Dec. 2–5	(Saskatchewan) Brent Gedak	(Manitoba) Chris Galbraith
18	**BDO Canadian Open of Curling**; Kingston, Ontario, Dec. 14–18	(Manitoba) Mike McEwen	(Manitoba) Jeff Stoughton
18	Curl Mesabi Cash Spiel; Eveleth, Minnesota, Dec. 16–18	(Wisconsin) Craig Brown	(Minnesota) Todd Birr
21	Mercure Perth Masters; Perth, Scotland, Jan. 5–8	(Canada) Mike McEwen	(Norway) Thomas Ulsrud
24	**Pomeroy Inn & Suites National**; Dawson Creek, British Columbia, Jan. 25–29	(Ontario) Glenn Howard	(Alberta) Kevin Martin
24	German Masters; Hamburg, Germany, Jan. 27–29	(United States) Tyler George	(Germany) Wolfgang Burba
25	Pharmasave Gimli Classic; Gimli, Manitoba, Feb. 3–5	Cancelled	
30	Pomeroy Inn & Suites Prairie Showdown; Grande Prairie, Alberta, Mar. 8–11	(Alberta) Kevin Martin	(China) Liu Rui
33	Victoria Curling Classic Invitational; Victoria, British Columbia, Mar. 29–Apr. 1	(Alberta) Kevin Martin	(Manitoba) Mike McEwen
36	**Sun Life Financial Players' Championship**; Summerside, Prince Edward Island, Apr. 17–22	(Ontario) John Epping	(Ontario) Glenn Howard

=== Women's events ===
Week	Event	Winning skip	Runner-up skip
5	AMJ Campbell Shorty Jenkins Classic; Brockville, Ontario, Sept. 15–18	(Ontario) Sherry Middaugh	(Ontario) Rachel Homan
5	The Shoot-Out; Edmonton, Alberta, Sept. 15–18	(Saskatchewan) Stefanie Lawton	(Alberta) Cheryl Bernard
5	Cloverdale Cash Spiel; Surrey, British Columbia, Sept. 15–18	(British Columbia) Kelley Law	(Russia) Liudmila Privivkova
6	Radisson Blu Oslo Cup; Oslo, Norway, Sept. 22–25	(Canada) Jennifer Jones	(Sweden) Margaretha Sigfridsson
6	Schmirler Curling Classic; Regina, Saskatchewan, Sept. 23–26	(Russia) Liudmila Privivkova	(Saskatchewan) Jolene Campbell
7	Twin Anchors Invitational; Vernon, British Columbia, Sept. 29–Oct. 2	(Alberta) Shannon Kleibrink	(Alberta) Lisa Eyamie
8	**Curlers Corner Autumn Gold Curling Classic**; Calgary, Alberta, Oct. 7–10	(Manitoba) Cathy Overton-Clapham	(Alberta) Shannon Kleibrink
8	StuSells Toronto Tankard; Toronto, Ontario, Oct. 7–10	(Ontario) Cathy Auld	(Ontario) Lisa Farnell
8	Credit Suisse Women's Masters Basel; Basel, Switzerland, Oct. 7–9	(Sweden) Margaretha Sigfridsson	(Switzerland) Mirjam Ott
9	Meyers Norris Penny Charity Classic; Medicine Hat, Alberta, Oct. 14–17	(Scotland) Eve Muirhead	(Alberta) Crystal Webster
10	**Manitoba Lotteries Women's Curling Classic**; Winnipeg, Manitoba, Oct. 21–24	(Alberta) Renée Sonnenberg	(Alberta) Heather Nedohin
10	Labatt Crown of Curling; Kamloops, British Columbia, Oct. 21–24	(Switzerland) Michèle Jäggi	(Russia) Olga Zyablikova
10	Challenge Casino Lac Leamy; Buckingham, Quebec, Oct. 21–23	(Ontario) Jenn Hanna	(Quebec) Marie-France Larouche
11	Colonial Square Ladies Classic; Saskatoon, Saskatchewan, Oct. 28–31	(Alberta) Crystal Webster	(Alberta) Valerie Sweeting
12	Royal LePage OVCA Women's Fall Classic; Kemptville, Ontario, Nov. 3–6	(Ontario) Sherry Middaugh	(Ontario) Jenn Hanna
12	Stockholm Ladies Cup; Stockholm, Sweden, Nov. 3–6	(Russia) Liudmila Privivkova	(Sweden) Anna Hasselborg
12	Red Deer Curling Classic; Red Deer, Alberta, Nov. 4–7	(Switzerland) Silvana Tirinzoni	(British Columbia) Kelley Law
13	Vancouver Island Shootout; Victoria, British Columbia, Nov. 11–13	(British Columbia) Roselyn Craig	(Japan) Ayumi Ogasawara
14	Interlake Pharmacy Classic; Stonewall, Manitoba, Nov. 18–21	(Manitoba) Barb Spencer	(Manitoba) Joelle Brown
14	Sun Life Classic; Brantford, Ontario, Nov. 18–21	(Ontario) Sherry Middaugh	(Wisconsin) Erika Brown
15	DEKALB Superspiel; Morris, Manitoba, Nov. 24–27	(Manitoba) Barb Spencer	(Manitoba) Lisa DeRiviere
15	International ZO women's tournament Wetzikon, Switzerland, Nov. 25–27	(Germany) Andrea Schöpp	(Switzerland) Mirjam Ott
15	Boundary Ford Curling Classic; Lloydminster, Alberta, Nov. 25–28	(Alberta) Jessie Kaufman	(Alberta) Dana Ferguson
16	Laphroaig Scotch Open; Madison, Wisconsin, Dec. 2–4	(Wisconsin) Erika Brown	(New York (state)) Patti Lank
18	Curl Mesabi Cash Spiel; Eveleth, Minnesota, Dec. 16–18	(Minnesota) Cassandra Potter	(Minnesota) Allison Pottinger
22	International Bernese Ladies Cup; Bern, Switzerland, Jan. 13–15	(Switzerland) Michèle Jäggi	(Canada) Jennifer Jones
23	Glynhill Ladies International; Glasgow, Scotland, Jan. 20–22	(Switzerland) Mirjam Ott	(Switzerland) Michèle Jäggi
30	Pomeroy Inn & Suites Prairie Showdown; Grande Prairie, Alberta, Mar. 8–11	(Alberta) Shannon Kleibrink	(Alberta) Renée Sonnenberg
31	Victoria Curling Classic Invitational; Victoria, British Columbia, Mar. 29–Apr. 1	(Manitoba) Chelsea Carey	(Alberta) Shannon Kleibrink
36	**Sun Life Financial Players' Championship**; Summerside, Prince Edward Island, Apr. 17–22	(Saskatchewan) Stefanie Lawton	(Manitoba) Cathy Overton-Clapham

== WCT Order of Merit rankings ==
Men

as of Week 36
#	Skip	Points
1	(Manitoba) Mike McEwen	476.130
2	(Alberta) Kevin Martin	468.510
3	(Ontario) Glenn Howard	463.733
4	(Manitoba) Jeff Stoughton	368.665
5	(Sweden) Niklas Edin	329.415
6	(Alberta) Kevin Koe	316.875
7	(Norway) Thomas Ulsrud	239.844
8	(Ontario) John Epping	231.433
9	(Manitoba) Rob Fowler	219.855
10	(Newfoundland and Labrador) Brad Gushue	184.383

Women

as of Week 36
#	Skip	Points
1	(Manitoba) Jennifer Jones	416.500
2	(Alberta) Heather Nedohin	308.715
3	(Saskatchewan) Stefanie Lawton	279.225
4	(Switzerland) Mirjam Ott	247.905
5	(Manitoba) Chelsea Carey	244.970
6	(Alberta) Shannon Kleibrink	236.840
7	(Saskatchewan) Amber Holland	210.509
8	(Ontario) Sherry Middaugh	207.685
9	(Manitoba) Cathy Overton-Clapham	193.962
10	(Sweden) Margaretha Sigfridsson	180.935

== WCT Money List ==
Men

as of Week 36
#	Skip	$ (CAD)
1	(Manitoba) Mike McEwen	149,969
2	(Alberta) Kevin Martin	105,000
3	(Ontario) Glenn Howard	100,750
4	(Ontario) John Epping	65,500
5	(Alberta) Kevin Koe	61,250
6	(Sweden) Niklas Edin	56,993
7	(Newfoundland and Labrador) Brad Gushue	54,554
8	(Manitoba) Jeff Stoughton	50,008
9	(Alberta) Randy Ferbey	41,000
10	(Scotland) Tom Brewster	38,356

Women

as of Week 36
#	Skip	$ (CAD)
1	(Manitoba) Cathy Overton-Clapham	52,422
2	(Ontario) Sherry Middaugh	49,000
3	(Manitoba) Jennifer Jones	44,858
4	(Saskatchewan) Stefanie Lawton	43,200
5	(Switzerland) Michèle Jäggi	25,492
6	(Russia) Liudmila Privivkova	24,953
7	(Switzerland) Silvana Tirinzoni	23,974
8	(Alberta) Renée Sonnenberg	23,500
9	(Alberta) Crystal Webster	23,150
10	(Switzerland) Mirjam Ott	22,982

== The Dominion MA Cup ==
The Dominion MA Cup presented by TSN was contested in the 2011–12 season. The Cup was awarded to the Canadian Curling Association Member Association (MA) who has had the most success during the season in CCA-sanctioned events. Events include the Canadian mixed championship, men's and women's juniors championships, the Scotties, the Brier, the men's and women's senior championships and the national wheelchair championship. Points were awarded based on placement in each of the events, with the top association receiving 14 points, then the 2nd place team with 13, etc.

Alberta won the second Dominion MA Cup, finishing first in five of the eight events, including the Scotties, and finishing second in the other three events, including the Brier. Alberta also defended its title from last year, when they tied with Saskatchewan. Saskatchewan finished in fourth place with two first-place finishes, while last year's runner-up Manitoba finished in a close third, losing second place to Ontario, which had one first-place finish.

=== Standings ===
Rank	Member Association	CMCC	CWJCC	CMJCC	Scotties	Brier	CWSCC	CMSCC	CWhCC	Total Pts.	Avg. Pts
1	Alberta	13	14	14	14	13	14	14	13	109.000	13.625
2	Ontario	9	11	7	7	14	10	12	12	82.000	10.250
3	Manitoba	8	13	12	12	12	6	9	9	81.000	10.125
4	Saskatchewan	14	9	10	9	4	9	7	14	76.000	9.500
5	Northern Ontario	6	8	13	–	9	8	10	10	64.000	9.143
6	British Columbia	11	12	2	13	7	5	11	7	68.000	8.500
7	New Brunswick	12	6	6	8	10	11	6	–	59.000	8.429
8	Quebec	7	5	8	11	6	7	8	11	63.000	7.875
9	Nova Scotia	3	10	11	4	5	12	5	8	58.000	7.250
10	Newfoundland and Labrador	4	3	3	6	8	13	13	6	56.000	7.000
11	Prince Edward Island	10	7	5	3	3	4	4	–	36.000	5.143
12	Northwest Territories	5	2	4	5	11	3	2	–	32.000	4.571
13	Yukon	1	4	9	–	–	2	3	–	23.000	3.286
14	Nunavut	2	–	–	–	–	–	–	–	2.000	2.000

== Capital One Cup ==
The Capital One Cup was a season-long competition that awarded curling teams point values for their participation in Capital One Grand Slam of Curling events. At the end of the season, the men's and women's teams with the top three point values were awarded a purse of prize money.

The points were allocated as follows:

Grand Slam Event Key
Autumn	Curlers Corner Autumn Gold Curling Classic
BDO	BDO Canadian Open of Curling
GPPC	GP Car and Home Players' Championship
GPWC	GP Car and Home World Cup of Curling
Manitoba	Manitoba Lotteries Women's Curling Classic
National	Pomeroy Inn & Suites National

Rank	Point Value	
Rank	GPWC, National, BDO Autumn, Manitoba, Sobeys	GPPC
1st	12 points	24 points
2nd	9 points	18 points
3rd/4th	7 points	14 points
5th–8th	5 points	10 points
Qualifying	1 point per win	–

Men

#	Team	GPWC	BDO	National	GPPC	Total
1	(Ontario) Glenn Howard	12	7	12	18	49
2	(Alberta) Kevin Martin	7	5	9	14	35
3	(Ontario) John Epping	9	1	–	24	34
4	(Manitoba) Mike McEwen	5	12	2	14	31
5	(Manitoba) Jeff Stoughton	5	9	5	10	29
5	(Sweden) Niklas Edin	7	7	5	10	29
6	(Newfoundland and Labrador) Brad Gushue	5	2	7	10	24
7	(Alberta) Kevin Koe	5	3	5	10	23
8	(British Columbia) Jim Cotter	1	2	7	–	10
9	(Manitoba) Rob Fowler	2	5	2	–	9
10	(Ontario) Brad Jacobs	2	5	–	–	7
11	(Norway) Thomas Ulsrud	1	–	5	–	6
12	(Quebec) Jean-Michel Ménard	–	5	–	–	5
13	(Alberta) Randy Ferbey	3	1	–	–	4
14	(Saskatchewan) Steve Laycock	1	0	2	–	3
14	(Ontario) Greg Balsdon	3	–	–	–	3
14	(Alberta) Brent Bawel	–	–	3	–	3
15	(Alberta) Robert Schlender	1	1	0	–	2
15	(Ontario) Dale Matchett	1	1	–	–	2
15	(Scotland) Tom Brewster	–	2	–	–	2
15	(Alberta) Jamie King	–	–	2	–	2
15	(Ontario) Robert Rumfeldt	–	–	2	–	2
15	(Alberta) Brock Virtue	–	–	2	–	2
16	(Ontario) Mark Kean	0	1	–	–	1
16	(British Columbia) Brent Pierce	–	–	1	–	1
17	(Alberta) Steve Petryk	–	–	0	–	0

Women

#	Team	Autumn	Manitoba	GPPC	Total
1	(Manitoba) Cathy Overton-Clapham	12	7	18	37
2	(Saskatchewan) Stefanie Lawton	5	5	24	34
3	(Manitoba) Jennifer Jones	4	5	14	23
4	(Ontario) Sherry Middaugh	7	1	14	22
5	(Alberta) Heather Nedohin	1	9	10	20
6	(Manitoba) Chelsea Carey	2	4	10	16
7	(Alberta) Renée Sonnenberg	3	12	–	15
8	(Scotland) Eve Muirhead	3	–	10	13
9	(Alberta) Cheryl Bernard	5	7	–	12
10	(Alberta) Shannon Kleibrink	9	–	–	9
10	(Ontario) Krista McCarville	7	2	–	9
10	(British Columbia) Kelly Scott	4	5	–	9
11	(Alberta) Dana Ferguson	5	3	–	8
12	(Saskatchewan) Amber Holland	3	4	–	7
13	(Alberta) Desirée Owen	1	4	–	5
13	(Manitoba) Darcy Robertson	–	5	–	5
13	(Alberta) Crystal Webster	5	–	–	5
14	(Alberta) Nadine Chyz	4	–	–	4
14	(Ontario) Rachel Homan	1	3	–	4
14	(Sweden) Margaretha Sigfridsson	–	4	–	4
14	(Alberta) Valerie Sweeting	2	2	–	4
14	(Manitoba) Jill Thurston	2	2	–	4
15	(Wisconsin) Erika Brown	1	2	–	3
15	(Alberta) Delia DeJong	3	–	–	3
15	(Ontario) Julie Hastings	–	3	–	3
15	(Ontario) Tracy Horgan	3	–	–	3
15	(Nova Scotia) Heather Smith-Dacey	–	3	–	3
16	(Northwest Territories) Kerry Galusha	2	–	–	2
16	(South Korea) Kim Ji-Sun	2	–	–	2
16	(Manitoba) Briane Meilleur	–	2	–	2
16	(Alberta) Casey Scheidegger	2	–	–	2
17	(Manitoba) Joelle Brown	–	1	–	1
17	(Japan) Satsuki Fujisawa	–	1	–	1
17	(Manitoba) Janet Harvey	–	1	–	1
17	(Alberta) Jessie Kaufman	1	0	–	1
17	(Manitoba) Michelle Montford	–	1	–	1
17	(Sweden) Anette Norberg	–	1	–	1
17	(Russia) Liudmila Privivkova	1	–	–	1
17	(Manitoba) Barb Spencer	–	1	–	1
18	(Saskatchewan) Chantelle Eberle	–	0	–	0
18	(Alberta) Tanilla Doyle	0	–	–	0
18	(Alberta) Lisa Eyamie	0	–	–	0
18	(New York (state)) Patti Lank	0	–	–	0
18	(Manitoba) Kim Link	–	0	–	0
18	(Manitoba) Deb McCreanor	–	0	–	0
18	(Minnesota) Allison Pottinger	0	–	–	0

== Notable team changes ==
=== Retirements ===
- **Kim Dolan**, one of Prince Edward Island's most notable curlers, retired from competitive curling following her final Scotties appearance.
- (Alberta) **Randy Ferbey**, one of the most dominant curlers in recent history, retired from competitive curling after his team broke up.

=== Careers on hiatus ===
- (Ontario) Sisters **Jenn Hanna** and **Stephanie Hanna** announced that they will leave competitive curling, and do not intend to play competitively in the near future.

=== Team line-up changes ===
Teams listed by skip, new teammates listed in bold

- (Nova Scotia) Mary-Anne Arsenault: Arsenault replaced current third Stephanie McVicar with former teammate and skip **Colleen Jones**, a six-time Canadian champion who won five championships with Arsenault. Jones will play third, while Arsenault's current second, Kim Kelly, and lead, Jennifer Baxter, will remain in their current positions.
- (Alberta) Cheryl Bernard: Bernard decided to drop her lead Jennifer Sadleir after only one season together due to off-ice issues. **Shannon Aleksic**, a Saskatchewan native who previously played for British Columbia's Kelley Law, will join the team as the new lead.
- Suzanne Birt: Robyn MacPhee, Birt's current second, decided to take a year off of competitive curling, and will be replaced by **Sarah Fullerton**, a former Prince Edward Island provincial junior champion.
- Jim Cotter: Third Kevin Folk has relocated to Calgary for work. Folk has been replaced by former Winnipeg skip and Russian national champion **Jason Gunnlaugson**, who moved to British Columbia for work.
- (Newfoundland and Labrador) Brad Gushue: Third Ryan Fry left the team following the end of the 2012 Tim Hortons Brier. **Brett Gallant**, a former Canadian Junior champion from Prince Edward Island, will join the team as Fry's replacement. Gallant will play at second, while current second Adam Casey will play at third.
- Amber Holland: Holland parted ways with her team of Heather Kalenchuk, Tammy Schneider and Kim Schneider, and formed a new squad consisting of **Dailene Sivertson**, **Brooklyn Lemon** and **Jolene Campbell**. Siverston, a former British Columbia provincial junior champion, last played as Kelly Scott's second, and will play lead for Holland. Lemon, a former provincial junior champion of Saskatchewan, joins as second, and Campbell, a former skip and Holland's alternate in recent seasons, will play as third.
- Shannon Kleibrink: Longtime third Amy Nixon, who left the team in March to form her own team, was replaced by **Kalynn Park**, who is a former Alberta provincial junior champion. Park will play as second, while Bronwen Webster, who sat out as alternate for much of the season due to pregnancy, will be promoted from second to third following her return.
- **Amy Nixon** left her longtime skip Shannon Kleibrink to form a new squad consisting of **Nadine Chyz**, **Whitney More** and **Tracy Bush**. Chyz, who will play as third, is a former Canadian Junior champion and World Junior silver medallist. More, who will play as second, is a former Alberta provincial champion, while Bush, who will play as lead, is also a former Canadian Junior champion and World Junior silver medallist.
- (British Columbia) Kelly Scott: Lead Jacquie Armstrong retired from curling, and second Dailene Sivertson left the team to play lead for Amber Holland. **Sarah Wazney**, a former Canadian Junior champion, will be joining the team at lead.
- (Nova Scotia) Heather Smith-Dacey: Third Danielle Parsons left the team and was replaced by **Stephanie McVicar**, a former Canadian Junior silver medallist.
- (Manitoba) Jeff Stoughton: Longtime lead Steve Gould was dropped from the team. Gould has been replaced by Olympic gold medalist **Mark Nichols**, who previously played with Brad Gushue.

== See also ==
- World Curling Tour Home
- Season of Champions Home

Preceded by 2010–11	2011–12 curling season September 2011 – April 2012	Succeeded by 2012–13
