= Island Shootout =

Curling tournament in Victoria, British Columbia

- Established: 2011
- 2026 host city: Victoria, British Columbia
- 2026 arena: Victoria Curling Club
- Men's purse: $8,500
- Women's purse: $4,300

Current champions (2026)
- Men: (South Korea) Jeong Yeong-seok
- Women: (Japan) Ikue Kitazawa

The Island Shootout, previously known as the Vancouver Island Shootout, is an annual curling bonspiel that was established in 2011. For the 2011–12 curling season, the event took place at the Juan de Fuca Curling Club in Colwood, British Columbia. The men's event was held in a triple knockout format, and the women's event was held in a round robin format. For the 2012–13 curling season and 2014–15 curling season, the event took place at the Victoria Curling Club in Victoria, British Columbia, and both the men's and women's events were held in a triple knockout format.

In 2023, the event was held for a fourth time after a nine-year hiatus under the name Island Shootout. It was held at the Victoria Curling Club and served as a qualifier for the BC men's and women's provincial championships.

== Past Champions ==
=== Men ===
| Year | Winning team | Runner up team | Purse (CAD) |
|---|---|---|---|
| 2011 | (British Columbia) Dean Joanisse (Fourth), Tyler Klitch, Bryan Miki (Skip), Jay Batch | (Alberta) Blake MacDonald (Fourth), Jamie King (Skip), Todd Brick, Sean Morris | $10,500 |
| 2012 | (British Columbia) Michael Johnson (Fourth), Paul Cseke, Jay Wakefield (Skip), John Cullen | (British Columbia) Neil Dangerfield, Dennis Sutton, Darren Boden, Glen Allen | $14,000 |
| 2014 | (British Columbia) Dean Joanisse, Paul Cseke, Jay Wakefield, John Cullen | (British Columbia) Sean Geall, Andrew Bilesky, Steve Kopf, Mark Olson | $11,000 |
| 2023 | (British Columbia) Jason Montgomery, Chris Baier, Miles Craig, Troy Cowan | (British Columbia) Kyler Kleibrink, Sébastien Robillard, Andrew Nerpin, Jordan Tardi | $10,000 |
| 2024 | (British Columbia) Jason Montgomery, Chris Baier, Miles Craig, Troy Cowan | (British Columbia) Cameron de Jong, Corey Chester, Alex Horvath, Brayden Carpenter | $18,000 |
| 2026 | (South Korea) Jeong Yeong-seok, Park Jong-duk, Lee Ki-bok, Oh Seung-hoon, Seong Ji-hoon | (British Columbia) Neil Dangerfield, Mike Wood, Darren Boden, Glen Allen | $8,500 |

=== Women ===
| Year | Winning team | Runner up team | Purse (CAD) |
|---|---|---|---|
| 2011 | (British Columbia) Sarah Wark (Fourth), Michelle Allen, Roselyn Craig (Skip), Megan Reid | (Japan) Ayumi Ogasawara, Yumie Funayama, Kaho Onodera, Chinami Yoshida | $10,000 |
| 2012 | (British Columbia) Roberta Kuhn, Karla Thompson, Michelle Ramsay, Christen Wilson | (Alberta) Heather Jensen, Shana Snell, Heather Rogers, Carly Quigley | $14,000 |
| 2014 | (British Columbia) Sarah Wark, Simone Brosseau, Michelle Allen, Rachelle Kallechy | (British Columbia) Diane Gushulak, Grace MacInnes, Lorelle Weiss, Sandra Comadina | $5,600 |
| 2023 | (British Columbia) Kristen Ryan, Shannon Joanisse, Megan Daniels, Kristen Fox | (British Columbia) Emily Bowles, Meredith Cole, Gabby Brissette, Mahra Harris | $10,000 |
| 2024 | (British Columbia) Taylor Reese-Hansen, Megan McGillivray, Kim Bonneau, Julianna Mackenzie | (British Columbia) Steph Jackson-Baier, Jessie Sanderson, Ashley Sanderson, Diane Gushulak | $5,000 |
| 2026 | (Japan) Ikue Kitazawa, Seina Nakajima, Minori Suzuki, Hasumi Ishigooka | (South Korea) Kim Hye-rin, Kim Cho-hi, Kim Seon-yeong (3 player team) | $4,300 |
