= 2012 in curling =

Major events in the sport of curling held in 2012 can refer to events that are part of one of the following seasons:

- 2011–12 curling season, which ends in April 2012
- 2012–13 curling season, which begins in September 2012
