= 2012 Vancouver Island Shootout =

World Curling Tour event

- Host city: Victoria, British Columbia
- Arena: Victoria Curling Club
- Dates: November 9–12
- Men's winner: (British Columbia) Jay Wakefield
- Skip: Jay Wakefield
- Fourth: Michael Johnson
- Third: Paul Cseke
- Lead: John Cullen
- Finalist: (British Columbia) Neil Dangerfield
- Women's winner: (British Columbia) Roberta Kuhn
- Skip: Roberta Kuhn
- Third: Karla Thompson
- Second: Michelle Ramsay
- Lead: Christen Wilson
- Finalist: (Alberta) Heather Jensen

The 2012 Vancouver Island Shootout was held from November 9 to 12 at the Victoria Curling Club in Victoria, British Columbia as part of the 2012–13 World Curling Tour. The event was held in a triple knockout format, and the purses for the men's and women's events were CAD$14,000 each, of which the winners of each event received CAD$5,000. In the men's final, Jay Wakefield defeated Neil Dangerfield with a score of 9–2, while in the women's final, Roberta Kuhn defeated Heather Jensen with a score of 5–3.

== Men ==
=== Teams ===
The teams are listed as follows:

| Skip | Third | Second | Lead | Locale |
|---|---|---|---|---|
| Andrew Bilesky | Stephen Kopf | Derek Errington | Aaron Watson | Vancouver, British Columbia |
| Steve Birklid | Chris Bond | Matt Birklid | Atticus Wallace | (Washington (state)) Seattle, Washington |
| Cliff Carr-Hilton | | | | Campbell River, British Columbia |
| Brady Clark | Sean Beighton | Darren Lehto | Steve Lundeen | (Washington (state)) Seattle, Washington |
| Jason Clarke | William Sutton | Ken Miscovitch | Zac Capron | Victoria, British Columbia |
| Wes Craig | | | | Victoria, British Columbia |
| Neil Dangerfield | Dennis Sutton | Darren Boden | Glen Allen | Victoria, British Columbia |
| Jody Epp | Blair Cusack | Brad Kocurek | James York | British Columbia |
| Tyler Klymchuk | Corey Chester | Sanjay Bowry | Rhys Gamache | Vancouver, British Columbia |
| Ken McArdle | Jared Bowles | Dylan Somerton | Michael Horita | New Westminster, British Columbia |
| Jason Montgomery | Miles Craig | William Duggan | Josh Hozack | Duncan, British Columbia |
| Jay Tuson | Colin Mantik | Glen Jackson | Ken Tucker | Victoria, British Columbia |
| Steve Waatainen | Kevin Weinrich | Sean Krepps | Keith Clarke | Nanaimo, British Columbia |
| Michael Johnson (fourth) | Paul Cseke | Jay Wakefield (skip) | John Cullen | New Westminster, British Columbia |
| Mike Wood | Greg Hawkes | Sean Cromarty | Paul Awalt | Victoria, British Columbia |

=== Knockout results ===
The draw is listed as follows:

==== A event ====
| First Knockout | | Semifinals | | Qualifier 1 |
| | | (British Columbia) Andrew Bilesky | 5 |
| (British Columbia) Steve Waatainen | 2 | (British Columbia) Jay Tuson | 4 |
| (British Columbia) Jay Tuson | 5 | | | (British Columbia) Andrew Bilesky | 4 |
| (British Columbia) Jason Montgomery | 7 | | | (Washington (state)) Brady Clark | 7 |
| (British Columbia) Tyler Klymchuk | 2 | (British Columbia) Jason Montgomery | 8 |
| (Washington (state)) Brady Clark | 6 | (Washington (state)) Brady Clark | 9 |
| (British Columbia) Jason Clarke | 2 |

| First Knockout | | Semifinals | | Qualifier 2 |
| (British Columbia) Jay Wakefield | 8 |
| (British Columbia) Cliff Carr-Hilton | 4 | (British Columbia) Jay Wakefield | 6 |
| (British Columbia) Ken McArdle | 7 | (British Columbia) Ken McArdle | 3 |
| (Washington (state)) Steve Birkild | 4 | | | (British Columbia) Jay Wakefield | 8 |
| (British Columbia) Jody Epp | 2 | | | (British Columbia) Neil Dangerfield | 1 |
| (British Columbia) Wes Craig | 10 | (British Columbia) Wes Craig | 2 |
| (British Columbia) Neil Dangerfield | 5 | (British Columbia) Neil Dangerfield | 6 |
| (British Columbia) Mike Wood | 4 |

==== B event ====
Second Knockout
(British Columbia) Tyler Klymchuk | 5
(British Columbia) Jason Clarke | 7

Quarterfinals
(British Columbia) Ken McArdle | 7
(British Columbia) Steve Waatainen | 5
(British Columbia) Wes Craig | 4
(British Columbia) Jason Clarke | 11

Semifinals
(British Columbia) Ken McArdle | 3
(British Columbia) Jason Clarke | 6

Qualifier 3
(British Columbia) Jason Clarke | 2
(British Columbia) Andrew Bilesky | 7

Second Knockout
(British Columbia) Cliff Carr-Hilton | 6
(Washington (state)) Steve Birkild | 5
(British Columbia) Jody Epp | 8
(British Columbia) Mike Wood | 2

Quarterfinals
(British Columbia) Jay Tuson | 7
(British Columbia) Cliff Carr-Hilton | 1
(British Columbia) Jason Montgomery | 4
(British Columbia) Jody Epp | 10

Semifinals
(British Columbia) Jay Tuson | 7
(British Columbia) Jody Epp | 6

Qualifier 4
(British Columbia) Jay Tuson | 4
(British Columbia) Neil Dangerfield | 7

==== C event ====
Third Knockout
(British Columbia) Mike Wood | 5
(British Columbia) Steve Waatainen | 3
(Washington (state)) Steve Birkild | 4
(British Columbia) Wes Craig | 6

Quarterfinals
(British Columbia) Mike Wood | 7
(British Columbia) Wes Craig | 2

Semifinals
(British Columbia) Jody Epp | 0
(British Columbia) Mike Wood | 6

Qualifier 5
(British Columbia) Jason Clarke | 1
(British Columbia) Mike Wood | 4

Third Knockout
(British Columbia) Tyler Klymchuk | 9
(British Columbia) Cliff Carr-Hilton | 3

Quarterfinals
(British Columbia) Tyler Klymchuk | 3
(British Columbia) Jason Montgomery | 8

Semifinals
(British Columbia) Ken McArdle | 3
(British Columbia) Jason Montgomery | 5

Qualifier 6
(British Columbia) Jay Tuson | 4
(British Columbia) Jason Montgomery | 8

=== Playoffs ===
The playoffs draw is listed as follows:

Quarterfinals
(British Columbia) Andrew Bilesky | 8
(British Columbia) Jason Montgomery | 5
(British Columbia) Neil Dangerfield | 8
(British Columbia) Mike Wood | 4

Semifinals
(British Columbia) Jay Wakefield | 6
(British Columbia) Andrew Bilesky | 1
(Washington (state)) Brady Clark | 4
(British Columbia) Neil Dangerfield | 5

Final
(British Columbia) Jay Wakefield | 9
(British Columbia) Neil Dangerfield | 2

== Women ==
=== Teams ===
The teams are listed as follows:

| Skip | Third | Second | Lead | Locale |
|---|---|---|---|---|
| Sarah Wark (fourth) | Nicole Backe (skip) | Kesa Van Osch | Janelle Erwin | Nanaimo, British Columbia |
| Dezaray Hawes | Gabrielle Plonka | Ali Renwick | Caitlin Campbell | New Westminster, British Columbia |
| Heather Jensen | Shana Snell | Heather Rogers | Carly Quigley | Airdrie, Alberta |
| Sarah Koltun | Chelsea Duncan | Patty Wallingham | Jenna Duncan | Whitehorse, Yukon |
| Roberta Kuhn | Karla Thompson | Michelle Ramsay | Christen Wilson | Vernon, British Columbia |
| Lindsay Makichuk | Amy Janko | Jessica Monk | Kristina Hadden | Edmonton, Alberta |
| Marla Mallett | Kelly Shimizu | Shannon Ward | Barb Zbeetnoff | Cloverdale, British Columbia |
| Nicole Montgomery | Kayte Gyles | Megan Montgomery | Cynthia Parton | New Westminster, British Columbia |
| Lynn Noble | | | | Victoria, British Columbia |
| Ayumi Ogasawara | Yumie Funayama | Kaho Onodera | Michiko Tomabechi | Sapporo, Japan |
| Stephanie Prinse | Merit Thorson | Casey Freeman | Amanda Tipper | Chilliwack, British Columbia |
| Marilou Richter | Darah Provencal | Jessie Sanderson | Sandra Comadina | New Westminster, British Columbia |
| Penny Shantz | Sandra Jenkins | Kate Horne | Sherry Heath | Vernon, British Columbia |
| Adina Tasaka | Rachelle Kallechy | Lindsae Page | Kelsi Jones | New Westminster, British Columbia |
| Brandi Tinkler | Ashley Nordin | Alexandra Nash-McLeod | | Victoria, British Columbia |
| Kalia Van Osch | Marika Van Osch | Brooklyn Leitch | Carly Sandwith | Victoria, British Columbia |

=== Knockout results ===
The draw is listed as follows:

==== A event ====
| First Knockout | | Semifinals | | Qualifier 1 |
| (British Columbia) Nicole Backe | 7 |
| (British Columbia) Penny Shantz | 3 | (British Columbia) Nicole Backe | 7 |
| (Alberta) Heather Jensen | 6 | (Alberta) Heather Jensen | 5 |
| (British Columbia) Dezaray Hawes | 0 | | | (British Columbia) Nicole Backe | 6 |
| (British Columbia) Roberta Kuhn | 0 | | | (Japan) Ayumi Ogasawara | 10 |
| (British Columbia) Kalia Van Osch | 7 | (British Columbia) Kalia Van Osch | 4 |
| (Alberta) Lindsay Makichuk | 2 | (Japan) Ayumi Ogasawara | 5 |
| (Japan) Ayumi Ogasawara | 9 |

| First Knockout | | Semifinals | | Qualifier 2 |
| (British Columbia) Marilou Richter | 3 |
| (British Columbia) Nicole Montgomery | 7 | (British Columbia) Nicole Montgomery | 1 |
| (British Columbia) Adina Tasaka | 8 | (British Columbia) Adina Tasaka | 7 |
| (British Columbia) Stephanie Prinse | 7 | | | (British Columbia) Adina Tasaka | 2 |
| (Yukon) Sarah Koltun | 4 | | | (British Columbia) Marla Mallett | 8 |
| (British Columbia) Brandi Tinkler | 6 | (British Columbia) Brandi Tinkler | 2 |
| (British Columbia) Marla Mallett | 8 | (British Columbia) Marla Mallett | 6 |
| (British Columbia) Lynn Noble | 6 |

==== B event ====
Second Knockout
(British Columbia) Penny Shantz | 2
(British Columbia) Dezaray Hawes | 6
(British Columbia) Roberta Kuhn | 10
(Alberta) Lindsay Makichuk | 4

Quarterfinals
(British Columbia) Nicole Montgomery | 7
(British Columbia) Dezaray Hawes | 2
(British Columbia) Brandi Tinkler | 7
(British Columbia) Roberta Kuhn | 4

Semifinals
(British Columbia) Nicole Montgomery | 5
(British Columbia) Brandi Tinkler | 6

Qualifier 3
(British Columbia) Brandi Tinkler | 4
(British Columbia) Nicole Backe | 10

Second Knockout
(British Columbia) Marilou Richter | 10
(British Columbia) Stephanie Prinse | 2
(Yukon) Sarah Koltun | 2
(British Columbia) Lynne Noble | 9

Quarterfinals
(Alberta) Heather Jensen | 4
(British Columbia) Marilou Richter | 5
(British Columbia) Kalia Van Osch | 5
(British Columbia) Lynne Noble | 8

Semifinals
(British Columbia) Marilou Richter | 5
(British Columbia) Lynne Noble | 3

Qualifier 4
(British Columbia) Marilou Richter | 8
(British Columbia) Adina Tasaka | 3

==== C event ====
Third Knockout
(Yukon) Sarah Koltun | 5
(British Columbia) Dezaray Hawes | 4
(British Columbia) Stephanie Prinse | 3
(British Columbia) Roberta Kuhn | 8

Quarterfinals
(Yukon) Sarah Koltun | 3
(British Columbia) Roberta Kuhn | 11

Semifinals
(British Columbia) Lynne Noble | 2
(British Columbia) Roberta Kuhn | 9

Qualifier 5
(British Columbia) Brandi Tinkler | 4
(British Columbia) Roberta Kuhn | 5

Third Knockout
(Alberta) Lindsay Makichuk | 1
(Alberta) Heather Jensen | 8
(British Columbia) Penny Shantz | 8
(British Columbia) Kalia Van Osch | 3

Quarterfinals
(Alberta) Heather Jensen | 9
(British Columbia) Penny Shantz | 5

Semifinals
(British Columbia) Nicole Montgomery | 1
(Alberta) Heather Jensen | 7

Qualifier 6
(British Columbia) Adina Tasaka | 1
(Alberta) Heather Jensen | 5

=== Playoffs ===
The playoffs draw is listed as follows:

Quarterfinals
(British Columbia) Nicole Backe | 4
(Alberta) Heather Jensen | 9
(British Columbia) Marilou Richter | 3
(British Columbia) Roberta Kuhn | 4

Semifinals
(British Columbia) Marla Mallett | 2
(Alberta) Heather Jensen | 7
(Japan) Ayumi Ogasawara | 0
(British Columbia) Roberta Kuhn | 6

Final
(Alberta) Heather Jensen | 3
(British Columbia) Roberta Kuhn | 5
