= 2011 Vancouver Island Shootout =

World Curling Tour event

- Host city: Victoria, British Columbia
- Arena: Juan de Fuca Curling Club
- Dates: November 11–13
- Men's winner: (British Columbia) Bryan Miki
- Curling club: Royal City Curling Club, New Westminster, British Columbia
- Skip: Bryan Miki
- Third: Dean Joanisse
- Second: Tyler Klitch
- Lead: Jay Batch
- Finalist: (Alberta) Jamie King
- Women's winner: (British Columbia) Roselyn Craig
- Skip: Roselyn Craig
- Fourth: Sarah Wark
- Third: Michelle Allen
- Lead: Megan Reid
- Finalist: (Japan) Ayumi Ogasawara

The 2011 Vancouver Island Shootout was held from November 11 to 13 at the Juan de Fuca Curling Club in Victoria, British Columbia as part of the 2011–12 World Curling Tour. The purses for the men's and women's events will be CAD$10,500 and CAD$10,000, respectively.

== Men ==
=== Teams ===
| Skip | Third | Second | Lead | Locale |
|---|---|---|---|---|
| Andrew Bilesky | Stephen Kopf | Derek Errington | Aaron Watson | New Westminster, British Columbia |
| Jason Clarke | Ken Miscovitch | Tyler Jones | Geeg Renton | Victoria, British Columbia |
| Rich Cohen | John Coombs | Darwin Tyacke | TBA | Victoria, British Columbia |
| Wes Craig | Greg Hawkes | William Sutton | Stu Merrifield | Victoria, British Columbia |
| Neil Dangerfield | Dennis Sutton | Darren Boden | Glen Allen | Victoria, British Columbia |
| Jody Epp | Blair Cusack | James Yorke | Zac Capron | Victoria, British Columbia |
| Josh Hozack | Corey Chester | Nolan Reid | Zac Capron | Victoria, British Columbia |
| Wes Johnson | Brady Clark | Darren Lehto | Steve Lundeen | (Washington (state)) Seattle, Washington |
| Blake MacDonald (fourth) | Jamie King (skip) | Todd Brick | Sean Morris | Edmonton/Calgary, Alberta |
| Sven Michel | Claudio Pätz | Sandro Trolliet | Simon Gempeler | Adelboden, Switzerland |
| Dean Joanisse (fourth) | Tyler Klitch | Bryan Miki (skip) | Jay Batch | New Westminster, British Columbia |
| Jason Montgomery | Mike Wood | Miles Craig | William Duggan | Duncan, British Columbia |
| Sebastien Robillard | Mike Merklinger | Chris Faa | Brad Blackwell | Vancouver, British Columbia |
| Jay Tuson | Ken Tucker | Glen Jackson | Colin Mantik | Victoria, British Columbia |
| Michael Johnson (fourth) | Chris Baier | Jay Wakefield (skip) | John Cullen | New Westminster, British Columbia |
| Daniel Wenzek | Cameron de Jong | Sanjay Bowry | Thomas Thierbach | Victoria, British Columbia |

=== A Event ===
First Knockout
(Switzerland) Sven Michel | 7
(British Columbia) Sebastien Robillard | 0
(British Columbia) Wes Craig | 6
(British Columbia) Rich Cohen | 5
(Alberta) Jamie King | 7
(British Columbia) Jason Clarke | 3
(British Columbia) Jay Wakefield | 6
(British Columbia) Josh Hozack | 5

Semifinals
(Switzerland) Sven Michel | 6
(British Columbia) Wes Craig | 1
(Alberta) Jamie King | 7
(British Columbia) Jay Wakefield | 2

Qualifier 1
(Switzerland) Sven Michel | 7
(Alberta) Jamie King | 5

First Knockout
(British Columbia) Jason Montgomery | 7
(British Columbia) Jody Epp | 8
(British Columbia) Andrew Bilesky | 5
(Washington (state)) Wes Johnson | 3
(British Columbia) Bryan Miki | 6
(British Columbia) Daniel Wenzek | 9
(British Columbia) Neil Dangerfield | 8
(British Columbia) Jay Tuson | 3

Semifinals
(British Columbia) Jody Epp | 2
(British Columbia) Andrew Bilesky | 5
(British Columbia) Daniel Wenzek | 2
(British Columbia) Neil Dangerfield | 9

Qualifier 2
(British Columbia) Andrew Bilesky | 6
(British Columbia) Neil Dangerfield | 1

=== B Event ===
Second Knockout
(British Columbia) Sebastien Robillard | 10
(British Columbia) Rich Cohen | 4
(British Columbia) Jason Clarke | 4
(British Columbia) Josh Hozack | 6

Quarterfinals
(British Columbia) Jody Epp | 6
(British Columbia) Sebastien Robillard | 5
(British Columbia) Daniel Wenzek | 5
(British Columbia) Josh Hozack | 8

Semifinals
(British Columbia) Jody Epp | 8
(British Columbia) Josh Hozack | 0

Qualifier 3
(British Columbia) Jody Epp | 5
(Alberta) Jamie King | 8

Second Knockout
(British Columbia) Jason Montgomery | 5
(Washington (state)) Wes Johnson | 4
(British Columbia) Bryan Miki | '6
(British Columbia) Jay Tuson | 3

Quarterfinals
(British Columbia) Wes Craig | 5
(British Columbia) Jason Montgomery | 6
(British Columbia) Jay Wakefield | 2
(British Columbia) Bryan Miki | 7

Semifinals
(British Columbia) Jason Montgomery | 6
(British Columbia) Bryan Miki | 3

Qualifier 4
(British Columbia) Jason Montgomery | 8
(British Columbia) Neil Dangerfield | 7

=== C Event ===
| Third Knockout | | Quarterfinals | | Semifinals | | Qualifier 5 |
| | | | | (British Columbia) Bryan Miki | 9 |
| (British Columbia) Sebastien Robillard | 2 | | | (British Columbia) Jay Tuson | 7 |
| (British Columbia) Jay Tuson | 8 | (British Columbia) Jay Tuson | 5 |
| (Washington (state)) Wes Johnson | 8 | (Washington (state)) Wes Johnson | 2 |
| (British Columbia) Daniel Wenzek | 3 | | | | | (British Columbia) Bryan Miki | 7 |
| | | | | | | (British Columbia) Jody Epp | 4 |

| Third Knockout | | Quarterfinals | | Semifinals | | Qualifier 6 |
| | | | | (British Columbia) Josh Hozack | 7 |
| (British Columbia) Wes Craig | 9 | | | (British Columbia) Wes Craig | 0 |
| (British Columbia) Jason Clarke | 5 | (British Columbia) Wes Craig | 6 |
| (British Columbia) Rich Cohen | 3 | (British Columbia) Jay Wakefield | 1 |
| (British Columbia) Jay Wakefield | 8 | | | | | (British Columbia) Josh Hozack | 5 |
| | | | | | | (British Columbia) Neil Dangerfield | 6 |

=== Playoffs ===
Quarterfinals
(Alberta) Jamie King | 7
(British Columbia) Neil Dangerfield | 0
(British Columbia) Jason Montgomery | 3
(British Columbia) Bryan Miki | 5

Semifinals
(Switzerland) Sven Michel | 4
(Alberta) Jamie King | 5
(British Columbia) Andrew Bilesky | 4
(British Columbia) Bryan Miki | 5

Final
(Alberta) Jamie King | 2
(British Columbia) Bryan Miki | 10

== Women ==
=== Teams ===
| Skip | Third | Second | Lead | Locale |
|---|---|---|---|---|
| Nicole Backe | Rachelle Kallechy | Lindsae Page | Kelsi Jones | Vancouver, British Columbia |
| Cristin Clark | Emily Good | Elle LeBeau | Sharon Vukich | (Washington (state)) Seattle, Washington |
| Sarah Wark (fourth) | Michelle Allen | Roselyn Craig (skip) | Megan Reid | Duncan, British Columbia |
| Dana Ferguson | Nikki Smith | Denise Kinghorn | Cori Morris | Calgary, Alberta |
| Simone Groundwater | Laura Ball | Mallory Geier | Marla Guldbranson | British Columbia |
| Kristy Lewis | Marilou Richter | Michelle Ramsay | Sandra Comadina | Vancouver, British Columbia |
| Marla Mallett | Darah Provencal | Steph Jackson | Kelly Shimizu | New Westminster, British Columbia |
| Nicole Montgomery | Rachelle Haider | Cynthia Parton | | Maple Ridge, British Columbia |
| Lynne Noble | Lorraine Jeffries | Lorraine Gagnon | Lynn Dashkewytch | Victoria, British Columbia |
| Ayumi Ogasawara | Yumie Funayama | Kaho Onodera | Chinami Yoshida | Sapporo, Japan |
| Sheri Pickering | Cheyanne Creasser | Karen Schiml | Donna Phillips | Calgary, Alberta |
| Penny Shantz | Debbie Jones-Walker | Deb Pulak | Shirley Wong | Vancouver, British Columbia |
| Karla Thompson | Roberta Kuhn | Christen Crossley | Kristen Gentile | Kamloops, British Columbia |
| Brandi Tinkler | Ashley Nordin | Erin Bartlett | Emily Dagg | Victoria, British Columbia |
| Kesa Van Osch | Kalia Van Osch | Brooklyn Leitch | Marika Van Osch | Victoria, British Columbia |

=== Round Robin Standings ===
Key
| Teams to Playoffs |
| Teams to Tiebreakers |

| Pool A | W | L |
|---|---|---|
| (British Columbia) Nicole Backe | 4 | 0 |
| (Alberta) Sheri Pickering | 3 | 1 |
| (Washington (state)) Cristin Clark | 1 | 3 |
| (British Columbia) Kristy Lewis | 1 | 3 |
| (British Columbia) Nicole Montgomery | 1 | 3 |

| Pool B | W | L |
|---|---|---|
| (British Columbia) Roselyn Craig | 3 | 1 |
| (British Columbia) Marla Mallett | 3 | 1 |
| (British Columbia) Brandi Tinkler | 2 | 2 |
| (British Columbia) Kesa Van Osch | 1 | 3 |
| (British Columbia) Penny Shantz | 1 | 3 |

| Pool C | W | L |
|---|---|---|
| (Japan) Ayumi Ogasawara | 3 | 1 |
| (Alberta) Dana Ferguson | 3 | 1 |
| (British Columbia) Karla Thompson | 3 | 1 |
| (British Columbia) Lynne Noble | 1 | 3 |
| (British Columbia) Simone Groundwater | 0 | 4 |

=== Round Robin Results ===
==== Draw 2 ====
November 11, 12:00 PM PT

| Sheet 1 | 1 | 2 | 3 | 4 | 5 | 6 | 7 | 8 | Final |
| (British Columbia) Nicole Montgomery 🔨 | 1 | 0 | 1 | 0 | 1 | 0 | 1 | X | 4 |
| (British Columbia) Nicole Backe | 0 | 2 | 0 | 2 | 0 | 3 | 0 | X | 7 |

| Sheet 2 | 1 | 2 | 3 | 4 | 5 | 6 | 7 | 8 | Final |
| (Washington (state)) Cristin Clark 🔨 | 0 | 0 | 1 | 0 | 1 | 0 | X | X | 2 |
| (British Columbia) Kristy Lewis | 2 | 0 | 0 | 2 | 0 | 4 | X | X | 8 |

| Sheet 3 | 1 | 2 | 3 | 4 | 5 | 6 | 7 | 8 | Final |
| (British Columbia) Brandi Tinkler 🔨 | 1 | 0 | 0 | 0 | 1 | 1 | 0 | X | 3 |
| (British Columbia) Marla Mallett | 0 | 3 | 0 | 1 | 0 | 0 | 5 | X | 9 |

| Sheet 4 | 1 | 2 | 3 | 4 | 5 | 6 | 7 | 8 | Final |
| (British Columbia) Kesa Van Osch 🔨 | 1 | 0 | 1 | 0 | 0 | 1 | 0 | X | 3 |
| (British Columbia) Roselyn Craig | 0 | 4 | 0 | 0 | 3 | 0 | 2 | X | 9 |

==== Draw 3 ====
November 11, 3:00 PM PT

| Sheet 1 | 1 | 2 | 3 | 4 | 5 | 6 | 7 | 8 | Final |
| (British Columbia) Karla Thompson 🔨 | 1 | 0 | 0 | 2 | 2 | 0 | 0 | 3 | 8 |
| (Alberta) Dana Ferguson | 0 | 1 | 1 | 0 | 0 | 3 | 2 | 0 | 7 |

| Sheet 2 | 1 | 2 | 3 | 4 | 5 | 6 | 7 | 8 | Final |
| (British Columbia) Brandi Tinkler 🔨 | 1 | 2 | 0 | 1 | 0 | 0 | 1 | 1 | 6 |
| (British Columbia) Penny Shantz | 0 | 0 | 1 | 0 | 3 | 1 | 0 | 0 | 5 |

| Sheet 3 | 1 | 2 | 3 | 4 | 5 | 6 | 7 | 8 | Final |
| (British Columbia) Nicole Montgomery | 0 | 2 | 0 | 1 | 0 | 0 | 0 | 0 | 3 |
| (Alberta) Sheri Pickering 🔨 | 0 | 0 | 0 | 0 | 1 | 1 | 1 | 1 | 4 |

| Sheet 4 | 1 | 2 | 3 | 4 | 5 | 6 | 7 | 8 | Final |
| (British Columbia) Lynne Noble 🔨 | 1 | 0 | 0 | 1 | 1 | 0 | 0 | X | 3 |
| (Japan) Ayumi Ogasawara | 0 | 3 | 1 | 0 | 0 | 3 | 0 | X | 7 |

==== Draw 4 ====
November 11, 6:00 PM PT

| Sheet 1 | 1 | 2 | 3 | 4 | 5 | 6 | 7 | 8 | Final |
| (British Columbia) Marla Mallett 🔨 | 0 | 1 | 0 | 2 | 0 | 3 | 0 | X | 6 |
| (British Columbia) Kesa Van Osch | 0 | 0 | 0 | 0 | 2 | 0 | 1 | X | 3 |

| Sheet 2 | 1 | 2 | 3 | 4 | 5 | 6 | 7 | 8 | Final |
| (British Columbia) Nicole Backe 🔨 | 0 | 0 | 1 | 0 | 1 | 3 | 0 | 1 | 6 |
| (Washington (state)) Cristin Clark | 0 | 1 | 0 | 2 | 0 | 0 | 1 | 0 | 4 |

| Sheet 3 | 1 | 2 | 3 | 4 | 5 | 6 | 7 | 8 | Final |
| (British Columbia) Karla Thompson 🔨 | 2 | 0 | 3 | 0 | 1 | 1 | X | X | 7 |
| (British Columbia) Simone Groundwater | 0 | 1 | 0 | 1 | 0 | 0 | X | X | 2 |

==== Draw 5 ====
November 11, 9:00 PM PT

| Sheet 1 | 1 | 2 | 3 | 4 | 5 | 6 | 7 | 8 | Final |
| (British Columbia) Kristy Lewis | 1 | 0 | 0 | 0 | 0 | 0 | X | X | 1 |
| (Alberta) Sheri Pickering 🔨 | 0 | 0 | 2 | 2 | 1 | 1 | X | X | 6 |

| Sheet 2 | 1 | 2 | 3 | 4 | 5 | 6 | 7 | 8 | Final |
| (Alberta) Dana Ferguson | 2 | 0 | 1 | 0 | 1 | 1 | 0 | X | 5 |
| (British Columbia) Lynne Noble | 0 | 1 | 0 | 1 | 0 | 0 | 1 | X | 3 |

| Sheet 3 | 1 | 2 | 3 | 4 | 5 | 6 | 7 | 8 | Final |
| (British Columbia) Roselyn Craig 🔨 | 0 | 0 | 0 | 2 | 1 | 0 | 0 | 1 | 4 |
| (British Columbia) Penny Shantz | 1 | 1 | 1 | 0 | 0 | 1 | 1 | 0 | 5 |

| Sheet 4 | 1 | 2 | 3 | 4 | 5 | 6 | 7 | 8 | Final |
| (Japan) Ayumi Ogasawara 🔨 | 2 | 0 | 1 | 0 | 0 | 1 | 2 | X | 6 |
| (British Columbia) Simone Groundwater | 0 | 1 | 0 | 2 | 1 | 0 | 0 | X | 4 |

==== Draw 6 ====
November 12, 8:00 AM PT

| Sheet 1 | 1 | 2 | 3 | 4 | 5 | 6 | 7 | 8 | Final |
| (British Columbia) Brandi Tinkler | 0 | 1 | 0 | 1 | 0 | 1 | 0 | 3 | 6 |
| (British Columbia) Kesa Van Osch 🔨 | 1 | 0 | 1 | 0 | 1 | 0 | 0 | 0 | 3 |

| Sheet 2 | 1 | 2 | 3 | 4 | 5 | 6 | 7 | 8 | Final |
| (British Columbia) Nicole Montgomery | 0 | 0 | 1 | 0 | 0 | X | X | X | 1 |
| (Washington (state)) Cristin Clark 🔨 | 0 | 3 | 0 | 1 | 3 | X | X | X | 7 |

==== Draw 7 ====
November 12,11:00 AM PT

| Sheet 1 | 1 | 2 | 3 | 4 | 5 | 6 | 7 | 8 | Final |
| (British Columbia) Marla Mallett | 0 | 0 | 0 | 1 | 0 | 1 | 1 | X | 3 |
| (British Columbia) Roselyn Craig 🔨 | 2 | 0 | 0 | 0 | 2 | 0 | 0 | X | 4 |

| Sheet 2 | 1 | 2 | 3 | 4 | 5 | 6 | 7 | 8 | Final |
| (British Columbia) Karla Thompson | 0 | 1 | 0 | 1 | 0 | 0 | 3 | 1 | 6 |
| (British Columbia) Lynne Noble 🔨 | 1 | 0 | 1 | 0 | 2 | 0 | 0 | 0 | 4 |

| Sheet 3 | 1 | 2 | 3 | 4 | 5 | 6 | 7 | 8 | Final |
| (Alberta) Dana Ferguson | 1 | 0 | 0 | 3 | 0 | 2 | 0 | X | 6 |
| (Japan) Ayumi Ogasawara 🔨 | 0 | 0 | 1 | 0 | 2 | 0 | 1 | X | 4 |

| Sheet 4 | 1 | 2 | 3 | 4 | 5 | 6 | 7 | 8 | 9 | Final |
| (British Columbia) Nicole Backe 🔨 | 1 | 0 | 0 | 2 | 0 | 3 | 1 | 0 | 2 | 9 |
| (British Columbia) Kristy Lewis | 0 | 2 | 2 | 0 | 2 | 0 | 0 | 1 | 0 | 7 |

==== Draw 8 ====
November 12, 3:00 PM PT

| Sheet 1 | 1 | 2 | 3 | 4 | 5 | 6 | 7 | 8 | Final |
| (Alberta) Dana Ferguson 🔨 | 1 | 0 | 0 | 2 | 0 | 0 | 3 | X | 6 |
| (British Columbia) Simone Groundwater | 0 | 0 | 1 | 0 | 1 | 2 | 0 | 0 | 4 |

| Sheet 2 | 1 | 2 | 3 | 4 | 5 | 6 | 7 | 8 | Final |
| (British Columbia) Nicole Backe 🔨 | 2 | 0 | 0 | 3 | 0 | 0 | 5 | X | 10 |
| (Alberta) Sheri Pickering | 0 | 1 | 0 | 0 | 1 | 1 | 0 | X | 3 |

| Sheet 3 | 1 | 2 | 3 | 4 | 5 | 6 | 7 | 8 | Final |
| (British Columbia) Marla Mallett 🔨 | 0 | 0 | 2 | 1 | 0 | 3 | X | X | 6 |
| (British Columbia) Penny Shantz | 0 | 0 | 0 | 0 | 1 | 0 | X | X | 1 |

| Sheet 4 | 1 | 2 | 3 | 4 | 5 | 6 | 7 | 8 | Final |
| (British Columbia) Nicole Montgomery | 0 | 2 | 0 | 0 | 1 | 1 | 0 | 1 | 5 |
| (British Columbia) Kristy Lewis 🔨 | 0 | 0 | 1 | 1 | 0 | 0 | 1 | 0 | 3 |

| Sheet 5 | 1 | 2 | 3 | 4 | 5 | 6 | 7 | 8 | Final |
| (British Columbia) Brandi Tinkler | 0 | 1 | 0 | 1 | 0 | 1 | 0 | X | 3 |
| (British Columbia) Roselyn Craig 🔨 | 1 | 0 | 1 | 0 | 3 | 0 | 1 | X | 6 |

| Sheet 6 | 1 | 2 | 3 | 4 | 5 | 6 | 7 | 8 | Final |
| (British Columbia) Karla Thompson | 0 | 1 | 0 | 0 | 0 | 2 | 0 | X | 3 |
| (Japan) Ayumi Ogasawara 🔨 | 2 | 0 | 2 | 2 | 0 | 0 | 1 | X | 7 |

=== Tiebreaker ===
November 12, 9:00 PM PT

| Sheet 1 | 1 | 2 | 3 | 4 | 5 | 6 | 7 | 8 | Final |
| (British Columbia) Karla Thompson | 0 | 1 | 2 | 0 | 0 | 1 | 0 | X | 4 |
| (Alberta) Dana Ferguson 🔨 | 2 | 0 | 0 | 1 | 2 | 0 | 2 | X | 7 |

=== Playoffs ===
Quarterfinals
(British Columbia) Roselyn Craig | 6
(Alberta) Dana Ferguson | 4
(Alberta) Sheri Pickering | 5
(British Columbia) Marla Mallett | 2

Semifinals
(British Columbia) Nicole Backe | 6
(British Columbia) Roselyn Craig | 8
(Japan) Ayumi Ogasawara | 4
(Alberta) Sheri Pickering | 3

Final
(British Columbia) Roselyn Craig | 8
(Japan) Ayumi Ogasawara | 6
