= 2011 Challenge Casino de Charlevoix =

- Host city: Clermont, Québec
- Arena: Aréna de Clermont
- Dates: November 24–27
- Men's winner: (Prince Edward Island) Brett Gallant
- Curling club: Charlottetown, Prince Edward Island
- Skip: Brett Gallant
- Third: Eddie MacKenzie
- Second: Anson Carmody
- Lead: Alex MacFadyen
- Finalist: (Newfoundland and Labrador) Brad Gushue

The 2011 Challenge Casino de Charlevoix was held from November 24 to 27 at the Aréna de Clermont in Clermont, Québec as part of the 2011–12 World Curling Tour. The purse for the event was CAD$37,000,and the winner, Brett Gallant, received CAD$12,000. The event was held in a triple-knockout format.

== Teams ==
Skip	Third	Second	Lead	Locale
Matthew Blandford	Tom Sallows	Mike Westlund	Chris Sanford	Cold Lake, Alberta
Serge Reid (fourth)	Francois Gionest	Simon Collin	Pierre Charette (skip)	Saguenay, Quebec
Benoit Schwarz (fourth)	Peter de Cruz (skip)	Gilles Vuille	Valentin Tanner	Switzerland
Robert Desjardins	Jean-Sébastien Roy	Steven Munroe	Steeve Villeneuve	Chicoutimi, Quebec
John Epping	Scott Bailey	Scott Howard	David Mathers	Toronto, Ontario
Martin Ferland	Francois Roberge	Shawn Fowler	Maxime Elmaleh	Quebec City, Quebec
Ian Fitzner-Leblanc	Paul Flemming	Robbie Doherty	Kelly Mittelstadt	Halifax, Nova Scotia
Mike Fournier	Dwayne Fowler	Simon Lejour	Yannick Lejour	Montreal, Quebec
Brett Gallant	Eddie MacKenzie	Anson Carmody	Alex MacFadyen	Charlottetown, Prince Edward Island
Brad Gushue	Ryan Fry	Geoff Walker	Adam Casey	St. John's, Newfoundland and Labrador
Guy Hemmings	François Gagné	Benoit Vezeau	Christian Bouchard	Mount Royal, Quebec
Philippe Lemay	Mathieu Beaufort	Jean-Michel Arsenault	Erik Lachance	Trois-Rivières, Quebec
Steve Lodge	Rob Bushfield	Ian Soutar	Nate Etherington	Brockville, Ontario
Brent MacDougall	Lee Buott	Sean Audas	Neil Gallant	Halifax, Nova Scotia
Mike McEwen	B. J. Neufeld	Matt Wozniak	Denni Neufeld	Winnipeg, Manitoba
Jean-Michel Ménard	Martin Crête	Éric Sylvain	Philippe Ménard	Gatineau/Lévis, Quebec
Jamie Murphy	Jordan Pinder	Mike Bardsley	Don McDermaid	Halifax, Nova Scotia
Dan Petryk (fourth)	Steve Petryk (skip)	Colin Hodgson	Brad Chyz	Calgary, Alberta
Chad Stevens	Graham Breckon	Scott Saccary	Kevin Saccary	Dartmouth/Chester, Nova Scotia
Don Westphal	Simon Dupuis	Louis Biron	Maurice Cayouette	Thurso, Quebec

== Knockout results ==
=== A event ===
First Knockout
(Prince Edward Island) Brett Gallant	5
(Quebec) Don Westphal	4
(Nova Scotia) Chad Stevens	6
(Nova Scotia) Brent MacDougall	7

Quarterfinals
(Manitoba) Mike McEwen	8
(Prince Edward Island) Brett Gallant	6
(Switzerland) Peter de Cruz	5
(Quebec) Robert Desjardins	9
(Quebec) Jean-Michel Ménard	7
(Nova Scotia) Brent MacDougall	1
(Alberta) Steve Petryk	3
(Quebec) Mike Fournier	9

Semifinals
(Manitoba) Mike McEwen	7
(Quebec) Robert Desjardins	5
(Quebec) Jean-Michel Ménard	6
(Quebec) Mike Fournier	2

Qualifier 1
(Manitoba) Mike McEwen	3
(Quebec) Jean-Michel Ménard	8

First Knockout
(Nova Scotia) Jaime Murphy	6
(Alberta) Matthew Blandford	0
(Nova Scotia) Ian Fitzner-Leblanc	6
(Ontario) Steve Lodge	5

Quarterfinals
(Ontario) John Epping	8
(Nova Scotia) Jaime Murphy	7
(Quebec) Martin Ferland	8
(Quebec) Guy Hemmings	4
(Newfoundland and Labrador) Brad Gushue	6
(Nova Scotia) Ian Fitzner-Leblanc	0
(Quebec) Pierre Charette	8
(Quebec) Philippe Lemay	5

Semifinals
(Ontario) John Epping	6
(Quebec) Martin Ferland	7
(Newfoundland and Labrador) Brad Gushue	1
(Quebec) Pierre Charette	7

Qualifier 2
(Quebec) Martin Ferland	4
(Quebec) Pierre Charette	3

=== B event ===
Second Knockout
(Switzerland) Peter de Cruz	6
(Quebec) Don Westphal	3
(Alberta) Steve Petryk	4
(Nova Scotia) Chad Stevens	7

Quarterfinals
(Nova Scotia) Brent MacDougall	4
(Switzerland) Peter de Cruz	7
(Prince Edward Island) Brett Gallant	5
(Nova Scotia) Chad Stevens	4

Semifinals
(Switzerland) Peter de Cruz	5
(Prince Edward Island) Brett Gallant	0

Qualifier 3
(Switzerland) Peter de Cruz	6
(Quebec) Pierre Charette	5

Second Knockout
(Quebec) Guy Hemmings	6
(Alberta) Matthew Blandford	7
(Quebec) Philippe Lemay	7
(Ontario) Steve Lodge	3

Quarterfinals
(Nova Scotia) Ian Fitzner-Leblanc	4
(Alberta) Matthew Blandford	0
(Nova Scotia) Jaime Murphy	4
(Quebec) Philippe Lemay	7

Semifinals
(Nova Scotia) Ian Fitzner-Leblanc	6
(Quebec) Philippe Lemay	4

Qualifier 4
(Nova Scotia) Ian Fitzner-Leblanc	5
(Manitoba) Mike McEwen	3

Second Knockout		Qualifier 5
(Quebec) Robert Desjardins	7
(Quebec) Mike Fournier	6	(Quebec) Robert Desjardins	4
(Ontario) John Epping	1	(Newfoundland and Labrador) Brad Gushue	7
(Newfoundland and Labrador) Brad Gushue	6

=== C event ===
Third Knockout		Semifinals		Qualifier 6
(Nova Scotia) Brent MacDougall	7
(Nova Scotia) Chad Stevens	1	(Nova Scotia) Brent MacDougall	2
		(Ontario) John Epping	7
				(Ontario) John Epping	5
				(Manitoba) Mike McEwen	8

Third Knockout		Semifinals		Qualifier 7
(Alberta) Matthew Blandford	3
(Nova Scotia) Jaime Murphy	7	(Nova Scotia) Jaime Murphy	6
		(Quebec) Mike Fournier	7
				(Quebec) Mike Fournier	3
				(Quebec) Pierre Charette	8

Third Knockout
(Quebec) Don Westphal	8
(Alberta) Steve Petryk	3
(Quebec) Guy Hemmings	5
(Ontario) Steve Lodge	'7

Quarterfinals
(Quebec) Philippe Lemay	8
(Quebec) Don Westphal	7
(Prince Edward Island) Brett Gallant	6
(Ontario) Steve Lodge	1

Semifinals
(Quebec) Philippe Lemay	6
(Prince Edward Island) Brett Gallant	7

Qualifier 8
(Prince Edward Island) Brett Gallant	8
(Quebec) Robert Desjardins	3

== Playoffs ==
Quarterfinals
(Quebec) Jean-Michel Ménard	6
(Quebec) Pierre Charette	8
(Switzerland) Peter de Cruz	1
(Prince Edward Island) Brett Gallant	7
(Quebec) Martin Ferland	4
(Manitoba) Mike McEwen	9
(Nova Scotia) Ian Fitzner-Leblanc	3
(Newfoundland and Labrador) Brad Gushue	5

Semifinals
(Quebec) Pierre Charette	4
(Prince Edward Island) Brett Gallant	10
(Manitoba) Mike McEwen	3
(Newfoundland and Labrador) Brad Gushue	8

Final
(Prince Edward Island) Brett Gallant	5
(Newfoundland and Labrador) Brad Gushue	4
