= 2011 Manitoba Lotteries Men's Curling Classic =

- Host city: Brandon, Manitoba
- Arena: Brandon Curling Club
- Dates: October 7–10
- Winner: (China) Liu Rui
- Curling club: Harbin, China
- Skip: Liu Rui
- Third: Zang Jialiang
- Second: Xu Xiaoming
- Lead: Ba Dexin
- Finalist: (Manitoba) Rob Fowler

The 2011 Manitoba Lotteries Men's Curling Classic was held from October 7 to 10 at the Brandon Curling Club in Brandon, Manitoba as part of the 2011–12 World Curling Tour. The purse for the event was CAD$40,000. The event was played in a triple knockout format.

== Teams ==
Skip	Third	Second	Lead	Locale
Todd Birr	Greg Romaniuk	Doug Pottinger	Tom O'Connor	Mankato, Minnesota
David Bohn	Andrew Irving	Dennis Bohn	Larry Solomon	Winnipeg, Manitoba
Brendan Bottcher	Bradley Thiessen	Micky Lizmore	Karrick Martin	Edmonton, Alberta
Pete Fenson	Shawn Rojeski	Joe Polo	Ryan Brunt	Bemidji, Minnesota
Perry Fisher	Kevin Cullen	Brett McGregor	Sean Martin	Nesbitt, Manitoba
Rob Fowler	Allan Lyburn	Richard Daneault	Derek Samagalski	Brandon, Manitoba
Chris Galbraith	Travis Bale	Bryan Galbraith	Rodney Legault	Winnipeg, Manitoba
Liu Rui	Xu Xiaoming	Zang Jialiang	Ba Dexin	Harbin, China
William Lyburn	James Kirkness	Alex Forrest	Tyler Forrest	Winnipeg, Manitoba
Kelly Marnoch	Tyler Waterhouse	Travis Brooks	Chris Cameron	Carberry, Manitoba
Darrell McKee	Clint Dieno	Jason Jacobson	Brock Montgomery	Saskatoon, Saskatchewan
Terry McNamee	Steve Irwin	Geordie Hargreaves	Travis Saban	Brandon, Manitoba
Daley Peters (fourth)	Vic Peters (skip)	Brendan Taylor	Kyle Werenich	Winnipeg, Manitoba
Kelly Skinner	Allan Lawn	Greg Rabe	Mike Marshall	Brandon, Manitoba
Shawn Taylor	Travis Taylor	Branden Jorgenson		Brandon, Manitoba

== Results ==
=== A Event ===
First Knockout		Semifinals		Qualifier 1
		(Manitoba) Rob Fowler	6
(Manitoba) William Lyburn	1	(Alberta) Brendan Bottcher	2
(Alberta) Brendan Bottcher	5			(Manitoba) Rob Fowler	7
(Manitoba) Vic Peters	5			(Manitoba) Vic Peters	5
(Manitoba) Shawn Taylor	4	(Manitoba) Vic Peters	4
(Minnesota) Todd Birr	4	(Manitoba) Kelly Marnoch	2
(Manitoba) Kelly Marnoch	7

First Knockout		Semifinals		Qualifier 2
(Minnesota) Pete Fenson	5
(Manitoba) Kelly Skinner	6	(Manitoba) Kelly Skinner	5
(Manitoba) Chris Galbraith	3	(Manitoba) Terry McNamee	6
(Manitoba) Terry McNamee	4			(Manitoba) Terry McNamee	4
(China) Liu Rui	6			(China) Liu Rui	9
(Manitoba) Perry Fisher	2	(China) Liu Rui	9
(Manitoba) David Bohn	6	(Manitoba) David Bohn	2
(Saskatchewan) Darrell McKee	0

=== B Event ===
Second Knockout		Semifinals		Qualifier 3
		(Manitoba) William Lyburn	3
(Manitoba) Shawn Taylor	2	(Minnesota) Todd Birr	7
(Minnesota) Todd Birr	6			(Minnesota) Todd Birr	6
				(Manitoba) Terry McNamee	4

Second Knockout		Semifinals		Qualifier 4
(Minnesota) Pete Fenson	6
(Manitoba) Chris Galbraith	2	(Minnesota) Pete Fenson	4
(Manitoba) Perry Fisher	3	(Saskatchewan) Darrell McKee	8
(Saskatchewan) Darrell McKee	4			(Saskatchewan) Darrell McKee	3
				(Manitoba) Vic Peters	7

Second Knockout		Qualifier 5
(Alberta) Brendan Bottcher	6
(Manitoba) Kelly Marnoch	2	(Alberta) Brendan Bottcher	3
(Manitoba) Kelly Skinner	5	(Manitoba) Kelly Skinner	5
(Manitoba) David Bohn	4

=== C Event ===
Third Knockout		Qualifier 6
(Manitoba) Shawn Taylor	2
(Manitoba) David Bohn	6	(Manitoba) David Bohn	5
		(Alberta) Brendan Bottcher	7

Third Knockout		Semifinals		Qualifier 7
(Manitoba) Chris Galbraith	7
(Manitoba) Perry Fisher	0	(Manitoba) Chris Galbraith	5
		(Manitoba) Kelly Marnoch	3
				(Manitoba) Chris Galbraith	3
				(Saskatchewan) Darrell McKee	6

Third Knockout		Qualifier 8
(Manitoba) William Lyburn	5
(Minnesota) Pete Fenson	6	(Minnesota) Pete Fenson	2
		(Manitoba) Terry McNamee	6

== Playoffs ==
Quarterfinals
(Manitoba) Rob Fowler	7
(Saskatchewan) Darrell McKee	5
(Manitoba) Terry McNamee	3
(Manitoba) Vic Peters	5
(Minnesota) Todd Birr	7
(Manitoba) Kelly Skinner	5
(Alberta) Brendan Bottcher	2
(China) Liu Rui	6

Semifinals
(Manitoba) Rob Fowler	6
(Manitoba) Vic Peters	2
(Minnesota) Todd Birr	5
(China) Liu Rui	6

Final
(Manitoba) Rob Fowler	4
(China) Liu Rui	5
