= Karuizawa International Curling Championships =

Curling competition

- Organizer: Sports Community Karuizawa Club
- Established: 1999; 27 years ago
- Host city: Karuizawa, Japan
- Arena: Karuizawa Ice Park
- Website: karuizawa-icurling.jp
- Men's purse: ¥ 1,500,000
- Women's purse: ¥ 1,500,000

Current champions (2026)
- Men: (Nagano Prefecture) Tsuyoshi Yamaguchi
- Women: (Sweden) Isabella Wranå

Current edition
- 2026 Karuizawa International Curling Championships

The Karuizawa International Curling Championships is a curling bonspiel held annually since the Olympic Games in Nagano at the SCAP Karuizawa Arena in Kariuzawa, Japan. The bonspiel is held to commemorate the curling event at the 1998 Nagano Olympics, the first official curling event in the Olympic programme since the 1924 Winter Olympics. It is also held to help promote curling throughout Japan. The event was part of the World Curling Tour from 2014 to 2019.

== Format ==
=== Current format ===
A total of 16 teams (8 men's and 8 women's teams) are invited each year to participate in the championship. The teams play a two-pool round robin tournament with games of eight ends, and the top two teams in each pool advancing to the playoff round.

=== Previous format ===
Prior to 2013, a total of 16 teams (8 men's and 8 women's teams) were invited each year to participate in the championship. Five teams of each gender were chosen from foreign nations based on performances at the most recent World Curling Championships, while three teams were chosen from within Japan. The teams were chosen as follows:

Men's	Women's
5 Foreign Teams
Japan National Team
Japan Selection Team (Note: Selection teams recommended by Japan Curling Association)
Nagano Selection Team

The eight teams of each gender played a round robin tournament with games of eight ends, and the top four teams of each gender played ten-end games in the final round.

== Champions (1999-2009) ==
Year	Men's winner	Women's winner
1999	(Canada) Bob Turcotte	(Canada) Cathy Borst
2000	(Japan) Makoto Tsuruga	(Canada) Sherry Fraser
2001	(Finland) Markku Uusipaavalniemi	(Canada) Nancy Smith
2002	(Canada) Greg Monkman	(Sweden) Margaretha Lindahl
2003	(United States) Paul Pustovar	(Switzerland) Manuela Kormann
2004	(Canada) Brian Gessner	(Canada) Cheryl Bernard
2005	(Canada) Pat Simmons	(Japan) Moe Meguro
2006	(Canada) Ryan Fry	(Canada) Crystal Rumberg
2007	(United States) Craig Disher	(Canada) Jo-Ann Rizzo
2008	(Canada) Joel Jordison	(Japan) Yukako Tsuchiya
2009	(Canada) Bob Ursel	(Switzerland) Manuela Kormann

== Past Champions (since 2010) ==
Year	Winning skip	Runner-up skip
2010	Canada (Chris Busby)	Japan (Yusuke Morozumi)
2010	Canada (Hollie Nicol)	Sweden (Stina Viktorsson)
2011	Japan (Yusuke Morozumi)	United States (Tyler George)
2011	Canada (Jennifer Jones)	Japan (Satsuki Fujisawa)
2012	Japan Selection (Yusuke Morozumi)	Canada (Colin Thomas)
2012	Canada (Laura Crocker)	Switzerland (Silvana Tirinzoni)
2013	(South Korea) Kim Chang-min	(Nagano Prefecture) Yusuke Morozumi
2013	(Switzerland) Binia Feltscher-Beeli	(Nagano Prefecture) Ayumi Ogasawara
2014	(Canada) Kevin Koe	(South Korea) Seong Se-hyeon
2014	(Canada) Jennifer Jones	(South Korea) Kim Eun-jung
2015	(Scotland) David Murdoch	(Canada) Pat Simmons
2015	(Hokkaido) Ayumi Ogasawara	(Hokkaido) Satsuki Fujisawa
2016	(Scotland) Tom Brewster	(Scotland) David Murdoch
2016	(South Korea) Gim Un-chi	(Sweden) Margaretha Sigfridsson
2017	(Nagano Prefecture) Yusuke Morozumi	(South Korea) Kim Chang-min
2017	(Hokkaido) Satsuki Fujisawa	(Nagano Prefecture) Chiaki Matsumura
2018	(Canada) Reid Carruthers	(Hokkaido) Yuta Matsumura
2018	(Russia) Anna Sidorova	(Hokkaido) Sayaka Yoshimura
2019	(Hokkaido) Yuta Matsumura	(Sweden) Niklas Edin
2019	(Russia) Anna Sidorova	(Hokkaido) Satsuki Fujisawa
2020–2021	Cancelled	
2022	Riku Yanagisawa	Yusuke Morozumi
2022	(South Korea) Kim Eun-jung	(Canada) Kerri Einarson
2023	(Canada) Brad Gushue	(Hokkaido) Hayato Sato
2023	(Nagano Prefecture) Ikue Kitazawa	(South Korea) Kim Eun-jung
2024	(Germany) Marc Muskatewitz	(Nagano Prefecture) Tsuyoshi Yamaguchi
2024	(Hokkaido) Sayaka Yoshimura	(Sweden) Anna Hasselborg
2026 (Mar.)	(Hokkaido) Shinya Abe	(Norway) Magnus Ramsfjell
2026 (Mar.)	(Sweden) Anna Hasselborg	(Nagano Prefecture) Ikue Kitazawa
2026 (Sept.)	(Nagano Prefecture) Tsuyoshi Yamaguchi	(Hokkaido) Takumi Maeda
2026 (Sept.)	(Sweden) Isabella Wranå	(South Korea) Kim Kyeong-ae
