= Manitoba Lotteries Men's Curling Classic =

The Manitoba Lotteries Men's Curling Classic was an annual bonspiel, or curling tournament, that took place at the Brandon Curling Club in Brandon, Manitoba. The tournament was held in a triple-knockout format. The tournament, started in 1998 as part of the World Curling Tour and was held until 2011. Curlers from Manitoba dominated the event. The event was cancelled in 2012.

== Past champions ==
Only skip's name is displayed.

Year	Winning team	Runner up team	Purse (CAD)
2002	(Alberta) Shane Park		
2003	(Manitoba) Jeff Stoughton		
2004	(Manitoba) Allan Lyburn		
2005	(Manitoba) Jeff Stoughton		
2008	(Manitoba) Jeff Stoughton	(Saskatchewan) Joel Jordison	
2009	(Manitoba) Jeff Stoughton	(Manitoba) David Bohn	
2010	(Saskatchewan) Scott Bitz	(Manitoba) Vic Peters	$31,000
2011	(China) Liu Rui	(Manitoba) Rob Fowler	$45,000
