= 2011 Karuizawa International Curling Championship =

- Host city: Karuizawa, Nagano
- Arena: SCAP Karuizawa Arena
- Dates: January 26–30
- Men's winner: Japan
- Skip: Yusuke Morozumi
- Third: Tsuyoshi Yamaguchi
- Second: Tetsuro Shimizu
- Lead: Kosuke Morozumi
- Finalist: United States
- Women's winner: Canada
- Skip: Jennifer Jones
- Third: Kaitlyn Lawes
- Second: Jill Officer
- Lead: Dawn Askin
- Finalist: Japan

The 2011 Karuizawa International Curling Championship was held from January 26–30 at the SCAP Karuizawa Arena in Karuizawa, Japan. The bonspiel featured eight men's and women's teams (five foreign teams and three Japanese teams) playing in a round robin format. The top four teams of each gender played in a single-elimination round to determine the winners.

== Men's ==
=== Teams ===
	Regions	Skip	Third	Second	Lead	Alternate
Foreign; Berths	Canada	Ted Appelman	Tom Appelman	Brendan Melnyk	Brandon Klassen	Adam Enright
Foreign; Berths	Norway	Joakim Suther	Henrik Holth	Jan Erik Hansen	Eirik Kristensen	
Foreign; Berths	United States	Tyler George	Christopher Plys	Rich Ruohonen	Phill Drobnick	
Foreign; Berths	South Korea	Lee Dong-keun	Kim Soo-hyuk	Kim Tae-hwan	Nam Yoon-hoo	
Foreign; Berths	China	Ji Yansong	Chen Lu'an	Li Guangxu	Liang Shuming	
Japanese; Berths	Japan National Team	Yusuke Morozumi	Tsuyoshi Yamaguchi	Tetsuro Shimizu	Kosuke Morozumi	
Japanese; Berths	Japan Selection Team	Hiroshi Tsuruga	Yuki Hayashi	Tsuyoshi Wakabayashi	Eiji Obata	Masatoshi Fukuoka
Japanese; Berths	(Japan) Nagano Selection Team	Nagao Tsuchiya	Yoshiike Yamato	Keita Sato	Yuichi Kajiwara	Motoaki Kimoto

=== Standings ===
Region	Skip	W	L
Canada	Ted Appelman	6	1
South Korea	Lee Dong-keun	6	1
United States	Tyler George	5	2
Japan	Yusuke Morozumi	4	3
Japan Selection	Hiroshi Tsuruga	3	4
China	Ji Yansong	2	5
(Japan) Nagano Selection	Nagao Tsuchiya	1	5
Norway	Joakim Suther	0	6

=== Round-robin results ===
==== Draw 1 ====
Wednesday, January 26, 13:00

Sheet A	1	2	3	4	5	6	7	8	Final
Japan Selection (Tsuruga) 🔨	0	2	0	0	0	0	X	X	2
China (Ji)	2	0	3	1	1	2	X	X	9

Sheet C	1	2	3	4	5	6	7	8	Final
South Korea (Dong)	1	1	2	2	1	1	X	X	6
(Japan) Nagano Selection (Tsuchiya) 🔨	0	0	0	0	0	0	X	X	0

==== Draw 2 ====
Wednesday, January 26, 16:15

Sheet A	1	2	3	4	5	6	7	8	Final
Japan (Morozumi) 🔨	0	1	0	3	0	0	0	2	6
United States (George)	1	0	2	0	0	1	0	0	4

Sheet C	1	2	3	4	5	6	7	8	9	Final
Canada (Appelman)	0	3	0	0	2	0	0	0	2	7
Norway (Suther) 🔨	0	0	1	1	0	1	1	1	0	5

==== Draw 3 ====
Wednesday, January 26, 19:30

Sheet B	1	2	3	4	5	6	7	8	Final
United States (George)	0	0	0	0	0	2	1	2	5
China (Ji) 🔨	0	1	1	0	1	0	0	0	3

Sheet D	1	2	3	4	5	6	7	8	9	Final
(Japan) Nagano Selection (Tsuchiya)	0	1	0	2	1	0	0	2	0	6
Japan Selection (Tsuruga) 🔨	1	0	2	0	0	2	1	0	1	7

==== Draw 4 ====
Thursday, January 27, 9:00

Sheet B	1	2	3	4	5	6	7	8	Final
Norway (Suther)	1	0	0	1	0	0	1	X	3
Japan (Morozumi) 🔨	0	2	0	0	2	1	0	X	5

Sheet D	1	2	3	4	5	6	7	8	Final
Canada (Appelman)	0	0	0	1	1	0	1	0	3
South Korea (Dong) 🔨	1	0	1	0	0	2	0	1	5

==== Draw 5 ====
Thursday, January 27, 12:15

Sheet A	1	2	3	4	5	6	7	8	Final
United States (George) 🔨	3	1	0	1	0	1	2	X	8
Japan Selection (Tsuruga)	0	0	1	0	2	0	0	X	3

Sheet C	1	2	3	4	5	6	7	8	Final
(Japan) Nagano Selection (Tsuchiya) 🔨	2	0	0	0	0	1	0	X	3
Canada (Appelman)	0	1	3	3	3	0	4	X	14

==== Draw 6 ====
Thursday, January 27, 15:30

Sheet A	1	2	3	4	5	6	7	8	Final
China (Ji)	0	2	5	0	1	0	0	X	8
Norway (Suther) 🔨	0	0	0	1	0	2	2	X	5

Sheet C	1	2	3	4	5	6	7	8	9	Final
Japan (Morozumi)	1	0	2	0	0	1	0	2	0	6
South Korea (Dong) 🔨	0	1	0	1	2	0	2	0	1	7

==== Draw 7 ====
Thursday, January 27, 18:45

Sheet B	1	2	3	4	5	6	7	8	9	Final
Japan Selection (Tsuruga)	0	1	0	1	1	0	2	0	0	5
Canada (Appelman) 🔨	2	0	1	0	0	1	0	1	1	6

Sheet D	1	2	3	4	5	6	7	8	Final
United States (George)	1	1	0	2	1	0	2	X	7
Norway (Suther) 🔨	0	0	1	0	0	2	0	X	3

==== Draw 8 ====
Friday, January 28, 9:00

Sheet A	1	2	3	4	5	6	7	8	Final
(Japan) Nagano Selection (Tsuchiya)	1	0	1	0	0	0	1	X	3
Japan (Morozumi) 🔨	0	2	0	1	1	2	0	X	6

Sheet C	1	2	3	4	5	6	7	8	Final
South Korea (Dong)	1	0	0	1	1	0	1	1	5
China (Ji) 🔨	0	2	1	0	0	0	0	0	3

==== Draw 9 ====
Friday, January 28, 12:15

Sheet B	1	2	3	4	5	6	7	8	Final
Japan Selection (Tsuruga) 🔨	0	2	2	2	0	0	2	X	8
Norway (Suther)	1	0	0	0	2	1	0	X	4

Sheet D	1	2	3	4	5	6	7	8	Final
Canada (Appelman) 🔨	3	3	0	1	0	1	X	X	8
Japan (Morozumi)	0	0	1	0	2	0	X	X	3

==== Draw 10 ====
Friday, January 28, 15:30

Sheet B	1	2	3	4	5	6	7	8	9	Final
South Korea (Dong) 🔨	0	1	1	0	1	0	1	1	0	5
United States (George)	1	0	0	3	0	1	0	0	1	6

Sheet D	1	2	3	4	5	6	7	8	Final
China (Ji)	0	3	1	0	4	0	0	0	8
(Japan) Nagano Selection (Tsuchiya) 🔨	2	0	0	2	0	1	2	2	9

==== Draw 11 ====
Friday, January 28, 18:45

Sheet A	1	2	3	4	5	6	7	8	Final
Norway (Suther)	0	0	1	0	0	2	1	0	4
South Korea (Dong) 🔨	0	2	0	1	1	0	0	1	5

Sheet C	1	2	3	4	5	6	7	8	Final
Japan (Morozumi) 🔨	0	2	3	0	1	0	1	0	7
Japan Selection (Tsuruga)	4	0	0	2	0	2	0	1	9

==== Draw 12 ====
Saturday, January 29, 8:00

Sheet A	1	2	3	4	5	6	7	8	Final
Canada (Appelman) 🔨	2	1	0	2	0	2	X	X	7
China (Ji)	0	0	2	0	0	0	X	X	2

Sheet C	1	2	3	4	5	6	7	8	Final
(Japan) Nagano Selection (Tsuchiya) 🔨	1	0	0	1	0	0	1	X	3
United States (George)	0	0	3	0	4	2	0	X	9

==== Draw 13 ====
Saturday, January 29, 11:15

Sheet A	1	2	3	4	5	6	7	8	9	Final
Japan Selection (Tsuruga) 🔨	1	0	1	0	2	0	0	1	0	5
South Korea (Dong)	0	1	0	1	0	2	1	0	1	6

Sheet C	1	2	3	4	5	6	7	8	Final
China (Ji)	0	1	0	1	0	1	X	X	3
Japan (Morozumi) 🔨	2	0	5	0	3	0	X	X	10

==== Draw 14 ====
Saturday, January 29, 14:30

Sheet B	1	2	3	4	5	6	7	8	Final
Norway (Suther) 🔨	0	2	1	0	0	0	0		0
(Japan) Nagano Selection (Tsuchiya)	0	0	0	0	2	1	0		0

Sheet D	1	2	3	4	5	6	7	8	Final
Canada (Appelman) 🔨	0	2	0	0	2	0	2	X	6
United States (George)	1	0	0	1	0	1	0	X	3

=== Playoffs ===
Semifinals
1	Japan	6
4	South Korea	5
3	United States	7
2	Canada	6

Gold Medal Final
Japan	8
United States	3
Bronze Medal Final
South Korea	7
Canada	4

==== Semifinals ====
Sunday, January 30, 9:00

Sheet B	1	2	3	4	5	6	7	8	9	10	Final
Japan (Morozumi)	0	2	0	1	2	1	0	0	0	0	5
South Korea (Dong) 🔨	2	0	1	0	0	0	0	0	2	0	4

Sheet D	1	2	3	4	5	6	7	8	9	10	Final
United States (George)	0	2	0	1	0	2	0	1	0	1	7
Canada (Appelman) 🔨	1	0	1	0	2	0	1	0	1	0	6

==== Gold Medal Final ====
Sunday, January 30, 13:00

Sheet C	1	2	3	4	5	6	7	8	9	10	Final
Japan (Morozumi)	0	0	3	0	0	3	0	2	X	X	8
United States (George) 🔨	1	0	0	1	0	0	1	0	X	X	3

==== Bronze Medal Final ====
Sunday, January 30, 13:00

Sheet A	1	2	3	4	5	6	7	8	9	10	Final
South Korea (Dong) 🔨	0	0	2	1	2	0	0	1	0	1	7
Canada (Appelman)	1	0	0	0	0	1	0	0	2	0	4

== Women's ==
=== Teams ===
	Regions	Skip	Third	Second	Lead	Locale
Foreign; Berths	Canada	Jennifer Jones	Kaitlyn Lawes	Jill Officer	Dawn Askin	
Foreign; Berths	Sweden	Ditte Karlsson	Mikael Törnkvist	Frida Lideberg	Joanna Lindahl	
Foreign; Berths	United States	Patti Lank	Caitlin Moraldo	Jessica Schultz	Christina Schwartz	
Foreign; Berths	South Korea	Kim Ji-suk	Jeong Jin-sook	Kang You-ri	Park Min-hee	
Foreign; Berths	China	Liu Jinli	Huang Sining	Zheng Chunmei	Zhang Xindi	
Japanese; Berths	Japan National Team	Satsuki Fujisawa	Miyo Ichikawa	Emi Shimizu	Miyuki Satoh	
Japanese; Berths	Japan Selection Team	Kai Tsuchiya	Mina Ichibori	Kie Igarashi	Erika Otani	Mikiko Tsuchiya
Japanese; Berths	(Japan) Nagano Selection Team	Nagisa Matsumura	Yukako Tsuchiya	Aiko Iwasaki	Mitsuki Satoh	Chiemi Kameyama

=== Standings ===
Region	Skip	W	L
Canada	Jennifer Jones	7	0
United States	Patti Lank	6	1
Japan	Satsuki Fujisawa	4	3
South Korea	Kim Ji-suk	3	4
China	Liu Jinli	3	4
Japan Selection	Kai Tsuchiya	2	5
Sweden	Ditte Karlsson	2	5
(Japan) Nagano Selection	Nagisa Matsumara	1	6

=== Round-robin results ===
==== Draw 1 ====
Wednesday, January 26, 13:00

Sheet B	1	2	3	4	5	6	7	8	Final
(Japan) Nagano Selection (Matsumara)	1	0	1	1	0	1	0	0	4
China (Liu) 🔨	0	3	0	0	3	0	0	1	7

Sheet D	1	2	3	4	5	6	7	8	Final
Japan (Fujisawa) 🔨	0	0	2	0	3	0	0	2	7
South Korea (Kim)	0	0	0	1	0	0	2	0	3

==== Draw 2 ====
Wednesday, January 26, 16:15

Sheet B	1	2	3	4	5	6	7	8	Final
Japan Selection (Tsuchiya) 🔨	0	1	0	0	2	1	0	0	4
United States (Lank)	2	0	0	2	0	0	5	1	10

Sheet D	1	2	3	4	5	6	7	8	Final
Sweden (Karlsson) 🔨	0	2	0	0	1	0	0	0	3
Canada (Jones)	3	0	1	2	0	2	1	2	11

==== Draw 3 ====
Wednesday, January 26, 19:30

Sheet A	1	2	3	4	5	6	7	8	Final
United States (Lank) 🔨	0	2	0	2	1	0	2	X	7
China (Liu)	1	0	1	0	0	2	0	X	4

Sheet C	1	2	3	4	5	6	7	8	Final
Japan (Fujisawa)	0	2	1	0	2	1	1	X	7
(Japan) Nagano Selection (Matsumara) 🔨	2	0	0	1	0	0	0	X	3

==== Draw 4 ====
Thursday, January 27, 9:00

Sheet A	1	2	3	4	5	6	7	8	Final
Sweden (Karlsson)	0	3	4	0	2	1	0	X	10
Japan Selection (Tsuchiya) 🔨	1	0	0	1	0	0	1	X	3

Sheet C	1	2	3	4	5	6	7	8	Final
Canada (Jones) 🔨	3	0	3	0	2	0	3	X	11
South Korea (Kim)	0	2	0	2	0	1	0	X	5

==== Draw 5 ====
Thursday, January 27, 12:15

Sheet B	1	2	3	4	5	6	7	8	9	Final
Japan (Fujisawa) 🔨	2	1	0	1	1	0	1	0	0	6
Canada (Jones)	0	0	2	0	0	1	0	3	2	8

Sheet D	1	2	3	4	5	6	7	8	Final
United States (Lank) 🔨	1	0	2	4	0	0	1	2	10
(Japan) Nagano Selection (Matsumara)	0	2	0	0	2	1	0	0	5

==== Draw 6 ====
Thursday, January 27, 15:30

Sheet B	1	2	3	4	5	6	7	8	Final
China (Liu) 🔨	1	1	0	2	0	0	3	X	7
Sweden (Karlsson)	0	0	1	0	0	0	0	X	1

Sheet D	1	2	3	4	5	6	7	8	Final
Japan Selection (Tsuchiya)	0	1	0	1	1	0	2	2	7
South Korea (Kim) 🔨	0	0	1	0	0	2	0	0	3

==== Draw 7 ====
Thursday, January 27, 18:45

Sheet A	1	2	3	4	5	6	7	8	Final
(Japan) Nagano Selection (Matsumara)	1	0	0	0	0	1	0	X	2
Canada (Jones) 🔨	0	2	2	1	2	0	4	X	11

Sheet C	1	2	3	4	5	6	7	8	Final
United States (Lank)	0	0	1	1	0	2	2	X	6
Sweden (Karlsson) 🔨	0	0	0	0	1	0	0	X	1

==== Draw 8 ====
Friday, January 28, 9:00

Sheet B	1	2	3	4	5	6	7	8	Final
Japan (Fujisawa)	0	1	0	1	0	4	0	2	8
Japan Selection (Tsuchiya) 🔨	2	0	1	0	2	0	1	0	6

Sheet D	1	2	3	4	5	6	7	8	Final
South Korea (Kim)	0	1	1	1	0	3	0	1	7
China (Liu) 🔨	1	0	0	0	1	0	3	0	5

==== Draw 9 ====
Friday, January 28, 12:15

Sheet A	1	2	3	4	5	6	7	8	Final
(Japan) Nagano Selection (Matsumara) 🔨	2	0	0	3	0	2	0	0	7
Sweden (Karlsson)	0	1	2	0	1	0	1	1	6

Sheet C	1	2	3	4	5	6	7	8	Final
Canada (Jones) 🔨	3	0	3	1	2	0	4	X	13
Japan Selection (Tsuchiya)	0	1	0	0	0	2	0	X	3

==== Draw 10 ====
Friday, January 28, 15:30

Sheet A	1	2	3	4	5	6	7	8	Final
South Korea (Kim)	1	0	0	0	1	0	1	X	3
United States (Lank) 🔨	0	1	1	1	0	3	0	X	6

Sheet C	1	2	3	4	5	6	7	8	Final
China (Liu) 🔨	1	0	0	2	0	1	1	0	5
Japan (Fujisawa)	0	2	1	0	1	0	0	2	6

==== Draw 11 ====
Friday, January 28, 18:45

Sheet B	1	2	3	4	5	6	7	8	Final
Sweden (Karlsson) 🔨	0	0	2	0	0	2	0	X	4
South Korea (Kim)	1	0	0	3	1	0	2	X	7

Sheet D	1	2	3	4	5	6	7	8	Final
Japan Selection (Tsuchiya)	3	0	1	0	1	3	0	X	8
(Japan) Nagano Selection (Matsumara) 🔨	0	1	0	1	0	0	1	X	3

==== Draw 12 ====
Saturday, January 29, 8:00

Sheet B	1	2	3	4	5	6	7	8	Final
China (Liu)	0	0	0	1	0	1	X	X	2
Canada (Jones) 🔨	2	4	1	0	2	0	X	X	9

Sheet D	1	2	3	4	5	6	7	8	Final
Japan (Fujisawa)	1	0	1	0	0	1	0	X	3
United States (Lank) 🔨	0	2	0	3	2	0	0	X	7

==== Draw 13 ====
Saturday, January 29, 11:15

Sheet B	1	2	3	4	5	6	7	8	Final
(Japan) Nagano Selection (Matsumara) 🔨	2	0	2	0	0	0	1	X	5
South Korea (Kim)	0	4	0	1	2	2	0	X	9

Sheet D	1	2	3	4	5	6	7	8	Final
China (Liu) 🔨	6	2	0	0	3	0	X	X	11
Japan Selection (Tsuchiya)	0	0	1	0	0	1	X	X	2

==== Draw 14 ====
Saturday, January 29, 14:30

Sheet A	1	2	3	4	5	6	7	8	Final
Sweden (Karlsson)	0	1	1	0	1	3	3	X	9
Japan (Fujisawa) 🔨	1	0	0	2	0	0	0	X	3

Sheet C	1	2	3	4	5	6	7	8	Final
Canada (Jones) 🔨	3	0	0	2	1	1	X	X	7
United States (Lank)	0	1	1	0	0	0	X	X	2

=== Tiebreaker ===
Team	1	2	3	4	5	6	7	8	Final
South Korea (Kim)	0	0	2	0	1	1	0	0	4
China (Liu) 🔨	2	0	0	2	0	0	0	1	5

=== Playoffs ===
Semifinals
1	United States	7
4	Japan	8
3	China	7
2	Canada	10

Gold Medal Final
Japan	4
Canada	8
Bronze Medal Final
United States	6
China	5

==== Semifinals ====
Sunday, January 30, 9:00

Sheet A	1	2	3	4	5	6	7	8	9	10	11	Final
United States (Lank) 🔨	0	1	1	0	2	0	1	0	0	1	0	7
Japan (Fujisawa)	1	0	0	1	0	1	0	3	1	0	1	8

Sheet C	1	2	3	4	5	6	7	8	9	10	11	Final
China (Liu)	0	2	0	0	2	0	0	1	0	2	0	7
Canada (Jones) 🔨	1	0	0	2	0	1	1	0	2	0	3	10

==== Gold Medal Final ====
Sunday, January 30, 13:00

Sheet C	1	2	3	4	5	6	7	8	9	10	Final
Japan (Fujisawa)	1	0	0	2	0	0	1	0	0	X	4
Canada (Jones) 🔨	0	1	1	0	2	1	0	2	1	X	8

==== Bronze Medal Final ====
Sunday, January 30, 13:00

Sheet D	1	2	3	4	5	6	7	8	9	10	Final
China (Liu)	2	0	1	0	0	0	1	0	1	0	5
United States (Lank) 🔨	0	1	0	2	1	0	0	1	0	1	6
