= 2012 Karuizawa International Curling Championship =

- Host city: Karuizawa, Japan
- Arena: SCAP Karuizawa Arena
- Dates: January 25–29
- Men's winner: Japan Selection
- Skip: Yusuke Morozumi
- Third: Tsuyoshi Yamaguchi
- Second: Tetsuro Shimizu
- Lead: Kosuke Morozumi
- Finalist: Canada (Colin Thomas)
- Women's winner: Canada
- Skip: Laura Crocker
- Third: Sarah Wilkes
- Second: Jen Gates
- Lead: Pam Feldkamp
- Alternate: Cheryl Kreviazuk
- Finalist: Switzerland (Silvana Tirinzoni)

The 2012 Karuizawa International Curling Championship was held from January 25 to 29 at the SCAP Karuizawa Arena in Karuizawa, Japan. The bonspiel featured eight teams from each gender (five foreign teams and three Japanese teams) that played in a round-robin format. The top four teams of each gender played in a single-elimination playoff round to determine the winners.

== Men ==
=== Teams ===
The teams are listed as follows:

	Regions	Skip	Third	Second	Lead	Alternate
Foreign; Berths	Canada	Colin Thomas	Cory Schuh	Chris Ford	Spencer Wicks	Stephen Ryan
Foreign; Berths	Norway	Thomas Løvold	Steffen Walstad	Thomas Due	Sander Rølvaag	Kenneth Andersen
Foreign; Berths	Germany	Jamie Boutin	Robert Krüger	Andreas Hofmann	Martin Schulz-Dobrick	Konstantin Kampf
Foreign; Berths	China	Liu Rui	Xu Xiaoming	Ba Dexin	Zang Jialiang	Chen Lu'an
Foreign; Berths	South Korea	Kim Chang-min	Kim Min-chan	Seong Seh-yeon	Seo Young-sun	Oh Eun-su
Japanese; Berths	Japan National Team	Nobuaki Mutoh	Takahiro Yoshida	Shinya Iwamoto	Tatsuya Hayashi	Toshiya Murata
Japanese; Berths	Japan Selection Team	Yusuke Morozumi	Tsuyoshi Yamaguchi	Tetsuro Shimizu	Kosuke Morozumi	
Japanese; Berths	(Japan) Nagano Selection Team	Yuta Matsumara	Yuki Sakamoto	Yoshiro Shimizu	Yuki Tsuchiya	

=== Round-robin standings ===
Final round-robin standings

Key
Teams to Playoffs
Teams to Tiebreaker

Region	Skip	W	L
South Korea	Kim Chang-min	6	1
Canada	Colin Thomas	5	2
China	Liu Rui	5	2
Japan Selection	Yusuke Morozumi	3	4
(Japan) Nagano Selection	Yuta Matsumara	3	4
Germany	Jamie Boutin	2	5
Norway	Thomas Løvold	2	5
Japan	Nobuaki Mutoh	2	5

=== Round-robin results ===
All draw times listed in Japan Standard Time (UTC+9).

==== Draw 1 ====
Wednesday, January 25, 13:00

Sheet A	1	2	3	4	5	6	7	8	Final
Japan Selection (Morozumi)	1	0	3	1	0	2	0	X	7
China (Liu)	0	1	0	0	2	0	1	X	4

Sheet C	1	2	3	4	5	6	7	8	Final
South Korea (Kim)	0	2	0	2	0	2	2	X	8
(Japan) Nagano Selection (Matsumara)	2	0	2	0	1	0	0	X	5

==== Draw 2 ====
Wednesday, January 25, 16:15

Sheet A	1	2	3	4	5	6	7	8	Final
Japan (Mutoh)	1	0	0	1	1	0	2	0	5
Germany (Boutin)	0	0	2	0	0	1	0	1	4

Sheet C	1	2	3	4	5	6	7	8	Final
Norway (Løvold)	0	1	1	0	1	0	0	X	3
Canada (Thomas)	0	0	0	0	0	1	1	X	2

==== Draw 3 ====
Wednesday, January 25, 19:30

Sheet B	1	2	3	4	5	6	7	8	Final
Germany (Boutin)	0	3	0	3	0	0	0	0	6
China (Liu)	0	0	2	0	2	1	1	1	7

Sheet D	1	2	3	4	5	6	7	8	9	Final
(Japan) Nagano Selection (Matsumara)	2	0	1	0	0	0	2	1	1	7
Japan Selection (Morozumi)	0	3	0	1	1	1	0	0	0	6

==== Draw 4 ====
Thursday, January 26, 9:00

Sheet B	1	2	3	4	5	6	7	8	9	Final
Norway (Løvold)	1	0	1	1	0	1	0	2	2	8
Japan (Mutoh)	0	2	0	0	3	0	1	0	0	6

Sheet D	1	2	3	4	5	6	7	8	9	Final
Canada (Thomas)	0	1	1	0	0	2	0	2	1	7
South Korea (Kim)	2	0	0	2	0	0	2	0	0	6

==== Draw 5 ====
Thursday, January 26, 12:15

Sheet A	1	2	3	4	5	6	7	8	Final
Germany (Boutin)	0	0	1	0	2	0	0	X	3
Japan Selection (Morozumi)	2	1	0	3	0	2	2	X	10

Sheet C	1	2	3	4	5	6	7	8	Final
(Japan) Nagano Selection (Matsumara)	0	1	0	0	1	0	2	0	4
Canada (Thomas)	1	0	1	2	0	1	0	1	6

==== Draw 6 ====
Thursday, January 26, 15:30

Sheet A	1	2	3	4	5	6	7	8	Final
China (Liu)	3	0	0	2	0	2	1	X	8
Norway (Løvold)	0	1	1	0	1	0	0	X	3

Sheet C	1	2	3	4	5	6	7	8	Final
Japan (Mutoh)	0	0	0	1	0	0	X	X	1
South Korea (Kim)	0	3	0	0	2	3	X	X	8

==== Draw 7 ====
Thursday, January 26, 18:45

Sheet B	1	2	3	4	5	6	7	8	Final
Japan Selection (Morozumi)	0	1	0	0	1	0	2	0	4
Canada (Thomas)	0	0	0	3	0	2	0	1	6

Sheet D	1	2	3	4	5	6	7	8	9	Final
Germany (Boutin)	3	1	0	0	1	0	0	1	1	7
Norway (Løvold)	0	0	1	2	0	2	1	0	0	6

==== Draw 8 ====
Friday, January 27, 9:00

Sheet A	1	2	3	4	5	6	7	8	Final
(Japan) Nagano Selection (Matsumara)	0	1	0	3	1	5	X	X	10
Japan (Mutoh)	1	0	2	0	0	0	X	X	3

Sheet C	1	2	3	4	5	6	7	8	Final
South Korea (Kim)	0	1	1	1	0	0	2	1	6
China (Liu)	1	0	0	0	2	0	0	0	3

==== Draw 9 ====
Friday, January 27, 12:15

Sheet B	1	2	3	4	5	6	7	8	Final
Japan Selection (Morozumi)	3	0	0	1	0	2	0	1	7
Norway (Løvold)	0	3	0	0	1	0	1	0	5

Sheet D	1	2	3	4	5	6	7	8	Final
Canada (Thomas)	2	0	1	0	1	0	2	X	6
Japan (Mutoh)	0	1	0	1	0	0	0	X	2

==== Draw 10 ====
Friday, January 27, 15:30

Sheet B	1	2	3	4	5	6	7	8	Final
South Korea (Kim)	0	4	2	0	2	2	X	X	10
Germany (Boutin)	1	0	0	2	0	0	X	X	3

Sheet D	1	2	3	4	5	6	7	8	Final
China (Liu)	0	0	1	1	1	2	0	X	5
(Japan) Nagano Selection (Matsumara)	0	1	0	0	0	0	1	X	2

==== Draw 11 ====
Friday, January 27, 18:45

Sheet A	1	2	3	4	5	6	7	8	Final
Norway (Løvold)	2	0	0	2	0	0	0	0	4
South Korea (Kim)	0	0	1	0	2	1	1	2	7

Sheet C	1	2	3	4	5	6	7	8	Final
Japan (Mutoh)	1	0	1	0	0	0	3	2	7
Japan Selection (Morozumi)	0	1	0	2	0	0	0	0	3

==== Draw 12 ====
Saturday, January 28, 8:00

Sheet A	1	2	3	4	5	6	7	8	Final
Canada (Thomas)	0	0	0	1	0	0	X	X	1
China (Liu)	3	2	4	0	0	0	X	X	9

Sheet C	1	2	3	4	5	6	7	8	Final
(Japan) Nagano Selection (Matsumara)	0	0	0	2	0	1	0	X	3
Germany (Boutin)	1	1	1	0	3	0	3	X	9

==== Draw 13 ====
Saturday, January 28, 11:15

Sheet A	1	2	3	4	5	6	7	8	Final
Japan Selection (Morozumi)	0	1	0	2	0	1	0	X	4
South Korea (Kim)	1	0	2	0	2	0	3	X	8

Sheet C	1	2	3	4	5	6	7	8	Final
China (Liu)	1	0	1	0	0	2	0	0	4
Japan (Mutoh)	0	0	0	2	0	0	0	1	3

==== Draw 14 ====
Saturday, January 28, 14:30

Sheet B	1	2	3	4	5	6	7	8	Final
Norway (Løvold)	0	0	1	0	0	1	2	X	4
(Japan) Nagano Selection (Matsumara)	1	1	0	3	1	0	0	X	6

Sheet D	1	2	3	4	5	6	7	8	Final
Canada (Thomas)	1	0	1	2	2	2	X	X	8
Germany (Boutin)	0	1	0	0	0	0	X	X	1

=== Tiebreaker ===
Saturday, January 28, 17:30

Sheet A	1	2	3	4	5	6	7	8	Final
Japan Selection (Morozumi)	0	2	0	3	0	X	X	X	5
(Japan) Nagano Selection (Matsumara)	1	0	0	0	1	X	X	X	2

=== Playoffs ===
Semifinals
1	South Korea	5
4	Japan Selection	10
3	Canada	9
2	China	6

Gold Medal Final
4	Japan Selection	7
3	Canada	6
Bronze Medal Final
1	South Korea	7
2	China	6

==== Semifinals ====
Sunday, January 29, 9:00

Sheet B	1	2	3	4	5	6	7	8	9	10	Final
South Korea (Kim)	1	0	1	0	2	0	0	1	0	X	5
Japan Selection (Morozumi)	0	2	0	2	0	4	1	0	1	X	10

Sheet D	1	2	3	4	5	6	7	8	9	10	11	Final
Canada (Thomas)	0	1	0	2	0	2	0	1	0	0	3	9
China (Liu)	1	0	1	0	1	0	0	0	2	1	0	6

==== Bronze-medal game ====
Sunday, January 29, 13:00

Sheet A	1	2	3	4	5	6	7	8	9	10	Final
South Korea (Kim)	0	0	2	1	1	0	0	3	0	X	7
China (Liu)	0	1	0	0	0	2	1	0	2	X	6

==== Gold Medal Final ====
Sunday, January 29, 13:00

Sheet C	1	2	3	4	5	6	7	8	9	10	11	Final
Japan Selection (Morozumi)	0	2	0	0	1	0	2	0	1	0	1	7
Canada (Thomas)	0	0	1	0	0	2	0	2	0	1	0	6

== Women ==
=== Teams ===
The teams are listed as follows:

	Regions	Skip	Third	Second	Lead	Alternate
Foreign; Berths	Canada	Laura Crocker	Sarah Wilkes	Jennifer Gates	Pam Feldkamp	Cheryl Kreviazuk
Foreign; Berths	China	Wang Bingyu	Sun Yue	Yue Qingshuang	Zhou Yan	Liu Jinli
Foreign; Berths	Denmark	Madeleine Dupont	Denise Dupont	Christine Svensen	Lina Knudsen	
Foreign; Berths	Switzerland	Silvana Tirinzoni	Irene Schori	Esther Neuenschwander	Sandra Gantenbein	
Foreign; Berths	South Korea	Kim Ji-sun	Lee Seul-bee	Gim Un-chi	Lee Hyun-Jang	
Japanese; Berths	Japan National Team	Satsuki Fujisawa	Miyo Ichikawa	Emi Shimizu	Miyuki Satoh	Chiaki Matsumura
Japanese; Berths	Japan Selection Team	Mayo Yamaura (fourth)	Shinobu Aota (skip)	Anna Ohmiya	Kotomi Ishizaki	
Japanese; Berths	(Japan) Nagano Selection Team	Kai Tsuchiya	Kie Igarashi	Mina Uchibori	Erika Otani	Misaki Kobayashi

=== Round-robin standings ===
Final round-robin standings

Key
Teams to Playoffs
Teams to Tiebreakers

Region	Skip	W	L
Canada	Laura Crocker	5	2
South Korea	Kim Ji-sun	5	2
China	Wang Bingyu	4	3
Japan Selection	Shinobu Aota	4	3
Switzerland	Silvana Tirinzoni	4	3
(Japan) Nagano Selection	Kai Tsuchiya	3	4
Denmark	Madeleine Dupont	2	5
Japan	Satsuki Fujisawa	1	6

=== Round-robin results ===
All draw times listed in Japan Standard Time (UTC+9).

==== Draw 1 ====
Wednesday, January 25, 13:00

Sheet B	1	2	3	4	5	6	7	8	Final
(Japan) Nagano Selection (Tsuchiya)	0	1	0	0	0	0	0	X	1
China (Wang)	2	0	1	1	2	3	3	X	12

Sheet D	1	2	3	4	5	6	7	8	Final
South Korea (Kim)	1	1	0	0	3	0	4	X	9
Japan (Fujisawa)	0	0	0	4	0	1	0	X	5

==== Draw 2 ====
Wednesday, January 25, 16:15

Sheet B	1	2	3	4	5	6	7	8	Final
Japan Selection (Aota)	1	0	0	2	0	0	1	1	5
Denmark (Dupont)	0	0	1	0	0	0	0	0	1

Sheet D	1	2	3	4	5	6	7	8	Final
Switzerland (Tirinzoni)	2	0	1	0	2	0	0	0	5
Canada (Crocker)	0	0	0	1	0	0	2	1	4

==== Draw 3 ====
Wednesday, January 25, 19:30

Sheet A	1	2	3	4	5	6	7	8	Final
Denmark (Dupont)	1	0	1	0	0	0	2	1	5
China (Wang)	0	2	0	1	1	2	0	0	6

Sheet C	1	2	3	4	5	6	7	8	Final
Japan (Fujisawa)	0	1	0	0	0	0	X	X	1
(Japan) Nagano Selection (Tsuchiya)	1	0	2	1	3	2	X	X	9

==== Draw 4 ====
Thursday, January 26, 9:00

Sheet A	1	2	3	4	5	6	7	8	Final
Switzerland (Tirinzoni)	0	2	0	2	0	0	1	1	6
Japan Selection (Aota)	1	0	1	0	1	0	0	0	3

Sheet C	1	2	3	4	5	6	7	8	Final
Canada (Crocker)	0	2	0	0	1	0	2	1	6
South Korea (Kim)	1	0	1	0	0	3	0	0	5

==== Draw 5 ====
Thursday, January 26, 12:15

Sheet B	1	2	3	4	5	6	7	8	Final
Japan (Fujisawa)	0	3	0	0	2	1	0	0	6
Canada (Crocker)	1	0	1	2	0	0	2	2	8

Sheet D	1	2	3	4	5	6	7	8	Final
Denmark (Dupont)	0	1	0	0	0	X	X	X	1
(Japan) Nagano Selection (Tsuchiya)	2	0	2	1	1	X	X	X	6

==== Draw 6 ====
Thursday, January 26, 15:30

Sheet B	1	2	3	4	5	6	7	8	Final
China (Wang)	0	1	1	0	0	0	2	1	5
Switzerland (Tirinzoni)	0	0	0	3	1	0	0	0	4

Sheet D	1	2	3	4	5	6	7	8	Final
Japan Selection (Aota)	1	0	2	0	2	0	0	5	10
South Korea (Kim)	0	2	0	1	0	2	0	0	5

==== Draw 7 ====
Thursday, January 26, 18:45

Sheet A	1	2	3	4	5	6	7	8	Final
(Japan) Nagano Selection (Tsuchiya)	0	2	1	0	0	0	1	X	4
Canada (Crocker)	2	0	0	3	1	1	0	X	7

Sheet C	1	2	3	4	5	6	7	8	Final
Denmark (Dupont)	1	0	2	0	5	1	X	X	9
Switzerland (Tirinzoni)	0	1	0	1	0	0	X	X	2

==== Draw 8 ====
Friday, January 27, 9:00

Sheet B	1	2	3	4	5	6	7	8	Final
Japan (Fujisawa)	2	1	0	0	3	0	3	X	9
Japan Selection (Aota)	0	0	1	1	0	2	0	X	4

Sheet D	1	2	3	4	5	6	7	8	Final
South Korea (Kim)	0	0	1	0	0	2	0	3	6
China (Wang)	1	0	0	0	1	0	0	0	2

==== Draw 9 ====
Friday, January 27, 12:15

Sheet A	1	2	3	4	5	6	7	8	Final
(Japan) Nagano Selection (Tsuchiya)	1	0	0	1	0	1	0	X	3
Switzerland (Tirinzoni)	0	2	1	0	2	0	0	X	5

Sheet C	1	2	3	4	5	6	7	8	Final
Canada (Crocker)	0	0	1	0	0	0	1	0	2
Japan Selection (Aota)	0	0	0	1	0	2	0	0	3

==== Draw 10 ====
Friday, January 27, 15:30

Sheet A	1	2	3	4	5	6	7	8	Final
South Korea (Kim)	0	1	0	0	2	1	1	X	5
Denmark (Dupont)	0	0	0	0	0	0	0	X	0

Sheet C	1	2	3	4	5	6	7	8	Final
China (Wang)	0	2	1	2	0	1	0	X	6
Japan (Fujisawa)	1	0	0	0	2	0	0	X	3

==== Draw 11 ====
Friday, January 27, 18:45

Sheet B	1	2	3	4	5	6	7	8	Final
Switzerland (Tirinzoni)	0	0	3	1	0	0	0	0	4
South Korea (Kim)	0	2	0	0	2	0	1	1	6

Sheet D	1	2	3	4	5	6	7	8	Final
Japan Selection (Aota)	0	1	0	1	0	2	0	X	4
(Japan) Nagano Selection (Tsuchiya)	2	0	1	0	3	0	1	X	7

==== Draw 12 ====
Saturday, January 28, 8:00

Sheet B	1	2	3	4	5	6	7	8	Final
China (Wang)	0	0	1	0	0	1	X	X	2
Canada (Crocker)	0	2	0	3	1	0	X	X	6

Sheet D	1	2	3	4	5	6	7	8	Final
Japan (Fujisawa)	0	0	1	0	1	1	0	0	3
Denmark (Dupont)	2	1	0	1	0	0	1	4	9

==== Draw 13 ====
Saturday, January 28, 11:15

Sheet B	1	2	3	4	5	6	7	8	Final
(Japan) Nagano Selection (Tsuchiya)	0	0	1	0	2	0	X	X	3
South Korea (Kim)	1	1	0	1	0	6	X	X	9

Sheet D	1	2	3	4	5	6	7	8	Final
China (Wang)	0	0	0	1	0	2	0	X	3
Japan Selection (Aota)	2	0	0	0	2	0	5	X	9

==== Draw 14 ====
Saturday, January 28, 14:30

Sheet A	1	2	3	4	5	6	7	8	Final
Switzerland (Tirinzoni)	1	0	0	3	0	1	0	1	6
Japan (Fujisawa)	0	0	1	0	2	0	2	0	5

Sheet C	1	2	3	4	5	6	7	8	Final
Canada (Crocker)	0	2	2	0	0	2	X	X	6
Denmark (Dupont)	0	0	0	0	1	0	X	X	1

=== Tiebreakers ===
Saturday, January 28, 17:30

Sheet B	1	2	3	4	5	6	7	8	Final
Switzerland (Tirinzoni)	1	1	0	2	0	1	X	X	5
China (Wang)	0	0	2	0	1	0	X	X	3

Saturday, January 28, 20:00

Sheet B	1	2	3	4	5	6	7	8	Final
China (Wang)	1	0	0	2	0	3	X	X	6
Japan Selection (Aota)	0	2	0	0	2	0	X	X	4

=== Playoffs ===
Semifinals
1	Canada	10
4	China	8
3	Switzerland	7
2	South Korea	5

Gold Medal Final
1	Canada	9
3	Switzerland	8
Bronze Medal Final
4	China	7
2	South Korea	10

==== Semifinals ====
Sunday, January 29, 9:00

Sheet C	1	2	3	4	5	6	7	8	9	10	Final
Canada (Crocker)	0	0	0	4	4	0	0	1	0	1	10
China (Wang)	0	1	1	0	0	3	1	0	2	0	8

Sheet A	1	2	3	4	5	6	7	8	9	10	Final
Switzerland (Tirinzoni)	0	0	1	0	1	1	0	3	0	1	7
South Korea (Kim)	0	0	0	2	0	0	2	0	1	0	5

==== Bronze-medal game ====
Sunday, January 29, 13:00

Sheet D	1	2	3	4	5	6	7	8	9	10	Final
China (Wang)	2	0	1	0	0	1	0	0	3	0	7
South Korea (Kim)	0	2	0	1	1	0	1	1	0	4	10

==== Gold-medal game ====
Sunday, January 29, 13:00

Sheet B	1	2	3	4	5	6	7	8	9	10	11	Final
Canada (Crocker)	0	1	0	1	0	1	0	2	0	3	1	9
Switzerland (Tirinzoni)	0	0	2	0	2	0	1	0	3	0	0	8
