= 2012 Canadian Wheelchair Curling Championship =

- Host city: Thunder Bay, Ontario
- Arena: Fort William Curling Club
- Dates: March 18–25
- Men's winner: Saskatchewan
- Curling club: Callie Curling Club, Regina
- Skip: Darwin Bender
- Third: Gil Dash
- Second: Marie Wright
- Lead: Larry Schrader
- Finalist: Alberta (Bruno Yizek)

The 2012 Canadian Wheelchair Curling Championship was held from March 18 to 25 at the Fort William Curling Club in Thunder Bay, Ontario.

== Teams ==
The teams are listed as follows:

Team	Skip	Third	Second	Lead	Alternate	Locale
(Ontario) Host Team	Rick Prud'homme	Sarah Lashbrook	Dennis Duclos	Gino Sonego	Linda Kontunen	Sudbury Curling Club, Sudbury
Alberta	Bruno Yizek	Jack Smart	Martin Purvis	Anne Hibberd	Bridget Wilson	Calgary Curling Club, Calgary
British Columbia	Frank LaBounty	Gerry Austgarden	Ellis Tull	Corinne Jensen	Allison Duddy	Nanaimo Curling Centre, Nanaimo
Manitoba	Dennis Thiessen	Mark Wherrett	Melissa Lecuyer	George Horning	Don Kalinsky	Assiniboine Curling Club, Winnipeg
Newfoundland and Labrador	Joanne MacDonald	Felix Green	Cecilia Carroll	Lanie Woodfine		RE/MAX Centre, St. John's
Northern Ontario	Carl Levesque	Rick Bell	Mel Prairie	Sharon LaFroye	Doug Dean	Fort William Curling Club, Thunder Bay
Nova Scotia	Richard Brown	Terry Cousineau	Steve Parfitt	Deborah Earle	Trendal Hubley-Bolivar	Lakeshore Curling Club, Lower Sackville
Ontario	Mark Ideson	Katie Paialunga	Tony Reynen	Shannon Wilcox	Jacqui Kinahan	Ilderton Curling Club, Ilderton
Quebec	Benoit Lessard	Carl Marquis	Sébastien Boisvert	Johanne Daly	Denis Grenier	Club de curling Magog, Magog
Saskatchewan	Darwin Bender	Gil Dash	Marie Wright	Larry Schrader		Callie Curling Club, Regina

== Round-robin standings ==
Final round-robin standings

Key
Teams to Playoffs
Teams to Tiebreaker

Province	Skip	W	L
Alberta	Bruno Yizek	8	1
Saskatchewan	Darwin Bender	7	2
Quebec	Benoit Lessard	7	2
Northern Ontario	Carl Levesque	5	4
Ontario	Mark Ideson	5	4
Manitoba	Dennis Thiessen	4	5
Nova Scotia	Richard Brown	3	6
British Columbia	Frank LaBounty	3	6
Newfoundland and Labrador	Joanne MacDonald	2	7
(Ontario) Host Team	Rick Prud'homme	1	8

== Round-robin results ==
All times listed in Eastern Standard Time (UTC–5).

=== Draw 1 ===
Monday, March 19, 10:30 am

Sheet A	1	2	3	4	5	6	7	8	Final
Saskatchewan (Bender)	0	0	1	0	1	0	0	1	3
Alberta (Yizek) 🔨	1	0	0	1	0	1	2	0	5

Sheet B	1	2	3	4	5	6	7	8	Final
Manitoba (Thiessen)	0	3	0	0	2	2	0	3	10
(Ontario) Host Team (Prud'homme) 🔨	2	0	1	2	0	0	2	0	7

Sheet C	1	2	3	4	5	6	7	8	Final
Ontario (Ideson) 🔨	5	1	0	0	2	2	0	X	10
Nova Scotia (Brown)	0	0	2	1	0	0	2	X	5

Sheet D	1	2	3	4	5	6	7	8	Final
Northern Ontario (Levesque) 🔨	3	3	2	0	2	2	X	X	12
Newfoundland and Labrador (MacDonald)	0	0	0	1	0	0	X	X	1

Sheet E	1	2	3	4	5	6	7	8	Final
British Columbia (LaBounty)	3	1	0	1	0	3	1	X	9
Quebec (Lessard) 🔨	0	0	2	0	2	0	0	X	4

=== Draw 2 ===
Monday, March 19, 2:30 pm

Sheet A	1	2	3	4	5	6	7	8	Final
Newfoundland and Labrador (MacDonald)	0	0	0	0	0	1	X	X	1
Ontario (Ideson) 🔨	2	1	1	3	4	0	X	X	11

Sheet B	1	2	3	4	5	6	7	8	Final
Nova Scotia (Brown)	0	0	0	0	0	0	X	X	0
Alberta (Yizek) 🔨	1	3	1	3	2	1	X	X	11

Sheet C	1	2	3	4	5	6	7	8	EE	Final
Quebec (Lessard)	0	1	0	0	2	0	1	2	0	6
Saskatchewan (Bender) 🔨	1	0	2	2	0	1	0	0	1	7

Sheet D	1	2	3	4	5	6	7	8	Final
(Ontario) Host Team (Prud'homme)	0	1	1	0	0	0	3	0	5
British Columbia (LaBounty) 🔨	2	0	0	3	1	1	0	1	8

Sheet E	1	2	3	4	5	6	7	8	Final
Manitoba (Thiessen)	0	4	1	0	1	1	3	X	10
Northern Ontario (Levesque) 🔨	1	0	0	1	0	0	0	X	2

=== Draw 3 ===
Tuesday, March 20, 10:30 am

Sheet A	1	2	3	4	5	6	7	8	Final
(Ontario) Host Team (Prud'homme)	0	0	0	0	1	0	X	X	1
Quebec (Lessard) 🔨	3	3	1	3	0	2	X	X	12

Sheet B	1	2	3	4	5	6	7	8	Final
British Columbia (LaBounty)	1	0	0	0	1	0	1	0	3
Northern Ontario (Levesque) 🔨	0	2	2	1	0	2	0	1	8

Sheet C	1	2	3	4	5	6	7	8	Final
Manitoba (Thiessen)	0	1	0	1	1	1	0	1	5
Newfoundland and Labrador (MacDonald) 🔨	2	0	1	0	0	0	1	0	4

Sheet D	1	2	3	4	5	6	7	8	Final
Ontario (Ideson)	0	1	0	0	2	0	0	0	3
Alberta (Yizek) 🔨	1	0	1	3	0	1	1	0	7

Sheet E	1	2	3	4	5	6	7	8	Final
Saskatchewan (Bender)	0	0	2	2	0	2	2	1	9
Nova Scotia (Brown) 🔨	2	2	0	0	2	0	0	0	6

=== Draw 4 ===
Tuesday, March 20, 2:30 pm

Sheet A	1	2	3	4	5	6	7	8	Final
British Columbia (LaBounty)	0	0	0	1	1	1	1	0	4
Manitoba (Thiessen) 🔨	3	0	1	0	0	0	0	4	8

Sheet B	1	2	3	4	5	6	7	8	EE	Final
Saskatchewan (Bender) 🔨	0	3	0	0	0	5	1	0	1	10
Ontario (Ideson)	2	0	3	2	1	0	0	1	0	9

Sheet C	1	2	3	4	5	6	7	8	Final
(Ontario) Host Team (Prud'homme)	1	0	0	2	1	0	0	2	6
Northern Ontario (Levesque) 🔨	0	3	2	0	0	1	1	0	7

Sheet D	1	2	3	4	5	6	7	8	Final
Nova Scotia (Brown)	0	1	0	1	0	0	0	0	2
Quebec (Lessard) 🔨	1	0	2	0	2	3	3	0	11

Sheet E	1	2	3	4	5	6	7	8	Final
Alberta (Yizek) 🔨	4	0	4	1	2	0	1	0	12
Newfoundland and Labrador (MacDonald)	0	1	0	0	0	3	0	0	4

=== Draw 5 ===
Wednesday, March 21, 2:30 pm

Sheet A	1	2	3	4	5	6	7	8	Final
Northern Ontario (Levesque) 🔨	1	0	3	1	0	0	0	2	7
Saskatchewan (Bender)	0	0	0	0	1	2	3	0	6

Sheet B	1	2	3	4	5	6	7	8	Final
Newfoundland and Labrador (MacDonald)	1	0	1	0	0	0	0	X	2
British Columbia (LaBounty) 🔨	0	1	0	1	2	3	2	X	9

Sheet C	1	2	3	4	5	6	7	8	Final
Alberta (Yizek) 🔨	0	0	0	1	0	0	2	0	3
Quebec (Lessard)	1	1	1	0	2	2	0	0	7

Sheet D	1	2	3	4	5	6	7	8	Final
Manitoba (Thiessen) 🔨	0	1	0	0	0	0	0	X	1
Ontario (Ideson)	1	0	1	1	1	1	3	X	8

Sheet E	1	2	3	4	5	6	7	8	Final
Nova Scotia (Brown)	1	1	0	1	0	0	0	0	3
(Ontario) Host Team (Prud'homme) 🔨	0	0	1	0	1	1	2	1	6

=== Draw 6 ===
Wednesday, March 21, 6:30 pm

Sheet A	1	2	3	4	5	6	7	8	Final
Quebec (Lessard) 🔨	1	1	1	1	1	1	1	X	7
Newfoundland and Labrador (MacDonald)	0	0	0	0	0	0	0	X	0

Sheet B	1	2	3	4	5	6	7	8	Final
Northern Ontario (Levesque) 🔨	0	0	0	5	0	0	2	0	7
Nova Scotia (Brown)	1	2	2	0	1	1	0	1	8

Sheet C	1	2	3	4	5	6	7	8	Final
Saskatchewan (Bender)	1	0	2	1	0	1	1	1	7
Manitoba (Thiessen) 🔨	0	3	0	0	1	0	0	0	4

Sheet D	1	2	3	4	5	6	7	8	Final
Alberta (Yizek) 🔨	2	3	0	6	0	1	0	X	12
(Ontario) Host Team (Prud'homme)	0	0	1	0	2	0	0	X	3

Sheet E	1	2	3	4	5	6	7	8	EE	Final
Ontario (Ideson)	1	1	3	1	0	1	0	0	1	8
British Columbia (LaBounty) 🔨	0	0	0	0	1	0	3	3	0	7

=== Draw 7 ===
Thursday, March 22, 10:30 am

Sheet A	1	2	3	4	5	6	7	8	Final
Manitoba (Thiessen) 🔨	1	1	1	0	1	0	2	0	6
Nova Scotia (Brown)	0	0	0	3	0	1	0	3	7

Sheet B	1	2	3	4	5	6	7	8	Final
Ontario (Ideson) 🔨	2	0	0	1	0	3	1	0	7
Quebec (Lessard)	0	2	2	0	1	0	0	4	9

Sheet C	1	2	3	4	5	6	7	8	Final
Newfoundland and Labrador (MacDonald)	0	1	0	1	1	3	0	1	7
(Ontario) Host Team (Prud'homme) 🔨	1	0	2	0	0	0	1	0	4

Sheet D	1	2	3	4	5	6	7	8	Final
British Columbia (LaBounty)	2	0	2	0	0	0	0	0	4
Saskatchewan (Bender) 🔨	0	1	0	3	1	1	1	0	7

Sheet E	1	2	3	4	5	6	7	8	Final
Northern Ontario (Levesque)	0	1	1	1	1	0	0	0	4
Alberta (Yizek) 🔨	2	0	0	0	0	2	2	2	8

=== Draw 8 ===
Thursday, March 22, 2:30 pm

Sheet A	1	2	3	4	5	6	7	8	Final
Ontario (Ideson)	2	0	1	1	1	3	1	X	9
(Ontario) Host Team (Prud'homme) 🔨	0	1	0	0	0	0	0	X	1

Sheet B	1	2	3	4	5	6	7	8	Final
Alberta (Yizek) 🔨	0	1	1	0	1	0	1	2	6
Manitoba (Thiessen)	1	0	0	2	0	1	0	0	4

Sheet C	1	2	3	4	5	6	7	8	Final
Nova Scotia (Brown) 🔨	0	1	1	0	1	1	1	0	5
British Columbia (LaBounty)	1	0	0	1	0	0	0	0	2

Sheet D	1	2	3	4	5	6	7	8	Final
Quebec (Lessard) 🔨	2	0	3	1	0	0	1	1	8
Northern Ontario (Levesque)	0	3	0	0	2	1	0	0	6

Sheet E	1	2	3	4	5	6	7	8	Final
Newfoundland and Labrador (MacDonald)	0	0	3	0	0	0	0	X	3
Saskatchewan (Bender) 🔨	1	3	0	1	3	1	0	X	9

=== Draw 9 ===
Friday, March 23, 10:30 am

Sheet A	1	2	3	4	5	6	7	8	Final
Alberta (Yizek)	0	1	2	0	1	0	2	2	8
British Columbia (LaBounty) 🔨	3	0	0	1	0	2	0	0	6

Sheet B	1	2	3	4	5	6	7	8	Final
(Ontario) Host Team (Prud'homme)	0	1	0	0	1	2	0	0	4
Saskatchewan (Bender) 🔨	1	0	1	3	0	0	1	1	7

Sheet C	1	2	3	4	5	6	7	8	Final
Northern Ontario (Levesque) 🔨	2	1	3	1	0	2	0	X	9
Ontario (Ideson)	0	0	0	0	1	0	1	X	2

Sheet D	1	2	3	4	5	6	7	8	Final
Newfoundland and Labrador (MacDonald)	0	1	2	1	1	0	1	2	8
Nova Scotia (Brown) 🔨	3	0	0	0	0	1	0	0	4

Sheet E	1	2	3	4	5	6	7	8	Final
Quebec (Lessard)	0	0	1	0	3	3	2	X	9
Manitoba (Thiessen) 🔨	0	1	0	1	0	0	0	X	2

=== Tiebreaker ===
Friday, March 23, 3:00 pm

Sheet C	1	2	3	4	5	6	7	8	EE	Final
Northern Ontario (Levesque)	0	1	1	2	0	2	0	3	0	9
Ontario (Ideson) 🔨	4	0	0	0	2	0	3	0	1	10

== Playoffs ==
Page playoff system
1	Alberta	5
2	Saskatchewan	4
3	Quebec	4
4	Ontario	5

Semifinal
2	Saskatchewan	7
4	Ontario	2

Final
1	Alberta	6
2	Saskatchewan	7

=== 1 vs. 2 Game ===
Saturday, March 24, 2:30 pm

Sheet C	1	2	3	4	5	6	7	8	Final
Alberta (Yizek) 🔨	0	0	0	2	0	1	1	1	5
Saskatchewan (Bender)	0	0	2	0	2	0	0	0	4

=== 3 vs. 4 Game ===
Saturday, March 24, 10:30 am

Sheet C	1	2	3	4	5	6	7	8	EE	Final
Quebec (Lessard) 🔨	0	2	1	0	1	0	0	0	0	4
Ontario (Ideson)	1	0	0	1	0	0	1	1	1	5

=== Semifinal ===
Sunday, March 25, 10:30 am

Sheet C	1	2	3	4	5	6	7	8	Final
Saskatchewan (Bender) 🔨	2	1	1	0	2	0	1	X	7
Ontario (Ideson)	0	0	0	1	0	1	0	X	2

=== Final ===
Sunday, March 25, 2:30 pm

Sheet C	1	2	3	4	5	6	7	8	EE	Final
Alberta (Yizek) 🔨	0	3	0	2	0	0	1	0	0	6
Saskatchewan (Bender)	2	0	1	0	2	0	0	1	1	7
