= 2012 Canadian Senior Curling Championships =

- Host city: Abbotsford, British Columbia
- Arena: Abbotsford Recreation Centre
- Dates: March 17–25
- Men's winner: Alberta
- Curling club: Red Deer Curling Centre, Red Deer
- Skip: Rob Armitage
- Third: Randy Ponich
- Second: Wilf Edgar
- Lead: Keith Glover
- Finalist: Newfoundland and Labrador (Glenn Goss)
- Women's winner: Alberta
- Curling club: Saville Sports Centre, Edmonton
- Skip: Cathy King
- Third: Carolyn Morris
- Second: Lesley McEwan
- Lead: Doreen Gares
- Finalist: Newfoundland and Labrador (Cathy Cunningham)

The 2012 Canadian Senior Curling Championships were held from March 17 to 25 at the Abbotsford Recreation Centre in Abbotsford, British Columbia. British Columbia last hosted the Canadian Seniors in 2004, and has previously hosted 6 Canadian Senior men's championships and five Canadian Senior women's championships. The winners of the championships went on to represent Canada at the 2013 World Senior Curling Championships.

== Men ==
=== Round Robin Standings ===
Final Round Robin Standings

Key
Teams to Playoffs

Province	Skip	W	L
Alberta	Rob Armitage	10	1
Newfoundland and Labrador	Glenn Goss	8	3
Ontario	Brian Lewis	8	3
British Columbia	Dennis Graber	7	4
Northern Ontario	Robbie Gordon	7	4
Manitoba	Kelly Robertson	6	5
Quebec	Pierre Charette	5	6
Saskatchewan	Eugene Hritzuk	5	6
New Brunswick	Mark Armstrong	4	7
Nova Scotia	Dave McCusker	3	8
Prince Edward Island	Charlie Wilkinson	2	9
Yukon	George Hilderman	1	10

=== Playoffs ===
Semifinal			Final
			1	Alberta	5
2	Newfoundland and Labrador	10	2	Newfoundland and Labrador	2
3	Ontario	4

==== Semifinal ====
Saturday, March 24, 7:00 pm

Sheet D	1	2	3	4	5	6	7	8	9	10	Final
Newfoundland and Labrador (Goss)	0	4	1	1	0	1	0	3	X	X	10
Ontario (Lewis)	0	0	0	0	2	0	2	0	X	X	4

==== Final ====
Sunday, March 25, 11:00 am

Sheet D	1	2	3	4	5	6	7	8	9	10	Final
Alberta (Armitage)	0	2	0	0	1	2	0	0	0	X	5
Newfoundland and Labrador (Goss)	0	0	1	0	0	0	0	1	0	X	2

2012 Canadian Senior Men's Curling Championship Winner
(Alberta)
Alberta
7th title

== Women ==
=== Round Robin Standings ===
Final Round Robin Standings

Key
Teams to Playoffs

Province	Skip	W	L
Alberta	Cathy King	9	2
Newfoundland and Labrador	Cathy Cunningham	9	2
Nova Scotia	Nancy Delahunt	8	3
New Brunswick	Heidi Hanlon	7	4
Ontario	Nancy Harrison	5	6
Saskatchewan	Darlene Gillies	5	6
Northern Ontario	Darla Esch	5	6
Quebec	Odette Trudel	5	6
Manitoba	Laurie Deprez	5	6
British Columbia	Penny Shantz	4	7
Prince Edward Island	Shirley Berry	3	8
Northwest Territories	Ann McKellar-Gillis	1	10

=== Playoffs ===
Semifinal			Final
			1	Alberta	9
2	Newfoundland and Labrador	5	2	Newfoundland and Labrador	5
3	Nova Scotia	2

==== Semifinal ====
Saturday, March 24, 2:00 pm

Sheet D	1	2	3	4	5	6	7	8	9	10	Final
Newfoundland and Labrador (Cunningham)	0	0	0	0	0	0	3	0	2	0	5
Nova Scotia (Delahunt)	0	1	0	0	0	0	0	0	0	1	2

==== Final ====
Sunday, March 25, 11:00 am

Sheet C	1	2	3	4	5	6	7	8	9	10	Final
Alberta (King)	0	1	0	1	0	2	0	2	3	X	9
Newfoundland and Labrador (Cunningham)	0	0	1	0	1	0	3	0	0	X	5

2012 Canadian Senior Women's Curling Championship Winner
(Alberta)
Alberta
6th title
