= Holly Thompson =

New Zealand curler

- Curler ♀
- Born: 12 March 1998 (age 28); Ranfurly, New Zealand

Team
- Curling club: Dunedin CC, Dunedin
- Skip: Bridget Becker
- Third: Holly Thompson
- Second: Rachael Pitts
- Lead: Ruby Kinney
- Alternate: Natalie Thurlow

Curling career
- Member Association: New Zealand
- World Championship: 2 (2023, 2024)
- World Mixed Championship: 1 (2024)
- Pacific-Asia Championship: 2 (2016, 2017)
- Pan Continental Championship: 3 (2022, 2023, 2025)
- Other appearances: Youth Olympic Games: 1 (2016)
Medal record
Curling
New Zealand Women's Championship
Gold medal – first place	2017 Dunedin
Gold medal – first place	2021 Dunedin
Gold medal – first place	2022 Naseby
Gold medal – first place	2023 Naseby
Silver medal – second place	2016 Naseby
Silver medal – second place	2018 Naseby
Silver medal – second place	2019 Naseby
Silver medal – second place	2020 Naseby
Bronze medal – third place	2015 Naseby
New Zealand Mixed Championship
Gold medal – first place	2022 Naseby
Silver medal – second place	2023 Naseby
New Zealand Mixed Doubles Championship
Silver medal – second place	2019 Naseby

Holly Thompson (born 12 March 1998) is a New Zealand curler from Taihape.

At the international level, she competed at the 2023 World Women's Championship (first-ever Worlds for the New Zealand women's curling team), two Pacific-Asia Championships and the 2022 Pan Continental Championships. She also competed at the 2016 Winter Youth Olympics (finishing 13th with the New Zealand mixed team, and 5th in mixed doubles with Sterling Middleton from Canada).

At the national level, she is a New Zealand women's and mixed team champion curler.

== Personal life ==
Thompson works as a receptionist and salesperson at the Taihape Veterinary Clinic.

== Teams and events ==
=== Women's ===
Season	Skip	Third	Second	Lead	Alternate	Coach	Events
2012–13	Holly Thompson	Catherine Greer	Tash Whyte	Jenn Becker			NZJCC 2012 (bronze)
2013–14	Eleanor Adviento	Tessa Farley	Holly Thompson	Jessica Smith	Waverley Taylor	Liz Matthews	PAJCC 2014 (4th)
2014–15	Eleanor Adviento	Waverley Taylor	Jessica Smith	Holly Thompson	Eloise Pointon	Nelson Ede	PAJCC 2015 (bronze)
2015–16	Wendy Becker	Bridget Becker	Jessica Smith	Holly Thompson			NZWCC 2015 (bronze)
2015–16	Eleanor Adviento	Jessica Smith	Waverley Taylor	Holly Thompson	Emma Sutherland	Nelson Ede	WJBCC 2016 (5th)
2016–17	Jessica Smith	Holly Thompson	Waverley Taylor	Bridget Becker	Anna de Boer		NZWCC 2016 (silver)
2016–17	Thivya Jeyaranjan	Chelsea Farley	Emma Sutherland	Holly Thompson	Elizabeth Matthews	Elizabeth Matthews	PACC 2016 (4th)
2016–17	Jessica Smith	Holly Thompson	Emma Sutherland	Courtney Smith	Eloise Pointon	Nelson Ede	WJBCC 2017 (16th)
2017–18	Bridget Becker	Jessica Smith	Holly Thompson	Emma Sutherland			NZWCC 2017 (gold)
2017–18	Bridget Becker	Jessica Smith	Thivya Jeyaranjan	Holly Thompson	Emma Sutherland	Nelson Ede	PACC 2017 (5th)
2017–18	Jessica Smith	Holly Thompson	Emma Sutherland	Courtney Smith	Mhairi-Bronté Duncan	Nelson Ede, Peter Becker	WJBCC 2018 (4th)
2018–19	Jessica Smith	Holly Thompson	Mhairi-Bronté Duncan	Courtney Smith			NZWCC 2018 (silver)
2018–19	Jessica Smith	Holly Thompson	Mhairi-Bronté Duncan	Courtney Smith	Lucy Neilson	Nelson Ede	WJBCC 2019 (Jan) (12th)
2019–20	Jessica Smith	Holly Thompson	Mhairi-Bronté Duncan	Jennifer Stewart			NZWCC 2019 (silver)
2020–21	Jessica Smith	Holly Thompson	Jennifer Stewart	Ruby Kinney			NZWCC 2020 (silver)
2021–22	Bridget Becker	Natalie Thurlow	Holly Thompson	Jennifer Stewart	Ruby Kinney		NZWCC 2021 (gold)
2022–23	Jessica Smith	Holly Thompson	Natalie Thurlow	Bridget Becker			NZWCC 2022 (gold)
2022–23	Jessica Smith	Holly Thompson	Natalie Thurlow	Bridget Becker	Ruby Kinney	Nelson Ede	PCCC 2022 (5th)
2022–23	Jessica Smith	Holly Thompson	Bridget Becker	Natalie Thurlow	Ruby Kinney	Nelson Ede	WWCC 2023 (13th)
2023–24	Jessica Smith	Holly Thompson	Bridget Becker	Natalie Thurlow			NZWCC 2023 (gold)
2023–24	Jessica Smith	Courtney Smith	Bridget Becker	Natalie Thurlow	Holly Thompson		PCCC 2023 (5th); WWCC 2024

=== Mixed team ===
Season	Skip	Third	Second	Lead	Coach	Events
2015–16	Matthew Neilson	Holly Thompson	Ben Smith	Courtney Smith	Peter Becker	WYOG 2016 (13th)
2022–23	Brett Sargon	Holly Thompson	Kieran Ford	Shay Bijoux		NZMxCC 2022 (gold)
2023–24	Brett Sargon	Holly Thompson	Kieran Ford	Olivia Russell		NZMxCC 2023 (silver)

=== Mixed doubles ===
Season	Female	Male	Coach	Events
2012–13	Holly Thompson, Tash Whyte	Josh Whyte		NZMDCC 2012 (13th)
2013–14	Holly Thompson	Josh Fogo		NZMDCC 2013 (7th)
2014–15	Holly Thompson	Josh Fogo		NZMDCC 2014 (10th)
2015–16	Holly Thompson	Josh Fogo		NZMDCC 2016 (10th)
2015–16	(New Zealand) Holly Thompson	(Canada) Sterling Middleton	Peter Becker	WYOG 2016 (5th)
2016–17	Holly Thompson	Josh Fogo		NZMDCC 2016 (4th)
2017–18	Holly Thompson	Josh Fogo		NZMDCC 2017 (7th)
2018–19	Holly Thompson	Anton Hood		NZMDCC 2018 (4th)
2019–20	Holly Thompson	Anton Hood		NZMDCC 2019 (silver)
2020–21	Holly Thompson	Anton Hood		NZMDCC 2020 (5th)
