= Courtney Smith (curler) =

New Zealand curler (born 1999)

- Curler ♀
- Born: 13 November 1999 (age 27); Ranfurly, New Zealand

Team
- Curling club: Dunedin CC, Dunedin
- Skip: Jessica Smith
- Third: Courtney Smith
- Second: Bridget Becker
- Lead: Holly Thompson
- Alternate: Natalie Thurlow
- Mixed doubles partner: Anton Hood

Curling career
- Member Association: New Zealand
- World Championship: 1 (2024)
- World Mixed Doubles Championship: 2 (2021, 2024)
- Pan Continental Championship: 1 (2023)
- Other appearances: Youth Olympic Games: 1 (2016)
Medal record
Curling
New Zealand Women's Championship
Silver medal – second place	2018 Naseby
Silver medal – second place	2021 Naseby
Silver medal – second place	2023 Naseby
Bronze medal – third place	2016 Naseby
Bronze medal – third place	2019 Naseby
Bronze medal – third place	2020 Naseby
New Zealand Mixed Championship
Gold medal – first place	2023 Naseby
New Zealand Mixed Doubles Championship
Gold medal – first place	2022 Naseby
Gold medal – first place	2023 Naseby
Gold medal – first place	2025 Naseby
Silver medal – second place	2017 Naseby
Silver medal – second place	2024 Naseby
Bronze medal – third place	2018 Naseby
Bronze medal – third place	2019 Naseby
Bronze medal – third place	2020 Naseby

Courtney Smith (born 13 November 1999) is a New Zealand curler from Naseby.

At the international level, she competed at the World Mixed Doubles Championship 2021 (with Anton Hood, finishing 12th) and at the 2016 Winter Youth Olympics (finishing 13th with the New Zealand mixed team, and 17th in mixed doubles with Henwy Lochmann from Switzerland).

At the national level, she is a New Zealand mixed team and mixed doubles champion curler.

== Personal life ==
Smith is employed as a registered nurse.

== Teams and events ==
=== Women's ===
Season	Skip	Third	Second	Lead	Alternate	Coach	Events
2013—14	Hamish Walker	Bailey Dowling	Courtney Smith	Tash Whyte			NZWCC 2014 (out of rank)
2014—15	Eloise Pointon	Courtney Smith	Elle Steele	Tash Whyte			NZWCC 2015 (4th)
2015—16	Courtney Smith	Mhairi-Bronté Duncan	Eloise Pointon	Sophie Tran			NZWCC 2016 (bronze)
2016—17	Jessica Smith	Holly Thompson	Emma Sutherland	Courtney Smith	Eloise Pointon	Nelson Ede	WJBCC 2017 (16th)
2017—18	Jessica Smith	Holly Thompson	Emma Sutherland	Courtney Smith	Mhairi-Bronté Duncan	Nelson Ede, Peter Becker	WJBCC 2018 (4th)
2017—18	Jessica Smith	Holly Thompson	Mhairi-Bronté Duncan	Courtney Smith			NZWCC 2018 (silver)
2018—19	Jessica Smith	Holly Thompson	Mhairi-Bronté Duncan	Courtney Smith	Lucy Neilson	Nelson Ede	WJBCC 2019 (Jan) (12th)
2018—19	Courtney Smith	Lucy Neilson	Zoe Harman	Courtney Smith	Ruby Kinney		NZWCC 2019 (bronze)
2019—20	Courtney Smith	Grace Bishop	Zoe Harman	Lucy Neilson	Rachael Pitts	Dave Watt	WJBCC 2019 (Dec) (5th)
2019—20	Courtney Smith	Mhairi-Bronté Duncan	Zoe Harman	Rachael Pitts			NZWCC 2020 (bronze)
2020—21	Courtney Smith	Mhairi-Bronté Duncan	Rachael Pitts	Rebecca Long			NZWCC 2021 (silver)
2023—24	Courtney Smith	Mhairi-Bronté Duncan	Eleanor Adviento	Michelle Bong			NZWCC 2023 (silver)
2023—24	Jessica Smith	Courtney Smith	Bridget Becker	Natalie Thurlow	Holly Thompson		PCCC 2023 (5th); WWCC 2024

=== Mixed ===
Season	Skip	Third	Second	Lead	Coach	Events
2015–16	Matthew Neilson	Holly Thompson	Ben Smith	Courtney Smith	Peter Becker	WYOG 2016 (13th)
2023–24	Dave Watt	Courtney Smith	Will Sheard	Mhairi-Bronté Duncan		NZMxCC 2023 (gold)

=== Mixed doubles ===
Season	Female	Male	Coach	Events
2015–16	(New Zealand) Courtney Smith	(Switzerland) Henwy Lochmann	Paddy Kaeser	WYOG 2016 (17th)
2016–17	Courtney Smith	Anton Hood		NZMDCC 2016 (6th)
2017–18	Courtney Smith	Anton Hood		NZMDCC 2017 (silver)
2018–19	Courtney Smith	Hamish Walker		NZMDCC 2018 (bronze)
2019–20	Courtney Smith	Hamish Walker		NZMDCC 2019 (bronze)
2020–21	Courtney Smith	Dave Watt		NZMDCC 2020 (bronze)
2020–21	Courtney Smith	Anton Hood		WMDCC 2021 (12th)
2022–23	Courtney Smith	Anton Hood		NZMDCC 2022 (gold)
2023–24	Courtney Smith	Anton Hood	David Ramsay	NZMDCC 2023 (gold); WMDCC 2024 ()
