= New Zealand Women's Curling Championship =

The New Zealand Women's Curling Championship is the national championship of women's curling in New Zealand. It has been held annually since 2005 and organized by New Zealand Curling Association. From 1994 to 2004 the national champions were the winners of the Wendorf Rock, and the event was open to both genders. Some winning teams had men's and women's players.

== List of champions and medallists ==
The past champions and medalists of the event are listed as follows (in order – fourth/skip, third, second, lead, alternate):

=== The Wendorf Rock (champions only) ===
Host arena: Dunedin Curling Club.

Year	Champion club	Champion team
1994	Taieri	Edwin Harley, Allan McLean, P Buchanan, A Harley
1995	Kyeburn	Fen Greer, Helen Greer, Becky Greer, Helen Rutherford (Note: Women’s only team)
1996	Taieri	Edwin Harley, Allan McLean, P Buchanan, H Casey
1997	Ranfurly	Sean Becker, Helen Greer, Becky Greer, Warren Dobson
1998	Dunedin	Jim Allan, Ross Stevens, Patsy Inder, J Gamble
1999	Ranfurly	Peter Becker, Merv Jamieson, Darren Carson, Sean Becker
2000	Ranfurly	Peter Becker, Merv Jamieson, Darren Carson, Sean Becker
2001	Auckland	Hans Frauenlob, Paul Minett, Tom Telfer, Lorne De Pape
2002	Maniototo	Sean Becker, Warren Dobson, Karen Rawcliffe, O Rawcliffe
2003	Dunedin	Dan Mustapic, Jim Allan, Allan McLean, M McLean
2004	Maniototo	Warren Dobson, Sean Becker, Karen Rawcliffe, C Andrews

=== New Zealand Curling Championship — Women ===
Year	Dates Host city, arena	Champion	Runner-up	Bronze
2005		Bridget Becker, Brydie Donald, Natalie Campbell, Catherine Inder	Natasha Dallow, Heather Jamieson, Abby Pyle, Marisa Jones	
2006		Bridget Becker, Brydie Donald, Natalie Campbell, Catherine Inder	Cass Becker, Marisa Jones, Abby Pyle, Heather Jamieson	
2007		Bridget Becker, Brydie Donald, Abby Pyle, Cass Becker	Linda Geary, Lucy Harris, Jacinda Kerr, Lois Allen	
2008	31 July — 3 August; Naseby, MCI	Bridget Becker, Brydie Donald, Cassie Becker, Linda Geary	Natalie Campbell, Kylie Petherick, Marissa Jones, Catherine Rissel	Liz Matthews, Christine Bewick, Pauline Farra, Cathy Fenton
2009	2—5 July; Dunedin, Dunedin Ice Stadium	Bridget Becker, Brydie Donald, Marisa Jones, Linda Geary	Natalie Campbell, Kylie Petherick, Lana Williams, Lucienne Langille	Wendy Becker, Liz Matthews, Christine Bewick, Carolyn Cooney
2010	2—4 July; Naseby, MCI	Bridget Becker, Brydie Donald, Marisa Jones, Natalie Campbell	Chelsea Farley, Thivya Jeyaranjan, Tessa Farley, Emily Whelan	Wendy Becker, Elizabeth Matthews, Christine Bewick, Pauline Farra
2011	1—3 July; Naseby, MCI	Brydie Donald, Natalie Campbell, Marisa Jones, Jess Zinsli, alternate: Katie Bauer	Wendy Becker, Christine Diack, Helen Greer, Carolyn Cooney	Liz Matthews, Christine Bewick, Kathy-Jo Dobson, Megan Kliegl, alternate: Ashleigh Black
2012	29 June — 1 July; Naseby, MCI	Bridget Becker, Brydie Donald, Marisa Jones, Natalie Thurlow	Chelsea Farley, Thivya Jeyaranjan, Tessa Farley, Kelsi Heath, alternate: Tash Whyte	Wendy Becker, Liz Matthews, Eleanor Adviento, Helen Greer
2013	12—14 July; Dunedin, Dunedin Ice Stadium	Wendy Becker, Brydie Donald, Kelsi Heath, Kathy-Jo Dobson	Thivya Jeyaranjan (fourth), Chelsea Farley (skip), Tessa Farley, Eleanor Adviento	—
2014	11—13 July; Naseby, MCI	Wendy Becker, Liz Matthews, Cass Becker, Kathy-Jo Dobson	Chelsea Farley, Thivya Jeyaranjan, Tessa Farley, Eleanor Adviento	Bridget Becker, Marisa Jones, Kelsi Heath, Waverley Taylor
2015	2—5 July; Naseby, MCI	Chelsea Farley, Thivya Jeyaranjan, Tessa Farley, Eleanor Adviento	Liz Matthews, Waverley Taylor, Glenys Taylor, Emily Whelan	Wendy Becker, Bridget Becker, Jessica Smith, Holly Thompson
2016	7—10 July; Naseby, MCI	Thivya Jeyaranjan (fourth), Chelsea Farley (skip), Tessa Farley, Eleanor Adviento	Jessica Smith, Holly Thompson, Waverley Taylor, Bridget Becker, alternate: Anna de Boer	Courtney Smith, Mhairi-Bronté Duncan, Eloise Pointon, Sophie Tran
2017	7—9 July; Dunedin, Dunedin Ice Stadium	Bridget Becker, Jessica Smith, Holly Thompson, Emma Sutherland	Chelsea Farley, Thivya Jeyaranjan, Tessa Farley, Eleanor Adviento	Mhairi-Bronté Duncan, Grace Apuwai-Bishop, Michelle Bong, Temika Apuwai-Bishop
2018	5—8 July; Naseby, MCI	Bridget Becker, Natalie Thurlow, Abby Pyle, Eloise Pointon	Jessica Smith, Holly Thompson, Mhairi-Bronté Duncan, Courtney Smith	Thivya Jeyaranjan (fourth), Chelsea Farley (skip), Tessa Farley, Grace Apuwai-Bishop
2019	4—7 July; Naseby, MCI	Bridget Becker, Natalie Thurlow, Cass Becker, Eloise Pointon	Jessica Smith, Holly Thompson, Mhairi-Bronté Duncan, Jennifer Stewart	Courtney Smith, Lucy Neilson, Zoe Harman, Anna Stuart, alternate: Ruby Kinney
2020	30 July — 2 August; Naseby, MCI	Bridget Becker, Natalie Thurlow, Thivya Jeyaranjan, Eloise Pointon, alternate: Olivia Russell	Jessica Smith, Holly Thompson, Jennifer Stewart, Ruby Kinney	Courtney Smith, Mhairi-Bronté Duncan, Zoe Harman, Rachael Pitts
2021	10—13 June; Naseby, MCI	Bridget Becker, Natalie Thurlow, Holly Thompson, Jennifer Stewart, alternate: Ruby Kinney	Courtney Smith, Mhairi-Bronté Duncan, Rachael Pitts, Rebecca Long	Grace Apuwai-Bishop, Temika Apuwai-Bishop, Lucy Neilson, Charlotte Hutton-Atkins
2022	16—19 June; Naseby, MCI	Jessica Smith, Holly Thompson, Natalie Thurlow, Bridget Becker	Eleanor Adviento, Thivya Turner, Tessa Farley, Ariel Weber	Michelle Bong, Ruby Kinney, Olivia Russell, Lucy Neilson
2023	14—18 June; Naseby, MCI	Jessica Smith, Holly Thompson, Bridget Becker, Natalie Thurlow	Courtney Smith, Mhairi-Bronté Duncan, Eleanor Adviento, Michelle Bong	Rachael Pitts, Lucy Neilson (skip), Ruby Kinney, Olivia Russell

== Medal record for curlers ==
(2005–2023)

Curler	Gold	Silver	Bronze
Bridget Becker	14	1	2
Natalie Thurlow (Natalie Campbell)	11	2	
Brydie Donald	9		
Holly Thompson	4	4	1
Marisa Jones (Marissa Jones)	4	3	1
Cass Becker (Cassie Becker)	4	1	
Thivya Turner (Jeyaranjan)	3	6	1
Jessica Smith	3	4	1
Eloise Pointon	3		1
Tessa Farley	2	6	1
Eleanor Adviento	2	5	1
Chelsea Farley	2	5	1
Abby Pyle	2	2	
Wendy Becker	2	1	4
Linda Geary	2	1	
Kathy-Jo Dobson	2		1
Catherine Inder	2		
Jennifer Stewart	1	2	
Liz Matthews (Elizabeth Matthews)	1	1	5
Ruby Kinney	1	1	3
Kelsi Heath	1	1	1
Olivia Russell	1		2
Katie Bauer	1		
Emma Sutherland	1		
Jess Zinsli	1		
Mhairi-Bronté Duncan		4	3
Courtney Smith		3	3
Waverley Taylor		2	1
Heather Jamieson		2	
Kylie Petherick		2	
Emily Whelan		2	
Michelle Bong		1	2
Rachael Pitts		1	2
Carolyn Cooney		1	1
Helen Greer		1	1
Lois Allen		1	
Natasha Dallow		1	
Anna de Boer		1	
Christine Diack		1	
Lucy Harris		1	
Jacinda Kerr		1	
Lucienne Langille		1	
Rebecca Long		1	
Catherine Rissel		1	
Glenys Taylor		1	
Tash Whyte		1	
Lana Williams		1	
Ariel Weber		1	
Christine Bewick			4
Lucy Neilson			4
Grace Apuwai-Bishop			3
Temika Apuwai-Bishop			3
Pauline Farra			2
Zoe Harman			2
Ashleigh Black			1
Cathy Fenton			1
Charlotte Hutton-Atkins			1
Megan Kliegl			1
Anna Stuart			1
Sophie Tran			1

== See also ==
- New Zealand Men's Curling Championship
- New Zealand Mixed Doubles Curling Championship
- New Zealand Mixed Curling Championship
- New Zealand Junior Mixed Doubles Championship
