= Brett Sargon =

New Zealand curler (born 1991)

- Curler
- Born: 3 December 1991 (age 34); Auckland, New Zealand

Team
- Skip: Anton Hood
- Third: Ben Smith
- Second: Brett Sargon
- Lead: Hunter Walker
- Alternate: Jared Palanuik
- Mixed doubles partner: Mhairi-Bronté Duncan

Curling career
- Member Association: New Zealand
- World Championship: 2 (2023, 2024)
- World Mixed Doubles Championship: 1 (2018)
- World Mixed Championship: 2 (2016, 2024)
- Pacific-Asia Championship: 4 (2014, 2015, 2017, 2019)
- Pan Continental Championship: 3 (2022, 2023, 2024)
- Other appearances: Pacific-Asia Junior Championships: 1 (2013)
Medal record
Curling
New Zealand Men's Championship
Gold medal – first place	2014 Naseby
Gold medal – first place	2016 Naseby
Gold medal – first place	2020 Naseby
Silver medal – second place	2017 Dunedin
Silver medal – second place	2021 Naseby
Bronze medal – third place	2015 Naseby
Bronze medal – third place	2018 Naseby
Bronze medal – third place	2022 Naseby
New Zealand Mixed Doubles Championship
Silver medal – second place	2020 Naseby
Bronze medal – third place	2015 Dunedin
Bronze medal – third place	2016 Naseby
Bronze medal – third place	2017 Naseby
Pacific-Asia Junior Championships
Bronze medal – third place	2013 Tokoro

Brett Sargon (born 3 December 1991 in Auckland, New Zealand) is a New Zealand curler.

At the national level, he is a three-time New Zealand men's champion curler (2014, 2016, 2020) and two-time New Zealand mixed champion curler (2016, 2017).

== Personal life ==
Sargon works as a tech sales and business developer.

== Teams ==
=== Men's ===
Season	Skip	Third	Second	Lead	Alternate	Coach	Events
2010–11	Kieran Ford	Brett Sargon	Dylan Ford	Ian Ford			NZMCC 2011 (6th)
2012–13	Willie Miller	Brett Sargon	Liam Dowling	Luke Steele	Garion Long	Liz Matthews	PAJCC 2013 (bronze)
2013–14	Sean Becker	Scott Becker	Rupert Jones	Brett Sargon			NZMCC 2014 (gold)
2014–15	Scott Becker (fourth)	Kenny Thomson (skip)	Rupert Jones	Warren Dobson	Brett Sargon		PACC 2014 (5th)
2014–15	Hans Frauenlob	Dan Mustapic	Brett Sargon	Kieran Ford			NZMCC 2015 (bronze)
2015–16	Peter de Boer	Sean Becker	Scott Becker	Brett Sargon			PACC 2015 (4th)
2015–16	Peter de Boer	Brett Sargon	Kenny Thomson	Phil Dowling			NZMCC 2016 (gold)
2016–17	Peter de Boer	Brett Sargon	Warren Kearney	Phil Dowling			NZMCC 2017 (silver)
2017–18	Sean Becker	Warren Dobson	Brett Sargon	Anton Hood	Hamish Walker	Peter Becker	PACC 2017 (5th)
2017–18	Anton Hood (fourth)	Brett Sargon (skip)	Ben Smith	Matthew Neilson			NZMCC 2018 (bronze)
2019–20	Scott Becker	Anton Hood	Brett Sargon	Warren Dobson			PACC 2019 (4th)

=== Mixed ===
Season	Skip	Third	Second	Lead	Alternate	Coach	Events
2009–10	Brett Sargon (fourth)	Brittany Taylor	Kieran Ford (skip)	Eleanor Adviento			NZMxCC 2010 (bronze)
2010–11	Kieran Ford	Waverley Taylor	Brett Sargon	Maria Anderson			NZMxCC 2011 (4th)
2011–12	Kieran Ford	Eleanor Adviento	Brett Sargon	Kelsi Heath			NZMxCC 2012 (silver)
2012–13	Brett Sargon (fourth)	Kenny Thomson	Eleanor Adviento (skip)	Robert Giles	Beth Gibbs		NZMxCC 2013 (4th)
2014–15	Brett Sargon (fourth)	Eleanor Adviento	Kieran Ford (skip)	Emily Whelan			NZMxCC 2015 (bronze)
2015–16	Brett Sargon	Eleanor Adviento	Kieran Ford	Thivya Jeyaranjan			NZMxCC 2016 (gold)
2016–17	Brett Sargon	Thivya Jeyaranjan	Kieran Ford	Emily Rose Whelan		Liz Matthews	WMxCC 2016 (9th)
2016–17	Brett Sargon	Eleanor Adviento	Kieran Ford	Thivya Jeyaranjan			NZMxCC 2017 (gold)
2017–18	Brett Sargon	Thivya Jeyaranjan	Kieran Ford	Jennifer Jack			NZMxCC 2018 (4th)

=== Mixed doubles ===
Season	Male	Female	Coach	Events
2012–13	Brett Sargon	Eleanor Adviento		NZMDCC 2012 (5th)
2013–14	Brett Sargon	Eleanor Adviento		NZMDCC 2013 (4th)
2015–16	Brett Sargon	Eleanor Adviento		NZMDCC 2015 (bronze)
2016–17	Brett Sargon	Eleanor Adviento		NZMDCC 2016 (bronze)
2017–18	Brett Sargon	Eleanor Adviento	Michael Moss	NZMDCC 2017 (bronze); WMDCC 2018 (39th)
2018–19	Brett Sargon	Thivya Jeyaranjan		NZMDCC 2018 (12th)
2019–20	Brett Sargon	Mhairi-Bronté Duncan		NZMDCC 2019 (9th)
2020–21	Brett Sargon	Mhairi-Bronté Duncan		NZMDCC 2020 (silver)
2021–22	Brett Sargon	Mhairi-Bronté Duncan		OQE 2021 (13th)
