= Mhairi-Bronté Duncan =

New Zealand curler (born 1997)

- Curler
- Born: 25 November 1997 (age 28); Dunedin, New Zealand

Team
- Curling club: Dunedin CC, Dunedin
- Skip: Courtney Smith
- Third: Mhairi-Bronté Duncan
- Second: Rachael Pitts
- Lead: Rebecca Long
- Mixed doubles partner: Brett Sargon

Curling career
- Member Association: New Zealand
- Other appearances: World Mixed Championship: 1 (2019)
Medal record
Curling
New Zealand Women's Championship
Silver medal – second place	2018 Naseby
Silver medal – second place	2019 Naseby
Silver medal – second place	2021 Naseby
Bronze medal – third place	2016 Naseby
Bronze medal – third place	2017 Dunedin
Bronze medal – third place	2020 Naseby
New Zealand Mixed Doubles Championship
Silver medal – second place	2020 Naseby

Mhairi-Bronté Duncan (born 25 November 1997) is a New Zealand female curler.

== Teams and events ==
=== Women's ===
Season	Skip	Third	Second	Lead	Alternate	Coach	Events
2015—16	Courtney Smith	Mhairi-Bronté Duncan	Eloise Pointon	Sophie Tran			NZWCC 2016 (bronze)
2016—17	Mhairi-Bronté Duncan	Grace Apuwai-Bishop	Michelle Bong	Temika Apuwai-Bishop			NZWCC 2017 (bronze)
2017—18	Jessica Smith	Holly Thompson	Emma Sutherland	Courtney Smith	Mhairi-Bronté Duncan	Nelson Ede, Peter Becker	WJBCC 2018 (4th)
2017—18	Jessica Smith	Holly Thompson	Mhairi-Bronté Duncan	Courtney Smith			NZWCC 2018 (silver)
2018—19	Jessica Smith	Holly Thompson	Mhairi-Bronté Duncan	Courtney Smith	Lucy Neilson	Nelson Ede	WJBCC 2019 (Jan) (12th)
2018—19	Jessica Smith	Holly Thompson	Mhairi-Bronté Duncan	Jennifer Stewart			NZWCC 2019 (silver)
2019—20	Courtney Smith	Mhairi-Bronté Duncan	Zoe Harman	Rachael Pitts			NZWCC 2020 (bronze)
2020—21	Courtney Smith	Mhairi-Bronté Duncan	Rachael Pitts	Rebecca Long			NZWCC 2021 (silver)

=== Mixed ===
Season	Skip	Third	Second	Lead	Coach	Events
2019–20	Mhairi-Bronté Duncan (fourth)	Benjamin Frew	Thivya Jeyaranjan (skip)	Kieran Ford	Peter Becker	WMxCC 2019 (28th)

=== Mixed doubles ===
Season	Female	Male	Events
2015–16	Mhairi-Bronté Duncan	Alex Greer	NZMDCC 2015 (12th)
2018–19	Mhairi-Bronté Duncan	Nelson Ede	NZMDCC 2018 (8th)
2019–20	Mhairi-Bronté Duncan	Brett Sargon	NZMDCC 2019 (9th)
2020–21	Mhairi-Bronté Duncan	Brett Sargon	NZMDCC 2020 (silver)
2021–22	Mhairi-Bronté Duncan	Brett Sargon	OQE 2021 (13th)
