= Darren Carson =

New Zealand male curler

- Curler ♂

Team
- Curling club: Ranfurly CC, Ranfurly, New Zealand

Curling career
- Member Association: New Zealand
- World Championship: 1 (1999)
- Pacific-Asia Championship: 4 (1995, 1997, 1998, 1999)
Medal record
Curling
Pacific Championships
Gold medal – first place	1998 Qualicum Beach
Bronze medal – third place	1995 Tokoro
Bronze medal – third place	1997 Karuizawa
Bronze medal – third place	1999 Tokoro
New Zealand Men's Championship
Gold medal – first place	1999
Gold medal – first place	2000

Darren Carson is a New Zealand curler.

At the international level, he is a 1998 Pacific champion curler.

At the national level, he is a two-time New Zealand men's champion (1999, 2000).

As of 2009, he was a President of the New Zealand Curling Association.

== Teams ==
Season	Skip	Third	Second	Lead	Alternate	Coach	Events
1995–96	Peter Becker	Sean Becker	Allan McLean	Lorne De Pape	Darren Carson	Edwin Harley	PCC 1995 (bronze)
1997–98	Sean Becker	Hans Frauenlob	Ross A. Stevens	Lorne De Pape	Darren Carson	Edwin Harley	PCC 1997 (bronze)
1998–99	Sean Becker	Hans Frauenlob	Jim Allan	Lorne De Pape	Darren Carson	Edwin Harley	PCC 1998 (gold); WCC 1999 (10th)
1998–99	Peter Becker	Merv Jamieson	Darren Carson	Sean Becker			NZMCC 1999 (gold)
1999–00	Sean Becker	Hans Frauenlob	Jim Allan	Lorne De Pape	Darren Carson	Edwin Harley	PCC 1999 (bronze)
1999–00	Peter Becker	Merv Jamieson	Darren Carson	Sean Becker			NZMCC 2000 (gold)
