= Ruby Kinney =

New Zealand curler

- Curler ♀

Team
- Skip: Bridget Becker
- Third: Holly Thompson
- Second: Rachael Pitts
- Lead: Ruby Kinney
- Alternate: Natalie Thurlow

Curling career
- Member Association: New Zealand
- World Championship: 1 (2023)
- Pan Continental Championship: 2 (2022, 2025)
Medal record
Curling
New Zealand Women's Championship
Gold medal – first place	2021 Dunedin
Silver medal – second place	2020 Naseby
Bronze medal – third place	2019 Naseby
Bronze medal – third place	2022 Naseby
Bronze medal – third place	2023 Naseby

Ruby Kinney is a New Zealand curler

At the international level, she competed at the 2023 World Women's Championship (first-ever Worlds for the New Zealand women's curling team) and the 2022 Pan Continental Championships.

At the national level, she is a New Zealand women's champion curler.

== Teams and events ==
=== Women's ===
Season	Skip	Third	Second	Lead	Alternate	Coach	Events
2018–19	Charlotte Hutton-Atkins	Ruby Kinney	—	—			NZJCC 2018 (bronze)
2019–20	Courtney Smith	Lucy Neilson	Zoe Harman	Anna Stuart	Ruby Kinney		NZWCC 2019 (bronze)
2019–20	Ruby Kinney	Danielle Bain	Anna Clarke	Charlotte Hutton-Atkins			NZJCC 2019 (silver)
2020–21	Jessica Smith	Holly Thompson	Jennifer Stewart	Ruby Kinney			NZWCC 2020 (silver)
2021–22	Bridget Becker	Natalie Thurlow	Holly Thompson	Jennifer Stewart	Ruby Kinney		NZWCC 2021 (gold)
2022–23	Michelle Bong	Ruby Kinney	Olivia Russell	Lucy Neilson			NZWCC 2022 (bronze)
2022–23	Jessica Smith	Holly Thompson	Natalie Thurlow	Bridget Becker	Ruby Kinney	Nelson Ede	PCCC 2022 (5th)
2022–23	Grace Apuwai-Bishop	Rachael Pitts	Ruby Kinney	Lucy Neilson	Temika Apuwai-Bishop	Nelson Ede, Eleanor Adviento	WJBCC 2022 (Dec) (13th)
2022–23	Jessica Smith	Holly Thompson	Bridget Becker	Natalie Thurlow	Ruby Kinney	Nelson Ede	WWCC 2023 (13th)
2023–24	Rachael Pitts (fourth)	Lucy Neilson (skip)	Ruby Kinney	Olivia Russell			NZWCC 2023 (bronze)
2024–25	Rachael Pitts	Ruby Kinney	Olivia Russell	Lucy Neilson			NZWCC 2024 (6th)

=== Mixed team ===
Season	Skip	Third	Second	Lead	Events
2024–25	Hunter Walker	Rachael Pitts	Murray Pitts	Ruby Kinney	NZMxCC 2024 (5th)

=== Mixed doubles ===
Season	Female	Male	Events
2020–21	Ruby Kinney	Hunter Walker	NZMDCC 2020 (5th)
2022–23	Ruby Kinney	Hunter Walker	NZMDCC 2022 (5th)
2024–25	Ruby Kinney	Hunter Walker	NZMDCC 2024 (4th)
