= Natalie Thurlow =

New Zealand curler

- Curler
- Born: Natalie Campbell; Clyde, New Zealand

Team
- Curling club: Alexandra CC, Auckland CC (Auckland)
- Skip: Bridget Becker
- Third: Holly Thompson
- Second: Rachael Pitts
- Lead: Ruby Kinney
- Alternate: Natalie Thurlow
- Mixed doubles partner: Warren Dobson

Curling career
- Member Association: New Zealand
- World Championship: 2 (2023, 2024)
- World Mixed Doubles Championship: 3 (2012, 2013, 2022)
- Pacific-Asia Championship: 12 (1998, 1999, 2000, 2001, 2002, 2003, 2004, 2005, 2006, 2009, 2010, 2011)
- Pan Continental Championship: 2 (2022, 2023)
Medal record
Curling
Pacific Championships
Silver medal – second place	1998 Qualicum Beach
Bronze medal – third place	1999 Tokoro
Bronze medal – third place	2000 Esquimalt
Bronze medal – third place	2002 Queenstown
Bronze medal – third place	2003 Aomori
Bronze medal – third place	2011 Nanjing
New Zealand Women's Championship
Gold medal – first place	2005
Gold medal – first place	2006
Silver medal – second place	2008 Naseby
Silver medal – second place	2009 Dunedin
Gold medal – first place	2010 Naseby
Gold medal – first place	2011 Naseby
Gold medal – first place	2012 Naseby
Gold medal – first place	2018 Naseby
Gold medal – first place	2019 Naseby
Gold medal – first place	2020 Naseby
Gold medal – first place	2021 Naseby
Gold medal – first place	2022 Naseby
New Zealand Mixed Doubles Championship
Bronze medal – third place	2010 Naseby
Silver medal – second place	2011 Dunedin
Gold medal – first place	2012 Naseby
Gold medal – first place	2013 Naseby

Natalie Thurlow (née Campbell; born 1982) is a New Zealand curler from Becks.

At the international level she is runner-up (1998) and five-time bronze medallist (1999, 2000, 2002, 2003, 2011) of Pacific Curling Championships.

At the national level she is six-time New Zealand women's curling champion (2005, 2006, 2010, 2011, 2012, 2018) and two-time New Zealand mixed doubles curling champion (2012, 2013).

== Personal life ==
Her father is curler and coach John Campbell, they played together many times as a mixed doubles team at the national championships and World Championship 2012.

Thurlow is employed as a farmer.

== Teams and events ==
=== Women's ===
Season	Skip	Third	Second	Lead	Alternate	Coach	Events
1998–99	Lisa Anderson	Kylie Petherick	Karen Rawcliffe	Bridget Becker	Natalie Campbell	Edwin Harley	PCC 1998 (silver)
1999–00	Lisa Anderson	Kylie Petherick	Karen Rawcliffe	Bridget Becker	Natalie Campbell	Peter Becker	PCC 1999 (bronze)
2000–01	Lisa Anderson	Kylie Petherick	Karen Rawcliffe	Bridget Becker	Natalie Campbell	Peter Becker, Sharon Delver	PCC 2000 (bronze)
2001–02	Bridget Becker	Kylie Petherick	Natalie Campbell	Catherine Inder		Peter Becker	PCC 2001 (4th)
2002–03	Bridget Becker	Helen Greer	Natalie Campbell	Kylie Petherick	Catherine Inder	Peter Becker	PCC 2002 (bronze)
2002–03	Natalie Campbell	Catherine Vaka	Brydie Donald	Natasha Dallow	Marisa Jones	Liz Matthews	WJBCC 2003 (6th)
2003–04	Bridget Becker	Natalie Campbell	Brydie Donald	Sandra Heaney	Catherine Inder	Sharon Delver, John Campbell	PCC 2003 (bronze)
2004–05	Bridget Becker	Natalie Campbell	Brydie Donald	Catherine Inder	Marisa Jones (PCC)	Sharon Delver	PCC 2004 (4th); NZWCC 2005 (gold)
2005–06	Bridget Becker	Brydie Donald	Natalie Campbell	Catherine Inder	Marisa Jones (PCC)	Peter Becker	PCC 2005 (4th); NZWCC 2006 (gold)
2006–07	Bridget Becker	Brydie Donald	Natalie Campbell	Catherine Inder	Marisa Jones	Peter Becker	PCC 2006 (4th)
2007–08	Natalie Campbell	Kylie Petherick	Marisa Jones	Catherine Rissel			NZWCC 2008 (silver)
2008–09	Natalie Campbell	Kylie Petherick	Lana Williams	Lucienne Langille			NZWCC 2009 (silver)
2009–10	Bridget Becker	Brydie Donald	Marisa Jones	Natalie Campbell		Peter Becker	PCC 2009 (4th); NZWCC 2010 (gold)
2010–11	Brydie Donald	Bridget Becker	Marisa Jones	Natalie Campbell	Katie Bauer	Peter Becker	PCC 2010 (4th)
2010–11	Brydie Donald	Natalie Campbell	Marisa Jones	Jess Zinsli	Katie Bauer		NZWCC 2011 (gold)
2011–12	Bridget Becker	Brydie Donald	Marisa Jones	Natalie Thurlow			NZWCC 2012 (gold)
2017–18	Bridget Becker	Natalie Thurlow	Abby Pyle	Eloise Pointon			NZWCC 2018 (gold)
2018–19	Bridget Becker	Natalie Thurlow	Abby Peddie	Eloise Pointon	Jessica Smith	Peter de Boer	2019 WQE (8th)

=== Mixed doubles ===
Season	Female	Male	Coach	Events
2009–10	Natalie Campbell	John Campbell		NZMDCC 2009 (5th)
2010–11	Natalie Campbell	John Campbell		NZMDCC 2010 (bronze)
2011–12	Natalie Campbell	John Campbell	Dan Thurlow (WMDCC)	NZMDCC 2011 (silver); WMDCC 2012 (10th)
2012–13	Natalie Thurlow	Hans Frauenlob		NZMDCC 2012 (gold)
2012–13	Natalie Campbell	Hans Frauenlob		WMDCC 2013 (5th)
2013–14	Natalie Thurlow	Hans Frauenlob		NZMDCC 2013 (gold)
2014–15	Natalie Thurlow	Hans Frauenlob		NZMDCC 2014 (10th)
2018–19	Natalie Thurlow	Kieran Ford		NZMDCC 2018 (5th)
