= New Zealand Mixed Doubles Curling Championship =

The New Zealand Mixed Doubles Curling Championship is the national championship of mixed doubles curling (one man and one woman) in New Zealand. It has been held annually since 2007 and organized by New Zealand Curling Association.

== List of champions and medallists ==
Team line-ups shows in order: woman, man, coach (if exists).

Year	Host city, arena Dates	Champion	Runner-up	Bronze
2007	Naseby, MCI; 26–28 October 2007	W: Bridget Becker; M: Sean Becker	W: Brydie Donald; M: Scott Becker	W: Kylie Petherick; M: Murray Petherick
2008	Naseby, MCI; 17–19 October 2008	W: Brydie Donald; M: Scott Becker	W: Bridget Becker; M: Sean Becker	W: Cass Becker; M: Warren Dobson
2009	Naseby, MCI; 3–4 October 2009	W: Bridget Becker; M: Sean Becker	W: Brydie Donald; M: Dan Mustapic	W: Wendy Becker; M: Scott Becker
2010	Naseby, MCI; 17–19 September 2010	W: Bridget Becker; M: Sean Becker	W: Brydie Donald; M: Dan Mustapic	W: Natalie Campbell; M: John Campbell
2011	St Kilda, Dunedin Ice Stadium; 29–31 July 2011	W: Bridget Becker; M: Sean Becker	W: Natalie Campbell; M: John Campbell	W: Marisa Jones; M: Nelson Ede
2012	Naseby, MCI; 31 August – 2 September 2012	W: Natalie Thurlow; M: Hans Frauenlob	W: Bridget Becker; M: Sean Becker	W: Kelsi Heath; M: Kieran Ford
2013	Naseby, MCI; 2–4 August 2013	W: Natalie Thurlow; M: Hans Frauenlob	W: Waverley Taylor; M: Kenny Thomson	W: Brydie Donald; M: Warren Dobson
2014	Naseby, MCI; 31 July – 3 August 2014	W: Marisa Jones; M: Dan Mustapic	W: Bridget Becker; M: Scott Becker	W: Waverley Taylor; M: Kenny Thomson
2015	Dunedin Ice Stadium; 30 July – 2 August 2015	W: Bridget Becker; M: Scott Becker	W: Marisa Jones; M: Warren Kearney	W: Eleanor Adviento; M: Brett Sargon
2016	Naseby, MCI; 12–14 August 2016	W: Bridget Becker; M: Scott Becker	W: Jessica Smith; M: Ben Smith	W: Eleanor Adviento; M: Brett Sargon
2017	Naseby, MCI; 10–13 August 2017	W: Bridget Becker; M: Sean Becker	W: Courtney Smith; M: Anton Hood	W: Eleanor Adviento; M: Brett Sargon
2018	Naseby, MCI; 9–12 August 2018	W: Jessica Smith; M: Ben Smith	W: Bridget Becker; M: Sean Becker	W: Courtney Smith; M: Hamish Walker
2019	Naseby, MCI; 13–16 June 2019	W: Jessica Smith; M: Ben Smith	W: Holly Thompson; M: Anton Hood	W: Courtney Smith; M: Hamish Walker
2020	Naseby, MCI; 17–20 September 2020	W: Bridget Becker; M: Sean Becker	W: Mhairi-Bronté Duncan; M: Brett Sargon	W: Courtney Smith; M: Dave Watt
2021	not held because of COVID-19 pandemic			
2022	Naseby, MCI; 22–25 September 2022	W: Courtney Smith; M: Anton Hood	W: Jessica Smith; M: Ben Smith	W: Bridget Becker; M: Sean Becker
2023	Naseby, MCI; 10–13 Augustr 2023	W: Courtney Smith; M: Anton Hood	W: Jessica Smith; M: Ben Smith	W: Mhairi-Bronté Duncan; M: Brett Sargon
2024	Naseby, MCI; 15–18 August 2024	W: Jessica Smith; M: Ben Smith	W: Courtney Smith; M: Anton Hood	W: Bridget Becker; M: Sean Becker
2025	Naseby, MCI; 14–17 August 2025	W: Courtney Smith; M: Anton Hood	W: Jessica Smith; M: Ben Smith	W: Ruby Kinney; M: Hunter Walker
2026	Naseby, MCI; 18–21 June 2026	W: Jessica Michels; M: Ben Smith	W: Ruby Kinney; M: Hunter Walker	W: Tylah James; M: Anton Hood

== Medal record for curlers ==
(as of after 2026 championship)

Curler	Gold	Silver	Bronze
Bridget Becker	8	4	2
Sean Becker	6	3	2
Ben Smith	4	4	0
Jessica Michels	4	4	0
Anton Hood	3	3	1
Courtney Smith	3	2	3
Scott Becker	3	2	1
Hans Frauenlob	2	0	0
Natalie Thurlow (Natalie Campbell)	2	1	1
Brydie Donald	1	3	1
Dan Mustapic	1	2	0
Marisa Jones	1	1	1
Brett Sargon	0	1	4
John Campbell	0	1	1
Mhairi-Bronté Duncan	0	1	1
Waverley Taylor	0	1	1
Kenny Thomson	0	1	1
Ruby Kinney	0	1	1
Hunter Walker	0	1	1
Warren Kearney	0	1	0
Holly Thompson	0	1	0
Eleanor Adviento	0	0	3
Warren Dobson	0	0	2
Hamish Walker	0	0	2
Cass Becker	0	0	1
Wendy Becker	0	0	1
Nelson Ede	0	0	1
Kieran Ford	0	0	1
Kelsi Heath	0	0	1
Kylie Petherick	0	0	1
Murray Petherick	0	0	1
Dave Watt	0	0	1
Tylah James	0	0	1

== See also ==
- New Zealand Men's Curling Championship
- New Zealand Women's Curling Championship
- New Zealand Mixed Curling Championship
- New Zealand Junior Mixed Doubles Championship
