= Ben Smith (curler) =

New Zealand curler (born 1999)

- Curler
- Born: 1 October 1999 (age 27); Ranfurly, New Zealand

Team
- Skip: Anton Hood
- Third: Ben Smith
- Second: Brett Sargon
- Lead: Hunter Walker
- Alternate: Jared Palanuik
- Mixed doubles partner: Jessica Smith

Curling career
- Member Association: New Zealand
- World Championship: 2 (2023, 2024)
- World Mixed Doubles Championship: 3 (2025, 2026, 2027)
- Pan Continental Championship: 3 (2022, 2023, 2024)

Ben Smith (born 1 October 1999) is a New Zealand curler from Ranfurly. He currently plays third on the New Zealand men's national team.

== Career ==
=== Juniors ===
Smith was a member of the New Zealand junior men's team from 2016 to 2020, playing second on the team until 2018, and then playing third thereafter. Smith's first international competition was at the 2016 World Junior B Curling Championships. The New Zealand team, skipped by Simon Neilson, finished with a 2–5 record in 16th place. The following year, the team played at the 2017 World Junior B Curling Championships. The team, now skipped by Matthew Neilson finished 16th overall again, with an improved 3–4 record. At the 2018 World Junior B Curling Championships, with Simon Neilson skipping again, the team finished fifth overall, with a 4–3 record, and losing in the quarterfinals. With Matthew Neilson skipping again, the team played at the 2019 World Junior-B Curling Championships. There, the team finished pool play with a 5–2 record, and went on to win all three of their playoff games to claim the gold medal. This promoted New Zealand to the 2019 World Junior Curling Championships. There, the team finished the round robin with a 4–5 record, finishing sixth overall, and avoiding relegation to the B tournament for the following season. At the 2020 World Junior Curling Championships, the team finished with a 3–6 record, in 8th place, relegating their country to the B event, which was cancelled due to the COVID-19 pandemic.

As a junior, Smith also competed at the 2016 Winter Youth Olympics. In the team event, he played second on a rink skipped by Matthew Neilson. They finished the event with a 1–6 record, in 13th place. In the mixed doubles event, Smith was teamed up with American Cora Farrell. The pair only played in one game, losing to Lee Ji-young of South Korea and Johan Nygren of Sweden.

=== Men's ===
Smith joined the New Zealand men's team for the 2022–23 curling season. The team represented New Zealand at the inaugural Pan Continental Curling Championships in 2022. There, the team finished with a 3–4 record, finishing in fifth place, but good enough to qualify for the 2023 World Men's Curling Championship, Smith's first men's world championship appearance. It was New Zealand's first trip to the Worlds since 2012.

In September 2023, to be able to train and attend tournaments in Canada for the 2023–24 curling season, the New Zealand team made news by moving into a retirement residence in Calgary, Alberta for training and lived there until March 2024. During the season, the team represented New Zealand at the 2023 Pan Continental Curling Championships, where they finished with a 4–3 record, missing the playoffs but qualifying New Zealand for their second consecutive world championship appearance in the 2024 World Men's Curling Championship. At the Worlds, the team would struggle, finishing with an 0–12 record. The team would represent New Zealand again at the 2025 Pan Continental Curling Championships, finishing with a 2–5 record, failing to go to their third consecutive world championship. However, their appearance at the 2024 Worlds qualified the team to represent New Zealand at the 2025 Pre-Olympic Qualification Event, in an attempt to qualify for the 2026 Winter Olympics.

=== National championships ===
Playing third on the Anton Hood rink, Smith won the New Zealand Men's Curling Championship in 2020. He was also runners-up in 2016 playing second for Matthew Neilson, in 2019 playing third for Neilson and in 2021 playing third for Brett Sargon. In mixed doubles curling Smith and sister Jessica won the New Zealand Mixed Doubles Curling Championship in 2018 and 2019.

== Personal life ==
Smith works as a plumber.
