= 2019 World Junior-B Curling Championships =

2019 World Junior-B Curling Championships may refer to:

- 2019 World Junior-B Curling Championships (January), championship held to qualify teams for the 2019 World Junior Curling Championship
- 2019 World Junior-B Curling Championships (December), championship held to qualify teams for the 2020 World Junior Curling Championship
