= 1995 Pacific Curling Championships =

- Host city: Tokoro, Hokkaido, Japan
- Arena: Tokoro Curling Club
- Dates: December 7–10
- Men's winner: Australia
- Curling club: Sydney Harbour CC, Sydney
- Skip: Hugh Millikin
- Third: Stephen Johns
- Second: Gerald Chick
- Lead: Andy Campbell
- Finalist: Japan
- Women's winner: Japan
- Skip: Ayako Ishigaki
- Third: Emi Arai
- Second: Yukari Kondo
- Lead: Yoko Mimura
- Alternate: Mayumi Ohkutsu
- Finalist: Australia (Lynn Hewitt)

The 1995 Pacific Curling Championships were held from December 7 to 10 at the Tokoro Curling Club in Tokoro, Hokkaido, Japan.

Australia won the men's event over Japan (it was the fifth Pacific title for the Australian men). On the women's side, Japan defeated Australia in the final (it was the fourth Pacific title for the Japanese women).

By virtue of winning, the Australian men's team and the Japanese women's team qualified for the 1996 World Men's and Women's Curling Championships in Hamilton, Ontario, Canada.

== Men ==
=== Teams ===
Country	Skip	Third	Second	Lead	Alternate	Coach	Curling club
Australia	Hugh Millikin	Stephen Johns	Gerald Chick	Andy Campbell			Sydney Harbour CC, Sydney
Japan				Yoshiyuki Ohmiya			
New Zealand	Peter Becker	Sean Becker	Allan McLean	Lorne De Pape	Darren Carson	Edwin Harley	

=== Round robin ===
Place	Country	Skip	(Australia)	(Japan)	(New Zealand)	Wins	Losses
1	Australia	Hugh Millikin	*	4:3; 4:2	9:2; 10:2	4	0
2	Japan		3:4; 2:4	*	15:3; 6:1	2	2
3	New Zealand	Peter Becker	2:9; 2:10	3:15; 1:6	*	0	4

Teams to final

=== Final ===
Team	1	2	3	4	5	6	7	8	9	10	Final
Australia (Hugh Millikin)	0	1	0	1	1	1	2	1	0	X	7
Japan	1	0	0	0	0	0	1	0	0	X	2

=== Final standings ===
Place	Country	Skip	GP	W	L
1st place, gold medalist(s)	Australia	Hugh Millikin	5	5	0
2nd place, silver medalist(s)	Japan		5	2	3
3rd place, bronze medalist(s)	New Zealand	Peter Becker	4	0	4

== Women ==
=== Teams ===
Country	Skip	Third	Second	Lead	Alternate	Curling club
Australia	Lynn Hewitt	Linda Carter-Watts	Ellen Weir	Lyn Greenwood		Victoria Curling Association
Japan	Ayako Ishigaki	Emi Arai	Yukari Kondo	Yoko Mimura	Mayumi Ohkutsu	
New Zealand	Helen Greer	Carroll Depape	Helen Rutherford	Patsy Inder		

=== Round robin ===
Place	Country	Skip	(Japan)	(Australia)	(New Zealand)	Wins	Losses
1	Japan	Ayako Ishigaki	*	14:1; 9:6	17:1; 15:3	4	0
2	Australia	Lynn Hewitt	1:14; 6:9	*	14:6; 9:8	2	2
3	New Zealand	Helen Greer	1:17; 3:15	6:14; 8:9	*	0	4

Teams to final

=== Final ===
Team	1	2	3	4	5	6	7	8	9	10	Final
Japan (Ayako Ishigaki)											10
Australia (Lynn Hewitt)											2

=== Final standings ===
Place	Country	Skip	GP	W	L
1st place, gold medalist(s)	Japan	Ayako Ishigaki	5	5	0
2nd place, silver medalist(s)	Australia	Lynn Hewitt	5	2	3
3rd place, bronze medalist(s)	New Zealand	Helen Greer	4	0	4
