= 1999 Pacific Curling Championships =

- Host city: Tokoro, Hokkaido, Japan
- Dates: December 9–12
- Men's winner: Japan
- Skip
- Finalist: Australia (Hugh Millikin)
- Women's winner: Japan
- Skip
- Finalist: South Korea

The 1999 Pacific Curling Championships were held from December 9 to 12 in Tokoro, Hokkaido, Japan.

Japan won the men's event over Australia (it was the first Pacific title for the Japanese men). On the women's side, Japan defeated South Korea in the final (it was the eighth Pacific title for the Japanese women).

The Japanese men's team and the Japanese women's team qualified for the 2000 World Men's and Women's Curling Championships in Glasgow, Scotland.

== Men ==
=== Teams ===
Country	Skip	Third	Second	Lead	Alternate	Coach	Curling club
Australia	Hugh Millikin	Gerald Chick	John Theriault	Stephen Johns			Sydney Harbour CC, Sydney
Japan							
South Korea							
New Zealand	Sean Becker	Hans Frauenlob	Jim Allan	Lorne De Pape	Darren Carson	Edwin Harley	

=== Round robin ===
Place	Country	Skip	(Australia)	(Japan)	(New Zealand)	(South Korea)	Wins	Losses
1	Australia	Hugh Millikin	*	6:10; 5:4	6:2; 4:3	8:3; 7:3	5	1
2	Japan		10:6; 4:5	*	4:8; 5:3	13:3; 6:3	4	2
3	New Zealand	Sean Becker	2:6; 3:4	8:4; 3:5	*	13:1; 10:2	3	3
4	South Korea		3:8; 3:7	3:13; 3:6	1:13; 2:10	*	0	6

Teams to playoffs

=== Playoffs ===
Semifinal		Final
		Australia	2
Japan	7	Japan	6
New Zealand	5

Semifinal

Team	1	2	3	4	5	6	7	8	9	10	11	Final
Japan	1	2	0	1	0	0	0	0	1	0	2	7
New Zealand (Sean Becker)	0	0	2	0	1	0	1	0	0	1	0	5

Final

Team	1	2	3	4	5	6	7	8	9	10	Final
Japan	0	0	0	3	0	1	0	0	2	X	6
Australia (Hugh Millikin)	1	0	0	0	0	0	1	0	0	X	2

=== Final standings ===
Place	Country	Skip	GP	W	L
1st place, gold medalist(s)	Japan		8	6	2
2nd place, silver medalist(s)	Australia	Hugh Millikin	7	5	2
3rd place, bronze medalist(s)	New Zealand	Sean Becker	7	3	4
4	South Korea		6	0	6

== Women ==
=== Teams ===
Country	Skip	Third	Second	Lead	Alternate	Coach
Japan						
South Korea						
New Zealand	Lisa Anderson	Kylie Petherick	Karen Rawcliffe	Bridget Becker	Natalie Campbell	Peter Becker

=== Round robin ===
Place	Country	Skip	(Japan)	(South Korea)	(New Zealand)	Wins	Losses
1	Japan		*	7:6; 9:3	9:0; 10:2	4	0
2	South Korea		6:7; 3:9	*	10:11; 7:6	1	3
3	New Zealand	Lisa Anderson	0:9; 2:10	11:10; 6:7	*	1	3

Teams to playoffs

=== Playoffs ===
Semifinals		Final
		Japan	7
South Korea	8	South Korea	3
New Zealand	4

=== Final standings ===
Place	Country	Skip	GP	W	L
1st place, gold medalist(s)	Japan		5	5	0
2nd place, silver medalist(s)	South Korea		6	2	4
3rd place, bronze medalist(s)	New Zealand	Lisa Anderson	5	1	4
