= John Campbell (curler) =

New Zealand curler and coach

- Curler

Team
- Curling club: Alexandra CC, Alexandra, New Zealand
- Mixed doubles partner: Liz Matthews

Curling career
- Member Association: New Zealand
- World Mixed Doubles Championship: 1 (2012)
- Pacific-Asia Championship: 2 (1993, 1994)
Medal record
Curling
Pacific Championships
Bronze medal – third place	1993 Adelaida
Bronze medal – third place	1994 Christchurch
New Zealand Men's Championship
Bronze medal – third place	2010 Naseby
Bronze medal – third place	2012 Naseby
New Zealand Mixed Doubles Championship
Bronze medal – third place	2010 Naseby
Silver medal – second place	2011 Dunedin

John Campbell is a New Zealand curler and curling coach.

On international level he is a two-time bronze medallist (1993, 1994) of Pacific Curling Championships.

== Teams and events ==
=== Men's ===
Season	Skip	Third	Second	Lead	Alternate	Coach	Events
1993–94	Peter Becker	Barry Brown	John Campbell	Ross A. Stevens	Edwin Harley		PCC 1993 (bronze)
1994–95	Peter Becker	Barry Brown	Ross A. Stevens	Richard Morgan	John Campbell	Edwin Harley	PCC 1994 (bronze)
2004–05	Peter Becker	Barry Brown	John Campbell	Ross A. Stevens	Edwin Harley		WSCC 2005 (15th)
2008–09	John Campbell	?	?	?			NZMCC 2008 (6th)
2009–10	John Campbell	Murray Petherick	Michael Smith	Pat Cooney			NZMCC 2009 (5th)
2010–11	John Campbell	Murray Petherick	Michael Smith	James Hazlett			NZMCC 2010 (bronze)
2011–12	John Campbell	Murray Petherick	John Sanders	Pat Cooney			NZMCC 2011 (7th)
2012–13	John Campbell	Murray Petherick	Martin Olund	Luke Steele			NZMCC 2012 (bronze)

=== Mixed doubles ===
Season	Female	Male	Coach	Events
2009–10	Natalie Campbell	John Campbell		NZMDCC 2009 (5th)
2010–11	Natalie Campbell	John Campbell		NZMDCC 2010 (bronze)
2011–12	Natalie Campbell	John Campbell	Dan Thurlow (WMDCC)	NZMDCC 2011 (silver); WMDCC 2012 (10th)
2012–13	Liz Matthews	John Campbell		NZMDCC 2012 (13th)

== Record as a coach of national teams ==
Year	Tournament, event	National team	Place
2003	2003 Pacific Curling Championships	Australia (women)	3rd place, bronze medalist(s)
2011	2011 Pacific Curling Championships	Australia (women)	3rd place, bronze medalist(s)

== Personal life ==
His daughter Natalie Thurlow (née Campbell) is also a curler, they played together many times as mixed doubles team at national championships and World Championship 2012.
