= 2017 Pacific-Asia Curling Championships =

- Host city: Erina, Australia
- Arena: Erina Ice Arena
- Dates: 2–8 November
- Men's winner: South Korea
- Skip: Kim Chang-min
- Third: Seong Se-hyeon
- Second: Oh Eun-Su
- Lead: Lee Ki-bok
- Alternate: Kim Min-chan
- Finalist: China (Zou Dejia)
- Women's winner: South Korea
- Skip: Kim Eun-jung
- Third: Kim Kyeong-ae
- Second: Kim Seon-yeong
- Lead: Kim Yeong-mi
- Alternate: Kim Min-jung
- Finalist: Japan (Satsuki Fujisawa)

The 2017 Pacific-Asia Curling Championships was held 2–8 November in Erina, New South Wales, Australia. The top three teams from the men's and women's tournaments qualified for the 2018 World Men's Curling Championship and 2018 Ford World Women's Curling Championship respectively. This was the first Pacific-Asia Championship where the top three teams qualified for the World Championships. Previously, only the top two teams qualified.

== Men ==
=== Teams ===
Australia	China	Chinese Taipei
Fourth: Dean Hewitt; Third: Ian Palangio; Second: Christopher Ordog; Skip: Hugh Millikin; Alternate: Jay Merchant	Skip: Zou Dejia; Third: Zou Qiang; Second: Xu Jingtao; Lead: Shao Zhilin; Alternate: Ma Yanlong	Skip: Randolph Shen; Third: Nicolas Hsu; Second: Brendon Liu; Lead: Ting-Li Lin; Alternate:
Hong Kong	Japan	Kazakhstan
Skip: Jason Chang; Third: Derek Leung; Second: Teddie Leung; Lead: Martin Yan; Alternate: John Li	Skip: Yusuke Morozumi; Third: Tetsuro Shimizu; Second: Tsuyoshi Yamaguchi; Lead: Kosuke Morozumi; Alternate: Kohsuke Hirata	Skip: Viktor Kim; Third: Abylaikhan Zhuzbay; Second: Joan Akhmad; Lead: Dinislam Aimishev; Alternate:
South Korea	New Zealand	Qatar
Skip: Kim Chang-min; Third: Seong Se-hyeon; Second: Oh Eun-Su; Lead: Lee Ki-bok; Alternate: Kim Min-chan	Skip: Sean Becker; Third: Warren Dobson; Second: Brett Sargon; Lead: Anton Hood; Alternate: Hamish Walker	Skip: Nabeel Alyafei; Third: Ahmed Al-Fahad; Second: Abdulrahman Alyafei; Lead: Ali Salem; Alternate:

=== Round robin standings ===
Key
Teams advanced to playoffs

Country	Skip	W	L
Japan	Yusuke Morozumi	8	0
Australia	Hugh Millikin	7	1
China	Zou Dejia	6	2
South Korea	Kim Chang-min	5	3
New Zealand	Sean Becker	4	4
Chinese Taipei	Randie Shen	3	5
Hong Kong	Jason Chang	1	7
Kazakhstan	Viktor Kim	1	7
Qatar	Nabeel Alyafei	1	7

=== Playoffs ===
Semi-finals
1	Japan	7
4	South Korea	8
2	Australia	6
3	China	7

Final
4	South Korea	9
3	China	8

Bronze Medal Game
1	Japan	11
2	Australia	4

== Women ==
=== Teams ===
Australia	China	Hong Kong
Skip: Helen Williams; Third: Kim Forge; Second: Ashleigh Street; Lead: Michelle Fredericks Armstrong; Alternate: Anne Powell	Skip: Jiang Yilun; Third: Jiang Xindi; Second: Yao Mingyue; Lead: Yan Hui; Alternate: Xu Meng	Skip: Ling-Yue Hung; Third: Julie Morrison; Second: Ada Shang; Lead: Ashura Wong; Alternate: Grace Bugg
Japan	South Korea	New Zealand
Skip: Satsuki Fujisawa; Third: Chinami Yoshida; Second: Mari Motohashi; Lead: Yurika Yoshida; Alternate: Yumi Suzuki	Skip: Kim Eun-jung; Third: Kim Kyeong-ae; Second: Kim Seon-yeong; Lead: Kim Yeong-mi; Alternate: Kim Min-jung	Skip: Bridget Becker; Third: Jessica Smith; Second: Thivya Jeyaranjan; Lead: Holly Thompson; Alternate: Emma Sutherland

=== Round robin standings ===
Key
Teams advanced to playoffs

Country	Skip	W	L
South Korea	Kim Eun-jung	10	0
China	Jiang Yilun	8	2
Japan	Satsuki Fujisawa	6	4
Hong Kong*	Ling-Yue Hung	3	7
New Zealand*	Bridget Becker	3	7
Australia	Helen Williams	0	10

* Both teams had beaten each other in the round robin, so Hong Kong advanced to the playoffs after a draw shot challenge.

=== Playoffs ===
Semi-finals
1	South Korea	14
4	Hong Kong	2
2	China	5
3	Japan	6

Final
1	South Korea	11
3	Japan	6

Bronze Medal Game
2	China	8
4	Hong Kong	3
