= Eleanor Adviento =

New Zealand curler (born 1995)

- Curler
- Born: 18 April 1995 (age 31); Manila, Philippines

Team
- Curling club: Auckland CC, Auckland
- Mixed doubles partner: Brett Sargon

Curling career
- Member Association: New Zealand
- World Mixed Doubles Championship: 1 (2018)
- Pacific-Asia Championship: 2 (2014, 2015)
- Olympic: Youth Olympics: 1 (2012)
- Other appearances: World Junior-B Championships: 1 (2016), Pacific-Asia Junior Championships: 4 (2012, 2013, 2014, 2015)
Medal record
Curling
New Zealand Women's Championship
Gold medal – first place	2015 Naseby
Gold medal – first place	2016 Naseby
Silver medal – second place	2013 Dunedin
Silver medal – second place	2014 Naseby
Silver medal – second place	2017 Dunedin
Silver medal – second place	2022 Naseby
Bronze medal – third place	2012 Naseby
New Zealand Mixed Doubles Championship
Bronze medal – third place	2015 Dunedin
Bronze medal – third place	2016 Naseby
Bronze medal – third place	2017 Naseby
Pacific-Asia Junior Championships
Bronze medal – third place	2015 Naseby

Eleanor Adviento (born 18 April 1995 in Manila, Philippines; also known as Eleanor D Reyes) is a New Zealand female curler.

At the national level, she is a two-time New Zealand women's champion curler (2015, 2016) and two-time New Zealand mixed champion curler (2016, 2017).

Adviento has a master's degree from the University of Auckland, completed in 2018, on the use of mitochondrial DNA to predict embryo quality.

== Teams and events ==
=== Women's ===
Season	Skip	Third	Second	Lead	Alternate	Coach	Events
2009–10	Brittany Taylor	Katie Bauer	Lana Williams	Eleanor Adviento			NZWCC 2010 (5th)
2010–11	Luke Steele	Eleanor Adviento	David Weyer	Kelsi Heath			NZWCC 2011 (...th)
2011–12	Chelsea Farley	Thivya Jeyaranjan	Tessa Farley	Kelsi Heath	Eleanor Adviento	Nelson Ede	PAJCC 2012 (4th)
2011–12	Wendy Becker	Liz Matthews	Eleanor Adviento	Helen Greer			NZWCC 2012 (bronze)
2012–13	Thivya Jeyaranjan	Chelsea Farley	Tessa Farley	Kelsi Heath	Eleanor Adviento		PAJCC 2013 (4th)
2012–13	Thivya Jeyaranjan (fourth)	Chelsea Farley (skip)	Tessa Farley	Eleanor Adviento			NZWCC 2013 (silver)
2013–14	Eleanor Adviento	Tessa Farley	Holly Thompson	Jessica Smith	Waverley Taylor	Liz Matthews	PAJCC 2014 (4th)
2013–14	Chelsea Farley	Thivya Jeyaranjan	Tessa Farley	Eleanor Adviento			NZWCC 2014 (silver)
2014—15	Thivya Jeyaranjan (fourth)	Chelsea Farley (skip)	Tessa Farley	Eleanor Adviento	Waverley Taylor	Liz Matthews	PACC 2014 (4th)
2014—15	Eleanor Adviento	Waverley Taylor	Jessica Smith	Holly Thompson	Eloise Pointon	Nelson Ede	PAJCC 2015 (bronze)
2014—15	Chelsea Farley	Thivya Jeyaranjan	Tessa Farley	Eleanor Adviento			NZWCC 2015 (gold)
2015—16	Thivya Jeyaranjan (fourth)	Chelsea Farley (skip)	Tessa Farley	Eleanor Adviento	Emily Whelan	Liz Matthews	PACC 2015 (5th)
2015—16	Eleanor Adviento	Jessica Smith	Waverley Taylor	Holly Thompson	Emma Sutherland	Nelson Ede	WJBCC 2016 (5th)
2015—16	Thivya Jeyaranjan (fourth)	Chelsea Farley (skip)	Tessa Farley	Eleanor Adviento			NZWCC 2016 (gold)
2016—17	Chelsea Farley	Thivya Jeyaranjan	Tessa Farley	Eleanor Adviento			NZWCC 2017 (silver)

=== Mixed ===
Season	Skip	Third	Second	Lead	Alternate	Coach	Events
2009–10	Brett Sargon (fourth)	Brittany Taylor	Kieran Ford (skip)	Eleanor Adviento			NZMxCC 2010 (bronze)
2010–11	Luke Steele	Eleanor Adviento	David Weyer	Kelsi Heath			NZMxCC 2011 (7th)
2011–12	Luke Steele	Eleanor Adviento	David Weyer	Kelsi Heath		Peter Becker	WYOG 2012 (13th)
2011–12	Kieran Ford	Eleanor Adviento	Brett Sargon	Kelsi Heath			NZMxCC 2012 (silver)
2012–13	Brett Sargon (fourth)	Kenny Thomson	Eleanor Adviento (skip)	Robert Giles	Beth Gibbs		NZMxCC 2013 (4th)
2013–14	Thivya Jeyaranjan	Ben Frew	Eleanor Adviento	Kieran Grieve			NZMxCC 2014 (bronze)
2014–15	Brett Sargon (fourth)	Eleanor Adviento	Kieran Ford (skip)	Emily Whelan			NZMxCC 2015 (bronze)
2015–16	Brett Sargon	Eleanor Adviento	Kieran Ford	Thivya Jeyaranjan			NZMxCC 2016 (gold)
2016–17	Brett Sargon	Eleanor Adviento	Kieran Ford	Thivya Jeyaranjan			NZMxCC 2017 (gold)

=== Mixed doubles ===
Season	Female	Male	Coach	Events
2011–12	Romano Meier	Eleanor Adviento	Peter Becker	WYOG 2012 (17th)
2012–13	Brett Sargon	Eleanor Adviento		NZMDCC 2012 (5th)
2013–14	Brett Sargon	Eleanor Adviento		NZMDCC 2013 (4th)
2015–16	Brett Sargon	Eleanor Adviento		NZMDCC 2015 (bronze)
2016–17	Brett Sargon	Eleanor Adviento		NZMDCC 2016 (bronze)
2017–18	Brett Sargon	Eleanor Adviento	Michael Moss	NZMDCC 2017 (bronze); WMDCC 2018 (39th)
