= Anton Hood =

New Zealand curler (born 2000)

- Curler
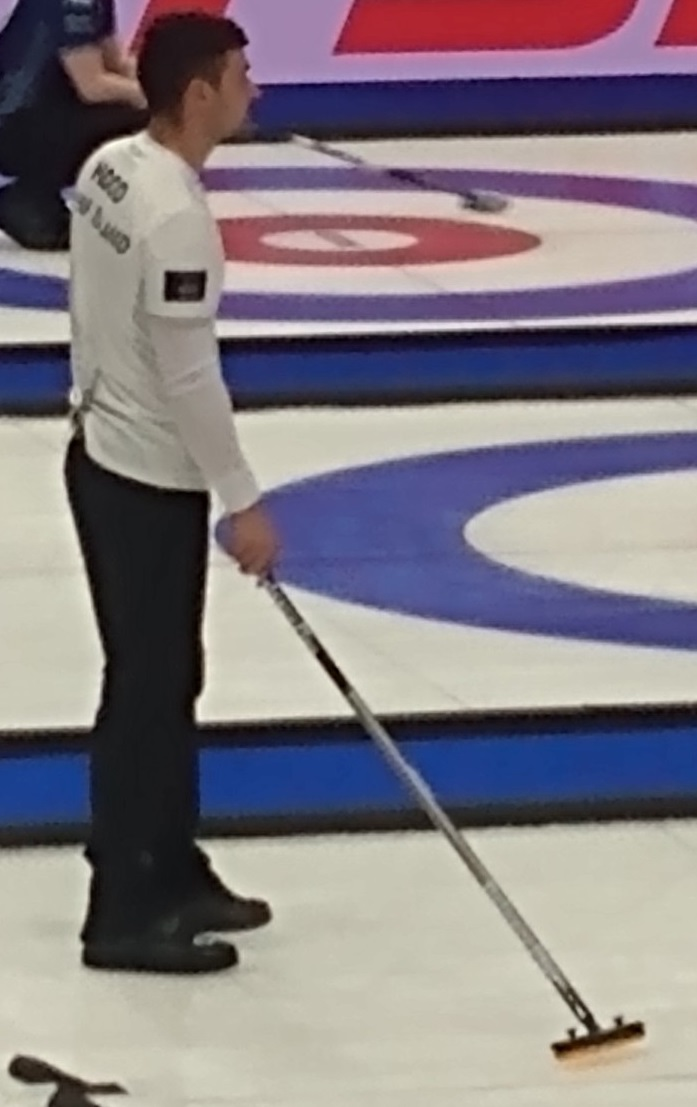
- Born: 13 January 2000 (age 26); Auckland

Team
- Skip: Anton Hood
- Third: Ben Smith
- Second: Brett Sargon
- Lead: Hunter Walker
- Alternate: Jared Palanuik
- Mixed doubles partner: Courtney Smith

Curling career
- Member Association: New Zealand
- World Championship: 2 (2023, 2024)
- World Mixed Doubles Championship: 1 (2024)
- Pacific-Asia Championship: 4 (2016, 2017, 2018, 2019)
- Pan Continental Championship: 3 (2022, 2023, 2024)

Anton Hood (born 13 January 2000) is a New Zealand curler from Naseby. He currently skips the New Zealand men's national team.

== Career ==
Hood began curling around 2013.

Hood first represented New Zealand internationally at the 2016 Pacific-Asia Curling Championships, where he was the alternate on the team, which was skipped by Peter de Boer. The team finished fifth, and Hood did not play in any games. Later in the season, Hood was the alternate for the New Zealand junior men's team at the 2017 World Junior B Curling Championships. The team, skipped by Matthew Neilson finished 16th overall, with Hood playing in four matches.

Hood played third on the New Zealand mixed team at the 2017 World Mixed Curling Championship, on a team skipped by Thivya Jeyaranjan. The team finished with a 2–5 record, 27th overall. That season, Hood was promoted to play lead on the New Zealand men's team, skipped by Sean Becker. The team played at the 2017 Pacific-Asia Curling Championships, finishing with a 4–4 record, good enough for fifth place. Hood remained as the alternate on the New Zealand junior men's team, now skipped by Simon Neilson. The team played in the 2018 World Junior B Curling Championships, finishing fifth overall. Hood played in three games at the event.

For the 2018–19 curling season, Hood was moved to play second on the New Zealand men's team, skipped by Scott Becker. The team played in the 2018 Pacific-Asia Curling Championships, where they made the playoffs after posting a 5–3 record. In the playoffs, they lost both the semifinal against Japan and the bronze medal game against South Korea, settling for fourth. The team played in the inaugural 2019 World Qualification Event in an attempt to qualify for the 2019 World Men's Curling Championship. There, the team finished with a 5–2 record, missing the playoffs, and failing to qualify for the Worlds. That season, Hood was promoted to throwing last stones (with Matthew Neilson skipping) on the New Zealand junior men's team at the 2019 World Junior-B Curling Championships. There, the team finished pool play with a 5–2 record, and went on to win all three of their playoff games to claim the gold medal. This promoted New Zealand to the 2019 World Junior Curling Championships. There, the team finished the round robin with a 4–5 record, finishing sixth overall, and avoiding relegation to the B tournament for the following season. The team went on to be runners up at the 2019 New Zealand Men's Curling Championship.

The next season, Hood was moved to play third on the national team, still skipped by Scott Becker. The team played in the 2019 Pacific-Asia Curling Championships, again making the playoffs, this time after finishing with a 6–3 record. The team lost both of their playoff games again, losing to South Korea in the semifinal, then China in the bronze medal game, finishing fourth. In his last year of juniors, Hood played in the 2020 World Junior Curling Championships, once again throwing last rocks while Matthew Neilson skipped. The team finished with a 3–6 record, in 8th place, relegating their country to the B event, which was cancelled due to the COVID-19 pandemic.

In 2020, Hood won his first New Zealand Men's Curling Championship, throwing last rocks on a team skipped by Peter de Boer.

The pandemic cancelled many international events during the 2020–21 and 2021–22 curling seasons. One event that was not cancelled was the 2021 World Mixed Doubles Curling Championship, which was played in May 2021. After the previous national champion pair backed out, Hood teamed up with Courtney Smith, after having not curled together for four or five years, to represent New Zealand at the event. There, the pair finished with a 4–5 record in pool play, missing the playoffs, and finishing 12th overall. Their placement was not strong enough to qualify New Zealand for the 2022 Winter Olympics.

After winning the 2022 New Zealand Mixed Doubles Curling Championship, Hood and Smith attempted to qualify for the 2022 World Mixed Doubles Curling Championship as well, at the 2022 World Mixed Doubles Qualification Event. The team started out strong, finishing in first place in their pool with a 6–0 record. However, in the playoffs, they lost their first match up to Turkey, rebounded to defeat China, bust lost to the Netherlands in the third qualification game, failing to make it to the World Championship. During this time, Hood skipped his team of Ben Smith, Brett Sargon and Hunter Walker to a second-place finish at the 2021 New Zealand Men's Championship.

Hood was promoted to skip the New Zealand men's team for the 2022–23 curling season, leading his team of Ben Smith at third, Sargon at second and Walker at lead. The team represented New Zealand at the inaugural Pan Continental Curling Championships in 2022. There, Hood led the team to a 3–4 record, finishing in fifth place, but good enough to qualify for the 2023 World Men's Curling Championship, Hood's first men's world championship appearance. It was New Zealand's first trip to the Worlds since 2012. Hood won the 2023 Collie Campbell Memorial Award.

In September 2023, to be able to train and attend tournaments in Canada for the 2023–24 curling season, Hood and his teammates made news by moving into a retirement residence in Calgary, Alberta for training and lived there until March 2024. During the season, the team represented New Zealand at the 2023 Pan Continental Curling Championships, where they finished with a 4–3 record, missing the playoffs but qualifying New Zealand for their second consecutive world championship appearance in the 2024 World Men's Curling Championship. At the Worlds, the team would struggle, finishing with an 0–12 record. The team would represent New Zealand again at the 2024 Pan Continental Curling Championships, finishing with a 2–5 record, failing to go to their third consecutive world championship. However, their appearance at the 2024 Worlds qualified the team to represent New Zealand at the 2025 Pre-Olympic Qualification Event, where they would finish 3rd, and qualify for the 2025 Olympic Qualification Event.

In 2025, Hood was selected to be a competitor in the inaugural Rock League season as a member of the Typhoon Curling Club.

== Personal life ==
Hood's father is Adrian Hood. Anton Hood works as a carpenter and builder, and apprenticed with Breen Construction. He is from Kyeburn. In 2019, he was nominated for Junior Sportsman of the Year at the Central Otago Sports Awards.
