= World Junior-B Curling Championships =

Bonspiel for under-21s

- Established: 1999
- 2026 host city: Lohja, Finland
- 2026 arena: Kisakallio Sports Institute

Current champions (2025)
- Men: United States
- Women: Japan

Current edition
- 2025 World Junior-B Curling Championships

The World Junior-B Curling Championships are an annual curling bonspiel. The championships feature curlers under the age of 21 competing to qualify for three spots in the World Junior Curling Championships. Nations that participate are those which have not already qualified for the World Junior Championships. The competition originally was established in 1999, then was replaced after the 2003-04 season with the European Junior Curling Challenge and Pacific-Asia Junior Curling Championships. In 2016, the Junior-B Championships were brought back to replace the European and Pacific-Asia Junior Championships.

The 2021 World Junior-B Championships were scheduled to be held in Lohja, Finland, but in September 2020 the World Curling Federation announced they would be cancelled due to the ongoing COVID-19 pandemic.

== Summary ==
For men's team and women's team, name of skip listed below country.

For mixed doubles, name of female curler, then male curler listed below country.

=== Men ===
| Year | Location | Final | | | Third Place Match |
| Year | Location | Champion | Score | Second Place | Third Place | Score | Fourth Place |
|---|---|---|---|---|---|---|---|
| 1999 | (Germany) Hamburg | Norway; Thomas Berntsen | N/A (Note: Not played due to format of tournament.) | Czech Republic; Vit Nekovarik | France; Jérémy Frarier | N/A | Austria; Marco Reiner |
| 2001 | (Denmark) Tårnby | France; Richard Ducroz | N/A | Russia; Alexander Kirikov | Italy; Joël Retornaz | N/A | Norway; Thomas Løvold |
| 2002 | (Germany) Hügelsheim | Norway; Thomas Løvold | N/A | Russia; Alexander Kirikov | Czech Republic; Petr Sulc | 5–4 | France; Jérémy Frarier |
| 2003 | (Denmark) Tårnby | Norway; Thomas Løvold | 4–3 | Finland; Tuomas Vuori | United States; Kristopher Perkovich | 4–3 | France; Richard Ducroz |
| 2004 | (Denmark) Tårnby | South Korea; Kim Soo-hyuk | 9–5 | Italy; Joël Retornaz | Czech Republic; Milos Hoferka | N/A | Finland; Riku Harjula |
| 2016 | (Finland) Lohja | Russia; Alexander Eremin | 5–2 | Denmark; Tobias Thune | South Korea; Lee Ki-jeong | 4–2 | Germany; Marc Muskatewitz |
| 2017 | (Sweden) Östersund | China; Wang Zhiyu | 5–2 | Turkey; Uğurcan Karagöz | Italy; Marco Onnis | 5–2 | Germany; Marc Muskatewitz |
| 2018 | (Finland) Lohja | China; Wang Zhiyu | 5–4 | Russia; Aleksandr Bystrov | Germany; Sixten Totzek | 6–4 | Spain; Gontzal Garcia |
| 2019 (January) | (Finland) Lohja | New Zealand; Matthew Neilson | 8–4 | Italy; Luca Rizzolli | China; Wang Weihaoping | 6–4 | South Korea; Lee Jae-beom |
| 2019 (December) | (Finland) Lohja | Sweden; Daniel Magnusson | 6–5 | Italy; Giacomo Colli | Germany; Sixten Totzek | 5–4 | France; Eddy Mercier |
| 2021 | (Finland) Lohja | Cancelled | | | Cancelled |
| 2022 (January) | (Finland) Lohja | Suspended | | | Suspended |
| 2022 (December) | (Finland) Lohja | China; Fei Xueqing | 7–2 | Italy; Giacomo Colli | Turkey; Serkan Karagöz | 6–5 | Sweden; Axel Landelius |
| 2023 | (Finland) Lohja | Canada; Johnson Tao | 7–4 | United States; Wesley Wendling | Denmark; Jacob Schmidt | 7–5 | New Zealand; Sam Flanagan |
| 2024 | (Finland) Lohja | South Korea; Kim Dae-hyun | 4–3 | Switzerland; Felix Lüthold | Japan; Toa Nakahara | 7–2 | China; Liu Guangshen |
| 2025 | (Finland) Lohja | United States; Caden Hebert | 5–2 | Switzerland; Felix Lüthold | Poland; Szymon Rokita | 11–4 | Latvia; Kristaps Zass |
| 2026 | (Finland) Lohja |

=== Women ===
| Year | Location | Final | | | Third Place Match |
| Year | Location | Champion | Score | Second Place | Third Place | Score | Fourth Place |
|---|---|---|---|---|---|---|---|
| 1999 | (Germany) Hamburg | Germany; Cornelia Stock | N/A | Russia; Nina Golovtchenko | Denmark; Louise Jensen | N/A | Italy; Erica de Salvador |
| 2001 | (Denmark) Tårnby | Germany; Daniela Jentsch | N/A | Denmark; Madeleine Dupont | Italy; Diana Gaspari | N/A | Czech Republic; Lenka Danielisova |
| 2002 | (Germany) Hügelsheim | Germany; Daniela Jentsch | N/A | Italy; Diana Gaspari | Denmark; Denise Dupont | N/A | Czech Republic; Hana Synácková |
| 2003 | (Denmark) Tårnby | Russia; Nkeirouka Ezekh | N/A | Norway; Linn Githmark | Denmark; Nete Larsen | N/A | Czech Republic; Sárka Doudová |
| 2004 | (Denmark) Tårnby | Denmark; Madeleine Dupont | N/A | Russia; Liudmila Privivkova | Czech Republic; Sárka Doudová | N/A | South Korea; Kim Ji-Suk |
| 2016 | (Finland) Lohja | Russia; Evgeniya Demkina | 6–3 | Japan; Ayano Tsuchiya | Hungary; Dorottya Palancsa | 9–2 | Estonia; Marie Turmann |
| 2017 | (Sweden) Östersund | Scotland; Sophie Jackson | 7–4 | Turkey; Dilşat Yıldız | Japan; Misaki Tanaka | 6–3 | China; Zhang Lijun |
| 2018 | (Finland) Lohja | China; Wang Zixin | 4–2 | Turkey; Dilşat Yıldız | Norway; Maia Ramsfjell | 5–4 | New Zealand; Jessica Smith |
| 2019 (January) | (Finland) Lohja | Scotland; Beth Farmer | 5–3 | Russia; Vlada Rumiantseva | Japan; Ami Enami | 6–5 | Hungary; Linda Joó |
| 2019 (December) | (Finland) Lohja | Japan; Sae Yamamoto | 7–1 | Latvia; Evelīna Barone | Denmark; Mathilde Halse | 8–2 | Hungary; Linda Joó |
| 2021 | (Finland) Lohja | Cancelled | | | Cancelled |
| 2022 (January) | (Finland) Lohja | Cancelled | | | Cancelled |
| 2022 (December) | (Finland) Lohja | Canada; Emily Deschenes | 5–4 | Scotland; Fay Henderson | South Korea; Kang Bo-bae | 11–10 | Turkey; İlknur Ürüşan |
| 2023 | (Finland) Lohja | China; Li Ziru | 6–3 | Canada; Myla Plett | Germany; Sara Messenzehl | 7–5 | Turkey; İlknur Ürüşan |
| 2024 | (Finland) Lohja | South Korea; Kang Bo-bae | 7–3 | Latvia; Evelīna Barone | China; Li Ziru | 8–4 | Scotland; Callie Soutar |
| 2025 | (Finland) Lohja | Japan; Yuina Miura | 8–1 | United States; Allory Johnson | Turkey; Melisa Cömert | 6–4 | Scotland; Katie Archibald |
| 2026 | (Finland) Lohja |
