= Bridget Becker =

New Zealand curler (born 1980)

- Curler
- Born: 23 April 1980 (age 46); Ranfurly, Otago, New Zealand

Team
- Curling club: Ranfurly CC, Ranfurly
- Skip: Bridget Becker
- Third: Holly Thompson
- Second: Rachael Pitts
- Lead: Ruby Kinney
- Alternate: Natalie Thurlow
- Mixed doubles partner: Sean Becker

Curling career
- Member Association: New Zealand
- World Championship: 2 (2023, 2024)
- World Mixed Doubles Championship: 6 (2008, 2010, 2011, 2016, 2017, 2019)
- Pacific-Asia Championship: 15 (1998, 1999, 2000, 2001, 2002, 2003, 2004, 2005, 2006, 2007, 2008, 2009, 2010, 2012, 2017)
- Pan Continental Championship: 3 (2022, 2023, 2025)
Medal record
Curling
Representing New Zealand
World Mixed Doubles Curling Championship
Silver medal – second place	2010 Chelyabinsk
Pacific Curling Championships
Silver medal – second place	1998 Qualicum Beach
Bronze medal – third place	1999 Tokoro
Bronze medal – third place	2000 Esquimalt
Bronze medal – third place	2002 Queenstown
Bronze medal – third place	2003 Aomori

Bridget Becker (born April 23, 1980 in Ranfurly, Otago, New Zealand) is a New Zealand female curler from Patearoa.

At the international level, she is runner-up of 2010 World Mixed Doubles Curling Championship, runner-up (1998) and four-time bronze medallist (1999, 2000, 2002, 2003) of Pacific Curling Championships.

At the national level, she is nine-time New Zealand women's curling champion (2005, 2006, 2007, 2008, 2009, 2010, 2012, 2017, 2018), seven-time New Zealand mixed doubles curling champion (2007, 2009, 2010, 2011, 2015, 2016, 2017).

== Personal life ==
Becker's family is well known in New Zealand as a curling family. Becker's mother, father, two brothers and grandfather have all represented New Zealand on an international scale. Becker's father, Peter Becker, is known as one of the first curlers to represent New Zealand internationally. He was also the coach of the women's team as well as the Secretary of the New Zealand Curling Association. Bridget's older brother, Sean has been the skip of the New Zealand men's national curling team. His wife, Cassie, made her international debut with the New Zealand women's team in 2008. Bridget's younger brother, Scott, is competitive curler too, he was skip of New Zealand men's team on 2018 Pacific-Asia Curling Championships.

Becker works as a legal assistant.

== Teams and events ==
=== Women's ===
Season	Skip	Third	Second	Lead	Alternate	Coach	Events
1998—99	Lisa Anderson	Kylie Petherick	Karen Rawcliffe	Bridget Becker	Natalie Campbell		PCC 1998 (silver)
1999—00	Lisa Anderson	Kylie Petherick	Karen Rawcliffe	Bridget Becker	Natalie Campbell		PCC 1999 (bronze)
2000—01	Lisa Anderson	Kylie Petherick	Karen Rawcliffe	Bridget Becker	Natalie Campbell	Peter Becker, Sharon Delver	PCC 2000 (bronze)
2001—02	Bridget Becker	Kylie Petherick	Natalie Campbell	Catherine Inder		Peter Becker	PCC 2001 (4th)
2002—03	Bridget Becker	Helen Greer	Natalie Campbell	Kylie Petherick	Catherine Inder	Peter Becker	PCC 2002 (bronze)
2003—04	Bridget Becker	Natalie Campbell	Brydie Donald	Sandra Heaney	Catherine Inder	Sharon Delver, John Campbell	PCC 2003 (bronze)
2004—05	Bridget Becker	Natalie Campbell	Brydie Donald	Catherine Inder	Marisa Jones	Sharon Delver	PCC 2004 (4th); NZWCC 2005 (gold)
2005—06	Bridget Becker	Brydie Donald	Natalie Campbell	Catherine Inder	Marisa Jones (PCC)	Peter Becker	PCC 2005 (4th); NZWCC 2006 (gold)
2006—07	Bridget Becker	Brydie Donald	Natalie Campbell	Catherine Inder	Marisa Jones	Peter Becker	PCC 2006 (4th)
2006—07	Bridget Becker	Brydie Donald	Abby Pyle	Cass Becker			NZWCC 2007 (gold)
2007—08	Bridget Becker	Brydie Donald	Abby Lee Pyle	Linda Geary (curler)		Peter Becker, Sharon Delver	PCC 2007 (5th)
2007—08	Bridget Becker	Brydie Donald	Cassie Becker	Linda Geary (curler)			NZWCC 2008 (gold)
2008—09	Bridget Becker	Brydie Donald	Marisa Jones	Catherine Inder	Cassie Becker	Peter Becker, Sharon Delver	PCC 2008 (4th)
2008—09	Bridget Becker	Brydie Donald	Marisa Jones	Linda Geary (curler)			NZWCC 2009 (gold)
2009—10	Bridget Becker	Brydie Donald	Marisa Jones	Natalie Campbell		Peter Becker	PCC 2009 (4th); NZWCC 2010 (gold)
2010—11	Brydie Donald	Bridget Becker	Marisa Jones	Natalie Campbell	Katie Bauer	Peter Becker	PCC 2010 (4th)
2011—12	Bridget Becker	Brydie Donald	Marisa Jones	Natalie Thurlow			NZWCC 2012 (gold)
2012—13	Bridget Becker	Brydie Donald	Marisa Jones	Kelsi Heath	Thivya Jeyaranjan	Rupert Jones	PACC 2012 (5th)
2014	Bridget Becker	Marisa Jones	Kelsi Heath	Waverley Taylor			NZWCC 2014 (bronze)
2015	Wendy Becker	Bridget Becker	Jessica Smith	Holly Thompson			NZWCC 2015 (bronze)
2016	Jessica Smith	Holly Thompson	Waverley Taylor	Bridget Becker	Anna de Boer		NZWCC 2016 (silver)
2017	Bridget Becker	Jessica Smith	Holly Thompson	Emma Sutherland			NZWCC 2017 (gold)
2017—18	Bridget Becker	Jessica Smith	Thivya Jeyaranjan	Holly Thompson	Emma Sutherland	Nelson Ede	PACC 2017 (5th)
2017—18	Bridget Becker	Natalie Thurlow	Abby Pyle	Eloise Pointon			NZWCC 2018 (gold)
2018–19	Bridget Becker	Natalie Thurlow	Abby Peddie	Eloise Pointon	Jessica Smith	Peter de Boer	2019 WQE (8th)

=== Mixed doubles ===
Season	Female	Male	Coach	Events
2007—08	Bridget Becker	Sean Becker		NZMDCC 2007 (gold); WMDCC 2008 (8th)
2008—09	Bridget Becker	Sean Becker		NZMDCC 2008 (silver)
2009—10	Bridget Becker	Sean Becker		NZMDCC 2009 (gold); WMDCC 2010 (silver)
2010—11	Bridget Becker	Sean Becker		NZMDCC 2010 (gold); WMDCC 2011 (14th)
2011—12	Bridget Becker	Sean Becker		NZMDCC 2011 (gold)
2012—13	Bridget Becker	Sean Becker		NZMDCC 2012 (silver)
2014—15	Bridget Becker	Sean Becker		NZMDCC 2014 (silver)
2015—16	Bridget Becker	Scott Becker	Hans Frauenlob	NZMDCC 2015 (gold); WMDCC 2016 (13th)
2016—17	Bridget Becker	Scott Becker	Peter Becker	NZMDCC 2016 (gold); WMDCC 2017 (29th)
2017—18	Bridget Becker	Sean Becker		NZMDCC 2017 (gold)
2018—19	Bridget Becker	Sean Becker		NZMDCC 2018 (silver); WMDCC 2019 (9th)
