= Jessica Smith (curler) =

New Zealand curler (born 1997)

- Curler ♀
- Born: 29 September 1997 (age 29); Ranfurly, New Zealand

Team
- Curling club: Dunedin CC, Dunedin
- Skip: Jessica Smith
- Third: Grace Apuwai-Bishop
- Second: Sophie Tran
- Lead: Temika Apuwai-Bishop
- Mixed doubles partner: Ben Smith

Curling career
- Member Association: New Zealand
- World Championship: 2 (2023, 2024)
- World Mixed Doubles Championship: 3 (2025, 2026, 2027)
- Pacific-Asia Championship: 1 (2017)
- Pan Continental Championship: 2 (2022, 2023)
Medal record
Curling
New Zealand Women's Championship
Gold medal – first place	2017 Dunedin
Gold medal – first place	2022 Naseby
Gold medal – first place	2023 Naseby
Silver medal – second place	2016 Naseby
Silver medal – second place	2018 Naseby
Silver medal – second place	2019 Naseby
Silver medal – second place	2020 Naseby
Bronze medal – third place	2015 Naseby
New Zealand Mixed Doubles Championship
Gold medal – first place	2018 Naseby
Gold medal – first place	2019 Naseby
Gold medal – first place	2024 Naseby
Gold medal – first place	2026 Naseby
Silver medal – second place	2016 Naseby
Silver medal – second place	2022 Naseby
Silver medal – second place	2023 Naseby
Silver medal – second place	2025 Naseby

Jessica Michels (née Smith) (born 29 September 1997) is a New Zealand curler from Invercargill.

At the international level, she competed at the 2023 World Women's Championship (first-ever Worlds for the New Zealand women's curling team), Pacific-Asia Championships 2017 and the 2022 Pan Continental Championships.

At the national level, she is a New Zealand women's and mixed doubles champion curler.

== Personal life ==
Her brother Ben is also a curler; the pair won the New Zealand Mixed Doubles Curling Championship in 2018 and 2019.

In 2020, at the age of 23, she was diagnosed with Hodgkin lymphoma cancer,; and after a difficult treatment, she recovered and returned to the ice, including the international stage, leading the New Zealand women's team to win the right to play at the 2023 World Women's Curling Championship for the first time in Women's World Curling Championship history.

Smith currently works as a nurse.

== Teams and events ==
=== Women's ===
Season	Skip	Third	Second	Lead	Alternate	Coach	Events
2013–14	Eleanor Adviento	Tessa Farley	Holly Thompson	Jessica Smith	Waverley Taylor	Liz Matthews	PAJCC 2014 (4th)
2014—15	Eleanor Adviento	Waverley Taylor	Jessica Smith	Holly Thompson	Eloise Pointon	Nelson Ede	PAJCC 2015 (bronze)
2015—16	Wendy Becker	Bridget Becker	Jessica Smith	Holly Thompson			NZWCC 2015 (bronze)
2015—16	Eleanor Adviento	Jessica Smith	Waverley Taylor	Holly Thompson	Emma Sutherland	Nelson Ede	WJBCC 2016 (5th)
2016—17	Jessica Smith	Holly Thompson	Waverley Taylor	Bridget Becker	Anna de Boer		NZWCC 2016 (silver)
2016—17	Jessica Smith	Holly Thompson	Emma Sutherland	Courtney Smith	Eloise Pointon	Nelson Ede	WJBCC 2017 (16th)
2017—18	Bridget Becker	Jessica Smith	Holly Thompson	Emma Sutherland			NZWCC 2017 (gold)
2017—18	Bridget Becker	Jessica Smith	Thivya Jeyaranjan	Holly Thompson	Emma Sutherland	Nelson Ede	PACC 2017 (5th)
2017—18	Jessica Smith	Holly Thompson	Emma Sutherland	Courtney Smith	Mhairi-Bronté Duncan	Nelson Ede, Peter Becker	WJBCC 2018 (4th)
2018—19	Jessica Smith	Holly Thompson	Mhairi-Bronté Duncan	Courtney Smith			NZWCC 2018 (silver)
2018—19	Bridget Becker	Natalie Thurlow	Abby Peddie	Eloise Pointon	Jessica Smith	Peter de Boer	2019 WQE (8th)
2018—19	Jessica Smith	Holly Thompson	Mhairi-Bronté Duncan	Courtney Smith	Lucy Neilson	Nelson Ede	WJBCC 2019 (Jan) (12th)
2019—20	Jessica Smith	Holly Thompson	Mhairi-Bronté Duncan	Jennifer Stewart			NZWCC 2019 (silver)
2020—21	Jessica Smith	Holly Thompson	Jennifer Stewart	Ruby Kinney			NZWCC 2020 (silver)
2022—23	Jessica Smith	Holly Thompson	Natalie Thurlow	Bridget Becker			NZWCC 2022 (gold)
2022—23	Jessica Smith	Holly Thompson	Natalie Thurlow	Bridget Becker	Ruby Kinney	Nelson Ede	PCCC 2022 (5th)
2022—23	Jessica Smith	Holly Thompson	Bridget Becker	Natalie Thurlow	Ruby Kinney	Nelson Ede	WWCC 2023 (13th)
2023—24	Jessica Smith	Holly Thompson	Bridget Becker	Natalie Thurlow			NZWCC 2023 (gold)
2023—24	Jessica Smith	Courtney Smith	Bridget Becker	Natalie Thurlow	Holly Thompson		PCCC 2023 (5th); WWCC 2024 (13th)

=== Mixed doubles ===
Season	Female	Male	Events
2013–14	Jessica Smith	Joshua Whyte	NZMDCC 2013 (9th)
2014–15	Jessica Smith	Peter Becker	NZMDCC 2014 (9th)
2016–17	Jessica Smith	Ben Smith	NZMDCC 2016 (silver)
2017–18	Jessica Smith	Ben Smith	NZMDCC 2017 (5th)
2018–19	Jessica Smith	Ben Smith	NZMDCC 2018 (gold)
2019–20	Jessica Smith	Ben Smith	NZMDCC 2019 (gold)
2020–21	Jessica Smith	Ben Smith	NZMDCC 2020 (4th)
2022–23	Jessica Smith	Ben Smith	NZMDCC 2022 (silver)
2023–24	Jessica Smith	Ben Smith	NZMDCC 2023 (silver)
2024–25	Jessica Smith	Ben Smith	NZMDCC 2024 (gold); WMDCC 2025 (9th)
2025–26	Jessica Smith	Ben Smith	NZMDCC 2025 (silver); WMDCC 2026 (15th)
