= New Zealand Junior Mixed Doubles Championship =

New Zealand curling championship

The New Zealand Junior Mixed Doubles Curling Championship is the national championship of mixed doubles curling (one man and one woman) in New Zealand. Junior level curlers must be under the age of 21. It has been held annually since 2023 and organized by New Zealand Curling Association.

== List of champions and medallists ==
Team line-ups shows in order: woman, man, coach (if exists).

Year	Host city, arena Dates	Champion	Runner-up	Bronze	Placement at Worlds
2023	St Kilda, Dunedin Ice Stadium; July 21–23	Olivia Russell / Jed Nevill	Lucy Neilson / Darcy Nevill	Tahlia Petersen / William Becker	—
2024	St Kilda, Dunedin Ice Stadium; August 2–4	Ellie McKenzie / Darcy Nevill	Tahlia Petersen / William Loe	Olivia Russell / Jed Nevill	21
2025	St Kilda, Dunedin Ice Stadium; July 17–20	Ellie McKenzie / Jed Nevill	Tahlia Petersen / William Loe	Olivia Russell / Jack Steele	22
2026	St Kilda, Dunedin Ice Stadium; July 30 – August 1	Ellie McKenzie / Jed Nevill	Tahlia Jones / Tom Bankshaw	Indianna Hepi / Jonty Russell	...

== Medal record for curlers ==
(as of after 2026 championship)

Curler	Gold	Silver	Bronze
Jed Nevill	3	0	1
Ellie McKenzie	3	0	0
Darcy Nevill	1	1	0
Olivia Russell	1	0	2
Tahlia Petersen	0	2	1
William Loe	0	2	0
Tom Bankshaw	0	1	0
Tahlia Jones	0	1	0
Lucy Neilson	0	1	0
William Becker	0	0	1
Indianna Hepi	0	0	1
Jonty Russell	0	0	1
Jack Steele	0	0	1

== See also ==
- New Zealand Men's Curling Championship
- New Zealand Women's Curling Championship
- New Zealand Mixed Curling Championship
- New Zealand Mixed Doubles Curling Championship
