= Peter Becker (curler) =

New Zealand curler and coach (born 1949)

- Curler
- Born: 9 June 1949 (age 77); Otago, New Zealand

Team
- Curling club: Ranfurly CC
- Skip: Peter Becker
- Third: Murray Pitts
- Second: Jack Steele
- Lead: Steve Lockhart

Curling career
- Member Association: New Zealand
- Pacific-Asia Championship: 6 (1991, 1993, 1994, 1995, 1996, 2018)
- Other appearances: World Senior Championships: 10 (2003, 2004, 2005, 2007, 2008, 2009, 2010, 2011, 2014, 2024)
Medal record
Curling
Pacific Championships
Bronze medal – third place	1991 Sagamihara
Bronze medal – third place	1993 Adelaida
Bronze medal – third place	1994 Christchurch
Bronze medal – third place	1995 Tokoro
Bronze medal – third place	1996 Sydney
New Zealand Men's Championship
Gold medal – first place	1999
Gold medal – first place	2000
Gold medal – first place	2013 Dunedin
Bronze medal – third place	2009 Dunedin

Peter Becker (born 9 June 1949 in Otago, New Zealand) is a New Zealand curler and curling coach.

At the international level, he is a two-time bronze medallist (1991, 1993, 1994, 1995, 1996) at the Pacific Curling Championships.

At the national level, he is a three-time New Zealand men's champion (1999, 2000, 2013) and two time (2013, 2023) New Zealand senior men's champion.

In 2022, he was inducted into the World Curling Hall of Fame.

== Personal life ==
Becker comes from a family of curlers. His wife, two sons, daughter and father have all represented New Zealand on an international scale. His father William Becker was one of the first men who curled in New Zealand. Peter's older son, Sean, is one of the most successful and well known New Zealand curlers. His younger son, Scott, is a competitive curler too, and was skip of the New Zealand men's team at the 2018 Pacific-Asia Curling Championships. His daughter, Bridget has been the skip of the New Zealand women's national curling team, and was a silver medallist at the 2010 World Mixed Doubles Curling Championship, and a silver and bronze medallist at the Pacific-Asia Championships.

== Teams and events ==
=== Men's ===
Season	Skip	Third	Second	Lead	Alternate	Coach	Events
1991–92	Peter Becker	Edwin Harley	Jock Kearney	Barry Brown	Stewart McKnight		PCC 1991 (bronze)
1993–94	Peter Becker	Barry Brown	John Campbell	Ross A. Stevens	Edwin Harley		PCC 1993 (bronze)
1994–95	Peter Becker	Barry Brown	Ross A. Stevens	Richard Morgan	John Campbell	Edwin Harley	PCC 1994 (bronze)
1995–96	Peter Becker	Sean Becker	Allan McLean	Lorne De Pape	Darren Carson	Edwin Harley	PCC 1995 (bronze)
1996–97	Peter Becker	Sean Becker	Jim Allan	Ross A. Stevens	Lorne De Pape	Edwin Harley	PCC 1996 (bronze)
1999–00	Peter Becker	Merv Jamieson	Darren Carson	Sean Becker			NZMCC 1999 (gold)
2000–01	Peter Becker	Merv Jamieson	Darren Carson	Sean Becker			NZMCC 2000 (gold)
2002–03	Peter Becker	Allan McLean	Mervyn Jamieson	Edwin Harley			WSCC 2003 (15th)
2003–04	John Allen	Len McSaveney	Len Hill	Peter Taylor	Peter Becker		WSCC 2004 (15th)
2004–05	Peter Becker	Barry Brown	John Campbell	Ross A. Stevens	Edwin Harley		WSCC 2005 (15th)
2006–07	Peter Becker	Richard Morgan	John Allen	John Sanders	Murray Petherick		WSCC 2007 (7th)
2007–08	Peter Becker	Richard Morgan	Murray Petherick	John Sanders	Nelson Ede		WSCC 2008 (12th)
2008–09	Peter Becker	Richard Morgan	Murray Petherick	John Sanders			NZMCC 2008 (4th)
2008–09	Peter Becker	Richard Morgan	Nelson Ede	David Greer	John Sanders		WSCC 2009 (9th)
2009–10	Peter Becker	Nelson Ede	John Sanders	Neil Pritchard			NZMCC 2009 (bronze)
2009–10	Peter Becker	Nelson Ede	David Greer	John Sanders	Murray Petherick		WSCC 2010 (10th)
2010–11	Peter Becker	Richard Morgan	David Greer	John Sanders			NZMCC 2010 (7th)
2010–11	Peter Becker	Richard Morgan	Nelson Ede	David Greer	John Sanders (WSCC)		WSCC 2011 (6th); NZMCC 2011 (8th)
2011–12	Peter Becker	Richard Morgan	Nelson Ede	Dave Greer			NZSCC 2011 (silver)
2012–13	Peter Becker	Richard Morgan	Nelson Ede	John Sanders			NZSCC 2012 (bronze)
2013–14	Peter Becker	Dave Greer	Nelson Ede	John Sanders			NZMCC 2013 (gold)
2013–14	Peter Becker	Dave Greer	Richard Morgan	Nelson Ede	John Sanders		NZSCC 2013 (gold)
2013–14	Peter Becker	Richard Morgan	Nelson Ede	David Greer	John Sanders		WSCC 2014 (22nd)
2014–15	Peter Becker	Richard Morgan	Nelson Ede	David Greer	John Sanders		NZMCC 2014 (4th)
2014–15	Peter Becker	Richard Morgan	Nelson Ede	John Sanders			NZSCC 2014 (silver); NZMCC 2015 (4th)
2015–16	Peter Becker	Richard Morgan	Nelson Ede	John Sanders			NZSCC 2015 (silver)
2017–18	Peter Becker	Richard Morgan	Nelson Ede	John Sanders			NZMCC 2017 (6th)
2017–18	Peter Becker	David Greer	Nelson Ede	John Sanders			NZSCC 2017 (silver)
2018–19	Peter Becker	Richard Morgan	Nelson Ede	John Sanders			NZMCC 2018 (6th)
2018–19	Scott Becker	Simon Neilson	Anton Hood	Warren Dobson	Peter Becker	Peter Becker	PACC 2018 (4th)
2023–24	Peter Becker	Murray Pitts	Jack Steele	Steve Lockhart			NZMCC 2023 (8th)

=== Mixed doubles ===
Season	Female	Male	Events
2008–09	Brittany Taylor	Peter Becker	NZMDCC 2008 (10th)
2009–10	Cass Becker	Peter Becker	NZMDCC 2009 (4th)
2010–11	Wendy Becker	Peter Becker	NZMDCC 2010 (5th)
2012–13	Wendy Becker	Peter Becker	NZMDCC 2012 (5th)
2013–14	Wendy Becker	Peter Becker	NZMDCC 2013 (11th)
2014–15	Jessica Smith	Peter Becker	NZMDCC 2014 (9th)
2015–16	Wendy Becker	Peter Becker	NZMDCC 2015 (6th)

== Record as a coach of national teams ==
Year	Tournament, event	National team	Place
1999	1999 Pacific Curling Championships	New Zealand (women)	3rd place, bronze medalist(s)
2000	2000 Pacific Curling Championships	New Zealand (women)	3rd place, bronze medalist(s)
2001	2001 Pacific Curling Championships	New Zealand (women)	4
2002	2002 Pacific Curling Championships	New Zealand (women)	3rd place, bronze medalist(s)
2003	2003 Pacific Curling Championships	New Zealand (men)	1st place, gold medalist(s)
2004	2004 World Men's Curling Championship	New Zealand (men)	7
2004	2004 Pacific Curling Championships	New Zealand (men)	1st place, gold medalist(s)
2005	2005 World Men's Curling Championship	New Zealand (men)	8
2005	2005 Pacific Curling Championships	New Zealand (men)	3rd place, bronze medalist(s)
2006	2006 Pacific-Asia Junior Curling Championships	New Zealand (junior men)	4
2006	2006 Winter Olympics	New Zealand (men)	10
2006	2006 Pacific Curling Championships	New Zealand (women)	4
2007	2007 Pacific-Asia Junior Curling Championships	New Zealand (junior women)	3rd place, bronze medalist(s)
2007	2007 Pacific Curling Championships	New Zealand (men)	3rd place, bronze medalist(s)
2007	2007 Pacific Curling Championships	New Zealand (women)	5
2008	2008 Pacific-Asia Junior Curling Championships	New Zealand (junior men)	4
2008	2008 Pacific Curling Championships	New Zealand (men)	3rd place, bronze medalist(s)
2008	2008 Pacific Curling Championships	New Zealand (women)	4
2009	2009 Pacific-Asia Junior Curling Championships	New Zealand (junior men)	3rd place, bronze medalist(s)
2009	2009 Pacific Curling Championships	New Zealand (women)	4
2010	2010 Pacific Curling Championships	New Zealand (men)	4
2010	2010 Pacific Curling Championships	New Zealand (women)	4
2011	2011 Pacific-Asia Curling Championships	New Zealand (men)	2nd place, silver medalist(s)
2012	2012 Pacific-Asia Junior Curling Championships	New Zealand (junior men)	4
2012	2012 Winter Youth Olympics	New Zealand (mixed team)	13
2012	2012 Winter Youth Olympics	New Zealand (mixed double)	17
2012	2012 World Men's Curling Championship	New Zealand (men)	5
2012	2012 Pacific-Asia Curling Championships	New Zealand (men)	6
2013	2013 Pacific-Asia Curling Championships	New Zealand (men)	4
2015	2015 Pacific-Asia Junior Curling Championships	New Zealand (junior men)	4
2016	2016 Winter Youth Olympics	New Zealand (mixed team)	13
2016	2016 Winter Youth Olympics	New Zealand (mixed double)	17
2016	2016 Winter Youth Olympics	New Zealand (mixed double)	5
2016	2016 Pacific-Asia Curling Championships	New Zealand (men)	5
2017	2017 World Junior B Curling Championships	New Zealand (junior men)	16
2017	2017 World Mixed Doubles Curling Championship	New Zealand (mixed double)	29
2017	2017 Pacific-Asia Curling Championships	New Zealand (men)	5
2018	2018 World Junior B Curling Championships	New Zealand (junior men)	5
2018	2018 World Junior B Curling Championships	New Zealand (junior women)	4
2018	2018 Pacific-Asia Curling Championships	New Zealand (men)	4
