= Hunter Walker (curler) =

New Zealand curler (born 2002)

- Curler
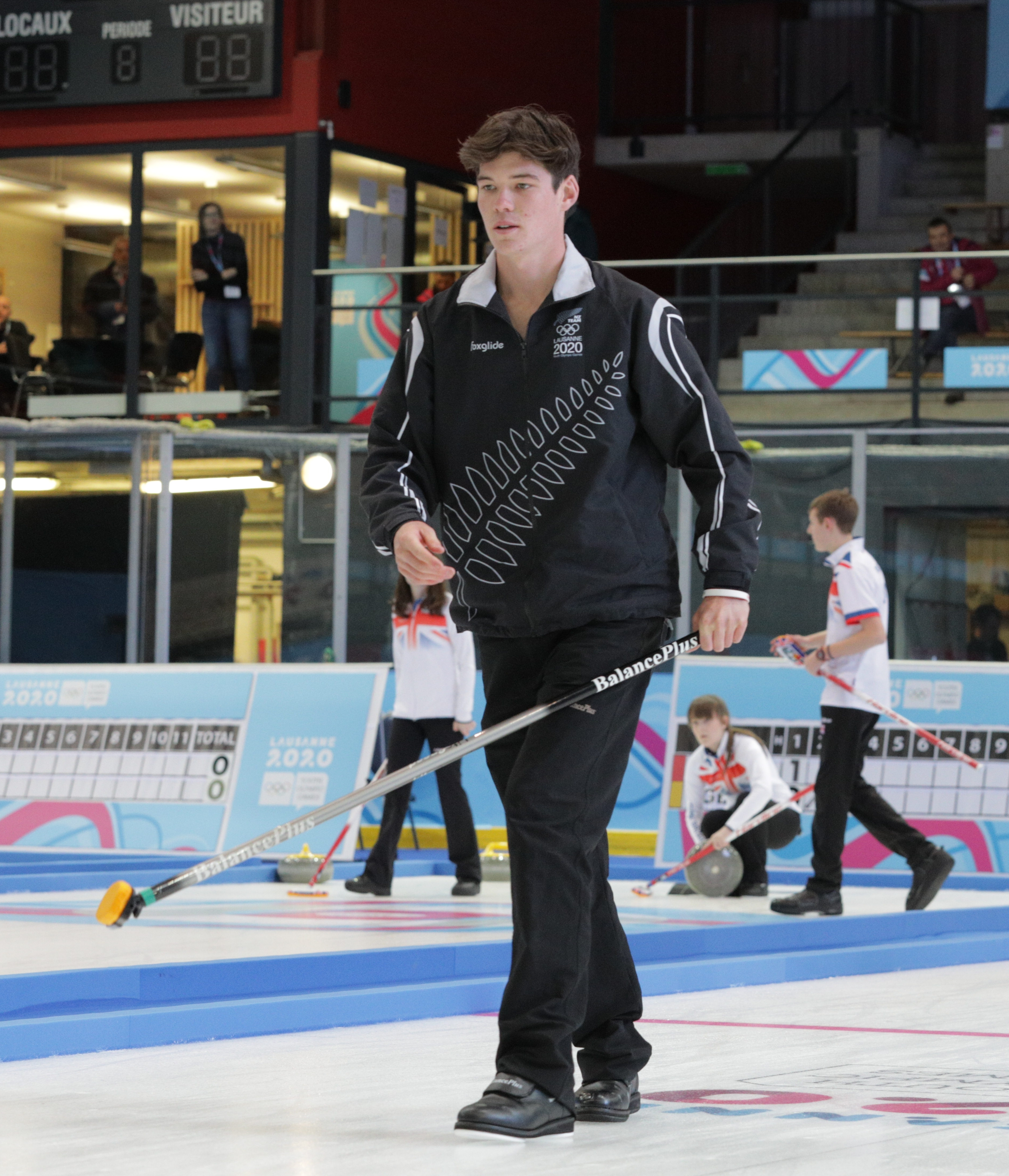
- Born: 2 February 2002 (age 24); Ranfurly, New Zealand

Team
- Skip: Anton Hood
- Third: Ben Smith
- Second: Brett Sargon
- Lead: Hunter Walker
- Alternate: Jared Palanuik

Curling career
- Member Association: New Zealand
- World Championship: 2 (2023, 2024)
- Pan Continental Championship: 3 (2022, 2023, 2024)

Hunter Walker (born 2 February 2002) is a New Zealand curler from Dunedin. He currently plays lead on the New Zealand men's national team.

== Career ==
=== Juniors ===
Walker began curling at the age of 7 at the Maniototo Curling Rink in Naseby.

Walker joined the New Zealand junior team in 2019, throwing lead rocks for the country, on a rink skipped by Matthew Neilson. The team played at the 2019 World Junior-B Curling Championships, Walker's first international event. There, the team finished pool play with a 5–2 record, and went on to win all three of their playoff games to claim the gold medal. This promoted New Zealand to the 2019 World Junior Curling Championships. There, the team finished the round-robin with a 4–5 record, finishing sixth overall, and avoiding relegation to the B tournament for the following season. At the 2020 World Junior Curling Championships, the team finished with a 3–6 record, in 8th place, relegating their country to the B event, which was cancelled due to the COVID-19 pandemic. Walker did not play on the junior team for the 2021–22 season, but skipped the team at the 2022 World Junior-B Curling Championships. There, he led the New Zealand team of Jayden Bishop, Sam Flanagan and William Becker to a 4–2 record, just missing the playoffs, and finishing 11th overall.

As a junior, Walker also competed at the 2020 Winter Youth Olympics, where he skipped the New Zealand team, which also consisted of Zoe Harman, Becker and Lucy Neilson. Walker led the team to a 4–1 finish in group play, then defeated Germany in the quarterfinals, before losing to Japan in the semifinals. In the bronze medal game, they lost to Russia, settling for fourth. In the mixed doubles event, Walker was teamed up with Brazil's Leticia Cid. The pair lost their only game, against Canada's Emily Deschenes and Spain's Oriol Gastó.

=== Men's ===
Walker joined the New Zealand men's team (skipped by Anton Hood) for the 2022–23 curling season as the team's lead. The team represented New Zealand at the inaugural Pan Continental Curling Championships in 2022. There, the team finished with a 3–4 record, finishing in fifth place, but good enough to qualify for the 2023 World Men's Curling Championship, Walker's first men's world championship appearance. It was New Zealand's first trip to the Worlds since 2012.

In September 2023, to be able to train and attend tournaments in Canada for the 2023–24 curling season, the New Zealand team made news by moving into a retirement residence in Calgary, Alberta for training and lived there until March 2024. During the season, the team represented New Zealand at the 2023 Pan Continental Curling Championships, where they finished with a 4–3 record, missing the playoffs but qualifying New Zealand for their second consecutive world championship appearance in the 2024 World Men's Curling Championship. At the Worlds, the team would struggle, finishing with an 0–12 record. The team would represent New Zealand again at the 2025 Pan Continental Curling Championships, finishing with a 2–5 record, failing to go to their third consecutive world championship. However, their appearance at the 2024 Worlds qualified the team to represent New Zealand at the 2025 Pre-Olympic Qualification Event, in an attempt to qualify for the 2026 Winter Olympics.

=== National championships ===
Walker was on teams that were runners-up at the New Zealand Men's Curling Championship in 2019 and 2021. Neilson skipped the team in 2019, while Hood skipped the team in 2021.

== Personal life ==
Walker works as a building apprentice. His brother Hamish is also a curler, while his great-grandfather and grandmother have both competed for New Zealand in curling. He went to high school at Otago Boys' High School in Dunedin. Growing up, he lived on a farm and played rugby union.
