= New Zealand Men's Curling Championship =

The New Zealand Men's Curling Championship is the national championship of men's curling in New Zealand. It has been held annually since 2005. From 1994 to 2004 the national champions were the winners of the Wendorf Rock, and the event was open to both genders. Some winning teams had men's and women's players.

== List of champions ==
=== The Wendorf Rock ===
Year	Skip	Club
1994	Edwin Harley	Taieri
1995	Fen Greer (Note: Women’s only team)	Kyeburn
1996	Edwin Harley	Taieri
1997	Sean Becker	Ranfurly
1998	Jim Allan	Dunedin
1999	Peter Becker	Ranfurly
2000	Peter Becker	Ranfurly
2001	Hans Frauenlob	Auckland
2002	Sean Becker	Maniototo
2003	Dan Mustapic	Dunedin
2004	Warren Dobson	Maniototo

=== New Zealand Curling Championship—Men ===
Year	Skip	Club
2005	Sean Becker	
2006	Dan Mustapic	
2007	Sean Becker	
2008	Sean Becker	Maniototo
2009	Sean Becker	Maniototo
2010	Sean Becker	Maniototo
2011	Sean Becker	Maniototo
2012	Hans Frauenlob	Auckland
2013	Peter Becker	
2014	Sean Becker	
2015	Sean Becker	
2016	Peter de Boer	
2017	Sean Becker	
2018	Sean Becker	
2019	Peter de Boer	
2020	Peter de Boer	
2021	Sean Becker	
2022	Sean Becker	
2023	Anton Hood	
2024	Anton Hood	
2025	Sean Becker	
2026	Anton Hood	

== See also ==
- New Zealand Women's Curling Championship
- New Zealand Mixed Doubles Curling Championship
- New Zealand Mixed Curling Championship
- New Zealand Junior Mixed Doubles Championship
