= 2016 World Junior B Curling Championships =

- Host city: Lohja, Finland
- Arena: Kisakallio Sports Institute
- Dates: January 3–10
- Men's winner: Russia
- Skip: Alexander Eremin
- Fourth: Timur Gadzhikhanov
- Third: Daniil Goriachev
- Second: Dmitry Solomatin
- Finalist: Denmark (Tobias Thune)
- Women's winner: Russia
- Skip: Evgeniya Demkina
- Fourth: Uliana Vasileva
- Third: Maria Baksheeva
- Second: Ekaterina Kuzmina
- Finalist: Japan (Ayano Tsuchiya)

The 2016 World Junior B Curling Championships was held from January 3 to 10 at the Kisakallio Sports Institute in Lohja, Finland. The top three men’s and women’s teams at the World Junior B Curling Championships qualified for the 2016 World Junior Curling Championships.

== Men ==
=== Round-robin standings ===
Key
Teams to Playoffs
Teams to Qualification Game

Group A	Skip	W	L
Germany	Marc Muskatewitz	6	1
South Korea	Lee Ki-jeong	6	1
Poland	Michał Janowski	5	2
Japan	Kazushi Niino	4	3
Latvia	Jānis Bremanis	4	3
New Zealand	Simon Neilson	2	5
Lithuania	Matas Cepulis	1	6
Hong Kong	Jeffrey Choi	0	7

Group B	Skip	W	L
Italy	Amos Mosaner	7	0
China	Zhang Tianya	6	1
Czech Republic	Marek Černovský	5	2
France	Theo Ducroz	3	4
Australia	Dean Hewitt	3	4
Netherlands	Stefano Miog	2	5
Hungary	Viktor Nagy	1	6
Kazakhstan	Daniel Alex Kim	1	6

Group C	Skip	W	L
Denmark	Tobias Thune	6	1
Russia	Alexander Eremin	6	1
Spain	Gontzal García	5	2
England	Olly Kendall	5	2
Slovenia	Stefan Sever	3	4
Finland	Melker Lundberg	1	6
Austria	Mathias Genner	1	6
Estonia	Sander Rõuk	1	6

=== Qualification Game ===
Saturday, January 9, 9:00

Team	1	2	3	4	5	6	7	8	Final
Czech Republic (Černovský)	1	1	0	1	0	0	0	1	4
Spain (García) 🔨	0	0	1	0	0	1	1	0	3

=== Playoffs ===
Quarterfinals
C2	Russia	4
B3	Czech Republic	3
A1	Germany	2
B2	China	0
C1	Denmark	10
A3	Poland	3
B1	Italy	5
A2	South Korea	7

Semifinals
C2	Russia	6
A1	Germany	5
C1	Denmark	5
A2	South Korea	3

Gold-medal game
C2	Russia	5
C1	Denmark	2

Bronze-medal game
A1	Germany	2
A2	South Korea	4

==== Quarterfinals ====
Saturday, January 9, 14:00

Sheet A	1	2	3	4	5	6	7	8	9	Final
Russia (Eremin) 🔨	1	1	0	1	0	0	0	0	1	4
Czech Republic (Černovský)	0	0	2	0	0	0	0	1	0	3

Sheet B	1	2	3	4	5	6	7	8	Final
Germany (Muskatewitz) 🔨	0	0	0	0	0	2	0	X	2
China (Zhang)	0	0	0	0	0	0	0	X	0

Sheet C	1	2	3	4	5	6	7	8	Final
Denmark (Thune)	0	3	1	0	4	2	X	X	10
Poland (Janowski) 🔨	1	0	0	2	0	0	X	X	3

Sheet D	1	2	3	4	5	6	7	8	Final
Italy (Mosaner) 🔨	0	0	0	3	1	0	1	0	5
South Korea (Lee)	1	2	2	0	0	1	0	1	7

==== Semifinals ====
Sunday, January 10, 9:00

Sheet A	1	2	3	4	5	6	7	8	9	Final
Russia (Eremin)	0	0	0	2	0	2	0	1	1	6
Germany (Muskatewitz) 🔨	0	0	2	0	1	0	2	0	0	5

Sheet C	1	2	3	4	5	6	7	8	Final
Denmark (Thune) 🔨	2	0	0	3	0	0	0	X	5
South Korea (Lee)	0	2	0	0	1	0	0	X	3

==== Bronze-medal game ====
Sunday, January 10, 14:00

Sheet D	1	2	3	4	5	6	7	8	9	Final
Germany (Muskatewitz) 🔨	1	0	0	0	0	1	0	0	0	2
South Korea (Lee)	0	1	1	0	0	0	0	0	2	4

==== Gold-medal game ====
Sunday, January 10, 14:00

Sheet B	1	2	3	4	5	6	7	8	Final
Russia (Eremin)	0	1	3	0	1	0	0	X	5
Denmark (Thune) 🔨	0	0	0	1	0	1	0	X	2

== Women ==
=== Round-robin standings ===
Key
Teams to Playoffs
Teams to Qualification Game

Group A	Skip	W	L
Russia	Evgeniya Demkina	6	0
Japan	Ayano Tsuchiya	5	1
New Zealand	Eleanor Adviento	4	2
Latvia	Santa Blumberga	3	3
Norway	Mari Forbregd	2	4
Romania	Iulia Traila	1	5
Spain	Alicia Munte	0	6

Group B	Skip	W	L
Estonia	Marie Turmann	6	0
China	Jiang Xindi	5	1
Poland	Marta Pluta	4	2
Germany	Maike Beer	3	3
Finland	Mira Lehtonen	2	4
Australia	Samantha Jeffs	1	5
Kazakhstan	Regina Lankina	0	6

Group C	Skip	W	L
Hungary	Dorottya Palancsa	6	0
Czech Republic	Alžběta Baudyšová	5	1
Italy	Angela Romei	3	3
Denmark	Mathilde Halse	3	3
Slovenia	Nika Cerne	2	4
England	Lucy Sparks	2	4
Austria	Celine Moser	0	6

=== Qualification Game ===
Saturday, January 9, 14:00

Team	1	2	3	4	5	6	7	8	9	Final
Poland (Pluta) 🔨	1	0	0	0	2	1	2	0	1	7
Italy (Romei)	0	0	2	3	0	0	0	1	0	6

=== Playoffs ===
Quarterfinals
A1	Russia	6
C2	Czech Republic	5
B1	Estonia	5
A3	New Zealand	4
C1	Hungary	8
B2	China	2
A2	Japan	5
B3	Poland	3

Semifinals
A1	Russia	4
B1	Estonia	2
C1	Hungary	3
A2	Japan	5

Gold-medal game
A1	Russia	6
A2	Japan	3

Bronze-medal game
B1	Estonia	2
C1	Hungary	9

==== Quarterfinals ====
Saturday, January 9, 19:00

Sheet A	1	2	3	4	5	6	7	8	Final
Hungary (Palancsa) 🔨	1	0	1	2	1	0	3	X	8
China (Jiang)	0	1	0	0	0	1	0	X	2

Sheet B	1	2	3	4	5	6	7	8	Final
Russia (Demkina)	0	2	0	0	3	0	0	1	6
Czech Republic (Baudysova) 🔨	2	0	0	1	0	2	0	0	5

Sheet C	1	2	3	4	5	6	7	8	Final
Japan (Tsuchiya)	0	0	5	0	0	0	0	X	5
Poland (Pluta) 🔨	1	0	0	0	1	0	1	X	3

Sheet D	1	2	3	4	5	6	7	8	Final
Estonia (Turmann) 🔨	1	0	1	2	0	0	1	0	5
New Zealand (Adviento)	0	1	0	0	1	1	0	1	4

==== Semifinals ====
Sunday, January 10, 9:00

Sheet B	1	2	3	4	5	6	7	8	Final
Russia (Demkina) 🔨	0	0	0	0	2	1	1	X	4
Estonia (Turmann)	0	1	1	0	0	0	0	X	2

Sheet D	1	2	3	4	5	6	7	8	Final
Hungary (Palancsa) 🔨	1	0	1	0	0	1	0	X	3
Japan (Tsuchiya)	0	2	0	1	1	0	1	X	5

==== Bronze-medal game ====
Sunday, January 10, 14:00

Sheet A	1	2	3	4	5	6	7	8	Final
Estonia (Turmann)	0	0	1	0	0	1	0	X	2
Hungary (Palancsa) 🔨	1	1	0	2	4	0	1	X	9

==== Gold-medal game ====
Sunday, January 10, 14:00

Sheet C	1	2	3	4	5	6	7	8	Final
Russia (Demkina) 🔨	0	2	0	2	0	2	0	X	6
Japan (Tsuchiya)	0	0	1	0	1	0	1	X	3
