= Lorne De Pape =

Canadian-born New Zealand curler

Lorne De Pape (born 18 April 1955 in Saint Boniface, Manitoba) is a Canadian-born New Zealand curler. He moved to New Zealand in the 1990s due to his job for Monsanto. He competed for New Zealand at the 2006 Winter Olympics despite the country having limited curling resources at the time. His curling teammates were skip Sean Becker, Hans Frauenlob, Dan Mustapic and Warren Dobson. Before that he had helped found the Auckland Curling Club in 1996 and has won 4 gold medals at the Pacific Curling Championships.
