= 2019 World Junior-B Curling Championships (January) =

- Host city: Lohja, Finland
- Arena: Kisakallio Sports Institute
- Dates: January 2–10
- Men's winner: New Zealand
- Skip: Matthew Neilson
- Fourth: Anton Hood
- Third: Ben Smith
- Lead: Hunter Walker
- Alternate: Jayden Bishop
- Finalist: Italy (Luca Rizzolli)
- Women's winner: Scotland
- Skip: Beth Farmer
- Third: Kirstin Bousie
- Second: Katie McMillan
- Lead: Nicola Joiner
- Alternate: Amy Bryce
- Finalist: Russia (Vlada Rumiantseva)

The 2019 World Junior-B Curling Championships were held from January 2 to 10 at the Kisakallio Sports Institute in Lohja, Finland.

== Men ==
=== Round-robin standings ===
Final round-robin standings

Key
Teams to playoffs
Teams to qualification game

Group A	Skip	W	L
South Korea	Lee Jae-beom	6	2
England	Jotham Sugden	6	2
France	Eddy Mercier	5	3
Poland	Michał Janowski	5	3
Spain	Gontzal García	5	3
Netherlands	Jop Kuijpers	4	4
Denmark	Jonathan Vilandt	4	4
Belarus	Aliaksandr; Dziameshchanka	1	7
Chinese Taipei	Samuel Chang	0	8

Group B	Skip	W	L
Italy	Luca Rizzolli	6	1
Russia	German Doronin	5	2
Latvia	Krišs Vonda	4	3
Hungary	Lőrinc Tatár	4	3
Slovakia	Jakub Červenka	3	4
Czech Republic	Adam Podolka	3	4
Austria	Florian Mavec	3	4
Hong Kong	Cheng Ching Nam	0	7

Group C	Skip	W	L
China	Wang Weihaoping	5	2
New Zealand	Matthew Neilson	5	2
Turkey	Oğuzhan Karakurt	5	2
Japan	Kei Kamada	4	3
Slovenia	Štefan Sever	4	3
Finland	Jüso Virtäla	3	4
Kazakhstan	Dinislam Aimishev	1	6
Australia	Mitchell Thomas	1	6

=== Qualification game ===
Wednesday, January 9, 14:00

Team	1	2	3	4	5	6	7	8	Final
France (Mercier)	0	1	0	2	0	4	0	0	7
Latvia (Vonda) 🔨	2	0	1	0	1	0	1	1	6

=== Playoffs ===
Quarterfinals
1	China	7
8	France	4
4	New Zealand	6
5	Russia	4
3	Italy	9
6	England	2
2	South Korea	5
7	Turkey	4

Semi-finals
1	China	5
4	New Zealand	6
3	Italy	7
2	South Korea	6

Gold medal game
4	New Zealand	8
3	Italy	4
Third place
1	China	6
2	South Korea	4

==== Quarter-finals ====
Wednesday, January 9, 20:00

Team	1	2	3	4	5	6	7	8	Final
China (Wang)	0	0	1	1	0	3	0	2	7
France (Mercier) 🔨	0	0	0	0	2	0	2	0	4

Team	1	2	3	4	5	6	7	8	Final
New Zealand (Neilson)	0	0	2	1	0	1	0	2	6
Russia (Doronin) 🔨	0	1	0	0	2	0	1	0	4

Team	1	2	3	4	5	6	7	8	Final
Italy (Rizzolli) 🔨	2	0	0	2	2	3	X	X	9
England (Sugden)	0	1	1	0	0	0	X	X	2

Team	1	2	3	4	5	6	7	8	9	Final
South Korea (Lee) 🔨	0	0	1	0	2	1	0	0	1	5
Turkey (Karakurt)	0	1	0	1	0	0	2	0	0	4

==== Semi-finals ====
Thursday, January 10, 09:00

Team	1	2	3	4	5	6	7	8	9	Final
China (Wang) 🔨	0	0	3	0	1	0	1	0	0	5
New Zealand (Neilson)	0	0	0	2	0	1	0	2	1	6

Team	1	2	3	4	5	6	7	8	9	Final
Italy (Rizzolli) 🔨	1	0	0	1	2	1	1	0	1	7
South Korea (Lee)	0	2	2	0	0	0	0	2	0	6

==== Bronze medal game ====
Thursday, January 10, 14:00

Team	1	2	3	4	5	6	7	8	Final
China (Wang)	0	0	2	0	2	0	2	0	6
South Korea (Lee) 🔨	0	1	0	1	0	1	0	1	4

==== Gold medal game ====
Thursday, January 10, 14:00

Team	1	2	3	4	5	6	7	8	Final
New Zealand (Neilson) 🔨	1	0	2	0	4	0	1	X	8
Italy (Rizzolli)	0	1	0	1	0	2	0	X	4

== Women ==
=== Round-robin standings ===
Final round-robin standings

Key
Teams to playoffs
Teams to qualification game

Group A	Skip	W	L
Scotland	Beth Farmer	6	0
Poland	Daria Chmarra	5	1
Germany	Mia Höhne	4	2
New Zealand	Jessica Smith	3	3
Austria	Sara Haidinger	2	4
Finland	Jasmin Satto	1	5
Spain	Patricia Ruiz	0	6

Group B	Skip	W	L
Russia	Vlada Rumiantseva	6	0
Japan	Ami Enami	5	1
England	Sydney Boyd	3	3
Italy	Stefania Constantini	3	3
Kazakhstan	Sitora Alliyarova	3	3
Australia	Tahli Gill	1	5
Estonia	Britta Sillaots	0	6

Group C	Skip	W	L
Denmark	Mathilde Halse	6	0
Hungary	Linda Joo	4	2
Czech Republic	Laura Klímová	4	2
Turkey	Mihriban Polat	3	3
Latvia	Evelīna Barone	3	3
Slovenia	Liza Gregori	1	5
Belarus	Aliaksandra Kurilkina	0	6

=== Qualification game ===
Wednesday, January 9, 08:00

Team	1	2	3	4	5	6	7	8	Final
Germany (Höhne)	0	0	3	2	0	0	0	X	5
Czech Republic (Klímová) 🔨	0	1	0	0	3	0	0	X	4

=== Playoffs ===
Quarterfinals
1	Scotland	7
8	Germany	4
4	Poland	5
5	Japan	7
3	Denmark	2
6	Hungary	3
2	Russia	10
7	England	5

Semi-finals
1	Scotland	6
5	Japan	5
6	Hungary	3
2	Russia	12

Gold medal game
1	Scotland	5
2	Russia	3
Third place
5	Japan	6
6	Hungary	5

==== Quarter-finals ====
Wednesday, January 9, 14:00

Team	1	2	3	4	5	6	7	8	Final
Scotland (Farmer) 🔨	0	2	1	1	0	2	0	1	7
Germany (Höhne)	1	0	0	0	1	0	2	0	4

Team	1	2	3	4	5	6	7	8	Final
Poland (Chmarra) 🔨	1	1	0	1	0	0	2	0	5
Japan (Enami)	0	0	1	0	3	1	0	2	7

Team	1	2	3	4	5	6	7	8	Final
Denmark (Halse) 🔨	0	0	0	1	1	0	0	0	2
Hungary (Joo)	0	0	0	0	0	1	1	1	3

Team	1	2	3	4	5	6	7	8	Final
Russia (Rumiantseva) 🔨	0	2	2	0	3	0	3	X	10
England (Boyd)	2	0	0	1	0	2	0	X	5

==== Semi-finals ====
Thursday, January 10, 09:00

Team	1	2	3	4	5	6	7	8	Final
Scotland (Farmer) 🔨	0	2	2	0	0	1	0	1	6
Japan (Enami)	2	0	0	1	1	0	1	0	5

Team	1	2	3	4	5	6	7	8	Final
Hungary (Joo) 🔨	1	0	0	0	2	0	X	X	3
Russia (Rumiantseva)	0	2	2	3	0	5	X	X	12

==== Bronze medal game ====
Thursday, January 10, 14:00

Team	1	2	3	4	5	6	7	8	Final
Japan (Enami) 🔨	2	0	2	0	0	0	0	2	6
Hungary (Joo)	0	2	0	0	1	1	1	0	5

==== Gold medal game ====
Thursday, January 10, 14:00

Team	1	2	3	4	5	6	7	8	Final
Scotland (Farmer)	0	1	0	1	0	1	1	1	5
Russia (Rumiantseva) 🔨	0	0	1	0	2	0	0	0	3
