= Sean Becker =

New Zealand curler (born 1975)

- Curler
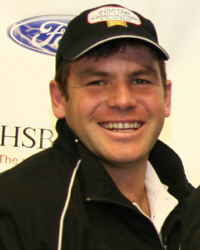
- Born: 7 July 1975 (age 51); Ranfurly, New Zealand

Team
- Curling club: Ranfurly Curling Club; Ranfurly, New Zealand
- Skip: Sean Becker
- Third: Warren Dobson
- Second: Scott Becker
- Lead: James Becker
- Alternate: Warren Kearny
- Mixed doubles partner: Bridget Becker

Curling career
- Member Association: New Zealand
- World Championship: 5 (1999, 2001, 2004, 2005, 2012)
- World Mixed Doubles Championship: 4 (2008, 2010, 2011, 2019)
- Pacific-Asia Championship: 20 (1995, 1996, 1997, 1998, 1999, 2000, 2001, 2002, 2003, 2004, 2005, 2007, 2008, 2010, 2011, 2012, 2013, 2015, 2016, 2017)
- Pan Continental Championship: 1 (2025)
- Olympic: 1 (2006)
Medal record
Curling
Pacific Curling Championships
Gold medal – first place	2004 Chuncheon
Gold medal – first place	2003 Aomori
Gold medal – first place	2000 Esquimalt
Gold medal – first place	1998 Qualicum Beach
Silver medal – second place	2001 Jeonju
Bronze medal – third place	2008 Naseby
Bronze medal – third place	2007 Beijing
Bronze medal – third place	2005 Taipei
Bronze medal – third place	1999 Tokoro
Bronze medal – third place	1997 Karuizawa
Bronze medal – third place	1996 Sydney
Bronze medal – third place	1995 Tokoro
World Mixed Doubles Curling Championship
Silver medal – second place	2010 Chelyabinsk

Sean Peter Becker (born 7 July 1975 in Ranfurly) is a New Zealand curler. He is currently the coach of the New Zealand women's national team.

== Career ==
Becker was the skip for New Zealand teams which won three Pacific Curling Championships in 1998, 2003, and 2004. He has also played for the New Zealand team in five World Men's Championships, skipping the team at the 1999 (0-9; 10th), the 2004 (3-6; 7th), and the 2005 World Men's Curling Championship(5-6; 8th). He also played third for New Zealand at the 2001 (2-7; 9th) and 2012 World Men's Curling Championships (7-5; 5th). He represented New Zealand at the 2006 Winter Olympics as the team's skip. He was the only member of the New Zealand team to be originally from New Zealand. His was the first men's curling team to represent New Zealand at the Olympics; unfortunately, they finished last out of 10 teams without notching a victory. His curling team consisted of Lorne de Pape, Hans Frauenlob, Dan Mustapic and Warren Dobson. He carried the flag at the opening and closing ceremonies for his nation.

Following the Olympic Games in 2006, Becker forged a new team of upcoming New Zealand talent including his younger brother, Scott. His team included Scott Becker, Rupert Jones, Warren Kearney and Warren Dobson. He then went on to skip New Zealand in the 2007, 2008, 2010 and 2017 Pacific-Asia Curling Championships and played third for New Zealand at the 2011, 2012, 2013, 2015 and 2016 Pacific-Asia Championships.

In mixed doubles play, Becker has represented New Zealand in four World Mixed Doubles Curling Championships with sister Bridget, winning a silver medal at the 2010 World Mixed Doubles Curling Championship.

== Personal life ==
Aside from curling, Sean Becker's occupation is a sheep farmer. Becker's family is well known as a curling family. Becker's mother, father, sister, grandfather, and younger brother have all represented New Zealand on an international scale. Becker's father, Peter Becker, is known as one of the first curlers to represent New Zealand internationally. He was also the coach of the women's team as well as the Secretary of the New Zealand Curling Association. Becker's sister, Bridget has been the skip of the New Zealand women's national curling team. His wife, Cassie, made her international debut with the New Zealand women's team in 2008.

== Career highlights ==
- 2006 Torino Olympic Games opening and closing ceremony flag bearer for New Zealand

== Awards ==
- Colin Campbell Award 1999, 2004 and 2012
