= 2018 World Junior B Curling Championships =

- Host city: Lohja, Finland
- Arena: Kisakallio Sports Institute
- Dates: January 3–10
- Men's winner: China
- Skip: Wang Zhiyu
- Third: Tian Jiafeng
- Second: Wang Xiangkun
- Lead: Zhang Zezhong
- Alternate: Guan Tianqi
- Finalist: Russia (Aleksandr Bystrov)
- Women's winner: China
- Skip: Wang Zixin
- Fourth: Dong Ziqi
- Second: Wang Meini
- Lead: Sun Chengyu
- Alternate: Yu Jiaxin
- Finalist: Turkey (Dilşat Yıldız)

The 2018 World Junior B Curling Championships was held from January 3 to 10 at the Kisakallio Sports Institute in Lohja, Finland. The top three men’s and women’s teams at the World Junior B Curling Championships would qualify for the 2018 World Junior Curling Championships.

== Men ==
=== Round-robin standings ===
Final round-robin standings

Key
Teams to Playoffs
Teams to Qualification Game

Group A	Skip	W	L
Italy	Luca Rizzolli	5	1
Germany	Sixten Totzek	5	1
Spain	Gontzal Garcia	4	2
Finland	Melker Lundberg	3	3
France	Eddy Mercier	3	3
Slovenia	Stefan Sever	1	5
Australia	Mitchell Thomas	0	6

Group B	Skip	W	L
Japan	Kei Kamada	6	1
Hungary	Viktor Nagy	6	1
New Zealand	Simon Neilson	4	3
Turkey	Oğuzhan Karakurt	4	3
Netherlands	Olaf Bolkenbaas	4	3
Denmark	Henrik Holtermann	2	5
Poland	Krzysztof Swiatek	2	5
Kazakhstan	Joan Akhmad	0	7

Group C	Skip	W	L
Russia	Aleksandr Bystrov	6	1
China	Wang Zhiyu	6	1
Slovakia	Jakub Cervenka	4	3
Latvia	Kristaps Vilks	4	3
Hong Kong	Derek Leung	3	4
Czech Republic	Pavel Mareš	3	4
England	Jake Barker	2	5
Austria	Martin Seiwald	0	7

=== Qualification Game ===
Tuesday, January 9, 14:00

Team	1	2	3	4	5	6	7	8	Final
Spain (Garcia) 🔨	0	3	1	0	3	0	X	X	7
Slovakia (Cervenka)	0	0	0	1	0	1	X	X	2

=== Playoffs ===
Quarterfinals
1	Japan	3
8	Spain	7
4	China	9
5	Hungary	4
3	Italy	3
6	Germany	5
2	Russia	7
7	New Zealand	4

Semifinals
8	Spain	5
4	China	6
6	Germany	4
2	Russia	5

Gold-medal game
4	China	5
2	Russia	4

Bronze-medal game
8	Spain	4
6	Germany	6

==== Quarterfinals ====
Tuesday, January 9, 19:00

Team	1	2	3	4	5	6	7	8	Final
Japan (Kamada) 🔨	0	0	0	1	0	0	2	0	3
Spain (Garcia)	1	2	1	0	1	1	0	1	7

Team	1	2	3	4	5	6	7	8	Final
China (Wang) 🔨	4	0	2	0	2	1	X	X	9
Hungary (Nagy)	0	1	0	3	0	0	X	X	4

Team	1	2	3	4	5	6	7	8	Final
Italy (Rizzolli) 🔨	1	0	1	0	0	1	0	X	3
Germany (Totzek)	0	1	0	1	3	0	0	X	5

Team	1	2	3	4	5	6	7	8	Final
Russia (Bystrov)	0	3	0	0	2	2	0	X	7
New Zealand (Neilson) 🔨	1	0	1	0	0	0	2	X	4

==== Semifinals ====
Wednesday, January 10, 9:00

Team	1	2	3	4	5	6	7	8	9	Final
Spain (Garcia) 🔨	0	2	0	0	2	1	0	0	0	5
China (Wang)	1	0	1	1	0	0	1	1	1	6

Team	1	2	3	4	5	6	7	8	Final
Germany (Totzek)	0	0	1	0	2	0	1	0	4
Russia (Bystrov) 🔨	0	1	0	2	0	1	0	1	5

==== Bronze-medal game ====
Wednesday, January 10, 14:00

Team	1	2	3	4	5	6	7	8	Final
Spain (Garcia)	0	0	1	0	0	2	1	X	4
Germany (Totzek) 🔨	2	0	0	2	2	0	0	X	6

==== Gold-medal game ====
Wednesday, January 10, 14:00

Team	1	2	3	4	5	6	7	8	9	Final
China (Wang)	0	2	0	1	0	1	0	0	1	5
Russia (Bystrov) 🔨	1	0	1	0	0	0	1	1	0	4

== Women ==
=== Round-robin standings ===
Final round-robin standings

Key
Teams to Playoffs
Teams to Qualification Game

Group A	Skip	W	L
Norway	Maia Ramsfjell	6	0
Italy	Stefania Constantini	5	1
Hungary	Linda Joo	4	2
Czech Republic	Kristina Podrabska	3	3
England	Sarah Decoine	2	4
Romania	Iulia Ioana Traila	1	5
Australia	Tahli Gill	0	6

Group B	Skip	W	L
Turkey	Dilşat Yıldız	5	1
Latvia	Madara Bremane	4	2
Estonia	Triin Madisson	3	3
Poland	Daria Chmarra	3	3
Finland	Moa Norell	3	3
Slovenia	Nika Cerne	2	4
Spain	Alicia Munte	1	5

Group C	Skip	W	L
China	Wang Zixin	7	0
New Zealand	Jessica Smith	5	2
Germany	Mia Höhne	4	3
Japan	Yako Matsuzawa	4	3
Kazakhstan	Sitora Alliyarova	2	5
Slovakia	Silvia Sykorova	2	5
Austria	Celine Moser	2	5
Denmark	Jasmin Lander	2	5

=== Qualification Game ===
Tuesday, January 9, 9:00

Team	1	2	3	4	5	6	7	8	Final
Germany (Höhne) 🔨	2	1	1	3	0	2	X	X	9
Estonia (Madisson)	0	0	0	0	1	0	X	X	1

=== Playoffs ===
Quarterfinals
1	China	6
8	Germany	4
4	Italy	4
5	New Zealand	7
3	Norway	9
6	Latvia	3
2	Turkey	7
7	Hungary	5

Semifinals
1	China	4
5	New Zealand	1
3	Norway	2
2	Turkey	3

Gold-medal game
1	China	4
2	Turkey	2

Bronze-medal game
5	New Zealand	4
3	Norway	5

==== Quarterfinals ====
Tuesday, January 9, 14:00

Team	1	2	3	4	5	6	7	8	Final
China (Wang) 🔨	2	0	1	0	1	0	2	X	6
Germany (Höhne)	0	1	0	2	0	1	0	X	4

Team	1	2	3	4	5	6	7	8	Final
Italy (Constantini)	0	2	0	0	0	1	1	X	4
New Zealand (Smith) 🔨	3	0	0	1	3	0	0	X	7

Team	1	2	3	4	5	6	7	8	Final
Norway (Ramsfjell)	0	0	0	2	0	5	2	X	9
Latvia (Bremane) 🔨	0	1	0	0	2	0	0	X	3

Team	1	2	3	4	5	6	7	8	Final
Turkey (Yıldız)	3	1	1	0	0	2	0	X	7
Hungary (Joo) 🔨	0	0	0	2	2	0	1	X	5

==== Semifinals ====
Wednesday, January 10, 9:00

Team	1	2	3	4	5	6	7	8	Final
China (Wang) 🔨	0	0	2	0	0	1	1	X	4
New Zealand (Smith)	0	0	0	1	0	0	0	X	1

Team	1	2	3	4	5	6	7	8	Final
Norway (Ramsfjell) 🔨	0	0	0	0	2	0	0	0	2
Turkey (Yıldız)	1	1	0	0	0	0	0	1	3

==== Bronze-medal game ====
Wednesday, January 10, 14:00

Team	1	2	3	4	5	6	7	8	Final
New Zealand (Smith)	0	2	0	0	0	1	0	1	4
Norway (Ramsfjell) 🔨	1	0	1	1	2	0	0	0	5

==== Gold-medal game ====
Wednesday, January 10, 14:00

Team	1	2	3	4	5	6	7	8	Final
China (Wang) 🔨	1	0	0	2	0	0	0	1	4
Turkey (Yıldız)	0	1	0	0	1	0	0	0	2
