= Warren Dobson =

New Zealand curler

Warren Dobson (born 7 March 1980 in Ranfurly, New Zealand) is a curler who was on the team for New Zealand at the 2006 Winter Olympics. He was on the teams that won the 2003 and 2004 Pacific Curling Championships.
