= 2013 Karuizawa International Curling Championship =

- Host city: Karuizawa, Japan
- Arena: Karuizawa Ice Park
- Dates: April 18–21
- Men's winner: (South Korea) Team Kim
- Curling club: Uiseong CC, Uiseong
- Skip: Kim Chang-min
- Third: Kim Min-chan
- Second: Seong Se-hyun
- Lead: Seo Young-sun
- Alternate: Oh Eun-su
- Finalist: (Japan) Yusuke Morozumi
- Women's winner: (Switzerland) Team Feltscher-Beeli
- Curling club: Flims CC, Flims
- Skip: Binia Feltscher-Beeli
- Third: Irene Schori
- Second: Franziska Kaufmann
- Lead: Christine Urech
- Finalist: (Japan) Ayumi Ogasawara

The 2013 Karuizawa International Curling Championship was held from April 18 to 21 at the Karuizawa Ice Park in Karuizawa, Japan.

== Men ==
=== Teams ===
The teams are listed as follows:

Skip	Third	Second	Lead	Alternate	Locale
Shinya Abe	Yuta Matsumara	Naomasa Takeda	Hiroshi Sato	Yuki Hayashi	Sapporo, Japan
Peter de Boer	Sean Becker	Scott Becker	Kenny Thomson	Phil Dowling	Naseby, New Zealand
Minato Hayamizu	Hayato Matsumara	Gennya Nishizawa	Rui Sato	Tsukasa Horigome	Miyota, Japan
Arihito Kasahara	Akira Ohtosuka	Masaki Ishikawa	Hideyuki Sato		Kanagawa, Japan
Kim Chang-min	Kim Min-chan	Seong Se-hyun	Seo Young-sun	Oh Eun-su	Uiseong, South Korea
Tamotsu Matsumara	Yasuo Mochida	Yuki Sakamoto	Hayato Satoh		Karuizawa, Japan
Yusuke Morozumi	Tsuyoshi Yamaguchi	Tetsuro Shimizu	Kosuke Morozumi	Yoshiro Shimizu	Karuizawa, Japan
Hideaki Nakamura	Hitoshi Teratani	Tsutomu Kobayashi	Shinichiro Sakurai	Shinji Okamoto	Okayama, Japan
Yoshihiro Sakaguchi	Fukuhiro Ohno	Shunya Matsuda	Tomonori Konno		Obihiro, Japan
Tian Qiang	Zhang Zezhong	Kang Xinlong	Jiang Hanpu	Li Huaiyan	Harbin, China
Nagao Tsuchiya	Yamato Yoshiike	Yoshiaki Ogihara	Tatsuya Ooba	Tomohiro Yamaguchi	Karuizawa, Japan
Wang Binjiang	Wang Haicheng	Cao Yilun	Wang Zhiqiang	Chi Shuai	Harbin, China

=== Round robin standings ===
Final Round Robin Standings

Key
Teams to Playoffs
Teams to Tiebreakers

Pool A	W	L
(South Korea) Kim Chang-min	5	0
(Japan) Shinya Abe	4	1
(Japan) Tamotsu Matsumara	2	3
(Japan) Minato Hayamizu	2	3
(Japan) Arihito Kasahara	2	3
(China) Tian Qiang	0	5

Pool B	W	L
(Japan) Yusuke Morozumi	5	0
(New Zealand) Peter de Boer	4	1
(China) Wang Binjiang	2	3
(Japan) Yoshihiro Sakaguchi	2	3
(Japan) Nagao Tsuchiya	1	4
(Japan) Hideaki Nakamura	1	4

=== Round robin results ===
All draw times listed in Japan Standard Time (UTC+9).

==== Draw 1 ====
Thursday, April 18, 9:00

Sheet D	1	2	3	4	5	6	7	8	Final
(Japan) Minato Hayamizu	0	0	1	0	0	1	0	0	2
(Japan) Arihito Kasahara 🔨	1	0	0	1	0	0	0	1	3

Sheet E	1	2	3	4	5	6	7	8	Final
(South Korea) Kim Chang-min 🔨	2	0	2	1	0	4	X	X	9
(Japan) Tamotsu Matsumara	0	0	0	0	2	0	X	X	2

Sheet F	1	2	3	4	5	6	7	8	Final
(Japan) Shinya Abe 🔨	2	2	4	3	1	0	X	X	12
(China) Tian Qiang	0	0	0	0	0	1	X	X	1

==== Draw 2 ====
Thursday, April 18, 13:00

Sheet D	1	2	3	4	5	6	7	8	9	Final
(Japan) Yusuke Morozumi 🔨	0	1	0	0	1	0	2	0	1	5
(New Zealand) Peter de Boer	1	0	0	1	0	1	0	1	0	4

Sheet E	1	2	3	4	5	6	7	8	Final
(Japan) Hideaki Nakamura	0	0	1	0	2	1	0	1	5
(Japan) Nagao Tsuchiya 🔨	2	2	0	1	0	0	3	0	8

Sheet F	1	2	3	4	5	6	7	8	Final
(China) Wang Binjiang	0	0	1	2	0	1	0	X	4
(Japan) Yoshihiro Sakaguchi 🔨	0	2	0	0	3	0	4	X	9

==== Draw 3 ====
Thursday, April 18, 16:30

Sheet A	1	2	3	4	5	6	7	8	Final
(Japan) Minato Hayamizu 🔨	1	1	3	5	0	0	X	X	10
(China) Tian Qiang	0	0	0	0	1	1	X	X	2

Sheet B	1	2	3	4	5	6	7	8	Final
(South Korea) Kim Chang-min	1	0	2	3	0	1	0	X	7
(Japan) Shinya Abe 🔨	0	1	0	0	1	0	3	X	5

Sheet C	1	2	3	4	5	6	7	8	Final
(Japan) Tamotsu Matsumara 🔨	2	0	1	0	2	2	X	X	7
(Japan) Arihito Kasahara	0	1	0	0	0	0	X	X	1

==== Draw 4 ====
Thursday, April 18, 20:00

Sheet A	1	2	3	4	5	6	7	8	Final
(Japan) Yusuke Morozumi	0	2	0	1	1	1	2	X	7
(Japan) Yoshihiro Sakaguchi 🔨	3	0	1	0	0	0	0	X	4

Sheet B	1	2	3	4	5	6	7	8	Final
(Japan) Hideaki Nakamura	0	1	0	0	0	1	0	X	2
(China) Wang Binjiang 🔨	1	0	0	3	1	0	3	X	8

Sheet C	1	2	3	4	5	6	7	8	Final
(Japan) Nagao Tsuchiya	0	1	0	2	0	0	1	X	4
(New Zealand) Peter de Boer 🔨	2	0	2	0	1	1	0	X	6

==== Draw 5 ====
Friday, April 19, 9:00

Sheet D	1	2	3	4	5	6	7	8	Final
(Japan) Tamotsu Matsumara 🔨	2	0	0	1	0	1	0	X	4
(Japan) Shinya Abe	0	3	1	0	2	0	0	X	6

Sheet E	1	2	3	4	5	6	7	8	Final
(Japan) Arihito Kasahara	0	1	0	3	3	0	X	X	7
(China) Tian Qiang 🔨	1	0	1	0	0	1	X	X	3

Sheet F	1	2	3	4	5	6	7	8	Final
(Japan) Minato Hayamizu	0	0	2	1	0	0	0	0	3
(South Korea) Kim Chang-min 🔨	1	0	0	0	2	1	1	3	8

==== Draw 6 ====
Friday, April 19, 12:30

Sheet D	1	2	3	4	5	6	7	8	Final
(Japan) Nagao Tsuchiya	0	0	1	0	2	0	1	0	4
(China) Wang Binjiang 🔨	1	2	0	0	0	2	0	2	7

Sheet E	1	2	3	4	5	6	7	8	Final
(New Zealand) Peter de Boer 🔨	2	1	3	0	1	1	X	X	8
(Japan) Yoshihiro Sakaguchi	0	0	0	1	0	0	X	X	1

Sheet F	1	2	3	4	5	6	7	8	Final
(Japan) Yusuke Morozumi	2	0	1	3	2	2	X	X	10
(Japan) Hideaki Nakamura 🔨	0	0	0	0	0	0	X	X	0

==== Draw 7 ====
Friday, April 19, 16:00

Sheet A	1	2	3	4	5	6	7	8	Final
(Japan) Arihito Kasahara	0	0	0	0	1	1	0	X	2
(Japan) Shinya Abe 🔨	0	0	1	2	0	0	3	X	6

Sheet B	1	2	3	4	5	6	7	8	Final
(Japan) Tamotsu Matsumara	0	0	2	0	5	0	0	0	7
(Japan) Minato Hayamizu 🔨	1	3	0	1	0	2	0	1	8

Sheet C	1	2	3	4	5	6	7	8	Final
(China) Tian Qiang	2	0	0	0	0	1	X	X	1
(South Korea) Kim Chang-min 🔨	0	1	2	1	3	0	X	X	7

==== Draw 8 ====
Friday, April 19, 19:30

Sheet A	1	2	3	4	5	6	7	8	Final
(New Zealand) Peter de Boer	1	0	0	2	0	0	2	X	5
(China) Wang Binjiang 🔨	0	1	0	0	0	2	0	X	3

Sheet B	1	2	3	4	5	6	7	8	Final
(Japan) Nagao Tsuchiya	0	0	0	0	0	1	X	X	1
(Japan) Yusuke Morozumi 🔨	3	4	2	3	2	0	X	X	14

Sheet C	1	2	3	4	5	6	7	8	9	Final
(Japan) Yoshihiro Sakaguchi	1	0	0	0	2	0	0	0	0	3
(Japan) Hideaki Nakamura 🔨	0	1	0	0	0	1	0	1	1	4

==== Draw 9 ====
Saturday, April 19, 9:00

Sheet A	1	2	3	4	5	6	7	8	Final
(China) Tian Qiang	0	0	1	1	0	0	0	X	2
(Japan) Tamotsu Matsumara 🔨	2	2	0	0	2	0	1	X	7

Sheet B	1	2	3	4	5	6	7	8	Final
(Japan) Arihito Kasahara	0	0	0	2	0	0	X	X	2
(South Korea) Kim Chang-min 🔨	4	2	1	0	4	4	X	X	15

Sheet C	1	2	3	4	5	6	7	8	Final
(Japan) Shinya Abe	2	1	0	0	2	3	0	X	8
(Japan) Minato Hayamizu 🔨	0	0	2	2	0	0	1	X	5

==== Draw 10 ====
Saturday, April 19, 12:30

Sheet A	1	2	3	4	5	6	7	8	9	Final
(Japan) Yoshihiro Sakaguchi	0	0	0	2	0	1	0	3	1	7
(Japan) Nagao Tsuchiya 🔨	2	0	0	0	2	0	2	0	0	6

Sheet B	1	2	3	4	5	6	7	8	Final
(New Zealand) Peter de Boer 🔨	4	0	0	3	1	0	1	X	9
(Japan) Hideaki Nakamura	0	2	0	0	0	1	0	X	3

Sheet C	1	2	3	4	5	6	7	8	Final
(China) Wang Binjiang	0	2	0	0	0	0	0	X	2
(Japan) Yusuke Morozumi 🔨	1	0	1	2	1	1	1	X	7

=== Tiebreakers ===
==== Round 1 ====
Saturday, April 20, 15:30

Sheet D	Final
(Japan) Minato Hayamizu 🔨	W
(Japan) Arihito Kasahara	L

Team	Final
(China) Wang Binjiang	W
(Japan) Yoshihiro Sakaguchi 🔨	L

==== Round 2 ====
Saturday, April 20, 17:30

Team	Final
(Japan) Tamotsu Matsumara 🔨	L
(Japan) Minato Hayamizu	W

=== Playoffs ===
Quarterfinals
B2	(New Zealand) Peter de Boer	7
A3	(Japan) Minato Hayamizu	2
A2	(Japan) Shinya Abe	8
B3	(China) Wang Binjiang	1

Semifinals
A1	(South Korea) Kim Chang-min	7
B2	(New Zealand) Peter de Boer	6
B1	(Japan) Yusuke Morozumi	6
A2	(Japan) Shinya Abe	4

Final
A1	(South Korea) Kim Chang-min	6
B1	(Japan) Yusuke Morozumi	3
Third place game
B2	(New Zealand) Peter de Boer	4
A2	(Japan) Shinya Abe	6

==== Quarterfinals ====
Saturday, April 20, 19:30

Sheet A	1	2	3	4	5	6	7	8	Final
(Japan) Shinya Abe 🔨	3	1	0	2	1	1	X	X	8
(China) Wang Binjiang	0	0	1	0	0	0	X	X	1

Sheet B	1	2	3	4	5	6	7	8	Final
(New Zealand) Peter de Boer 🔨	2	0	3	0	1	1	X	X	7
(Japan) Minato Hayamizu	0	1	0	1	0	0	X	X	2

==== Semifinals ====
Sunday, April 21, 9:00

Sheet C	1	2	3	4	5	6	7	8	9	Final
(South Korea) Kim Chang-min 🔨	1	0	0	0	2	0	3	0	1	7
(New Zealand) Peter de Boer	0	2	1	0	0	2	0	1	0	6

Sheet F	1	2	3	4	5	6	7	8	Final
(Japan) Yusuke Morozumi	0	3	0	1	0	1	1	X	6
(Japan) Shinya Abe 🔨	2	0	1	0	1	0	0	X	4

==== Third place game ====
Sunday, April 21, 15:00

Sheet C	1	2	3	4	5	6	7	8	Final
(New Zealand) Peter de Boer 🔨	0	2	0	0	1	0	1	0	4
(Japan) Shinya Abe	0	0	2	2	0	1	0	1	6

==== Final ====
Sunday, April 21, 15:00

Sheet D	1	2	3	4	5	6	7	8	Final
(South Korea) Kim Chang-min 🔨	1	0	0	0	2	2	1	X	6
(Japan) Yusuke Morozumi	0	0	1	2	0	0	0	X	3

== Women ==
=== Teams ===
The teams are listed as follows:

Skip	Third	Second	Lead	Alternate	Locale
Binia Feltscher-Beeli	Irene Schori	Franziska Kaufmann	Christine Urech		Flims, Switzerland
Satsuki Fujisawa	Miyo Ichikawa	Emi Shimizu	Chiaki Matsumura	Miyuki Satoh	Karuizawa, Japan
Kim Eun-jung	Kim Kyeong-ae	Kim Seon-yeong	Kim Yeong-mi	Kim Min-jung	Uiseong, South Korea
Kim Ji-sun	Lee Seul-bee	Um Min-ji	Gim Un-chi		Gyeonggido, South Korea
Tori Koana	Junko Sonobe	Midori Hachimaru	Riko Toyoda	Yuji Nishimuro	Yamanashi, Japan
Liu Qianqian	Zhang Yuenan	Zhang Shiwei	Wu Wenjiaze	He Jiaxin	Harbin, China
Ayumi Ogasawara	Yumie Funayama	Kaho Onodera	Chinami Yoshida	Michiko Tomabechi	Sapporo, Japan
Kai Tsuchiya	Misaki Kobayashi	Erika Otani	Mina Uchibori	Kie Igarashi	Miyota, Japan
Shoko Watanabe	Shiori Fujisawa	Fumi Ohkubo	Noriko Ishimura	Aiko Iwasaki	Tokyo, Japan
Sayaka Yoshimura	Rina Ida	Risa Ujihara	Mao Ishigaki	Natsuko Ishiyama	Sapporo, Japan

=== Round robin standings ===
Final Round Robin Standings

Key
Teams to Playoffs

Pool A	W	L
(Japan) Sayaka Yoshimura	4	0
(Japan) Satsuki Fujisawa	3	1
(Japan) Tori Koana	2	2
(South Korea) Kim Ji-sun	1	3
(China) Liu Qianqian	0	4

Pool B	W	L
(Switzerland) Binia Feltscher-Beeli	3	1
(Japan) Ayumi Ogasawara	3	1
(South Korea) Kim Eun-jung	3	1
(Japan) Kai Tsuchiya	1	3
(Japan) Shoko Watanabe	0	4

=== Round robin results ===
All draw times listed in Japan Standard Time (UTC+9).

==== Draw 1 ====
Thursday, April 18, 9:00

Sheet B	1	2	3	4	5	6	7	8	Final
(Japan) Satsuki Fujisawa	0	1	0	2	0	1	0	3	7
(Japan) Tori Koana 🔨	1	0	1	0	2	0	1	0	5

Sheet C	1	2	3	4	5	6	7	8	Final
(China) Liu Qianqian	0	0	1	0	0	0	X	X	1
(Japan) Sayaka Yoshimura 🔨	4	1	0	4	3	1	X	X	13

==== Draw 2 ====
Thursday, April 18, 13:00

Sheet B	1	2	3	4	5	6	7	8	Final
(Japan) Shoko Watanabe 🔨	1	1	0	0	0	1	0	X	3
(South Korea) Kim Eun-jung	0	0	3	3	1	0	2	X	9

Sheet C	1	2	3	4	5	6	7	8	Final
(Japan) Kai Tsuchiya 🔨	0	0	2	0	0	0	1	X	3
(Japan) Ayumi Ogasawara	0	2	0	1	1	3	0	X	7

==== Draw 3 ====
Thursday, April 18, 16:30

Sheet D	1	2	3	4	5	6	7	8	Final
(South Korea) Kim Ji-sun	0	1	1	0	2	0	3	0	7
(Japan) Tori Koana 🔨	2	0	0	1	0	3	0	2	8

Sheet E	1	2	3	4	5	6	7	8	Final
(China) Liu Qianqian	0	0	0	0	0	1	X	X	1
(Japan) Satsuki Fujisawa 🔨	2	3	5	1	1	0	X	X	12

==== Draw 4 ====
Thursday, April 18, 20:00

Sheet D	1	2	3	4	5	6	7	8	Final
(Switzerland) Binia Feltscher-Beeli	0	1	1	0	0	1	0	1	4
(South Korea) Kim Eun-jung 🔨	0	0	0	2	0	0	1	0	3

Sheet E	1	2	3	4	5	6	7	8	Final
(Japan) Kai Tsuchiya 🔨	2	0	1	0	4	0	2	X	9
(Japan) Shoko Watanabe	0	1	0	1	0	1	0	X	3

==== Draw 5 ====
Friday, April 19, 9:00

Sheet B	1	2	3	4	5	6	7	8	9	Final
(Japan) Sayaka Yoshimura 🔨	1	1	0	1	0	0	2	0	1	6
(Japan) Satsuki Fujisawa	0	0	2	0	0	2	0	1	0	5

Sheet C	1	2	3	4	5	6	7	8	Final
(South Korea) Kim Ji-sun	2	0	5	0	7	X	X	X	14
(China) Liu Qianqian	0	1	0	1	0	X	X	X	2

==== Draw 6 ====
Friday, April 19, 12:30

Sheet B	1	2	3	4	5	6	7	8	Final
(Japan) Ayumi Ogasawara	2	0	2	0	2	0	2	X	8
(Japan) Shoko Watanabe 🔨	0	2	0	1	0	2	0	X	5

Sheet C	1	2	3	4	5	6	7	8	Final
(Switzerland) Binia Feltscher-Beeli 🔨	1	1	0	2	0	0	2	X	6
(Japan) Kai Tsuchiya	0	0	2	0	1	0	0	X	3

==== Draw 7 ====
Friday, April 19, 16:00

Sheet D	1	2	3	4	5	6	7	8	Final
(Japan) Tori Koana	1	3	3	4	0	1	X	X	12
(China) Liu Qianqian 🔨	0	0	0	0	1	0	X	X	1

Sheet E	1	2	3	4	5	6	7	8	Final
(Japan) Sayaka Yoshimura 🔨	1	0	0	2	0	1	0	2	6
(South Korea) Kim Ji-sun	0	0	1	0	1	0	2	0	4

==== Draw 8 ====
Friday, April 19, 19:30

Sheet D	1	2	3	4	5	6	7	8	Final
(South Korea) Kim Eun-jung	3	0	0	2	0	1	1	1	8
(Japan) Kai Tsuchiya 🔨	0	1	1	0	2	0	0	0	4

Sheet E	1	2	3	4	5	6	7	8	Final
(Japan) Ayumi Ogasawara	0	3	0	0	1	3	X	X	7
(Switzerland) Binia Feltscher-Beeli 🔨	0	0	0	0	0	0	X	X	0

==== Draw 9 ====
Saturday, April 19, 9:00

Sheet D	1	2	3	4	5	6	7	8	Final
(Japan) Satsuki Fujisawa 🔨	1	1	0	3	4	0	X	X	9
(South Korea) Kim Ji-sun	0	0	1	0	0	2	X	X	3

Sheet E	1	2	3	4	5	6	7	8	Final
(Japan) Tori Koana	0	0	5	0	1	0	1	0	7
(Japan) Sayaka Yoshimura 🔨	0	2	0	3	0	1	0	2	8

==== Draw 10 ====
Saturday, April 19, 12:30

Sheet D	1	2	3	4	5	6	7	8	Final
(Japan) Shoko Watanabe	0	0	0	1	0	0	0	X	1
(Switzerland) Binia Feltscher-Beeli 🔨	1	1	3	0	2	0	3	X	10

Sheet E	1	2	3	4	5	6	7	8	Final
(South Korea) Kim Eun-jung	3	0	2	3	0	3	X	X	11
(Japan) Ayumi Ogasawara 🔨	0	1	0	0	2	0	X	X	3

=== Playoffs ===
Quarterfinals
B2	(Japan) Ayumi Ogasawara	3
A3	(Japan) Tori Koana	2
A2	(Japan) Satsuki Fujisawa	3
B3	(South Korea) Kim Eun-jung	8

Semifinals
A1	(Japan) Sayaka Yoshimura	1
B2	(Japan) Ayumi Ogasawara	7
B1	(Switzerland) Binia Feltscher-Beeli	6
B3	(South Korea) Kim Eun-jung	1

Final
B2	(Japan) Ayumi Ogasawara	3
B1	(Switzerland) Binia Feltscher-Beeli	6
Third place game
A1	(Japan) Sayaka Yoshimura	7
B3	(South Korea) Kim Eun-jung	6

==== Quarterfinals ====
Saturday, April 20, 19:30

Sheet C	1	2	3	4	5	6	7	8	Final
(Japan) Ayumi Ogasawara 🔨	0	0	0	1	1	0	0	1	3
(Japan) Tori Koana	0	0	1	0	0	0	1	0	2

Sheet F	1	2	3	4	5	6	7	8	Final
(Japan) Satsuki Fujisawa	0	1	0	1	0	1	X	X	3
(South Korea) Kim Eun-jung 🔨	3	0	1	0	4	0	X	X	8

==== Semifinals ====
Sunday, April 21, 9:00

Sheet A	1	2	3	4	5	6	7	8	Final
(Japan) Sayaka Yoshimura	0	0	1	0	0	0	X	X	1
(Japan) Ayumi Ogasawara 🔨	3	1	0	1	1	1	X	X	7

Sheet B	1	2	3	4	5	6	7	8	Final
(Switzerland) Binia Feltscher-Beeli 🔨	0	0	0	4	0	2	X	X	6
(South Korea) Kim Eun-jung	0	0	0	0	1	0	X	X	1

==== Third place game ====
Sunday, April 21, 12:00

Sheet C	1	2	3	4	5	6	7	8	Final
(Japan) Sayaka Yoshimura	0	4	0	0	1	0	1	1	7
(South Korea) Kim Eun-jung 🔨	2	0	1	2	0	1	0	0	6

==== Final ====
Sunday, April 21, 12:00

Sheet D	1	2	3	4	5	6	7	8	Final
(Japan) Ayumi Ogasawara	0	0	1	0	0	2	0	X	3
(Switzerland) Binia Feltscher-Beeli 🔨	0	3	0	1	1	0	1	X	6
