= 2013 The Masters Grand Slam of Curling =

Grand Slam of Curling event

- Host city: Abbotsford, British Columbia
- Arena: Abbotsford Entertainment & Sports Centre
- Dates: October 29 – November 3
- Men's winner: (Ontario) Glenn Howard
- Curling club: Penetanguishene CC, Penetanguishene, Ontario
- Skip: Glenn Howard
- Third: Wayne Middaugh
- Second: Brent Laing
- Lead: Craig Savill
- Finalist: (Alberta) Kevin Martin
- Women's winner: (Ontario) Rachel Homan
- Curling club: Ottawa CC, Ottawa
- Skip: Rachel Homan
- Third: Emma Miskew
- Second: Alison Kreviazuk
- Lead: Lisa Weagle
- Finalist: (Scotland) Eve Muirhead

The 2013 Masters Grand Slam of Curling was held from October 29 to November 3 at the Abbotsford Entertainment & Sports Centre in Abbotsford, British Columbia as part of the 2013–14 World Curling Tour. The Masters was the first Grand Slam on the men's tour and the third Grand Slam on the women's tour. The purses for both the men's and the women's events were CAD$100,000 each.

The event featured the six men's and six women's teams that have qualified for the 2013 Canadian Olympic Curling Trials as well as teams representing most of the nations that have already qualified for the curling at the 2014 Winter Olympics, along with some nations that are attempting to qualify. Out of the 16 men's and women's teams that have already qualified for the Olympics, only Denmark failed to send a team in the women's event. Out of the teams that have not yet qualified for the Olympics, the United States and New Zealand sent men's teams, and China, Latvia and Japan sent women's teams.

== Men ==
The teams are listed as follows:

=== Teams ===
Skip	Third	Second	Lead	Locale
Peter de Boer	Sean Becker	Scott Becker	Kenny Thomson	Naseby, New Zealand
Evgeniy Arkhipov (fourth)	Alexey Stukalskiy	Andrey Drozdov (skip)	Petr Dron	Moscow, Russia
Niklas Edin	Sebastian Kraupp	Fredrik Lindberg	Viktor Kjäll	Karlstad, Sweden
John Epping	Scott Bailey	Collin Mitchell	David Mathers	Toronto, Ontario
Christopher Plys (fourth)	Tyler George (skip)	Rich Ruohonen	Colin Hufman	(United States) Duluth, Minnesota
Glenn Howard	Wayne Middaugh	Brent Laing	Craig Savill	Penetanguishene, Ontario
Kevin Koe	Pat Simmons	Carter Rycroft	Nolan Thiessen	Calgary, Alberta
Liu Rui	Zang Jialiang	Xu Xiaoming	Ba Dexin	Harbin, China
Kevin Martin	David Nedohin	Marc Kennedy	Ben Hebert	Edmonton, Alberta
Mike McEwen	B. J. Neufeld	Matt Wozniak	Denni Neufeld	Winnipeg, Manitoba
Sven Michel	Claudio Pätz	Sandro Trolliet	Simon Gempeler	Adelboden, Switzerland
David Murdoch	Tom Brewster	Scott Andrews	Michael Goodfellow	Stirling, Scotland
Rasmus Stjerne	Johnny Frederiksen	Mikkel Poulsen	Troels Harry	Hvidovre, Denmark
Jeff Stoughton	Jon Mead	Reid Carruthers	Mark Nichols	Winnipeg, Manitoba
Thomas Ulsrud	Torger Nergård	Christoffer Svae	Markus Høiberg	Oslo, Norway

=== Round Robin Standings ===
Final Round Robin Standings

Key
Teams to Playoffs
Teams to Tiebreakers

Pool A	W	L
(China) Liu Rui	3	1
(Alberta) Kevin Martin	3	1
(Manitoba) Jeff Stoughton	3	1
(Norway) Thomas Ulsrud	1	3
(United States) Tyler George	0	4

Pool B	W	L
(Ontario) Glenn Howard	4	0
(Scotland) David Murdoch	3	1
(Switzerland) Sven Michel	2	2
(Manitoba) Mike McEwen	1	3
(Russia) Andrey Drozdov	0	4

Pool C	W	L
(Denmark) Rasmus Stjerne	3	1
(Sweden) Niklas Edin	2	2
(Alberta) Kevin Koe	2	2
(Ontario) John Epping	2	2
(New Zealand) Peter de Boer	1	3

=== Round Robin Results ===
All draw times are listed in Pacific Daylight Time (UTC−7).

==== Draw 1 ====
Tuesday, October 29, 7:00 pm

Sheet A	1	2	3	4	5	6	7	8	9	Final
(Alberta) Kevin Martin	0	2	0	1	0	2	0	1	0	6
(China) Liu Rui 🔨	1	0	2	0	2	0	1	0	1	7

Sheet C	1	2	3	4	5	6	7	8	Final
(Manitoba) Mike McEwen 🔨	0	0	0	1	0	1	1	1	4
(Scotland) David Murdoch	1	2	1	0	1	0	0	0	5

==== Draw 2 ====
Wednesday, October 30, 9:00 am

Sheet B	1	2	3	4	5	6	7	8	Final
(New Zealand) Peter de Boer 🔨	1	0	1	0	0	0	1	X	3
(Ontario) John Epping	0	1	0	1	4	0	0	X	6

Sheet D	1	2	3	4	5	6	7	8	9	Final
(Norway) Thomas Ulsrud 🔨	2	0	1	0	0	1	0	1	2	7
(United States) Tyler George	0	4	0	0	0	0	1	0	0	5

Sheet E	1	2	3	4	5	6	7	8	Final
(Switzerland) Sven Michel 🔨	3	0	3	0	0	2	X	X	8
(Russia) Andrey Drozdov	0	1	0	1	1	0	X	X	3

==== Draw 3 ====
Wednesday, October 30, 12:30 pm

Sheet B	1	2	3	4	5	6	7	8	Final
(Manitoba) Jeff Stoughton 🔨	1	0	1	0	2	2	0	X	6
(China) Liu Rui	0	1	0	1	0	0	1	X	3

Sheet C	1	2	3	4	5	6	7	8	Final
(Sweden) Niklas Edin 🔨	2	0	0	1	0	0	0	1	4
(Denmark) Rasmus Stjerne	0	2	0	0	1	2	1	0	6

Sheet E	1	2	3	4	5	6	7	8	9	Final
(Ontario) Glenn Howard	0	0	2	1	0	0	0	2	1	6
(Scotland) David Murdoch 🔨	2	0	0	0	0	2	1	0	0	5

==== Draw 4 ====
Wednesday, October 30, 4:30 pm

Sheet A	1	2	3	4	5	6	7	8	Final
(Manitoba) Mike McEwen	0	1	0	1	1	0	0	X	3
(Switzerland) Sven Michel 🔨	2	0	1	0	0	2	2	X	7

Sheet E	1	2	3	4	5	6	7	8	Final
(Alberta) Kevin Koe 🔨	2	1	0	0	1	0	1	X	5
(New Zealand) Peter de Boer	0	0	1	0	0	1	0	X	2

==== Draw 5 ====
Wednesday, October 30, 7:30 pm

Sheet A	1	2	3	4	5	6	7	8	Final
(Ontario) John Epping	0	2	0	3	0	2	0	0	7
(Denmark) Rasmus Stjerne 🔨	1	0	4	0	2	0	0	1	8

Sheet B	1	2	3	4	5	6	7	8	Final
(Alberta) Kevin Martin 🔨	0	3	0	1	0	1	0	1	6
(Norway) Thomas Ulsrud	0	0	1	0	1	0	2	0	4

Sheet D	1	2	3	4	5	6	7	8	Final
(Ontario) Glenn Howard 🔨	2	1	0	0	0	1	0	1	5
(Russia) Andrey Drozdov	0	0	1	0	0	0	2	0	3

==== Draw 6 ====
Thursday, October 31, 9:00 am

Sheet A	1	2	3	4	5	6	7	8	Final
(Alberta) Kevin Koe	0	0	3	0	3	0	2	2	10
(Denmark) Rasmus Stjerne 🔨	0	4	0	1	0	2	0	0	7

Sheet C	1	2	3	4	5	6	7	8	Final
(Manitoba) Jeff Stoughton	0	3	0	0	2	0	2	X	7
(Norway) Thomas Ulsrud 🔨	2	0	1	1	0	1	0	X	5

Sheet D	1	2	3	4	5	6	7	8	9	Final
(Ontario) John Epping	0	0	1	1	0	1	0	2	0	5
(Sweden) Niklas Edin 🔨	2	1	0	0	1	0	1	0	2	7

==== Draw 7 ====
Thursday, October 31, 12:30 pm

Sheet D	1	2	3	4	5	6	7	8	Final
(China) Liu Rui 🔨	1	0	1	3	0	0	2	X	7
(United States) Tyler George	0	2	0	0	0	2	0	X	4

==== Draw 8 ====
Thursday, October 31, 4:30 pm

Sheet B	1	2	3	4	5	6	7	8	Final
(Alberta) Kevin Koe 🔨	1	0	0	1	0	1	0	1	4
(Ontario) John Epping	0	0	3	0	1	0	2	0	6

Sheet C	1	2	3	4	5	6	7	8	Final
(Ontario) Glenn Howard 🔨	0	0	0	1	1	0	3	X	5
(Manitoba) Mike McEwen	0	0	1	0	0	1	0	X	2

Sheet D	1	2	3	4	5	6	7	8	Final
(Alberta) Kevin Martin	1	0	1	0	2	1	0	2	7
(Manitoba) Jeff Stoughton 🔨	0	2	0	4	0	0	0	0	6

==== Draw 9 ====
Thursday, October 31, 7:30 pm

Sheet A	1	2	3	4	5	6	7	8	Final
(Scotland) David Murdoch 🔨	0	2	1	0	1	0	0	2	6
(Switzerland) Sven Michel	1	0	0	2	0	2	0	0	5

Sheet D	1	2	3	4	5	6	7	8	Final
(Denmark) Rasmus Stjerne	0	2	0	1	1	0	0	1	5
(New Zealand) Peter de Boer 🔨	1	0	1	0	0	1	0	0	3

==== Draw 10 ====
Friday, November 1, 9:00 am

Sheet A	1	2	3	4	5	6	7	8	Final
(Sweden) Niklas Edin 🔨	1	0	1	0	2	0	1	0	5
(New Zealand) Peter de Boer	0	1	0	1	0	3	0	1	6

Sheet B	1	2	3	4	5	6	7	8	Final
(Manitoba) Mike McEwen	0	0	3	1	0	2	0	0	6
(Russia) Andrey Drozdov 🔨	2	1	0	0	1	0	1	0	5

Sheet C	1	2	3	4	5	6	7	8	Final
(Alberta) Kevin Martin 🔨	0	2	0	2	0	0	2	X	6
(United States) Tyler George	0	0	1	0	0	1	0	X	2

Sheet E	1	2	3	4	5	6	7	8	9	Final
(Ontario) Glenn Howard 🔨	1	0	1	0	2	0	2	0	1	7
(Switzerland) Sven Michel	0	1	0	3	0	1	0	1	0	6

==== Draw 11 ====
Friday, November 1, 12:30 pm

Sheet E	1	2	3	4	5	6	7	8	Final
(Norway) Thomas Ulsrud 🔨	1	0	0	0	1	0	1	X	3
(China) Liu Rui	0	2	1	1	0	3	0	X	7

==== Draw 12 ====
Friday, November 1, 4:30 pm

Sheet B	1	2	3	4	5	6	7	8	Final
(Manitoba) Jeff Stoughton	2	0	0	0	0	3	1	X	6
(United States) Tyler George 🔨	0	1	0	1	0	0	0	X	2

Sheet C	1	2	3	4	5	6	7	8	Final
(Alberta) Kevin Koe	0	0	1	0	1	0	0	X	2
(Sweden) Niklas Edin 🔨	1	1	0	3	0	1	2	X	8

Sheet E	1	2	3	4	5	6	7	8	Final
(Scotland) David Murdoch 🔨	2	0	2	1	2	X	X	X	7
(Russia) Andrey Drozdov	0	1	0	0	0	X	X	X	1

=== Tiebreakers ===
Friday, November 1, 7:30 pm

Team	1	2	3	4	5	6	7	8	Final
(Alberta) Kevin Koe	1	0	0	1	0	0	3	X	5
(Ontario) John Epping 🔨	0	0	1	0	1	1	0	X	3

Team	1	2	3	4	5	6	7	8	Final
(Sweden) Niklas Edin 🔨	2	0	1	0	1	0	2	X	6
(Switzerland) Sven Michel	0	1	0	0	0	1	0	X	2

=== Playoffs ===
The playoffs draw is listed as follows:

Quarterfinals
(Ontario) Glenn Howard	8
(Sweden) Niklas Edin	4
(Scotland) David Murdoch	4
(Manitoba) Jeff Stoughton	6
(Alberta) Kevin Martin	6
(Alberta) Kevin Koe	3
(Denmark) Rasmus Stjerne	3
(China) Liu Rui	6

Semifinals
(Ontario) Glenn Howard	4
(Manitoba) Jeff Stoughton	3
(Alberta) Kevin Martin	4
(China) Liu Rui	2

Final
(Ontario) Glenn Howard	7
(Alberta) Kevin Martin	4

==== Quarterfinals ====
Saturday, November 2, 9:00 am

Team	1	2	3	4	5	6	7	8	Final
(Ontario) Glenn Howard 🔨	1	0	2	0	3	0	2	X	8
(Sweden) Niklas Edin	0	2	0	1	0	1	0	X	4

Team	1	2	3	4	5	6	7	8	Final
(Scotland) David Murdoch	0	1	0	1	0	1	0	1	4
(Manitoba) Jeff Stoughton 🔨	1	0	1	0	2	0	2	0	6

Team	1	2	3	4	5	6	7	8	Final
(Alberta) Kevin Martin 🔨	1	1	1	0	0	3	0	X	6
(Alberta) Kevin Koe	0	0	0	2	0	0	1	X	3

Team	1	2	3	4	5	6	7	8	Final
(Denmark) Rasmus Stjerne	0	0	0	1	1	0	1	X	3
(China) Liu Rui 🔨	0	2	3	0	0	1	0	X	6

==== Semifinals ====
Saturday, November 2, 4:00 pm

Team	1	2	3	4	5	6	7	8	9	Final
(Ontario) Glenn Howard 🔨	0	1	1	0	0	1	0	0	1	4
(Manitoba) Jeff Stoughton	0	0	0	1	0	0	1	1	0	3

Team	1	2	3	4	5	6	7	8	Final
(Alberta) Kevin Martin	1	0	0	0	2	0	1	X	4
(China) Liu Rui 🔨	0	0	0	2	0	0	0	X	2

==== Final ====
Sunday, November 3, 10:00 am

Team	1	2	3	4	5	6	7	8	Final
(Ontario) Glenn Howard 🔨	0	0	2	0	4	0	1	X	7
(Alberta) Kevin Martin	1	0	0	1	0	2	0	X	4

Player percentages
(Ontario) Glenn Howard		(Alberta) Kevin Martin	
Craig Savill	85%	Ben Hebert	85%
Brent Laing	86%	Marc Kennedy	91%
Wayne Middaugh	96%	David Nedohin	86%
Glenn Howard	87%	Kevin Martin	92%
Total	89%	Total	88%

== Women ==
=== Teams ===
The teams are listed as follows:

Skip	Third	Second	Lead	Locale
Erika Brown	Debbie McCormick	Jessica Schultz	Ann Swisshelm	(United States) Madison, Wisconsin
Chelsea Carey	Kristy McDonald	Kristen Foster	Lindsay Titheridge	Winnipeg, Manitoba
Satsuki Fujisawa	Miyo Ichikawa	Emi Shimizu	Miyuki Satoh	Karuizawa, Japan
Rachel Homan	Emma Miskew	Alison Kreviazuk	Lisa Weagle	Ottawa, Ontario
Jennifer Jones	Kaitlyn Lawes	Jill Officer	Dawn McEwen	Winnipeg, Manitoba
Kim Ji-sun	Gim Un-chi	Shin Mi-sung	Lee Seul-bee	Gyeonggi-do, South Korea
Stefanie Lawton	Sherry Anderson	Sherri Singler	Marliese Kasner	Saskatoon, Saskatchewan
Sherry Middaugh	Jo-Ann Rizzo	Lee Merklinger	Leigh Armstrong	Coldwater, Ontario
Eve Muirhead	Anna Sloan	Vicki Adams	Claire Hamilton	Stirling, Scotland
Heather Nedohin	Beth Iskiw	Jessica Mair	Laine Peters	Edmonton, Alberta
Mirjam Ott	Carmen Schäfer	Carmen Küng	Janine Greiner	Davos, Switzerland
Evita Regža	Dace Regža	Ieva Bērziņa	Žaklīna Litauniece	Jelgava, Latvia
Anna Sidorova	Margarita Fomina	Aleksandra Saitova	Ekaterina Galkina	Moscow, Russia
Maria Prytz (fourth)	Christina Bertrup	Maria Wennerström	Margaretha Sigfridsson (skip)	Härnösand, Sweden
Wang Bingyu	Liu Yin	Yue Qingshuang	Zhou Yan	Harbin, China

=== Round Robin Standings ===
Final Round Robin Standings

Key
Teams to Playoffs

Pool A	W	L
(Sweden) Margaretha Sigfridsson	4	0
(Alberta) Heather Nedohin	3	1
(Ontario) Rachel Homan	2	2
(China) Wang Bingyu	1	3
(Japan) Satsuki Fujisawa	0	4

Pool B	W	L
(Manitoba) Jennifer Jones	3	1
(South Korea) Kim Ji-sun	3	1
(Manitoba) Chelsea Carey	2	2
(Russia) Anna Sidorova	2	2
(United States) Erika Brown	0	4

Pool C	W	L
(Switzerland) Mirjam Ott	3	1
(Saskatchewan) Stefanie Lawton	3	1
(Scotland) Eve Muirhead	2	2
(Ontario) Sherry Middaugh	2	2
(Latvia) Evita Regža	0	4

=== Round Robin Results ===
All draw times are listed in Pacific Daylight Time (UTC−7).

==== Draw 1 ====
Tuesday, October 29, 7:00 pm

Sheet B	1	2	3	4	5	6	7	8	9	Final
(Alberta) Heather Nedohin 🔨	3	0	0	0	0	0	0	1	0	4
(Sweden) Margaretha Sigfridsson	0	0	2	0	0	1	1	0	1	5

Sheet D	1	2	3	4	5	6	7	8	Final
(Manitoba) Jennifer Jones 🔨	2	0	0	2	1	0	6	X	11
(South Korea) Kim Ji-sun	0	1	2	0	0	2	0	X	5

Sheet E	1	2	3	4	5	6	7	8	9	Final
(Switzerland) Mirjam Ott 🔨	0	2	0	1	0	3	0	0	1	7
(Scotland) Eve Muirhead	0	0	2	0	1	0	2	1	0	6

==== Draw 2 ====
Wednesday, October 30, 9:00 am

Sheet A	1	2	3	4	5	6	7	8	Final
(China) Wang Bingyu 🔨	6	2	0	2	1	X	X	X	11
(Japan) Satsuki Fujisawa	0	0	1	0	0	X	X	X	1

Sheet C	1	2	3	4	5	6	7	8	Final
(Ontario) Sherry Middaugh 🔨	0	2	0	0	3	1	0	X	6
(Latvia) Evita Regža	0	0	1	0	0	0	2	X	3

==== Draw 3 ====
Wednesday, October 30, 12:30 pm

Sheet A	1	2	3	4	5	6	7	8	Final
(Ontario) Rachel Homan	0	1	0	1	0	X	X	X	2
(Alberta) Heather Nedohin 🔨	2	0	3	0	3	X	X	X	8

Sheet D	1	2	3	4	5	6	7	8	Final
(Russia) Anna Sidorova	0	1	0	2	2	0	2	0	7
(United States) Erika Brown 🔨	1	0	2	0	0	2	0	0	5

==== Draw 4 ====
Wednesday, October 30, 4:30 pm

Sheet B	1	2	3	4	5	6	7	8	Final
(Saskatchewan) Stefanie Lawton 🔨	0	0	1	0	0	1	0	0	2
(Switzerland) Mirjam Ott	0	1	0	2	0	0	0	1	4

Sheet C	1	2	3	4	5	6	7	8	Final
(South Korea) Kim Ji-sun 🔨	0	2	0	1	0	2	0	1	6
(Manitoba) Chelsea Carey	0	0	1	0	2	0	2	0	5

Sheet D	1	2	3	4	5	6	7	8	Final
(China) Wang Bingyu 🔨	1	0	1	0	0	1	0	0	3
(Sweden) Margaretha Sigfridsson	0	1	0	1	0	0	0	2	4

==== Draw 5 ====
Wednesday, October 30, 7:30 pm

Sheet E	1	2	3	4	5	6	7	8	9	Final
(Scotland) Eve Muirhead 🔨	2	2	1	0	2	0	0	0	1	8
(Ontario) Sherry Middaugh	0	0	0	3	0	1	2	1	0	7

Sheet C	1	2	3	4	5	6	7	8	Final
(Manitoba) Jennifer Jones	0	1	0	1	0	0	2	0	4
(Russia) Anna Sidorova 🔨	0	0	2	0	2	1	0	1	6

==== Draw 6 ====
Thursday, October 31, 9:00 am

Sheet B	1	2	3	4	5	6	7	8	Final
(Switzerland) Mirjam Ott 🔨	3	1	0	1	0	0	2	X	7
(Latvia) Evita Regža	0	0	1	0	0	2	0	X	3

Sheet E	1	2	3	4	5	6	7	8	Final
(Manitoba) Chelsea Carey 🔨	0	1	0	2	0	2	1	X	6
(United States) Erika Brown	0	0	1	0	1	0	0	X	2

==== Draw 7 ====
Thursday, October 31, 12:30 pm

Sheet A	1	2	3	4	5	6	7	8	Final
(South Korea) Kim Ji-sun	0	4	0	0	2	0	0	0	6
(Russia) Anna Sidorova 🔨	1	0	1	1	0	0	1	1	5

Sheet B	1	2	3	4	5	6	7	8	Final
(Ontario) Rachel Homan 🔨	2	0	0	2	0	0	0	1	5
(China) Wang Bingyu	0	1	1	0	0	1	0	0	3

Sheet C	1	2	3	4	5	6	7	8	Final
(Scotland) Eve Muirhead 🔨	0	2	0	0	0	1	0	X	3
(Saskatchewan) Stefanie Lawton	1	0	3	1	2	0	1	X	8

Sheet E	1	2	3	4	5	6	7	8	Final
(Sweden) Margaretha Sigfridsson 🔨	2	0	0	2	2	1	X	X	7
(Japan) Satsuki Fujisawa	0	0	1	0	0	0	X	X	1

==== Draw 8 ====
Thursday, October 31, 4:30 pm

Sheet A	1	2	3	4	5	6	7	8	Final
(Manitoba) Jennifer Jones	1	0	2	1	0	1	2	X	7
(Manitoba) Chelsea Carey	0	1	0	0	0	0	0	X	1

Sheet E	1	2	3	4	5	6	7	8	Final
(Ontario) Sherry Middaugh 🔨	2	2	0	0	0	1	0	2	7
(Switzerland) Mirjam Ott	0	0	2	2	1	0	1	0	6

==== Draw 9 ====
Thursday, October 31, 7:30 pm

Sheet B	1	2	3	4	5	6	7	8	Final
(Alberta) Heather Nedohin	1	0	0	2	0	1	1	X	5
(Japan) Satsuki Fujisawa	0	1	0	0	1	0	0	X	2

Sheet C	1	2	3	4	5	6	7	8	Final
(Ontario) Rachel Homan	0	0	1	1	0	X	X	X	2
(Sweden) Margaretha Sigfridsson 🔨	2	5	0	0	1	X	X	X	8

Sheet E	1	2	3	4	5	6	7	8	Final
(Saskatchewan) Stefanie Lawton 🔨	1	1	0	3	0	1	0	X	6
(Latvia) Evita Regža	0	0	1	0	1	0	1	X	3

==== Draw 10 ====
Friday, November 1, 9:00 am

Sheet D	1	2	3	4	5	6	7	8	9	Final
(Manitoba) Jennifer Jones 🔨	0	2	0	0	0	3	0	0	2	7
(United States) Erika Brown	1	0	1	1	1	0	0	1	0	5

==== Draw 11 ====
Friday, November 1, 12:30 pm

Sheet A	1	2	3	4	5	6	7	8	Final
(Ontario) Sherry Middaugh	0	0	1	0	1	0	1	0	3
(Saskatchewan) Stefanie Lawton 🔨	0	2	0	1	0	3	0	1	7

Sheet B	1	2	3	4	5	6	7	8	Final
(Manitoba) Chelsea Carey 🔨	0	0	2	1	3	0	0	X	6
(Russia) Anna Sidorova	0	1	0	0	0	0	1	X	2

Sheet C	1	2	3	4	5	6	7	8	9	Final
(Alberta) Heather Nedohin	0	1	0	1	0	1	0	0	1	4
(China) Wang Bingyu 🔨	0	0	1	0	1	0	0	1	0	3

Sheet D	1	2	3	4	5	6	7	8	Final
(Ontario) Rachel Homan	0	2	0	2	1	0	4	X	9
(Japan) Satsuki Fujisawa 🔨	1	0	0	0	0	1	0	X	2

==== Draw 12 ====
Friday, November 1, 4:30 pm

Sheet A	1	2	3	4	5	6	7	8	Final
(United States) Erika Brown	0	0	3	0	2	0	1	0	6
(South Korea) Kim Ji-sun 🔨	0	2	0	2	0	2	0	2	8

Sheet D	1	2	3	4	5	6	7	8	Final
(Scotland) Eve Muirhead 🔨	1	0	2	0	2	1	0	0	6
(Latvia) Evita Regža	0	2	0	1	0	0	1	1	5

=== Playoffs ===
The playoffs draw is listed as follows:

Quarterfinals
(Sweden) Margaretha Sigfridsson	4
(Scotland) Eve Muirhead	5
(Saskatchewan) Stefanie Lawton	5
(Manitoba) Jennifer Jones	6
(Alberta) Heather Nedohin	3
(Ontario) Rachel Homan	6
(Switzerland) Mirjam Ott	3
(South Korea) Kim Ji-sun	2

Semifinals
(Scotland) Eve Muirhead	7
(Manitoba) Jennifer Jones	3
(Ontario) Rachel Homan	6
(Switzerland) Mirjam Ott	3

Final
(Scotland) Eve Muirhead	5
(Ontario) Rachel Homan	7

==== Quarterfinals ====
Saturday, November 2, 12:30 pm

Team	1	2	3	4	5	6	7	8	9	Final
(Sweden) Margaretha Sigfridsson 🔨	1	0	0	0	1	0	1	1	0	4
(Scotland) Eve Muirhead	0	1	1	0	0	2	0	0	1	5

Team	1	2	3	4	5	6	7	8	9	Final
(Saskatchewan) Stefanie Lawton 🔨	0	1	0	1	0	1	0	2	0	5
(Manitoba) Jennifer Jones	0	0	1	0	1	0	3	0	1	6

Team	1	2	3	4	5	6	7	8	Final
(Alberta) Heather Nedohin 🔨	0	2	0	0	1	0	0	0	3
(Ontario) Rachel Homan	0	0	2	1	0	0	2	1	6

Team	1	2	3	4	5	6	7	8	Final
(Switzerland) Mirjam Ott	0	0	1	0	1	1	0	0	3
(South Korea) Kim Ji-sun 🔨	0	0	0	1	0	0	1	0	2

==== Semifinals ====
Saturday, November 2, 7:30 pm

Team	1	2	3	4	5	6	7	8	Final
(Scotland) Eve Muirhead	0	2	0	2	0	1	2	X	7
(Manitoba) Jennifer Jones 🔨	1	0	1	0	1	0	0	X	3

Team	1	2	3	4	5	6	7	8	Final
(Ontario) Rachel Homan	0	0	1	0	2	0	3	X	6
(Switzerland) Mirjam Ott 🔨	0	1	0	1	0	1	0	X	3

==== Final ====
Sunday, November 3, 3:00 pm

Team	1	2	3	4	5	6	7	8	Final
(Scotland) Eve Muirhead 🔨	1	0	1	0	1	0	2	0	5
(Ontario) Rachel Homan	0	2	0	3	0	1	0	1	7

Player percentages
(Scotland) Eve Muirhead		(Ontario) Rachel Homan	
Claire Hamilton	82%	Lisa Weagle	81%
Vicki Adams	86%	Alison Kreviazuk	92%
Anna Sloan	76%	Emma Miskew	92%
Eve Muirhead	64%	Rachel Homan	84%
Total	77%	Total	87%
