= Curling at the 2014 Winter Olympics – Qualification event =

Curling at the 2014 Winter Olympics Qualification event
- Host city: Füssen, Germany
- Arena: BLZ Arena
- Dates: December 10–15, 2013
- Men's winner: Germany
- Curling club: CC Hamburg, Hamburg
- Skip: John Jahr
- Fourth: Felix Schulze
- Second: Peter Rickmers
- Lead: Sven Goldemann
- Finalist: United States (John Shuster)
- Women's winner: China
- Curling club: Harbin CC, Harbin
- Skip: Wang Bingyu
- Third: Liu Yin
- Second: Yue Qingshuang
- Lead: Zhou Yan
- Finalist: Japan (Ayumi Ogasawara)

The qualification event for the curling tournament at the 2014 Winter Olympics was held from December 10 to 15, 2013 at the BLZ Arena in Füssen, Germany. The top two teams from the qualification event qualified their nations to participate in the Olympics. The qualification event was open to any nations that earned qualification points at the 2012 or 2013 World Curling Championships or participated at the 2011 World Curling Championships (the South Korea men's team and the Norway women's team).

== Competition format ==
In both the men's and the women's tournaments, the teams played a single round robin, and at its conclusion, the top three teams advanced to the playoffs. In the playoffs, the first and second seeds played a game to determine the first team to advance to the main Olympic tournament. The loser of this game, along with the third seed, played a game to determine the second team to advance to the main Olympic tournament.

== Men ==
=== Teams ===
Czech Republic	Finland	France	Germany
Skip: Jiří Snítil; Third: Martin Snítil; Second: Jindřich Kitzberger; Lead: Marek Vydra; Alternate: Jakub Bareš	Skip: Aku Kauste; Third: Jani Sullanmaa; Second: Pauli Jäämies; Lead: Janne Pitko; Alternate: Leo Mäkelä	Fourth: Tony Angiboust; Skip: Thomas Dufour; Second: Wilfrid Coulot; Lead: Jérémy Frarier; Alternate: Romain Borini	Fourth: Felix Schulze; Skip: John Jahr; Second: Christopher Bartsch; Lead: Sven Goldemann; Alternate: Peter Rickmers
Japan	New Zealand	South Korea	United States
Skip: Yusuke Morozumi; Third: Tsuyoshi Yamaguchi; Second: Tetsuro Shimizu; Lead: Kosuke Morozumi; Alternate: Shinya Abe	Skip: Peter de Boer; Third: Sean Becker; Second: Scott Becker; Lead: Kenny Thomson; Alternate: Phil Dowling	Skip: Kim Soo-hyuk; Third: Kim Tae-hwan; Second: Park Jong-duk; Lead: Nam Yoon-ho; Alternate: Lee Ye-jun	Skip: John Shuster; Third: Jeff Isaacson; Second: Jared Zezel; Lead: John Landsteiner; Alternate: Craig Brown

=== Round-robin standings ===
Final round-robin standings

Key
Teams to Playoffs
Teams to Tiebreaker

Country	Skip	W	L
Germany	John Jahr	5	2
Czech Republic	Jiří Snítil	5	2
United States	John Shuster	5	2
South Korea	Kim Soo-hyuk	5	2
New Zealand	Peter de Boer	3	4
France	Thomas Dufour	2	5
Finland	Aku Kauste	2	5
Japan	Yusuke Morozumi	1	6

=== Round-robin results ===
All draw times are listed in Central European Time (UTC+1).

==== Draw 1 ====
Tuesday, December 10, 16:00

Sheet A	1	2	3	4	5	6	7	8	9	10	Final
South Korea (Kim)	0	1	0	3	0	1	2	2	X	X	9
Japan (Morozumi)	1	0	1	0	1	0	0	0	X	X	3

Sheet B	1	2	3	4	5	6	7	8	9	10	Final
New Zealand (de Boer)	2	0	0	1	0	0	0	2	0	1	6
Finland (Kauste)	0	1	0	1	0	2	0	0	1	0	4

Sheet C	1	2	3	4	5	6	7	8	9	10	Final
United States (Shuster)	2	0	0	3	0	1	0	1	0	0	7
Czech Republic (Snítil)	0	1	3	0	1	0	2	0	1	1	9

Sheet D	1	2	3	4	5	6	7	8	9	10	Final
Germany (Jahr)	0	0	0	2	0	1	0	0	X	X	3
France (Dufour)	1	0	0	0	3	0	0	4	X	X	8

==== Draw 2 ====
Wednesday, December 11, 8:00

Sheet A	1	2	3	4	5	6	7	8	9	10	Final
New Zealand (de Boer)	1	0	0	3	0	0	2	0	0	0	6
United States (Shuster)	0	1	1	0	2	0	0	1	1	1	7

Sheet B	1	2	3	4	5	6	7	8	9	10	Final
Germany (Jahr)	2	0	1	0	0	2	0	0	1	1	7
South Korea (Kim)	0	3	0	0	1	0	1	3	0	0	8

Sheet C	1	2	3	4	5	6	7	8	9	10	Final
France (Dufour)	0	2	0	1	0	0	1	0	0	X	4
Japan (Morozumi)	1	0	2	0	0	2	0	1	2	X	8

Sheet D	1	2	3	4	5	6	7	8	9	10	Final
Finland (Kauste)	0	0	3	0	0	1	0	0	0	0	4
Czech Republic (Snítil)	0	1	0	2	0	0	0	0	2	1	6

==== Draw 3 ====
Wednesday, December 11, 16:00

Sheet A	1	2	3	4	5	6	7	8	9	10	Final
Finland (Kauste)	0	0	0	1	0	0	X	X	X	X	1
South Korea (Kim)	2	1	3	0	1	2	X	X	X	X	9

Sheet B	1	2	3	4	5	6	7	8	9	10	Final
United States (Shuster)	0	1	2	1	2	0	0	2	2	X	10
France (Dufour)	2	0	0	0	0	1	1	0	0	X	4

Sheet C	1	2	3	4	5	6	7	8	9	10	Final
Czech Republic (Snítil)	2	0	0	1	0	2	0	0	1	0	6
Germany (Jahr)	0	2	1	0	2	0	0	2	0	0	7

Sheet D	1	2	3	4	5	6	7	8	9	10	Final
New Zealand (de Boer)	1	2	0	3	0	1	0	1	X	X	8
Japan (Morozumi)	0	0	1	0	1	0	1	0	X	X	3

==== Draw 4 ====
Thursday, December 12, 9:00

Sheet A	1	2	3	4	5	6	7	8	9	10	Final
Czech Republic (Snítil)	0	0	2	0	1	0	1	0	1	0	5
France (Dufour)	0	1	0	1	0	2	0	2	0	1	7

Sheet B	1	2	3	4	5	6	7	8	9	10	Final
Finland (Kauste)	2	0	2	1	0	2	0	1	0	2	10
Japan (Morozumi)	0	1	0	0	2	0	2	0	2	0	7

Sheet C	1	2	3	4	5	6	7	8	9	10	Final
New Zealand (de Boer)	0	0	2	0	2	0	0	2	0	X	6
South Korea (Kim)	2	1	0	2	0	0	3	0	2	X	10

Sheet D	1	2	3	4	5	6	7	8	9	10	Final
United States (Shuster)	0	2	0	0	0	1	1	0	3	0	7
Germany (Jahr)	2	0	0	2	0	0	0	1	0	3	8

==== Draw 5 ====
Thursday, December 12, 19:00

Sheet A	1	2	3	4	5	6	7	8	9	10	Final
Germany (Jahr)	0	1	2	0	1	0	1	0	0	1	6
New Zealand (de Boer)	1	0	0	2	0	1	0	1	0	0	5

Sheet B	1	2	3	4	5	6	7	8	9	10	Final
South Korea (Kim)	0	0	1	2	0	0	1	0	0	X	4
Czech Republic (Snítil)	1	2	0	0	2	0	0	3	2	X	10

Sheet C	1	2	3	4	5	6	7	8	9	10	Final
Japan (Morozumi)	1	0	0	1	0	0	0	0	X	X	2
United States (Shuster)	0	2	1	0	2	0	1	2	X	X	8

Sheet D	1	2	3	4	5	6	7	8	9	10	Final
France (Dufour)	0	0	0	2	0	2	0	0	1	0	5
Finland (Kauste)	0	0	2	0	1	0	0	1	0	2	6

==== Draw 6 ====
Friday, December 13, 12:00

Sheet A	1	2	3	4	5	6	7	8	9	10	Final
Japan (Morozumi)	0	0	1	0	1	0	1	0	1	1	5
Czech Republic (Snítil)	1	1	0	0	0	2	0	2	0	0	6

Sheet B	1	2	3	4	5	6	7	8	9	10	Final
France (Dufour)	0	1	0	2	0	0	1	0	0	X	4
New Zealand (de Boer)	0	0	2	0	3	0	0	0	3	X	8

Sheet C	1	2	3	4	5	6	7	8	9	10	Final
Germany (Jahr)	0	2	1	0	1	0	1	2	0	1	8
Finland (Kauste)	0	0	0	1	0	1	0	0	2	0	4

Sheet D	1	2	3	4	5	6	7	8	9	10	Final
South Korea (Kim)	2	0	1	0	1	0	2	0	0	X	6
United States (Shuster)	0	1	0	3	0	1	0	2	2	X	9

==== Draw 7 ====
Friday, December 13, 20:00

Sheet A	1	2	3	4	5	6	7	8	9	10	Final
United States (Shuster)	3	1	0	0	1	0	2	0	3	X	10
Finland (Kauste)	0	0	0	2	0	1	0	1	0	X	4

Sheet B	1	2	3	4	5	6	7	8	9	10	11	Final
Japan (Morozumi)	0	3	0	0	1	0	0	0	2	1	0	7
Germany (Jahr)	2	0	2	2	0	0	0	1	0	0	1	8

Sheet C	1	2	3	4	5	6	7	8	9	10	Final
South Korea (Kim)	0	2	1	1	0	2	0	1	X	X	7
France (Dufour)	1	0	0	0	1	0	0	0	X	X	2

Sheet D	1	2	3	4	5	6	7	8	9	10	Final
Czech Republic (Snítil)	0	1	0	1	0	2	0	2	0	1	7
New Zealand (de Boer)	0	0	1	0	1	0	2	0	2	0	6

=== Tiebreaker ===
Saturday, December 14, 16:00

Sheet A	1	2	3	4	5	6	7	8	9	10	Final
United States (Shuster)	2	0	1	1	0	1	0	1	0	1	7
South Korea (Kim)	0	2	0	0	1	0	1	0	1	0	5

Player percentages
United States		South Korea	
John Landsteiner	84%	Nam Yoon-ho	84%
Jared Zezel	82%	Park Jong-duk	81%
Jeff Isaacson	78%	Kim Tae-hwan	74%
John Shuster	76%	Kim Soo-hyuk	81%
Total	80%	Total	80%

=== Playoffs ===
Second qualifier			First qualifier
			1	Germany	7
2	Czech Republic	5	2	Czech Republic	4
3	United States	8

==== First qualifier ====
Saturday, December 14, 20:00

Sheet C	1	2	3	4	5	6	7	8	9	10	11	Final
Germany (Jahr)	0	1	0	0	3	0	0	0	0	0	3	7
Czech Republic (Snítil)	0	0	0	1	0	1	0	0	1	1	0	4

Player percentages
Germany		Czech Republic	
Sven Goldemann	78%	Marek Vydra	77%
Christopher Bartsch	80%	Jindřich Kitzberger	83%
John Jahr	80%	Martin Snítil	75%
Felix Schulze	83%	Jiří Snítil	81%
Total	80%	Total	79%

==== Second qualifier ====
Sunday, December 15, 12:30

Sheet B	1	2	3	4	5	6	7	8	9	10	Final
Czech Republic (Snítil)	0	0	2	0	0	0	1	0	2	0	5
United States (Shuster)	0	1	0	0	1	0	0	5	0	1	8

Player percentages
Czech Republic		United States	
Marek Vydra	77%	John Landsteiner	84%
Jindřich Kitzberger	81%	Jared Zezel	81%
Martin Snítil	74%	Jeff Isaacson	79%
Jiří Snítil	80%	John Shuster	75%
Total	78%	Total	80%

== Women ==
=== Teams ===
China	Czech Republic	Germany	Japan
Skip: Wang Bingyu; Third: Liu Yin; Second: Yue Qingshuang; Lead: Zhou Yan; Alternate: Jiang Yilun	Skip: Anna Kubešková; Third: Tereza Plíšková; Second: Klára Svatoňová; Lead: Veronika Herdová; Alternate: Martina Strnadová	Skip: Andrea Schöpp; Third: Imogen Oona Lehmann; Second: Corinna Scholz; Lead: Stella Heiß; Alternate: Nicole Muskatewitz	Skip: Ayumi Ogasawara; Third: Yumie Funayama; Second: Kaho Onodera; Lead: Michiko Tomabechi; Alternate: Chinami Yoshida
Italy	Latvia	Norway	
Skip: Veronica Zappone; Third: Sara Levetti; Second: Elisa Patono; Lead: Arianna Losano; Alternate: Martina Bronsino	Skip: Iveta Staša-Šaršūne; Third: Ieva Krusta; Second: Zanda Bikše; Lead: Dace Munča; Alternate: Una Ģērmane	Skip: Marianne Rørvik; Third: Anneline Skårsmoen; Second: Camilla Holth; Lead: Julie Kjær Molnar; Alternate: Pia Trulsen	

=== Round-robin standings ===
Final round-robin standings

Key
Teams to Playoffs
Teams to Tiebreaker

Country	Skip	W	L
China	Wang Bingyu	6	0
Japan	Ayumi Ogasawara	5	1
Norway	Marianne Rørvik	3	3
Germany	Andrea Schöpp	3	3
Czech Republic	Anna Kubešková	2	4
Latvia	Iveta Staša-Šaršūne	2	4
Italy	Veronica Zappone	0	6

=== Round-robin results ===
All draw times are listed in Central European Time (UTC+1).

==== Draw 1 ====
Tuesday, December 10, 20:00

Sheet A	1	2	3	4	5	6	7	8	9	10	Final
Italy (Zappone)	1	0	0	1	0	1	0	3	0	1	7
Latvia (Staša-Šaršūne)	0	2	2	0	1	0	1	0	2	0	8

Sheet B	1	2	3	4	5	6	7	8	9	10	Final
Norway (Rørvik)	0	1	0	0	2	1	0	1	1	0	6
Czech Republic (Kubešková)	2	0	2	1	0	0	2	0	0	1	8

Sheet C	1	2	3	4	5	6	7	8	9	10	Final
Germany (Schöpp)	0	0	0	1	0	3	0	2	0	0	6
China (Wang)	2	1	1	0	1	0	1	0	0	1	7

==== Draw 2 ====
Wednesday, December 11, 12:00

Sheet A	1	2	3	4	5	6	7	8	9	10	Final
Germany (Schöpp)	0	1	1	0	0	2	0	4	1	X	9
Czech Republic (Kubešková)	0	0	0	2	1	0	1	0	0	X	4

Sheet B	1	2	3	4	5	6	7	8	9	10	Final
Japan (Ogasawara)	0	2	0	0	1	0	0	2	0	2	7
Italy (Zappone)	1	0	1	1	0	1	0	0	1	0	5

Sheet C	1	2	3	4	5	6	7	8	9	10	Final
Latvia (Staša-Šaršūne)	1	0	0	1	0	1	0	0	1	X	4
Norway (Rørvik)	0	0	1	0	2	0	2	2	0	X	7

==== Draw 3 ====
Wednesday, December 11, 20:00

Sheet A	1	2	3	4	5	6	7	8	9	10	Final
Japan (Ogasawara)	0	0	4	0	0	2	1	0	2	X	9
Norway (Rørvik)	0	1	0	3	0	0	0	1	0	X	5

Sheet B	1	2	3	4	5	6	7	8	9	10	11	Final
Latvia (Staša-Šaršūne)	2	0	1	0	2	1	0	0	1	0	0	7
Germany (Schöpp)	0	2	0	2	0	0	2	1	0	0	1	8

Sheet C	1	2	3	4	5	6	7	8	9	10	Final
China (Wang)	1	0	2	2	1	0	1	1	0	2	10
Czech Republic (Kubešková)	0	1	0	0	0	2	0	0	3	0	6

==== Draw 4 ====
Thursday, December 12, 14:00

Sheet B	1	2	3	4	5	6	7	8	9	10	Final
China (Wang)	0	2	0	1	1	0	1	1	3	X	9
Norway (Rørvik)	1	0	1	0	0	1	0	0	0	X	3

Sheet C	1	2	3	4	5	6	7	8	9	10	Final
Japan (Ogasawara)	2	0	2	0	0	0	0	2	2	1	9
Latvia (Staša-Šaršūne)	0	1	0	2	2	1	1	0	0	0	7

Sheet D	1	2	3	4	5	6	7	8	9	10	Final
Czech Republic (Kubešková)	2	0	1	0	5	0	1	0	X	X	9
Italy (Zappone)	0	1	0	0	0	1	0	1	X	X	3

==== Draw 5 ====
Friday, December 13, 8:00

Sheet B	1	2	3	4	5	6	7	8	9	10	Final
Germany (Schöpp)	0	0	2	0	0	1	0	1	0	X	4
Japan (Ogasawara)	1	1	0	1	3	0	2	0	2	X	10

Sheet C	1	2	3	4	5	6	7	8	9	10	Final
Norway (Rørvik)	0	2	0	1	0	3	0	1	0	1	8
Italy (Zappone)	0	0	1	0	1	0	1	0	3	0	6

Sheet D	1	2	3	4	5	6	7	8	9	10	Final
Latvia (Staša-Šaršūne)	1	0	1	0	1	0	1	0	1	0	5
China (Wang)	0	1	0	1	0	2	0	3	0	1	8

==== Draw 6 ====
Friday, December 13, 16:00

Sheet B	1	2	3	4	5	6	7	8	9	10	Final
Italy (Zappone)	0	1	0	2	0	0	1	0	1	X	5
China (Wang)	1	0	2	0	2	2	0	2	0	X	9

Sheet C	1	2	3	4	5	6	7	8	9	10	Final
Czech Republic (Kubešková)	0	0	1	0	1	0	1	0	1	X	4
Japan (Ogasawara)	0	0	0	4	0	2	0	1	0	X	7

Sheet D	1	2	3	4	5	6	7	8	9	10	Final
Norway (Rørvik)	2	0	2	0	0	0	0	1	1	1	7
Germany (Schöpp)	0	2	0	0	0	2	0	0	0	0	4

==== Draw 7 ====
Saturday, December 14, 8:00

Sheet A	1	2	3	4	5	6	7	8	9	10	Final
China (Wang)	0	5	2	0	3	0	X	X	X	X	10
Japan (Ogasawara)	1	0	0	1	0	2	X	X	X	X	4

Sheet B	1	2	3	4	5	6	7	8	9	10	Final
Czech Republic (Kubešková)	0	1	0	0	0	0	0	1	0	X	2
Latvia (Staša-Šaršūne)	0	0	1	0	1	2	1	0	1	X	6

Sheet C	1	2	3	4	5	6	7	8	9	10	Final
Italy (Zappone)	0	0	1	0	1	0	0	0	X	X	2
Germany (Schöpp)	0	2	0	1	0	1	2	1	X	X	7

=== Tiebreaker ===
Saturday, December 14, 16:00

Sheet B	1	2	3	4	5	6	7	8	9	10	Final
Norway (Rørvik)	1	0	0	0	1	0	1	1	0	1	5
Germany (Schöpp)	0	2	1	0	0	1	0	0	0	0	4

Player percentages
Norway		Germany	
Julie Kjær Molnar	80%	Corinna Scholz	78%
Camilla Holth	68%	Nicole Muskatewitz	72%
Anneline Skårsmoen	73%	Imogen Oona Lehmann	82%
Marianne Rørvik	74%	Andrea Schöpp	73%
Total	74%	Total	76%

=== Playoffs ===
Second qualifier			First qualifier
			1	China	7
2	Japan	10	2	Japan	6
3	Norway	4

==== First qualifier ====
Sunday, December 15, 8:30

Sheet C	1	2	3	4	5	6	7	8	9	10	Final
China (Wang)	1	0	0	2	0	3	0	1	0	0	7
Japan (Ogasawara)	0	0	1	0	1	0	2	0	1	1	6

Player percentages
China		Japan	
Zhou Yan	80%	Michiko Tomabechi	81%
Yue Qingshuang	81%	Kaho Onodera	80%
Liu Yin	82%	Yumie Funayama	74%
Wang Bingyu	80%	Ayumi Ogasawara	74%
Total	81%	Total	77%

==== Second qualifier ====
Sunday, December 15, 16:30

Sheet B	1	2	3	4	5	6	7	8	9	10	Final
Japan (Ogasawara)	1	0	0	1	1	0	0	6	1	X	10
Norway (Rørvik)	0	2	1	0	0	0	1	0	0	X	4

Player percentages
Japan		Norway	
Michiko Tomabechi	81%	Julie Kjær Molnar	80%
Kaho Onodera	80%	Camilla Holth	68%
Yumie Funayama	74%	Anneline Skårsmoen	70%
Ayumi Ogasawara	74%	Marianne Rørvik	73%
Total	77%	Total	73%
