= Phil Dowling =

New Zealand male curler

- Curler
- Born: 22 June 1967 (age 59)

Team
- Curling club: Naseby CC, Mt. Ida CC
- Skip: Peter de Boer
- Third: Kenny Thomson
- Second: Gordon Hay
- Lead: Phil Dowling

Curling career
- Member Association: New Zealand
- World Championship: 1 (2012)
- Pacific-Asia Championship: 3 (2011, 2012, 2013)
Medal record
Curling
Pacific-Asia Championships
Silver medal – second place	2011 Nanjing
New Zealand Men's Championship
Gold medal – first place	2011 Naseby
Gold medal – first place	2016 Naseby
Gold medal – first place	2019 Naseby
Silver medal – second place	2008 Naseby
Silver medal – second place	2015 Naseby
Silver medal – second place	2017 Dunedin
Silver medal – second place	2018 Naseby
Silver medal – second place	2022 Naseby
Bronze medal – third place	2014 Naseby
Bronze medal – third place	2020 Naseby
Bronze medal – third place	2023 Naseby

Phil Dowling (born 22 June 1967) is a New Zealand curler.

At the international level, he is a 2011 Pacific-Asian silver medallist.

At the national level, he is a two-time New Zealand men's champion curler (2011, 2016).

== Teams ==
Season	Skip	Third	Second	Lead	Alternate	Coach	Events
2007–08	David Greer	Nelson Ede	Phil Dowling	Robbie Dobson			NZMCC 2008 (silver)
2010–11	Sean Becker	Scott Becker	Phil Dowling	Dan Thurlow			NZMCC 2011 (gold)
2011–12	Peter de Boer	Sean Becker	Scott Becker	Kenny Thomson	Phil Dowling	Peter Becker	PACC 2011 (silver); WCC 2012 (5th)
2012–13	Peter de Boer	Sean Becker	Scott Becker	Kenny Thomson	Phil Dowling	Peter Becker	PACC 2012 (6th)
2013–14	Peter de Boer	Sean Becker	Scott Becker	Kenny Thomson	Phil Dowling	Peter Becker	PACC 2013 (4th); OQE 2013 (5th)
2013–14	Kenny Thomson	Peter de Boer	Warren Dobson	Phil Dowling			NZMCC 2014 (bronze)
2014–15	Peter de Boer	Warren Kearney	Iain Craig	Phil Dowling			NZMCC 2015 (silver)
2015–16	Peter de Boer	Brett Sargon	Kenny Thomson	Phil Dowling			NZMCC 2016 (gold)
2016–17	Peter de Boer	Brett Sargon	Warren Kearney	Phil Dowling			NZMCC 2017 (silver)
2017–18	Peter de Boer	Kenny Thomson	Phil Dowling	Iain Craig			NZMCC 2018 (silver)
2023–24	Peter de Boer	Kenny Thomson	Gordon Hay	Phil Dowling			NZMCC 2023 (bronze)
