= New Zealand Mixed Curling Championship =

Annual national curling competition

The New Zealand Mixed Curling Championship is the national championship of mixed curling (two men and two women) in New Zealand. It has been held annually since 2010 and organized by New Zealand Curling Association.

In mixed curling, the positions on a team must alternate between men and women. If a man throws last rocks, which is usually the case, the women must throw lead rocks and third rocks, while the other male member of the team throws second rocks.

== List of champions and medallists ==
The past champions and medalists of the event are listed as follows (in order – fourth/skip, third, second, lead, alternate; skips marked bold):

Year	Host city Dates	Champion	Runner-up	Bronze
2010	6—7 June; Auckland	Kenny Thomson, Brydie Donald, Lorne DePape, Marisa Jones	Len Hill, Christine Bewick, Len McSaveney, Beth Gibbs	Brett Sargon, Brittany Taylor, Kieran Ford, Eleanor Adviento
2011	5—6 June; Auckland	Kenny Williamson, Liz Matthews, Ian Ford, Pauline Farra	Peter Taylor, Glenys Taylor, Al Langille, Miriam Tackoor	Iain Craig, Tash Dallow, Lorne DePape, Brianne Koning
2012	3—4 June; Auckland	Iain Craig, Tessa Farley, Josh Dallow, Holly Gosse	Kieran Ford, Eleanor Adviento, Brett Sargon, Kelsi Heath	Al Langille, Glenys Taylor, Peter Taylor, Anne Huddleston
2013	2—3 June; Auckland	Iain Craig, Brianne Koning, Josh Dallow, Holly Gosse	Thivya Jeyaranjan, Jon Jaksic, Dean Fotti, Tessa Farley, alternate: Craig Parr-Whalley	Elizabeth Matthews, Kenny Williamson, Pauline Farra, Ian Ford
2014	1—2 June; Auckland	Iain Craig, Tash Dallow, Josh Dallow, Holly Gosse	Liz Matthews, Kenny Williamson, Pauline Farra, Ian Ford	Thivya Jeyaranjan, Ben Frew, Eleanor Adviento, Kieran Grieve
2015	31 May — 1 June; Auckland	Dave Watt, Thivya Jeyaranjan, Garion Long, Waverley Taylor	Iain Craig, Natasha Dallow, Josh Dallow, Holly Gosse	Brett Sargon, Eleanor Adviento, Kieran Ford, Emily Whelan
2016	5—6 June; Auckland	Brett Sargon, Eleanor Adviento, Kieran Ford, Thivya Jeyaranjan	Peter de Boer, Sophie Tran, Lorne DePape, Anna de Boer	Garion Long, Claire Suen, Kieran Grieve, Elizabeth McLean
2017	4—5 June; Auckland	Brett Sargon, Eleanor Adviento, Kieran Ford, Thivya Jeyaranjan	Iain Craig, Zoe Breeze, Steve McLean, Elizabeth McLean, Dean Fotti	Garion Long, Emily Whelan, Kieran Grieve, Rebecca Treacy
2018	3—4 June; Auckland	Dave Watt, Brittany Taylor, Lorne DePape, Glenys Taylor	Garion Long, Rebecca Treacy, Benjamin Frew	Kieran Grieve, Liz Matthews, Keith Bond
2019	2—3 June; Auckland	Garion Long, Thivya Jeyaranjan, Benjamin Frew, Jennifer Jack	Glenys Taylor, Peter Taylor, Sasha Goloborodko, Nikita Derevianko	Katrina Shepard, Kieran Grieve, Jasman Kaur
2020	2—5 June; Auckland	Garion Long, Rebecca Long, Benjamin Frew	Kieran Ford, Chelsea Farley, Brett Sargon	Iain Craig, Jo Olszewski, Dean Fotti, Gillian Craig
2021	6—7 June; Auckland	Garion Long, Zoe Harman, Brett Sargon, Rebecca Long	Lorne DePape, Tess Farley, William Sheard, Ariel Weber	Iain Craig, Chelsea Suddens, Nikita Derevianko, Sasha Goloborodko
2022	5—6 June; Auckland	Brett Sargon, Holly Thompson, Kieran Ford, Shay Bijoux	Dean Fotti, Jo Olszewski, Sandra Thomas, Matt Whineray	William Sheard, Ariel Weber, Cristián Jara, Jill Cox
2023	4—5 June; Auckland	Dave Watt, Courtney Smith, Will Sheard, Mhairi-Bronté Duncan	Brett Sargon, Holly Thompson, Kieran Ford, Olivia Russell	Iain Craig, Sasha Goloborodko, Nikita Derevianko, Gillian Craig

== See also ==
- New Zealand Men's Curling Championship
- New Zealand Women's Curling Championship
- New Zealand Mixed Doubles Curling Championship
- New Zealand Junior Mixed Doubles Championship
