= Marisa Jones =

New Zealand curler

- Curler
- Born: Ranfurly, New Zealand

Team
- Curling club: Ranfurly CC

Curling career
- Member Association: New Zealand
- World Mixed Doubles Championship: 1 (2015)
- Pacific-Asia Championship: 7 (2004, 2005, 2006, 2008, 2009, 2010, 2012)
- Other appearances: World Junior-B Championships: 2 (2003, 2004), Pacific-Asia Junior Championships: 1 (2005)
Medal record
Curling
New Zealand Women's Championship
Gold medal – first place	2009 Dunedin
Gold medal – first place	2010 Naseby
Gold medal – first place	2011 Naseby
Gold medal – first place	2012 Naseby
Silver medal – second place	2005 ...
Silver medal – second place	2006 ...
Silver medal – second place	2008 Naseby
Bronze medal – third place	2014 Naseby
New Zealand Mixed Championship
Gold medal – first place	2010 Auckland
New Zealand Mixed Doubles Championship
Gold medal – first place	2014 Naseby
Silver medal – second place	2015 Dunedin
Bronze medal – third place	2011 Dunedin

Marisa Jones is a New Zealand curler and curling coach.

At the national level, she is a four-time New Zealand women's champion curler (2009, 2010, 2011, 2012), 2010 New Zealand mixed champion curler, and 2014 New Zealand mixed doubles champion curler.

== Teams and events ==
=== Women's ===
Season	Skip	Third	Second	Lead	Alternate	Coach	Events
2002—03	Natalie Campbell	Catherine Vaka	Brydie Donald	Natasha Dallow	Marisa Jones	Liz Matthews	WJBCC 2003 (6th)
2003—04	Brydie Donald	Catherine Vaka	Natasha Dallow	Marisa Jones	Abby Lee Pyle	Liz Matthews	WJBCC 2004 (5th)
2004—05	Brydie Donald	Natasha Dallow	Marisa Jones	Abby Lee Pyle	Charmian Pearson-White	Liz Matthews	PAJCC 2005 (4th)
2004—05	Bridget Becker	Natalie Campbell	Brydie Donald	Catherine Inder	Marisa Jones	Sharon Delver	PACC 2004 (4th)
2004—05	Natasha Dallow	Heather Jamieson	Abby Pyle	Marisa Jones			NZWCC 2005 (silver)
2005—06	Bridget Becker	Brydie Donald	Natalie Campbell	Catherine Inder	Marisa Jones	Peter Becker	PACC 2005 (4th)
2005—06	Bridget Becker	Natasha Dallow	Abby Lee Pyle	Marisa Jones	Heather Jamieson	Sharon Delver	PAJCC 2006 (4th)
2005—06	Cass Becker	Marisa Jones	Abby Pyle	Heather Jamieson			NZWCC 2006 (silver)
2006—07	Bridget Becker	Brydie Donald	Natalie Campbell	Catherine Inder	Marisa Jones	Peter Becker	PACC 2006 (4th)
2007—08	Natalie Campbell	Kylie Petherick	Marisa Jones	Catherine Rissel			NZWCC 2008 (silver)
2008—09	Bridget Becker	Brydie Donald	Marisa Jones	Catherine Inder	Cassie Becker	Peter Becker, Sharon Delver	PACC 2008 (4th)
2008—09	Bridget Becker	Brydie Donald	Marisa Jones	Linda Geary			NZWCC 2009 (gold)
2009—10	Bridget Becker	Brydie Donald	Marisa Jones	Natalie Campbell		Peter Becker	PACC 2009 (4th); NZWCC 2010 (gold)
2010—11	Brydie Donald	Bridget Becker	Marisa Jones	Natalie Campbell	Katie Bauer	Peter Becker	PACC 2010 (4th)
2010—11	Brydie Donald	Natalie Campbell	Marisa Jones	Jess Zinsli	Katie Bauer		NZWCC 2011 (gold)
2011—12	Bridget Becker	Brydie Donald	Marisa Jones	Natalie Thurlow			NZWCC 2012 (gold)
2012—13	Bridget Becker	Brydie Donald	Marisa Jones	Kelsi Heath	Thivya Jeyaranjan	Rupert Jones	PACC 2012 (5th)
2013—14	Bridget Becker	Marisa Jones	Kelsi Heath	Waverley Taylor			NZWCC 2014 (bronze)

=== Mixed ===
Season	Skip	Third	Second	Lead	Events
2009–10	Kenny Thomson	Brydie Donald	Lorne De Pape	Marisa Jones	NZMxCC 2010 (gold)

=== Mixed doubles ===
Season	Female	Male	Coach	Events
2008–09	Marisa Jones	Warren Kearney		NZMDCC 2008 (4th)
2009–10	Marisa Jones	Kris Miller		NZMDCC 2009 (8th)
2010–11	Marisa Jones	Nelson Ede		NZMDCC 2010 (5th)
2011–12	Marisa Jones	Nelson Ede		NZMDCC 2011 (bronze)
2012–13	Marisa Jones	Kenny Thomson		NZMDCC 2012 (5th)
2013–14	Marisa Jones	Rupert Jones		NZMDCC 2013 (5th)
2014–15	Marisa Jones	Dan Mustapic	Hans Frauenlob (WMDCC)	NZMDCC 2014 (gold); WMDCC 2015 (20th)
2015–16	Marisa Jones	Warren Kearney		NZMDCC 2015 (silver)

== Record as a coach of national teams ==
Year	Tournament, event	National team	Place
2008	2008 Pacific-Asia Junior Curling Championships	Australia (juniors women)	4
