= 2011 Pacific-Asia Curling Championships =

- Host city: Nanjing, China
- Arena: Nanjing Olympic Sports Center
- Dates: November 19–26
- Men's winner: China
- Curling club: Harbin CC, Harbin
- Skip: Liu Rui
- Third: Xu Xiaoming
- Second: Ba Dexin
- Lead: Chen Lu'an
- Alternate: Zang Jialiang
- Coach: Lorne Hamblin
- Finalist: New Zealand (Peter de Boer)
- Women's winner: China
- Curling club: Harbin CC, Harbin
- Skip: Wang Bingyu
- Third: Sun Yue
- Second: Yue Qingshuang
- Lead: Zhou Yan
- Alternate: Liu Jinli
- Coach: Zhang Wei
- Finalist: South Korea (Kim Ji-sun)

The 2011 Pacific-Asia Curling Championships were held from November 19 to 26 at the Nanjing Olympic Sports Center in Nanjing, China. The Pacific Championships acted as the Pacific Zone qualifiers for the 2012 World Curling Championships. The top two women's berths (China and Korea) qualified for the 2012 Ford World Women's Curling Championship in Lethbridge, Alberta, while the top two men's berths (China and New Zealand) qualified for the 2012 Capital One World Men's Curling Championship in Basel, Switzerland.

== Men ==
=== Teams ===
Australia	China	Chinese Taipei
Skip: Hugh Millikin Third: Wyatt Buck; Second: Matthew Panoussi; Lead: Vaughan Rosier; Coach: Gwyn Buck	Skip: Liu Rui Third: Xu Xiaoming; Second: Ba Dexin; Lead: Chen Lu'an; Alternate: Zang Jialiang; Coach: Lorne Hamblin	Skip: Randolph Shen Third: Brendon Liu; Second: Nicholas Hsu; Lead: Justin Hsu; Alternate: Steve Koo; Coach: Greg Monkman
Japan	South Korea	New Zealand
Skip: Makoto Tsuruga Third: Yuki Sawamukai; Second: Yusaku Shibaya; Lead: Ryosuke Haneishi; Alternate: Taichi Teramachi; Coaches: Hitoshi Matsudaira, Shinya Abe	Skip: Kim Chang-min Third: Kim Min-chan; Second: Seong Se-hyeon; Lead: Seo Young-seon; Alternate: Oh Eun-su; Coach: Kim Kyung-doo	Skip: Peter de Boer Third: Sean Becker; Second: Scott Becker; Lead: Kenny Thomson; Alternate: Phil Dowling; Coach: Peter Becker

=== Round Robin Standings ===
Country	Skip	W	L
China	Liu Rui	9	1
South Korea	Kim Chang-min	7	3
New Zealand	Peter de Boer	5	5
Australia	Hugh Millikin	5	5
Chinese Taipei	Randolph Shen	3	7
Japan	Makoto Tsuruga	1	9

=== Round Robin Results ===
==== Draw 1 ====
Saturday, November 19, 14:30

Sheet A	1	2	3	4	5	6	7	8	9	10	Final
New Zealand (de Boer)	1	0	2	0	0	0	0	2	X	X	5
South Korea (Kim)	0	2	0	4	0	0	3	0	X	X	9

Sheet B	1	2	3	4	5	6	7	8	9	10	Final
Australia (Millikin)	0	0	0	3	0	1	0	0	X	X	4
China (Liu)	4	0	1	0	2	0	3	1	X	X	11

Sheet C	1	2	3	4	5	6	7	8	9	10	Final
Chinese Taipei (Shen)	0	0	1	0	1	2	0	2	0	X	6
Japan (Tsuruga)	0	0	0	1	0	0	1	0	1	X	3

==== Draw 2 ====
Sunday, November 20, 10:00

Sheet B	1	2	3	4	5	6	7	8	9	10	Final
South Korea (Kim)	0	0	0	2	0	4	0	0	0	2	8
Chinese Taipei (Shen)	0	1	1	0	1	0	2	2	0	0	7

Sheet C	1	2	3	4	5	6	7	8	9	10	Final
New Zealand (de Boer)	1	0	0	0	0	0	0	X	X	X	1
China (Liu)	0	1	1	2	2	1	4	X	X	X	11

Sheet D	1	2	3	4	5	6	7	8	9	10	Final
Australia (Millikin)	3	1	1	0	0	1	0	2	0	1	9
Japan (Tsuruga)	0	0	0	3	1	0	1	0	2	0	7

==== Draw 3 ====
Sunday, November 20, 19:00

Sheet A	1	2	3	4	5	6	7	8	9	10	Final
Australia (Millikin)	0	0	0	0	2	0	1	1	1	X	5
Chinese Taipei (Shen)	0	0	1	0	0	2	0	0	0	X	3

Sheet B	1	2	3	4	5	6	7	8	9	10	11	Final
Japan (Tsuruga)	0	1	0	1	0	2	0	0	0	2	0	6
New Zealand (de Boer)	1	0	1	0	1	0	0	2	1	0	2	8

Sheet D	1	2	3	4	5	6	7	8	9	10	Final
South Korea (Kim)	2	0	1	0	2	0	0	2	0	2	9
China (Liu)	0	1	0	1	0	3	1	0	0	0	6

==== Draw 4 ====
Monday, November 21, 10:00

Sheet A	1	2	3	4	5	6	7	8	9	10	Final
South Korea (Kim)	3	2	3	0	2	0	X	X	X	X	10
Japan (Tsuruga)	0	0	0	2	0	2	X	X	X	X	4

Sheet C	1	2	3	4	5	6	7	8	9	10	Final
China (Liu)	2	0	0	0	2	0	0	6	X	X	10
Chinese Taipei (Shen)	0	0	0	1	0	1	0	0	X	X	2

Sheet D	1	2	3	4	5	6	7	8	9	10	Final
New Zealand (de Boer)	3	0	1	1	2	0	1	0	X	X	8
Australia (Millikin)	0	1	0	0	0	1	0	1	X	X	3

==== Draw 5 ====
Monday, November 21, 19:00

Sheet A	1	2	3	4	5	6	7	8	9	10	Final
Chinese Taipei (Shen)	1	0	3	0	0	0	1	0	3	X	8
New Zealand (de Boer)	0	1	0	0	1	1	0	2	0	X	5

Sheet B	1	2	3	4	5	6	7	8	9	10	Final
China (Liu)	1	0	0	2	0	2	0	1	0	X	6
Japan (Tsuruga)	0	0	1	0	1	0	1	0	1	X	4

Sheet C	1	2	3	4	5	6	7	8	9	10	Final
South Korea (Kim)	1	0	2	2	2	2	X	X	X	X	9
Australia (Millikin)	0	1	0	0	0	0	X	X	X	X	1

==== Draw 6 ====
Tuesday, November 22, 10:00

Sheet A	1	2	3	4	5	6	7	8	9	10	Final
China (Liu)	0	2	0	3	1	0	0	0	X	X	6
Australia (Millikin)	0	0	1	0	0	0	0	1	X	X	2

Sheet B	1	2	3	4	5	6	7	8	9	10	Final
South Korea (Kim)	1	0	1	0	1	0	1	0	1	0	5
New Zealand (de Boer)	0	1	0	1	0	1	0	2	0	1	6

Sheet D	1	2	3	4	5	6	7	8	9	10	Final
Japan (Tsuruga)	0	3	0	1	0	0	1	0	1	X	6
Chinese Taipei (Shen)	1	0	2	0	0	2	0	3	0	X	8

==== Draw 7 ====
Tuesday, November 22, 19:00

Sheet A	1	2	3	4	5	6	7	8	9	10	11	Final
Chinese Taipei (Shen)	0	1	0	2	0	2	1	0	0	0	0	6
South Korea (Kim)	1	0	1	0	1	0	0	1	1	1	3	9

Sheet C	1	2	3	4	5	6	7	8	9	10	Final
Japan (Tsuruga)	2	0	2	0	0	2	0	2	0	X	8
Australia (Millikin)	0	1	0	1	1	0	2	0	1	X	6

Sheet D	1	2	3	4	5	6	7	8	9	10	Final
China (Liu)	1	0	1	0	2	0	1	0	0	1	6
New Zealand (de Boer)	0	2	0	1	0	0	0	0	1	0	4

==== Draw 8 ====
Wednesday, November 23, 10:00

Sheet A	1	2	3	4	5	6	7	8	9	10	Final
New Zealand (de Boer)	1	2	2	0	2	0	X	X	X	X	7
Japan (Tsuruga)	0	0	0	1	0	1	X	X	X	X	2

Sheet B	1	2	3	4	5	6	7	8	9	10	Final
Chinese Taipei (Shen)	1	0	1	1	0	1	0	1	0	X	5
Australia (Millikin)	0	2	0	0	1	0	1	0	5	X	9

Sheet C	1	2	3	4	5	6	7	8	9	10	Final
China (Liu)	0	0	2	0	0	1	0	0	0	1	4
South Korea (Kim)	0	0	0	0	1	0	0	0	2	0	3

==== Draw 9 ====
Wednesday, November 23, 19:00

Sheet B	1	2	3	4	5	6	7	8	9	10	Final
Japan (Tsuruga)	3	0	1	1	0	2	0	1	0	X	8
South Korea (Kim)	0	2	0	0	3	0	4	0	3	X	12

Sheet C	1	2	3	4	5	6	7	8	9	10	Final
Australia (Millikin)	2	0	0	0	0	2	1	0	3	0	8
New Zealand (de Boer)	0	2	0	0	1	0	0	2	0	1	6

Sheet D	1	2	3	4	5	6	7	8	9	10	Final
Chinese Taipei (Shen)	0	2	2	0	0	0	0	1	0	X	5
China (Liu)	0	0	0	3	2	1	0	0	2	X	8

==== Draw 10 ====
Thursday, November 24, 14:30

Sheet A	1	2	3	4	5	6	7	8	9	10	Final
Japan (Tsuruga)	0	1	0	3	0	0	2	0	1	0	7
China (Liu)	1	0	2	0	1	0	0	3	0	1	8

Sheet B	1	2	3	4	5	6	7	8	9	10	Final
New Zealand (de Boer)	1	2	0	0	0	1	0	1	0	X	5
Chinese Taipei (Shen)	0	0	1	0	0	0	0	0	1	X	2

Sheet D	1	2	3	4	5	6	7	8	9	10	Final
Australia (Millikin)	0	1	0	1	0	2	0	1	0	1	6
South Korea (Kim)	1	0	1	0	2	0	0	0	1	0	5

=== Playoffs ===
Note: First two games of semifinals best-of-five are taken from round-robin games.

Semifinals
1	China	11	6	7	–	–
4	Australia	4	3	3	–	–
3	New Zealand	5	6	8	7	–
2	South Korea	9	5	2	5	–

Final
1	China	5
3	New Zealand	2
Bronze medal final
4	Australia	2
2	South Korea	9

==== Semifinals ====
===== Game 3 =====
Friday, November 25, 9:00

Sheet C	1	2	3	4	5	6	7	8	9	10	Final
China (Liu)	2	0	3	0	0	0	1	0	1	X	7
Australia (Millikin)	0	1	0	0	0	1	0	1	0	X	3

Sheet D	1	2	3	4	5	6	7	8	9	10	Final
New Zealand (de Boer)	0	0	1	2	0	2	3	0	X	X	8
South Korea (Kim)	0	0	0	0	1	0	0	1	X	X	2

===== Game 4 =====
Friday, November 25, 14:00

Sheet D	1	2	3	4	5	6	7	8	9	10	Final
New Zealand (de Boer)	1	0	1	0	3	1	0	0	0	1	7
South Korea (Kim)	0	2	0	1	0	0	0	1	1	0	5

==== Bronze Medal Game ====
Saturday, November 26, 12:00

Sheet D	1	2	3	4	5	6	7	8	9	10	Final
Australia (Millikin)	0	0	1	0	0	1	0	0	X	X	2
South Korea (Kim)	2	1	0	3	1	0	2	0	X	X	9

==== Gold Medal Game ====
Saturday, November 26, 12:00

Sheet C	1	2	3	4	5	6	7	8	9	10	Final
China (Liu)	2	1	0	0	0	0	0	0	1	1	5
New Zealand (de Boer)	0	0	0	1	0	1	0	0	0	0	2

== Women ==
=== Teams ===
China	Japan	South Korea	New Zealand
Skip: Wang Bingyu Third: Sun Yue; Second: Yue Qingshuang; Lead: Zhou Yan; Alternate: Liu Jinli; Coach: Zhang Wei	Skip: Satsuki Fujisawa Third: Miyo Ichikawa; Second: Emi Shimizu; Lead: Miyuki Satoh; Alternate: Chiaki Matsumura; Coaches: Hatomi Nagaoka, Shinya Abe	Skip: Kim Ji-sun Third: Lee Seul-bee; Second: Gim Un-chi; Lead: Lee Hyun-jung; Alternate: Shin Mi-sung; Coach: Choi Min-suk	Skip: Brydie Donald Third: Chelsea Farley; Second: Thivya Jeyaranjan; Lead: Natalie Campbell; Alternate: Tessa Farley; Coach: John Campbell

=== Round Robin Standings ===
Country	Skip	W	L
China	Wang Bingyu	5	1
South Korea	Kim Ji-sun	5	1
Japan	Satsuki Fujisawa	2	4
New Zealand	Brydie Donald	0	6

=== Round Robin Results ===
==== Draw 1 ====
Saturday, November 19, 19:00

Sheet A	1	2	3	4	5	6	7	8	9	10	Final
New Zealand (Donald)	0	0	1	0	1	0	0	X	X	X	2
Japan (Fujisawa)	0	2	0	2	0	2	2	X	X	X	8

Sheet B	1	2	3	4	5	6	7	8	9	10	Final
South Korea (Kim)	2	4	0	2	0	1	0	X	X	X	9
China (Wang)	0	0	1	0	2	0	1	X	X	X	4

==== Draw 2 ====
Sunday, November 20, 14:30

Sheet C	1	2	3	4	5	6	7	8	9	10	Final
New Zealand (Donald)	1	0	0	0	0	0	0	X	X	X	1
China (Wang)	0	1	1	2	2	1	4	X	X	X	11

Sheet D	1	2	3	4	5	6	7	8	9	10	Final
Japan (Fujisawa)	0	2	0	0	0	1	0	X	X	X	3
South Korea (Kim)	1	0	3	0	4	0	4	X	X	X	12

==== Draw 3 ====
Monday, November 21, 14:30

Sheet A	1	2	3	4	5	6	7	8	9	10	Final
Japan (Fujisawa)	1	0	0	0	1	1	0	1	0	X	4
China (Wang)	0	1	1	1	0	0	4	0	1	X	8

Sheet B	1	2	3	4	5	6	7	8	9	10	Final
New Zealand (Donald)	0	0	0	1	0	0	2	0	X	X	3
South Korea (Kim)	1	0	1	0	4	2	0	1	X	X	9

==== Draw 4 ====
Tuesday, November 22, 14:30

Sheet B	1	2	3	4	5	6	7	8	9	10	Final
Japan (Fujisawa)	3	0	2	0	3	1	X	X	X	X	9
New Zealand (Donald)	0	0	0	1	0	0	X	X	X	X	1

Sheet C	1	2	3	4	5	6	7	8	9	10	Final
China (Wang)	3	0	0	0	0	2	1	0	3	X	9
South Korea (Kim)	0	1	0	1	3	0	0	2	0	X	7

==== Draw 5 ====
Wednesday, November 23, 10:00

Sheet C	1	2	3	4	5	6	7	8	9	10	Final
South Korea (Kim)	0	2	0	2	0	0	1	0	2	X	7
Japan (Fujisawa)	0	0	1	0	2	1	0	1	0	X	5

Sheet D	1	2	3	4	5	6	7	8	9	10	Final
China (Wang)	2	0	0	2	1	1	0	2	0	X	8
New Zealand (Donald)	0	1	0	0	0	0	1	0	1	X	3

==== Draw 6 ====
Thursday, November 24, 10:00

Sheet A	1	2	3	4	5	6	7	8	9	10	Final
South Korea (Kim)	3	1	1	0	3	0	1	X	X	X	9
New Zealand (Donald)	0	0	0	1	0	0	0	X	X	X	1

Sheet B	1	2	3	4	5	6	7	8	9	10	Final
China (Wang)	0	2	0	0	1	0	3	0	0	1	7
Japan (Fujisawa)	1	0	1	1	0	2	0	0	1	0	6

=== Playoffs ===
Note: First two games of semifinals best-of-five are taken from round-robin games.

Semifinals
1	China	11	8	10	–	–
4	New Zealand	1	3	2	–	–
3	Japan	3	5	3	–	–
2	South Korea	12	7	10	–	–

Gold Medal Game
1	China	11
2	South Korea	3
Bronze Medal Game
4	New Zealand	8
3	Japan	4

==== Semifinals ====
===== Game 3 =====
Friday, November 25, 9:00

Sheet B	1	2	3	4	5	6	7	8	9	10	Final
China (Wang)	3	2	0	1	0	2	0	2	X	X	10
New Zealand (Donald)	0	0	0	0	1	0	1	0	X	X	2

Sheet A	1	2	3	4	5	6	7	8	9	10	Final
South Korea (Kim)	0	1	0	3	2	1	0	3	X	X	10
Japan (Fujisawa)	1	0	1	0	0	0	1	0	X	X	3

==== Bronze Medal Game ====
Saturday, November 26, 12:00

Sheet A	1	2	3	4	5	6	7	8	9	10	Final
New Zealand (Donald)	0	0	0	3	0	1	0	0	1	3	8
Japan (Fujisawa)	1	0	0	0	1	0	1	1	0	0	4

==== Gold Medal Game ====
Saturday, November 26, 12:00

Sheet B	1	2	3	4	5	6	7	8	9	10	Final
China (Wang)	2	3	2	0	3	0	1	0	X	X	11
South Korea (Kim)	0	0	0	1	0	1	0	1	X	X	3
