= Kim Chang-min =

South Korean curler (born 1985)

- Curler
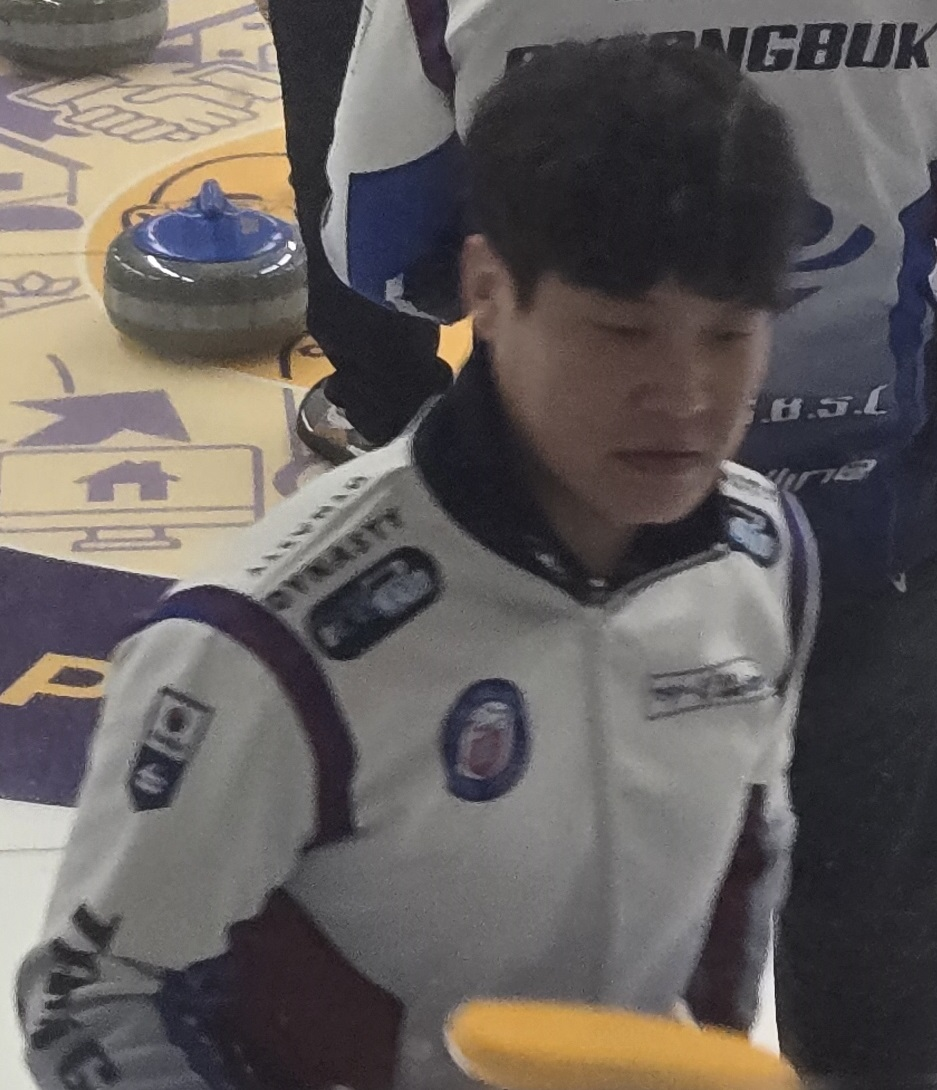
- Kim at the 2025 Capital Curling Fall Open
- Born: September 4, 1985 (age 41); Uiseong County, South Korea

Team
- Curling club: Uiseong CC, Uiseong; Gyeongsangbukdo Sports Council
- Skip: Kim Soo-hyuk
- Third: Kim Chang-min
- Second: Yoo Min-hyeon
- Lead: Shin Eun-jin
- Mixed doubles partner: Kim Su-jin

Curling career
- Member Association: South Korea
- World Championship: 4 (2018, 2022, 2025, 2026)
- Pacific-Asia Championship: 7 (1998, 2009, 2011, 2012, 2017, 2019, 2021)
- Pan Continental Championship: 1 (2025)
- Olympic: 1 (2018)
Medal record
Men's curling
Representing South Korea
Pacific-Asia Championships
Gold medal – first place	2017 Erina
Gold medal – first place	2019 Shenzhen
Gold medal – first place	2021 Almaty
Bronze medal – third place	2009 Karuizawa
Bronze medal – third place	2011 Nanjing
Winter Universiade
Gold medal – first place	2011 Erzurum
Pacific Junior Championships
Gold medal – first place	2005 Tokoro
Silver medal – second place	2007 Naseby
Bronze medal – third place	2006 Beijing
Representing Uiseong
Korean Men's Championship
Gold medal – first place	2011 Uijeongbu
Gold medal – first place	2012 Uijeongbu
Gold medal – first place	2017 Icheon
Gold medal – first place	2019 Gangneung
Gold medal – first place	2021 Gangneung
Gold medal – first place	2025 Uijeongbu
Silver medal – second place	2013 Chuncheon
Silver medal – second place	2016 Uiseong
Silver medal – second place	2020 Gangneung
Silver medal – second place	2022 Jincheon
Silver medal – second place	2026 Uiseong
Bronze medal – third place	2023 Gangneung
Bronze medal – third place	2024 Uijeongbu

Kim Chang-min (born September 4, 1985, in Uiseong County) is a South Korean curler. Kim was the skip of the South Korean men's team at the 2018 Winter Olympics.

== Career ==
=== Juniors ===
Kim's curling career began quickly, with a trip to the 1998 Pacific Curling Championships in just his first year of curling. Kim played third for the Korean team, which was skipped by Song He-dong. The team was outmatched in the tournament, and they would go winless in six games.

With a few more years of experience, Kim would play on the Korean junior men's team, going to the World Junior Curling Championships in 2004, 2005 and 2006. At the 2004 World Junior Curling Championships, Kim played third for skip Kim Soo-hyuk. After a 5-4 round robin record, the team beat Canada in a tiebreaker match to make the playoffs. There, the team would lose in both the semifinal and the bronze medal final, settling for fourth place. At the 2005 World Junior Curling Championships, the team found less success, finishing the round robin with a 2–7 record, and missed the playoffs. At the 2006 World Junior Curling Championships, Kim was promoted to skip the Korean team. He led his rink of Kim Min-chan, Park Jong-duk, Park Jin-oh and Choi Byung-rok to a 4–5 record, again missing the playoffs.

During his junior career, Kim won a gold medal at the 2005 Pacific Junior Curling Championships, a silver medal in 2007 and a bronze medal in 2006.

Kim has played in four Winter Universiades for the Korean team, while attending Andong National University. Kim skipped the team in all four of his appearances. He won the gold medal at the 2011 Winter Universiade with teammates Kim Min-chan, Seong Se-hyeon, Seo Young-seon and Oh Eun-su. He would lead Korea to a fourth-place finish at the 2009 Winter Universiade, fifth place at the 2007 Winter Universiade and 8th place at the 2013 Winter Universiade.

=== Men's ===
After a premature trip in 1998, Kim returned to the Pacific Curling Championships in 2009. Kim skipped the Korean team of Kim Min-chan, Lim Myung-sup, Jeong Tac-yeon and Seong Se-hyeon to a bronze medal. Kim returned to the event in 2011, which was renamed to the Pacific-Asia Championships. He skipped the Korean team of Kim Min-chan, Seong Se-hyeon, Seo Young-seon and Oh Eun-su to another bronze medal. Kim also skipped the Korean team at the 2012 Pacific-Asia Curling Championships. He would be less successful there, as his team would finish in 4th place.

On the World Curling Tour, Kim won two events early in his career, the 2013 Original 16 WCT Bonspiel and the 2016 KKP Classic.

Kim and his rink of Seong, Oh, and Lee Ki-bok were named as South Korea's Olympic team for the 2018 Winter Olympics. In their Olympic season, the team won the 2017 Pacific-Asia Curling Championships and were the runners-up in their first career Grand Slam of Curling event, the 2017 Boost National. They became the first Asian based team to make it to a men's Grand Slam final.

Kim and his rink won the 2019 Korean Curling Championships in July 2019. To begin the 2019–20 season, Kim and his team of Lee Ki-jeong, Kim Hak-kyun and Lee Ki-bok finished runner-up at the 2019 Cameron's Brewing Oakville Fall Classic. Kim skipped the South Korean national men's team to a gold medal at the 2019 Pacific-Asia Curling Championships following a perfect 11–0 record through the tournament. That season, the team also won the 2019 China Open on the tour. The team was supposed to represent South Korea at the 2020 World Men's Curling Championship, but it was cancelled due to the COVID-19 pandemic.

After finishing second in 2020, Kim won the Korean national championship again in 2021, with his new teammates Kim Soo-hyuk throwing last rocks, Jeon Jae-ik throwing second, and Kim Hak-kyun playing lead. On the Tour, they won the Avonair event of the Alberta Curling Series and the Kamloops Crown of Curling, and played in the season ending Champions Cup Grand Slam event, where they failed to qualify for the playoffs. He led the Korean team to a 5–1 round robin record at the 2021 Pacific-Asia Curling Championships, and won both their playoff games to claim the gold medal. A month later, the team faltered at the Olympic Qualification event, missing the playoffs with a 2–6 record. The team represented South Korea at the 2022 World Men's Curling Championship (with Seong Se-hyeon throwing second in place if Jeon), where he led Korea to a 6–6 record. Seong remained as the team's second for the remainder of the season.

== Grand Slam record ==
Key
C	Champion
F	Lost in Final
SF	Lost in Semifinal
QF	Lost in Quarterfinals
R16	Lost in the round of 16
Q	Did not advance to playoffs
T2	Played in Tier 2 event
DNP	Did not participate in event
N/A	Not a Grand Slam event that season

Event	2017–18	2018–19	2019–20	2020–21	2021–22	2022–23
The National	F	DNP	DNP	N/A	DNP	DNP
Tour Challenge	DNP	DNP	DNP	N/A	N/A	T2
Canadian Open	Q	DNP	N/A	N/A	DNP	DNP
Champions Cup	DNP	DNP	N/A	DNP	Q	DNP
