= 2012 Pacific-Asia Curling Championships =

- Host city: Naseby, New Zealand
- Arena: Naseby Curling Club
- Dates: November 18–25
- Men's winner: China
- Skip: Liu Rui
- Third: Xu Xiaoming
- Second: Zang Jialiang
- Lead: Ba Dexin
- Alternate: Zou Dejia
- Finalist: Japan (Yusuke Morozumi)
- Women's winner: China
- Skip: Wang Bingyu
- Third: Liu Yin
- Second: Yue Qingshuang
- Lead: Zhou Yan
- Alternate: Liu Jinli
- Finalist: Japan (Satsuki Fujisawa)

The 2012 Pacific-Asia Curling Championships were held from November 18 to 25 at the Naseby Curling Club in Naseby, New Zealand. The championships acted as the Pacific zone qualifiers for the World Curling Championships. The top two women's berths, China and Japan, qualified for the 2013 World Women's Curling Championship in Riga, Latvia, while the top two men's berths, China and Japan, qualified for the 2013 World Men's Curling Championship in Victoria, British Columbia.

== Competition format ==
This edition of the Pacific-Asia Curling Championships will have a different competition format from previous Pacific-Asia Curling Championships, per World Curling Federation regulations. The men's tournament will have seven teams competing in a single round-robin format, while the women's tournament will have six teams competing in a double round-robin format. At the conclusion of the round robin tournaments, the top four men's and women's teams will play in the semifinals. The semifinal rounds will be best-of-three games for the men and best-of-five games for the women. For the men's semifinals, the game that the teams played in the round robin will be counted as the first game in the best-of-three series, while for the women's semifinals, the two games that the teams played in the round robin will be counted as the first and second games in the best-of-five series. The medal round, as in previous years, will consist of single games.

== Men ==
=== Teams ===
The teams are listed as follows:

Australia	China	Chinese Taipei	Japan
Fourth: Ian Palangio Skip: Hugh Millikin; Second: Sean Hall; Lead: Stephen Johns; Alternate: Angus Young	Skip: Liu Rui Third: Xu Xiaoming; Second: Zang Jialiang; Lead: Ba Dexin; Alternate: Zou Dejia	Skip: Randolph Shen Third: Brendon Liu; Second: Nicholas Hsu; Lead: Justin Hsu; Alternate: Steve Koo	Skip: Yusuke Morozumi Third: Tsuyoshi Yamaguchi; Second: Tetsuro Shimizu; Lead: Kosuke Morozumi; Alternate: Yoshiro Shimizu
Kazakhstan	New Zealand	South Korea	
Fourth: Alexandr Orlov Skip: Viktor Kim; Second: Daniel Alex Kim; Lead: Ilya Kuznetsov; Alternate: Marat Smailov	Skip: Peter de Boer Third: Sean Becker; Second: Scott Becker; Lead: Kenny Thomson; Alternate: Philip Dowling	Skip: Kim Chang-min Third: Kim Min-chan; Second: Seong Se-hyeon; Lead: Seo Young-seon; Alternate: Oh Eun-su	

=== Round-robin standings ===
Final round-robin standings

Country	Skip	W	L
China	Liu Rui	5	1
South Korea	Kim Chang-min	5	1
Japan	Yusuke Morozumi	4	2
Australia	Hugh Millikin	4	2
Chinese Taipei	Randolph Shen	2	4
New Zealand	Peter de Boer	1	5
Kazakhstan	Viktor Kim	0	6

=== Round-robin results ===
All draw times listed in New Zealand Standard Time (UTC+12).

==== Draw 2 ====
Sunday, November 18, 14:00

Sheet A	1	2	3	4	5	6	7	8	9	10	Final
China (Liu) 🔨	0	0	2	0	0	2	0	0	1	3	8
Japan (Morozumi)	0	0	0	1	0	0	0	2	0	0	3

Sheet B	1	2	3	4	5	6	7	8	9	10	Final
New Zealand (de Boer)	0	0	0	0	0	1	0	1	2	0	4
Chinese Taipei (Shen) 🔨	0	0	0	2	0	0	1	0	0	2	5

Sheet C	1	2	3	4	5	6	7	8	9	10	Final
Australia (Millikin) 🔨	1	0	0	1	0	1	2	0	3	0	8
South Korea (C. Kim)	0	1	1	0	3	0	0	2	0	2	9

==== Draw 5 ====
Monday, November 19, 14:00

Sheet A	1	2	3	4	5	6	7	8	9	10	Final
Australia (Millikin) 🔨	0	2	1	0	1	0	0	0	0	1	5
Chinese Taipei (Shen)	1	0	0	1	0	1	0	1	0	0	4

Sheet B	1	2	3	4	5	6	7	8	9	10	Final
Kazakhstan (V. Kim) 🔨	0	2	0	1	0	0	1	0	0	X	4
China (Liu)	2	0	3	0	0	2	0	0	1	X	8

Sheet C	1	2	3	4	5	6	7	8	9	10	Final
Japan (Morozumi)	0	2	1	4	0	0	0	1	0	X	8
New Zealand (de Boer) 🔨	2	0	0	0	1	0	1	0	1	X	5

==== Draw 7 ====
Tuesday, November 20, 9:30

Sheet A	1	2	3	4	5	6	7	8	9	10	Final
Kazakhstan (V. Kim)	0	1	0	1	0	1	X	X	X	X	3
New Zealand (de Boer) 🔨	2	0	2	0	4	0	X	X	X	X	8

Sheet B	1	2	3	4	5	6	7	8	9	10	Final
Japan (Morozumi)	0	0	0	2	0	2	2	0	1	0	7
Australia (Millikin) 🔨	0	1	1	0	2	0	0	1	0	1	6

Sheet C	1	2	3	4	5	6	7	8	9	10	Final
South Korea (C. Kim) 🔨	0	1	1	0	2	0	0	2	0	1	7
Chinese Taipei (Shen)	2	0	0	1	0	1	0	0	2	0	6

==== Draw 9 ====
Tuesday, November 20, 19:00

Sheet B	1	2	3	4	5	6	7	8	9	10	Final
South Korea (C. Kim)	0	1	0	2	1	0	0	1	0	4	9
New Zealand (de Boer) 🔨	2	0	1	0	0	0	0	0	1	0	4

Sheet C	1	2	3	4	5	6	7	8	9	10	Final
Kazakhstan (V. Kim)	0	1	0	0	1	0	1	0	1	X	4
Japan (Morozumi) 🔨	1	0	4	0	0	2	0	2	0	X	9

Sheet D	1	2	3	4	5	6	7	8	9	10	Final
Chinese Taipei (Shen)	0	0	0	1	0	1	0	1	X	X	3
China (Liu) 🔨	0	0	1	0	2	0	4	0	X	X	7

==== Draw 11 ====
Wednesday, November 21, 14:00

Sheet B	1	2	3	4	5	6	7	8	9	10	Final
Australia (Millikin)	2	1	2	0	1	0	1	0	0	X	7
Kazakhstan (V. Kim)	0	0	0	1	0	1	0	0	1	X	3

Sheet C	1	2	3	4	5	6	7	8	9	10	Final
New Zealand (de Boer)	0	0	2	1	0	2	0	0	0	0	5
China (Liu)	0	0	0	0	2	0	2	0	1	1	6

Sheet D	1	2	3	4	5	6	7	8	9	10	Final
Japan (Morozumi)	0	0	1	0	1	0	0	2	0	X	4
South Korea (C. Kim)	2	1	0	1	0	1	1	0	1	X	7

==== Draw 14 ====
Thursday, November 22, 14:00

Sheet B	1	2	3	4	5	6	7	8	9	10	Final
China (Liu)	0	0	2	1	0	1	0	2	0	X	6
South Korea (C. Kim) 🔨	0	2	0	0	1	0	1	0	0	X	4

Sheet C	1	2	3	4	5	6	7	8	9	10	Final
Chinese Taipei (Shen) 🔨	2	0	2	1	0	4	2	0	4	X	15
Kazakhstan (V. Kim)	0	1	0	0	1	0	0	2	0	X	4

Sheet D	1	2	3	4	5	6	7	8	9	10	Final
New Zealand (de Boer)	0	0	0	0	0	1	0	X	X	X	1
Australia (Millikin) 🔨	0	1	0	4	1	0	2	X	X	X	8

==== Draw 16 ====
Friday, November 23, 9:30

Sheet A	1	2	3	4	5	6	7	8	9	10	Final
South Korea (C. Kim) 🔨	2	4	1	4	0	4	X	X	X	X	15
Kazakhstan (V. Kim)	0	0	0	0	2	0	X	X	X	X	2

Sheet B	1	2	3	4	5	6	7	8	9	10	11	Final
Chinese Taipei (Shen)	0	1	0	0	2	0	0	0	0	2	0	5
Japan (Morozumi) 🔨	2	0	2	0	0	1	0	0	0	0	2	7

Sheet C	1	2	3	4	5	6	7	8	9	10	Final
China (Liu)	0	0	0	2	0	2	0	0	1	0	5
Australia (Millikin) 🔨	0	1	0	0	3	0	1	0	0	1	6

=== Playoffs ===
Semifinals
1	China	5	8	8
4	Australia	6	3	3
2	South Korea	7	4	4
3	Japan	4	8	9

Gold-medal game
1	China	6
3	Japan	2
Bronze-medal game
4	Australia	10
2	South Korea	7

==== Semifinals ====
===== Game 2 =====
Saturday, November 24, 9:00

Sheet A	1	2	3	4	5	6	7	8	9	10	Final
China (Liu)	0	2	2	0	2	0	2	0	X	X	8
Australia (Millikin) 🔨	0	0	0	1	0	1	0	1	X	X	3

Sheet B	1	2	3	4	5	6	7	8	9	10	Final
South Korea (C. Kim) 🔨	2	0	0	0	0	0	1	0	1	0	4
Japan (Morozumi)	0	1	0	1	0	2	0	2	0	2	8

===== Game 3 =====
Saturday, November 24, 14:00

Sheet A	1	2	3	4	5	6	7	8	9	10	Final
South Korea (C. Kim)	0	1	1	0	1	0	1	0	X	X	4
Japan (Morozumi) 🔨	2	0	0	4	0	3	0	0	X	X	9

Sheet B	1	2	3	4	5	6	7	8	9	10	Final
China (Liu)	0	0	2	0	0	2	1	0	3	X	8
Australia (Millikin) 🔨	0	1	0	0	1	0	0	1	0	X	3

==== Bronze-medal game ====
Sunday, November 25, 14:00

Sheet B	1	2	3	4	5	6	7	8	9	10	Final
Australia (Millikin)	3	0	0	2	1	0	3	0	0	1	10
South Korea (C. Kim) 🔨	0	2	1	0	0	2	0	1	1	0	7

==== Gold-medal game ====
Sunday, November 25, 14:00

Sheet C	1	2	3	4	5	6	7	8	9	10	Final
China (Liu) 🔨	0	1	1	0	1	0	2	0	1	X	6
Japan (Morozumi)	0	0	0	1	0	1	0	0	0	X	2

== Women ==
=== Teams ===
The teams are listed as follows:

Australia	China	Japan
Fourth: Laurie Weeden Skip: Kim Forge; Second: Lyn Gill; Lead: Blair Murray	Skip: Wang Bingyu Third: Liu Yin; Second: Yue Qingshuang; Lead: Zhou Yan; Alternate: Liu Jinli	Skip: Satsuki Fujisawa Third: Miyo Ichikawa; Second: Emi Shimizu; Lead: Chiaki Matsumura; Alternate: Miyuki Satoh
Kazakhstan	New Zealand	South Korea
Skip: Olga Ten Third: Olga Zaitseva; Second: Nadira Yunussova; Lead: Marina Pestryakova; Alternate: Jane Olga Kim	Skip: Bridget Becker Third: Brydie Donald; Second: Marisa Jones; Lead: Kelsi Heath; Alternate: Thivya Jeyaranjan	Skip: Kim Eun-jung Third: Kim Kyeong-ae; Second: Kim Seon-yeong; Lead: Kim Yeong-mi; Alternate: Kim Min-jung

=== Round-robin standings ===
Final round-robin standings

Country	Skip	W	L
China	Wang Bingyu	9	1
South Korea	Kim Eun-jung	8	2
Japan	Satsuki Fujisawa	6	4
Australia	Kim Forge	3	7
New Zealand	Bridget Becker	3	7
Kazakhstan	Olga Ten	1	9

=== Round-robin results ===
All draw times listed in New Zealand Standard Time (UTC+12).

==== Draw 1 ====
Sunday, November 18, 9:30

Sheet A	1	2	3	4	5	6	7	8	9	10	Final
New Zealand (Becker) 🔨	2	0	0	1	0	1	0	0	0	X	4
South Korea (Kim)	0	0	1	0	2	0	2	2	1	X	8

Sheet B	1	2	3	4	5	6	7	8	9	10	Final
Australia (Forge) 🔨	0	1	0	0	1	0	X	X	X	X	2
China (Wang)	2	0	3	2	0	4	X	X	X	X	11

Sheet C	1	2	3	4	5	6	7	8	9	10	Final
Kazakhstan (Ten) 🔨	0	1	0	0	0	1	0	X	X	X	2
Japan (Fujisawa)	3	0	3	2	2	0	0	X	X	X	10

==== Draw 3 ====
Sunday, November 18, 19:00

Sheet B	1	2	3	4	5	6	7	8	9	10	Final
South Korea (Kim) 🔨	1	5	0	1	2	2	X	X	X	X	11
Kazakhstan (Ten)	0	0	1	0	0	0	X	X	X	X	1

Sheet C	1	2	3	4	5	6	7	8	9	10	Final
New Zealand (Becker) 🔨	0	1	0	1	0	0	0	X	X	X	2
China (Wang)	1	0	1	0	3	3	2	X	X	X	10

Sheet D	1	2	3	4	5	6	7	8	9	10	Final
Australia (Forge) 🔨	0	0	1	0	0	3	1	0	1	X	6
Japan (Fujisawa)	1	3	0	4	0	0	0	3	0	X	11

==== Draw 4 ====
Monday, November 19, 9:30

Sheet A	1	2	3	4	5	6	7	8	9	10	Final
Australia (Forge) 🔨	0	0	0	2	0	0	3	2	0	0	W
Kazakhstan (Ten)	1	1	1	0	1	3	0	0	2	X	L

Game forfeited by Kazakhstan due to time expiry. Kazakhstan had been leading 9–7 at the time.

Sheet B	1	2	3	4	5	6	7	8	9	10	Final
Japan (Fujisawa) 🔨	1	0	2	2	0	0	0	2	2	X	9
New Zealand (Becker)	0	1	0	0	1	0	0	0	0	X	2

Sheet D	1	2	3	4	5	6	7	8	9	10	Final
South Korea (Kim) 🔨	1	0	0	0	1	0	1	0	2	0	6
China (Wang)	0	1	0	2	0	2	0	1	0	1	7

==== Draw 6 ====
Monday, November 19, 19:00

Sheet A	1	2	3	4	5	6	7	8	9	10	Final
South Korea (Kim) 🔨	2	1	0	0	0	1	0	0	3	X	7
Japan (Fujisawa)	0	0	1	2	0	0	0	1	0	X	4

Sheet C	1	2	3	4	5	6	7	8	9	10	Final
China (Wang) 🔨	4	0	5	0	0	3	X	X	X	X	12
Kazakhstan (Ten)	0	1	0	1	1	0	X	X	X	X	3

Sheet D	1	2	3	4	5	6	7	8	9	10	Final
New Zealand (Becker) 🔨	0	0	3	0	0	0	1	0	1	X	5
Australia (Forge)	3	1	0	1	1	2	0	1	0	X	9

==== Draw 8 ====
Tuesday, November 20, 14:00

Sheet A	1	2	3	4	5	6	7	8	9	10	Final
Kazakhstan (Ten) 🔨	0	1	1	0	0	0	0	1	X	X	3
New Zealand (Becker)	2	0	0	2	2	4	1	0	X	X	11

Sheet B	1	2	3	4	5	6	7	8	9	10	Final
China (Wang) 🔨	1	0	2	0	1	3	0	1	X	X	8
Japan (Fujisawa)	0	1	0	0	0	0	1	0	X	X	2

Sheet C	1	2	3	4	5	6	7	8	9	10	Final
South Korea (Kim) 🔨	1	0	4	0	0	1	1	1	0	X	8
Australia (Forge)	0	1	0	1	1	0	0	0	1	X	4

==== Draw 10 ====
Wednesday, November 21, 9:30

Sheet A	1	2	3	4	5	6	7	8	9	10	Final
China (Wang) 🔨	4	2	1	0	3	0	X	X	X	X	10
Australia (Forge)	0	0	0	2	0	1	X	X	X	X	3

Sheet B	1	2	3	4	5	6	7	8	9	10	11	Final
South Korea (Kim) 🔨	2	0	0	0	2	0	2	0	0	0	2	8
New Zealand (Becker)	0	0	2	2	0	1	0	1	1	1	0	6

Sheet D	1	2	3	4	5	6	7	8	9	10	Final
Japan (Fujisawa) 🔨	0	0	0	2	1	1	0	0	4	0	8
Kazakhstan (Ten)	1	1	1	0	0	0	1	3	0	2	9

==== Draw 12 ====
Wednesday, November 21, 19:00

Sheet A	1	2	3	4	5	6	7	8	9	10	Final
Kazakhstan (Ten) 🔨	0	0	0	0	0	0	1	X	X	X	1
South Korea (Kim)	1	1	1	1	1	3	0	X	X	X	8

Sheet C	1	2	3	4	5	6	7	8	9	10	Final
Japan (Fujisawa) 🔨	3	2	0	1	0	1	1	0	3	X	11
Australia (Forge)	0	0	1	0	1	0	0	1	0	X	3

Sheet D	1	2	3	4	5	6	7	8	9	10	Final
China (Wang) 🔨	2	0	1	0	3	1	0	3	X	X	10
New Zealand (Becker)	0	1	0	0	0	0	1	0	X	X	2

==== Draw 13 ====
Thursday, November 22, 9:30

Sheet A	1	2	3	4	5	6	7	8	9	10	Final
New Zealand (Becker) 🔨	1	0	0	0	1	0	2	0	1	0	5
Japan (Fujisawa)	0	0	1	3	0	1	0	1	0	1	7

Sheet B	1	2	3	4	5	6	7	8	9	10	11	Final
Kazakhstan (Ten) 🔨	0	3	0	1	0	2	0	0	2	0	0	8
Australia (Forge)	2	0	1	0	2	0	1	1	0	1	1	9

Sheet C	1	2	3	4	5	6	7	8	9	10	Final
China (Wang) 🔨	0	0	2	0	1	0	2	0	1	0	6
South Korea (Kim)	0	1	0	1	0	4	0	1	0	1	8

==== Draw 15 ====
Thursday, November 22, 19:00

Sheet B	1	2	3	4	5	6	7	8	9	10	Final
Japan (Fujisawa) 🔨	1	0	1	1	1	0	0	1	0	1	6
South Korea (Kim)	0	1	0	0	0	1	0	0	1	0	3

Sheet C	1	2	3	4	5	6	7	8	9	10	Final
Australia (Forge) 🔨	1	0	0	0	0	1	0	2	0	X	4
New Zealand (Becker)	0	1	2	1	1	0	1	0	3	X	9

Sheet D	1	2	3	4	5	6	7	8	9	10	Final
Kazakhstan (Ten) 🔨	0	1	0	0	1	0	1	0	X	X	3
China (Wang)	2	0	3	1	0	1	0	4	X	X	11

==== Draw 17 ====
Friday, November 23, 14:00

Sheet A	1	2	3	4	5	6	7	8	9	10	Final
Japan (Fujisawa) 🔨	1	0	3	0	0	1	0	0	0	1	6
China (Wang)	0	1	0	1	1	0	2	0	3	0	8

Sheet B	1	2	3	4	5	6	7	8	9	10	Final
New Zealand (Becker) 🔨	1	0	3	0	5	0	0	1	X	X	10
Kazakhstan (Ten)	0	2	0	1	0	1	1	0	X	X	5

Sheet D	1	2	3	4	5	6	7	8	9	10	Final
Australia (Forge) 🔨	0	0	1	0	1	0	0	X	X	X	2
South Korea (Kim)	1	1	0	4	0	1	2	X	X	X	9

==== Tiebreaker ====
Friday, November 23, 18:30

Sheet A	1	2	3	4	5	6	7	8	9	10	Final
New Zealand (Becker) 🔨	0	2	0	2	0	1	0	0	1	0	6
Australia (Forge)	1	0	1	0	1	0	3	1	0	1	8

=== Playoffs ===
Semifinals
1	China	11	10	6	–	–
4	Australia	2	3	4	–	–
2	South Korea	7	3	4	3	–
3	Japan	4	6	9	7	–

Gold-medal game
1	China	10
3	Japan	4
Bronze-medal game
4	Australia	3
2	South Korea	9

==== Semifinals ====
===== Game 3 =====
Saturday, November 24, 9:00

Sheet C	1	2	3	4	5	6	7	8	9	10	Final
China (Wang) 🔨	1	1	0	1	1	0	1	1	0	X	6
Australia (Forge)	0	0	1	0	0	1	0	0	2	X	4

Sheet D	1	2	3	4	5	6	7	8	9	10	Final
South Korea (Kim) 🔨	1	0	0	1	0	1	0	1	X	X	4
Japan (Fujisawa)	0	3	1	0	2	0	3	0	X	X	9

===== Game 4 =====
Saturday, November 24, 14:00

Sheet C	1	2	3	4	5	6	7	8	9	10	Final
South Korea (Kim)	0	1	0	0	1	0	1	0	0	X	3
Japan (Fujisawa) 🔨	2	0	1	1	0	1	0	1	1	X	7

==== Bronze-medal game ====
Sunday, November 25, 9:30

Sheet B	1	2	3	4	5	6	7	8	9	10	Final
Australia (Forge)	0	1	0	0	0	1	1	0	X	X	3
South Korea (Kim) 🔨	2	0	2	0	1	0	0	4	X	X	9

==== Gold-medal game ====
Sunday, November 25, 9:30

Sheet C	1	2	3	4	5	6	7	8	9	10	Final
China (Wang) 🔨	1	0	0	2	0	4	0	3	X	X	10
Japan (Fujisawa)	0	0	2	0	1	0	1	0	X	X	4
