= Kim Min-chan =

South Korean curler

- Curler
- Born: February 26, 1987 (age 39)

Team
- Curling club: Uiseong CC, Uiseong; Gyeongsangbukdo Sports Council

Curling career
- Member Association: South Korea
- World Championship: 1 (2018)
- Pacific-Asia Championship: 4 (2009, 2011, 2012, 2017)
- Olympic: 1 (2018)
Medal record
Men's curling
Representing South Korea
Pacific-Asia Championships
Gold medal – first place	2017 Erina
Bronze medal – third place	2009 Karuizawa
Bronze medal – third place	2011 Nanjing
Winter Universiade
Gold medal – first place	2011 Erzurum
Pacific Junior Championships
Silver medal – second place	2007 Naseby
Bronze medal – third place	2006 Beijing
Representing Uiseong
Korean Men's Championship
Gold medal – first place	2011 Uijeongbu
Gold medal – first place	2012 Uijeongbu
Gold medal – first place	2017 Icheon
Silver medal – second place	2013 Chuncheon
Silver medal – second place	2014 Chongju
Bronze medal – third place	2015 Icheon
Representing Seoul
Korean Mixed Doubles Championship
Bronze medal – third place	2018 Jincheon
Bronze medal – third place	2019 Gangneung

Kim Min-chan (born February 26, 1987) is a South Korean curler. He competed in the 2018 Winter Olympics as the alternate on the South Korean men's team skipped by Kim Chang-min.

== Personal life ==
His sister is Kim Min-jung, Team Kim's former coach.
