= Kenny Thomson (curler) =

New Zealand male curler

- Curler
- Born: 27 March 1969 (age 57)

Team
- Curling club: Auckland CC, Auckland
- Skip: Peter de Boer
- Third: Kenny Thomson
- Second: Gordon Hay
- Lead: Phil Dowling

Curling career
- Member Association: New Zealand
- World Championship: 1 (2012)
- World Mixed Doubles Championship: 1 (2014)
- Pacific-Asia Championship: 5 (2010, 2011, 2012, 2013, 2014)
Medal record
Curling
Pacific Championships
Silver medal – second place	2011 Nanjing
New Zealand Men's Championship
Gold medal – first place	2016 Naseby
Silver medal – second place	2009 Dunedin
Silver medal – second place	2010 Naseby
Silver medal – second place	2011 Naseby
Silver medal – second place	2012 Naseby
Silver medal – second place	2018 Naseby
Bronze medal – third place	2008 Naseby
Bronze medal – third place	2013 Dunedin
Bronze medal – third place	2014 Naseby
Bronze medal – third place	2023 Naseby

Kenny Thomson (born 27 March 1969) is a New Zealand curler.

At the international level, he is a 2011 Pacific-Asian silver medallist.

At the national level, he is a 2016 New Zealand men's champion curler and a 2010 New Zealand mixed champion.

== Teams ==
=== Men's ===
Season	Skip	Third	Second	Lead	Alternate	Coach	Events
2007–08	Dan Mustapic	Kenny Thomson	Peter de Boer	Haymon Keeler	Lorne De Pape		NZMCC 2008 (bronze)
2008–09	Dan Mustapic	Hans Frauenlob	Kenny Thomson	Lorne De Pape			NZMCC 2009 (silver)
2009–10	Dan Mustapic	Kenny Thomson	Lorne De Pape	Doug Charko			NZMCC 2010 (silver)
2010–11	Sean Becker	Warren Kearney	Kris Miller	Warren Dobson	Kenny Thomson	Peter Becker	PCC 2010 (4th)
2010–11	Peter de Boer	Kenny Thomson	Kris Miller	Iain Craig			NZMCC 2011 (silver)
2011–12	Peter de Boer	Sean Becker	Scott Becker	Kenny Thomson	Phil Dowling (PACC, WCC)	Peter Becker (PACC, WCC)	PACC 2011 (silver); NZMCC 2012 (silver); WCC 2012 (5th)
2012–13	Peter de Boer	Sean Becker	Scott Becker	Kenny Thomson	Phil Dowling (PACC)	Peter Becker (PACC)	PACC 2012 (6th); NZMCC 2013 (bronze)
2013–14	Peter de Boer	Sean Becker	Scott Becker	Kenny Thomson	Phil Dowling	Peter Becker	PACC 2013 (4th); OQE 2013 (5th)
2013–14	Kenny Thomson	Peter de Boer	Warren Dobson	Phil Dowling			NZMCC 2014 (bronze)
2014–15	Scott Becker (fourth)	Kenny Thomson (skip)	Rupert Jones	Warren Dobson	Brett Sargon		
2015–16	Peter de Boer	Brett Sargon	Kenny Thomson	Phil Dowling			NZMCC 2016 (gold)
2017–18	Peter de Boer	Kenny Thomson	Phil Dowling	Iain Craig			NZMCC 2018 (silver)
2023–24	Peter de Boer	Kenny Thomson	Gordon Hay	Phil Dowling			NZMCC 2023 (bronze)

=== Mixed ===
Season	Skip	Third	Second	Lead	Alternate	Events
2009–10	Kenny Thomson	Brydie Donald	Lorne De Pape	Marisa Jones		NZMxCC 2010 (gold)
2012–13	Brett Sargon (fourth)	Kenny Thomson	Eleanor Adviento (skip)	Robert Giles	Beth Gibbs	NZMxCC 2013 (4th)

=== Mixed doubles ===
Season	Male	Female	Coach	Events
2012–13	Kenny Thomson	Waverley Taylor		NZMDCC 2013 (silver)
2013–14	Kenny Thomson	Waverley Taylor	Peter Taylor	WMDCC 2014 (21st); NZMDCC 2014 (bronze)
