= Oh Eun-su =

South Korean curler

- Curler
- Born: January 4, 1993 (age 33); Gumi, Gyeongsangbuk-do, South Korea

Team
- Curling club: Uiseong CC, Uiseong; Gyeongsangbukdo Sports Council

Curling career
- Member Association: South Korea
- World Championship: 1 (2018)
- Pacific-Asia Championship: 3 (2011, 2012, 2017)
- Olympic: 1 (2018)
Medal record
Men's curling
Representing South Korea
Pacific-Asia Championships
Gold medal – first place	2017 Erina
Bronze medal – third place	2011 Nanjing
Winter Universiade
Gold medal – first place	2011 Erzurum
Representing Uiseong
Korean Men's Championship
Gold medal – first place	2011 Uijeongbu
Gold medal – first place	2012 Uijeongbu
Gold medal – first place	2017 Icheon
Silver medal – second place	2013 Chuncheon
Silver medal – second place	2014 Chongju
Silver medal – second place	2016 Uiseong
Bronze medal – third place	2015 Icheon

- Oh Eun-su
- Hangul: 오은수
- RR: O Eunsu
- MR: O Ŭnsu

Oh Eun-su (born January 4, 1993) is a South Korean curler. He competed in the 2018 Winter Olympics as the second on the South Korean men's team skipped by Kim Chang-min. In April 2018, he competed at the 2018 World Men's Curling Championship, where the South Korean men's team took fourth place in their best performance to date.
