= Miyo Ichikawa =

Japanese curler

- Curler ♀
- Born: June 28, 1989 (age 37); Karuizawa, Japan

Team
- Curling club: Karuizawa CC, Karuizawa

Curling career
- Member Association: Japan
- World Championship: 1 (2013)
- Pacific-Asia Championship: 2 (2011, 2012)
Medal record
Curling
Pacific-Asia Championships
Silver medal – second place	2012 Naseby
Japan Women's Championship
Gold medal – first place	2011
Gold medal – first place	2012
Gold medal – first place	2014 Sapporo

Miyo Ichikawa (市川 美余, Ichikawa Miyo; born June 28, 1989 in Karuizawa) is a Japanese female curler.

At the international level, she is a 2012 Pacific-Asia silver medallist.

At the national level, she is a three-time Japan women's champion curler (2011, 2012, 2014).

== Teams ==
Season	Skip	Third	Second	Lead	Alternate	Coach	Events
2009–10	Satsuki Fujisawa	Miyuki Satoh	Miyo Ichikawa	Emi Shimizu			
2010–11	Satsuki Fujisawa	Miyo Ichikawa	Emi Shimizu	Miyuki Satoh			
2011–12	Satsuki Fujisawa	Miyo Ichikawa	Emi Shimizu	Miyuki Satoh	Chiaki Matsumura	Hatomi Nagaoka, Hiroaki Wada	PACC 2011 (4th)
2012–13	Satsuki Fujisawa	Miyo Ichikawa	Emi Shimizu	Chiaki Matsumura	Miyuki Satoh	Hatomi Nagaoka	PACC 2012 (silver); WCC 2013 (7th)
2013–14	Satsuki Fujisawa	Miyo Ichikawa	Chiaki Matsumura	Emi Shimizu	Miyuki Satoh (JWCC)		Cont.Cup 2014 (silver); JWCC 2014 (gold)
