= Emi Shimizu =

Japanese curler (born 1990)

- Curler
- Born: December 21, 1990 (age 35)

Team
- Curling club: Chubu Electric Power Curling Team; Karuizawa Curling Club, Karuizawa

Curling career
- Member Association: Japan
- World Championship: 2 (2013, 2019)
- Pacific-Asia Championship: 3 (2011, 2012, 2019)
Medal record
Curling
Representing Japan
Pacific-Asia Championships
Silver medal – second place	2012 Naseby
Silver medal – second place	2019 Shenzhen
Japan Women's Championship
Gold medal – first place	2014 Sapporo
Gold medal – first place	2017 Karuizawa
Silver medal – second place	2020 Karuizawa

Emi Shimizu (清水 絵美, Shimizu Emi; born December 21, 1990) is a Japanese female curler. She is a two-time Pacific-Asia silver medallist (2012, 2019) and a two-time Japan women's champion (2014, 2017).

She is a member of the Chubu Electric Power Curling Team, a works team of Chubu Electric Power.

== Teams ==
Season	Skip	Third	Second	Lead	Alternate	Coach	Events
2009–10	Satsuki Fujisawa	Miyuki Satoh	Miyo Ichikawa	Emi Shimizu			
2010–11	Satsuki Fujisawa	Miyo Ichikawa	Emi Shimizu	Miyuki Satoh			
2011–12	Satsuki Fujisawa	Miyo Ichikawa	Emi Shimizu	Miyuki Satoh	Chiaki Matsumura	Hatomi Nagaoka, Hiroaki Wada	PACC 2011 (4th)
2012–13	Satsuki Fujisawa	Miyo Ichikawa	Emi Shimizu	Chiaki Matsumura	Miyuki Satoh	Hatomi Nagaoka	PACC 2012 (silver); WCC 2013 (7th)
2013–14	Satsuki Fujisawa	Miyo Ichikawa	Chiaki Matsumura	Emi Shimizu	Miyuki Satoh (JWCC)		CCC 2014 (silver); JWCC 2014 (gold)
2014–15	Satsuki Fujisawa	Emi Shimizu	Chiaki Matsumura	Ikue Kitazawa	Hasumi Ishigooka		JWCC 2015 (5th)
2015–16	Emi Shimizu	Chiaki Matsumura	Hasumi Ishigooka	Ikue Kitazawa			
2016–17	Chiaki Matsumura	Emi Shimizu	Ikue Kitazawa	Hasumi Ishigooka	Seina Nakajima		JWCC 2017 (gold)
2017–18	Chiaki Matsumura	Emi Shimizu	Ikue Kitazawa	Hasumi Ishigooka	Seina Nakajima		JWCC 2018 (bronze)
2018–19	Chiaki Matsumura (fourth)	Ikue Kitazawa	Seina Nakajima (skip)	Hasumi Ishigooka	Emi Shimizu	Yusuke Morozumi	WCC 2019 (4th)
2019–20	Ikue Kitazawa (fourth)	Chiaki Matsumura	Seina Nakajima (skip)	Hasumi Ishigooka	Emi Shimizu	Yusuke Morozumi	PACC 2019 (silver)

== Personal life ==
Her brother is two-time Pacific-Asian champion curler Tetsuro Shimizu.
