= Peter de Boer =

New Zealand curler (born 1971)

- Curler
- Born: 26 August 1971 (age 55); Dunfermline, Scotland

Team
- Curling club: Auckland CC, Auckland
- Skip: Peter de Boer
- Third: Kenny Thomson
- Second: Gordon Hay
- Lead: Phil Dowling

Curling career
- Member Association: New Zealand
- World Championship: 3 (2012, 2023, 2024)
- Pacific-Asia Championship: 5 (2011, 2012, 2013, 2015, 2016)
- Pan Continental Championship: 2 (2022, 2023)
Medal record
Men's curling
Representing New Zealand
Pacific-Asia Curling Championships
Silver medal – second place	2011 Nanjing
New Zealand Winter Games
Silver medal – second place	2013 Naseby

Peter de Boer (born 26 August 1971) is a New Zealand curler originally from Scotland. He currently coaches the New Zealand national men's curling team.

== Career ==
De Boer began curling in his native Scotland, where he played in the national championships and also played on the World Curling Tour. He finished in second place in the national championships in 2004 and 2005.

After moving to New Zealand in 2007, he began curling in New Zealand in 2010, and was selected to play on the national team after a runner-up finish in the New Zealand championships in 2011. De Boer led New Zealand to its best finish at the 2011 Pacific-Asia Curling Championships in recent years, winning a silver and a medal, and going to the world championships, where they finished in fifth place. However, at the 2012 Pacific-Asia Curling Championships, he led New Zealand to a less successful result, placing 6th.

== Personal life ==
De Boer is married and has three daughters. He works as a business coach and is self employed. He lives in Wellington, New Zealand. He studied at the University of Edinburgh.
