= Scott Becker =

New Zealand curler and coach (born 1984)

- Curler
- Born: 24 November 1984 (age 41); Ranfurly, New Zealand

Team
- Curling club: Ranfurly Curling Club; Ranfurly, New Zealand
- Skip: Sean Becker
- Third: Warren Dobson
- Second: Scott Becker
- Lead: James Becker
- Alternate: Warren Kearny

Curling career
- Member Association: New Zealand
- World Championship: 1 (2012)
- World Mixed Doubles Championship: 3 (2009, 2016, 2017)
- Pacific-Asia Championship: 11 (2007, 2008, 2009, 2011, 2012, 2013, 2014, 2015, 2016, 2018, 2019)
- Pan Continental Championship: 1 (2025)
Medal record
Men's curling
Representing New Zealand
Pacific Curling Championships
Silver medal – second place	2011 Nanjing
Bronze medal – third place	2008 Naseby
Bronze medal – third place	2007 Beijing

Scott Becker (born 24 November 1984 in Ranfurly, New Zealand) is a New Zealand curler and curling coach. He currently plays second on his brother Sean Becker's team.

== Curling career ==
On international level he won silver on 2011 Pacific-Asia Curling Championships and won bronze on 2007 and 2008 Pacific Curling Championships. He played for New Zealand national men's team on one World Curling Championship (2012) and ten Pacific Curling Championships (2007, 2008, 2009, 2011, 2012, 2013, 2014, 2015, 2016, 2018). He played too for New Zealand national mixed doubles team on three World Mixed Doubles Curling Championship (2009, 2016, 2017).

On the national level, he has been New Zealand men's champion (2007, 2008, 2009, 2011, 2014, 2015, 2017, 2018) and runner-up (2005, 2006, 2012). He has also been New Zealand mixed doubles champion (2008, 2015, 2016), runner-up (2007, 2014) and bronze (2009).

He was also coach of New Zealand national mixed doubles team for the 2010 World Mixed Doubles Curling Championship (they won silver) and on 2011 World Mixed Doubles Curling Championship (they finished 14th).

== Personal life ==
Becker's family is well known as a curling family. Scott's mother, father, older brother, sister and grandfather have all represented New Zealand on an international scale. Scott's father, Peter Becker, is known as one of the first curlers to represent New Zealand internationally. He was also the coach of the women's team as well as the Secretary of the New Zealand Curling Association. Scott's older brother, Sean Becker, is one of the most successful and well known New Zealand curlers. Scott's sister, Bridget Becker has been the skip of the New Zealand women's national curling team. Married in 2019 to Jenna Morris-Williamson (now Becker).
