= 2025 Korean Mixed Doubles Curling Championship =

National mixed doubles curling championship

- Host city: Jincheon, South Korea
- Arena: Jincheon National Training Centre
- Dates: July 21–29
- Winner: Gangwon E
- Female: Kim Seon-yeong
- Male: Jeong Yeong-seok
- Finalist: Gangwon D (H. Kim / Yoo)

The 2025 Korean Mixed Doubles Curling Championship, South Korea's national mixed doubles curling championship, was held from July 21 to 29 at the Jincheon National Training Centre in Jincheon, South Korea. The winning pair of Kim Seon-yeong and Jeong Yeong-seok became the Korean National Team for the 2025–26 curling season. They will represent Korea at the 2026 World Mixed Doubles Curling Championship in Geneva, Switzerland and the Olympic Qualification Event to try to qualify for the 2026 Winter Olympics. Through regional qualifiers, the field was narrowed down from over fifty teams to twenty-five who competed in the national championship. The preliminary round was held in a round robin format which qualified the top two teams in each pool and the two best third place teams for the playoff round. In a continuation of the 2024 format, players from different regions were able to compete together, forming composite teams.

Defending champions Kim Kyeong-ae and Seong Ji-hoon earned an automatic bye to the championship and did not have to compete in the regional qualifiers. 2024 runner-up Lee Ki-bok returned with new partner and 2025 world junior champion skip Kang Bo-bae while bronze medalists and 2023 silver medalists Kim Hye-rin and Yoo Min-hyeon again qualified out of Gangwon. 2025 national women's champions Kim Min-ji and Seol Ye-ji both qualified out of Gyeonggi with their partners Jeong Byeong-jin and Kim San respectively, while four of five members of Kim Soo-hyuk's men's championship rink also advanced to the championship with members of Ha Seung-youn's squad. Additionally, Gangneung's Kim Eun-jung competed in mixed doubles for the first time with partner Park Jong-duk, though the pair did not advance to the finals.

== Medalists ==
	Gold	Silver	Bronze
Team	Gangwon E Kim Seon-yeong; Jeong Yeong-seok	Gangwon D Kim Hye-rin; Yoo Min-hyeon	Daegu B Lee Hae-in; Kim Hong-geon

== Qualification process ==
Regional Qualifiers	Vacancies	Qualified
Gangwon Qualifier	5	Kim Kyeong-ae / Seong Ji-hoon; Ha Seung-youn / Kim Hak-kyun; Kim Su-jin / Kim Chang-min; Kim Hye-rin / Yoo Min-hyeon; Kim Seon-yeong / Jeong Yeong-seok
Jeonbuk Qualifier	3	Kang Bo-bae / Lee Ki-bok; Shim Yu-jeong / Park Jin-hwan; Kim Ji-soo / Park Jong-hyeon
Gyeonggi Qualifier	3	Hwang Ye-ji / Park Hyo-ik; Seol Ye-ji / Kim San; Kim Min-ji / Jeong Byeong-jin
Daegu Qualifier	3	Kim Sur-yeong / Kwon Jun-i; Lee Hae-in / Kim Hong-geon; Oh Ji-hyeon / Yoon Ji-hoo
Gyeongbuk Qualifier	3	Bang Yu-jin / Kim Jin-hun; Kim Ye-ji / Park Seong-min; Park Seo-jin / Jeon Jae-ik
Seoul Qualifier	4	Kim Ji-yoon / Lee Ki-jeong; Lee Eun-chae / Kim Min-woo; Yang Seung-hee / Lee Jae-beom; Park You-been / Kim Jeong-min
Chungbuk Region	3	Lee Seong-rin / Cho Jang-yeon; Kim Soo-bin / Park Kyung-ho; Shin Eun-jin / Jeon Byeong-wook
Ulsan Region	1	Park Ye-rin / Choi Jeong-wook
TOTAL	25	

== Teams ==
The teams are listed as follows:

Team	Female	Male	Region
Chungbuk A	Lee Seong-rin	Cho Jang-yeon	Chungbuk
Chungbuk B	Kim Soo-bin	Park Kyung-ho	Chungbuk
Chungbuk C	Shin Eun-jin	Jeon Byeong-wook	Chungbuk
Daegu A	Oh Ji-hyeon	Yoon Ji-hoo	Daegu
Daegu B	Lee Hae-in	Kim Hong-geon	Daegu
Daegu C	Kim Sur-yeong	Kwon Jun-i	Daegu
Gangwon A	Kim Kyeong-ae	Seong Ji-hoon	Gangwon
Gangwon B	Ha Seung-youn	Kim Hak-kyun	Gangwon
Gangwon C	Kim Su-jin	Kim Chang-min	Gangwon
Gangwon D	Kim Hye-rin	Yoo Min-hyeon	Gangwon
Gangwon E	Kim Seon-yeong	Jeong Yeong-seok	Gangwon
Gyeongbuk A	Kim Ye-ji	Park Seong-min	Gyeongbuk
Gyeongbuk B	Park Seo-jin	Jeon Jae-ik	Gyeongbuk
Gyeonggi A	Kim Min-ji	Jeong Byeong-jin	Gyeonggi
Gyeonggi B	Hwang Ye-ji	Park Hyo-ik	Gyeonggi
Gyeonggi C	Seol Ye-ji	Kim San	Gyeonggi
Jeonbuk A	Kang Bo-bae	Lee Ki-bok	Jeonbuk
Jeonbuk B	Shim Yu-jeong	Park Jin-hwan	Jeonbuk
Jeonbuk C	Kim Ji-soo	Park Jong-hyeon	Jeonbuk
Seoul A	Park You-been	Kim Jeong-min	Seoul
Seoul B	Lee Eun-chae	Kim Min-woo	Seoul
Seoul C	Kim Ji-yoon	Lee Ki-jeong	Seoul
Seoul D	Yang Seung-hee	Lee Jae-beom	Seoul
Uiseong	Bang Yu-jin	Kim Jin-hun	Gyeongbuk
Ulsan	Park Ye-rin	Choi Jeong-wook	Ulsan

== Round robin standings ==
Final Round Robin Standings

Key
Teams to Playoffs

Pool A	Athletes	W	L	W–L	PF	PA	EW	EL	BE	SE	DSC
Seoul C	Kim Ji-yoon / Lee Ki-jeong	7	1	1–0	51	44	31	32	0	9	45.6
Gangwon D	Kim Hye-rin / Yoo Min-hyeon	7	1	0–1	61	27	38	19	1	20	35.8
Seoul A	Park You-been / Kim Jeong-min	6	2	–	59	38	34	24	0	15	37.5
Gangwon A	Kim Kyeong-ae / Seong Ji-hoon	5	3	–	50	45	32	28	0	12	41.3
Gyeongbuk B	Park Seo-jin / Jeon Jae-ik	4	4	–	60	52	31	30	0	15	49.0
Gyeonggi B	Hwang Ye-ji / Park Hyo-ik	3	5	1–0	45	54	29	32	0	13	38.4
Jeonbuk A	Kang Bo-bae / Lee Ki-bok	3	5	0–1	54	51	27	29	0	7	29.8
Daegu C	Kim Sur-yeong / Kwon Jun-i	1	7	–	30	68	22	36	0	6	43.4
Chungbuk C	Shin Eun-jin / Jeon Byeong-wook	0	8	–	34	65	21	35	0	5	38.7

Pool B	Athletes	W	L	W–L	PF	PA	EW	EL	BE	SE	DSC
Gangwon E	Kim Seon-yeong / Jeong Yeong-seok	6	1	1–0	56	32	28	22	0	8	48.6
Jeonbuk B	Shim Yu-jeong / Park Jin-hwan	6	1	0–1	56	43	33	22	0	12	57.1
Daegu B	Lee Hae-in / Kim Hong-geon	4	3	1–1	58	37	31	22	0	11	29.3
Seoul D	Yang Seung-hee / Lee Jae-beom	4	3	1–1	42	40	26	26	0	10	34.6
Gyeonggi C	Seol Ye-ji / Kim San	4	3	1–1	52	41	26	23	0	8	48.2
Gyeongbuk A	Kim Ye-ji / Park Seong-min	3	4	–	39	42	22	26	0	8	48.2
Chungbuk B	Kim Soo-bin / Park Kyung-ho	1	6	–	26	61	18	31	0	5	60.6
Ulsan	Park Ye-rin / Choi Jeong-wook	0	7	–	23	56	19	31	0	6	80.9

Pool C	Athletes	W	L	W–L	PF	PA	EW	EL	BE	SE	DSC
Gyeonggi A	Kim Min-ji / Jeong Byeong-jin	6	1	1–1	60	25	28	18	0	15	16.7
Gangwon C	Kim Su-jin / Kim Chang-min	6	1	1–1	47	38	27	25	0	9	33.4
Seoul B	Lee Eun-chae / Kim Min-woo	6	1	1–1	44	25	28	15	0	16	42.0
Uiseong	Bang Yu-jin / Kim Jin-hun	3	4	1–0	49	39	25	22	0	13	50.0
Jeonbuk C	Kim Ji-soo / Park Jong-hyeon	3	4	0–1	38	46	21	22	0	7	40.6
Chungbuk A	Lee Seong-rin / Cho Jang-yeon	2	5	1–0	17	47	9	22	0	2	92.7
Gangwon B	Ha Seung-youn / Kim Hak-kyun	2	5	0–1	28	34	16	20	0	5	80.6
Daegu A	Oh Ji-hyeon / Yoon Ji-hoo	0	7	–	27	56	20	30	0	5	47.2

=== Ranking of third-placed teams ===
Of the three teams placing third in their respective groups, only the two teams with the best Draw Shot Challenge qualified for the playoffs.

Team	Pool	DSC
Daegu B	B	29.3
Seoul A	A	37.5
Seoul B	C	42.0

== Round robin results ==
All draws are listed in Korea Standard Time (UTC+09:00).

=== Draw 1 ===
Monday, July 21, 8:00 pm

Sheet A	1	2	3	4	5	6	7	8	Final
Seoul A (Park / Kim)	0	3	0	3	0	0	1	0	7
Gangwon A (Kim / Seong) 🔨	2	0	1	0	2	2	0	1	8

Sheet C	1	2	3	4	5	6	7	8	9	Final
Seoul C (Kim / Lee)	3	2	1	0	0	1	0	0	1	8
Gyeongbuk B (Park / Jeon) 🔨	0	0	0	1	1	0	4	1	0	7

Sheet D	1	2	3	4	5	6	7	8	Final
Daegu C (Kim / Kwon) 🔨	1	0	0	2	0	1	0	0	4
Gyeonggi B (Hwang / Park)	0	3	1	0	2	0	1	1	8

Sheet E	1	2	3	4	5	6	7	8	Final
Gangwon D (Kim / Yoo) 🔨	0	0	1	1	0	1	2	1	6
Chungbuk C (Shin / Jeon)	0	1	0	0	1	0	0	0	2

=== Draw 2 ===
Tuesday, July 22, 9:00 am

Sheet A	1	2	3	4	5	6	7	8	Final
Seoul D (Yang / Lee) 🔨	0	1	0	4	0	3	0	X	8
Ulsan (Park / Choi)	1	0	1	0	1	0	2	X	5

Sheet B	1	2	3	4	5	6	7	8	Final
Gangwon E (S. Kim / Y. Jeong) 🔨	4	0	3	0	0	2	0	1	10
Daegu B (H. Lee / H. Kim)	0	2	0	3	2	0	2	0	9

Sheet D	1	2	3	4	5	6	7	8	9	Final
Gyeonggi C (Seol / Kim) 🔨	3	0	4	0	1	0	2	0	0	10
Jeonbuk B (Shim / Park)	0	2	0	2	0	2	0	4	1	11

Sheet E	1	2	3	4	5	6	7	8	Final
Gyeongbuk A (Y. Kim / S. Park) 🔨	3	0	1	1	0	4	2	X	11
Chungbuk B (S. Kim / K. Park)	0	1	0	0	1	0	0	X	2

=== Draw 3 ===
Tuesday, July 22, 12:30 pm

Sheet B	1	2	3	4	5	6	7	8	Final
Seoul A (Park / Kim) 🔨	0	3	0	1	0	0	2	X	6
Gyeongbuk B (Park / Jeon)	1	0	1	0	1	1	0	X	4

Sheet C	1	2	3	4	5	6	7	8	Final
Gangwon D (Kim / Yoo) 🔨	2	0	0	3	3	2	X	X	10
Gyeonggi B (Hwang / Park)	0	1	1	0	0	0	X	X	2

Sheet D	1	2	3	4	5	6	7	8	Final
Jeonbuk A (Kang / Lee) 🔨	0	4	0	2	0	5	X	X	11
Chungbuk C (Shin / Jeon)	1	0	1	0	1	0	X	X	3

Sheet E	1	2	3	4	5	6	7	8	Final
Seoul C (Kim / Lee)	1	1	0	0	5	0	2	X	9
Daegu C (Kim / Kwon) 🔨	0	0	1	1	0	1	0	X	3

=== Draw 4 ===
Tuesday, July 22, 4:00 pm

Sheet A	1	2	3	4	5	6	7	8	Final
Daegu A (Oh / Yoon)	0	0	0	1	1	1	0	X	3
Gyeonggi A (M. Kim / B. Jeong) 🔨	4	1	1	0	0	0	3	X	9

Sheet B	1	2	3	4	5	6	7	8	Final
Chungbuk A (Lee / Cho)	0	0	0	1	2	0	X	X	3
Jeonbuk C (J. Kim / J. Park) 🔨	3	4	1	0	0	2	X	X	10

Sheet C	1	2	3	4	5	6	7	8	Final
Uiseong (Bang / Kim)	3	0	0	0	0	1	0	X	4
Seoul B (E. Lee / M. Kim) 🔨	0	2	1	1	2	0	1	X	7

Sheet D	1	2	3	4	5	6	7	8	9	Final
Gangwon B (Ha / Kim) 🔨	1	1	1	0	3	0	1	0	0	7
Gangwon C (Kim / Kim)	0	0	0	2	0	4	0	1	1	8

=== Draw 5 ===
Tuesday, July 22, 7:30 pm

Sheet A	1	2	3	4	5	6	7	8	Final
Gangwon D (Kim / Yoo)	1	1	0	1	0	0	1	0	4
Seoul C (Kim / Lee) 🔨	0	0	1	0	2	1	0	1	5

Sheet C	1	2	3	4	5	6	7	8	9	Final
Seoul A (Park / Kim)	0	3	0	2	1	1	1	0	1	9
Daegu C (Kim / Kwon) 🔨	3	0	3	0	0	0	0	2	0	8

Sheet D	1	2	3	4	5	6	7	8	9	Final
Gangwon A (Kim / Seong) 🔨	0	2	1	0	2	0	2	0	3	10
Gyeongbuk B (Park / Jeon)	1	0	0	1	0	2	0	3	0	7

Sheet E	1	2	3	4	5	6	7	8	9	Final
Jeonbuk A (Kang / Lee) 🔨	1	0	0	2	0	3	1	0	0	7
Gyeonggi B (Hwang / Park)	0	2	2	0	1	0	0	2	1	8

=== Draw 6 ===
Wednesday, July 23, 9:00 am

Sheet B	1	2	3	4	5	6	7	8	Final
Gyeongbuk A (Y. Kim / S. Park)	0	0	0	0	1	0	2	X	3
Seoul D (Yang / Lee) 🔨	3	1	1	1	0	3	0	X	9

Sheet C	1	2	3	4	5	6	7	8	Final
Gyeonggi C (Seol / Kim) 🔨	2	1	1	0	0	4	0	X	8
Ulsan (Park / Choi)	0	0	0	1	1	0	1	X	3

Sheet D	1	2	3	4	5	6	7	8	Final
Chungbuk B (S. Kim / K. Park)	0	1	0	0	1	0	X	X	2
Daegu B (H. Lee / H. Kim) 🔨	2	0	6	1	0	1	X	X	10

Sheet E	1	2	3	4	5	6	7	8	Final
Jeonbuk B (Shim / Park) 🔨	1	0	1	2	0	1	0	X	5
Gangwon E (S. Kim / Y. Jeong)	0	3	0	0	2	0	5	X	10

=== Draw 7 ===
Wednesday, July 23, 12:30 pm

Sheet A	1	2	3	4	5	6	7	8	9	Final
Jeonbuk C (J. Kim / J. Park)	0	1	0	1	2	0	1	0	0	5
Gangwon C (Kim / Kim) 🔨	1	0	1	0	0	2	0	1	1	6

Sheet B	1	2	3	4	5	6	7	8	Final
Gyeonggi A (M. Kim / B. Jeong) 🔨	1	2	1	0	1	4	X	X	9
Gangwon B (Ha / Kim)	0	0	0	3	0	0	X	X	3

Sheet D	1	2	3	4	5	6	7	8	Final
Chungbuk A (Lee / Cho)	0	0	1	0	0	0	X	X	1
Uiseong (Bang / Kim) 🔨	3	2	0	3	1	3	X	X	12

Sheet E	1	2	3	4	5	6	7	8	Final
Daegu A (Oh / Yoon) 🔨	0	1	0	2	0	0	1	0	4
Seoul B (E. Lee / M. Kim)	1	0	1	0	1	2	0	1	6

=== Draw 8 ===
Wednesday, July 23, 4:00 pm

Sheet A	1	2	3	4	5	6	7	8	Final
Gangwon A (Kim / Seong) 🔨	1	0	1	1	0	3	0	0	6
Daegu C (Kim / Kwon)	0	1	0	0	2	0	1	1	5

Sheet B	1	2	3	4	5	6	7	8	Final
Chungbuk C (Shin / Jeon) 🔨	0	0	0	2	0	2	0	X	4
Gyeonggi B (Hwang / Park)	1	1	2	0	1	0	4	X	9

Sheet C	1	2	3	4	5	6	7	8	Final
Jeonbuk A (Kang / Lee) 🔨	0	1	0	1	0	1	0	1	4
Seoul C (Kim / Lee)	1	0	1	0	1	0	2	0	5

Sheet D	1	2	3	4	5	6	7	8	Final
Seoul A (Park / Kim) 🔨	2	0	0	0	1	0	1	X	4
Gangwon D (Kim / Yoo)	0	1	1	2	0	1	0	X	5

=== Draw 9 ===
Wednesday, July 23, 7:30 pm

Sheet A	1	2	3	4	5	6	7	8	Final
Gyeonggi C (Seol / Kim)	0	1	0	1	0	0	X	X	2
Gangwon E (S. Kim / Y. Jeong) 🔨	1	0	2	0	4	2	X	X	9

Sheet C	1	2	3	4	5	6	7	8	Final
Chungbuk B (S. Kim / K. Park)	0	2	2	0	1	0	0	0	5
Jeonbuk B (Shim / Park) 🔨	4	0	0	1	0	2	1	2	10

Sheet D	1	2	3	4	5	6	7	8	Final
Ulsan (Park / Choi)	1	0	0	0	0	0	0	X	1
Gyeongbuk A (Y. Kim / S. Park) 🔨	0	2	3	1	3	1	1	X	11

Sheet E	1	2	3	4	5	6	7	8	9	Final
Daegu B (H. Lee / H. Kim) 🔨	1	1	0	0	1	1	0	1	0	5
Seoul D (Yang / Lee)	0	0	1	1	0	0	3	0	3	8

=== Draw 10 ===
Thursday, July 24, 9:00 am

Sheet A	Final
Seoul B (E. Lee / M. Kim) 🔨	W
Chungbuk A (Lee / Cho)	L

Sheet B	1	2	3	4	5	6	7	8	Final
Gangwon C (Kim / Kim) 🔨	0	1	0	4	1	0	0	1	7
Uiseong (Bang / Kim)	2	0	2	0	0	1	1	0	6

Sheet C	1	2	3	4	5	6	7	8	Final
Daegu A (Oh / Yoon) 🔨	1	0	0	1	2	0	1	0	5
Gangwon B (Ha / Kim)	0	2	1	0	0	2	0	1	6

Sheet E	1	2	3	4	5	6	7	8	Final
Jeonbuk C (J. Kim / J. Park) 🔨	0	1	0	0	3	0	0	X	4
Gyeonggi A (M. Kim / B. Jeong)	1	0	3	2	0	2	1	X	9

=== Draw 11 ===
Thursday, July 24, 12:30 pm

Sheet B	1	2	3	4	5	6	7	8	Final
Gangwon A (Kim / Seong)	0	0	0	1	1	1	0	X	3
Jeonbuk A (Kang / Lee) 🔨	2	2	1	0	0	0	3	X	8

Sheet C	1	2	3	4	5	6	7	8	Final
Chungbuk C (Shin / Jeon)	0	0	0	2	0	0	2	X	4
Seoul A (Park / Kim) 🔨	2	1	1	0	2	2	0	X	8

Sheet D	1	2	3	4	5	6	7	8	9	Final
Gyeonggi B (Hwang / Park)	2	0	1	0	0	2	0	2	0	7
Seoul C (Kim / Lee) 🔨	0	4	0	1	1	0	1	0	1	8

Sheet E	1	2	3	4	5	6	7	8	Final
Gyeongbuk B (Park / Jeon)	0	0	4	0	0	1	0	0	5
Gangwon D (Kim / Yoo) 🔨	1	2	0	1	1	0	3	1	9

=== Draw 12 ===
Thursday, July 24, 4:00 pm

Sheet B	1	2	3	4	5	6	7	8	Final
Jeonbuk B (Shim / Park) 🔨	1	1	0	0	2	1	0	2	7
Ulsan (Park / Choi)	0	0	2	1	0	0	2	0	5

Sheet C	1	2	3	4	5	6	7	8	Final
Gyeongbuk A (Y. Kim / S. Park)	0	0	2	0	1	0	0	X	3
Daegu B (H. Lee / H. Kim) 🔨	5	1	0	1	0	2	1	X	10

Sheet D	1	2	3	4	5	6	7	8	Final
Seoul D (Yang / Lee) 🔨	0	1	0	0	1	1	0	0	3
Gangwon E (S. Kim / Y. Jeong)	1	0	3	1	0	0	1	1	7

Sheet E	1	2	3	4	5	6	7	8	Final
Gyeonggi C (Seol / Kim) 🔨	5	1	0	2	0	0	2	X	10
Chungbuk B (S. Kim / K. Park)	0	0	2	0	1	1	0	X	4

=== Draw 13 ===
Thursday, July 24, 7:30 pm

Sheet A	1	2	3	4	5	6	7	8	Final
Uiseong (Bang / Kim) 🔨	3	0	1	0	0	0	X	X	4
Gangwon B (Ha / Kim)	0	4	0	1	3	2	X	X	10

Sheet B	1	2	3	4	5	6	7	8	Final
Daegu A (Oh / Yoon)	0	2	0	3	0	0	0	X	5
Jeonbuk C (J. Kim / J. Park) 🔨	3	0	2	0	1	1	2	X	9

Sheet D	1	2	3	4	5	6	7	8	Final
Gyeonggi A (M. Kim / B. Jeong) 🔨	5	0	1	0	0	0	0	0	6
Seoul B (E. Lee / M. Kim)	0	1	0	1	1	1	1	2	7

Sheet E	1	2	3	4	5	6	7	8	Final
Chungbuk A (Lee / Cho)	1	0	0	0	0	0	X	X	1
Gangwon C (Kim / Kim) 🔨	0	2	1	3	2	1	X	X	9

=== Draw 14 ===
Friday, July 25, 9:00 am

Sheet A	1	2	3	4	5	6	7	8	Final
Gyeonggi B (Hwang / Park)	2	1	2	0	0	0	0	0	5
Gyeongbuk B (Park / Jeon) 🔨	0	0	0	2	1	1	2	1	7

Sheet C	1	2	3	4	5	6	7	8	Final
Gangwon D (Kim / Yoo)	1	0	2	2	0	2	1	X	8
Jeonbuk A (Kang / Lee) 🔨	0	1	0	0	2	0	0	X	3

Sheet D	1	2	3	4	5	6	7	8	Final
Daegu C (Kim / Kwon)	1	1	1	0	2	0	0		W
Chungbuk C (Shin / Jeon) 🔨	0	0	0	2	0	3	1	/	L^

Sheet E	1	2	3	4	5	6	7	8	Final
Seoul C (Kim / Lee) 🔨	2	0	1	0	1	0	2	X	6
Gangwon A (Kim / Seong)	0	1	0	1	0	1	0	X	3

^ Chungbuk C ran out of time, and therefore forfeited the match.

=== Draw 15 ===
Friday, July 25, 12:30 pm

Sheet A	1	2	3	4	5	6	7	8	Final
Chungbuk B (S. Kim / K. Park) 🔨	3	1	0	0	0	0	0	X	4
Seoul D (Yang / Lee)	0	0	1	2	2	1	1	X	7

Sheet B	1	2	3	4	5	6	7	8	Final
Gyeonggi C (Seol / Kim)	0	1	0	1	1	0	0	X	3
Daegu B (H. Lee / H. Kim) 🔨	1	0	4	0	0	2	2	X	9

Sheet C	1	2	3	4	5	6	7	8	Final
Ulsan (Park / Choi)	0	0	1	1	0	1	0	X	3
Gangwon E (S. Kim / Y. Jeong) 🔨	3	1	0	0	2	0	2	X	8

Sheet E	1	2	3	4	5	6	7	8	Final
Jeonbuk B (Shim / Park)	1	2	1	0	2	1	0	X	7
Gyeongbuk A (Y. Kim / S. Park) 🔨	0	0	0	1	0	0	1	X	2

=== Draw 16 ===
Friday, July 25, 4:00 pm

Sheet B	1	2	3	4	5	6	7	8	Final
Gyeonggi A (M. Kim / B. Jeong) 🔨	2	3	0	4	1	0	X	X	10
Chungbuk A (Lee / Cho)	0	0	1	0	0	2	X	X	3

Sheet C	1	2	3	4	5	6	7	8	Final
Jeonbuk C (J. Kim / J. Park) 🔨	1	0	1	1	0	5	0	0	8
Uiseong (Bang / Kim)	0	5	0	0	1	0	4	1	11

Sheet D	1	2	3	4	5	6	7	8	Final
Daegu A (Oh / Yoon)	0	1	0	1	1	1	0	X	4
Gangwon C (Kim / Kim) 🔨	1	0	1	0	0	0	5	X	7

Sheet E	1	2	3	4	5	6	7	8	Final
Seoul B (E. Lee / M. Kim)	1	1	0	3	1	0	2	X	8
Gangwon B (Ha / Kim) 🔨	0	0	1	0	0	1	0	X	2

=== Draw 17 ===
Friday, July 25, 7:30 pm

Sheet A	1	2	3	4	5	6	7	8	Final
Jeonbuk A (Kang / Lee) 🔨	2	0	0	1	0	3	0	X	6
Seoul A (Park / Kim)	0	2	1	0	3	0	4	X	10

Sheet B	1	2	3	4	5	6	7	8	9	Final
Chungbuk C (Shin / Jeon) 🔨	3	1	1	0	0	2	0	1	0	8
Seoul C (Kim / Lee)	0	0	0	1	1	0	6	0	1	9

Sheet C	1	2	3	4	5	6	7	8	Final
Gyeongbuk B (Park / Jeon)	0	0	1	1	3	0	3	X	8
Daegu C (Kim / Kwon) 🔨	1	1	0	0	0	1	0	X	3

Sheet D	1	2	3	4	5	6	7	8	Final
Gangwon A (Kim / Seong) 🔨	2	0	1	0	0	2	0	0	5
Gangwon D (Kim / Yoo)	0	2	0	1	1	0	1	1	6

=== Draw 18 ===
Saturday, July 26, 9:00 am

Sheet A	1	2	3	4	5	6	7	8	9	Final
Daegu B (H. Lee / H. Kim) 🔨	3	0	0	1	0	2	0	2	0	8
Jeonbuk B (Shim / Park)	0	2	3	0	1	0	2	0	1	9

Sheet B	1	2	3	4	5	6	7	8	Final
Ulsan (Park / Choi)	0	0	2	0	1	0	1	X	4
Chungbuk B (S. Kim / K. Park) 🔨	2	2	0	1	0	2	0	X	7

Sheet C	1	2	3	4	5	6	7	8	Final
Gyeonggi C (Seol / Kim)	0	1	0	4	1	0	3	X	9
Seoul D (Yang / Lee) 🔨	1	0	1	0	0	2	0	X	4

Sheet D	1	2	3	4	5	6	7	8	Final
Gangwon E (S. Kim / Y. Jeong)	0	0	1	0	1	0	1	X	3
Gyeongbuk A (Y. Kim / S. Park) 🔨	4	1	0	2	0	1	0	X	8

=== Draw 19 ===
Saturday, July 26, 1:00 pm

Sheet A	Final
Gangwon B (Ha / Kim)	L
Chungbuk A (Lee / Cho) 🔨	W

Sheet C	1	2	3	4	5	6	7	8	Final
Gangwon C (Kim / Kim) 🔨	0	2	0	0	0	1	X	X	3
Gyeonggi A (M. Kim / B. Jeong)	2	0	5	3	1	0	X	X	11

Sheet D	1	2	3	4	5	6	7	8	Final
Seoul B (E. Lee / M. Kim)	3	3	2	0	0	4	X	X	12
Jeonbuk C (J. Kim / J. Park) 🔨	0	0	0	1	1	0	X	X	2

Sheet E	1	2	3	4	5	6	7	8	Final
Daegu A (Oh / Yoon) 🔨	0	0	0	0	0	0	X	X	0
Uiseong (Bang / Kim)	3	1	1	2	2	1	X	X	10

=== Draw 20 ===
Saturday, July 26, 5:00 pm

Sheet B	1	2	3	4	5	6	7	8	Final
Daegu C (Kim / Kwon)	0	0	0	1	0	0	X	X	1
Gangwon D (Kim / Yoo) 🔨	3	1	2	0	4	3	X	X	13

Sheet C	1	2	3	4	5	6	7	8	Final
Chungbuk C (Shin / Jeon) 🔨	0	0	0	2	0	0	X	X	2
Gangwon A (Kim / Seong)	1	2	2	0	2	1	X	X	8

Sheet D	1	2	3	4	5	6	7	8	Final
Gyeongbuk B (Park / Jeon)	0	4	3	2	0	4	X	X	13
Jeonbuk A (Kang / Lee) 🔨	2	0	0	0	4	0	X	X	6

Sheet E	1	2	3	4	5	6	7	8	Final
Gyeonggi B (Hwang / Park) 🔨	0	0	1	0	0	0	1	X	2
Seoul A (Park / Kim)	1	1	0	2	2	1	0	X	7

=== Draw 21 ===
Sunday, July 27, 9:00 am

Sheet A	1	2	3	4	5	6	7	8	Final
Gyeonggi C (Seol / Kim) 🔨	3	2	2	1	0	2	X	X	10
Gyeongbuk A (Y. Kim / S. Park)	0	0	0	0	1	0	X	X	1

Sheet C	1	2	3	4	5	6	7	8	Final
Gangwon E (S. Kim / Y. Jeong) 🔨	0	1	1	3	0	2	2	X	9
Chungbuk B (S. Kim / K. Park)	1	0	0	0	1	0	0	X	2

Sheet D	1	2	3	4	5	6	7	8	Final
Seoul D (Yang / Lee)	1	0	1	0	1	0	0	X	3
Jeonbuk B (Shim / Park) 🔨	0	2	0	2	0	2	1	X	7

Sheet E	1	2	3	4	5	6	7	8	Final
Daegu B (H. Lee / H. Kim) 🔨	0	1	1	2	1	2	0	X	7
Ulsan (Park / Choi)	1	0	0	0	0	0	1	X	2

=== Draw 22 ===
Sunday, July 27, 1:00 pm

Sheet A	1	2	3	4	5	6	7	8	Final
Uiseong (Bang / Kim)	0	0	0	1	0	1	X	X	2
Gyeonggi A (M. Kim / B. Jeong) 🔨	2	1	2	0	1	0	X	X	6

Sheet B	1	2	3	4	5	6	7	8	Final
Gangwon C (Kim / Kim) 🔨	2	2	2	0	1	0	0	X	7
Seoul B (E. Lee / M. Kim)	0	0	0	1	0	2	1	X	4

Sheet C	1	2	3	4	5	6	7	8	Final
Daegu A (Oh / Yoon) 🔨	2	0	1	0	2	0	1	X	6
Chungbuk A (Lee / Cho)	0	5	0	2	0	2	0	X	9

Sheet E	Final
Gangwon B (Ha / Kim)	L
Jeonbuk C (J. Kim / J. Park) 🔨	W

=== Draw 23 ===
Sunday, July 27, 5:00 pm

Sheet A	1	2	3	4	5	6	7	8	Final
Gyeongbuk B (Park / Jeon) 🔨	0	4	0	1	2	2	0	X	9
Chungbuk C (Shin / Jeon)	1	0	1	0	0	0	3	X	5

Sheet B	1	2	3	4	5	6	7	8	Final
Gyeonggi B (Hwang / Park) 🔨	0	1	1	0	0	0	2	X	4
Gangwon A (Kim / Seong)	1	0	0	2	1	3	0	X	7

Sheet D	1	2	3	4	5	6	7	8	Final
Seoul C (Kim / Lee) 🔨	1	0	0	0	0	0	X	X	1
Seoul A (Park / Kim)	0	4	1	1	1	1	X	X	8

Sheet E	1	2	3	4	5	6	7	8	Final
Daegu C (Kim / Kwon) 🔨	0	0	1	0	0	0	X	X	1
Jeonbuk A (Kang / Lee)	1	1	0	2	2	3	X	X	9

== Playoffs ==
Quarterfinals
1	Gyeonggi A	7
8	Seoul A	5
4	Gangwon C	6
5	Gangwon D	7
3	Gangwon E	7
6	Jeonbuk B	6
2	Seoul C	4
7	Daegu B	8

Semifinals
1	Gyeonggi A	5
5	Gangwon D	7
3	Gangwon E	10
7	Daegu B	3

Finals
5	Gangwon D	6
3	Gangwon E	12

Bronze medal game
1	Gyeonggi A	5
7	Daegu B	6

=== Quarterfinals ===
Monday, July 28, 10:00 am

Sheet A	1	2	3	4	5	6	7	8	Final
Seoul C (Kim / Lee) 🔨	0	1	0	2	0	1	0	0	4
Daegu B (H. Lee / H. Kim)	1	0	1	0	1	0	4	1	8

Sheet B	1	2	3	4	5	6	7	8	Final
Gangwon E (S. Kim / Y. Jeong) 🔨	0	2	0	3	1	0	0	1	7
Jeonbuk B (Shim / Park)	2	0	1	0	0	2	1	0	6

Sheet D	1	2	3	4	5	6	7	8	9	Final
Gangwon C (Kim / Kim) 🔨	1	1	0	1	0	1	0	2	0	6
Gangwon D (Kim / Yoo)	0	0	3	0	1	0	2	0	1	7

Sheet E	1	2	3	4	5	6	7	8	Final
Gyeonggi A (M. Kim / B. Jeong) 🔨	0	3	0	1	1	1	0	1	7
Seoul A (Park / Kim)	1	0	2	0	0	0	2	0	5

=== Semifinals ===
Monday, July 28, 4:00 pm

Sheet B	1	2	3	4	5	6	7	8	Final
Gyeonggi A (M. Kim / B. Jeong) 🔨	0	0	0	0	2	0	3	X	5
Gangwon D (Kim / Yoo)	2	1	1	1	0	2	0	X	7

Sheet C	1	2	3	4	5	6	7	8	Final
Gangwon E (S. Kim / Y. Jeong) 🔨	4	0	1	0	2	0	3	X	10
Daegu B (H. Lee / H. Kim)	0	1	0	1	0	1	0	X	3

=== Bronze medal game ===
Tuesday, July 29, 10:00 am

Sheet D	1	2	3	4	5	6	7	8	Final
Gyeonggi A (M. Kim / B. Jeong) 🔨	0	0	0	1	0	3	0	1	5
Daegu B (H. Lee / H. Kim)	1	1	2	0	1	0	1	0	6

=== Final ===
Tuesday, July 29, 10:00 am

Sheet A	1	2	3	4	5	6	7	8	Final
Gangwon D (Kim / Yoo)	0	4	0	0	0	2	0	X	6
Gangwon E (S. Kim / Y. Jeong) 🔨	4	0	1	1	1	0	5	X	12

== Final standings ==
Place	Team	Athletes
1st place, gold medalist(s)	Gangwon E	Kim Seon-yeong / Jeong Yeong-seok
2nd place, silver medalist(s)	Gangwon D	Kim Hye-rin / Yoo Min-hyeon
3rd place, bronze medalist(s)	Daegu B	Lee Hae-in / Kim Hong-geon
4	Gyeonggi A	Kim Min-ji / Jeong Byeong-jin
5	Gangwon C	Kim Su-jin / Kim Chang-min
5	Jeonbuk B	Shim Yu-jeong / Park Jin-hwan
5	Seoul A	Park You-been / Kim Jeong-min
5	Seoul C	Kim Ji-yoon / Lee Ki-jeong
9	Seoul B	Lee Eun-chae / Kim Min-woo
10	Seoul D	Yang Seung-hee / Lee Jae-beom
11	Gangwon A	Kim Kyeong-ae / Seong Ji-hoon
12	Uiseong	Bang Yu-jin / Kim Jin-hun
13	Jeonbuk C	Kim Ji-soo / Park Jong-hyeon
14	Gyeonggi C	Seol Ye-ji / Kim San
15	Gyeongbuk B	Park Seo-jin / Jeon Jae-ik
16	Gyeonggi B	Hwang Ye-ji / Park Hyo-ik
17	Gyeongbuk A	Kim Ye-ji / Park Seong-min
18	Chungbuk A	Lee Seong-rin / Cho Jang-yeon
19	Jeonbuk A	Kang Bo-bae / Lee Ki-bok
20	Chungbuk B	Kim Soo-bin / Park Kyung-ho
21	Gangwon B	Ha Seung-youn / Kim Hak-kyun
22	Daegu C	Kim Sur-yeong / Kwon Jun-i
23	Daegu A	Oh Ji-hyeon / Yoon Ji-hoo
24	Ulsan	Park Ye-rin / Choi Jeong-wook
25	Chungbuk C	Shin Eun-jin / Jeon Byeong-wook

== See also ==
- 2025 Korean Curling Championships
