= 2024 Canadian Open (November) =

Grand Slam of Curling event

2024 Co-op Canadian Open
- Host city: Nisku, Alberta
- Arena: Silent Ice Arena
- Dates: November 5–10
- Men's winner: (Scotland) Team Mouat
- Curling club: Curl Edinburgh, Edinburgh
- Skip: Bruce Mouat
- Third: Grant Hardie
- Second: Bobby Lammie
- Lead: Hammy McMillan Jr.
- Coach: Michael Goodfellow
- Finalist: (Newfoundland and Labrador) Brad Gushue
- Women's winner: (Ontario) Team Homan
- Curling club: Ottawa CC, Ottawa
- Skip: Rachel Homan
- Third: Tracy Fleury
- Second: Emma Miskew
- Lead: Sarah Wilkes
- Alternate: Rachelle Brown
- Finalist: (Switzerland) Silvana Tirinzoni

The 2024 Co-op Canadian Open was held from November 5 to 10 at the Silent Ice Arena in Nisku, Alberta. It was the second Grand Slam event and first major of the 2024–25 curling season.

In the women's final, Team Rachel Homan of Ottawa defeated Team Silvana Tirinzoni of Switzerland, 7–5. It was Homan's 16th career Slam. The team went undefeated at the event, which was held near Homan's adopted hometown of Beaumont, Alberta, and helped attract the event to the community.

In the men's final, Team Bruce Mouat of Scotland beat Team Brad Gushue from Newfoundland, 6–3. Mouat took early control of the game by scoring three in the first end and maintained the lead for the rest of the match. Team Mouat also went undefeated, going 7–0, and with the title, the team won their eighth grand slam.

Of note, the number four ranked Anna Hasselborg rink from Sweden did not compete in the event as they instead focused on training for the 2024 European Curling Championships. It was the first time the team did not participate in a Grand Slam event since the 2018 Tour Challenge.

== Qualification ==
The top 16 ranked men's and women's teams on the World Curling Federation's world team rankings as of October 8, 2024, qualified for the event. The Grand Slam of Curling may fill one spot in each division as a sponsor's exemption. In the event that a team declines their invitation, the next-ranked team on the world team ranking is invited until the field is complete.

=== Men ===
Top world team ranking men's teams:

1. (Scotland) Bruce Mouat
2. (Newfoundland and Labrador) Brad Gushue
3. (Italy) Joël Retornaz
4. (Switzerland) Yannick Schwaller
5. (Alberta) Brad Jacobs
6. (Scotland) Ross Whyte
7. (Sweden) Niklas Edin
8. (Saskatchewan) Mike McEwen
9. (Manitoba) Matt Dunstone
10. (Switzerland) Michael Brunner
11. (Scotland) James Craik
12. (United States) John Shuster
13. (Switzerland) Marco Hösli
14. (Manitoba) Reid Carruthers
15. (Alberta) Kevin Koe
16. (Saskatchewan) Rylan Kleiter

=== Women ===
Top world team ranking women's teams:

1. (Ontario) Rachel Homan
2. (Switzerland) Silvana Tirinzoni
3. (South Korea) Gim Eun-ji
4. (Sweden) ~~Anna Hasselborg~~
5. (Manitoba) Kerri Einarson
6. (South Korea) Kim Eun-jung
7. (Japan) Satsuki Fujisawa
8. (Italy) Stefania Constantini
9. (Manitoba) Chelsea Carey
10. (Sweden) Isabella Wranå
11. (Switzerland) Xenia Schwaller
12. (Manitoba) Kaitlyn Lawes
13. (Japan) Momoha Tabata
14. (Japan) Sayaka Yoshimura
15. (Japan) Ikue Kitazawa
16. (South Korea) Ha Seung-youn

Sponsor's Exemption:

- (Alberta) Selena Sturmay

== Men ==
=== Teams ===
The teams are listed as follows:

Skip	Third	Second	Lead	Locale
Michael Brunner	Anthony Petoud	Romano Meier	Andreas Gerlach	Bern, Switzerland
Reid Carruthers	Catlin Schneider	Derek Samagalski	Connor Njegovan	Winnipeg, Manitoba
James Craik	Mark Watt	Angus Bryce	Blair Haswell	Forfar, Scotland
Matt Dunstone	B. J. Neufeld	Colton Lott	Ryan Harnden	Winnipeg, Manitoba
Niklas Edin	Oskar Eriksson	Rasmus Wranå	Christoffer Sundgren	Karlstad, Sweden
Brad Gushue	Mark Nichols	Brendan Bottcher	Geoff Walker	St. John's, Newfoundland and Labrador
Philipp Hösli (Fourth)	Marco Hösli (Skip)	Simon Gloor	Justin Hausherr	Glarus, Switzerland
Brad Jacobs	Marc Kennedy	Brett Gallant	Ben Hebert	Calgary, Alberta
Rylan Kleiter	Joshua Mattern	Matthew Hall	Trevor Johnson	Saskatoon, Saskatchewan
Kevin Koe	Aaron Sluchinski	Tyler Tardi	Karrick Martin	Calgary, Alberta
Mike McEwen	Colton Flasch	Kevin Marsh	Dan Marsh	Saskatoon, Saskatchewan
Bruce Mouat	Grant Hardie	Bobby Lammie	Hammy McMillan Jr.	Edinburgh, Scotland
Joël Retornaz	Amos Mosaner	Sebastiano Arman	Mattia Giovanella	Trentino, Italy
Benoît Schwarz-van Berkel (Fourth)	Yannick Schwaller (Skip)	Sven Michel	Pablo Lachat	Geneva, Switzerland
John Shuster	Chris Plys	Colin Hufman	Matt Hamilton	(United States) Duluth, Minnesota
Ross Whyte	Robin Brydone	Duncan McFadzean	Euan Kyle	Stirling, Scotland

=== Round robin standings ===
Final Round Robin Standings

Key
Teams to Playoffs
Teams to Tiebreaker

Pool A	W	L	PF	PA	LSD
(Scotland) Bruce Mouat	4	0	28	13	96.5
(Saskatchewan) Mike McEwen	2	2	21	22	37.2
(Manitoba) Matt Dunstone	2	2	23	19	147.5
(Saskatchewan) Rylan Kleiter	0	4	10	27	185.2

Pool D	W	L	PF	PA	LSD
(Alberta) Brad Jacobs	3	1	19	15	20.1
(Switzerland) Yannick Schwaller	3	1	23	20	77.5
(Switzerland) Marco Hösli	2	2	21	13	172.8
(United States) John Shuster	0	4	15	31	148.8

Pool B	W	L	PF	PA	LSD
(Newfoundland and Labrador) Brad Gushue	4	0	26	12	113.3
(Sweden) Niklas Edin	3	1	28	18	90.6
(Alberta) Kevin Koe	1	3	14	27	161
(Switzerland) Michael Brunner	0	4	18	27	48.1

Pool C	W	L	PF	PA	LSD
(Italy) Joël Retornaz	3	1	25	18	29.7
(Scotland) Ross Whyte	3	1	21	15	41.3
(Scotland) James Craik	1	3	18	21	61.8
(Manitoba) Reid Carruthers	1	3	13	25	78.3

=== Round robin results ===
All draw times are listed in Mountain Time (UTC−07:00).

==== Draw 1 ====
Tuesday, November 5, 8:00 am

Sheet A	1	2	3	4	5	6	7	8	Final
(Scotland) Ross Whyte	1	0	3	2	0	1	0	X	7
(Switzerland) Michael Brunner 🔨	0	2	0	0	2	0	0	X	4

Sheet B	1	2	3	4	5	6	7	8	Final
(Sweden) Niklas Edin 🔨	3	0	3	0	2	X	X	X	8
(Scotland) James Craik	0	1	0	2	0	X	X	X	3

Sheet C	1	2	3	4	5	6	7	8	Final
(Italy) Joël Retornaz 🔨	0	1	0	3	0	0	2	2	8
(Alberta) Kevin Koe	0	0	2	0	0	1	0	0	3

Sheet D	1	2	3	4	5	6	7	8	Final
(Newfoundland and Labrador) Brad Gushue 🔨	0	2	0	0	1	3	X	X	6
(Manitoba) Reid Carruthers	0	0	0	1	0	0	X	X	1

==== Draw 3 ====
Tuesday, November 5, 3:00 pm

Sheet A	1	2	3	4	5	6	7	8	Final
(Alberta) Brad Jacobs 🔨	0	0	2	0	0	0	2	X	4
(Manitoba) Matt Dunstone	0	0	0	2	0	0	0	X	2

Sheet B	1	2	3	4	5	6	7	8	Final
(Switzerland) Yannick Schwaller 🔨	0	2	0	1	0	1	2	X	6
(Saskatchewan) Rylan Kleiter	0	0	1	0	1	0	0	X	2

Sheet C	1	2	3	4	5	6	7	8	Final
(Saskatchewan) Mike McEwen 🔨	4	0	1	0	2	2	X	X	9
(United States) John Shuster	0	1	0	2	0	0	X	X	3

Sheet D	1	2	3	4	5	6	7	8	Final
(Scotland) Bruce Mouat 🔨	1	0	0	2	0	2	0	0	5
(Switzerland) Marco Hösli	0	0	1	0	1	0	1	1	4

==== Draw 6 ====
Wednesday, November 6, 12:00 pm

Sheet A	1	2	3	4	5	6	7	8	Final
(Scotland) Bruce Mouat 🔨	1	0	2	2	0	3	X	X	8
(Saskatchewan) Rylan Kleiter	0	0	0	0	1	0	X	X	1

Sheet B	1	2	3	4	5	6	7	8	Final
(Italy) Joël Retornaz 🔨	3	0	0	3	0	1	1	X	8
(Manitoba) Reid Carruthers	0	1	1	0	2	0	0	X	4

Sheet C	1	2	3	4	5	6	7	8	Final
(Sweden) Niklas Edin 🔨	0	1	0	2	0	5	0	X	8
(Switzerland) Michael Brunner	1	0	2	0	1	0	2	X	6

Sheet D	1	2	3	4	5	6	7	8	Final
(Scotland) Ross Whyte	0	1	0	3	0	0	1	X	5
(Scotland) James Craik 🔨	0	0	1	0	1	0	0	X	2

==== Draw 8 ====
Wednesday, November 6, 8:00 pm

Sheet A	1	2	3	4	5	6	7	8	Final
(Newfoundland and Labrador) Brad Gushue 🔨	2	3	0	1	0	2	X	X	8
(Alberta) Kevin Koe	0	0	1	0	1	0	X	X	2

Sheet B	1	2	3	4	5	6	7	8	Final
(Saskatchewan) Mike McEwen	0	2	0	1	1	0	X	X	4
(Manitoba) Matt Dunstone 🔨	2	0	1	0	0	5	X	X	8

Sheet C	1	2	3	4	5	6	7	8	Final
(Switzerland) Yannick Schwaller	0	0	1	0	0	X	X	X	1
(Switzerland) Marco Hösli 🔨	2	1	0	1	4	X	X	X	8

Sheet D	1	2	3	4	5	6	7	8	Final
(Alberta) Brad Jacobs 🔨	0	1	0	3	4	X	X	X	8
(United States) John Shuster	0	0	2	0	0	X	X	X	2

==== Draw 10 ====
Thursday, November 7, 12:00 pm

Sheet A	1	2	3	4	5	6	7	8	9	Final
(Switzerland) Yannick Schwaller	0	3	2	0	0	0	2	0	1	8
(United States) John Shuster 🔨	1	0	0	2	1	1	0	2	0	7

Sheet B	1	2	3	4	5	6	7	8	Final
(Alberta) Brad Jacobs 🔨	0	1	0	0	1	0	0	2	4
(Switzerland) Marco Hösli	0	0	0	2	0	1	0	0	3

Sheet C	1	2	3	4	5	6	7	8	Final
(Scotland) Bruce Mouat	0	3	0	2	2	0	X	X	7
(Saskatchewan) Mike McEwen 🔨	1	0	1	0	0	1	X	X	3

Sheet D	1	2	3	4	5	6	7	8	Final
(Manitoba) Matt Dunstone 🔨	2	0	1	1	1	0	3	X	8
(Saskatchewan) Rylan Kleiter	0	1	0	0	0	2	0	X	3

==== Draw 12 ====
Thursday, November 7, 8:00 pm

Sheet A	1	2	3	4	5	6	7	8	Final
(Italy) Joël Retornaz	0	0	0	1	0	1	0	X	2
(Scotland) James Craik 🔨	1	0	1	0	3	0	3	X	8

Sheet B	1	2	3	4	5	6	7	8	Final
(Scotland) Ross Whyte 🔨	2	0	0	4	0	0	X	X	6
(Manitoba) Reid Carruthers	0	0	1	0	0	1	X	X	2

Sheet C	1	2	3	4	5	6	7	8	Final
(Newfoundland and Labrador) Brad Gushue 🔨	0	1	0	0	1	0	3	0	5
(Sweden) Niklas Edin	0	0	0	0	0	2	0	2	4

Sheet D	1	2	3	4	5	6	7	8	Final
(Switzerland) Michael Brunner	0	0	1	1	0	0	0	1	3
(Alberta) Kevin Koe 🔨	2	0	0	0	2	0	1	0	5

==== Draw 14 ====
Friday, November 8, 12:00 pm

Sheet A	1	2	3	4	5	6	7	8	9	Final
(Saskatchewan) Mike McEwen 🔨	1	0	0	0	2	0	1	0	1	5
(Saskatchewan) Rylan Kleiter	0	1	0	1	0	1	0	1	0	4

Sheet B	1	2	3	4	5	6	7	8	Final
(Scotland) Bruce Mouat	0	1	0	2	0	1	0	4	8
(Manitoba) Matt Dunstone 🔨	0	0	3	0	1	0	1	0	5

Sheet C	1	2	3	4	5	6	7	8	Final
(United States) John Shuster	0	0	2	0	0	1	0	1	4
(Switzerland) Marco Hösli 🔨	1	0	0	1	1	0	3	0	6

Sheet D	1	2	3	4	5	6	7	8	Final
(Switzerland) Yannick Schwaller 🔨	1	0	1	1	3	0	2	X	8
(Alberta) Brad Jacobs	0	1	0	0	0	2	0	X	3

==== Draw 16 ====
Friday, November 8, 8:00 pm

Sheet A	1	2	3	4	5	6	7	8	Final
(Sweden) Niklas Edin 🔨	3	1	0	2	0	0	2	X	8
(Alberta) Kevin Koe	0	0	1	0	2	1	0	X	4

Sheet B	1	2	3	4	5	6	7	8	Final
(Newfoundland and Labrador) Brad Gushue 🔨	1	0	2	0	0	0	2	2	7
(Switzerland) Michael Brunner	0	2	0	1	1	1	0	0	5

Sheet C	1	2	3	4	5	6	7	8	9	Final
(Scotland) James Craik 🔨	0	0	2	0	3	0	0	0	0	5
(Manitoba) Reid Carruthers	0	1	0	2	0	1	0	1	1	6

Sheet D	1	2	3	4	5	6	7	8	Final
(Italy) Joël Retornaz 🔨	0	1	0	1	0	0	2	3	7
(Scotland) Ross Whyte	0	0	1	0	2	0	0	0	3

=== Tiebreaker ===
Saturday, November 9, 8:30 am

Sheet A	1	2	3	4	5	6	7	8	Final
(Saskatchewan) Mike McEwen	0	1	1	0	2	0	1	0	5
(Manitoba) Matt Dunstone 🔨	2	0	0	3	0	1	0	1	7

Player percentages
(Saskatchewan) Team McEwen		(Manitoba) Team Dunstone	
Dan Marsh	92%	Ryan Harnden	98%
Kevin Marsh	84%	Colton Lott	95%
Colton Flasch	72%	B. J. Neufeld	97%
Mike McEwen	89%	Matt Dunstone	84%
Total	84%	Total	94%

=== Playoffs ===
Quarterfinals
1	(Scotland) Bruce Mouat	6
8	(Manitoba) Matt Dunstone	3
4	(Italy) Joël Retornaz	5
5	(Scotland) Ross Whyte	4
2	(Newfoundland and Labrador) Brad Gushue	6
7	(Sweden) Niklas Edin	5
3	(Alberta) Brad Jacobs	1
6	(Switzerland) Yannick Schwaller	6

Semifinals
1	(Scotland) Bruce Mouat	4
4	(Italy) Joël Retornaz	2
2	(Newfoundland and Labrador) Brad Gushue	6
6	(Switzerland) Yannick Schwaller	2

Final
1	(Scotland) Bruce Mouat	6
2	(Newfoundland and Labrador) Brad Gushue	3

==== Quarterfinals ====
Saturday, November 9, 4:00 pm

Sheet A	1	2	3	4	5	6	7	8	Final
(Italy) Joël Retornaz 🔨	0	2	0	0	1	1	1	0	5
(Scotland) Ross Whyte	1	0	1	1	0	0	0	1	4

Player percentages
(Italy) Team Retornaz		(Scotland) Team Whyte	
Mattia Giovanella	100%	Euan Kyle	91%
Sebastiano Arman	83%	Duncan McFadzean	89%
Amos Mosaner	92%	Robin Brydone	88%
Joël Retornaz	73%	Ross Whyte	72%
Total	87%	Total	85%

Sheet B	1	2	3	4	5	6	7	8	Final
(Alberta) Brad Jacobs	0	0	0	1	0	0	X	X	1
(Switzerland) Yannick Schwaller 🔨	0	0	1	0	3	2	X	X	6

Player percentages
(Alberta) Team Jacobs		(Switzerland) Team Schwaller	
Ben Hebert	100%	Pablo Lachat	94%
Brett Gallant	94%	Sven Michel	90%
Marc Kennedy	96%	Yannick Schwaller	77%
Brad Jacobs	69%	Benoît Schwarz-van Berkel	96%
Total	90%	Total	89%

Sheet C	1	2	3	4	5	6	7	8	9	Final
(Newfoundland and Labrador) Brad Gushue 🔨	2	0	1	0	1	0	1	0	1	6
(Sweden) Niklas Edin	0	1	0	1	0	2	0	1	0	5

Player percentages
(Newfoundland and Labrador) Team Gushue		(Sweden) Team Edin	
Geoff Walker	94%	Christoffer Sundgren	97%
Brendan Bottcher	78%	Rasmus Wranå	78%
Mark Nichols	94%	Oskar Eriksson	90%
Brad Gushue	90%	Niklas Edin	81%
Total	89%	Total	86%

Sheet D	1	2	3	4	5	6	7	8	Final
(Scotland) Bruce Mouat 🔨	1	0	1	2	1	0	1	X	6
(Manitoba) Matt Dunstone	0	1	0	0	0	2	0	X	3

Player percentages
(Scotland) Team Mouat		(Manitoba) Team Dunstone	
Hammy McMillan Jr.	95%	Ryan Harnden	93%
Bobby Lammie	86%	Colton Lott	89%
Grant Hardie	88%	B. J. Neufeld	79%
Bruce Mouat	84%	Matt Dunstone	80%
Total	88%	Total	85%

==== Semifinals ====
Saturday, November 9, 8:00 pm

Sheet A	1	2	3	4	5	6	7	8	Final
(Newfoundland and Labrador) Brad Gushue 🔨	0	1	1	1	0	3	X	X	6
(Switzerland) Yannick Schwaller	0	0	0	0	2	0	X	X	2

Player percentages
(Newfoundland and Labrador) Team Gushue		(Switzerland) Team Schwaller	
Geoff Walker	100%	Pablo Lachat	95%
Brendan Bottcher	98%	Sven Michel	80%
Mark Nichols	93%	Yannick Schwaller	98%
Brad Gushue	91%	Benoît Schwarz-van Berkel	62%
Total	96%	Total	84%

Sheet B	1	2	3	4	5	6	7	8	Final
(Scotland) Bruce Mouat 🔨	2	0	0	1	0	1	0	X	4
(Italy) Joël Retornaz	0	0	0	0	0	0	2	X	2

Player percentages
(Scotland) Team Mouat		(Italy) Team Retornaz	
Hammy McMillan Jr.	98%	Mattia Giovanella	98%
Bobby Lammie	97%	Sebastiano Arman	91%
Grant Hardie	98%	Amos Mosaner	94%
Bruce Mouat	100%	Joël Retornaz	88%
Total	98%	Total	93%

==== Final ====
Sunday, November 10, 2:30 pm

Sheet B	1	2	3	4	5	6	7	8	Final
(Scotland) Bruce Mouat 🔨	3	0	1	0	2	0	0	X	6
(Newfoundland and Labrador) Brad Gushue	0	1	0	1	0	0	1	X	3

Player percentages
(Scotland) Team Mouat		(Newfoundland and Labrador) Team Gushue	
Hammy McMillan Jr.	96%	Geoff Walker	98%
Bobby Lammie	100%	Brendan Bottcher	73%
Grant Hardie	98%	Mark Nichols	93%
Bruce Mouat	98%	Brad Gushue	86%
Total	98%	Total	88%

== Women ==
=== Teams ===
The teams are listed as follows:

Skip	Third	Second	Lead	Alternate	Locale
Chelsea Carey	Karlee Burgess	Lindsey Burgess (Note: Lindsey Burgess spared for Emily Zacharias.)	Lauren Lenentine		Winnipeg, Manitoba
Stefania Constantini	Giulia Zardini Lacedelli	Elena Mathis	Marta Lo Deserto	Angela Romei	Cortina d'Ampezzo, Italy
Kerri Einarson	Val Sweeting	Joanne Courtney (Note: Joanne Courtney replaced Shannon Birchard who was recovering from a knee injury.)	Krysten Karwacki		Gimli, Manitoba
Satsuki Fujisawa	Chinami Yoshida	Yumi Suzuki	Yurika Yoshida		Kitami, Japan
Gim Eun-ji	Kim Min-ji	Kim Su-ji	Seol Ye-eun	Seol Ye-ji	Uijeongbu, South Korea
Ha Seung-youn	Kim Hye-rin	Yang Tae-i	Kim Su-jin	Park Seo-jin	Chuncheon, South Korea
Rachel Homan	Tracy Fleury	Emma Miskew	Sarah Wilkes	Rachelle Brown	Ottawa, Ontario
Kim Eun-jung	Kim Kyeong-ae	Kim Cho-hi	Kim Seon-yeong		Gangneung, South Korea
Ikue Kitazawa	Seina Nakajima	Ami Enami	Minori Suzuki	Hasumi Ishigooka	Nagano, Japan
Selena Njegovan	Jocelyn Peterman	Becca Hebert (Note: Alternate Becca Hebert spared for Kaitlyn Lawes who was on maternity leave. She played second while Jocelyn Peterman and Selena Njegovan moved up to third and skip respectively.)	Kristin Gordon		Winnipeg, Manitoba
Xenia Schwaller	Selina Gafner	Fabienne Rieder	Selina Rychiger		Zurich, Switzerland
Selena Sturmay	Danielle Schmiemann	Dezaray Hawes	Paige Papley		Edmonton, Alberta
Momoha Tabata (Fourth)	Miku Nihira (Skip)	Sae Yamamoto	Mikoto Nakajima	Ayami Ito	Sapporo, Japan
Alina Pätz (Fourth)	Silvana Tirinzoni (Skip)	Carole Howald	Selina Witschonke		Aarau, Switzerland
Isabella Wranå	Almida de Val	Maria Larsson	Linda Stenlund		Sundbyberg, Sweden
Sayaka Yoshimura	Yuna Kotani	Kaho Onodera	Anna Ohmiya	Mina Kobayashi	Sapporo, Japan

=== Round robin standings ===
Final Round Robin Standings

Key
Teams to Playoffs
Teams to Tiebreakers

Pool A	W	L	PF	PA	LSD
(Ontario) Rachel Homan	4	0	24	14	45.4
(Alberta) Selena Sturmay	2	2	24	18	31.3
(Manitoba) Chelsea Carey	2	2	20	25	65.1
(Sweden) Isabella Wranå	1	3	17	29	62.6

Pool D	W	L	PF	PA	LSD
(South Korea) Kim Eun-jung	3	1	27	19	35.2
(Japan) Sayaka Yoshimura	2	2	20	21	70.1
(Manitoba) Kerri Einarson	2	2	26	19	185.8
(Japan) Team Tabata	0	4	16	29	215.9

Pool B	W	L	PF	PA	LSD
(Italy) Stefania Constantini	3	1	25	16	34.5
(South Korea) Ha Seung-youn	3	1	27	18	122.4
(Switzerland) Silvana Tirinzoni	2	2	21	21	100.4
(Switzerland) Xenia Schwaller	1	3	17	23	68.8

Pool C	W	L	PF	PA	LSD
(Japan) Satsuki Fujisawa	3	1	27	18	88.2
(Manitoba) Team Lawes	2	2	20	24	112.2
(South Korea) Gim Eun-ji	1	3	19	31	104.7
(Japan) Ikue Kitazawa	1	3	23	28	200.4

=== Round robin results ===
All draw times are listed in Mountain Time (UTC−07:00).

==== Draw 2 ====
Tuesday, November 5, 11:30 am

Sheet A	1	2	3	4	5	6	7	8	Final
(Japan) Satsuki Fujisawa 🔨	0	0	2	0	1	1	0	0	4
(Switzerland) Xenia Schwaller	0	1	0	0	0	0	1	1	3

Sheet B	1	2	3	4	5	6	7	8	Final
(Italy) Stefania Constantini 🔨	1	1	0	3	1	0	1	X	7
(Manitoba) Team Lawes	0	0	2	0	0	1	0	X	3

Sheet C	1	2	3	4	5	6	7	8	Final
(South Korea) Gim Eun-ji	0	3	0	0	0	0	X	X	3
(South Korea) Ha Seung-youn 🔨	4	0	3	1	1	1	X	X	10

Sheet D	1	2	3	4	5	6	7	8	Final
(Switzerland) Silvana Tirinzoni 🔨	2	0	1	0	0	1	0	2	6
(Japan) Ikue Kitazawa	0	1	0	1	0	0	2	0	4

==== Draw 4 ====
Tuesday, November 5, 6:30 pm

Sheet A	1	2	3	4	5	6	7	8	Final
(South Korea) Kim Eun-jung 🔨	3	0	0	0	2	0	0	0	5
(Sweden) Isabella Wranå	0	0	2	1	0	2	1	1	7

Sheet B	1	2	3	4	5	6	7	8	Final
(Manitoba) Kerri Einarson	2	3	0	0	2	2	X	X	9
(Alberta) Selena Sturmay 🔨	0	0	1	2	0	0	X	X	3

Sheet C	1	2	3	4	5	6	7	8	Final
(Manitoba) Chelsea Carey 🔨	1	0	0	2	1	1	0	2	7
(Japan) Team Tabata	0	2	1	0	0	0	3	0	6

Sheet D	1	2	3	4	5	6	7	8	Final
(Ontario) Rachel Homan 🔨	2	0	1	0	0	0	2	1	6
(Japan) Sayaka Yoshimura	0	1	0	0	2	1	0	0	4

==== Draw 5 ====
Wednesday, November 6, 8:30 am

Sheet A	1	2	3	4	5	6	7	8	Final
(Italy) Stefania Constantini 🔨	2	0	1	0	0	1	1	2	7
(South Korea) Ha Seung-youn	0	1	0	1	1	0	0	0	3

Sheet B	1	2	3	4	5	6	7	8	Final
(Switzerland) Silvana Tirinzoni	0	2	0	1	0	1	1	0	5
(Switzerland) Xenia Schwaller 🔨	1	0	2	0	1	0	0	2	6

Sheet C	1	2	3	4	5	6	7	8	Final
(Manitoba) Team Lawes 🔨	2	0	0	2	0	1	0	1	6
(Japan) Ikue Kitazawa	0	0	1	0	2	0	1	0	4

Sheet D	1	2	3	4	5	6	7	8	Final
(South Korea) Gim Eun-ji 🔨	1	0	0	0	1	0	X	X	2
(Japan) Satsuki Fujisawa	0	2	1	2	0	3	X	X	8

==== Draw 7 ====
Wednesday, November 6, 4:00 pm

Sheet A	1	2	3	4	5	6	7	8	Final
(Ontario) Rachel Homan	0	1	0	1	0	1	0	1	4
(Alberta) Selena Sturmay 🔨	1	0	0	0	1	0	1	0	3

Sheet B	1	2	3	4	5	6	7	8	Final
(Manitoba) Chelsea Carey	0	2	0	3	4	X	X	X	9
(Sweden) Isabella Wranå 🔨	1	0	1	0	0	X	X	X	2

Sheet C	1	2	3	4	5	6	7	8	Final
(Manitoba) Kerri Einarson	0	0	0	2	0	0	2	0	4
(Japan) Sayaka Yoshimura 🔨	0	2	0	0	1	0	0	3	6

Sheet D	1	2	3	4	5	6	7	8	9	Final
(South Korea) Kim Eun-jung 🔨	0	1	0	1	0	1	1	1	1	6
(Japan) Team Tabata	2	0	1	0	2	0	0	0	0	5

==== Draw 9 ====
Thursday, November 7, 8:30 am

Sheet A	1	2	3	4	5	6	7	8	Final
(Manitoba) Kerri Einarson 🔨	0	1	1	2	0	5	X	X	9
(Japan) Team Tabata	0	0	0	0	1	0	X	X	1

Sheet B	1	2	3	4	5	6	7	8	Final
(South Korea) Kim Eun-jung 🔨	2	1	0	3	0	1	0	X	7
(Japan) Sayaka Yoshimura	0	0	1	0	1	0	1	X	3

Sheet C	1	2	3	4	5	6	7	8	Final
(Ontario) Rachel Homan 🔨	0	3	0	2	1	0	3	X	9
(Manitoba) Chelsea Carey	0	0	1	0	0	2	0	X	3

Sheet D	1	2	3	4	5	6	7	8	Final
(Sweden) Isabella Wranå	0	1	0	1	0	2	0	X	4
(Alberta) Selena Sturmay 🔨	2	0	2	0	2	0	4	X	10

==== Draw 11 ====
Thursday, November 7, 4:00 pm

Sheet A	1	2	3	4	5	6	7	8	Final
(South Korea) Gim Eun-ji 🔨	0	0	3	2	1	1	1	X	8
(Manitoba) Team Lawes	0	4	0	0	0	0	0	X	4

Sheet B	1	2	3	4	5	6	7	8	Final
(Japan) Satsuki Fujisawa 🔨	2	2	0	4	0	2	0	X	10
(Japan) Ikue Kitazawa	0	0	2	0	3	0	1	X	6

Sheet C	1	2	3	4	5	6	7	8	Final
(Switzerland) Silvana Tirinzoni	0	2	0	0	2	0	0	2	6
(Italy) Stefania Constantini 🔨	1	0	0	1	0	1	1	0	4

Sheet D	1	2	3	4	5	6	7	8	Final
(Switzerland) Xenia Schwaller	0	0	0	2	1	0	1	0	4
(South Korea) Ha Seung-youn 🔨	0	2	3	0	0	1	0	1	7

==== Draw 13 ====
Friday, November 8, 8:30 am

Sheet A	1	2	3	4	5	6	7	8	Final
(Manitoba) Chelsea Carey	0	0	0	0	1	X	X	X	1
(Alberta) Selena Sturmay 🔨	0	1	4	3	0	X	X	X	8

Sheet B	1	2	3	4	5	6	7	8	Final
(Italy) Stefania Constantini	0	1	1	1	0	4	0	X	7
(Switzerland) Xenia Schwaller 🔨	1	0	0	0	2	0	1	X	4

Sheet C	1	2	3	4	5	6	7	8	Final
(Japan) Team Tabata 🔨	0	2	0	0	1	0	1	0	4
(Japan) Sayaka Yoshimura	1	0	2	1	0	2	0	1	7

Sheet D	1	2	3	4	5	6	7	8	Final
(Manitoba) Kerri Einarson	0	2	0	0	2	0	X	X	4
(South Korea) Kim Eun-jung 🔨	4	0	2	2	0	1	X	X	9

==== Draw 15 ====
Friday, November 8, 4:00 pm

Sheet A	1	2	3	4	5	6	7	8	Final
(Switzerland) Silvana Tirinzoni 🔨	1	0	2	0	0	1	0	0	4
(South Korea) Ha Seung-youn	0	2	0	0	2	0	2	1	7

Sheet B	1	2	3	4	5	6	7	8	Final
(Ontario) Rachel Homan	0	1	0	1	0	1	0	2	5
(Sweden) Isabella Wranå 🔨	1	0	0	0	1	0	2	0	4

Sheet C	1	2	3	4	5	6	7	8	Final
(South Korea) Gim Eun-ji 🔨	2	0	1	0	3	0	0	0	6
(Japan) Ikue Kitazawa	0	2	0	4	0	1	1	1	9

Sheet D	1	2	3	4	5	6	7	8	Final
(Japan) Satsuki Fujisawa 🔨	2	0	2	0	0	1	0	0	5
(Manitoba) Team Lawes	0	2	0	2	0	0	1	2	7

=== Tiebreakers ===
Saturday, November 9, 8:30 am

Sheet B	1	2	3	4	5	6	7	8	Final
(Manitoba) Chelsea Carey 🔨	0	1	1	0	1	0	0	1	4
(Manitoba) Team Lawes	0	0	0	2	0	1	0	0	3

Player percentages
(Manitoba) Team Carey		(Manitoba) Team Lawes	
Lauren Lenentine	91%	Kristin Gordon	96%
Lindsey Burgess	77%	Becca Hebert	84%
Karlee Burgess	73%	Jocelyn Peterman	94%
Chelsea Carey	85%	Selena Njegovan	80%
Total	81%	Total	88%

Sheet C	1	2	3	4	5	6	7	8	Final
(Alberta) Selena Sturmay 🔨	2	0	1	0	2	0	1	0	6
(Manitoba) Kerri Einarson	0	4	0	1	0	1	0	2	8

Player percentages
(Alberta) Team Sturmay		(Manitoba) Team Einarson	
Paige Papley	80%	Krysten Karwacki	91%
Dezaray Hawes	91%	Joanne Courtney	91%
Danielle Schmiemann	77%	Val Sweeting	81%
Selena Sturmay	86%	Kerri Einarson	84%
Total	83%	Total	87%

Sheet D	1	2	3	4	5	6	7	8	Final
(Japan) Sayaka Yoshimura	0	0	1	1	0	0	0	X	2
(Switzerland) Silvana Tirinzoni 🔨	1	1	0	0	0	2	2	X	6

Player percentages
(Japan) Team Yoshimura		(Switzerland) Team Tirinzoni	
Anna Ohmiya	82%	Selina Witschonke	95%
Kaho Onodera	77%	Carole Howald	82%
Yuna Kotani	82%	Silvana Tirinzoni	80%
Sayaka Yoshimura	79%	Alina Pätz	88%
Total	80%	Total	86%

=== Playoffs ===
Quarterfinals
1	(Ontario) Rachel Homan	7
8	(Manitoba) Kerri Einarson	5
4	(Japan) Satsuki Fujisawa	4
5	(South Korea) Ha Seung-youn	6
2	(Italy) Stefania Constantini	4
7	(Switzerland) Silvana Tirinzoni	7
3	(South Korea) Kim Eun-jung	8
6	(Manitoba) Chelsea Carey	5

Semifinals
1	(Ontario) Rachel Homan	6
5	(South Korea) Ha Seung-youn	2
7	(Switzerland) Silvana Tirinzoni	5
3	(South Korea) Kim Eun-jung	4

Final
1	(Ontario) Rachel Homan	7
7	(Switzerland) Silvana Tirinzoni	5

==== Quarterfinals ====
Saturday, November 9, 12:00 pm

Sheet A	1	2	3	4	5	6	7	8	Final
(Ontario) Rachel Homan 🔨	3	0	2	0	1	0	1	X	7
(Manitoba) Kerri Einarson	0	1	0	2	0	2	0	X	5

Player percentages
(Ontario) Team Homan		(Manitoba) Team Einarson	
Sarah Wilkes	97%	Krysten Karwacki	95%
Emma Miskew	91%	Joanne Courtney	81%
Tracy Fleury	97%	Val Sweeting	91%
Rachel Homan	92%	Kerri Einarson	85%
Total	94%	Total	88%

Sheet B	1	2	3	4	5	6	7	8	Final
(South Korea) Kim Eun-jung 🔨	1	0	3	0	1	0	0	3	8
(Manitoba) Chelsea Carey	0	1	0	1	0	2	1	0	5

Player percentages
(South Korea) Team Kim		(Manitoba) Team Carey	
Kim Seon-yeong	94%	Lauren Lenentine	94%
Kim Cho-hi	89%	Lindsey Burgess	91%
Kim Kyeong-ae	95%	Karlee Burgess	92%
Kim Eun-jung	77%	Chelsea Carey	89%
Total	89%	Total	92%

Sheet C	1	2	3	4	5	6	7	8	Final
(Italy) Stefania Constantini 🔨	0	1	0	0	2	0	1	0	4
(Switzerland) Silvana Tirinzoni	0	0	1	1	0	1	0	4	7

Player percentages
(Italy) Team Constantini		(Switzerland) Team Tirinzoni	
Marta Lo Deserto	92%	Selina Witschonke	86%
Elena Mathis	83%	Carole Howald	81%
Giulia Zardini Lacedelli	75%	Silvana Tirinzoni	89%
Stefania Constantini	77%	Alina Pätz	84%
Total	82%	Total	85%

Sheet D	1	2	3	4	5	6	7	8	Final
(Japan) Satsuki Fujisawa	0	1	0	1	0	2	0	0	4
(South Korea) Ha Seung-youn 🔨	1	0	2	0	1	0	0	2	6

Player percentages
(Japan) Team Fujisawa		(South Korea) Team Ha	
Yurika Yoshida	84%	Kim Su-jin	77%
Yumi Suzuki	70%	Yang Tae-i	84%
Chinami Yoshida	66%	Kim Hye-rin	80%
Satsuki Fujisawa	83%	Ha Seung-youn	80%
Total	76%	Total	80%

==== Semifinals ====
Saturday, November 9, 8:00 pm

Sheet C	1	2	3	4	5	6	7	8	Final
(Ontario) Rachel Homan 🔨	3	0	0	0	3	0	X	X	6
(South Korea) Ha Seung-youn	0	0	0	1	0	1	X	X	2

Player percentages
(Ontario) Team Homan		(South Korea) Team Ha	
Sarah Wilkes	96%	Kim Su-jin	92%
Emma Miskew	81%	Yang Tae-i	83%
Tracy Fleury	92%	Kim Hye-rin	75%
Rachel Homan	88%	Ha Seung-youn	73%
Total	89%	Total	81%

Sheet D	1	2	3	4	5	6	7	8	Final
(Switzerland) Silvana Tirinzoni	0	1	0	0	3	0	0	1	5
(South Korea) Kim Eun-jung 🔨	1	0	2	0	0	0	1	0	4

Player percentages
(Switzerland) Team Tirinzoni		(South Korea) Team Kim	
Selina Witschonke	95%	Kim Seon-yeong	97%
Carole Howald	84%	Kim Cho-hi	72%
Silvana Tirinzoni	84%	Kim Kyeong-ae	81%
Alina Pätz	95%	Kim Eun-jung	75%
Total	90%	Total	81%

==== Final ====
Sunday, November 10, 10:00 am

Sheet B	1	2	3	4	5	6	7	8	Final
(Ontario) Rachel Homan 🔨	2	0	0	3	1	0	1	0	7
(Switzerland) Silvana Tirinzoni	0	2	1	0	0	2	0	0	5

Player percentages
(Ontario) Team Homan		(Switzerland) Team Tirinzoni	
Sarah Wilkes	98%	Selina Witschonke	98%
Emma Miskew	88%	Carole Howald	95%
Tracy Fleury	89%	Silvana Tirinzoni	84%
Rachel Homan	89%	Alina Pätz	72%
Total	91%	Total	88%
