= 2025 Korean Curling Championships =

- Host city: Uijeongbu, South Korea
- Arena: Uijeongbu Curling Stadium
- Dates: June 19–27
- Men's winner: Gyeongbuk Sports Council
- Curling club: Uiseong CC, Uiseong
- Skip: Kim Soo-hyuk
- Third: Kim Chang-min
- Second: Yoo Min-hyeon
- Lead: Kim Hak-kyun
- Alternate: Jeon Jae-ik
- Coach: Yoon So-min
- Finalist: Seoul City Hall (Lee)
- Women's winner: Gyeonggi Province
- Curling club: Uijeongbu CC, Uijeongbu
- Skip: Gim Eun-ji
- Third: Kim Min-ji
- Second: Kim Su-ji
- Lead: Seol Ye-eun
- Alternate: Seol Ye-ji
- Coach: Shin Dong-ho
- Finalist: Chuncheon City Hall (Ha)

The 2025 Korean Curling Championships, South Korea's national curling championships, were held from June 19 to 27 at the Uijeongbu Curling Stadium in Uijeongbu, South Korea. The winning teams on both the men's and women's sides became the South Korean National Teams for the 2025–26 curling season. They represented South Korea at the 2025 Pan Continental Curling Championships and later the 2026 World Curling Championships. The winning Gim Eun-ji women's team also qualified directly for the 2026 Winter Olympics while the Kim Soo-hyuk men's team competed in the Olympic Qualification Event to try to secure qualification. Both the men's and women's events were played in a round robin format which qualified four teams for the page playoffs.

Despite winning the 2024 championship, the men's champions from Uiseong-gun Office did not stay together with skip Lee Jae-beom leaving the team before the 2025 World Men's Curling Championship. Third Kim Hyo-jun took over as skip, with Lee forming a new team out of Seoul. He replaced Jeong Byeong-jin on the top ranked team in the country, while third Lee Ki-jeong returned to competitive play for the first time since the 2021–22 season. Both 2024 silver and bronze medalists Gangwon Province and Gyeongbuk Sports Council kept their lineups intact, rounding out the top four seeded men's teams.

There were no changes to the top ranked women's squads with Gyeonggi Province, Gangneung City Hall and Chuncheon City Hall all entering the event ranked within the top ten in the world. During their season as national champions, Gyeonggi's Gim Eun-ji rink won gold at the 2025 Asian Winter Games, silver at the 2024 Pan Continental Curling Championships and finished fourth at the 2025 World Women's Curling Championship. However, it was Gangneung's Kim Eun-jung rink who entered the event as the top ranked team, reaching four consecutive Grand Slam of Curling semifinals across the 2024–25 season. Jeonbuk's Kang Bo-bae also entered as a contender after winning the 2025 World Junior Curling Championships.

== Medalists ==
	Gold	Silver	Bronze
Men	Gyeongbuk Sports Council; Kim Soo-hyuk; Kim Chang-min; Yoo Min-hyeon; Kim Hak-kyun; Jeon Jae-ik	Seoul City Hall; Lee Jae-beom; Lee Ki-jeong; Kim Min-woo; Kim Jeong-min	Uiseong-gun Office; Kim Hyo-jun; Kim Eun-bin; Pyo Jeong-min; Kim Jin-hun
Women	Gyeonggi Province; Gim Eun-ji; Kim Min-ji; Kim Su-ji; Seol Ye-eun; Seol Ye-ji	Chuncheon City Hall; Ha Seung-youn; Kim Hye-rin; Yang Tae-i; Kim Su-jin; Park Seo-jin	Jeonbuk Province; Kang Bo-bae; Shim Yu-jeong; Kim Min-seo; Kim Ji-soo; Lee Bo-yeong

== Men ==
=== Teams ===
The teams are listed as follows:

Team	Skip	Third	Second	Lead	Alternate	Locale
Chungnam	Yoo Jin-han	Jang Moon-ik	Lee Sung-kon	Kim Sang-hyeon		Chungnam
Gangwon Province	Park Jong-duk	Jeong Yeong-seok	Oh Seung-hoon	Lee Ki-bok	Seong Ji-hoon	Gangwon
Gyeongbuk Sports Council	Kim Soo-hyuk	Kim Chang-min	Yoo Min-hyeon	Kim Hak-kyun	Jeon Jae-ik	Uiseong
Kwandong University	Kim Hak-jun	Moon Si-woo	Park Jin-hwan	Kim Myeong-jun	Park Jong-hyeon	Gangneung
Kyungil University	Kim Dae-hyun	Park Seong-min	Kwon Jun-i	Choi Jae-hyuk	Seol Dong-suk	Daegu
Seoul City Hall	Lee Jae-beom	Lee Ki-jeong	Kim Min-woo	Kim Jeong-min		Seoul
Uijeongbu High School	Park Gun-woo	Koh Do-hyeon	Park Hyo-ik	Ko Hyeon-jun	Park Beom-seok	Uijeongbu
Uiseong High School	Lee Woo-jung	Park Seong-min	Shin Sung-ho	Shin Eun-jun		Uiseong
Uiseong-gun Office	Kim Hyo-jun	Kim Eun-bin	Pyo Jeong-min	Kim Jin-hun		Uiseong

=== Round robin standings ===
Final Round Robin Standings

Key
Teams to Playoffs

Team	Skip	W	L	W–L	PF	PA	EW	EL	BE	SE	DSC
Gyeongbuk Sports Council	Kim Soo-hyuk	7	1	–	59	31	31	24	4	10	38.20
Seoul City Hall	Lee Jae-beom	6	2	–	45	29	33	20	4	14	46.90
Uiseong-gun Office	Kim Hyo-jun	5	3	–	34	38	21	26	11	6	33.40
Uijeongbu High School	Park Gun-woo	4	4	2–0	32	43	23	27	10	2	41.80
Uiseong High School	Lee Woo-jung	4	4	1–1	40	37	26	23	8	10	67.40
Gangwon Province	Park Jong-duk	4	4	0–2	35	39	24	25	9	8	41.20
Kwandong University	Kim Hak-jun	3	5	1–0	29	45	23	27	6	8	60.40
Kyungil University	Kim Dae-hyun	3	5	0–1	36	48	19	28	6	1	44.80
Chungnam	Yoo Jin-han	0	8	–	0	0	0	0	0	0	199.60

=== Round robin results ===
All draws are listed in Korea Standard Time (UTC+09:00).

==== Draw 1 ====
Thursday, June 19, 7:00 pm

Sheet A	1	2	3	4	5	6	7	8	9	10	Final
Gangwon Province (J. Park) 🔨	0	1	0	0	3	2	0	2	0	X	8
Kwandong University (Ha. Kim)	0	0	1	3	0	0	1	0	1	X	6

Sheet B	1	2	3	4	5	6	7	8	9	10	Final
Seoul City Hall (J. Lee)	0	0	0	1	0	1	0	3	0	1	6
Kyungil University (D. Kim) 🔨	0	0	1	0	3	0	2	0	2	0	8

Sheet C	1	2	3	4	5	6	7	8	9	10	Final
Uiseong High School (W. Lee)	0	0	0	1	0	2	0	0	1	0	4
Uijeongbu High School (G. Park) 🔨	0	1	0	0	1	0	0	2	0	1	5

Sheet E	Final
Chungnam (Yoo)	L
Gyeongbuk Sports Council (S. Kim) 🔨	W

==== Draw 3 ====
Friday, June 20, 2:00 pm

Sheet A	1	2	3	4	5	6	7	8	9	10	11	Final
Seoul City Hall (J. Lee) 🔨	1	0	0	1	0	2	2	0	1	0	1	8
Gyeongbuk Sports Council (S. Kim)	0	2	0	0	3	0	0	1	0	1	0	7

Sheet C	Final
Gangwon Province (J. Park) 🔨	W
Chungnam (Yoo)	L

Sheet D	1	2	3	4	5	6	7	8	9	10	Final
Uiseong High School (W. Lee) 🔨	0	1	0	0	0	0	0	1	1	0	3
Kwandong University (Ha. Kim)	0	0	0	1	0	1	1	0	0	1	4

Sheet E	1	2	3	4	5	6	7	8	9	10	Final
Uiseong-gun Office (Hy. Kim)	0	0	1	0	0	0	0	2	3	X	6
Kyungil University (D. Kim) 🔨	0	0	0	1	0	0	0	0	0	X	1

==== Draw 5 ====
Saturday, June 21, 9:00 am

Sheet A	Final
Uiseong High School (W. Lee) 🔨	W
Chungnam (Yoo)	L

Sheet B	1	2	3	4	5	6	7	8	9	10	Final
Seoul City Hall (J. Lee)	0	2	0	0	0	0	2	1	0	1	6
Gangwon Province (J. Park) 🔨	0	0	0	1	1	1	0	0	1	0	4

Sheet C	1	2	3	4	5	6	7	8	9	10	Final
Uiseong-gun Office (Hy. Kim)	0	2	0	0	0	0	2	0	X	X	4
Gyeongbuk Sports Council (S. Kim) 🔨	3	0	0	3	1	1	0	2	X	X	10

Sheet E	1	2	3	4	5	6	7	8	9	10	Final
Uijeongbu High School (G. Park) 🔨	0	0	2	1	0	1	0	4	X	X	8
Kwandong University (Ha. Kim)	0	0	0	0	1	0	1	0	X	X	2

==== Draw 7 ====
Saturday, June 21, 7:00 pm

Sheet A	1	2	3	4	5	6	7	8	9	10	Final
Uiseong-gun Office (Hy. Kim) 🔨	0	0	1	0	0	0	0	0	0	X	1
Gangwon Province (J. Park)	0	0	0	2	0	0	1	1	1	X	5

Sheet B	Final
Uijeongbu High School (G. Park) 🔨	W
Chungnam (Yoo)	L

Sheet D	1	2	3	4	5	6	7	8	9	10	Final
Kyungil University (D. Kim) 🔨	1	0	0	0	2	1	0	2	0	0	6
Gyeongbuk Sports Council (S. Kim)	0	2	2	2	0	0	1	0	0	1	8

Sheet E	1	2	3	4	5	6	7	8	9	10	Final
Uiseong High School (W. Lee)	0	0	1	2	0	0	0	0	1	1	5
Seoul City Hall (J. Lee) 🔨	0	1	0	0	1	1	0	0	0	0	3

==== Draw 9 ====
Sunday, June 22, 2:00 pm

Sheet A	1	2	3	4	5	6	7	8	9	10	Final
Kyungil University (D. Kim)	0	0	0	0	0	4	0	0	3	0	7
Uiseong High School (W. Lee) 🔨	0	0	1	0	4	0	2	1	0	2	10

Sheet C	1	2	3	4	5	6	7	8	9	10	Final
Kwandong University (Ha. Kim)	0	0	0	0	1	0	0	0	0	X	1
Seoul City Hall (J. Lee) 🔨	0	2	0	1	0	2	0	1	2	X	8

Sheet D	1	2	3	4	5	6	7	8	9	10	Final
Uijeongbu High School (G. Park) 🔨	0	1	0	0	1	0	0	0	1	X	3
Uiseong-gun Office (Hy. Kim)	0	0	3	1	0	0	1	1	0	X	6

Sheet E	1	2	3	4	5	6	7	8	9	10	11	Final
Gyeongbuk Sports Council (S. Kim) 🔨	0	1	0	0	2	0	0	0	1	0	2	6
Gangwon Province (J. Park)	0	0	0	1	0	1	1	0	0	1	0	4

==== Draw 11 ====
Monday, June 23, 9:00 am

Sheet A	1	2	3	4	5	6	7	8	9	10	Final
Seoul City Hall (J. Lee)	0	1	0	3	1	1	2	1	X	X	9
Uiseong-gun Office (Hy. Kim) 🔨	2	0	1	0	0	0	0	0	X	X	3

Sheet B	1	2	3	4	5	6	7	8	9	10	Final
Kwandong University (Ha. Kim)	0	0	2	1	1	0	1	0	0	X	5
Gyeongbuk Sports Council (S. Kim) 🔨	1	0	0	0	0	2	0	4	1	X	8

Sheet C	1	2	3	4	5	6	7	8	9	10	11	Final
Uijeongbu High School (G. Park) 🔨	0	2	0	2	0	1	0	2	0	0	1	8
Gangwon Province (J. Park)	1	0	2	0	1	0	2	0	0	1	0	7

Sheet E	Final
Chungnam (Yoo)	L
Kyungil University (D. Kim) 🔨	W

==== Draw 13 ====
Monday, June 23, 7:00 pm

Sheet A	1	2	3	4	5	6	7	8	9	10	Final
Kyungil University (D. Kim) 🔨	0	1	0	0	2	0	0	0	4	0	7
Uijeongbu High School (G. Park)	1	0	0	2	0	0	0	1	0	1	5

Sheet C	1	2	3	4	5	6	7	8	9	10	Final
Gyeongbuk Sports Council (S. Kim) 🔨	2	2	0	2	2	0	0	X	X	X	8
Uiseong High School (W. Lee)	0	0	1	0	0	0	1	X	X	X	2

Sheet D	Final
Seoul City Hall (J. Lee) 🔨	W
Chungnam (Yoo)	L

Sheet E	1	2	3	4	5	6	7	8	9	10	Final
Kwandong University (Ha. Kim)	0	0	1	1	0	0	0	0	1	0	3
Uiseong-gun Office (Hy. Kim) 🔨	0	2	0	0	0	1	0	1	0	2	6

==== Draw 15 ====
Tuesday, June 24, 2:00 pm

Sheet A	Final
Kwandong University (Ha. Kim) 🔨	W
Chungnam (Yoo)	L

Sheet B	1	2	3	4	5	6	7	8	9	10	Final
Uiseong-gun Office (Hy. Kim) 🔨	0	1	3	0	0	2	0	1	0	1	8
Uiseong High School (W. Lee)	0	0	0	2	1	0	2	0	2	0	7

Sheet D	1	2	3	4	5	6	7	8	9	10	Final
Kyungil University (D. Kim)	0	0	0	0	0	2	0	0	1	X	3
Gangwon Province (J. Park) 🔨	0	0	0	1	0	0	0	4	0	X	5

Sheet E	1	2	3	4	5	6	7	8	9	10	Final
Uijeongbu High School (G. Park)	0	0	0	0	1	0	0	0	0	X	1
Seoul City Hall (J. Lee) 🔨	0	1	0	1	0	1	0	1	1	X	5

==== Draw 17 ====
Wednesday, June 25, 10:00 am

Sheet B	1	2	3	4	5	6	7	8	9	10	Final
Kwandong University (Ha. Kim)	0	1	1	1	0	1	0	0	4	X	8
Kyungil University (D. Kim) 🔨	1	0	0	0	1	0	2	0	0	X	4

Sheet C	Final
Uiseong-gun Office (Hy. Kim) 🔨	W
Chungnam (Yoo)	L

Sheet D	1	2	3	4	5	6	7	8	9	10	Final
Gyeongbuk Sports Council (S. Kim)	0	4	2	2	2	0	2	X	X	X	12
Uijeongbu High School (G. Park) 🔨	1	0	0	0	0	1	0	X	X	X	2

Sheet E	1	2	3	4	5	6	7	8	9	10	Final
Gangwon Province (J. Park) 🔨	0	0	0	0	2	0	0	X	X	X	2
Uiseong High School (W. Lee)	0	1	2	1	0	1	4	X	X	X	9

=== Playoffs ===
Page playoff system
1	Gyeongbuk Sports Council	6
2	Seoul City Hall	7
3	Uiseong-gun Office	W
4	Uijeongbu High School	L

Semifinal
1	Gyeongbuk Sports Council	8
3	Uiseong-gun Office	6

Final
2	Seoul City Hall	5
1	Gyeongbuk Sports Council	11

==== 1 vs. 2 ====
Thursday, June 26, 10:00 am

Sheet C	1	2	3	4	5	6	7	8	9	10	Final
Gyeongbuk Sports Council (S. Kim) 🔨	0	3	0	0	1	0	0	0	2	0	6
Seoul City Hall (J. Lee)	0	0	1	2	0	1	0	2	0	1	7

==== 3 vs. 4 ====
Thursday, June 26, 10:00 am

Sheet A	Final
Uiseong-gun Office (Hy. Kim) 🔨	W
Uijeongbu High School (G. Park)	L

==== Semifinal ====
Thursday, June 26, 3:00 pm

Sheet D	1	2	3	4	5	6	7	8	9	10	Final
Gyeongbuk Sports Council (S. Kim) 🔨	2	1	0	1	0	3	0	0	0	1	8
Uiseong-gun Office (Hy. Kim)	0	0	1	0	3	0	2	0	0	0	6

==== Gold medal game ====
Friday, June 27, 10:00 am

Sheet E	1	2	3	4	5	6	7	8	9	10	Final
Seoul City Hall (J. Lee) 🔨	2	0	1	0	1	0	1	0	X	X	5
Gyeongbuk Sports Council (S. Kim)	0	3	0	3	0	2	0	3	X	X	11

2025 Korean Curling Championships
(South Korea)
Kim Soo-hyuk
7th Korean Championship title

=== Final standings ===
Place	Team	Skip
1st place, gold medalist(s)	Gyeongbuk Sports Council	Kim Soo-hyuk
2nd place, silver medalist(s)	Seoul City Hall	Lee Jae-beom
3rd place, bronze medalist(s)	Uiseong-gun Office	Kim Hyo-jun
4	Uijeongbu High School	Park Gun-woo
5	Uiseong High School	Lee Woo-jung
6	Gangwon Province	Park Jong-duk
7	Kwandong University	Kim Hak-jun
8	Kyungil University	Kim Dae-hyun
9	Chungnam	Yoo Jin-han

== Women ==
=== Teams ===
The teams are listed as follows:

Team	Skip	Third	Second	Lead	Alternate	Locale
Chuncheon City Hall	Ha Seung-youn	Kim Hye-rin	Yang Tae-i	Kim Su-jin	Park Seo-jin	Chuncheon
Gangneung City Hall	Kim Eun-jung	Kim Kyeong-ae	Kim Cho-hi	Kim Seon-yeong	Kim Yeong-mi	Gangneung
Gyeonggi Province	Gim Eun-ji	Kim Min-ji	Kim Su-ji	Seol Ye-eun	Seol Ye-ji	Uijeongbu
Jeonbuk Province	Kang Bo-bae	Shim Yu-jeong	Kim Min-seo	Kim Ji-soo	Lee Bo-yeong	Jeonbuk
Kyungil University	Jeong An-ah (Fourth)	Lee Hae-in	Kim Sur-yeong	Oh Ji-hyeon (Skip)		Daegu
Seoul City Hall	Park You-been	Lee Eun-chae	Kim Ji-yoon	Yang Seung-hee		Seoul
Songhyun High School	Kim A-yeon	Hwang Ye-ji	Won Bo-yeon	Hong Soo-ah	Ko Han-ul	Uijeongbu
Uiseong-gun Office	Kim Su-hyeon	Park Han-byul	Bang Yu-jin	Kim Hae-jeong		Uiseong
Yubong Girls' High School	Kim So-yeon	Cho Yeon-ji	Kim Si-hyeon	Kwon Min-seo		Chuncheon

=== Round robin standings ===
Final Round Robin Standings

Key
Teams to Playoffs

Team	Skip	W	L	W–L	PF	PA	EW	EL	BE	SE	DSC
Gyeonggi Province	Gim Eun-ji	7	1	1–0	70	28	35	21	6	11	33.80
Chuncheon City Hall	Ha Seung-youn	7	1	0–1	62	32	33	26	11	11	24.70
Jeonbuk Province	Kang Bo-bae	6	2	–	68	35	37	26	1	12	33.50
Gangneung City Hall	Kim Eun-jung	5	3	–	45	43	28	28	7	7	29.20
Seoul City Hall	Park You-been	4	4	–	48	48	30	29	2	11	57.30
Uiseong-gun Office	Kim Su-hyeon	2	6	2–0	37	61	26	36	8	4	52.70
Kyungil University	Oh Ji-hyeon	2	6	1–1	28	56	20	33	7	4	108.40
Yubong Girls' High School	Kim So-yeon	2	6	0–2	40	58	33	32	3	7	59.80
Songhyun High School	Kim A-yeon	1	7	–	30	67	26	37	4	4	45.10

=== Round robin results ===
All draws are listed in Korea Standard Time (UTC+09:00).

==== Draw 2 ====
Friday, June 20, 9:00 am

Sheet A	1	2	3	4	5	6	7	8	9	10	Final
Chuncheon City Hall (Ha) 🔨	0	0	3	0	0	0	1	0	2	0	6
Uiseong-gun Office (Su. Kim)	0	0	0	0	1	0	0	1	0	1	3

Sheet B	1	2	3	4	5	6	7	8	9	10	Final
Kyungil University (Oh)	0	1	0	1	0	0	0	2	0	X	4
Jeonbuk Province (Kang) 🔨	0	0	2	0	3	0	1	0	5	X	11

Sheet D	1	2	3	4	5	6	7	8	9	10	Final
Yubong Girls' High School (So. Kim) 🔨	1	0	1	0	1	0	2	0	0	X	5
Gangneung City Hall (E. Kim)	0	3	0	2	0	2	0	0	1	X	8

Sheet E	1	2	3	4	5	6	7	8	9	10	Final
Songhyun High School (A. Kim)	0	1	0	0	0	0	1	0	X	X	2
Gyeonggi Province (Gim) 🔨	2	0	1	0	2	1	0	3	X	X	9

==== Draw 4 ====
Friday, June 20, 7:00 pm

Sheet B	1	2	3	4	5	6	7	8	9	10	Final
Yubong Girls' High School (So. Kim) 🔨	1	0	2	0	0	0	1	0	0	1	5
Songhyun High School (A. Kim)	0	1	0	0	1	0	0	1	1	0	4

Sheet C	1	2	3	4	5	6	7	8	9	10	Final
Kyungil University (Oh)	0	0	0	0	1	0	1	0	0	X	2
Gangneung City Hall (E. Kim) 🔨	0	0	1	0	0	3	0	2	1	X	7

Sheet D	1	2	3	4	5	6	7	8	9	10	Final
Chuncheon City Hall (Ha) 🔨	0	2	0	1	0	0	1	2	0	0	6
Gyeonggi Province (Gim)	0	0	1	0	1	1	0	0	1	3	7

Sheet E	1	2	3	4	5	6	7	8	9	10	Final
Seoul City Hall (Park) 🔨	2	0	0	0	2	1	0	1	0	X	6
Uiseong-gun Office (Su. Kim)	0	0	1	0	0	0	1	0	1	X	3

==== Draw 6 ====
Saturday, June 21, 2:00 pm

Sheet A	1	2	3	4	5	6	7	8	9	10	Final
Chuncheon City Hall (Ha) 🔨	0	2	2	0	5	0	X	X	X	X	9
Yubong Girls' High School (So. Kim)	1	0	0	1	0	1	X	X	X	X	3

Sheet B	1	2	3	4	5	6	7	8	9	10	Final
Seoul City Hall (Park)	0	1	0	2	0	0	1	X	X	X	4
Gyeonggi Province (Gim) 🔨	2	0	3	0	2	4	0	X	X	X	11

Sheet D	1	2	3	4	5	6	7	8	9	10	Final
Kyungil University (Oh)	1	0	1	0	2	4	0	2	X	X	10
Songhyun High School (A. Kim) 🔨	0	2	0	1	0	0	1	0	X	X	4

Sheet E	1	2	3	4	5	6	7	8	9	10	Final
Jeonbuk Province (Kang) 🔨	2	1	0	3	0	1	2	X	X	X	9
Gangneung City Hall (E. Kim)	0	0	1	0	1	0	0	X	X	X	2

==== Draw 8 ====
Sunday, June 22, 9:00 am

Sheet A	1	2	3	4	5	6	7	8	9	10	Final
Jeonbuk Province (Kang)	0	1	4	0	0	4	1	X	X	X	10
Songhyun High School (A. Kim) 🔨	1	0	0	1	1	0	0	X	X	X	3

Sheet C	1	2	3	4	5	6	7	8	9	10	Final
Uiseong-gun Office (Su. Kim)	0	0	1	0	0	1	0	0	0	X	2
Gyeonggi Province (Gim) 🔨	0	2	0	0	3	0	3	1	2	X	11

Sheet D	1	2	3	4	5	6	7	8	9	10	Final
Seoul City Hall (Park)	0	0	3	0	2	0	2	0	0	0	7
Yubong Girls' High School (So. Kim) 🔨	1	1	0	1	0	2	0	1	1	1	8

Sheet E	1	2	3	4	5	6	7	8	9	10	Final
Kyungil University (Oh)	0	0	0	1	0	0	0	0	X	X	1
Chuncheon City Hall (Ha) 🔨	0	1	1	0	1	1	2	1	X	X	7

==== Draw 10 ====
Sunday, June 22, 7:00 pm

Sheet B	1	2	3	4	5	6	7	8	9	10	Final
Gangneung City Hall (E. Kim)	0	0	0	2	1	0	0	1	0	X	4
Chuncheon City Hall (Ha) 🔨	0	0	3	0	0	2	1	0	4	X	10

Sheet C	1	2	3	4	5	6	7	8	9	10	Final
Jeonbuk Province (Kang) 🔨	2	0	3	1	4	1	X	X	X	X	11
Seoul City Hall (Park)	0	1	0	0	0	0	X	X	X	X	1

Sheet D	1	2	3	4	5	6	7	8	9	10	Final
Uiseong-gun Office (Su. Kim) 🔨	1	0	0	0	0	2	0	0	0	2	5
Kyungil University (Oh)	0	0	0	1	1	0	1	0	0	0	3

Sheet E	1	2	3	4	5	6	7	8	9	10	Final
Gyeonggi Province (Gim) 🔨	0	2	0	0	4	0	2	2	X	X	10
Yubong Girls' High School (So. Kim)	0	0	0	1	0	2	0	0	X	X	3

==== Draw 12 ====
Monday, June 23, 2:00 pm

Sheet A	1	2	3	4	5	6	7	8	9	10	Final
Gyeonggi Province (Gim)	0	0	0	0	1	1	0	1	0	0	3
Gangneung City Hall (E. Kim) 🔨	0	1	0	0	0	0	2	0	0	1	4

Sheet B	1	2	3	4	5	6	7	8	9	10	Final
Yubong Girls' High School (So. Kim) 🔨	1	0	1	0	1	0	0	1	0	X	4
Jeonbuk Province (Kang)	0	1	0	1	0	1	1	0	2	X	6

Sheet D	1	2	3	4	5	6	7	8	9	10	Final
Chuncheon City Hall (Ha) 🔨	0	2	0	0	3	0	2	0	0	1	8
Seoul City Hall (Park)	0	0	2	1	0	2	0	2	0	0	7

Sheet E	1	2	3	4	5	6	7	8	9	10	11	Final
Songhyun High School (A. Kim) 🔨	2	1	0	0	2	0	2	1	0	0	1	9
Uiseong-gun Office (Su. Kim)	0	0	1	1	0	3	0	0	0	3	0	8

==== Draw 14 ====
Tuesday, June 24, 9:00 am

Sheet B	1	2	3	4	5	6	7	8	9	10	Final
Gyeonggi Province (Gim) 🔨	3	0	0	3	2	2	X	X	X	X	10
Kyungil University (Oh)	0	0	1	0	0	0	X	X	X	X	1

Sheet C	1	2	3	4	5	6	7	8	9	10	Final
Songhyun High School (A. Kim) 🔨	0	0	0	1	0	1	0	0	0	X	2
Chuncheon City Hall (Ha)	0	1	1	0	2	0	0	3	2	X	9

Sheet D	1	2	3	4	5	6	7	8	9	10	Final
Uiseong-gun Office (Su. Kim)	0	1	0	0	2	1	0	0	1	0	5
Jeonbuk Province (Kang) 🔨	2	0	1	0	0	0	2	3	0	2	10

Sheet E	1	2	3	4	5	6	7	8	9	10	Final
Gangneung City Hall (E. Kim) 🔨	0	0	0	2	0	0	1	0	0	X	3
Seoul City Hall (Park)	2	1	0	0	0	1	0	2	2	X	8

==== Draw 16 ====
Tuesday, June 24, 7:00 pm

Sheet A	1	2	3	4	5	6	7	8	9	10	Final
Seoul City Hall (Park) 🔨	1	1	1	2	0	2	0	X	X	X	7
Kyungil University (Oh)	0	0	0	0	0	0	1	X	X	X	1

Sheet C	1	2	3	4	5	6	7	8	9	10	Final
Uiseong-gun Office (Su. Kim) 🔨	1	1	2	0	0	0	0	1	0	3	8
Yubong Girls' High School (So. Kim)	0	0	0	2	1	1	1	0	2	0	7

Sheet D	1	2	3	4	5	6	7	8	9	10	Final
Gangneung City Hall (E. Kim)	0	2	1	0	0	3	0	1	1	X	8
Songhyun High School (A. Kim) 🔨	1	0	0	1	0	0	1	0	0	X	3

Sheet E	1	2	3	4	5	6	7	8	9	10	Final
Jeonbuk Province (Kang)	0	0	1	0	0	1	0	1	1	1	5
Chuncheon City Hall (Ha) 🔨	0	2	0	2	1	0	2	0	0	0	7

==== Draw 18 ====
Wednesday, June 25, 3:00 pm

Sheet A	1	2	3	4	5	6	7	8	9	10	Final
Gangneung City Hall (E. Kim)	0	1	0	0	0	2	1	2	3	X	9
Uiseong-gun Office (Su. Kim) 🔨	1	0	0	0	2	0	0	0	0	X	3

Sheet B	1	2	3	4	5	6	7	8	9	10	Final
Songhyun High School (A. Kim)	0	0	1	0	1	0	0	0	1	X	3
Seoul City Hall (Park) 🔨	1	0	0	2	0	1	1	3	0	X	8

Sheet C	1	2	3	4	5	6	7	8	9	10	Final
Gyeonggi Province (Gim) 🔨	2	0	0	2	0	2	0	2	0	1	9
Jeonbuk Province (Kang)	0	1	0	0	2	0	2	0	1	0	6

Sheet E	1	2	3	4	5	6	7	8	9	10	Final
Yubong Girls' High School (So. Kim) 🔨	0	1	0	1	0	1	0	2	0	0	5
Kyungil University (Oh)	0	0	1	0	1	0	2	0	0	2	6

=== Playoffs ===
Page playoff system
1	Gyeonggi Province	3
2	Chuncheon City Hall	9
3	Jeonbuk Province	6
4	Gangneung City Hall	4

Semifinal
1	Gyeonggi Province	9
3	Jeonbuk Province	5

Final
2	Chuncheon City Hall	4
1	Gyeonggi Province	7

==== 1 vs. 2 ====
Thursday, June 26, 10:00 am

Sheet B	1	2	3	4	5	6	7	8	9	10	Final
Gyeonggi Province (Gim) 🔨	1	0	2	0	0	0	0	0	0	X	3
Chuncheon City Hall (Ha)	0	1	0	0	2	1	1	3	1	X	9

==== 3 vs. 4 ====
Thursday, June 26, 10:00 am

Sheet D	1	2	3	4	5	6	7	8	9	10	11	Final
Jeonbuk Province (Kang) 🔨	0	0	0	2	0	0	1	0	1	0	2	6
Gangneung City Hall (E. Kim)	0	0	1	0	1	0	0	1	0	1	0	4

==== Semifinal ====
Thursday, June 26, 3:00 pm

Sheet C	1	2	3	4	5	6	7	8	9	10	Final
Gyeonggi Province (Gim) 🔨	0	0	0	2	0	2	0	1	0	4	9
Jeonbuk Province (Kang)	0	1	1	0	1	0	0	0	2	0	5

==== Gold medal game ====
Friday, June 27, 3:00 pm

Sheet E	1	2	3	4	5	6	7	8	9	10	Final
Chuncheon City Hall (Ha) 🔨	1	0	0	0	0	1	0	0	2	0	4
Gyeonggi Province (Gim)	0	1	1	1	0	0	0	2	0	2	7

2025 Korean Curling Championships
(South Korea)
Gim Eun-ji
7th Korean Championship title

=== Final standings ===
Place	Team	Skip
1st place, gold medalist(s)	Gyeonggi Province	Gim Eun-ji
2nd place, silver medalist(s)	Chuncheon City Hall	Ha Seung-youn
3rd place, bronze medalist(s)	Jeonbuk Province	Kang Bo-bae
4	Gangneung City Hall	Kim Eun-jung
5	Seoul City Hall	Park You-been
6	Uiseong-gun Office	Kim Su-hyeon
7	Kyungil University	Oh Ji-hyeon
8	Yubong Girls' High School	Kim So-yeon
9	Songhyun High School	Kim A-yeon

== See also ==
- 2025 Korean Mixed Doubles Curling Championship
