= Kim Hye-rin (curler) =

South Korean curler (born 1999)

- Curler
- Born: November 9, 1999 (age 27); Gyeonggido, South Korea

Team
- Curling club: Gangneung CC, Gangneung, KOR
- Skip: Ha Seung-youn
- Third: Kim Hye-rin
- Second: Kim Cho-hi
- Lead: Kim Seon-yeong
- Mixed doubles partner: Yoo Min-hyeon

Curling career
- Member Association: South Korea
- World Championship: 2 (2019, 2023)
- Pacific-Asia Championship: 1 (2018)
- Pan Continental Championship: 1 (2022)
- Other appearances: World Junior Curling Championships: 5 (2016, 2017, 2018, 2019, 2020)
Medal record
Women's curling
Representing South Korea
World Championships
Bronze medal – third place	2019 Silkeborg
Pan Continental Championships
Silver medal – second place	2022 Calgary
Pacific-Asia Championships
Gold medal – first place	2018 Gangneung
World Junior Championships
Silver medal – second place	2020 Krasnoyarsk
Bronze medal – third place	2016 Copenhagen
Winter Universiade
Silver medal – second place	2019 Krasnoyarsk
Silver medal – second place	2023 Saranac Lake
Representing Gyeonggi
Korean Women's Championship
Silver medal – second place	2016 Uiseong
Silver medal – second place	2017 Icheon
Representing Chuncheon
Korean Women's Championship
Gold medal – first place	2018 Jincheon
Gold medal – first place	2022 Jincheon
Silver medal – second place	2019 Gangneung
Silver medal – second place	2021 Gangneung
Silver medal – second place	2024 Uijeongbu
Silver medal – second place	2025 Uijeongbu
Bronze medal – third place	2020 Gangneung
Bronze medal – third place	2023 Gangneung
Representing Gangwon
Korean Mixed Doubles Championship
Silver medal – second place	2023 Uijeongbu
Silver medal – second place	2025 Jincheon
Bronze medal – third place	2024 Jincheon
Representing Gangneung
Bronze medal – third place	2026 Uiseong

Kim Hye-rin (born November 9, 1999) is a South Korean curler from Uijeongbu. She currently plays third on the Gangneung City Hall curling team, skipped by Ha Seung-youn. While playing for Kim Min-ji, She won a gold medal at the 2018 Pacific-Asia Curling Championships and a silver medal at the 2020 World Junior Curling Championships.

== Career ==
Kim played third for the South Korean junior team at the 2016 World Junior Curling Championships, skipped by Kim Min-ji, where she would win the bronze medal. After finishing the round robin with a 7–2 record, the team lost to Hungary (skipped by Dorottya Palancsa) in the 3 vs. 4 page playoff game, but went on to beat the Hungarians in a re-match in the bronze medal game, after Hungary lost in the semifinal.

The next season, the team began playing on the World Curling Tour. They won her first tour event by claiming the 2016 Hub International Crown of Curling.

The team represented Korea at the 2017 World Junior Curling Championships, where they posted a 5–4 round robin record, tied with Switzerland for fourth. They would beat the Swiss in a tiebreaker, before losing two straight games against Canada to finish in fourth place.This team represented Korea at the 2018 World Junior Curling Championships, where they finished with a 4–5 record, missing the playoffs.

The team began the 2018–19 season by winning the Hokkaido Bank Curling Classic. They then went on to win gold at the 2018 Pacific-Asia Curling Championships, earning South Korea a berth at the 2019 World Women's Curling Championship.

She and her team participated in all four legs of the 2018–19 Curling World Cup. In the First Leg, they finished with a 1–5 record, placing seventh out of eight teams. At the Second Leg, they made it all the way to the final falling just short to Japan's Satsuki Fujisawa 7–6. The team on this performance by winning the Third Leg against Sweden's Anna Hasselborg rink. In the Grand Final, the team finished with a 2–4 record.

Her team, still junior eligible represented Korea at the 2019 World Junior Curling Championships. They finished the round robin with a 6–3 record, which was tied with three other teams for the second best record. However, they missed the playoffs due to tiebreaker rules. The following month, the team represented Korea at the 2019 Winter Universiade. This time their 6–3 record was enough to make the playoffs, where they made it all the way to the final before losing to Sweden. Later that month, the team had yet another international event to play in, the 2019 World Championship. The team was even better on this stage, finishing the round robin with a 9–3 record, in second place. In the playoffs, they lost to Switzerland's Silvana Tirinzoni rink in the semifinal, but rebounded to win the bronze medal game against Seina Nakajima of Japan. It was the first ever medal won by Korea at the Women's World Championship. The team ended their season with a 1–3 record at the 2019 Champions Cup Grand Slam of Curling event.

Team Kim lost the final of the 2019 Korean Curling Championships the following season in July 2019 to the Gim Un-chi rink. This meant they would not be the national women's team for the season. The team won the Tour Challenge Tier 2 event after a strong 9–2 win over Jestyn Murphy. This qualified them for the Canadian Open in Yorkton, Saskatchewan. There, they defeated higher ranked teams such as three time Scotties champion Rachel Homan, 2013 world champion Eve Muirhead and 2020 Scotties champion Kerri Einarson. They made it all the way to the final before losing to the Anna Hasselborg rink in an extra end. They also made it all the way to the final of the 2020 World Junior Curling Championships, where they lost to Canada's Mackenzie Zacharias. On the World Curling Tour, they won the Boundary Ford Curling Classic, finished fourth at the inaugural WCT Uiseong International Curling Cup, made the quarterfinals at the Red Deer Curling Classic and missed the playoffs at the 2019 Curlers Corner Autumn Gold Curling Classic and the 2019 Canad Inns Women's Classic.

The Kim rink began the abbreviated 2020–21 season at the 2020 Korean Curling Championships. There, they qualified for the playoffs with a 5–1 record before losing both of their playoff games to the Kim Eun-jung and Gim Un-chi rinks, settling for third. Later that season, they competed in the only two Grand Slam events of the season, which were played in a "curling bubble" in Calgary, Alberta, with no spectators, to avoid the spread of the coronavirus. The team missed the playoffs at both the 2021 Champions Cup and the 2021 Players' Championship.

The 2021–22 season began in June for Team Kim as they competed in the 2021 Korean Curling Championships to decide who would get the chance to represent Korea at the 2022 Winter Olympics in Beijing, China. In the first of three rounds, the team went a perfect 4–0 in the round robin before losing in the semifinal to the Gim Un-chi rink. They rebounded with a win over Kim Ji-su in the third place game. In the second round, they went 4–2, however, because Team Kim Eun-jung won both the first and second rounds, they became the national champions. Kim Hye-rin later competed in 2021 Korean Mixed Doubles Curling Championship with partner Seong Yu-jin. The pair reached the second round of the event, however, finished in seventh place. Through the fall of 2021, skip Kim Min-ji was absent from the team due to winning the Mixed Doubles championship with Lee Ki-jeong. This moved Kim Hye-rin up to skip of the team. They played in two Grand Slam events, the 2021 Masters and the 2021 National, finishing with a 1–3 record at both. They only played in one more event during the season, the Boundary Ford Curling Classic, where they lost in the final to Team Gim. In March 2022, Kim Min-ji would move to Gyeonggi Province to join Team Gim, with Ha Seung-youn taking over as skip for the Chuncheon City Hall team.

The newly revised Chuncheon City Hall rink were the dark horses entering the 2022 Korean Curling Championships behind both Gangneung City Hall's Kim Eun-jung and Gyeonggi Province's Gim Eun-ji. Despite this, they finished second in the round robin with a 5–1 record and then beat Gangneung City Hall 7–5 in the semifinal. In the championship game, they won 7–4 over Gyeonggi Province to become the national team for the 2022–23 season. On tour, the team did not find early success, with their best results being a fourth place finish at the 2022 Hokkaido Bank Curling Classic and a quarterfinal appearance at the 2022 Alberta Curling Series Major. They then turned things around, however, winning the US Open of Curling and finishing second at the S3 Group Curling Stadium Series. At the 2022 Pan Continental Curling Championships, the team led Korea to a 6–2 record, enough to qualify for the playoffs as the fourth seed. They then beat the higher seeded United States in the semifinal to qualify for the final where they faced Japan's Satsuki Fujisawa. There, they fell 8–6 to the Japanese in an extra end, settling for silver. In the new year, the team represented Korea at the 2023 Winter World University Games where they topped the round robin with an 8–1 record. After beating Great Britain in the semifinal, they lost to China in the championship game, once again taking silver. Despite their success at both the Pan Continental Championship and the World University Games, the team could not continue their medal streak at the 2023 World Women's Curling Championship, finishing ninth with a 5–7 record.

At the 2023 Korean Curling Championships, Team Ha could not defend their national title. After starting with six straight wins, the team lost three of their next four games, finishing in third place behind Gyeonggi Province and Gangneung City Hall. Despite losing their spot as the national team, they had a strong start to their tour season, capturing the 2023 Stu Sells Oakville Tankard. They also made the playoffs at the 2023 KW Fall Classic where they went undefeated until the semifinals before losing to Krista McCarville. After their first two events, the team struggled to find success, only qualifying in three of their next eight events. This included a semifinal finish at the Stu Sells 1824 Halifax Classic and two quarterfinal losses at the Prestige Hotels & Resorts Curling Classic and the North Grenville Women's Fall Curling Classic, both after previously undefeated records. In November 2023, they again finished third at the Uiseong Korean Cup, not being able to make it past the Gim or Kim rinks. They ended their season at the 2024 New Year Curling in Miyota event where they missed the playoffs.

After playing a shorter 2023–24 season, Chuncheon City Hall emerged as a top ten team during the 2024–25 season. This began at the 2024 Korean Curling Championships where the team were the frontrunners for the majority of the week, finishing first through the round robin and defeating Gangneung City Hall in the 1 vs. 2 game. Facing Gyeonggi Province in the final, they lost 6–5 in an extra end, settling for silver and missing out on the national team. Despite this, they turned things around quickly, winning the first tour title of the season at the Curling1spoon Elite 8. At the first Grand Slam of the season, the team reached the semifinals of the 2024 Tour Challenge Tier 2, falling to eventual champion Christina Black. They also had a strong run at the Saville Grand Prix, making it to the final where they were defeated by Kerri Einarson. Team Ha was successful in qualifying at the next two slams as well, reaching the semifinals at the 2024 Canadian Open and the quarterfinals at the 2024 National. After missing the playoffs at the 2025 Masters, they ended their season on a high note with a semifinal finish at the Gangneung Invitational and a quarterfinal finish at the 2025 Players' Championship.

== Personal life ==
Kim attended Korea National Open University.
