= 2026 Karuizawa International Curling Championships =

- Host city: Karuizawa, Japan
- Arena: Karuizawa Ice Park
- Dates: September 17–20
- Men's winner: (Japan) Team Yamaguchi
- Curling club: Karuizawa CC, Karuizawa, Nagano
- Skip: Tsuyoshi Yamaguchi
- Fourth: Riku Yanagisawa
- Second: Takeru Yamamoto
- Lead: Satoshi Koizumi
- Finalist: (Japan) Takumi Maeda
- Women's winner: (Sweden) Team Wranå
- Curling club: Sundbybergs CK, Sundbyberg
- Skip: Isabella Wranå
- Third: Almida de Val
- Second: Moa Dryburgh
- Lead: Maria Larsson
- Finalist: (South Korea) Team Kang

The 2026 Karuizawa International Curling Championships were held from September 17 to 20 at the Karuizawa Ice Park in Karuizawa, Nagano, Japan. The total purse for the event was ¥ 1,500,000 on both the men's and women's sides.

For the 2026–27 season, the event was a satellite Grand Slam of Curling event. The highest ranking non-qualified team on the men's and women's sides earned a spot at the 2026 GSOC Invitational, the first Grand Slam of the season. With the winning teams both already being qualified, these berths went to the finalists Japan's Takumi Maeda and South Korea's Kim Kyeong-ae.

== Men ==
=== Teams ===
The teams are listed as follows:

Skip	Third	Second	Lead	Alternate	Locale
Tetsuro Shimizu (Fourth)	Shinya Abe (Skip)	Haruto Ouchi	Hayato Sato	Asei Nakahara	Sapporo, Japan
Oskar Eriksson	Rasmus Wranå	Simon Olofsson	Christoffer Sundgren		Karlstad, Sweden
Kaito Fujii	Miki Yamamoto	Konosuke Takahashi	Shunsuke Kanagawa	Ruki Yokoyama	Karuizawa, Japan
Go Aoki (Fourth)	Shingo Usui	Takeshi Aoyanagi	Kohsuke Hirata (Skip)	Ryota Meguro	Kitami, Japan
Jeong Byeong-jin	Kim Hyo-jun	Pyo Jeong-min	Kim Jin-hun	Kim Dae-hyun	Uiseong, South Korea
Shunta Kobayashi	Hinata Michitani	Shuto Ouchi	Chikara Segawa		Sapporo, Japan
Lee Jae-beom	Kim Min-woo	Kim San	Kim Jeong-min		Seoul, South Korea
Takumi Maeda	Uryu Kamikawa	Ryotaro Shukuya (Note: Alternate Ryotaro Shukuya played second throughout the tournament with second Uryu Kamikawa moving to third and third Hiroki Maeda sitting out.)	Gakuto Tokoro	Hiroki Maeda	Tokoro, Japan
Kotaro Noguchi	Yuto Kamada	– (Note: Team Noguchi played with three players.)	Hiromasa Yonehara		Miyagi, Japan
P. N. Raju	– (Note: Team Raju played with three players.)	Sudheer Reddy	Kishan Vasant		Hyderabad, India
Riku Yanagisawa (Fourth)	Tsuyoshi Yamaguchi (Skip)	Takeru Yamamoto	Satoshi Koizumi		Karuizawa, Japan
Ryo Wakabayashi (Note: Ryo Wakabayashi skipped Team Yoshioka.)	Kosuke Yuuki	Masahito Hirano	Shinji Okamoto		Kyoto, Japan

=== Round robin standings ===
Final Round Robin Standings

Key
Teams to Playoffs

Pool A	W	L	W–L	PF	PA
(Sweden) Oskar Eriksson	5	0	–	37	9
(Japan) Kohsuke Hirata	4	1	–	30	23
(Japan) Shunta Kobayashi	3	2	–	22	26
(Japan) Shinya Abe	2	3	–	27	18
(Japan) Kotaro Noguchi	1	4	–	19	28
(India) P. N. Raju	0	5	–	14	45

Pool B	W	L	W–L	PF	PA
(Japan) Tsuyoshi Yamaguchi	4	1	1–0	35	21
(Japan) Takumi Maeda	4	1	0–1	29	17
(Japan) Kaito Fujii	3	2	–	30	28
(South Korea) Jeong Byeong-jin	2	3	1–0	26	29
(South Korea) Lee Jae-beom	2	3	0–1	25	25
(Japan) Team Yoshioka	0	5	–	16	41

=== Round robin results ===
All draw times are listed in Japan Standard Time (UTC+09:00).

==== Draw 1 ====
Thursday, September 17, 9:00 am

Sheet A	1	2	3	4	5	6	7	8	Final
(Japan) Shunta Kobayashi	0	0	4	0	0	0	3	X	7
(India) P. N. Raju 🔨	0	0	0	3	0	2	0	X	5

Sheet C	1	2	3	4	5	6	7	8	Final
(Japan) Kotaro Noguchi	0	1	0	2	0	0	3	0	6
(Japan) Kohsuke Hirata 🔨	1	0	3	0	1	2	0	1	8

Sheet E	1	2	3	4	5	6	7	8	Final
(South Korea) Jeong Byeong-jin	1	1	3	0	5	0	X	X	10
(Japan) Team Yoshioka 🔨	0	0	0	2	0	2	X	X	4

==== Draw 2 ====
Thursday, September 17, 12:30 pm

Sheet B	1	2	3	4	5	6	7	8	Final
(Japan) Shinya Abe 🔨	0	0	1	0	0	1	0	X	2
(Sweden) Oskar Eriksson	1	0	0	2	0	0	1	X	4

Sheet D	1	2	3	4	5	6	7	8	Final
(Japan) Takumi Maeda	0	0	1	0	0	2	1	X	4
(South Korea) Lee Jae-beom 🔨	0	1	0	0	1	0	0	X	2

Sheet F	1	2	3	4	5	6	7	8	Final
(Japan) Tsuyoshi Yamaguchi	0	3	0	0	1	0	2	2	8
(Japan) Kaito Fujii 🔨	1	0	1	0	0	1	0	0	3

==== Draw 3 ====
Thursday, September 17, 4:00 pm

Sheet A	1	2	3	4	5	6	7	8	9	Final
(South Korea) Lee Jae-beom 🔨	0	1	0	1	2	0	0	1	0	5
(South Korea) Jeong Byeong-jin	0	0	2	0	0	2	1	0	1	6

Sheet C	1	2	3	4	5	6	7	8	Final
(India) P. N. Raju	0	1	0	0	0	1	X	X	2
(Japan) Shinya Abe 🔨	5	0	4	1	2	0	X	X	12

Sheet E	1	2	3	4	5	6	7	8	Final
(Japan) Kohsuke Hirata	0	0	1	0	0	2	0	X	3
(Sweden) Oskar Eriksson 🔨	3	1	0	1	1	0	3	X	9

==== Draw 4 ====
Thursday, September 17, 7:30 pm

Sheet B	1	2	3	4	5	6	7	8	Final
(Japan) Tsuyoshi Yamaguchi	0	2	1	0	2	0	1	X	6
(Japan) Takumi Maeda 🔨	1	0	0	1	0	2	0	X	4

Sheet D	1	2	3	4	5	6	7	8	Final
(Japan) Kaito Fujii 🔨	0	3	0	0	2	0	0	4	9
(Japan) Team Yoshioka	1	0	0	1	0	1	1	0	4

Sheet F	1	2	3	4	5	6	7	8	Final
(Japan) Shunta Kobayashi	0	1	0	0	4	1	0	X	6
(Japan) Kotaro Noguchi 🔨	0	0	0	2	0	0	1	X	3

==== Draw 5 ====
Friday, September 18, 9:00 am

Sheet A	1	2	3	4	5	6	7	8	9	Final
(Japan) Kohsuke Hirata	0	1	0	0	1	0	2	0	1	5
(Japan) Shinya Abe 🔨	0	0	1	0	0	1	0	2	0	4

Sheet C	1	2	3	4	5	6	7	8	9	Final
(Japan) Kaito Fujii 🔨	2	0	2	0	2	0	0	0	1	7
(South Korea) Jeong Byeong-jin	0	1	0	1	0	2	1	1	0	6

Sheet E	1	2	3	4	5	6	7	8	Final
(Japan) Kotaro Noguchi 🔨	1	0	3	2	1	0	2	X	9
(India) P. N. Raju	0	1	0	0	0	1	0	X	2

==== Draw 6 ====
Friday, September 18, 12:30 pm

Sheet B	1	2	3	4	5	6	7	8	Final
(Japan) Shunta Kobayashi 🔨	0	2	0	0	0	0	0	X	2
(Japan) Kohsuke Hirata	1	0	2	0	1	0	1	X	5

Sheet D	1	2	3	4	5	6	7	8	Final
(South Korea) Lee Jae-beom	0	2	0	4	0	1	0	2	9
(Japan) Tsuyoshi Yamaguchi 🔨	1	0	2	0	1	0	2	0	6

Sheet F	1	2	3	4	5	6	7	8	Final
(India) P. N. Raju	0	1	0	0	2	0	0	X	3
(Sweden) Oskar Eriksson 🔨	2	0	1	1	0	3	1	X	8

==== Draw 7 ====
Friday, September 18, 4:00 pm

Sheet A	1	2	3	4	5	6	7	8	Final
(Japan) Team Yoshioka	0	0	1	1	0	0	1	X	3
(Japan) Tsuyoshi Yamaguchi 🔨	1	2	0	0	3	1	0	X	7

Sheet C	1	2	3	4	5	6	7	8	Final
(Japan) Shinya Abe 🔨	0	0	0	1	2	1	1	X	5
(Japan) Kotaro Noguchi	0	0	1	0	0	0	0	X	1

Sheet E	1	2	3	4	5	6	7	8	Final
(Japan) Takumi Maeda 🔨	2	0	1	0	0	1	0	3	7
(Japan) Kaito Fujii	0	2	0	1	1	0	2	0	6

==== Draw 8 ====
Friday, September 18, 7:30 pm

Sheet B	1	2	3	4	5	6	7	8	Final
(Japan) Team Yoshioka	0	0	1	0	2	0	1	X	4
(South Korea) Lee Jae-beom 🔨	0	3	0	2	0	1	0	X	6

Sheet D	1	2	3	4	5	6	7	8	Final
(Sweden) Oskar Eriksson 🔨	3	3	0	3	X	X	X	X	9
(Japan) Shunta Kobayashi	0	0	1	0	X	X	X	X	1

Sheet F	1	2	3	4	5	6	7	8	Final
(Japan) Takumi Maeda 🔨	1	0	2	0	2	0	X	X	5
(South Korea) Jeong Byeong-jin	0	1	0	0	0	1	X	X	2

==== Draw 9 ====
Saturday, September 19, 9:00 am

Sheet A	1	2	3	4	5	6	7	8	Final
(India) P. N. Raju 🔨	0	0	1	0	1	0	X	X	2
(Japan) Kohsuke Hirata	2	3	0	3	0	1	X	X	9

Sheet C	1	2	3	4	5	6	7	8	Final
(South Korea) Jeong Byeong-jin	1	0	1	0	0	0	X	X	2
(Japan) Tsuyoshi Yamaguchi 🔨	0	2	0	0	5	1	X	X	8

Sheet E	1	2	3	4	5	6	7	8	Final
(Japan) Shinya Abe	0	0	1	0	0	3	0	0	4
(Japan) Shunta Kobayashi 🔨	1	1	0	1	2	0	0	1	6

==== Draw 10 ====
Saturday, September 19, 12:30 pm

Sheet B	1	2	3	4	5	6	7	8	Final
(Sweden) Oskar Eriksson 🔨	2	1	1	1	2	X	X	X	7
(Japan) Kotaro Noguchi	0	0	0	0	0	X	X	X	0

Sheet D	1	2	3	4	5	6	7	8	Final
(Japan) Team Yoshioka	0	0	0	1	0	0	X	X	1
(Japan) Takumi Maeda 🔨	2	0	1	0	1	5	X	X	9

Sheet F	1	2	3	4	5	6	7	8	Final
(Japan) Kaito Fujii 🔨	0	1	0	0	1	0	3	X	5
(South Korea) Lee Jae-beom	0	0	1	1	0	1	0	X	3

=== Playoffs ===
Quarterfinals
B2	(Japan) Takumi Maeda	10
A3	(Japan) Shunta Kobayashi	3
A2	(Japan) Kohsuke Hirata	2
B3	(Japan) Kaito Fujii	3

Semifinals
A1	(Sweden) Oskar Eriksson	3
B2	(Japan) Takumi Maeda	6
B1	(Japan) Tsuyoshi Yamaguchi	5
B3	(Japan) Kaito Fujii	4

Final
B2	(Japan) Takumi Maeda	3
B1	(Japan) Tsuyoshi Yamaguchi	4
Third place game
A1	(Sweden) Oskar Eriksson	5
B3	(Japan) Kaito Fujii	2

==== Quarterfinals ====
Saturday, September 19, 4:00 pm

Sheet C	1	2	3	4	5	6	7	8	Final
(Japan) Takumi Maeda 🔨	0	3	0	3	0	0	4	X	10
(Japan) Shunta Kobayashi	1	0	0	0	1	1	0	X	3

Sheet E	1	2	3	4	5	6	7	8	Final
(Japan) Kohsuke Hirata 🔨	0	0	1	0	0	1	0	0	2
(Japan) Kaito Fujii	0	0	0	2	0	0	0	1	3

==== Semifinals ====
Saturday, September 19, 7:30 pm

Sheet B	1	2	3	4	5	6	7	8	Final
(Sweden) Oskar Eriksson 🔨	1	0	0	1	0	1	0	0	3
(Japan) Takumi Maeda	0	2	1	0	1	0	1	1	6

Sheet D	1	2	3	4	5	6	7	8	Final
(Japan) Tsuyoshi Yamaguchi 🔨	0	1	0	0	2	0	0	2	5
(Japan) Kaito Fujii	0	0	0	1	0	0	3	0	4

==== Third place game ====
Sunday, September 20, 11:00 am

Sheet C	1	2	3	4	5	6	7	8	Final
(Sweden) Oskar Eriksson 🔨	0	1	1	0	0	0	2	1	5
(Japan) Kaito Fujii	0	0	0	1	0	1	0	0	2

==== Final ====
Sunday, September 20, 11:00 am

Sheet E	1	2	3	4	5	6	7	8	Final
(Japan) Takumi Maeda	0	1	0	0	0	0	2	0	3
(Japan) Tsuyoshi Yamaguchi 🔨	1	0	0	0	0	1	0	2	4

== Women ==
=== Teams ===
The teams are listed as follows:

Skip	Third	Second	Lead	Alternate	Locale
Koharu Arai (Fourth)	Rin Shigihara	Lisa Yamamoto	Mai Akahoshi (Skip)	Ai Kawata	Karuizawa, Japan
Satsuki Fujisawa	Yako Matsuzawa	Yumi Suzuki	– (Note: Team Fujisawa played with three players.)		Kitami, Japan
Ha Seung-youn	– (Note: Team Ha played with three players.)	Kim Cho-hi	Kim Seon-yeong		Gangneung, South Korea
Kim Kyeong-ae (Note: Kim Kyeong-ae skipped Team Kang as Kang Bo-bae was training with the mixed doubles national team. Kim Min-seo moved from alternate to third.)	Kim Min-seo	Shim Yu-jeong	Kim Ji-soo		Jeonbuk, South Korea
Kim Eun-jung	Park Han-byul	Kim Su-hyeon	Bang Yu-jin	Kim Hae-jeong	Uiseong, South Korea
Kim Ji-yoon	Lee Eun-chae	Lee Hae-in	Yang Seung-hee		Seoul, South Korea
Ikue Kitazawa	Seina Nakajima	Minori Suzuki	Hasumi Ishigooka		Nagano, Japan
Mina Kobayashi	Kaho Onodera	Yuna Kotani	Anna Ohmiya		Sapporo, Japan
Yuina Miura	Kohane Tsuruga	Rin Suzuki	Aone Nakamura		Sapporo, Japan
Yumi Suzuki	Aki Goto	Kyoka Kuramitsu	Runa Miura	Miho Fujimori	Tokyo, Japan
Kotone Suzuki (Fourth)	Moka Tanaka (Skip)	Minami Nakao	Akari Hashimoto	Hana Ikeda	Sapporo, Japan
Isabella Wranå	Almida de Val	Moa Dryburgh	Maria Larsson		Sundbyberg, Sweden

=== Round robin standings ===
Final Round Robin Standings

Key
Teams to Playoffs

Pool A	W	L	W–L	PF	PA	DSC
(South Korea) Team Kang	4	1	1–1	30	19	6.20
(Japan) Ikue Kitazawa	4	1	1–1	29	20	34.40
(Japan) Satsuki Fujisawa	4	1	1–1	32	25	46.76
(South Korea) Kim Eun-jung	2	3	–	25	24	
(Japan) Yuina Miura	1	4	–	22	30	
(Japan) Mai Akahoshi	0	5	–	16	36	

Pool B	W	L	W–L	PF	PA
(Sweden) Isabella Wranå	5	0	–	34	17
(South Korea) Ha Seung-youn	4	1	–	44	19
(Japan) Moka Tanaka	3	2	–	22	20
(Japan) Mina Kobayashi	2	3	–	22	29
(South Korea) Kim Ji-yoon	1	4	–	20	32
(Japan) Yumi Suzuki	0	5	–	15	40

=== Round robin results ===
All draw times are listed in Japan Standard Time (UTC+09:00).

==== Draw 1 ====
Thursday, September 17, 9:00 am

Sheet B	1	2	3	4	5	6	7	8	Final
(South Korea) Team Kang	0	2	0	0	3	0	2	X	7
(Japan) Mai Akahoshi 🔨	0	0	0	1	0	2	0	X	3

Sheet D	1	2	3	4	5	6	7	8	Final
(South Korea) Kim Eun-jung	0	1	3	1	0	3	0	X	8
(Japan) Yuina Miura 🔨	0	0	0	0	1	0	2	X	3

Sheet F	1	2	3	4	5	6	7	8	Final
(Japan) Mina Kobayashi 🔨	0	3	0	1	0	1	0	2	7
(Japan) Yumi Suzuki	1	0	0	0	1	0	1	0	3

==== Draw 2 ====
Thursday, September 17, 12:30 pm

Sheet A	1	2	3	4	5	6	7	8	Final
(Sweden) Isabella Wranå 🔨	1	1	1	1	0	2	0	X	6
(Japan) Moka Tanaka	0	0	0	0	1	0	1	X	2

Sheet C	1	2	3	4	5	6	7	8	Final
(South Korea) Kim Ji-yoon	0	0	0	0	0	2	0	X	2
(South Korea) Ha Seung-youn 🔨	0	2	1	1	2	0	3	X	9

Sheet E	1	2	3	4	5	6	7	8	Final
(Japan) Ikue Kitazawa 🔨	1	1	0	0	2	0	0	0	4
(Japan) Satsuki Fujisawa	0	0	0	1	0	3	1	1	6

==== Draw 3 ====
Thursday, September 17, 4:00 pm

Sheet B	1	2	3	4	5	6	7	8	Final
(Japan) Yuina Miura 🔨	2	0	0	1	0	1	0	X	4
(Japan) Ikue Kitazawa	0	2	2	0	1	0	2	X	7

Sheet D	1	2	3	4	5	6	7	8	Final
(Sweden) Isabella Wranå	2	0	1	1	4	0	X	X	8
(Japan) Yumi Suzuki 🔨	0	0	0	0	0	1	X	X	1

Sheet F	1	2	3	4	5	6	7	8	Final
(South Korea) Kim Eun-jung 🔨	0	3	0	2	0	1	0	1	7
(Japan) Mai Akahoshi	1	0	2	0	1	0	1	0	5

==== Draw 4 ====
Thursday, September 17, 7:30 pm

Sheet A	1	2	3	4	5	6	7	8	Final
(Japan) Mina Kobayashi 🔨	0	1	0	0	2	0	0	2	5
(South Korea) Kim Ji-yoon	0	0	0	1	0	1	1	0	3

Sheet C	1	2	3	4	5	6	7	8	Final
(South Korea) Team Kang 🔨	1	0	0	0	0	2	0	6	9
(Japan) Satsuki Fujisawa	0	1	0	0	0	0	3	0	4

Sheet E	1	2	3	4	5	6	7	8	Final
(Japan) Moka Tanaka	0	0	0	2	0	0	1	0	3
(South Korea) Ha Seung-youn 🔨	0	2	0	0	1	2	0	2	7

==== Draw 5 ====
Friday, September 18, 9:00 am

Sheet B	1	2	3	4	5	6	7	8	Final
(Japan) Mina Kobayashi	0	0	0	0	2	0	0	X	2
(Japan) Moka Tanaka 🔨	0	0	2	1	0	1	3	X	7

Sheet D	1	2	3	4	5	6	7	8	Final
(Japan) Satsuki Fujisawa	1	2	0	3	1	0	3	X	10
(Japan) Mai Akahoshi 🔨	0	0	2	0	0	1	0	X	3

Sheet F	1	2	3	4	5	6	7	8	Final
(South Korea) Team Kang 🔨	0	1	0	0	2	0	0	X	3
(Japan) Ikue Kitazawa	0	0	1	1	0	2	2	X	6

==== Draw 6 ====
Friday, September 18, 12:30 pm

Sheet A	1	2	3	4	5	6	7	8	9	Final
(South Korea) Ha Seung-youn 🔨	1	0	1	0	1	0	3	0	0	6
(Sweden) Isabella Wranå	0	2	0	1	0	1	0	2	1	7

Sheet C	1	2	3	4	5	6	7	8	Final
(Japan) Yumi Suzuki	0	0	4	0	1	0	1	0	6
(South Korea) Kim Ji-yoon 🔨	3	1	0	1	0	2	0	1	8

Sheet E	1	2	3	4	5	6	7	8	Final
(Japan) Mai Akahoshi	0	0	0	1	0	0	1	0	2
(Japan) Yuina Miura 🔨	0	2	1	0	1	0	0	2	6

==== Draw 7 ====
Friday, September 18, 4:00 pm

Sheet B	1	2	3	4	5	6	7	8	Final
(South Korea) Kim Eun-jung	0	1	0	1	0	1	0	X	3
(South Korea) Team Kang 🔨	1	0	2	0	1	0	1	X	5

Sheet D	1	2	3	4	5	6	7	8	Final
(Japan) Yumi Suzuki	0	0	1	0	1	0	1	X	3
(Japan) Moka Tanaka 🔨	1	1	0	2	0	1	0	X	5

Sheet F	1	2	3	4	5	6	7	8	Final
(South Korea) Ha Seung-youn	0	0	3	0	4	0	3	X	10
(Japan) Mina Kobayashi 🔨	2	0	0	1	0	2	0	X	5

==== Draw 8 ====
Friday, September 18, 7:30 pm

Sheet A	1	2	3	4	5	6	7	8	9	Final
(Japan) Satsuki Fujisawa 🔨	2	0	1	0	1	0	2	0	1	7
(Japan) Yuina Miura	0	0	0	1	0	1	0	4	0	6

Sheet C	1	2	3	4	5	6	7	8	Final
(Japan) Ikue Kitazawa 🔨	2	0	0	2	0	1	0	1	6
(South Korea) Kim Eun-jung	0	1	0	0	1	0	2	0	4

Sheet E	1	2	3	4	5	6	7	8	Final
(South Korea) Kim Ji-yoon 🔨	2	1	1	0	0	0	1	0	5
(Sweden) Isabella Wranå	0	0	0	2	2	2	0	1	7

==== Draw 9 ====
Saturday, September 19, 9:00 am

Sheet B	1	2	3	4	5	6	7	8	Final
(South Korea) Ha Seung-youn 🔨	2	2	0	4	0	4	X	X	12
(Japan) Yumi Suzuki	0	0	1	0	1	0	X	X	2

Sheet D	1	2	3	4	5	6	7	8	Final
(Japan) Yuina Miura 🔨	1	0	0	0	2	0	0	X	3
(South Korea) Team Kang	0	2	1	1	0	1	1	X	6

Sheet F	1	2	3	4	5	6	7	8	Final
(Japan) Moka Tanaka	0	2	0	1	0	0	2	X	5
(South Korea) Kim Ji-yoon 🔨	0	0	1	0	0	1	0	X	2

==== Draw 10 ====
Saturday, September 19, 12:30 pm

Sheet A	1	2	3	4	5	6	7	8	Final
(Japan) Mai Akahoshi	0	0	1	1	0	1	0	X	3
(Japan) Ikue Kitazawa 🔨	2	1	0	0	1	0	2	X	6

Sheet C	1	2	3	4	5	6	7	8	Final
(Sweden) Isabella Wranå 🔨	2	2	0	0	1	0	1	X	6
(Japan) Mina Kobayashi	0	0	2	0	0	1	0	X	3

Sheet E	1	2	3	4	5	6	7	8	Final
(Japan) Satsuki Fujisawa	0	0	0	1	0	4	0	X	5
(South Korea) Kim Eun-jung 🔨	0	1	0	0	1	0	1	X	3

=== Playoffs ===
Quarterfinals
B2	(South Korea) Ha Seung-youn	8
A3	(Japan) Satsuki Fujisawa	2
A2	(Japan) Ikue Kitazawa	8
B3	(Japan) Moka Tanaka	5

Semifinals
A1	(South Korea) Team Kang	8
B2	(South Korea) Ha Seung-youn	1
B1	(Sweden) Isabella Wranå	4
A2	(Japan) Ikue Kitazawa	3

Final
A1	(South Korea) Team Kang	2
B1	(Sweden) Isabella Wranå	6
Third place game
B2	(South Korea) Ha Seung-youn	7
A2	(Japan) Ikue Kitazawa	4

==== Quarterfinals ====
Saturday, September 19, 4:00 pm

Sheet B	1	2	3	4	5	6	7	8	Final
(Japan) Ikue Kitazawa 🔨	2	0	3	0	2	0	0	1	8
(Japan) Moka Tanaka	0	1	0	1	0	2	1	0	5

Sheet D	1	2	3	4	5	6	7	8	Final
(South Korea) Ha Seung-youn 🔨	3	0	3	1	0	1	X	X	8
(Japan) Satsuki Fujisawa	0	1	0	0	1	0	X	X	2

==== Semifinals ====
Saturday, September 19, 7:30 pm

Sheet C	1	2	3	4	5	6	7	8	Final
(South Korea) Team Kang	1	0	0	2	2	3	X	X	8
(South Korea) Ha Seung-youn 🔨	0	0	1	0	0	0	X	X	1

Sheet E	1	2	3	4	5	6	7	8	Final
(Sweden) Isabella Wranå 🔨	1	0	1	0	0	1	0	1	4
(Japan) Ikue Kitazawa	0	0	0	2	0	0	1	0	3

==== Third place game ====
Sunday, September 20, 11:00 am

Sheet D	1	2	3	4	5	6	7	8	Final
(South Korea) Ha Seung-youn	0	1	2	0	2	0	2	X	7
(Japan) Ikue Kitazawa 🔨	1	0	0	2	0	1	0	X	4

==== Final ====
Sunday, September 20, 11:00 am

Sheet B	1	2	3	4	5	6	7	8	Final
(South Korea) Team Kang 🔨	0	1	0	0	0	1	0	X	2
(Sweden) Isabella Wranå	1	0	1	1	1	0	2	X	6
