= Kim Ji-yoon (curler) =

South Korean curler

- Curler
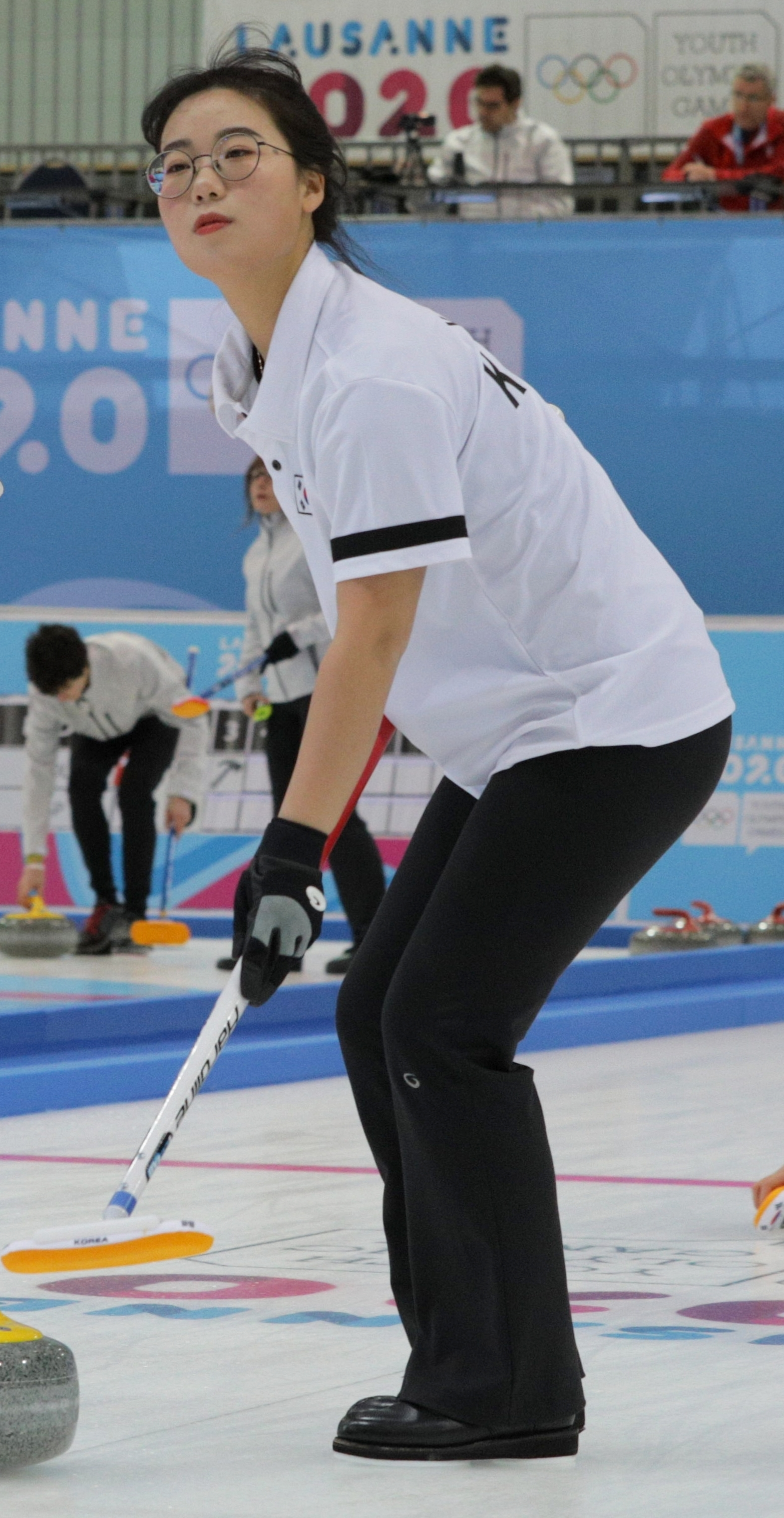
- Kim at the 2020 Winter Youth Olympics
- Born: July 2, 2002 (age 24); Uijeongbu, South Korea

Team
- Curling club: Seoul CC, Seoul
- Skip: Kim Ji-yoon
- Third: Lee Eun-chae
- Second: Lee Hae-in
- Lead: Yang Seung-hee
- Mixed doubles partner: Lee Ki-jeong

Curling career
- Member Association: South Korea
- World Mixed Doubles Championship: 3 (2021, 2023, 2024)
Medal record
Representing Gyeonggi
Korean Mixed Doubles Championship
| Bronze medal – third place | 2020 Gangneung |
Representing Seoul
Korean Women's Championship
| Bronze medal – third place | 2026 Uiseong |
Korean Mixed Doubles Championship
| Gold medal – first place | 2022 Jincheon |
| Gold medal – first place | 2023 Uijeongbu |

Kim Ji-yoon (Korean: 김지윤; born July 2, 2002, in Uijeongbu) is a South Korean curler from Seoul. She currently skips the Seoul City Hall curling team. While playing mixed doubles with Jeong Byeong-jin, she participated in three World Mixed Doubles Curling Championships (2021, 2023, 2024).

== Career ==
In 2020, Kim competed in the 2020 Winter Youth Olympics with teammates Park Sang-woo, Park You-been and Moon Si-woo. In the mixed team competition, the team finished with a 3–2 record, narrowly missing the playoffs following losses to Canada and Russia. The next week, she played in the mixed doubles event with Denmark's Jonathan Vilandt. The pair lost their first game and were eliminated in the round of 48.

During the 2020–21 season, Kim and her mixed doubles partner Moon Si-woo finished third at the 2020 Korean Mixed Doubles Championship. Later in the season, the pair won the qualification event for the right to represent South Korea at the 2021 World Mixed Doubles Curling Championship. The duo, both eighteen at the time, defeated 2018 Olympian Jang Hye-ji and her partner Seong Yu-jin 2–0 in the best-of-three series. At the World Championship in Aberdeen, Scotland, Kim and Moon finished ninth in their pool with a 3–6 record, forcing them to play a relegation game to retain Korea's berth in the championship. Facing Japan's Yurika Yoshida and Yuta Matsumura, the Korean pair lost 8–6, relegating Korea to the 2021 Qualification Event. At the 2021 Korean Mixed Doubles Curling Championship, which doubled as the Olympic Trials for the 2022 Winter Olympics, Kim and Moon finished in fourth place, failing to defend their spot as the national mixed doubles team.

At the conclusion of the 2021–22 season, Kim moved from Gyeonggido to Seoul, forming a new mixed doubles team with Jeong Byeong-jin for the 2022–23 season. At the 2022 Korean Mixed Doubles Curling Championship, the team won all four of their games to win the national title, defeating Kim Eun-bi and Yoo Min-hyeon 7–5 in the championship game. This once again earned Kim a spot on the national team. On tour, she and Jeong won the Goldline Victoria Mixed Doubles, her first tour event victory. They also reached the final of the Walker Industries Mixed Doubles Spiel and the semifinals of the second Alberta Curling Series Doubles event. Despite their successes throughout the season, they could not continue their impressive performance at the 2023 World Mixed Doubles Curling Championship, finishing 2–7 in the round robin. This forced them into a relegation playoff where they defeated Austria 8–6 to maintain Korea's position in the championship.

For the 2023–24 season, Kim joined the Seoul City Hall women's team, however, they failed to qualify at the 2023 Korean Curling Championships. This drought continued into the 2023 Korean Mixed Doubles Curling Championship where she and Jeong lost two of their first three games. After this, however, the pair turned things around, winning their next five games to finish first in their pool and qualify for the playoffs. Once there, they won both the semifinal and final series' 2–0 and 2–1 respectively to defend their title as national champions. On tour that season, they reached two semifinals and one quarterfinal against stacked fields at Super Series events, boosting their world ranking to nineteenth. In April, Kim had her best showing at the 2024 World Mixed Doubles Curling Championship, finishing 5–4 and just missing the playoffs.

== Personal life ==
Kim is originally from Gyeonggi Province but moved to Seoul in 2022. She previously attended Hoeryong Middle School and Songhyun High School.

== Teams ==
| Season | Skip | Third | Second | Lead | Alternate |
|---|---|---|---|---|---|
| 2016–17 | Kwon Sol | Kim Ji-yoon | Jeong In-hee | Lim Seo-lyn | Yi Soo-hyeon |
| 2017–18 | Kim Ji-yoon | Yi Soo-hyeon | Lee Eun-chae | Lim Seo-lyn | |
| 2018–19 | Kwon Sol | Kang Chae-rin | Park You-been | Kim Ji-yoon | Lee Su-hyeon |
| 2019–20 | Park You-been | Kim Ji-yoon | Kang Chae-rin | Lee Su-hyeon | Kwon Sol |
| 2023–24 | Park You-been | Lee Eun-chae | Yang Seung-hee | Kim Ji-yoon | |
| 2024–25 | Lee Eun-chae | Park You-been | Yang Seung-hee | Kim Ji-yoon | |
| 2025–26 | Park You-been | Lee Eun-chae | Kim Ji-yoon | Yang Seung-hee | |
| 2026–27 | Kim Ji-yoon | Lee Eun-chae | Lee Hae-in | Yang Seung-hee | |
