= 2026 Korean Curling Championships =

2026 KB Financial Korean Curling Championships
- Host city: Uiseong, South Korea
- Arena: Uiseong Curling Center
- Dates: June 11–16
- Men's winner: Uiseong-gun Office
- Curling club: Uiseong CC, Uiseong
- Skip: Jeong Byeong-jin
- Third: Kim Hyo-jun
- Second: Pyo Jeong-min
- Lead: Kim Jin-hun
- Alternate: Kim Dae-hyun
- Coach: Lee Dong-keun
- Finalist: Gyeongbuk Sports Council (C. Kim)
- Women's winner: Gyeonggi Province
- Curling club: Uijeongbu CC, Uijeongbu
- Skip: Gim Eun-ji
- Third: Kim Min-ji
- Second: Kim Su-ji
- Lead: Seol Ye-eun
- Alternate: Seol Ye-ji
- Coach: Shin Dong-ho
- Finalist: Chuncheon City Hall (Park)

The 2026 Korean Curling Championships, (branded as the 2026 KB Financial Korean Curling Championships), South Korea's national curling championships, were held from June 11 to 16 at the Uiseong Curling Center in Uiseong, South Korea. The winning teams on both the men's and women's sides became the South Korean National Teams for the 2026–27 curling season. They will represent South Korea at the 2027 World Curling Championships. Both the men's and women's events were played in a round robin format. The top two men's teams advanced directly to the final while the top four women's teams advanced to the semifinals.

The women's event introduced many new teams that had formed following the conclusion of the 2025–26 Olympic season. The biggest shake up came with the dissolution of Kim Eun-jung's Gangneung rink who had previously been together for 17 years. Kim Eun-jung herself moved back to her hometown of Uiseong to skip the young Kim Su-hyeon team while third Kim Kyeong-ae joined the two-time reigning world junior champions Kang Bo-bae from Jeonbuk. Front-enders Kim Cho-hi and Kim Seon-yeong remained in Gangneung and added Ha Seung-youn and Kim Hye-rin as their skip and third respectively. Ha and Kim previously played in Chuncheon with Yang Tae-i and Kim Su-jin who also remained together and rounded out their team with Park You-been and Park Seo-jin. The last lineup that saw a change was Seoul City Hall which was taken over at skip by Kim Ji-yoon following the departure of Park You-been. The only team that remained together was the three-time reigning national champions Gim Eun-ji rink from Gyeonggi.

== Medalists ==
	Gold	Silver	Bronze
Men	Uiseong-gun Office; Jeong Byeong-jin; Kim Hyo-jun; Pyo Jeong-min; Kim Jin-hun; Kim Dae-hyun	Gyeongbuk Sports Council; Kim Chang-min; Yoo Min-hyeon; Shin Eun-jin	Gangwon Province; Park Jong-duk; Jeong Yeong-seok; Oh Seung-hoon; Lee Ki-bok; Seong Ji-hoon
Women	Gyeonggi Province; Gim Eun-ji; Kim Min-ji; Kim Su-ji; Seol Ye-eun; Seol Ye-ji	Chuncheon City Hall; Park You-been; Park Seo-jin; Yang Tae-i; Kim Su-jin	Gangneung City Hall; Ha Seung-youn; Kim Hye-rin; Kim Cho-hi; Kim Seon-yeong
Women	Gyeonggi Province; Gim Eun-ji; Kim Min-ji; Kim Su-ji; Seol Ye-eun; Seol Ye-ji	Chuncheon City Hall; Park You-been; Park Seo-jin; Yang Tae-i; Kim Su-jin	Seoul City Hall; Kim Ji-yoon; Lee Eun-chae; Lee Hae-in; Yang Seung-hee

== Men ==
=== Teams ===
The teams are listed as follows:

Team	Skip	Third	Second	Lead	Alternate	Locale
Gangwon Province	Park Jong-duk	Jeong Yeong-seok	Oh Seung-hoon	Lee Ki-bok	Seong Ji-hoon	Gangwon
Gyeongbuk Sports Council	Kim Chang-min	Yoo Min-hyeon	– (Note: Gyeongbuk Sports Council played with three players as third Kim Soo-hyuk was facing medical issues and alternate Jeon Jae-ik was enlisted to the Republic of Korea Army.)	Shin Eun-jin		Uiseong
Kwandong University	Kim Hak-jun	Moon Si-woo	Yoo Tae-jeong	Lee Han-joo		Gangneung
Kyungil University	Lee Woo-jung	Seol Dong-seok	Choi Jae-hyeok	Kwon Jun-i	Park Seong-min	Daegu
Seoul City Hall	Lee Jae-beom	Kim Min-woo	Kim San	Kim Jeong-min		Seoul
Uiseong High School	Kim Hye-jeong	Park Jeong-min	Shin Seong-ho	Kim Dan-woo	Park Seol-hyeon	Uiseong
Uiseong-gun Office	Jeong Byeong-jin	Kim Hyo-jun	Pyo Jeong-min	Kim Jin-hun	Kim Dae-hyun	Uiseong

=== Round robin standings ===
Final Round Robin Standings

Key
Teams to Final

Team	Skip	W	L	W–L	PF	PA	EW	EL	BE	SE	DSC
Uiseong-gun Office	Jeong Byeong-jin	5	1	1–0	40	20	19	17	8	5	29.7
Gyeongbuk Sports Council	Kim Chang-min	5	1	0–1	46	24	25	16	8	8	12.2
Gangwon Province	Park Jong-duk	4	2	1–0	42	34	25	23	4	5	31.4
Seoul City Hall	Lee Jae-beom	4	2	0–1	40	31	22	20	6	6	31.2
Kwandong University	Kim Hak-jun	2	4	–	28	47	19	20	5	5	26.0
Uiseong High School	Kim Hye-jeong	1	5	–	28	37	19	24	8	3	40.8
Kyungil University	Lee Woo-jung	0	6	–	18	49	14	23	2	0	58.1

=== Round robin results ===
All draws are listed in Korea Standard Time (UTC+09:00).

==== Draw 2 ====
Thursday, June 11, 2:00 pm

Sheet A	1	2	3	4	5	6	7	8	9	10	Final
Kyungil University (W. Lee)	0	0	1	0	0	1	0	1	X	X	3
Seoul City Hall (J. Lee) 🔨	0	2	0	2	0	0	4	0	X	X	8

Sheet B	1	2	3	4	5	6	7	8	9	10	Final
Uiseong High School (Hy. Kim)	0	0	1	0	0	2	0	1	1	X	5
Kwandong University (Ha. Kim) 🔨	2	0	0	4	0	0	2	0	0	X	8

Sheet C	1	2	3	4	5	6	7	8	9	10	Final
Uiseong-gun Office (Jeong)	0	0	2	0	0	2	0	2	0	X	6
Gangwon Province (Park) 🔨	0	1	0	1	0	0	0	0	2	X	4

==== Draw 4 ====
Friday, June 12, 9:00 am

Sheet B	1	2	3	4	5	6	7	8	9	10	Final
Seoul City Hall (J. Lee) 🔨	1	2	0	2	0	0	0	0	2	0	7
Gangwon Province (Park)	0	0	1	0	2	2	0	1	0	2	8

Sheet C	1	2	3	4	5	6	7	8	9	10	Final
Gyeongbuk Sports Council (C. Kim) 🔨	3	0	1	1	1	0	0	1	X	X	7
Uiseong High School (Hy. Kim)	0	0	0	0	0	1	0	0	X	X	1

Sheet D	1	2	3	4	5	6	7	8	9	10	Final
Kwandong University (Ha. Kim) 🔨	1	0	0	1	1	0	0	0	X	X	3
Uiseong-gun Office (Jeong)	0	3	0	0	0	0	5	2	X	X	10

==== Draw 6 ====
Friday, June 12, 7:00 pm

Sheet A	1	2	3	4	5	6	7	8	9	10	Final
Gyeongbuk Sports Council (C. Kim) 🔨	0	1	0	0	0	0	1	0	1	0	3
Uiseong-gun Office (Jeong)	0	0	0	2	0	0	0	1	0	2	5

Sheet C	1	2	3	4	5	6	7	8	9	10	Final
Seoul City Hall (J. Lee)	0	2	0	0	2	0	5	0	2	X	11
Kwandong University (Ha. Kim) 🔨	1	0	1	0	0	1	0	3	0	X	6

Sheet D	1	2	3	4	5	6	7	8	9	10	Final
Gangwon Province (Park) 🔨	0	3	0	1	0	1	0	2	1	X	8
Kyungil University (W. Lee)	0	0	2	0	1	0	2	0	0	X	5

==== Draw 8 ====
Saturday, June 13, 2:00 pm

Sheet A	1	2	3	4	5	6	7	8	9	10	Final
Kwandong University (Ha. Kim)	1	0	0	1	0	1	0	X	X	X	3
Gangwon Province (Park) 🔨	0	2	2	0	2	0	3	X	X	X	9

Sheet B	1	2	3	4	5	6	7	8	9	10	Final
Kyungil University (W. Lee)	0	0	1	0	1	0	X	X	X	X	2
Gyeongbuk Sports Council (C. Kim) 🔨	0	3	0	3	0	3	X	X	X	X	9

Sheet D	1	2	3	4	5	6	7	8	9	10	Final
Uiseong High School (Hy. Kim) 🔨	0	1	0	0	0	0	0	0	1	X	2
Seoul City Hall (J. Lee)	0	0	1	0	1	0	1	1	0	X	4

==== Draw 10 ====
Sunday, June 14, 9:00 am

Sheet A	1	2	3	4	5	6	7	8	9	10	Final
Uiseong High School (Hy. Kim)	0	1	0	4	0	1	0	1	4	X	11
Kyungil University (W. Lee) 🔨	1	0	1	0	1	0	1	0	0	X	4

Sheet B	1	2	3	4	5	6	7	8	9	10	11	Final
Uiseong-gun Office (Jeong)	0	0	0	2	0	0	0	0	1	0	0	3
Seoul City Hall (J. Lee) 🔨	0	0	1	0	1	0	0	0	0	1	1	4

Sheet C	1	2	3	4	5	6	7	8	9	10	Final
Gangwon Province (Park)	0	0	0	2	0	1	3	0	1	0	7
Gyeongbuk Sports Council (C. Kim) 🔨	1	1	2	0	3	0	0	1	0	1	9

==== Draw 12 ====
Sunday, June 14, 7:00 pm

Sheet B	1	2	3	4	5	6	7	8	9	10	Final
Gangwon Province (Park) 🔨	0	2	0	0	1	0	2	0	0	1	6
Uiseong High School (Hy. Kim)	0	0	1	1	0	1	0	0	1	0	4

Sheet C	1	2	3	4	5	6	7	8	9	10	Final
Kyungil University (W. Lee)	0	0	1	0	0	0	X	X	X	X	1
Uiseong-gun Office (Jeong) 🔨	0	2	0	2	1	3	X	X	X	X	8

Sheet D	1	2	3	4	5	6	7	8	9	10	Final
Gyeongbuk Sports Council (C. Kim) 🔨	0	1	4	0	0	0	3	1	X	X	9
Kwandong University (Ha. Kim)	0	0	0	1	1	1	0	0	X	X	3

==== Draw 14 ====
Monday, June 15, 2:00 pm

Sheet A	1	2	3	4	5	6	7	8	9	10	Final
Seoul City Hall (J. Lee)	0	0	0	0	3	1	0	2	0	0	6
Gyeongbuk Sports Council (C. Kim) 🔨	0	0	2	0	0	0	1	0	4	2	9

Sheet B	1	2	3	4	5	6	7	8	9	10	Final
Kwandong University (Ha. Kim) 🔨	0	0	0	0	2	0	1	0	2	X	5
Kyungil University (W. Lee)	0	0	0	0	0	0	0	3	0	X	3

Sheet D	1	2	3	4	5	6	7	8	9	10	Final
Uiseong-gun Office (Jeong) 🔨	1	0	0	0	1	0	5	1	0	X	8
Uiseong High School (Hy. Kim)	0	0	1	0	0	3	0	0	1	X	5

=== Playoffs ===
Gold medal game
1	Uiseong-gun Office	6
2	Gyeongbuk Sports Council	2

==== Gold medal game ====
Tuesday, June 16, 2:30 pm

Sheet B	1	2	3	4	5	6	7	8	9	10	Final
Uiseong-gun Office (Jeong) 🔨	2	0	0	0	0	3	1	0	0	X	6
Gyeongbuk Sports Council (C. Kim)	0	0	0	1	0	0	0	0	1	X	2

2026 Korean Curling Championships
(South Korea)
Jeong Byeong-jin
3rd Korean Championship title

=== Final standings ===
Place	Team	Skip
1st place, gold medalist(s)	Uiseong-gun Office	Jeong Byeong-jin
2nd place, silver medalist(s)	Gyeongbuk Sports Council	Kim Chang-min
3rd place, bronze medalist(s)	Gangwon Province	Park Jong-duk
4	Seoul City Hall	Lee Jae-beom
5	Kwandong University	Kim Hak-jun
6	Uiseong High School	Kim Hye-jeong
7	Kyungil University	Lee Woo-jung

== Women ==
=== Teams ===
The teams are listed as follows:

Team	Skip	Third	Second	Lead	Alternate	Locale
Chuncheon City Hall	Park You-been	Park Seo-jin	Yang Tae-i	Kim Su-jin		Chuncheon
Gangneung City Hall	Ha Seung-youn	Kim Hye-rin	Kim Cho-hi	Kim Seon-yeong		Gangneung
Gyeonggi Province	Gim Eun-ji	Kim Min-ji	Kim Su-ji	Seol Ye-eun	Seol Ye-ji	Uijeongbu
Jeonbuk Province	Kang Bo-bae	Kim Kyeong-ae	Shim Yu-jeong	Kim Ji-soo	Kim Min-seo	Jeonbuk
Seoul City Hall	Kim Ji-yoon	Lee Eun-chae	Lee Hae-in	Yang Seung-hee		Seoul
Songhyun High School	Kim A-yeon	Won Bo-yeon	Cho Ga-hee	Hong Soo-ah	Kim Tae-eun	Uijeongbu
Uiseong-gun Office	Kim Su-hyeon (Note: Kim Su-hyeon skipped Uiseong-gun Office as skip Kim Eun-jung was facing medical issues. Alternate Bang Yu-jin played third.)	Bang Yu-jin	Kim Hae-jeong	Park Han-byul		Uiseong
Yubong Girls' High School	Cho Yeon-ah	Yoo Ju-won	Kim Si-hyeon	Kwon Min-seo		Chuncheon

=== Round robin standings ===
Final Round Robin Standings

Key
Teams to Playoffs

Team	Skip	W	L	W–L	PF	PA	EW	EL	BE	SE	DSC
Gyeonggi Province	Gim Eun-ji	6	1	–	55	31	29	20	4	11	30.0
Gangneung City Hall	Ha Seung-youn	5	2	–	44	35	25	24	8	3	32.2
Chuncheon City Hall	Park You-been	4	3	1–1	46	30	27	21	8	8	21.4
Seoul City Hall	Kim Ji-yoon	4	3	1–1	45	36	23	21	3	7	34.3
Jeonbuk Province	Kang Bo-bae	4	3	1–1	48	35	24	18	7	6	35.5
Uiseong-gun Office	Kim Su-hyeon	3	4	–	44	38	24	23	3	7	51.0
Songhyun High School	Kim A-yeon	2	5	–	27	55	19	26	4	1	55.7
Yubong Girls' High School	Cho Yeon-ah	0	7	–	17	66	14	31	1	1	84.7

=== Round robin results ===
All draws are listed in Korea Standard Time (UTC+09:00).

==== Draw 1 ====
Thursday, June 11, 9:00 am

Sheet A	1	2	3	4	5	6	7	8	9	10	Final
Uiseong-gun Office (S. Kim) 🔨	1	0	0	2	3	0	1	0	4	X	11
Yubong Girls' High School (Cho)	0	0	2	0	0	1	0	1	0	X	4

Sheet B	1	2	3	4	5	6	7	8	9	10	11	Final
Chuncheon City Hall (Park) 🔨	0	1	0	2	0	1	0	0	0	1	0	5
Gangneung City Hall (Ha)	0	0	2	0	1	0	2	0	0	0	1	6

Sheet C	1	2	3	4	5	6	7	8	9	10	Final
Songhyun High School (A. Kim) 🔨	0	0	1	0	0	0	1	0	1	X	3
Seoul City Hall (J. Kim)	0	1	0	1	0	3	0	1	0	X	6

Sheet D	1	2	3	4	5	6	7	8	9	10	Final
Gyeonggi Province (Gim) 🔨	0	0	3	0	0	2	0	0	X	X	5
Jeonbuk Province (Kang)	0	2	0	1	4	0	3	2	X	X	12

==== Draw 3 ====
Thursday, June 11, 7:00 pm

Sheet A	1	2	3	4	5	6	7	8	9	10	Final
Seoul City Hall (J. Kim)	0	1	0	0	2	0	0	3	1	X	7
Gangneung City Hall (Ha) 🔨	0	0	0	1	0	1	0	0	0	X	2

Sheet B	1	2	3	4	5	6	7	8	9	10	Final
Jeonbuk Province (Kang) 🔨	1	1	2	0	2	0	3	X	X	X	9
Yubong Girls' High School (Cho)	0	0	0	1	0	1	0	X	X	X	2

Sheet C	1	2	3	4	5	6	7	8	9	10	Final
Gyeonggi Province (Gim)	0	0	1	1	0	0	0	2	2	X	6
Chuncheon City Hall (Park) 🔨	0	1	0	0	0	2	0	0	0	X	3

Sheet D	1	2	3	4	5	6	7	8	9	10	Final
Songhyun High School (A. Kim)	0	1	0	0	2	0	0	X	X	X	3
Uiseong-gun Office (S. Kim) 🔨	2	0	2	2	0	4	3	X	X	X	13

==== Draw 5 ====
Friday, June 12, 2:00 pm

Sheet A	1	2	3	4	5	6	7	8	9	10	Final
Songhyun High School (A. Kim)	0	1	0	0	0	1	0	1	0	X	3
Chuncheon City Hall (Park) 🔨	0	0	3	0	1	0	1	0	3	X	8

Sheet B	1	2	3	4	5	6	7	8	9	10	Final
Gyeonggi Province (Gim)	0	2	0	5	1	0	1	X	X	X	9
Seoul City Hall (J. Kim) 🔨	1	0	2	0	0	0	0	X	X	X	3

Sheet C	1	2	3	4	5	6	7	8	9	10	Final
Jeonbuk Province (Kang) 🔨	0	0	0	1	0	2	0	2	0	2	7
Uiseong-gun Office (S. Kim)	0	0	0	0	1	0	2	0	1	0	4

Sheet D	1	2	3	4	5	6	7	8	9	10	Final
Yubong Girls' High School (Cho)	0	0	1	0	0	0	X	X	X	X	1
Gangneung City Hall (Ha) 🔨	0	5	0	1	1	2	X	X	X	X	9

==== Draw 7 ====
Saturday, June 13, 9:00 am

Sheet A	1	2	3	4	5	6	7	8	9	10	Final
Gangneung City Hall (Ha)	0	1	0	1	0	2	0	0	1	X	5
Gyeonggi Province (Gim) 🔨	2	0	2	0	1	0	2	1	0	X	8

Sheet B	1	2	3	4	5	6	7	8	9	10	Final
Uiseong-gun Office (S. Kim)	0	0	0	0	0	1	1	0	X	X	2
Chuncheon City Hall (Park) 🔨	1	1	0	2	2	0	0	0	X	X	6

Sheet C	1	2	3	4	5	6	7	8	9	10	Final
Yubong Girls' High School (Cho)	0	0	1	0	3	0	1	0	X	X	5
Songhyun High School (A. Kim) 🔨	0	2	0	1	0	3	0	4	X	X	10

Sheet D	1	2	3	4	5	6	7	8	9	10	Final
Jeonbuk Province (Kang)	0	0	2	0	0	1	X	X	X	X	3
Seoul City Hall (J. Kim) 🔨	0	5	0	2	5	0	X	X	X	X	12

==== Draw 9 ====
Saturday, June 13, 7:00 pm

Sheet A	1	2	3	4	5	6	7	8	9	10	Final
Yubong Girls' High School (Cho)	0	1	0	1	0	0	X	X	X	X	2
Seoul City Hall (J. Kim) 🔨	3	0	2	0	2	2	X	X	X	X	9

Sheet B	1	2	3	4	5	6	7	8	9	10	Final
Gangneung City Hall (Ha) 🔨	0	3	0	2	0	0	3	0	X	X	8
Songhyun High School (A. Kim)	0	0	1	0	1	0	0	1	X	X	3

Sheet C	1	2	3	4	5	6	7	8	9	10	Final
Chuncheon City Hall (Park)	0	0	1	0	1	0	0	1	X	X	3
Jeonbuk Province (Kang) 🔨	0	2	0	1	0	3	1	0	X	X	7

Sheet D	1	2	3	4	5	6	7	8	9	10	Final
Uiseong-gun Office (S. Kim)	0	0	0	1	0	1	0	X	X	X	2
Gyeonggi Province (Gim) 🔨	0	2	2	0	1	0	4	X	X	X	9

==== Draw 11 ====
Sunday, June 14, 2:00 pm

Sheet A	1	2	3	4	5	6	7	8	9	10	Final
Jeonbuk Province (Kang) 🔨	0	4	0								L^
Songhyun High School (A. Kim)	0	0	1	/							W

Sheet B	1	2	3	4	5	6	7	8	9	10	Final
Yubong Girls' High School (Cho)	0	1	0	0	0	1	0	X	X	X	2
Gyeonggi Province (Gim) 🔨	0	0	3	2	1	0	2	X	X	X	8

Sheet C	1	2	3	4	5	6	7	8	9	10	Final
Uiseong-gun Office (S. Kim)	0	2	0	1	0	0	1	0	1	0	5
Gangneung City Hall (Ha) 🔨	1	0	0	0	0	3	0	1	0	1	6

Sheet D	1	2	3	4	5	6	7	8	9	10	Final
Seoul City Hall (J. Kim)	0	2	0	2	0	0	1	0	0	0	5
Chuncheon City Hall (Park) 🔨	3	0	1	0	0	1	0	2	0	3	10

^ Jeonbuk Province were disqualified from the match after incorrectly submitting their pre-match lineup.

==== Draw 13 ====
Monday, June 15, 9:00 am

Sheet A	1	2	3	4	5	6	7	8	9	10	Final
Chuncheon City Hall (Park) 🔨	2	2	0	2	3	1	X	X	X	X	10
Yubong Girls' High School (Cho)	0	0	1	0	0	0	X	X	X	X	1

Sheet B	1	2	3	4	5	6	7	8	9	10	Final
Seoul City Hall (J. Kim) 🔨	0	0	1	0	0	1	0	0	1	X	3
Uiseong-gun Office (S. Kim)	0	3	0	3	1	0	0	0	0	X	7

Sheet C	1	2	3	4	5	6	7	8	9	10	Final
Songhyun High School (A. Kim) 🔨	1	0	0	0	0	2	0	1	0	X	4
Gyeonggi Province (Gim)	0	1	2	2	1	0	2	0	2	X	10

Sheet D	1	2	3	4	5	6	7	8	9	10	Final
Gangneung City Hall (Ha)	0	3	0	0	1	0	0	2	0	2	8
Jeonbuk Province (Kang) 🔨	1	0	0	0	0	2	0	0	3	0	6

=== Playoffs ===
Semifinals
1	Gyeonggi Province	9
4	Seoul City Hall	5
2	Gangneung City Hall	5
3	Chuncheon City Hall	6

Final
1	Gyeonggi Province	7
3	Chuncheon City Hall	5

==== Semifinals ====
Monday, June 15, 7:00 pm

Sheet A	1	2	3	4	5	6	7	8	9	10	Final
Gyeonggi Province (Gim) 🔨	0	2	1	1	1	0	4	0	X	X	9
Seoul City Hall (J. Kim)	0	0	0	0	0	2	0	3	X	X	5

Sheet B	1	2	3	4	5	6	7	8	9	10	11	Final
Gangneung City Hall (Ha) 🔨	0	3	0	0	1	0	0	0	1	0	0	5
Chuncheon City Hall (Park)	0	0	2	0	0	2	0	0	0	1	1	6

==== Gold medal game ====
Tuesday, June 16, 2:30 pm

Sheet C	1	2	3	4	5	6	7	8	9	10	Final
Gyeonggi Province (Gim) 🔨	0	0	2	0	1	0	0	1	0	3	7
Chuncheon City Hall (Park)	0	0	0	1	0	1	1	0	2	0	5

2026 Korean Curling Championships
(South Korea)
Gim Eun-ji
8th Korean Championship title

=== Final standings ===
Place	Team	Skip
1st place, gold medalist(s)	Gyeonggi Province	Gim Eun-ji
2nd place, silver medalist(s)	Chuncheon City Hall	Park You-been
3rd place, bronze medalist(s)	Gangneung City Hall	Ha Seung-youn
3rd place, bronze medalist(s)	Seoul City Hall	Kim Ji-yoon
5	Jeonbuk Province	Kang Bo-bae
6	Uiseong-gun Office	Kim Su-hyeon
7	Songhyun High School	Kim A-yeon
8	Yubong Girls' High School	Cho Yeon-ah
