= Korean Mixed Doubles Curling Championship =

Annual South Korean curling championship

- Established: 2016
- 2026 host city: Uiseong, South Korea
- 2026 arena: Uiseong Curling Club
- 2026 champion: Jeonbuk (Kang Bo-bae / Kim Hak-jun)

The Korean Mixed Doubles Curling Championship (branded as the KB Financial Korean Mixed Doubles Curling Championship) are the annual Korean mixed doubles curling championships, organized by the Korean Curling Federation (KCF). The winners of the championship qualify for the Korean National Team.

Until 2019, the winning pair automatically earned the right to represent South Korea at the World Mixed Doubles Curling Championship. Beginning in 2020, the World Curling Federation reduced the World Championship field to twenty teams with the bottom four teams being relegated to the next years World Mixed Doubles Qualification Event. Based on the results of the previous year, the winning team now either qualifies directly for the World Championship or is sent to the Qualification Event where they need to place in the top four to qualify.

Every four years, the winners also qualify to represent South Korea at the Winter Olympic Games if the country received a berth through world championship points. Starting in 2024, the championship also qualifies the winners for the Asian Winter Games if it is held during the season they are the national team.

The national championship is usually held in July or August following the Korean Curling Championships team competition.

== History ==
In 2020, a rule change in eligibility allowed men's and women's team players to also compete in the mixed doubles discipline, resulting in a thirty-one team field for the 2021 championship.

== Results ==
Year	Gold	Silver	Bronze	Host
2016	Gyeongbuk; Jang Hye-ji / Lee Ki-jeong	Gyeonggi A Jeong Yu-jin / Hwang Hyeon-jun	Gyeonggi C Seol Ye-ji / Lee Jun-hyung	Uiseong, North Gyeongsang Province
2017	Gyeongbuk; Jang Hye-ji / Lee Ki-jeong	Gangwon; Kim Ji-sun / Lee Ye-jun	Gyeongbuk A Kim Cho-hi / Kim Chi-gu	Icheon, Gyeonggi Province
2017	Gyeongbuk; Jang Hye-ji / Lee Ki-jeong	Gangwon; Kim Ji-sun / Lee Ye-jun	Gyeongbuk D Ahn Jung-yeon / Kim Ho-gan	Icheon, Gyeonggi Province
2018	Gyeonggi A Jang Hye-ri / Choi Chi-won	Gyeonggi C Kim Myung-joo / Kwon Dong-geun	University of Seoul; Lee Ji-young / Kim Min-chan	Jincheon, North Chungcheong Province
2019	Gyeongbuk; Jang Hye-ji / Seong Yu-jin	Gyeonggi A Jang Hye-ri / Choi Chi-won	University of Seoul; Lee Ji-young / Kim Min-chan	Gangneung, Gangwon Province
2020	Gyeongbuk A Jang Hye-ji / Seong Yu-jin	Gyeongbuk B Song Yu-jin / Jeon Jae-ik	Gyeonggi C Kim Ji-yoon / Moon Si-woo	Gangneung, Gangwon Province
2021	Gangwon A Kim Min-ji / Lee Ki-jeong	Seoul Federation; Jang Yeong-seo / Jeong Byeong-jin	Gangwon C Yang Tae-i / Lee Ki-bok	Jincheon, North Chungcheong Province
2022	Seoul A Kim Ji-yoon / Jeong Byeong-jin	Gangwon C Kim Eun-bi / Yoo Min-hyeon	Gangwon A Kim Seon-yeong / Jeong Yeong-seok	Jincheon, North Chungcheong Province
2023	Seoul A Kim Ji-yoon / Jeong Byeong-jin	Gangwon B Kim Hye-rin / Yoo Min-hyeon	Gangwon A Kim Seon-yeong / Jeong Yeong-seok	Uijeongbu, Gyeonggi Province
2024	Gangwon B Kim Kyeong-ae / Seong Ji-hoon	Gangwon A Kim Cho-hi / Lee Ki-bok	Chuncheon; Kim Hye-rin / Yoo Min-hyeon	Jincheon, North Chungcheong Province
2025	Gangwon E Kim Seon-yeong / Jeong Yeong-seok	Gangwon D Kim Hye-rin / Yoo Min-hyeon	Daegu B Lee Hae-in / Kim Hong-geon	Jincheon, North Chungcheong Province
2026	Jeonbuk; Kang Bo-bae / Kim Hak-jun	Gyeongil; Kim Sur-yeong / Kwon Jun-i	Ulsan; Park Ye-rin / Choi Jeong-wook	Uiseong, North Gyeongsang Province
2026	Jeonbuk; Kang Bo-bae / Kim Hak-jun	Gyeongil; Kim Sur-yeong / Kwon Jun-i	Gyeonggi; Won Bo-yeon / Kim Ye-chan	Uiseong, North Gyeongsang Province

== See also ==
- Korean Curling Championships
