= 2020 Korean Curling Championships =

2020 KB Financial Korean Curling Championships
- Host city: Gangneung, South Korea
- Arena: Gangneung Curling Centre
- Dates: November 19–24
- Men's winner: Gyeonggido Curling Federation
- Curling club: Uijeongbu CC, Uijeongbu
- Skip: Jeong Yeong-seok
- Third: Kim San
- Second: Park Se-won
- Lead: Lee Jun-hyung
- Alternate: Kim Seung-min
- Finalist: Gyeongbuk Athletic Association (Kim)
- Women's winner: Gyeongbuk Athletic Association
- Curling club: Uiseong CC, Uiseong
- Skip: Kim Eun-jung
- Third: Kim Kyeong-ae
- Second: Kim Cho-hi
- Lead: Kim Seon-yeong
- Alternate: Kim Yeong-mi
- Coach: Lim Myung-sup
- Finalist: Gyeonggi Province (Gim)

The 2020 Korean Curling Championships (branded as the 2020 KB Financial Korean Curling Championships), Korea's national curling championships, were held from November 19 to 24 at the Gangneung Curling Centre in Gangneung, South Korea. The winning teams on both the men's and women's sides became the Korean National Teams for the 2020–21 curling season. They represented Korea at the 2021 World Men's Curling Championship and the 2021 World Women's Curling Championship. Both the men's and women's events were played in a round robin format which qualified four teams for the playoffs.

The 2020 championship was originally scheduled to be held from May 18 to July 7. The format was to follow the same three round selection process as the 2017 Olympic Trials as the winners were to represent Korea at the 2021 Asian Winter Games before the event got cancelled. Due to the COVID-19 pandemic and positive tests, the championship was pushed back to September 7 to 24. The scheduled was shortened to just one round, with a best-of-five final between the top two teams. However, due to the Korean Curling Federation being disciplined for fraudulent recruitment and improper use of funds, the championship was postponed once again. Following a board meeting, the event was finally decided for November 19 to 24, however, with no crowds due to the pandemic. The event was held in a single round robin with a page playoff to determine the winner.

== Medalists ==
	Gold	Silver	Bronze
Men	Gyeonggido Curling Federation; Jeong Yeong-seok; Kim San; Park Se-won; Lee Jun-hyung; Kim Seung-min	Gyeongbuk Athletic Association; Kim Chang-min; Lee Ki-jeong; Lee Ki-bok; Kim Hak-kyun	Seoul City Hall; Kim Soo-hyuk; Lee Jeong-jae; Jeong Byeong-jin; Kim Tae-hwan
Women	Gyeongbuk Athletic Association; Kim Eun-jung; Kim Kyeong-ae; Kim Cho-hi; Kim Seon-yeong; Kim Yeong-mi	Gyeonggi Province; Gim Un-chi; Seol Ye-ji; Kim Su-ji; Seol Ye-eun	Chuncheon City Hall; Kim Min-ji; Ha Seung-youn; Kim Hye-rin; Kim Su-jin; Yang Tae-i

== Men ==
=== Teams ===
The teams are listed as follows:

Team	Skip	Third	Second	Lead	Alternate	Locale
Gangwon-do Office	Park Jong-duk	Seo Min-guk	Kim Jeong-min	Oh Seung-hoon		Gangwon
Gyeongbuk Athletic Association	Kim Chang-min	Lee Ki-jeong	Lee Ki-bok	Kim Hak-kyun		Uiseong
Gyeonggido Curling Federation	Jeong Yeong-seok	Kim San	Park Se-won	Lee Jun-hyung	Kim Seung-min	Gyeonggi-do
Seoul City Hall	Kim Soo-hyuk	Lee Jeong-jae	Jeong Byeong-jin	Kim Tae-hwan		Seoul
Seoul Physical Education High School	Oh Gyu-nam	Kang Min-jun	Lee Yoon-woo	Park Yeong-ho	Park Jeong-hwan	Seoul
Uijeongbu High School	Yang Woo-jin	Moon Joon-yeong	Ji Seung-ho	Jeong Hyun-wook		Uijeongbu
Uiseong High School	Kim Eun-bin	Pyo Jeong-min	Kim Hyo-jun	Kim Jin-hun	Choi Won-yeong	Uiseong

=== Round robin standings ===
Final Round Robin Standings

Key
Teams to Playoffs

Team	Skip	W	L	W–L	PF	PA	EW	EL	BE	SE	DSC
Gyeongbuk Athletic Association	Kim Chang-min	5	1	–	57	20	28	16	7	10	29.0
Gyeonggido Curling Federation	Jeong Yeong-seok	4	2	1–1	47	36	24	21	1	6	40.6
Seoul City Hall	Kim Soo-hyuk	4	2	1–1	49	31	23	17	4	10	43.3
Uiseong High School	Kim Eun-bin	4	2	1–1	38	35	22	22	2	6	79.2
Gangwon-do Office	Park Jong-duk	3	3	–	34	41	19	24	3	6	40.3
Seoul PE High School	Oh Gyu-nam	1	5	–	31	50	18	26	4	2	55.9
Uijeongbu High School	Yang Woo-jin	0	6	–	22	65	18	26	2	3	103.1

=== Round robin results ===
All draws are listed in Korea Standard Time (UTC+09:00).

==== Draw 2 ====
Thursday, November 19, 20:00

Sheet A	1	2	3	4	5	6	7	8	9	10	Final
Gyeongbuk Athletic Association (C. Kim)	2	0	0	0	1	0	0	0	0	1	4
Gyeonggido Curling Federation (Jeong)	0	1	0	0	0	1	0	1	0	0	3

Sheet C	1	2	3	4	5	6	7	8	9	10	Final
Gangwon-do Office (Park)	1	1	0	4	0	0	2	0	0	X	8
Uijeongbu High School (Yang)	0	0	1	0	1	1	0	1	0	X	4

Sheet D	1	2	3	4	5	6	7	8	9	10	Final
Uiseong High School (E. Kim)	0	0	1	0	0	0	1	0	0	X	2
Seoul City Hall (S. Kim)	0	0	0	2	2	1	0	2	4	X	11

==== Draw 4 ====
Friday, November 20, 12:00

Sheet B	1	2	3	4	5	6	7	8	9	10	Final
Gyeongbuk Athletic Association (C. Kim)	1	3	0	5	1	0	5	X	X	X	15
Uijeongbu High School (Yang)	0	0	2	0	0	1	0	X	X	X	3

Sheet C	1	2	3	4	5	6	7	8	9	10	Final
Gyeonggido Curling Federation (Jeong)	1	0	4	1	0	4	X	X	X	X	10
Seoul City Hall (S. Kim)	0	1	0	0	2	0	X	X	X	X	3

Sheet D	1	2	3	4	5	6	7	8	9	10	Final
Gangwon-do Office (Park)	0	2	0	0	0	3	0	2	X	X	7
Seoul PE High School (Oh)	0	0	1	0	1	0	1	0	X	X	3

==== Draw 6 ====
Friday, November 20, 21:00

Sheet A	1	2	3	4	5	6	7	8	9	10	Final
Gyeonggido Curling Federation (Jeong)	2	0	1	0	4	0	2	0	1	1	11
Gangwon-do Office (Park)	0	2	0	2	0	2	0	2	0	0	8

Sheet B	1	2	3	4	5	6	7	8	9	10	Final
Seoul City Hall (S. Kim)	0	2	0	1	3	0	2	2	X	X	10
Seoul PE High School (Oh)	1	0	1	0	0	1	0	0	X	X	3

Sheet C	1	2	3	4	5	6	7	8	9	10	11	Final
Uiseong High School (E. Kim)	0	0	1	0	1	0	3	0	1	0	1	7
Gyeongbuk Athletic Association (C. Kim)	0	2	0	1	0	1	0	1	0	1	0	6

==== Draw 8 ====
Saturday, November 21, 12:00

Sheet A	1	2	3	4	5	6	7	8	9	10	Final
Uijeongbu High School (Yang)	0	0	1	1	0	1	0	X	X	X	3
Seoul PE High School (Oh)	3	4	0	0	1	0	2	X	X	X	10

Sheet B	1	2	3	4	5	6	7	8	9	10	Final
Gyeonggido Curling Federation (Jeong)	0	0	0	0	2	0	X	X	X	X	2
Uiseong High School (E. Kim)	1	0	2	3	0	2	X	X	X	X	8

Sheet D	1	2	3	4	5	6	7	8	9	10	Final
Gyeongbuk Athletic Association (C. Kim)	0	3	0	4	2	2	X	X	X	X	11
Gangwon-do Office (Park)	0	0	1	0	0	0	X	X	X	X	1

==== Draw 10 ====
Saturday, November 21, 21:00

Sheet B	1	2	3	4	5	6	7	8	9	10	Final
Gangwon-do Office (Park)	0	0	3	1	0	0	0	0	X	X	4
Seoul City Hall (S. Kim)	0	2	0	0	2	1	1	3	X	X	9

Sheet C	1	2	3	4	5	6	7	8	9	10	Final
Uijeongbu High School (Yang)	1	0	0	0	1	0	0	1	0	X	3
Uiseong High School (E. Kim)	0	1	1	0	0	4	1	0	2	X	9

Sheet D	1	2	3	4	5	6	7	8	9	10	Final
Seoul PE High School (Oh)	0	2	0	0	2	0	1	0	0	X	5
Gyeonggido Curling Federation (Jeong)	0	0	3	1	0	2	0	2	3	X	11

==== Draw 12 ====
Sunday, November 22, 12:00

Sheet A	1	2	3	4	5	6	7	8	9	10	Final
Seoul PE High School (Oh)	0	1	0	4	0	0	2	0	0	0	7
Uiseong High School (E. Kim)	1	0	1	0	5	0	0	2	0	0	9

Sheet B	1	2	3	4	5	6	7	8	9	10	Final
Uijeongbu High School (Yang)	0	3	0	1	0	2	0	1	1	0	8
Gyeonggido Curling Federation (Jeong)	2	0	1	0	2	0	4	0	0	1	10

Sheet D	1	2	3	4	5	6	7	8	9	10	Final
Seoul City Hall (S. Kim)	1	0	1	0	0	1	0	0	X	X	3
Gyeongbuk Athletic Association (C. Kim)	0	2	0	4	1	0	1	3	X	X	11

==== Draw 14 ====
Sunday, November 22, 21:00

Sheet A	1	2	3	4	5	6	7	8	9	10	Final
Seoul City Hall (S. Kim)	3	5	5	0	0	0	X	X	X	X	13
Uijeongbu High School (Yang)	0	0	0	0	1	0	X	X	X	X	1

Sheet B	1	2	3	4	5	6	7	8	9	10	Final
Uiseong High School (E. Kim)	0	0	0	0	0	0	2	0	1	X	3
Gangwon-do Office (Park)	1	0	1	0	1	2	0	1	0	X	6

Sheet C	1	2	3	4	5	6	7	8	9	10	Final
Gyeongbuk Athletic Association (C. Kim)	1	0	2	1	1	1	0	0	4	X	10
Seoul PE High School (Oh)	0	1	0	0	0	0	2	0	0	X	3

=== Playoffs ===
Page playoff system
1	Gyeongbuk Athletic Association	12
2	Gyeonggido Curling Federation	5
3	Seoul City Hall	7
4	Uiseong High School	4

Semifinal
2	Gyeonggido Curling Federation	8
3	Seoul City Hall	7

Final
1	Gyeongbuk Athletic Association	10
2	Gyeonggido Curling Federation	12
Third place
3	Seoul City Hall	8
4	Uiseong High School	3

==== 1 vs. 2 ====
Monday, November 23, 12:00

Sheet A	1	2	3	4	5	6	7	8	9	10	Final
Gyeongbuk Athletic Association (C. Kim)	2	0	3	2	0	2	0	3	X	X	12
Gyeonggido Curling Federation (Jeong)	0	2	0	0	2	0	1	0	X	X	5

==== 3 vs. 4 ====
Monday, November 23, 12:00

Sheet C	1	2	3	4	5	6	7	8	9	10	Final
Seoul City Hall (S. Kim)	1	0	0	3	1	0	0	2	0	X	7
Uiseong High School (E. Kim)	0	0	1	0	0	0	1	0	2	X	4

==== Semifinal ====
Monday, November 23, 16:00

Sheet B	1	2	3	4	5	6	7	8	9	10	Final
Gyeonggido Curling Federation (Jeong)	2	0	1	0	2	0	2	0	0	1	8
Seoul City Hall (S. Kim)	0	1	0	1	0	2	0	0	3	0	7

==== Bronze medal game ====
Tuesday, November 24, 12:00

Sheet C	1	2	3	4	5	6	7	8	9	10	Final
Seoul City Hall (S. Kim)	1	1	0	1	2	1	0	2	0	X	8
Uiseong High School (E. Kim)	0	0	1	0	0	0	1	0	1	X	3

==== Gold medal game ====
Tuesday, November 24, 12:00

Sheet D	1	2	3	4	5	6	7	8	9	10	11	Final
Gyeongbuk Athletic Association (C. Kim)	2	0	0	0	3	0	4	0	0	1	0	10
Gyeonggido Curling Federation (Jeong)	0	2	1	2	0	3	0	2	0	0	2	12

2020 Korean Curling Championships
(South Korea)
Jeong Yeong-seok
1st Korean Championship title

=== Final standings ===
Place	Team	Skip
1st place, gold medalist(s)	Gyeonggido Curling Federation	Jeong Yeong-seok
2nd place, silver medalist(s)	Gyeongbuk Athletic Association	Kim Chang-min
3rd place, bronze medalist(s)	Seoul City Hall	Kim Soo-hyuk
4	Uiseong High School	Kim Eun-bin
5	Gangwon-do Office	Park Jong-duk
6	Seoul Physical Education High School	Oh Gyu-nam
7	Uijeongbu High School	Yang Woo-jin

== Women ==
=== Teams ===
The teams are listed as follows:

Team	Skip	Third	Second	Lead	Alternate	Locale
Bongmyeong High School	Kim Min-seo	Kim Su-bin	Shin Yeon-hwa	Lee Seong-rin	Seok Da-eun	Cheongju
Chuncheon City Hall	Kim Min-ji	Ha Seung-youn	Kim Hye-rin	Kim Su-jin	Yang Tae-i	Chuncheon
Gyeongbuk Athletic Association	Kim Eun-jung	Kim Kyeong-ae	Kim Cho-hi	Kim Seon-yeong	Kim Yeong-mi	Uiseong
Gyeonggi Province	Gim Un-chi	Seol Ye-ji	Kim Su-ji	Seol Ye-eun		Uijeongbu
Jeonbuk Province	Um Min-ji	Shin Ga-yeong	Lee Ji-yeong	Jeong Jae-yi	Kim Ji-hyun	Jeonbuk
Songhyun High School B	Kim Ji-su	Jeong Jae-hee	Kang Na-ra	Lee Eun-chae	Park Han-byul	Uijeongbu
Uiseong Girls High School	Lee Eun-chae	Yang Seung-hee	Kang Min-hyo	Jeong Min-jae	Bang Yu-jin	Uiseong

=== Round robin standings ===
Final Round Robin Standings

Key
Teams to Playoffs

Team	Skip	W	L	W–L	PF	PA	EW	EL	BE	SE	DSC
Gyeongbuk Athletic Association	Kim Eun-jung	6	0	–	49	24	26	20	4	8	27.0
Chuncheon City Hall	Kim Min-ji	5	1	–	50	23	29	16	3	13	41.9
Gyeonggi Province	Gim Un-chi	4	2	–	52	26	27	19	3	9	47.4
Jeonbuk Province	Um Min-ji	3	3	–	37	37	25	21	3	7	36.0
Uiseong Girls High School	Lee Eun-chae	2	4	–	25	51	17	27	5	4	83.3
Songhyun High School B	Kim Ji-su	1	5	–	41	44	24	25	3	5	54.5
Bongmyeong High School	Kim Min-seo	0	6	–	12	61	10	30	1	0	105.5

=== Round robin results ===
All draws are listed in Korea Standard Time (UTC+09:00).

==== Draw 1 ====
Thursday, November 19, 15:00

Sheet A	1	2	3	4	5	6	7	8	9	10	Final
Chuncheon City Hall (M. J. Kim)	2	0	3	2	3	0	2	X	X	X	12
Uiseong Girls High School (Lee)	0	0	0	0	0	1	0	X	X	X	1

Sheet B	1	2	3	4	5	6	7	8	9	10	Final
Jeonbuk Province (Um)	0	2	0	0	0	1	0	1	0	X	4
Gyeonggi Province (Gim)	0	0	2	1	0	0	3	0	2	X	8

Sheet D	1	2	3	4	5	6	7	8	9	10	Final
Bongmyeong High School (M. S. Kim)	0	0	1	0	1	0	0	0	X	X	2
Songhyun High School B (J. Kim)	1	3	0	2	0	0	3	4	X	X	13

==== Draw 3 ====
Friday, November 20, 7:30

Sheet A	1	2	3	4	5	6	7	8	9	10	Final
Songhyun High School B (J. Kim)	0	1	1	0	1	0	3	0	1	0	7
Gyeonggi Province (Gim)	2	0	0	2	0	1	0	3	0	1	9

Sheet B	1	2	3	4	5	6	7	8	9	10	Final
Chuncheon City Hall (M. J. Kim)	1	0	0	1	0	0	1	0	0	X	3
Gyeongbuk Athletic Association (E. Kim)	0	2	1	0	1	0	0	1	2	X	7

Sheet C	1	2	3	4	5	6	7	8	9	10	Final
Bongmyeong High School (M. S. Kim)	0	1	0	2	0	0	0	1	0	X	4
Uiseong Girls High School (Lee)	2	0	2	0	2	1	0	0	1	X	8

==== Draw 5 ====
Friday, November 20, 16:30

Sheet A	1	2	3	4	5	6	7	8	9	10	Final
Jeonbuk Province (Um)	2	1	0	1	3	0	4	X	X	X	11
Bongmyeong High School (M. S. Kim)	0	0	1	0	0	1	0	X	X	X	2

Sheet C	1	2	3	4	5	6	7	8	9	10	Final
Gyeonggi Province (Gim)	1	0	0	1	0	0	2	0	0	1	5
Gyeongbuk Athletic Association (E. Kim)	0	1	0	0	3	1	0	0	2	0	7

Sheet D	1	2	3	4	5	6	7	8	9	10	Final
Songhyun High School B (J. Kim)	0	1	0	1	0	3	0	0	1	X	6
Chuncheon City Hall (M. J. Kim)	2	0	1	0	1	0	3	3	0	X	10

==== Draw 7 ====
Saturday, November 21, 7:30

Sheet B	1	2	3	4	5	6	7	8	9	10	Final
Bongmyeong High School (M. S. Kim)	0	0	0	1	0	0	X	X	X	X	1
Chuncheon City Hall (M. J. Kim)	1	1	1	0	3	3	X	X	X	X	9

Sheet C	1	2	3	4	5	6	7	8	9	10	11	Final
Songhyun High School B (J. Kim)	0	0	2	0	0	0	0	1	0	2	0	5
Jeonbuk Province (Um)	1	0	0	2	0	1	1	0	0	0	1	6

Sheet D	1	2	3	4	5	6	7	8	9	10	Final
Uiseong Girls High School (Lee)	1	0	0	0	1	0	1	1	0	X	4
Gyeongbuk Athletic Association (E. Kim)	0	0	1	0	0	3	0	0	3	X	7

==== Draw 9 ====
Saturday, November 21, 16:30

Sheet A	1	2	3	4	5	6	7	8	9	10	Final
Uiseong Girls High School (Lee)	0	0	0	0	0	2	0	2	0	X	4
Jeonbuk Province (Um)	2	0	1	1	1	0	1	0	2	X	8

Sheet B	1	2	3	4	5	6	7	8	9	10	Final
Gyeongbuk Athletic Association (E. Kim)	0	0	3	1	0	3	0	3	X	X	10
Songhyun High School B (J. Kim)	0	2	0	0	1	0	1	0	X	X	4

Sheet C	1	2	3	4	5	6	7	8	9	10	Final
Chuncheon City Hall (M. J. Kim)	0	1	0	1	1	1	0	1	0	2	7
Gyeonggi Province (Gim)	0	0	2	0	0	0	1	0	2	0	5

==== Draw 11 ====
Sunday, November 22, 7:30

Sheet B	1	2	3	4	5	6	7	8	9	10	Final
Gyeonggi Province (Gim)	0	0	2	2	2	1	4	X	X	X	11
Bongmyeong High School (M. S. Kim)	0	0	0	0	0	0	0	X	X	X	0

Sheet C	1	2	3	4	5	6	7	8	9	10	Final
Uiseong Girls High School (Lee)	0	2	1	0	0	3	0	1	0	0	7
Songhyun High School B (J. Kim)	1	0	0	1	0	0	1	0	3	0	6

Sheet D	1	2	3	4	5	6	7	8	9	10	Final
Gyeongbuk Athletic Association (E. Kim)	0	3	0	2	0	1	0	1	2	X	9
Jeonbuk Province (Um)	1	0	2	0	1	0	1	0	0	X	5

==== Draw 13 ====
Sunday, November 22, 16:30

Sheet A	1	2	3	4	5	6	7	8	9	10	Final
Bongmyeong High School (M. S. Kim)	0	1	0	0	0	0	0	2	X	X	3
Gyeongbuk Athletic Association (E. Kim)	2	0	0	2	2	2	1	0	X	X	9

Sheet C	1	2	3	4	5	6	7	8	9	10	Final
Jeonbuk Province (Um)	0	0	1	0	0	0	2	0	X	X	3
Chuncheon City Hall (M. J. Kim)	0	2	0	1	2	1	0	3	X	X	9

Sheet D	1	2	3	4	5	6	7	8	9	10	Final
Gyeonggi Province (Gim)	2	1	3	1	0	4	3	X	X	X	14
Uiseong Girls High School (Lee)	0	0	0	0	1	0	0	X	X	X	1

=== Playoffs ===
Page playoff system
1	Gyeongbuk Athletic Association	6
2	Chuncheon City Hall	5
3	Gyeonggi Province	8
4	Jeonbuk Province	6

Semifinal
2	Chuncheon City Hall	4
3	Gyeonggi Province	9

Final
1	Gyeongbuk Athletic Association	7
3	Gyeonggi Province	5
Third place
2	Chuncheon City Hall	8
4	Jeonbuk Province	4

==== 1 vs. 2 ====
Monday, November 23, 12:00

Sheet B	1	2	3	4	5	6	7	8	9	10	Final
Gyeongbuk Athletic Association (E. Kim)	0	1	1	0	0	1	0	2	0	1	6
Chuncheon City Hall (M. J. Kim)	0	0	0	1	0	0	1	0	3	0	5

==== 3 vs. 4 ====
Monday, November 23, 12:00

Sheet D	1	2	3	4	5	6	7	8	9	10	11	Final
Gyeonggi Province (Gim)	1	0	1	2	0	0	0	0	2	0	2	8
Jeonbuk Province (Um)	0	1	0	0	1	1	0	1	0	2	0	6

==== Semifinal ====
Monday, November 23, 16:00

Sheet C	1	2	3	4	5	6	7	8	9	10	Final
Chuncheon City Hall (M. J. Kim)	0	0	1	0	1	0	0	2	0	X	4
Gyeonggi Province (Gim)	0	2	0	1	0	2	3	0	1	X	9

==== Bronze medal game ====
Tuesday, November 24, 12:00

Sheet B	1	2	3	4	5	6	7	8	9	10	Final
Chuncheon City Hall (M. J. Kim)	2	0	0	0	2	1	0	2	1	X	8
Jeonbuk Province (Um)	0	0	2	1	0	0	1	0	0	X	4

==== Gold medal game ====
Tuesday, November 24, 12:00

Sheet A	1	2	3	4	5	6	7	8	9	10	Final
Gyeongbuk Athletic Association (E. Kim)	0	1	3	0	0	1	0	0	1	1	7
Gyeonggi Province (Gim)	0	0	0	1	1	0	1	2	0	0	5

2020 Korean Curling Championships
(South Korea)
Kim Eun-jung
5th Korean Championship title

=== Final standings ===
Place	Team	Skip
1st place, gold medalist(s)	Gyeongbuk Athletic Association	Kim Eun-jung
2nd place, silver medalist(s)	Gyeonggi Province	Gim Un-chi
3rd place, bronze medalist(s)	Chuncheon City Hall	Kim Min-ji
4	Jeonbuk Province	Um Min-ji
5	Uiseong Girls High School	Lee Eun-chae
6	Songhyun High School B	Kim Ji-su
7	Bongmyeong High School	Kim Min-seo
