= 2022 Korean Mixed Doubles Curling Championship =

2022 KB Financial Korean Mixed Doubles Curling Championship
- Host city: Jincheon, South Korea
- Arena: Jincheon National Training Centre
- Dates: July 12–15
- Winner: Seoul Curling Federation A
- Female: Kim Ji-yoon
- Male: Jeong Byeong-jin
- Finalist: Gangwon C (Kim E. / Yoo)

The 2022 Korean Mixed Doubles Curling Championship (branded as the 2022 KB Financial Korean Mixed Doubles Curling Championship), Korea's national mixed doubles curling championship, was held from July 12 to 15 at the Jincheon National Training Centre in Jincheon, South Korea. The winning pair of Kim Ji-yoon and Jeong Byeong-jin became the Korean National Team for the 2022–23 curling season. They represented Korea on home soil at the 2023 World Mixed Doubles Curling Championship where they finished in sixteenth with a 3–7 record. Through regional qualifiers, the field was narrowed down from over thirty teams to just fifteen who competed in the national championship. The preliminary round was held in a round robin format which qualified the top team in each of the four pools for the playoff round.

Among the field of fifteen pairs were two members of the Kim Eun-jung rink that won silver at the 2018 Winter Olympics in PyeongChang, Kim Seon-yeong and Kim Cho-hi. They were joined by their partners Jeong Yeong-seok and Oh Seung-hoon, respectively, representing the Gangwon region. Other notable pairs were Jeonbuk's Um Min-ji and Nam Yoon-ho, who were one of the only duos to return from 2021, as well as Kim Ji-yoon and Jeong Byeong-jin. Kim competed in the 2021 World Mixed Doubles Curling Championship with partner Moon Si-woo while Jeong had just won the 2022 Korean Curling Championships the previous month. The defending champions, Kim Min-ji and Lee Ki-jeong did not participate due to Lee serving military duties.

== Medalists ==
Medal	Gold	Silver	Bronze
Team	Seoul A Kim Ji-yoon; Jeong Byeong-jin	Gangwon C Kim Eun-bi; Yoo Min-hyeon	Gangwon A Kim Seon-yeong; Jeong Yeong-seok

== Qualification process ==
Regional Qualifiers	Vacancies	Qualified
Gangwon Qualifier	3	Kim Seon-yeong / Jeong Yeong-seok; Kim Cho-hi / Oh Seung-hoon; Kim Eun-bi / Yoo Min-hyeon
Gyeonggi Qualifier	3	Lee Eun-chae / Kwon Dong-geun; Park Han-byul / Yang Woo-jin; Park Jeong-hwa / Choi Chi-won
Gyeongbuk Qualifier	2	Bang Yu-jin / Kim Dae-hyeon; Jeong Min-jae / Kim Jin-hun
Jeonbuk Qualifier	2	Um Min-ji / Nam Yoon-ho; Shin Ga-yeong / Kim Dae-seok
Seoul Region	2	Kim Ji-yoon / Jeong Byeong-jin; Park You-been / Lee Jeong-jae
Cheongju Qualifier	2	Kim Min-seo / Moon Hyeon; Shim Yoo-jeong / Lim Byeong-hyeon
Daejeon Region	1	Kim Yuna / Park Jin-woong
Incheon Region	~~1~~	~~Lee Hye-soo / Kim Byeong-chan~~ (Note: Lee Hye-soo and Kim Byeong-chan dropped out, dropping the field from sixteen to fifteen teams.)
TOTAL	15	

== Teams ==
The teams are listed as follows:

Team	Female	Male	Region
Bongmyeong High School A	Kim Min-seo	Moon Hyeon	Cheongju
Bongmyeong High School B	Shim Yoo-jeong	Lim Byeong-hyeon	Cheongju
Daejeon Curling Federation	Kim Yuna	Park Jin-woong	Daejeon
Gangwon A	Kim Seon-yeong	Jeong Yeong-seok	Gangwon
Gangwon B	Kim Cho-hi	Oh Seung-hoon	Gangwon
Gangwon C	Kim Eun-bi	Yoo Min-hyeon	Gangwon
Gyeonggido Curling Federation A	Lee Eun-chae	Kwon Dong-geun	Gyeonggi
Gyeonggido Curling Federation B	Park Han-byul	Yang Woo-jin	Gyeonggi
Gyeonggido Curling Federation C	Park Jeong-hwa	Choi Chi-won	Gyeonggi
Jeonbuk Province A	Um Min-ji	Nam Yoon-ho	Jeonbuk
Jeonbuk Province B	Shin Ga-yeong	Kim Dae-seok	Jeonbuk
Kyungil University	Jeong Min-jae	Kim Jin-hun	Gyeongbuk
Seoul Curling Federation A	Kim Ji-yoon	Jeong Byeong-jin	Seoul
Seoul Curling Federation B	Park You-been	Lee Jeong-jae	Seoul
Uiseong Curling Federation	Bang Yu-jin	Kim Dae-hyeon	Gyeongbuk

== Round-robin standings ==
Final round-robin standings

Key
Teams to Playoffs

Pool A	W	L	W–L	PF	PA	EW	EL	SE	DSC
Kim Seon-yeong / Jeong Yeong-seok	2	1	1–0	18	18	13	10	3	49.80
Um Min-ji / Nam Yoon-ho	2	1	0–1	17	16	13	10	6	30.10
Park Jeong-hwa / Choi Chi-won	1	2	1–0	14	15	9	12	4	25.00
Park You-been / Lee Jeong-jae	1	2	0–1	20	20	10	13	3	40.00

Pool C	W	L	W–L	PF	PA	EW	EL	SE	DSC
Kim Eun-bi / Yoo Min-hyeon	3	0	–	24	17	13	10	5	86.70
Jeong Min-jae / Kim Jin-hun	2	1	–	21	13	11	11	4	26.40
Park Han-byul / Yang Woo-jin	1	2	–	12	20	10	12	5	44.90
Shim Yoo-jeong / Lim Byeong-hyeon	0	3	–	19	26	11	12	4	71.30

Pool B	W	L	W–L	PF	PA	EW	EL	SE	DSC
Kim Cho-hi / Oh Seung-hoon	3	0	–	29	11	13	7	6	28.00
Lee Eun-chae / Kwon Dong-geun	2	1	–	23	19	13	9	7	46.60
Kim Yuna / Park Jin-woong	1	2	–	10	25	8	13	4	98.70
Kim Min-seo / Moon Hyeon	0	3	–	15	22	9	14	5	121.70

Pool D	W	L	W–L	PF	PA	EW	EL	SE	DSC
Kim Ji-yoon / Jeong Byeong-jin	2	0	–	21	6	11	3	6	21.60
Shin Ga-yeong / Kim Dae-seok	1	1	–	14	15	6	11	0	46.30
Bang Yu-jin / Kim Dae-hyeon	0	2	–	7	21	6	9	4	31.50

== Round-robin results ==
All draws are listed in Korea Standard Time (UTC+09:00).

=== Draw 1 ===
Tuesday, July 12, 9:00

Sheet A	1	2	3	4	5	6	7	8	Final
Park Jeong-hwa / Choi Chi-won 🔨	0	1	1	0	0	4	1	X	7
Park You-been / Lee Jeong-jae	1	0	0	2	1	0	0	X	4

Sheet B	1	2	3	4	5	6	7	8	Final
Kim Seon-yeong / Jeong Yeong-seok	1	0	2	1	0	1	0	1	6
Um Min-ji / Nam Yoon-ho 🔨	0	2	0	0	1	0	2	0	5

Sheet C	1	2	3	4	5	6	7	8	Final
Lee Eun-chae / Kwon Dong-geun 🔨	0	1	2	1	2	2	0	1	9
Kim Min-seo / Moon Hyeon	2	0	0	0	0	0	3	0	5

Sheet D	1	2	3	4	5	6	7	8	Final
Kim Cho-hi / Oh Seung-hoon 🔨	3	3	1	0	2	2	X	X	11
Kim Yuna / Park Jin-woong	0	0	0	1	0	0	X	X	1

=== Draw 2 ===
Tuesday, July 12, 13:00

Sheet A	1	2	3	4	5	6	7	8	Final
Park Han-byul / Yang Woo-jin 🔨	1	1	1	2	0	0	1	0	6
Shim Yoo-jeong / Lim Byeong-hyeon	0	0	0	0	1	2	0	2	5

Sheet B	1	2	3	4	5	6	7	8	Final
Jeong Min-jae / Kim Jin-hun 🔨	1	0	0	0	2	0	1	0	4
Kim Eun-bi / Yoo Min-hyeon	0	1	1	1	0	2	0	1	6

Sheet D	1	2	3	4	5	6	7	8	Final
Kim Ji-yoon / Jeong Byeong-jin 🔨	1	3	2	3	2	2	X	X	13
Bang Yu-jin / Kim Dae-hyeon	0	0	0	0	0	0	X	X	0

=== Draw 3 ===
Tuesday, July 12, 17:00

Sheet A	1	2	3	4	5	6	7	8	Final
Lee Eun-chae / Kwon Dong-geun	0	0	1	0	0	3	0	X	4
Kim Cho-hi / Oh Seung-hoon 🔨	2	1	0	2	1	0	4	X	10

Sheet B	1	2	3	4	5	6	7	8	Final
Kim Min-seo / Moon Hyeon	1	0	0	0	0	1	2	0	4
Kim Yuna / Park Jin-woong 🔨	0	1	1	1	1	0	0	1	5

Sheet C	1	2	3	4	5	6	7	8	Final
Park Jeong-hwa / Choi Chi-won	1	0	2	0	1	0	0	X	4
Kim Seon-yeong / Jeong Yeong-seok 🔨	0	3	0	1	0	1	1	X	6

Sheet D	1	2	3	4	5	6	7	8	9	Final
Park You-been / Lee Jeong-jae	2	0	0	0	1	0	4	0	/	L^
Um Min-ji / Nam Yoon-ho 🔨	0	1	2	1	0	1	0	2		W

^ Park You-been / Lee Jeong-jae ran out of time, and therefore forfeited the match.

=== Draw 4 ===
Wednesday, July 13, 9:00

Sheet A	1	2	3	4	5	6	7	8	9	Final
Bang Yu-jin / Kim Dae-hyeon	0	1	1	1	0	1	1	2	0	7
Shin Ga-yeong / Kim Dae-seok 🔨	5	0	0	0	2	0	0	0	1	8

Sheet C	1	2	3	4	5	6	7	8	Final
Park Han-byul / Yang Woo-jin	1	0	1	0	0	0	0	X	2
Jeong Min-jae / Kim Jin-hun 🔨	0	2	0	3	1	1	1	X	8

Sheet D	1	2	3	4	5	6	7	8	Final
Shim Yoo-jeong / Lim Byeong-hyeon	0	3	0	2	0	3	1	0	9
Kim Eun-bi / Yoo Min-hyeon 🔨	3	0	3	0	3	0	0	2	11

=== Draw 5 ===
Wednesday, July 13, 13:00

Sheet A	1	2	3	4	5	6	7	8	Final
Park Jeong-hwa / Choi Chi-won 🔨	0	0	0	0	2	1	0	X	3
Um Min-ji / Nam Yoon-ho	1	1	1	1	0	0	1	X	5

Sheet B	1	2	3	4	5	6	7	8	Final
Park You-been / Lee Jeong-jae 🔨	2	0	2	0	2	0	3	0	9
Kim Seon-yeong / Jeong Yeong-seok	0	2	0	1	0	2	0	1	6

Sheet C	1	2	3	4	5	6	7	8	Final
Lee Eun-chae / Kwon Dong-geun 🔨	0	2	1	1	1	0	5	X	10
Kim Yuna / Park Jin-woong	1	0	0	0	0	3	0	X	4

Sheet D	1	2	3	4	5	6	7	8	Final
Kim Min-seo / Moon Hyeon	1	0	0	2	1	0	2	X	6
Kim Cho-hi / Oh Seung-hoon 🔨	0	3	3	0	0	2	0	X	8

=== Draw 6 ===
Wednesday, July 13, 17:00

Sheet A	1	2	3	4	5	6	7	8	Final
Park Han-byul / Yang Woo-jin 🔨	0	0	0	2	1	0	1	X	4
Kim Eun-bi / Yoo Min-hyeon	3	2	1	0	0	1	0	X	7

Sheet B	1	2	3	4	5	6	7	8	Final
Shim Yoo-jeong / Lim Byeong-hyeon	2	1	0	0	1	0	1	X	5
Jeong Min-jae / Kim Jin-hun 🔨	0	0	3	2	0	4	0	X	9

Sheet C	1	2	3	4	5	6	7	8	Final
Kim Ji-yoon / Jeong Byeong-jin 🔨	2	2	0	2	0	1	0	1	8
Shin Ga-yeong / Kim Dae-seok	0	0	2	0	1	0	3	0	6

== Playoffs ==
Semifinals
1	Kim Ji-yoon / Jeong Byeong-jin	8
4	Kim Cho-hi / Oh Seung-hoon	5
2	Kim Eun-bi / Yoo Min-hyeon	8
3	Kim Seon-yeong / Jeong Yeong-seok	4

Final
1	Kim Ji-yoon / Jeong Byeong-jin	7
2	Kim Eun-bi / Yoo Min-hyeon	5
Bronze place game
4	Kim Cho-hi / Oh Seung-hoon	6
3	Kim Seon-yeong / Jeong Yeong-seok	7

=== Semifinals ===
Thursday, July 14, 13:00

Sheet B	1	2	3	4	5	6	7	8	Final
Kim Ji-yoon / Jeong Byeong-jin 🔨	0	0	0	1	3	0	3	1	8
Kim Cho-hi / Oh Seung-hoon	1	1	1	0	0	2	0	0	5

Sheet C	1	2	3	4	5	6	7	8	Final
Kim Eun-bi / Yoo Min-hyeon	1	1	0	1	3	0	2	X	8
Kim Seon-yeong / Jeong Yeong-seok 🔨	0	0	1	0	0	3	0	X	4

=== Bronze medal game ===
Thursday, July 14, 17:00

Sheet B	1	2	3	4	5	6	7	8	Final
Kim Cho-hi / Oh Seung-hoon	0	1	0	1	0	1	0	3	6
Kim Seon-yeong / Jeong Yeong-seok 🔨	1	0	3	0	1	0	2	0	7

=== Final ===
Friday, July 15, 10:00

Sheet D	1	2	3	4	5	6	7	8	Final
Kim Ji-yoon / Jeong Byeong-jin	0	3	0	1	0	3	0	X	7
Kim Eun-bi / Yoo Min-hyeon 🔨	2	0	1	0	1	0	1	X	5

== Final standings ==
Place	Team
1st place, gold medalist(s)	Kim Ji-yoon / Jeong Byeong-jin
2nd place, silver medalist(s)	Kim Eun-bi / Yoo Min-hyeon
3rd place, bronze medalist(s)	Kim Seon-yeong / Jeong Yeong-seok
4	Kim Cho-hi / Oh Seung-hoon
5	Jeong Min-jae / Kim Jin-hun
6	Um Min-ji / Nam Yoon-ho
7	Lee Eun-chae / Kwon Dong-geun
8	Shin Ga-yeong / Kim Dae-seok
9	Park Jeong-hwa / Choi Chi-won
10	Park You-been / Lee Jeong-jae
11	Park Han-byul / Yang Woo-jin
12	Kim Yuna / Park Jin-woong
13	Bang Yu-jin / Kim Dae-hyeon
14	Shim Yoo-jeong / Lim Byeong-hyeon
15	Kim Min-seo / Moon Hyeon

== See also ==
- 2022 Korean Curling Championships
