= 2023 Korean Mixed Doubles Curling Championship =

- Host city: Uijeongbu, South Korea
- Arena: Uijeongbu Curling Stadium
- Dates: July 23–31
- Winner: Seoul A
- Female: Kim Ji-yoon
- Male: Jeong Byeong-jin
- Finalist: Gangwon B (H. Kim / Yoo)

The 2023 Korean Mixed Doubles Curling Championship, Korea's national mixed doubles curling championship, was held from July 23 to 31 at the Uijeongbu Curling Stadium in Uijeongbu, South Korea. The winning pair of Kim Ji-yoon and Jeong Byeong-jin became the Korean National Team for the 2023–24 curling season. They represented Korea at the 2024 World Mixed Doubles Curling Championship in Östersund, Sweden. Through regional qualifiers, the field was narrowed down from over forty teams to just eighteen who competed in the national championship. The preliminary round was held in a round robin format which qualified the top three teams in each pool for the playoff round.

Among the field of eighteen pairs were newly crowned champions in the men's and women's events, Jeong Yeong-seok and Kim Su-ji. Jeong, third on Park Jong-duk's Gangwon Province team paired up with Gangneung City Hall's Kim Seon-yeong for a second year in a row while Kim, second on Gim Eun-ji's Gyeonggi Province rink joined forces with Kim Jeong-min. Other notable pairs included defending champions Kim Ji-yoon and Jeong Byeong-jin of Seoul, who went 3–7 at the 2023 World Mixed Doubles Curling Championship in Gangneung. Chuncheon City Hall's Kim Hye-rin paired with Yoo Min-hyeon, while Park You-been and Lee Jeong-jae formed another team out of Seoul.

== Medalists ==
	Gold	Silver	Bronze
Team	Seoul A Kim Ji-yoon; Jeong Byeong-jin	Gangwon B Kim Hye-rin; Yoo Min-hyeon	Gangwon A Kim Seon-yeong; Jeong Yeong-seok

== Qualification process ==
Regional Qualifiers	Vacancies	Qualified
Cheongju Qualifier	2	Shim Yoo-jeong / Lim Byeong-hyeon; Jeong An-ah / Kwon Oh-woo
Gyeonggi Qualifier	2	Kim Su-ji / Kim Jeong-min; Kang Bo-bae / Kim Hong-geon
Gyeongbuk Qualifier	3	Kang Min-hyo / Lee Jae-beom; Jeong Min-jae / Kim Hyo-jun; Bang Yu-jin / Pyo Jeong-min
Gangwon Qualifier	3	Kim Seon-yeong / Jeong Yeong-seok; Kim Hye-rin / Yoo Min-hyeon; Lee Bo-yeong / Park Jin-hwan
Busan Region	1	Lim Ye-jin / Lee Dong-in
Seoul Region	4	Kim Ji-yoon / Jeong Byeong-jin; Lee Eun-chae / Kim Min-woo; Yang Seung-hee / Kim Tae-hwan; Park You-been / Lee Jeong-jae
Jeonbuk Qualifier	2	Kim Ji-soo / Kim Dae-seok; Jeong Jae-hee / Chae Byeong-ho
Daejeon Region	1	Lee Eun-chae / Park Jin-woong
TOTAL	18	

== Teams ==
The teams are listed as follows:

Team	Female	Male	Region
Bongmyeong A	Shim Yoo-jeong	Lim Byeong-hyeon	Cheongju
Bongmyeong B	Jeong An-ah	Kwon Oh-woo	Cheongju
Busan	Lim Ye-jin	Lee Dong-in	Busan
Daejeon	Lee Eun-chae	Park Jin-woong	Daejeon
Gangwon A	Kim Seon-yeong	Jeong Yeong-seok	Gangwon
Gangwon B	Kim Hye-rin	Yoo Min-hyeon	Gangwon
Gangwon C	Lee Bo-yeong	Park Jin-hwan	Gangwon
Gyeongbuk A	Kang Min-hyo	Lee Jae-beom	Gyeongbuk
Gyeongbuk B	Jeong Min-jae	Kim Hyo-jun	Gyeongbuk
Gyeongbuk C	Bang Yu-jin	Pyo Jeong-min	Gyeongbuk
Gyeonggi A	Kim Su-ji	Kim Jeong-min	Gyeonggi
Gyeonggi B	Kang Bo-bae	Kim Hong-geon	Gyeonggi
Jeonbuk A	Kim Ji-soo	Kim Dae-seok	Jeonbuk
Jeonbuk B	Jeong Jae-hee	Chae Byeong-ho	Jeonbuk
Seoul A	Kim Ji-yoon	Jeong Byeong-jin	Seoul
Seoul B	Lee Eun-chae	Kim Min-woo	Seoul
Seoul C	Yang Seung-hee	Kim Tae-hwan	Seoul
Seoul D	Park You-been	Lee Jeong-jae	Seoul

== Round robin standings ==
Final Round Robin Standings

Key
Teams to Playoffs

Pool A	Athletes	W	L	W–L	PF	PA	EW	EL	BE	SE	DSC
Seoul A	Kim Ji-yoon / Jeong Byeong-jin	6	2	1–0	67	44	32	26	0	10	42.9
Gyeongbuk C	Bang Yu-jin / Pyo Jeong-min	6	2	0–1	58	48	33	27	0	10	58.1
Seoul B	Lee Eun-chae / Kim Min-woo	5	3	1–0	55	42	32	28	0	11	45.9
Gyeongbuk B	Jeong Min-jae / Kim Hyo-jun	5	3	0–1	62	46	31	27	0	11	65.1
Bongmyeong A	Shim Yoo-jeong / Lim Byeong-hyeon	4	4	–	61	45	31	27	0	12	84.8
Jeonbuk A	Kim Ji-soo / Kim Dae-seok	3	5	2–0	50	56	30	29	0	11	56.8
Gyeonggi B	Kang Bo-bae / Kim Hong-geon	3	5	1–1	56	56	30	32	0	11	65.1
Gangwon C	Lee Bo-yeong / Park Jin-hwan	3	5	0–2	45	59	29	28	1	10	52.6
Busan	Lim Ye-jin / Lee Dong-in	1	7	–	21	79	14	38	0	4	133.4

Pool B	Athletes	W	L	W–L	PF	PA	EW	EL	BE	SE	DSC
Gangwon B	Kim Hye-rin / Yoo Min-hyeon	8	0	–	79	37	35	22	0	17	48.5
Seoul D	Park You-been / Lee Jeong-jae	6	2	1–0	58	44	32	27	0	9	28.2
Gangwon A	Kim Seon-yeong / Jeong Yeong-seok	6	2	0–1	63	43	29	28	0	7	33.7
Gyeongbuk A	Kang Min-hyo / Lee Jae-beom	5	3	–	62	36	37	20	0	21	40.9
Gyeonggi A	Kim Su-ji / Kim Jeong-min	4	4	–	51	47	32	29	0	6	30.9
Seoul C	Yang Seung-hee / Kim Tae-hwan	3	5	1–0	59	51	29	29	0	10	32.3
Daejeon	Lee Eun-chae / Park Jin-woong	3	5	0–1	42	69	24	33	0	5	75.7
Bongmyeong B	Jeong An-ah / Kwon Oh-woo	1	7	–	27	80	17	38	1	4	77.0
Jeonbuk B	Jeong Jae-hee / Chae Byeong-ho	0	8	–	39	74	25	34	0	8	65.2

== Round robin results ==
All draws are listed in Korea Standard Time (UTC+09:00).

=== Draw 1 ===
Sunday, July 23, 16:00

Sheet A	1	2	3	4	5	6	7	8	Final
Gyeongbuk B (Jeong / Kim) 🔨	4	1	3	0	4	0	4	X	16
Busan (Lim / Lee)	0	0	0	2	0	3	0	X	5

Sheet B	1	2	3	4	5	6	7	8	Final
Jeonbuk A (J. Kim / D. Kim) 🔨	0	0	2	0	2	0	2	X	6
Seoul A (J. Kim / B. Jeong)	3	2	0	2	0	2	0	X	9

Sheet C	1	2	3	4	5	6	7	8	Final
Bongmyeong A (Shim / Lim)	0	2	0	3	2	0	0	X	7
Gyeonggi B (Kang / Kim) 🔨	1	0	4	0	0	4	2	X	11

Sheet D	1	2	3	4	5	6	7	8	Final
Gangwon C (B. Lee / J. Park)	0	2	1	0	2	1	0	0	6
Seoul B (Lee / Kim) 🔨	3	0	0	2	0	0	3	2	10

=== Draw 2 ===
Sunday, July 23, 20:00

Sheet A	1	2	3	4	5	6	7	8	Final
Gangwon A (S. Kim / Y. Jeong) 🔨	0	0	2	0	3	0	0	2	7
Gyeongbuk A (Kang / Lee)	1	1	0	1	0	1	1	0	5

Sheet B	1	2	3	4	5	6	7	8	Final
Jeonbuk B (Jeong / Chae)	1	0	2	2	0	0	1	0	6
Gyeonggi A (S. Kim / J. Kim) 🔨	0	1	0	0	2	2	0	3	8

Sheet C	1	2	3	4	5	6	7	8	Final
Daejeon (E. Lee / J. Park) 🔨	0	0	0	1	0	0	0	X	1
Gangwon B (Kim / Yoo)	2	1	1	0	3	3	2	X	12

Sheet D	1	2	3	4	5	6	7	8	Final
Bongmyeong B (Jeong / Kwon)	0	2	0	0	0	0	0	X	2
Seoul C (Yang / Kim) 🔨	1	0	5	1	3	1	3	X	14

=== Draw 3 ===
Monday, July 24, 8:00

Sheet A	1	2	3	4	5	6	7	8	Final
Jeonbuk A (J. Kim / D. Kim) 🔨	2	0	0	0	0	0	1	X	3
Seoul B (Lee / Kim)	0	1	1	2	1	2	0	X	7

Sheet B	1	2	3	4	5	6	7	8	Final
Gyeongbuk C (Bang / Pyo) 🔨	2	0	1	0	2	2	0	1	8
Bongmyeong A (Shim / Lim)	0	2	0	2	0	0	2	0	6

Sheet D	1	2	3	4	5	6	7	8	Final
Gyeonggi B (Kang / Kim) 🔨	0	0	1	1	1	1	0	0	4
Busan (Lim / Lee)	1	1	0	0	0	0	2	1	5

Sheet E	1	2	3	4	5	6	7	8	Final
Gyeongbuk B (Jeong / Kim) 🔨	0	4	0	2	0	2	0	1	9
Seoul A (J. Kim / B. Jeong)	2	0	1	0	1	0	2	0	6

=== Draw 4 ===
Monday, July 24, 12:00

Sheet A	1	2	3	4	5	6	7	8	Final
Jeonbuk B (Jeong / Chae)	0	0	0	2	0	2	0	X	4
Seoul C (Yang / Kim) 🔨	1	4	1	0	3	0	3	X	12

Sheet B	1	2	3	4	5	6	7	8	Final
Seoul D (Park / Lee) 🔨	0	1	2	0	3	0	4	X	10
Daejeon (E. Lee / J. Park)	1	0	0	1	0	1	0	X	3

Sheet D	1	2	3	4	5	6	7	8	Final
Gangwon B (Kim / Yoo)	0	3	0	0	4	2	1	X	10
Gyeongbuk A (Kang / Lee) 🔨	2	0	1	2	0	0	0	X	5

Sheet E	1	2	3	4	5	6	7	8	Final
Gangwon A (S. Kim / Y. Jeong) 🔨	2	0	1	0	0	3	1	0	7
Gyeonggi A (S. Kim / J. Kim)	0	1	0	1	1	0	0	1	4

=== Draw 5 ===
Monday, July 24, 16:00

Sheet B	1	2	3	4	5	6	7	8	Final
Seoul B (Lee / Kim) 🔨	1	0	1	1	0	0	2	/	L^
Gyeonggi B (Kang / Kim)	0	2	0	0	1	1	0		W

Sheet C	1	2	3	4	5	6	7	8	Final
Seoul A (J. Kim / B. Jeong) 🔨	0	1	0	0	4	0	0	X	5
Bongmyeong A (Shim / Lim)	1	0	1	3	0	2	1	X	8

Sheet D	1	2	3	4	5	6	7	8	Final
Gyeongbuk C (Bang / Pyo)	0	1	2	0	1	0	2	1	7
Gyeongbuk B (Jeong / Kim) 🔨	2	0	0	1	0	1	0	0	4

Sheet E	1	2	3	4	5	6	7	8	Final
Busan (Lim / Lee)	0	1	0	0	0	0	X	X	1
Gangwon C (B. Lee / J. Park) 🔨	2	0	1	1	3	2	X	X	9

^ Seoul B ran out of time, and therefore forfeited the match.

=== Draw 6 ===
Monday, July 24, 20:00

Sheet B	1	2	3	4	5	6	7	8	Final
Seoul C (Yang / Kim) 🔨	0	0	3	0	0	1	0	X	4
Gangwon B (Kim / Yoo)	2	2	0	2	1	0	3	X	10

Sheet C	1	2	3	4	5	6	7	8	Final
Gyeonggi A (S. Kim / J. Kim)	0	0	1	1	0	1	0	X	3
Daejeon (E. Lee / J. Park) 🔨	2	2	0	0	1	0	3	X	8

Sheet D	1	2	3	4	5	6	7	8	Final
Seoul D (Park / Lee) 🔨	3	1	0	0	3	0	2	X	9
Gangwon A (S. Kim / Y. Jeong)	0	0	2	1	0	1	0	X	4

Sheet E	1	2	3	4	5	6	7	8	Final
Gyeongbuk A (Kang / Lee)	2	2	1	2	1	2	0	X	10
Bongmyeong B (Jeong / Kwon) 🔨	0	0	0	0	0	0	3	X	3

=== Draw 7 ===
Tuesday, July 25, 8:00

Sheet A	1	2	3	4	5	6	7	8	Final
Seoul A (J. Kim / B. Jeong) 🔨	2	0	3	1	1	0	3	X	10
Gyeongbuk C (Bang / Pyo)	0	1	0	0	0	1	0	X	2

Sheet C	1	2	3	4	5	6	7	8	Final
Gangwon C (B. Lee / J. Park) 🔨	1	1	0	0	0	0	X	X	2
Gyeongbuk B (Jeong / Kim)	0	0	2	2	4	2	X	X	10

Sheet D	1	2	3	4	5	6	7	8	9	Final
Gyeonggi B (Kang / Kim)	1	1	1	0	0	1	0	4	0	8
Jeonbuk A (J. Kim / D. Kim) 🔨	0	0	0	3	4	0	1	0	1	9

Sheet E	1	2	3	4	5	6	7	8	Final
Seoul B (Lee / Kim) 🔨	3	0	1	2	0	1	0	1	8
Bongmyeong A (Shim / Lim)	0	3	0	0	2	0	1	0	6

=== Draw 8 ===
Tuesday, July 25, 12:00

Sheet A	1	2	3	4	5	6	7	8	Final
Gyeonggi A (S. Kim / J. Kim) 🔨	1	0	0	2	0	0	2	0	5
Seoul D (Park / Lee)	0	1	2	0	1	1	0	1	6

Sheet C	1	2	3	4	5	6	7	8	Final
Bongmyeong B (Jeong / Kwon)	0	1	0	0	0	0	X	X	1
Gangwon A (S. Kim / Y. Jeong) 🔨	4	0	2	1	1	0	X	X	8

Sheet D	1	2	3	4	5	6	7	8	Final
Gangwon B (Kim / Yoo)	2	0	2	0	0	3	0	0	7
Jeonbuk B (Jeong / Chae) 🔨	0	1	0	2	1	0	1	1	6

Sheet E	1	2	3	4	5	6	7	8	Final
Seoul C (Yang / Kim) 🔨	5	1	0	0	4	0	2	X	12
Daejeon (E. Lee / J. Park)	0	0	1	1	0	1	0	X	3

=== Draw 9 ===
Tuesday, July 25, 16:00

Sheet A	1	2	3	4	5	6	7	8	9	Final
Gangwon C (B. Lee / J. Park) 🔨	1	0	2	0	1	1	0	0	1	6
Bongmyeong A (Shim / Lim)	0	1	0	1	0	0	2	1	0	5

Sheet B	1	2	3	4	5	6	7	8	Final
Gyeongbuk B (Jeong / Kim)	1	0	1	1	0	1	1	0	5
Seoul B (Lee / Kim) 🔨	0	2	0	0	4	0	0	1	7

Sheet C	1	2	3	4	5	6	7	8	Final
Busan (Lim / Lee) 🔨	0	0	0	0	1	0	X	X	1
Jeonbuk A (J. Kim / D. Kim)	2	1	1	2	0	4	X	X	10

Sheet E	1	2	3	4	5	6	7	8	Final
Gyeonggi B (Kang / Kim) 🔨	0	0	0	1	0	4	0	1	6
Gyeongbuk C (Bang / Pyo)	1	1	1	0	4	0	1	0	8

=== Draw 10 ===
Tuesday, July 25, 20:00

Sheet A	1	2	3	4	5	6	7	8	Final
Bongmyeong B (Jeong / Kwon) 🔨	1	0	1	0	1	0	0	X	3
Daejeon (E. Lee / J. Park)	0	4	0	4	0	2	1	X	11

Sheet B	1	2	3	4	5	6	7	8	Final
Gangwon A (S. Kim / Y. Jeong)	0	2	0	2	0	0	0	5	9
Seoul C (Yang / Kim) 🔨	1	0	2	0	1	2	1	0	7

Sheet C	1	2	3	4	5	6	7	8	Final
Gyeongbuk A (Kang / Lee) 🔨	0	3	3	0	4	1	X	X	11
Jeonbuk B (Jeong / Chae)	1	0	0	1	0	0	X	X	2

Sheet E	1	2	3	4	5	6	7	8	Final
Gangwon B (Kim / Yoo)	2	0	4	0	1	0	2	X	9
Seoul D (Park / Lee) 🔨	0	1	0	1	0	4	0	X	6

=== Draw 11 ===
Wednesday, July 26, 8:00

Sheet B	1	2	3	4	5	6	7	8	Final
Busan (Lim / Lee)	0	2	0	0	0	1	0	X	3
Gyeongbuk C (Bang / Pyo) 🔨	3	0	1	2	1	0	2	X	9

Sheet C	1	2	3	4	5	6	7	8	9	Final
Seoul B (Lee / Kim) 🔨	1	0	0	2	0	1	0	3	0	7
Seoul A (J. Kim / B. Jeong)	0	2	1	0	2	0	2	0	1	8

Sheet D	1	2	3	4	5	6	7	8	Final
Bongmyeong A (Shim / Lim) 🔨	3	0	2	3	2	0	X	X	10
Gyeongbuk B (Jeong / Kim)	0	1	0	0	0	1	X	X	2

Sheet E	1	2	3	4	5	6	7	8	Final
Jeonbuk A (J. Kim / D. Kim) 🔨	1	1	0	3	0	2	0	X	7
Gangwon C (B. Lee / J. Park)	0	0	1	0	3	0	1	X	5

=== Draw 12 ===
Wednesday, July 26, 12:00

Sheet B	1	2	3	4	5	6	7	8	Final
Gyeongbuk A (Kang / Lee)	1	1	0	2	3	0	1	X	8
Seoul D (Park / Lee) 🔨	0	0	1	0	0	1	0	X	2

Sheet C	1	2	3	4	5	6	7	8	Final
Seoul C (Yang / Kim)	0	2	0	1	0	1	0	X	4
Gyeonggi A (S. Kim / J. Kim) 🔨	1	0	1	0	3	0	2	X	7

Sheet D	1	2	3	4	5	6	7	8	Final
Daejeon (E. Lee / J. Park) 🔨	2	0	1	0	1	0	1	0	5
Gangwon A (S. Kim / Y. Jeong)	0	1	0	2	0	2	0	4	9

Sheet E	1	2	3	4	5	6	7	8	Final
Jeonbuk B (Jeong / Chae) 🔨	0	0	1	1	1	0	3	0	6
Bongmyeong B (Jeong / Kwon)	1	2	0	0	0	3	0	1	7

=== Draw 13 ===
Wednesday, July 26, 16:00

Sheet B	1	2	3	4	5	6	7	8	Final
Gyeonggi B (Kang / Kim)	0	1	0	2	0	0	1	X	4
Gyeongbuk B (Jeong / Kim) 🔨	1	0	1	0	3	2	0	X	7

Sheet C	1	2	3	4	5	6	7	8	Final
Jeonbuk A (J. Kim / D. Kim)	2	1	0	1	1	0	2	0	7
Gyeongbuk C (Bang / Pyo) 🔨	0	0	4	0	0	4	0	1	9

Sheet D	1	2	3	4	5	6	7	8	Final
Seoul A (J. Kim / B. Jeong) 🔨	1	0	4	1	0	2	X	X	8
Gangwon C (B. Lee / J. Park)	0	1	0	0	1	0	X	X	2

Sheet E	1	2	3	4	5	6	7	8	Final
Seoul B (Lee / Kim) 🔨	0	1	3	1	1	1	X	X	7
Busan (Lim / Lee)	1	0	0	0	0	0	X	X	1

=== Draw 14 ===
Wednesday, July 26, 20:00

Sheet B	1	2	3	4	5	6	7	8	Final
Gangwon B (Kim / Yoo)	2	0	3	0	1	0	3	X	9
Gangwon A (S. Kim / Y. Jeong) 🔨	0	1	0	2	0	1	0	X	4

Sheet C	1	2	3	4	5	6	7	8	Final
Jeonbuk B (Jeong / Chae)	0	2	0	1	0	0	2	0	5
Seoul D (Park / Lee) 🔨	2	0	1	0	1	1	0	1	6

Sheet D	1	2	3	4	5	6	7	8	Final
Gyeonggi A (S. Kim / J. Kim) 🔨	1	1	0	3	0	2	2	X	9
Bongmyeong B (Jeong / Kwon)	0	0	1	0	1	0	0	X	2

Sheet E	1	2	3	4	5	6	7	8	Final
Seoul C (Yang / Kim)	0	0	0	2	0	1	0	0	3
Gyeongbuk A (Kang / Lee) 🔨	1	1	2	0	1	0	1	1	7

=== Draw 15 ===
Thursday, July 27, 8:00

Sheet A	1	2	3	4	5	6	7	8	Final
Gyeongbuk C (Bang / Pyo)	0	1	0	4	0	0	1	0	6
Gangwon C (B. Lee / J. Park) 🔨	2	0	1	0	3	2	0	0	8

Sheet B	1	2	3	4	5	6	7	8	Final
Bongmyeong A (Shim / Lim) 🔨	1	2	0	5	1	2	X	X	11
Busan (Lim / Lee)	0	0	2	0	0	0	X	X	2

Sheet D	1	2	3	4	5	6	7	8	Final
Gyeongbuk B (Jeong / Kim)	0	1	2	3	0	0	0	3	9
Jeonbuk A (J. Kim / D. Kim) 🔨	1	0	0	0	2	1	1	0	5

Sheet E	1	2	3	4	5	6	7	8	Final
Seoul A (J. Kim / B. Jeong) 🔨	3	0	0	1	0	0	3	1	8
Gyeonggi B (Kang / Kim)	0	2	1	0	3	1	0	0	7

=== Draw 16 ===
Thursday, July 27, 12:00

Sheet A	1	2	3	4	5	6	7	8	Final
Seoul D (Park / Lee) 🔨	1	0	0	3	5	0	0	1	10
Bongmyeong B (Jeong / Kwon)	0	2	2	0	0	2	1	0	7

Sheet B	1	2	3	4	5	6	7	8	Final
Daejeon (E. Lee / J. Park)	0	0	0	0	3	0	X	X	3
Gyeongbuk A (Kang / Lee) 🔨	2	1	2	2	0	5	X	X	12

Sheet D	1	2	3	4	5	6	7	8	Final
Gangwon A (S. Kim / Y. Jeong) 🔨	5	0	3	2	4	1	X	X	15
Jeonbuk B (Jeong / Chae)	0	3	0	0	0	0	X	X	3

Sheet E	1	2	3	4	5	6	7	8	Final
Gyeonggi A (S. Kim / J. Kim) 🔨	4	0	1	0	3	0	1	0	9
Gangwon B (Kim / Yoo)	0	3	0	3	0	2	0	2	10

=== Draw 17 ===
Thursday, July 27, 16:00

Sheet A	1	2	3	4	5	6	7	8	Final
Bongmyeong A (Shim / Lim)	1	0	4	1	0	2	0	X	8
Jeonbuk A (J. Kim / D. Kim) 🔨	0	1	0	0	1	0	1	X	3

Sheet B	1	2	3	4	5	6	7	8	Final
Gangwon C (B. Lee / J. Park)	0	2	0	3	1	1	0	0	7
Gyeonggi B (Kang / Kim) 🔨	4	0	2	0	0	0	2	4	12

Sheet C	1	2	3	4	5	6	7	8	Final
Busan (Lim / Lee)	0	0	0	2	0	1	X	X	3
Seoul A (J. Kim / B. Jeong) 🔨	4	1	3	0	5	0	X	X	13

Sheet D	1	2	3	4	5	6	7	8	Final
Gyeongbuk C (Bang / Pyo)	1	0	2	2	1	0	3	X	9
Seoul B (Lee / Kim) 🔨	0	3	0	0	0	1	0	X	4

=== Draw 18 ===
Thursday, July 27, 20:00

Sheet A	1	2	3	4	5	6	7	8	Final
Daejeon (E. Lee / J. Park)	0	0	1	0	2	2	0	3	8
Jeonbuk B (Jeong / Chae) 🔨	2	2	0	1	0	0	2	0	7

Sheet B	1	2	3	4	5	6	7	8	Final
Bongmyeong B (Jeong / Kwon)	0	0	0	0	0	2	X	X	2
Gangwon B (Kim / Yoo) 🔨	1	2	4	2	3	0	X	X	12

Sheet C	1	2	3	4	5	6	7	8	Final
Gyeongbuk A (Kang / Lee)	0	2	0	1	0	1	0	0	4
Gyeonggi A (S. Kim / J. Kim) 🔨	1	0	1	0	1	0	2	1	6

Sheet D	1	2	3	4	5	6	7	8	Final
Seoul D (Park / Lee) 🔨	1	3	0	0	1	3	1	X	9
Seoul C (Yang / Kim)	0	0	2	1	0	0	0	X	3

== Playoffs ==
Quarterfinals
B2	Seoul D	7
A3	Seoul B	8
A2	Gyeongbuk C	4
B3	Gangwon A	9

Semifinals
A1	Seoul A	7	7	X
A3	Seoul B	6	3	X
B1	Gangwon B	8	2	5
B3	Gangwon A	4	9	3

Finals
A1	Seoul A	8	3	6
B1	Gangwon B	2	7	4

Bronze medal game
A3	Seoul B	4
B3	Gangwon A	7

=== Quarterfinals ===
Friday, July 28, 10:00

Sheet B	1	2	3	4	5	6	7	8	Final
Gyeongbuk C (Bang / Pyo) 🔨	0	0	2	0	0	2	0	X	4
Gangwon A (S. Kim / Y. Jeong)	2	1	0	3	1	0	2	X	9

Sheet D	1	2	3	4	5	6	7	8	9	Final
Seoul D (Park / Lee) 🔨	0	3	0	0	1	0	3	0	0	7
Seoul B (Lee / Kim)	2	0	1	1	0	2	0	1	1	8

=== Semifinals ===
==== Game 1 ====
Friday, July 28, 16:00

Sheet B	1	2	3	4	5	6	7	8	Final
Seoul A (J. Kim / B. Jeong) 🔨	1	0	2	2	0	0	2	0	7
Seoul B (Lee / Kim)	0	2	0	0	1	1	0	2	6

Sheet D	1	2	3	4	5	6	7	8	Final
Gangwon B (Kim / Yoo) 🔨	2	0	1	2	0	0	2	1	8
Gangwon A (S. Kim / Y. Jeong)	0	1	0	0	1	2	0	0	4

==== Game 2 ====
Saturday, July 29, 10:00

Sheet B	1	2	3	4	5	6	7	8	Final
Gangwon B (Kim / Yoo)	0	1	0	0	0	1	X	X	2
Gangwon A (S. Kim / Y. Jeong) 🔨	5	0	1	2	1	0	X	X	9

Sheet D	1	2	3	4	5	6	7	8	Final
Seoul A (J. Kim / B. Jeong)	2	3	0	0	2	0	X	X	7
Seoul B (Lee / Kim) 🔨	0	0	1	1	0	1	X	X	3

==== Game 3 ====
Saturday, July 29, 16:00

Sheet D	1	2	3	4	5	6	7	8	Final
Gangwon B (Kim / Yoo) 🔨	1	0	1	1	0	1	1	X	5
Gangwon A (S. Kim / Y. Jeong)	0	2	0	0	1	0	0	X	3

=== Bronze medal game ===
Sunday, July 30, 10:00

Sheet A	1	2	3	4	5	6	7	8	Final
Seoul B (Lee / Kim)	0	2	0	1	0	0	1	X	4
Gangwon A (S. Kim / Y. Jeong) 🔨	2	0	2	0	2	1	0	X	7

=== Finals ===
==== Game 1 ====
Sunday, July 30, 10:00

Sheet C	1	2	3	4	5	6	7	8	Final
Seoul A (J. Kim / B. Jeong) 🔨	3	0	2	0	2	1	X	X	8
Gangwon B (Kim / Yoo)	0	1	0	1	0	0	X	X	2

==== Game 2 ====
Sunday, July 30, 16:00

Sheet D	1	2	3	4	5	6	7	8	Final
Seoul A (J. Kim / B. Jeong) 🔨	1	1	0	0	1	0	0	0	3
Gangwon B (Kim / Yoo)	0	0	1	2	0	1	1	2	7

==== Game 3 ====
Monday, July 31, 10:00

Sheet D	1	2	3	4	5	6	7	8	Final
Seoul A (J. Kim / B. Jeong) 🔨	1	0	1	0	1	1	0	2	6
Gangwon B (Kim / Yoo)	0	1	0	1	0	0	2	0	4

== Final standings ==
Place	Team	Athletes
1st place, gold medalist(s)	Seoul A	Kim Ji-yoon / Jeong Byeong-jin
2nd place, silver medalist(s)	Gangwon B	Kim Hye-rin / Yoo Min-hyeon
3rd place, bronze medalist(s)	Gangwon A	Kim Seon-yeong / Jeong Yeong-seok
4	Seoul B	Lee Eun-chae / Kim Min-woo
5	Gyeongbuk C	Bang Yu-jin / Pyo Jeong-min
5	Seoul D	Park You-been / Lee Jeong-jae
7	Gyeongbuk A	Kang Min-hyo / Lee Jae-beom
8	Gyeongbuk B	Jeong Min-jae / Kim Hyo-jun
9	Gyeonggi A	Kim Su-ji / Kim Jeong-min
10	Bongmyeong A	Shim Yoo-jeong / Lim Byeong-hyeon
11	Seoul C	Yang Seung-hee / Kim Tae-hwan
12	Jeonbuk A	Kim Ji-soo / Kim Dae-seok
13	Gyeonggi B	Kang Bo-bae / Kim Hong-geon
14	Daejeon	Lee Eun-chae / Park Jin-woong
15	Gangwon C	Lee Bo-yeong / Park Jin-hwan
16	Bongmyeong B	Jeong An-ah / Kwon Oh-woo
17	Busan	Lim Ye-jin / Lee Dong-in
18	Jeonbuk B	Jeong Jae-hee / Chae Byeong-ho

== See also ==
- 2023 Korean Curling Championships
