= Pyo Jeong-min =

South Korean curler (born 2002)

- Curler
- Born: May 9, 2002 (age 24); Uiseong County, South Korea

Team
- Curling club: Uiseong CC, Uiseong
- Skip: Jeong Byeong-jin
- Third: Kim Hyo-jun
- Second: Pyo Jeong-min
- Lead: Kim Jin-hun
- Alternate: Kim Dae-hyun
- Mixed doubles partner: Park Han-byul

Curling career
- Member Association: South Korea
- World Championship: 1 (2025)
- Pan Continental Championship: 1 (2024)
- World Junior Curling Championship: 2 (2022, 2023)
- Other appearances: Asian Winter Games: 1 (2025); Winter World University Games: 2 (2023, 2025)
Medal record
Men's curling
Representing South Korea
Asian Winter Games
Silver medal – second place	2025 Harbin	Men's
Representing Uiseong
Korean Men's Championship
Gold medal – first place	2024 Uijeongbu
Gold medal – first place	2026 Uiseong
Bronze medal – third place	2025 Uijeongbu

Pyo Jeong-min (Korean: 표정민; born May 9, 2002 in Uiseong County) is a South Korean curler. He is currently the second on the Uiseong-gun Office team that won the national championship in 2024.

== Teams and events ==
=== Men's ===
Season	Skip	Third	Second	Lead	Alternate	Coach	Events
2020–21	Kim Eun-bin	Pyo Jeong-min	Kim Hyo-jun	Kim Jin-hun	Choi Won-yeong		KMCC 2020 (4th)
2021–22	Lee Jae-beom	Kim Eun-bin	Kim Hyo-jun	Pyo Jeong-min	Kim Jin-hun	Kim Chi Gu	WJCC 2022 (7th)
2022–23	Lee Jae-beom	Kim Eun-bin	Kim Hyo-jun	Pyo Jeong-min	Kim Jin-hun		KMCC 2022 (5th)
2022–23	Kim Hyo-jun (fourth)	Lee Jae-beom (skip)	Pyo Jeong-min	Kim Jin-hun	Kim Eun-bin	Kim Chi Gu	WUG 2023 (6th)
2022–23	Kim Eun-bin	Kim Hyo-jun	Pyo Jeong-min	Kim Jin-hun		Kim Chi Gu	WJCC 2023 (9th)
2023–24	Lee Jae-beom	Kim Eun-bin	Pyo Jeong-min	Kim Jin-hun	Kim Hyo-jun		KMCC 2023 (5th)
2024–25	Lee Jae-beom	Kim Hyo-jun	Pyo Jeong-min	Kim Eun-bin	Kim Jin-hun	Lee Dong-keun (PCC)	KMCC 2024 (gold); PCC 2024 (5th)
2024–25	Lee Jae-beom	Kim Hyo-jun	Kim Eun-bin	Pyo Jeong-min	Kim Jin-hun	Lee Dong-keun	WUG 2025 (5th); AWG 2025 (silver)
2024–25	Kim Hyo-jun	Kim Eun-bin	Pyo Jeong-min	Kim Jin-hun	Kim Chang-min	Lee Dong-keun	WCC 2025 (13th)
2025–26	Kim Hyo-jun	Kim Eun-bin	Pyo Jeong-min	Kim Jin-hun		Lee Dong-keun	KMCC 2025 (bronze)

=== Mixed doubles ===
Season	Female	Male	Events
2023–24	Bang Yu-jin	Pyo Jeong-min	KMDCC 2023 (5th)

== Personal life ==
As of 2025, he is a student. He started curling in 2011 at the age of 9.
