= Yoo Min-hyeon =

South Korean curler (born 1994)

- Curler
- Born: September 27, 1994 (age 32)

Team
- Curling club: Gangwon Curling, Gangwon Province
- Skip: Kim Soo-hyuk
- Third: Kim Chang-min
- Second: Yoo Min-hyeon
- Lead: Shin Eun-jin
- Mixed doubles partner: Kim Hye-rin

Curling career
- Member Association: South Korea
- World Championship: 2 (2016, 2026)
- Pacific-Asia Championship: 3 (2014, 2015, 2016)
- Pan Continental Championship: 1 (2025)
Medal record
Men's curling
Representing South Korea
Pacific-Asia Championships
Gold medal – first place	2015 Almaty
Bronze medal – third place	2014 Karuizawa
Bronze medal – third place	2016 Uiseong
Asian Winter Games
Bronze medal – third place	2017 Sapporo
Representing Gangwon
Korean Men's Championship
Gold medal – first place	2014 Chongju
Gold medal – first place	2015 Icheon
Gold medal – first place	2016 Uiseong
Silver medal – second place	2017 Icheon
Silver medal – second place	2018 Jincheon
Korean Mixed Doubles Championship
Silver medal – second place	2022 Jincheon
Silver medal – second place	2023 Uijeongbu
Silver medal – second place	2025 Jincheon
Bronze medal – third place	2024 Jincheon
Representing Uiseong
Korean Men's Championship
Gold medal – first place	2025 Uijeongbu
Silver medal – second place	2026 Uiseong
Bronze medal – third place	2024 Uijeongbu

Yoo Min-hyeon (born September 27, 1994) is a South Korean male curler. He currently plays second on the Gyeongbuk Sports Council curling team skipped by Kim Soo-hyuk.

At the international level, he is a 2015 Pacific-Asia champion.

== Teams ==
=== Men's ===
Season	Skip	Third	Second	Lead	Alternate	Coach	Events
2014–15	Kim Soo-hyuk	Kim Tae-hwan	Park Jong-duk	Nam Yoon-ho	Yoo Min-hyeon	Yang Se Young	PACC 2014 (bronze)
2015–16	Kim Soo-hyuk	Kim Tae-hwan	Park Jong-duk	Nam Yoon-ho	Yoo Min-hyeon	Yang Se Young	PACC 2015 (gold); WCC 2016 (11th)
2016–17	Kim Soo-hyuk	Kim Tae-hwan	Park Jong-duk	Nam Yoon-ho	Yoo Min-hyeon	Yang Se Young	PACC 2016 (bronze)
2016–17	Kim Soo-hyuk	Park Jong-duk	Kim Tae-hwan	Nam Yoon-ho	Yoo Min-hyeon	Yang Se Young	AWG 2017 (bronze)
2018–19	Park Jong-duk	Nam Yoon-ho	Yoo Min-hyeon	Kim Jeong-min			
2019–20	Park Jong-duk	Nam Yoon-ho	Yoo Min-hyeon	Kim Jeong-min			
2024–25	Kim Soo-hyuk	Kim Chang-min	Yoo Min-hyeon	Kim Hak-kyun	Jeon Jae-ik		KMCC 2024 (bronze)
2025–26	Kim Soo-hyuk	Kim Chang-min	Yoo Min-hyeon	Kim Hak-kyun	Jeon Jae-ik		KMCC 2025 (gold)

=== Mixed ===
Season	Skip	Third	Second	Lead	Coach	Events
2011–12	Kang Sue-yeon (fourth)	Yoo Min-hyeon (skip)	Kim Eun-bi	Go Ke-on	Kang Yang-Won	WYOG 2012 (12th)

=== Mixed doubles ===
Season	Female	Male	Coach	Events
2011–12	Mako Tamakuma	Yoo Min-hyeon	Shinya Abe	WYOG 2012 (4th)
