= Kim Hyo-jun (curler) =

South Korean curler (born 2003)

- Curler
- Born: April 17, 2003 (age 23); Uiseong County, South Korea

Team
- Curling club: Uiseong CC, Uiseong
- Skip: Jeong Byeong-jin
- Third: Kim Hyo-jun
- Second: Pyo Jeong-min
- Lead: Kim Jin-hun
- Alternate: Kim Dae-hyun
- Mixed doubles partner: Kim Su-hyeon

Curling career
- Member Association: South Korea
- World Championship: 1 (2025)
- Pan Continental Championship: 1 (2024)
- World Junior Curling Championship: 2 (2022, 2023)
- Other appearances: Asian Winter Games: 1 (2025); Winter World University Games: 2 (2023, 2025)
Medal record
Men's curling
Representing South Korea
Asian Winter Games
| Silver medal – second place | 2025 Harbin | Men's |
Representing Uiseong
Korean Men's Championship
| Gold medal – first place | 2024 Uijeongbu |
| Gold medal – first place | 2026 Uiseong |
| Bronze medal – third place | 2025 Uijeongbu |

Kim Hyo-jun (Korean: 김효준; born April 17, 2003 in Uiseong County) is a South Korean curler. He is currently the third of the Uiseong-gun Office team that won the national championship in 2024.

== Teams and events ==
=== Men's ===
| Season | Skip | Third | Second | Lead | Alternate | Coach | Events |
|---|---|---|---|---|---|---|---|
| 2020–21 | Kim Eun-bin | Pyo Jeong-min | Kim Hyo-jun | Kim Jin-hun | Choi Won-yeong | | KMCC 2020 (4th) |
| 2021–22 | Choi Won-yeong | Kim Hyo-jun | Kim Jin-hun | Lee Jun-hwa | Kim Min-je | | KMCC 2021 (5th) |
| 2021–22 | Lee Jae-beom | Kim Eun-bin | Kim Hyo-jun | Pyo Jeong-min | Kim Jin-hun | Kim Chi Gu | WJCC 2022 (7th) |
| 2022–23 | Lee Jae-beom | Kim Eun-bin | Kim Hyo-jun | Pyo Jeong-min | Kim Jin-hun | | KMCC 2022 (5th) |
| 2022–23 | Kim Hyo-jun (fourth) | Lee Jae-beom (skip) | Pyo Jeong-min | Kim Jin-hun | Kim Eun-bin | Kim Chi Gu | WUG 2023 (6th) |
| 2022–23 | Kim Eun-bin | Kim Hyo-jun | Pyo Jeong-min | Kim Jin-hun | | Kim Chi Gu | WJCC 2023 (9th) |
| 2023–24 | Lee Jae-beom | Kim Eun-bin | Pyo Jeong-min | Kim Jin-hun | Kim Hyo-jun | | KMCC 2023 (5th) |
| 2024–25 | Lee Jae-beom | Kim Hyo-jun | Pyo Jeong-min | Kim Eun-bin | Kim Jin-hun | Lee Dong-keun (PCC) | KMCC 2024 (gold); PCC 2024 (5th) |
| 2024–25 | Lee Jae-beom | Kim Hyo-jun | Kim Eun-bin | Pyo Jeong-min | Kim Jin-hun | Lee Dong-keun | WUG 2025 (5th); AWG 2025 (silver) |
| 2024–25 | Kim Hyo-jun | Kim Eun-bin | Pyo Jeong-min | Kim Jin-hun | Kim Chang-min | Lee Dong-keun | WCC 2025 (13th) |
| 2025–26 | Kim Hyo-jun | Kim Eun-bin | Pyo Jeong-min | Kim Jin-hun | | Lee Dong-keun | KMCC 2025 (bronze) |

=== Mixed doubles ===
| Season | Female | Male | Events |
|---|---|---|---|
| 2021–22 | Jeong Min-jae | Kim Hyo-jun | KMDCC 2021 (13th) |
| 2023–24 | Jeong Min-jae | Kim Hyo-jun | KMDCC 2023 (8th) |

== Personal life ==
As of 2025, he is a full-time curler. He started curling in 2015 at the age of 12.
