= 2021 Korean Mixed Doubles Curling Championship =

2021 KB Financial Korean Mixed Doubles Curling Championship
- Host city: Jincheon, South Korea
- Arena: Jincheon National Training Centre
- Dates: July 27 – August 9
- Winner: Gangwon-do Curling Federation Team A
- Female: Kim Min-ji
- Male: Lee Ki-jeong
- Finalist: Seoul Federation (Jang / Jeong)

The 2021 Korean Mixed Doubles Curling Championship, Korea's national mixed doubles curling championships, was held July 27 to August 9, 2021 at the Jincheon National Training Centre in Jincheon, South Korea. The winning pair of Kim Min-ji and Lee Ki-jeong were the Korean National Mixed Doubles Team for the 2021–22 curling season. They represented South Korea at the Olympic Qualification Event in hopes of reaching the 2022 Winter Olympics in Beijing, China and the 2022 World Mixed Doubles Curling Championship. The championship was held in two rounds.

== Summary ==
Due to a rule change in eligibility that allowed men's and women's teams to compete in the mixed doubles discipline, over fifty teams registered in this years championship, a huge increase from the five that competed in 2020. After the qualifiers, the field was narrowed down to just thirty-one teams, and thirty once one team had to drop out. Like the men's and women's championships, the event was scheduled to be held in three rounds. The first round was held in a triple-knockout bracket, which qualified eight teams for the playoffs and the second round. Kim Min-ji and Lee Ki-jeong (Gangwon A) won the first round, qualifying through the A Event and going undefeated en route to winning the round. They defeated Jang Yeong-seo and Jeong Byeong-jin (Seoul Federation), who had also qualified through the A-side 10–0 in the final. Two C Event qualifiers made up the third place game, with Shin Ga-yeong and Park Jun-ha (Jeonbuk B) winning the game 10–3 over reigning mixed doubles champions Kim Ji-yoon and Moon Si-woo (Gyeonggi D). Kim Su-ji and Kim Jeong-min (Gyeonggi C), Yang Tae-i and Lee Ki-bok (Gangwon C), Um Min-ji and Nam Yoon-ho (Jeonbuk A) and Kim Hye-rin and Seong Yu-jin (Gangwon B) all advanced to the second round as well. Round 2 was held in a round robin between the eight qualifying teams. Through the second round, Kim Min-ji and Lee Ki-jeong dominated the field, winning all seven of their games. This meant that no third round was needed as Kim and Lee had won both the first and second round, scoring all ten available points. Yang Tae-i and Lee Ki-bok finished second through the round with a 5–2 record, earning themselves four points. As they had gotten one point from the first round, they finished the tournament with five points, which was tied with Seoul Federation and Gyeonggi D in second place. However, due to Kim and Moon having the worst Draw Shot Challenge of the three teams, they finished in fourth. Gangwon C and Seoul Federation then played a second place game to determine the national team backup, with the team from Seoul coming away as 6–5 winners. Shin Ga-yeong and Park Jun-ha finished in fifth place with four points, followed by Um Min-ji and Nam Yoon-ho in sixth with three points and Kim Hye-rin and Seong Yu-jin tied with Kim Su-ji and Kim Jeong-min in seventh with eight points.

== Medalists ==
Medal	Gold	Silver	Bronze
Team	Gangwon-do Curling Federation Team A Kim Min-ji; Lee Ki-jeong	Seoul Federation; Jang Yeong-seo; Jeong Byeong-jin	Gangwon-do Curling Federation Team C Yang Tae-i; Lee Ki-bok

== Format ==
Due to a rule change in eligibility, everyone who competed at the 2021 Korean Curling Championships was also eligible to compete in the mixed doubles national championship. A series of qualifiers from different regions of Korea were held to narrow the field down from over fifty teams to just thirty teams. (Note: Lim Su-jin / Kwak Byeong-hun dropped out, dropping the field from 31 teams to 30 teams.) The first round is open to all teams that qualified through their regional qualifiers and the second round is open to the eight teams that made the playoffs from the first round. If one team wins both the first and second rounds, then no third round is needed. The third and final round is a best-of-seven series between the winners of rounds one and two to determine the national champion and Olympic representative.

Teams receive points based on their placement in each round. The winner receives five points, the runner-up gets four, third place earns three, fourth place picks up two and the rest of the teams receive one point.

== Qualification process ==
Regional Qualifiers	Vacancies	Qualified
Gyeonggi Qualifier	8	Kim Su-ji / Kim Jeong-min; Seol Ye-ji / Park Se-won; Park Jeong-hwa / Seo Min-guk; Jeong Jae-hee / Yang Woo-jin; Seol Ye-eun / Lee Jun-hyung; Kim Ji-yoon / Moon Si-woo; Gim Un-chi / Jeong Yeong-seok; Park You-been / Kwon Dong-keun
Cheongju Qualifier	4	Shim Yu-jeong / Kwon Oh-woo; Kim Min-seo / Lee Tae-hoon; Park Seo-jin / Moon Hyeon; Lee Yun-ji / Heo Su
Gangwon Qualifier	3	Kim Min-ji / Lee Ki-jeong; Kim Hye-rin / Seong Yu-jin; Yang Tae-i / Lee Ki-bok
Gyeongbuk Qualifier	6	Jang Hye-ji / Jeon Byeong-wook; Jeong Min-jae / Kim Hyo-jun; Lee Eun-chae / Kim Jin-hun; Kang Min-hyo / Choi Won-yeong; Ahn Jeong-yeon / Kim Eun-bin; Yang Seung-hee / Lee Jun-hwa
Jeonbuk Qualifier	4	Um Min-ji / Nam Yoon-ho; Lee Ji-yeong / Seo Seung-ho; Song Yu-jin / Kang Geon; Shin Ga-yeong / Park Jun-ha
Daejeon Region	2	Oh Eun-jin / Hwang Hyeon-jun; Kim Min-hee / Kim Chan-guk
Seoul Region	2	Lee Ga-hee / Baek Jong-cheol; Jang Yeong-seo / Jeong Byeong-jin
Incheon Region	~~1~~	~~Lim Su-jin / Kwak Byeong-hun~~
Busan Region	1	Lim Ye-jin / Lee Don-gin
TOTAL	30	

== Teams ==
The teams are listed as follows:

Female	Male
Ahn Jeong-yeon	Kim Eun-bin
Gim Un-chi	Jeong Yeong-seok
Jang Hye-ji	Jeon Byeong-wook
Jang Yeong-seo	Jeong Byeong-jin
Jeong Jae-hee	Yang Woo-jin
Jeong Min-jae	Kim Hyo-jun
Kang Min-hyo	Choi Won-yeong
Kim Hye-rin	Seong Yu-jin
Kim Ji-yoon	Moon Si-woo
Kim Min-hee	Kim Chan-guk
Kim Min-ji	Lee Ki-jeong
Kim Min-seo	Lee Tae-hoon
Kim Su-ji	Kim Jeong-min
Lee Eun-chae	Kim Jin-hun
Lee Ga-hee	Baek Jong-cheol
Lee Ji-yeong	Seo Seung-ho
Lee Yun-ji	Heo Su
Lim Ye-jin	Lee Don-gin
Oh Eun-jin	Hwang Hyeon-jun
Park Jeong-hwa	Seo Min-guk
Park Seo-jin	Moon Hyeon
Park You-been	Kwon Dong-keun
Seol Ye-eun	Lee Jun-hyung
Seol Ye-ji	Park Se-won
Shim Yu-jeong	Kwon Oh-woo
Shin Ga-yeong	Park Jun-ha
Song Yu-jin	Kang Geon
Um Min-ji	Nam Yoon-ho
Yang Seung-hee	Lee Jun-hwa
Yang Tae-i	Lee Ki-bok

== Round 1 ==
The first round of the championship was held from July 27 to August 6. The eight teams that qualified for the playoffs advanced to the second round.

=== Knockout brackets ===
==== A event ====
First Knockout	Qualifier 1
Kim Hye-rin / Seong Yu-jin	5
Song Yu-jin / Kang Geon	7	Seol Ye-ji / Park Se-won	6
Seol Ye-ji / Park Se-won	8	Seol Ye-ji / Park Se-won	5
Kang Min-hyo / Choi Won-yeong	6	Shin Ga-yeong / Park Jun-ha	6
Lee Eun-chae / Kim Jin-hun	7	Lee Eun-chae / Kim Jin-hun	2
Shin Ga-yeong / Park Jun-ha	11	Shin Ga-yeong / Park Jun-ha	7
Kim Ji-yoon / Moon Si-woo	4	Shin Ga-yeong / Park Jun-ha	5
Kim Min-seo / Lee Tae-hoon	2	Kim Min-ji / Lee Ki-jeong	6
Kim Min-ji / Lee Ki-jeong	8	Kim Min-ji / Lee Ki-jeong	6
Jeong Min-jae / Kim Hyo-jun	9	Jeong Min-jae / Kim Hyo-jun	4
Lee Yun-ji / Heo Su	2	Kim Min-ji / Lee Ki-jeong	6
Gim Un-chi / Jeong Yeong-seok	7	Gim Un-chi / Jeong Yeong-seok	3
Seol Ye-eun / Lee Jun-hyung	4	Gim Un-chi / Jeong Yeong-seok	8
Yang Tae-i / Lee Ki-bok	12	Yang Tae-i / Lee Ki-bok	6
Ahn Jeong-yeon / Kim Eun-bin	2

First Knockout	Qualifier 2
Lee Ji-yeong / Seo Seung-ho	7
Lee Ga-hee / Baek Jong-cheol	5	Lee Ji-yeong / Seo Seung-ho	3
Oh Eun-jin / Hwang Hyeon-jun	2	Um Min-ji / Nam Yoon-ho	13
Um Min-ji / Nam Yoon-ho	9	Um Min-ji / Nam Yoon-ho	8
Kim Min-hee / Kim Chan-guk	0	Jang Yeong-seo / Jeong Byeong-jin	9
Jeong Jae-hee / Yang Woo-jin	12	Jeong Jae-hee / Yang Woo-jin	2
Park Jeong-hwa / Seo Min-guk	5	Jang Yeong-seo / Jeong Byeong-jin	11
Jang Yeong-seo / Jeong Byeong-jin	10	Jang Yeong-seo / Jeong Byeong-jin	8
Park You-been / Kwon Dong-keun	11	Kim Su-ji / Kim Jeong-min	4
Lim Ye-jin / Lee Don-gin	0	Park You-been / Kwon Dong-keun	7
Park Seo-jin / Moon Hyeon	2	Kim Su-ji / Kim Jeong-min	9
Kim Su-ji / Kim Jeong-min	10	Kim Su-ji / Kim Jeong-min	10
Jang Hye-ji / Jeon Byeong-wook	7	Jang Hye-ji / Jeon Byeong-wook	6
Yang Seung-hee / Lee Jun-hwa	1	Jang Hye-ji / Jeon Byeong-wook	11
Shim Yu-jeong / Kwon Oh-woo	1

==== B event ====
Second Knockout	Qualifier 3
Song Yu-jin / Kang Geon	5
Kang Min-hyo / Choi Won-yeong	8	Kang Min-hyo / Choi Won-yeong	7
Lee Eun-chae / Kim Jin-hun	3
Kang Min-hyo / Choi Won-yeong	9
Seol Ye-ji / Park Se-won	4
Kang Min-hyo / Choi Won-yeong	10
Shin Ga-yeong / Park Jun-ha	12
Shin Ga-yeong / Park Jun-ha	7
Kim Ji-yoon / Moon Si-woo	12	Kim Su-ji / Kim Jeong-min	10
Kim Min-seo / Lee Tae-hoon	2	Kim Ji-yoon / Moon Si-woo	4
Jeong Min-jae / Kim Hyo-jun	7
Jeong Min-jae / Kim Hyo-jun	2
Gim Un-chi / Jeong Yeong-seok	11
Gim Un-chi / Jeong Yeong-seok	6
Kim Su-ji / Kim Jeong-min	7

Second Knockout	To Qualifier 4
Lee Yun-ji / Heo Su	3
Seol Ye-eun / Lee Jun-hyung	14	Seol Ye-eun / Lee Jun-hyung	7
Yang Tae-i / Lee Ki-bok	11
Yang Tae-i / Lee Ki-bok	7
Um Min-ji / Nam Yoon-ho	5
Yang Tae-i / Lee Ki-bok	10
Ahn Jeong-yeon / Kim Eun-bin	11	Jang Hye-ji / Jeon Byeong-wook	4
Lee Ga-hee / Baek Jong-cheol	5	Ahn Jeong-yeon / Kim Eun-bin	9
Lee Ji-yeong / Seo Seung-ho	4
Ahn Jeong-yeon / Kim Eun-bin	6	Qualifier 4
Jang Hye-ji / Jeon Byeong-wook	8
Yang Tae-i / Lee Ki-bok	8
Kim Hye-rin / Seong Yu-jin	6

Second Knockout	To Qualifier 4
Oh Eun-jin / Hwang Hyeon-jun	13
Kim Min-hee / Kim Chan-guk	1	Oh Eun-jin / Hwang Hyeon-jun	1
Jeong Jae-hee / Yang Woo-jin	8
Jeong Jae-hee / Yang Woo-jin	5
Park Jeong-hwa / Seo Min-guk	9	Park You-been / Kwon Dong-keun	7
Lim Ye-jin / Lee Don-gin	2	Park Jeong-hwa / Seo Min-guk	6
Park You-been / Kwon Dong-keun	7
Park You-been / Kwon Dong-keun	3
Kim Hye-rin / Seong Yu-jin	7
Park Seo-jin / Moon Hyeon	3
Yang Seung-hee / Lee Jun-hwa	12
Yang Seung-hee / Lee Jun-hwa	2
Kim Hye-rin / Seong Yu-jin	10
Kim Hye-rin / Seong Yu-jin	10
Shim Yu-jeong / Kwon Oh-woo	3

==== C event ====
Third Knockout	Qualifier 5
Song Yu-jin / Kang Geon	10
Kim Min-seo / Lee Tae-hoon	13	Kim Min-seo / Lee Tae-hoon	1
Seol Ye-eun / Lee Jun-hyung	9
Seol Ye-eun / Lee Jun-hyung	3
Ahn Jeong-yeon / Kim Eun-bin	6
Ahn Jeong-yeon / Kim Eun-bin	5
Shin Ga-yeong / Park Jun-ha	6

Third Knockout	Qualifier 6
Lee Yun-ji / Heo Su	1
Lee Ga-hee / Baek Jong-cheol	11	Lee Ga-hee / Baek Jong-cheol	4
Kim Ji-yoon / Moon Si-woo	11
Kim Ji-yoon / Moon Si-woo	8
Jeong Jae-hee / Yang Woo-jin	2
Kim Ji-yoon / Moon Si-woo	10
Gim Un-chi / Jeong Yeong-seok	8
Kim Ji-yoon / Moon Si-woo	9
Kim Min-hee / Kim Chan-guk	7	Kang Min-hyo / Choi Won-yeong	6
Lim Ye-jin / Lee Don-gin	10	Lim Ye-jin / Lee Don-gin	4
Lee Eun-chae / Kim Jin-hun	9
Lee Eun-chae / Kim Jin-hun	2
Jeong Min-jae / Kim Hyo-jun	7
Jeong Min-jae / Kim Hyo-jun	5
Kang Min-hyo / Choi Won-yeong	9

Third Knockout	Qualifier 7
Park Seo-jin / Moon Hyeon	5
Shim Yu-jeong / Kwon Oh-woo	6	Shim Yu-jeong / Kwon Oh-woo	4
Lee Ji-yeong / Seo Seung-ho	8
Lee Ji-yeong / Seo Seung-ho	7
Um Min-ji / Nam Yoon-ho	9
Um Min-ji / Nam Yoon-ho	8
Park You-been / Kwon Dong-keun	6

Third Knockout	Qualifier 8
Oh Eun-jin / Hwang Hyeon-jun	3
Park Jeong-hwa / Seo Min-guk	7	Park Jeong-hwa / Seo Min-guk	9
Yang Seung-hee / Lee Jun-hwa	4
Park Jeong-hwa / Seo Min-guk	6
Seol Ye-ji / Park Se-won	8
Seol Ye-ji / Park Se-won	7
Jang Hye-ji / Jeon Byeong-wook	9
Jang Hye-ji / Jeon Byeong-wook	5
Kim Hye-rin / Seong Yu-jin	6

=== Knockout results ===
All draw times are listed in Korean Standard Time (UTC+09:00).

==== Draw 1 ====
Tuesday, July 27, 9:00 am

Sheet A	1	2	3	4	5	6	7	8	Final
Song Yu-jin / Kang Geon 🔨	0	2	0	0	1	0	4	0	7
Seol Ye-ji / Park Se-won	1	0	3	2	0	1	0	1	8

Sheet B	1	2	3	4	5	6	7	8	9	Final
Kang Min-hyo / Choi Won-yeong	0	1	2	0	2	0	1	0	0	6
Lee Eun-chae / Kim Jin-hun 🔨	1	0	0	2	0	1	0	2	1	7

Sheet C	1	2	3	4	5	6	7	8	Final
Shin Ga-yeong / Park Jun-ha 🔨	2	2	1	2	1	0	3	X	11
Kim Ji-yoon / Moon Si-woo	0	0	0	0	0	4	0	X	4

==== Draw 2 ====
Tuesday, July 27, 2:00 pm

Sheet A	1	2	3	4	5	6	7	8	Final
Gim Un-chi / Jeong Yeong-seok	0	1	0	3	1	0	1	1	7
Seol Ye-eun / Lee Jun-hyung 🔨	1	0	2	0	0	1	0	0	4

Sheet D	1	2	3	4	5	6	7	8	Final
Kim Min-seo / Lee Tae-hoon	0	1	0	1	0	0	0	X	2
Kim Min-ji / Lee Ki-jeong 🔨	2	0	4	0	1	0	1	X	8

Sheet E	1	2	3	4	5	6	7	8	Final
Jeong Min-jae / Kim Hyo-jun 🔨	1	0	3	1	3	1	0	X	9
Lee Yun-ji / Heo Su	0	1	0	0	0	0	1	X	2

==== Draw 3 ====
Tuesday, July 27, 7:00 pm

Sheet A	1	2	3	4	5	6	7	8	Final
Yang Tae-i / Lee Ki-bok 🔨	0	4	2	1	0	5	X	X	12
Ahn Jeong-yeon / Kim Eun-bin	1	0	0	0	1	0	X	X	2

Sheet B	1	2	3	4	5	6	7	8	Final
Lee Ji-yeong / Seo Seung-ho 🔨	0	0	0	2	2	1	2	0	7
Lee Ga-hee / Baek Jong-cheol	1	2	1	0	0	0	0	1	5

Sheet C	1	2	3	4	5	6	7	8	Final
Park Seo-jin / Moon Hyeon	0	1	0	0	1	0	0	X	2
Kim Su-ji / Kim Jeong-min 🔨	2	0	2	3	0	2	1	X	10

==== Draw 4 ====
Wednesday, July 28, 9:00 am

Sheet A	1	2	3	4	5	6	7	8	Final
Kim Min-hee / Kim Chan-guk	0	0	0	0	0	0	X	X	0
Jeong Jae-hee / Yang Woo-jin 🔨	2	1	3	1	3	2	X	X	12

Sheet D	1	2	3	4	5	6	7	8	Final
Jang Hye-ji / Jeon Byeong-wook	1	1	1	0	1	2	1	X	7
Yang Seung-hee / Lee Jun-hwa 🔨	0	0	0	1	0	0	0	X	1

Sheet E	1	2	3	4	5	6	7	8	Final
Park Jeong-hwa / Seo Min-guk 🔨	0	0	1	0	2	0	2	X	5
Jang Yeong-seo / Jeong Byeong-jin	1	2	0	4	0	3	0	X	10

==== Draw 5 ====
Wednesday, July 28, 2:00 pm

Sheet C	1	2	3	4	5	6	7	8	Final
Oh Eun-jin / Hwang Hyeon-jun	0	0	0	2	0	0	X	X	2
Um Min-ji / Nam Yoon-ho 🔨	2	2	2	0	2	1	X	X	9

Sheet D	1	2	3	4	5	6	7	8	Final
Park You-been / Kwon Dong-keun 🔨	1	1	1	1	2	2	3	X	11
Lim Ye-jin / Lee Don-gin	0	0	0	0	0	0	0	X	0

Sheet E	1	2	3	4	5	6	7	8	Final
Kim Hye-rin / Seong Yu-jin	0	0	0	1	0	2	0	2	5
Seol Ye-ji / Park Se-won 🔨	1	1	1	0	1	0	2	0	6

==== Draw 6 ====
Wednesday, July 28, 7:00 pm

Sheet A	1	2	3	4	5	6	7	8	Final
Jang Hye-ji / Jeon Byeong-wook 🔨	1	1	2	3	1	0	3	X	11
Shim Yu-jeong / Kwon Oh-woo	0	0	0	0	0	1	0	X	1

Sheet C	1	2	3	4	5	6	7	8	Final
Kim Min-ji / Lee Ki-jeong 🔨	0	2	0	1	0	2	0	1	6
Jeong Min-jae / Kim Hyo-jun	1	0	1	0	1	0	1	0	4

Sheet D	1	2	3	4	5	6	7	8	Final
Lee Eun-chae / Kim Jin-hun	0	0	1	0	0	1	0	X	2
Shin Ga-yeong / Park Jun-ha 🔨	2	2	0	1	1	0	1	X	7

==== Draw 7 ====
Thursday, July 29, 9:00 am

Sheet A	1	2	3	4	5	6	7	8	Final
Lee Ji-yeong / Seo Seung-ho	0	0	1	0	0	2	0	X	3
Um Min-ji / Nam Yoon-ho 🔨	4	1	0	4	1	0	3	X	13

Sheet B	1	2	3	4	5	6	7	8	Final
Jeong Jae-hee / Yang Woo-jin 🔨	1	0	0	0	0	1	X	X	2
Jang Yeong-seo / Jeong Byeong-jin	0	4	3	2	2	0	X	X	11

Sheet E	1	2	3	4	5	6	7	8	Final
Gim Un-chi / Jeong Yeong-seok	1	0	1	0	1	0	4	1	8
Yang Tae-i / Lee Ki-bok 🔨	0	3	0	2	0	1	0	0	6

==== Draw 8 ====
Thursday, July 29, 2:00 pm

Sheet B	1	2	3	4	5	6	7	8	Final
Park You-been / Kwon Dong-keun 🔨	1	3	1	0	0	1	0	1	7
Kim Su-ji / Kim Jeong-min	0	0	0	3	2	0	4	0	9

Sheet D	1	2	3	4	5	6	7	8	Final
Song Yu-jin / Kang Geon	0	0	2	1	0	2	0	X	5
Kang Min-hyo / Choi Won-yeong 🔨	1	2	0	0	2	0	3	X	8

Sheet E	1	2	3	4	5	6	7	8	Final
Kim Ji-yoon / Moon Si-woo 🔨	4	0	3	2	3	0	X	X	12
Kim Min-seo / Lee Tae-hoon	0	1	0	0	0	1	X	X	2

==== Draw 9 ====
Thursday, July 29, 7:00 pm

Sheet B	1	2	3	4	5	6	7	8	Final
Oh Eun-jin / Hwang Hyeon-jun 🔨	3	2	0	5	1	2	X	X	13
Kim Min-hee / Kim Chan-guk	0	0	1	0	0	0	X	X	0

Sheet C	1	2	3	4	5	6	7	8	Final
Lee Yun-ji / Heo Su 🔨	1	2	0	0	0	0	0	X	3
Seol Ye-eun / Lee Jun-hyung	0	0	4	1	2	4	3	X	14

Sheet D	1	2	3	4	5	6	7	8	Final
Ahn Jeong-yeon / Kim Eun-bin 🔨	2	0	3	0	2	0	4	X	11
Lee Ga-hee / Baek Jong-cheol	0	1	0	1	0	3	0	X	5

==== Draw 10 ====
Friday, July 30, 9:00 am

Sheet A	1	2	3	4	5	6	7	8	Final
Park Jeong-hwa / Seo Min-guk 🔨	0	3	0	3	1	2	X	X	9
Lim Ye-jin / Lee Don-gin	1	0	1	0	0	0	X	X	2

Sheet C	1	2	3	4	5	6	7	8	Final
Kim Hye-rin / Seong Yu-jin	2	1	2	1	0	2	2	X	10
Shim Yu-jeong / Kwon Oh-woo 🔨	0	0	0	0	3	0	0	X	3

Sheet E	1	2	3	4	5	6	7	8	Final
Park Seo-jin / Moon Hyeon	0	1	0	0	1	1	0	X	3
Yang Seung-hee / Lee Jun-hwa 🔨	5	0	2	2	0	0	3	X	12

==== Draw 11 ====
Friday, July 30, 2:00 pm

Sheet A	1	2	3	4	5	6	7	8	9	Final
Seol Ye-ji / Park Se-won	0	0	2	0	1	1	0	1	0	5
Shin Ga-yeong / Park Jun-ha 🔨	1	1	0	1	0	0	2	0	1	6

Sheet B	1	2	3	4	5	6	7	8	Final
Kim Min-ji / Lee Ki-jeong 🔨	2	0	0	1	1	0	2	X	6
Gim Un-chi / Jeong Yeong-seok	0	1	1	0	0	1	0	X	3

Sheet D	1	2	3	4	5	6	7	8	Final
Um Min-ji / Nam Yoon-ho	1	0	2	2	0	3	0	0	8
Jang Yeong-seo / Jeong Byeong-jin 🔨	0	2	0	0	3	0	2	2	9

==== Draw 12 ====
Friday, July 30, 7:00 pm

Sheet C	1	2	3	4	5	6	7	8	Final
Kim Su-ji / Kim Jeong-min	0	3	0	4	0	3	0	X	10
Jang Hye-ji / Jeon Byeong-wook 🔨	2	0	1	0	1	0	2	X	6

Sheet D	1	2	3	4	5	6	7	8	Final
Kim Ji-yoon / Moon Si-woo 🔨	2	0	0	1	1	0	0	X	4
Jeong Min-jae / Kim Hyo-jun	0	2	1	0	0	3	1	X	7

Sheet E	1	2	3	4	5	6	7	8	Final
Kang Min-hyo / Choi Won-yeong 🔨	2	0	1	1	0	0	3	X	7
Lee Eun-chae / Kim Jin-hun	0	1	0	0	1	1	0	X	3

==== Draw 13 ====
Saturday, July 31, 9:00 am

Sheet A	1	2	3	4	5	6	7	8	Final
Seol Ye-eun / Lee Jun-hyung 🔨	3	0	2	0	1	1	0	0	7
Yang Tae-i / Lee Ki-bok	0	4	0	4	0	0	2	1	11

Sheet B	1	2	3	4	5	6	7	8	Final
Ahn Jeong-yeon / Kim Eun-bin	2	2	2	0	3	0	0	X	9
Lee Ji-yeong / Seo Seung-ho 🔨	0	0	0	1	0	2	1	X	4

Sheet C	1	2	3	4	5	6	7	8	Final
Oh Eun-jin / Hwang Hyeon-jun 🔨	0	0	1	0	0	0	X	X	1
Jeong Jae-hee / Yang Woo-jin	1	4	0	1	1	1	X	X	8

==== Draw 14 ====
Saturday, July 31, 2:00 pm

Sheet C	1	2	3	4	5	6	7	8	Final
Shin Ga-yeong / Park Jun-ha	0	1	0	2	0	0	1	1	5
Kim Min-ji / Lee Ki-jeong 🔨	2	0	1	0	2	1	0	0	6

Sheet D	1	2	3	4	5	6	7	8	Final
Yang Seung-hee / Lee Jun-hwa 🔨	0	2	0	0	0	0	0	X	2
Kim Hye-rin / Seong Yu-jin	3	0	2	2	1	1	1	X	10

Sheet E	1	2	3	4	5	6	7	8	9	Final
Park Jeong-hwa / Seo Min-guk	1	1	0	0	0	2	0	2	0	6
Park You-been / Kwon Dong-keun 🔨	0	0	1	2	1	0	2	0	1	7

==== Draw 15 ====
Saturday, July 31, 7:00 pm

Sheet A	1	2	3	4	5	6	7	8	Final
Jang Yeong-seo / Jeong Byeong-jin 🔨	4	0	0	2	1	0	1	X	8
Kim Su-ji / Kim Jeong-min	0	2	1	0	0	1	0	X	4

Sheet B	1	2	3	4	5	6	7	8	9	Final
Song Yu-jin / Kang Geon	2	0	4	0	1	1	0	2	0	10
Kim Min-seo / Lee Tae-hoon 🔨	0	1	0	5	0	0	4	0	3	13

Sheet E	1	2	3	4	5	6	7	8	Final
Lee Yun-ji / Heo Su 🔨	0	0	0	0	0	1	0	X	1
Lee Ga-hee / Baek Jong-cheol	3	1	1	2	2	0	2	X	11

==== Draw 16 ====
Sunday, August 1, 9:00 am

Sheet A	1	2	3	4	5	6	7	8	Final
Oh Eun-jin / Hwang Hyeon-jun	0	1	0	0	2	0	0	X	3
Park Jeong-hwa / Seo Min-guk 🔨	1	0	1	3	0	1	1	X	7

Sheet B	1	2	3	4	5	6	7	8	Final
Park Seo-jin / Moon Hyeon	1	0	0	1	1	0	2	0	5
Shim Yu-jeong / Kwon Oh-woo 🔨	0	2	1	0	0	1	0	2	6

Sheet C	1	2	3	4	5	6	7	8	Final
Kim Min-hee / Kim Chan-guk	0	0	1	0	1	3	2	0	7
Lim Ye-jin / Lee Don-gin 🔨	3	2	0	4	0	0	0	1	10

==== Draw 17 ====
Sunday, August 1, 2:00 pm

Sheet B	1	2	3	4	5	6	7	8	Final
Yang Tae-i / Lee Ki-bok 🔨	4	0	0	2	0	1	0	X	7
Um Min-ji / Nam Yoon-ho	0	1	1	0	2	0	1	X	5

Sheet D	1	2	3	4	5	6	7	8	Final
Kang Min-hyo / Choi Won-yeong 🔨	0	4	1	0	1	0	3	X	9
Seol Ye-ji / Park Se-won	2	0	0	1	0	1	0	X	4

Sheet E	1	2	3	4	5	6	7	8	Final
Jeong Min-jae / Kim Hyo-jun	0	0	1	0	1	0	X	X	2
Gim Un-chi / Jeong Yeong-seok 🔨	4	1	0	3	0	3	X	X	11

==== Draw 18 ====
Sunday, August 1, 7:00 pm

Sheet D	1	2	3	4	5	6	7	8	Final
Jeong Jae-hee / Yang Woo-jin	2	1	0	0	0	1	0	1	5
Park You-been / Kwon Dong-keun 🔨	0	0	1	2	1	0	3	0	7

Sheet E	1	2	3	4	5	6	7	8	Final
Ahn Jeong-yeon / Kim Eun-bin	0	1	0	0	2	1	2	0	6
Jang Hye-ji / Jeon Byeong-wook 🔨	2	0	2	3	0	0	0	1	8

==== Draw 19 ====
Monday, August 2, 9:00 am

Sheet A	1	2	3	4	5	6	7	8	Final
Lee Ga-hee / Baek Jong-cheol	0	3	0	0	0	1	0	X	4
Kim Ji-yoon / Moon Si-woo 🔨	4	0	1	2	2	0	2	X	11

Sheet C	1	2	3	4	5	6	7	8	Final
Kim Min-seo / Lee Tae-hoon	0	0	0	0	0	1	X	X	1
Seol Ye-eun / Lee Jun-hyung 🔨	3	1	2	2	1	0	X	X	9

Sheet D	1	2	3	4	5	6	7	8	Final
Lim Ye-jin / Lee Don-gin	0	1	0	0	0	0	3	X	4
Lee Eun-chae / Kim Jin-hun 🔨	1	0	2	2	2	2	0	X	9

==== Draw 20 ====
Monday, August 2, 2:00 pm

Sheet A	1	2	3	4	5	6	7	8	Final
Shim Yu-jeong / Kwon Oh-woo 🔨	0	0	3	1	0	0	0	X	4
Lee Ji-yeong / Seo Seung-ho	1	1	0	0	3	2	1	X	8

Sheet E	1	2	3	4	5	6	7	8	Final
Park Jeong-hwa / Seo Min-guk	0	2	3	2	0	2	0	X	9
Yang Seung-hee / Lee Jun-hwa 🔨	1	0	0	0	1	0	2	X	4

==== Draw 21 ====
Monday, August 2, 7:00 pm

Sheet C	1	2	3	4	5	6	7	8	9	Final
Gim Un-chi / Jeong Yeong-seok	0	0	2	1	0	2	0	1	0	6
Kim Su-ji / Kim Jeong-min 🔨	1	2	0	0	2	0	1	0	1	7

Sheet D	1	2	3	4	5	6	7	8	Final
Yang Tae-i / Lee Ki-bok 🔨	0	3	2	0	4	0	1	X	10
Jang Hye-ji / Jeon Byeong-wook	1	0	0	2	0	1	0	X	4

Sheet E	1	2	3	4	5	6	7	8	9	Final
Kang Min-hyo / Choi Won-yeong	0	0	0	4	0	3	0	3	0	10
Shin Ga-yeong / Park Jun-ha 🔨	1	1	3	0	2	0	3	0	2	12

==== Draw 22 ====
Tuesday, August 3, 9:00 am

Sheet A	1	2	3	4	5	6	7	8	Final
Park You-been / Kwon Dong-keun	0	1	0	1	0	1	0	X	3
Kim Hye-rin / Seong Yu-jin 🔨	3	0	2	0	1	0	1	X	7

Sheet B	1	2	3	4	5	6	7	8	Final
Seol Ye-eun / Lee Jun-hyung	0	0	0	0	2	0	1	X	3
Ahn Jeong-yeon / Kim Eun-bin 🔨	2	1	1	1	0	1	0	X	6

==== Draw 23 ====
Tuesday, August 3, 2:00 pm

Sheet B	1	2	3	4	5	6	7	8	Final
Lee Eun-chae / Kim Jin-hun 🔨	0	0	0	2	0	0	0	X	2
Jeong Min-jae / Kim Hyo-jun	1	2	1	0	1	1	1	X	7

Sheet C	1	2	3	4	5	6	7	8	Final
Lee Ji-yeong / Seo Seung-ho	0	0	0	3	1	0	3	0	7
Um Min-ji / Nam Yoon-ho 🔨	1	1	1	0	0	3	0	3	9

Sheet E	1	2	3	4	5	6	7	8	Final
Kim Ji-yoon / Moon Si-woo	1	1	0	2	0	3	1	X	8
Jeong Jae-hee / Yang Woo-jin 🔨	0	0	1	0	1	0	0	X	2

==== Draw 24 ====
Tuesday, August 3, 7:00 pm

Sheet A	1	2	3	4	5	6	7	8	Final
Park Jeong-hwa / Seo Min-guk 🔨	1	2	1	0	0	2	0	0	6
Seol Ye-ji / Park Se-won	0	0	0	3	1	0	2	2	8

Sheet C	1	2	3	4	5	6	7	8	Final
Yang Tae-i / Lee Ki-bok 🔨	2	0	2	0	2	0	1	1	8
Kim Hye-rin / Seong Yu-jin	0	2	0	2	0	2	0	0	6

Sheet D	1	2	3	4	5	6	7	8	Final
Shin Ga-yeong / Park Jun-ha 🔨	1	0	1	2	1	0	2	0	7
Kim Su-ji / Kim Jeong-min	0	2	0	0	0	3	0	5	10

==== Draw 25 ====
Wednesday, August 4, 9:00 am

Sheet A	1	2	3	4	5	6	7	8	Final
Seol Ye-ji / Park Se-won	0	2	1	0	1	0	3	0	7
Jang Hye-ji / Jeon Byeong-wook 🔨	3	0	0	2	0	3	0	1	9

Sheet B	1	2	3	4	5	6	7	8	Final
Jeong Min-jae / Kim Hyo-jun	0	0	0	3	1	1	0	X	5
Kang Min-hyo / Choi Won-yeong 🔨	2	2	3	0	0	0	2	X	9

Sheet D	1	2	3	4	5	6	7	8	Final
Kim Ji-yoon / Moon Si-woo	0	1	2	0	6	0	0	1	10
Gim Un-chi / Jeong Yeong-seok 🔨	3	0	0	1	0	3	1	0	8

Sheet E	1	2	3	4	5	6	7	8	Final
Um Min-ji / Nam Yoon-ho	0	3	1	0	2	0	1	1	8
Park You-been / Kwon Dong-keun 🔨	3	0	0	2	0	1	0	0	6

==== Draw 26 ====
Wednesday, August 4, 7:00 pm

Sheet B	1	2	3	4	5	6	7	8	Final
Jang Hye-ji / Jeon Byeong-wook 🔨	1	2	0	1	0	1	0	0	5
Kim Hye-rin / Seong Yu-jin	0	0	2	0	1	0	2	1	6

Sheet C	1	2	3	4	5	6	7	8	Final
Ahn Jeong-yeon / Kim Eun-bin 🔨	1	1	1	0	1	0	1	0	5
Shin Ga-yeong / Park Jun-ha	0	0	0	4	0	1	0	1	6

Sheet E	1	2	3	4	5	6	7	8	Final
Kim Ji-yoon / Moon Si-woo	2	0	2	0	1	1	1	2	9
Kang Min-hyo / Choi Won-yeong 🔨	0	2	0	4	0	0	0	0	6

=== Playoffs ===
Quarterfinals
A2	Jang Yeong-seo / Jeong Byeong-jin	9
C4	Kim Hye-rin / Seong Yu-jin	8
B1	Kim Su-ji / Kim Jeong-min	4
C1	Shin Ga-yeong / Park Jun-ha	8
B2	Yang Tae-i / Lee Ki-bok	4
C2	Kim Ji-yoon / Moon Si-woo	5
A1	Kim Min-ji / Lee Ki-jeong	7
C3	Um Min-ji / Nam Yoon-ho	3

Semifinals
A2	Jang Yeong-seo / Jeong Byeong-jin	8
C1	Shin Ga-yeong / Park Jun-ha	6
C2	Kim Ji-yoon / Moon Si-woo	5
A1	Kim Min-ji / Lee Ki-jeong	7

Final
A2	Jang Yeong-seo / Jeong Byeong-jin	0
A1	Kim Min-ji / Lee Ki-jeong	10
Third place
C1	Shin Ga-yeong / Park Jun-ha	10
C2	Kim Ji-yoon / Moon Si-woo	3

==== Quarterfinals ====
Thursday, August 5, 9:00 am

Sheet A	1	2	3	4	5	6	7	8	Final
Kim Min-ji / Lee Ki-jeong 🔨	2	0	0	1	1	0	3	X	7
Um Min-ji / Nam Yoon-ho	0	1	1	0	0	1	0	X	3

Sheet B	1	2	3	4	5	6	7	8	Final
Yang Tae-i / Lee Ki-bok 🔨	0	0	1	0	1	1	0	1	4
Kim Ji-yoon / Moon Si-woo	1	1	0	2	0	0	1	0	5

Sheet D	1	2	3	4	5	6	7	8	Final
Jang Yeong-seo / Jeong Byeong-jin 🔨	1	0	0	3	2	0	3	0	9
Kim Hye-rin / Seong Yu-jin	0	1	3	0	0	3	0	1	8

Sheet E	1	2	3	4	5	6	7	8	9	Final
Kim Su-ji / Kim Jeong-min 🔨	0	0	1	1	1	0	0	1	0	4
Shin Ga-yeong / Park Jun-ha	1	1	0	0	0	1	1	0	4	8

==== Semifinals ====
Thursday, August 5, 5:00 pm

Sheet A	1	2	3	4	5	6	7	8	Final
Jang Yeong-seo / Jeong Byeong-jin 🔨	2	0	2	0	3	0	0	1	8
Shin Ga-yeong / Park Jun-ha	0	1	0	2	0	2	1	0	6

Sheet D	1	2	3	4	5	6	7	8	Final
Kim Ji-yoon / Moon Si-woo	0	3	0	1	0	0	1	0	5
Kim Min-ji / Lee Ki-jeong 🔨	1	0	2	0	2	1	0	1	7

==== Bronze medal game ====
Friday, August 6, 10:00 am

Sheet A	1	2	3	4	5	6	7	8	Final
Shin Ga-yeong / Park Jun-ha	4	0	0	4	1	1	X	X	10
Kim Ji-yoon / Moon Si-woo 🔨	0	2	1	0	0	0	X	X	3

==== Gold medal game ====
Friday, August 6, 10:00 am

Sheet C	1	2	3	4	5	6	7	8	Final
Jang Yeong-seo / Jeong Byeong-jin	0	0	0	0	0	0	X	X	0
Kim Min-ji / Lee Ki-jeong 🔨	1	1	2	2	2	2	X	X	10

=== Points standings ===
Team	Points
Kim Min-ji / Lee Ki-jeong	5
Jang Yeong-seo / Jeong Byeong-jin	4
Shin Ga-yeong / Park Jun-ha	3
Kim Ji-yoon / Moon Si-woo	2
Kim Hye-rin / Seong Yu-jin	1
Kim Su-ji / Kim Jeong-min	1
Um Min-ji / Nam Yoon-ho	1
Yang Tae-i / Lee Ki-bok	1

== Round 2 ==
The second round of the championship is currently being held from August 6 to 9. As Round 1 champions Kim Min-ji and Lee Ki-jeong won the round, no third round was needed.

=== Round-robin standings ===
Final round-robin standings

Key
National Team
Teams to Second Place Game

Team	W	L	W–L	DSC
Kim Min-ji / Lee Ki-jeong	7	0	–	26.3
Yang Tae-i / Lee Ki-bok	5	2	–	32.4
Kim Ji-yoon / Moon Si-woo	4	3	–	47.9
Um Min-ji / Nam Yoon-ho	3	4	1–0	33.1
Kim Hye-rin / Seong Yu-jin	3	4	0–1	25.5
Jang Yeong-seo / Jeong Byeong-jin	2	5	1–1	41.0
Kim Su-ji / Kim Jeong-min	2	5	1–1	47.7
Shin Ga-yeong / Park Jun-ha	2	5	1–1	55.9

=== Round-robin results ===
All draw times are listed in Korean Standard Time (UTC+09:00).

==== Draw 1 ====
Friday, August 6, 5:00 pm

Sheet A	1	2	3	4	5	6	7	8	Final
Shin Ga-yeong / Park Jun-ha	0	0	3	0	2	0	3	0	8
Kim Min-ji / Lee Ki-jeong 🔨	1	2	0	2	0	3	0	1	9

Sheet B	1	2	3	4	5	6	7	8	Final
Jang Yeong-seo / Jeong Byeong-jin 🔨	1	0	4	0	1	0	1	0	7
Yang Tae-i / Lee Ki-bok	0	1	0	4	0	2	0	1	8

Sheet C	1	2	3	4	5	6	7	8	Final
Kim Hye-rin / Seong Yu-jin 🔨	3	0	0	1	2	0	1	X	7
Kim Ji-yoon / Moon Si-woo	0	2	1	0	0	1	0	X	4

Sheet D	1	2	3	4	5	6	7	8	9	Final
Um Min-ji / Nam Yoon-ho 🔨	1	0	0	0	2	1	0	1	1	6
Kim Su-ji / Kim Jeong-min	0	1	1	2	0	0	1	0	0	5

==== Draw 2 ====
Saturday, August 7, 9:00 am

Sheet A	1	2	3	4	5	6	7	8	Final
Kim Ji-yoon / Moon Si-woo 🔨	0	1	0	1	0	1	0	2	5
Kim Su-ji / Kim Jeong-min	1	0	1	0	1	0	1	0	4

Sheet B	1	2	3	4	5	6	7	8	9	Final
Kim Hye-rin / Seong Yu-jin 🔨	0	1	0	0	0	4	0	1	0	6
Um Min-ji / Nam Yoon-ho	1	0	1	2	1	0	1	0	1	7

Sheet C	1	2	3	4	5	6	7	8	Final
Kim Min-ji / Lee Ki-jeong 🔨	2	0	1	1	0	3	0	X	7
Yang Tae-i / Lee Ki-bok	0	1	0	0	2	0	2	X	5

Sheet D	1	2	3	4	5	6	7	8	Final
Shin Ga-yeong / Park Jun-ha 🔨	2	0	1	0	3	0	0	X	6
Jang Yeong-seo / Jeong Byeong-jin	0	5	0	2	0	3	1	X	11

==== Draw 3 ====
Saturday, August 7, 2:30 pm

Sheet A	1	2	3	4	5	6	7	8	Final
Kim Hye-rin / Seong Yu-jin	1	0	0	0	4	0	0	0	5
Yang Tae-i / Lee Ki-bok 🔨	0	3	1	1	0	3	1	1	10

Sheet B	1	2	3	4	5	6	7	8	9	Final
Shin Ga-yeong / Park Jun-ha	0	0	1	2	0	3	0	1	1	8
Kim Su-ji / Kim Jeong-min 🔨	3	1	0	0	1	0	2	0	0	7

Sheet C	1	2	3	4	5	6	7	8	Final
Um Min-ji / Nam Yoon-ho 🔨	3	0	3	0	2	0	0	X	8
Jang Yeong-seo / Jeong Byeong-jin	0	2	0	4	0	3	2	X	11

Sheet D	1	2	3	4	5	6	7	8	Final
Kim Min-ji / Lee Ki-jeong	0	2	2	0	2	0	2	X	8
Kim Ji-yoon / Moon Si-woo 🔨	2	0	0	1	0	1	0	X	4

==== Draw 4 ====
Saturday, August 7, 8:00 pm

Sheet A	1	2	3	4	5	6	7	8	Final
Jang Yeong-seo / Jeong Byeong-jin 🔨	0	4	0	0	3	1	0	0	8
Kim Ji-yoon / Moon Si-woo	2	0	3	2	0	0	1	1	9

Sheet B	1	2	3	4	5	6	7	8	Final
Um Min-ji / Nam Yoon-ho 🔨	0	2	0	1	0	1	0	X	4
Kim Min-ji / Lee Ki-jeong	1	0	1	0	2	0	5	X	9

Sheet C	1	2	3	4	5	6	7	8	Final
Shin Ga-yeong / Park Jun-ha 🔨	1	0	0	1	0	3	0	0	5
Kim Hye-rin / Seong Yu-jin	0	1	1	0	5	0	1	1	9

Sheet D	1	2	3	4	5	6	7	8	Final
Kim Su-ji / Kim Jeong-min	0	0	0	2	0	0	X	X	2
Yang Tae-i / Lee Ki-bok 🔨	2	1	2	0	2	1	X	X	8

==== Draw 5 ====
Sunday, August 8, 9:00 am

Sheet A	1	2	3	4	5	6	7	8	Final
Um Min-ji / Nam Yoon-ho 🔨	2	0	0	1	1	0	0	1	5
Shin Ga-yeong / Park Jun-ha	0	3	1	0	0	1	1	0	6

Sheet B	1	2	3	4	5	6	7	8	Final
Yang Tae-i / Lee Ki-bok	3	1	0	2	1	1	0	X	8
Kim Ji-yoon / Moon Si-woo 🔨	0	0	4	0	0	0	1	X	5

Sheet C	1	2	3	4	5	6	7	8	Final
Jang Yeong-seo / Jeong Byeong-jin 🔨	4	2	0	0	0	0	0	0	6
Kim Su-ji / Kim Jeong-min	0	0	2	1	1	2	1	1	8

Sheet D	1	2	3	4	5	6	7	8	Final
Kim Hye-rin / Seong Yu-jin	0	1	0	0	0	3	1	0	5
Kim Min-ji / Lee Ki-jeong 🔨	2	0	1	0	2	0	0	1	6

==== Draw 6 ====
Sunday, August 8, 2:30 am

Sheet A	1	2	3	4	5	6	7	8	9	Final
Kim Min-ji / Lee Ki-jeong 🔨	0	1	0	0	2	1	1	0	1	6
Jang Yeong-seo / Jeong Byeong-jin	1	0	2	1	0	0	0	1	0	5

Sheet B	1	2	3	4	5	6	7	8	9	Final
Kim Su-ji / Kim Jeong-min	0	1	0	0	1	0	3	1	1	7
Kim Hye-rin / Seong Yu-jin 🔨	1	0	1	2	0	2	0	0	0	6

Sheet C	1	2	3	4	5	6	7	8	Final
Yang Tae-i / Lee Ki-bok 🔨	2	1	1	0	0	0	2	X	6
Shin Ga-yeong / Park Jun-ha	0	0	0	1	1	2	0	X	4

Sheet D	1	2	3	4	5	6	7	8	Final
Kim Ji-yoon / Moon Si-woo 🔨	1	2	0	3	0	1	2	X	9
Um Min-ji / Nam Yoon-ho	0	0	1	0	2	0	0	X	3

==== Draw 7 ====
Monday, August 9, 9:00 am

Sheet A	1	2	3	4	5	6	7	8	Final
Yang Tae-i / Lee Ki-bok	2	0	0	1	0	0	0	0	3
Um Min-ji / Nam Yoon-ho 🔨	0	2	1	0	1	1	1	1	7

Sheet B	1	2	3	4	5	6	7	8	9	Final
Kim Ji-yoon / Moon Si-woo 🔨	0	0	1	0	1	0	2	1	1	6
Shin Ga-yeong / Park Jun-ha	1	2	0	1	0	1	0	0	0	5

Sheet C	1	2	3	4	5	6	7	8	Final
Kim Su-ji / Kim Jeong-min	0	2	0	2	0	0	X	X	4
Kim Min-ji / Lee Ki-jeong 🔨	2	0	3	0	2	2	X	X	9

Sheet D	1	2	3	4	5	6	7	8	Final
Jang Yeong-seo / Jeong Byeong-jin	0	0	0	1	1	0	3	0	5
Kim Hye-rin / Seong Yu-jin 🔨	1	2	1	0	0	2	0	1	7

=== Points standings ===
Team	R1 pts	R2 pts	Total
Kim Min-ji / Lee Ki-jeong	5	5	10
Yang Tae-i / Lee Ki-bok	1	4	5
Jang Yeong-seo / Jeong Byeong-jin	4	1	5
Kim Ji-yoon / Moon Si-woo	2	3	5 (Note: Due to Kim Ji-yoon and Moon Si-woo having the highest Draw Shot Challenge, they were confirmed as the fourth place team, despite having the same amount as points as the other second place teams.)
Shin Ga-yeong / Park Jun-ha	3	1	4
Um Min-ji / Nam Yoon-ho	1	2	3
Kim Hye-rin / Seong Yu-jin	1	1	2
Kim Su-ji / Kim Jeong-min	1	1	2

=== Playoff ===
Second place game
2	Yang Tae-i / Lee Ki-bok	5
3	Jang Yeong-seo / Jeong Byeong-jin	6

==== Second place game ====
Monday, August 9, 2:30 pm

Sheet C	1	2	3	4	5	6	7	8	Final
Yang Tae-i / Lee Ki-bok 🔨	1	0	0	0	1	0	3	0	5
Jang Yeong-seo / Jeong Byeong-jin	0	1	2	1	0	1	0	1	6

== Qualification ==
=== Gyeonggi Qualifier ===
July 10–19, Uijeongbu Curling Stadium, Uijeongbu

==== Teams ====
The teams are listed as follows:

Female	Male
Gim Un-chi	Jeong Yeong-seok
Jang Hye-ri	Ji Seok-hwan
Jeong Jae-hee	Yang Woo-jin
Kang Bo-bae	Kim Min-sang
Kim Ji-su	Jeong Hyeon-wuk
Kim Ji-yoon	Moon Si-woo
Kim Su-ji	Kim Jeong-min
Kim Ye-hyeon	Kim Seung-min
Lee Eun-chae	Kim Hong-geon
Lee Su-hyeon	Choi Chi-won
Lee Yu-seon	Park Seo-yun
Park Jeong-hwa	Seo Min-guk
Park You-been	Kwon Dong-keun
Seol Ye-eun	Lee Jun-hyung
Seol Ye-ji	Park Se-won

==== Round-robin standings ====
Final round-robin standings

Key
Teams to National Championship
Teams to Tiebreakers

Pool A	W	L	W–L	DSC
Jeong Jae-hee / Yang Woo-jin	5	2	2–1; 1–0	62.98
Park Jeong-hwa / Seo Min-guk	5	2	2–1; 0–1	45.11
Seol Ye-ji / Park Se-won	5	2	1–2; 1–0	39.90
Gim Un-chi / Jeong Yeong-seok	5	2	1–2; 0–1	48.41
Lee Su-hyeon / Choi Chi-won	3	4	1–0	96.15
Jang Hye-ri / Ji Seok-hwan	3	4	0–1	50.34
Lee Eun-chae / Kim Hong-geon	2	5	–	54.93
Kang Bo-bae / Kim Min-sang	0	7	–	52.77

Pool B	W	L	W–L	DSC
Kim Su-ji / Kim Jeong-min	6	0	–	38.28
Seol Ye-eun / Lee Jun-hyung	4	2	1–0	28.30
Kim Ji-yoon / Moon Si-woo	4	2	0–1	48.08
Park You-been / Kwon Dong-keun	3	3	1–0	27.82
Kim Ji-su / Jeong Hyeon-wuk	3	3	0–1	58.90
Kim Ye-hyeon / Kim Seung-min	1	5	–	72.37
Lee Yu-seon / Park Seo-yun	0	6	–	53.49

==== Round-robin results ====
All draw times are listed in Korean Standard Time (UTC+09:00).

===== Draw 1 =====
Saturday, July 10, 9:00 am

Sheet A	1	2	3	4	5	6	7	8	Final
Kim Ji-su / Jeong Hyeon-wuk	1	1	0	1	0	0	1	0	4
Kim Su-ji / Kim Jeong-min 🔨	0	0	2	0	1	2	0	1	6

Sheet B	1	2	3	4	5	6	7	8	Final
Lee Su-hyeon / Choi Chi-won	0	1	1	0	0	2	0	1	5
Jeong Jae-hee / Yang Woo-jin 🔨	3	0	0	1	1	0	1	0	6

Sheet C	1	2	3	4	5	6	7	8	Final
Seol Ye-ji / Park Se-won 🔨	1	1	3	0	1	0	3	X	9
Jang Hye-ri / Ji Seok-hwan	0	0	0	3	0	2	0	X	5

Sheet D	1	2	3	4	5	6	7	8	Final
Seol Ye-eun / Lee Jun-hyung 🔨	3	0	2	1	0	2	1	X	9
Park You-been / Kwon Dong-keun	0	1	0	0	2	0	0	X	3

===== Draw 2 =====
Saturday, July 10, 1:00 pm

Sheet C	1	2	3	4	5	6	7	8	Final
Kang Bo-bae / Kim Min-sang	1	0	0	2	1	1	0	3	8
Gim Un-chi / Jeong Yeong-seok 🔨	0	5	3	0	0	0	1	0	9

Sheet D	1	2	3	4	5	6	7	8	Final
Lee Eun-chae / Kim Hong-geon	2	1	0	0	2	0	3	X	8
Park Jeong-hwa / Seo Min-guk 🔨	0	0	2	1	0	1	0	X	4

Sheet E	1	2	3	4	5	6	7	8	9	Final
Kim Ji-yoon / Moon Si-woo 🔨	0	0	3	0	1	2	1	0	1	8
Lee Yu-seon / Park Seo-yun	1	3	0	1	0	0	0	2	0	7

Sheet F	1	2	3	4	5	6	7	8	Final
Kim Ye-hyeon / Kim Seung-min	0	1	0	1	0	X	X	X	2
Kim Ji-su / Jeong Hyeon-wuk 🔨	4	0	4	0	1	X	X	X	9

===== Draw 3 =====
Saturday, July 10, 4:30 pm

Sheet A	1	2	3	4	5	6	7	8	Final
Kim Su-ji / Kim Jeong-min	0	2	0	0	1	1	1	0	5
Seol Ye-eun / Lee Jun-hyung 🔨	1	0	1	1	0	0	0	1	4

Sheet B	1	2	3	4	5	6	7	8	Final
Park You-been / Kwon Dong-keun	3	0	0	1	0	0	0	X	4
Kim Ji-yoon / Moon Si-woo 🔨	0	1	1	0	3	3	1	X	9

Sheet C	1	2	3	4	5	6	7	8	9	Final
Jeong Jae-hee / Yang Woo-jin	0	1	0	4	1	1	0	1	1	9
Seol Ye-ji / Park Se-won 🔨	3	0	3	0	0	0	2	0	0	8

Sheet D	1	2	3	4	5	6	7	8	Final
Jang Hye-ri / Ji Seok-hwan	0	0	2	0	1	0	0	X	3
Park Jeong-hwa / Seo Min-guk 🔨	1	1	0	1	0	3	3	X	9

Sheet E	1	2	3	4	5	6	7	8	Final
Lee Yu-seon / Park Seo-yun 🔨	0	1	0	0	1	0	3	0	5
Kim Ye-hyeon / Kim Seung-min	2	0	1	1	0	2	0	4	10

Sheet F	1	2	3	4	5	6	7	8	Final
Lee Su-hyeon / Choi Chi-won	0	0	1	2	2	0	2	X	7
Lee Eun-chae / Kim Hong-geon 🔨	1	1	0	0	0	0	0	X	2

===== Draw 4 =====
Monday, July 12, 1:00 pm

Sheet D	1	2	3	4	5	6	7	8	Final
Seol Ye-eun / Lee Jun-hyung	0	2	2	0	0	2	0	2	8
Kim Ji-yoon / Moon Si-woo 🔨	1	0	0	1	1	0	4	0	7

Sheet E	1	2	3	4	5	6	7	8	Final
Gim Un-chi / Jeong Yeong-seok 🔨	2	1	0	2	1	0	2	X	8
Lee Su-hyeon / Choi Chi-won	0	0	1	0	0	1	0	X	2

===== Draw 5 =====
Monday, July 12, 8:00 pm

Sheet C	1	2	3	4	5	6	7	8	9	Final
Kim Ji-yoon / Moon Si-woo 🔨	0	4	0	0	2	0	0	3	1	10
Kim Ye-hyeon / Kim Seung-min	2	0	3	1	0	1	2	0	0	9

Sheet D	1	2	3	4	5	6	7	8	Final
Jang Hye-ri / Ji Seok-hwan 🔨	0	2	1	0	0	2	1	0	5
Lee Eun-chae / Kim Hong-geon	1	0	0	2	1	0	0	1	4

Sheet E	1	2	3	4	5	6	7	8	Final
Park You-been / Kwon Dong-keun 🔨	2	1	0	1	0	3	0	X	7
Lee Yu-seon / Park Seo-yun	0	0	1	0	1	0	1	X	3

Sheet F	1	2	3	4	5	6	7	8	Final
Seol Ye-ji / Park Se-won 🔨	1	1	0	1	0	0	0	0	3
Park Jeong-hwa / Seo Min-guk	0	0	1	0	1	1	2	1	6

===== Draw 6 =====
Tuesday, July 13, 1:00 pm

Sheet C	1	2	3	4	5	6	7	8	Final
Kim Su-ji / Kim Jeong-min 🔨	0	0	4	3	1	2	X	X	10
Park You-been / Kwon Dong-keun	1	1	0	0	0	0	X	X	2

Sheet D	1	2	3	4	5	6	7	8	Final
Seol Ye-ji / Park Se-won 🔨	1	1	3	0	0	3	0	2	10
Gim Un-chi / Jeong Yeong-seok	0	0	0	2	1	0	4	0	7

===== Draw 7 =====
Tuesday, July 13, 8:00 pm

Sheet C	1	2	3	4	5	6	7	8	Final
Kim Ji-su / Jeong Hyeon-wuk	0	0	4	1	0	3	0	2	10
Seol Ye-eun / Lee Jun-hyung 🔨	2	1	0	0	3	0	3	0	9

Sheet D	1	2	3	4	5	6	7	8	Final
Park Jeong-hwa / Seo Min-guk	1	1	2	0	2	0	0	2	8
Kang Bo-bae / Kim Min-sang 🔨	0	0	0	2	0	2	1	0	5

Sheet E	1	2	3	4	5	6	7	8	Final
Lee Eun-chae / Kim Hong-geon	0	2	0	1	1	0	0	X	4
Gim Un-chi / Jeong Yeong-seok 🔨	4	0	5	0	0	1	5	X	15

Sheet F	1	2	3	4	5	6	7	8	Final
Jeong Jae-hee / Yang Woo-jin	1	0	0	3	0	0	1	X	5
Jang Hye-ri / Ji Seok-hwan 🔨	0	2	1	0	4	2	0	X	9

===== Draw 8 =====
Wednesday, July 14, 8:00 pm

Sheet A	1	2	3	4	5	6	7	8	Final
Jeong Jae-hee / Yang Woo-jin	1	0	0	1	0	1	0	X	3
Gim Un-chi / Jeong Yeong-seok 🔨	0	3	1	0	3	0	2	X	9

===== Draw 9 =====
Thursday, July 15, 4:00 pm

Sheet B	1	2	3	4	5	6	7	8	Final
Seol Ye-eun / Lee Jun-hyung	0	3	2	0	2	0	3	X	10
Lee Yu-seon / Park Seo-yun 🔨	1	0	0	1	0	3	0	X	5

Sheet C	1	2	3	4	5	6	7	8	Final
Lee Su-hyeon / Choi Chi-won	0	1	0	0	0	1	0	X	2
Seol Ye-ji / Park Se-won 🔨	1	0	2	1	1	0	3	X	8

Sheet D	1	2	3	4	5	6	7	8	Final
Park You-been / Kwon Dong-keun 🔨	5	0	2	0	1	0	3	X	11
Kim Ye-hyeon / Kim Seung-min	0	1	0	1	0	2	0	X	4

===== Draw 10 =====
Thursday, July 15, 7:30 pm

Sheet B	1	2	3	4	5	6	7	8	Final
Lee Eun-chae / Kim Hong-geon 🔨	4	0	3	0	1	0	3	1	12
Kang Bo-bae / Kim Min-sang	0	1	0	2	0	4	0	0	7

Sheet C	1	2	3	4	5	6	7	8	9	Final
Jeong Jae-hee / Yang Woo-jin 🔨	3	2	0	0	0	1	1	0	1	8
Park Jeong-hwa / Seo Min-guk	0	0	3	2	1	0	0	1	0	7

===== Draw 11 =====
Friday, July 16, 4:30 pm

Sheet B	1	2	3	4	5	6	7	8	9	Final
Jang Hye-ri / Ji Seok-hwan 🔨	1	1	0	1	0	2	0	0	1	6
Kang Bo-bae / Kim Min-sang	0	0	1	0	2	0	1	1	0	5

Sheet C	1	2	3	4	5	6	7	8	Final
Kim Ji-su / Jeong Hyeon-wuk 🔨	0	1	0	0	0	0	X	X	1
Park You-been / Kwon Dong-keun	1	0	2	1	2	2	X	X	8

Sheet D	1	2	3	4	5	6	7	8	Final
Kim Su-ji / Kim Jeong-min 🔨	0	3	0	1	1	1	0	1	7
Lee Yu-seon / Park Seo-yun	1	0	1	0	0	0	4	0	6

Sheet E	1	2	3	4	5	6	7	8	Final
Seol Ye-ji / Park Se-won 🔨	0	2	2	1	0	2	0	X	7
Lee Eun-chae / Kim Hong-geon	1	0	0	0	1	0	1	X	3

===== Draw 12 =====
Friday, July 16, 7:30 pm

Sheet B	1	2	3	4	5	6	7	8	Final
Lee Su-hyeon / Choi Chi-won	2	1	1	1	0	2	0	X	7
Kang Bo-bae / Kim Min-sang 🔨	0	0	0	0	1	0	1	X	2

Sheet C	1	2	3	4	5	6	7	8	Final
Seol Ye-eun / Lee Jun-hyung 🔨	0	1	0	2	0	4	0	0	7
Kim Ye-hyeon / Kim Seung-min	1	0	1	0	1	0	1	2	6

Sheet D	1	2	3	4	5	6	7	8	Final
Park Jeong-hwa / Seo Min-guk 🔨	2	2	0	1	0	0	1	0	7
Gim Un-chi / Jeong Yeong-seok	0	0	1	0	2	1	0	1	6

===== Draw 13 =====
Saturday, July 17, 9:00 am

Sheet B	1	2	3	4	5	6	7	8	Final
Jeong Jae-hee / Yang Woo-jin	0	2	0	2	0	2	0	2	8
Lee Eun-chae / Kim Hong-geon 🔨	1	0	2	0	2	0	2	0	7

Sheet C	1	2	3	4	5	6	7	8	Final
Kim Ji-su / Jeong Hyeon-wuk 🔨	0	2	0	0	2	0	3	0	7
Kim Ji-yoon / Moon Si-woo	1	0	3	3	0	1	0	1	9

Sheet D	1	2	3	4	5	6	7	8	Final
Kim Su-ji / Kim Jeong-min 🔨	4	0	4	0	0	3	X	X	11
Kim Ye-hyeon / Kim Seung-min	0	1	0	1	1	0	X	X	3

Sheet E	1	2	3	4	5	6	7	8	Final
Lee Su-hyeon / Choi Chi-won	0	1	0	1	2	1	1	X	6
Jang Hye-ri / Ji Seok-hwan 🔨	2	0	1	0	0	0	0	X	3

===== Draw 14 =====
Saturday, July 17, 1:00 pm

Sheet D	1	2	3	4	5	6	7	8	Final
Seol Ye-ji / Park Se-won	1	1	0	1	1	1	0	1	6
Kang Bo-bae / Kim Min-sang 🔨	0	0	2	0	0	0	1	0	3

Sheet E	1	2	3	4	5	6	7	8	Final
Kim Su-ji / Kim Jeong-min 🔨	0	3	1	1	0	1	3	X	9
Kim Ji-yoon / Moon Si-woo	1	0	0	0	2	0	0	X	3

===== Draw 15 =====
Saturday, July 17, 4:30 pm

Sheet B	1	2	3	4	5	6	7	8	Final
Jang Hye-ri / Ji Seok-hwan 🔨	0	0	0	1	0	0	1	X	2
Gim Un-chi / Jeong Yeong-seok	1	2	1	0	1	1	0	X	6

Sheet C	1	2	3	4	5	6	7	8	Final
Lee Su-hyeon / Choi Chi-won 🔨	1	0	0	0	1	0	0	X	2
Park Jeong-hwa / Seo Min-guk	0	2	1	1	0	4	1	X	9

Sheet D	1	2	3	4	5	6	7	8	Final
Jeong Jae-hee / Yang Woo-jin	0	2	2	0	0	2	0	1	7
Kang Bo-bae / Kim Min-sang 🔨	1	0	0	2	2	0	1	0	6

Sheet E	1	2	3	4	5	6	7	8	Final
Kim Ji-su / Jeong Hyeon-wuk	0	1	2	0	0	0	3	1	7
Lee Yu-seon / Park Seo-yun 🔨	1	0	0	1	2	1	0	0	5

===== Tiebreakers =====
Monday, July 19, 4:30 pm

Sheet D	1	2	3	4	5	6	7	8	Final
Gim Un-chi / Jeong Yeong-seok 🔨	0	0	2	1	1	0	2	2	8
Kim Ji-su / Jeong Hyeon-wuk	1	3	0	0	0	2	0	0	6

Sheet E	1	2	3	4	5	6	7	8	Final
Park You-been / Kwon Dong-keun	1	1	0	0	2	0	3	2	9
Lee Su-hyeon / Choi Chi-won 🔨	0	0	2	1	0	1	0	0	4

=== Cheongju Qualifier ===
July 10–11, Cheongju Curling Stadium, Cheongju

==== Teams ====
The teams are listed as follows:

Female	Male
Cho Da-hye	Shim Ju-hwan
Kim Min-seo	Lee Tae-hoon
Kim Su-bin	Lim Byeong-hyeon
Lee Yun-ji	Heo Su
Park Seo-jin	Moon Hyeon
Shim Yu-jeong	Kwon Oh-woo
Shin Eun-ji	Park Gyeong-ho

==== Qualifier results ====
All draw times are listed in Korean Standard Time (UTC+09:00).

===== Game 1 =====
Saturday, July 10, 10:00 am

Sheet B	1	2	3	4	5	6	7	8	Final
Shim Yu-jeong / Kwon Oh-woo 🔨	4	3	1	1	1	2	X	X	12
Cho Da-hye / Shim Ju-hwan	0	0	0	0	0	0	X	X	0

===== Game 2 =====
Saturday, July 10, 3:00 pm

Sheet A	1	2	3	4	5	6	7	8	Final
Kim Min-seo / Lee Tae-hoon 🔨	1	0	1	1	1	2	0	X	6
Kim Su-bin / Lim Byeong-hyeon	0	2	0	0	0	0	2	X	4

===== Game 3 =====
Saturday, July 10, 3:00 pm

Sheet B	1	2	3	4	5	6	7	8	Final
Park Seo-jin / Moon Hyeon 🔨	4	0	3	0	2	2	0	X	11
Shin Eun-ji / Park Gyeong-ho	0	2	0	1	0	0	2	X	5

===== Game 4 =====
Sunday, July 11, 3:00 pm

Sheet A	1	2	3	4	5	6	7	8	Final
Lee Yun-ji / Heo Su 🔨	1	0	1	2	0	1	0	1	6
Shin Eun-ji / Park Gyeong-ho	0	2	0	0	1	0	1	0	4

=== Gangwon Qualifier ===
July 12–15, Gangneung Curling Centre, Gangneung

==== Teams ====
The teams are listed as follows:

Female	Male
Ha Seung-youn	Park Sang-woo
Kim Eun-bee	Lee Ye-jun
Kim Hye-rin	Seong Yu-jin
Kim Min-ji	Lee Ki-jeong
Kim Su-jin	Oh Seung-hoon
Yang Tae-i	Lee Ki-bok

==== Round-robin standings ====
Final round-robin standings

Key
Teams to National Championship

Team	W	L
Kim Min-ji / Lee Ki-jeong	5	0
Kim Hye-rin / Seong Yu-jin	4	1
Yang Tae-i / Lee Ki-bok	3	2
Ha Seung-youn / Park Sang-woo	2	3
Kim Su-jin / Oh Seung-hoon	1	4
Kim Eun-bee / Lee Ye-jun	0	5

==== Round-robin results ====
All draw times are listed in Korean Standard Time (UTC+09:00).

===== Draw 1 =====
Tuesday, July 13, 10:00 am

Sheet B	1	2	3	4	5	6	7	8	Final
Kim Eun-bee / Lee Ye-jun	0	0	0	0	2	0	X	X	2
Kim Min-ji / Lee Ki-jeong 🔨	3	1	3	2	0	3	X	X	12

Sheet C	1	2	3	4	5	6	7	8	Final
Yang Tae-i / Lee Ki-bok	4	0	1	1	1	2	X	X	9
Kim Su-jin / Oh Seung-hoon 🔨	0	1	0	0	0	0	X	X	1

Sheet D	1	2	3	4	5	6	7	8	Final
Kim Hye-rin / Seong Yu-jin 🔨	1	0	4	1	0	2	0	X	8
Ha Seung-youn / Park Sang-woo	0	1	0	0	1	0	1	X	3

===== Draw 2 =====
Tuesday, July 13, 5:00 pm

Sheet A	1	2	3	4	5	6	7	8	Final
Ha Seung-youn / Park Sang-woo 🔨	0	0	0	0	1	0	2	0	3
Kim Min-ji / Lee Ki-jeong	1	1	1	1	0	1	0	2	7

Sheet B	1	2	3	4	5	6	7	8	Final
Yang Tae-i / Lee Ki-bok 🔨	1	0	2	0	2	0	1	0	6
Kim Hye-rin / Seong Yu-jin	0	3	0	1	0	3	0	1	8

Sheet D	1	2	3	4	5	6	7	8	9	Final
Kim Eun-bee / Lee Ye-jun	1	0	1	0	2	0	1	1	0	6
Kim Su-jin / Oh Seung-hoon 🔨	0	1	0	3	0	2	0	0	1	7

===== Draw 3 =====
Wednesday, July 14, 10:00 am

Sheet A	1	2	3	4	5	6	7	8	Final
Kim Eun-bee / Lee Ye-jun 🔨	0	0	0	0	1	0	X	X	1
Yang Tae-i / Lee Ki-bok	2	1	3	2	0	4	X	X	12

Sheet B	1	2	3	4	5	6	7	8	Final
Ha Seung-youn / Park Sang-woo 🔨	4	0	2	0	3	4	X	X	13
Kim Su-jin / Oh Seung-hoon	0	1	0	1	0	0	X	X	2

Sheet C	1	2	3	4	5	6	7	8	Final
Kim Hye-rin / Seong Yu-jin	0	0	0	1	0	1	X	X	2
Kim Min-ji / Lee Ki-jeong 🔨	1	2	1	0	4	0	X	X	8

===== Draw 4 =====
Wednesday, July 14, 5:00 pm

Sheet A	1	2	3	4	5	6	7	8	Final
Kim Su-jin / Oh Seung-hoon 🔨	0	1	0	0	1	2	1	0	5
Kim Hye-rin / Seong Yu-jin	1	0	1	2	0	0	0	2	6

Sheet C	1	2	3	4	5	6	7	8	Final
Ha Seung-youn / Park Sang-woo	0	1	0	1	1	4	0	X	7
Kim Eun-bee / Lee Ye-jun 🔨	1	0	1	0	0	0	2	X	4

Sheet D	1	2	3	4	5	6	7	8	Final
Kim Min-ji / Lee Ki-jeong 🔨	0	3	2	0	1	1	0	1	8
Yang Tae-i / Lee Ki-bok	2	0	0	1	0	0	3	0	6

===== Draw 5 =====
Thursday, July 15, 10:00 am

Sheet A	1	2	3	4	5	6	7	8	Final
Ha Seung-youn / Park Sang-woo	0	0	1	0	1	0	X	X	2
Yang Tae-i / Lee Ki-bok 🔨	1	3	0	2	0	4	X	X	10

Sheet B	1	2	3	4	5	6	7	8	Final
Kim Eun-bee / Lee Ye-jun	0	0	0	1	0	0	X	X	1
Kim Hye-rin / Seong Yu-jin 🔨	1	2	2	0	3	3	X	X	11

Sheet C	1	2	3	4	5	6	7	8	Final
Kim Min-ji / Lee Ki-jeong	0	1	3	0	0	0	2	1	7
Kim Su-jin / Oh Seung-hoon 🔨	1	0	0	1	1	2	0	0	5

=== Gyeongbuk Qualifier ===
July 13–16, Uiseong Curling Centre, Uiseong

==== Teams ====
The teams are listed as follows:

Female	Male
Ahn Jeong-yeon	Kim Eun-bin
Bang Yu-jin	Seol Dong-seok
Jang Hye-ji	Jeon Byeong-wook
Jeong Min-jae	Kim Hyo-jun
Kang Min-hyo	Choi Won-yeong
Kim Hae-jeong	Kim Min-je
Kim Ji-hyeon	Park Seong-min
Kim Su-hyeon	Pyo Jeong-min
Kim Sur-yeong	Kwon Jun-seo
Lee Eun-chae	Kim Jin-hun
Oh Ji-hyeon	Choi Ah-won
Yang Seung-hee	Lee Jun-hwa

==== Round-robin standings ====
Final round-robin standings

Key
Teams to National Championship

Pool A	W	L	DSC
Lee Eun-chae / Kim Jin-hun	3	2	51.8
Ahn Jeong-yeon / Kim Eun-bin	3	2	65.8
Yang Seung-hee / Lee Jun-hwa	3	2	93.4
Kim Hae-jeong / Kim Min-je	3	2	98.1
Bang Yu-jin / Seol Dong-seok	3	2	164.8
Oh Ji-hyeon / Choi Ah-won	0	5	72.6

Pool B	W	L	W–L	DSC
Jang Hye-ji / Jeon Byeong-wook	4	1	–	51.7
Kang Min-hyo / Choi Won-yeong	3	2	1–0	54.4
Jeong Min-jae / Kim Hyo-jun	3	2	0–1	50.9
Kim Su-hyeon / Pyo Jeong-min	2	3	1–0	78.8
Kim Ji-hyeon / Park Seong-min	2	3	0–1	104.8
Kim Sur-yeong / Kwon Jun-seo	1	4	–	86.9

==== Round-robin results ====
All draw times are listed in Korean Standard Time (UTC+09:00).

===== Draw 1 =====
Tuesday, July 13, 2:00 pm

Sheet A	1	2	3	4	5	6	7	8	Final
Oh Ji-hyeon / Choi Ah-won	0	0	1	0	1	0	0	X	2
Kim Hae-jeong / Kim Min-je 🔨	2	2	0	2	0	2	1	X	9

Sheet B	1	2	3	4	5	6	7	8	Final
Lee Eun-chae / Kim Jin-hun 🔨	1	0	0	2	0	0	5	0	8
Bang Yu-jin / Seol Dong-seok	0	3	1	0	1	2	0	3	10

Sheet C	1	2	3	4	5	6	7	8	Final
Ahn Jeong-yeon / Kim Eun-bin	1	0	1	2	0	1	0	X	5
Yang Seung-hee / Lee Jun-hwa 🔨	0	2	0	0	3	0	4	X	9

===== Draw 2 =====
Tuesday, July 13, 5:30 pm

Sheet A	1	2	3	4	5	6	7	8	Final
Kim Sur-yeong / Kwon Jun-seo 🔨	1	0	0	1	2	0	4	0	8
Kim Ji-hyeon / Park Seong-min	0	4	3	0	0	1	0	6	14

Sheet C	1	2	3	4	5	6	7	8	Final
Kang Min-hyo / Choi Won-yeong 🔨	4	0	1	0	0	1	0	2	8
Kim Su-hyeon / Pyo Jeong-min	0	3	0	1	1	0	2	0	7

Sheet D	1	2	3	4	5	6	7	8	Final
Jang Hye-ji / Jeon Byeong-wook 🔨	2	0	4	0	3	0	2	1	12
Jeong Min-jae / Kim Hyo-jun	0	1	0	4	0	3	0	0	8

===== Draw 3 =====
Wednesday, July 14, 9:30 am

Sheet B	1	2	3	4	5	6	7	8	Final
Kim Hae-jeong / Kim Min-je 🔨	3	0	1	0	1	0	1	0	6
Yang Seung-hee / Lee Jun-hwa	0	1	0	3	0	1	0	3	8

Sheet C	1	2	3	4	5	6	7	8	Final
Lee Eun-chae / Kim Jin-hun 🔨	4	1	0	1	2	1	0	0	9
Oh Ji-hyeon / Choi Ah-won	0	0	2	0	0	0	3	1	6

Sheet D	1	2	3	4	5	6	7	8	Final
Bang Yu-jin / Seol Dong-seok	1	1	0	1	0	0	2	X	5
Ahn Jeong-yeon / Kim Eun-bin 🔨	0	0	1	0	5	1	0	X	7

===== Draw 4 =====
Wednesday, July 14, 2:00 pm

Sheet A	1	2	3	4	5	6	7	8	Final
Jang Hye-ji / Jeon Byeong-wook 🔨	2	1	3	0	0	1	3	X	10
Kang Min-hyo / Choi Won-yeong	0	0	0	1	2	0	0	X	3

Sheet B	1	2	3	4	5	6	7	8	Final
Jeong Min-jae / Kim Hyo-jun 🔨	5	0	0	1	2	0	2	X	10
Kim Sur-yeong / Kwon Jun-seo	0	1	1	0	0	2	0	X	4

Sheet D	1	2	3	4	5	6	7	8	Final
Kim Su-hyeon / Pyo Jeong-min 🔨	2	3	4	0	1	1	X	X	11
Kim Ji-hyeon / Park Seong-min	0	0	0	2	0	0	X	X	2

===== Draw 5 =====
Wednesday, July 14, 5:30 pm

Sheet A	1	2	3	4	5	6	7	8	9	Final
Oh Ji-hyeon / Choi Ah-won	0	0	2	0	0	3	1	1	0	7
Ahn Jeong-yeon / Kim Eun-bin 🔨	3	1	0	2	1	0	0	0	1	8

Sheet C	1	2	3	4	5	6	7	8	Final
Bang Yu-jin / Seol Dong-seok	1	0	2	0	1	2	2	X	8
Yang Seung-hee / Lee Jun-hwa 🔨	0	2	0	2	0	0	0	X	4

Sheet D	1	2	3	4	5	6	7	8	Final
Lee Eun-chae / Kim Jin-hun 🔨	3	1	1	0	0	0	1	0	6
Kim Hae-jeong / Kim Min-je	0	0	0	2	1	2	0	3	8

===== Draw 6 =====
Thursday, July 15, 9:30 am

Sheet A	1	2	3	4	5	6	7	8	Final
Jeong Min-jae / Kim Hyo-jun 🔨	2	2	2	2	0	1	X	X	9
Kim Ji-hyeon / Park Seong-min	0	0	0	0	1	0	X	X	1

Sheet B	1	2	3	4	5	6	7	8	Final
Jang Hye-ji / Jeon Byeong-wook 🔨	2	1	0	1	0	5	1	X	10
Kim Su-hyeon / Pyo Jeong-min	0	0	3	0	3	0	0	X	6

Sheet C	1	2	3	4	5	6	7	8	Final
Kang Min-hyo / Choi Won-yeong 🔨	3	0	1	0	6	1	0	X	11
Kim Sur-yeong / Kwon Jun-seo	0	1	0	2	0	0	1	X	4

===== Draw 7 =====
Thursday, July 15, 2:00 pm

Sheet A	1	2	3	4	5	6	7	8	Final
Bang Yu-jin / Seol Dong-seok	1	0	0	1	0	0	1	X	3
Kim Hae-jeong / Kim Min-je 🔨	0	1	1	0	4	1	0	X	7

Sheet B	1	2	3	4	5	6	7	8	Final
Lee Eun-chae / Kim Jin-hun 🔨	1	1	1	0	0	2	0	1	6
Ahn Jeong-yeon / Kim Eun-bin	0	0	0	2	1	0	2	0	5

Sheet D	1	2	3	4	5	6	7	8	Final
Oh Ji-hyeon / Choi Ah-won 🔨	1	1	0	2	0	0	0	X	4
Yang Seung-hee / Lee Jun-hwa	0	0	5	0	4	2	2	X	13

===== Draw 8 =====
Thursday, July 15, 5:30 pm

Sheet B	1	2	3	4	5	6	7	8	Final
Kang Min-hyo / Choi Won-yeong 🔨	0	0	2	1	0	0	0	X	3
Kim Ji-hyeon / Park Seong-min	1	2	0	0	2	1	2	X	8

Sheet C	1	2	3	4	5	6	7	8	9	Final
Jeong Min-jae / Kim Hyo-jun 🔨	1	3	0	1	0	4	0	0	1	10
Kim Su-hyeon / Pyo Jeong-min	0	0	2	0	5	0	1	1	0	9

Sheet D	1	2	3	4	5	6	7	8	Final
Jang Hye-ji / Jeon Byeong-wook 🔨	1	0	0	1	2	0	1	0	5
Kim Sur-yeong / Kwon Jun-seo	0	2	2	0	0	1	0	1	6

===== Draw 9 =====
Friday, July 16, 9:30 am

Sheet A	Final
Lee Eun-chae / Kim Jin-hun	W
Yang Seung-hee / Lee Jun-hwa 🔨	L

Sheet B	Final
Bang Yu-jin / Seol Dong-seok	W
Oh Ji-hyeon / Choi Ah-won 🔨	L

Sheet C	Final
Kim Hae-jeong / Kim Min-je	L
Ahn Jeong-yeon / Kim Eun-bin 🔨	W

===== Draw 10 =====
Friday, July 16, 2:00 pm

Sheet A	1	2	3	4	5	6	7	8	Final
Kim Su-hyeon / Pyo Jeong-min 🔨	4	1	0	0	1	3	X	X	9
Kim Sur-yeong / Kwon Jun-seo	0	0	1	2	0	0	X	X	3

Sheet C	1	2	3	4	5	6	7	8	Final
Jang Hye-ji / Jeon Byeong-wook 🔨	3	2	1	3	1	2	X	X	12
Kim Ji-hyeon / Park Seong-min	0	0	0	0	0	0	X	X	0

Sheet D	1	2	3	4	5	6	7	8	Final
Jeong Min-jae / Kim Hyo-jun 🔨	0	0	0	2	0	1	0	X	3
Kang Min-hyo / Choi Won-yeong	2	1	2	0	2	0	4	X	11

=== Jeonbuk Qualifier ===
July 16–17, Uiseong Curling Centre, Uiseong

==== Teams ====
The teams are listed as follows:

Female	Male
Kang Su-yeon	Kim Dae-seok
Kim Do-hye	Moon Seong-won
Lee Ji-yeong	Seo Seung-ho
Ryu Yeon-seung	Kim Sang-wan
Shin Eun-jin	Kim Hyeong-wu
Shin Ga-yeong	Park Jun-ha
Song Yu-jin	Kang Geon
Um Min-ji	Nam Yoon-ho

==== Round-robin standings ====
After Draw 3

Key
Teams to National Championship

Pool A	W	L
Shin Ga-yeong / Park Jun-ha	2	0
Um Min-ji / Nam Yoon-ho	2	0
Kang Su-yeon / Kim Dae-seok	0	2
Kim Do-hye / Moon Seong-won	0	2

Pool B	W	L
Song Yu-jin / Kang Geon	3	0
Lee Ji-yeong / Seo Seung-ho	2	1
Shin Eun-jin / Kim Hyeong-wu	1	2
Ryu Yeon-seung / Kim Sang-wan	0	3

==== Round-robin results ====
All draw times are listed in Korean Standard Time (UTC+09:00).

===== Draw 1 =====
Friday, July 16, 5:30 pm

Sheet A	1	2	3	4	5	6	7	8	Final
Kim Do-hye / Moon Seong-won 🔨	0	0	1	0	0	0	X	X	1
Shin Ga-yeong / Park Jun-ha	4	3	0	3	3	1	X	X	14

Sheet B	1	2	3	4	5	6	7	8	Final
Kang Su-yeon / Kim Dae-seok 🔨	0	1	0	1	0	1	1	X	4
Um Min-ji / Nam Yoon-ho	4	0	2	0	2	0	0	X	8

Sheet C	1	2	3	4	5	6	7	8	Final
Ryu Yeon-seung / Kim Sang-wan	0	0	0	0	1	0	X	X	1
Lee Ji-yeong / Seo Seung-ho 🔨	3	2	1	3	0	3	X	X	12

Sheet D	1	2	3	4	5	6	7	8	Final
Shin Eun-jin / Kim Hyeong-wu 🔨	3	0	2	0	0	0	1	X	6
Song Yu-jin / Kang Geon	0	4	0	2	3	1	0	X	10

===== Draw 2 =====
Saturday, July 17, 9:30 am

Sheet A	Final
Ryu Yeon-seung / Kim Sang-wan	L
Song Yu-jin / Kang Geon	W

Sheet B	Final
Shin Eun-jin / Kim Hyeong-wu	L
Lee Ji-yeong / Seo Seung-ho	W

Sheet C	Final
Kim Do-hye / Moon Seong-won	
Kang Su-yeon / Kim Dae-seok	

Sheet D	Final
Um Min-ji / Nam Yoon-ho	
Shin Ga-yeong / Park Jun-ha	

===== Draw 3 =====
Saturday, July 17, 2:30 pm

Sheet A	Final
Kim Do-hye / Moon Seong-won	L
Um Min-ji / Nam Yoon-ho	W

Sheet B	Final
Kang Su-yeon / Kim Dae-seok	L
Shin Ga-yeong / Park Jun-ha	W

Sheet C	Final
Ryu Yeon-seung / Kim Sang-wan	L
Shin Eun-jin / Kim Hyeong-wu	W

Sheet D	Final
Song Yu-jin / Kang Geon	W
Lee Ji-yeong / Seo Seung-ho	L

== See also ==
- 2021 Korean Curling Championships
