= Shao Zhilin =

Chinese curler

- Curler
- Born: 12 June 1995 (age 31); Harbin

Team
- Skip: Zou Qiang
- Third: Wang Zhiyu
- Second: Shao Zhilin
- Lead: Xu Jingtao
- Alternate: Ba Dexin

Curling career
- World Championship: 2 (2018, 2019)
- Pacific-Asia Championship: 2 (2017, 2018)
- Other appearances: World Junior Curling Championships: 2 (2012, 2014); Pacific-Asia Junior Curling Championships: 4 (2012, 2013, 2014, 2015)
Medal record
Curling
Representing China
Pacific-Asia Curling Championships
Silver medal – second place	2017 Erina
Silver medal – second place	2018 Gangneung
Pacific-Asia Junior Curling Championships
Gold medal – first place	2012 Jeonju City
Gold medal – first place	2013 Tokoro
Gold medal – first place	2014 Harbin
Silver medal – second place	2015 Naseby

Shao Zhilin (Note: Also known as Zhilin Shao.) (born June 12, 1995) is a Chinese male curler.

== Teams and events ==
Season	Skip	Third	Second	Lead	Alternate	Coach	Events
2011–12	Ma Xiuyue	Xiao Shicheng	Jiang Dongxu	Shao Zhilin	Zhang Zhongbao	Wang Zi	PAJCC 2012 (gold); WJCC 2012 (7th)
2012–13	Zou Qiang	Shao Zhilin	Zhang Tianyu	Liang Shuming	Ling Zhi	Ma Yongjun	PAJCC 2013 (gold)
2013–14	Wang Jinbo	Shao Zhilin	Ling Zhi	Liang Shuming	Zhang Tianyu	Zhang Zhipeng	PAJCC 2014 (gold)
2013–14	Shao Zhilin	Wang Jinbo	Ling Zhi	Liang Shuming	Zhang Tianyu	Zhang Zhipeng	WJCC 2014 (10th)
2014–15	Wang Jinbo	Shao Zhilin	Xu Jingtao	Zhang Tianyu	Zhao Ran	Wang Fengchun	PAJCC 2015 (silver)
2016–17	Ma Xiuyue	Wang Jinbo	Wang Jingyuan	Zhang Tianyu	Shao Zhilin		
2017–18	Zou Dejia	Zou Qiang	Xu Jingtao	Shao Zhilin	Ma Yanlong	Marcel Rocque	PACC 2017 (silver); WMCC 2018 (12th)
2018–19	Zou Qiang	Wang Zhiyu	Shao Zhilin	Xu Jingtao	Jiang Dongxu	Zhang Zhipeng, Daniel Rafael	PACC 2018 (silver)
