= Park Se-won =

South Korean curler

- Curler
- Born: December 20, 1995 (age 30); Uijeongbu, Gyeonggi-do, South Korea

Team
- Curling club: Uijeongbu CC, Uijeongbu, KOR

Curling career
- Member Association: South Korea
- World Championship: 1 (2021)
Medal record
Men's curling
Representing South Korea
Pacific-Asia Junior Championships
Silver medal – second place	2014 Harbin
Representing Gyeonggi
Korean Men's Championship
Gold medal – first place	2020 Gangneung
Bronze medal – third place	2019 Gangneung
Bronze medal – third place	2021 Gangneung

Park Se-won (born December 20, 1995) is a South Korean curler from Uijeongbu, Gyeonggi-do, South Korea. He currently plays lead on the Gyeonggi-do Curling Federation men's team skipped by Kim Jeong-min. While playing second for Jeong Yeong-seok, his team won the 2020 Korean Curling Championships and later represented South Korea at the 2021 World Men's Curling Championship.

== Career ==
Park represented South Korea at the 2014 Pacific-Asia Junior Curling Championships with his team of Kim Seung-min, Jeong Yeong-seok, Oh Seung-hoon and Noh Chang-hyun. After going 6–2 through the round robin, the team lost to China's Wang Jinbo in the final 8–6, missing out on qualifying for the 2014 World Junior Curling Championships.

In 2020, Park and his team of Jeong Yeong-seok, Kim San, Lee Jun-hyung and Kim Seung-min won the 2020 Korean Curling Championships. After losing the 1 vs. 2 page playoff game, his team defeated Kim Soo-hyuk 8–7 in the semifinal and upset defending champions Kim Chang-min 12–10 in the final. Their win earned them the right to represent South Korea at the 2021 World Men's Curling Championship in Calgary, Alberta. For the championship, the team altered their lineup, bringing Kim Jeong-min and Seo Min-guk in to replace Kim San and Kim Seung-min. At the Worlds, they finished with a 2–11 record.

== Personal life ==
Park is a full-time curler.

== Teams ==
Season	Skip	Third	Second	Lead	Alternate
2013–14	Kim Seung-min (Fourth)	Jeong Yeong-seok (Skip)	Oh Seung-hoon	Park Se-won	Noh Chang-hyun
2014–15	Kim Seung-min (Fourth)	Jeong Yeong-seok (Skip)	Oh Seung-hoon	Park Se-won	Noh Chang-hyun
2019–20	Jeong Yeong-seok	Kim Seung-min	Oh Seung-hoon	Park Se-won	Jeong Min-seok
2020–21	Jeong Yeong-seok	Kim San	Park Se-won	Lee Jun-hyung	Kim Seung-min
2020–21	Jeong Yeong-seok	Park Se-won	Kim Jeong-min	Lee Jun-hyung	Seo Min-guk
2021–22	Jeong Yeong-seok	Kim Jeong-min	Park Se-won	Lee Jun-hyung	Seo Min-guk
2022–23	Kim Jeong-min	Kim San	Choi Chi-won	Park Se-won	Kwon Dong-keun
