= 2013 Pacific-Asia Junior Curling Championships =

- Host city: Tokoro, Kitami, Japan
- Arena: Toroko Curling Club
- Dates: January 10–16
- Men's winner: China
- Skip: Zou Qiang
- Third: Shao Zhilin
- Second: Zhang Tianyu
- Lead: Liang Shuming
- Alternate: Ling Zhi
- Finalist: South Korea (Kim Jeong-min)
- Women's winner: Japan
- Skip: Sayaka Yoshimura
- Third: Rina Ida
- Second: Risa Ujihara
- Lead: Mao Ishigaki
- Alternate: Natsuko Ishiyama
- Finalist: China (Jiang Xindi)

The 2013 Pacific-Asia Junior Curling Championships was held from January 10 to 16 at the Toroko Curling Club in Tokoro, Kitami, Japan. In the men's tournament, China defeated Korea with a score of 7–3 to secure a spot at the 2013 World Junior Curling Championships, while in the women's tournament, Japan defeated China with a score of 7–4 to secure a spot at the 2013 World Junior Curling Championships.

== Men ==
=== Teams ===
The teams are listed as follows:

Country	Skip	Third	Second	Lead	Alternate
Australia	Max Thomas	Dean Hewitt	Sam Williams	Grant Hamsey	Mitchell Thomas
China	Zou Qiang	Shao Zhilin	Zhang Tianyu	Liang Shuming	Ling Zhi
Japan	Minato Hayamizu	Hayato Matsumara	Genya Nishizawa	Rui Sato	Tsukasa Horigome
New Zealand	Brett Sargon	Willie Miller	Liam Dowling	Luke Steele	Garion Long
South Korea	Kim Jeong-min	Jang Jin-yeong	Kim San	Seo Min-guk	Kim Woorammiroo

=== Round-robin standings ===
Final round-robin standings

Key
Teams to Playoffs

Country	Skip	W	L
China	Zou Qiang	7	1
New Zealand	Brett Sargon	5	3
South Korea	Kim Jeong-min	5	3
Japan	Minato Hayamizu	3	5
Australia	Max Thomas	0	8

=== Round-robin results ===
All draw times listed in Japan Standard Time (UTC+9).

==== Draw 1 ====
Friday, January 11, 10:00

Sheet A	1	2	3	4	5	6	7	8	9	10	Final
China (Zou) 🔨	0	3	0	4	0	0	0	2	0	X	9
New Zealand (Sargon)	0	0	2	0	0	1	2	0	1	X	6

Sheet B	1	2	3	4	5	6	7	8	9	10	Final
Japan (Hayamizu) 🔨	0	1	1	2	2	0	1	4	X	X	11
Australia (Thomas)	1	0	0	0	0	1	0	0	X	X	2

==== Draw 2 ====
Friday, January 11, 16:00

Sheet D	1	2	3	4	5	6	7	8	9	10	Final
Australia (Thomas) 🔨	1	0	1	0	1	0	0	0	0	X	3
China (Zou)	0	4	0	1	0	0	2	2	1	X	10

Sheet E	1	2	3	4	5	6	7	8	9	10	Final
Japan (Hayamizu) 🔨	2	0	0	3	0	0	0	0	1	X	6
South Korea (Kim)	0	1	0	0	0	3	2	1	0	X	7

==== Draw 3 ====
Saturday, January 12, 10:00

Sheet B	1	2	3	4	5	6	7	8	9	10	11	Final
South Korea (Kim) 🔨	0	4	1	0	1	0	1	0	3	0	0	10
China (Zou)	4	0	0	1	0	3	0	1	0	1	1	11

Sheet C	1	2	3	4	5	6	7	8	9	10	Final
New Zealand (Sargon) 🔨	2	0	3	0	1	2	1	1	0	X	10
Australia (Thomas)	0	2	0	3	0	0	0	0	2	X	7

==== Draw 4 ====
Saturday, January 12, 16:00

Sheet A	1	2	3	4	5	6	7	8	9	10	Final
Australia (Thomas) 🔨	0	1	0	1	0	1	0	1	0	0	4
South Korea (Kim)	1	0	1	0	2	0	1	0	1	1	7

Sheet D	1	2	3	4	5	6	7	8	9	10	11	Final
Japan (Hayamizu) 🔨	1	1	0	1	0	1	1	0	0	2	0	7
New Zealand (Sargon)	0	0	3	0	2	0	0	1	1	0	1	8

==== Draw 5 ====
Sunday, January 13, 10:00

Sheet C	1	2	3	4	5	6	7	8	9	10	Final
China (Zou) 🔨	3	0	0	1	0	1	1	0	0	1	7
Japan (Hayamizu)	0	1	1	0	2	0	0	1	0	0	5

Sheet E	1	2	3	4	5	6	7	8	9	10	Final
South Korea (Kim) 🔨	1	0	2	0	0	0	0	1	0	X	4
New Zealand (Sargon)	0	1	0	1	1	2	1	0	1	X	7

==== Draw 6 ====
Sunday, January 13, 16:00

Sheet A	1	2	3	4	5	6	7	8	9	10	Final
New Zealand (Sargon) 🔨	0	0	0	2	1	0	0	0	0	X	3
China (Zou)	1	1	1	0	0	1	1	1	2	X	8

Sheet B	1	2	3	4	5	6	7	8	9	10	Final
Australia (Thomas) 🔨	0	0	1	1	0	2	1	0	0	X	5
Japan (Hayamizu)	2	1	0	0	1	0	0	4	3	X	11

==== Draw 7 ====
Monday, January 14, 10:00

Sheet C	1	2	3	4	5	6	7	8	9	10	Final
Japan (Hayamizu) 🔨	3	0	0	1	0	1	0	1	2	1	9
China (Zou)	0	2	2	0	1	0	1	0	0	0	6

Sheet D	1	2	3	4	5	6	7	8	9	10	11	Final
New Zealand (Sargon) 🔨	1	1	0	0	0	2	1	0	0	2	0	7
South Korea (Kim)	0	0	2	2	1	0	0	1	1	0	1	8

==== Draw 8 ====
Monday, January 14, 16:00

Sheet B	1	2	3	4	5	6	7	8	9	10	Final
China (Zou) 🔨	1	0	0	3	0	4	0	0	0	1	9
South Korea (Kim)	0	0	2	0	2	0	0	2	1	0	7

Sheet C	1	2	3	4	5	6	7	8	9	10	Final
Australia (Thomas) 🔨	2	0	1	1	0	0	1	0	0	X	5
New Zealand (Sargon)	0	2	0	0	2	1	0	1	1	X	7

==== Draw 9 ====
Tuesday, January 15, 9:00

Sheet D	1	2	3	4	5	6	7	8	9	10	Final
South Korea (Kim) 🔨	1	0	2	0	0	0	3	2	1	X	9
Japan (Hayamizu)	0	1	0	1	0	0	0	0	0	X	2

Sheet E	1	2	3	4	5	6	7	8	9	10	Final
China (Zou) 🔨	2	0	2	3	2	0	0	1	X	X	10
Australia (Thomas)	0	1	0	0	0	2	1	0	X	X	4

==== Draw 10 ====
Tuesday, January 15, 14:30

Sheet A	1	2	3	4	5	6	7	8	9	10	Final
South Korea (Kim) 🔨	2	1	0	0	3	3	1	X	X	X	10
Australia (Thomas)	0	0	1	0	0	0	0	X	X	X	1

Sheet E	1	2	3	4	5	6	7	8	9	10	Final
New Zealand (Sargon) 🔨	1	2	0	1	0	3	0	3	1	X	11
Japan (Hayamizu)	0	0	3	0	1	0	1	0	0	X	5

=== Playoffs ===
Semifinal			Final
			1	China	7
2	New Zealand	3	3	South Korea	3
3	South Korea	7

==== Semifinal ====
Wednesday, January 16, 9:00

Team	1	2	3	4	5	6	7	8	9	10	Final
New Zealand (Sargon)	0	1	0	0	0	1	0	0	1	X	3
South Korea (Kim) 🔨	2	0	1	1	1	0	0	2	0	X	7

==== Final ====
Wednesday, January 16, 14:30

Team	1	2	3	4	5	6	7	8	9	10	Final
China (Zou) 🔨	0	1	1	0	2	1	0	1	0	1	7
South Korea (Kim)	1	0	0	1	0	0	1	0	2	0	3

== Women ==
=== Teams ===
The teams are listed as follows:

Country	Skip	Third	Second	Lead	Alternate
Australia	Victoria Wilson	Marlene Corgat-Taylor	Kelsey Hamsey	Tahli Gill	Samantha Jeffs
China	Jiang Xindi	Zhao Xiyang	Fu Yiwei	Dong Ziqi	Yao Mingyue
Japan	Sayaka Yoshimura	Rina Ida	Risa Ujihara	Mao Ishigaki	Natsuko Ishiyama
New Zealand	Thivya Jeyaranjan	Chelsea Farley	Tessa Farley	Kelsi Heath	Eleanor Adviento
South Korea	Kim Kyeong-ae	Kim Seon-yeong	Kim Ji-hyun	Koo Young-eun	Oh Eun-jin

=== Round-robin standings ===
Final round-robin standings

Key
Teams to Playoffs

Country	Skip	W	L
Japan	Sayaka Yoshimura	7	1
South Korea	Kim Kyeong-ae	6	2
China	Jiang Xindi	5	3
New Zealand	Thivya Jeyaranjan	1	6
Australia	Victoria Wilson	0	7

=== Round-robin results ===
All draw times listed in Japan Standard Time (UTC+9).

==== Draw 1 ====
Friday, January 11, 10:00

Sheet D	1	2	3	4	5	6	7	8	9	10	Final
Japan (Yoshimura) 🔨	3	4	4	0	3	3	4	X	X	X	18
Australia (Wilson)	0	0	0	1	0	2	0	X	X	X	3

Sheet E	1	2	3	4	5	6	7	8	9	10	Final
South Korea (Kim) 🔨	1	0	3	0	5	1	2	X	X	X	12
New Zealand (Jeyaranjan)	0	1	0	1	0	0	0	X	X	X	2

==== Draw 2 ====
Friday, January 11, 16:00

Sheet A	1	2	3	4	5	6	7	8	9	10	Final
South Korea (Kim) 🔨	4	3	1	4	4	0	X	X	X	X	16
Australia (Wilson)	0	0	0	0	0	1	X	X	X	X	1

Sheet C	1	2	3	4	5	6	7	8	9	10	Final
China (Jiang) 🔨	1	0	1	2	3	1	0	1	X	X	9
New Zealand (Jeyaranjan)	0	1	0	0	0	0	1	0	X	X	2

==== Draw 3 ====
Saturday, January 12, 10:00

Sheet D	1	2	3	4	5	6	7	8	9	10	11	Final
South Korea (Kim) 🔨	0	0	0	3	0	0	0	2	0	0	0	5
Japan (Yoshimura)	0	0	0	0	1	0	1	0	2	1	1	6

Sheet E	1	2	3	4	5	6	7	8	9	10	Final
China (Jiang) 🔨	1	1	1	1	2	0	4	X	X	X	10
Australia (Wilson)	0	0	0	0	0	1	0	X	X	X	1

==== Draw 4 ====
Saturday, January 12, 16:00

Sheet B	1	2	3	4	5	6	7	8	9	10	Final
New Zealand (Jeyaranjan) 🔨	4	4	1	2	0	5	X	X	X	X	16
Australia (Wilson)	0	0	0	0	1	0	X	X	X	X	1

Sheet C	1	2	3	4	5	6	7	8	9	10	Final
Japan (Yoshimura) 🔨	0	1	0	0	0	1	0	2	1	0	5
China (Jiang)	1	0	1	1	0	0	2	0	0	1	6

==== Draw 5 ====
Sunday, January 13, 10:00

Sheet A	1	2	3	4	5	6	7	8	9	10	Final
Japan (Yoshimura) 🔨	2	3	1	0	0	2	3	X	X	X	11
New Zealand (Jeyaranjan)	0	0	0	1	1	0	0	X	X	X	2

Sheet B	1	2	3	4	5	6	7	8	9	10	Final
South Korea (Kim) 🔨	0	1	1	0	0	2	0	2	0	X	6
China (Jiang)	0	0	0	0	0	0	2	0	0	X	2

==== Draw 6 ====
Sunday, January 13, 16:00

Sheet D	1	2	3	4	5	6	7	8	9	10	Final
New Zealand (Jeyaranjan) 🔨	2	0	1	0	1	0	1	0	1	0	6
China (Jiang)	0	0	0	2	0	2	0	2	0	2	8

Sheet E	1	2	3	4	5	6	7	8	9	10	Final
Australia (Wilson) 🔨	0	1	0	0	0	1	0	0	X	X	2
South Korea (Kim)	1	0	1	1	1	0	4	5	X	X	13

==== Draw 7 ====
Monday, January 14, 10:00

Sheet A	1	2	3	4	5	6	7	8	9	10	Final
Australia (Wilson) 🔨	0	1	0	0	0	1	0	2	X	X	4
China (Jiang)	1	0	2	3	4	0	2	0	X	X	12

Sheet B	1	2	3	4	5	6	7	8	9	10	Final
Japan (Yoshimura) 🔨	3	0	0	1	0	1	0	1	2	1	9
South Korea (Kim)	0	2	2	0	1	0	1	0	0	0	6

==== Draw 8 ====
Monday, January 14, 16:00

Sheet A	1	2	3	4	5	6	7	8	9	10	11	Final
China (Jiang) 🔨	0	1	0	1	0	0	2	0	0	1	0	5
South Korea (Kim)	0	0	1	0	2	0	0	2	0	0	1	6

Sheet C	1	2	3	4	5	6	7	8	9	10	Final
New Zealand (Jeyaranjan) 🔨	0	1	0	0	0	1	0	X	X	X	2
Japan (Yoshimura)	2	0	2	3	3	0	2	X	X	X	12

==== Draw 9 ====
Tuesday, January 15, 9:00

Sheet D	Final
Australia (Wilson) 🔨	0
New Zealand (Jeyaranjan)	0

Sheet E	1	2	3	4	5	6	7	8	9	10	Final
Japan (Yoshimura) 🔨	1	0	0	1	1	0	2	2	0	X	7
China (Jiang)	0	0	1	0	0	1	0	0	1	X	3

==== Draw 10 ====
Tuesday, January 15, 14:30

Sheet B	1	2	3	4	5	6	7	8	9	10	Final
Australia (Wilson) 🔨	0	1	0	0	1	0	X	X	X	X	2
Japan (Yoshimura)	4	0	5	1	0	3	X	X	X	X	13

Sheet C	1	2	3	4	5	6	7	8	9	10	Final
New Zealand (Jeyaranjan) 🔨	1	0	1	0	0	2	0	1	0	X	5
South Korea (Kim)	0	3	0	2	1	0	2	0	4	X	12

=== Playoffs ===
Semifinal			Final
			1	Japan	7
2	South Korea	3	3	China	4
3	China	6

==== Semifinal ====
Wednesday, January 16, 9:00

Team	1	2	3	4	5	6	7	8	9	10	Final
South Korea (Kim) 🔨	0	1	0	0	1	0	0	1	0	X	3
China (Jiang)	1	0	2	1	0	0	1	0	1	X	6

==== Final ====
Wednesday, January 16, 14:30

Team	1	2	3	4	5	6	7	8	9	10	Final
Japan (Yoshimura)	0	0	2	1	0	0	0	2	2	X	7
China (Jiang) 🔨	1	1	0	0	0	1	1	0	0	X	4
