= Oh Eun-jin =

South Korean curler (born 1993)

- Curler
- Born: February 26, 1993 (age 33)

Team
- Curling club: Jeonbuk CC, Jeonbuk

Curling career
- Member Association: South Korea
Medal record
Women's curling
Representing South Korea
World Junior Curling Championships
Silver medal – second place	2014 Flims
Pacific-Asia Junior Championships
Gold medal – first place	2014 Harbin
Silver medal – second place	2010 Nayoro
Silver medal – second place	2011 Naseby
Bronze medal – third place	2013 Tokoro
Representing Uiseong
Korean Women's Championship
Bronze medal – third place	2011 Uijeongbu

Oh Eun-jin (born February 26, 1993) is a South Korean curler from Jeonbuk. She won a gold medal at the 2014 Pacific-Asia Junior Curling Championships and a silver medal at the 2014 World Junior Curling Championships.

== Career ==
Oh competed in four Pacific-Asia Junior Curling Championships during her junior career in 2010, 2011, 2013 and 2014. In 2010 and 2011, she won silver medals playing for the Kim Eun-jung rink. Her next two appearances were with Kim Kyeong-ae where they won bronze in 2013 and the gold medal in 2014. Her 2014 championship rink also represented South Korea at the 2014 World Junior Curling Championships where they won the silver medal after losing the final to Canada's Kelsey Rocque. She joined the Kim Su-ji rink at lead for the 2015–16 season and the team had a fifth-place finish at the 2016 Korean National Curling Championships. The next season, her rink played in four tour events and qualified for the playoffs at one, the 2016 Medicine Hat Charity Classic. Oh took over the team as skip for the 2017–18 season. Um Min-ji took over skipping Oh's rink for the 2020–21 season.

== Teams ==
Season	Skip	Third	Second	Lead	Alternate
2009–10	Kim Eun-jung	Kim Kyeong-ae	Kim Seon-yeong	Kim Yeong-mi	Oh Eun-jin
2010–11	Kim Eun-jung	Kim Kyeong-ae	Oh Eun-jin	Kim Yeong-mi	Kim Seon-yeong
2012–13	Kim Kyeong-ae	Kim Seon-yeong	Kim Ji-hyeon	Koo Young-eun	Oh Eun-jin
2013–14	Kim Kyeong-ae	Kim Seon-yeong	Kim Ji-hyeon	Koo Young-eun	Oh Eun-jin
2015–16	Hwang Su-bin	Kim Ji-hyeon	Koo Young-eun	Oh Eun-jin	Park Kyung-mi
2016–17	Kim Su-ji	Park Jeong-hwa	Koo Young-eun	Oh Eun-jin	Hwang Su-bin
2017–18	Oh Eun-jin	Kim Su-ji	Kim Ji-hyeon	Park Jeong-hwa	Hwang Su-bin
2018–19	Oh Eun-jin	Jeong Jae-yi	Kang Sue-yeon	Kim Eun-bi	Jeong Yu-jin
2019–20	Oh Eun-jin	Jeong Jae-yi	Kim Ji-hyeon	Shin Ga-yeong	Jeong Dag-yeom
