= Kim Jeong-min (curler) =

South Korean curler

- Curler
- Born: January 6, 1992 (age 34); Seoul, South Korea

Team
- Curling club: Uijeongbu CC, Uijeongbu, KOR
- Skip: Lee Jae-beom
- Third: Lee Ki-jeong
- Second: Kim Min-woo
- Lead: Kim Jeong-min
- Mixed doubles partner: Park You-been

Curling career
- Member Association: South Korea
- World Championship: 1 (2021)
Medal record
Men's curling
Representing South Korea
Pacific-Asia Junior Championships
Silver medal – second place	2011 Naseby
Silver medal – second place	2012 Jeonju City
Silver medal – second place	2013 Tokoro
Representing Seoul
Korean Men's Championship
Silver medal – second place	2025 Uijeongbu
Bronze medal – third place	2012 Uijeongbu
Representing Gyeonggi
Korean Men's Championship
Bronze medal – third place	2021 Gangneung

Kim Jeong-min (born January 6, 1992, in Seoul) is a South Korean curler from Uijeongbu, Gyeonggi-do, South Korea. He currently plays lead on the Seoul City Hall curling team skipped by Lee Jae-beom. While playing third for Jeong Yeong-seok, he represented South Korea at the 2021 World Men's Curling Championship.

== Career ==
Kim represented South Korea at four Pacific-Asia Junior Curling Championships from 2010 to 2013 with his teammates Jang Jin-yeong, Kim San, Seo Min-guk and Kim Woorammiroo. After missing the playoffs in 2010, the team won three consecutive silver medals in 2011, 2012 and 2013.

In 2020, Jeong Yeong-seok skipped his Gyeonggi-do Curling Federation team to victory at the 2020 Korean Curling Championships. This earned the team the right to represent South Korea at the 2021 World Men's Curling Championship in Calgary, Alberta. For the championship, the team altered their lineup, bringing Kim in play third on the team. At the Worlds, they finished with a 2–11 record.

== Personal life ==
Kim is a full-time curler.

== Teams ==
Season	Skip	Third	Second	Lead	Alternate
2009–10	Kim Jeong-min	Jang Jin-yeong	Kim San	Seo Min-guk	Kim Woorammiroo
2010–11	Kim Jeong-min	Jang Jin-yeong	Kim San	Seo Min-guk	Kim Woorammiroo
2011–12	Kim Jeong-min	Jang Jin-yeong	Kim San	Seo Min-guk	Kim Woorammiroo
2012–13	Kim Jeong-min	Kim San	Kim Woorammiroo	Seo Min-guk	Jang Jin-yeong
2018–19	Park Jong-duk	Nam Yoon-ho	Yoo Min-hyeon	Kim Jeong-min	
2019–20	Park Jong-duk	Nam Yoon-ho	Yoo Min-hyeon	Kim Jeong-min	
2020–21	Park Jong-duk	Seo Min-guk	Kim Jeong-min	Oh Seung-hoon	
2020–21	Jeong Yeong-seok	Park Se-won	Kim Jeong-min	Lee Jun-hyung	Seo Min-guk
2021–22	Jeong Yeong-seok	Kim Jeong-min	Park Se-won	Lee Jun-hyung	Seo Min-guk
2022–23	Kim Jeong-min	Kim San	Choi Chi-won	Park Se-won	Kwon Dong-keun
2024–25	Jeong Byeong-jin	Lee Jeong-jae	Kim Min-woo	Kim Jeong-min	
2025–26	Lee Jae-beom	Lee Ki-jeong	Kim Min-woo	Kim Jeong-min	
