= Jeong Yeong-seok =

South Korean curler (born 1995)

- Curler
- Born: April 14, 1995 (age 31); Uijeongbu, Gyeonggi-do, South Korea

Team
- Curling club: Uijeongbu CC, Uijeongbu, KOR
- Skip: Park Jong-duk
- Third: Jeong Yeong-seok
- Second: Oh Seung-hoon
- Lead: Lee Ki-bok
- Alternate: Seong Ji-hoon
- Mixed doubles partner: Kim Seon-yeong

Curling career
- Member Association: South Korea
- World Championship: 2 (2021, 2024)
- World Mixed Doubles Championship: 1 (2026)
- Pan Continental Championship: 1 (2023)
- Olympic: 1 (2026)
Medal record
Men's curling
Representing South Korea
Pan Continental Championships
Silver medal – second place	2023 Kelowna
Pacific-Asia Junior Championships
Silver medal – second place	2014 Harbin
Representing Gyeonggi
Korean Men's Championship
Gold medal – first place	2020 Gangneung
Bronze medal – third place	2019 Gangneung
Bronze medal – third place	2021 Gangneung
Representing Gangwon
Korean Men's Championship
Gold medal – first place	2023 Gangneung
Silver medal – second place	2024 Uijeongbu
Bronze medal – third place	2022 Jincheon
Bronze medal – third place	2026 Uiseong
Korean Mixed Doubles Championship
Gold medal – first place	2025 Jincheon
Bronze medal – third place	2022 Jincheon
Bronze medal – third place	2023 Uijeongbu

Jeong Yeong-seok (born April 14, 1995) is a South Korean curler from Uijeongbu, Gyeonggi-do, South Korea. He currently plays third on the Gangwon Provincial Office curling team skipped by Park Jong-duk. While playing for the Gyeonggi-do Curling Federation, he skipped his team to victory at the 2020 Korean Curling Championships and later represented South Korea at the 2021 World Men's Curling Championship.

== Career ==
Jeong represented South Korea at the 2014 Pacific-Asia Junior Curling Championships with his team of Kim Seung-min, Oh Seung-hoon, Park Se-won and Noh Chang-hyun. After going 6–2 through the round robin, the team lost to China's Wang Jinbo in the final 8–6, missing out on qualifying for the 2014 World Junior Curling Championships.

In 2020, Jeong skipped his team of Kim San, Park Se-won, Lee Jun-hyung and Kim Seung-min to victory at the 2020 Korean Curling Championships. After losing the 1 vs. 2 page playoff game, his team defeated Kim Soo-hyuk 8–7 in the semifinal and upset defending champions Kim Chang-min 12–10 in the final. Their win earned them the right to represent South Korea at the 2021 World Men's Curling Championship in Calgary, Alberta. For the championship, the team altered their lineup, bringing Kim Jeong-min and Seo Min-guk in to replace Kim San and Kim Seung-min. At the Worlds, they finished with a 2–11 record.

Jeong represented South Korea at the 2026 Winter Olympics alongside Kim Seon-yeong in the mixed doubles tournament. They lost their first five matches before defeating the American, Estonian, and Canadian teams. They were ultimately eliminated from the mixed doubles curling tournament.

== Teams ==
Season	Skip	Third	Second	Lead	Alternate
2013–14	Kim Seung-min (Fourth)	Jeong Yeong-seok (Skip)	Oh Seung-hoon	Park Se-won	Noh Chang-hyun
2014–15	Kim Seung-min (Fourth)	Jeong Yeong-seok (Skip)	Oh Seung-hoon	Park Se-won	Noh Chang-hyun
2019–20	Jeong Yeong-seok	Kim Seung-min	Oh Seung-hoon	Park Se-won	Jeong Min-seok
2020–21	Jeong Yeong-seok	Kim San	Park Se-won	Lee Jun-hyung	Kim Seung-min
2020–21	Jeong Yeong-seok	Park Se-won	Kim Jeong-min	Lee Jun-hyung	Seo Min-guk
2021–22	Jeong Yeong-seok	Kim Jeong-min	Park Se-won	Lee Jun-hyung	Seo Min-guk
2022–23	Jeong Yeong-seok	Park Jong-duk	Oh Seung-hoon	Seong Ji-hoon	
2023–24	Park Jong-duk	Jeong Yeong-seok	Oh Seung-hoon	Seong Ji-hoon	Lee Ki-bok
2024–25	Park Jong-duk	Jeong Yeong-seok	Oh Seung-hoon	Lee Ki-bok	Seong Ji-hoon
2025–26	Park Jong-duk	Jeong Yeong-seok	Oh Seung-hoon	Lee Ki-bok	Seong Ji-hoon
