= Moon Si-woo =

South Korean curler (born 2002)

- Curler
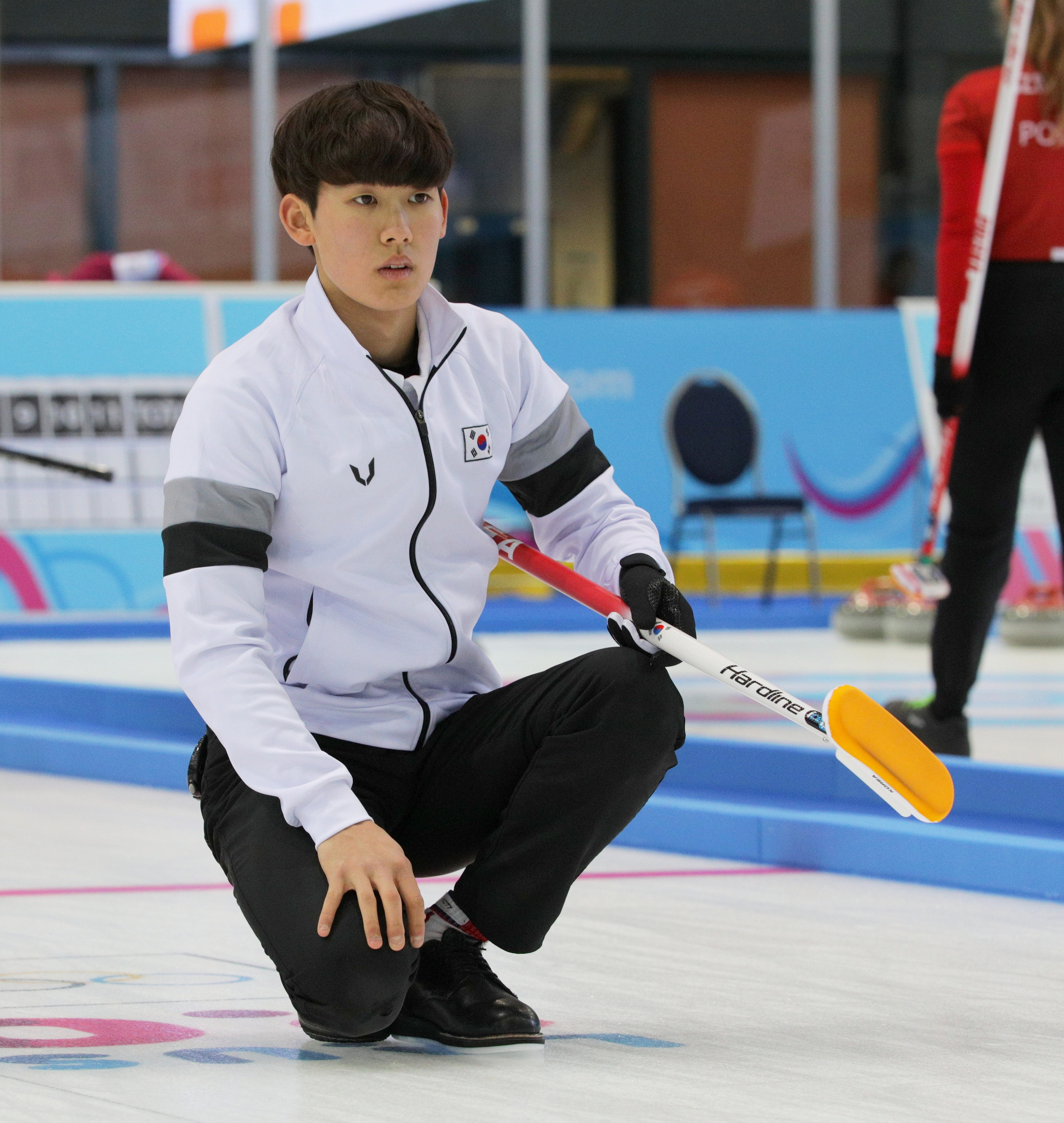
- Moon at the 2020 Winter Youth Olympics
- Born: July 7, 2002 (age 24); Uijeongbu, South Korea

Team
- Curling club: Uijeongbu CC, Uijeongbu
- Skip: Kim Hak-jun
- Third: Moon Si-woo
- Second: Park Jin-hwan
- Lead: Kim Myeong-jun
- Alternate: Park Jong-hyeon
- Mixed doubles partner: Kim Min-seo

Curling career
- Member Association: South Korea
- World Mixed Doubles Championship: 1 (2021)
Medal record
Representing Gyeonggi
Korean Mixed Doubles Championship
Bronze medal – third place	2020 Gangneung

Moon Si-woo (born July 7, 2002) is a South Korean curler from Uijeongbu. In 2021, he represented South Korea at the 2021 World Mixed Doubles Curling Championship alongside Kim Ji-yoon.

== Career ==
While attending Uijeongbu High School, Moon competed in the 2018 and 2019 Korean Curling Championships as third and second respectively. In both years, his teams managed to qualify for the playoffs before losing in the 3 vs. 4 page playoff and bronze medal games, finishing in fourth place overall.

In 2020, Moon competed in the 2020 Winter Youth Olympics with teammates Park Sang-woo, Park You-been and Kim Ji-yoon. In the mixed team competition, the team finished with a 3–2 record, narrowly missing the playoffs following losses to Canada and Russia. The next week, he played in the mixed doubles event with Czech Republic's Zuzana Pražáková. The pair lost their first game and were eliminated in the round of 48.

During the 2020–21 season, Moon and his mixed doubles partner Kim Ji-yoon finished third at the 2020 Korean Mixed Doubles Championship. Later in the season, the pair won the qualification event for the right to represent South Korea at the 2021 World Mixed Doubles Curling Championship. The duo, both eighteen at the time, defeated 2018 Olympian Jang Hye-ji and her partner Seong Yu-jin 2–0 in the best-of-three series. At the World Championship in Aberdeen, Scotland, Moon and Kim finished ninth in their pool with a 3–6 record, forcing them to play a relegation game to retain Korea's berth in the championship. Facing Japan's Yurika Yoshida and Yuta Matsumura, the Korean pair lost 8–6, relegating Korea to the 2021 Qualification Event. At the 2021 Korean Mixed Doubles Curling Championship, which doubled as the Olympic Trials for the 2022 Winter Olympics, Moon and Kim finished in fourth place, failing to defend their spot as the national mixed doubles team. Their team dissolved following the championship, with Kim moving to Seoul to compete with Jeong Byeong-jin.

== Personal life ==
Moon attended Uijeongbu High School.

== Teams ==
Season	Skip	Third	Second	Lead	Alternate
2018–19	Kwak Sang-hyun	Lee Tae-hyuk	Moon Si-woo	Park Sang-woo	Choi Jae-hyeok
2019–20	Park Sang-woo	Moon Si-woo	Choi Jae-hyeok	Seo Ji-hun	
2025–26	Kim Hak-jun	Moon Si-woo	Park Jin-hwan	Kim Myeong-jun	Park Jong-hyeon
