= 2014 Pacific-Asia Junior Curling Championships =

- Host city: Harbin, China
- Arena: Heilongjiang Skating Gym
- Dates: January 8–14
- Men's winner: China
- Skip: Wang Jinbo
- Third: Ling Zhi
- Second: Zhang Tianyu
- Lead: Shao Zhilin
- Alternate: Liang Shuming
- Finalist: South Korea (Jeong Yeong-seok)
- Women's winner: South Korea
- Skip: Kim Kyeong-ae
- Third: Kim Seon-yeong
- Second: Kim Ji-hyeon
- Lead: Koo Young-eun
- Alternate: Oh Eun-jin
- Finalist: China (Jiang Yilun)

The 2014 Pacific-Asia Junior Curling Championships was held from January 8 to 14 in Harbin, China. The top finishers of each tournament advanced to the 2014 World Junior Curling Championships in Flims, Switzerland.

== Men ==
=== Teams ===
Country	Skip	Third	Second	Lead	Alternate
Australia	Max Thomas	Dean Hewitt	Mitchell Thomas	Grant Hamsey	
China	Wang Jinbo	Ling Zhi	Zhang Tianyu	Shao Zhilin	Liang Shuming
Japan	Yasumasa Tanida	Yuuya Takigahira	Shingo Usui	Kazuki Yoshikawa	Ryuji Shibaya
New Zealand	Willie Miller	Garion Long	Liam Dowling	Luke Steele	Simon Neilson
South Korea	Kim Seung-min (fourth)	Jeong Yeong-seok (skip)	Oh Seung-hoon	Park Se-won	Noh Chang-hyun

=== Round Robin Standings ===
Final Round Robin Standings

Key
Teams to Playoffs

Country	Skip	W	L
South Korea	Jeong Yeong-seok	6	2
China	Wang Jinbo	5	3
New Zealand	Willie Miller	5	3
Japan	Yasumasa Tanida	4	4
Australia	Max Thomas	0	8

=== Round Robin Results ===
All draw times are listed in Chinese Standard Time (UTC+8).

==== Draw 1 ====
Thursday, January 9, 10:00

Sheet A	1	2	3	4	5	6	7	8	9	10	Final
South Korea (Jeong)	2	0	1	0	2	0	1	0	2	X	8
Australia (Thomas) 🔨	0	0	0	1	0	1	0	1	0	X	3

Sheet B	1	2	3	4	5	6	7	8	9	10	Final
Japan (Tanida)	0	2	1	0	0	0	1	0	0	X	4
China (Wang) 🔨	1	0	0	0	1	1	0	5	0	X	8

==== Draw 2 ====
Thursday, January 9, 16:00

Sheet C	1	2	3	4	5	6	7	8	9	10	Final
China (Wang)	0	2	0	2	0	0	0	0	X	X	4
South Korea (Jeong) 🔨	2	0	1	0	1	2	1	2	X	X	9

Sheet D	1	2	3	4	5	6	7	8	9	10	Final
New Zealand (Miller)	0	1	0	0	2	1	3	2	1	X	10
Japan (Tanida) 🔨	2	0	1	1	0	0	0	0	0	X	4

==== Draw 3 ====
Friday, January 10, 10:00

Sheet A	1	2	3	4	5	6	7	8	9	10	Final
New Zealand (Miller)	2	2	0	0	2	2	0	2	X	X	10
China (Wang) 🔨	0	0	0	2	0	0	2	0	X	X	4

Sheet C	1	2	3	4	5	6	7	8	9	10	Final
Japan (Tanida)	2	0	1	0	4	1	0	2	0	X	10
Australia (Thomas) 🔨	0	1	0	2	0	0	2	0	1	X	6

==== Draw 4 ====
Friday, January 10, 16:00

Sheet B	1	2	3	4	5	6	7	8	9	10	Final
South Korea (Jeong)	1	0	1	0	3	1	0	0	0	1	7
New Zealand (Miller) 🔨	0	1	0	1	0	0	4	1	1	0	8

Sheet D	1	2	3	4	5	6	7	8	9	10	Final
Australia (Thomas)	1	0	1	0	1	1	0	0	X	X	4
China (Wang) 🔨	0	3	0	3	0	0	1	4	X	X	11

==== Draw 5 ====
Saturday, January 11, 10:00

Sheet A	1	2	3	4	5	6	7	8	9	10	Final
Australia (Thomas)	0	3	0	0	1	0	X	X	X	X	4
New Zealand (Miller) 🔨	6	0	3	1	0	6	X	X	X	X	16

Sheet C	1	2	3	4	5	6	7	8	9	10	Final
South Korea (Jeong)	0	3	1	0	0	0	2	0	0	0	6
Japan (Tanida) 🔨	2	0	0	0	0	1	0	1	1	0	5

==== Draw 6 ====
Saturday, January 11, 16:00

Sheet A	1	2	3	4	5	6	7	8	9	10	Final
China (Wang)	0	1	0	2	0	2	0	0	1	2	8
Japan (Tanida) 🔨	1	0	0	0	1	0	1	1	0	0	4

Sheet B	1	2	3	4	5	6	7	8	9	10	Final
Australia (Thomas)	1	1	0	1	0	1	0	1	0	X	5
South Korea (Jeong) 🔨	0	0	2	0	2	0	2	0	4	X	10

==== Draw 7 ====
Sunday, January 12, 10:00

Sheet B	1	2	3	4	5	6	7	8	9	10	Final
New Zealand (Miller) 🔨	2	0	0	0	0	1	1	0	X	X	4
Japan (Tanida)	0	2	1	1	4	0	0	2	X	X	10

Sheet D	1	2	3	4	5	6	7	8	9	10	11	Final
China (Wang) 🔨	1	2	1	0	0	0	0	1	0	1	0	6
South Korea (Jeong)	0	0	0	2	0	2	1	0	1	0	1	7

==== Draw 8 ====
Sunday, January 12, 16:00

Sheet C	1	2	3	4	5	6	7	8	9	10	Final
New Zealand (Miller) 🔨	1	0	1	0	2	0	1	0	0	0	5
China (Wang)	0	1	0	2	0	2	0	1	0	1	7

Sheet D	1	2	3	4	5	6	7	8	9	10	Final
Japan (Tanida) 🔨	2	0	0	1	3	0	3	1	X	X	10
Australia (Thomas)	0	0	2	0	0	1	0	0	X	X	3

==== Draw 9 ====
Monday, January 13, 9:00

Sheet B	1	2	3	4	5	6	7	8	9	10	Final
China (Wang)	0	2	1	2	1	0	3	X	X	X	9
Australia (Thomas) 🔨	1	0	0	0	0	1	0	X	X	X	2

Sheet D	1	2	3	4	5	6	7	8	9	10	Final
South Korea (Jeong) 🔨	1	0	2	1	3	1	3	X	X	X	11
New Zealand (Miller)	0	1	0	0	0	0	0	X	X	X	1

==== Draw 10 ====
Monday, January 13, 14:30

Sheet A	1	2	3	4	5	6	7	8	9	10	Final
Japan (Tanida)	0	1	0	0	2	0	1	2	0	2	8
South Korea (Jeong) 🔨	1	0	3	1	0	1	0	0	1	0	7

Sheet C	1	2	3	4	5	6	7	8	9	10	Final
Australia (Thomas) 🔨	2	0	0	1	1	0	3	0	1	X	8
New Zealand (Miller)	0	2	4	0	0	4	0	3	0	X	13

=== Playoffs ===
Semifinal			Final
			1	South Korea	6
2	China	9	2	China	8
3	New Zealand	3

==== Semifinal ====
Tuesday, January 14, 9:00

Sheet C	1	2	3	4	5	6	7	8	9	10	Final
China (Wang) 🔨	0	1	0	2	0	0	4	2	X	X	9
New Zealand (Miller)	0	0	2	0	1	0	0	0	X	X	3

==== Final ====
Tuesday, January 14, 14:30

Sheet A	1	2	3	4	5	6	7	8	9	10	Final
South Korea (Jeong) 🔨	1	0	0	2	0	1	1	0	1	0	6
China (Wang)	0	2	1	0	2	0	0	2	0	1	8

== Women ==
=== Teams ===
Country	Skip	Third	Second	Lead	Alternate
Australia	Victoria Wilson	Tahli Gill	Samantha Jeffs	Kirby Gill	Ivy Militano
China	Jiang Yilun	Wang Rui	Zhao Xiyang	Yao Mingyue	She Qiutong
Japan	Mayu Minami	Mizuki Kitaguchi	Mayu Natsuizaka	Mari Ikawa	Kotomi Mochizuki
New Zealand	Eleanor Adviento	Tessa Farley	Holly Thompson	Jessica Smith	Waverly Taylor
South Korea	Kim Kyeong-ae	Kim Seon-yeong	Kim Ji-hyeon	Koo Young-eun	Oh Eun-jin

=== Round Robin Standings ===
Final Round Robin Standings

Key
Teams to Playoffs

Country	Skip	W	L
South Korea	Kim Kyeong-ae	8	0
China	Jiang Yilun	5	3
Japan	Mayu Minami	5	3
Australia	Victoria Wilson	1	7
New Zealand	Eleanor Adviento	1	7

=== Round Robin Results ===
All draw times are listed in Chinese Standard Time (UTC+8).

==== Draw 1 ====
Thursday, January 9, 10:00

Sheet C	1	2	3	4	5	6	7	8	9	10	Final
New Zealand (Adviento)	0	0	0	0	0	0	1	0	X	X	1
South Korea (Kim) 🔨	2	0	1	0	3	2	0	2	X	X	10

Sheet D	1	2	3	4	5	6	7	8	9	10	Final
Australia (Wilson)	0	1	0	0	0	3	0	X	X	X	4
China (Jiang) 🔨	3	0	5	1	3	0	2	X	X	X	14

==== Draw 2 ====
Thursday, January 9, 16:00

Sheet A	1	2	3	4	5	6	7	8	9	10	Final
Japan (Minami)	0	1	3	0	2	4	0	0	5	X	15
New Zealand (Adviento) 🔨	0	0	0	1	0	0	0	1	0	X	2

Sheet B	1	2	3	4	5	6	7	8	9	10	Final
South Korea (Kim)	2	3	1	2	1	1	X	X	X	X	10
Australia (Wilson) 🔨	0	0	0	0	0	0	X	X	X	X	0

==== Draw 3 ====
Friday, January 10, 10:00

Sheet B	1	2	3	4	5	6	7	8	9	10	Final
New Zealand (Adviento)	0	1	0	0	2	0	1	0	1	X	5
China (Jiang) 🔨	3	0	2	2	0	2	0	2	0	X	11

Sheet D	1	2	3	4	5	6	7	8	9	10	Final
Japan (Minami)	0	1	1	1	0	0	0	1	0	X	4
South Korea (Kim) 🔨	2	0	0	0	2	3	1	0	1	X	9

==== Draw 4 ====
Friday, January 10, 16:00

Sheet A	1	2	3	4	5	6	7	8	9	10	Final
China (Jiang)	0	1	0	1	0	1	0	1	0	X	4
South Korea (Kim) 🔨	1	0	2	0	1	0	3	0	1	X	8

Sheet C	1	2	3	4	5	6	7	8	9	10	Final
Australia (Wilson)	0	0	0	0	0	1	0	X	X	X	1
Japan (Minami) 🔨	3	1	2	2	3	0	6	X	X	X	17

==== Draw 5 ====
Saturday, January 11, 10:00

Sheet B	1	2	3	4	5	6	7	8	9	10	Final
Australia (Wilson)	1	1	2	0	3	1	1	0	0	X	9
New Zealand (Adviento) 🔨	0	0	0	1	0	0	0	3	1	X	5

Sheet D	1	2	3	4	5	6	7	8	9	10	11	Final
China (Jiang)	1	0	1	1	0	2	2	0	0	0	0	7
Japan (Minami) 🔨	0	1	0	0	1	0	0	2	2	1	1	8

==== Draw 6 ====
Saturday, January 11, 16:00

Sheet C	1	2	3	4	5	6	7	8	9	10	Final
China (Jiang)	2	3	2	1	2	1	1	X	X	X	12
Australia (Wilson) 🔨	0	0	0	0	0	0	0	X	X	X	0

Sheet D	1	2	3	4	5	6	7	8	9	10	Final
South Korea (Kim)	0	4	0	0	1	3	0	3	X	X	11
New Zealand (Adviento) 🔨	1	0	1	0	0	0	1	0	X	X	3

==== Draw 7 ====
Sunday, January 12, 10:00

Sheet A	1	2	3	4	5	6	7	8	9	10	Final
South Korea (Kim) 🔨	4	0	2	4	3	3	X	X	X	X	16
Australia (Wilson)	0	2	0	0	0	0	X	X	X	X	2

Sheet C	1	2	3	4	5	6	7	8	9	10	Final
Japan (Minami) 🔨	4	0	2	0	1	2	0	1	0	X	10
New Zealand (Adviento)	0	3	0	1	0	0	1	0	1	X	6

==== Draw 8 ====
Sunday, January 12, 16:00

Sheet A	Final
New Zealand (Adviento) 🔨	L
China (Jiang)	W

Sheet B	1	2	3	4	5	6	7	8	9	10	Final
Japan (Minami) 🔨	0	0	2	0	0	0	1	0	X	X	3
South Korea (Kim)	0	1	0	4	0	1	0	3	X	X	9

==== Draw 9 ====
Monday, January 13, 9:00

Sheet A	1	2	3	4	5	6	7	8	9	10	Final
Australia (Wilson) 🔨	0	0	3	1	0	2	0	X	X	X	6
Japan (Minami)	2	1	0	0	3	0	5	X	X	X	11

Sheet C	1	2	3	4	5	6	7	8	9	10	Final
South Korea (Kim)	0	3	2	0	1	0	3	0	X	X	9
China (Jiang) 🔨	2	0	0	1	0	1	0	1	X	X	5

==== Draw 10 ====
Monday, January 13, 14:30

Sheet B	1	2	3	4	5	6	7	8	9	10	Final
China (Jiang) 🔨	1	0	1	0	1	0	1	1	0	2	7
Japan (Minami)	0	1	0	2	0	1	0	0	1	0	5

Sheet D	1	2	3	4	5	6	7	8	9	10	Final
New Zealand (Adviento)	0	1	1	0	2	0	0	1	0	3	8
Australia (Wilson) 🔨	1	0	0	1	0	1	3	0	1	0	7

=== Playoffs ===
Semifinal			Final
			1	South Korea	11
2	China	6	2	China	6
3	Japan	3

==== Semifinal ====
Tuesday, January 14, 9:00

Sheet B	1	2	3	4	5	6	7	8	9	10	Final
China (Jiang) 🔨	2	0	0	1	2	0	0	1	0	X	6
Japan (Minami)	0	0	1	0	0	1	0	0	1	X	3

==== Final ====
Tuesday, January 14, 14:30

Sheet D	1	2	3	4	5	6	7	8	9	10	Final
South Korea (Kim) 🔨	2	0	1	0	2	0	1	2	3	X	11
China (Jiang)	0	2	0	3	0	1	0	0	0	X	6
