= Lee Jun-hyung =

South Korean curler

- Curler
- Born: March 9, 1997 (age 29); Gyeonggi-do, South Korea

Team
- Curling club: Uijeongbu CC, Uijeongbu, KOR

Curling career
- Member Association: South Korea
- World Championship: 1 (2021)
Medal record
Representing Gyeonggi
Korean Men's Championship
Gold medal – first place	2020 Gangneung
Bronze medal – third place	2021 Gangneung
Korean Mixed Doubles Championship
Bronze medal – third place	2016 Uiseong

Lee Jun-hyung (born March 9, 1997) is a South Korean curler from Uijeongbu, Gyeonggi-do, South Korea. While playing lead for Jeong Yeong-seok, his team won the 2020 Korean Curling Championships and later represented North Korea at the 2021 World Men's Curling Championship.

== Career ==
In 2019, Lee and his team of Jeong Yeong-seok, Kim San, Park Se-won and Kim Seung-min won the 2020 Korean Curling Championships. After losing the 1 vs. 2 page playoff game, his team defeated Kim Soo-hyuk 8–7 in the semifinal and upset defending champions Kim Chang-min 12–10 in the final. Their win earned them the right to represent South Korea at the 2021 World Men's Curling Championship in Calgary, Alberta. For the championship, the team altered their lineup, bringing Kim Jeong-min and Seo Min-guk in to replace Kim San and Kim Seung-min. At the Worlds, they finished with a 2–11 record.

== Personal life ==
Lee is a full-time curler.

== Teams ==
Season	Skip	Third	Second	Lead	Alternate
2020–21	Jeong Yeong-seok	Kim San	Park Se-won	Lee Jun-hyung	Kim Seung-min
2020–21	Jeong Yeong-seok	Park Se-won	Kim Jeong-min	Lee Jun-hyung	Seo Min-guk
2021–22	Jeong Yeong-seok	Kim Jeong-min	Park Se-won	Lee Jun-hyung	Seo Min-guk
