= Pacific-Asia Junior Curling Championships =

Regional athletic contest

The Pacific-Asia Junior Curling Championships (formerly known as the Pacific Junior Curling Championships) was an annual curling bonspiel held in the World Curling Federation's Pacific zone. The championships featured curlers under the age of 21 competing to qualify for a spot in the World Junior Curling Championships. Australia, China, Japan, New Zealand, and South Korea have participated in past championships. Replacing the European Junior Curling Challenge and the Pacific-Asia Junior Curling Championships in 2016, the World Junior B Curling Championships will now serve as the qualifier for the World Junior Curling Championships.

== Medals ==
=== Men ===
Rank	Nation	Gold	Silver	Bronze	Total
1	China (CHN)	9	1	1	11
2	South Korea (KOR)	2	6	2	10
3	Japan (JPN)	0	4	4	8
4	New Zealand (NZL)	0	0	4	4
Totals (4 entries)		11	11	11	33

=== Women ===
Rank	Nation	Gold	Silver	Bronze	Total
1	Japan (JPN)	5	2	2	9
2	China (CHN)	4	5	1	10
3	South Korea (KOR)	2	4	5	11
4	New Zealand (NZL)	0	0	3	3
Totals (4 entries)		11	11	11	33

== Summary ==
=== Men ===
Year	Location	Final			Third Place
Year	Location	Champion	Score	Second Place	Third Place
2005	(Japan) Tokoro	South Korea	6–4	Japan	China
2006	(China) Beijing	China	9–4	Japan	South Korea
2007	(New Zealand) Naseby	China	8–6	South Korea	Japan
2008	(South Korea) Jeonju	China	6–3	Japan	South Korea
2009	(China) Harbin	China	7–3	South Korea	New Zealand
2010	(Japan) Nayoro	China	3–2	Japan	New Zealand
2011	(New Zealand) Naseby	China	8–3	South Korea	Japan
2012	(South Korea) Jeonju	China	3–2	South Korea	Japan
2013	(Japan) Tokoro	China	7–3	South Korea	New Zealand
2014	(China) Harbin	China	8–6	South Korea	New Zealand
2015	(New Zealand) Naseby	South Korea	5-4	China	Japan

=== Women ===
Year	Location	Final			Third Place
Year	Location	Champion	Score	Second Place	Third Place
2005	(Japan) Tokoro	China	7–1	Japan	South Korea
2006	(China) Beijing	China	10–2	Japan	South Korea
2007	(New Zealand) Naseby	China	5–2	South Korea	New Zealand
2008	(South Korea) Jeonju	Japan	9–7	China	South Korea
2009	(China) Harbin	Japan	7–5	China	South Korea
2010	(Japan) Nayoro	China	4–3	South Korea	Japan
2011	(New Zealand) Naseby	Japan	4–3	South Korea	New Zealand
2012	(South Korea) Jeonju	Japan	3–2	South Korea	China
2013	(Japan) Tokoro	Japan	7–4	China	South Korea
2014	(China) Harbin	South Korea	11–6	China	Japan
2015	(New Zealand) Naseby	South Korea	5-4	China	New Zealand
