= Yeom Yoon-jung =

South Korean curler

- Curler
- Born: South Korea

Team
- Curling club: Gyeonggi-do CC, Uijeongbu

Curling career
- Member Association: South Korea
- World Championship: 1 (2016)
- Pacific-Asia Championship: 1 (2015)
Medal record
Women's curling
Representing South Korea
Pacific-Asia Championships
Silver medal – second place	2015 Almaty
Pacific-Asia Junior Championships
Bronze medal – third place	2009 Harbin
Representing Gyeonggi
Korean Women's Championship
Gold medal – first place	2015 Icheon
Bronze medal – third place	2016 Uiseong
Bronze medal – third place	2017 Icheon

Yeom Yoon-jung is a South Korean curler. She was the alternate on the South Korean National Women's Curling Team from 2015–16.

== Career ==
Yeom played second for Gim Un-chi at the 2009 Pacific-Asia Junior Curling Championships where the team won a bronze medal. She joined the Kim Ji-sun rink as their alternate in 2014 with Gim throwing fourth stones, Um Min-ji at third, Lee Seul-bee at second and Ji-sun skipping the team but throwing the lead rocks. They won the 2015 South Korean National Curling Championships and were the South Korean National Women's Curling Team for the 2015–16 season. They lost the final of the 2015 Pacific-Asia Curling Championships to Japan's Satsuki Fujisawa. This meant they qualified South Korea for the 2016 World Women's Curling Championship, Yeom's first. The team surprised many by defeating higher-ranked teams Sweden and Canada. They finished the week in seventh place with a 5–6 record. The team lost the semifinal of the 2016 Korean Nationals in April 2016 and would lose their title of the national team to the Kim Eun-jung rink. Kim stepped back from competitive curling after the event and Yeom was moved to lead on the team. After the team didn't win the 2017 Nationals, Yeom stepped back from competitive curling.

== Teams ==
Season	Skip	Third	Second	Lead	Alternate
2014–15	Gim Un-chi (fourth)	Um Min-ji	Lee Seul-bee	Kim Ji-sun (skip)	Yeom Yoon-jung
2015–16	Gim Un-chi (fourth)	Um Min-ji	Lee Seul-bee	Kim Ji-sun (skip)	Yeom Yoon-jung
2016–17	Gim Un-chi	Um Min-ji	Lee Seul-bee	Yeom Yoon-jung	Seol Ye-eun
2017–18	Gim Un-chi	Um Min-ji	Seol Ye-eun	Yeom Yoon-jung	Lee Seul-bee
