= 2019 Korean Curling Championships =

2019 KB Financial Korean Curling Championships
- Host city: Gangneung, South Korea
- Arena: Gangneung Curling Centre
- Dates: July 6–11
- Men's winner: Gyeongbuk Athletic Association
- Curling club: Uiseong CC, Uiseong
- Skip: Kim Chang-min
- Third: Lee Ki-jeong
- Second: Kim Hak-kyun
- Lead: Lee Ki-bok
- Coach: Lim Myung-sup
- Finalist: Seoul City Hall (Kim)
- Women's winner: Gyeonggi Province
- Curling club: Uijeongbu CC, Uijeongbu
- Skip: Gim Un-chi
- Third: Um Min-ji
- Second: Kim Su-ji
- Lead: Seol Ye-eun
- Alternate: Seol Ye-ji
- Coach: Shin Dong-ho
- Finalist: Chuncheon City Hall (Kim)

The 2019 Korean Curling Championships (branded as the 2019 KB Financial Korean Curling Championships), Korea's national curling championships, were held from July 6 to 11 at the Gangneung Curling Centre in Gangneung, South Korea. The winning teams on both the men's and women's sides became the Korean National Teams for the 2019–20 curling season. They represented Korea at the 2019 Pacific-Asia Curling Championships and were scheduled to compete in the 2020 World Men's Curling Championship and the 2020 World Women's Curling Championship before they got cancelled due to the COVID-19 pandemic. Both the men's and women's events were played in a round robin format which qualified four teams for the playoffs.

== Medalists ==
	Gold	Silver	Bronze
Men	Gyeongbuk Athletic Association; Kim Chang-min; Lee Ki-jeong; Kim Hak-kyun; Lee Ki-bok	Seoul City Hall; Kim Soo-hyuk; Lee Jeong-jae; Jeong Byeong-jin; Hwang Hyeon-jun; Lee Dong-hyeong	Gyeonggido Curling Federation; Jeong Yeong-seok; Kim Seung-min; Oh Seung-hoon; Park Se-won; Jeong Min-seok
Women	Gyeonggi Province; Gim Un-chi; Um Min-ji; Kim Su-ji; Seol Ye-eun; Seol Ye-ji	Chuncheon City Hall; Kim Min-ji; Ha Seung-youn; Kim Hye-rin; Kim Su-jin; Yang Tae-i	Gyeongbuk Athletic Association; Kim Kyeong-ae; Kim Cho-hi; Kim Seon-yeong; Kim Yeong-mi; Kim Eun-jung

== Men ==
=== Teams ===
The teams are listed as follows:

Team	Skip	Third	Second	Lead	Alternate	Locale
Busan Curling Federation	Lee Jin-wook	Kim Min-kyu	Choi Woo-yeong	Park Jeong-won	Seong Se-hyeon	Busan
Gyeongbuk Athletic Association	Kim Chang-min	Lee Ki-jeong	Kim Hak-kyun	Lee Ki-bok		Uiseong
Gyeonggido Curling Federation	Jeong Yeong-seok	Kim Seung-min	Oh Seung-hoon	Park Se-won	Jeong Min-seok	Gyeonggi-do
Incheon Curling Federation	Shin Tae-woong (Fourth)	Kim Byeong-chan	Kim Yeong-hyeon	Park Geon-woo (Skip)	Yeom Kyu-man	Incheon
Seoul City Hall	Kim Soo-hyuk	Lee Jeong-jae	Jeong Byeong-jin	Hwang Hyeon-jun	Lee Dong-hyeong	Seoul
Seoul Physical Education High School	Lee Jae-beom	Oh Gyu-nam	Park Yeong-ho	Lee Yoon-woo	Park Jeong-hwan	Seoul
Uijeongbu High School	Park Sang-woo	Moon Si-woo	Choi Jae-hyeok	Seo Ji-hun		Uijeongbu

=== Round robin standings ===
Final Round Robin Standings

Key
Teams to Playoffs

Team	Skip	W	L	W–L	PF	PA	EW	EL	BE	SE	DSC
Gyeongbuk Athletic Association	Kim Chang-min	6	0	–	64	26	29	19	1	8	23.5
Seoul City Hall	Kim Soo-hyuk	5	1	–	48	25	26	18	9	7	36.3
Gyeonggido Curling Federation	Jeong Yeong-seok	4	2	–	49	33	27	20	1	9	64.8
Uijeongbu High School	Park Sang-woo	3	3	–	37	41	21	26	1	5	60.6
Seoul PE High School	Lee Jae-beom	2	4	–	42	39	24	22	3	5	55.5
Busan Curling Federation	Lee Jin-wook	1	5	–	25	64	17	32	3	2	142.1
Incheon Curling Federation	Park Geon-woo	0	6	–	34	71	21	28	4	4	54.4

=== Round robin results ===
All draws are listed in Korea Standard Time (UTC+09:00).

==== Draw 1 ====
Saturday, July 6, 18:00

Sheet A	1	2	3	4	5	6	7	8	9	10	Final
Gyeonggido Curling Federation (Jeong)	2	0	0	1	1	1	2	0	0	X	7
Uijeongbu High School (S. Park) 🔨	0	2	1	0	0	0	0	1	1	X	5

Sheet B	1	2	3	4	5	6	7	8	9	10	Final
Gyeongbuk Athletic Association (C. Kim) 🔨	2	0	4	0	1	1	0	3	0	X	11
Seoul PE High School (J. B. Lee)	0	1	0	1	0	0	2	0	1	X	5

Sheet D	1	2	3	4	5	6	7	8	9	10	Final
Incheon Curling Federation (G. Park) 🔨	3	0	2	0	0	2	0	1	0	1	9
Busan Curling Federation (J. W. Lee)	0	1	0	3	3	0	3	0	0	0	10

==== Draw 2 ====
Sunday, July 7, 9:00

Sheet A	1	2	3	4	5	6	7	8	9	10	Final
Gyeongbuk Athletic Association (C. Kim) 🔨	2	2	0	0	4	1	0	4	X	X	13
Busan Curling Federation (J. W. Lee)	0	0	0	1	0	0	1	0	X	X	2

Sheet B	1	2	3	4	5	6	7	8	9	10	Final
Gyeonggido Curling Federation (Jeong) 🔨	4	1	0	3	0	3	1	1	X	X	13
Incheon Curling Federation (G. Park)	0	0	1	0	0	0	0	0	X	X	1

Sheet D	1	2	3	4	5	6	7	8	9	10	Final
Seoul City Hall (S. Kim) 🔨	0	0	2	0	1	0	2	0	0	1	6
Seoul PE High School (J. B. Lee)	0	0	0	2	0	1	0	2	0	0	5

==== Draw 4 ====
Sunday, July 7, 19:00

Sheet A	1	2	3	4	5	6	7	8	9	10	Final
Busan Curling Federation (J. W. Lee)	0	0	0	0	1	0	0	0	X	X	1
Seoul PE High School (J. B. Lee) 🔨	1	0	1	2	0	2	1	1	X	X	8

Sheet C	1	2	3	4	5	6	7	8	9	10	Final
Seoul City Hall (S. Kim) 🔨	0	2	1	0	1	1	0	4	X	X	9
Uijeongbu High School (S. Park)	0	0	0	1	0	0	1	0	X	X	2

Sheet D	1	2	3	4	5	6	7	8	9	10	Final
Gyeongbuk Athletic Association (C. Kim) 🔨	3	0	2	0	1	0	0	2	0	X	8
Gyeonggido Curling Federation (Jeong)	0	1	0	2	0	1	0	0	2	X	6

==== Draw 6 ====
Monday, July 8, 14:00

Sheet B	1	2	3	4	5	6	7	8	9	10	Final
Seoul City Hall (S. Kim) 🔨	2	1	0	2	4	3	1	0	X	X	13
Busan Curling Federation (J. W. Lee)	0	0	2	0	0	0	0	1	X	X	3

Sheet C	1	2	3	4	5	6	7	8	9	10	11	Final
Gyeonggido Curling Federation (Jeong)	0	0	2	0	1	0	2	0	2	0	1	8
Seoul PE High School (J. B. Lee) 🔨	1	0	0	2	0	2	0	0	0	2	0	7

Sheet D	1	2	3	4	5	6	7	8	9	10	11	Final
Incheon Curling Federation (G. Park) 🔨	0	0	2	0	1	1	0	3	0	2	0	9
Uijeongbu High School (S. Park)	0	0	0	5	0	0	3	0	1	0	3	12

==== Draw 8 ====
Tuesday, July 9, 9:00

Sheet A	1	2	3	4	5	6	7	8	9	10	Final
Seoul City Hall (S. Kim) 🔨	1	0	3	1	0	0	2	0	0	X	7
Incheon Curling Federation (G. Park)	0	1	0	0	1	2	0	0	1	X	5

Sheet B	1	2	3	4	5	6	7	8	9	10	Final
Gyeongbuk Athletic Association (C. Kim) 🔨	2	0	2	2	2	2	0	0	X	X	10
Uijeongbu High School (S. Park)	0	1	0	0	0	0	0	1	X	X	2

Sheet C	1	2	3	4	5	6	7	8	9	10	Final
Gyeonggido Curling Federation (Jeong) 🔨	2	0	1	0	6	0	1	0	3	X	13
Busan Curling Federation (J. W. Lee)	0	1	0	1	0	2	0	1	0	X	5

==== Draw 10 ====
Tuesday, July 9, 19:00

Sheet A	1	2	3	4	5	6	7	8	9	10	Final
Uijeongbu High School (S. Park) 🔨	2	0	0	0	2	0	2	2	X	X	8
Seoul PE High School (J. B. Lee)	0	0	0	1	0	1	0	0	X	X	2

Sheet B	1	2	3	4	5	6	7	8	9	10	Final
Seoul City Hall (S. Kim) 🔨	1	0	0	0	4	0	0	0	2	X	7
Gyeonggido Curling Federation (Jeong)	0	1	0	0	0	1	0	0	0	X	2

Sheet C	1	2	3	4	5	6	7	8	9	10	Final
Gyeongbuk Athletic Association (C. Kim) 🔨	4	0	3	1	0	0	5	1	X	X	14
Incheon Curling Federation (G. Park)	0	1	0	0	1	3	0	0	X	X	5

==== Draw 12 ====
Wednesday, July 10, 14:00

Sheet B	1	2	3	4	5	6	7	8	9	10	Final
Busan Curling Federation (J. W. Lee)	0	1	0	1	1	0	0	0	1	X	4
Uijeongbu High School (S. Park) 🔨	2	0	2	0	0	1	2	1	0	X	8

Sheet C	1	2	3	4	5	6	7	8	9	10	Final
Incheon Curling Federation (G. Park)	0	2	0	0	2	0	1	0	X	X	5
Seoul PE High School (J. B. Lee) 🔨	5	0	4	2	0	2	0	2	X	X	15

Sheet D	1	2	3	4	5	6	7	8	9	10	Final
Seoul City Hall (S. Kim)	0	0	1	0	1	0	2	0	2	0	6
Gyeongbuk Athletic Association (C. Kim) 🔨	1	0	0	2	0	2	0	2	0	1	8

=== Playoffs ===
Page playoff system
1	Gyeongbuk Athletic Association	9
2	Seoul City Hall	2
3	Gyeonggido Curling Federation	10
4	Uijeongbu High School	4

Semifinal
2	Seoul City Hall	9
3	Gyeonggido Curling Federation	3

Final
1	Gyeongbuk Athletic Association	7
2	Seoul City Hall	6
Third place
3	Gyeonggido Curling Federation	8
4	Uijeongbu High School	7

==== 1 vs. 2 ====
Wednesday, July 10, 19:00

Sheet B	1	2	3	4	5	6	7	8	9	10	Final
Gyeongbuk Athletic Association (C. Kim) 🔨	0	0	3	0	0	2	2	2	X	X	9
Seoul City Hall (S. Kim)	0	1	0	1	0	0	0	0	X	X	2

==== 3 vs. 4 ====
Wednesday, July 10, 19:00

Sheet C	1	2	3	4	5	6	7	8	9	10	Final
Gyeonggido Curling Federation (Jeong) 🔨	2	0	0	3	0	1	0	4	X	X	10
Uijeongbu High School (S. Park)	0	1	0	0	2	0	1	0	X	X	4

==== Semifinal ====
Thursday, July 11, 9:00

Sheet A	1	2	3	4	5	6	7	8	9	10	Final
Seoul City Hall (S. Kim) 🔨	0	3	1	0	4	0	1	0	X	X	9
Gyeonggido Curling Federation (Jeong)	0	0	0	1	0	1	0	1	X	X	3

==== Bronze medal game ====
Thursday, July 11, 19:00

Sheet B	1	2	3	4	5	6	7	8	9	10	Final
Gyeonggido Curling Federation (Jeong) 🔨	1	2	1	0	0	1	0	2	0	1	8
Uijeongbu High School (S. Park)	0	0	0	3	1	0	2	0	1	0	7

==== Gold medal game ====
Thursday, July 11, 19:00

Sheet D	1	2	3	4	5	6	7	8	9	10	11	Final
Gyeongbuk Athletic Association (C. Kim) 🔨	2	0	1	0	1	0	0	0	2	0	1	7
Seoul City Hall (S. Kim)	0	1	0	1	0	0	2	1	0	1	0	6

2019 Korean Curling Championships
(South Korea)
Kim Chang-min
5th Korean Championship title

=== Final standings ===
Place	Team	Skip
1st place, gold medalist(s)	Gyeongbuk Athletic Association	Kim Chang-min
2nd place, silver medalist(s)	Seoul City Hall	Kim Soo-hyuk
3rd place, bronze medalist(s)	Gyeonggido Curling Federation	Jeong Yeong-seok
4	Uijeongbu High School	Park Sang-woo
5	Seoul Physical Education High School	Lee Jae-beom
6	Busan Curling Federation	Lee Jin-wook
7	Incheon Curling Federation	Park Geon-woo

== Women ==
=== Teams ===
The teams are listed as follows:

Team	Skip	Third	Second	Lead	Alternate	Locale
Chuncheon City Hall	Kim Min-ji	Ha Seung-youn	Kim Hye-rin	Kim Su-jin	Yang Tae-i	Chuncheon
Gyeongbuk Athletic Association	Kim Kyeong-ae (Note: As skip Kim Eun-jung was on maternity leave, third Kim Kyeong-ae moved up to skip and alternate Kim Cho-hi played third. Eun-jung was listed as the alternate on the roster, however.)	Kim Cho-hi	Kim Seon-yeong	Kim Yeong-mi	Kim Eun-jung	Uiseong
Gyeonggi Province	Gim Un-chi	Um Min-ji	Kim Su-ji	Seol Ye-eun	Seol Ye-ji	Uijeongbu
Jeonbuk Province	Oh Eun-jin	Jeong Jae-yi	Jeong Yoo-jin	Shin Ga-yeong		Jeonbuk
Jeonju Girls High School	Kim Do-hye	Shin Eun-jin	Kim Se-yeon	Lee Seo-jeong	Cho Su-bin	Jeonju
Songhyun High School B	Park You-been	Kim Ji-yoon	Kang Chae-rin	Lee Soo-hyeon	Kwon Sol	Uijeongbu

=== Round robin standings ===
Final Round Robin Standings

Key
Teams to Playoffs

Team	Skip	W	L	W–L	PF	PA	EW	EL	BE	SE	DSC
Gyeonggi Province	Gim Un-chi	5	0	–	44	20	26	15	1	11	59.3
Chuncheon City Hall	Kim Min-ji	4	1	–	40	20	25	14	4	13	54.3
Gyeongbuk Athletic Association	Kim Kyeong-ae	3	2	–	38	21	23	16	3	9	26.5
Songhyun High School B	Park You-been	2	3	–	33	40	19	22	2	5	104.6
Jeonbuk Province	Oh Eun-jin	1	4	–	26	43	17	25	3	4	109.4
Jeonju Girls High School	Kim Do-hye	0	5	–	15	52	10	28	0	2	129.2

=== Round robin results ===
All draws are listed in Korea Standard Time (UTC+09:00).

==== Draw 3 ====
Sunday, July 7, 14:00

Sheet A	1	2	3	4	5	6	7	8	9	10	Final
Jeonju Girls High School (D. Kim)	0	0	1	0	0	0	0	0	X	X	1
Chuncheon City Hall (M. Kim) 🔨	1	1	0	2	4	1	1	2	X	X	12

Sheet B	1	2	3	4	5	6	7	8	9	10	Final
Gyeongbuk Athletic Association (K. Kim) 🔨	0	1	0	2	1	3	0	3	X	X	10
Jeonbuk Province (Oh)	0	0	1	0	0	0	1	0	X	X	2

Sheet C	1	2	3	4	5	6	7	8	9	10	Final
Gyeonggi Province (Gim)	1	2	1	0	2	0	2	0	X	X	8
Songhyun High School B (Park) 🔨	0	0	0	1	0	1	0	1	X	X	3

==== Draw 5 ====
Monday, July 8, 9:00

Sheet B	1	2	3	4	5	6	7	8	9	10	Final
Songhyun High School B (Park)	0	0	0	1	0	1	0	1	X	X	3
Chuncheon City Hall (M. Kim) 🔨	2	3	1	0	2	0	0	0	X	X	8

Sheet C	1	2	3	4	5	6	7	8	9	10	Final
Jeonbuk Province (Oh) 🔨	0	1	0	0	2	1	0	3	1	X	8
Jeonju Girls High School (D. Kim)	1	0	1	0	0	0	2	0	0	X	4

Sheet D	1	2	3	4	5	6	7	8	9	10	Final
Gyeonggi Province (Gim)	0	1	0	1	2	1	0	3	0	1	9
Gyeongbuk Athletic Association (K. Kim) 🔨	1	0	1	0	0	0	2	0	2	0	6

==== Draw 7 ====
Monday, July 8, 19:00

Sheet A	1	2	3	4	5	6	7	8	9	10	Final
Jeonju Girls High School (D. Kim)	1	0	1	0	0	1	0	0	X	X	3
Gyeonggi Province (Gim) 🔨	0	1	0	4	1	0	2	2	X	X	10

Sheet C	1	2	3	4	5	6	7	8	9	10	Final
Songhyun High School B (Park)	0	0	0	0	0	1	0	2	0	X	3
Gyeongbuk Athletic Association (K. Kim) 🔨	0	2	0	1	1	0	2	0	1	X	7

Sheet D	1	2	3	4	5	6	7	8	9	10	Final
Chuncheon City Hall (M. Kim) 🔨	2	0	1	0	1	2	1	0	1	X	8
Jeonbuk Province (Oh)	0	2	0	1	0	0	0	0	0	X	3

==== Draw 9 ====
Tuesday, July 9, 14:00

Sheet A	1	2	3	4	5	6	7	8	9	10	11	Final
Gyeongbuk Athletic Association (K. Kim) 🔨	3	0	0	0	0	1	0	2	0	0	0	6
Chuncheon City Hall (M. Kim)	0	1	1	1	0	0	2	0	0	1	1	7

Sheet B	1	2	3	4	5	6	7	8	9	10	Final
Jeonbuk Province (Oh)	0	1	0	0	0	1	0	1	0	X	3
Gyeonggi Province (Gim) 🔨	2	0	3	0	2	0	1	0	2	X	10

Sheet D	1	2	3	4	5	6	7	8	9	10	Final
Songhyun High School B (Park)	0	4	0	3	0	0	2	2	2	X	13
Jeonju Girls High School (D. Kim) 🔨	1	0	4	0	2	0	0	0	0	X	7

==== Draw 11 ====
Wednesday, July 10, 9:00

Sheet A	1	2	3	4	5	6	7	8	9	10	11	Final
Jeonbuk Province (Oh)	1	0	4	0	2	1	0	0	2	0	0	10
Songhyun High School B (Park) 🔨	0	1	0	3	0	0	2	1	0	3	1	11

Sheet B	1	2	3	4	5	6	7	8	9	10	Final
Gyeongbuk Athletic Association (K. Kim) 🔨	2	2	1	1	2	1	X	X	X	X	9
Jeonju Girls High School (D. Kim)	0	0	0	0	0	0	X	X	X	X	0

Sheet C	1	2	3	4	5	6	7	8	9	10	Final
Chuncheon City Hall (M. Kim) 🔨	0	0	3	0	0	0	2	0	0	0	5
Gyeonggi Province (Gim)	0	0	0	0	1	1	0	2	2	1	7

=== Playoffs ===
Page playoff system
1	Gyeonggi Province	2
2	Chuncheon City Hall	13
3	Gyeongbuk Athletic Association	11
4	Songhyun High School B	1

Semifinal
1	Gyeonggi Province	7
3	Gyeongbuk Athletic Association	5

Final
2	Chuncheon City Hall	5
1	Gyeonggi Province	6
Third place
3	Gyeongbuk Athletic Association	8
4	Songhyun High School B	3

==== 1 vs. 2 ====
Wednesday, July 10, 19:00

Sheet D	1	2	3	4	5	6	7	8	9	10	Final
Gyeonggi Province (Gim) 🔨	0	1	0	0	0	0	0	1	X	X	2
Chuncheon City Hall (M. Kim)	1	0	2	2	3	3	2	0	X	X	13

==== 3 vs. 4 ====
Wednesday, July 10, 19:00

Sheet A	1	2	3	4	5	6	7	8	9	10	Final
Gyeongbuk Athletic Association (K. Kim) 🔨	1	1	1	1	4	0	1	2	X	X	11
Songhyun High School B (Park)	0	0	0	0	0	1	0	0	X	X	1

==== Semifinal ====
Thursday, July 11, 9:00

Sheet C	1	2	3	4	5	6	7	8	9	10	Final
Gyeonggi Province (Gim) 🔨	0	1	0	1	1	3	0	1	0	X	7
Gyeongbuk Athletic Association (K. Kim)	0	0	2	0	0	0	2	0	1	X	5

==== Bronze medal game ====
Thursday, July 11, 14:00

Sheet D	1	2	3	4	5	6	7	8	9	10	Final
Gyeongbuk Athletic Association (K. Kim) 🔨	0	1	0	2	0	2	0	2	1	X	8
Songhyun High School B (Park)	0	0	1	0	1	0	1	0	0	X	3

==== Gold medal game ====
Thursday, July 11, 14:00

Sheet B	1	2	3	4	5	6	7	8	9	10	Final
Chuncheon City Hall (M. Kim) 🔨	0	0	1	0	0	2	0	2	0	0	5
Gyeonggi Province (Gim)	0	0	0	1	0	0	2	0	1	2	6

2019 Korean Curling Championships
(South Korea)
Gim Un-chi
4th Korean Championship title

=== Final standings ===
Place	Team	Skip
1st place, gold medalist(s)	Gyeonggi Province	Gim Un-chi
2nd place, silver medalist(s)	Chuncheon City Hall	Kim Min-ji
3rd place, bronze medalist(s)	Gyeongbuk Athletic Association	Kim Kyeong-ae
4	Songhyun High School B	Park You-been
5	Jeonbuk Province	Oh Eun-jin
6	Jeonju Girls High School	Kim Do-hye
