= Oh Seung-hoon (curler) =

South Korean curler (born 1995)

- Curler
- Born: May 11, 1995 (age 31); Uijeongbu, South Korea

Team
- Curling club: Gangwon Curling, Gangwon, KOR
- Skip: Park Jong-duk
- Third: Jeong Yeong-seok
- Second: Oh Seung-hoon
- Lead: Lee Ki-bok
- Alternate: Seong Ji-hoon

Curling career
- Member Association: South Korea
- World Championship: 1 (2024)
- Pan Continental Championship: 1 (2023)
Medal record
Men's curling
Representing South Korea
Pan Continental Championships
Silver medal – second place	2023 Kelowna
Pacific-Asia Junior Championships
Silver medal – second place	2014 Harbin
Representing Gyeonggi
Korean Men's Championship
Bronze medal – third place	2018 Jincheon
Bronze medal – third place	2019 Gangneung
Representing Gangwon
Korean Men's Championship
Gold medal – first place	2023 Gangneung
Silver medal – second place	2021 Gangneung
Silver medal – second place	2024 Uijeongbu
Bronze medal – third place	2022 Jincheon
Bronze medal – third place	2026 Uiseong

Oh Seung-hoon (born May 11, 1995, in Uijeongbu) is a South Korean curler from Gangwon Province. He currently plays second on the Gangwon Provincial Office curling team skipped by Park Jong-duk.

== Career ==
Oh represented South Korea at the 2014 Pacific-Asia Junior Curling Championships with his team of Jeong Yeong-seok, Kim Seung-min, Park Se-won and Noh Chang-hyun. After going 6–2 through the round robin, the team lost to China's Wang Jinbo in the final 8–6, missing out on qualifying for the 2014 World Junior Curling Championships.

In 2018, Oh joined the Gyeonggi-do Curling Federation curling team skipped by Kim Seung-min. At the 2018 and 2019 national championships, the team won bronze medals but never managed to qualify for the final. He left the team after the 2019–20 season to join the Gangwon Provincial Office team led by Park Jong-duk. At the 2020 Korean Curling Championships, the team missed the playoffs with a 3–3 record.

In 2021, Lee Ki-jeong took over as skip of the Gangwon rink with Park moving to third. At the 2021 Korean Curling Championships, the team made it to the finals of the second round but lost to Gyeongbuk Athletic Association's Kim Soo-hyuk, ultimately finishing in second place. The following year, the team, now led by Jeong Yeong-seok, finished 5–2 in the round robin but dropped their semifinal game to Seoul City Hall's Jeong Byeong-jin. They would bounce back in the bronze medal game to defeat Gyeonggido Curling Federation's Kim Jeong-min. Also during the 2022–23 season, Gangwon Provincial Office finished third at the 2022 Hokkaido Bank Curling Classic.

For the 2023–24 season, the Gangwon team again revised their lineup with Park Jong-duk taking over as skip. This proved to be a successful move for the team as they went on to run the table at the 2023 Korean Curling Championships to secure the national title, Oh's first time on the national team. After an 8–0 record in the first and second rounds, the team beat Seoul City Hall 7–4 in the final. This qualified the team to represent South Korea at the 2023 Pan Continental Curling Championships and the 2024 World Men's Curling Championship, as well as compete in tour events. After a second-place finish at the 2023 Hokkaido Bank Curling Classic, Gangwon Province reached the quarterfinals in four straight Canadian tour events. At the Pan Continental Championship, they had a strong start by notably defeating Canada's Brad Gushue 8–5 in the opening draw. They went on to finish the round robin with a 5–2 record, qualifying for the playoffs where they narrowly beat Japan 8–7. This earned them a spot in the gold medal game where, despite a strong start, they gave up key steals in the back half to concede 8–3 to the Canadian team. At the end of the season, Gangwon Provincial Office represented the country at the World Championship where they were unable to replicate their success from earlier in the year, finishing in twelfth place with a disappointing 2–10 record.

== Personal life ==
Oh attended Soongsil University.

== Teams ==
Season	Skip	Third	Second	Lead	Alternate
2013–14	Kim Seung-min (Fourth)	Jeong Yeong-seok (Skip)	Oh Seung-hoon	Park Se-won	Noh Chang-hyun
2014–15	Kim Seung-min (Fourth)	Jeong Yeong-seok (Skip)	Oh Seung-hoon	Park Se-won	Noh Chang-hyun
2018–19	Kim Seung-min	Chung Young-seok	Oh Seung-hoon	Jeong Min-seok	
2019–20	Jeong Yeong-seok	Kim Seung-min	Oh Seung-hoon	Park Se-won	Jeong Min-seok
2020–21	Park Jong-duk	Seo Min-guk	Kim Jeong-min	Oh Seung-hoon	
2021–22	Lee Ki-jeong	Park Jong-duk	Lee Ki-bok	Oh Seung-hoon	Seong Yu-jin
2022–23	Jeong Yeong-seok	Park Jong-duk	Oh Seung-hoon	Seong Ji-hoon	
2023–24	Park Jong-duk	Jeong Yeong-seok	Oh Seung-hoon	Seong Ji-hoon	Lee Ki-bok
2024–25	Park Jong-duk	Jeong Yeong-seok	Oh Seung-hoon	Lee Ki-bok	Seong Ji-hoon
2025–26	Park Jong-duk	Jeong Yeong-seok	Oh Seung-hoon	Lee Ki-bok	Seong Ji-hoon
