= Seong Ji-hoon =

South Korean curler

- Curler
- Born: Seong Yu-jin; August 4, 1997 (age 29); Cheongju, South Korea

Team
- Curling club: Gangwon Curling, Gangwon, KOR
- Skip: Park Jong-duk
- Third: Jeong Yeong-seok
- Second: Oh Seung-hoon
- Lead: Lee Ki-bok
- Alternate: Seong Ji-hoon
- Mixed doubles partner: Kim Kyeong-ae

Curling career
- Member Association: South Korea
- World Championship: 1 (2024)
- World Mixed Doubles Championship: 1 (2025)
- World Mixed Championship: 2 (2016, 2019)
- Pan Continental Championship: 1 (2023)
- Other appearances: Asian Winter Games: 1 (2025)
Medal record
Men's curling
Representing South Korea
Asian Winter Games
Silver medal – second place	2025 Harbin	Mixed doubles
Pan Continental Championships
Silver medal – second place	2023 Kelowna
World Junior Championships
Gold medal – first place	2017 Gangneung
Representing Gyeongbuk
Korean Mixed Doubles Championship
Gold medal – first place	2019 Gangneung
Gold medal – first place	2020 Gangneung
Representing Gangwon
Korean Men's Championship
Gold medal – first place	2023 Gangneung
Silver medal – second place	2021 Gangneung
Silver medal – second place	2024 Uijeongbu
Bronze medal – third place	2022 Jincheon
Bronze medal – third place	2026 Uiseong
Korean Mixed Doubles Championship
Gold medal – first place	2024 Jincheon

Seong Ji-hoon (born August 4, 1997, as Seong Yu-jin in Cheongju) is a South Korean curler from Gangwon Province. He is currently the alternate on the Gangwon Provincial Office curling team skipped by Park Jong-duk.

== Career ==
=== Juniors ===
In 2016, Seong and his junior team of Hong Jun-yeong, Jeon Byeong-uk, Lee Ge-on and Lee Jae-ho won the Korean Junior Championship, earning them the right to represent the country at the 2016 World Junior Curling Championships in Copenhagen, Denmark. There, the team struggled, finishing in last place in the group with a winless 0–9 record. Despite this, they were not relegated to the B Championship as Gangneung was to host the 2017 World Junior Curling Championships.

The next season, Seong joined the Lee Ki-jeong rink at second and won another Korean Junior title, sending him to his second world junior championship. There, his team found much more success, placing first in the round robin with an 8–1 record and earning a spot in the playoffs. After losing in the 1 vs. 2 game to the United States, the team downed Scotland's Cameron Bryce in the semifinal to qualify for the world junior final. Tied 4–4 in the tenth end, the Korean team scored one to take the win and secure South Korea's first world junior curling title in any discipline.

=== Men's ===
Following the 2016–17 season, Seong did not play on a men's team until the 2021–22 season when he joined the Gangwon Provincial Office team skipped by Lee. At the 2021 Korean Curling Championships, the team made it to the finals of the second round but lost to Gyeongbuk Athletic Association's Kim Soo-hyuk, ultimately finishing in second place. The following year, the team, now led by Jeong Yeong-seok, finished 5–2 in the round robin but dropped their semifinal game to Seoul City Hall's Jeong Byeong-jin. They would bounce back in the bronze medal game to defeat Gyeonggido Curling Federation's Kim Jeong-min. Also during the 2022–23 season, Gangwon Provincial Office finished third at the 2022 Hokkaido Bank Curling Classic.

For the 2023–24 season, the Gangwon team again revised their lineup with Park Jong-duk taking over as skip. This proved to be a successful move for the team as they went on to run the table at the 2023 Korean Curling Championships to secure the national title, Seong's first time on the national men's team. After an 8–0 record in the first and second rounds, the team beat Seoul City Hall 7–4 in the final. This qualified the team to represent South Korea at the 2023 Pan Continental Curling Championships and the 2024 World Men's Curling Championship, as well as compete in tour events. After a second-place finish at the 2023 Hokkaido Bank Curling Classic, Gangwon Province reached the quarterfinals in four straight Canadian tour events. At the Pan Continental Championship, they had a strong start by notably defeating Canada's Brad Gushue 8–5 in the opening draw. They went on to finish the round robin with a 5–2 record, qualifying for the playoffs where they narrowly beat Japan 8–7. This earned them a spot in the gold medal game where, despite a strong start, they gave up key steals in the back half to concede 8–3 to the Canadian team. At the end of the season, Gangwon Provincial Office represented the country at the World Championship where they were unable to replicate their success from earlier in the year, finishing in twelfth place with a disappointing 2–10 record.

=== Mixed doubles ===
In 2019, Seong teamed up with Olympic mixed doubles player Jang Hye-ji to win the 2019 Korean Mixed Doubles Championship, qualifying for the national team. After the championship, the duo had immediate success by winning the New Zealand Winter Games Mixed Doubles event, defeating Australia's Tahli Gill and Dean Hewitt in the final. Later in the season, at the 2019 World Mixed Doubles Qualification Event, the pair finished 5–1 in the round robin, finishing first in their pool and earning a playoff spot. After splitting their first two games, Seong and Jang beat Austria 7–2 in the final qualifier. This earned them the right to compete in the 2020 World Mixed Doubles Curling Championship, however, the event got cancelled due to the COVID-19 pandemic. At the 2020 championship, the team defended their title, however, did not represent Korea at the 2021 World Mixed Doubles Curling Championship after being beat out by Kim Ji-yoon and Moon Si-woo in a best-of-three qualifier.

Seong and Jang split after two seasons together and Seong formed a new mixed doubles team with Kim Hye-rin. The pair competed in the 2021 Korean Mixed Doubles Curling Championship, which doubled as the Olympic Trials for the 2022 Winter Olympics. After reaching the playoffs in the first round, the pair struggled to find consistency in the second round, finishing tied for seventh place at the end of the championship.

Seong later joined with Kim Kyeong-ae during the 2024-25 curling season. The pair would find immediate success, finishing second at the 2025 Asian Winter Games after losing to Japan 7–6 in the final.

=== Mixed ===
Seong competed at the 2016 World Mixed Curling Championship as second on the Korean team led by Lee Ki-bok. In the round robin, the team posted a 5–2 record to finish second in their pool and earn a spot in the playoffs. They then beat both Poland and Germany to reach the final four before losing to Russia in the semifinals. In the bronze medal game, they lost 8–4 to Scotland, finishing just off the podium. He returned to the championship three years later in 2019, skipping his own team of Jang Hye-ji, Jeon Jae-ik and Song Yu-jin. Once again, the team finished 5–2 through the round robin before winning two straight playoffs games to reach the semifinals. After losing to Germany in the semifinals, he again lost the bronze medal game for a second time in a row, this time to Norway.

== Personal life ==
Seong attended Andong National University. He changed his name from Seong Yu-jin to Seong Ji-hoon in 2021.

== Teams ==
Season	Skip	Third	Second	Lead	Alternate
2015–16	Seong Yu-jin	Hong Jun-yeong	Jeon Byeong-uk	Lee Ge-on	Lee Jae-ho
2016–17	Lee Ki-jeong	Lee Ki-bok	Seong Yu-jin	Choi Jeong-uk	Woo Gyeong-ho
2021–22	Lee Ki-jeong	Park Jong-duk	Lee Ki-bok	Oh Seung-hoon	Seong Yu-jin
2022–23	Jeong Yeong-seok	Park Jong-duk	Oh Seung-hoon	Seong Ji-hoon	
2023–24	Park Jong-duk	Jeong Yeong-seok	Oh Seung-hoon	Seong Ji-hoon	Lee Ki-bok
2024–25	Park Jong-duk	Jeong Yeong-seok	Oh Seung-hoon	Lee Ki-bok	Seong Ji-hoon
2025–26	Park Jong-duk	Jeong Yeong-seok	Oh Seung-hoon	Lee Ki-bok	Seong Ji-hoon
