= Ahn Jae-sung =

South Korean curler and coach

- Curler
- Born: October 12, 1988 (age 38)

Curling career
- Member Association: South Korea
- World Mixed Doubles Championship: 1 (2013)
Medal record
Men's curling
Representing Gyeonggi
Korean Men's Championship
Silver medal – second place	2011 Uijeongbu
Silver medal – second place	2012 Uijeongbu
Silver medal – second place	2015 Icheon

Ahn Jae-sung (born October 12, 1988) is a South Korean male curler and curling coach.

== Teams ==
=== Mixed doubles ===
Season	Male	Female	Coach	Events
2012–13	Ahn Jae-sung	Synn Hyun-ho	Lee Byung-gu	WMDCC 2013 (24th)

== Record as a coach of national teams ==
Year	Tournament, event	National team	Place
2014	2014 Winter Paralympics	South Korea (wheelchair)	9
2019	2019 World Mixed Curling Championship	South Korea (mixed)	4
2019	2019 World Mixed Doubles Qualification Event	South Korea (mixed doubles)	3rd place, bronze medalist(s)
