= Kim Min-jung (curler) =

South Korean curler

- Curler
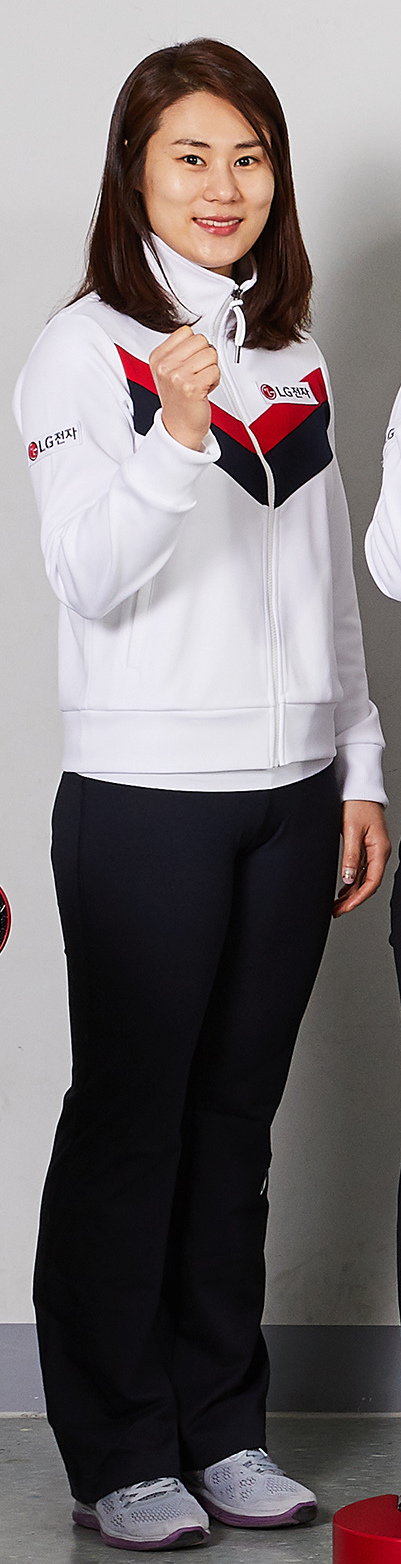
- Born: June 9, 1981 (age 45); Daegu, South Korea

Team
- Curling club: Uiseong CC, Uiseong, South Korea

Curling career
- Member Association: South Korea
- Pacific-Asia Championship: 2 (2012, 2014)
Medal record
Women's curling
Representing South Korea
Pacific-Asia Championships
Silver medal – second place	2014 Karuizawa
Bronze medal – third place	2012 Naseby
Representing Uiseong
Korean Women's Championship
Gold medal – first place	2012 Uijeongbu
Gold medal – first place	2014 Chongju
Silver medal – second place	2013 Chuncheon
Bronze medal – third place	2011 Uijeongbu
Bronze medal – third place	2015 Icheon

Kim Min-jung, nicknamed "MJ" is a South Korean curler. She was one of the coaches of the South Korean Women's Olympic Curling Team in 2018, skipped by Kim Eun-jung. After the Olympics, Team Kim accused Min-jung and her father Kim Kyung-doo (who was also the countries sports federation vice president) of abusing the team. She is no longer the coach of the team.

== Career ==
Kim was the alternate at first for the Kim Eun-jung team. They represented South Korea at the 2012 Pacific-Asia Curling Championships where they finished in third place after losing the semifinal to Japan's Satsuki Fujisawa, and therefore failed to qualify for the world championships.

Team Kim captured the national championship again in April 2014. At the 2014 Pacific-Asia Curling Championships, they had an unbeaten 8-0 round-robin record and a semifinal win over New Zealand. However, in the final, they lost against China's Liu Sijia on an extra-end steal, narrowly missing a berth to the world championships.

In April 2016, Team Kim claimed their third national championship by beating in the final a high school curling team skipped by Kim Min-ji, which had earned bronze at the world junior championships the previous month. Kim Min-jung was moved to the coach of the team as Kim Cho-hi came in as their new alternate. At the 2016 Pacific-Asia Curling Championships, the South Korean team went through the round-robin with a 6–1 record and won the semifinal over New Zealand. Then in the final, they defeated China's Wang Bingyu to capture the Pacific-Asia title. Later that season, they represented South Korea at the 2017 World Women's Curling Championship where they finished in sixth with a 5–6 record.

In May 2017, Team Kim defended their national title at the 2017 South Korean Curling Championships, which also served as trials for the 2018 Winter Olympics, by winning the best-of-seven final over Kim Min-ji 4-1 after defeating Gim Un-chi in the best-of-five semifinal 3–2. This qualified the team for the Olympics. Later that year Kim and her team won the gold medal at the 2017 Pacific-Asia Curling Championships.

The 2018 Olympic curling team of skip Kim Eun-jung, vice Kim Kyeong-ae, second Kim Seon-yeong and lead Kim Yeong-mi, coached by Peter Gallant of Canada and herself, received celebrity status for their strong performances despite entering the tournament as underdogs. Korea topped the round robin standings with just one loss while defeating heavily favoured Canada and Sweden, and then advanced to the final where they lost to Sweden to claim the silver medal. The next month, the team then played in the 2018 World Women's Curling Championship where they lost in the quarterfinals.

Team Kim accused the coaching staff of their team (excluding Peter Gallant) of holding back prize money and verbally abusing them. This included trying to get Kim Cho-hi kicked off the team so Min-jung could be the teams alternate and have a chance to get a medal (as the coaches of the teams don't) and trying to exclude skip Kim Eun-jung from team practices after they learned she was planning on starting a family. Kim Min-jung was ejected from being the team's coach.
