= Korean Curling Championships =

Korean National Curling Championships

- Established: Men's: 2001; Women's: 2003
- 2026 host city: Uiseong, North Gyeongsang Province
- 2026 arena: Uiseong Curling Center

Current champions (2026)
- Men: Uiseong-gun Office (Jeong Byeong-jin)
- Women: Gyeonggi Province (Gim Eun-ji)

Current edition
- 2026 Korean Curling Championships

The Korean Curling Championships (branded as the KB Financial Korean Curling Championships from 2012 to 2022) are the annual Korean men's and women's curling championships, organized by the Korean Curling Federation (KCF). The winners of the championship qualify for the Korean National Team. Until 2022, they earned the right to represent South Korea at the Pacific-Asia Curling Championships (PACC) and the World Curling Championships if they reached qualification. Every four years, the winners also qualify to represent South Korea at the Winter Olympic Games if the country received a berth. The championship also qualifies the winners for the Asian Winter Games if it is held during the season they are the national team.

Starting in 2022, the winners of the championships qualified for the Pan Continental Curling Championships, which replaced the PACC. If the team placed in the top five at the Pan-Continental, then they qualified for the upcoming World Championship.

The national championship is usually held in June or July, making it the first event of the new curling season.

== Results ==
The earliest known results from the Korean Curling Championships are from 2011.

=== Men ===
Year	Gold	Silver	Bronze	Host
2011	Team: Gyeongbuk Athletic Association; Kim Chang-min, Kim Min-chan, Seong Se-hyeon, Seo Young-seon, Oh Eun-su	Team: Gyeonggi-do Curling Federation; Choi Min-suk, Shin Dong-ho, Lee Seung-jun, Jeong Jae-suk, Ahn Jae-sung	Team: Gangwon Provincial Office; Kim Soo-hyuk, Kim Tae-hwan, Nam Yoon-ho, Lee Ye-jun	Uijeongbu, Gyeonggi Province
2011	Team: Gyeongbuk Athletic Association; Kim Chang-min, Kim Min-chan, Seong Se-hyeon, Seo Young-seon, Oh Eun-su	Team: Gyeonggi-do Curling Federation; Choi Min-suk, Shin Dong-ho, Lee Seung-jun, Jeong Jae-suk, Ahn Jae-sung	Team: Chungbuk Curling Competition Federation; Im Sung-min, Moon Sung-kwan, Park Man, Lee Seung-hang, Kim Kwang-sik	Uijeongbu, Gyeonggi Province
2012	Team: Gyeongbuk Athletic Association; Kim Chang-min, Kim Min-chan, Seong Se-hyeon, Seo Young-seon, Oh Eun-su	Team: Gyeonggi-do Curling Federation; Choi Min-suk, Shin Dong-ho, Lee Seung-jun, Jeong Jae-suk, Ahn Jae-sung	Team: Soongsil University; Kim Jeong-min, Kim San, Jang Jin-young, Seo Min-guk, Kim Woo-ram	Uijeongbu, Gyeonggi Province
2013	Team: Gangwon Provincial Office; Kim Soo-hyuk, Kim Tae-hwan, Park Jong-duk, Nam Yoon-ho, Lee Ye-jun	Team: Gyeongbuk Athletic Association; Kim Chang-min, Kim Min-chan, Seong Se-hyeon, Seo Young-seon, Oh Eun-su	Team: Chuncheon Machinery Technical High School; Lee Ki-jeong, Lee Ki-bok, Kim Hak-kyun, Lee Dong-hyeong, Jeong Byeong-jin	Chuncheon, Gangwon Province
2014	Team: Gangwon Provincial Office; Kim Soo-hyuk, Park Jong-duk, Kim Tae-hwan, Nam Yoon-ho, Yoo Min-hyeon	Team: Gyeongbuk Athletic Association; Seong Se-hyeon, Oh Eun-su, Kim Chi-gu, Seo Young-seon, Kim Min-chan	Team: Seoul Physical Education High School; Kim Min-woo, Hwang Hyeon-jun, Lee Jeong-jae, Jo Jang-won, Cheon Do-kyung	Chongju, North Pyongan Province
2015	Team: Gangwon Provincial Office; Kim Soo-hyuk, Park Jong-duk, Kim Tae-hwan, Yoo Min-hyeon, Nam Yoon-ho	Team: Gyeonggi-do Curling Federation; Lee Seung-jun, Shin Dong-ho, Kwon Young-il, Ahn Jae-sung, Jeong Jae-seok	Team: Gyeongbuk Athletic Association; Seong Se-hyeon, Oh Eun-su, Kim Chi-gu, Seo Young-seon, Kim Min-chan	Icheon, Gyeonggi Province
2016	Team: Gangwon Provincial Office; Kim Soo-hyuk, Kim Tae-hwan, Park Jong-duk, Nam Yoon-ho, Yoo Min-hyeon	Team: Gyeongbuk Athletic Association; Kim Chang-min, Seong Se-hyeon, Oh Eun-su, Kim Chi-gu	Team: Bongmyeong High School; Hong Joon-young, Lee Gun, Lee Jae-ho, Jeon Byeong-hwa, Shin Jae-hwan	Uiseong, North Gyeongsang Province
2017	Team: Gyeongbuk Athletic Association; Kim Chang-min, Seong Se-hyeon, Oh Eun-su, Lee Ki-bok, Kim Min-chan	Team: Gangwon Provincial Office; Kim Soo-hyuk, Kim Tae-hwan, Park Jong-duk, Nam Yoon-ho, Yoo Min-hyeon	Team: Uiseong Sports Club; Kim Ho-gun, Jeon Jae-ik, Choi Jeong-wook, Woo Kyung-ho	Icheon, Gyeonggi Province
2018	Team: Seoul City Hall; Kim Soo-hyuk, Lee Jeong-jae, Hwang Hyeon-jun, Jeong Byeong-jin, Lee Dong-hyeong	Team: Gangwon Provincial Office; Park Jong-duk, Nam Yoon-ho, Yoo Min-hyeon, Kim Jeong-min	Team: Gyeonggi-do Curling Federation; Kim Seung-min, Chung Young-suk, Oh Seung-hoon, Jeong Min-suk	Jincheon, North Chungcheong Province
2019	Team: Gyeongbuk Athletic Association; Kim Chang-min, Lee Ki-jeong, Kim Hak-kyun, Lee Ki-bok	Team: Seoul City Hall; Kim Soo-hyuk, Lee Jeong-jae, Jeong Byeong-jin, Hwang Hyeon-jun, Lee Dong-hyeong	Team: Gyeonggi-do Curling Federation; Jeong Yeong-seok, Kim Seung-min, Oh Seung-hoon, Park Se-won, Jeong Min-seok	Gangneung, Gangwon Province
2020	Team: Gyeonggi-do Curling Federation; Jeong Yeong-seok, Kim San, Park Se-won, Lee Jun-hyung, Kim Seung-min	Team: Gyeongbuk Athletic Association; Kim Chang-min, Lee Ki-jeong, Lee Ki-bok, Kim Hak-kyun	Team: Seoul City Hall; Kim Soo-hyuk, Lee Jeong-jae, Jeong Byeong-jin, Kim Tae-hwan	Gangneung, Gangwon Province
2021	Team: Gyeongbuk Athletic Association; Kim Soo-hyuk, Kim Chang-min, Jeon Jae-ik, Kim Hak-kyun	Team: Gangwon Provincial Office; Lee Ki-jeong, Park Jong-duk, Oh Seung-hoon, Lee Ki-bok, Seong Yu-jin	Team: Gyeonggi-do Curling Federation; Jeong Yeong-seok, Kim Jeong-min, Park Se-won, Lee Jun-hyung, Seo Min-guk	Gangneung, Gangwon Province
2022	Team: Seoul City Hall; Jeong Byeong-jin, Lee Jeong-jae, Kim Min-woo, Kim Tae-hwan	Team: Gyeongbuk Athletic Association; Kim Chang-min, Kim Soo-hyuk, Seong Se-hyeon, Kim Hak-kyun, Jeon Jae-ik	Team: Gangwon Provincial Office; Jeong Yeong-seok, Park Jong-duk, Oh Seung-hoon, Seong Ji-hoon	Jincheon, North Chungcheong Province
2023	Team: Gangwon Provincial Office; Park Jong-duk, Jeong Yeong-seok, Oh Seung-hoon, Seong Ji-hoon	Team: Seoul City Hall; Jeong Byeong-jin, Lee Jeong-jae, Kim Min-woo, Kim Tae-hwan	Team: Gyeongbuk Athletic Association; Kim Soo-hyuk, Kim Chang-min, Kim Hak-kyun, Jeon Jae-ik	Gangneung, Gangwon Province
2024	Team: Uiseong-gun Office; Lee Jae-beom, Kim Hyo-jun, Pyo Jeong-min, Kim Eun-bin, Kim Jin-hun	Team: Gangwon Provincial Office; Park Jong-duk, Jeong Yeong-seok, Oh Seung-hoon, Lee Ki-bok, Seong Ji-hoon	Team: Gyeongbuk Athletic Association; Kim Soo-hyuk, Kim Chang-min, Yoo Min-hyeon, Kim Hak-kyun, Jeon Jae-ik	Uijeongbu, Gyeonggi Province
2025	Team: Gyeongbuk Athletic Association; Kim Soo-hyuk, Kim Chang-min, Yoo Min-hyeon, Kim Hak-kyun, Jeon Jae-ik	Team: Seoul City Hall; Lee Jae-beom, Lee Ki-jeong, Kim Min-woo, Kim Jeong-min	Team: Uiseong-gun Office; Kim Hyo-jun, Kim Eun-bin, Pyo Jeong-min, Kim Jin-hun	Uijeongbu, Gyeonggi Province
2026	Team: Uiseong-gun Office; Jeong Byeong-jin, Kim Hyo-jun, Pyo Jeong-min, Kim Jin-hun, Kim Dae-hyun	Team: Gyeongbuk Athletic Association; Kim Chang-min, Yoo Min-hyeon, Shin Eun-jin	Team: Gangwon Provincial Office; Park Jong-duk, Jeong Yeong-seok, Oh Seung-hoon, Lee Ki-bok, Seong Ji-hoon	Uiseong, North Gyeongsang Province

=== Women ===
Year	Gold	Silver	Bronze	Host
2011	Team: Gyeonggi-do Athletic Association; Kim Ji-sun, Lee Seul-bee, Shin Mi-sung, Gim Un-chi, Lee Hyun-jung	Team: Jeonbuk Provincial Office; Kim Ji-seok, Jung Jin-sook, Park Mi-hee, Joo Yun-hwa, Kang Yu-ri	Team: Gyeongbuk Athletic Association; Kim Eun-jung, Kim Min-jung, Kim Yeong-mi, Lee Seon-mi, Oh Eun-jin	Uijeongbu, Gyeonggi Province
2011	Team: Gyeonggi-do Athletic Association; Kim Ji-sun, Lee Seul-bee, Shin Mi-sung, Gim Un-chi, Lee Hyun-jung	Team: Jeonbuk Provincial Office; Kim Ji-seok, Jung Jin-sook, Park Mi-hee, Joo Yun-hwa, Kang Yu-ri	Team: Sungshin Women's University; Ahn Jin-hee, Um Min-ji, Shin Su-yeon, Jeong Mi-yeon	Uijeongbu, Gyeonggi Province
2012	Team: Gyeongbuk Athletic Association; Kim Eun-jung, Kim Kyeong-ae, Kim Seon-yeong, Kim Yeong-mi, Kim Min-jung	Team: Sungshin Women's University; Ahn Jin-hee, Um Min-ji, Shin Su-yeon, Jeong Mi-yeon	Team: Gyeonggi-do Athletic Association; Kim Ji-sun, Lee Seul-bee, Shin Mi-sung, Gim Un-chi, Lee Hyun-jung	Uijeongbu, Gyeonggi Province
2013	Team: Gyeonggi Provincial Government; Kim Ji-sun, Lee Seul-bee, Um Min-ji, Gim Un-chi, Shin Mi-sung	Team: Gyeongbuk Athletic Association; Kim Eun-jung, Kim Kyeong-ae, Kim Seon-yeong, Kim Yeong-mi, Kim Min-jung	Team: Soongsil University; Kim Su-ji, Park Jung-hwa, Jung Hae-jin, Kim Hye-in	Chuncheon, Gangwon Province
2014	Team: Gyeongbuk Athletic Association; Kim Eun-jung, Kim Kyeong-ae, Kim Seon-yeong, Kim Yeong-mi, Kim Min-jung	Team: Soongsil University; Kim Su-ji, Park Jung-hwa, Woo Soo-bin, Kim Hye-in, Kim Ye-hyeon	Team: Jeonbuk Curling Federation; Ahn Jin-hee, Kang Yu-ri, Kim Eun-bi, Hwang Bo-ram, Kim Ji-sook	Chongju, North Pyongan Province
2015	Team: Gyeonggi Provincial Government; Gim Un-chi, Lee Seul-bee, Um Min-ji, Yeom Yoon-jung, Kim Ji-sun	Team: Soongsil University; Kim Su-ji, Park Jung-hwa, Woo Soo-bin, Kim Hye-in, Kim Ye-hyeon	Team: Gyeongbuk Athletic Association; Kim Eun-jung, Kim Kyeong-ae, Kim Seon-yeong, Kim Yeong-mi, Kim Min-jung	Icheon, Gyeonggi Province
2016	Team: Gyeongbuk Athletic Association; Kim Eun-jung, Kim Kyeong-ae, Kim Seon-yeong, Kim Yeong-mi, Kim Cho-hi	Team: Song Hyun High School B Kim Min-ji, Kim Hye-rin, Kim Ji-yeon, Yang Tae-i, Kim Su-jin	Team: Gyeonggi Provincial Government; Gim Un-chi, Lee Seul-bee, Um Min-ji, Kim Ji-sun, Yeom Yoon-jung	Uiseong, North Gyeongsang Province
2017	Team: Gyeongbuk Athletic Association; Kim Eun-jung, Kim Kyeong-ae, Kim Seon-yeong, Kim Yeong-mi	Team: Song Hyun High School E Kim Min-ji, Kim Hye-rin, Yang Tae-i, Kim Su-jin, Kim Myung-joo	Team: Gyeonggi Provincial Government; Gim Un-chi, Um Min-ji, Lee Seul-bee, Yeom Yoon-jung, Seol Ye-eun	Icheon, Gyeonggi Province
2018	Team: Chuncheon City Hall; Kim Min-ji, Kim Hye-rin, Yang Tae-i, Kim Su-jin	Team: Gyeongbuk Athletic Association; Kim Eun-jung, Kim Kyeong-ae, Kim Seon-yeong, Kim Yeong-mi, Kim Cho-hi	Team: Gyeonggi Provincial Government; Gim Un-chi, Um Min-ji, Seol Ye-eun, Seol Ye-ji	Jincheon, North Chungcheong Province
2019	Team: Gyeonggi Provincial Government; Gim Un-chi, Um Min-ji, Kim Su-ji, Seol Ye-eun, Seol Ye-ji	Team: Chuncheon City Hall; Kim Min-ji, Ha Seung-youn, Kim Hye-rin, Kim Su-jin, Yang Tae-i	Team: Gyeongbuk Athletic Association; Kim Kyeong-ae, Kim Cho-hi, Kim Seon-yeong, Kim Yeong-mi, Kim Eun-jung	Gangneung, Gangwon Province
2020	Team: Gyeongbuk Athletic Association; Kim Eun-jung, Kim Kyeong-ae, Kim Cho-hi, Kim Seon-yeong, Kim Yeong-mi	Team: Gyeonggi Provincial Government; Gim Un-chi, Seol Ye-ji, Kim Su-ji, Seol Ye-eun	Team: Chuncheon City Hall; Kim Min-ji, Ha Seung-youn, Kim Hye-rin, Kim Su-jin, Yang Tae-i	Gangneung, Gangwon Province
2021	Team: Gangneung City Hall; Kim Eun-jung, Kim Kyeong-ae, Kim Cho-hi, Kim Seon-yeong, Kim Yeong-mi	Team: Chuncheon City Hall; Kim Min-ji, Ha Seung-youn, Kim Hye-rin, Kim Su-jin, Yang Tae-i	Team: Gyeonggi Provincial Government; Gim Un-chi, Seol Ye-ji, Kim Su-ji, Seol Ye-eun, Park You-been	Gangneung, Gangwon Province
2022	Team: Chuncheon City Hall; Ha Seung-youn, Kim Hye-rin, Yang Tae-i, Kim Su-jin	Team: Gyeonggi Provincial Government; Gim Eun-ji, Kim Min-ji, Kim Su-ji, Seol Ye-eun, Seol Ye-ji	Team: Jeonbuk Provincial Office; Shin Ga-yeong, Lee Ji-yeong, Song Yu-jin, Shin Eun-jin	Jincheon, North Chungcheong Province
2023	Team: Gyeonggi Provincial Government; Gim Eun-ji, Kim Min-ji, Kim Su-ji, Seol Ye-eun, Seol Ye-ji	Team: Gangneung City Hall; Kim Eun-jung, Kim Kyeong-ae, Kim Cho-hi, Kim Seon-yeong, Kim Yeong-mi	Team: Chuncheon City Hall; Ha Seung-youn, Kim Hye-rin, Yang Tae-i, Kim Su-jin	Gangneung, Gangwon Province
2024	Team: Gyeonggi Provincial Government; Gim Eun-ji, Kim Min-ji, Kim Su-ji, Seol Ye-eun, Seol Ye-ji	Team: Chuncheon City Hall; Ha Seung-youn, Kim Hye-rin, Yang Tae-i, Kim Su-jin, Park Seo-jin	Team: Gangneung City Hall; Kim Eun-jung, Kim Kyeong-ae, Kim Cho-hi, Kim Seon-yeong, Kim Yeong-mi	Uijeongbu, Gyeonggi Province
2025	Team: Gyeonggi Provincial Government; Gim Eun-ji, Kim Min-ji, Kim Su-ji, Seol Ye-eun, Seol Ye-ji	Team: Chuncheon City Hall; Ha Seung-youn, Kim Hye-rin, Yang Tae-i, Kim Su-jin, Park Seo-jin	Team: Jeonbuk Provincial Office; Kang Bo-bae, Shim Yu-jeong, Kim Min-seo, Kim Ji-soo, Lee Bo-yeong	Uijeongbu, Gyeonggi Province
2026	Team: Gyeonggi Provincial Government; Gim Eun-ji, Kim Min-ji, Kim Su-ji, Seol Ye-eun, Seol Ye-ji	Team: Chuncheon City Hall; Park You-been, Park Seo-jin, Yang Tae-i, Kim Su-jin	Team: Gangneung City Hall; Ha Seung-youn, Kim Hye-rin, Kim Cho-hi, Kim Seon-yeong	Uiseong, North Gyeongsang Province
2026	Team: Gyeonggi Provincial Government; Gim Eun-ji, Kim Min-ji, Kim Su-ji, Seol Ye-eun, Seol Ye-ji	Team: Chuncheon City Hall; Park You-been, Park Seo-jin, Yang Tae-i, Kim Su-jin	Team: Seoul City Hall; Kim Ji-yoon, Lee Eun-chae, Lee Hae-in, Yang Seung-hee	Uiseong, North Gyeongsang Province

== See also ==
- Korean Mixed Doubles Curling Championship
- Kim Eun-jung (curler)
