= Lee Dong-hyeong =

South Korean curler

- Curler
- Born: November 21, 1996 (age 29); Chuncheon, South Korea

Team
- Curling club: Seoul CC, Seoul

Curling career
- Member Association: South Korea
- World Championship: 1 (2019)
- Pacific-Asia Championship: 1 (2018)
Medal record
Men's curling
Representing South Korea
Pacific-Asia Championships
Bronze medal – third place	2018 Gangneung
Representing Chuncheon
Korean Men's Championship
Bronze medal – third place	2013 Chuncheon
Representing Seoul
Korean Men's Championship
Gold medal – first place	2018 Jincheon
Silver medal – second place	2019 Gangneung

Lee Dong-hyeong (born November 21, 1996, in Chuncheon) is a South Korean male curler from Gyeonggi Province

At the international level, he is a 2018 Pacific-Asia bronze medallist.

== Teams ==
Season	Skip	Third	Second	Lead	Alternate	Coach	Events
2015–16	Kim Minu	Lee Jeong-jae	Lee Dong-hyeong	Jeong Byeong-jin	Kim Hakgyun		KMCC 2016 (4th)
2016–17	Kim MinWoo	Lee Jeong-jae	Lee Dong-hyeong	Jeong Byeong-jin			
2018–19	Kim Soo-hyuk	Jeong Byeong-jin	Lee Jeong-jae	Lee Dong-hyeong	Hwang Hyeon-jun	Lee JeHo	PACC 2018 (bronze)
2018–19	Lee Jeong-jae	Hwang Hyeon-jun	Jeong Byeong-jin	Lee Dong-hyeong		Lee JeHo	WUG 2019 (7th)
2018–19	Kim Soo-hyuk	Lee Jeong-jae	Jeong Byeong-jin	Hwang Hyeon-jun	Lee Dong-hyeong	Lee JeHo	WCC 2019 (13th)
2019–20	Kim Soo-hyuk	Lee Jeong-jae	Jeong Byeong-jin	Hwang Hyeon-jun	Lee Dong-hyeong		KMCC 2019 (silver)
