= Lee Jeong-jae (curler) =

South Korean curler (born 1996)

- Curler
- Born: June 13, 1996 (age 30); Seoul, South Korea

Team
- Curling club: Seoul CC, Seoul, KOR
- Mixed doubles partner: Yang Seung-hee

Curling career
- Member Association: South Korea
- World Championship: 2 (2019, 2023)
- Pacific-Asia Championship: 1 (2018)
- Pan Continental Championship: 1 (2022)
Medal record
Men's curling
Representing South Korea
Pan Continental Curling Championships
Silver medal – second place	2022 Calgary
Pacific-Asia Championships
Bronze medal – third place	2018 Gangneung
Representing Seoul
Korean Men's Championship
Gold medal – first place	2018 Jincheon
Gold medal – first place	2022 Jincheon
Silver medal – second place	2019 Gangneung
Silver medal – second place	2023 Gangneung
Bronze medal – third place	2014 Chongju
Bronze medal – third place	2020 Gangneung

Lee Jeong-jae (Korean: 이정재; born June 13, 1996 in Seoul) is a South Korean male curler from Gyeonggi Province

At the international level, he is a 2018 Pacific-Asia bronze medallist.

== Personal life ==
He is married and has one daughter.

== Teams ==
Season	Skip	Third	Second	Lead	Alternate	Coach	Events
2014–15	Emma McGuire	Simon Pack	Lee Jeong-jae	Travis Shingleton	Edward Scimia		
2015–16	Kim Mi-nu	Lee Jeong-jae	Lee Dong-hyeong	Jeong Byeong-jin	Kim Hak-kyun		KMCC 2016 (4th)
2016–17	Kim Min-woo	Lee Jeong-jae	Lee Dong-hyeong	Jeong Byeong-jin			
2018–19	Kim Soo-hyuk	Jeong Byeong-jin	Lee Jeong-jae	Lee Dong-hyeong	Hwang Hyeon-jun	Lee Je-ho	PACC 2018 (bronze)
2018–19	Lee Jeong-jae	Hwang Hyeon-jun	Jeong Byeong-jin	Lee Dong-hyeong		Lee Je-ho	WUG 2019 (7th)
2018–19	Kim Soo-hyuk	Lee Jeong-jae	Jeong Byeong-jin	Hwang Hyeon-jun	Lee Dong-hyeong	Lee Je-ho	WCC 2019 (13th)
2019–20	Kim Soo-hyuk	Lee Jeong-jae	Jeong Byeong-jin	Hwang Hyeon-jun	Lee Dong-hyeong		KMCC 2019 (silver)
2020–21	Kim Soo-hyuk	Lee Jeong-jae	Jeong Byeong-jin	Kim Tae-hwan			KMCC 2020 (bronze)
2021–22	Lee Jeong-jae	Jeong Byeong-jin	Kim San	Kim Tae-hwan		Kim Hyun-joo	KMCC 2021 (4th)
2022–23	Jeong Byeong-jin	Lee Jeong-jae	Kim Min-woo	Kim Tae-hwan	Lee Dong-hyeon	Yang Jae-bong	KMCC 2022 (gold)
2023–24	Jeong Byeong-jin	Lee Jeong-jae	Kim Min-woo	Kim Tae-hwan			KMCC 2023 (silver)
2024–25	Jeong Byeong-jin	Lee Jeong-jae	Kim Min-woo	Kim Jeong-min			
