= Hwang Hyeon-jun =

South Korean curler (born 1997)

- Curler
- Born: March 21, 1997 (age 29); Goyang, South Korea

Team
- Curling club: Seoul CC, Seoul

Curling career
- Member Association: South Korea
- World Championship: 1 (2019)
- Pacific-Asia Championship: 1 (2018)
Medal record
Men's curling
Representing South Korea
Pacific-Asia Championships
Bronze medal – third place	2018 Gangneung
Representing Seoul
Korean Men's Championship
Gold medal – first place	2018 Jincheon
Silver medal – second place	2019 Gangneung
Bronze medal – third place	2014 Chongju
Representing Gyeonggi
Korean Mixed Doubles Championship
Silver medal – second place	2016 Uiseong

Hwang Hyeon-jun (born March 21, 1997, in Goyang) is a South Korean male curler and curling coach from Gyeonggi Province

At the international level, he is a 2018 Pacific-Asia bronze medallist.

== Teams ==
Season	Skip	Third	Second	Lead	Alternate	Coach	Events
2017–18	Hwang Hyeon-jun	Jeong Byeong-jin	Lee Dong-hyeong	Lee Jae-beom	Choi Da-wun	Lee JeHo	WJCC 2018 (9th)
2018–19	Kim Soo-hyuk	Jeong Byeong-jin	Lee Jeong-jae	Lee Dong-hyeong	Hwang Hyeon-jun	Lee JeHo	PACC 2018 (bronze)
2018–19	Lee Jeong-jae	Hwang Hyeon-jun	Jeong Byeong-jin	Lee Dong-hyeong		Lee JeHo	WUG 2019 (7th)
2018–19	Kim Soo-hyuk	Lee Jeong-jae	Jeong Byeong-jin	Hwang Hyeon-jun	Lee Dong-hyeong	Lee JeHo	WCC 2019 (13th)
2019–20	Kim Soo-hyuk	Lee Jeong-jae	Jeong Byeong-jin	Hwang Hyeon-jun	Lee Dong-hyeong		KMCC 2019 (silver)

== Record as a coach of national teams ==
Year	Tournament, event	National team	Place
2018	2018 Winter Paralympics	South Korea (wheelchair)	4

== Personal life ==
He started curling in 2004 at the age of 8.
