= 2017 World Junior Curling Championships =

- Host city: Gangneung, South Korea
- Arena: Gangneung Curling Centre
- Dates: February 16–26
- Men's winner: South Korea
- Skip: Lee Ki-jeong
- Third: Lee Ki-bok
- Second: Seong Yu-jin
- Lead: Choi Jeong-uk
- Alternate: Woo Gyeong-ho
- Finalist: United States (Andrew Stopera)
- Women's winner: Sweden
- Skip: Isabella Wranå
- Third: Jennie Wåhlin
- Second: Almida de Val
- Lead: Fanny Sjöberg
- Alternate: Maria Larsson
- Finalist: Scotland (Sophie Jackson)

The 2017 World Junior Curling Championships (branded as the 2017 VoIP Defender World Junior Curling Championships for sponsorship reasons) was held from February 16 to 26 at the Gangneung Curling Centre in Gangneung, South Korea.

The tournament has been designated as a test event for curling at the 2018 Winter Olympics.

== Men ==
=== Teams ===
Men's teams

Country	Skip	Third	Second	Lead	Alternate
Canada	Tyler Tardi	Sterling Middleton	Jordan Tardi	Nicholas Meister	Nicholas Rabl
China	Wang Zhi Yu	Yuan Ming Jie (skip)	Li Hong Bo	Kang Xin Long	Cheng Kuo
Italy	Marco Onnis	Fabio Ribotta	Lorenzo Maurino	Marco Vespia	Davide Forchino
South Korea	Lee Ki-jeong	Lee Ki-bok	Seong Yu-jin	Choi Jeong-uk	Woo Gyeong-ho
Norway	Magnus Ramsfjell	Bendik Ramsfjell	Magnus Trulsen	Eskil Vintervold	Elias Høstmælingen
Scotland	Cameron Bryce	Robin Brydone	Euan Kyle	Frazer Shaw	Ross Whyte
Sweden	Johan Nygren	Fabian Wingfors	Emil Hermansson	Max Baeck	Anton Degerfeldt
Switzerland	Jan Hess	Simon Gloor	Simon Hoehn	Reto Schönenberger	Oliver Widmer
Turkey	Uğurcan Karagöz	Emre Karaman	Muhammed Uçan	Muhammed Ennes Caglayan	Ridvan Tekin
United States	Andrew Stopera	Luc Violette	Ben Richardson	Graem Fenson	Nicholas Connolly

=== Round-robin standings ===
Final round-robin standings

Key
Teams to Playoffs
Teams to Tie Breaker
Teams to relegated to "B" championships

Country	Skip	W	L
South Korea	Lee Ki-jeong	8	1
United States	Andrew Stopera	6	3
Scotland	Cameron Bryce	6	3
Canada	Tyler Tardi	6	3
Norway	Magnus Ramsfjell	6	3
Switzerland	Jan Hess	4	5
Sweden	Johan Nygren	4	5
Italy	Marco Onnis	2	7
China	Yuan Ming Jie	2	7
Turkey	Uğurcan Karagöz	1	8

=== Round-robin results ===
==== Draw 1 ====
Thursday, February 16, 14:00

Sheet A	1	2	3	4	5	6	7	8	9	10	11	Final
Scotland (Bryce)	0	0	0	1	1	0	0	1	1	2	0	6
United States (Stopera) 🔨	0	1	0	0	0	1	4	0	0	0	1	7

Sheet B	1	2	3	4	5	6	7	8	9	10	Final
Canada (Tardi)	0	2	0	3	0	2	0	0	3	2	12
Sweden (Nygren) 🔨	1	0	3	0	1	0	0	3	0	0	8

Sheet C	1	2	3	4	5	6	7	8	9	10	Final
Italy (Onnis)	0	0	0	0	2	0	1	0	X	X	3
Switzerland (Hess) 🔨	0	1	2	1	0	2	0	2	X	X	8

Sheet D	1	2	3	4	5	6	7	8	9	10	Final
Norway (Ramsfjell) 🔨	0	0	1	0	0	2	1	0	0	X	4
South Korea (Lee)	0	0	0	2	1	0	0	0	3	X	6

==== Draw 2 ====
Friday, February 17, 9:00

Sheet A	1	2	3	4	5	6	7	8	9	10	Final
Canada (Tardi)	0	0	1	0	2	0	2	0	0	X	5
South Korea (Lee) 🔨	3	0	0	2	0	2	0	1	1	X	9

Sheet B	1	2	3	4	5	6	7	8	9	10	Final
Italy (Onnis) 🔨	0	0	0	0	2	0	0	2	0	1	5
United States (Stopera)	0	1	0	0	0	1	0	0	1	0	3

Sheet C	1	2	3	4	5	6	7	8	9	10	Final
Norway (Ramsfjell) 🔨	0	0	0	3	0	0	0	1	2	X	6
Sweden (Nygren)	0	1	0	0	1	0	0	0	0	X	2

Sheet D	1	2	3	4	5	6	7	8	9	10	Final
China (Wang) 🔨	1	2	0	5	2	0	1	2	X	X	13
Turkey (Karagöz)	0	0	1	0	0	2	0	0	X	X	3

==== Draw 3 ====
Friday, February 17, 19:00

Sheet A	1	2	3	4	5	6	7	8	9	10	Final
Switzerland (Hess) 🔨	2	2	0	5	1	0	X	X	X	X	10
Sweden (Nygren)	0	0	1	0	0	2	X	X	X	X	3

Sheet B	1	2	3	4	5	6	7	8	9	10	Final
China (Wang)	0	0	1	0	0	0	0	2	0	X	3
Canada (Tardi) 🔨	1	2	0	0	1	1	1	0	1	X	7

Sheet C	1	2	3	4	5	6	7	8	9	10	Final
South Korea (Lee) 🔨	0	0	1	0	4	0	0	2	1	X	8
Turkey (Karagöz)	1	0	0	1	0	1	1	0	0	X	4

Sheet D	1	2	3	4	5	6	7	8	9	10	Final
Scotland (Bryce)	0	1	0	2	0	0	2	0	1	1	7
Norway (Ramsfjell) 🔨	2	0	4	0	0	1	0	0	1	0	8

==== Draw 4 ====
Saturday, February 18, 14:00

Sheet A	1	2	3	4	5	6	7	8	9	10	Final
Turkey (Karagöz)	0	0	0	1	0	1	0	1	X	X	3
Norway (Ramsfjell) 🔨	0	1	0	0	3	0	3	0	X	X	7

Sheet B	1	2	3	4	5	6	7	8	9	10	Final
Sweden (Nygren)	0	1	0	1	0	1	0	2	1	0	6
Scotland (Bryce) 🔨	1	0	2	0	2	0	2	0	0	1	8

Sheet C	1	2	3	4	5	6	7	8	9	10	Final
China (Wang) 🔨	0	0	1	0	3	0	1	0	0	0	5
Italy (Onnis)	0	1	0	1	0	2	0	1	0	1	6

Sheet D	1	2	3	4	5	6	7	8	9	10	Final
United States (Stopera) 🔨	0	1	3	0	2	0	0	3	0	X	9
Switzerland (Hess)	0	0	0	3	0	1	1	0	1	X	6

==== Draw 5 ====
Sunday, February 19, 9:00

Sheet B	1	2	3	4	5	6	7	8	9	10	Final
United States (Stopera)	0	1	0	0	0	1	0	2	0	X	4
South Korea (Kim) 🔨	1	0	0	1	0	0	2	0	3	X	7

Sheet C	1	2	3	4	5	6	7	8	9	10	11	Final
Scotland (Bryce)	2	0	0	2	0	0	2	1	0	0	1	8
Switzerland (Hess) 🔨	0	2	1	0	2	0	0	0	1	1	0	7

Sheet D	1	2	3	4	5	6	7	8	9	10	Final
Canada (Tardi) 🔨	4	3	0	0	0	2	X	X	X	X	9
Italy (Onnis)	0	0	1	1	0	0	X	X	X	X	2

==== Draw 6 ====
Sunday, February 19, 19:00

Sheet A	1	2	3	4	5	6	7	8	9	10	Final
Italy (Onnis) 🔨	0	1	0	1	0	1	0	0	0	X	3
South Korea (Lee)	0	0	3	0	2	0	0	0	2	X	7

Sheet B	1	2	3	4	5	6	7	8	9	10	Final
Norway (Ramsfjell)	1	1	0	2	0	2	0	2	X	X	8
China (Wang) 🔨	0	0	1	0	0	0	1	0	X	X	2

Sheet C	1	2	3	4	5	6	7	8	9	10	Final
Canada (Tardi)	0	0	0	0	2	0	0	0	0	X	2
United States (Stopera) 🔨	0	0	2	1	0	0	0	2	1	X	6

Sheet D	1	2	3	4	5	6	7	8	9	10	Final
Turkey (Karagöz)	0	1	0	1	0	2	0	0	1	X	5
Sweden (Nygren) 🔨	1	0	2	0	2	0	1	1	0	X	7

==== Draw 7 ====
Monday, February 20, 14:00

Sheet A	1	2	3	4	5	6	7	8	9	10	Final
China (Wang)	0	0	2	0	1	0	0	0	X	X	3
Scotland (Bryce) 🔨	1	2	0	1	0	2	1	1	X	X	8

Sheet B	1	2	3	4	5	6	7	8	9	10	Final
Switzerland (Hess)	0	0	3	1	0	1	0	1	0	1	7
Turkey (Karagöz) 🔨	1	0	0	0	1	0	2	0	2	0	6

Sheet C	1	2	3	4	5	6	7	8	9	10	Final
Sweden (Nygren)	0	1	0	1	0	0	1	0	X	X	3
South Korea (Lee) 🔨	2	0	2	0	1	1	0	3	X	X	9

Sheet D	1	2	3	4	5	6	7	8	9	10	Final
Norway (Ramsfjell)	0	0	0	3	0	0	0	2	0	0	5
Canada (Tardi) 🔨	0	0	2	0	1	1	1	0	1	2	8

==== Draw 8 ====
Tuesday, February 21, 9:00

Sheet A	1	2	3	4	5	6	7	8	9	10	Final
United States (Stopera) 🔨	2	3	0	2	3	0	X	X	X	X	10
Turkey (Karagöz)	0	0	1	0	0	0	X	X	X	X	1

Sheet B	1	2	3	4	5	6	7	8	9	10	Final
Scotland (Bryce) 🔨	0	2	1	0	2	0	0	0	2	X	7
Italy (Onnis)	0	0	0	1	0	2	2	0	0	X	5

Sheet D	1	2	3	4	5	6	7	8	9	10	Final
Switzerland (Hess)	0	2	0	3	1	0	2	0	1	X	9
China (Wang) 🔨	1	0	1	0	0	1	0	1	0	X	4

==== Draw 9 ====
Tuesday, February 21, 19:00

Sheet A	1	2	3	4	5	6	7	8	9	10	Final
Sweden (Nygren) 🔨	2	0	1	0	2	0	1	1	0	1	8
Italy (Onnis)	0	1	0	1	0	2	0	0	1	0	5

Sheet B	1	2	3	4	5	6	7	8	9	10	Final
United States (Stopera)	0	0	0	0	0	1	1	0	3	0	5
Norway (Ramsfjell) 🔨	0	0	0	0	1	0	0	1	0	1	3

Sheet C	1	2	3	4	5	6	7	8	9	10	Final
Switzerland (Hess)	0	0	1	0	0	1	0	1	X	X	3
Canada (Tardi) 🔨	1	0	0	2	3	0	2	0	X	X	8

Sheet D	1	2	3	4	5	6	7	8	9	10	11	Final
South Korea (Lee)	1	0	1	0	2	0	2	0	1	0	1	8
Scotland (Bryce) 🔨	0	1	0	2	0	2	0	1	0	1	0	7

==== Draw 10 ====
Wednesday, February 22, 14:00

Sheet A	1	2	3	4	5	6	7	8	9	10	Final
South Korea (Lee)	0	0	1	1	0	0	0	4	0	0	6
China (Wang) 🔨	1	1	0	0	0	2	1	0	2	1	8

Sheet B	1	2	3	4	5	6	7	8	9	10	11	Final
Turkey (Karagöz)	0	0	0	3	0	1	0	0	0	1	0	5
Canada (Tardi) 🔨	0	1	0	0	2	0	1	1	0	0	2	7

Sheet C	1	2	3	4	5	6	7	8	9	10	Final
Italy (Onnis)	0	1	0	2	0	0	1	0	X	X	4
Norway (Ramsfjell) 🔨	2	0	4	0	0	2	0	2	X	X	10

Sheet D	1	2	3	4	5	6	7	8	9	10	11	Final
Sweden (Nygren)	0	3	0	0	1	2	0	2	0	0	1	9
United States (Stopera) 🔨	1	0	2	1	0	0	1	0	2	1	0	8

==== Draw 11 ====
Thursday, February 23, 9:00

Sheet A	1	2	3	4	5	6	7	8	9	10	Final
Norway (Ramsfjell)	0	0	2	2	0	1	0	1	2	0	8
Switzerland (Hess) 🔨	0	3	0	0	1	0	1	0	0	1	6

Sheet B	1	2	3	4	5	6	7	8	9	10	Final
China (Wang)	0	0	2	1	0	2	0	3	0	0	8
Sweden (Nygren) 🔨	1	1	0	0	4	0	1	0	1	2	10

Sheet C	1	2	3	4	5	6	7	8	9	10	Final
Turkey (Karagöz)	0	1	0	0	3	0	0	0	0	X	4
Scotland (Bryce) 🔨	1	0	2	0	0	2	0	0	2	X	7

==== Draw 12 ====
Thursday, February 23, 19:00

Sheet A	1	2	3	4	5	6	7	8	9	10	11	Final
Scotland (Bryce)	2	0	3	0	0	2	0	0	1	0	1	9
Canada (Tardi) 🔨	0	2	0	0	2	0	2	0	0	2	0	8

Sheet B	1	2	3	4	5	6	7	8	9	10	Final
South Korea (Lee)	3	0	0	0	2	0	2	4	0	X	11
Switzerland (Hess) 🔨	0	1	1	1	0	2	0	0	1	X	6

Sheet C	1	2	3	4	5	6	7	8	9	10	Final
United States (Stopera) 🔨	0	1	0	0	2	0	1	0	0	2	6
China (Wang)	0	0	1	1	0	0	0	2	0	0	4

Sheet D	1	2	3	4	5	6	7	8	9	10	Final
Italy (Onnis)	0	1	0	0	1	0	X	X	X	X	2
Turkey (Karagöz) 🔨	1	0	0	4	0	3	X	X	X	X	8

==== Tie Breaker ====
Friday, February 24, 9:00

Team	1	2	3	4	5	6	7	8	9	10	Final
Canada (Tardi) 🔨	2	1	0	0	2	0	0	2	0	0	7
Norway (Ramsfjell)	0	0	3	1	0	1	2	0	0	1	8

=== Playoffs ===
Page playoff system
1	South Korea	5
2	United States	7
3	Scotland	8
4	Norway	7

Semifinal
1	South Korea	11
3	Scotland	4

Final
2	United States	4
1	South Korea	5

Bronze-medal game
3	Scotland	3
4	Norway	10

==== 1 vs. 2 ====
Friday, February 24, 19:00

Team	1	2	3	4	5	6	7	8	9	10	Final
South Korea (Lee) 🔨	0	1	0	2	0	0	0	1	0	1	5
United States (Stopera)	0	0	1	0	3	2	1	0	0	0	7

==== 3 vs. 4 ====
Friday, February 24, 19:00

Team	1	2	3	4	5	6	7	8	9	10	11	Final
Scotland (Bryce)	0	2	0	1	1	0	0	1	0	2	1	8
Norway (Ramsfjell) 🔨	2	0	1	0	0	0	1	0	3	0	0	7

==== Semifinal ====
Saturday, February 25, 9:00

Team	1	2	3	4	5	6	7	8	9	10	Final
South Korea (Lee) 🔨	3	0	2	1	0	3	0	2	X	X	11
Scotland (Bryce)	0	2	0	0	1	0	1	0	X	X	4

==== Bronze-medal game ====
Sunday, February 26, 14:00

Team	1	2	3	4	5	6	7	8	9	10	Final
Scotland (Bryce) 🔨	0	0	0	1	0	1	1	0	X	X	3
Norway (Ramsfjell)	2	2	3	0	2	0	0	1	X	X	10

==== Final ====
Sunday, February 26, 14:00

Team	1	2	3	4	5	6	7	8	9	10	Final
United States (Stopera) 🔨	0	0	0	0	2	0	0	0	2	0	4
South Korea (Lee)	0	0	0	1	0	0	2	1	0	1	5

=== Top 5 Player percentages ===
Round robin only

Leads	%
(Canada) Nicholas Meister	86
(Switzerland) Reto Schoenenberger	82
(Turkey) Muhammed Ennes Caglayan	79
(Scotland) Frazer Shaw	79
(Sweden) Max Baeck	78

Seconds	%
(Norway) Magnus Trulsen	80
(United States) Ben Richardson	79
(South Korea) Seong Yu-jin	79
(Scotland) Euan Kyle	78
(Canada) Jordan Tardi	78

Thirds	%
(United States) Luc Violette	82
(South Korea) Lee Ki-bok	81
(Scotland) Robin Brydone	78
(Norway) Bendik Ramsfjell	78
(Switzerland) Simon Gloor	77
(Canada) Sterling Middleton	77

Skips	%
(United States) Andrew Stopera	80
(Canada) Tyler Tardi	79
(South Korea) Lee Ki-jeong	78
(Norway) Magnus Ramsfjell	78
(Scotland) Cameron Bryce	77

== Women ==
=== Teams ===
Women's teams

Country	Skip	Third	Second	Lead	Alternate
Canada	Kristen Streifel	Chantele Broderson	Kate Goodhelpsen	Brenna Bilassy	Karlee Burgess
Hungary	Bernadett Biro	Linda Joo	Regina Dobor	Blanka Biro	Laura Nagy
Japan	Misaki Tanaka	Yui Tanaka	Kaede Kudo	Naoko Kawamura	Sakiko Suzuki
South Korea	Kim Min-ji	Kim Hye-rin	Yang Tae-i	Kim Su-jin	Kim Myeong-ju
Russia	Maria Baksheeva	Daria Morozova	Maria Komarova	Ekaterina Kuzmina	Olga Kotelnikova
Scotland	Sophie Jackson	Naomi Brown	Mili Smith	Sophie Sinclair	Laura Barr
Sweden	Isabella Wranå	Jennie Wåhlin	Almida de Val	Fanny Sjöberg	Maria Larsson
Switzerland	Selina Witschonke	Elena Mathis	Melina Bezzola	Anna Gut	Laura Engler
Turkey	Dilşat Yıldız	Canan Temuren	Beyzanur Konuksever	Beyza Nur Emer	
United States	Annmarie Dubberstein	Christine McMakin	Jenna Burchesky	Allison Howell	Madison Bear

=== Round-robin standings ===
Final round-robin standings

Key
Teams to Playoffs
Teams to Tie Breaker
Teams to relegated to "B" championships

Country	Skip	W	L
Scotland	Sophie Jackson	7	2
Sweden	Isabella Wranå	7	2
Canada	Kristen Streifel	6	3
South Korea	Kim Min-ji	5	4
Switzerland	Selina Witschonke	5	4
Russia	Maria Baksheeva	5	4
United States	Annmarie Dubberstein	4	5
Japan	Misaki Tanaka	4	5
Hungary	Bernadett Biro	1	8
Turkey	Dilşat Yıldız	1	8

=== Round-robin results ===
==== Draw 1 ====
Thursday, February 16, 9:00

Sheet A	1	2	3	4	5	6	7	8	9	10	Final
Canada (Streifel) 🔨	0	4	1	1	2	0	X	X	X	X	8
Hungary (Biro)	0	0	0	0	0	1	X	X	X	X	1

Sheet B	1	2	3	4	5	6	7	8	9	10	Final
South Korea (Kim)	2	0	2	0	0	0	1	1	0	0	6
Scotland (Jackson) 🔨	0	2	0	1	1	1	0	0	1	1	7

Sheet C	1	2	3	4	5	6	7	8	9	10	Final
Sweden (Wranå) 🔨	0	3	0	2	3	1	0	X	X	X	9
Japan (Tanaka)	0	0	1	0	0	0	1	X	X	X	2

Sheet D	1	2	3	4	5	6	7	8	9	10	Final
United States (Dubberstein)	1	0	0	1	0	2	1	0	2	0	7
Turkey (Yıldız) 🔨	0	1	1	0	2	0	0	2	0	2	8

==== Draw 2 ====
Thursday, February 16, 19:00

Sheet A	1	2	3	4	5	6	7	8	9	10	Final
Russia (Baksheeva) 🔨	1	0	0	0	2	0	1	0	2	0	6
Switzerland (Witschonke)	0	0	0	2	0	1	0	2	0	2	7

Sheet B	1	2	3	4	5	6	7	8	9	10	Final
Sweden (Wranå) 🔨	0	0	2	0	4	0	1	0	0	1	8
Canada (Streifel)	2	2	0	1	0	0	0	1	1	0	7

Sheet C	1	2	3	4	5	6	7	8	9	10	Final
Turkey (Yıldız)	0	1	0	1	0	2	X	X	X	X	4
South Korea (Kim) 🔨	5	0	4	0	3	0	X	X	X	X	12

Sheet D	1	2	3	4	5	6	7	8	9	10	Final
Scotland (Jackson)	0	2	0	0	0	3	0	2	1	0	8
Hungary (Biro) 🔨	1	0	1	0	2	0	2	0	0	1	7

==== Draw 3 ====
Friday, February 17, 14:00

Sheet A	1	2	3	4	5	6	7	8	9	10	Final
Turkey (Yıldız)	0	0	0	2	1	0	0	2	0	X	5
Scotland (Jackson) 🔨	3	3	1	0	0	0	1	0	2	X	10

Sheet B	1	2	3	4	5	6	7	8	9	10	Final
Russia (Baksheeva)	0	1	0	1	0	0	2	0	1	0	5
Japan (Tanaka) 🔨	2	0	1	0	1	0	0	1	0	1	6

Sheet C	1	2	3	4	5	6	7	8	9	10	Final
Hungary (Biro)	0	1	0	1	0	3	0	1	0	X	6
United States (Dubebrstein) 🔨	3	0	1	0	2	0	2	0	1	X	9

Sheet D	1	2	3	4	5	6	7	8	9	10	Final
Switzerland (Witschonke) 🔨	0	1	0	2	0	1	0	1	0	0	5
Canada (Streifel)	0	0	1	0	2	0	2	0	1	1	7

==== Draw 4 ====
Saturday, February 18, 9:00

Sheet A	1	2	3	4	5	6	7	8	9	10	Final
Sweden (Wranå) 🔨	0	2	0	3	3	2	X	X	X	X	10
Russia (Baksheeva)	1	0	0	0	0	0	X	X	X	X	1

Sheet C	1	2	3	4	5	6	7	8	9	10	Final
Switzerland (Witschonke) 🔨	0	2	0	2	0	1	2	0	3	1	11
United States (Dubberstein)	2	0	2	0	2	0	0	6	0	0	12

Sheet D	1	2	3	4	5	6	7	8	9	10	11	Final
Japan (Tanaka)	0	0	0	2	1	2	0	1	0	0	0	6
South Korea (Kim) 🔨	0	1	2	0	0	0	2	0	0	1	1	7

==== Draw 5 ====
Saturday, February 18, 19:00

Sheet A	1	2	3	4	5	6	7	8	9	10	Final
United States (Dubberstein)	0	0	1	4	0	3	1	X	X	X	9
Japan (Tanaka) 🔨	0	1	0	0	2	0	0	X	X	X	3

Sheet B	1	2	3	4	5	6	7	8	9	10	Final
South Korea (Kim)	0	1	0	2	0	0	1	4	0	X	8
Hungary (Biro) 🔨	0	0	2	0	2	1	0	0	0	X	5

Sheet C	1	2	3	4	5	6	7	8	9	10	Final
Canada (Streifel)	3	0	0	2	0	0	0	1	0	2	8
Turkey (Yıldız) 🔨	0	1	1	0	2	0	0	0	2	0	6

Sheet D	1	2	3	4	5	6	7	8	9	10	Final
Sweden (Wranå) 🔨	0	0	1	0	2	1	0	1	0	0	5
Scotland (Jackson)	0	1	0	1	0	0	1	0	1	2	6

==== Draw 6 ====
Sunday, February 19, 14:00

Sheet A	1	2	3	4	5	6	7	8	9	10	Final
South Korea (Kim) 🔨	0	1	0	0	3	0	0	0	0	0	4
Canada (Streifel)	1	0	0	1	0	2	0	0	1	2	7

Sheet B	1	2	3	4	5	6	7	8	9	10	Final
Turkey (Yıldız) 🔨	0	0	1	0	1	0	0	0	X	X	2
Sweden (Wranå)	2	2	0	1	0	2	1	1	X	X	9

Sheet C	1	2	3	4	5	6	7	8	9	10	Final
Switzerland (Witschonke) 🔨	0	0	2	2	0	0	1	1	0	2	8
Scotland (Jackson)	1	2	0	0	0	2	0	0	2	0	7

Sheet D	1	2	3	4	5	6	7	8	9	10	Final
Hungary (Biro)	1	0	1	0	0	1	0	0	0	X	3
Russia (Baksheeva) 🔨	0	1	0	2	1	0	0	0	1	X	5

==== Draw 7 ====
Monday, February 20, 9:00

Sheet B	1	2	3	4	5	6	7	8	9	10	Final
Scotland (Jackson)	0	1	1	0	2	1	2	0	2	0	9
Japan (Tanaka) 🔨	1	0	0	2	0	0	0	3	0	1	7

Sheet C	1	2	3	4	5	6	7	8	9	10	Final
Russia (Baksheeva)	0	2	1	0	3	0	2	0	2	X	10
United States (Dubberstein) 🔨	1	0	0	1	0	1	0	2	0	X	5

Sheet D	1	2	3	4	5	6	7	8	9	10	Final
Turkey (Yıldız) 🔨	1	0	0	3	0	0	2	0	0	X	6
Switzerland (Witschonke)	0	1	1	0	2	2	0	1	1	X	8

==== Draw 8 ====
Monday, February 20, 19:00

Sheet A	1	2	3	4	5	6	7	8	9	10	Final
Hungary (Biro)	0	0	1	0	1	1	0	1	0	X	4
Sweden (Wranå) 🔨	0	3	0	2	0	0	1	0	4	X	10

Sheet B	1	2	3	4	5	6	7	8	9	10	Final
Canada (Streifel) 🔨	0	2	0	2	0	1	1	0	2	X	8
Russia (Baksheeva)	0	0	1	0	1	0	0	1	0	X	3

Sheet C	1	2	3	4	5	6	7	8	9	10	Final
Japan (Tanaka)	0	1	2	0	0	1	0	1	0	X	5
Switzerland (Witschonke) 🔨	2	0	0	1	1	0	2	0	2	X	8

Sheet D	1	2	3	4	5	6	7	8	9	10	Final
South Korea (Kim) 🔨	2	0	2	4	0	2	X	X	X	X	10
United States (Dubberstein)	0	2	0	0	1	0	X	X	X	X	3

==== Draw 9 ====
Tuesday, February 21, 14:00

Sheet A	1	2	3	4	5	6	7	8	9	10	Final
Scotland (Jackson) 🔨	0	0	0	0	2	1	0	1	3	X	7
United States (Dubberstein)	0	0	0	1	0	0	1	0	0	X	2

Sheet B	1	2	3	4	5	6	7	8	9	10	Final
Sweden (Wranå) 🔨	0	0	2	0	3	0	0	0	1	1	7
South Korea (Kim)	0	1	0	1	0	2	0	0	0	0	4

Sheet C	1	2	3	4	5	6	7	8	9	10	Final
Turkey (Yıldız) 🔨	0	3	1	0	0	2	0	3	2	0	11
Hungary (Biro)	4	0	0	3	1	0	3	0	0	1	12

Sheet D	1	2	3	4	5	6	7	8	9	10	Final
Canada (Streifel)	0	0	0	0	1	0	X	X	X	X	1
Japan (Tanaka) 🔨	1	3	2	3	0	1	X	X	X	X	10

==== Draw 10 ====
Wednesday, February 22, 9:00

Sheet A	1	2	3	4	5	6	7	8	9	10	Final
Russia (Baksheeva) 🔨	0	2	1	1	1	1	0	1	1	X	8
Turkey (Yıldız)	0	0	0	0	0	0	1	0	0	X	1

Sheet B	1	2	3	4	5	6	7	8	9	10	Final
Hungary (Biro)	0	0	2	0	0	0	0	1	X	X	3
Switzerland (Witschonke) 🔨	1	2	0	0	0	2	2	0	X	X	7

Sheet C	1	2	3	4	5	6	7	8	9	10	Final
Scotland (Jackson)	0	0	0	4	0	2	1	0	1	X	8
Canada (Streifel) 🔨	0	2	0	0	2	0	0	1	0	X	5

==== Draw 11 ====
Wednesday, February 22, 19:00

Sheet A	1	2	3	4	5	6	7	8	9	10	Final
Switzerland (Witschonke)	0	2	0	0	1	0	1	0	1	X	5
South Korea (Kim) 🔨	3	0	3	1	0	1	0	1	0	X	9

Sheet B	1	2	3	4	5	6	7	8	9	10	Final
Japan (Tanaka)	1	0	1	0	2	2	0	1	0	1	8
Turkey (Yıldız) 🔨	0	1	0	1	0	0	2	0	2	0	6

Sheet C	1	2	3	4	5	6	7	8	9	10	Final
United States (Dubberstein)	0	0	0	1	0	3	0	2	2	X	8
Sweden (Wranå) 🔨	2	0	0	0	1	0	1	0	0	X	4

Sheet D	1	2	3	4	5	6	7	8	9	10	11	Final
Russia (Baksheeva)	2	0	2	0	0	0	0	1	2	0	1	8
Scotland (Jackson) 🔨	0	3	0	2	1	0	0	0	0	1	0	7

==== Draw 12 ====
Thursday, February 23, 14:00

Sheet A	1	2	3	4	5	6	7	8	9	10	Final
Japan (Tanaka)	2	0	1	0	1	2	0	0	1	X	7
Hungary (Biro) 🔨	0	1	0	1	0	0	1	1	0	X	4

Sheet B	1	2	3	4	5	6	7	8	9	10	Final
United States (Dubberstein)	0	1	0	0	1	0	1	0	X	X	3
Canada (Streifel) 🔨	2	0	2	2	0	2	0	1	X	X	9

Sheet C	1	2	3	4	5	6	7	8	9	10	Final
South Korea (Kim)	0	0	0	0	0	0	0	3	0	0	3
Russia (Baksheeva) 🔨	0	0	0	2	0	1	0	0	0	1	4

Sheet D	1	2	3	4	5	6	7	8	9	10	Final
Switzerland (Witschonke) 🔨	1	0	2	0	0	1	0	0	0	X	4
Sweden (Wranå)	0	1	0	2	1	0	0	1	1	X	6

==== Playoff Tie Breaker ====
Friday, February 24, 9:00

Team	1	2	3	4	5	6	7	8	9	10	Final
South Korea (Kim) 🔨	2	0	1	0	2	1	0	1	0	X	7
Switzerland (Witschonke)	0	1	0	2	0	0	1	0	1	X	5

==== Relegation Tie Breaker ====
Friday, February 24, 9:00

Team	1	2	3	4	5	6	7	8	9	10	Final
United States (Dubberstein) 🔨	1	0	3	0	1	2	1	0	3	X	11
Japan (Tanaka)	0	4	0	2	0	0	0	2	0	X	8

=== Playoffs ===
Page playoff system
1	Scotland	6
2	Sweden	9
3	Canada	7
4	South Korea	5

Semifinal
1	Scotland	13
3	Canada	2

Final
2	Sweden	10
1	Scotland	7

Bronze-medal game
3	Canada	6
4	South Korea	3

==== 1 vs. 2 ====
Friday, February 24, 14:00

Team	1	2	3	4	5	6	7	8	9	10	Final
Scotland (Jackson) 🔨	1	0	0	0	1	0	2	0	2	X	6
Sweden (Wranå)	0	2	3	0	0	2	0	2	0	X	9

==== 3 vs. 4 ====
Friday, February 24, 14:00

Team	1	2	3	4	5	6	7	8	9	10	Final
Canada (Streifel) 🔨	0	1	0	0	1	0	2	2	1	0	7
South Korea (Kim)	0	0	1	0	0	3	0	0	0	1	5

==== Semifinal ====
Saturday, February 25, 9:00

Team	1	2	3	4	5	6	7	8	9	10	Final
Scotland (Jackson) 🔨	3	0	2	4	3	1	0	0	X	X	13
Canada (Streifel)	0	1	0	0	0	0	1	0	X	X	2

==== Bronze-medal game ====
Saturday, February 25, 15:00

Team	1	2	3	4	5	6	7	8	9	10	Final
Canada (Streifel) 🔨	0	0	2	0	1	0	1	0	1	1	6
South Korea (Kim)	0	0	0	1	0	1	0	1	0	0	3

==== Final ====
Saturday, February 25, 15:00

Team	1	2	3	4	5	6	7	8	9	10	Final
Sweden (Wranå) 🔨	1	0	2	0	3	2	0	2	0	X	10
Scotland (Jackson)	0	1	0	3	0	0	2	0	1	X	7

=== Top 5 Player percentages ===
Round robin only

Leads	%
(South Korea) Kim Su-jin	80
(Scotland) Sophie Sinclair	80
(Sweden) Fanny Sjöberg	80
(Switzerland) Anna Gut	75
(United States) Allison Howell	73
(Russia) Ekaterina Kuzmina	73

Seconds	%
(Sweden) Almida de Val	82
(South Korea) Yang Tae-i	79
(Scotland) Mili Smith	76
(Russia) Maria Komarova	73
(Japan) Kaede Kudo	70

Thirds	%
(Scotland) Naomi Brown	81
(South Korea) Kim Hye-rin	79
(Sweden) Jennie Wåhlin	77
(Canada) Chantele Broderson	74
(Russia) Daria Morozova	70

Skips	%
(Russia) Maria Baksheeva	79
(South Korea) Kim Min-ji	73
(Sweden) Isabella Wranå	72
(Canada) Kristen Streifel	69
(Scotland) Sophie Jackson	68
(Japan) Misaki Tanaka	68
(Switzerland) Selina Witschonke	68
