= Um Min-ji =

South Korean curler (born 1991)

- Curler
- Born: February 1, 1991 (age 35); Seoul, South Korea

Team
- Curling club: Gyeonggi-do CC, Uijeongbu

Curling career
- Member Association: South Korea
- World Championship: 2 (2014, 2016)
- Pacific-Asia Championship: 3 (2013, 2015, 2019)
- Olympic: 1 (2014)
Medal record
Women's curling
Representing South Korea
Pacific-Asia Championships
Gold medal – first place	2013 Shanghai
Silver medal – second place	2015 Astana
Bronze medal – third place	2019 Shenzhen
Winter Universiade
Silver medal – second place	2013 Trentino
Representing Seoul
Korean Women's Championship
Silver medal – second place	2012 Uijeongbu
Bronze medal – third place	2011 Uijeongbu
Representing Gyeonggi
Korean Women's Championship
Gold medal – first place	2013 Chuncheon
Gold medal – first place	2015 Icheon
Gold medal – first place	2019 Gangneung
Bronze medal – third place	2016 Uiseong
Bronze medal – third place	2017 Icheon
Bronze medal – third place	2018 Jincheon

- Um Min-ji
- Hangul: 엄민지
- RR: Eom Minji
- MR: Ŏm Minji

Um Min-ji (born February 1, 1991, in Seoul, South Korea) is a South Korean curler from Uijeongbu. She was the alternate on the Kim Ji-sun team that represented South Korea at the 2014 Winter Olympics in Sochi, Russia.

== Career ==
Um competed at the 2014 Winter Olympics for South Korea. She teamed with Kim Ji-sun, Lee Seul-bee, Shin Mi-sung and Gim Un-chi in the women's tournament. She began the tournament as the alternate, but played lead in five of the team's last six games, as the South Korean team went 3–6 to finish in a tie for 8th. She curled 85%, which was 6th out of the 10 leads. Later that year, Um made her World Curling Championships debut at the 2014 World Women's Curling Championship. The team would have great success, finishing the round robin with a 8–3 record, tied for fourth. The team would win the tiebreaker 7–5 over Sweden's Margaretha Sigfridsson to qualify for the playoffs. After winning the 3 vs. 4 page playoff game 9–5 over Russia's Anna Sidorova, the team would lose the semi-final 7–2 to Switzerland's Binia Feltscher and then lost the bronze medal game 7–6 to the Russians, settling for fourth place. The following season, the team finished runner-up at the 2015 Pacific-Asia Curling Championships to Japan's Satsuki Fujisawa. The team played in the 2016 World Women's Curling Championship but would not be as successful as in 2014. They missed the playoffs with a 5–6 record.

Kim Ji-sun would leave the team the following season and the team added Seol Ye-eun. They would have a slow few seasons, failing to win the Korean National Championships and being replaced as the national team by Kim Eun-jung in 2017 and 2018 and Kim Min-ji in 2019. But in summer 2019, Team Gim would win the 2019 Korean Curling Championships after stealing two in the tenth end of the final against Kim Min-ji. To start their tour season, her team had a quarterfinal finish at the 2019 Cameron's Brewing Oakville Fall Classic. They followed this by missing the playoffs at the 2019 Stu Sells Oakville Tankard, a semifinal finish at the 2019 AMJ Campbell Shorty Jenkins Classic and winning the 2019 KW Fall Classic posting a perfect 7–0 record en route to capturing the title. At the 2019 Pacific-Asia Curling Championships, Team Gim had a disappointing finish. After going 6–1 in the round robin, they lost the semi-final to China's Han Yu. This performance meant they didn't qualify Korea for the 2020 World Championship through the Pacific region and would have to play in the World Qualification Event for their spot in the World's. Next Team Gim competed in the 2019 Boundary Ford Curling Classic where they lost in the final to Kim Min-ji. Two weeks later, they played in the Jim Sullivan Curling Classic in Saint John, New Brunswick, the same city where the team had success in 2014 at the World's. It was another successful run for the rink as they went 7–0 through the tournament to capture the title. The Gim rink went undefeated at the World Qualification Event, going 7–0 in the round robin and defeating Italy in the 1 vs. 2 playoff game to qualify South Korea for the World Championship. The team was set to represent South Korea at the 2020 World Women's Curling Championship before the event was cancelled due to the COVID-19 pandemic. The World Qualification Event would be their last event of the season as the remaining two events (the Players' Championship and the Champions Cup Grand Slam events) were also cancelled due to the pandemic.

Um left Team Gim to take over Team Oh Eun-jin for the 2020–21 season. The team competed at the 2020 Korean Curling Championships in November 2020, where they lost in the 3 vs. 4 playoff game to the Gim rink 8–6. Um left the team after the season to focus on mixed doubles and third Shin Ga-yeong took over skipping duties on the team.

== Education ==
- Sungshin Women's University
- Seoul Hyundai Senior High School
- Seoul Shingu Middle School
