= Lee Ki-bok =

South Korean curler (born 1995)

- Curler
- Born: July 18, 1995 (age 31)

Team
- Curling club: Gangwon Curling, Gangwon Province
- Skip: Park Jong-duk
- Third: Jeong Yeong-seok
- Second: Oh Seung-hoon
- Lead: Lee Ki-bok
- Alternate: Seong Ji-hoon

Curling career
- Member Association: South Korea
- World Championship: 2 (2018, 2024)
- Pacific-Asia Championship: 2 (2017, 2019)
- Pan Continental Championship: 1 (2023)
- Olympic: 1 (2018)
Medal record
Men's curling
Representing South Korea
Pan Continental Championships
Silver medal – second place	2023 Kelowna
Pacific-Asia Championships
Gold medal – first place	2017 Erina
Gold medal – first place	2019 Shenzhen
World Junior Curling Championships
Gold medal – first place	2017 Gangneung
Pacific-Asia Junior Curling Championships
Gold medal – first place	2015 Naseby
Representing Chuncheon
Korean Men's Championship
Bronze medal – third place	2013 Chuncheon
Representing Uiseong
Korean Men's Championship
Gold medal – first place	2017 Icheon
Gold medal – first place	2019 Gangneung
Silver medal – second place	2020 Gangneung
Representing Gangwon
Korean Men's Championship
Silver medal – second place	2021 Gangneung
Silver medal – second place	2024 Uijeongbu
Bronze medal – third place	2026 Uiseong
Korean Mixed Doubles Championship
Silver medal – second place	2024 Jincheon
Bronze medal – third place	2021 Jincheon

Lee Ki-bok (born 18 July 1995) is a South Korean curler. He competed in the 2018 Winter Olympics as the lead on the South Korean men's team skipped by Kim Chang-min.

== Personal life ==
Lee's brother Ki-jeong is also a curler.
