= 2022 Korean Curling Championships =

2022 KB Financial Korean Curling Championships
- Host city: Jincheon, South Korea
- Arena: Jincheon National Training Centre
- Dates: June 11–17
- Men's winner: Seoul City Hall
- Curling club: Seoul CC, Seoul
- Skip: Jeong Byeong-jin
- Third: Lee Jeong-jae
- Second: Kim Min-woo
- Lead: Kim Tae-hwan
- Coach: Yang Jae-bong
- Finalist: Gyeongbuk Sports Council (C. Kim)
- Women's winner: Chuncheon City Hall
- Curling club: Chuncheon CC, Chuncheon
- Skip: Ha Seung-youn
- Third: Kim Hye-rin
- Second: Yang Tae-i
- Lead: Kim Su-jin
- Coach: Lee Sung-jun
- Finalist: Gyeonggi Province (Gim)

The 2022 Korean Curling Championships (branded as the 2022 KB Financial Korean Curling Championships), Korea's national curling championships, were held from June 11 to 17 at the Jincheon National Training Centre in Jincheon, South Korea. The winning teams on both the men's and women's sides became the Korean National Teams for the 2022–23 curling season. They will represent Korea at the 2022 Pan-Continental Curling Championships and later the 2023 World Women's Curling Championship and 2023 World Men's Curling Championship if they reach qualification. Both the men's and women's events were played in a round robin format which qualified four teams for the playoffs.

Heading into the event, the men's side was headed by the champions of the 2021 Korean Curling Championships, Gyeongbuk Sports Council, which is skipped by Kim Chang-min. During their reign as national champions, the team won gold at the 2021 Pacific-Asia Curling Championships and finished in eighth place at the 2022 World Men's Curling Championship with a 6–6 record. They also represented Korea at the 2021 Olympic Qualification Event, finishing in eighth with a 2–6 record. Expected challengers for the 2022 national title were Gangwon Province (Jeong Yeong-seok), Gyeonggido Curling Federation (Kim Jeong-min), Seoul City Hall (Jeong Byeong-jin) and Kyungil University (Lee Jae-beom).

The 2021 national champions Gangneung City Hall (Kim Eun-jung) lead the women's field of the 2022 championship. After a silver medal finish at the 2021 Pacific-Asia Curling Championships, the team reached the final of the 2022 World Women's Curling Championship where they lost to Switzerland's Silvana Tirinzoni. At the 2021 Olympic Qualification Event, Gangneung City Hall were successful in qualifying for the 2022 Winter Olympics as they finished the event with a 7–3 record. At the Games, they placed eighth with a 4–5 record. Gyeonggi Province (Gim Eun-ji) and Chuncheon City Hall (Ha Seung-youn) challenged for the 2022 title.

== Summary ==
On the men's side, Seoul City Hall's team of Jeong Byeong-jin, Lee Jeong-jae, Kim Min-woo and Kim Tae-hwan won the title, defeating the reigning national champions Gyeongbuk Sports Council 7–3 in the final. Seoul City Hall went 6–1 through the round robin before winning both of their playoff matches to secure the title. The last time the team won the national title was in 2018.

The women's title was won by Chuncheon City Hall's Ha Seung-youn rink which defeated Gyeonggi Province's Gim Eun-ji 7–4 in the final. Ha, with Kim Hye-rin, Yang Tae-i and Kim Su-jin previously won the national title with former skip Kim Min-ji, who transferred to Gim's Gyeonggi Province team in March of 2022. Chuncheon City Hall went 5–1 in the round robin and then knocked off the reigning champions Gangneung City Hall's Kim Eun-jung team in the semifinal.

== Men ==
=== Teams ===
The teams are listed as follows:

Team	Skip	Third	Second	Lead	Alternate	Locale
Gangwon Province	Jeong Yeong-seok	Park Jong-duk	Oh Seung-hoon	Seong Ji-hoon		Gangwon
Gyeongbuk Sports Council	Kim Soo-hyuk (Fourth)	Kim Chang-min (Skip)	Seong Se-hyeon	Kim Hak-kyun	Jeon Jae-ik	Uiseong
Gyeonggido Curling Federation	Kim Jeong-min	Kim San	Choi Chi-won	Park Se-won	Kwon Dong-keun	Gyeonggi-do
Kyungil University	Lee Jae-beom	Kim Eun-bin	Kim Hyo-jun	Pyo Jeong-min	Kim Jin-hoon	Daegu
Seoul City Hall	Jeong Byeong-jin	Lee Jeong-jae	Kim Min-woo	Kim Tae-hwan		Seoul
Seoul Physical Education High School	Kang Min-jun	Lee Ji-hoon	Lee Hee-song	Song Ye-song		Seoul
Uijeongbu High School	Yang Woo-jin	Jeong Hyun-wook	Kim Min-sang	Kim Hong-geon	Kim Ye-chan	Uijeongbu
Uiseong High School	Lee Jun-hwa	Kim Dae-hyeon	Kwon Jun-seo	Kim Min-je	Park Seong-min	Uiseong

=== Round-robin standings ===
Final round-robin standings

Key
Teams to Playoffs

Team	Skip	W	L	W–L	PF	PA	EW	EL	BE	SE	DSC
Gyeongbuk Sports Council	Kim Chang-min	6	1	1–0	56	22	30	19	3	11	46.80
Seoul City Hall	Jeong Byeong-jin	6	1	0–1	45	32	25	25	4	7	48.10
Gangwon Province	Jeong Yeong-seok	5	2	–	50	34	27	23	6	9	29.60
Gyeonggido Curling Federation	Kim Jeong-min	4	3	–	57	40	32	21	4	13	29.70
Kyungil University	Lee Jae-beom	3	4	–	39	46	28	25	5	10	48.70
Uijeongbu High School	Yang Woo-jin	2	5	1–0	33	46	22	28	3	4	46.50
Seoul PE High School	Kang Min-jun	2	5	0–1	36	64	25	34	2	5	49.40
Uiseong High School	Lee Jun-hwa	0	7	–	29	61	18	32	5	3	57.20

=== Round-robin results ===
All draws are listed in Korea Standard Time (UTC+09:00).

==== Draw 2 ====
Saturday, June 11, 14:00

Sheet A	1	2	3	4	5	6	7	8	9	10	Final
Kyungil University (J. B. Lee)	0	0	2	0	2	0	0	X	X	X	4
Gyeonggido Curling Federation (J. Kim) 🔨	2	3	0	3	0	0	4	X	X	X	12

Sheet B	1	2	3	4	5	6	7	8	9	10	Final
Uijeongbu High School (Yang)	0	0	1	0	1	0	0	0	1	X	3
Seoul City Hall (B. Jeong) 🔨	0	2	0	1	0	1	0	2	0	X	6

Sheet C	1	2	3	4	5	6	7	8	9	10	Final
Uiseong High School (J. H. Lee) 🔨	0	0	1	0	0	2	0	1	X	X	4
Gangwon Province (Y. Jeong)	0	3	0	5	2	0	1	0	X	X	11

Sheet D	1	2	3	4	5	6	7	8	9	10	Final
Gyeongbuk Sports Council (C. Kim) 🔨	2	2	0	1	0	1	0	1	1	X	8
Seoul PE High School (Kang)	0	0	1	0	1	0	1	0	0	X	3

==== Draw 4 ====
Sunday, June 12, 9:00

Sheet A	1	2	3	4	5	6	7	8	9	10	Final
Seoul PE High School (Kang)	0	0	2	0	1	0	1	0	0	X	4
Gangwon Province (Y. Jeong) 🔨	0	2	0	3	0	1	0	1	2	X	9

Sheet B	1	2	3	4	5	6	7	8	9	10	Final
Gyeongbuk Sports Council (C. Kim) 🔨	3	0	2	0	0	2	0	1	X	X	8
Gyeonggido Curling Federation (J. Kim)	0	0	0	2	1	0	0	0	X	X	3

Sheet C	1	2	3	4	5	6	7	8	9	10	Final
Seoul City Hall (B. Jeong)	0	0	0	2	0	0	2	0	3	0	7
Kyungil University (J. B. Lee) 🔨	0	1	1	0	0	1	0	1	0	2	6

Sheet D	1	2	3	4	5	6	7	8	9	10	Final
Uiseong High School (J. H. Lee)	0	0	0	1	0	0	2	0	X	X	3
Uijeongbu High School (Yang) 🔨	0	1	1	0	1	1	0	4	X	X	8

==== Draw 6 ====
Sunday, June 12, 19:00

Sheet A	1	2	3	4	5	6	7	8	9	10	Final
Seoul City Hall (B. Jeong)	0	0	3	0	1	0	1	0	1	X	6
Uiseong High School (J. H. Lee) 🔨	0	1	0	0	0	0	0	1	0	X	2

Sheet B	1	2	3	4	5	6	7	8	9	10	Final
Kyungil University (J. B. Lee)	0	0	0	2	0	0	0	3	1	1	7
Seoul PE High School (Kang) 🔨	0	2	1	0	3	1	1	0	0	0	8

Sheet C	1	2	3	4	5	6	7	8	9	10	Final
Uijeongbu High School (Yang)	0	2	0	0	0	1	0	X	X	X	3
Gyeongbuk Sports Council (C. Kim) 🔨	4	0	3	1	2	0	3	X	X	X	13

Sheet D	1	2	3	4	5	6	7	8	9	10	Final
Gyeonggido Curling Federation (J. Kim)	1	0	0	1	1	0	1	1	1	0	6
Gangwon Province (Y. Jeong) 🔨	0	1	3	0	0	3	0	0	0	1	8

==== Draw 8 ====
Monday, June 13, 14:00

Sheet A	1	2	3	4	5	6	7	8	9	10	Final
Gangwon Province (Y. Jeong) 🔨	0	4	1	0	0	3	0	0	X	X	8
Uijeongbu High School (Yang)	0	0	0	1	0	0	1	0	X	X	2

Sheet B	1	2	3	4	5	6	7	8	9	10	Final
Uiseong High School (J. H. Lee) 🔨	0	2	0	0	2	0	0	0	0	X	4
Gyeonggido Curling Federation (J. Kim)	0	0	4	2	0	0	1	1	2	X	10

Sheet C	1	2	3	4	5	6	7	8	9	10	Final
Seoul PE High School (Kang) 🔨	1	0	1	0	0	1	0	0	0	X	3
Seoul City Hall (B. Jeong)	0	2	0	2	1	0	2	1	1	X	9

Sheet D	1	2	3	4	5	6	7	8	9	10	Final
Kyungil University (J. B. Lee) 🔨	2	0	0	1	1	0	0	1	0	1	6
Gyeongbuk Sports Council (C. Kim)	0	1	0	0	0	1	0	0	1	0	3

==== Draw 10 ====
Tuesday, June 14, 9:00

Sheet A	1	2	3	4	5	6	7	8	9	10	Final
Gyeongbuk Sports Council (C. Kim)	2	1	0	2	1	2	X	X	X	X	8
Seoul City Hall (B. Jeong) 🔨	0	0	1	0	0	0	X	X	X	X	1

Sheet B	1	2	3	4	5	6	7	8	9	10	Final
Gangwon Province (Y. Jeong) 🔨	2	0	0	0	1	1	2	1	X	X	7
Kyungil University (J. B. Lee)	0	0	1	0	0	0	0	0	X	X	1

Sheet C	1	2	3	4	5	6	7	8	9	10	Final
Uijeongbu High School (Yang) 🔨	1	0	0	1	0	2	0	0	0	X	4
Gyeonggido Curling Federation (J. Kim)	0	1	1	0	1	0	1	1	1	X	6

Sheet D	1	2	3	4	5	6	7	8	9	10	Final
Seoul PE High School (Kang) 🔨	0	2	0	1	3	0	0	2	1	X	9
Uiseong High School (J. H. Lee)	0	0	1	0	0	3	2	0	0	X	6

==== Draw 12 ====
Tuesday, June 14, 19:00

Sheet A	1	2	3	4	5	6	7	8	9	10	Final
Uiseong High School (J. H. Lee) 🔨	1	0	3	0	3	0	0	0	0	X	7
Kyungil University (J. B. Lee)	0	2	0	2	0	2	1	1	1	X	9

Sheet B	1	2	3	4	5	6	7	8	9	10	Final
Uijeongbu High School (Yang) 🔨	4	0	2	2	0	1	0	2	X	X	11
Seoul PE High School (Kang)	0	1	0	0	1	0	2	0	X	X	4

Sheet C	1	2	3	4	5	6	7	8	9	10	Final
Gangwon Province (Y. Jeong)	0	0	1	0	1	0	0	1	0	X	3
Gyeongbuk Sports Council (C. Kim) 🔨	2	0	0	2	0	0	1	0	3	X	8

Sheet D	1	2	3	4	5	6	7	8	9	10	Final
Gyeonggido Curling Federation (J. Kim) 🔨	1	0	1	0	0	2	0	0	2	0	6
Seoul City Hall (B. Jeong)	0	4	0	0	2	0	0	1	0	0	7

==== Draw 14 ====
Wednesday, June 15, 14:00

Sheet A	1	2	3	4	5	6	7	8	9	10	Final
Gyeonggido Curling Federation (J. Kim) 🔨	4	1	0	2	0	4	0	3	X	X	14
Seoul PE High School (Kang)	0	0	1	0	2	0	2	0	X	X	5

Sheet B	1	2	3	4	5	6	7	8	9	10	Final
Seoul City Hall (B. Jeong) 🔨	2	2	0	0	1	0	4	X	X	X	9
Gangwon Province (Y. Jeong)	0	0	2	1	0	1	0	X	X	X	4

Sheet C	1	2	3	4	5	6	7	8	9	10	Final
Kyungil University (J. B. Lee) 🔨	1	1	0	1	0	0	2	1	X	X	6
Uijeongbu High School (Yang)	0	0	0	0	1	1	0	0	X	X	2

Sheet D	1	2	3	4	5	6	7	8	9	10	Final
Gyeongbuk Sports Council (C. Kim) 🔨	0	0	2	0	0	0	1	5	X	X	8
Uiseong High School (J. H. Lee)	0	0	0	1	1	1	0	0	X	X	3

=== Playoffs ===
Semifinals
1	Gyeongbuk Sports Council	7
4	Gyeonggido Curling Federation	4
2	Seoul City Hall	7
3	Gangwon Province	3

Final
1	Gyeongbuk Sports Council	3
2	Seoul City Hall	7
Bronze place game
4	Gyeonggido Curling Federation	3
3	Gangwon Province	9

==== Semifinals ====
Thursday, June 16, 14:00

Sheet B	1	2	3	4	5	6	7	8	9	10	Final
Seoul City Hall (B. Jeong) 🔨	0	0	0	1	1	2	3	0	X	X	7
Gangwon Province (Y. Jeong)	0	0	1	0	0	0	0	2	X	X	3

Sheet C	1	2	3	4	5	6	7	8	9	10	Final
Gyeongbuk Sports Council (C. Kim) 🔨	2	0	2	0	0	2	0	0	1	X	7
Gyeonggido Curling Federation (J. Kim)	0	1	0	2	0	0	0	1	0	X	4

==== Bronze medal game ====
Thursday, June 16, 19:00

Sheet D	1	2	3	4	5	6	7	8	9	10	Final
Gyeonggido Curling Federation (J. Kim)	0	0	1	0	1	0	1	0	X	X	3
Gangwon Province (Y. Jeong) 🔨	1	0	0	3	0	2	0	3	X	X	9

==== Gold medal game ====
Friday, June 17, 14:00

Sheet B	1	2	3	4	5	6	7	8	9	10	Final
Gyeongbuk Sports Council (C. Kim) 🔨	0	0	0	2	0	1	0	0	0	X	3
Seoul City Hall (B. Jeong)	0	0	0	0	2	0	1	3	1	X	7

2022 Korean Curling Championships
(South Korea)
Jeong Byeong-jin
2nd Korean Championship title

=== Final standings ===
Place	Team	Skip
1st place, gold medalist(s)	Seoul City Hall	Jeong Byeong-jin
2nd place, silver medalist(s)	Gyeongbuk Sports Council	Kim Chang-min
3rd place, bronze medalist(s)	Gangwon Province	Jeong Yeong-seok
4	Gyeonggido Curling Federation	Kim Jeong-min
5	Kyungil University	Lee Jae-beom
6	Uijeongbu High School	Yang Woo-jin
7	Seoul Physical Education High School	Kang Min-jun
8	Uiseong High School	Lee Jun-hwa

== Women ==
=== Teams ===
The teams are listed as follows:

Team	Skip	Third	Second	Lead	Alternate	Locale
Bongmyeong High School	Kim Min-seo	Park Seo-jin	Shim Yu-jeong	Song Da-bin	Jeong Anah	Cheongju
Chuncheon City Hall	Ha Seung-youn	Kim Hye-rin	Yang Tae-i	Kim Su-jin		Chuncheon
Gangneung City Hall	Kim Eun-jung	Kim Kyeong-ae	Kim Cho-hi	Kim Seon-yeong	Kim Yeong-mi	Gangneung
Gyeonggi Province	Gim Eun-ji	Kim Min-ji	Kim Su-ji	Seol Ye-eun	Seol Ye-ji	Uijeongbu
Jeonbuk Province	Shin Ga-yeong	Lee Ji-yeong	Song Yu-jin	Shin Eun-jin		Jeonbuk
Songhyun High School	Kang Bo-bae	Choi Ye-jin	Park Han-byul	Jo Ju-hee	Kim Na-yeon	Uijeongbu
Uiseong Girls High School	Bang Yu-jin	Oh Ji-hyeon	Kim Hae-jeong	Kim Chae-rin	Park Ye-rin	Uiseong

=== Round-robin standings ===
Final round-robin standings

Key
Teams to Playoffs

Team	Skip	W	L	W–L	PF	PA	EW	EL	BE	SE	DSC
Gyeonggi Province	Gim Eun-ji	5	1	1–1	53	25	31	16	3	14	25.40
Chuncheon City Hall	Ha Seung-youn	5	1	1–1	49	27	31	15	5	15	34.40
Gangneung City Hall	Kim Eun-jung	5	1	1–1	48	34	28	24	2	8	35.90
Jeonbuk Province	Shin Ga-yeong	2	4	1–0	39	45	24	29	3	8	34.80
Songhyun High School	Kang Bo-bae	2	4	0–1	31	51	20	30	2	6	41.40
Uiseong Girls High School	Bang Yu-jin	1	5	1–0	23	48	17	29	3	3	76.40
Bongmyeong High School	Kim Min-seo	1	5	0–1	33	46	20	28	7	3	50.30

=== Round-robin results ===
All draws are listed in Korea Standard Time (UTC+09:00).

==== Draw 1 ====
Saturday, June 11, 9:00

Sheet A	1	2	3	4	5	6	7	8	9	10	Final
Chuncheon City Hall (Ha) 🔨	0	4	0	3	0	1	1	3	X	X	12
Uiseong Girls High School (Bang)	0	0	2	0	0	0	0	0	X	X	2

Sheet C	1	2	3	4	5	6	7	8	9	10	11	Final
Jeonbuk Province (Shin)	0	0	4	0	1	2	0	1	0	0	0	8
Bongmyeong High School (M. Kim) 🔨	1	0	0	3	0	0	2	0	1	1	1	9

Sheet D	1	2	3	4	5	6	7	8	9	10	Final
Gyeonggi Province (Gim) 🔨	1	0	0	2	0	2	3	0	0	2	10
Songhyun High School (Kang)	0	1	1	0	1	0	0	2	2	0	7

==== Draw 3 ====
Saturday, June 11, 19:00

Sheet B	1	2	3	4	5	6	7	8	9	10	Final
Songhyun High School (Kang) 🔨	2	1	0	0	1	1	0	2	0	0	7
Bongmyeong High School (M. Kim)	0	0	3	1	0	0	0	0	2	0	6

Sheet C	1	2	3	4	5	6	7	8	9	10	Final
Gangneung City Hall (E. Kim)	0	0	1	0	3	1	1	0	0	X	6
Chuncheon City Hall (Ha) 🔨	1	0	0	1	0	0	0	0	1	X	3

Sheet D	1	2	3	4	5	6	7	8	9	10	Final
Uiseong Girls High School (Bang) 🔨	1	0	1	0	1	0	0	0	1	0	4
Jeonbuk Province (Shin)	0	1	0	1	0	2	1	1	0	1	7

==== Draw 5 ====
Sunday, June 12, 14:00

Sheet A	1	2	3	4	5	6	7	8	9	10	Final
Jeonbuk Province (Shin)	0	0	0	0	1	0	0	0	X	X	1
Gyeonggi Province (Gim) 🔨	0	2	2	1	0	3	1	1	X	X	10

Sheet B	1	2	3	4	5	6	7	8	9	10	Final
Uiseong Girls High School (Bang) 🔨	0	0	1	0	0	2	0	2	0	1	6
Gangneung City Hall (E. Kim)	2	0	0	1	1	0	2	0	2	0	8

Sheet D	1	2	3	4	5	6	7	8	9	10	Final
Bongmyeong High School (M. Kim) 🔨	0	1	0	0	1	0	2	0	3	0	7
Chuncheon City Hall (Ha)	0	0	2	1	0	3	0	1	0	2	9

==== Draw 7 ====
Monday, June 13, 9:00

Sheet A	1	2	3	4	5	6	7	8	9	10	Final
Gangneung City Hall (E. Kim) 🔨	1	2	0	1	2	0	2	0	2	X	10
Songhyun High School (Kang)	0	0	1	0	0	2	0	1	0	X	4

Sheet B	1	2	3	4	5	6	7	8	9	10	Final
Chuncheon City Hall (Ha) 🔨	0	1	2	1	0	2	1	1	0	1	9
Jeonbuk Province (Shin)	0	0	0	0	3	0	0	0	3	0	6

Sheet C	1	2	3	4	5	6	7	8	9	10	Final
Gyeonggi Province (Gim) 🔨	1	2	2	1	4	1	X	X	X	X	11
Uiseong Girls High School (Bang)	0	0	0	0	0	0	X	X	X	X	0

==== Draw 9 ====
Monday, June 13, 19:00

Sheet B	1	2	3	4	5	6	7	8	9	10	Final
Bongmyeong High School (M. Kim)	0	0	2	0	0	0	0	2	0	X	4
Gyeonggi Province (Gim) 🔨	0	1	0	1	0	2	1	0	2	X	7

Sheet C	1	2	3	4	5	6	7	8	9	10	Final
Jeonbuk Province (Shin) 🔨	0	3	1	0	1	0	1	0	1	0	7
Gangneung City Hall (E. Kim)	1	0	0	1	0	1	0	4	0	1	8

Sheet D	1	2	3	4	5	6	7	8	9	10	Final
Songhyun High School (Kang) 🔨	1	0	0	1	1	0	0	3	0	1	7
Uiseong Girls High School (Bang)	0	0	1	0	0	1	2	0	1	0	5

==== Draw 11 ====
Tuesday, June 14, 14:00

Sheet A	1	2	3	4	5	6	7	8	9	10	Final
Uiseong Girls High School (Bang)	0	0	0	0	2	0	2	1	0	1	6
Bongmyeong High School (M. Kim) 🔨	0	0	0	1	0	2	0	0	0	0	3

Sheet C	1	2	3	4	5	6	7	8	9	10	Final
Chuncheon City Hall (Ha)	0	1	2	1	1	4	0	1	X	X	10
Songhyun High School (Kang) 🔨	0	0	0	0	0	0	1	0	X	X	1

Sheet D	1	2	3	4	5	6	7	8	9	10	Final
Gangneung City Hall (E. Kim)	0	2	0	0	0	2	0	0	3	0	7
Gyeonggi Province (Gim) 🔨	3	0	1	1	2	0	1	0	0	2	10

==== Draw 13 ====
Wednesday, June 15, 9:00

Sheet A	1	2	3	4	5	6	7	8	9	10	11	Final
Gyeonggi Province (Gim) 🔨	0	0	1	0	0	0	0	2	0	2	0	5
Chuncheon City Hall (Ha)	0	1	0	0	0	1	2	0	1	0	1	6

Sheet B	1	2	3	4	5	6	7	8	9	10	Final
Songhyun High School (Kang)	0	0	5	0	0	0	0	0	0	X	5
Jeonbuk Province (Shin) 🔨	0	1	0	0	2	3	1	2	1	X	10

Sheet C	1	2	3	4	5	6	7	8	9	10	Final
Bongmyeong High School (M. Kim)	0	1	0	2	0	0	1	0	X	X	4
Gangneung City Hall (E. Kim) 🔨	2	0	1	0	3	1	0	2	X	X	9

=== Playoffs ===
Semifinals
1	Gyeonggi Province	9
4	Jeonbuk Province	5
2	Chuncheon City Hall	7
3	Gangneung City Hall	5

Final
1	Gyeonggi Province	4
2	Chuncheon City Hall	7
Bronze place game
4	Jeonbuk Province	8
3	Gangneung City Hall	7

==== Semifinals ====
Thursday, June 16, 9:00

Sheet B	1	2	3	4	5	6	7	8	9	10	Final
Gyeonggi Province (Gim) 🔨	1	0	4	0	1	0	3	0	0	X	9
Jeonbuk Province (Shin)	0	1	0	1	0	1	0	1	1	X	5

Sheet C	1	2	3	4	5	6	7	8	9	10	Final
Chuncheon City Hall (Ha)	0	1	0	0	1	0	1	3	1	0	7
Gangneung City Hall (E. Kim) 🔨	0	0	0	1	0	2	0	0	0	2	5

==== Bronze medal game ====
Thursday, June 16, 19:00

Sheet B	1	2	3	4	5	6	7	8	9	10	Final
Jeonbuk Province (Shin)	0	3	0	1	0	3	1	0	0	0	8
Gangneung City Hall (E. Kim) 🔨	0	0	1	0	2	0	0	1	2	1	7

==== Gold medal game ====
Friday, June 17, 9:00

Sheet B	1	2	3	4	5	6	7	8	9	10	Final
Gyeonggi Province (Gim)	0	0	0	2	0	0	1	0	1	0	4
Chuncheon City Hall (Ha) 🔨	2	0	0	0	0	0	0	2	0	3	7

2022 Korean Curling Championships
(South Korea)
Ha Seung-youn
1st Korean Championship title

=== Final standings ===
Place	Team	Skip
1st place, gold medalist(s)	Chuncheon City Hall	Ha Seung-youn
2nd place, silver medalist(s)	Gyeonggi Province	Gim Eun-ji
3rd place, bronze medalist(s)	Jeonbuk Province	Shin Ga-yeong
4	Gangneung City Hall	Kim Eun-jung
5	Songhyun High School	Kang Bo-bae
6	Uiseong Girls High School	Bang Yu-jin
7	Bongmyeong High School	Kim Min-seo

== See also ==
- 2022 Korean Mixed Doubles Curling Championship
