= Seong Se-hyeon =

South Korean curler

- Curler
- Born: December 2, 1990 (age 35); Gumi, Gyeongsangbuk-do, South Korea

Team
- Curling club: Uiseong CC, Uiseong; Gyeongsangbukdo Sports Council

Curling career
- Member Association: South Korea
- World Championship: 2 (2018, 2022)
- Pacific-Asia Championship: 7 (2009, 2011, 2012, 2017)
- Olympic: 1 (2018)
Medal record
Men's curling
Representing South Korea
Pacific-Asia Championships
Gold medal – first place	2017 Erina
Bronze medal – third place	2009 Karuizawa
Bronze medal – third place	2011 Nanjing
Winter Universiade
Gold medal – first place	2011 Erzurum
Representing Uiseong
Korean Men's Championship
Gold medal – first place	2011 Uijeongbu
Gold medal – first place	2012 Uijeongbu
Gold medal – first place	2017 Icheon
Silver medal – second place	2013 Chuncheon
Silver medal – second place	2014 Chongju
Silver medal – second place	2016 Uiseong
Silver medal – second place	2022 Jincheon
Bronze medal – third place	2015 Icheon

Seong Se-hyeon (born December 2, 1990) is a South Korean curler. He competed in the 2018 Winter Olympics as the third on the South Korean men's team skipped by Kim Chang-min.
