= Lee Ki-jeong =

South Korean curler

- Curler
- Born: July 18, 1995 (age 31)

Team
- Curling club: Seoul CC, Seoul, KOR
- Mixed doubles partner: Lee Bo-young

Curling career
- Member Association: South Korea
- World Mixed Doubles Championship: 4 (2016, 2017, 2018, 2022)
- Pacific-Asia Championship: 1 (2019)
- Olympic: 1 (2018)
Medal record
Men's curling
Representing South Korea
Pacific-Asia Championships
Gold medal – first place	2019 Shenzhen
World Junior Championships
Gold medal – first place	2017 Gangneung
Pacific-Asia Junior Championships
Gold medal – first place	2015 Naseby
Representing Chuncheon
Korean Men's Championship
Bronze medal – third place	2013 Chuncheon
Representing Gyeongbuk
Korean Mixed Doubles Championship
Gold medal – first place	2016 Uiseong
Gold medal – first place	2017 Icheon
Representing Uiseong
Korean Men's Championship
Gold medal – first place	2019 Gangneung
Silver medal – second place	2020 Gangneung
Representing Gangwon
Korean Men's Championship
Silver medal – second place	2021 Gangneung
Korean Mixed Doubles Championship
Gold medal – first place	2021 Jincheon
Representing Seoul
Korean Men's Championship
Silver medal – second place	2025 Uijeongbu

- Lee Ki-jeong
- Hangul: 이기정
- Hanja: 李基政
- RR: I Gijeong
- MR: I Kijŏng

Lee Ki-jeong (born 18 July 1995) is a South Korean curler. He competed in the 2018 Winter Olympics as part of the mixed doubles team with partner Jang Hye-ji. In 2021, he won the 2021 Korean Mixed Doubles Curling Championship with partner Kim Min-ji.

== Personal life ==
Lee's brother Ki-bok is also a curler.
