= Lee Seul-bee =

South Korean curler (born 1988)

- Curler
- Born: June 25, 1988 (age 38); North Gyeongsang Province, South Korea

Curling career
- Member Association: South Korea
- World Championship: 5 (2009, 2011, 2012, 2014, 2016)
- Pacific-Asia Championship: 6 (2005, 2008, 2010, 2011, 2013, 2015)
- Olympic: 1 (2014)
Medal record
Women's curling
Representing South Korea
Pacific-Asia Championships
Gold medal – first place	2010 Uiseong
Gold medal – first place	2013 Shanghai
Silver medal – second place	2008 Naseby
Silver medal – second place	2011 Nanjing
Silver medal – second place	2015 Almaty
Bronze medal – third place	2005 Taipei
Winter Universiade
Silver medal – second place	2013 Trentino
Bronze medal – third place	2011 Erzurum
Representing Gyeonggi
Korean Women's Championship
Gold medal – first place	2011 Uijeongbu
Gold medal – first place	2013 Chuncheon
Gold medal – first place	2015 Icheon
Bronze medal – third place	2012 Uijeongbu
Bronze medal – third place	2016 Uiseong
Bronze medal – third place	2017 Icheon

Lee Seul-bee (born June 25, 1988 in North Gyeongsang Province) is a South Korean curler and curling coach from Gyeonggi Province. She played third for the Kim Ji-sun team representing South Korea at the 2014 Winter Olympics in Sochi, Russia. She currently coaches the Uiseong-gun Office women's team.

== Personal life ==
Lee married Bak Seong-jun (박성준) in a ceremony in Seoul in June 2014. She attended Korea National Open University.
