= 2018 Humpty's Champions Cup =

Grand Slam of Curling event

- Host city: Calgary, Alberta
- Arena: WinSport Arena, Canada Olympic Park, Calgary, AB
- Dates: April 24–29, 2018
- Men's winner: (Newfoundland and Labrador) Brad Gushue
- Curling club: Bally Haly G&CC, St. John's
- Skip: Brad Gushue
- Third: Mark Nichols
- Second: Brett Gallant
- Lead: Geoff Walker
- Coach: Jules Owchar
- Finalist: (Ontario) Glenn Howard
- Women's winner: (Manitoba) Rachel Homan
- Curling club: Ottawa Curling Club, Ottawa
- Skip: Rachel Homan
- Third: Emma Miskew
- Second: Joanne Courtney
- Lead: Lisa Weagle
- Coach: Adam Kingsbury
- Finalist: (Manitoba) Kerri Einarson

The 2018 Humpty's Champions Cup is the final Grand Slam of curling event of the 2017–18 curling season. It was held April 24–29, 2018 at the WinSport Arena, Canada Olympic Park, in Calgary, Alberta.

== Men ==
=== Teams ===
The teams are listed as follows:

Skip	Third	Second	Lead	Locale
Kurt Balderston	Karsten Sturmay	Rob Bucholz	Del Shaughnessy	Grande Prairie, Alberta
Brendan Bottcher	Darren Moulding	Brad Thiessen	Karrick Martin	Edmonton, Alberta
Reid Carruthers	John Morris	Derek Samagalski	Colin Hodgson	Winnipeg, Manitoba
Niklas Edin	Oskar Eriksson	Rasmus Wranå	Christoffer Sundgren	Karlstad, Sweden
Colton Flasch	Kevin Marsh	Dan Marsh	Dallan Muyres	Saskatoon, Saskatchewan
Jason Gunnlaugson	Alex Forrest	Matt Dunstone	Connor Njegovan	Winnipeg, Manitoba
Brad Gushue	Mark Nichols	Brett Gallant	Geoff Walker	St. John's, Newfoundland and Labrador
Glenn Howard	Adam Spencer	David Mathers	Scott Howard	Tiny, Ontario
Brad Jacobs	Ryan Fry	E. J. Harnden	Ryan Harnden	Sault Ste. Marie, Ontario
Kevin Koe	Marc Kennedy	Brent Laing	Ben Hebert	Calgary, Alberta
Mike McEwen	B. J. Neufeld	Matt Wozniak	Denni Neufeld	Winnipeg, Manitoba
Bruce Mouat	Grant Hardie	Bobby Lammie	Hammy McMillan Jr.	Edinburgh, Scotland
Greg Persinger (Fourth)	Rich Ruohonen (Skip)	Colin Hufman	Phil Tilker	(United States) Minneapolis, Minnesota
Marc Pfister	Dominik Märki	Raphael Märki	Simon Gempeler	Adelboden, Switzerland
Tyler Tardi	Sterling Middleton	Jordan Tardi	Jacques Gauthier	Langley, British Columbia

=== Round-robin standings ===
Pool A	W	L	PF	PA	SO#
(Scotland) Bruce Mouat	4	0	32	18	3
(Alberta) Brendan Bottcher	3	1	28	21	13
(Saskatchewan) Colton Flasch	2	2	18	20	8
(Sweden) Niklas Edin	1	3	20	25	12
(Switzerland) Marc Pfister	0	4	12	26	15

Pool B	W	L	PF	PA	SO#
(Newfoundland and Labrador) Brad Gushue	4	0	27	12	1
(United States) Rich Ruohonen	2	2	18	17	6
(Ontario) Brad Jacobs	2	2	26	15	7
(Manitoba) Reid Carruthers	1	3	18	28	4
(British Columbia) Tyler Tardi	1	3	12	29	5

Pool C	W	L	PF	PA	SO#
(Ontario) Glenn Howard	3	1	26	19	2
(Alberta) Kevin Koe	3	1	19	16	9
(Manitoba) Mike McEwen	2	2	19	21	10
(Manitoba) Jason Gunnlaugson	2	2	22	18	11
(Alberta) Kurt Balderston	0	4	16	28	14

=== Tiebreakers ===
Sheet D	1	2	3	4	5	6	7	8	Final
(Ontario) Brad Jacobs 🔨	0	0	1	0	1	1	0	0	3
(Manitoba) Jason Gunnlaugson	1	1	0	1	0	0	0	1	4

Sheet E	1	2	3	4	5	6	7	8	Final
(Saskatchewan) Colton Flasch	0	1	0	1	0	1	0	0	3
(Manitoba) Mike McEwen 🔨	2	0	1	0	0	0	2	1	6

=== Playoffs ===
Quarterfinals
1	(Newfoundland and Labrador) Brad Gushue	4
8	(Manitoba) Jason Gunnlaugson	2
4	(Alberta) Kevin Koe	5
5	(Alberta) Brendan Bottcher	2
2	(Scotland) Bruce Mouat	7
7	(Manitoba) Mike McEwen	6
3	(Ontario) Glenn Howard	7
6	(United States) Rich Ruohonen	6

Semifinals
1	(Newfoundland and Labrador) Brad Gushue	7
4	(Alberta) Kevin Koe	5
2	(Scotland) Bruce Mouat	5
3	(Ontario) Glenn Howard	9

Final
1	(Newfoundland and Labrador) Brad Gushue	8
3	(Ontario) Glenn Howard	2

==== Quarterfinals ====
April 28, 4:00pm

Sheet B	1	2	3	4	5	6	7	8	Final
(Newfoundland and Labrador) Brad Gushue 🔨	1	0	0	0	0	2	0	1	4
(Manitoba) Jason Gunnlaugson	0	0	1	0	0	0	1	0	2

Sheet C	1	2	3	4	5	6	7	8	9	Final
(Scotland) Bruce Mouat 🔨	0	0	3	0	0	2	1	0	1	7
(Manitoba) Mike McEwen	3	1	0	0	1	0	0	1	0	6

Sheet D	1	2	3	4	5	6	7	8	Final
(Ontario) Glenn Howard 🔨	1	0	0	2	0	2	0	2	7
(United States) Rich Ruohonen	0	2	1	0	0	0	3	0	6

Sheet E	1	2	3	4	5	6	7	8	Final
(Alberta) Kevin Koe 🔨	1	1	0	1	0	2	0	X	5
(Alberta) Brendan Bottcher	0	0	0	0	1	0	1	X	2

==== Semifinals ====
April 28, 8:00pm

Sheet B	1	2	3	4	5	6	7	8	Final
(Scotland) Bruce Mouat 🔨	2	2	0	1	0	0	0	X	5
(Ontario) Glenn Howard	0	0	4	0	4	1	0	X	9

Sheet C	1	2	3	4	5	6	7	8	Final
(Newfoundland and Labrador) Brad Gushue 🔨	2	0	2	0	0	0	2	1	7
(Alberta) Kevin Koe	0	2	0	2	1	0	0	0	5

==== Final ====
April 29, 2:00pm

Sheet C	1	2	3	4	5	6	7	8	Final
(Newfoundland and Labrador) Brad Gushue 🔨	0	0	1	1	0	3	3	X	8
(Ontario) Glenn Howard	0	1	0	0	1	0	0	X	2

== Women ==
=== Teams ===
The teams are listed as follows:

Skip	Third	Second	Lead	Locale
Chelsea Carey	Cathy Overton-Clapham	Jocelyn Peterman	Laine Peters	Calgary, Alberta
Janais DeJong (Fourth)	Delia DeJong (Skip)	Kayla Skrlik	Amy Janko	Grande Prairie, Alberta
Kerri Einarson	Selena Kaatz	Liz Fyfe	Kristin MacCuish	Winnipeg, Manitoba
Binia Feltscher	Carole Howald	Franziska Kaufmann	Larissa Hari	Flims, Switzerland
Chinami Yoshida (Note: Chinami Yoshida moved up from third to skip Team Fujisawa as Satsuki Fujisawa was playing in the 2018 World Mixed Doubles Curling Championship. Alternate Mari Motohashi stepped in to play third.)	Mari Motohashi	Yumi Suzuki	Yurika Yoshida	(Japan) Kitami, Hokkaido
Anna Hasselborg	Sara McManus	Agnes Knochenhauer	Sofia Mabergs	Sundbyberg, Sweden
Rachel Homan	Emma Miskew	Joanne Courtney	Lisa Weagle	Ottawa, Ontario
Jennifer Jones	Kaitlyn Lawes	Jill Officer	Dawn McEwen	Winnipeg, Manitoba
Kaitlyn Jones	Karlee Burgess	Lauren Lenentine	Lindsey Burgess	Halifax, Nova Scotia
Kristen MacDiarmid	Marie Christianson	Liz Woodworth	Julia Colter	Halifax, Nova Scotia
Eve Muirhead	Anna Sloan	Vicki Adams	Lauren Gray	Stirling, Scotland
Alina Pätz	Nadine Lehmann	Marisa Winkelhausen	Nicole Schwägli	Baden, Switzerland
Jamie Sinclair	Alex Carlson	Vicky Persinger	Monica Walker	(United States) Blaine, Minnesota
Val Sweeting	Lori Olson-Johns	Dana Ferguson	Rachelle Brown	Edmonton, Alberta
Silvana Tirinzoni	Esther Neuenschwander	Manuela Siegrist	Marlene Albrecht	Aarau, Switzerland

=== Round-robin standings ===
Pool A	W	L	PF	PA	SO#
(Switzerland) Silvana Tirinzoni	3	1	24	14	1
(Manitoba) Kerri Einarson	3	1	27	15	2
(Manitoba) Jennifer Jones	2	2	22	22	4
(Alberta) Val Sweeting	2	2	16	22	14
(Nova Scotia) Kaitlyn Jones	0	4	14	30	

Pool B	W	L	PF	PA	SO#
(United States) Jamie Sinclair	4	0	22	13	8
(Sweden) Anna Hasselborg	3	1	22	15	3
(Ontario) Rachel Homan	2	2	17	17	6
(Switzerland) Binia Feltscher	1	3	17	25	5
(Nova Scotia) Kristen MacDiarmid	0	4	14	22	9

Pool C	W	L	PF	PA	SO#
(Scotland) Eve Muirhead	3	1	30	14	11
(Alberta) Chelsea Carey	3	1	24	23	13
(Switzerland) Alina Pätz	2	2	23	21	10
(Alberta) Delia DeJong	2	2	22	25	15
(Japan) Team Fujisawa	0	4	12	29	12

=== Tiebreakers ===
April 27, 8:00pm

Sheet A	1	2	3	4	5	6	7	8	Final
(Ontario) Rachel Homan 🔨	0	2	0	1	0	2	0	3	8
(Switzerland) Alina Pätz	2	0	2	0	1	0	2	0	7

Sheet E	1	2	3	4	5	6	7	8	Final
(Alberta) Delia DeJong	0	1	0	1	0	1	0	0	3
(Alberta) Val Sweeting 🔨	0	0	2	0	1	0	0	1	4

April 28, 8:30am

Sheet C	1	2	3	4	5	6	7	8	Final
(Manitoba) Jennifer Jones 🔨	1	1	0	1	0	3	4	X	10
(Alberta) Val Sweeting	0	0	2	0	2	0	0	X	4

=== Playoffs ===
Quarterfinals
1	(United States) Jamie Sinclair	3
8	(Ontario) Rachel Homan	6
4	(Sweden) Anna Hasselborg	3
5	(Scotland) Eve Muirhead	4
2	(Switzerland) Silvana Tirinzoni	5
7	(Manitoba) Jennifer Jones	6
3	(Manitoba) Kerri Einarson	5
6	(Alberta) Chelsea Carey	3

Semifinals
8	(Ontario) Rachel Homan	9
5	(Scotland) Eve Muirhead	6
7	(Manitoba) Jennifer Jones	4
3	(Manitoba) Kerri Einarson	6

Final
8	(Ontario) Rachel Homan	7
3	(Manitoba) Kerri Einarson	6

==== Quarterfinals ====
April 28, 12:00pm

Sheet B	1	2	3	4	5	6	7	8	Final
(Manitoba) Kerri Einarson 🔨	1	0	2	0	0	1	0	1	5
(Alberta) Chelsea Carey	0	1	0	2	0	0	0	0	3

Sheet C	1	2	3	4	5	6	7	8	Final
(Sweden) Anna Hasselborg	0	2	0	0	0	0	1	0	3
(Scotland) Eve Muirhead 🔨	1	0	1	0	1	0	0	1	4

Sheet D	1	2	3	4	5	6	7	8	Final
(Switzerland) Silvana Tirinzoni 🔨	1	0	1	0	2	1	0	0	5
(Manitoba) Jennifer Jones	0	1	0	3	0	0	0	2	6

Sheet E	1	2	3	4	5	6	7	8	Final
(United States) Jamie Sinclair 🔨	0	1	1	0	0	1	0	0	3
(Ontario) Rachel Homan	0	0	0	0	1	0	3	2	6

==== Semifinals ====
April 28, 8:00pm

Sheet D	1	2	3	4	5	6	7	8	Final
(Ontario) Rachel Homan	0	0	3	1	2	0	2	1	9
(Scotland) Eve Muirhead 🔨	3	2	0	0	0	1	0	0	6

Sheet E	1	2	3	4	5	6	7	8	Final
(Manitoba) Jennifer Jones	0	0	1	0	1	0	2	0	4
(Manitoba) Kerri Einarson 🔨	1	1	0	2	0	1	0	1	6

==== Final ====
April 29, 10:00am

Sheet C	1	2	3	4	5	6	7	8	Final
(Ontario) Rachel Homan	0	3	0	1	0	1	2	0	7
(Manitoba) Kerri Einarson 🔨	1	0	2	0	2	0	0	1	6

== Qualification ==
=== Men ===
Qualification method	Qualifying team	Scenario if team has already qualified	Notes
Defending Champion 2017 Humpty's Champions Cup	(Ontario) Brad Jacobs	None (first qualifier)	
Winner of GSOC Tour Challenge	(Newfoundland and Labrador) Brad Gushue	None (first qualifier)	
Winner of The Masters Grand Slam of Curling	(Newfoundland and Labrador) Brad Gushue	WCT Event Winner (not already qualified)	
Winner of The National	(Scotland) Bruce Mouat	None (first qualifier)	
Winner of 2017 European Championship	(Sweden) Niklas Edin	None (first qualifier)	
Winner of 2017 Asia/Pacific Championship	(South Korea) ~~Kim Chang-min~~	None (first qualifier)	
Winner of Canadian Open of Curling	(Switzerland) ~~Peter de Cruz~~	None (first qualifier)	
Winner of 2018 Winter Olympics	(United States) ~~John Shuster~~	None (first qualifier)	
Winner of 2018 U.S. National Championship	(United States) Greg Persinger	None (first qualifier)	
Winner of 2018 World Junior Championship	(British Columbia) Tyler Tardi	None (first qualifier)	
Winner of 2018 Tim Hortons Brier	(Newfoundland and Labrador) Brad Gushue	WCT Event Winner (not already qualified)	
Winner of 2018 Elite 10	(Manitoba) Mike McEwen	None (first qualifier)	
Winner of 2018 World Championship	(Sweden) Niklas Edin	WCT Event Winner (not already qualified)	
Winner of 2018 Players' Championship	(Alberta) Kevin Koe	None (first qualifier)	
WCT #1 - Winner of 2017-18 Ranked Event	(Ontario) Brad Jacobs	Already qualified	AMJ Campbell Shorty Jenkins Classic (SFM: 10.5938)
WCT #2 - Winner of 2017-18 Ranked Event	(Manitoba) Reid Carruthers	None (first qualifier)	Canad Inns Men's Classic (SFM: 8.6231)
WCT #3 - Winner of 2017-18 Ranked Event	(Newfoundland and Labrador) Brad Gushue	Already qualified	Swiss Cup Basel (SFM: 8.2928)
WCT #4 - Winner of 2016-18 Ranked Event	(China) ~~Liu Rui~~	None (first qualifier)	Direct Horizontal Drilling Fall Classic (SFM: 8.2344)
WCT #5 - Winner of 2017-18 Ranked Event	(Alberta) Kevin Koe	Already qualified	Ashley Home Store Fall Classic (SFM: 7.8483)
WCT #6 - Winner of 2017-18 Ranked Event	(Saskatchewan) Colton Flasch	None (first qualifier)	College Clean Restoration Curling Classic (SFM: 7.6823)
WCT #7 - Winner of 2017-18 Ranked Event	(Newfoundland and Labrador) Brad Gushue	Already qualified	Stu Sells Toronto Tankard (SFM: 7.3069)
WCT #8 - Winner of 2017-18 Ranked Event	(Sweden) Niklas Edin	Already qualified	Mercure Perth Masters (SFM: 6.8809)
WCT #9 - Winner of 2017-18 Ranked Event	~~(China) Liu Rui~~	Already qualified, declined invite	Challenge de Curling de Gatineau (SFM: 6.8314)
WCT #10 - Winner of 2017-18 Ranked Event	(Scotland) Bruce Mouat	Already qualified	Stu Sells Oakville Tankard (SFM: 6.6939)
WCT #11 - Winner of 2017-18 Ranked Event	(Manitoba) Jason Gunnlaugson	None (first qualifier)	GSOC Tour Challenge Tier 2 (SFM: 6.6456)
WCT #12 - Winner of 2017-17 Ranked Event	(Sweden) Niklas Edin	Already qualified	Curling Masters Champery (SFM: 6.2031)
WCT #13 - Winner of 2017-17 Ranked Event	(Sweden) Niklas Edin	Already qualified	Baden Masters (SFM: 5.8101)
WCT #14 - Winner of 2017-18 Ranked Event	(Alberta) Brendan Bottcher	None (first qualifier)	Red Deer Curling Classic (SFM: 5.0877)
WCT #15 - Winner of 2017-18 Ranked Event	(Scotland) Bruce Mouat	Already qualified	Oakville OCT Fall Classic (SFM: 5.0662)
WCT #16 - Winner of 2016-17 Ranked Event	(Manitoba) Mike McEwen	Already qualified	Ed Werenich Golden Wrench Classic (SFM: 4.9849)
WCT #17 - Winner of 2017-18 Ranked Event	(Alberta) Brendan Bottcher	Already qualified	Medicine Hat Charity Classic (SFM: 4.6272)
WCT #18 - Winner of 2017-18 Ranked Event	(Alberta) Kurt Balderston	None (first qualifier)	Original 16 WCT Bonspiel (SFM: 4.5434)
WCT #19 - Winner of 2017-18 Ranked Event	(Switzerland) Marc Pfister	None (first qualifier)	German Masters (SFM: 4.5412)
WCT #20 - Winner of 2017-18 Ranked Event	(Ontario) Glenn Howard	None (first qualifier)	Huron ReproGraphics Oil Heritage Classic (SFM: 4.4091)

=== Women ===
Qualification method	Qualifying team	Scenario if team has already qualified	Notes
Defending Champion 2017 Humpty's Champions Cup	(Manitoba) Rachel Homan		
Winner of 2017 GSOC Tour Challenge	(Alberta) Val Sweeting	None (first qualifier)	..
Winner of 2017 Masters	(Manitoba) Jennifer Jones	None (first qualifier)	
Winner of 2017 Pacific-Asia Championship	~~(South Korea) Kim Eun-jung~~		
Winner of 2017 Boost National	(Manitoba) Jennifer Jones	Already Qualified	
Winner of 2017 European Championship	(Scotland) Eve Muirhead	None (first qualifier)	
Winner of 2018 Canadian Open	(Alberta) Chelsea Carey	None (first qualifier)	
Winner of 2018 U.S. National Championship	(United States) Jamie Sinclair	None (first qualifier)	
Winner of 2018 Scotties Tournament of Hearts	(Manitoba) Jennifer Jones	Already qualified	
Winner of the 2018 Winter Olympics	(Sweden) Anna Hasselborg		
Winner of 2018 World Junior Championship	(Nova Scotia) Kaitlyn Jones	None (first qualifier)	
Winner of 2018 World Championship	(Manitoba) Jennifer Jones	Already Qualified	
Winner of 2018 Players' Championship	(United States) Jamie Sinclair	Already qualified	
WCT #1 - Winner of 2017-18 Ranked Event	(United States) ~~Nina Roth~~	None (first qualifier)	Canad Inns Women's Classic (SFM: 10.6180)
WCT #2 - Winner of 2017-18 Ranked Event	(Ontario) Rachel Homan	Already qualified	Curlers Corner Autumn Gold Curling Classic (SFM: 9.8021)
WCT #3 - Winner of 2017-18 Ranked Event	(Scotland) Eve Muirhead	Already qualified	HDF Insurance Shoot-Out (SFM: 7.9346)
WCT #4 - Winner of 2017-18 Ranked Event	(Switzerland) Alina Pätz	None (first qualifier)	Stockholm Ladies Curling Cup (SFM: 7.8806)
WCT #5 - Winner of 2017-18 Ranked Event	(Switzerland) Silvana Tirinzoni	None (first qualifier)	Stu Sells Oakville Tankard (SFM: 7.4915)
WCT #6 - Winner of 2017-18 Ranked Event	(Ontario) Rachel Homan	Already qualified	Prestige Hotels & Resorts Curling Classic (SFM: 7.3069)
WCT #7 - Winner of 2017-18 Ranked Event	(Japan) Satsuki Fujisawa	None (first qualifier)	Karuizawa International (SFM: 6.6069)
WCT #8 - Winner of 2017-18 Ranked Event	(Manitoba) Kerri Einarson	None (first qualifier)	GSOC Tour Challenge Tier 2 (SFM: 6.5875)
WCT #9 - Winner of 2017-18 Ranked Event	(China) ~~Wang Bingyu~~	None (first qualifier)	Women's Masters Basel (SFM: 6.5544)
WCT #10 - Winner of 2017-18 Ranked Event	(United States) Jamie Sinclair	Already qualified	AMJ Campbell Shorty Jenkins Classic (SFM: 5.9702)
WCT #11 - Winner of 2017-18 Ranked Event	(Russia) ~~Anna Sidorova~~	None (first qualifier)	CCT Arctic Cup (SFM: 5.878)
WCT #11 - Winner of 2017-18 Ranked Event	(Alberta) Delia DeJong	None (first qualifier)	Red Deer Curling Classic (SFM: 5.2766)
WCT #12 - Winner of 2017-18 Ranked Event	(Switzerland) Binia Feltscher	None (first qualifier)	Glynhill Ladies International (SFM: 5.1354)
WCT #13 - Winner of 2017-18 Ranked Event	(Ontario) ~~Julie Tippin~~	None (first qualifier)	Stu Sells Toronto Tankard (SFM: 5.0898)
WCT #14 - Winner of 2017-18 Ranked Event	(Alberta) ~~Kelsey Rocque~~	None (first qualifier)	Curl Mesabi Classic (SFM: 4.5996)
WCT #15 - Winner of 2017-18 Ranked Event	(Nova Scotia) Kristen MacDiarmid	None (first qualifier)	Royal LePage OVCA Women's Fall Classic (SFM: 4.3588)
