= 2017–18 curling season =

- Sport: Curling

Seasons
- ← 2016–17 2018–19 →

The 2017–18 curling season began in May 2017 and ended in May 2018.

Note: In events with two genders, the men's tournament winners will be listed before the women's tournament winners.

== Curling Canada sanctioned events ==
This section lists events sanctioned by and/or conducted by Curling Canada. The following events in bold have been confirmed by Curling Canada as are part of the 2017–18 Season of Champions programme.

Event	Winning team	Runner-up team
**Home Hardware Road to the Roar (Pre-Olympic Trials)**; Summerside, Prince Edward Island, Nov. 6–12	(British Columbia) John Morris	(Alberta) Brendan Bottcher
**Home Hardware Road to the Roar (Pre-Olympic Trials)**; Summerside, Prince Edward Island, Nov. 6–12	(Ontario) Krista McCarville	(Ontario) Julie Tippin
Canadian Mixed Curling Championship; Swan River, Manitoba, Nov. 12–18	Ontario	Quebec
Travelers Curling Club Championship; Kingston, Ontario, Nov. 20–25	British Columbia	Manitoba
Travelers Curling Club Championship; Kingston, Ontario, Nov. 20–25	Manitoba	Alberta
**Tim Hortons Roar of the Rings (Canadian Olympic Curling Trials)**; Ottawa, Ontario, Dec. 2–10	(Alberta) Kevin Koe	(Manitoba) Mike McEwen
**Tim Hortons Roar of the Rings (Canadian Olympic Curling Trials)**; Ottawa, Ontario, Dec. 2–10	(Ontario) Rachel Homan	(Alberta) Chelsea Carey
Canad Inns Canadian Mixed Doubles Olympic Trials; Portage la Prairie, Manitoba Jan. 2-7	(Manitoba) (Alberta) Lawes / Morris	(Alberta) (Newfoundland and Labrador) Sweeting / Gushue
**Continental Cup of Curling**; London, Ontario, Jan. 11–14	(Canada) (United States) Team North America	(United Nations) Team World
**Canadian Junior Curling Championships**; Shawinigan, Quebec, Jan. 13–21	British Columbia	Northern Ontario
**Canadian Junior Curling Championships**; Shawinigan, Quebec, Jan. 13–21	Nova Scotia	Quebec
**Tournament of Hearts**; Penticton, British Columbia, Jan. 27–Feb. 4	Manitoba	(Manitoba) Wildcard
**Tim Hortons Brier**; Regina, Saskatchewan, Mar. 3–11	Canada	Alberta
**World Women's Curling Championship**; North Bay, Ontario, Mar. 17–25	Canada	Sweden
Canadian Senior Curling Championship; Stratford, Ontario Mar. 24–29	Ontario	New Brunswick
Canadian Senior Curling Championship; Stratford, Ontario Mar. 24–29	Saskatchewan	Nova Scotia
CCAA Curling National Championships; Leduc, Alberta, Mar. 24–28	(British Columbia) Douglas Royals	(Ontario) Fanshawe Falcons
CCAA Curling National Championships; Leduc, Alberta, Mar. 24–28	(Ontario) Fanshawe Falcons	(British Columbia) Camosun Chargers
U Sports/Curling Canada University Championships; Leduc, Alberta, Mar. 24–28	Alberta Golden Bears	(Manitoba) Winnipeg Wesmen
U Sports/Curling Canada University Championships; Leduc, Alberta, Mar. 24–28	Alberta Pandas	(British Columbia) Thompson Rivers Wolfpack
Canadian Wheelchair Curling Championship; Leduc, Alberta, Mar. 26-Apr. 1	Saskatchewan	Manitoba
Canadian Mixed Doubles Curling Championship; Leduc, Alberta Mar. 29-Apr. 1	(Alberta) (Saskatchewan) Crocker / Muyers	(Manitoba) Sahaidak / Lott
Canadian Masters Curling Championships; Surrey & White Rock, British Columbia, Apr. 1-8	Alberta	British Columbia
Canadian Masters Curling Championships; Surrey & White Rock, British Columbia, Apr. 1-8	British Columbia	Saskatchewan
Canadian Under-18 Curling Championship; St. Andrews, New Brunswick Apr. 9-14	Nova Scotia	Alberta
Canadian Under-18 Curling Championship; St. Andrews, New Brunswick Apr. 9-14	Nova Scotia	Saskatchewan

== Other events ==
Note: Events that have not been placed on Curling Canada's list of sanctioned events are listed here. If an event is listed on Curling Canada's final list for the 2017–18 curling season, it will be moved up to the "Curling Canada-sanctioned events" section.

Event	Winning team		Runner-up team
Everest Curling Challenge; Fredericton, New Brunswick, August 25–27	Team Gushue		Team Epping
Japanese Olympic Curling Trials; Tokoro, Japan, Sept. 8-10	(Hokkaido) Satsuki Fujisawa		(Nagano Prefecture) Chiaki Matsumura
World Mixed Curling Championship; Champéry, Switzerland, Oct. 6–14	Scotland		Canada
Switzerland Olympic Curling Trials; Biel-Bienne, Switzerland, Oct. 11–14	(Aargau) Silvana Tirinzoni		(Aargau) Alina Pätz (Grisons) Binia Feltscher
Pacific-Asia Curling Championships; Erina, Australia, Nov. 2–9	South Korea		China
Pacific-Asia Curling Championships; Erina, Australia, Nov. 2–9	South Korea		Japan
United States Olympic Curling Trials; Omaha, Nebraska, Nov. 11–18	(Minnesota) John Shuster		(Minnesota) Heath McCormick
United States Olympic Curling Trials; Omaha, Nebraska, Nov. 11–18	(Minnesota) Nina Roth		(Minnesota) Jamie Sinclair
European Curling Championships; St. Gallen, Switzerland, Nov. 17–25	A	Sweden	Scotland
European Curling Championships; St. Gallen, Switzerland, Nov. 17–25	A	Scotland	Sweden
European Curling Championships; St. Gallen, Switzerland, Nov. 17–25	B	Finland	Poland
European Curling Championships; St. Gallen, Switzerland, Nov. 17–25	B	Finland	Latvia
Olympic Qualification Event; Plzeň, Czech Republic, Dec. 5–10	Italy		Denmark
Olympic Qualification Event; Plzeň, Czech Republic, Dec. 5–10	China		Denmark
United States Mixed Doubles Curling Olympic Trials; Blaine, Minnesota, Dec. 13-17	(Wisconsin) R. Hamilton / M. Hamilton		(Minnesota) (Wisconsin) Christensen / Shuster
Russian Olympic Curling Trials; Sochi, Russia, Dec. 27-30	(Saint Petersburg) Victoria Moiseeva		(Moscow) Anna Sidorova
World Junior B Curling Championships; Lohja, Finland Jan. 3–10	China		Russia
World Junior B Curling Championships; Lohja, Finland Jan. 3–10	China		Turkey
Americas Challenge (men's); London, Ontario, Jan. 11–13	Canada		Brazil
2018 Winter Olympics; Pyeongchang, South Korea, Feb. 9–25	M	United States	Sweden
2018 Winter Olympics; Pyeongchang, South Korea, Feb. 9–25	W	Sweden	South Korea
2018 Winter Olympics; Pyeongchang, South Korea, Feb. 9–25	MD	Canada	Switzerland
World Junior Curling Championships; Aberdeen, Scotland, Mar. 3–11	Canada		Scotland
World Junior Curling Championships; Aberdeen, Scotland, Mar. 3–11	Canada		Sweden
Winter Paralympics; Pyeongchang, South Korea, Mar. 9–18	China		Norway
World Men's Curling Championship; Las Vegas, United States, Mar. 31–Apr. 8	Sweden		Canada
2018 European Group C Tarnby, Denmark, Apr.11–Apr. 16	Denmark		Belarus
2018 European Group C Tarnby, Denmark, Apr.11–Apr. 16	Slovakia		Poland
World Senior Curling Championships; Östersund, Sweden, Apr. 21–28	Canada		Sweden
World Senior Curling Championships; Östersund, Sweden, Apr. 21–28	Canada		United States
World Mixed Doubles Curling Championship; Östersund, Sweden, Apr. 21–28	Switzerland		Russia

== World Curling Tour ==
=== Teams ===
See: List of teams on the 2017–18 World Curling Tour

Grand Slam events in bold.

=== Men's events ===
Week	Event	Winning skip	Runner-up skip	Purse (CAD (Note: Prize winnings converted from local currency for events held outside Canada))	Winner's share (CAD)	SFM
2	Hokkaido Bank Curling Classic; Sapporo, Japan, Aug. 3–6	(South Korea) Kim Soo-hyuk	(Japan) Yusuke Morozumi	$19,425	$11,427	2.1563
3	Icebreaker at The Granite; Winnipeg, Manitoba, Aug. 25–27	(Manitoba) Braden Calvert	(United States) John Shuster	$7,680	$2,200	3.4758
4	Baden Masters; Baden, Switzerland, Sept. 1–3	(Sweden) Niklas Edin	(Norway) Thomas Ulsrud	$39,965	$14,181	5.8101
4	Stu Sells Oakville Tankard; Oakville, Ontario, Sep. 1–4	(Scotland) Bruce Mouat	(South Korea) Kim Chang-min	$28,000	$8,000	6.6939
4	Tallinn Challenger; Tallinn, Estonia, Sep. 1–3	(Scotland) Cameron Bryce	(Latvia) Ritvars Gulbis			
5	**GSOC Tour Challenge Tier 1** Regina, Saskatchewan, Sept. 5–10	(Newfoundland and Labrador) Brad Gushue	(Norway) Steffen Walstad	$100,000	$20,000	10.6756
5	GSOC Tour Challenge Tier 2 Regina, Saskatchewan, Sept. 5–10	(Manitoba) Jason Gunnlaugson	(Manitoba) William Lyburn	$50,000	$10,000	6.6456
5	Oakville OCT Fall Classic; Oakville, Ontario, Sep. 8–10	(Scotland) Bruce Mouat	(South Korea) Kim Chang-min	$15,000	$3,400	5.0662
6	AMJ Campbell Shorty Jenkins Classic; Cornwall, Ontario, Sep. 14–17	(Ontario) Brad Jacobs	(Manitoba) Mike McEwen	$60,200	$15,300	10.5938
6	King Cash Spiel; Maple Ridge, British Columbia, Sept. 15–18	(British Columbia) Sean Geall	(British Columbia) Dean Joanisse	$12,000	$4,500	2.5571
7	Mother Club Fall Curling Classic; Winnipeg, Manitoba, Sep. 21–24	(Manitoba) Jason Gunnlaugson	(Manitoba) Pat Simmons	$10,000	$2,500	4.0770
7	KW Fall Classic; Waterloo, Ontario, Sep. 21–24	(Ontario) Matthew Hall	(Ontario) Rob Retchless	$9,900	$2,500	3.2146
7	Lakeshore Curling Club Cashspiel; Lower Sackville, Nova Scotia, Sep. 21–24	(Nova Scotia) Kendal Thompson	(Nova Scotia) Stuart Thompson	$5,250		
8	College Clean Restoration Curling Classic; Saskatoon, Saskatchewan, Sep. 29–Oct. 2	(Saskatchewan) Colton Flasch	(South Korea) Kim Chang-min	$33,000	$9,000	7.6823
8	Prestige Hotels & Resorts Curling Classic; Vernon, British Columbia, Sept. 29–Oct. 2	(British Columbia) Jeff Guignard	(British Columbia) Adam Cseke	$12,000	$5,000	
8	KKP Classic; Winnipeg, Manitoba, Sept. 28–Oct. 1	(Manitoba) Dennis Bohn	(Manitoba) Travis Bale	$12,000	$1,300	2.7532
8	Avonair Cash Spiel; Edmonton, Alberta, Sept. 29–Oct. 1	(Alberta) Aaron Sluchinski	(China) Zou Dejia	$12,500	$3,300	3.0106
8	Swiss Cup Basel; Basel, Switzerland, Sept. 28–Oct. 1	(Newfoundland and Labrador) Brad Gushue	(Norway) Thomas Ulsrud	$33,515	$18,048	8.2928
9	Direct Horizontal Drilling Fall Classic; Edmonton, Alberta, Oct. 6–9	(China) Liu Rui	(Alberta) Kevin Koe	$50,000	$12,000	8.2344
9	Stu Sells Toronto Tankard; Toronto, Ontario, Oct. 5–9	(Newfoundland and Labrador) Brad Gushue	(Ontario) Codey Maus	$42,000	$12,000	7.3069
9	St. Paul Cash Spiel; St. Paul, Minnesota, Oct. 6–8	(United States) Heath McCormick	(United States) Sean Murray	$17,141	$5,005	3.3248
9	Man Curl Tour Classic; Winnipeg, Manitoba, Oct. 6–9	(Manitoba) David Bohn	(Manitoba) Jordan Smith	$8,000	$2,000	2.6840
9	Bud Light Men's Cashspiel; Halifax, Nova Scotia, Oct. 6–9	(Nova Scotia) Robert Mayhew	(Nova Scotia) Owen Purcell	$6,400	$1,750	2.1538
9	Minebea Mitsumi Cup; Miyota, Japan, Oct. 6–8	(Japan) Satoru Tsukamoto	(Japan) Kazuhisa Unoura	$4,009	$1,670	1.1054
10	Canad Inns Men's Classic; Portage la Prairie, Manitoba, Oct. 13–16	(Manitoba) Reid Carruthers	(Ontario) Glenn Howard	$60,000	$18,000	8.6231
10	Stroud Sleeman Cash Spiel; Stroud, Ontario, Oct. 12–15	(Ontario) Wayne Tuck Jr.	(Ontario) Brandon Tippin	$12,380	$4,000	3.2367
10	McKee Homes Fall Curling Classic; Airdrie, Alberta, Oct. 13–15	(Alberta) Kevin Park	(Alberta) Aaron Sluchinski	$12,800	$3,200	2.2071
10	Atkins Curling Supplies Classic; Winnipeg, Manitoba, Oct. 13–16	(Manitoba) David Bohn	(Manitoba) Jordan Smith	$8,800	$2,000	2.7097
10	Kalamazoo Men's Classic; Kalamazoo, Michigan, Oct. 13–15	(United States) Brandon Corbett	(United States) Garnet Eckstrand	(USD) $3,600		0.9298
11	Challenge de Curling de Gatineau; Masson, Quebec, Oct. 19–22	(China) Liu Rui	(Switzerland) Peter de Cruz	$41,000	$11,000	6.8314
11	Curling Masters Champéry; Champéry, Switzerland, Oct. 19–22	(Sweden) Niklas Edin	(Scotland) Greg Drummond	$57,692	$17,949	6.2031
11	Medicine Hat Charity Classic; Medicine Hat, Alberta, Oct. 20–23	(Alberta) Brendan Bottcher	(Alberta) Jamie King	$35,000	$10,000	4.6272
12	**Masters of Curling**; Lloydminster, Saskatchewan, Oct. 24–29	(Newfoundland and Labrador) Brad Gushue	(Sweden) Niklas Edin	$125,000	$30,000	12.0203
12	Dave Jones Alexander Keith's Mayflower Cashspiel; Halifax, Nova Scotia, Oct. 26–29	(Nova Scotia) Mark Dacey	(Nova Scotia) Chad Stevens	$22,000	$5,000	3.1812
12	Huron ReproGraphics Oil Heritage Classic; Point Edward, Ontario, Oct. 26–29	(Ontario) Glenn Howard	(United States) Brady Clark	$15,900	$4,800	4.4091
12	Grande Prairie Cash Spiel; Grande Prairie, Alberta, Oct. 27–29	(Alberta) Jeff Ginter	(Alberta) Scott Webb	$9,700	$2,400	2.0259
12	Latvia International Challenger; Riga, Latvia, Oct. 26–29	(Denmark) Rasmus Stjerne	(Switzerland) Yves Hess	$4,459	$2,081	1.6463
13	Ashley Home Store Curling Classic; Penticton, British Columbia, Nov. 3–6	(Alberta) Kevin Koe	(Sweden) Niklas Edin	$66,000	$18,000	7.8483
13	CookstownCash presented by Comco Canada Inc; Cookstown, Ontario, Nov. 2–5	(Ontario) Mark Kean	(Ontario) Tanner Horgan	$11,200	$4,000	3.3412
13	Fort Garry Industries Bonspiel; Winnipeg, Manitoba, Nov. 3–6	(Manitoba) Dennis Bohn	(Manitoba) Tanner Lott	$10,000	$2,700	2.8922
14	Original 16 WCT Bonspiel; Calgary, Alberta, Nov. 10–12	(Alberta) Kurt Balderston	(Scotland) Tom Brewster	$24,000	$6,000	4.5434
14	Fort St. John Cash Spiel; Fort St. John, British Columbia, Nov. 10–12	(Alberta) Jeff Ginter	(Alberta) Graham Powell	$8,000		
15	**Boost National**; Sault Ste. Marie, Ontario, Nov. 14–19	(Scotland) Bruce Mouat	(South Korea) Kim Chang-min	$125,000	$30,000	10.7202
15	DeKalb Superspiel; Morris, Manitoba, Nov. 17–20	(Ontario) Dylan Johnston	(Switzerland) Yannick Schwaller	$34,500	$10,300	3.6955
15	Red Deer Curling Classic; Red Deer, Alberta, Nov. 17–20	(Alberta) Brendan Bottcher	(Alberta) Ted Appelman	$39,000	$10,000	5.0877
15	Fort Wayne Mad Anthony CashSpiel; Fort Wayne, Indiana, Nov. 17–19	(United States) Garnet Eckstrand	(United States) Andrew Stopera	(USD) $4,560	(USD) $900	
16	Challenge Casino de Charlevoix; Clermont, Quebec, Nov. 23–26	(Quebec) Martin Ferland	(Nova Scotia) Stuart Thompson	$27,000	$8,000	3.9780
16	Driving Force Abbotsford Cashspiel; Abbotsford, British Columbia, Nov. 24–26	(British Columbia) Jason Montgomery	(British Columbia) Sean Geall	$18,000	$6,000	2.8209
16	Black Diamond / High River Cash; Black Diamond & High River, Alberta, Nov. 24–26	(Alberta) Aaron Sluchinski	(Alberta) Chad Dahlseide	$7,900	$2,000	1.6247
16	The Sunova Spiel at East St. Paul; Winnipeg, Manitoba, Nov. 24–27	(Manitoba) David Bohn	(Manitoba) Travis Bale	$10,000	$2,600	3.1403
16	Spitfire Arms Cash Spiel; Windsor, Nova Scotia, Nov. 24–26	(Nova Scotia) Kendal Thompson	(Nova Scotia) Mike Callaghan	$3,000	$1,200	
17	Thistle Integrity Stakes; Winnipeg, Manitoba, Dec. 1–4	(Manitoba) Andrew Hunt	(Manitoba) William Lyburn	$5,000	$1,300	2.6139
17	WFG Jim Sullivan Curling Classic; Saint John, New Brunswick, Dec. 1–3	(Nova Scotia) Jamie Murphy	(New Brunswick) Wayne Tallon	$15,300	$5,000	2.7017
17	Brantford Nissan Men's Classic; Brantford, Ontario, Dec. 1–3	(Ontario) Richard Krell	(Ontario) Mark Kean	$16,000	$5,000	3.5349
18	Curl Mesabi Classic; Eveleth, Minnesota, Dec. 8–10	(United States) Greg Persinger	(United States) Joe Polo	$23,138	$7,709	4.0667
18	Dawson Creek Cash Spiel; Dawson Creek, British Columbia, Dec. 8–10	(Alberta) Kurt Balderston	(British Columbia) Tracy Steinke	$10,500		
18	MCT Championships; Dauphin, Manitoba, Dec. 8–10	(Manitoba) Jason Gunnlaugson	(Manitoba) Pat Simmons	$7,500	$2,000	4.1385
19	Karuizawa International; Karuizawa, Japan, Dec. 13–17	(Japan) Yusuke Morozumi	(South Korea) Kim Chang-min	$31,980	$11,422	4.0688
19	Dumfries Challenger Series; Dumfries, Scotland, Dec. 14–17	(Scotland) Bruce Mouat	(Switzerland) Jan Hess	$17,620	$6,904	2.2482
19	King Spud Classic; Carberry, Manitoba, Dec. 15–17	(Manitoba) Kelly Marnoch	(Manitoba) Sean Grassie	$8,400	$2,500	2.1842
19	Dakota Challenger Spiel; Lakeville, Minnesota, Dec. 16–17	(United States) Dominik Maerki	(United States) Dale Gibbs	(USD) 3,600		
21	US Open of Curling; Blaine, Minnesota, Dec. 29–Jan. 1	(United States) Heath McCormick	(Saskatchewan) Adam Casey	$21,434	$6,935	4.1801
22	Mercure Perth Masters; Perth, Scotland, Jan. 4–7	(Sweden) Niklas Edin	(Switzerland) Peter de Cruz	$30,839	$10,954	6.8809
23	Ed Werenich Golden Wrench Classic; Tempe, Arizona, Jan. 11–14	(Manitoba) Mike McEwen	(Saskatchewan) Steve Laycock	$17,406	$7,460	4.9849
23	Peace Tour Championship; Sexsmith, Alberta, Jan. 12–14	(British Columbia) Jeff Ginter	(Alberta) Scott Webb	$8,450	$2,250	1.2314
23	Brandon Men's Bonspiel; Brandon, Manitoba, Jan. 11-14	(Manitoba) Brett Walter	(Manitoba) Graham Freeman	$7,000		
24	**Meridian Canadian Open**; Camrose, Alberta, Jan. 16–21	(Switzerland) Peter de Cruz	(Sweden) Niklas Edin	$100,000	$30,000	11.8181
24	German Masters; Hamburg, Germany, Jan. 19–21	(Switzerland) Marc Pfister	(Scotland) Kyle Smith	$22,963	$6,889	4.5412
25	WCT Moscow Classic; Moscow, Russia, Jan. 25–29	(Netherlands) Jaap van Dorp	(Czech Republic) Lukáš Klíma			
32	**Princess Auto Elite 10**; Winnipeg, Manitoba, Mar. 15–18	(Manitoba) Mike McEwen	(Newfoundland and Labrador) Brad Gushue	$100,000	$28,000	
32	Aberdeen International Curling Championship; Aberdeen, Scotland, Mar. 16–18	(Scotland) Bruce Mouat	(Switzerland) Yannick Schwaller	$24,168	$10,040	5.2203
36	**Players' Championship**; Toronto, Ontario, Apr. 10–15	(Alberta) Kevin Koe	(Sweden) Niklas Edin	$100,000	$30,000	11.0688
38	**Humpty's Champions Cup**; Calgary, Alberta, Apr. 24–29	(Newfoundland and Labrador) Brad Gushue	(Ontario) Glenn Howard	$100,000		

=== Women's events ===
Week	Event	Winning skip	Runner-up skip	Purse (CAD)	Winner's share (CAD)	SFM
1	CCT Arctic Cup; Dudinka, Russia, May 18–22	(Russia) Anna Sidorova	(Manitoba) Jennifer Jones	$134,993	$51,297	5.878
2	Hokkaido Bank Curling Classic; Sapporo, Japan, Aug. 3–6	(Japan) Satsuki Fujisawa	(South Korea) Kim Min-ji	$19,425	$11,427	2.1563
3	Icebreaker at The Granite; Winnipeg, Manitoba, Aug. 25–27	(Manitoba) Kerri Einarson	(Manitoba) Darcy Robertson	$6,020	$2,100	3.8089
4	Stu Sells Oakville Tankard; Oakville, Ontario, Sep. 1–4	(Switzerland) Silvana Tirinzoni	(Ontario) Sherry Middaugh	$23,000	$7,000	7.4915
5	**GSOC Tour Challenge Tier 1** Regina, Saskatchewan, Sept. 5–10	(Alberta) Val Sweeting	(Sweden) Anna Hasselborg	$100,000	$20,000	10.9275
5	GSOC Tour Challenge Tier 2 Regina, Saskatchewan, Sept. 5–10	(Manitoba) Kerri Einarson	(Alberta) Chelsea Carey	$50,000	$10,000	6.5875
5	Biosteel Oakville Fall Classic; Oakville, Ontario, Sep. 8–10	(Russia) Uliana Vasilyeva	(Ontario) Susan Froud	$9,000	$2,250	4.0197
6	HDF Insurance Shoot-Out; Edmonton, Alberta, Sept. 14–17	(Scotland) Eve Muirhead	(Sweden) Anna Hasselborg	$32,000	$8,000	7.9346
6	AMJ Campbell Shorty Jenkins Classic; Cornwall, Ontario, Sept. 14–17	(United States) Jamie Sinclair	(Ontario) Krista McCarville	$29,500	$10,000	5.9702
6	King Cash Spiel; Maple Ridge, British Columbia, Sept. 15–18	(British Columbia) Sarah Wark	(British Columbia) Kesa Van Osch	$8,000	$4,000	2.9637
7	Colonial Square Ladies Classic; Saskatoon, Saskatchewan, Sept. 22–25	(Manitoba) Shannon Birchard	(Manitoba) Jennifer Jones	$27,000	$7,500	6.3459
7	KW Fall Classic; Waterloo, Ontario, Sept. 21–24	(Ontario) Julie Tippin	(Ontario) Susan Froud	$9,375	$2,500	4.2106
7	Mother Club Fall Curling Classic; Winnipeg, Manitoba, Sep. 21–24	(Manitoba) Michelle Englot	(Manitoba) Kerri Einarson	$8,000	$2,000	3.9591
7	Lakeshore Curling Club Cashspiel; Lower Sackville, Nova Scotia, Sep. 21–24	(Nova Scotia) Julie McEvoy	(Nova Scotia) Theresa Breen	$5,350		
8	Stockholm Ladies Curling Cup; Stockholm, Sweden, Sept. 29–Oct. 1	(Switzerland) Alina Pätz	(South Korea) Kim Eun-jung	$50,630	$16,979	7.8806
8	Prestige Hotels & Resorts Curling Classic; Vernon, British Columbia, Sept. 28–Oct. 1	(Ontario) Rachel Homan	(South Korea) Gim Un-chi	$41,000	$9,000	7.3069
8	Avonair Cash Spiel; Edmonton, Alberta, Sept. 29–Oct. 1	(Alberta) Nadine Scotland	(Alberta) Jodi Marthaller	$7,700	$2,400	2.9174
9	Curlers Corner Autumn Gold Curling Classic; Calgary, Alberta, Oct. 6–9	(Ontario) Rachel Homan	(United States) Nina Roth	$50,000	$14,000	9.8021
9	Women's Masters Basel; Basel, Switzerland, Oct. 6–8	(China) Wang Bingyu	(Switzerland) Binia Feltscher	$38,436	$12,812	6.5544
9	Stu Sells Toronto Tankard; Toronto, Ontario, Oct. 5–9	(Ontario) Julie Tippin	(Ontario) Chrissy Cadorin	$16,000	$5,000	5.0898
9	St. Paul Cash Spiel; St. Paul, Minnesota, Oct. 6–8	(United States) Jessica Schultz	(United States) Cora Farrell	$5,004	$2,002	
9	Man Curl Tour Classic; Winnipeg, Manitoba, Oct. 6–9	(Manitoba) Joelle Brown	(Manitoba) Shannon Birchard	$5,200	$1,800	
9	New Scotland Clothing Ladies Cashspiel; Halifax, Nova Scotia, Oct. 6–9	(Nova Scotia) Kaitlyn Jones	(Nova Scotia) Jill Brothers	$5,200	$1,500	2.4458
10	Paf Masters Tour; Åland, Finland, Oct. 12–15	(South Korea) Kim Eun-jung	(Alberta) Shannon Kleibrink	$26,515	$12,521	4.1563
10	Atkins Curling Supplies Classic; Winnipeg, Manitoba, Oct. 13–16	(Manitoba) Darcy Robertson	(Manitoba) Barb Spencer	$10,000	$2,500	3.2935
10	Stroud Sleeman Cash Spiel; Stroud, Ontario, Oct. 12–15	(Ontario) Susan Froud	(Ontario) Ashley Waye	$7,425	$2,400	2.8565
11	Canad Inns Women's Classic; Portage la Prairie, Manitoba, Oct. 20–23	(United States) Nina Roth	(Sweden) Anna Hasselborg	$60,000	$15,000	10.6180
11	Kamloops Crown of Curling; Kamloops, British Columbia, Oct. 20–23	(British Columbia) Dailene Pewarchuk	(British Columbia) Patti Knezevic	$12,000	$4,500	3.2581
11	Medicine Hat Charity Classic; Medicine Hat, Alberta, Oct. 20–23	(Saskatchewan) Candace Chisholm	(Saskatchewan) Penny Barker	$11,600	$5,500	3.4262
11	Lady Monctonian Invitational Spiel; Moncton, New Brunswick, Oct. 20–22	(Nova Scotia) Theresa Breen	(Prince Edward Island) Veronica Smith	$7,500	$1,900	3.0225
12	**Masters of Curling**; Lloydminster, Alberta, Oct. 24–29	(Manitoba) Jennifer Jones	(Manitoba) Kerri Einarson	$125,000	$30,000	11.7219
12	Gord Carroll Curling Classic; Whitby, Ontario, Oct. 27–29	(Ontario) Tracy Fleury	(Sweden) Isabella Wranå	$8,500	$2,200	3.7084
12	Dave Jones Stanhope Simpson Insurance Mayflower Cashspiel; Halifax, Nova Scotia, Oct. 26–29	(Nova Scotia) Jill Brothers	(Nova Scotia) Theresa Breen	$10,000	$3,000	3.1081
12	Latvia International Challenger; Riga, Latvia, Oct. 26–29	(Germany) Daniela Jentsch	(Switzerland) Elena Stern	$4,459	$2,081	2.0356
12	Fort Garry Industries Bonspiel; Winnipeg, Manitoba, Oct. 27–29	(Manitoba) Beth Peterson	(Manitoba) Katie Chappellaz	$6,000	$2,000	2.1875
13	Royal LePage OVCA Women's Fall Classic; Kemptville, Ontario, Nov. 2–5	(Nova Scotia) Kristen MacDiarmid	(Sweden) Isabella Wranå	$20,000	$5,500	4.3588
13	Tallinn Ladies International Challenger; Tallinn, Estonia, Nov. 3–5	(Switzerland) Chantale Widmer	(Russia) Maria Baksheeva	$3,704	$1,778	1.9452
14	International ZO Women's Tournament; Wetzikon, Switzerland, Nov. 10–12	(Czech Republic) Anna Kubeskova	(Russia) Anna Sidorova	$17,903	$7,673	4.3420
14	Crestwood Ladies Fall Classic; Edmonton, Alberta, Nov. 9–12	(Russia) Victoria Moiseeva	(Manitoba) Michelle Englot	$11,000	$3,000	3.4065
15	**Boost National**; Sault Ste. Marie, Ontario, Nov. 14–19	(Manitoba) Jennifer Jones	(Alberta) Casey Scheidegger	$100,000	$30,000	10.9546
15	DeKalb Superspiel; Morris, Manitoba, Nov. 17–20	(Saskatchewan) Penny Barker	(Manitoba) Briane Meilleur	$23,000	$7,200	3.7390
15	Red Deer Curling Classic; Red Deer, Alberta, Nov. 17–20	(Alberta) Delia DeJong	(Japan) Satsuki Fujisawa	$30,000	$9,000	5.2766
16	Boundary Ford Curling Classic; Lloydminster, Saskatchewan, Nov. 24–26	(Saskatchewan) Robyn Silvernagle	(Saskatchewan) Chantelle Eberle	$18,000	$5,000	2.7327
16	Driving Force Abbotsford Cashspiel; Abbotsford, British Columbia, Nov. 24–26	(Russia) Victoria Moiseeva	(British Columbia) Dailene Pewarchuk	$17,500	$6,000	3.7157
16	The Sunova Spiel at East St. Paul; Winnipeg, Manitoba, Nov. 24–27	(Manitoba) Barb Spencer	(Manitoba) Rhonda Varnes	$10,000	$2,600	3.4467
16	Spitfire Arms Cash Spiel; Windsor, Nova Scotia, Nov. 24–26	(Nova Scotia) Julie McEvoy	(Nova Scotia) Jill Brothers	$8,000	$2,000	2.8500
17	WFG Jim Sullivan Curling Classic; Saint John, New Brunswick, Dec. 1–3	(New Brunswick) Sylvie Robichaud	(Prince Edward Island) Veronica Smith	$5,000	$1,700	2.0475
18	Curl Mesabi Classic; Eveleth, Minnesota, Dec. 8–10	(Alberta) Kelsey Rocque	(United States) Nina Roth	$16,190	$4,497	4.5996
18	MCT Championships; East St. Paul, Manitoba, Dec. 8–10	(Manitoba) Shannon Birchard	(Manitoba) Kerri Einarson	$6,500	$2,000	3.6639
19	Karuizawa International; Karuizawa, Japan, Dec. 13–17	(Japan) Satsuki Fujisawa	(Japan) Chiaki Matsumura	$31,980	$11,422	6.6069
19	Dakota Challenger Spiel; Lakeville, Minnesota, Dec. 15–16	(United States) Jessica Schultz	(United States) Kimberly Wapola	(USD) 3,600		
21	US Open of Curling; Blaine, Minnesota, Dec. 29–Jan. 1	(United States) Jamie Sinclair	(United States) Nina Roth	$17,905	$6,305	4.1374
23	International Bernese Ladies Cup; Bern, Switzerland, Jan. 11–14	(China) Wang Bingyu	(United States) Jamie Sinclair	(CHF) 20,500	(CHF) 6,000	6.1511
24	**Canadian Open**; Camrose, Alberta, Jan. 16–21	(Alberta) Chelsea Carey	(Manitoba) Michelle Englot	$100,000	$30,000	11.9213
24	Glynhill Ladies International; Glasgow, Scotland, Jan. 19–22	(Switzerland) Binia Feltscher	(Switzerland) Elena Stern	$18,381	$6,936	5.1354
34	City of Perth Ladies International; Perth, Scotland, Mar. 30-Apr 1	(Scotland) Hannah Fleming	(Sweden) Isabella Wranå	(£) 15,800	(£) 4,000	
36	**Players' Championship**; Toronto, Ontario, Apr. 10–15	(United States) Jamie Sinclair	(Manitoba) Jennifer Jones	$100,000	$30,000	10.6356
38	**Champions Cup**; Calgary, Alberta, Apr. 25–30	(Ontario) Rachel Homan	(Manitoba) Kerri Einarson	$100,000		10.7202

=== Mixed doubles events ===
Week	Event	Winning pair	Runner-up pair	Purse (CAD)	Winner's share (CAD)	SFM
4	Canad Inns Mixed Doubles Championship; Winnipeg, Manitoba, Sept. 1–4	(Alberta) Carey / (Manitoba) Hodgson	(Alberta) Peterman / (Newfoundland and Labrador) Gallant	$36,000	$10,000	
5	Oberstdorf International Mixed Doubles Cup; Oberstdorf, Germany, Sept. 7–10	(Czech Republic) Hájková / Paul	(Switzerland) Rupp / Wunderlin	$4,099	$1,171	
7	CCT Tallinn Mixed Doubles International; Tallinn, Estonia, Sept. 21–24	(Estonia) Turmann / Lill	(Switzerland) Barbezat / Perret	$1,839	$809	
7	Service Experts Mixed Doubles Classic; Edmonton, Alberta, Sept. 22–24	(Nova Scotia) Baxter / Dacey	(Alberta) H. Nedohin / D. Nedohin	$12,500	$3,800	
10	Pacific Northwest Mixed Doubles Invitational; Seattle, Washington, Oct. 13–15	(Manitoba) Birchard / Gunnlaugson	(United States) Sinclair / Dropkin	$15,048	$3,762	
11	WCT Austrian Mixed Doubles Cup; Kitzbühel, Austria, Oct. 19–22	(China) Wang / Ba	(Switzerland) Grunder / Hartmann	$4,159	$1,188	
12	CCT Mixed Doubles Cup Geising; Geising, Germany, Oct. 26–29	(Russia) Bryzgalova / Krushelnitskiy	(Sweden) C. Noreen / P. Noreen	€3,500		
14	International Mixed Doubles Sochi; Sochi, Russia, Nov. 9–12	(Norway) Skaslien / Nedregotten	(Russia) Bryzgalova / Krushelnitskiy	$12,733	$4,456	
14	MOPAC Mixed Doubles Championship; Portland, Oregon, Nov. 10–12	(United States) Good / Guy	(United States) Horten / Seymour	USD $1,000		
15	Mixed Doubles Bern; Bern, Switzerland, Nov. 17–19	(Russia) Bryzgalova / Krushelnitskiy	(Switzerland) Perret / Rios	CHF 10,000		
16	Twin Ports Mixed Doubles Classic; Duluth, Minnesota, Nov. 24–26	(United States) Sinclair / Dropkin	(United States) Persinger / Zezel	USD $14,000		
19	Mixed Doubles Curling Challenge; Urdorf, Switzerland, Dec. 14–17	(Norway) Skaslien / Nedregotten	(Russia) Bryzgalova / Krushelnitskiy	CHF 2,200		
21	Southern States Mixed Doubles; Charlotte, North Carolina, Dec. 29–31	(Ontario) K. Cottrill / S. Cottrill	(United States) K. Shaw / M. Shaw	$4,286	$1,387	
22	International Mixed Doubles Trophy Aarau; Aarau, Switzerland, Jan. 5–7	(Russia) Bryzgalova / Krushelnitskiy	(Switzerland) Perret / Rios	$8,900	$3,306	
23	CCT Dutch Masters Mixed Doubles; Zoetermeer, Netherlands, Jan. 11–14	(Spain) Garcia / (Alberta) Bottcher	(Spain) Otaegi / Unanue	€1,000		
23	Stu Sells Mixed Doubles Championship; Toronto, Ontario, Jan. 13–14	(China) Wang / Ba	(Ontario) Sandham / Craig			
25	Gefle Mixed Doubles Cup; Gävle, Sweden, Jan. 26–28	(Scotland) Aitken / Mouat	(Switzerland) Perret / Rios	SEK 3,600		
28	CCT Tallinn Masters Mixed Doubles; Tallinn, Estonia, Feb. 16–18	(Czech Republic) Hájková / Paul	(Estonia) Turmann / Lill	€1,500		
28	Listowel Mixed Doubles Cashspiel; Listowel, Ontario, Feb. 16–18	(Ontario) Westlund-Stewart / Stewart	(Ontario) J. Murphy / H. Murphy			
30	International Mixed Doubles Sochi 2 Sochi, Russia, Mar. 1–4	(Russia) Moskaleva / Eremin	(Russia) Komarova / Goriachev	USD $10,000		
31	Slovakia Mixed Doubles Curling Cup; Bratislava, Slovakia, Mar. 8–11	(Scotland) Aitken / Mouat	(Hungary) Szekeres / Nagy	€2,000		
32	Westbay Hungarian Mixed Doubles Cup; Budapest, Hungary, Mar. 15–18	(Hungary) Szekeres / Nagy	(Russia) Moskaleva / Eremin	€3,100		
33	International Mixed Doubles Dumfries; Dumfries, Scotland, Mar. 22–25	(Scotland) Stirling / Kingan	(Switzerland) Jäggi / Michel	£4,900		
34	Latvian Mixed Doubles Curling Cup 1 Riga, Latvia, Mar. 29–Apr. 1	(Russia) Moskaleva / Eremin	(Italy) Zappone / Gonin	€1,000		
36	Latvian Mixed Doubles Curling Cup 2 Riga, Latvia, Apr. 12–15	(Scotland) Stirling / Kingan	(Switzerland) Jäggi / Michel	€1,000		
39	WCT Arctic Cup; Dudinka, Russia, May 23–28	(Alberta) Homan / (Sweden) Edin	(Scotland) Aitken / Menzies	USD $20,000		

== WCT Order of Merit rankings ==
Men

After Week 38 (Final)
#	Skip	Points
1	(Newfoundland and Labrador) Brad Gushue	521.230
2	(Sweden) Niklas Edin	496.980
3	(Alberta) Kevin Koe	457.631
4	(Manitoba) Mike McEwen	378.886
5	(Switzerland) Peter de Cruz	363.860
6	(Scotland) Bruce Mouat	347.048
7	(Ontario) Brad Jacobs	289.034
8	(Alberta) Brendan Bottcher	283.097
9	(Manitoba) Jason Gunnlaugson	276.286
10	(Manitoba) Reid Carruthers	270.599

Women

After Week 38 (Final)
#	Skip	Points
1	(Manitoba) Jennifer Jones	498.079
2	(Sweden) Anna Hasselborg	459.028
3	(Ontario) Rachel Homan	372.294
4	(Alberta) Chelsea Carey	367.847
5	(Scotland) Eve Muirhead	358.537
6	(Manitoba) Kerri Einarson	357.686
7	(United States) Jamie Sinclair	317.251
8	(Switzerland) Silvana Tirinzoni	288.607
9	(South Korea) Kim Eun-jung	279.916
10	(United States) Nina Roth	273.910

== WCT Money List ==
Men

After Week 38 (Final)
#	Skip	$ (CAD)
1	(Sweden) Niklas Edin	$132,775
2	(Newfoundland and Labrador) Brad Gushue	$124,760
3	(Alberta) Kevin Koe	$112,800
4	(Manitoba) Mike McEwen	$106,960
5	(Scotland) Bruce Mouat	$78,7279
6	(Switzerland) Peter de Cruz	$73,775
8	(Ontario) Brad Jacobs	$67,300
7	(Manitoba) Reid Carruthers	$61,400
9	(Ontario) John Epping	$59,915
10	(Manitoba) Jason Gunnlaugson	$57,500

Women

After Week 38 (Final)
#	Skip	$ (CAD)
1	(Manitoba) Jennifer Jones	$153,798
2	(United States) Jamie Sinclair	$73,657
3	(Sweden) Anna Hasselborg	$71,161
4	(Russia) Anna Sidorova	$70,495
5	(Alberta) Chelsea Carey	$69,700
6	(Switzerland) Alina Paetz	$62,317
7	(Manitoba) Kerri Einarson	$61,400
8	(Switzerland) Silvana Tirinzoni	$55,334
9	(United States) Nina Roth	$52,145
10	(Scotland) Eve Muirhead	$50,857

== Notes ==
Preceded by 2016–17	2017–18 curling season May 2017 – May 2018	Succeeded by 2018–19
