= List of teams on the 2017–18 World Curling Tour =

Following is a list of teams on the 2017–18 World Curling Tour, which was part of the 2017-18 curling season. Only the skips of the teams are listed.

== Men's ==
As of December 11, 2017

- (Japan) Shinya Abe
- (Saskatchewan) Carson Ackerman
- (Saskatchewan) Jason Ackerman
- (Ontario) Rob Ainsley
- (Alberta) Guy Algot
- (Ontario) Steve Allen
- (Alberta) Ted Appelman
- (Nova Scotia) Trevor Archibald
- (Russia) Evgeniy Arkhipov
- (Manitoba) Rob Atkins
- (Switzerland) Felix Attinger
- (Manitoba) Daryl Bachalo
- (United States) Josh Bahr
- (British Columbia) Chris Baier
- (Alberta) Kurt Balderston
- (Manitoba) Travis Bale
- (Ontario) Greg Balsdon
- (Switzerland) Christian Bangerter
- (Germany) Alexander Baumann
- (Ontario) Mark Bice
- (Manitoba) Daniel Birchard
- (United States) Todd Birr
- (Switzerland) Dimitri Boada
- (Manitoba) David Bohn
- (Manitoba) Dennis Bohn
- (Newfoundland and Labrador) Adam Boland
- (Alberta) Brendan Bottcher
- (Nova Scotia) Peter Boudreau
- (Scotland) Tom Brewster
- (British Columbia) Richard Brower
- (Alberta) Brian Brown
- (United States) Craig Brown
- (Switzerland) Rolf Bruggmann
- (Scotland) Cameron Bryce
- (Saskatchewan) Randy Bryden
- (Nova Scotia) Mike Callaghan
- (Manitoba) Braden Calvert
- (Manitoba) Reid Carruthers
- (Saskatchewan) Adam Casey
- (Ontario) Jordan Chandler
- (United States) Jack Clasen
- (United States) Stu Cohen
- (Manitoba) Joseph Comte
- (United States) Nicholas Connolly
- (Ontario) Al Corbeil
- (United States) Brandon Corbett
- (Ontario) Denis Cordick
- (British Columbia) Miles Craig
- (Alberta) Warren Cross
- (Alberta) Scott Cruickshank
- (Ontario) Neil Currie
- (Nova Scotia) Mark Dacey
- (Alberta) Chad Dahlseide
- (Saskatchewan) Mitchell Dales
- (British Columbia) Neil Dangerfield
- (Switzerland) Peter de Cruz
- (Nova Scotia) Nicholas Deagle
- (Saskatchewan) Carl deConinck Smith
- (Saskatchewan) Ryan Deis
- (Ontario) Dayna Deruelle
- (Nova Scotia) Paul Dexter
- (Ontario) Ian Dickie
- (New Brunswick) Paul Dobson
- (Manitoba) Tyler Drews
- (United States) Tim Drobnick
- (Scotland) Greg Drummond
- (Ontario) Connor Duhaime
- (England) Greg Dunn
- (United States) Scott Dunnam
- (Quebec) Simon Dupuis
- (Alberta) Kelsey Dusseault
- (United States) Garnet Eckstrand
- (British Columbia) Wylie Eden
- (Sweden) Niklas Edin
- (United States) Greg Eigner
- (Ontario) John Epping
- (Russia) Alexander Eremin
- (Ontario) Andrew Fairfull
- (United States) Pete Fenson
- (Quebec) Martin Ferland
- (Ontario) Pat Ferris
- (United States) Craig Fischer
- (Saskatchewan) Colton Flasch
- (Nova Scotia) Mike Flemming
- (Manitoba) Hayden Forrester
- (Manitoba) Kyle Foster
- (Quebec) Michael Fournier
- (New Brunswick) Ryan Freeze
- (Israel) Adam Freilich
- (Manitoba) Joshua Friesen
- (Alberta) Rhett Friesz
- (Japan) Hiromitsu Fujinaka
- (Alberta) Trevor Funk
- (Quebec) François Gagné
- (Alberta) Scott Garnett
- (British Columbia) Sean Geall
- (Alberta) Jeff Ginter
- (Ontario) Matt Glandfield
- (Ontario) Chris Glibota
- (Alberta) Dale Goehring
- (Japan) Masahiko Goto
- (Alberta) Scott Grassie
- (Manitoba) Sean Grassie
- (New Brunswick) James Grattan
- (Ontario) Brent Gray
- (Manitoba) Stuart Gresham
- (Alberta) Colin Griffith
- (British Columbia) Jeff Guignard
- (Latvia) Ritvars Gulbis
- (Manitoba) Jason Gunnlaugson
- (Newfoundland and Labrador) Brad Gushue
- (Ontario) Matthew Hall
- (United States) Todd Hammond
- (United States) Ian Harley
- (Alberta) Neil Hart
- (Saskatchewan) Jeff Hartung
- (Alberta) Jeremy Harty
- (Manitoba) Jamie Hay
- (Ontario) Cory Heggestad
- (Saskatchewan) Brad Heidt
- (Saskatchewan) Drew Heidt
- (Saskatchewan) Josh Heidt
- (Switzerland) Christian Heinimann
- (Switzerland) Jan Hess
- (Switzerland) Yves Hess
- (Nova Scotia) Nick Hilton
- (United States) Timothy Hodek
- (Quebec) Steve Holdaway
- (Quebec) Mark Homan
- (Ontario) Tanner Horgan
- (United States) Darryl Horsman
- (Ontario) Glenn Howard
- (United States) Jeremy Hozjan
- (Alberta) Colin Huber
- (Manitoba) Andrew Hunt
- (Alberta) Mike Hutchings
- (Japan) Kenji Iwasaki
- (United States) Bret Jackson
- (British Columbia) Glen Jackson
- (Ontario) Brad Jacobs
- (Saskatchewan) Jason Jacobson
- (Alberta) Ryan Jacques
- (Poland) Borys Jasiecki
- (British Columbia) Dean Joanisse
- (Alberta) Rob Johnson
- (Ontario) Dylan Johnston
- (New Brunswick) Scott Jones
- (Switzerland) Björn Jungen
- (Japan) Junpei Kanda
- (Japan) Arihito Kasahara
- (Finland) Aku Kauste
- (Ontario) Mark Kean
- (Ontario) Doug Kee
- (Ontario) Dale Kelly
- (Saskatchewan) Brady Kendel
- (Alberta) Chris Kennedy
- (South Korea) Kim Chang-min
- (South Korea) Kim Soo-hyuk
- (Alberta) Jamie King
- (Saskatchewan) Rylan Kleiter
- (Northwest Territories) Jamie Koe
- (Alberta) Kevin Koe
- (Ontario) Colin Koivula
- (Japan) Kenji Komoda
- (Japan) Nobukazu Komoribayashi
- (Denmark) Mikkel Krause
- (Ontario) Richard Krell
- (Japan) Hiromitsu Kuriyama
- (Alberta) Josh Lambden
- (Ontario) Rick Law
- (Saskatchewan) Steve Laycock
- (United States) Bob Leclair
- (Manitoba) Julien Leduc
- (South Korea) Lee Jae-beom
- (United States) Alex Leichter
- (Alberta) Jacob Libbus
- (Estonia) Harri Lill
- (Sweden) Kristian Lindström
- (China) Liu Rui
- (Ontario) Rob Lobel
- (British Columbia) Mark Longworth
- (Manitoba) Trevor Loreth
- (Manitoba) Tanner Lott
- (Switzerland) Lucien Lottenbach
- (Manitoba) Mark Lukowich
- (Manitoba) William Lyburn
- (China) Ma Xiuyue
- (Sweden) Patric Mabergs
- (Nova Scotia) Brent MacDougall
- (Alberta) Rob Maksymetz
- (New Brunswick) Jeremy Mallais
- (Nova Scotia) Matthew Manuel
- (Manitoba) Kelly Marnoch
- (Quebec) Yannick Martel
- (Ontario) Codey Maus
- (Nova Scotia) Robert Mayhew
- (United States) Justin McBride
- (United States) Heath McCormick
- (Ontario) Gary McCullough
- (United States) Patrick McDonald
- (Manitoba) Mike McEwen
- (Saskatchewan) Darrell McKee
- (Ontario) Mike McLean
- (British Columbia) Kelly McQuiggan
- (Ontario) Tim Meadows
- (Alberta) Terry Meek
- (Norway) Steffen Mellemseter
- (Brazil) Marcelo Mello
- (Quebec) Jean-Michel Ménard
- (Slovakia) David Misun
- (British Columbia) Jason Montgomery
- (Minnesota) Josh Moore
- (United States) Michael Moore
- (Quebec) Pierre-Luc Morissette
- (Japan) Yusuke Morozumi
- (British Columbia) John Morris
- (Scotland) Bruce Mouat
- (United States) John Paul Munich
- (Manitoba) Richard Muntain
- (Nova Scotia) Jamie Murphy
- (United States) Sean Murray
- (United States) Kroy Nernberger
- (Japan) Shungo Nomizo
- (United States) William Nordine
- (Alberta) Adam Norget
- (United States) Andrew Nottingham
- (New Brunswick) Terry Odishaw
- (Newfoundland and Labrador) Frank O'Driscoll
- (Nova Scotia) Alan O'Leary
- (Japan) Ryo Ogihara
- (Japan) Koto Onodera
- (Alberta) Shane Parcels
- (Ontario) Greg Park
- (Alberta) Kevin Park
- (British Columbia) Jason Peckham
- (United States) Greg Persinger
- (Manitoba) Daley Peters
- (Nova Scotia) Blair Pettipas
- (Switzerland) Marc Pfister
- (Alberta) Rick Phillips
- (British Columbia) Brent Pierce
- (Alberta) Graham Powell
- (Nova Scotia) Greg Power
- (Nova Scotia) Owen Purcell
- (Ontario) Rob Retchless
- (Italy) Joel Retornaz
- (Ontario) Spencer Richmond
- (United States) Cameron Rittenour
- (Quebec) Vincent Roberge
- (Ontario) Charlie Robert
- (New Brunswick) Alex Robichaud
- (Ontario) Sebastien Robillard
- (Ontario) Brent Ross
- (Quebec) Jean-Sébastien Roy
- (Alberta) Michael Roy
- (Manitoba) JT Ryan
- (Japan) Yasuhiro Sano
- (Northwest Territories) Nick Saturnino
- (Nova Scotia) Scott Saunders
- (United States) Greg Schatzman
- (British Columbia) Stephen Schneider
- (Switzerland) Yannick Schwaller
- (Switzerland) Kim-Lloyd Sciboz
- (Yukon) Thomas Scoffin
- (United States) Tom Scott
- (Ontario) Nicholas Servant
- (Ontario) Daryl Shane
- (Chinese Taipei) Randolph Shen
- (Ontario) Michael Shepherd
- (Alberta) Danny Sherrard
- (Japan) Kanya Shimizuno
- (United States) John Shuster
- (British Columbia) Lyle Sieg
- (Czech Republic) David Šik
- (Manitoba) Pat Simmons
- (Newfoundland and Labrador) Trent Skanes
- (Alberta) Aaron Sluchinski
- (Latvia) Kārlis Smilga
- (Newfoundland and Labrador) Greg Smith
- (Manitoba) Jordan Smith
- (Scotland) Kyle Smith
- (Manitoba) Riley Smith
- (Czech Republic) Jiri Snitil
- (United States) Darryl Sobering
- (Yukon) Jon Solberg
- (Switzerland) Stefan Stähli
- (Alberta) John Steel
- (British Columbia) Tracy Steinke
- (Ontario) John Steski
- (Nova Scotia) Chad Stevens
- (Saskatchewan) Braeden Stewart
- (Quebec) Jeffrey Stewart
- (Denmark) Rasmus Stjerne
- (United States) Andrew Stopera
- (United States) Bill Stopera
- (Russia) Alexey Stukalskiy
- (Alberta) Karsten Sturmay
- (United States) Matt Sussman
- (Japan) Gaku Suzuki
- (Denmark) Torkil Svensgaard
- (Czech Republic) Krystof Tabery
- (New Brunswick) Wayne Tallon
- (British Columbia) Tyler Tardi
- (Alberta) Charley Thomas
- (Newfoundland and Labrador) Colin Thomas
- (Nova Scotia) Kendal Thompson
- (Nova Scotia) Stuart Thompson
- (Russia) Alexey Timofeev
- (Ontario) Brandon Tippin
- (Saskatchewan) Travis Tokarz
- (Latvia) Mārtiņš Trukšāns
- (Japan) Shunto Tsuchiya
- (Japan) Suguru Tsukamoto
- (Ontario) Wayne Tuck Jr.
- (Norway) Thomas Ulsrud
- (Japan) Kazuhisa Unoura
- (Alberta) Thomas Usselman
- (Netherlands) Jaap van Dorp
- (Ontario) Chris Van Huyse
- (Alberta) Daylan Vavrek
- (Spain) Sergio Vez
- (Latvia) Kristaps Vilks
- (Estonia) Mihhail Vlassov
- (Saskatchewan) Shane Vollman
- (Lithuania) Tadas Vyskupaitis
- (Norway) Steffen Walstad
- (China) Wang Zhiyu
- (Manitoba) Zachary Wasylik
- (Alberta) Scott Webb
- (Sweden) Anders Westerberg
- (Alberta) Wade White
- (United States) Willie Wilberg
- (Ontario) John Willsey
- (Ontario) Jim Wilson
- (Ontario) Chris Wimmer
- (Manitoba) Joey Witherspoon
- (Austria) Sebastian Wunderer
- (Japan) Takefumi Yamashita
- (Alberta) Matt Yeo
- (China) Zou De Jia

== Women's ==
As of December 15, 2017

- (Ontario) Kristina Adams
- (United States) Emily Anderson
- (Saskatchewan) Sherry Anderson
- (Italy) Federica Apollonio
- (Manitoba) Meghan Armit
- (Ontario) Hailey Armstrong
- (New Brunswick) Jennifer Armstrong
- (Nova Scotia) Mary-Anne Arsenault
- (Ontario) Cathy Auld
- (Ontario) Courtney Auld
- (Alberta) Holly Baird
- (Alberta) Glenys Bakker
- (Russia) Maria Baksheeva
- (Saskatchewan) Brett Barber
- (Saskatchewan) Penny Barker
- (United States) Madison Bear
- (Quebec) Ève Bélisle
- (Belarus) Irina Belki
- (Manitoba) Hayley Bergman
- (Manitoba) Shae Bevan
- (Manitoba) Shannon Birchard
- (United States) Regan Birr
- (Alberta) Hannah Bouvier
- (Nova Scotia) Theresa Breen
- (Latvia) Madara Brēmane
- (Nova Scotia) Jill Brothers
- (British Columbia) Corryn Brown
- (Manitoba) Joelle Brown
- (Manitoba) Laura Burtnyk
- (Ontario) Dawn Butler
- (Ontario) Chrissy Cadorin
- (Manitoba) Alyssa Calvert
- (Alberta) Chelsea Carey
- (Manitoba) Katie Chappellaz
- (Saskatchewan) Candace Chisholm
- (United States) Cory Christensen
- (Manitoba) Jennifer Clark-Rouire
- (New Brunswick) Justine Comeau
- (British Columbia) Shiela Cowan
- (Manitoba) Amy Currie
- (Newfoundland and Labrador) Stacie Curtis
- (Nova Scotia) Calissa Daly
- (British Columbia) Sarah Daniels
- (Russia) Anastasiia Danshina
- (Alberta) Delia DeJong
- (Manitoba) Jackie Dewar
- (British Columbia) Holly Donaldson
- (Yukon) Chelsea Duncan
- (Ontario) Hollie Duncan
- (Denmark) Madeleine Dupont
- (Nova Scotia) Emily Dwyer
- (Saskatchewan) Chantelle Eberle
- (Manitoba) Kerri Einarson
- (Saskatchewan) Sara England
- (Manitoba) Michelle Englot
- (England) Lisa Farnell
- (United States) Cora Farrell
- (Switzerland) Binia Feltscher
- (Ontario) Allison Flaxey
- (Scotland) Hannah Fleming
- (Saskatchewan) Shalon Fleming
- (Ontario) Sarah Fletcher
- (Ontario) Tracy Fleury
- (Ontario) Grace Francisci
- (Saskatchewan) Rachel Fritzler
- (Ontario) Susan Froud
- (Japan) Satsuki Fujisawa
- (Northwest Territories) Kerry Galusha
- (Ontario) Jaimee Gardner
- (Italy) Diana Gaspari
- (South Korea) Gim Un-chi
- (New Brunswick) Shelly Graham
- (British Columbia) Diane Gushulak
- (British Columbia) Kayte Gyles
- (Scotland) Claire Hamilton
- (Alberta) Teryn Hamilton
- (New Brunswick) Heidi Hanlon
- (Ontario) Jacqueline Harrison
- (Alberta) Michelle Hartwell
- (Sweden) Anna Hasselborg
- (Switzerland) Marina Hauser
- (Ontario) Heather Heggestad
- (Switzerland) Ursi Hegner
- (New Brunswick) Kathy Hicks
- (Alberta) Krysta Hilker
- (Saskatchewan) Amber Holland
- (Ontario) Rachel Homan
- (Saskatchewan) Ashley Howard
- (Alberta) Jessie Hunkin
- (Ontario) Danielle Inglis
- (Scotland) Sophie Jackson
- (Nova Scotia) Virginia Jackson
- (Denmark) Angelina Jensen
- (Germany) Daniela Jentsch
- (Ontario) Kaitlin Jewer
- (China) Jiang Yilun
- (Nova Scotia) Colleen Jones
- (Manitoba) Jennifer Jones
- (Nova Scotia) Kaitlyn Jones
- (Alberta) Nicky Kaufman
- (Finland) Oona Kauste
- (Switzerland) Raphaela Keiser
- (South Korea) Kim Eun-jung
- (South Korea) Kim Min-ji
- (Alberta) Shannon Kleibrink
- (Czech Republic) Linda Klimova
- (British Columbia) Patti Knezevic
- (Japan) Tori Koana
- (Czech Republic) Anna Kubešková
- (British Columbia) Alyssa Kyllo
- (Nova Scotia) Isabelle Ladouceur
- (Saskatchewan) Stefanie Lawton
- (Ontario) Cassandra Lewin
- (Manitoba) Kim Link
- (Estonia) Tene Link
- (Ontario) Erin Macaulay
- (Nova Scotia) Kristen MacDiarmid
- (Nova Scotia) Shelley MacNutt
- (Prince Edward Island) Robyn MacPhee
- (Estonia) Triin Madisson
- (Ontario) Colleen Madonia
- (Alberta) Lindsay Makichuk
- (New Brunswick) Sarah Mallais
- (Alberta) Jodi Marthaller
- (Saskatchewan) Nancy Martin
- (Japan) Chiaki Matsumura
- (Nova Scotia) Mary Mattatall
- (Ontario) Krista McCarville
- (Nova Scotia) Nancy McConnery
- (Manitoba) Deb McCreanor
- (Nova Scotia) Julie McEvoy
- (Manitoba) Tiffany McLean
- (United States) Christine McMakin
- (China) Mei Jie
- (Manitoba) Briane Meilleur
- (Manitoba) Lisa Menard
- (Ontario) Sherry Middaugh
- (Newfoundland and Labrador) Cindy Miller
- (Russia) Victoria Moiseeva
- (Russia) Daria Morozova
- (Ontario) Erin Morrissey
- (Scotland) Eve Muirhead
- (New Brunswick) Heather Munn
- (Ontario) Jestyn Murphy
- (Japan) Mayu Natsuizaka
- (Alberta) Deanne Nichol
- (Sweden) Anette Norberg
- (Japan) Ayumi Ogasawara
- (South Korea) Oh Eun-jin
- (British Columbia) Lori Olsen
- (Switzerland) Alina Pätz
- (Hungary) Dorottya Palancsa
- (Lithuania) Virginija Paulauskaitė
- (Belarus) Alina Pavlyuchik
- (Ontario) Brittany Pearce
- (Quebec) Roxane Perron
- (Manitoba) Beth Peterson
- (British Columbia) Dailene Pewarchuk
- (Nova Scotia) Colleen Pinkney
- (Poland) Marta Pluta
- (United States) Ann Podoll
- (Alberta) Geri-Lynn Ramsay
- (Manitoba) Cheryl Reed
- (United States) Kim Rhyme
- (Manitoba) Darcy Robertson
- (New Brunswick) Sylvie Robichaud
- (Alberta) Kelsey Rocque
- (United States) Nina Roth
- (Ontario) Breanna Rozon
- (Latvia) Ieva Rudzīte
- (Japan) Mone Ryokawa
- (Alberta) Deb Santos
- (Alberta) Casey Scheidegger
- (Germany) Andrea Schöpp
- (United States) Jessica Schultz
- (Alberta) Nadine Scotland
- (Alberta) Holly Scott
- (Nova Scotia) Sharon Sellars
- (Saskatchewan) Mandy Selzer
- (Alberta) Marla Sherrer
- (British Columbia) Kelly Shimizu
- (Russia) Anna Sidorova
- (Sweden) Margaretha Sigfridsson
- (Saskatchewan) Robyn Silvernagle
- (Alberta) Ashton Simard
- (United States) Jamie Sinclair
- (Alberta) Kayla Skrlik
- (British Columbia) Kim Slattery
- (Alberta) Ocean Smart
- (Prince Edward Island) Veronica Smith
- (Manitoba) Barb Spencer
- (Quebec) Laurie St-Georges
- (Latvia) Iveta Staša-Šaršūne
- (Switzerland) Elena Stern
- (Alberta) Kristen Streifel
- (Alberta) Selena Sturmay
- (Sweden) Tova Sundberg
- (Ontario) Sierra Sutherland
- (Alberta) Valerie Sweeting
- (Czech Republic) Hana Synácková
- (Poland) Marta Szeliga-Frynia
- (New Brunswick) Shannon Tatlock
- (Russia) Ekaterina Telnova
- (Nova Scotia) Celina Thompson
- (British Columbia) Karla Thompson
- (Ontario) Julie Tippin
- (Switzerland) Silvana Tirinzoni
- (Estonia) Marie Turmann
- (Manitoba) Terry Ursel
- (British Columbia) Kesa Van Osch
- (Manitoba) Rhonda Varnes
- (Russia) Anna Venevtseva
- (Ontario) Emma Wallingford
- (China) Wang Bingyu
- (China) Wang Zixin
- (British Columbia) Sarah Wark
- (Ontario) Katelyn Wasylkiw
- (Manitoba) Kristy Watling
- (Ontario) Ashley Waye
- (Switzerland) Chantale Widmer
- (Ontario) Barb Willemsen
- (Scotland) Maggie Wilson
- (Switzerland) Selina Witschonke
- (United States) Becca Wood
- (Sweden) Isabella Wranå
- (Switzerland) Nora Wüest
- (Alberta) Nola Zingel
