= 2017 HDF Insurance Shoot-Out =

- Host city: Edmonton, Alberta
- Arena: Saville Community Sports Centre
- Dates: September 14–17
- Winner: (Scotland) Team Muirhead
- Curling club: Dunkeld Curling Club
- Skip: Eve Muirhead
- Third: Anna Sloan
- Second: Vicki Adams
- Lead: Lauren Gray
- Finalist: (Sweden) Anna Hasselborg

The 2017 HDF Insurance Shoot-Out was held from September 14 to 17 at the Saville Community Sports Centre in Edmonton, Alberta. The event was held on Week 5 of the 2017–18 World Curling Tour. The total purse was CAD $32,000.

The event was a round robin with four pools followed by an eight-team playoff.

== Teams ==
Teams are listed as follows:

| Skip | Third | Second | Lead | Locale |
|---|---|---|---|---|
| Brett Barber | Alyssa Despins | Kristin Ochitwa | Robyn Despins | Biggar, Saskatchewan |
| Chelsea Carey | Cathy Overton-Clapham | Jocelyn Peterman | Laine Peters | Calgary, Alberta |
| Nadine Scotland | Heather Jensen | Rebecca Konschuh | Heather Rogers | Calgary, Alberta |
| Sherry Anderson | Kourtney Fesser | Krista Fesser | Karlee Korchinski | Saskatoon, Saskatchewan |
| Eve Muirhead | Anna Sloan | Vicki Adams | Lauren Gray | Perth, Scotland |
| Ayumi Ogasawara | Yumie Funayama | Kaho Onodera | Anna Ohmiya | Sapporo, Japan |
| Geri-Lynn Ramsay | Kelly Erickson | Brittany Tran | Claire Tully | Calgary, Alberta |
| Darcy Robertson | Karen Klein | Vanessa Foster | Theresa Cannon | Winnipeg, Manitoba |
| Holly Scott | Megan Anderson | Candace Read | Trina Ball | Alberta |
| Anna Sidorova | Margarita Fomina | Alexandra Raeva | Nkeirouka Ezekh | Moscow, Russia |
| Barb Spencer | Katie Spencer | Holly Spencer | Allyson Spencer | Winnipeg, Manitoba |
| Kristen Streifel | Danielle Schmiemann | Taylor Maschmeyer | Jesse Iles | Edmonton, Alberta |
| Nicky Kaufman | Melissa Pierce | Erica Ortt | Sarah More | Edmonton, Alberta |
| Rhonda Varnes | Jenna Loder | Katherine Doerksen | Danielle Robinson | Winnipeg, Manitoba |
| Wang Bingyu | Zhou Yan | Liu Jinli | Ma Jingyi | Harbin, China |
| Shannon Birchard | Nicole Sigvaldason | Sheyna Andries | Mariah Mondor | Winnipeg, Manitoba |
| Shannon Kleibrink | Sarah Wilkes | Kalynn Park | Alison Thiessen | Calgary, Alberta |
| Alina Pätz | Nadine Lehmann | Marisa Winkelhausen | Nicole Schwägli | Baden, Switzerland |
| Kim Eun-jung | Kim Kyeong-ae | Kim Seon-yeong | Kim Yeong-mi | Uiseong, South Korea |
| Kelsey Rocque | Laura Crocker | Taylor McDonald | Jen Gates | Edmonton, Alberta |
| Anna Hasselborg | Sara McManus | Agnes Knochenhauer | Sofia Mabergs | Sundbyberg, Sweden |
| Satsuki Fujisawa | Chinami Yoshida | Yumi Suzuki | Yurika Yoshida | Kitami, Japan |
| Val Sweeting | Lori Olson-Johns | Dana Ferguson | Rachelle Brown | Edmonton, Alberta |
| Jessie Hunkin | Holly Jamieson | Lynelle Mahe | Kim Curtin | Edmonton, Alberta |

== Round Robin Standings ==
| Pool A | W | L |
|---|---|---|
| (Alberta) Kelsey Rocque | 4 | 1 |
| (Alberta) Val Sweeting | 3 | 2 |
| (Alberta) Nadine Scotland | 3 | 2 |
| (Japan) Ayumi Ogasawara | 3 | 2 |
| (Saskatchewan) Sherry Anderson | 1 | 4 |
| (Alberta) Nicky Kaufman | 1 | 4 |

| Pool B | W | L |
|---|---|---|
| (Sweden) Anna Hasselborg | 4 | 1 |
| (Alberta) Chelsea Carey | 4 | 1 |
| (South Korea) Kim Eun-jung | 3 | 2 |
| (Saskatchewan) Brett Barber | 3 | 2 |
| (Manitoba) Barb Spencer | 1 | 4 |
| (Manitoba) Rhonda Varnes | 0 | 5 |

| Pool C | W | L |
|---|---|---|
| (Switzerland) Alina Pätz | 4 | 1 |
| (Alberta) Jessie Hunkin | 3 | 2 |
| (Japan) Satsuki Fujisawa | 3 | 2 |
| (Alberta) Kristen Streifel | 2 | 3 |
| (Manitoba) Shannon Birchard | 2 | 3 |
| (Russia) Anna Sidorova | 1 | 4 |

| Pool D | W | L |
|---|---|---|
| (Scotland) Eve Muirhead | 4 | 1 |
| (China) Wang Bingyu | 4 | 1 |
| (Manitoba) Darcy Robertson | 4 | 1 |
| (Alberta) Shannon Kleibrink | 2 | 3 |
| (Alberta) Geri-Lynn Ramsay | 1 | 4 |
| (Alberta) Holly Scott | 0 | 5 |

== Tiebreakers ==
(Due to the number of tiebreakers, games were limited to four ends, except for the Hunkin vs. Fujisawa game.)

To Quarterfinals
1 | (Alberta) Val Sweeting | 4
5 | (Japan) Ayumi Ogasawara | 3
4 | (Alberta) Nadine Scotland | 1
5 | (Japan) Ayumi Ogasawara | 2
1 | (Alberta) Val Sweeting | 3
2 | (Alberta) Jessie Hunkin | 2
2 | (Alberta) Jessie Hunkin | 6
3 | (Japan) Satsuki Fujisawa | 5

| Team | 1 | 2 | 3 | 4 | 5 | 6 | Final |
| (Alberta) Nadine Scotland | 0 | 0 | 1 | 0 | / | / | 1 |
| (Japan) Ayumi Ogasawara 🔨 | 0 | 1 | 0 | 1 | / | / | 2 |

| Team | 1 | 2 | 3 | 4 | 5 | 6 | Final |
| (Alberta) Val Sweeting | 0 | 0 | 3 | 0 | 1 | / | 4 |
| (Japan) Ayumi Ogasawara 🔨 | 0 | 1 | 0 | 2 | 0 | / | 2 |

| Team | 1 | 2 | 3 | 4 | 5 | 6 | 7 | 8 | Final |
| (Alberta) Jessie Hunkin 🔨 | 1 | 0 | 0 | 2 | 0 | 2 | 0 | 1 | 6 |
| (Japan) Satsuki Fujisawa | 0 | 0 | 1 | 0 | 2 | 0 | 2 | 0 | 5 |

| Team | 1 | 2 | 3 | 4 | 5 | 6 | Final |
| (Alberta) Val Sweeting 🔨 | 2 | 1 | 0 | 0 | / | / | 3 |
| (Alberta) Jessie Hunkin | 0 | 0 | 1 | 1 | / | / | 2 |

== Playoffs ==
Quarterfinals
1 | (Sweden) Anna Hasselborg | 6
8 | (Alberta) Val Sweeting | 0
4 | (Alberta) Chelsea Carey | 3
5 | (China) Wang Bingyu | 7
2 | (Scotland) Eve Muirhead | 8
7 | (Alberta) Kelsey Rocque | 4
3 | (Switzerland) Alina Pätz | 4
6 | (Manitoba) Darcy Robertson | 5

Semifinals
1 | (Sweden) Anna Hasselborg | 8
5 | (China) Wang Bingyu | 4
2 | (Scotland) Eve Muirhead | 5
6 | (Manitoba) Darcy Robertson | 3

Final
1 | (Sweden) Anna Hasselborg | 5
2 | (Scotland) Eve Muirhead | 7

=== Quarterfinals ===
Saturday, September 16, 8:00 pm

| Team | 1 | 2 | 3 | 4 | 5 | 6 | 7 | 8 | Final |
| (Sweden) Anna Hasselborg 🔨 | 0 | 0 | 5 | 1 | X | X | X | X | 6 |
| (Alberta) Val Sweeting | 0 | 0 | 0 | 0 | X | X | X | X | 0 |

| Team | 1 | 2 | 3 | 4 | 5 | 6 | 7 | 8 | Final |
| (Alberta) Chelsea Carey 🔨 | 0 | 0 | 2 | 1 | 0 | 0 | 0 | 0 | 3 |
| (China) Wang Bingyu | 0 | 1 | 0 | 0 | 2 | 1 | 0 | 3 | 7 |

| Team | 1 | 2 | 3 | 4 | 5 | 6 | 7 | 8 | Final |
| (Scotland) Eve Muirhead | 0 | 0 | 0 | 1 | 0 | 4 | 0 | 3 | 8 |
| (Alberta) Kelsey Rocque 🔨 | 0 | 0 | 1 | 0 | 1 | 0 | 2 | 0 | 4 |

| Team | 1 | 2 | 3 | 4 | 5 | 6 | 7 | 8 | Final |
| (Manitoba) Darcy Robertson | 0 | 3 | 0 | 0 | 1 | 1 | 0 | X | 5 |
| (Switzerland) Alina Pätz 🔨 | 2 | 0 | 1 | 0 | 0 | 0 | 1 | X | 4 |

=== Semifinals ===
Sunday, September 17, 9:30 am

| Team | 1 | 2 | 3 | 4 | 5 | 6 | 7 | 8 | Final |
| (Sweden) Anna Hasselborg 🔨 | 2 | 2 | 0 | 0 | 1 | 1 | 0 | 2 | 8 |
| (China) Wang Bingyu | 0 | 0 | 2 | 0 | 0 | 0 | 2 | 0 | 4 |

| Team | 1 | 2 | 3 | 4 | 5 | 6 | 7 | 8 | Final |
| (Scotland) Eve Muirhead 🔨 | 0 | 2 | 2 | 0 | 1 | 0 | 0 | X | 5 |
| (Manitoba) Darcy Robertson | 0 | 0 | 0 | 1 | 0 | 1 | 1 | X | 3 |

=== Final ===
Sunday, September 17, 1:00 pm

| Team | 1 | 2 | 3 | 4 | 5 | 6 | 7 | 8 | 9 | Final |
| (Sweden) Anna Hasselborg 🔨 | 0 | 2 | 0 | 0 | 0 | 2 | 1 | 0 | 0 | 5 |
| (Scotland) Eve Muirhead | 0 | 0 | 0 | 2 | 0 | 0 | 0 | 3 | 2 | 7 |
