= 2017 Women's Masters Basel =

- Host city: Basel, Switzerland
- Arena: Curlingzentrum Region Basel
- Dates: October 5-9
- Winner: (China) Wang Bingyu
- Curling club: Harbin CC, Harbin
- Skip: Wang Bingyu
- Third: Zhou Yan
- Second: Liu Jinli
- Lead: Ma Jingyi
- Finalist: (Switzerland) Binia Feltscher

The 2017 Women's Masters Basel was a curling tournament held from October 5 to 9 the Curlingzentrum Region Basel in Basel, Switzerland as part of the 2017–18 World Curling Tour. The event was held in a triple-knockout format.

== Teams ==
The teams are listed as follows:

Skip	Third	Second	Lead	Locale
Madeleine Dupont	Denise Dupont	Julie Hogh	Mathilde Halse	Hvidovre, Denmark
Binia Feltscher	Irene Schori	Franziska Kaufmann	Carole Howald	Flims, Switzerland
Hannah Fleming	Jennifer Dodds	Alice Spence	Vicky Wright	Lockerbie, Scotland
Satsuki Fujisawa	Chinami Yoshida	Yumi Suzuki	Yurika Yoshida	Kitami, Japan
Diana Gaspari	Veronica Zappone	Chiara Olivieri	Arianna Losano	Cortina d'Ampezzo, Italy
Marina Hauser	Jessica Jäggi	Cynthia Gertsch	Lara Moser	Dübendorf, Switzerland
Oona Kauste	Lotta Immonen	Eszter Juhász	Marija Salmiovirta	Hyvinkaa, Finland
Raphaela Keiser	Laura Engler	Vanessa Tonoli	Nehla Meier	Zug, Switzerland
Kim Eun-jung	Kim Kyeong-ae	Kim Seon-yeong	Kim Yeong-mi	Uiseong, South Korea
Anna Kubešková	Alžběta Baudyšová	Tereza Pliskova	Klara Svatonova	Prague, Czech Republic
Chiaki Matsumura	Emi Shimizu	Ikue Kitazawa	Hasumi Ishigooka	Karuizawa, Japan
Victoria Moiseeva	Uliana Vasilyeva	Galina Arsenkina	Julia Guzieva	St. Petersburg, Russia
Eve Muirhead	Anna Sloan	Vicki Adams	Lauren Gray	Perth, Scotland
Anette Norberg	Therese Westman	Johanna Heldin	Sarah Pengel	Stocksund, Sweden
Ayumi Ogasawara	Yumie Funayama	Kaho Onodera	Anna Ohmiya	Sapporo, Japan
Dorottya Palancsa	Henrietta Miklai	Nikolett Sándor	Vera Kalocsai	Budapest, Hungary
Anna Sidorova	Margarita Fomina	Alexandra Raeva	Nkeiruka Ezekh	Moscow, Russia
Almida de Val	Jennie Wåhlin	Margaretha Sigfridsson (skip)	Fanny Sjöberg	Sundbyberg, Sweden
Iveta Staša-Šaršūne	Ieva Krusta	Santa Blumberga	Evelina Barone	Riga, Latvia
Briar Hürlimann	Elena Stern (skip)	Lisa Gisler	Celine Koller	Wetzikon, Switzerland
Wang Bingyu	Zhou Yan	Liu Jinli	Ma Jingyi	Harbin, China
Lara Stocker	Chantale Widmer (skip)	Larissa Berchtold	Roxanne Heritier	Schaffhausen, Switzerland
Selina Witschonke	Elena Mathis	Melina Bezzola	Anna Gut	Luzern, Switzerland

== Knockout results ==
The draw is listed as follows:

=== A event ===
First Knockout		Semifinals		Qualifier 1
(Scotland) Eve Muirhead	4
(Switzerland) Chantale Widmer	3	(Scotland) Eve Muirhead	5
(Czech Republic) Anna Kubešková	3	(Switzerland) Ursi Hegner	3
(Switzerland) Ursi Hegner	5			(Scotland) Eve Muirhead	3
(Sweden) Margaretha Sigfridsson	8			(Japan) Satsuki Fujisawa	5
(Latvia) Iveta Staša-Šaršūne	4	(Sweden) Margaretha Sigfridsson	4
(Finland) Oona Kauste	4	(Japan) Satsuki Fujisawa	5
(Japan) Satsuki Fujisawa	6

First Knockout		Semifinals		Qualifier 2
(Russia) Anna Sidorova	8
(Switzerland) Marina Hauser	3	(Russia) Anna Sidorova	2
(Japan) Chiaki Matsumura	6	(Japan) Chiaki Matsumura	6
(Switzerland) Elena Stern	2			(Japan) Chiaki Matsumura	4
(Scotland) Hannah Fleming	7			(Scotland) Hannah Fleming	5
(Switzerland) Selina Witschonke	2	(Scotland) Hannah Fleming	5
(South Korea) Kim Eun-jung	4	(Sweden) Anette Norberg	4
(Sweden) Anette Norberg	5

First Knockout		Semifinals		Qualifier 3
(China) Wang Bingyu	5
(Switzerland) Raphaela Keiser	4	(China) Wang Bingyu	7
(Hungary) Dorottya Palancsa	8	(Hungary) Dorottya Palancsa	1
(Japan) Ayumi Ogasawara	4			(China) Wang Bingyu	8
(Italy) Diana Gaspari	2			(Denmark) Madeleine Dupont	2
(Russia) Victoria Moiseeva	6	(Russia) Victoria Moiseeva	3
(Denmark) Madeleine Dupont	5	(Denmark) Madeleine Dupont	4
(Switzerland) Binia Feltscher	2

=== B event ===
Qualifier 4 (top half)
(Switzerland) Chantale Widmer	5
(Czech Republic) Anna Kubešková	4
(Latvia) Iveta Staša-Šaršūne	8
(Finland) Oona Kauste	2

Quarterfinals
(Switzerland) Raphaela Keiser	7
(Switzerland) Chantale Widmer	3
(Japan) Ayumi Ogasawara	6
(Latvia) Iveta Staša-Šaršūne	3

Semifinals
(Switzerland) Raphaela Keiser	6
(Sweden) Anette Norberg	7
(Japan) Ayumi Ogasawara	2
(Russia) Victoria Moiseeva	6

To Final
(Sweden) Anette Norberg	4
(Russia) Victoria Moiseeva	3

Qualifier 4 (bottom half)
(Switzerland) Marina Hauser	2
(Switzerland) Elina Stern	10

Quarterfinals
(Italy) Diana Gaspari	6
(Switzerland) Elena Stern	2

Semifinals
(Italy) Diana Gaspari	8
(Sweden) Margaretha Sigfridsson	3

To Final
(Italy) Diana Gaspari	5
(Japan) Chiaki Matsumura	7
Qualifier 4
(Sweden) Anette Norberg	3
(Japan) Chiaki Matsumura	8

Qualifier 5 (top half)		To final
		(Russia) Anna Sidorova	7
(Russia) Anna Sidorova	7	(Scotland) Eve Muirhead	3
(Hungary) Dorottya Palancsa	2

Qualifier 5 (bottom half)
(Switzerland) Selina Witschonke	3
(South Korea) Kim Eun-jung	6

Quarterfinals
(Switzerland) Binia Feltscher	6
(South Korea) Kim Eun-jung	5

Semifinals
(Switzerland) Ursi Hegner	2
(Switzerland) Binia Feltscher	10

To Final
(Denmark) Madeleine Dupont	3
(Switzerland) Binia Feltscher	7
Qualifier 5
(Russia) Anna Sidorova	5
(Switzerland) Binia Feltscher	8

=== C event ===
Quarterfinals		Semifinals		Qualifier 6
(Switzerland) Raphaela Keiser	7
(Hungary) Dorottya Palancsa	5	(Switzerland) Raphaela Keiser	5
		(Denmark) Madeleine Dupont	3
				(Switzerland) Raphaela Keiser	4
				(Sweden) Anette Norberg	5

Qualifier 7 (top half)
(Finland) Oona Kauste	3
(Switzerland) Marina Hauser	6

Quarterfinals
(Switzerland) Marina Hauser	3
(Switzerland) Chantale Widmer	5

Semifinals
(Switzerland) Chantale Widmer	6
(Switzerland) Ursi Hegner	5

To Final
(Switzerland) Chantale Widmer	1
(Scotland) Eve Muirhead	6

Qualifier 7 (bottom half)
(Czech Republic) Anna Kubešková	8
(Switzerland) Selina Witschonke	2

Quarterfinals
(Czech Republic) Anna Kubešková	9
(Latvia) Iveta Staša-Šaršūne	6

Semifinals
(Sweden) Margaretha Sigfridsson	8
(Czech Republic) Anna Kubešková	4

To Final
(Sweden) Margaretha Sigfridsson	6
(Russia) Victoria Moiseeva	4
Qualifier 7
(Scotland) Eve Muirhead	7
(Sweden) Margaretha Sigfridsson	6

Round of 16
(Switzerland) Elena Stern	3
(South Korea) Kim Eun-jung	9

Quarterfinals
(Japan) Ayumi Ogasawara	2
(South Korea) Kim Eun-jung	8

Semifinals
(South Korea) Kim Eun-jung	8
(Italy) Diana Gaspari	1

Qualifier 8
(South Korea) Kim Eun-jung	9
(Russia) Anna Sidorova	5

== Playoffs ==
Quarterfinals
(Japan) Satsuki Fujisawa	5
(South Korea) Kim Eun-jung	4
(China) Wang Bingyu	7
(Sweden) Anette Norberg	2
(Japan) Chiaki Matsumura	3
(Switzerland) Binia Feltscher	6
(Scotland) Hannah Fleming	5
(Scotland) Eve Muirhead	4

Semifinals
(Japan) Satsuki Fujisawa	4
(China) Wang Bingyu	5
(Switzerland) Binia Feltscher	8
(Scotland) Hannah Fleming	1

Final
(China) Wang Bingyu	9
(Switzerland) Binia Feltscher	3
