= Hokkaido Kitami Hokuto High School =

High school in Kitami, Hokkaido, Japan

Coordinates: 43.8117°N 143.8867°E

Hokkaido Kitami Hokuto High School (北海道北見北斗高等学校, Hokkaidō Kitami Hokuto Kōtō Gakkō) is a high school in Kitami, Hokkaido, Japan, founded in 1922. Hokkaido Kitami Hokuto High School is one of high schools administrated by Hokkaido.

The school is operated by the Hokkaido Prefectural Board of Education.

== Notable alumni ==
- Akio Sugino (杉野 昭夫) Anime Director, Character Designer, and Screenwriter.
- Umeji Sasaki (佐々木 梅治) Actor and Voice Actor.
- Satsuki Fujisawa (藤澤 五月) Curler.

== Address and access ==
- Address: Hokuto-cho 1-choume-1, Kitami, Hokkaido
- Access: Hokkaido Kitami Bus - Hokuto Kōkō Bus stop (北斗高校)
