= 2017 New Scotland Clothing Ladies Cashspiel =

The 2017 New Scotland Clothing Ladies Cashspiel was held October 6 to 9 at the CFB Curling Club in Halifax, Nova Scotia as part of the 2017-18 World Curling Tour.

== Teams ==
The teams are listed as follows:

Skip	Third	Second	Lead	Locale
Theresa Breen	Marlee Powers	Jocelyn Adams	Amanda Simpson	Halifax, Nova Scotia
Jill Brothers	Erin Carmody	Sarah Murphy	Jenn Brine	Halifax, Nova Scotia
Mary Mattatall (Fourth)	Marg Cutcliffe (Skip)	Jill Alcoe-Holland	Andrea Saulnier	Halifax, Nova Scotia
Calissa Daly	Kristen Lind	Mandi Newhook	Hailey Silver	Halifax, Nova Scotia
Emily Dwyer	Karlee Jones	MacKenzie Proctor	Shelley Barker	Halifax, Nova Scotia
Kaitlyn Jones	Kristin Clarke	Karlee Burgess	Lindsey Burgess	Chester, Nova Scotia
Isabelle Ladouceur	Emilie Proulx	Kate Callaghan	Makayla Harnish	Halifax, Nova Scotia
Julie McEvoy	Danielle Parsons	Sheena Moore	Jill Thomas	Halifax, Nova Scotia
Mary Myketyn-Driscoll	Brigitte MacPhail	Kaitlyn Veitch	Michelle McDonald	Halifax, Nova Scotia
Celina Thompson	Liz Garnett	Mandy Grace	Dalyce Wilson	Halifax, Nova Scotia

== Round-robin standings ==
Key
Teams to Playoffs

Pool A	W	L
(Nova Scotia) Jill Brothers	3	1
(Nova Scotia) Julie McEvoy	2	2
(Nova Scotia) Celina Thompson	2	2
(Nova Scotia) Calissa Daly	2	2
(Nova Scotia) Emily Dwyer	1	3

Pool B	W	L
(Nova Scotia) Kaitlyn Jones	4	0
(Nova Scotia) Mary Myketyn-Driscoll	2	2
(Nova Scotia) Marg Cutcliffe	2	2
(Nova Scotia) Isabelle Ladouceur	1	3
(Nova Scotia) Theresa Breen	1	3

=== Playoffs ===
Semifinals		Final
(Nova Scotia) Jill Brothers	6
(Nova Scotia) Mary-Myketyn-Driscoll	2	(Nova Scotia) Jill Brothers	2
(Nova Scotia) Kaitlyn Jones	6	(Nova Scotia) Kaitlyn Jones	3
(Nova Scotia) Julie McEvoy	4
