= 2018 Listowel Mixed Doubles Cashspiel =

2018 Listowel Mixed Doubles Cash Spiel
- Host city: Listowel, Ontario
- Arena: Listowel Curling Club
- Dates: Feb 16–18
- Winner: (Ontario) N. Stewart / T. Stewart
- Curling club: KW Granite Club
- Female: Nicole Westlund Stewart
- Male: Tyler Stewart
- Finalist: (Ontario) J. Murphy / H. Murphy

The 2018 Listowel Mixed Doubles Cashspiel was a curling event held from March 31 to April 2 at the Listowel Curling Club in Listowel, Ontario as part of the World Curling Tour. The event was held in a round robin format.

== Teams ==
The teams are listed as follows:

Female	Male	Locale
Carrie Burden	Alex Robertson	St.Mary's, Ontario
Katie Cottrill	Shaun Cottrill	Listowel, Ontario
Brianne Donegan	Sam Steep	Listowel, Ontario
Brenda Edger	Lorne Koch	Vanastra, Ontario
Farzana Husain	Rayad Husain	Georgetown, Guyana
Sherry Just	Ryan Deis	Fox Valley, Saskatchewan
Catherine Liscomb	Chris Liscomb	Ilderton, Ontario
Kaitlyn Little	Matt Trennum	Niagara Falls, Ontario
Janet Murphy	Hugh Murphy	Mississauga, Ontario
Jessica Shipmkaker	Craig Shinde	Mississauga, Ontario
Laurie Nuhn	Dennis Nuhn	Listowel, Ontario
Elana Sone	Leonid Rivkind	Metulla, Israel
Kimberly Tuck	Wayne Tuck Jr.	Ilderton, Ontario
Nicole Westlund Stewart	Tyler Stewart	Kitchener-Waterloo, Ontario
Lauren Wasylkiw	Shane Konings	Unionville, Ontario
Crimson White	George White	St.Mary's, Ontario

== Round robin standings ==
Final round robin standings

Key
Teams to Playoffs
Teams to Tiebreakers

Pool A	W	L
(Ontario) K. Cottrill / S. Cottrill	2	1
(Ontario) Shipmaker / Shinde	2	1
(Ontario) Donnegan / Steep	2	1
(Ontario) Edger / Koch	0	3

Pool B	W	L
(Saskatchewan) Just / Deis	3	0
(Ontario) J. Murphy / H. Murphy	2	1
(Ontario) L. Nuhn / D. Nuhn	1	2
(Ontario) Burden / Robertson	0	3

Pool C	W	L
(Israel) Sone / Rivkind	2	1
(Ontario) Ca. Liscumb / Ch. Liscumb	2	1
(Ontario) K. Tuck / W. Tuck	2	1
(Ontario) Little / Trenum	0	3

Pool D	W	L
(Ontario) Stewart / Tyler Stewart	3	0
(Guyana) R.Husain / F.Husain	2	1
(Ontario) Wasylkiw / Konings	1	2
(Ontario) C. White / G. White	0	3

== Tiebreakers ==
- (Guyana) R. Husain / F. Husain 7-8 (Ontario) Donnegan / Steep
- (Ontario) Shipmaker / Shinde 1-9 (Ontario) K. Tuck / W. Tuck

== Playoffs ==
Quarterfinals
1	(Saskatchewan) Just / Deis	1
8	(Ontario) K. Tuck / W. Tuck	7
4	(Ontario) J. Murphy / H. Murphy	6
5	(Israel) Sone / Rivkind	4
2	(Ontario) Stewart / Tyler Stewart	9
7	(Ontario) Donnegan / Steep	3
3	(Ontario) K. Cottrill / S. Cottrill	7
6	(Ontario) Ca. Liscumb / Ch. Liscumb	8

Semifinals
8	(Ontario) K. Tuck / W. Tuck	4
4	(Ontario) J. Murphy / H. Murphy	10
2	(Ontario) Stewart / Tyler Stewart	9
6	(Ontario) Ca. Liscumb / Ch. Liscumb	7

Final
4	(Ontario) J. Murphy / H. Murphy	4
2	(Ontario) Stewart / Tyler Stewart	7
