= Everest Curling Challenge =

- Host city: Fredericton, New Brunswick
- Arena: Willie O'Ree Place
- Dates: August 25–27
- Winner: Team Gushue
- Skip: Brad Gushue
- Third: Cathy Overton-Clapham
- Second: E. J. Harnden
- Lead: Lisa Weagle
- Finalist: Team Epping

The Everest Curling Challenge was a made-for-TV curling tournament that was held August 25 to 27, 2017 at the Willie O'Ree Place in Fredericton, New Brunswick. The event featured a grand prize of $200,000 for the winning team, the largest curling cash prize in curling history.

The event featured eight mixed curling teams made up of the best men's and women's teams in Canada. The teams were selected in a draft by the eight skips invited to the event, Chelsea Carey, John Epping, Brad Gushue, Rachel Homan, Brad Jacobs, Jennifer Jones, Kevin Koe and Val Sweeting. All games were televised on TSN.

A new rule was incorporated into the event; if at the end of an end, a team had a rock completely covering the button, that team would score an extra point.

In the final, Gushue and his chosen rink of Cathy Overton-Clapham, E. J. Harnden and Lisa Weagle defeated Epping and his team of Kaitlyn Lawes, Brent Laing and Rachelle Brown by a score of 6–5.

According to event organizers, the event was sold out.

== Teams ==
Skip	Third	Second	Lead
Chelsea Carey	Ryan Fry	Dana Ferguson	Ben Hebert
John Epping	Kaitlyn Lawes	Brent Laing	Rachelle Brown
Brad Gushue	Cathy Overton-Clapham	E. J. Harnden	Lisa Weagle
Rachel Homan	Mathew Camm	Jill Officer	Geoff Walker
Brad Jacobs	Lori Olson-Johns	Brett Gallant	Laine Peters
Jennifer Jones	Marc Kennedy	Joanne Courtney	Tim March
Kevin Koe	Emma Miskew	Patrick Janssen	Dawn McEwen
Val Sweeting	Mark Nichols	Jocelyn Peterman	Ryan Harnden

== Bracket ==
Quarterfinals
Team Jones	6
Team Jacobs	11
Team Homan	4
Team Gushue	8
Team Koe	10
Team Carey	5
Team Sweeting	4
Team Epping	6

Semifinals
Team Jacobs	0
Team Gushue	9
Team Koe	2
Team Epping	7

Final
Team Gushue	6
Team Epping	5

== Scores ==
=== Quarterfinals ===
Friday, August 25, 7:30 pm

Team	1	2	3	4	5	6	7	8	Final
Team Jones	2	0	2	0	0	0	2	X	6
Team Jacobs	0	4	0	2	1	4	0	X	11

Saturday, August 26, 10:00 am

Team	1	2	3	4	5	6	7	8	Final
Team Sweeting	0	0	0	1	0	2	0	1	4
Team Epping	0	1	1	0	1	0	3	0	6

Saturday, August 26, 2:00 pm

Team	1	2	3	4	5	6	7	8	Final
Team Koe	0	5	1	0	0	4	0	X	10
Team Carey	2	0	0	1	1	0	1	X	5

Saturday, August 26, 7:30 pm

Team	1	2	3	4	5	6	7	8	Final
Team Homan	0	0	0	1	0	0	3	X	4
Team Gushue	3	1	1	0	2	1	0	X	8

=== Semifinals ===
Saturday, August 26, 11:00 am

Team	1	2	3	4	5	6	7	8	Final
Team Koe	0	0	1	0	0	1	0	X	2
Team Epping	1	2	0	0	1	0	3	X	7

Saturday, August 26, 3:00 pm

Team	1	2	3	4	5	6	7	8	Final
Team Jacobs	0	0	0	0	0	0	X	X	0
Team Gushue	1	2	1	2	2	1	X	X	9

=== Final ===
Sunday, August 27, 7:30 pm

Team	1	2	3	4	5	6	7	8	Final
Team Gushue	3	0	0	0	0	2	0	1	6
Team Epping	0	0	1	1	1	0	2	0	5
