= 2017 Karuizawa International Curling Championships =

- Host city: Karuizawa, Japan
- Arena: Karuizawa Ice Park
- Dates: December 14-17
- Men's winner: Yusuke Morozumi
- Women's winner: (Hokkaido) Satsuki Fujisawa

The 2017 Karuizawa International Curling Championships were held from December 14 to 17 at the Karuizawa Ice Park in Karuizawa, Japan. It is part of the 2017-18 World Curling Tour.

== Men ==
=== Teams ===
The teams are listed as follows:

Skip	Third	Second	Lead	Locale
Yuta Matsumura (Fourth)	Yasumasa Tanida	Shinya Abe (Skip)	Kosuke Aita	Sapporo, Hokkaido
Benoît Schwarz (Fourth)	Claudio Pätz	Peter de Cruz (Skip)	Valentin Tanner	Geneva, Switzerland
Jumpei Kanda	Shota Iino	Shinya Iwamoto	Shotaro Hashimoto	Tokyo
Arihito Kasahara	Akira Otsuka	Tomoya Watanabe	Yuta Higuchi	Tokyo
Kim Chang-min	Seong Se-hyeon	Oh Eun-soo	Lee Ki-bok	Uiseong, South Korea
Kim Soo-hyuk	Kim Tae-hwan	Park Jong-deok	Nam Yun-ho	Gangwon Province, South Korea
Kenji Komoda	Hideyuki Sato	Naoyuki Den	Takashaki Koyanagi	Sagamihara, Kanagawa
Hiromitsu Kuriyama	Ryo Kawanishi	Katsuhito Sumi	Satoshi Koizumi	Nagano, Nagano
Patric Mabergs	Fredrik Nyman	Vincent Stenberg	Johnannes Patz	Skellefteå, Sweden
Hayato Matsumura	Rui Sato	Genya Nishizawa	Syu Kai	Karuizawa, Nagano
Yusuke Morozumi	Tetsuro Shimizu	Tsuyoshi Yamaguchi	Kosuke Morozumi	Karuizawa, Nagano
Ryo Ogihara	Kohei Okamura	Kizuki Ryokawa	Daiki Yamazaki	Karuizawa, Nagano
Hiromu Otani	Daiki Shikano	Yusuke Nonomura	Rui Ishida	Kitami, Hokkaido
Kanya Shimizuno	Ryota Meguro	Sota Hirosawa	Ryota Haeno	Furano, Hokkaido
Kyle Smith	Thomas Muirhead	Kyle Waddell	Cameron Smith	Perth, Scotland

=== Round-robin standings ===
Key
Teams to Playoffs

Pool A	W	L
(South Korea) Kim Chang-min	4	0
(Sweden) Patric Mabergs	3	1
Junpei Kanda	2	2
Hiromu Otani	1	3
Hiromitsu Kuriyama	0	4

Pool B	W	L
Yusuke Morozumi	4	0
(Switzerland) Peter de Cruz	3	1
Shinya Abe	2	2
Hayato Matsumura	1	3
Kenji Komoda	0	4

Pool C	W	L
(Scotland) Kyle Smith	4	0
(South Korea) Kim Soo-hyuk	3	1
Arihito Kasahara	2	2
Ryo Ogihara	1	3
Kanya Shimizuno	0	4

== Playoffs ==
Quarterfinals
1 Yusuke Morozumi	6
8 Junpei Kanda	3
4 (Sweden) Patric Mabergs	4
5 (South Korea) Kim Soo-hyuk	1
2 (South Korea) Kim Chang-min	6
7 Arhito Kasahara	3
3 (Scotland) Kyle Smith	6
6 (Switzerland) Peter de Cruz	4

Semifinals
1 Yusuke Morozumi	7
4 (Sweden) Patric Mabergs	1
2 (South Korea) Kim Chang-min	6
3 (Scotland) Kyle Smith	5

Final
1 Yusuke Morozumi	6
2 (South Korea) Kim Chang-min	5

== Women ==
=== Teams ===
The teams are listed as follows:

Skip	Third	Second	Lead	Locale
Satsuki Fujisawa	Chinami Yoshida	Yumi Suzuki	Yurika Yoshida	Kitami, Hokkaido
Gim Un-chi	Um Min-ji	Seol Ye-eun	Yeom Yoon-jung	Gyeonggi-do, South Korea
Anna Hasselborg	Sara McManus	Agnes Knochenhauer	Sofia Mabergs	Sundbyberg, Sweden
Kang Sue-yoen	Kim Eun-bi	Chung Jae-yi	Hyoung Bo-ram	Seoul, South Korea
Kim Eun-jung	Kim Kyeong-ae	Kim Seon-yeong	Kim Yeong-mi	Uiseong, South Korea
Junko Nishimuro (Fourth)	Tori Koana (Skip)	Yuna Kotani	Mao Ishigaki	Yamanashi, Yamanashi
Chiaki Matsumura	Emi Shimizu	Ikue Kitazawa	Hasumi Ishigooka	Karuizawa, Nagano
Eve Muirhead	Anna Sloan	Vicki Adams	Lauren Gray	Perth, Scotland
Mayu Natsuizaka	Haruka Fujii	Mari Ikawa	Tamaki Kogawa	Sapporo, Hokkaido
Ayumi Ogasawara	Yumie Funayama	Kaho Onodera	Anna Ohmiya	Sapporo, Hokkaido
Oh Eun-jin	Kim Su-ji	Kim Ji-hyeon	Park Jeong-hwa	Chuncheon, South Korea
Alina Pätz	Nadine Lehmann	Marisa Winkelhausen	Nicole Schwägli	Zürich, Switzerland
Ami Enami (Fourth)	Minori Suzuki	Sae Yamamoto	Mone Ryokawa (Skip)	Karuizawa, Nagano
Anna Sidorova	Margarita Fomina	Alexandra Raeva	Nkeiruka Ezekh	Moscow, Russia
Silvana Tirinzoni	Manuela Siegrist	Esther Neuenschwander	Marlene Albrecht	Aarau, Switzerland

=== Round-robin standings ===
Key
Teams to Playoffs

Pool A	W	L
(South Korea) Gim Un-chi	4	0
(Scotland) Eve Muirhead	3	1
Chiaki Matsumura	2	2
(Switzerland) Alina Patz	1	3
Mayu Natsuizaka	0	4

Pool A	W	L
(Sweden) Anna Hasselborg	4	0
(Russia) Anna Sidorova	3	1
Satsuki Fujisawa	2	2
(South Korea) Kang Sue-yoen	1	3
Mone Ryokawa	0	4

Pool C	W	L
(Switzerland) Silvana Tirinzoni	3	1
Ayumi Ogasawara	3	1
(South Korea) Oh Eun-jin	2	2
(South Korea) Kim Eun-jung	2	2
Tori Koana	0	3

=== Round-robin results ===
All draw times listed in Japan Standard Time (UTC+9).

== Playoffs ==
Quarterfinals
1 (South Korea) Gim Un-chi	3
8 Chiaki Matsumura	5
4 (Russia) Anna Sidorova	5
5 Ayumi Ogasawara	6
2 (Sweden) Anna Hasselborg	5
7 Satsuki Fujisawa	6
3 (Switzerland) Silvana Tirinzoni	5
6 (Scotland) Eve Muirhead	2

Semifinals
8 Chiaki Matsumura	6
5 Ayumi Ogasawara	3
7 Satsuki Fujisawa	6
3 (Switzerland) Silvana Tirinzoni	5

Final
8 Chiaki Matsumura	3
7 Satsuki Fujisawa	10
