= Leonid Rivkind =

Russian curler (born 1991)

Leonid Rivkind Леони́д Ри́вкинд
- Curler ♂
- Born: 23 January 1991 (age 35); Kaliningrad, Russia

Team
- Curling club: CK Albatros, Kaliningrad
- Mixed doubles partner: Elana Sone

Curling career
- Member Association: Russia, Israel
- World Mixed Doubles Championship: 3 (2016, 2017, 2018)
- European Championship: 3 (2015, 2016, 2017)
- Other appearances: World Mixed Championship: 1 (2017)
Medal record
Curling

Leonid Rivkind (Russian: Леони́д Ри́вкинд; born 23 January 1991 in Kaliningrad, Russia) is a Russian and Israeli male curler.

== Teams and events ==
=== Men's ===
Season	Skip	Third	Second	Lead	Alternate	Coach	Events
2009–10	Vitaly Karpinsky (fourth)	Sergei Belanov (skip)	Leonid Rivkind	Martin Levchuk	Mihail Rivkind		RMCCh 2010 (13th)
2012–13	Leonid Rivkind	Sergei Belanov	Grigory Stasyuk	Ruslan Reztsov	Valery Bolshakov	Sergei Belanov, Alisa Tregub	RMCCh 2013 (11th)
2015–16	Adam Freilich	Leonid Rivkind	Ariel Krasik-Geiger	Jeffrey Yaakov Lutz	Gabriel Kempenich	Calvin Edie	ECC 2015 (14th)
2016–17	Adam Freilich	Leonid Rivkind	Ariel Krasik-Geiger	Jeffrey Yaakov Lutz	Gabriel Kempenich	Calvin Edie	ECC 2016 (14)
2017–18	Adam Freilich (fourth)	Kevin Golberg (skip)	Leonid Rivkind	Gabriel Kempenich		Scott Hill	ECC 2017 (15th)

=== Mixed ===
Season	Skip	Third	Second	Lead	Alternate	Coach	Events
2008–09	Andrey Azarkevich	Julia Guzieva	Leonid Rivkind	Viktoria Dubrovskaya	Pavel Kolobuhov		RMxCCh 2009 (22nd)
2009–10	Vitaly Karpinsky	Alisa Tregub	Sergei Belanov	Julia Guzieva	Leonid Rivkind		RMxCCh 2010 (13th)
2010–11	Vitaly Karpinsky (fourth)	Julia Guzieva	Sergei Belanov (skip)	Susanna Gefel	Leonid Rivkind		RMxCCup 2010 (bronze)
2010–11	Vitaly Karpinsky	Julia Guzieva	Leonid Rivkind	Susanna Gefel	Sergei Belanov		RMxCCh 2011 (11th)
2011–12	Olga Jarkova	Alisa Tregub	Vitaly Karpinsky	Leonid Rivkind			RMxCCup 2011 (bronze)
2011–12	Olga Jarkova	Vitaly Karpinsky	Yulia Portunova	Leonid Rivkind	Julia Guzieva		RMxCCh 2012 (12th)
2012–13	Olga Jarkova	Leonid Rivkind	Yulia Portunova	Vitaly Karpinsky	Alisa Tregub (RMxCCup)	Sergei Belanov	RMxCCup 2012 (gold); RMxCCh 2013 (5th)
2017–18	Adam Freilich	Elana Sone	Leonid Rivkind	Andrea Stark		Sharon Cohen	WMxCC 2017 (9th)

=== Mixed doubles ===
Season	Male	Female	Coach	Events
2009–10	Leonid Rivkind	Yulia Portunova	Sergei Belanov, Alisa Tregub	RMDCCup 2009 (9th)
2010–11	Leonid Rivkind	Julia Guzieva		RMDCCup 2010 (5th)
2011–12	Leonid Rivkind	Julia Guzieva		RMDCCup 2011 (bronze)
2011–12	Leonid Rivkind	Julia Guzieva		RMDCCh 2012 (14th)
2015–16	Leonid Rivkind	Rachel Katzman	Simon Pack	WMDCC 2016 (33rd)
2016–17	Leonid Rivkind	Rachel Katzman	Simon Pack	WMDCC 2017 (26th)
2017–18	Leonid Rivkind	Elana Sone	Simon Pack	WMDCC 2018 (37th)
