= Kaitlyn Jones =

Canadian curler

- Curler
- Born: Kaitlyn Jones; March 21, 1998 (age 28); Thompson, Manitoba

Curling career
- Member Association: Saskatchewan (2014–2017); Nova Scotia (2017–2019; 2020–2021); Ontario (2019–2020); Manitoba (2020–present)
- Top CTRS ranking: 22nd (2021–22)
Medal record
Women's curling
Representing Canada
World Junior Championships
Gold medal – first place	2018 Aberdeen
Representing Saskatchewan
Canada Winter Games
Bronze medal – third place	2015 Prince George

Kaitlyn Jones (born March 21, 1998) is a Canadian curler from Winnipeg, Manitoba.

== Career ==
=== Juniors ===
Born in Thompson, Manitoba, Jones curled out of Chilliwack, British Columbia, New Aiyansh, British Columbia and Ontario before moving to Regina, Saskatchewan, where she competed in Saskatchewan's provincial junior championships in 2015, 2016 and 2017, winning in a provincial title in her last attempt. Her team of Sara England, Rayann Zerr and Shantel Hutton represented the province at the 2017 Canadian Junior Curling Championships. There, she led her team to a 5–5 record, missing the playoffs. The following season, Jones moved to Halifax, Nova Scotia, to skip a team of 2016 World Junior champions Kristin Clarke and Karlee Burgess along with Lindsey Burgess. The team represented Nova Scotia at the 2018 Canadian Junior Curling Championships, where they steamrolled through the round robin, losing just one game to finish first place. The team beat Quebec in the final, earning them the right to represent Canada at the 2018 World Junior Curling Championships. There, the team went 7–2 in the round robin, good enough for second place. In the playoffs, they beat China in the semifinal and then the first place and defending champion Isabella Wranå rink, representing Sweden in the final, to win the gold medal.

Jones also won the Saskatchewan U18 title in 2014 and won a bronze medal at the 2015 Canada Winter Games for Saskatchewan.

=== Women's ===
Jones won her first World Curling Tour title at the 2017 New Scotland Clothing Ladies Cashspiel. As World Junior champions, her team was invited to play in the 2018 Humpty's Champions Cup, Jones' first Grand Slam event. Her rink would not win any games. Her team was invited to play at the 2018 Masters held in Truro, Nova Scotia, as a local team. The team did very well there, going 3–1 in group play, but lost in the quarterfinal to Team Chelsea Carey.

Jones officially graduated to women's play in 2019. On April 2, 2019, she announced she would be skipping the team of Allison Flaxey, Clancy Grandy and Morgan Court for the 2019-20 season. The team did not have a great season, failing to win any tour events and not qualifying for the provincial championship. The team disbanded after just one season.

== Personal life ==
Jones was a student at Humber College studying Radio Broadcasting. She skipped the Humber Hawks Women's Curling Team to a gold medal in the OCAA Provincial Championship.
