= Satsuki Fujisawa =

Japanese curler (born 1991)

- Curler
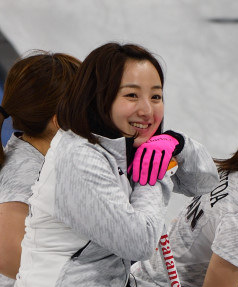
- Fujisawa in 2018
- Born: 24 May 1991 (age 35); Abashiri, Japan

Team
- Curling club: Loco Solare CC, Kitami, Japan
- Skip: Satsuki Fujisawa
- Third: Yako Matsuzawa
- Second: Yumi Suzuki
- Lead: Yurika Yoshida

Curling career
- Member Association: Japan
- World Championship: 4 (2013, 2016, 2023, 2026)
- World Mixed Doubles Championship: 2 (2018, 2019)
- Pacific-Asia Championship: 6 (2011, 2012, 2015, 2016, 2017, 2018)
- Pan Continental Championship: 3 (2022, 2023, 2025)
- Olympic: 2 (2018, 2022)
- Grand Slam victories: 1 (2023 Canadian Open)
Medal record
Women's Curling
Representing Japan
Olympic Games
Silver medal – second place	2022 Beijing	Team
Bronze medal – third place	2018 Pyeongchang	Team
World Championships
Silver medal – second place	2016 Swift Current
Pan Continental Curling Championships
Gold medal – first place	2022 Calgary
Silver medal – second place	2023 Kelowna
Pacific-Asia Championships
Gold medal – first place	2015 Almaty
Silver medal – second place	2012 Naseby
Silver medal – second place	2017 Erina
Silver medal – second place	2018 Gangneung
Bronze medal – third place	2016 Uiseong
Pacific Junior Championships
Gold medal – first place	2008 Jeonju City
Gold medal – first place	2009 Harbin
Asian Winter Games
Bronze medal – third place	2017 Sapporo
Representing Nagano
Japan Curling Championships
Gold medal – first place	2011 Nayoro
Gold medal – first place	2012 Aomori
Gold medal – first place	2013 Sapporo
Gold medal – first place	2014 Karuizawa
Bronze medal – third place	2010 Tokoro
Representing Hokkaido
Japan Curling Championships
Gold medal – first place	2016 Aomori
Gold medal – first place	2020 Karuizawa
Gold medal – first place	2022 Tokoro
Gold medal – first place	2023 Tokoro
Silver medal – second place	2017 Karuizawa
Silver medal – second place	2019 Sapporo
Silver medal – second place	2021 Wakkanai
Bronze medal – third place	2025 Yokohama

Satsuki Fujisawa (藤澤 五月, Fujisawa Satsuki; born 24 May 1991) is a Japanese curler from Kitami, Hokkaido. As a skip, she has won the Japanese national championship six times. Fujisawa skipped the bronze medal-winning Japanese team at the 2018 Winter Olympic Games and the silver medal-winning team at the 2022 Winter Olympics. She is currently the skip of the Loco Solare curling team.

== Career ==
Fujisawa's junior career began with a championship at the 2008 Pacific Junior Curling Championships over China's Sun Yue. This qualified her and her Japanese team for the 2008 World Junior Curling Championships, where they finished seventh with a 3–6 record. Fujisawa defended her Pacific Junior title by winning the 2009 Pacific Junior Curling Championships defeating China's Liu Jinli in the final. At the 2009 World Junior Curling Championships, she skipped Japan to a last-place (10th) finish and a 2–7 record.

In 2011, Fujisawa played in her first non-junior international event, skipping for Japan at the 2011 Pacific-Asia Curling Championships. She placed fourth at the event, finishing with a 2–6 record. Fujisawa won her first World Curling Tour event in 2012 by winning the 2012 Shamrock Shotgun over the South Korean national team, skipped by Kim Eun-jung. Later that year, she skipped Japan to a silver medal at the 2012 Pacific-Asia Curling Championships. Later in the season, she skipped the Japanese women's team to a seventh-place finish at the 2013 World Women's Curling Championship. In September 2013, Fujisawa and her Karuizawa-based rink, who had won the last three straight national championships, participated in the national trials for the 2013 Olympic Qualification Event. They lost the best-of-seven final of the trials to Ayumi Ogasawara's Sapporo-based rink in six games, which eliminated their chances of competing at the 2014 Winter Olympic Games.

Fujisawa left the team and joined Mari Motohashi's rink as skip in May 2015, moving from Karuizawa back to Kitami, where she had grown up and played juniors until 2009. Half a year later, Fujisawa and her new team represented Japan at the 2015 Pacific-Asia Curling Championships, where she led Japan to its first gold medal since 2005 by winning the final match against South Korea's Kim Ji-sun. Later that season, Fujisawa, with third Chinami Yoshida, second Yumi Suzuki, lead Yurika Yoshida, and alternate Mari Motohashi also competed for Japan at the 2016 World Women's Curling Championship in Swift Current, Canada. In the round-robin stage of the event, they finished second with a 9–2 record and advanced to the playoffs. They lost the 1 vs. 2 game to Binia Feltscher from Switzerland and then rebounded with a semifinal win over Russia's Anna Sidorova to earn a berth into the gold medal match. There, the Swiss team defeated Fujisawa's rink again but secured silver, Japan's first-ever podium finish at a world championship.

Fujisawa skipped the Japanese rink at the 2016 Pacific-Asia Curling Championships. After posting a 6–1 round robin record, tied with China and South Korea, her team would lose to China's Wang Bingyu in the semifinal. This meant that she could not defend her silver medal at the World Championships, as she had to make it to the finals to qualify Japan for the 2017 Worlds.

Fujisawa began the 2017–18 season by winning the Hokkaido Bank Curling Classic. The team won the 2017 Japanese Olympic Curling Trials in September 2017, defeating the Chiaki Matsumura rink three games to one in a best-of-five series. The team then went on to win a silver medal at the 2017 Pacific-Asia Curling Championships. After finishing in third after the double round robin with a record of 6–4, they upset China in the semifinal before losing to Korea in the final. The following month, she won her second tour event of the season, the 2017 Karuizawa International Curling Championship.

Fujisawa skipped the Japanese team that won the 2018 Olympics women curling bronze medal.

Fujisawa again represented Japan at the 2018 Pacific-Asia Curling Championships. She led her team to an undefeated 6–0 record in the round robin but lost to the Koreans (skipped by Kim Min-ji in the final. The next month, she represented Japan in the second leg of the 2018–19 Curling World Cup in Omaha, United States, which her team would end up winning, this time defeating Kim and her South Korean rink in the final.

Team Fujisawa began the 2019–20 season at the 2019 Hokkaido Bank Curling Classic, where they lost in the final to Jiang Yilun. Next, they won the ADVICS Cup. They had two more playoff appearances at their next two events, the Booster Juice Shoot-Out and the 2019 Colonial Square Ladies Classic, where they had semifinal and quarterfinal finishes, respectively. Next, they had a semifinal finish at the 2019 Curlers Corner Autumn Gold Curling Classic. In Grand Slam play, they made the quarterfinals at the Masters and the semifinals of the Tour Challenge, National and Canadian Open. They had two more playoff appearances on tour at the Red Deer Curling Classic, where they lost in the quarterfinals, and the Karuizawa International, where they lost the final to Anna Sidorova. For the first time in four seasons, Team Fujisawa won the Japan Curling Championships, defeating Seina Nakajima in the final. The team was set to represent Japan at the 2020 World Women's Curling Championship before the event got cancelled due to the COVID-19 pandemic. The Japanese Championship would be their last event of the season as both the Players' Championship and the Champions Cup Grand Slam events were also cancelled due to the pandemic.

Team Fujisawa played in no World Curling Tour events during the abbreviated 2020–21 season as there were no events held in Japan or Asia. The team would compete in the 2021 Japan Curling Championships, held from 8 to 14 February 2021 in Wakkanai, Hokkaido, as the defending champions. After an unblemished 6–0 round robin record, the team defeated Team Sayaka Yoshimura of Hokkaido Bank to advance to the final where they would once again face Yoshimura. Down one in the tenth, Team Yoshimura scored two points to win the national championship 7–6 over Team Fujisawa. This meant that once again, the team would not get to represent Japan at the World Championships. Team Fujisawa ended their season at the 2021 Champions Cup and 2021 Players' Championship Grand Slam events, which were played in a "curling bubble" in Calgary, Alberta, with no spectators, to avoid the spread of the coronavirus. The team had quarterfinal finishes at both events, losing out to Rachel Homan at the Champions Cup and Anna Hasselborg at the Players'.

In their first event of the 2021–22 season, Team Fujisawa finished runner-up at the 2021 Hokkaido Bank Curling Classic. They then played in the 2021 Japanese Olympic Curling Trials, which were held in a best-of-five contest between the Fujisawa and Sayaka Yoshimura rinks. After losing the first two games, Team Fujisawa rattled off three straight victories to win the trials and earn the right to represent Japan at the 2021 Olympic Qualification Event. There, the team finished third in the round robin and then defeated South Korea to secure their spot in the 2022 Winter Olympics. At the Games, Fujisawa led her team of Chinami Yoshida, Yumi Suzuki, Yurika Yoshida and Kotomi Ishizaki to a 5–4 round robin record, enough to qualify as the fourth seeds in the playoff round. They then defeated the number one seeds in Switzerland's Silvana Tirinzoni to advance to the Olympic final, where they would face Great Britain's Eve Muirhead. The team could not keep their momentum going in the final, however, dropping the match 10–3, earning the silver medal. Elsewhere on tour for the season, Team Fujisawa lost in the final of the 2021 Curlers Corner Autumn Gold Curling Classic after a previously undefeated record. In November, they went undefeated to claim the Red Deer Curling Classic. In Grand Slam play, they only qualified in one of three events they played in, the 2022 Players' Championship, where they reached the quarterfinals. The team wrapped up their season at the 2022 Japan Curling Championships. There, they went 7–1 through the round robin and won the 1 vs. 2 page playoff game over Hokkaido Bank. They then defeated the Ikue Kitazawa's Chubu Electric Power team 7–3 in the final to claim the national title.

The Fujisawa rink won their second event of the 2022–23 season, going undefeated to win the Advics Cup. At the 2022 National, the team went undefeated until the semifinals where they were stopped by Kerri Einarson 8–5. They also lost to Team Einarson at the next Slam, 6–5 in a tiebreaker. Because they won the 2022 national championship, Team Fujisawa represented Japan at the 2022 Pan Continental Curling Championships where they finished third in the round robin with a 6–2 record. They then beat Canada's Einarson in the semifinal before defeating Korea's Ha Seung-youn 8–6 in the championship game. The team again missed the playoffs at the 2022 Masters after a 1–3 record. In the new year, the team was the first qualifier at the 2023 Canadian Open, winning all three of their pre-qualifying matches. They then won 8–7 over Anna Hasselborg in the quarterfinals and 7–6 over Gim Eun-ji in the semifinals to reach their first Slam final. There, they became the first Asian team to win a Slam, excluding defunct events, with a 5–3 win over Team Einarson. Team Fujisawa won their second straight national title at the 2023 Japan Curling Championships, defeating SC Karuizawa Club's Asuka Kanai 7–5 in the final. This qualified them for the 2023 World Women's Curling Championship where they qualified for the playoffs with a 7–5 record. They were then eliminated by Canada 6–4 in the qualification round. They finished their season with a quarterfinal appearance at the 2023 Players' Championship and a semifinal appearance at the 2023 Champions Cup, losing out to the Einarson rink at both events.

For a second year in a row, Team Fujisawa won the Advics Cup to begin their season, going undefeated to claim the title. Because they defended their title at the national championship, they again represented Japan at the 2023 Pan Continental Curling Championships, this year finishing second through the round robin with a 6–1 record. In the semifinal, they stole the win against the United States' Tabitha Peterson before coming up short against Korea's Gim Eun-ji in the final, settling for silver. In December, the team went undefeated at the 2023 Western Showdown until the semifinal where they lost 6–2 to Jolene Campbell. In the new year, they could not defend their national title, failing to reach the playoff round of the 2024 Japan Curling Championships. They bounced back with a strong run at the Sun City Cup before losing the final to Isabella Wranå. In Grand Slam play, the team only qualified in one of five events during the 2023–24 season, losing in the quarterfinals of the 2024 Canadian Open to Team Einarson.

To begin the 2024–25 season, Loco Solare lost back-to-back finals at the Argo Graphics Cup and the 2024 Saville Shootout to Momoha Tabata. They next played in the 2024 AMJ Campbell Shorty Jenkins Classic where they lost in the semifinals to Silvana Tirinzoni. At the first Slam of the season, the 2024 Tour Challenge, they qualified for the playoffs through the C side, eventually being eliminated by Kerri Einarson in the semifinals. They also qualified at the next two slams before being knocked out in the quarterfinals. They lost a third final to Team Tabata at the Red Deer Curling Classic before again reaching the semifinals of the 2024 Western Showdown. To begin the second part of the season, they qualified for their fourth straight slam playoffs at the 2025 Masters, losing out to Kim Eun-jung in the quarterfinals. At the 2025 Japan Curling Championships, the team again failed at reclaiming the national title, falling to Team Tabata for a sixth time during the season in the semifinals. They ended their season with another semifinal appearance at the Gangneung Invitational before failing to qualify at the 2025 Players' Championship.

In the final year of the Olympic quadrennial, Team Fujisawa had a strong start in advance of the 2025 Japanese Olympic curling trials, winning both the 2025 Wakkanai Midori Challenge Cup and Advics Cup as well as finishing third at the 2025 Hokkaido Bank Curling Classic. Despite this, the team struggled at the Olympic Trials for the first time, losing consecutive matches Miyu Ueno and Sayaka Yoshimura in the round robin before falling in a tiebreaker 7–2 to Yoshimura. It marked the first time since 2018 that Team Fujisawa did not represent Japan at the Olympics. Still chasing qualification for the world championship, the team reached the final of the 2025 Canadian Open Slam, the quarterfinals at the 2025 GSOC Tahoe and finished second at the Sun City Cup. They also represented Japan at the 2025 Pan Continental Curling Championships, finishing fifth. With their strong play and points accumulated throughout the season, the team earned the right to compete in the 2026 World Women's Curling Championship. There, they qualified for the playoffs with a 9–3 record, only suffering losses to Canada, Scotland and Türkiye. They then avenged their loss against Türkiye in the qualification round before suffering back-to-back losses in the semifinal and bronze medal game to Canada and Sweden, settling for fourth. Following the season, longtime third Chinami Yoshida announced she would be stepping back from the team with Yako Matsuzawa being named as her replacement.

=== Mixed doubles ===
After the 2018 Olympics, Fujisawa was awarded a wild-card spot in the 2018 Japan Mixed Doubles Curling Championship with fellow Olympian Tsuyoshi Yamaguchi. Despite having never teamed together and having very little mixed doubles experience overall, Fujisawa and Yamaguchi went undefeated to win the championship and the right to represent Japan at the 2018 World Mixed Doubles Curling Championship, where they would finish fifth overall.

Fujisawa and Yamaguchi successfully defended their title in 2019, and represented Japan at the 2019 World Mixed Doubles Curling Championship. There, they made it to the quarterfinal, where they lost to Australia.

== Personal life ==
Fujisawa graduated from Hokkaido Kitami Hokuto High School in Kitami City in 2010. From then to early 2015, residing in Nagano Prefecture, she was employed as a curler and office worker for Chubu Electric Power, which has owned a competitive women's curling team based in Karuizawa, Nagano since 2009. Since returning to Kitami, she has been an employee of one of the local companies sponsoring her present team. She is currently an insurance agent.

Fujisawa began bodybuilding in 2023, and competed in the MOLA cup.

== Grand Slam record ==
Fujisawa and her team became the first Asian team to win a Grand Slam event (excluding defunct Slams) at the 2023 Canadian Open. China's Wang Bingyu had won the 2010 Curlers Corner Autumn Gold Curling Classic, which was considered a Slam at the time.

Key
C	Champion
F	Lost in Final
SF	Lost in Semifinal
QF	Lost in Quarterfinals
R16	Lost in the round of 16
Q	Did not advance to playoffs
T2	Played in Tier 2 event
DNP	Did not participate in event
N/A	Not a Grand Slam event that season

Event	2013–14	2014–15	2015–16	2016–17	2017–18	2018–19	2019–20	2020–21	2021–22	2022–23	2023–24	2024–25	2025–26	2026–27
Invitational	N/A	N/A	DNP	DNP	DNP	DNP	SF	N/A	N/A	Q	Q	SF	Q	Q
Masters	Q	DNP	DNP	DNP	DNP	Q	QF	N/A	Q	Q	Q	QF	Q	Q
National	N/A	N/A	DNP	DNP	DNP	QF	SF	N/A	Q	SF	Q	QF	QF	Q
Open	N/A	DNP	DNP	DNP	DNP	Q	SF	N/A	N/A	C	QF	QF	F	DNP
Players'	DNP	DNP	DNP	DNP	QF	QF	N/A	QF	QF	QF	Q	Q	Q	
Champions Cup	N/A	N/A	Q	DNP	DNP	DNP	N/A	QF	DNP	SF	N/A	N/A	N/A	N/A

=== Former events ===
Event	2011–12	2012–13	2013–14	2014–15
Autumn Gold	DNP	DNP	Q	SF
Manitoba Lotteries	Q	DNP	Q	N/A

== Teams ==
=== Women's ===
Season	Skip	Third	Second	Lead	Alternate	Events
2007–08	Satsuki Fujisawa	Shiori Fujisawa	Yui Okabe	Madoka Shinoo	Yukina Furuse	WJCC 2008
2008–09	Satsuki Fujisawa	Shiori Fujisawa	Yui Okabe	Madoka Shinoo	Kai Tsuchiya	WJCC 2009
2009–10	Satsuki Fujisawa	Miyo Ichikawa	Emi Shimizu	Miyuki Satoh		
2010–11	Satsuki Fujisawa	Miyo Ichikawa	Emi Shimizu	Miyuki Satoh	Chiaki Matsumura	
2011–12	Satsuki Fujisawa	Miyo Ichikawa	Emi Shimizu	Miyuki Satoh	Chiaki Matsumura	PACC 2011
2012–13	Satsuki Fujisawa	Miyo Ichikawa	Emi Shimizu	Chiaki Matsumura	Miyuki Satoh	PACC 2012, WWCC 2013
2013–14	Satsuki Fujisawa	Miyo Ichikawa	Emi Shimizu	Miyuki Satoh	Chiaki Matsumura	
2014–15	Satsuki Fujisawa	Emi Shimizu	Chiaki Matsumura	Ikue Kitazawa	Hasumi Ishigooka	
2015–16	Satsuki Fujisawa	Chinami Yoshida	Yumi Suzuki	Yurika Yoshida	Kotomi Ishizaki / Mari Motohashi	PACC 2015, WWCC 2016
2016–17	Satsuki Fujisawa	Chinami Yoshida	Yumi Suzuki	Yurika Yoshida	Mari Motohashi	PACC 2016
2017–18	Satsuki Fujisawa	Chinami Yoshida	Mari Motohashi / Yumi Suzuki	Yurika Yoshida	Yumi Suzuki / Mari Motohashi	PACC 2017, 2018 OG
2018–19	Satsuki Fujisawa	Chinami Yoshida	Yumi Suzuki	Yurika Yoshida	Kotomi Ishizaki	CWC, PACC 2018
2019–20	Satsuki Fujisawa	Chinami Yoshida	Yumi Suzuki	Yurika Yoshida		
2020–21	Satsuki Fujisawa	Chinami Yoshida	Yumi Suzuki	Yurika Yoshida		
2021–22	Satsuki Fujisawa	Chinami Yoshida	Yumi Suzuki	Yurika Yoshida	Kotomi Ishizaki	OQE 2021, 2022 OG
2022–23	Satsuki Fujisawa	Chinami Yoshida	Yumi Suzuki	Yurika Yoshida	Kotomi Ishizaki	PCCC 2022, WWCC 2023
2023–24	Satsuki Fujisawa	Chinami Yoshida	Yumi Suzuki	Yurika Yoshida	Kotomi Ishizaki	PCCC 2023
2024–25	Satsuki Fujisawa	Chinami Yoshida	Yumi Suzuki	Yurika Yoshida		
2025–26	Satsuki Fujisawa	Chinami Yoshida	Yumi Suzuki	Yurika Yoshida		PCCC 2025, WWCC 2026
2026–27	Satsuki Fujisawa	Yako Matsuzawa	Yumi Suzuki	Yurika Yoshida		

=== Mixed doubles ===
Season	Female	Male	Events
2017–18	Satsuki Fujisawa	Tsuyoshi Yamaguchi	WMDCC 2018
2018–19	Satsuki Fujisawa	Tsuyoshi Yamaguchi	WMDCC 2019
2019–20	Satsuki Fujisawa	Tsuyoshi Yamaguchi	
2020–21	Satsuki Fujisawa	Tsuyoshi Yamaguchi	
2021–22	Satsuki Fujisawa	Tsuyoshi Yamaguchi	
2022–23	Satsuki Fujisawa	Tsuyoshi Yamaguchi	
