= Australian Mixed Curling Championship =

- Established: 2015
- 2024 host city: Naseby, New Zealand
- 2024 arena: Naseby Curling Club
- 2023 champion: Matt Panoussi

The Australian Mixed Curling Championship is the national curling championship for mixed curling in Australia. The winners of the tournament will represent Australia at the World Mixed Curling Championship. Event organizer is Australian Curling Federation.

In mixed curling, the positions on a team must alternate between men and women. If a man throws last rocks, which is usually the case, the women must throw lead rocks and third rocks, while the other male member of the team throws second rocks.

== History ==
The tournament was started in 2015. The first championship had only two teams and was won by Ian Palangio's team with a record of 3–0 in best of five series.

The event typically held in June in conjunction with some other Australian Curling Championships.

== Champions and medalists ==
The past champions and medalists of the event are listed as follows:

Year	Host, Dates	Champion	Runner-up	Bronze	Result on Worlds
2015	Dunedin, New Zealand; June 5–7	Team Palangio: Ian Palangio, Kim Forge, Steve Johns, Anne Powell	Team Millikin: Hugh Millikin, Lyn Gill, Dean Hewitt, Carlee Millikin	—	29th
2016	Naseby, New Zealand; June 9–12	Team Millikin: Hugh Millikin, Kim Forge, Steve Johns, Helen Williams	Team Panoussi: Matt Panoussi, Jennifer Westhagen, Mitch Thomas, Stephanie Barr	Team Uren: Michael Uren, Caitlin Weaver, Ian Wright, Jane Wolyncevic	22nd
2017	Erina, New South Wales; October 26–29	Team Millikin: Hugh Millikin, Kim Forge, Chris Ordog, Helen Williams	Team Armstrong: Dustin Armstrong, Michelle Fredericks Armstrong, Keswick Pearson, Megan Bowes	Team Freshwater: Bruce Freshwater, Anne Powell, Pete Manasantivongs, Kate Hayes	26th
2018	Naseby, New Zealand; June 7–10	Team Panoussi: Matt Panoussi, Jennifer Westhagen, Gerald Chick, Stephanie Barr	Team Millikin: Hugh Millikin, Kim Forge, Steve Johns, Helen Williams	Team Williams: Sam Williams, Tahli Gill, Mitch Thomas, Kirby Gill	19th
2019	Naseby, New Zealand; June 10–12	Team Millikin: Hugh Millikin, Kim Forge, Steve Johns, Anne Powell	Team Armstrong: Dustin Armstrong, Helen Williams, James Boyd, Michelle Fredericks Armstrong	Team Panoussi: Matt Panoussi, Jennifer Westhagen, Gerald Chick, Stephanie Barr	26th
2020, 2021	cancelled due to COVID-19 pandemic				
2022	Naseby, New Zealand; August 19–21	Team Hlushak: Amanda Hlushak, Sean Hall, Anne Powell, Hugh Millikin	Team Armstrong: Dustin Armstrong, Helen Williams, James Boyd, Michelle Fredericks Armstrong	Team Panoussi: Matt Panoussi, Jennifer Westhagen, Gerald Chick, Sara Westman	14th
2023	Naseby, New Zealand; June 9–11	Team Panoussi: Matt Panoussi, Jennifer Westhagen, Gerald Chick, Beata Bowes	Team Armstrong: Dustin Armstrong, Helen Williams, James Boyd, Karen Titheridge	Team Millikin: Hugh Millikin, Carlee Millikin, Steve Johns, Veronica Johns	5th
2026	Naseby, New Zealand; July 13–17	Team Panoussi: Matt Panoussi, Jennifer Westhagen, Gerald Chick, Beata Bowes	Team Millikin: Hugh Millikin, Marcy Forge, Steve Johns, Carlee Millikin	Team Hall: Sean Hall, Amanda Hlushak, Sam Williams, Nicole Hewett	TBD

(skips marked bold)

== See also ==
- Australian Men's Curling Championship
- Australian Women's Curling Championship
- Australian Mixed Doubles Curling Championship
- Australian Junior Curling Championships
- Australian Senior Curling Championships
- Australian Wheelchair Curling Championship
