= Australian Mixed Doubles Curling Championship =

- Established: 2007
- 2023 host city: Naseby, New Zealand
- 2023 arena: Naseby Curling Club
- 2023 champion: Dean Hewitt / Tahli Gill

The Australian Mixed Doubles Curling Championship is the national curling championship for mixed doubles curling in Australia. The winners of the tournament will represent Australia at the World Mixed Doubles Curling Championship. Event organizer is Australian Curling Federation.

== Champions and medallists ==
The past champions and medallists of the event are listed as follows:

Year	Host, Dates	Champion (order: men, women)	Runner-up	Bronze	Result on Worlds
2007	Bendigo ?–? May	Gerald Chick, Jennifer Thomas	John Anderson, ?? (unknown)		17th (2008)
2008	Naseby, New Zealand; 19–21 July	Gerald Chick, Jennifer Thomas	Hugh Millikin, Kim Forge	Ted Bassett, Mona Bassett	23rd (2009)
2009	Naseby, New Zealand; 19–21 July	Hugh Millikin, Kim Forge	Stephen Johns, Lyn Gill	Ted Bassett, Diane Sheard	5th (2010)
2010	Naseby, New Zealand; 1–3 October	Hugh Millikin, Kim Forge	Stephen Johns, Lyn Gill	Dave Thomas, Jennifer Thomas	16th (2011)
2011	Melbourne ?–? September	Stephen Johns, Kim Forge	Gerald Chick, Jennifer Thomas	Dean Hewitt, Lynn Hewitt	24th (2012)
2012	Naseby, New Zealand; 6–9 September	Jay Merchant, Lyn Gill	Ian Palangio, Laurie Weeden	Stephen Johns, Kim Forge	22nd (2013)
2013	Naseby, New Zealand; 3–6 October	Ian Palangio, Laurie Weeden	Hugh Millikin, Carlee Millikin	Stephen Johns, Kim Forge	12th (2014)
2014	Naseby, New Zealand; 2–5 October	Stephen Johns, Kim Forge	Ian Palangio, Laurie Weeden	Hugh Millikin, Carlee Millikin	28th (2015)
2015	Naseby, New Zealand; 1–4 October	Ian Palangio, Laurie Weeden	Hugh Millikin, Kim Forge	Dean Hewitt, Kristen Tsourlenes	31st (2016)
2016	Naseby, New Zealand; 18–21 August	Dean Hewitt, Lynn Hewitt	Ian Palangio, Laurie Weeden	Matt Panoussi, Jennifer Westhagen	18th (2017)
2017	Erina; 26–29 October	Dean Hewitt, Lynn Hewitt	Jay Merchant, Kim Forge	Hugh Millikin, Carlee Millikin	18th (2018)
2018	Naseby, New Zealand; 6–10 June	Dean Hewitt, Tahli Gill	Jay Merchant, Waverley Taylor	Matt Panoussi, Jennifer Westhagen	4th (2019)
2019	Naseby, New Zealand; 6–10 June	Dean Hewitt, Tahli Gill	Matt Panoussi, Jennifer Westhagen	Hugh Millikin, Carlee Millikin	13th (2020)
2020	cancelled due to COVID-19 pandemic				13th (2021)
2021	cancelled due to COVID-19 pandemic				11th (2022)
2022	Naseby, New Zealand; 16–18 December	Dean Hewitt, Tahli Gill	Matt Panoussi, Jennifer Westhagen	Nathan Francey, Jessica Boersen	8th (2023)
2023	Naseby, New Zealand; 18–20 September	Dean Hewitt, Tahli Gill	Joanne Robins, Nathan Francey		15th (2024)
2024	Naseby, New Zealand; 20–23 May	Dean Hewitt, Tahli Gill	Matt Panoussi, Jennifer Westhagen	Thomas Bence, Jayna Gill	(bronze) (2025)
2025	Naseby, New Zealand; 21–25 May	Dean Hewitt, Tahli Gill	Matt Panoussi, Jennifer Westhagen	Hugh Millikin, Carlee Millikin	(gold) (2026)
2026	Naseby, New Zealand; 23–27 May	Dean Hewitt, Jessica Wytrychowski	Thomas Bence, Marcy Forge	Sam Williams, Agnes Szentannai	... (2027)

== See also ==
- Australian Men's Curling Championship
- Australian Women's Curling Championship
- Australian Mixed Curling Championship
