= Australian Men's Curling Championship =

- Established: 1991
- 2024 host city: Naseby, New Zealand
- 2024 arena: Naseby Curling Club
- 2024 champion: Hugh Millikin

The Australian Men's Curling Championship is the national curling championship of men's curling in Australia. The winners of the tournament represent Australia at the Pan Continental Curling Championships (previously the Pacific-Asia Curling Championships). The event is organized by the Australian Curling Federation.

The event is normally held in Naseby, New Zealand, as Australia currently lacks a dedicated curling facility.

== Past champions ==
The past champions and medallists of the event are listed as follows:

Year	Host, Dates	Winning Team	Runner-up Team	Bronze Team	PACC/PCCC result
1991	—	Hugh Millikin, Tom Kidd, Daniel Joyce, Stephen Hewitt, alt.: Brian Stuart	—		1991; (gold)
1992	—	Hugh Millikin, Tom Kidd, Gerald Chick, Brian Johnson, alt.: Neil Galbraith	—		1992; (gold)
1993	—	Hugh Millikin, Tom Kidd, Gerald Chick, Stephen Hewitt, alt.: Brian Johnson	—		1993; (gold)
1994	—	Hugh Millikin, Stephen Johns, Gerald Chick, Stephen Hewitt	—		1994; (gold)
1995	—	Hugh Millikin, Stephen Johns, Gerald Chick, Andy Campbell	—		1995; (gold)
1996	—	Hugh Millikin, Gerald Chick, Stephen Johns, Stephen Hewitt	—		1996; (gold)
1997	—	Hugh Millikin, John Theriault, Stephen Johns, Trevor Schumm	—		1997; (gold)
1998	—	Hugh Millikin, John Theriault, Gerald Chick, Stephen Johns	—		1998; (bronze)
1999	—	Hugh Millikin, John Theriault, Gerald Chick, Stephen Johns	—		1999; (silver)
2000	—	Hugh Millikin, Gerald Chick, John Theriault, Stephen Johns	—		2000; (silver)
2001	Bendigo; 10-12 Aug	Hugh Millikin, Ian Palangio, John Theriault, Stephen Johns	Gerald Chick, Mark Wuschke, Jonathan Wade, Stephen Hewitt	—	2001; (bronze)
2002	Bendigo; 18-19 Aug	Hugh Millikin, Ian Palangio, John Theriault, Stephen Johns, alt.: Stephen Hewitt	Neil Barry, Gerald Chick, Donald Glendenning, Stephen Hewitt	Jonathan Wade, Mark Wuschke, Frederic Legrand, Frank Forster	2002; (silver)
2003	Bendigo; 8-11 Aug	Hugh Millikin, Ian Palangio, John Theriault, Stephen Johns	Ricky Tasker, Derril Palidwar, Rob Gagnon, Stephen Hewitt	Frederic Legrand, Mark Wuschke, Paul Dixon, Frank Forster	2003; (silver)
2004	Bendigo; 8-9 Aug	Hugh Millikin, Ian Palangio, John Theriault, Stephen Johns	Derril Palidwar, Andrew Butler, Rob Gagnon, John Pollock, alt.: Mark Wuschke	—	2004; (silver)
2005	—	Ian Palangio, Hugh Millikin, Ricky Tasker, Mike Woloschuk	—		2005; (gold)
2006	Bendigo; 22-23 July	Ian Palangio, Hugh Millikin, Sean Hall, Mike Woloschuk	Dave Thomas, David Imlah, Ali Cameron, Mark Wuschke	Gerald Chick, Paul Meissner, Matt Panoussi, Vaughan Rosier	2006; (gold)
2007	Bendigo; 28-29 July	Ian Palangio, Hugh Millikin, Sean Hall, Stephen Johns, alt.: Stephen Hewitt	Gerald Chick, Paul Meissner, Matt Panoussi, Vaughan Rosier	Dave Thomas, Mark Wuschke, Bill O'Chee, Murray Jacklin	2007; (silver)
2008	Dunedin; 17-22 July	Ian Palangio, Hugh Millikin, Sean Hall, Stephen Johns, alt.: Stephen Hewitt	Gerald Chick, Matt Panoussi, Paul Meissner, Vaughan Rosier	Dave Thomas, Tim McMahon, Ali Cameron, Phil Goschnick	2008; 5th
2009	Naseby; 5-7 June	Ian Palangio, Hugh Millikin, John Theriault, Ted Bassett	Matt Panoussi, ?, ?, ?	Dave Thomas, Ali Cameron, Tim McMahon, Nick Sheard	2009; 4th
2010	Naseby; 12-13 June	Ian Palangio, Hugh Millikin, Stephen Johns, Don Glendinning	Gerald Chick, Matt Panoussi, Paul Meissner, Vaughan Rosier	Tim McMahon, David Imlah, Angus Young, Phil Goschnick	2010; (bronze)
2011	Naseby; 10-12 June	Hugh Millikin, Ian Palangio, Jay Merchant, Stephen Johns	Matt Panoussi, Vaughan Rosier, Gerald Chick, Tim McMahon, alt.: Paul Meissner	Angus Young, Dean Hewitt, Stephen Hewitt, Brian Lee	2011; 4th
2012	Naseby; 8-10 June	Ian Palangio, Hugh Millikin, Sean Hall, Stephen Johns, alt.: Angus Young	Gerald Chick, Matt Panoussi, Vaughan Rosier, Paul Meissner, alt.: Rob Hanson	Dave Thomas, Phil Goschnick, Max Thomas, Bill O'Chee, Mark Wuschke	2012; (bronze)
2013	Dunedin; 7-9 June	Ian Palangio, Hugh Millikin, Duncan Clark, Angus Young, alt.: Stephen Johns	Gerald Chick, Matt Panoussi, Wyatt Buck, Vaughan Rosier	Dave Thomas, Ali Cameron, Phil Goschnick, Bill O'Chee	2013; 6th
2014	Dunedin; 6-8 June	Ian Palangio, Jay Merchant, Dean Hewitt, Shawn MacLachlan	Matt Panoussi, Vaughan Rosier, Max Thomas, Sam Williams	Hugh Millikin, Wyatt Buck, Stephen Johns, Angus Young	2014; 4th
2015	—	Ian Palangio, Jay Merchant, Dean Hewitt, Derek Smith	—		2015; 5th
2016	Naseby; 9-12 June	Ian Palangio, Jay Merchant, Dean Hewitt, Derek Smith	Tim McMahon, Geoff Davis, Tanner Davis, Angus Young	Matt Panoussi, Gerald Chick, Mitch Thomas, Sam Williams	2016; 7th
2017	Naseby; 9-12 June	Dean Hewitt, Ian Palangio, Chris Ordog, Hugh Millikin, alt.: Jay Merchant	Geoff Davis, Tanner Davis, Matt Panoussi, Sam Williams, alt.: Angus Young	Ian Gagnon, Bruce Freshwater, Pete Manasantivongs, Clive Webster	2017; 4th
2018	Naseby; 7-10 June	Dean Hewitt, Jay Merchant, Rupert Jones, Ian Palangio, alt.: Stephen Johns	Dustin Armstrong, James Boyd, Keswick Pearson, Hal Jenkins	Geoff Davis, Tanner Davis, Matt Panoussi, Angus Young	2018; 7th
2019	Naseby; 14-19 Aug	Dean Hewitt, Sean Hall, Tanner Davis, Jay Merchant	Hugh Millikin, Stephen Johns, Hamish Lorrain-Smith, Matthew Millikin	Dustin Armstrong, James Boyd, Keswick Pearson, Andrew Walker	2019; 6th
2020, 2021	Australian Championship cancelled due to COVID-19 pandemic				
2022	Naseby; 15-19 Aug	Dean Hewitt, Jay Merchant, Tanner Davis, Justin Grundy	Hugh Millikin, Matt Panoussi, Sean Hall, Derek Smith	Jonathan Imlah, Jordan Ensinger, Zach Boland, Emil Cooper	2022; 7th
2023	Naseby; 6-9 Jun	Dean Hewitt, Jay Merchant, Tanner Davis, Justin Grundy	Matt Panoussi, Gerald Chick, Derek Smith, Sam Williams	Hugh Millikin, Steve Johns, Mike Woloschuk, John Anderson	2023; 6th
2024	Naseby; 13-16 May	Dean Hewitt, Stephen Johns, Stephen Hewitt, Hugh Millikin	Sean Hall, Matt Panoussi, Derek Smith, Sam Williams	Ian Gagnon, Clive Webster, Bruce Freshwater, Ash Wood	

(skips marked bold)

== See also ==
- Australian Women's Curling Championship
- Australian Mixed Curling Championship
- Australian Mixed Doubles Curling Championship
- Australian Junior Curling Championships
- Australian Senior Curling Championships
- Australian Wheelchair Curling Championship
