= Australian Women's Curling Championship =

Curling competition in Australia

- Established: 1991
- 2024 host city: Naseby, New Zealand
- 2024 arena: Naseby Curling Club
- 2024 champion: Helen Williams

The Australian Women's Curling Championship is the national curling championship of women's curling in Australia. The winners of the tournament represent Australia at the Pan Continental Curling Championships (previously the Pacific-Asia Curling Championships). It is organized by the Australian Curling Federation.

The event is normally held in Naseby, New Zealand, as Australia currently lacks a dedicated curling facility.

== Past champions ==
The past champions and medallists of the event are listed as follows:

Year	Host, Dates	Winning Team	Runner-up Team	Bronze Team	PACC/PCCC result
1991	—N/a	Jacqueline Lund, Christine Guthrie, Janie Pirret, Tania Joyce, alternate: Rhonda Shallcross	—N/a		1991; (silver)
1992	Women's event not held				
1993	—N/a	Lynn Hewitt, Christine Traquair, Ellen Weir, Lyn Greenwood, alternate: Audrey Bedford	—N/a		1993; (silver)
1994	—N/a	Ellen Weir, Lyn Greenwood, Daryl Davies, Rhonda Shallcross	—N/a		1994; (silver)
1995	—N/a	Lynn Hewitt, Linda Carter-Watts, Ellen Weir, Lyn Greenwood	—N/a		1995; (silver)
1996	—N/a	Lynn Hewitt, Linda Carter-Watts, Ellen Weir, Lyn Greenwood, alternate: Christine Traquair	—N/a		1996; (silver)
1997	Women's event not held				
1998	—N/a	Lynn Hewitt, Ellen Weir, Sarah Herbert, Lyn Greenwood, alternate: Sandy Gagnon	—N/a		1998; (bronze)
1999	Women's event not held				
2000	Women's event not held				
2001	—N/a	Helen Wright, Lynn Hewitt, Lyn Greenwood, Ellen Weir, alternate: Sandy Gagnon	—N/a		2001; (bronze)
2002	—N/a	Helen Wright, Lynn Hewitt, Lyn Greenwood, Ellen Weir, alternate: Sandy Gagnon	—N/a		2002; 4th
2003	—N/a	Helen Wright, Sandy Gagnon, Lyn Greenwood, Janet Cobden, alternate: Jenn Gagnon	—N/a		2003; 4th
2004	—N/a	Helen Wright, Lynn Hewitt, Sandy Gagnon, Janet Cobden	—N/a		2004; 5th
2005	—N/a	Helen Wright, Kim Forge, Sandy Gagnon, Lynette Gill, alternate: Cherie Curtis	—N/a		2005; 6th
2006	—N/a	Kim Forge, Sandy Gagnon, Lyn Gill, Laurie Weeden	—N/a		—
2007	—N/a	Kim Forge, Sandy Gagnon, Lynette Gill, Madeleine Kate Wilson	—N/a		2007; 4th
2008	—N/a	Kim Forge, Sandy Gagnon, Lynette Gill, Laurie Weeden, alternate: Madeleine Kate Wilson	—N/a		2008; 5th
2009	—N/a	Kim Forge, Laurie Weeden, Lynette Gill, Madeleine Kate Wilson	—N/a		2009; 5th
2010	—N/a	Kim Forge, Laurie Weeden, Lynette Gill, Madeleine Kate Wilson	—N/a		2010; 5th
2011	Women's event not held				
2012	—N/a	Laurie Weeden, Kim Forge, Lynette Gill, Blair Murray	—N/a		2012; 4th
2013	—N/a	Kim Forge, Sandy Gagnon, Anne Powell, Blair Murray	—N/a		2013; 5th
2014	—N/a	Kim Forge, Sandy Gagnon, Kate Mountenay, Jenny Riordan	—N/a		2014; 5th
2015	Women's event not held				
2016	—N/a	Jennifer Westhagen, Lauren Wagner, Kristen Tsourlenes, Stephanie Barr, alternate: Anne Powell	—N/a		2016; 5th
2017	Naseby; 8-11 June	Helen Williams, Kim Forge, Ashley Street, Michelle Fredericks-Armstrong	Jennifer Westhagen, Stephanie Barr, Katherine Hayes, Beata Lukasiak	Lauren Wagner, Kristen Tsourlenes, Anne Powell, Carlee Millikin	2017; 6th
2018	Naseby; 7-10 June	Tahli Gill, Laurie Weeden, Lyn Gill, Kirby Kill, alternate: Jayna Gill	Jennifer Westhagen, Beata Bowes, Katherine Hayes, Stephanie Barr	Lauren Wagner, Kristen Tsourlenes, Anne Powell, Carlee Millikin	2018; 6th
2019	Naseby; 14-19 Aug	Lauren Wagner, Anne Powell, Kristen Tsourlenes, Carlee Millikin	Tahli Gill, Laurie Weeden, Lyn Gill, Kirby Kill, alternate: Amanda Hlushak	Jennifer Westhagen, Beata Bowes, Katherine Hayes, Stephanie Barr	2019; 6th
2020	Australian Championship cancelled due to COVID-19 pandemic				
2021	Australian Championship cancelled due to COVID-19 pandemic				
2022	Naseby; 15-18 Aug	Jennifer Westhagen, Sara Westman, Kristin Tsourlenes, Carlee Millikin, alternate: Nicole Hewett	Tahli Gill, Kirby Gill, Su Yun Oh, Ivy Militano, alternate: Lucy Militano	Helen Williams, Karen Titheridge, Kim Irvine, Michelle Fredericks-Armstrong, alternate: Adrienne Kennedy	2022; 6th
2023	Naseby; 6-9 Jun	Jennifer Westhagen, Sara Westman, Kristin Tsourlenes, Carlee Millikin	Helen Williams, Kim Forge, Anne Powell, Beata Bowes	Karen Titheridge, Carolyn Swan, Jelena Sostaric, Delaney Hyde	2023; 8th
2024	Naseby; 13-16 May	Helen Williams, Sara Westman, Karen Titheridge, Kristin Tsourlenes, alternate: Michelle Fredericks-Armstrong	Anne Powell, Amanda Hlushak, Nicole Hewett, Fiona Foley	Ros Gallagher, Agnes Szentannai, Michelle Dunstone, Joanne Robins, alternate: Jennifer Westhagen	

(skips marked bold)

== See also ==
- Australian Men's Curling Championship
- Australian Mixed Curling Championship
- Australian Mixed Doubles Curling Championship
