= 2018 Australian Mixed Curling Championship =

- Host city: Naseby, New Zealand
- Arena: Naseby Curling Club
- Dates: June 7–10, 2018
- Winner: Team Panoussi
- Skip: Matt Panoussi
- Third: Jennifer Westhagen
- Second: Gerald Chick
- Lead: Stephanie Barr
- Finalist: Team Millikin (Hugh Millikin)

The 2018 Australian Mixed Curling Championship was held from June 7 to 10, 2018 at the Naseby Curling Club in Naseby, New Zealand. The winners of this championship will represent Australia at the 2018 World Mixed Curling Championship.

At the same time 2018 Australian Men's Curling Championship and 2018 Australian Women's Curling Championship were held at the Naseby Curling Club.

== Teams ==
The teams are listed as follows:

Team	Skip	Third	Second	Lead
Team Batten	Nicole Batten	Damien Brain	Roslyn Gallagher	Ben Lyons
Team Freshwater	Bruce Freshwater	Katherine Hayes	Ian Gagnon	Samantha Bertram
Team Hansen	Jim Hansen	Laurie Weeden	Ali Cameron	Lyn Gill
Team Millikin	Hugh Millikin	Kim Forge	Steve Johns	Helen Williams
Team Panoussi	Matt Panoussi	Jennifer Westhagen	Gerald Chick	Stephanie Barr
Team Williams	Sam Williams	Tahli Gill	Mitch Thomas	Kirby Gill

== Triple Knock-out ==
=== Stage 1 ===
Draw 1
Team Batten	3
Team Freshwater	15
Team Millikin
Team Panoussi
Team Williams	10
Team Hansen	7

Draw 2
Team Freshwater	3
Team Millikin	8
Team Panoussi	8
Team Williams	2

Draw 3 (winner to Final 1, loser to Semifinal)
Team Millikin	3
Team Panoussi	10

=== Stage 2 ===
Draw 4
Team Freshwater	9
Team Hansen	5
Team Batten	1
Team Williams	11

Draw 5
Team Freshwater	5
Team Batten	9
Team Williams	11
Team Hansen	4

Draw 6 (winner to Semifinal)
Team Batten	6
Team Williams	9

=== Stage 3 ===
Semifinals
Team Panoussi
Team Millikin	8
Team Williams	3

Final 1
Team Panoussi	6
Team Millikin	7

Final 2 (if Panoussi loss Final 1)
Team Millikin	5
Team Panoussi	9

== Final standings ==
Place	Skip	Games	Wins	Losses
1st place, gold medalist(s)	Matt Panoussi	4	3	1
2nd place, silver medalist(s)	Hugh Millikin	5	3	2
3rd place, bronze medalist(s)	Sam Williams	6	4	2
4	Nicole Batten	4	1	3
5	Bruce Freshwater	4	2	2
6	Jim Hansen	3	0	3

== See also ==
- 2018 Australian Men's Curling Championship
- 2018 Australian Women's Curling Championship
- 2018 Australian Mixed Doubles Curling Championship
- 2018 Australian Junior Curling Championship
- 2018 Australian Senior Curling Championship
