= 2018 Australian Men's Curling Championship =

- Host city: Naseby, New Zealand
- Arena: Naseby Curling Club
- Dates: 7–10 June 2018
- Winner: Team Hewitt
- Skip: Dean Hewitt
- Third: Jay Merchant
- Second: Rupert Jones
- Lead: Ian Palangio
- Alternate: Steve Johns
- Finalist: Team Armstrong (Dustin Armstrong)

The 2018 Australian Men's Curling Championship was held from 7 to 10 June 2018 at the Naseby Curling Club in Naseby, New Zealand. The winners of this championship will represent Australia at the 2018 Pacific-Asia Curling Championships.

At the same time 2018 Australian Women's Curling Championship and 2018 Australian Mixed Curling Championship were held at the Naseby Curling Club.

== Teams ==
The teams are listed as follows:

Team	Skip	Third	Second	Lead	Alternate	Locale
Team Armstrong	Dustin Armstrong	James Boyd	Keswick Pearson	Hal Jenkins		(Western Australia) Perth
Team Brown	Alastair Brown	Rhogan Aitken	Elliot Douglas	Ian Lund		(Western Australia) Perth
Team Buck	Wyatt Buck	Gregory Gendron	Brad Scott	Andrew Walkeer		(Western Australia) Perth
Team Davis	Geoff Davis	Tanner Davis	Matt Panoussi	Angus Young		(Victoria (state)) Melbourne
Team Gagnon	Ian Gagnon	Clive Webster	Bruce Freshwater	Pete Manasantivongs		(Victoria (state)) Melbourne
Team Hewitt	Dean Hewitt	Jay Merchant	Rupert Jones	Ian Palangio	Steve Johns	(New South Wales) Sydney
Team Lyons	Ben Lyons	Damien Brain	Kevan Young	Edwin Wan		(Victoria (state)) Melbourne
Team Millikin	Hugh Millikin	Sam Williams	Mitch Thomas	Matt Millikin		(New South Wales) Sydney
Team Thomas	Max Thomas	Phil Goschnick	Jim Hansen	Ali Cameron		(Queensland) Brisbane

== Triple Knock-out ==
=== Stage 1 ===
Draw 1
Team Hewitt	16
Team Thomas	2
Team Gagnon	2
Team Armstrong	9
Team Lyons	2
Team Brown	12
Team Buck	5
Team Davis	8

Draw 2
Team Hewitt	7
Team Armstrong	5
Team Brown	7
Team Millikin	8
Team Davis

Draw 3
Team Hewitt
Team Millikin	2
Team Davis	7

Draw 4 (winner to Final, loser to Semi)
Team Hewitt	7
Team Davis	3

=== Stage 2 ===
Draw 5
Team Lyons	3
Team Thomas	8
Team Gagnon

Draw 6
Team Thomas	4
Team Gagnon	6
Team Buck	6
Team Brown	4

Draw 7 (winner to Stage 3)
Team Gagnon	12
Team Buck	2

=== Stage 3 ===
Winner to Draw 8
Team Lyons	4
Team Thomas	10

Draw 8
Team Millikin
Team Brown	6
Team Thomas	5

Draw 9
Team Armstrong	11
Team Gagnon	2
Team Millikin	11
Team Brown	2

Draw 10 (winner to Semi)
Team Armstrong	10
Team Millikin	6

== Play-off ==
Semifinal
Team Hewitt
Team Davis	1
Team Armstrong	7

Final 1
Team Hewitt	10
Team Armstrong	2

Final 2 (if Hewitt loss Final 1)

== Final standings ==
Place	Skip	Games	Wins	Losses
1st place, gold medalist(s)	Dean Hewitt	4	4	0
2nd place, silver medalist(s)	Dustin Armstrong	6	4	2
3rd place, bronze medalist(s)	Geoff Davis	4	2	2
4	Hugh Millikin	4	2	2
5	Ian Gagnon	4	2	2
6	Alastair Brown	5	2	3
7	Max Thomas	5	2	3
8	Wyatt Buck	3	1	2
9	Ben Lyons	3	0	3

== See also ==
- 2018 Australian Women's Curling Championship
- 2018 Australian Mixed Curling Championship
- 2018 Australian Mixed Doubles Curling Championship
- 2018 Australian Junior Curling Championship
- 2018 Australian Senior Curling Championship
