= 2010 Australian Men's Curling Championship =

- Host city: Naseby, New Zealand
- Arena: Naseby Curling Club
- Dates: June 2010
- Winner: Team Millikin
- Skip: Hugh Millikin
- Fourth: Ian Palangio
- Second: Steve Johns
- Lead: Don Glendinning
- Finalist: Team Chick (Gerald Chick)

The 2010 Australian Men's Curling Championship was held in June 2010 at the Naseby Curling Club in Naseby, New Zealand. The winners of this championship will represent Australia at the 2010 Pacific Curling Championships.

== Teams ==
The teams are listed as follows:

Team	Skip	Third	Second	Lead	Alternate	Locale
Team Chick	Gerald Chick	Matt Panoussi	Paul Meissner	Vaughan Rosier		
Team McMahon	Tim McMahon	David Imlah	Angus Young	Phil Goschnick		
Team Millikin	Ian Palangio (fourth)	Hugh Millikin (skip)	Steve Johns	Don Glendinning		

== Final standings ==
Place	Skip	Games	Wins	Losses
1st place, gold medalist(s)	Hugh Millikin			
2nd place, silver medalist(s)	Gerald Chick			
3rd place, bronze medalist(s)	Tim McMahon			
