= 2015 Australian Mixed Doubles Curling Championships =

- Host city: Naseby, New Zealand
- Arena: Naseby Curling Club
- Dates: October 1–4, 2015
- Winner: Laurie Weeden & Ian Palangio
- Finalist: Kim Forge & Hugh Millikin

The 2015 Australian Mixed Doubles Curling Championships was held from October 1 to 4, 2015 at the Naseby Curling Club in Naseby, New Zealand. The winners of this championship were represent Australia at the 2016 World Mixed Doubles Curling Championship.

At the same time 2015 Junior, Mixed Doubles, and Senior Australian National Championships were held at the Naseby Curling Club.

== Event format ==
Four teams fought it out in a double round robin best of five games format with wins and losses counting from the round robin.

The stylish wonder team made up of juniors Dean Hewitt and Kristen Tsourlenes were on fire in their first couple of games scoring wins from more experienced teams demonstrating the future talent of Australia.

At the end of the double round robin, teams were ranked from 1 to 4. Ian Palangio and Laurie Weeden ranked first with a record of 5 wins and 1 loss qualifying them for the Sunday morning gold medal game. Teams Hugh Millikin/Kim Forge and Dean Hewitt/Kristen Tsourlenes tied for second and were forced into a tie breaker game late on Saturday night to determine the final ranking for second and third place.

This competition marked the first opportunity for three new rules to be implemented at a Mixed Doubles nationals for Australia. The new rules included:

1. the Power Plan option mentioned above,
2. a change in the placement of the rock in the house from the back of the button to now be at the back of the 4 foot ring, and
3. no requirement for somebody to hold a broom, allowing teams to have the option for a sweeper with shots delivered.

General comments from players indicate they like the new rules as it makes the game more interesting to play, more scenarios, and greater mix of shots during the game.

== Teams ==
The teams are listed as follows:

Team	Male	Female	Coach	Locale
Gagnon / Gagnon	Ian Gagnon	Sandy Gagnon		
Hewitt / Tsourlenes	Dean Hewitt	Kristen Tsourlenes		
Millikin / Forge	Hugh Millikin	Kim Forge		
Palangio / Weeden	Ian Palangio	Laurie Weeden		

== Round-robin standings ==
Key
Team to gold-medal match
Teams to tiebreakers

	Team	1	2	3	4	W	L	Place
1	Gagnon / Gagnon	*	: :		: :			4
2	Hewitt / Tsourlenes	: :	*	: :	: :			2
3	Millikin / Forge	: :	: :	*	: :			2
4	Palangio / Weeden	: :	: :	: :	*	5	1	1

=== Tiebreaker ===
Team	1	2	3	4	5	6	7	8	Final
Millikin / Forge									W
Hewitt / Tsourlenes									L

== Playoffs ==
=== Bronze-medal match ===
Team	1	2	3	4	5	6	7	8	Final
Hewitt / Tsourlenes									W
Gagnon / Gagnon									L

=== Gold-medal match ===
Team	1	2	3	4	5	6	7	8	Final
Palangio / Weeden									W
Millikin / Forge									L

== Final standings ==
Place	Team	Games	Wins	Losses
1st place, gold medalist(s)	Ian Palangio & Laurie Weeden	7	6	1
2nd place, silver medalist(s)	Hugh Millikin & Kim Forge			
3rd place, bronze medalist(s)	Dean Hewitt & Kristen Tsourlenes			
4	Ian Gagnon & Sandy Gagnon			
