= Jonathan Wade (curler) =

Australian curler

- Curler ♂

Team
- Curling club: Sydney Harbour CC, Sydney

Curling career
- Member Association: Australia
- World Championship: 1 (1997)

Jonathan Wade is an Australian curler.

== Teams and events ==
Season	Skip	Third	Second	Lead	Alternate	Events
1996–97	Hugh Millikin	Gerald Chick	Stephen Johns	Stephen Hewitt	Jonathan Wade	WCC 1997 (7th)
2000–01	Gerald Chick	Mark Wuschke	Jonathan Wade	Stephen Hewitt		AMCC 2001 (silver)
2001–02	Jonathan Wade	Mark Wuschke	Frederic Legrand	Frank Forster		AMCC 2002 (bronze)
