= Dean Hewitt =

Australian curler (born 1994)

- Curler
- Born: 9 November 1994 (age 32); Melbourne, Victoria, Australia

Team
- Curling club: Victorian Curling Association
- Skip: Hugh Millikin
- Fourth: Dean Hewitt
- Third: Tanner Davis
- Second: Steve Johns
- Alternate: Steve Hewitt
- Mixed doubles partner: Jessica Wytrychowski

Curling career
- Member Association: Australia
- World Mixed Doubles Championship: 10 (2017, 2018, 2019, 2021, 2022, 2023, 2024, 2025, 2026, 2027)
- Pacific-Asia Championship: 6 (2014, 2015, 2016, 2017, 2018, 2019)
- Pan Continental Championship: 3 (2022, 2023, 2024)
- Olympic: 1 (2022)
Medal record
Curling
Representing Australia
World Mixed Doubles Championship
Gold medal – first place	2026 Geneva
Bronze medal – third place	2025 Fredericton

Dean Hewitt (born 9 November 1994) is an Australian curler from Melbourne. Hewitt and his former teammate Tahli Gill made history in 2022 as the first ever Australian curling team (in any curling discipline) to qualify for the Winter Olympics. Hewitt and Gill are also the first Australian team to ever win a World Curling Championship title, winning the 2026 World Mixed Doubles Curling Championship.

== Career ==
Hewitt first played mixed doubles with his mother, Lynn Hewitt. Lynn and Dean together played as the Australian national mixed doubles curling team at the 2017 World Mixed Doubles Curling Championship and the 2018 World Mixed Doubles Curling Championship

At the 2019 World Mixed Doubles Championship, Hewitt and his new teammate Tahli Gill made it to the semifinals before being eliminated by Sweden's Anna Hasselborg and Oskar Eriksson. In the bronze medal match, they again lost to John Shuster and Cory Christensen from the United States. Their fourth-place finish was the best finish ever for an Australian team at any World Curling Championship to that point. Gill and Hewitt were qualified for the 2020 World Mixed Doubles Championship, but the event was cancelled due to the COVID-19 pandemic.

At the 2021 Olympic Curling Qualification Event in December 2021, Gill and Hewitt made history when they won qualification to the mixed doubles tournament at the 2022 Winter Olympics. They are the first ever Australian curling team (in any curling discipline) to qualify for the Winter Olympics. At the Olympics, they finished with a 2–7 record, finishing in 10th place.

Gill and Hewitt would continue to find success in mixed doubles in the next Olympic quadrennial from 2022–26, performing well on the mixed doubles curling tour and consistently being ranked as one of the top 5 teams in the world. They would also notably win a bronze medal at the 2025 World Mixed Doubles Curling Championship. This success would allow them to compete in the 2025 Olympic Qualification Event in the hopes of representing Australia at the 2026 Winter Olympics. Gill and Hewitt would finish round robin play with a 6–1 record, qualifying for the playoffs, but would lose to South Korea's Kim Seon-yeong and Jeong Yeong-seok 10–5 in the final qualification game, failing to reach the Olympics. However, Gill and Hewitt would bounce back at the 2026 World Mixed Doubles Curling Championship, where they would finish 8–1 after the round robin and after beating Italy in the semifinals, would go on to defeat Sweden's Therese Westman and Robin Ahlberg 8–4 in the gold medal game to win their first world championship, as well as the first world championship title in curling ever for Australia.

== Personal life ==
Dean Hewitt began curling when he was 6 years old. Hewitt is from a curling family, as his mother and former mixed doubles partner, Canadian-born Lynn Hewitt, played curling in Canada from her childhood. When she met Australian farmer Stephen (Steve) Hewitt, she married him and they moved to Australia, and her husband began curling too. Steve was member of the Australian national men's team and played in several Pacific Curling Championships.

Hewitt studied a Bachelor of Exercise and Sport Science and a Master of Clinical Exercise Physiology at Deakin University. Outside of curling, Hewitt is a trained exercise physiologist, and works at an ice rink and a supermarket.

== Teams and events ==
=== Men's ===
Season	Skip	Third	Second	Lead	Alternate	Coach	Events
2011–12	Angus Young	Dean Hewitt	Maxwell Thomas	Sam Williams	Grant Hamsey	Tim McMahon	AMCC 2011 (bronze); PAJCC 2012 (5th)
2012–13	Maxwell Thomas	Dean Hewitt	Sam Williams	Grant Hamsey	Mitchell Thomas	Matt Panoussi	PAJCC 2013 (5th)
2013–14	Maxwell Thomas	Dean Hewitt	Mitchell Thomas	Grant Hamsey		Matt Panoussi	AMCC 2013 (4th); PAJCC 2014 (5th)
2014–15	Dean Hewitt	Maxwell Thomas	Mitchell Thomas	Grant Hamsey	Tyler Hogan	Matt Panoussi	PAJCC 2015 (5th)
2014–15	Ian Palangio	Jay Merchant	Dean Hewitt	Steve Johns		Archie Merchant	AMCC 2014 (gold); PACC 2014 (4th)
2015–16	Ian Palangio	Jay Merchant	Dean Hewitt	Derek Smith		Archie Merchant	PACC 2015 (5th)
2016–17	Ian Palangio	Jay Merchant	Dean Hewitt	Derek Smith		Archie Merchant	AMCC 2016 (gold); PACC 2016 (7th)
2017–18	Dean Hewitt (Fourth)	Ian Palangio	Christopher Ordog	Hugh Millikin (Skip)	Jay Merchant	Archie Merchant	AMCC 2017 (gold); PACC 2017 (4th)
2018–19	Dean Hewitt	Jay Merchant	Rupert Jones	Ian Palangio	Steve Johns		AMCC 2018 (gold)
2018–19	Dean Hewitt (Fourth)	Jay Merchant (Skip)	Dustin Armstrong	Steve Johns		Bob Armstrong	PACC 2018 (7th)
2019–20	Dean Hewitt (Fourth)	Sean Hall (Skip)	Tanner Davis	Jay Merchant	Matthew Millikin	Archie Merchant	AMCC 2019 (gold); PACC 2019 (6th)
2022–23	Dean Hewitt (Fourth)	Jay Merchant (Skip)	Tanner Davis	Justin Grundy	Iain Grundy	Chad Merchant, Archie Merchant	AMCC 2022 (gold); PCCC 2022 (7th)
2023–24	Dean Hewitt (Fourth)	Jay Merchant (Skip)	Tanner Davis	Justin Grundy	Thomas Bence	Chad Merchant, Archie Merchant	AMCC 2023 (gold); PCCC 2023 (6th)
2024–25	Dean Hewitt (Fourth)	Steve Johns	Stephen Hewitt	Hugh Millikin (Skip)			AMCC 2024 (gold)
2024–25	Dean Hewitt (Fourth)	Tanner Davis	Steve Johns	Hugh Millikin (Skip)	Steve Hewitt	Perry Marshall	PCCC 2024

=== Mixed doubles ===
Season	Female	Male	Coach	Events
2014–15	Kristen Tsourlenes	Dean Hewitt		AMDCC 2014 (bronze)
2015–16	Kristen Tsourlenes	Dean Hewitt		AMDCC 2015 (bronze)
2016–17	Lynn Hewitt	Dean Hewitt	Jay Merchant	AMDCC 2016 (gold); WMDCC 2017 (18th)
2017–18	Lynn Hewitt	Dean Hewitt	Pete Manasantivongs	AMDCC 2017 (gold); WMDCC 2018 (18th)
2018–19	Tahli Gill	Dean Hewitt	Pete Manasantivongs	AMDCC 2018 (gold); WMDCC 2019 (4th)
2019–20	Tahli Gill	Dean Hewitt		AMDCC 2019 (gold)
2020–21	Tahli Gill	Dean Hewitt	Pete Manasantivongs	WMDCC 2021 (13th)
2021–22	Tahli Gill	Dean Hewitt	John Morris (OQE), Pete Manasantivongs	OQE 2021 (gold); WOG 2022 (10th); WMDCC 2022 (11th)
2022–23	Tahli Gill	Dean Hewitt	Laura Walker	AMDCC 2022 (gold); WMDCC 2023 (8th)
2023–24	Tahli Gill	Dean Hewitt	Perry Marshall	AMDCC 2023 (gold); WMDCC 2024 (15th)
2024–25	Tahli Gill	Dean Hewitt	Perry Marshall	WMDCC 2025 (bronze)
2025–26	Tahli Gill	Dean Hewitt	Perry Marshall	OQE 2025 (bronze); WMDCC 2026 (gold)
2026–27	Jessica Wytrychowski	Dean Hewitt	Perry Marshall	
