= 2018 Australian Women's Curling Championship =

- Host city: Naseby, New Zealand
- Arena: Naseby Curling Club
- Dates: 7–10 June 2018
- Winner: Team Gill
- Skip: Tahli Gill
- Third: Laurie Weeden
- Second: Lyn Gill
- Lead: Kirby Gill
- Alternate: Jayna Gill
- Finalist: Team Westhagen (Jennifer Westhagen)

The 2018 Australian Women's Curling Championship was held from 7 to 10 June 2018 at the Naseby Curling Club in Naseby, New Zealand. The winners of this championship will represent Australia at the 2018 Pacific-Asia Curling Championships.

At the same time 2018 Australian Men's Curling Championship and 2018 Australian Mixed Curling Championship were held at the Naseby Curling Club.

== Teams ==
The teams are listed as follows:

Team	Skip	Third	Second	Lead	Alternate	Locale
Team Debden	Bianca Debden	Krista Heath	Brianna Wood	Jillian Burkett	Samantha Bertram	(Victoria (state)) Melbourne
Team Gill	Tahli Gill	Laurie Weeden	Lyn Gill	Kirby Gill	Jayna Gill	(Queensland) Brisbane
Team Wagner	Lauren Wagner	Kristen Tsourlenes	Anne Powell	Carlee Millikin		(Victoria (state)) Melbourne
Team Westhagen	Jennifer Westhagen	Stephanie Barr	Roslyn Gallagher	Beata Bowles	Kate Hayes	(Victoria (state)) Melbourne

== Triple Knock-out ==
=== Stage 1 ===
Draw 1
Team Westhagen	16
Team Debden	2
Team Wagner	6
Team Gill	11

Draw 2 (winner to Final 1)
Team Westhagen	5
Team Gill	6

=== Stage 2 ===
Draw 3
Team Wagner	7
Team Debden	3
Team Westhagen

Draw 4
Team Debden	6
Team Westhagen	7

Draw 5 (winner to Final 1)
Team Wagner	7
Team Westhagen	8

=== Stage 3 ===
Final 1
Team Gill	7
Team Westhagen	5

Final 2 (if Gill loss Final 1)

== Final standings ==
Place	Skip	Games	Wins	Losses
1st place, gold medalist(s)	Tahli Gill	3	3	0
2nd place, silver medalist(s)	Jennifer Westhagen	5	3	2
3rd place, bronze medalist(s)	Lauren Wagner	3	1	2
4	Bianca Debden	3	0	3

== See also ==
- 2018 Australian Men's Curling Championship
- 2018 Australian Mixed Curling Championship
- 2018 Australian Mixed Doubles Curling Championship
- 2018 Australian Junior Curling Championship
- 2018 Australian Senior Curling Championship
