= Australian Curling Federation =

Sports governing body

- Sport: Curling
- Jurisdiction: National
- Affiliation: World Curling Federation
- Headquarters: Australia
- President: Kim Forge

Official website
- www.curling.org.au
- (Australia)

Australian Curling Federation is the governing body for the sport of curling in Australia.

== Presidents ==
- Hugh Millikin (... – 2015)
- Kim Forge (2015 – )

== ACF Officers ==
(as of January, 2014)

President	Hugh Millikin
Vice President	Kim Forge
Victorian Curling Association Representative	Matt Panoussi
NSW Curling Association Representative	Ian Palangio
Queensland Curling Association Representative	Dave Thomas
Treasurer	Laurie Weeden

== Structure ==
The national body has eight state member associations:

== Championship events ==
- Australian Men's Curling Championship
- Australian Women's Curling Championship
- Australian Mixed Curling Championship
- Australian Mixed Doubles Curling Championships
- Australian Junior Curling Championships
- Australian Senior Curling Championships
- Australian Wheelchair Curling Championship
