= Helen Williams (curler) =

Scottish-Australian curler (born 1973)

- Curler
- Born: 6 March 1973 (age 53); Dumfries, Scotland

Team
- Curling club: Victorian Curling Association
- Skip: Helen Williams
- Third: Sara Westman
- Second: Karen Titheridge
- Lead: Kristin Tsourlenes
- Alternate: Michelle Fredericks-Armstrong

Curling career
- Member Association: Australia
- World Championship: 1 (2026)
- World Mixed Championship: 2 (2016, 2017)
- Pacific-Asia Championship: 6 (2001, 2002, 2003, 2004, 2015, 2017)
- Pan Continental Championship: 2 (2023, 2025)
Medal record
Women's curling
Representing Australia
Pacific Championships
Bronze medal – third place	2001 Jeonju

Helen Williams (née Helen Wright, born 6 March 1973 in Dumfries, Scotland) is an Australian female curler originally from Scotland. Williams notably was the skip of the first ever Australian team at a World Women's Curling Championship in 2026.

== Biography ==
She is a farmer's daughter from Scotland, from a curling family. She was runner-up in the Scottish Junior Championships, and then played with Olympic gold medallist Rhona Martin’s team for a while. In 1997, when she was part of the Scottish and Britain national training squad and they were looking ahead to the Olympic Winter Games Nagano 1998, she injured her right ankle and she had a year away from competitive curling. She moved to Australia, to Perth and did not comes back to Scotland.

Williams would continue to curl in Australia, most notably winning a bronze medal at the 2001 Pacific Curling Championships. After taking a break from competitive women's curling, Williams would return and win her next Australian women's championship in 2024, representing Australia at the 2024 Pan Continental B-Division, where they would win the event, promoting Australia to the A-Division for 2025. Williams would then win her second straight national championship the 2025, giving her team the opportunity to represent Australia, with the goal of qualifying for the 2026 Winter Olympics. The team would finish in third place at the 2025 Pre-Olympic Qualification Event, qualifying for the 2025 Olympic Qualification Event. At the official Olympic qualifying event, they would finish with a record of 1–6, missing the playoffs and not qualifying for the Olympics. However, Williams would also skip the Australian team at the 2025 Pan Continental Curling Championships, where they would finish the round robin with a 2–5 record and qualify for the 2026 World Women's Curling Championship, Australia's first ever appearance at the event. At the World Championships, Williams would skip Australia to also their first victory, a 7–6 extra-end victory over Norway's Torild Bjørnstad, they would finish in last place with an 1–11 record.

She is a resident of Nedlands, Western Australia.

== Personal life ==
Williams works as a paediatrician at the Perth Children's Hospital and as an associate professor at the University of Western Australia. She is married.

== Teams and events ==
=== Women's ===
Season	Skip	Third	Second	Lead	Alternate	Coach	Events
2001–02	Helen Wright	Lynn Hewitt	Lyn Greenwood	Ellen Weir	Sandy Gagnon		AWCC 2001 (gold); PCC 2001 (bronze)
2002–03	Helen Wright	Lynn Hewitt	Lyn Greenwood	Ellen Weir	Sandy Gagnon		AWCC 2002 (gold); PCC 2002 (4th)
2003–04	Helen Wright	Sandy Gagnon	Lyn Greenwood	Janet Cobden	Jenn Gagnon	Gerald Chick	AWCC 2003 (gold); PCC 2003 (4th)
2004–05	Helen Wright	Lynn Hewitt	Sandy Gagnon	Janet Cobden		Gail Munro	AWCC 2004 (gold); PCC 2004 (5th)
2005–06	Helen Wright	Kim Forge	Sandy Gagnon	Lyn Gill	Cherie Curtis		AWCC 2005 (gold); PCC 2005 (6th)
2017–18	Helen Williams	Kim Forge	Ashleigh Street	Michelle Fredericks-Armstrong	Anne Powell	Robert Armstrong	AWCC 2017 (gold); PACC 2017 (6th)
2022–23	Helen Williams	Karen Titheridge	Kim Irvine	Michelle Fredericks-Armstrong	Adrienne Kennedy		AWCC 2022 (bronze)
2023–24	Helen Williams	Kim Forge	Anne Powell	Beata Bowes			AWCC 2023 (silver)
2024–25	Helen Williams	Sara Westman	Karen Titheridge	Kristin Tsourlenes	Michelle Fredericks-Armstrong		AWCC 2024 (gold); PCCC B 2024 (gold)
2025–26	Helen Williams	Sara Westman	Kristin Tsourlenes	Karen Titheridge	Michelle Fredericks-Armstrong	Dustin Armstrong	AWCC 2025 (gold); PCCC 2025 (6th); Pre-OQE 2025 (bronze); OQE 2025 (7th); WWCC 2026 (13th)

=== Mixed ===
Season	Skip	Third	Second	Lead	Coach	Events
2016–17	Hugh Millikin	Kim Forge	Steve Johns	Helen Williams		WMxCC 2016 (22nd)
2017–18	Hugh Millikin	Kim Forge	Christopher Ordog	Helen Williams	James Ordog	WMxCC 2017 (26th)
2018–19	Hugh Millikin	Kim Forge	Steve Johns	Helen Williams		AMxCC 2018 (silver)
