= Jay Merchant =

Australian male curler & curling coach

- Curler
- Born: 16 May 1982 (age 44); Coronation, Alberta, Canada

Team
- Skip: Jay Merchant
- Fourth: Dean Hewitt
- Second: Tanner Davis
- Lead: Justin Grundy

Curling career
- World Mixed Doubles Championship: 1 (2013)
- Pacific-Asia Championship: 6 (2014, 2015, 2016, 2017, 2018, 2019)
- Pan Continental Championship: 2 (2022, 2023)
Medal record
Men's curling
Representing Australia

Jay Merchant (born 16 May 1982) is an Australian curler and curling coach originally from Canada.

== Personal life ==
Merchant was born and grew up in Coronation, Alberta, Canada. His father, Archie curled in national oilman's competitions and his mom and older brother curled as well.

After high school, Merchant attended the University of Lethbridge where he studied for a Bachelor of Arts in political science.

He was a member of then Member of Parliament Rick Casson's steering committee and curled out of the Lethbridge Curling Club. He played juniors in Alberta and made it to provincials a number of times. In 2003 he played for University of Lethbridge at the CIS/CCA Curling Championships; they were in the top five. Merchant continued to compete in men's and competed in provincials in Alberta, Saskatchewan and Quebec in various levels of the sport.

In the 2000s, he curled on the World Curling Tour, and was a member of the Guy Hemmings' team in 2008.

In 2007, the Australian Winter Olympic Committee asked him to migrate to Australia on a distinguished talent visa. In 2010 he moved to Australia to coach and play with the Australian National Team and pursue a law degree at Bond University, which he completed in 2012.

Merchant studied a master's degree in business law at Bond University. He also completed his Juris Doctor and postgraduate diploma in legal practice. Merchant currently is a sergeant of police and is also a barrister working predominantly in the Queensland Magistrates Courts.

== Teams and events ==
=== Men's ===
Season	Skip	Third	Second	Lead	Alternate	Coach	Events
2007–08	Guy Hemmings	Pierre Charette	Jay Merchant	Jamie Korab	Mark Homan		
2014–15	Ian Palangio	Jay Merchant	Dean Hewitt	Steve Johns		Archie Merchant	PACC 2014 (4th)
2015–16	Ian Palangio	Jay Merchant	Dean Hewitt	Derek Smith		Archie Merchant	PACC 2015 (5th)
2016–17	Ian Palangio	Jay Merchant	Dean Hewitt	Derek Smith		Archie Merchant	PACC 2016 (7th)
2017–18	Dean Hewitt (fourth)	Ian Palangio	Christopher Ordog	Hugh Millikin (skip)	Jay Merchant	Archie Merchant	PACC 2017 (4th)
2018–19	Dean Hewitt	Jay Merchant	Rupert Jones	Ian Palangio	Steve Johns		AMCC 2018 (gold)
2018–19	Dean Hewitt (fourth)	Jay Merchant (skip)	Dustin Armstrong	Steve Johns		Bob Armstrong	PACC 2018 (7th)
2019–20	Dean Hewitt (fourth)	Sean Hall (skip)	Tanner Davis	Jay Merchant	Matthew Millikin	Archie Merchant	PACC 2019 (6th)
2022–23	Dean Hewitt (fourth)	Jay Merchant (skip)	Tanner Davis	Justin Grundy	Iain Grundy	Chad Merchant, Archie Merchant	PCCC 2022 (7th)

=== Mixed doubles ===
Season	Male	Female	Coach	Events
2012–13	Jay Merchant	Lynette Gill	Archie Merchant	WMDCC 2013 (22nd)

== Record as a coach of national teams ==
Year	Tournament, event	National team	Place
2010	2010 Pacific Curling Championships	Australia (men)	3rd place, bronze medalist(s)
2011	2011 World Mixed Doubles Curling Championship	Australia (mixed doubles)	16
2017	2017 World Mixed Doubles Curling Championship	Australia (mixed doubles)	18
