= Laurie Weeden =

Australian curler

- Curler
- Born: Toronto, Ontario, Canada

Team
- Curling club: Queensland CC
- Skip: Tahli Gill
- Third: Laurie Weeden
- Second: Lynette Gill
- Lead: Kirby Gill
- Alternate: Jayna Gill

Curling career
- World Mixed Doubles Championship: 2 (2014, 2016)
- Pacific-Asia Championship: 5 (2008, 2009, 2010, 2012, 2018)
Medal record
Curling
Representing Australia

Laurie Weeden (born in Toronto, Ontario) is an Australian female curler originally from Canada.

She works for Australian Curling Federation as secretary.

== Teammates and events ==
=== Women's ===
Season	Skip	Third	Second	Lead	Alternate	Coach	Events
2008–09	Kim Forge	Sandy Gagnon	Lynette Gill	Laurie Weeden	Madeleine Wilson	Janice Mori, Jennifer Coker	PCC 2008 (5th)
2009–10	Kim Forge	Laurie Weeden	Lynette Gill	Madeleine Wilson			NZWG 2009 (5th); PCC 2009 (5th)
2010–11	Kim Forge	Laurie Weeden	Lynette Gill	Madeleine Wilson		Janice Mori	PCC 2010 (5th)
2012–13	Laurie Weeden (fourth)	Kim Forge (skip)	Lynette Gill	Blair Murray		Janice Mori	PACC 2012 (4th)
2018–19	Tahli Gill	Laurie Weeden	Lynette Gill	Kirby Gill	Jayna Gill	Ken Macdonald (PACC)	AWCC 2018 (gold); PACC 2018 (6th)

=== Mixed ===
Season	Skip	Third	Second	Lead	Events
2018–19	Laurie Weeden (Fourth)	Ali Cameron	Lynette Gill	Jim Hansen	AMxCC 2018 (6th)

=== Mixed doubles ===
Season	Female	Male	Coach	Events
2013–14	Laurie Weeden	Ian Palangio	Carlee Millikin	WMDCC 2014 (12th)
2014–15	Laurie Weeden	Ian Palangio		AMDCC 2014 (silver)
2015–16	Laurie Weeden	Ian Palangio		AMDCC 2015 (gold); WMDCC 2016 (31st)
