= 2022 Pan Continental Curling Championships =

Annual curling tournament

- Host city: Calgary, Alberta, Canada
- Arena: Markin MacPhail Centre, Canada Olympic Park
- Dates: October 31 – November 6
- Men's winner: Canada
- Curling club: St. John's CC, St. John's
- Skip: Brad Gushue
- Third: Mark Nichols
- Second: E. J. Harnden
- Lead: Geoff Walker
- Alternate: Nathan Young
- Coach: Jules Owchar
- Finalist: South Korea (Jeong)
- Women's winner: Japan
- Curling club: Tokoro CC, Kitami
- Skip: Satsuki Fujisawa
- Third: Chinami Yoshida
- Second: Yumi Suzuki
- Lead: Yurika Yoshida
- Alternate: Kotomi Ishizaki
- Coach: J. D. Lind
- Finalist: South Korea (Ha)

The inaugural Pan Continental Curling Championships were held from October 31 to November 6 at the Markin MacPhail Centre at Canada Olympic Park in Calgary, Alberta. The event was used to qualify teams for the 2023 World Curling Championships. The event featured both an A Division and a B Division for both the men's and women's. This new championship combined the Pacific-Asia Curling Championships and the Americas Challenge into one event.

On the men's side, Canada, the host country of the 2023 Men's World Championship, and the top four men's teams (South Korea, the United States, Japan, New Zealand) qualified for the 2023 World Men's Curling Championship in Ottawa, Ontario, Canada. Brazil, the bottom finisher in the men's A Division, were relegated to the 2023 B Division while Guyana, the top finisher in the B Division, were promoted to the 2023 A Division.

The top five women's teams in the A Division (Japan, South Korea, Canada, the United States, New Zealand) qualified for the 2023 World Women's Curling Championship in Sandviken, Sweden. Since the women's A Division had one extra member as Australia could not attend the 2021 Pacific-Asia Curling Championships, the bottom two finishers in this year's women's A Division, Hong Kong and Brazil, were relegated to the 2023 B Division. Chinese Taipei, the top finisher in the B Division, were promoted to the 2023 A Division.

On October 5, the Chinese men's and women's team withdrew from this competition which caused the Kazakhstan men's team and the Chinese Taipei women's team to be promoted to A Division. On October 10, it was announced that an error was uncovered in the ranking system and it was determined that the Australia's men team and the New Zealand women's team should be promoted to A Division instead of the Kazakhstan men's team and the Chinese Taipei women's team.

== Medallists ==
A Division	Gold	Silver	Bronze
Men	Canada; Brad Gushue; Mark Nichols; E. J. Harnden; Geoff Walker; Nathan Young	South Korea; Jeong Byeong-jin; Lee Jeong-jae; Kim Min-woo; Kim Tae-hwan	United States; Korey Dropkin; Andrew Stopera; Mark Fenner; Tom Howell; Rich Ruohonen
Women	Japan; Satsuki Fujisawa; Chinami Yoshida; Yumi Suzuki; Yurika Yoshida; Kotomi Ishizaki	South Korea; Ha Seung-youn; Kim Hye-rin; Yang Tae-i; Kim Su-jin	Canada; Kerri Einarson; Val Sweeting; Shannon Birchard; Briane Harris; Rachelle Brown

== Men ==
=== A division ===
==== Teams ====
The teams are listed as follows:

Australia	Brazil	Canada	Chinese Taipei
Fourth: Dean Hewitt; Skip: Jay Merchant; Second: Tanner Davis; Lead: Justin Grundy; Alternate: Iain Grundy	Skip: Marcelo Mello; Third: Ricardo Losso; Second: Sérgio Vilela; Lead: Filipe Nunes; Alternate: Márcio Rodrigues	Skip: Brad Gushue; Third: Mark Nichols; Second: E. J. Harnden; Lead: Geoff Walker; Alternate: Nathan Young	Skip: Randolph Shen; Third: Nicholas Hsu; Second: Ken Hsu; Lead: Henry Cheng; Alternate: Yin Liu Luis
Japan	New Zealand	South Korea	United States
Skip: Riku Yanagisawa; Third: Tsuyoshi Yamaguchi; Second: Takeru Yamamoto; Lead: Satoshi Koizumi; Alternate: Yasumasa Tanida	Skip: Anton Hood; Third: Ben Smith; Second: Brett Sargon; Lead: Hunter Walker; Alternate: Peter de Boer	Skip: Jeong Byeong-jin; Third: Lee Jeong-jae; Second: Kim Min-woo; Lead: Kim Tae-hwan	Skip: Korey Dropkin; Third: Andrew Stopera; Second: Mark Fenner; Lead: Tom Howell; Alternate: Rich Ruohonen

==== Round-robin standings ====
Final round-robin standings

Key
Teams to Playoffs and qualified for the 2023 World Men's Curling Championship
Team Qualified for the 2023 World Men's Curling Championship
Team Relegated to 2023 B Division

Country	Skip	W	L	W–L	PF	PA	EW	EL	BE	SE	S%	DSC
Canada	Brad Gushue	6	1	1–1	69	29	34	19	0	13	87.9%	16.29
United States	Korey Dropkin	6	1	1–1	58	35	26	25	2	7	84.7%	18.33
South Korea	Jeong Byeong-jin	6	1	1–1	60	35	32	18	2	12	80.5%	27.03
Japan	Riku Yanagisawa	3	4	1–0	47	43	28	24	1	7	80.7%	30.33
New Zealand	Anton Hood	3	4	0–1	40	46	21	25	9	5	78.5%	49.05
Chinese Taipei	Randolph Shen	2	5	1–0	32	54	20	26	1	7	66.4%	65.49
Australia	Jay Merchant	2	5	0–1	37	50	23	27	8	4	71.9%	54.52
Brazil	Marcelo Mello	0	7	–	16	67	12	32	4	1	56.0%	70.69

Round Robin Summary Table
Pos.	Country	Australia	Brazil	Canada	Chinese Taipei	Japan	New Zealand	South Korea	United States	Record
7	Australia	—	10–2	5–11	4–9	6–5	5–6	4–9	3–8	2–5
8	Brazil	2–10	—	1–7	3–9	3–9	3–13	1–10	3–9	0–7
1	Canada	11–5	7–1	—	11–3	11–2	10–5	11–3	8–10	6–1
6	Chinese Taipei	9–4	9–3	3–11	—	1–10	3–6	5–11	2–9	2–5
4	Japan	5–6	9–3	2–11	10–1	—	9–5	5–7	7–10	3–4
5	New Zealand	6–5	13–3	5–10	6–3	5–9	—	3–10	2–6	3–4
3	South Korea	9–4	10–1	3–11	11–5	7–5	10–3	—	10–6	6–1
2	United States	8–3	9–3	10–8	9–2	10–7	6–2	6–10	—	6–1

==== Round-robin results ====
All draw times are listed in Mountain Time (UTC−06:00).

===== Draw 1 =====
Monday, October 31, 14:00

Sheet A	1	2	3	4	5	6	7	8	9	10	11	Final
Canada (Gushue)	1	0	0	2	0	1	0	2	0	2	0	8
United States (Dropkin) 🔨	0	0	2	0	1	0	4	0	1	0	2	10

Sheet B	1	2	3	4	5	6	7	8	9	10	Final
New Zealand (Hood)	0	2	0	0	3	0	0	0	0	1	6
Australia (Merchant) 🔨	2	0	0	3	0	0	0	0	0	0	5

Sheet C	1	2	3	4	5	6	7	8	9	10	Final
South Korea (Jeong)	0	1	1	0	1	0	1	0	0	3	7
Japan (Yanagisawa) 🔨	0	0	0	1	0	3	0	1	0	0	5

Sheet D	1	2	3	4	5	6	7	8	9	10	Final
Chinese Taipei (Shen)	0	0	2	2	3	2	0	X	X	X	9
Brazil (Mello) 🔨	0	2	0	0	0	0	1	X	X	X	3

===== Draw 2 =====
Tuesday, November 1, 14:00

Sheet A	1	2	3	4	5	6	7	8	9	10	Final
Australia (Merchant)	0	1	0	0	1	0	0	3	0	1	6
Japan (Yanagisawa) 🔨	1	0	1	0	0	1	0	0	2	0	5

Sheet B	1	2	3	4	5	6	7	8	9	10	Final
Canada (Gushue) 🔨	3	1	0	1	1	1	0	X	X	X	7
Brazil (Mello)	0	0	0	0	0	0	1	X	X	X	1

Sheet C	1	2	3	4	5	6	7	8	9	10	Final
United States (Dropkin) 🔨	4	1	0	2	2	0	X	X	X	X	9
Chinese Taipei (Shen)	0	0	1	0	0	1	X	X	X	X	2

Sheet D	1	2	3	4	5	6	7	8	9	10	Final
New Zealand (Hood)	0	0	0	2	0	0	1	0	0	X	3
South Korea (Jeong) 🔨	0	2	0	0	2	0	0	3	3	X	10

===== Draw 3 =====
Wednesday, November 2, 8:00

Sheet A	1	2	3	4	5	6	7	8	9	10	Final
United States (Dropkin)	0	0	0	2	0	0	4	0	0	X	6
South Korea (Jeong) 🔨	2	2	2	0	1	1	0	1	1	X	10

Sheet B	1	2	3	4	5	6	7	8	9	10	Final
Australia (Merchant)	0	0	1	0	0	1	2	0	0	X	4
Chinese Taipei (Shen) 🔨	2	1	0	1	1	0	0	3	1	X	9

Sheet C	1	2	3	4	5	6	7	8	9	10	Final
New Zealand (Hood) 🔨	4	0	0	3	1	1	4	X	X	X	13
Brazil (Mello)	0	1	2	0	0	0	0	X	X	X	3

Sheet D	1	2	3	4	5	6	7	8	9	10	Final
Canada (Gushue) 🔨	3	1	0	4	0	1	2	X	X	X	11
Japan (Yanagisawa)	0	0	1	0	1	0	0	X	X	X	2

===== Draw 4 =====
Wednesday, November 2, 16:00

Sheet A	1	2	3	4	5	6	7	8	9	10	Final
Chinese Taipei (Shen) 🔨	0	1	0	2	0	0	0	0	0	X	3
New Zealand (Hood)	0	0	3	0	0	0	0	2	1	X	6

Sheet B	1	2	3	4	5	6	7	8	9	10	Final
South Korea (Jeong)	0	0	2	0	0	1	X	X	X	X	3
Canada (Gushue) 🔨	4	1	0	5	1	0	X	X	X	X	11

Sheet C	1	2	3	4	5	6	7	8	9	10	Final
Japan (Yanagisawa) 🔨	2	0	0	2	0	1	0	0	2	X	7
United States (Dropkin)	0	0	2	0	5	0	2	1	0	X	10

Sheet D	1	2	3	4	5	6	7	8	9	10	Final
Brazil (Mello) 🔨	1	0	0	0	0	1	X	X	X	X	2
Australia (Merchant)	0	3	1	4	2	0	X	X	X	X	10

===== Draw 5 =====
Thursday, November 3, 9:00

Sheet A	1	2	3	4	5	6	7	8	9	10	Final
Japan (Yanagisawa) 🔨	2	0	2	0	2	2	1	X	X	X	9
Brazil (Mello)	0	1	0	2	0	0	0	X	X	X	3

Sheet B	1	2	3	4	5	6	7	8	9	10	Final
United States (Dropkin) 🔨	1	0	1	0	2	0	0	0	2	X	6
New Zealand (Hood)	0	0	0	1	0	0	0	1	0	X	2

Sheet C	1	2	3	4	5	6	7	8	9	10	Final
Canada (Gushue) 🔨	3	0	2	0	4	0	2	0	X	X	11
Australia (Merchant)	0	2	0	1	0	1	0	1	X	X	5

Sheet D	1	2	3	4	5	6	7	8	9	10	Final
South Korea (Jeong) 🔨	3	0	3	3	0	0	2	X	X	X	11
Chinese Taipei (Shen)	0	1	0	0	3	1	0	X	X	X	5

===== Draw 6 =====
Thursday, November 3, 19:00

Sheet A	1	2	3	4	5	6	7	8	9	10	Final
New Zealand (Hood)	0	0	3	0	0	1	0	1	0	X	5
Canada (Gushue) 🔨	1	1	0	2	1	0	2	0	3	X	10

Sheet B	1	2	3	4	5	6	7	8	9	10	Final
Chinese Taipei (Shen) 🔨	0	1	0	0	0	0	X	X	X	X	1
Japan (Yanagisawa)	1	0	2	2	2	3	X	X	X	X	10

Sheet C	1	2	3	4	5	6	7	8	9	10	Final
Brazil (Mello)	0	1	0	0	0	0	X	X	X	X	1
South Korea (Jeong) 🔨	2	0	1	1	1	5	X	X	X	X	10

Sheet D	1	2	3	4	5	6	7	8	9	10	Final
Australia (Merchant)	0	1	0	0	1	0	1	X	X	X	3
United States (Dropkin) 🔨	2	0	3	0	0	3	0	X	X	X	8

===== Draw 7 =====
Friday, November 4, 14:00

Sheet A	1	2	3	4	5	6	7	8	9	10	Final
South Korea (Jeong) 🔨	2	0	1	2	0	1	0	3	X	X	9
Australia (Merchant)	0	1	0	0	2	0	1	0	X	X	4

Sheet B	1	2	3	4	5	6	7	8	9	10	Final
Brazil (Mello) 🔨	0	0	2	0	0	0	0	1	X	X	3
United States (Dropkin)	1	3	0	4	0	1	0	0	X	X	9

Sheet C	1	2	3	4	5	6	7	8	9	10	Final
Chinese Taipei (Shen)	0	0	0	2	0	1	0	X	X	X	3
Canada (Gushue) 🔨	2	1	1	0	5	0	2	X	X	X	11

Sheet D	1	2	3	4	5	6	7	8	9	10	Final
Japan (Yanagisawa) 🔨	2	0	0	2	2	0	1	0	2	X	9
New Zealand (Hood)	0	0	1	0	0	2	0	2	0	X	5

==== Playoffs ====
Semifinals
1	Canada	8
4	Japan	2
2	United States	6
3	South Korea	9

Gold medal game
1	Canada	11
3	South Korea	3
Bronze medal game
4	Japan	7
2	United States	8

===== Semifinals =====
Saturday, November 5, 9:00

Sheet B	1	2	3	4	5	6	7	8	9	10	Final
Canada (Gushue) 🔨	2	3	0	0	0	0	2	1	X	X	8
Japan (Yanagisawa)	0	0	2	0	0	0	0	0	X	X	2

Player percentages
Canada		Japan	
Geoff Walker	89%	Satoshi Koizumi	91%
E. J. Harnden	83%	Yasumasa Tanida	77%
Mark Nichols	98%	Tsuyoshi Yamaguchi	94%
Brad Gushue	95%	Riku Yanagisawa	72%
Total	92%	Total	83%

Sheet D	1	2	3	4	5	6	7	8	9	10	Final
United States (Dropkin)	0	1	0	3	1	0	1	0	0	0	6
South Korea (Jeong) 🔨	1	0	3	0	0	3	0	1	0	1	9

Player percentages
United States		South Korea	
Tom Howell	99%	Kim Tae-hwan	90%
Mark Fenner	74%	Kim Min-woo	71%
Andrew Stopera	90%	Lee Jeong-jae	84%
Korey Dropkin	81%	Jeong Byeong-jin	84%
Total	86%	Total	82%

===== Bronze medal game =====
Saturday, November 5, 18:00

Sheet C	1	2	3	4	5	6	7	8	9	10	Final
Japan (Yanagisawa)	0	0	2	0	4	0	1	0	0	0	7
United States (Dropkin) 🔨	2	0	0	2	0	4	0	0	0	0	8

Player percentages
Japan		United States	
Satoshi Koizumi	91%	Tom Howell	98%
Yasumasa Tanida	85%	Mark Fenner	93%
Tsuyoshi Yamaguchi	91%	Andrew Stopera	84%
Riku Yanagisawa	73%	Korey Dropkin	81%
Total	85%	Total	89%

===== Gold medal game =====
Sunday, November 6, 9:00

Sheet C	1	2	3	4	5	6	7	8	9	10	Final
Canada (Gushue) 🔨	2	1	0	4	3	0	1	0	X	X	11
South Korea (Jeong)	0	0	1	0	0	1	0	1	X	X	3

Player percentages
Canada		South Korea	
Geoff Walker	97%	Kim Tae-hwan	89%
E. J. Harnden	95%	Kim Min-woo	73%
Mark Nichols	89%	Lee Jeong-jae	61%
Brad Gushue	81%	Jeong Byeong-jin	52%
Total	91%	Total	69%

==== Player percentages ====
Round Robin only

Leads	%
(Canada) Geoff Walker	91.5
(United States) Tom Howell	88.1
(South Korea) Kim Tae-hwan	87.3
(Japan) Satoshi Koizumi	86.0
(New Zealand) Hunter Walker	83.5

Seconds	%
(Canada) E. J. Harnden	87.5
(United States) Mark Fenner	83.5
(South Korea) Kim Min-woo	79.5
(New Zealand) Brett Sargon	75.4
(Japan) Takeru Yamamoto	75.3

Thirds	%
(Canada) Mark Nichols	87.3
(United States) Andrew Stopera	84.7
(South Korea) Lee Jeong-jae	82.0
(Japan) Tsuyoshi Yamaguchi	81.5
(New Zealand) Ben Smith	77.2

Skips	%
(Canada) Brad Gushue	85.9
(United States) Korey Dropkin	81.4
(New Zealand) Anton Hood	77.7
(Japan) Riku Yanagisawa	75.0
(South Korea) Jeong Byeong-jin	72.9

==== Final standings ====
Key
Teams Advance to the 2023 World Men's Curling Championship
Team Relegated to 2023 B Division

Place	Team
1st place, gold medalist(s)	Canada
2nd place, silver medalist(s)	South Korea
3rd place, bronze medalist(s)	United States
4	Japan
5	New Zealand
6	Chinese Taipei
7	Australia
8	Brazil

=== B division ===
==== Teams ====
The teams are listed as follows:

Guyana	Hong Kong	India	Kazakhstan
Skip: Rayad Husain; Third: Jason Perreira; Second: Baul Persaud; Lead: Khemraj Goberdhan	Skip: Jason Chang; Third: Justin Chen; Second: Martin Yan; Lead: Ching Nam Cheng	Skip: P. N. Raju; Third: Girithar Anthay Suthakaran; Second: Vinay Goenka; Lead: Kishan Dharmendra Vasant	Skip: Adil Zhumagozha; Third: Aidos Alliyar; Second: Dmitriy Garagul; Lead: Abragim Tastemir; Alternate: Arman Irjanov
Kenya	Nigeria	Qatar	Saudi Arabia
Skip: Oliver Echenje; Third: Haggai Ogak; Second: Simon Karanja; Lead: Victor Obiero; Alternate: Stanley Mukuba	Fourth: Tijani Cole; Skip: Harold Woods III; Second: Robert Brianne; Lead: Ben Harris-Eze	Skip: Abdulrahman Mohsen; Third: Salem Ali; Second: Mouaaz Mlis; Lead: Mohammed Al-Keldi	Skip: Alastair Fyfe; Third: Hussain Hagawi; Second: Mohammed Aldaraan; Lead: Munir Albeelbisi; Alternate: Suleiman Alaqel

==== Round-robin standings ====
Final round-robin standings

Key
Teams to Playoffs

Country	Skip	W	L	W–L	DSC
Hong Kong	Jason Chang	7	0	–	46.03
Kazakhstan	Adil Zhumagozha	5	2	1–1	68.11
India	P. N. Raju	5	2	1–1	72.51
Guyana	Rayad Husain	5	2	1–1	81.63
Qatar	Abdulrahman Mohsen	3	4	–	135.61
Saudi Arabia	Alastair Fyfe	2	5	–	106.54
Kenya	Oliver Echenje	1	6	–	149.18
Nigeria	Harold Woods III	0	7	–	109.98

Round Robin Summary Table
Pos.	Country	Guyana	Hong Kong	India	Kazakhstan	Kenya	Nigeria	Qatar	Saudi Arabia	Record
4	Guyana	—	5–8	6–5	3–11	15–1	14–3	11–3	15–3	5–2
1	Hong Kong	8–5	—	11–4	7–6	16–4	12–2	8–3	14–2	7–0
3	India	5–6	4–11	—	7–6	13–7	14–0	8–4	15–0	5–2
2	Kazakhstan	11–3	6–7	6–7	—	14–3	16–2	9–4	7–4	5–2
7	Kenya	1–15	4–16	7–13	3–14	—	11–10	5–15	8–10	1–6
8	Nigeria	3–14	2–12	0–14	2–16	10–11	—	6–12	6–7	0–7
5	Qatar	3–11	3–8	4–8	4–9	15–5	12–6	—	8–5	3–4
6	Saudi Arabia	3–15	2–14	0–15	4–7	10–8	7–6	5–8	—	2–5

==== Round-robin results ====
All draw times are listed in Mountain Time (UTC−06:00).

===== Draw 1 =====
Monday, October 31, 19:00

Sheet E	1	2	3	4	5	6	7	8	9	10	Final
Hong Kong (Chang) 🔨	0	1	0	1	2	1	1	0	2	X	8
Qatar (Mohsen)	1	0	1	0	0	0	0	1	0	X	3

Sheet F	1	2	3	4	5	6	7	8	9	10	Final
Guyana (Husain)	0	0	1	5	2	2	0	5	X	X	15
Saudi Arabia (Fyfe) 🔨	1	1	0	0	0	0	1	0	X	X	3

Sheet G	1	2	3	4	5	6	7	8	9	10	Final
India (Raju) 🔨	0	0	1	1	3	0	0	1	0	1	7
Kazakhstan (Zhumagozha)	0	2	0	0	0	0	3	0	1	0	6

Sheet H	1	2	3	4	5	6	7	8	9	10	11	Final
Kenya (Echenje)	2	0	1	0	5	0	0	0	2	0	1	11
Nigeria (Woods III) 🔨	0	1	0	2	0	2	3	1	0	1	0	10

===== Draw 2 =====
Tuesday, November 1, 9:00

Sheet E	1	2	3	4	5	6	7	8	9	10	Final
Kazakhstan (Zhumagozha) 🔨	3	1	0	5	0	3	2	X	X	X	14
Kenya (Echenje)	0	0	2	0	1	0	0	X	X	X	3

Sheet F	1	2	3	4	5	6	7	8	9	10	Final
India (Raju)	2	4	1	2	1	0	4	X	X	X	14
Nigeria (Woods III) 🔨	0	0	0	0	0	0	0	X	X	X	0

Sheet G	1	2	3	4	5	6	7	8	9	10	Final
Saudi Arabia (Fyfe) 🔨	0	0	1	0	0	1	X	X	X	X	2
Hong Kong (Chang)	4	4	0	3	3	0	X	X	X	X	14

Sheet H	1	2	3	4	5	6	7	8	9	10	Final
Guyana (Husain)	2	1	1	1	0	4	2	0	X	X	11
Qatar (Mohsen) 🔨	0	0	0	0	2	0	0	1	X	X	3

===== Draw 3 =====
Tuesday, November 1, 19:00

Sheet E	1	2	3	4	5	6	7	8	9	10	Final
Nigeria (Woods III)	1	0	1	0	1	0	0	3	0	0	6
Saudi Arabia (Fyfe) 🔨	0	1	0	1	0	2	1	0	1	1	7

Sheet F	1	2	3	4	5	6	7	8	9	10	Final
Kenya (Echenje) 🔨	0	0	0	0	0	0	1	0	0	X	1
Guyana (Husain)	0	2	2	2	2	4	0	2	1	X	15

Sheet G	1	2	3	4	5	6	7	8	9	10	Final
Qatar (Mohsen)	0	2	0	0	0	1	1	0	0	X	4
India (Raju) 🔨	1	0	1	2	2	0	0	0	2	X	8

Sheet H	1	2	3	4	5	6	7	8	9	10	Final
Hong Kong (Chang) 🔨	0	0	4	0	0	1	0	0	0	2	7
Kazakhstan (Zhumagozha)	1	0	0	0	1	0	2	1	1	0	6

===== Draw 4 =====
Wednesday, November 2, 14:00

Sheet E	1	2	3	4	5	6	7	8	9	10	Final
India (Raju)	0	0	0	1	0	1	0	2	0	X	4
Hong Kong (Chang) 🔨	1	4	2	0	1	0	1	0	2	X	11

Sheet F	1	2	3	4	5	6	7	8	9	10	Final
Kazakhstan (Zhumagozha) 🔨	2	0	2	0	1	0	1	1	2	X	9
Qatar (Mohsen)	0	1	0	2	0	1	0	0	0	X	4

Sheet G	1	2	3	4	5	6	7	8	9	10	Final
Guyana (Husain) 🔨	3	0	4	0	1	1	0	2	3	X	14
Nigeria (Woods III)	0	1	0	1	0	0	1	0	0	X	3

Sheet H	1	2	3	4	5	6	7	8	9	10	Final
Saudi Arabia (Fyfe) 🔨	0	2	0	3	0	3	0	1	0	1	10
Kenya (Echenje)	2	0	1	0	2	0	2	0	1	0	8

===== Draw 5 =====
Thursday, November 3, 09:00

Sheet E	1	2	3	4	5	6	7	8	9	10	Final
Qatar (Mohsen)	4	0	0	5	0	3	0	0	0	X	12
Nigeria (Woods III) 🔨	0	1	1	0	1	0	1	1	1	X	6

Sheet F	1	2	3	4	5	6	7	8	9	10	Final
Hong Kong (Chang) 🔨	4	0	2	3	0	2	0	5	X	X	16
Kenya (Echenje)	0	1	0	0	1	0	2	0	X	X	4

Sheet G	1	2	3	4	5	6	7	8	9	10	Final
Kazakhstan (Zhumagozha)	0	0	3	0	1	2	0	1	0	X	7
Saudi Arabia (Fyfe) 🔨	0	1	0	0	0	0	2	0	1	X	4

Sheet H	1	2	3	4	5	6	7	8	9	10	11	Final
India (Raju) 🔨	0	2	0	0	0	1	0	1	0	1	0	5
Guyana (Husain)	0	0	2	1	0	0	1	0	1	0	1	6

===== Draw 6 =====
Thursday, November 3, 19:00

Sheet E	1	2	3	4	5	6	7	8	9	10	Final
Guyana (Husain) 🔨	1	0	1	0	0	1	0	X	X	X	3
Kazakhstan (Zhumagozha)	0	1	0	2	4	0	4	X	X	X	11

Sheet F	1	2	3	4	5	6	7	8	9	10	Final
Saudi Arabia (Fyfe) 🔨	0	0	0	0	0	0	X	X	X	X	0
India (Raju)	1	3	1	2	3	5	X	X	X	X	15

Sheet G	1	2	3	4	5	6	7	8	9	10	Final
Kenya (Echenje)	0	0	1	0	2	1	0	1	0	X	5
Qatar (Mohsen) 🔨	4	4	0	1	0	0	3	0	3	X	15

Sheet H	1	2	3	4	5	6	7	8	9	10	Final
Nigeria (Woods III)	0	1	0	0	0	1	0	0	X	X	2
Hong Kong (Chang) 🔨	2	0	3	1	2	0	3	1	X	X	12

===== Draw 7 =====
Friday, November 4, 14:00

Sheet E	1	2	3	4	5	6	7	8	9	10	Final
Kenya (Echenje)	1	0	0	0	1	0	0	5	0	X	7
India (Raju) 🔨	0	2	2	1	0	4	1	0	3	X	13

Sheet F	1	2	3	4	5	6	7	8	9	10	Final
Nigeria (Woods III) 🔨	0	0	0	0	1	0	1	0	0	X	2
Kazakhstan (Zhumagozha)	1	1	2	3	0	1	0	4	4	X	16

Sheet G	1	2	3	4	5	6	7	8	9	10	Final
Hong Kong (Chang)	2	0	0	3	0	0	0	2	0	1	8
Guyana (Husain) 🔨	0	2	1	0	1	0	1	0	0	0	5

Sheet H	1	2	3	4	5	6	7	8	9	10	Final
Qatar (Mohsen)	0	0	0	1	0	2	2	1	2	X	8
Saudi Arabia (Fyfe) 🔨	0	1	2	0	2	0	0	0	0	X	5

==== Playoffs ====
Semifinals
1	Hong Kong	6
4	Guyana	7
2	Kazakhstan	3
3	India	9

Gold medal game
4	Guyana	8
3	India	5
Bronze medal game
1	Hong Kong	9
2	Kazakhstan	3

===== Semifinals =====
Saturday, November 5, 9:00

Sheet E	1	2	3	4	5	6	7	8	9	10	Final
Kazakhstan (Zhumagozha)	0	3	0	0	0	0	0	0	X	X	3
India (Raju) 🔨	1	0	0	1	3	2	1	1	X	X	9

Sheet G	1	2	3	4	5	6	7	8	9	10	Final
Hong Kong (Chang) 🔨	1	0	1	0	1	2	0	0	1	0	6
Guyana (Husain)	0	1	0	2	0	0	0	2	0	2	7

===== Bronze medal game =====
Saturday, November 5, 18:00

Sheet H	1	2	3	4	5	6	7	8	9	10	Final
Hong Kong (Chang) 🔨	1	1	2	1	0	0	1	0	3	X	9
Kazakhstan (Zhumagozha)	0	0	0	0	1	1	0	1	0	X	3

===== Gold medal game =====
Saturday, November 5, 18:00

Sheet F	1	2	3	4	5	6	7	8	9	10	Final
Guyana (Husain) 🔨	0	0	2	1	2	0	1	0	2	0	8
India (Raju)	1	0	0	0	0	1	0	2	0	1	5

==== Final standings ====
Key
Team Promoted to 2023 A Division

Place	Team
1st place, gold medalist(s)	Guyana
2nd place, silver medalist(s)	India
3rd place, bronze medalist(s)	Hong Kong
4	Kazakhstan
5	Qatar
6	Saudi Arabia
7	Kenya
8	Nigeria

== Women ==
=== A division ===
==== Teams ====
The teams are listed as follows:

Australia	Brazil	Canada
Skip: Jennifer Westhagen; Third: Sara Westman; Second: Kristen Tsourlenes; Lead: Carlee Millikin; Alternate: Nicole Hewett	Skip: Isis Oliveira; Third: Luciana Barrella; Second: Marcélia Melo; Lead: Sarah Lippi; Alternate: Giullia Rodriguez	Skip: Kerri Einarson; Third: Val Sweeting; Second: Shannon Birchard; Lead: Briane Harris; Alternate: Rachelle Brown
Hong Kong	Japan	Kazakhstan
Skip: Ling-Yue Hung; Third: Ada Shang; Second: Pianpian Hu; Lead: Yuen-Ting Wong	Skip: Satsuki Fujisawa; Third: Chinami Yoshida; Second: Yumi Suzuki; Lead: Yurika Yoshida; Alternate: Kotomi Ishizaki	Fourth: Yekaterina Kolykhalova; Skip: Angelina Ebauyer; Second: Tilsimay Alliyarova; Lead: Regina Ebauyer; Alternate: Merey Tastemir
New Zealand	South Korea	United States
Skip: Jessica Smith; Third: Holly Thompson; Second: Natalie Thurlow; Lead: Bridget Becker; Alternate: Ruby Kinney	Skip: Ha Seung-youn; Third: Kim Hye-rin; Second: Yang Tae-i; Lead: Kim Su-jin	Skip: Tabitha Peterson; Third: Cory Thiesse; Second: Becca Hamilton; Lead: Tara Peterson; Alternate: Vicky Persinger

==== Round-robin standings ====
Final round-robin standings

Key
Teams to Playoffs and qualified for the 2023 World Women's Curling Championship
Team Qualified for the 2023 World Women's Curling Championship
Teams Relegated to 2023 B Division

Country	Skip	W	L	W–L	PF	PA	EW	EL	BE	SE	S%	DSC
United States	Tabitha Peterson	7	1	1–0	70	30	36	22	1	17	82.5%	24.57
Canada	Kerri Einarson	7	1	0–1	74	28	39	21	4	17	82.8%	24.67
Japan	Satsuki Fujisawa	6	2	1–0	74	28	35	19	5	17	80.4%	22.59
South Korea	Ha Seung-youn	6	2	0–1	77	31	35	19	9	17	81.4%	33.41
New Zealand	Jessica Smith	4	4	–	51	61	28	31	1	8	70.1%	95.25
Australia	Jennifer Westhagen	3	5	–	42	73	27	40	0	8	64.1%	65.74
Kazakhstan	Angelina Ebauyer	2	6	–	35	74	21	37	1	7	60.7%	78.92
Hong Kong	Ling-Yue Hung	1	7	–	31	74	24	37	1	8	58.0%	102.93
Brazil	Isis Oliveira	0	8	–	29	84	20	39	3	3	59.1%	108.52

Round Robin Summary Table
Pos.	Country	Australia	Brazil	Canada	Hong Kong	Japan	Kazakhstan	New Zealand	South Korea	United States	Record
6	Australia	—	8–7	6–11	9–6	1–11	9–8	7–10	1–13	1–7	3–5
9	Brazil	7–8	—	2–10	2–8	2–11	7–13	4–10	1–13	4–11	0–8
2	Canada	11–6	10–2	—	8–1	9–3	12–1	11–3	7–4	6–8	7–1
8	Hong Kong	6–9	8–2	1–8	—	1–15	5–7	6–8	3–12	1–13	1–7
3	Japan	11–1	11–2	3–9	15–1	—	9–2	11–1	7–4	7–8	6–2
7	Kazakhstan	8–9	13–7	1–12	7–5	2–9	—	3–11	1–12	0–9	2–6
5	New Zealand	10–7	10–4	3–11	8–6	1–11	11–3	—	6–10	2–9	4–4
4	South Korea	13–1	13–1	4–7	12–3	4–7	12–1	10–6	—	9–5	6–2
1	United States	7–1	11–4	8–6	13–1	8–7	9–0	9–2	5–9	—	7–1

==== Round-robin results ====
All draw times are listed in Mountain Time (UTC−06:00).

===== Draw 1 =====
Monday, October 31, 9:00

Sheet A	1	2	3	4	5	6	7	8	9	10	Final
Australia (Westhagen) 🔨	1	1	0	2	0	0	2	0	0	2	8
Brazil (Oliveira)	0	0	2	0	1	2	0	1	1	0	7

Sheet B	1	2	3	4	5	6	7	8	9	10	11	Final
United States (Peterson)	0	0	0	3	0	0	4	0	0	0	1	8
Japan (Fujisawa) 🔨	0	0	1	0	1	1	0	1	2	1	0	7

Sheet C	1	2	3	4	5	6	7	8	9	10	Final
Canada (Einarson) 🔨	2	1	0	2	1	0	0	5	X	X	11
New Zealand (Smith)	0	0	2	0	0	1	0	0	X	X	3

Sheet D	1	2	3	4	5	6	7	8	9	10	Final
Kazakhstan (Ebauyer)	0	0	1	0	0	0	0	0	X	X	1
South Korea (Ha) 🔨	3	1	0	0	0	0	4	4	X	X	12

===== Draw 2 =====
Monday, October 31, 19:00

Sheet A	1	2	3	4	5	6	7	8	9	10	Final
Kazakhstan (Ebauyer)	1	0	1	0	0	1	0	0	X	X	3
New Zealand (Smith) 🔨	0	2	0	2	4	0	1	2	X	X	11

Sheet B	1	2	3	4	5	6	7	8	9	10	Final
Brazil (Oliveira)	0	0	0	0	0	1	X	X	X	X	1
South Korea (Ha) 🔨	4	3	3	2	1	0	X	X	X	X	13

Sheet C	1	2	3	4	5	6	7	8	9	10	Final
United States (Peterson) 🔨	2	1	1	0	1	1	1	X	X	X	7
Australia (Westhagen)	0	0	0	1	0	0	0	X	X	X	1

Sheet D	1	2	3	4	5	6	7	8	9	10	Final
Japan (Fujisawa) 🔨	4	1	1	3	0	3	3	X	X	X	15
Hong Kong (Hung)	0	0	0	0	1	0	0	X	X	X	1

===== Draw 3 =====
Tuesday, November 1, 9:00

Sheet A	1	2	3	4	5	6	7	8	9	10	Final
South Korea (Ha)	4	2	3	2	0	2	X	X	X	X	13
Australia (Westhagen) 🔨	0	0	0	0	1	0	X	X	X	X	1

Sheet B	1	2	3	4	5	6	7	8	9	10	Final
Japan (Fujisawa) 🔨	2	2	0	0	4	3	X	X	X	X	11
New Zealand (Smith)	0	0	1	0	0	0	X	X	X	X	1

Sheet C	1	2	3	4	5	6	7	8	9	10	Final
Hong Kong (Hung) 🔨	1	0	0	3	0	1	2	1	X	X	8
Brazil (Oliveira)	0	2	0	0	0	0	0	0	X	X	2

Sheet D	1	2	3	4	5	6	7	8	9	10	Final
Canada (Einarson) 🔨	2	3	3	2	2	0	X	X	X	X	12
Kazakhstan (Ebauyer)	0	0	0	0	0	1	X	X	X	X	1

===== Draw 4 =====
Tuesday, November 1, 19:00

Sheet A	1	2	3	4	5	6	7	8	9	10	Final
Canada (Einarson) 🔨	2	1	1	1	3	0	X	X	X	X	8
Hong Kong (Hung)	0	0	0	0	0	1	X	X	X	X	1

Sheet B	1	2	3	4	5	6	7	8	9	10	Final
Australia (Westhagen) 🔨	0	0	2	0	1	1	2	3	0	0	9
Kazakhstan (Ebauyer)	1	3	0	1	0	0	0	0	1	2	8

Sheet C	1	2	3	4	5	6	7	8	9	10	Final
Japan (Fujisawa) 🔨	0	0	5	0	0	2	0	0	0	X	7
South Korea (Ha)	0	1	0	1	1	0	1	0	0	X	4

Sheet D	1	2	3	4	5	6	7	8	9	10	Final
Brazil (Oliveira)	0	1	0	1	0	2	0	0	X	X	4
United States (Peterson) 🔨	3	0	3	0	2	0	2	1	X	X	11

===== Draw 5 =====
Wednesday, November 2, 12:00

Sheet A	1	2	3	4	5	6	7	8	9	10	Final
Brazil (Oliveira)	0	0	0	1	0	0	1	X	X	X	2
Japan (Fujisawa) 🔨	0	3	1	0	3	4	0	X	X	X	11

Sheet B	1	2	3	4	5	6	7	8	9	10	Final
Hong Kong (Hung)	0	0	0	0	0	0	1	X	X	X	1
United States (Peterson) 🔨	0	3	2	5	1	2	0	X	X	X	13

Sheet C	1	2	3	4	5	6	7	8	9	10	Final
Australia (Westhagen)	1	0	2	0	0	2	0	1	0	X	6
Canada (Einarson) 🔨	0	1	0	3	2	0	3	0	2	X	11

Sheet D	1	2	3	4	5	6	7	8	9	10	Final
South Korea (Ha) 🔨	0	0	2	0	5	0	2	1	0	X	10
New Zealand (Smith)	0	0	0	1	0	2	0	0	3	X	6

===== Draw 6 =====
Wednesday, November 2, 20:00

Sheet A	1	2	3	4	5	6	7	8	9	10	Final
United States (Peterson) 🔨	1	1	2	2	1	2	X	X	X	X	9
Kazakhstan (Ebauyer)	0	0	0	0	0	0	X	X	X	X	0

Sheet B	1	2	3	4	5	6	7	8	9	10	Final
Canada (Einarson) 🔨	3	0	1	0	1	3	0	2	X	X	10
Brazil (Oliveira)	0	1	0	0	0	0	1	0	X	X	2

Sheet C	1	2	3	4	5	6	7	8	9	10	Final
New Zealand (Smith)	0	1	0	1	0	0	0	2	1	3	8
Hong Kong (Hung) 🔨	2	0	1	0	1	1	1	0	0	0	6

Sheet D	1	2	3	4	5	6	7	8	9	10	Final
Australia (Westhagen)	0	0	0	0	0	1	X	X	X	X	1
Japan (Fujisawa) 🔨	2	3	2	1	3	0	X	X	X	X	11

===== Draw 7 =====
Thursday, November 3, 14:00

Sheet A	1	2	3	4	5	6	7	8	9	10	Final
Hong Kong (Hung)	0	1	0	0	1	0	1	0	X	X	3
South Korea (Ha) 🔨	1	0	3	4	0	3	0	1	X	X	12

Sheet B	1	2	3	4	5	6	7	8	9	10	Final
New Zealand (Smith)	0	3	0	2	0	2	0	1	2	X	10
Australia (Westhagen) 🔨	1	0	2	0	2	0	2	0	0	X	7

Sheet C	1	2	3	4	5	6	7	8	9	10	Final
Kazakhstan (Ebauyer)	0	0	1	0	0	1	X	X	X	X	2
Japan (Fujisawa) 🔨	1	2	0	4	2	0	X	X	X	X	9

Sheet D	1	2	3	4	5	6	7	8	9	10	Final
United States (Peterson)	0	2	0	2	0	2	0	0	1	1	8
Canada (Einarson) 🔨	2	0	1	0	2	0	0	1	0	0	6

===== Draw 8 =====
Friday, November 4, 9:00

Sheet A	1	2	3	4	5	6	7	8	9	10	Final
Japan (Fujisawa) 🔨	1	0	0	0	1	0	1	0	0	X	3
Canada (Einarson)	0	0	1	2	0	1	0	4	1	X	9

Sheet B	1	2	3	4	5	6	7	8	9	10	Final
Kazakhstan (Ebauyer)	0	0	0	0	1	0	2	1	3	X	7
Hong Kong (Hung) 🔨	1	1	0	2	0	1	0	0	0	X	5

Sheet C	1	2	3	4	5	6	7	8	9	10	Final
South Korea (Ha) 🔨	0	0	2	2	0	2	0	2	1	X	9
United States (Peterson)	0	0	0	0	1	0	4	0	0	X	5

Sheet D	1	2	3	4	5	6	7	8	9	10	Final
New Zealand (Smith)	0	0	2	2	0	0	1	1	4	X	10
Brazil (Oliveira) 🔨	3	0	0	0	0	1	0	0	0	X	4

===== Draw 9 =====
Friday, November 4, 19:00

Sheet A	1	2	3	4	5	6	7	8	9	10	Final
New Zealand (Smith)	0	0	0	1	0	1	X	X	X	X	2
United States (Peterson) 🔨	3	3	1	0	2	0	X	X	X	X	9

Sheet B	1	2	3	4	5	6	7	8	9	10	Final
South Korea (Ha)	1	0	0	2	0	0	0	1	0	0	4
Canada (Einarson) 🔨	0	3	1	0	1	1	0	0	0	1	7

Sheet C	1	2	3	4	5	6	7	8	9	10	Final
Brazil (Oliveira)	0	0	2	0	1	0	1	3	0	X	7
Kazakhstan (Ebauyer) 🔨	2	2	0	3	0	2	0	0	4	X	13

Sheet D	1	2	3	4	5	6	7	8	9	10	Final
Hong Kong (Hung) 🔨	0	1	0	3	1	0	0	0	1	0	6
Australia (Westhagen)	1	0	1	0	0	1	2	1	0	3	9

==== Playoffs ====
Semifinals
1	United States	4
4	South Korea	11
2	Canada	5
3	Japan	6

Gold medal game
4	South Korea	6
3	Japan	8
Bronze medal game
1	United States	5
2	Canada	7

===== Semifinals =====
Saturday, November 5, 13:00

Sheet B	1	2	3	4	5	6	7	8	9	10	Final
United States (Peterson) 🔨	0	0	0	2	0	2	0	0	X	X	4
South Korea (Ha)	1	0	3	0	1	0	2	4	X	X	11

Player percentages
United States		South Korea	
Tara Peterson	89%	Kim Su-jin	95%
Becca Hamilton	75%	Yang Tae-i	83%
Cory Thiesse	78%	Kim Hye-rin	91%
Tabitha Peterson	64%	Ha Seung-youn	88%
Total	77%	Total	89%

Sheet D	1	2	3	4	5	6	7	8	9	10	Final
Canada (Einarson) 🔨	0	1	1	0	1	0	1	1	0	0	5
Japan (Fujisawa)	0	0	0	1	0	1	0	0	3	1	6

Player percentages
Canada		Japan	
Briane Harris	93%	Yurika Yoshida	96%
Shannon Birchard	84%	Yumi Suzuki	73%
Val Sweeting	88%	Chinami Yoshida	93%
Kerri Einarson	75%	Satsuki Fujisawa	88%
Total	85%	Total	87%

===== Bronze medal game =====
Sunday, November 6, 13:00

Sheet C	1	2	3	4	5	6	7	8	9	10	Final
United States (Peterson) 🔨	1	0	1	0	0	2	0	1	0	X	5
Canada (Einarson)	0	2	0	2	0	0	2	0	1	X	7

Player percentages
United States		Canada	
Tara Peterson	84%	Briane Harris	90%
Becca Hamilton	75%	Shannon Birchard	90%
Cory Thiesse	76%	Val Sweeting	83%
Tabitha Peterson	70%	Kerri Einarson	88%
Total	76%	Total	88%

===== Gold medal game =====
Sunday, November 6, 18:00

Sheet C	1	2	3	4	5	6	7	8	9	10	11	Final
South Korea (Ha)	0	0	1	0	2	0	0	0	2	1	0	6
Japan (Fujisawa) 🔨	0	2	0	1	0	1	1	1	0	0	2	8

Player percentages
South Korea		Japan	
Kim Su-jin	76%	Yurika Yoshida	76%
Yang Tae-i	69%	Yumi Suzuki	73%
Kim Hye-rin	69%	Chinami Yoshida	78%
Ha Seung-youn	73%	Satsuki Fujisawa	74%
Total	72%	Total	75%

==== Player percentages ====
Round Robin only

Leads	%
(Canada) Briane Harris	87.1
(United States) Tara Peterson	87.1
(Japan) Yurika Yoshida	85.8
(South Korea) Kim Su-jin	82.8
(Australia) Carlee Millikin	77.6

Seconds	%
(Canada) Shannon Birchard	82.4
(South Korea) Yang Tae-i	79.7
(Japan) Yumi Suzuki	78.6
(United States) Becca Hamilton	78.5
(Kazakhstan) Tilsimay Alliyarova	68.3

Thirds	%
(United States) Cory Thiesse	84.8
(Canada) Val Sweeting	80.3
(South Korea) Kim Hye-rin	79.5
(Japan) Chinami Yoshida	79.4
(New Zealand) Holly Thompson	73.5

Skips	%
(South Korea) Ha Seung-youn	83.9
(United States) Tabitha Peterson	81.7
(Canada) Kerri Einarson	81.5
(Japan) Satsuki Fujisawa	77.6
(New Zealand) Jessica Smith	64.0

==== Final standings ====
Key
Teams Advance to the 2023 World Women's Curling Championship
Teams Relegated to 2023 B Division

Place	Team
1st place, gold medalist(s)	Japan
2nd place, silver medalist(s)	South Korea
3rd place, bronze medalist(s)	Canada
4	United States
5	New Zealand
6	Australia
7	Kazakhstan
8	Hong Kong
9	Brazil

=== B division ===
==== Teams ====
The teams are listed as follows:

Chinese Taipei	Kenya	Mexico	Nigeria
Skip: Heidi Lin; Third: Amanda Chou; Second: Stephanie Lee; Lead: I-Ling Liu; Alternate: Shar-Yin Huang	Skip: Purity Njuguna; Third: Rose Obilo; Second: Mercy Ngovi; Lead: Laventer Oguto; Alternate: Tinisga Wanjiru	Skip: Adriana Camarena; Third: Estefana Quintero; Second: Veronica Huerta; Lead: Karla Martínez; Alternate: Paulina Olivares	Skip: Anteequa Washington; Third: Njideka Harris-Eze; Second: Jane Eruchalu; Lead: Phina Brooks

==== Round-robin standings ====
Final round-robin standings

Key
Teams to Playoffs

Country	Skip	W	L	W–L	DSC
Chinese Taipei	Heidi Lin	6	0	–	72.69
Mexico	Adriana Camarena	4	2	–	114.75
Kenya	Purity Njuguna	2	4	–	168.41
Nigeria	Anteequa Washington	0	6	–	187.82

Round Robin Summary Table
Pos.	Country	Chinese Taipei		Kenya		Mexico		Nigeria		Record
Pos.	Country	1st	2nd	1st	2nd	1st	2nd	1st	2nd	Record
1	Chinese Taipei	—		12–3	8–2	9–6	8–5	20–0	12–1	6–0
3	Kenya	3–12	2–8	—		3–10	3–11	9–7	14–0	2–4
2	Mexico	6–9	5–8	10–3	11–3	—		13–1	17–1	4–2
4	Nigeria	0–20	1–12	7–9	0–14	1–13	1–17	—		0–6

==== Round-robin results ====
All draw times are listed in Mountain Time (UTC−06:00).

===== Draw 1 =====
Tuesday, November 1, 14:00

Sheet E	1	2	3	4	5	6	7	8	9	10	Final
Nigeria (Washington)	0	0	0	0	0	0	0	X	X	X	0
Chinese Taipei (Lin) 🔨	3	3	3	5	1	2	3	X	X	X	20

Sheet F	1	2	3	4	5	6	7	8	9	10	Final
Mexico (Camarena) 🔨	2	0	3	3	0	2	0	X	X	X	10
Kenya (Njuguna)	0	1	0	0	1	0	1	X	X	X	3

===== Draw 2 =====
Wednesday, November 2, 9:00

Sheet E	1	2	3	4	5	6	7	8	9	10	Final
Mexico (Camarena) 🔨	4	5	2	1	0	1	X	X	X	X	13
Nigeria (Washington)	0	0	0	0	1	0	X	X	X	X	1

Sheet F	1	2	3	4	5	6	7	8	9	10	Final
Kenya (Njuguna)	0	0	1	0	0	0	2	X	X	X	3
Chinese Taipei (Lin) 🔨	4	1	0	4	2	1	0	X	X	X	12

===== Draw 3 =====
Wednesday, November 2, 19:00

Sheet F	1	2	3	4	5	6	7	8	9	10	Final
Nigeria (Washington)	0	2	0	0	2	0	2	0	1	X	7
Kenya (Njuguna) 🔨	3	0	2	1	0	1	0	2	0	X	9

Sheet G	1	2	3	4	5	6	7	8	9	10	Final
Chinese Taipei (Lin) 🔨	1	0	0	1	1	3	0	0	3	X	9
Mexico (Camarena)	0	1	1	0	0	0	3	1	0	X	6

===== Draw 4 =====
Thursday, November 3, 14:00

Sheet E	1	2	3	4	5	6	7	8	9	10	Final
Kenya (Njuguna)	0	1	2	0	0	0	X	X	X	X	3
Mexico (Camarena) 🔨	4	0	0	4	2	1	X	X	X	X	11

Sheet F	1	2	3	4	5	6	7	8	9	10	Final
Chinese Taipei (Lin) 🔨	2	0	1	1	5	1	2	X	X	X	12
Nigeria (Washington)	0	1	0	0	0	0	0	X	X	X	1

===== Draw 5 =====
Friday, November 4, 9:00

Sheet E	1	2	3	4	5	6	7	8	9	10	Final
Chinese Taipei (Lin) 🔨	2	0	2	2	2	0	X	X	X	X	8
Kenya (Njuguna)	0	1	0	0	0	1	X	X	X	X	2

Sheet F	1	2	3	4	5	6	7	8	9	10	Final
Nigeria (Washington)	0	0	0	0	1	0	X	X	X	X	1
Mexico (Camarena) 🔨	2	6	3	3	0	3	X	X	X	X	17

===== Draw 6 =====
Friday, November 4, 19:00

Sheet F	1	2	3	4	5	6	7	8	9	10	Final
Mexico (Camarena)	0	2	0	1	0	0	1	1	0	0	5
Chinese Taipei (Lin) 🔨	1	0	3	0	1	0	0	0	2	1	8

Sheet G	1	2	3	4	5	6	7	8	9	10	Final
Kenya (Njuguna)	2	3	3	1	1	1	3	X	X	X	14
Nigeria (Washington) 🔨	0	0	0	0	0	0	0	X	X	X	0

==== Playoffs ====
Semifinal			Gold medal game
			1	Chinese Taipei	8
2	Mexico	13	2	Mexico	7
3	Kenya	1

===== Semifinal =====
Saturday, November 5, 9:00

Sheet F	1	2	3	4	5	6	7	8	9	10	Final
Mexico (Camarena) 🔨	1	3	2	1	1	0	4	1	X	X	13
Kenya (Njuguna)	0	0	0	0	0	1	0	0	X	X	1

===== Gold medal game =====
Saturday, November 5, 18:00

Sheet G	1	2	3	4	5	6	7	8	9	10	11	Final
Chinese Taipei (Lin) 🔨	1	0	0	1	0	1	0	3	0	1	1	8
Mexico (Camarena)	0	1	1	0	2	0	1	0	2	0	0	7

==== Final standings ====
Key
Team Promoted to 2023 A Division

Place	Team
1st place, gold medalist(s)	Chinese Taipei
2nd place, silver medalist(s)	Mexico
3rd place, bronze medalist(s)	Kenya
4	Nigeria
