= Dustin Armstrong =

Australian curler

- Curler

Team
- Curling club: Curling WA, Perth
- Skip: Dustin Armstrong
- Third: James Boyd
- Second: Keswick Pearson
- Lead: Hal Jenkins

Curling career
- Pacific-Asia Championship: 1 (2018)
Medal record
Men's curling
Representing Australia

Dustin Armstrong is an Australian curler. He is the only player from Western Australia in the line-up of the Australian men's team in the 2018 Pacific-Asia Curling Championships, the others originating Sydney or Melbourne.

== Teams and events ==
Season	Skip	Third	Second	Lead	Coach	Events
2018–19	Dustin Armstrong	James Boyd	Keswick Pearson	Hal Jenkins		AMCC 2018 (silver)
2018–19	Dean Hewitt (fourth)	Jay Merchant (skip)	Dustin Armstrong	Steve Johns	Bob Armstrong	PACC 2018 (7th)
