= Lynette Gill =

Australian curler

- Curler

Team
- Curling club: Queensland CC
- Skip: Tahli Gill
- Third: Laurie Weeden
- Second: Lynette Gill
- Lead: Kirby Gill
- Alternate: Jayna Gill

Curling career
- World Mixed Doubles Championship: 1 (2013)
- Pacific-Asia Championship: 7 (2005, 2007, 2008, 2009, 2010, 2012, 2018)
- Other appearances: World Senior Curling Championships: 1 (2024)
Medal record
Curling
Representing Australia

Lynette "Lyn" Kay Gill is an Australian female curler and curling coach.

== Teams and events ==
=== Women's ===
| Season | Skip | Third | Second | Lead | Alternate | Coach | Events |
|---|---|---|---|---|---|---|---|
| 2005–06 | Helen Wright | Kim Forge | Sandy Gagnon | Lyn Gill | Cherie Curtis | | PCC 2005 (6th) |
| 2007–08 | Kim Forge | Sandy Gagnon | Lynette Kate Gill | Madeleine Kate Wilson | Cherie Curtis | | PCC 2007 (4th) |
| 2008–09 | Kim Forge | Sandy Gagnon | Lyn Gill | Laurie Weeden | Madeleine Wilson | Janice Mori, Jennifer Coker | PCC 2008 (5th) |
| 2009–10 | Kim Forge | Laurie Weeden | Lyn Gill | Madeleine Wilson | | | NZWG 2009 (5th); PCC 2009 (5th) |
| 2010–11 | Kim Forge | Laurie Weeden | Lyn Gill | Madeleine Wilson | | Janice Mori | PCC 2010 (5th) |
| 2012–13 | Laurie Weeden (fourth) | Kim Forge (skip) | Lyn Gill | Blair Murray | | Janice Mori | PACC 2012 (4th) |
| 2018–19 | Tahli Gill | Laurie Weeden | Lynette Gill | Kirby Gill | Jayna Gill | Ken Macdonald (PACC) | AWCC 2018 (gold); PACC 2018 (6th) |

=== Mixed ===
| Season | Skip | Third | Second | Lead | Events |
|---|---|---|---|---|---|
| 2018–19 | Jim Hansen | Laurie Weeden | Ali Cameron | Lyn Gill | AMxCC 2018 (6th) |

=== Mixed doubles ===
| Season | Male | Female | Coach | Events |
|---|---|---|---|---|
| 2012–13 | Jay Merchant | Lynette Gill | Archie Merchant | WMDCC 2013 (22nd) |

== Record as a coach of national teams ==
| Year | Tournament, event | National team | Place |
|---|---|---|---|
| 2009 | 2009 Pacific Junior Curling Championships | Australia (junior women) | 5 |
| 2011 | 2011 Pacific Junior Curling Championships | Australia (junior women) | 5 |
| 2012 | 2012 Pacific-Asia Junior Curling Championships | Australia (junior women) | 5 |
| 2013 | 2013 Pacific-Asia Junior Curling Championships | Australia (junior women) | 5 |
| 2014 | 2014 Pacific-Asia Junior Curling Championships | Australia (junior women) | 5 |
| 2015 | 2015 Pacific-Asia Junior Curling Championships | Australia (junior women) | 5 |
| 2016 | 2016 World Junior B Curling Championships | Australia (junior women) | 18 |
| 2017 | 2017 World Junior B Curling Championships | Australia (junior women) | 21 |
| 2018 | 2018 World Junior B Curling Championships | Australia (junior women) | 20 |
| 2019 | 2019 World Junior-B Curling Championships (January) | Australia (junior women) | 16 |
| 2019 | 2019 World Junior-B Curling Championships (December) | Australia (junior women) | 16 |

== Private life ==
Lynette is from curling family: her three daughters Tahli Gill, Kirby Gill and Jayna Gill are curlers and teammates (and mum Lyn is their longtime coach). They all (with Lynette as a curler on second position) won 2018 Australian Women's Curling Championship and played as Australian national women's team on 2018 Pacific-Asia Curling Championships.
