= Matt Panoussi =

Australian curler and coach (born 1977)

- Curler
- Born: 7 May 1977 (age 49)

Team
- Curling club: Victorian Curling Association
- Skip: Matt Panoussi
- Fourth: Sean Hall
- Second: Derek Smith
- Lead: Sam Williams

Curling career
- Member Association: Australia
- World Mixed Championship: 3 (2018, 2023, 2024)
- Pacific-Asia Championship: 2 (2010, 2011)
- Pan Continental Championship: 1 (2025)
Medal record
Men's curling
Representing Australia
Pacific Championships
Bronze medal – third place	2010 Uiseong

Matthew "Matt" Panoussi (born 7 May 1977) is an Australian curler and curling coach.

He works for the Australian Curling Federation as a representative.

Outside of curling he works as a Test Leadership Consultant at UXC Professional Solutions Pty. Ltd.

== Teams and events ==
=== Men's ===
Season	Skip	Third	Second	Lead	Alternate	Coach	Events
2010–11	Gerald Chick	Matt Panoussi	Paul Meissner	Vaughan Rosier			AMCC 2010 (silver)
2010–11	Ian Palangio (Fourth)	Hugh Millikin (Skip)	John Theriault	Matt Panoussi	Vaughan Rosier	Jay Merchant	PCC 2010 (bronze)
2011–12	Hugh Millikin	Wyatt Buck	Matthew Panoussi	Vaughan Rosier		Gwyn Buck	PCC 2011 (4th)
2018–19	Geoff Davis	Tanner Davis	Matt Panoussi	Angus Young			AMCC 2018 (bronze)
2022–23	Hugh Millikin	Matt Panoussi	Sean Hall	Derek Smith			AMCC 2022 (silver) '
2023–24	Matt Panoussi	Gerald Chick	Derek Smith	Sam Williams			AMCC 2023 (silver)
2024–25	Sean Hall (Fourth)	Matt Panoussi (Skip)	Derek Smith	Sam Williams			AMCC 2024 (silver)

=== Mixed ===
Season	Skip	Third	Second	Lead	Coach	Events
2018–19	Matt Panoussi	Jennifer Westhagen	Gerald Chick	Stephanie Barr	Jamie Scholz (WMxCC)	AMxCC 2018 (gold); WMxCC 2018 (19th)

== Record as a coach of national teams ==
Year	Tournament, event	National team	Place
2013	2013 Pacific-Asia Junior Curling Championships	Australia (junior men)	5
2014	2014 Pacific-Asia Junior Curling Championships	Australia (junior men)	5
2015	2015 Pacific-Asia Junior Curling Championships	Australia (junior men)	5
2016	2016 World Junior B Curling Championships	Australia (junior men)	14
2016	2016 Pacific-Asia Curling Championships	Australia (women)	5
2017	2017 World Junior B Curling Championships	Australia (junior men)	18
2018	2018 World Junior B Curling Championships	Australia (junior men)	20
