= Tahli Gill =

Australian curler (born 1999)

- Curler
- Born: 8 September 1999 (age 27); Sydney, Australia

Team
- Skip: Tahli Gill
- Third: Kirby Gill
- Second: Oh Sun-yun
- Lead: Lucy Militano
- Alternate: Ivy Militano
- Mixed doubles partner: Dean Hewitt

Curling career
- Member Association: Australia
- World Mixed Doubles Championship: 7 (2019, 2021, 2022, 2023, 2024, 2025, 2026)
- Pacific-Asia Championship: 1 (2018)
- Olympic: 1 (2022)
Medal record
Curling
Representing Australia
World Mixed Doubles Championship
Gold medal – first place	2026 Geneva
Bronze medal – third place	2025 Fredericton

Tahli Gill (born 8 September 1999) is an Australian curler who resides in Brisbane. She currently skips her own team and plays mixed doubles with partner Dean Hewitt. Gill and Hewitt are also the first Australian team to ever win a World Curling Championship title, winning the 2026 World Mixed Doubles Curling Championship.

== Career ==
=== Women's ===
Gill started curling at age 11. Her mother Lynette is also a curler, as well as Tahli's sisters Kirby and Jayna. The four Gills sometimes play together, such as when they, along with Laurie Weeden, won the 2018 Australian Women's Championship. They then represented Australia at the 2018 Pacific-Asia Championship, where they finished in sixth place out of the seven teams.

=== Mixed doubles ===
At the 2019 World Mixed Doubles Championship, Gill and her teammate Dean Hewitt made it to the semifinals before being eliminated by Sweden's Anna Hasselborg and Oskar Eriksson. In the bronze medal match, they again lost to John Shuster and Cory Christensen from the United States. Their fourth-place finish was the best finish ever for an Australian team at any World Curling Championship to that point.

Gill decided to focus solely on mixed doubles for the 2019–20 season, placing second at the New Zealand Winter Games and winning the WCT Pacific Ocean Cup, a World Curling Tour (WCT) event. Gill and Hewitt were qualified for the 2020 World Mixed Doubles Championship, but the event was cancelled due to the COVID-19 pandemic.

At the 2021 Olympic Curling Qualification Event in December 2021, Gill and her teammate Dean Hewitt made history when they won qualification to the mixed doubles tournament at the 2022 Winter Olympics. They are the first ever Australian curling team (in any curling discipline) to qualify for the Winter Olympics. At the Olympics, they finished with a 2–7 record, finishing in 10th place.

Gill and Hewitt would continue to focus on mixed doubles for the next Olympic quadrennial from 2022–26, and would continue to perform well on the mixed doubles curling tour, consistently being ranked as one of the top 5 teams in the world. They would also notably win a bronze medal at the 2025 World Mixed Doubles Curling Championship. This success would allow them to compete in the 2025 Olympic Qualification Event in the hopes of representing Australia at the 2026 Winter Olympics. Gill and Hewitt would finish round robin play with a 6–1 record, qualifying for the playoffs, but would lose to South Korea's Kim Seon-yeong and Jeong Yeong-seok 10–5 in the final qualification game, failing to reach the Olympics. However, Gill and Hewitt would bounce back at the 2026 World Mixed Doubles Curling Championship, where they would finish 8–1 after the round robin and after beating Italy in the semifinals, would go on to defeat Sweden's Therese Westman and Robin Ahlberg 8–4 in the gold medal game to win their first world championship, as well as the first world championship title in curling ever for Australia.

== Personal life ==
Outside of curling, Gill worked in a gelateria and attended the Queensland University of Technology.

== Teams ==
=== Women's ===
Season	Skip	Third	Second	Lead	Alternate	Coach	Events
2011–12	Victoria Wilson	Marlene Corgat-Taylor	Shontelle Walker	Tahli Gill		Lynette Gill	2012 PAJCC (5th)
2012–13	Victoria Wilson	Marlene Corgat-Taylor	Kelsey Hamsey	Tahli Gill	Samantha Jeffs	Lynette Gill	2013 PAJCC (5th)
2013–14	Victoria Wilson	Samantha Jeffs	Tahli Gill	Kirby Gill	Ivy Militano	Lynette Gill	2014 PAJCC (5th)
2014–15	Victoria Wilson	Samantha Jeffs	Tahli Gill	Kirby Gill	Ivy Militano	Lynette Gill	2015 PAJCC (5th)
2015–16	Samantha Jeffs	Tahli Gill	Ivy Militano	Kirby Gill	Jayna Gill	Lynette Gill	2016 WJBCC (18th)
2016–17	Samantha Jeffs	Tahli Gill	Ivy Militano	Kirby Gill	Jayna Gill	Lynette Gill	2017 WJBCC (21st)
2017–18	Tahli Gill (fourth)	Samantha Jeffs (skip)	Ivy Militano	Kirby Gill	Jayna Gill	Lynette Gill	2018 WJBCC (20th)
2018–19	Tahli Gill	Laurie Weeden	Lynette Gill	Kirby Gill	Jayna Gill	Ken Macdonald (PACC)	AWCC 2018 (gold); PACC 2018 (6th)
2018–19	Tahli Gill	Ivy Militano	Jayna Gill	Kirby Gill		Lynette Gill	2019 (Jan) WJBCC (16th)
2019–20	Tahli Gill	Kirby Gill	Oh Sun-yun	Veronica Johns	Lucy Militano	Lynette Gill	2019 (Dec) WJBCC (16th)
2022–23	Tahli Gill	Kirby Gill	Oh Sun-yun	Lucy Militano	Ivy Militano		

=== Mixed doubles ===
Season	Female	Male	Coach	Events
2018–19	Tahli Gill	Dean Hewitt	Pete Manasantivongs	2019 WMDCC (4th)
2019–20	Tahli Gill	Dean Hewitt		
2020–21	Tahli Gill	Dean Hewitt	Pete Manasantivongs	2021 WMDCC (13th)
2021–22	Tahli Gill	Dean Hewitt	John Morris (OQE), Pete Manasantivongs	OQE 2021 (gold); WOG 2022 (10th); 2022 WMDCC (11th)
2022–23	Tahli Gill	Dean Hewitt	Laura Walker	2023 WMDCC (8th)
2023–24	Tahli Gill	Dean Hewitt	Perry Marshall	AMDCC 2023 (gold); 2024 WMDCC (15th)
2024–25	Tahli Gill	Dean Hewitt	Perry Marshall	2025 WMDCC (bronze)
2025–26	Tahli Gill	Dean Hewitt	Perry Marshall	OQE 2025 (bronze); 2026 WMDCC (gold)
