= Mitchell Thomas (curler) =

Australian curler

Mitch Thomas
- Curler
- Born: 4 May 1998 (age 28); Kogarah, Australia

Team
- Curling club: Queensland Curling Association; Brisbane, Australia
- Skip: Mitch Thomas
- Third: Jonathan Imlah
- Second: Jordan Ensinger
- Lead: Nicholas Hurford

Mitch Thomas (born 4 May 1998) is an Australian curler who has represented Australia in the 2013, 2014 and 2015 Pacific-Asia Junior Curling Championships as well as the 2016, 2017 and 2018 World Junior B Curling Championships.
