= Naseby, New Zealand =

Town in the South Island of New Zealand

Naseby
- Rural settlement
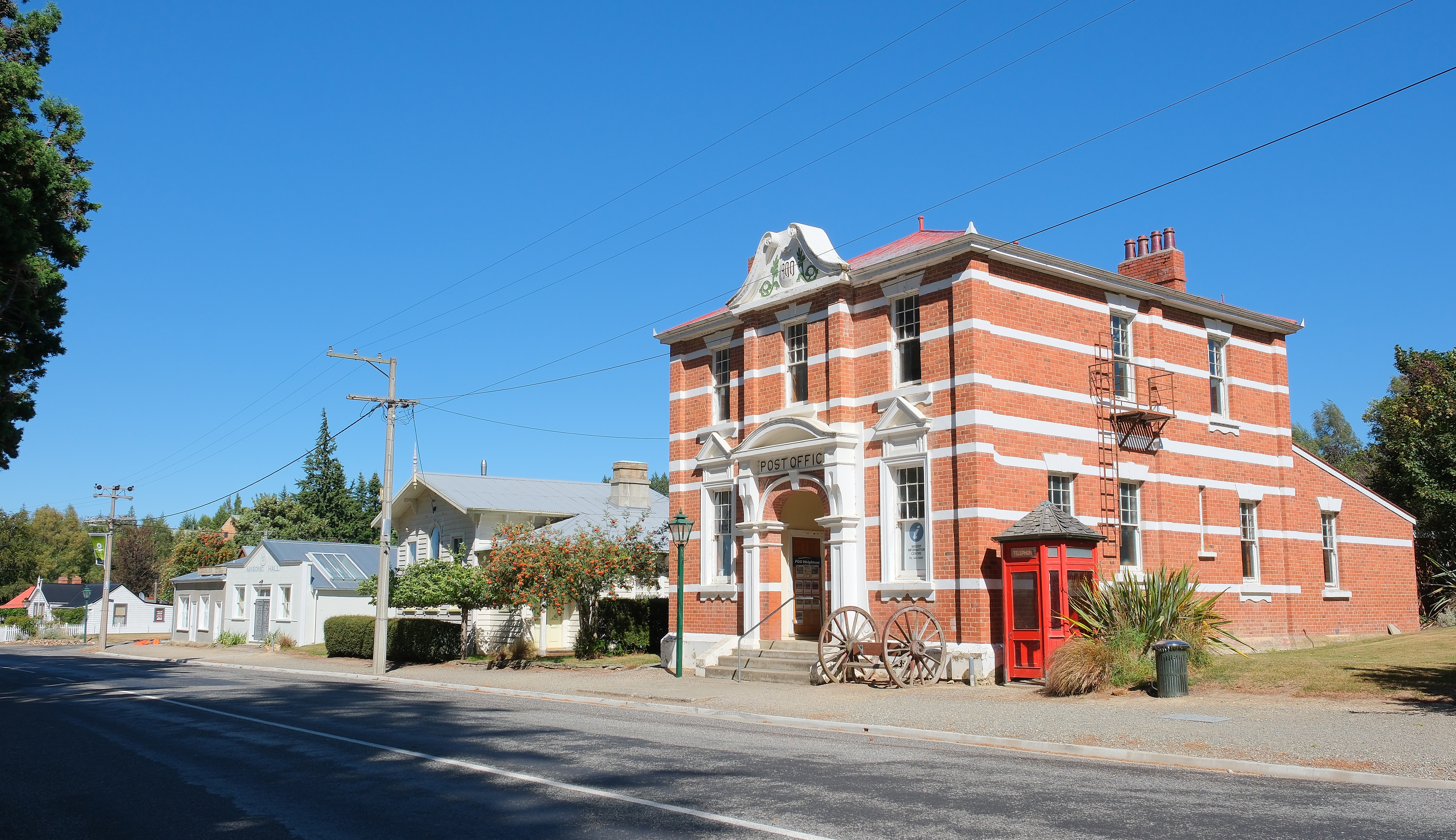
- The historic precinct of Naseby, New Zealand
- Interactive map of Naseby
- Coordinates: 45°1′S 170°8′E
- Country: New Zealand
- Region: Otago
- Territorial authority: Central Otago District
- Ward: Maniototo Ward
- Community: Maniototo Community
- Electorates: Waitaki; Te Tai Tonga (Māori)

Government
  - Territorial authority: Central Otago District Council
  - Regional council: Otago Regional Council
  - Mayor of Central Otago: Tamah Alley
  - Waitaki MP: Miles Anderson
  - Te Tai Tonga MP: Tākuta Ferris

Area
  - Urban area: 0.86 km^{2} (0.33 sq mi)

Population (June 2025)
  - Urban area: 140
  - Density: 160/km^{2} (420/sq mi)
- Time zone: UTC+12 (NZST)
  - Summer (DST): UTC+13 (NZDT)

Naseby is a small town in the Maniototo region of Central Otago, New Zealand. The town catch phrase is "2000 feet above worry level" indicating its altitude. The town is 140 km (90 mi) from Dunedin. The centre of the town is a registered historic area, and there are many heritage buildings. Naseby has hot summers but particularly cold winters, and is one of New Zealand's principal curling venues. The town also has an ice rink and New Zealand's only ice luge track (360m long). In September 2025, Naseby was designated as an International Dark Sky Community in recognition of its work to eliminate light pollution and protect the night sky.

== Toponymy ==
It is named after Naseby in Northamptonshire, England, which was the site of a major battle during the English Civil War. Previous names of the township were Parker's, Hogburn and Mt Ida.

== History ==
An important township during the gold rush of the 1860s, gold was discovered in the Hogburn in 1863. Much of the town has been preserved from this time and has something of the air of a working museum. At its peak, the population of the town was around 4,000 miners. Eighteen stores, 14 hotels, two butchers and a hospital had also been built to service the miners. In 1881 it was proclaimed a borough which was, at the time, New Zealand's smallest borough by land area. In 1898, a railway line was constructed 12 km away in Ranfurly and as a result services gradually moved away from Naseby to Ranfurly. The 1989 local government reforms abolished the Naseby Borough Council, and changed the town boundaries, incorporating it into the Central Otago District Council.

The local newspaper, the Mount Ida Chronicle was produced from 1869 until 1924 and the Chronicle office is now part of the local Naseby Museum and open to visitors.

== Geography ==
Naseby is located in the Maniototo region of Central Otago, 14 km (9 mi) north-west by road from Ranfurly, and 140 km (90 mi) north-west, via Middlemarch, from Dunedin. The town is at an elevation of around 610 m (2,000 ft), with the Kakanui Range to the east and the Hawkdun Range to the north-west.

The Mount Ida Water Race was built beginning in 1873. The water originates from the Manuherikia River. It winds its way along the Hawkdun Range, and collects water running off the streams as it flows towards Naseby. It was originally designed to feed the gold sluices. It now provides irrigation to farmers in the upper Maniototo area. A track follows the course of the race through the forest and provides mountain biking and walking opportunities.

== Climate ==
Winters in Naseby are harsh for New Zealand, with a mean daily high temperature of 8 degrees Celsius and a mean daily low temperature of -2.6 degrees Celsius in July.

Climate data for Naseby Forest, elevation 607 m (1,991 ft), (1991–2020 normals, extremes 1923–2017)
Month	Jan	Feb	Mar	Apr	May	Jun	Jul	Aug	Sep	Oct	Nov	Dec	Year
Record high °C (°F)	34.1 (93.4)	33.5 (92.3)	30.6 (87.1)	26.8 (80.2)	22.2 (72.0)	18.3 (64.9)	19.0 (66.2)	22.0 (71.6)	25.1 (77.2)	25.5 (77.9)	28.9 (84.0)	31.7 (89.1)	34.1 (93.4)
Mean daily maximum °C (°F)	21.5 (70.7)	21.4 (70.5)	19.2 (66.6)	15.3 (59.5)	11.8 (53.2)	8.5 (47.3)	8.0 (46.4)	10.0 (50.0)	13.0 (55.4)	15.3 (59.5)	17.3 (63.1)	19.9 (67.8)	15.1 (59.2)
Daily mean °C (°F)	14.5 (58.1)	14.3 (57.7)	12.2 (54.0)	9.0 (48.2)	6.2 (43.2)	3.4 (38.1)	2.7 (36.9)	4.5 (40.1)	6.8 (44.2)	8.8 (47.8)	10.6 (51.1)	13.1 (55.6)	8.8 (47.9)
Mean daily minimum °C (°F)	7.5 (45.5)	7.1 (44.8)	5.2 (41.4)	2.6 (36.7)	0.7 (33.3)	−1.7 (28.9)	−2.6 (27.3)	−1.1 (30.0)	0.7 (33.3)	2.4 (36.3)	4.0 (39.2)	6.2 (43.2)	2.6 (36.7)
Record low °C (°F)	−4.4 (24.1)	−3.8 (25.2)	−4.4 (24.1)	−6.1 (21.0)	−11.8 (10.8)	−14.4 (6.1)	−15.0 (5.0)	−12.6 (9.3)	−11.1 (12.0)	−8.3 (17.1)	−6.2 (20.8)	−5.0 (23.0)	−15.0 (5.0)
Average rainfall mm (inches)	79.1 (3.11)	51.6 (2.03)	47.9 (1.89)	46.1 (1.81)	54.6 (2.15)	40.3 (1.59)	26.4 (1.04)	34.3 (1.35)	37.2 (1.46)	58.5 (2.30)	54.7 (2.15)	83.8 (3.30)	614.5 (24.18)
Source: NIWA

== Demographics ==
Historical population
Year	Pop.	±% p.a.
2006	114	—
2013	120	+0.74%
2018	123	+0.50%

Naseby is described by Statistics New Zealand as a rural settlement. It covers 0.86 km^{2} (0.33 sq mi) and had an estimated population of 140 as of June 2025, with a population density of 163 people per km^{2}. It is part of the much larger Maniototo statistical area.

Naseby had a population of 123 at the 2018 New Zealand census, an increase of 3 people (2.5%) since the 2013 census, and an increase of 9 people (7.9%) since the 2006 census. There were 63 households, comprising 69 males and 54 females, giving a sex ratio of 1.28 males per female. The median age was 55.6 years (compared with 37.4 years nationally), with 12 people (9.8%) aged under 15 years, 9 (7.3%) aged 15 to 29, 60 (48.8%) aged 30 to 64, and 42 (34.1%) aged 65 or older.

Ethnicities were 95.1% European/Pākehā, 7.3% Māori, and 4.9% other ethnicities. People may identify with more than one ethnicity.

Although some people chose not to answer the census's question about religious affiliation, 56.1% had no religion, 24.4% were Christian and 4.9% had other religions.

Of those at least 15 years old, 12 (10.8%) people had a bachelor's or higher degree, and 21 (18.9%) people had no formal qualifications. The median income was $24,800, compared with $31,800 nationally. 12 people (10.8%) earned over $70,000 compared to 17.2% nationally. The employment status of those at least 15 was that 45 (40.5%) people were employed full-time, and 24 (21.6%) were part-time.

== Attractions and recreation ==
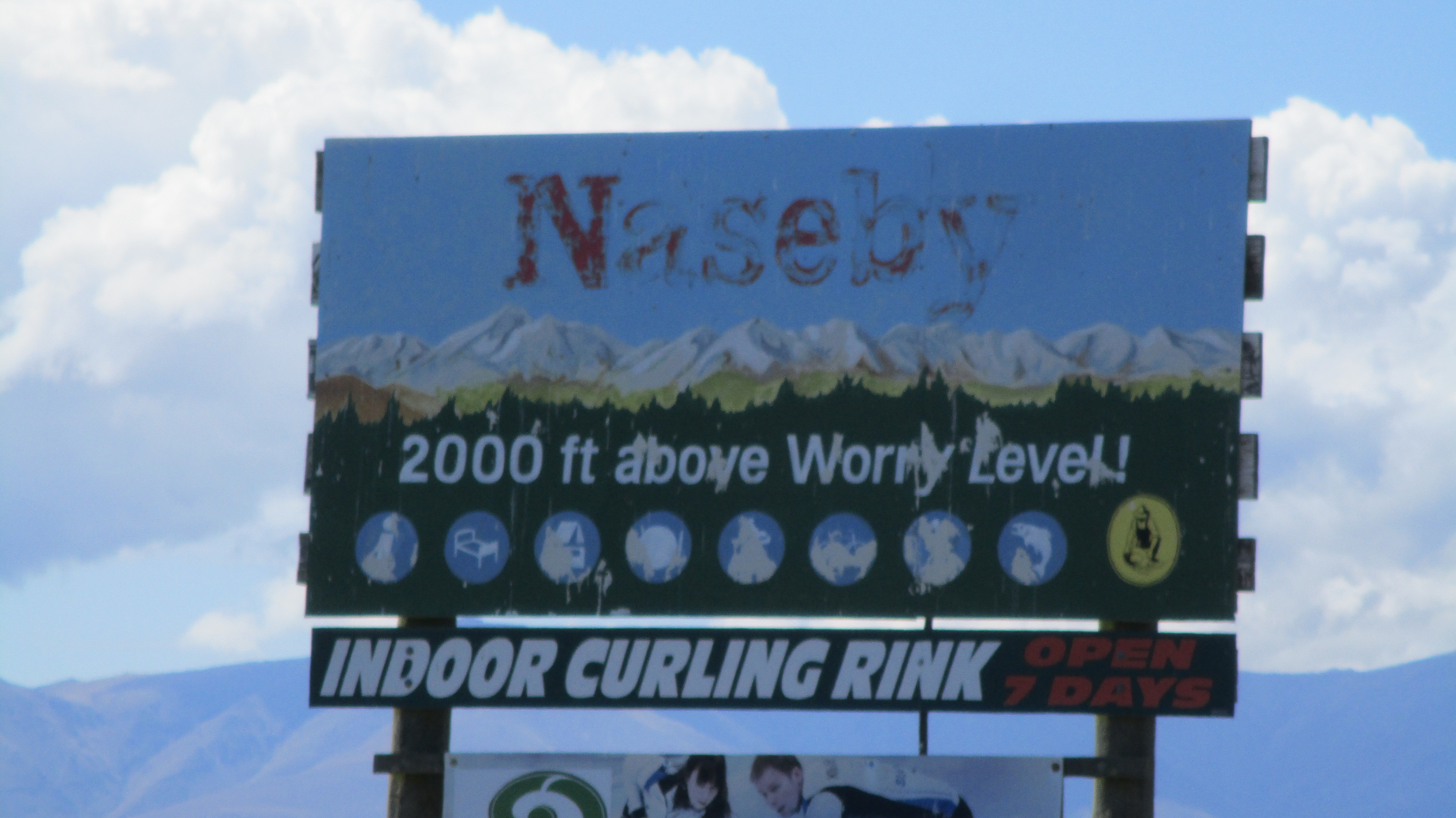
Sign with the Naseby catchphrase

Naseby is a popular tourist destination offering visitors a range of experiences. The population swells to around 3,000 during the summer holiday season. Since 1900, Douglas fir, Larch, and Corsican pine have been planted on the former gold fields and these mature trees form the Naseby forest. The Naseby forest and recreation area is popular for mountain biking, orienteering and walking with many tracks available throughout the forest. There are 52 km of tracks in the forest. A swimming dam just above the township is a popular spot in summer and often freezes over in winter.

Visitors can follow the Goldfields Heritage Trail making their way through historic gold mining sites and buildings.

There are a range of accommodation options available for visitors to stay including lodges, holiday homes, historic hotels and a holiday park which includes two original miners cottages built in 1893.

=== Historic area and buildings ===
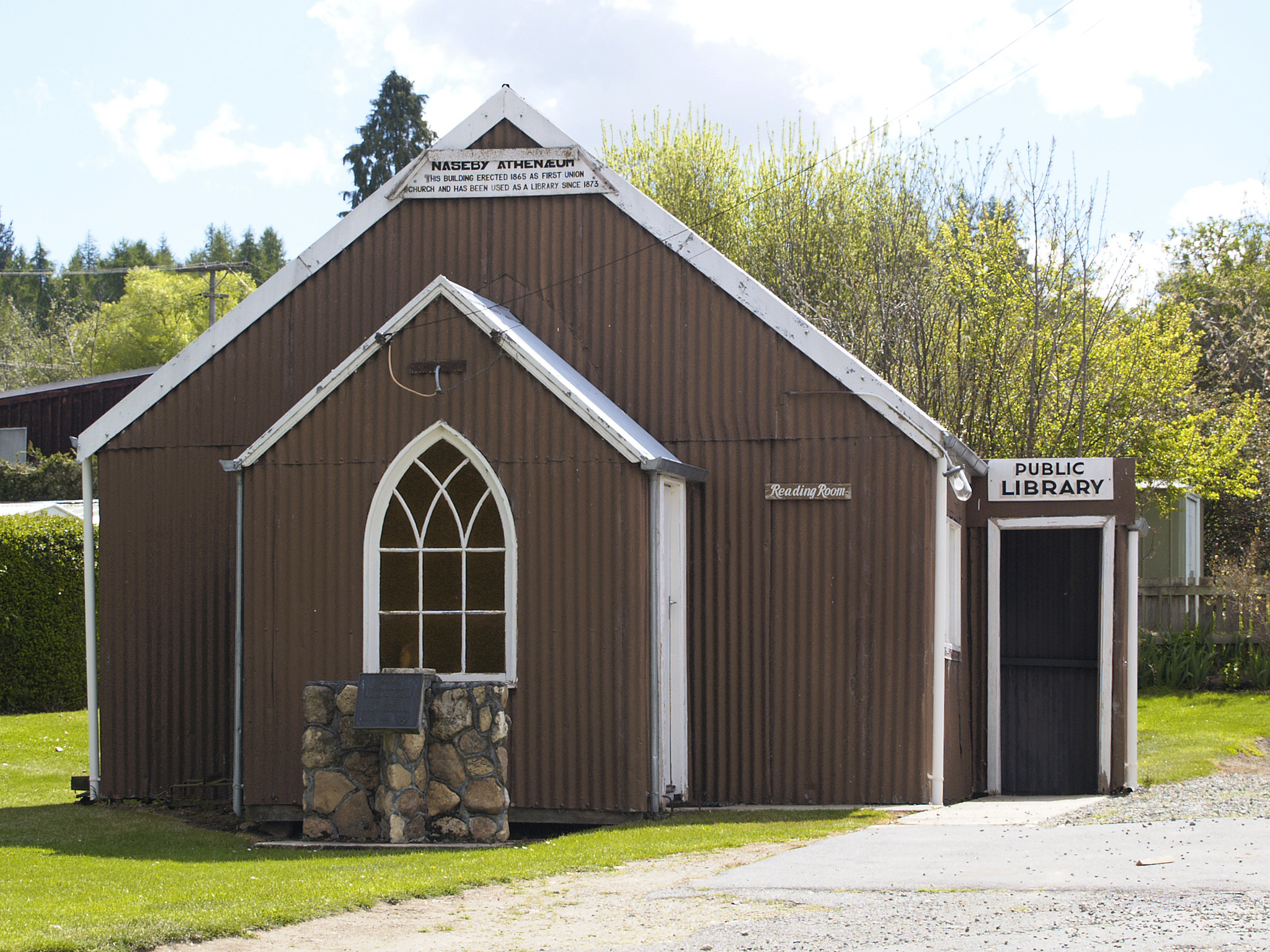
Naseby Athenǽum

The centre of Naseby is registered as a historic area by Heritage New Zealand. Individual buildings in the town also have heritage listing:

- Naseby Athenaeum
- Naseby Post Office (former)
- Naseby Court House (former)
- Naseby Presbyterian Church
- Inder Cottage
- Guffie Cottage
- Ancient Briton Hotel
- St George's Anglican Church
- Strong's Watchmaker Shop

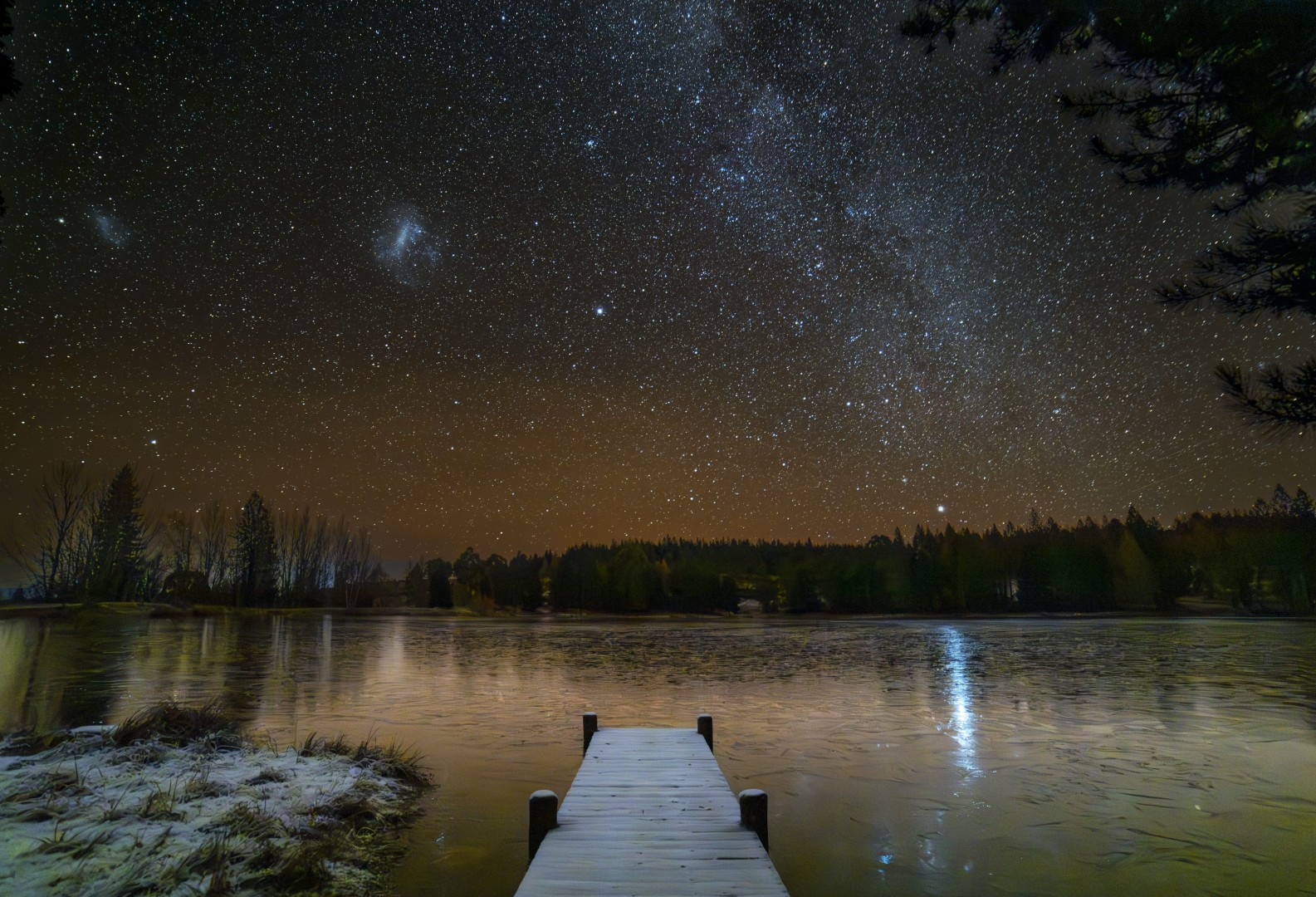
Southern night sky over Coalpit Dam in Naseby, in winter.

=== Dark Sky Community ===
Naseby was designated as an International Dark Sky Community by DarkSky International in September 2025, becoming the first town in New Zealand to achieve this designation. The area of the dark sky precinct is 8 km^{2} (3.1 sq mi). Work towards the designation began in 2016, and required changes to the Central Otago District Plan, adding rules adopted in October 2024 that protect the night sky in Naseby from light pollution. The District Plan rules cover shielding of outdoor luminaires, restrictions on colour temperature and general limits on light levels in a dark sky precinct.

The application for designation reports that measurements of night sky brightness in Naseby have recorded values ranging between 21.10 and 21.77 mag/arcsec^{2} (the higher value corresponds to Bortle scale 1, representing an excellent dark sky site). Astrotourism ventures have been established in the town.

=== Curling ===
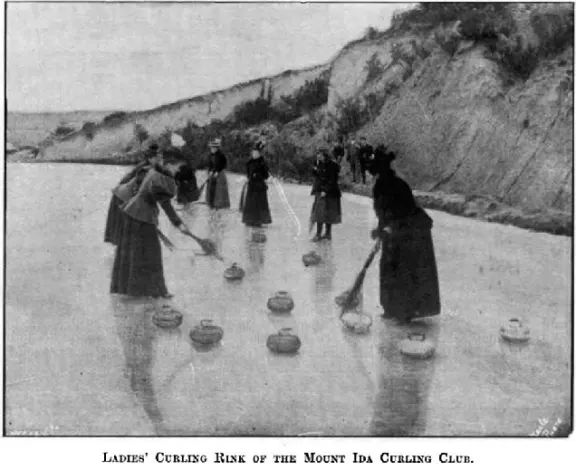
Mt Ida Curling Club late 19th Century

The Naseby Indoor Curling Rink was opened in 2006 providing year round curling to enthusiasts and tourists willing to try the sport. The rink is now part of the Maniototo Adventure park and in addition to Indoor Curling, the centre also offers Outdoor Curling, an Ice Luge, Ice Skating and Ice Hockey.

=== Water race ultramarathon ===
The Naseby forest is the venue for the Great Naseby Water Race, a series of ultramarathon races, held on a 10 km figure-of-eight circuit with race distances of 80 km, 100 km, 200 km, 100-mile (161 km) and 200-mile (322 km). The first of the annual races was held in 2006. They are scheduled in late winter.

== Education ==
Naseby Public School opened in 1865 and closed in 1994. In the early 20th century it included a district high school. The nearest schools are now at Ranfurly.

== In popular culture ==
The cast and crew of the Jane Campion film The Power of the Dog stayed in Naseby while filming in Ida Valley in the Maniototo. Naseby was used for scenes in Goodbye Pork Pie and a Japanese film called The Promise.

== Notable people ==
- Eden Hore, farmer and collector of fashion
- Ada Schnee, German writer
