= Stephen Johns (curler) =

Australian curler

- Curler
- Born: 13 October 1965 (age 61); Saskatoon, Saskatchewan, Canada

Team
- Skip: Hugh Millikin
- Fourth: Dean Hewitt
- Third: Tanner Davis
- Second: Steve Johns
- Alternate: Steve Hewitt

Curling career
- Member Association: Australia
- World Championship: 7 (1995, 1996, 1997, 1998, 2005, 2006, 2008)
- World Mixed Doubles Championship: 2 (2012, 2015)
- Pacific-Asia Championship: 16 (1994, 1995, 1996, 1997, 1998, 1999, 2000, 2001, 2002, 2003, 2004, 2007, 2008, 2012, 2014, 2018)
- Pan Continental Championship: 2 (2024, 2025)
Medal record
Men's curling
Representing Australia
Pacific Championships
Gold medal – first place	1994 Christchurch
Gold medal – first place	1995 Tokoro
Gold medal – first place	1996 Sydney
Gold medal – first place	1997 Karuizawa
Silver medal – second place	1999 Tokoro
Silver medal – second place	2000 Esquimalt
Silver medal – second place	2002 Queenstown
Silver medal – second place	2003 Aomori
Silver medal – second place	2004 Chuncheon
Silver medal – second place	2007 Beijing
Bronze medal – third place	1998 Qualicum Beach
Bronze medal – third place	2001 Jeonju
Bronze medal – third place	2012 Naseby
New Zealand Winter Games
Gold medal – first place	2009 Naseby (men's curling)
Gold medal – first place	2013 Naseby (mixed doubles)

Stephen Johns (born 13 October 1965 in Saskatoon, Saskatchewan, Canada) is an Australian curler originally from Canada.

Johns was a member of the Australian team that competed at the 2008 World Men's Curling Championship held in Grand Forks, North Dakota where the team placed sixth.

Johns has competed in two World Senior Championships in 2017 and 2018.

Johns competed alongside daughter, Veronica Johns, in the Mixed Doubles National Curling Competition in October 2017.
