= 2019 World Mixed Curling Championship =

- Host city: Aberdeen, Scotland
- Arena: Curl Aberdeen
- Dates: 12–19 October
- Winner: Canada
- Skip: Colin Kurz
- Third: Meghan Walter
- Second: Brendan Bilawka
- Lead: Sara Oliver
- Coach: Jim Waite
- Finalist: Germany (Kapp)

The 2019 World Mixed Curling Championship was held from 12 to 19 October in Aberdeen, Scotland.

In the final, Canada's Colin Kurz defeated Germany's Andy Kapp 6-5. It was Canada's second consecutive title at the World Mixed, having won in 2018. It was also Germany's first spot on the podium, having never made it past the quarterfinals in past years.

== Teams ==
Andorra	Australia	Austria	Belarus
Skip: Josep Garcia; Third: Ana Arce; Second: Valentin Ortiz; Lead: Lisa Anne Fowler	Skip: Hugh Millikin; Third: Kim Forge; Second: Steve Johns; Lead: Anne Powell	Skip: Andreas Unterberger; Third: Jill Witschen; Second: Gernot Higatzberger; Lead: Johanna Höss	Skip: Alina Pauliuchyk; Third: Dmitriy Barkan; Second: Marhartya Dziashuk; Lead: Vitali Burmistrau
Belgium	Brazil	Canada	Croatia
Fourth: Dirk Heylen; Third: Danielle Berus; Second: Stephane Vandermeeren; Skip: Veerle Geerinckx	Skip: Sergio Mitsuo Vilela; Third: Alessandra Barros; Second: Marcio Rodrigues; Lead: Samanta Yang	Skip: Colin Kurz; Third: Meghan Walter; Second: Brendan Bilawka; Lead: Sara Oliver	Skip: Alberto Skendrović; Third: Zrinka Muhek; Second: Davor Džepina; Lead: Marija Simunjak
Czech Republic	Denmark	England	Spain
Fourth: Dalibor Miklik; Skip: Eva Miklíková; Second: Samuel Mokriš; Lead: Martina Mokrišová	Skip: Tobias Thune; Third: Jasmin Lander; Second: Henrik Holtermann; Lead: My Larsen	Fourth: Stuart Brand; Skip: Fiona Spain; Second: Jonathan Havercroft; Lead: Kathryn Spain	Skip: Sergio Vez; Third: Oihane Otaegi; Second: Mikel Unanue; Lead: Leire Otaegi
Estonia	Finland	France	Germany
Skip: Erkki Lill; Third: Triin Madisson; Second: Mihhail Vlassov; Lead: Kaidi Elmik	Skip: Markus Sipila; Third: Lotta Immonen; Second: Leo Ouni; Lead: Tiina Suuripää	Skip: Stephane Vergnaud; Third: Eva Lafage; Second: Laurent Vergnaud; Lead: Celine Lagree	Skip: Andy Kapp; Third: Pia-Lisa Schöll; Second: Benny Kapp; Lead: Petra Tschetsch
Hong Kong	Hungary	Ireland	Italy
Skip: Jason Chang; Third: Ling-Yue Hung; Second: Martin Yan; Lead: Ashura Wong	Skip: György Nagy; Third: Ildikó Szekeres; Second: Gergely Szabo; Lead: Blanka Dencso	Skip: John Wilson; Third: Ailsa Anderson; Second: Craig Whyte; Lead: Niamh Begley Luke	Fourth: Fabio Sola; Skip: Denise Pimpini; Second: Julien Michele Genre; Lead: Sara Aliberti
Japan	Kazakhstan	South Korea	Kosovo
Skip: Takumi Maeda; Third: Momoha Tabata; Second: Asei Nakahara; Lead: Mina Kobayashi	Skip: Viktor Kim; Third: Sitora Alliyarova; Second: Abylaikhan Zhuzbay; Lead: Angelina Ebauyer	Skip: Seong Yu-jin; Third: Jang Hye-ji; Second: Jeon Jae-ik; Lead: Song Yu-jin	Skip: Peter Andersen; Third: Eldena Dakaj; Second: Eric Shabaj; Lead: Mirjeta Shatri
Latvia	Luxembourg	Nigeria	Norway
Fourth: Jānis Rudzītis; Skip: Jeļena Rudzīte; Second: Didzis Pētersons; Lead: Dace Spilnere-Pūciņa	Skip: Alex Benoy; Third: Karen Wauters; Second: Marc Husi; Lead: Susi Benoy	Skip: Tijani Cole; Third: Susana Cole; Second: Harold Woods III; Lead: Carolay Cole-Strehlow	Fourth: Wilhelm Næss; Skip: Ingvild Skaga; Second: Harald Skarsheim Rian; Lead: Eirin Mesloe
New Zealand	Poland	Russia	Scotland
Fourth: Mhairi-Bronte Duncan; Third: Benjamin Frew; Skip: Thivya Jeyaranjan; Lead: Kieran Ford	Skip: Bartosz Dzikowski; Third: Ewa Nogly; Second: Konrad Stych; Lead: Zuzanna Rybicka	Skip: Alexander Eremin; Third: Anastasia Moskaleva; Second: Daniil Goriachev; Lead: Daria Morozova	Skip: Luke Carson; Third: Kirstin Bousie; Second: Mark Taylor; Lead: Katie McMillan
Slovakia	Slovenia	Sweden	Switzerland
Fourth: Daniela Matulová; Skip: Juraj Gallo; Second: Slávka Makovníková; Lead: Tomáš Pitoňák	Skip: Tomas Tišler; Third: Nadja Pipan; Second: Jošt Lajovec; Lead: Maruša Gorišek	Skip: Simon Olofsson; Third: Vilma Åhlström; Second: Axel Sjöberg; Lead: Linda Stenlund	Fourth: Martin Rios; Third: Jenny Perret; Second: Kevin Wunderlin; Skip: Manuela Siegrist
Chinese Taipei	Turkey	United States	Wales
Skip: Randolph Shen; Third: Ko Yang; Second: Ken Hsu; Lead: Stephanie Lee	Fourth: Dilşat Yıldız; Skip: Uğurcan Karagöz; Second: Öznur Polat; Lead: Alican Karataş	Skip: Hunter Clawson; Third: Katherine Gourianova; Second: Eli Clawson; Lead: Sydney Mullaney	Skip: Adrian Meikle; Third: Dawn Watson; Second: Andrew Tanner; Lead: Laura Beever

== Round robin standings ==
Final Round Robin Standings

Key
Teams to Playoffs

Group A	Skip	W	L
Canada	Colin Kurz	7	0
Germany	Andy Kapp	5	2
Slovakia	Juraj Gallo	5	2
Belarus	Alina Pauliuchyk	4	3
Hong Kong	Jason Chang	4	3
Estonia	Erkki Lill	2	5
Kosovo	Peter Andersen	1	6
Nigeria	Tijani Cole	0	7

Group B	Skip	W	L
Norway	Ingvild Skaga	6	1
Denmark	Tobias Thune	6	1
Poland	Bartosz Dzikowski	5	2
Czech Republic	Eva Miklíková	5	2
Wales	Adrian Meikle	3	4
New Zealand	Thivya Jeyaranjan	2	5
Croatia	Alberto Skendrović	1	6
Andorra	Josep Garcia	0	7

Group C	Skip	W	L
Spain	Sergio Vez	7	0
United States	Hunter Clawson	5	2
Hungary	Gyorgy Nagy	5	2
Sweden	Simon Olofsson	4	3
Kazakhstan	Viktor Kim	3	4
Australia	Hugh Millikin	3	4
Latvia	Jeļena Rudzīte	1	6
Brazil	Sergio Mitsuo Vilela	0	7

Group D	Skip	W	L
Scotland	Luke Carson	7	0
Ireland	John Wilson	5	2
Turkey	Uğurcan Karagöz	4	3
Italy	Denise Pimpini	4	3
Japan	Takumi Maeda	4	3
Slovenia	Tomas Tišler	2	5
Chinese Taipei	Randolph Shen	2	5
Luxembourg	Alex Benoy	0	7

Group E	Skip	W	L
Russia	Alexander Eremin	7	0
Switzerland	Martin Rios	6	1
South Korea	Seong Yu-jin	5	2
Finland	Markus Sipila	4	3
England	Fiona Spain	3	4
France	Stephane Vergnaud	2	5
Austria	Andreas Unterberger	1	6
Belgium	Veerle Geerinckx	0	7

== Round robin results ==
=== Draw 1 ===
12 October, 8:00 am

Sheet A	1	2	3	4	5	6	7	8	Final
Brazil	0	1	0	1	0	0	X	X	2
Hungary 🔨	4	0	5	0	3	2	X	X	14

Sheet C	1	2	3	4	5	6	7	8	Final
Canada	0	0	0	2	2	0	0	2	6
Germany 🔨	0	1	1	0	0	1	0	0	3

Sheet E	1	2	3	4	5	6	7	8	Final
Slovakia	X	X	X	X	X	X	X	X	W
Kosovo	X	X	X	X	X	X	X	X	L

Sheet B	1	2	3	4	5	6	7	8	Final
Belarus 🔨	1	1	0	1	0	0	1	2	6
Hong Kong	0	0	2	0	1	1	0	0	4

Sheet D	1	2	3	4	5	6	7	8	Final
Estonia	4	2	3	1	2	0	4	X	16
Nigeria 🔨	0	0	0	0	0	1	0	X	1

Sheet F	1	2	3	4	5	6	7	8	Final
Latvia 🔨	0	1	0	0	2	0	2	X	5
Kazakhstan	3	0	3	2	0	4	0	X	12

=== Draw 2 ===
12 October, 12:00 pm

Sheet A	1	2	3	4	5	6	7	8	Final
Ireland	0	0	1	0	4	1	0	2	8
Slovenia 🔨	1	2	0	1	0	0	1	0	5

Sheet C	1	2	3	4	5	6	7	8	Final
Luxembourg	0	0	2	0	1	0	X	X	3
Japan 🔨	2	2	0	1	0	6	X	X	11

Sheet E	1	2	3	4	5	6	7	8	9	Final
France 🔨	1	0	0	2	0	1	0	1	0	5
South Korea	0	1	1	0	2	0	1	0	1	6

Sheet B	1	2	3	4	5	6	7	8	Final
Italy	1	0	1	0	0	0	X	X	2
Scotland 🔨	0	3	0	1	2	1	X	X	7

Sheet D	1	2	3	4	5	6	7	8	Final
Belgium	2	0	0	1	0	2	0	X	5
Finland 🔨	0	3	3	0	3	0	3	X	12

Sheet F	1	2	3	4	5	6	7	8	Final
England	1	1	2	0	0	3	0	X	7
Austria 🔨	0	0	0	1	2	0	1	X	4

=== Draw 3 ===
12 October, 4:00 pm

Sheet A	1	2	3	4	5	6	7	8	Final
United States 🔨	2	0	0	0	1	1	0	0	4
Spain	0	1	0	1	0	0	2	3	7

Sheet C	1	2	3	4	5	6	7	8	Final
Denmark	0	0	1	0	1	0	0	1	3
Norway 🔨	2	1	0	1	0	1	1	0	6

Sheet E	1	2	3	4	5	6	7	8	Final
Wales	0	0	1	0	0	1	0	X	2
Poland 🔨	0	2	0	2	0	0	1	X	5

Sheet B	1	2	3	4	5	6	7	8	Final
New Zealand	0	1	0	0	0	2	1	X	4
Czech Republic 🔨	3	0	3	1	1	0	0	X	8

Sheet D	1	2	3	4	5	6	7	8	Final
Andorra 🔨	1	0	2	0	0	0	0	X	3
Croatia	0	1	0	1	1	2	1	X	6

Sheet F	1	2	3	4	5	6	7	8	Final
Australia 🔨	1	0	1	0	2	0	1	0	5
Sweden	0	2	0	4	0	0	0	2	8

=== Draw 4 ===
12 October, 8:30 pm

Sheet A	1	2	3	4	5	6	7	8	9	Final
South Korea	0	1	1	1	0	1	0	2	1	7
Finland 🔨	2	0	0	0	2	0	2	0	0	6

Sheet C	1	2	3	4	5	6	7	8	Final
England 🔨	1	0	0	1	0	2	0	1	5
France	0	1	1	0	1	0	1	0	4

Sheet E	1	2	3	4	5	6	7	8	9	Final
Chinese Taipei 🔨	3	1	2	0	0	0	0	1	2	9
Turkey	0	0	0	1	3	1	2	0	0	7

Sheet B	1	2	3	4	5	6	7	8	Final
Switzerland	0	0	1	1	0	1	0	X	3
Russia 🔨	0	2	0	0	3	0	1	X	6

Sheet D	1	2	3	4	5	6	7	8	Final
Ireland 🔨	1	1	0	2	0	2	0	1	7
Italy	0	0	1	0	4	0	1	0	6

Sheet F	1	2	3	4	5	6	7	8	Final
Scotland 🔨	0	1	0	2	0	0	2	0	5
Japan	1	0	1	0	1	1	0	0	4

=== Draw 5 ===
13 October, 8:00 am

Sheet A	1	2	3	4	5	6	7	8	Final
Poland	0	0	1	1	0	3	0	0	5
Denmark 🔨	2	2	0	0	1	0	2	1	8

Sheet C	1	2	3	4	5	6	7	8	Final
United States	2	2	4	2	0	2	X	X	12
Brazil 🔨	0	0	0	0	2	0	X	X	2

Sheet E	1	2	3	4	5	6	7	8	Final
Sweden 🔨	0	0	0	1	0	2	0	X	3
Spain	0	0	1	0	2	0	2	X	5

Sheet B	1	2	3	4	5	6	7	8	Final
Croatia	0	0	1	0	5	0	0	X	6
Wales 🔨	2	1	0	2	0	1	2	X	8

Sheet D	1	2	3	4	5	6	7	8	Final
Norway 🔨	2	1	2	0	3	1	1	X	10
New Zealand	0	0	0	5	0	0	0	X	5

Sheet F	1	2	3	4	5	6	7	8	Final
Czech Republic 🔨	3	0	2	1	4	1	X	X	11
Andorra	0	1	0	0	0	0	X	X	1

=== Draw 6 ===
13 October, 12:00 pm

Sheet A	1	2	3	4	5	6	7	8	Final
Kosovo 🔨	2	1	1	0	2	2	1	X	9
Nigeria	0	0	0	3	0	0	0	X	3

Sheet C	1	2	3	4	5	6	7	8	Final
Latvia	0	1	0	4	0	0	0	0	5
Australia 🔨	0	0	1	0	1	1	1	3	7

Sheet E	1	2	3	4	5	6	7	8	Final
Hong Kong 🔨	1	1	0	0	2	1	1	0	6
Estonia	0	0	1	1	0	0	0	2	4

Sheet B	1	2	3	4	5	6	7	8	Final
Hungary	0	3	3	0	2	0	1	X	9
Kazakhstan 🔨	1	0	0	1	0	2	0	X	4

Sheet D	1	2	3	4	5	6	7	8	Final
Slovakia	0	1	0	0	2	0	X	X	3
Germany 🔨	2	0	0	5	0	3	X	X	10

Sheet F	1	2	3	4	5	6	7	8	Final
Canada 🔨	1	1	1	1	0	1	0	X	5
Belarus	0	0	0	0	1	0	1	X	2

=== Draw 7 ===
13 October, 4:00 pm

Sheet A	1	2	3	4	5	6	7	8	Final
Scotland 🔨	5	0	1	0	3	3	X	X	12
Luxembourg	0	1	0	2	0	0	X	X	3

Sheet C	1	2	3	4	5	6	7	8	Final
Ireland	0	1	3	1	0	0	0	1	6
Chinese Taipei 🔨	1	0	0	0	1	1	1	0	4

Sheet E	1	2	3	4	5	6	7	8	Final
Austria	0	0	0	1	1	0	X	X	2
Russia 🔨	4	2	2	0	0	3	X	X	11

Sheet B	1	2	3	4	5	6	7	8	Final
Slovenia	0	0	2	0	2	1	0	0	5
Turkey 🔨	0	1	0	2	0	0	1	2	6

Sheet D	1	2	3	4	5	6	7	8	Final
Finland 🔨	0	1	1	0	3	5	X	X	10
France	0	0	0	4	0	0	X	X	4

Sheet F	1	2	3	4	5	6	7	8	Final
South Korea 🔨	3	0	0	3	2	0	4	X	12
Belgium	0	2	0	0	0	1	0	X	3

=== Draw 8 ===
13 October, 8:00 pm

Sheet A	1	2	3	4	5	6	7	8	Final
Andorra 🔨	0	0	0	1	0	1	X	X	2
New Zealand	1	2	4	0	2	0	X	X	9

Sheet C	1	2	3	4	5	6	7	8	Final
Japan	0	1	1	0	2	0	0	0	4
Italy 🔨	1	0	0	1	0	3	0	2	7

Sheet E	1	2	3	4	5	6	7	8	Final
Poland 🔨	4	0	5	1	4	1	X	X	15
Croatia	0	1	0	0	0	0	X	X	1

Sheet B	1	2	3	4	5	6	7	8	Final
Czech Republic 🔨	2	0	2	0	1	2	2	X	9
Norway	0	2	0	2	0	0	0	X	4

Sheet D	1	2	3	4	5	6	7	8	Final
England	0	0	1	0	0	0	0	X	1
Switzerland 🔨	0	2	0	2	1	1	1	X	7

Sheet F	1	2	3	4	5	6	7	8	Final
Denmark 🔨	2	2	3	0	4	3	X	X	14
Wales	0	0	0	1	0	0	X	X	1

=== Draw 9 ===
14 October, 8:00 am

Sheet A	1	2	3	4	5	6	7	8	Final
Australia	0	1	0	0	2	0	3	0	6
Kazakhstan 🔨	0	0	3	1	0	2	0	1	7

Sheet C	1	2	3	4	5	6	7	8	Final
Hungary 🔨	1	2	0	4	0	1	1	X	9
Sweden	0	0	2	0	1	0	0	X	3

Sheet E	1	2	3	4	5	6	7	8	Final
Slovenia 🔨	1	1	1	0	4	0	4	X	11
Luxembourg	0	0	0	1	0	1	0	X	2

Sheet B	1	2	3	4	5	6	7	8	Final
Austria 🔨	1	0	1	1	0	1	0	1	5
Belgium	0	1	0	0	1	0	2	0	4

Sheet D	1	2	3	4	5	6	7	8	Final
United States	0	2	0	0	3	0	2	X	7
Latvia 🔨	0	0	1	1	0	1	0	X	3

=== Draw 10 ===
14 October, 12:00 pm

Sheet A	1	2	3	4	5	6	7	8	Final
Italy 🔨	0	0	2	0	2	1	5	X	10
Chinese Taipei	0	1	0	1	0	0	0	X	2

Sheet C	1	2	3	4	5	6	7	8	Final
Russia 🔨	0	0	3	2	4	1	X	X	10
South Korea	0	2	0	0	0	0	X	X	2

Sheet E	1	2	3	4	5	6	7	8	Final
Finland	2	1	0	1	1	0	3	X	8
England 🔨	0	0	1	0	0	2	0	X	3

Sheet B	1	2	3	4	5	6	7	8	Final
Japan 🔨	1	0	0	2	0	0	0	X	3
Ireland	0	2	0	0	4	1	2	X	9

Sheet D	1	2	3	4	5	6	7	8	Final
Turkey	0	2	0	0	0	1	0	X	3
Scotland 🔨	1	0	0	2	1	0	1	X	5

Sheet F	1	2	3	4	5	6	7	8	Final
France	0	0	1	0	1	0	0	0	2
Switzerland 🔨	2	0	0	0	0	1	1	2	6

=== Draw 11 ===
14 October, 4:00 pm

Sheet A	1	2	3	4	5	6	7	8	Final
Belarus 🔨	0	0	0	0	0	0	0	X	0
Germany	1	1	0	2	2	1	1	X	8

Sheet C	1	2	3	4	5	6	7	8	Final
Slovakia 🔨	0	0	1	0	1	0	2	X	4
Canada	3	0	0	2	0	2	0	X	7

Sheet E	1	2	3	4	5	6	7	8	Final
Brazil	0	0	0	0	1	1	X	X	2
Kazakhstan 🔨	2	4	2	2	0	0	X	X	10

Sheet B	1	2	3	4	5	6	7	8	Final
Denmark 🔨	1	1	1	1	0	2	X	X	6
Andorra	0	0	0	0	1	0	X	X	1

Sheet D	1	2	3	4	5	6	7	8	Final
Nigeria	0	0	0	0	0	0	X	X	0
Hong Kong 🔨	4	1	1	3	1	2	X	X	12

Sheet F	1	2	3	4	5	6	7	8	Final
Estonia	4	0	2	1	7	1	3	X	18
Kosovo 🔨	0	1	0	0	0	0	0	X	1

=== Draw 12 ===
14 October, 8:00 pm

Sheet A	1	2	3	4	5	6	7	8	Final
Hungary 🔨	2	1	0	0	1	0	0	X	4
United States	0	0	3	1	0	2	1	X	7

Sheet C	1	2	3	4	5	6	7	8	Final
Norway 🔨	3	4	2	4	2	1	X	X	16
Croatia	0	0	0	0	0	0	X	X	0

Sheet E	1	2	3	4	5	6	7	8	9	Final
New Zealand 🔨	0	0	0	0	0	2	0	2	0	4
Wales	1	0	1	0	0	0	2	0	1	5

Sheet B	1	2	3	4	5	6	7	8	Final
Australia 🔨	1	0	0	0	0	1	X	X	2
Spain	0	2	0	2	3	0	X	X	7

Sheet D	1	2	3	4	5	6	7	8	Final
Poland	2	1	0	2	0	0	1	X	6
Czech Republic	0	0	1	0	0	2	0	X	3

Sheet F	1	2	3	4	5	6	7	8	Final
Sweden 🔨	2	3	1	1	0	1	1	X	9
Latvia	0	0	0	0	2	0	0	X	2

=== Draw 13 ===
15 October, 8:00 am

Sheet A	1	2	3	4	5	6	7	8	Final
England	2	0	0	0	1	0	0	X	3
Russia 🔨	0	2	1	1	0	3	2	X	9

Sheet C	1	2	3	4	5	6	7	8	Final
South Korea 🔨	0	2	0	0	0	1	0	X	3
Switzerland	0	0	0	3	1	0	1	X	5

Sheet D	1	2	3	4	5	6	7	8	Final
Scotland 🔨	1	0	3	3	0	4	X	X	11
Chinese Taipei	0	3	0	0	1	0	X	X	4

Sheet F	1	2	3	4	5	6	7	8	Final
Ireland	0	1	0	0	0	2	0	0	3
Turkey 🔨	1	0	1	1	1	0	0	1	5

=== Draw 14 ===
15 October, 12:00 pm

Sheet A	1	2	3	4	5	6	7	8	Final
Croatia	0	0	0	2	0	0	X	X	2
Czech Republic 🔨	5	1	2	0	1	3	X	X	12

Sheet C	1	2	3	4	5	6	7	8	Final
New Zealand 🔨	1	0	0	1	0	1	0	X	3
Denmark	0	2	1	0	2	0	1	X	6

Sheet E	1	2	3	4	5	6	7	8	Final
Latvia	1	0	0	1	0	1	0	X	3
Hungary 🔨	0	1	1	0	3	0	2	X	7

Sheet B	1	2	3	4	5	6	7	8	Final
United States	0	2	0	4	0	2	X	X	8
Sweden 🔨	1	0	1	0	1	0	X	X	3

Sheet D	1	2	3	4	5	6	7	8	Final
Wales 🔨	0	0	4	0	2	1	0	X	7
Andorra	1	1	0	1	0	0	2	X	5

Sheet F	1	2	3	4	5	6	7	8	Final
Norway 🔨	1	0	2	0	2	1	0	X	6
Poland	0	1	0	1	0	0	2	X	4

=== Draw 15 ===
15 October, 4:00 pm

Sheet A	1	2	3	4	5	6	7	8	Final
Chinese Taipei	0	0	0	0	1	0	X	X	1
Japan 🔨	6	1	1	1	0	1	X	X	10

Sheet C	1	2	3	4	5	6	7	8	Final
Turkey 🔨	0	2	0	5	0	0	3	X	10
Luxembourg	1	0	1	0	1	0	0	X	3

Sheet E	1	2	3	4	5	6	7	8	Final
Italy 🔨	3	0	1	2	0	1	0	X	7
Slovenia	0	1	0	0	3	0	1	X	5

Sheet B	1	2	3	4	5	6	7	8	Final
France 🔨	1	2	0	1	2	0	1	X	7
Austria	0	0	1	0	0	3	0	X	4

Sheet D	1	2	3	4	5	6	7	8	Final
Russia 🔨	1	0	1	2	0	6	X	X	10
Belgium	0	1	0	0	2	0	X	X	3

Sheet F	1	2	3	4	5	6	7	8	Final
Switzerland 🔨	0	2	0	2	0	0	4	1	9
Finland	0	0	2	0	0	3	0	0	5

=== Draw 16 ===
15 October, 8:00 pm

Sheet A	1	2	3	4	5	6	7	8	Final
Hong Kong 🔨	3	0	1	1	0	1	0	0	6
Canada	0	2	0	0	3	0	2	1	8

Sheet C	1	2	3	4	5	6	7	8	Final
Kazakhstan	0	0	1	1	0	1	1	X	4
Spain 🔨	2	1	0	0	4	0	0	X	7

Sheet E	1	2	3	4	5	6	7	8	Final
Kosovo	0	0	0	0	0	1	X	X	1
Germany 🔨	4	3	2	4	1	0	X	X	14

Sheet B	1	2	3	4	5	6	7	8	Final
Estonia	4	0	0	0	0	0	1	1	6
Belarus 🔨	0	2	1	4	0	1	0	0	8

Sheet D	1	2	3	4	5	6	7	8	Final
Brazil	0	0	0	0	0	1	0	X	1
Australia 🔨	1	1	2	2	2	0	2	X	10

Sheet F	1	2	3	4	5	6	7	8	Final
Nigeria 🔨	0	0	0	0	0	0	0	X	0
Slovakia	2	3	2	1	4	1	1	X	14

=== Draw 17 ===
16 October, 8:00 am

Sheet A	1	2	3	4	5	6	7	8	Final
France 🔨	2	1	0	4	1	2	X	X	10
Belgium	0	0	2	0	0	0	X	X	2

Sheet C	1	2	3	4	5	6	7	8	Final
Czech Republic 🔨	2	0	2	0	2	0	2	X	8
Wales	0	1	0	1	0	1	0	X	3

Sheet E	1	2	3	4	5	6	7	8	Final
Norway	1	2	3	1	3	5	X	X	15
Andorra 🔨	0	0	0	0	0	0	X	X	0

Sheet B	1	2	3	4	5	6	7	8	Final
Poland 🔨	3	3	1	3	0	2	X	X	12
New Zealand	0	0	0	0	1	0	X	X	1

Sheet D	1	2	3	4	5	6	7	8	Final
Croatia	0	1	0	2	0	0	X	X	3
Denmark 🔨	4	0	2	0	2	4	X	X	12

Sheet F	1	2	3	4	5	6	7	8	Final
Italy 🔨	5	0	3	2	2	2	X	X	14
Luxembourg	0	1	0	0	0	0	X	X	1

=== Draw 18 ===
16 October, 12:00 pm

Sheet A	1	2	3	4	5	6	7	8	Final
Switzerland	2	0	1	1	3	0	X	X	7
Austria 🔨	0	1	0	0	0	1	X	X	2

Sheet C	1	2	3	4	5	6	7	8	Final
Germany 🔨	1	2	0	1	0	0	2	0	6
Estonia	0	0	1	0	1	1	0	1	4

Sheet E	1	2	3	4	5	6	7	8	Final
Canada 🔨	4	1	1	2	4	0	3	X	15
Nigeria	0	0	0	0	0	1	0	X	1

Sheet B	1	2	3	4	5	6	7	8	Final
Hong Kong	0	3	0	1	0	0	0	1	5
Slovakia 🔨	2	0	2	0	0	1	1	0	6

Sheet D	1	2	3	4	5	6	7	8	Final
Belarus 🔨	1	2	2	3	0	3	X	X	11
Kosovo	0	0	0	0	1	0	X	X	1

Sheet F	1	2	3	4	5	6	7	8	Final
Chinese Taipei 🔨	1	0	0	0	0	2	0	X	3
Slovenia	0	1	1	1	2	0	1	X	6

=== Draw 19 ===
16 October, 4:00 pm

Sheet A	1	2	3	4	5	6	7	8	Final
Spain	0	2	3	0	3	0	1	X	9
Latvia 🔨	0	0	0	2	0	1	0	X	3

Sheet C	1	2	3	4	5	6	7	8	Final
Belgium	0	0	0	0	0	1	X	X	1
England 🔨	3	2	4	2	2	0	X	X	13

Sheet E	1	2	3	4	5	6	7	8	Final
Turkey	0	0	0	0	1	0	1	X	2
Japan 🔨	0	0	1	2	0	2	0	X	5

Sheet B	1	2	3	4	5	6	7	8	Final
Russia 🔨	2	0	1	0	4	0	0	X	7
Finland	0	2	0	1	0	1	1	X	5

Sheet D	1	2	3	4	5	6	7	8	Final
Luxembourg	0	0	1	0	0	1	X	X	2
Ireland 🔨	3	1	0	4	2	0	X	X	10

Sheet F	1	2	3	4	5	6	7	8	Final
Hungary	0	1	1	1	0	1	1	1	6
Australia 🔨	4	0	0	0	1	0	0	0	5

=== Draw 20 ===
16 October, 8:00 pm

Sheet A	1	2	3	4	5	6	7	8	Final
Sweden 🔨	2	0	1	2	0	5	X	X	10
Brazil	0	1	0	0	1	0	X	X	2

Sheet C	1	2	3	4	5	6	7	8	Final
Slovenia 🔨	1	0	2	0	1	2	0	0	6
Scotland	0	2	0	3	0	0	2	1	8

Sheet E	1	2	3	4	5	6	7	8	Final
Belarus 🔨	0	0	2	1	0	1	0	0	4
Slovakia	1	0	0	0	2	0	0	2	5

Sheet B	1	2	3	4	5	6	7	8	Final
Germany 🔨	5	0	4	6	2	4	X	X	21
Nigeria	0	1	0	0	0	0	X	X	1

Sheet D	1	2	3	4	5	6	7	8	Final
Austria	0	1	0	0	1	0	X	X	2
South Korea 🔨	0	0	3	3	0	3	X	X	9

Sheet F	1	2	3	4	5	6	7	8	Final
Kazakhstan 🔨	0	1	0	2	0	0	3	0	6
United States	2	0	1	0	0	2	0	2	7

=== Draw 21 ===
17 October, 8:00 am

Sheet B	1	2	3	4	5	6	7	8	Final
Luxembourg	1	1	0	0	0	0	0	X	2
Chinese Taipei 🔨	0	0	1	1	1	1	1	X	5

Sheet D	1	2	3	4	5	6	7	8	Final
Canada 🔨	2	1	0	0	4	0	X	X	7
Estonia	0	0	0	1	0	1	X	X	2

Sheet F	1	2	3	4	5	6	7	8	Final
New Zealand 🔨	1	3	0	0	0	1	2	0	7
Croatia	0	0	1	2	1	0	0	2	6

Sheet C	1	2	3	4	5	6	7	8	Final
Hong Kong 🔨	0	0	2	0	2	1	1	X	6
Kosovo	0	1	0	1	0	0	0	X	2

Sheet E	1	2	3	4	5	6	7	8	Final
Belgium	0	0	0	0	1	0	2	X	3
Switzerland 🔨	1	1	1	1	0	2	0	X	6

=== Draw 22 ===
17 October, 12:00 pm

Sheet A	1	2	3	4	5	6	7	8	Final
Wales	0	0	1	0	0	0	0	X	1
Norway 🔨	1	1	0	1	1	3	2	X	9

Sheet C	1	2	3	4	5	6	7	8	Final
Andorra	0	0	1	0	0	0	X	X	1
Poland 🔨	2	1	0	1	2	1	X	X	7

Sheet E	1	2	3	4	5	6	7	8	Final
Denmark 🔨	0	0	0	2	1	3	0	X	6
Czech Republic	0	0	0	0	0	0	1	X	1

Sheet B	1	2	3	4	5	6	7	8	Final
South Korea 🔨	3	0	1	2	0	1	X	X	7
England	0	1	0	0	1	0	X	X	2

Sheet D	1	2	3	4	5	6	7	8	Final
Japan 🔨	4	0	4	0	3	0	X	X	11
Slovenia	0	1	0	2	0	2	X	X	5

Sheet F	1	2	3	4	5	6	7	8	Final
Spain 🔨	2	0	1	3	1	0	X	X	7
Brazil	0	1	0	0	0	1	X	X	2

=== Draw 23 ===
17 October, 4:00 pm

Sheet A	1	2	3	4	5	6	7	8	Final
Estonia	0	0	0	0	0	1	X	X	1
Slovakia 🔨	2	0	2	2	1	0	X	X	7

Sheet C	1	2	3	4	5	6	7	8	Final
Nigeria	0	0	0	0	0	1	0	X	1
Belarus 🔨	2	5	2	1	3	0	6	X	19

Sheet E	1	2	3	4	5	6	7	8	Final
Australia 🔨	3	0	1	0	2	0	0	1	7
United States	0	1	0	2	0	1	1	0	5

Sheet B	1	2	3	4	5	6	7	8	Final
Kosovo	0	1	0	0	2	0	X	X	3
Canada 🔨	5	0	5	3	0	4	X	X	17

Sheet D	1	2	3	4	5	6	7	8	Final
Kazakhstan	0	1	0	2	0	0	2	0	5
Sweden 🔨	1	0	1	0	2	2	0	1	7

Sheet F	1	2	3	4	5	6	7	8	Final
Germany	0	1	0	1	0	1	2	1	6
Hong Kong 🔨	3	0	3	0	1	0	0	0	7

=== Draw 24 ===
17 October, 8:00 pm

Sheet A	1	2	3	4	5	6	7	8	9	10	Final
Turkey	0	2	0	0	0	1	0	2	0	3	8
Italy 🔨	1	0	1	1	1	0	1	0	0	0	5

Sheet C	1	2	3	4	5	6	7	8	Final
Finland	1	3	1	1	1	1	X	X	8
Austria 🔨	0	0	0	0	0	0	X	X	0

Sheet E	1	2	3	4	5	6	7	8	Final
Scotland	0	0	3	1	0	2	1	X	7
Ireland 🔨	1	1	0	0	1	0	0	X	3

Sheet B	1	2	3	4	5	6	7	8	Final
Brazil	0	2	0	1	0	0	X	X	3
Latvia 🔨	3	0	5	0	2	1	X	X	11

Sheet D	1	2	3	4	5	6	7	8	Final
Spain	0	0	0	3	2	1	0	1	7
Hungary 🔨	0	2	1	0	0	0	2	0	5

Sheet F	1	2	3	4	5	6	7	8	Final
Russia 🔨	2	0	2	0	2	3	X	X	9
France	0	1	0	1	0	0	X	X	2

== Playoffs ==
Once group play has finished the top three teams from each group, as well as the best fourth place team, will proceed to a four round playoff. The playoff teams will be seeded based on their final ranking within their group as well as their Draw Shot Challenge score.

First round
1	Canada	9
16	Sweden	4
8	Denmark	8
9	Ireland	3
4	Norway	9
13	Slovakia	1
5	Spain	2
12	Hungary	6
2	Russia	1
15	South Korea	9
7	Switzerland	7
10	United States	2
3	Scotland	6
14	Turkey	3
6	Germany	5
11	Poland	3

Quarterfinals
Canada	6
Denmark	4
Norway	9
Hungary	6
South Korea	6
Switzerland	3
Scotland	7
Germany	9

Semifinals
Canada	6
Norway	5
South Korea	4
Germany	6

Gold-medal game
Canada	6
Germany	5
Bronze-medal game
Norway	6
South Korea	5

=== Round of 16 ===
18 October, 9:00 am

Sheet B	1	2	3	4	5	6	7	8	Final
Denmark	1	0	2	0	1	2	2	X	8
Ireland 🔨	0	2	0	1	0	0	0	X	3

Sheet C	1	2	3	4	5	6	7	8	Final
Slovakia 🔨	0	0	0	1	0	0	X	X	1
Norway	1	2	1	0	3	2	X	X	9

Sheet D	1	2	3	4	5	6	7	8	Final
Spain 🔨	0	1	0	0	0	0	1	X	2
Hungary	1	0	1	1	2	1	0	X	6

Sheet E	1	2	3	4	5	6	7	8	Final
Canada	2	4	0	1	0	0	2	X	9
Sweden 🔨	0	0	1	0	2	1	0	X	4

18 October, 1:00 pm

Sheet B	1	2	3	4	5	6	7	8	Final
United States	0	1	0	0	1	0	0	X	2
Switzerland 🔨	2	0	1	1	0	2	1	X	7

Sheet C	1	2	3	4	5	6	7	8	Final
Germany 🔨	1	1	0	0	1	0	0	2	5
Poland	0	0	0	2	0	1	0	0	3

Sheet D	1	2	3	4	5	6	7	8	Final
Russia	0	1	0	0	0	0	X	X	1
South Korea 🔨	0	0	6	1	1	1	X	X	9

Sheet E	1	2	3	4	5	6	7	8	Final
Scotland 🔨	0	2	0	2	1	1	0	X	6
Turkey	1	0	1	0	0	0	1	X	3

=== Quarterfinals ===
18 October, 7:00 pm

Sheet B	1	2	3	4	5	6	7	8	Final
Scotland	0	2	0	3	0	0	2	0	7
Germany 🔨	1	0	3	0	2	1	0	2	9

Sheet C	1	2	3	4	5	6	7	8	Final
South Korea	0	0	2	0	0	0	0	4	6
Switzerland 🔨	0	2	0	0	0	1	0	0	3

Sheet D	1	2	3	4	5	6	7	8	Final
Canada 🔨	2	0	1	0	0	2	0	1	6
Denmark	0	1	0	1	0	0	2	0	4

Sheet E	1	2	3	4	5	6	7	8	Final
Norway	0	2	2	0	0	2	0	3	9
Hungary 🔨	1	0	0	2	1	0	2	0	6

=== Semifinals ===
19 October, 9:00 am

Sheet C	1	2	3	4	5	6	7	8	Final
Canada 🔨	2	0	0	1	1	0	2	0	6
Norway	0	0	1	0	0	3	0	1	5

Sheet E	1	2	3	4	5	6	7	8	Final
South Korea	0	0	1	0	2	0	1	0	4
Germany 🔨	0	1	0	2	0	1	0	2	6

=== Bronze-medal game ===
19 October, 3:00 pm

Sheet B	1	2	3	4	5	6	7	8	Final
Norway	0	0	1	0	2	1	0	2	6
South Korea 🔨	0	2	0	2	0	0	1	0	5

=== Gold-medal game ===
19 October, 3:00 pm

Sheet D	1	2	3	4	5	6	7	8	Final
Canada 🔨	0	0	1	0	3	0	0	2	6
Germany	0	0	0	1	0	3	1	0	5
