= Angelina Ebauyer =

Kazakhstani curler (born 2001)

- Curler
- Born: 2 November 2001 (age 25)

Team
- Skip: Angelina Ebauyer
- Third: Merey Tastemir
- Second: Tilsimay Alliyarova
- Lead: Angelina Penyaeva
- Alternate: Kristina Rakhmanova
- Mixed doubles partner: Madiyar Korabayev

Curling career
- Member Association: Kazakhstan
- Pacific-Asia Championship: 3 (2018, 2019, 2021)
- Pan Continental Championship: 1 (2022)
- Other appearances: Asian Winter Games: 1 (2025); World Mixed Championships: 3 (2017, 2018, 2019)
Medal record
Women's curling
Representing Kazakhstan
Pacific-Asia Championships
Bronze medal – third place	2021 Almaty

Angelina Ebauyer (Kazakh: Ангелина Эбауэр; born 2 November 2001) is a Kazakhstani female curler and curling coach. Ebauyer is currently the skip of the Kazakhstan women's national curling team, and has represented Kazakhstan in multiple women's world-level championships, including in three Pacific-Asia Curling Championships, two Pan Continental Curling Championships (in both A and B Division), three World Mixed Curling Championships, and at the 2025 Asian Winter Games.

== Teams and events ==
=== Women's ===
Season	Skip	Third	Second	Lead	Alternate	Coach	Events
2017–18	Sitora Alliyarova	Zarema Abdykadyrova	Anastassiya Spirikova	Angelina Ebauyer	Viktoriya Pak	Viktor Kim	WJBCC 2018 (13th)
2018–19	Sitora Alliyarova	Anastassiya Spirikova	Angelina Ebauyer	Regina Ebauyer	Yekaterina Kolykhalova	Viktor Kim	PACC 2018 (5th)
2018–19	Sitora Alliyarova	Anastassiya Spirikova	Angelina Ebauyer	Yekaterina Kolykhalova	Regina Ebauyer	Viktor Kim	WJBCC 2019 (Jan) (13th)
2019–20	Sitora Alliyarova	Anastassiya Spirikova	Angelina Ebauyer	Yekaterina Kolykhalova	Tilsimay Alliyarova	Erkki Lill	PACC 2019 (7th)
2019–20	Sitora Alliyarova	Anastassiya Spirikova	Angelina Ebauyer	Yekaterina Kolykhalova	Tilsimay Alliyarova	Viktor Kim, Erkki Lill	WJBCC 2019 (Dec) (9th)
2021–22	Sitora Alliyarova (fourth)	Angelina Ebauyer (skip)	Tilsimay Alliyarova	Akgul Kumar	Regina Ebauyer	Erkki Lill	PreOQE 2021 (5th)
2021–22	Angelina Ebauyer	Sitora Alliyarova	Tilsimay Alliyarova	Regina Ebauyer	Ayazhan Zhumabek	Erkki Lill	PACC 2021 (bronze)
2022–23	Yekaterina Kolykhalova (Fourth)	Angelina Ebauyer (Skip)	Tilsimay Alliyarova	Regina Ebauyer	Merey Tastemir		PCCC 2022 (7th)
2024–25	Tilsimay Alliyarova (Fourth)	Yekaterina Kolykhalova	Angelina Ebauyer (Skip)	Merey Tastemir	Yana Ebauyer	Anton Batugin	PCCC 2024 B Division (bronze); AWG 2025 (4th)
2025–26	Merey Tastemir (Fourth)	Angelina Ebauyer (Skip)	Tilsimay Alliyarova	Angelina Penyaeva	Kristina Rakhmanova	Dmitriy Garagul	PCCC 2025 B Division (silver)

=== Mixed ===
Season	Skip	Third	Second	Lead	Coach	Events
2017–18	Viktor Kim	Sitora Alliyarova	Abylaikhan Zhuzbay	Angelina Ebauyer	Muzdybay Kudaibergenov	WMxCC 2017 (35th)
2018–19	Viktor Kim	Sitora Alliyarova	Abylaikhan Zhuzbay	Angelina Ebauyer	Roman Kazimirchik	WMxCC 2018 (34th)
2019–20	Viktor Kim	Sitora Alliyarova	Abylaikhan Zhuzbay	Angelina Ebauyer		WMxCC 2019 (19th)

=== Mixed doubles ===
Season	Male	Female	Coach	Events
2021–22	Angelina Ebauyer	Madiyar Korabayev	Erkki Lill	PreOQE 2021 (4th)

== Record as a coach of national teams ==
Year	Tournament, event	National team	Place
2019	2019 World Senior Curling Championships	Kazakhstan (senior men)	20
