= Abylaikhan Zhuzbay =

Kazakhstani curler (born 1993)

Abylaihan Jüzbai
- Curler
- Born: 18 November 1993 (age 33)

Team
- Skip: Abylaikhan Zhuzbay
- Third: Adil Zhumagozha
- Second: Aidos Alliyar
- Lead: Dmitriy Garagul
- Alternate: Ibragim Tastemir
- Mixed doubles partner: Sitora Alliyarova
- Coach: Angelina Ebauyer

Curling career
- Member Association: Kazakhstan
- World Mixed Doubles Championship: 2 (2018, 2019)
- Pacific-Asia Championship: 6 (2014, 2015, 2016, 2017, 2018, 2019)
- Other appearances: Asian Winter Games: 2 (2017, 2025); World Mixed Curling Championship: 5 (2015, 2016, 2017, 2018, 2024); Winter Universiade: 1 (2017)
Medal record
Men's curling
Representing Kazakhstan

Abylaihan Dosjanūly Jüzbai (Note: Often transliterated as Abylaikhan Doszhanuly Zhuzbay through a Russified Romanization of Абылайхан Досжанулы Жузбай.) (Kazakh: Абылайхан Досжанұлы Жүзбай; born 18 November 1993) is a Kazakhstani male curler. He is currently the skip of the Kazakhstan men's national curling team, and has represented Kazakhstan in multiple world-level championships, including the Pacific-Asia Curling Championships, Pan Continental Curling Championships, World Mixed Doubles Curling Championship, World Mixed Curling Championship, the 2017 Winter Universiade, and at the 2017 and 2025 editions of the Asian Winter Games.

Zhuzbay originally retired in 2020, but came back in 2025 to lead the national team at the 2025 Asian Winter Games.

== Teams and events ==
=== Men's ===
Season	Skip	Third	Second	Lead	Alternate	Coach	Events
2014–15	Aleksandr Orlov (fourth)	Viktor Kim (skip)	Ilya Kuznetsov	Muzdybay Kudaibergenov	Abylaikhan Zhuzbay	Viktor Kim	PACC 2014 (7th)
2015–16	Viktor Kim	Abylaikhan Zhuzbay	Daniel Kim	Muzdybay Kudaibergenov	Abilay Nurumbetov		PACC 2015 (7th)
2016–17	Viktor Kim	Abylaikhan Zhuzbay	Muzdybay Kudaibergenov	Dmitriy Garagul	Renas Akhmad	Viktor Kim	PACC 2016 (8th)
2016–17	Daniel Kim	Abylaikhan Zhuzbay	Dmitriy Garagul	Renas Akhmad	Tamerlan Irgebay	Viktor Kim	WUG 2017 (10th)
2016–17	Viktor Kim	Abylaikhan Zhuzbay	Dmitriy Garagul	Muzdybay Kudaibergenov	Abilay Nurumbetov	Roman Kazimirchik	AWG 2017 (5th)
2017–18	Viktor Kim	Abylaikhan Zhuzbay	Joan Akhmad	Dinislam Aimishev		Viktor Kim	PACC 2017 (9th)
2018–19	Abylaikhan Zhuzbay (Fourth)	Viktor Kim (Skip)	Roman Kazimirchik	Muzdybay Kudaibergenov	Azizbek Nadirbayev	Sitora Alliyarova	PACC 2018 (8th)
2024–25	Abylaikhan Zhuzbay	Madiyar Korabayev	Aidos Alliyar	Ibragim Tastemir	Arman Irjanov	Anton Batugin	PCCC 2024 B-Division (silver)
2024–25	Abylaikhan Zhuzbay	Aidos Alliyar	Adil Zhumagozha	Yermek Mussainov	Arman Irjanov	Anton Batugin	AWG 2025 (6th)
2025–26	Abylaikhan Zhuzbay	Adil Zhumagozha	Aidos Alliyar	Dmitriy Garagul	Ibragim Tastemir	Angelina Ebauyer	PCCC 2025 B-Division (silver)
2026–27	Abylaikhan Zhuzbay	Adil Zhumagozha	Aidos Alliyar	Madiyar Korabayev	Dmitriy Garagul	Andrey Semenov	2026 World Qualifier (12th)

=== Mixed ===
Season	Skip	Third	Second	Lead	Coach	Events
2015–16	Viktor Kim	Olga Ten	Abylaikhan Zhuzbay	Nargiz Issayeva		WMxCC 2015 (36th)
2016–17	Viktor Kim	Olga Ten	Abylaikhan Zhuzbay	Anastassya Surgay		WMxCC 2016 (34th)
2017–18	Viktor Kim	Sitora Alliyarova	Abylaikhan Zhuzbay	Angelina Ebauyer	Muzdybay Kudaibergenov	WMxCC 2017 (35th)
2018–19	Viktor Kim	Sitora Alliyarova	Abylaikhan Zhuzbay	Angelina Ebauyer	Roman Kazimirchik	WMxCC 2018 (34th)
2019–20	Viktor Kim	Sitora Alliyarova	Abylaikhan Zhuzbay	Angelina Ebauyer		WMxCC 2019 (19th)
2024–25	Abylaikhan Zhuzbay	Tilsimay Alliyarova	Aidos Alliyar	Merey Tastemir		WMxCC 2024 (9th)

=== Mixed doubles ===
Season	Male	Female	Coach	Events
2017–18	Abylaikhan Zhuzbay	Sitora Alliyarova	Viktor Kim	WMDCC 2018 (23rd)
2018–19	Abylaikhan Zhuzbay	Sitora Alliyarova	Viktor Kim	WMDCC 2019 (25th)
