= 2017 World Mixed Curling Championship =

- Host city: Champéry, Switzerland
- Arena: Palladium de Champéry
- Dates: 6–14 October
- Winner: Scotland
- Skip: Grant Hardie
- Third: Rhiann Macleod
- Second: Billy Morton
- Lead: Barbara McFarlane
- Finalist: Canada

The 2017 World Mixed Curling Championship was held from 6 to 14 October at the Palladium de Champéry in Champéry, Switzerland.

== Teams ==
=== Group A ===
Croatia	Estonia	Hungary	Wales
Fourth: Alen Cadez; Third: Iva Penava; Second: Drazen Cutic; Lead: Anita Sajfar	Fourth: Andres Jakobson; Third: Margit Peebo; Second: Tarmo Vaehesoo; Lead: Marcella Tammes	Fourth: Gergely Szabo; Third: Blanka Pathy-Dencsoe; Second: David Balazs; Lead: Orsolya Toth-Csoesz	Fourth: Adrian Meikle; Third: Dawn Watson; Second: Andrew Tanner; Lead: Laura Beever
Japan	Russia	Slovenia	
Fourth: Ayato Sasaki; Third: Mika Okuyama; Second: Nobuaki Yamaguchi (Skip); Lead: Chiharu Meguro	Fourth: Alexey Stukalskiy; Third: Mariia Ermeichuk; Second: Oleg Krasikov; Lead: Margarita Evdokimova	Fourth: Jure Culic; Third: Ajda Zavrtanik Drglin; Second: Gregor Verbinc; Lead: Lea Tehovnik	

=== Group B ===
Belarus	Brazil	China	France
Fourth: Pavel Petrov; Third: Polina Petrova; Second: Mikalai Kryshtopa; Lead: Evgeniya Orlis	Fourth: Marcello Cabral de Mello; Third: Aline Goncalves; Second: Sergio Mitsuo Vilela; Lead: Luciana Barrella	Fourth: Liu Sijia; Third: Ling Zhi; Second: Han Yu; Lead: Wang Weihaoping	Fourth: Stephane Vergnaud; Third: Allison Brageul; Second: Laurent Vergnaud; Lead: Celine Lagree
Latvia	Sweden	United States	
Fourth: Janis Rudzitis; Third: Jelena Rudzite; Second: Ritvars Graumanis; Lead: Dace Spilnere-Pucina	Fourth: Patric Mabergs; Third: Isabella Wranå (Skip); Second: Johannes Patz; Lead: Sofia Mabergs	Fourth: Hunter Clawson; Third: Emily Anderson; Second: Caleb Clawson; Lead: Lexi Lanigan	

=== Group C ===
Spain	Denmark	Ireland	Kazakhstan
Fourth: Sergio Vez; Third: Oihane Otaegi; Second: Mikel Unanue; Lead: Leire Otaegi	Fourth: Mikael Qvist; Third: Trine Qvist; Second: Alexander Qvist; Lead: Gabriella Qvist	Fourth: Alan Mitchell; Third: Jacqueline Barr; Second: Ross Barr; Lead: Claire McCormick	Fourth: Viktor Kim; Third: Sitora Alliyarova; Second: Abylaikhan Zhuzbay; Lead: Angelina Ebauyer
South Korea	Luxembourg	New Zealand	Scotland
Fourth: Kim Chi-gu; Third: Ryu Yeong-joo; Second: Jeon Jae-ik; Lead: Choi Soo-yeon	Fourth: Alex Benoy; Third: Karen Wauters; Second: Marc Husi; Lead: Susi Benoy	Fourth: Thivya Jeyaranjan; Third: Anton Hood; Second: Brittany Taylor; Lead: Dean Fotti	Fourth: Grant Hardie; Third: Rhiann Macleod; Second: Billy Morton; Lead: Barbara McFarlane

=== Group D ===
Austria	Czech Republic	Finland	Hong Kong
Fourth: Andreas Unterberger; Third: Hannah Augustin; Second: Gernot Higatzberger; Lead: Celine Moser	Fourth: Jaroslav Vedral; Third: Andrea Krupanska; Second: Lukáš Klípa; Lead: Denisa Postova	Fourth: Jussi Uusipaavalniemi; Third: Laura Kitti; Second: Paavo Kuosmanen; Lead: Johanna Pyyhtia	Fourth: Jason Chang; Third: Ling-Yue Hung; Second: Derek Leung; Lead: Julie Morrison
Israel	Norway	Switzerland	Slovakia
Fourth: Adam Freilich; Third: Elana Sone; Second: Leonid Rivkind; Lead: Andrea Stark	Fourth: Wilhelm Næss (Vice); Third: Ingvild Skaga (Skip); Second: Martin Sesaker; Lead: Eirin Mesloe	Fourth: Yannick Schwaller; Third: Elena Stern; Second: Michael Brunner; Lead: Céline Koller	Fourth: Patrik Kapralik; Third: Daniela Matulova (Vice); Second: Juraj Gallo (Skip); Lead: Slavka Zubercova

=== Group E ===
Australia	Canada	England	
Fourth: Hugh Millikin; Third: Kim Forge; Second: Christopher Ordog; Lead: Helen Williams	Fourth: Trevor Bonot; Third: Jacqueline McCormick; Second: Kory Carr; Lead: Megan Carr	Fourth: Andrew Woolston; Third: Lesley Gregory; Second: Martin Gregory; Lead: Kirsty Balfour	
Germany	Netherlands	Poland	Turkey
Fourth: Andrea Schoepp; Third: Rainer Schöpp (Skip); Second: Lisa Ruch; Lead: Michael Wiest	Fourth: Danny Van Den Berg; Third: Bonnie Nilhamn; Second: Willem Van Der Steeg; Lead: Jiska Kortekaas-Bun	Fourth: Andrzej Augustyniak; Third: Adela Walczak; Second: Kasper Knebloch; Lead: Karolina Startek	Fourth: Dilşat Yıldız (Vice); Third: Alican Karatas (Skip); Second: Semiha Konuksever; Lead: Orhun Yüce

Italy(Cavullo) Withdrew

China (Sijja) Moved To Group B

== Round-robin standings ==
Key
Teams to Playoffs
Teams to Tiebreaker

Group A	Skip	W	L
Russia	Alexey Stukalskiy	6	0
Hungary	Gergely Szabo	4	2
Estonia	Andres Jakobson	3	3
Japan	Nobuaki Yamaguchi	3	3
Wales	Adrian Meikle	3	3
Croatia	Alen Cadez	1	5
Slovenia	Jure Culic	1	5

Group B	Skip	W	L
Sweden	Isabella Wranå	6	0
China	Liu Sijia	4	2
United States	Hunter Clawson	4	2
Belarus	Pavel Petrov	3	3
Latvia	Janis Rudzitis	2	4
Brazil	Marcelo Cabral de Mello	1	5
France	Stephane Vergnaud	1	5

Group C	Skip	W	L
South Korea	Kim Chi-gu	7	0
Scotland	Grant Hardie	6	1
Spain	Sergio Vez	5	2
Ireland	Alan Mitchell	4	3
Denmark	Mikael Qvist	3	4
New Zealand	Thivya Jeyaranjan	2	5
Kazakhstan	Viktor Kim	1	6
Luxembourg	Alex Benoy	0	7

Group D	Skip	W	L
Norway	Ingvild Skaga	5	2
Czech Republic	Jaroslav Vedral	5	2
Israel	Adam Freilich	4	3
Slovakia	Juraj Gallo	4	3
Switzerland	Yannick Schwaller	4	3
Hong Kong	Jason Chang	3	4
Finland	Jussi Uusipaavalniemi	3	4
Austria	Andreas Unterberger	0	7

Group E	Skip	W	L
Canada	Trevor Bonot	6	0
Turkey	Alican Karatas	5	1
Poland	Andrzej Augustyniak	4	2
England	Andrew Woolston	3	3
Germany	Rainer Schöpp	2	4
Australia	Hugh Millikin	1	5
Netherlands	Danny Van Den Berg	0	6

== Playoffs ==
1/8 Finals
1	Norway	6
16	England	5
8	Hungary	3
9	Turkey	8
5	Canada	4
12	Poland	3
4	Russia	6
13	Israel	3
3	Sweden	6
14	United States	5
6	Scotland	4
11	Spain	2
7	China	4
10	Czech Republic	6
2	South Korea	4
15	Estonia	7

Quarterfinals
Norway	6
Turkey	0
Canada	9
Russia	1
Sweden	4
Scotland	7
Czech Republic	7
Estonia	4

Semifinals
Norway	3
Canada	5
Scotland	6
Czech Republic	2

Gold Medal Game
Canada	5
Scotland	8
Bronze Medal Game
Norway	6
Czech Republic	7

=== 1/8 Finals ===
Friday 13 October, 9:00

Sheet B	1	2	3	4	5	6	7	8	Final
Israel	0	0	0	1	1	0	1	X	3
Russia 🔨	0	3	2	0	0	1	0	X	6

Sheet C	1	2	3	4	5	6	7	8	Final
England 🔨	1	0	1	0	1	0	2	0	5
Norway	0	1	0	3	0	1	0	1	6

Sheet D	1	2	3	4	5	6	7	8	Final
Poland	0	0	0	1	0	0	1	1	3
Canada 🔨	2	0	0	0	1	1	0	0	4

Sheet E	1	2	3	4	5	6	7	8	Final
Turkey 🔨	2	0	2	1	0	1	2	X	8
Hungary	0	1	0	0	2	0	0	X	3

Friday 13 October, 13:00

Sheet B	1	2	3	4	5	6	7	8	9	Final
United States	0	0	0	2	0	1	0	2	0	5
Sweden 🔨	2	0	0	0	2	0	1	0	1	6

Sheet C	1	2	3	4	5	6	7	8	Final
Czech Republic 🔨	3	0	1	0	0	2	0	X	6
China	0	1	0	1	1	0	1	X	4

Sheet D	1	2	3	4	5	6	7	8	Final
Scotland 🔨	2	0	0	1	1	0	0	X	4
Spain	0	1	1	0	0	0	0	X	2

Sheet E	1	2	3	4	5	6	7	8	Final
Estonia 🔨	1	0	0	3	0	2	1	X	7
South Korea	0	2	1	0	1	0	0	X	4

=== 1/4 Finals ===
Friday 13 October, 19:00

Sheet B	1	2	3	4	5	6	7	8	9	Final
Czech Republic 🔨	2	0	0	1	0	0	0	1	3	7
Estonia	0	1	1	0	1	0	1	0	0	4

Sheet C	1	2	3	4	5	6	7	8	Final
Scotland 🔨	2	0	2	0	1	0	2	X	7
Sweden	0	1	0	2	0	1	0	X	4

Sheet D	1	2	3	4	5	6	7	8	Final
Turkey 🔨	0	0	0	0	0	0	0	X	0
Norway	0	0	0	0	3	0	3	X	6

Sheet E	1	2	3	4	5	6	7	8	Final
Russia 🔨	0	0	0	0	1	0	X	X	1
Canada	0	3	2	2	0	2	X	X	9

=== 1/2 Finals ===
Saturday 14 October, 9:00

Sheet B	1	2	3	4	5	6	7	8	Final
Norway	0	2	0	0	0	0	1	0	3
Canada 🔨	1	0	1	1	0	1	0	1	5

Sheet D	1	2	3	4	5	6	7	8	Final
Scotland 🔨	2	2	0	2	0	0	0	X	6
Czech Republic	0	0	1	0	0	1	0	X	2

=== Final ===
Saturday 14 October, 14:00

Sheet E	1	2	3	4	5	6	7	8	9	Final
Scotland	0	1	2	1	0	1	0	0	3	8
Canada 🔨	1	0	0	0	1	0	2	1	0	5

=== Bronze final ===
Saturday 14 October, 14:00

Sheet C	1	2	3	4	5	6	7	8	Final
Czech Republic	0	0	0	0	2	0	2	3	7
Norway 🔨	0	2	2	1	0	1	0	0	6
