= 2016 Pacific-Asia Curling Championships =

- Host city: Uiseong, South Korea
- Arena: Gyeongbuk Uiseong Curling Training Center
- Dates: November 5–12
- Men's winner: Japan
- Skip: Yusuke Morozumi
- Third: Tetsuro Shimizu
- Second: Tsuyoshi Yamaguchi
- Lead: Kohsuke Morozumi
- Alternate: Kosuke Hirata
- Finalist: China (Liu Rui)
- Women's winner: South Korea
- Skip: Kim Eun-jung
- Third: Kim Kyeong-ae
- Second: Kim Seon-yeong
- Lead: Kim Yeong-mi
- Alternate: Kim Cho-hi
- Finalist: China (Wang Bingyu)

The 2016 Pacific-Asia Curling Championships were held from November 5 to 12 at the Gyeongbuk Uiseong Curling Training Center in Uiseong-eup, Uiseong County, South Korea. The top two teams from the men's tournament will qualify for the 2017 Ford World Men's Curling Championship and the top finisher will join China at the 2017 World Women's Curling Championship.

== Men ==
=== Teams ===
| Australia | China | Chinese Taipei | Hong Kong | Japan |
|---|---|---|---|---|
| Skip: Ian Palangio; Third: Jay Merchant; Second: Dean Hewitt; Lead: Derek Smith | Skip: Liu Rui; Third: Xu Xiaoming; Second: Zou Qiang; Lead: Zang Jialiang; Alternate: Zhang Tianyu | Skip: Randolph Shen; Third: Nicholas Hsu; Second: Brendon Liu; Lead: Ting-Li Lin; Alternate: Steve Koo | Skip: Jason Chang; Third: Derek Leung; Second: John Li; Lead: Teddie Leung; Alternate: Martin Yan | Skip: Yusuke Morozumi; Third: Tetsuro Shimizu; Second: Tsuyoshi Yamaguchi; Lead: Kosuke Morozumi; Alternate: Kohsuke Hirata |
| Kazakhstan | South Korea | New Zealand | Qatar | |
| Skip: Viktor Kim; Third: Abylaikhan Zhuzbay; Second: Muzdybay Kudaibergenov; Lead: Dimitriy Garagul; Alternate: Renas Akhmad | Skip: Kim Soo-hyuk; Third: Kim Tae-hwan; Second: Park Jong-duk; Lead: Nam Yoon-ho; Alternate: Yoo Min-hyeon | Skip: Peter de Boer; Third: Sean Becker; Second: Scott Becker; Lead: Warren Dobson; Alternate: Anton Hood | Skip: Abdulrahman Nabil; Third: Sadd Alfahd Ahmed; Second: Abdulaziz Almajed; Lead: Jaber Al-Othali; Alternate: Abdulrahman Mohamed Zain | |

=== Round-robin standings ===
Final standings

Key
| Teams advanced to playoffs |

| Country | Skip | W | L |
|---|---|---|---|
| South Korea | Kim Soo-hyuk | 7 | 1 |
| China | Liu Rui | 7 | 1 |
| Chinese Taipei | Randolph Shen | 6 | 2 |
| Japan | Yusuke Morozumi | 6 | 2 |
| New Zealand | Peter de Boer | 4 | 4 |
| Hong Kong | Jason Chang | 3 | 5 |
| Australia | Ian Palangio | 2 | 6 |
| Kazakhstan | Viktor Kim | 1 | 7 |
| Qatar | Abdulrahman Nabil | 0 | 8 |

=== Round-robin results ===
All draw times are listed in Asia/Uiseong Time (UTC+09).

==== Draw 1 ====
Saturday, November 5, 17:30

| Team | 1 | 2 | 3 | 4 | 5 | 6 | 7 | 8 | 9 | 10 | Final |
|---|---|---|---|---|---|---|---|---|---|---|---|
| New Zealand (de Boer) | 0 | 0 | 0 | 0 | 2 | 0 | 2 | 0 | X | X | 3 |
| Chinese Taipei (Shen) | 0 | 3 | 1 | 0 | 0 | 2 | 0 | 2 | X | X | 8 |

| Team | 1 | 2 | 3 | 4 | 5 | 6 | 7 | 8 | 9 | 10 | Final |
|---|---|---|---|---|---|---|---|---|---|---|---|
| South Korea (S. Kim) | 3 | 2 | 0 | 0 | 4 | 0 | 3 | 0 | X | X | 12 |
| Hong Kong (Chang) | 0 | 0 | 0 | 1 | 0 | 0 | 0 | 2 | X | X | 3 |

| Team | 1 | 2 | 3 | 4 | 5 | 6 | 7 | 8 | 9 | 10 | Final |
|---|---|---|---|---|---|---|---|---|---|---|---|
| Kazakhstan (V. Kim) | 0 | 0 | 0 | 0 | 0 | 1 | 0 | 0 | 1 | X | 2 |
| China (Rui) | 2 | 0 | 1 | 1 | 1 | 0 | 1 | 1 | 0 | X | 7 |

| Team | 1 | 2 | 3 | 4 | 5 | 6 | 7 | 8 | 9 | 10 | Final |
|---|---|---|---|---|---|---|---|---|---|---|---|
| Qatar (Nabil) | 0 | 0 | 0 | 0 | 0 | 0 | 0 | 1 | X | X | 1 |
| Japan (Morozumi) | 2 | 4 | 4 | 2 | 1 | 5 | 1 | 0 | X | X | 19 |

==== Draw 2 ====
Sunday, November 6, 9:00

| Team | 1 | 2 | 3 | 4 | 5 | 6 | 7 | 8 | 9 | 10 | Final |
|---|---|---|---|---|---|---|---|---|---|---|---|
| Chinese Taipei (Shen) | 0 | 0 | 0 | 0 | 1 | 1 | 0 | X | X | X | 2 |
| South Korea (S. Kim) | 3 | 1 | 2 | 0 | 0 | 0 | 2 | X | X | X | 8 |

| Team | 1 | 2 | 3 | 4 | 5 | 6 | 7 | 8 | 9 | 10 | Final |
|---|---|---|---|---|---|---|---|---|---|---|---|
| New Zealand (de Boer) | 4 | 2 | 0 | 3 | 0 | 3 | 4 | 0 | X | X | 16 |
| Qatar (Nabil) | 0 | 0 | 1 | 0 | 1 | 0 | 0 | 1 | X | X | 3 |

| Team | 1 | 2 | 3 | 4 | 5 | 6 | 7 | 8 | 9 | 10 | Final |
|---|---|---|---|---|---|---|---|---|---|---|---|
| Hong Kong (Chang) | 2 | 0 | 1 | 0 | 2 | 0 | 0 | 2 | 0 | X | 7 |
| Japan (Morozumi) | 0 | 2 | 0 | 4 | 0 | 2 | 0 | 0 | 2 | X | 10 |

| Team | 1 | 2 | 3 | 4 | 5 | 6 | 7 | 8 | 9 | 10 | Final |
|---|---|---|---|---|---|---|---|---|---|---|---|
| China (Rui) | 1 | 0 | 0 | 1 | 0 | 0 | 3 | 0 | 1 | 1 | 7 |
| Australia (Palangio) | 0 | 0 | 2 | 0 | 0 | 2 | 0 | 1 | 0 | 0 | 5 |

==== Draw 3 ====
Sunday, November 6, 19:00

| Team | 1 | 2 | 3 | 4 | 5 | 6 | 7 | 8 | 9 | 10 | Final |
|---|---|---|---|---|---|---|---|---|---|---|---|
| Japan (Morozumi) | 2 | 0 | 0 | 0 | 0 | 2 | 1 | 0 | 1 | X | 6 |
| Australia (Palangio) | 0 | 0 | 0 | 0 | 0 | 0 | 0 | 1 | 0 | X | 1 |

| Team | 1 | 2 | 3 | 4 | 5 | 6 | 7 | 8 | 9 | 10 | Final |
|---|---|---|---|---|---|---|---|---|---|---|---|
| Kazakhstan (V. Kim) | 0 | 0 | 2 | 1 | 0 | 0 | 1 | 0 | 1 | X | 5 |
| Chinese Taipei (Shen) | 2 | 1 | 0 | 0 | 2 | 3 | 0 | 1 | 0 | X | 9 |

| Team | 1 | 2 | 3 | 4 | 5 | 6 | 7 | 8 | 9 | 10 | Final |
|---|---|---|---|---|---|---|---|---|---|---|---|
| South Korea (S. Kim) | 4 | 2 | 3 | 4 | 0 | 3 | 0 | 6 | X | X | 22 |
| Qatar (Nabil) | 0 | 0 | 0 | 0 | 1 | 0 | 1 | 0 | X | X | 2 |

| Team | 1 | 2 | 3 | 4 | 5 | 6 | 7 | 8 | 9 | 10 | Final |
|---|---|---|---|---|---|---|---|---|---|---|---|
| New Zealand (de Boer) | 2 | 0 | 0 | 2 | 0 | 1 | 1 | 0 | 1 | X | 10 |
| Hong Kong (Chang) | 0 | 0 | 1 | 0 | 1 | 0 | 0 | 1 | 0 | X | 3 |

==== Draw 4 ====
Monday, November 7, 14:00

| Team | 1 | 2 | 3 | 4 | 5 | 6 | 7 | 8 | 9 | 10 | Final |
|---|---|---|---|---|---|---|---|---|---|---|---|
| Qatar (Nabil) | 1 | 0 | 0 | 0 | 1 | 0 | 0 | 3 | 0 | X | 5 |
| Hong Kong (Chang) | 0 | 3 | 2 | 2 | 0 | 1 | 1 | 0 | 0 | X | 9 |

| Team | 1 | 2 | 3 | 4 | 5 | 6 | 7 | 8 | 9 | 10 | Final |
|---|---|---|---|---|---|---|---|---|---|---|---|
| China (Rui) | 1 | 0 | 0 | 2 | 0 | 0 | 3 | 0 | 1 | X | 7 |
| Japan (Morozumi) | 0 | 0 | 1 | 0 | 2 | 0 | 0 | 1 | 0 | X | 4 |

| Team | 1 | 2 | 3 | 4 | 5 | 6 | 7 | 8 | 9 | 10 | Final |
|---|---|---|---|---|---|---|---|---|---|---|---|
| Australia (Palangio) | 1 | 0 | 0 | 1 | 0 | 1 | 0 | 0 | 0 | 0 | 3 |
| Chinese Taipei (Shen) | 0 | 0 | 1 | 0 | 1 | 0 | 0 | 2 | 0 | 3 | 7 |

| Team | 1 | 2 | 3 | 4 | 5 | 6 | 7 | 8 | 9 | 10 | Final |
|---|---|---|---|---|---|---|---|---|---|---|---|
| Kazakhstan (V. Kim) | 0 | 1 | 1 | 0 | X | X | X | X | X | X | L |
| South Korea (S. Kim) | 2 | 0 | 0 | 3 | X | X | X | X | X | X | W |

- Kazakhstan chose to forfeit their game after a disagreement over an umpiring decision.

==== Draw 5 ====
Tuesday, November 8, 9:00

| Team | 1 | 2 | 3 | 4 | 5 | 6 | 7 | 8 | 9 | 10 | Final |
|---|---|---|---|---|---|---|---|---|---|---|---|
| South Korea (S. Kim) | 1 | 0 | 2 | 0 | 0 | 1 | 0 | 0 | 1 | 1 | 6 |
| China (Rui) | 0 | 1 | 0 | 1 | 1 | 0 | 1 | 0 | 0 | 0 | 4 |

| Team | 1 | 2 | 3 | 4 | 5 | 6 | 7 | 8 | 9 | 10 | Final |
|---|---|---|---|---|---|---|---|---|---|---|---|
| Hong Kong (Chang) | 1 | 0 | 1 | 0 | 0 | 1 | 0 | 2 | 0 | 1 | 6 |
| Australia (Palangio) | 0 | 0 | 0 | 2 | 1 | 0 | 2 | 0 | 0 | 0 | 5 |

| Team | 1 | 2 | 3 | 4 | 5 | 6 | 7 | 8 | 9 | 10 | Final |
|---|---|---|---|---|---|---|---|---|---|---|---|
| New Zealand (de Boer) | 2 | 1 | 0 | 0 | 1 | 2 | 0 | 3 | X | X | 9 |
| Kazakhstan (V. Kim) | 0 | 0 | 1 | 0 | 0 | 0 | 1 | 0 | X | X | 2 |

| Team | 1 | 2 | 3 | 4 | 5 | 6 | 7 | 8 | 9 | 10 | Final |
|---|---|---|---|---|---|---|---|---|---|---|---|
| Chinese Taipei (Shen) | 4 | 2 | 2 | 5 | 3 | 4 | 1 | X | X | X | 21 |
| Qatar (Nabil) | 0 | 0 | 0 | 0 | 0 | 0 | 0 | X | X | X | 0 |

==== Draw 6 ====
Tuesday, November 8, 19:00

| Team | 1 | 2 | 3 | 4 | 5 | 6 | 7 | 8 | 9 | 10 | Final |
|---|---|---|---|---|---|---|---|---|---|---|---|
| Australia (Palangio) | 0 | 0 | 1 | 0 | 0 | 1 | 0 | 0 | X | X | 2 |
| New Zealand (de Boer) | 2 | 1 | 0 | 1 | 2 | 0 | 1 | 1 | X | X | 8 |

| Team | 1 | 2 | 3 | 4 | 5 | 6 | 7 | 8 | 9 | 10 | Final |
|---|---|---|---|---|---|---|---|---|---|---|---|
| Qatar (Nabil) | 0 | 1 | 1 | 1 | 0 | 1 | 0 | 1 | 3 | 0 | 8 |
| Kazakhstan (V. Kim) | 1 | 0 | 0 | 0 | 1 | 0 | 5 | 0 | 0 | 3 | 10 |

| Team | 1 | 2 | 3 | 4 | 5 | 6 | 7 | 8 | 9 | 10 | Final |
|---|---|---|---|---|---|---|---|---|---|---|---|
| Japan (Morozumi) | 0 | 1 | 1 | 0 | 0 | 0 | 1 | 0 | 2 | 1 | 6 |
| South Korea (S. Kim) | 1 | 0 | 0 | 2 | 1 | 0 | 0 | 1 | 0 | 0 | 5 |

| Team | 1 | 2 | 3 | 4 | 5 | 6 | 7 | 8 | 9 | 10 | Final |
|---|---|---|---|---|---|---|---|---|---|---|---|
| Hong Kong (Chang) | 0 | 1 | 0 | 1 | 0 | 2 | 0 | 1 | X | X | 5 |
| China (Rui) | 2 | 0 | 2 | 0 | 4 | 0 | 2 | 0 | X | X | 10 |

==== Draw 7 ====
Wednesday, November 9, 14:00

| Team | 1 | 2 | 3 | 4 | 5 | 6 | 7 | 8 | 9 | 10 | Final |
|---|---|---|---|---|---|---|---|---|---|---|---|
| Kazakhstan (V. Kim) | 0 | 1 | 0 | 0 | 0 | 1 | 0 | 1 | 0 | X | 3 |
| Japan (Morozumi) | 2 | 0 | 3 | 2 | 1 | 0 | 3 | 0 | 2 | X | 13 |

| Team | 1 | 2 | 3 | 4 | 5 | 6 | 7 | 8 | 9 | 10 | Final |
|---|---|---|---|---|---|---|---|---|---|---|---|
| Chinese Taipei (Shen) | 0 | 0 | 1 | 0 | 2 | 0 | 0 | 0 | 1 | 0 | 4 |
| China (Rui) | 0 | 1 | 0 | 0 | 0 | 0 | 3 | 1 | 0 | 1 | 6 |

| Team | 1 | 2 | 3 | 4 | 5 | 6 | 7 | 8 | 9 | 10 | Final |
|---|---|---|---|---|---|---|---|---|---|---|---|
| Qatar (Nabil) | 0 | 0 | 0 | 1 | 0 | 0 | 1 | 0 | X | X | 2 |
| Australia (Palangio) | 5 | 2 | 2 | 0 | 4 | 2 | 0 | 2 | X | X | 17 |

| Team | 1 | 2 | 3 | 4 | 5 | 6 | 7 | 8 | 9 | 10 | Final |
|---|---|---|---|---|---|---|---|---|---|---|---|
| South Korea (S. Kim) | 0 | 0 | 2 | 0 | 1 | 0 | 1 | 0 | 2 | 2 | 8 |
| New Zealand (de Boer) | 2 | 0 | 0 | 1 | 0 | 1 | 0 | 1 | 0 | 0 | 5 |

==== Draw 8 ====
Thursday, November 10, 9:00

| Team | 1 | 2 | 3 | 4 | 5 | 6 | 7 | 8 | 9 | 10 | Final |
|---|---|---|---|---|---|---|---|---|---|---|---|
| China (Rui) | 2 | 2 | 1 | 0 | 2 | 1 | 1 | 1 | 0 | X | 10 |
| Qatar (Nabil) | 0 | 0 | 0 | 1 | 0 | 0 | 0 | 0 | 1 | X | 2 |

| Team | 1 | 2 | 3 | 4 | 5 | 6 | 7 | 8 | 9 | 10 | Final |
|---|---|---|---|---|---|---|---|---|---|---|---|
| Japan (Morozumi) | 2 | 0 | 2 | 0 | 0 | 2 | 0 | 1 | 0 | X | 7 |
| New Zealand (de Boer) | 0 | 1 | 0 | 0 | 1 | 0 | 1 | 0 | 2 | X | 5 |

| Team | 1 | 2 | 3 | 4 | 5 | 6 | 7 | 8 | 9 | 10 | Final |
|---|---|---|---|---|---|---|---|---|---|---|---|
| Chinese Taipei (Shen) | 0 | 1 | 0 | 3 | 0 | 3 | 0 | 0 | 1 | X | 8 |
| Hong Kong (Chang) | 0 | 0 | 0 | 0 | 1 | 0 | 1 | 1 | 0 | X | 3 |

| Team | 1 | 2 | 3 | 4 | 5 | 6 | 7 | 8 | 9 | 10 | Final |
|---|---|---|---|---|---|---|---|---|---|---|---|
| Australia (Palangio) | 5 | 1 | 1 | 0 | 3 | 0 | 1 | 2 | X | X | 13 |
| Kazakhstan (V. Kim) | 0 | 0 | 0 | 1 | 0 | 1 | 0 | 0 | X | X | 2 |

==== Draw 9 ====
Thursday, November 10, 19:00

| Team | 1 | 2 | 3 | 4 | 5 | 6 | 7 | 8 | 9 | 10 | Final |
|---|---|---|---|---|---|---|---|---|---|---|---|
| Hong Kong (Chang) | 2 | 0 | 0 | 2 | 0 | 1 | 0 | 2 | 0 | 3 | 10 |
| Kazakhstan (V. Kim) | 0 | 2 | 1 | 0 | 1 | 0 | 2 | 0 | 2 | 0 | 8 |

| Team | 1 | 2 | 3 | 4 | 5 | 6 | 7 | 8 | 9 | 10 | Final |
|---|---|---|---|---|---|---|---|---|---|---|---|
| Australia (Palangio) | 1 | 0 | 0 | 1 | 0 | 1 | 0 | 0 | 0 | X | 3 |
| South Korea (S. Kim) | 0 | 0 | 3 | 0 | 1 | 0 | 0 | 0 | 2 | X | 6 |

| Team | 1 | 2 | 3 | 4 | 5 | 6 | 7 | 8 | 9 | 10 | Final |
|---|---|---|---|---|---|---|---|---|---|---|---|
| China (Rui) | 1 | 1 | 0 | 0 | 1 | 1 | 0 | 0 | 3 | X | 7 |
| New Zealand (de Boer) | 0 | 0 | 1 | 1 | 0 | 0 | 0 | 1 | 0 | X | 3 |

| Team | 1 | 2 | 3 | 4 | 5 | 6 | 7 | 8 | 9 | 10 | Final |
|---|---|---|---|---|---|---|---|---|---|---|---|
| Japan (Morozumi) | 1 | 0 | 0 | 0 | 1 | 0 | 0 | 3 | 0 | X | 5 |
| Chinese Taipei (Shen) | 0 | 1 | 0 | 2 | 0 | 2 | 1 | 0 | 3 | X | 9 |

=== Playoffs ===
Semifinals
1 | South Korea | 5
4 | Japan | 6
2 | China | 11
3 | Chinese Taipei | 5

Final
4 | Japan | 5
2 | China | 3

| Bronze-medal game |
| 1 | South Korea | 8 |
| 3 | Chinese Taipei | 6 |

==== Semifinals ====
Friday, November 11, 19:00

| Team | 1 | 2 | 3 | 4 | 5 | 6 | 7 | 8 | 9 | 10 | 11 | Final |
|---|---|---|---|---|---|---|---|---|---|---|---|---|
| Japan (Morozumi) | 0 | 2 | 0 | 0 | 1 | 0 | 0 | 2 | 0 | 0 | 1 | 6 |
| South Korea (S. Kim) | 1 | 0 | 1 | 1 | 0 | 0 | 1 | 0 | 0 | 1 | 0 | 5 |

| Team | 1 | 2 | 3 | 4 | 5 | 6 | 7 | 8 | 9 | 10 | Final |
|---|---|---|---|---|---|---|---|---|---|---|---|
| China (Rui) | 5 | 0 | 2 | 0 | 0 | 3 | 0 | 1 | X | X | 11 |
| Chinese Taipei (Shen) | 0 | 2 | 0 | 1 | 1 | 0 | 1 | 0 | X | X | 5 |

==== Bronze-medal game ====
Saturday, November 12, 14:00

| Team | 1 | 2 | 3 | 4 | 5 | 6 | 7 | 8 | 9 | 10 | Final |
|---|---|---|---|---|---|---|---|---|---|---|---|
| South Korea (S. Kim) | 2 | 0 | 1 | 2 | 2 | 0 | 0 | 1 | 0 | X | 8 |
| Chinese Taipei (Shen) | 0 | 4 | 0 | 0 | 0 | 1 | 0 | 0 | 1 | X | 6 |

==== Gold-medal game ====
Saturday, November 12, 14:00

| Team | 1 | 2 | 3 | 4 | 5 | 6 | 7 | 8 | 9 | 10 | Final |
|---|---|---|---|---|---|---|---|---|---|---|---|
| Japan (Morozumi) | 1 | 0 | 0 | 2 | 0 | 0 | 0 | 0 | 2 | 0 | 5 |
| China (Rui) | 0 | 1 | 1 | 0 | 0 | 0 | 0 | 0 | 0 | 1 | 3 |

== Women ==
=== Teams ===
| Australia | China | Hong Kong | Japan |
|---|---|---|---|
| Skip: Jennifer Westhagen; Third: Lauren Wagner; Second: Kristen Tsourlenes; Lead: Stephanie Barr; Alternate: Anne Powell | Skip: Wang Bingyu; Third: Zhou Yan; Second: Liu Jinli; Lead: Yang Ying; Alternate: Mei Jie | Skip: Ling-Yue Hung; Third: Julie Morrison; Second: Ada Shang; Lead: Ashura Wong | Skip: Satsuki Fujisawa; Third: Chinami Yoshida; Second: Yumi Suzuki; Lead: Yurika Yoshida; Alternate: Mari Motohashi |
| Kazakhstan | South Korea | New Zealand | Qatar |
| Skip: Ramina Yunicheva; Third: Anastassiya Surgay; Second: Kamila Bakanova; Lead: Diana Torkina; Alternate: Sitora Alliyarova | Skip: Kim Eun-jung; Third: Kim Kyeong-ae; Second: Kim Seon-yeong; Lead: Kim Yeong-mi; Alternate: Kim Cho-hi | Skip: Chelsea Farley; Third: Thivya Jeyaranjan; Second: Emma Sutherland; Lead: Holly Thompson; Alternate: Elizabeth Matthews | Skip: Mubarkah Al-Abdulla; Third: Kholoud Al-Moukdad; Second: Reham Al-Moukdad; Lead: Lara Chakh |

=== Round-robin standings ===
Final standings

Key
| Teams advanced to playoffs |

| Country | Skip | W | L |
|---|---|---|---|
| South Korea | Kim Eun-jung | 6 | 1 |
| China | Wang Bingyu | 6 | 1 |
| Japan | Satsuki Fujisawa | 6 | 1 |
| New Zealand | Chelsea Farley | 4 | 3 |
| Australia | Jennifer Westhagen | 3 | 4 |
| Hong Kong | Ling-Yue Hung | 2 | 5 |
| Kazakhstan | Ramina Yunicheva | 1 | 6 |
| Qatar | Mubarkah Al-Abdulla | 0 | 7 |

=== Round-robin results ===
All draw times are listed in Asia/Uiseong Time (UTC+09).

==== Draw 1 ====
Sunday, November 6, 14:00

| Team | 1 | 2 | 3 | 4 | 5 | 6 | 7 | 8 | 9 | 10 | Final |
|---|---|---|---|---|---|---|---|---|---|---|---|
| Qatar (Al-Abdulla) | 0 | 0 | 0 | 0 | 1 | 0 | 0 | X | X | X | 1 |
| Japan (Fujisawa) | 3 | 2 | 5 | 1 | 0 | 5 | 4 | X | X | X | 20 |

| Team | 1 | 2 | 3 | 4 | 5 | 6 | 7 | 8 | 9 | 10 | 11 | Final |
|---|---|---|---|---|---|---|---|---|---|---|---|---|
| China (Wang) | 0 | 0 | 2 | 0 | 0 | 2 | 0 | 2 | 1 | 0 | / | L |
| South Korea (Kim) | 0 | 2 | 0 | 1 | 0 | 0 | 1 | 0 | 0 | 3 | 0 | W |

| Team | 1 | 2 | 3 | 4 | 5 | 6 | 7 | 8 | 9 | 10 | Final |
|---|---|---|---|---|---|---|---|---|---|---|---|
| Australia (Westhagen) | 2 | 0 | 4 | 0 | 1 | 0 | 6 | 6 | X | X | 19 |
| Kazakhstan (Yunicheva) | 0 | 2 | 0 | 1 | 0 | 1 | 0 | 0 | X | X | 4 |

| Team | 1 | 2 | 3 | 4 | 5 | 6 | 7 | 8 | 9 | 10 | Final |
|---|---|---|---|---|---|---|---|---|---|---|---|
| Hong Kong (Hung) | 0 | 1 | 0 | 0 | 3 | 0 | 2 | 1 | 0 | 0 | 7 |
| New Zealand (Farley) | 1 | 0 | 1 | 2 | 0 | 1 | 0 | 0 | 1 | 2 | 8 |

- The team from China ran out of time in the Extra End, and therefore forfeited the game.

==== Draw 2 ====
Monday, November 7, 9:00

| Team | 1 | 2 | 3 | 4 | 5 | 6 | 7 | 8 | 9 | 10 | Final |
|---|---|---|---|---|---|---|---|---|---|---|---|
| South Korea (Kim) | 3 | 3 | 3 | 0 | 3 | 1 | 1 | 0 | X | X | 14 |
| Hong Kong (Hung) | 0 | 0 | 0 | 2 | 0 | 0 | 0 | 1 | X | X | 3 |

| Team | 1 | 2 | 3 | 4 | 5 | 6 | 7 | 8 | 9 | 10 | Final |
|---|---|---|---|---|---|---|---|---|---|---|---|
| Kazakhstan (Yunicheva) | 0 | 2 | 1 | 4 | 4 | 1 | 2 | 4 | X | X | 18 |
| Qatar (Al-Abdulla) | 1 | 0 | 0 | 0 | 0 | 0 | 0 | 0 | X | X | 1 |

| Team | 1 | 2 | 3 | 4 | 5 | 6 | 7 | 8 | 9 | 10 | Final |
|---|---|---|---|---|---|---|---|---|---|---|---|
| New Zealand (Farley) | 0 | 0 | 2 | 1 | 0 | 0 | 0 | 2 | 0 | 2 | 7 |
| Japan (Fujisawa) | 1 | 1 | 0 | 0 | 2 | 1 | 2 | 0 | 1 | 0 | 8 |

| Team | 1 | 2 | 3 | 4 | 5 | 6 | 7 | 8 | 9 | 10 | Final |
|---|---|---|---|---|---|---|---|---|---|---|---|
| China (Wang) | 2 | 1 | 0 | 1 | 5 | 0 | 2 | 0 | 3 | X | 14 |
| Australia (Westhagen) | 0 | 0 | 1 | 0 | 0 | 1 | 0 | 3 | 0 | X | 5 |

==== Draw 3 ====
Monday, November 7, 19:00

| Team | 1 | 2 | 3 | 4 | 5 | 6 | 7 | 8 | 9 | 10 | Final |
|---|---|---|---|---|---|---|---|---|---|---|---|
| Australia (Westhagen) | 0 | 0 | 0 | 1 | 0 | 0 | 0 | X | X | X | 1 |
| South Korea (Kim) | 3 | 1 | 5 | 0 | 7 | 3 | 4 | X | X | X | 23 |

| Team | 1 | 2 | 3 | 4 | 5 | 6 | 7 | 8 | 9 | 10 | Final |
|---|---|---|---|---|---|---|---|---|---|---|---|
| Qatar (Al-Abdulla) | 0 | 0 | 0 | 0 | 0 | 0 | 0 | X | X | X | 0 |
| New Zealand (Farley) | 5 | 3 | 2 | 4 | 2 | 5 | 0 | X | X | X | 21 |

| Team | 1 | 2 | 3 | 4 | 5 | 6 | 7 | 8 | 9 | 10 | Final |
|---|---|---|---|---|---|---|---|---|---|---|---|
| Hong Kong (Hung) | 0 | 0 | 0 | 0 | 0 | 2 | 0 | X | X | X | 2 |
| China (Wang) | 2 | 1 | 4 | 4 | 3 | 0 | 4 | X | X | X | 18 |

| Team | 1 | 2 | 3 | 4 | 5 | 6 | 7 | 8 | 9 | 10 | Final |
|---|---|---|---|---|---|---|---|---|---|---|---|
| Japan (Fujisawa) | 2 | 0 | 3 | 2 | 4 | 3 | X | X | X | X | 14 |
| Kazakhstan (Yunicheva) | 0 | 1 | 0 | 0 | 0 | 0 | X | X | X | X | 1 |

==== Draw 4 ====
Tuesday, November 8, 14:00

| Team | 1 | 2 | 3 | 4 | 5 | 6 | 7 | 8 | 9 | 10 | Final |
|---|---|---|---|---|---|---|---|---|---|---|---|
| China (Wang) | 4 | 5 | 2 | 3 | 0 | 6 | X | X | X | X | 20 |
| Kazakhstan (Yunicheva) | 0 | 0 | 0 | 0 | 1 | 0 | X | X | X | X | 1 |

| Team | 1 | 2 | 3 | 4 | 5 | 6 | 7 | 8 | 9 | 10 | Final |
|---|---|---|---|---|---|---|---|---|---|---|---|
| Hong Kong (Hung) | 0 | 1 | 0 | 1 | 0 | 1 | 0 | 0 | X | X | 3 |
| Japan (Fujisawa) | 2 | 0 | 5 | 0 | 4 | 0 | 3 | 1 | X | X | 15 |

| Team | 1 | 2 | 3 | 4 | 5 | 6 | 7 | 8 | 9 | 10 | Final |
|---|---|---|---|---|---|---|---|---|---|---|---|
| Qatar (Al-Abdulla) | 0 | 0 | 0 | 1 | 0 | 0 | 0 | X | X | X | 1 |
| Australia (Westhagen) | 5 | 2 | 3 | 0 | 7 | 1 | 3 | X | X | X | 21 |

| Team | 1 | 2 | 3 | 4 | 5 | 6 | 7 | 8 | 9 | 10 | Final |
|---|---|---|---|---|---|---|---|---|---|---|---|
| New Zealand (Farley) | 0 | 0 | 1 | 0 | 1 | 0 | 0 | X | X | X | 2 |
| South Korea (Kim) | 2 | 2 | 0 | 3 | 0 | 1 | 1 | X | X | X | 9 |

==== Draw 5 ====
Wednesday, November 9, 9:00

| Team | 1 | 2 | 3 | 4 | 5 | 6 | 7 | 8 | 9 | 10 | Final |
|---|---|---|---|---|---|---|---|---|---|---|---|
| Hong Kong (Hung) | 2 | 3 | 0 | 4 | 2 | 1 | 0 | 2 | X | X | 14 |
| Qatar (Al-Abdulla) | 0 | 0 | 3 | 0 | 0 | 0 | 1 | 0 | X | X | 4 |

| Team | 1 | 2 | 3 | 4 | 5 | 6 | 7 | 8 | 9 | 10 | Final |
|---|---|---|---|---|---|---|---|---|---|---|---|
| South Korea (Kim) | 4 | 1 | 3 | 4 | 0 | 5 | X | X | X | X | 17 |
| Kazakhstan (Yunicheva) | 0 | 0 | 0 | 0 | 1 | 0 | X | X | X | X | 1 |

| Team | 1 | 2 | 3 | 4 | 5 | 6 | 7 | 8 | 9 | 10 | Final |
|---|---|---|---|---|---|---|---|---|---|---|---|
| China (Wang) | 0 | 4 | 2 | 0 | 3 | 2 | X | X | X | X | 11 |
| New Zealand (Farley) | 0 | 0 | 0 | 1 | 0 | 0 | X | X | X | X | 1 |

| Team | 1 | 2 | 3 | 4 | 5 | 6 | 7 | 8 | 9 | 10 | Final |
|---|---|---|---|---|---|---|---|---|---|---|---|
| Australia (Westhagen) | 0 | 1 | 0 | 1 | 0 | 0 | 1 | 0 | 2 | X | 5 |
| Japan (Fujisawa) | 1 | 0 | 3 | 0 | 0 | 1 | 0 | 3 | 0 | X | 8 |

==== Draw 6 ====
Wednesday, November 9, 19:00

| Team | 1 | 2 | 3 | 4 | 5 | 6 | 7 | 8 | 9 | 10 | Final |
|---|---|---|---|---|---|---|---|---|---|---|---|
| Japan (Fujisawa) | 0 | 1 | 0 | 2 | 2 | 0 | 1 | 0 | 0 | 0 | 6 |
| China (Wang) | 2 | 0 | 1 | 0 | 0 | 1 | 0 | 1 | 0 | 2 | 7 |

| Team | 1 | 2 | 3 | 4 | 5 | 6 | 7 | 8 | 9 | 10 | Final |
|---|---|---|---|---|---|---|---|---|---|---|---|
| New Zealand (Farley) | 0 | 0 | 2 | 0 | 0 | 0 | 1 | 0 | 1 | 2 | 6 |
| Australia (Westhagen) | 0 | 0 | 0 | 2 | 2 | 0 | 0 | 1 | 0 | 0 | 5 |

| Team | 1 | 2 | 3 | 4 | 5 | 6 | 7 | 8 | 9 | 10 | Final |
|---|---|---|---|---|---|---|---|---|---|---|---|
| South Korea (Kim) | 8 | 4 | 4 | 2 | 5 | 7 | X | X | X | X | 30 |
| Qatar (Al-Abdulla) | 0 | 0 | 0 | 0 | 0 | 0 | X | X | X | X | 0 |

| Team | 1 | 2 | 3 | 4 | 5 | 6 | 7 | 8 | 9 | 10 | Final |
|---|---|---|---|---|---|---|---|---|---|---|---|
| Kazakhstan (Yunicheva) | 0 | 1 | 0 | 0 | 0 | 2 | 0 | 1 | X | X | 4 |
| Hong Kong (Hung) | 2 | 0 | 4 | 5 | 1 | 0 | 4 | 0 | X | X | 16 |

==== Draw 7 ====
Thursday, November 10, 14:00

| Team | 1 | 2 | 3 | 4 | 5 | 6 | 7 | 8 | 9 | 10 | Final |
|---|---|---|---|---|---|---|---|---|---|---|---|
| Kazakhstan (Yunicheva) | 0 | 0 | 0 | 1 | 0 | 0 | 0 | X | X | X | 1 |
| New Zealand (Farley) | 0 | 3 | 1 | 0 | 1 | 1 | 5 | X | X | X | 11 |

| Team | 1 | 2 | 3 | 4 | 5 | 6 | 7 | 8 | 9 | 10 | 11 | Final |
|---|---|---|---|---|---|---|---|---|---|---|---|---|
| Australia (Westhagen) | 0 | 0 | 1 | 1 | 0 | 1 | 1 | 0 | 1 | 1 | 1 | 7 |
| Hong Kong (Hung) | 2 | 0 | 0 | 0 | 4 | 0 | 0 | 0 | 0 | 0 | 0 | 6 |

| Team | 1 | 2 | 3 | 4 | 5 | 6 | 7 | 8 | 9 | 10 | Final |
|---|---|---|---|---|---|---|---|---|---|---|---|
| Japan (Fujisawa) | 1 | 0 | 0 | 1 | 2 | 1 | 0 | 0 | 0 | 1 | 6 |
| South Korea (Kim) | 0 | 1 | 0 | 0 | 0 | 0 | 2 | 1 | 0 | 0 | 4 |

| Team | 1 | 2 | 3 | 4 | 5 | 6 | 7 | 8 | 9 | 10 | Final |
|---|---|---|---|---|---|---|---|---|---|---|---|
| Qatar (Al-Abdulla) | 1 | 0 | 0 | 1 | 0 | 0 | 0 | 0 | X | X | 2 |
| China (Wang) | 0 | 3 | 5 | 0 | 6 | 4 | 2 | 2 | X | X | 22 |

=== Playoffs ===
Semifinals
1 | South Korea | 12
4 | New Zealand | 4
2 | China | 6
3 | Japan | 3

Final
1 | South Korea | 5
2 | China | 3

| Bronze-medal game |
| 4 | New Zealand | 3 |
| 3 | Japan | 10 |

==== Semifinals ====
Friday, November 11, 14:00

| Team | 1 | 2 | 3 | 4 | 5 | 6 | 7 | 8 | 9 | 10 | Final |
|---|---|---|---|---|---|---|---|---|---|---|---|
| New Zealand (Farley) | 0 | 1 | 0 | 0 | 2 | 0 | 0 | 1 | 0 | X | 4 |
| South Korea (Kim) | 2 | 0 | 1 | 2 | 0 | 1 | 1 | 0 | 5 | X | 12 |

| Team | 1 | 2 | 3 | 4 | 5 | 6 | 7 | 8 | 9 | 10 | Final |
|---|---|---|---|---|---|---|---|---|---|---|---|
| Japan (Fujisawa) | 0 | 1 | 0 | 0 | 0 | 1 | 1 | 0 | 0 | X | 3 |
| China (Wang) | 2 | 0 | 1 | 0 | 1 | 0 | 0 | 1 | 1 | X | 6 |

==== Bronze-medal game ====
Saturday, November 12, 9:00

| Team | 1 | 2 | 3 | 4 | 5 | 6 | 7 | 8 | 9 | 10 | Final |
|---|---|---|---|---|---|---|---|---|---|---|---|
| New Zealand (Farley) | 0 | 0 | 0 | 0 | 2 | 0 | 0 | 1 | 0 | X | 3 |
| Japan (Fujisawa) | 3 | 1 | 2 | 1 | 0 | 1 | 1 | 0 | 1 | X | 10 |

==== Gold-medal game ====
Saturday, November 12, 9:00

| Team | 1 | 2 | 3 | 4 | 5 | 6 | 7 | 8 | 9 | 10 | Final |
|---|---|---|---|---|---|---|---|---|---|---|---|
| South Korea (Kim) | 0 | 0 | 0 | 1 | 0 | 2 | 0 | 2 | 0 | X | 5 |
| China (Wang) | 0 | 1 | 0 | 0 | 1 | 0 | 1 | 0 | 0 | X | 3 |
