= Jason Chang (curler) =

Hong Kong curler (born 1982)

- Curler
- Born: May 25, 1982 (age 44)

Team
- Skip: Jason Chang
- Third: Martin Yan
- Second: Ching Nam Cheng
- Lead: Cheuk Hei Chung
- Alternate: Chi Lap Ma

Curling career
- Member Association: Hong Kong
- World Mixed Doubles Championship: 2 (2018, 2019)
- World Mixed Championship: 6 (2017, 2018, 2019, 2022, 2023, 2024)
- Pacific-Asia Championship: 5 (2016, 2017, 2018, 2019, 2021)
- Pan Continental Championship: 3 (2022, 2023, 2024)
- Other appearances: Asian Winter Games: 1 (2025)

Jason Chang (born May 25, 1982) is a Hong Kong curler, and is the current skip of the Hong Kong national men's team. Chang has represented Hong Kong as a skip of the national men's team in five Pacific-Asia Curling Championships (PACC), as well as the B-Division at the Pan Continental Curling Championships, which has replaced the PACC and includes teams from Pacific-Asia, the Americas, and Africa. Chang also skipped the Hong Kong men's team at their first appearance at the 2025 Asian Winter Games.

Chang has twice competed at the World Mixed Doubles Curling Championship with partner Ling-Yue Hung. The pair finished 27th at the 2018 World Mixed Doubles Curling Championship and 38th at the 2019 World Mixed Doubles Curling Championship. He has competed six times at the World Mixed Curling Championship.

== Teammates ==
Event	Skip	Third	Second	Lead	Alternate	Result
2016 PACC	Jason Chang	Derek Leung	John Li	Teddie Leung	Martin Yan	3–5 (6th)
2017 PACC	Jason Chang	Derek Leung	Teddie Leung	Martin Yan	John Li	1–7 (7th)
2017 WMxCC	Jason Chang	Ling-Yue Hung	Derek Leung	Julie Morrison		3–4
2018 WMDCC	Jason Chang	Ling-Yue Hung				2–5
2018 WMxCC	Jason Chang	Ling-Yue Hung	Martin Yan	Ashura Wong		3–5
2018 PACC	Jason Chang	Derek Leung	Justin Chen	Martin Yan	Teddie Leung	3–5 (6th)
2019 WMDCC	Jason Chang	Ling-Yue Hung				1–6
2019 WMxCC	Jason Chang	Ling-Yue Hung	Martin Yan	Ashura Wong		4–3
2019 PACC	Jason Chang	Justin Chen	Martin Yan	Woody Cheng	Kelvin Cheung	1–8 (9th)
2021 PACC	Jason Chang	Justin Chen	Woody Cheng	Harry Yew		3–3 (5th)
2022 PCCC B	Jason Chang	Justin Chen	Martin Yan	Woody Cheng		8–1 (bronze)
2023 PCCC B	Jason Chang	Martin Yan	Woody Cheng	Jacky Chung	Ronnie Ma	6–3 (bronze)
2024 PCCC B	Jason Chang	Martin Yan	Woody Cheng	Jacky Chung	Ronnie Ma	6–3 (bronze)
2025 AWG	Jason Chang	Martin Yan	Woody Cheng	Jacky Chung	Ronnie Ma	5–3 (4th)
