= Ling-Yue Hung =

Hong Kong curler (born 1964)

- Curler
- Born: November 10, 1964 (age 62)

Team
- Curling club: Rideau CC, Ottawa, ON
- Skip: Ling-Yue Hung
- Third: Wing In Ada Shang
- Second: Pianpian Hu
- Lead: Yuen Ting Wong
- Alternate: Ka Chan
- Mixed doubles partner: Martin Yan

Curling career
- Member Association: Hong Kong; Ontario
- World Mixed Doubles Championship: 2 (2018, 2019)
- World Mixed Championship: 6 (2017, 2018, 2019, 2022, 2023, 2024)
- Pacific-Asia Championship: 5 (2016, 2017, 2018, 2019, 2021)
- Pan Continental Championship: 2 (2022, 2023)
- World Senior Curling Championship: 3 (2023, 2024, 2025)
- Other appearances: Asian Winter Games: 1 (2025)

Ling-Yue Hung (born 10 November 1964) is a Hong Kong curler. She has competed at the 2016 Pacific-Asia Curling Championships where she finished with a 2–5 record, and the 2017 Pacific-Asia Curling Championships where she finished in fourth place with a 3–7 record. In 2018 she competed at the 2018 Pacific-Asia Curling Championships where she finished 4th and advanced to the 2019 World Qualification Event. At the 2019 Pacific-Asia Curling Championships she again finished 4th and qualified to advance to the 2020 World Qualification Event but the team decided not to attend. She competed in the 2017, 2018 and 2019 World Mixed Curling Championships and the 2018 and 2019 World Mixed Doubles Curling Championships.

She curls out of the Rideau Curling Club in Ottawa.

== Teams ==
Event	Skip	Third	Second	Lead	Alternate	Result
2016 PACC	Ling-Yue Hung	Julie Morrison	Ada Shang	Ashura Wong		6th (2–5)
2017 PACC	Ling-Yue Hung	Julie Morrison	Ada Shang	Ashura Wong	Grace Bugg	4th (3–7)
2017 WMxCC	Jason Chang	Ling-Yue Hung	Derek Leung	Julie Morrison		3–4
2018 WMDCC	Jason Chang	Ling-Yue Hung				2–5
2018 WMxCC	Jason Chang	Ling-Yue Hung	Martin Yan	Ashura Wong		3–5
2018 PACC	Ling-Yue Hung	Julie Morrison	Ada Shang	Ashura Wong	Grace Bugg	4th (2–6)
2019 WQE	Ling-Yue Hung	Julie Morrison	Ada Shang	Ashura Wong	Grace Bugg	2–5
2019 WMDCC	Jason Chang	Ling-Yue Hung				1–6
2019 WMxCC	Jason Chang	Ling-Yue Hung	Martin Yan	Ashura Wong		4–3
2019 PACC	Ling-Yue Hung	Ada Shang	Ashura Wong	On Na Anna Ngai	Pianpian Hu	4th (3–4)
2021 PACC	Ling-Yue Hung	Ada Shang	Ashura Wong	Pianpian Hu		4th (0–6)
2025 AWG	Ling-Yue Hung	Ada Shang	Pianpian Hu	Yuen Ting Wong	Ka Chan	6th (3–5)
