= Kim Forge =

Australian curler

- Curler
- Born: 4 May 1971 (age 55); Crossfield, Alberta, Canada

Team
- Curling club: Victorian Curling Association
- Skip: Helen Williams
- Third: Kim Forge
- Second: Ashleigh Street
- Lead: Michelle Fredericks Armstrong
- Alternate: Anne Powell

Curling career
- World Mixed Doubles Championship: 4 (2010, 2011, 2012, 2015)
- Pacific-Asia Championship: 9 (2005, 2007, 2008, 2009, 2010, 2012, 2013, 2014, 2017)
- Other appearances: World Mixed Curling Championship: 3 (2015, 2016, 2017), World Senior Curling Championships: 1 (2024)

Kim Forge (born 4 May 1971 in Crossfield, Alberta, Canada) is an Australian female curler originally from Canada.

Originally from Alberta, Forge went to Australia at early 2000s on a teaching exchange program and never moved back to Canada.

She has been the President of the Australian Curling Federation since 2015 and in 2016 was named to the World Curling Federation Athletes Commission.

As a curler, Forge has represented Australia at four World Mixed Doubles Championships, nine Pacific-Asia Championships and at three World Mixed Curling Championships.

== Teams and events ==
=== Women's ===
| Season | Skip | Third | Second | Lead | Alternate | Coach | Events |
|---|---|---|---|---|---|---|---|
| 2005–06 | Helen Wright | Kim Forge | Sandy Gagnon | Lyn Gill | Cherie Curtis | | PCC 2005 (6th) |
| 2007–08 | Kim Forge | Sandy Gagnon | Lynette Kate Gill | Madeleine Kate Wilson | Cherie Curtis | | PCC 2007 (4th) |
| 2008–09 | Kim Forge | Sandy Gagnon | Lyn Gill | Laurie Weeden | Madeleine Wilson | Janice Mori, Jennifer Coker | PCC 2008 (5th) |
| 2009–10 | Kim Forge | Laurie Weeden | Lyn Gill | Madeleine Wilson | | | NZWG 2009 (5th); PCC 2009 (5th) |
| 2010–11 | Kim Forge | Laurie Weeden | Lyn Gill | Madeleine Wilson | | Janice Mori | PCC 2010 (5th) |
| 2012–13 | Laurie Weeden (fourth) | Kim Forge (skip) | Lyn Gill | Blair Murray | | Janice Mori | PACC 2012 (4th) |
| 2013–14 | Kim Forge | Sandy Gagnon | Anne Powell | Blair Murray | | Janice Mori | PACC 2013 (5th) |
| 2014–15 | Kim Forge | Sandy Gagnon | Kate Montenay | Jenny Riordan | | Gord Mountenay | PACC 2014 (5th) |
| 2017–18 | Helen Williams | Kim Forge | Ashleigh Street | Michelle Fredericks Armstrong | Anne Powell | Robert Armstrong | PACC 2017 (6th) |

=== Mixed ===
| Season | Skip | Third | Second | Lead | Coach | Events |
|---|---|---|---|---|---|---|
| 2015–16 | Ian Palangio | Kim Forge | Steve Johns | Anne Powell | | AMxCC 2015 (gold); WMxCC 2015 (29th) |
| 2016–17 | Hugh Millikin | Kim Forge | Steve Johns | Helen Williams | | WMxCC 2016 (22nd) |
| 2017–18 | Hugh Millikin | Kim Forge | Christopher Ordog | Helen Williams | James Ordog | WMxCC 2017 (26th) |
| 2018–19 | Hugh Millikin | Kim Forge | Steve Johns | Helen Williams | | AMxCC 2018 (silver) |
| 2018–19 | Hugh Millikin | Kim Forge | Steve Johns | Anne Powell | | AMxCC 2019 (gold); WMxCC 2019 (26th) |

=== Mixed doubles ===
| Season | Male | Female | Coach | Events |
|---|---|---|---|---|
| 2009–10 | Hugh Millikin | Kim Forge | Sandy Gagnon | WMDCC 2010 (5th) |
| 2010–11 | Hugh Millikin | Kim Forge | Jay Merchant | WMDCC 2011 (16th) |
| 2011–12 | Stephen Johns | Kim Forge | Darah-Lyn Provencal | WMDCC 2012 (24th) |
| 2014–15 | Stephen Johns | Kim Forge | | AMDCC 2014 (gold); WMDCC 2015 (28th) |
| 2015–16 | Hugh Millikin | Kim Forge | | AMDCC 2015 (silver) |

== Private life ==
She married with Australian farmer Rod Forge.
