= 2018 Pacific-Asia Curling Championships =

2018 athletic championship hele in Gangneung, South Korea

- Host city: Gangneung, South Korea
- Arena: Gangneung Curling Centre
- Dates: November 3–10
- Men's winner: Japan
- Skip: Yuta Matsumura
- Third: Tetsuro Shimizu
- Second: Yasumasa Tanida
- Lead: Shinya Abe
- Alternate: Kosuke Aita
- Coach: Bob Ursel
- Finalist: China (Zou)
- Women's winner: South Korea
- Skip: Kim Min-ji
- Third: Kim Hye-rin
- Second: Yang Tae-i
- Lead: Kim Su-jin
- Coach: Lee Sung-jun
- Finalist: Japan (Fujisawa)

The 2018 Pacific-Asia Curling Championships were held from November 3 to 10 at the Gangneung Curling Centre in Gangneung, South Korea. The top two men's and women's teams qualified for the 2019 World Men's Curling Championship and 2019 World Women's Curling Championship respectively. The third and fourth-placed teams qualified for the World Qualification Event, a chance to qualify for the World Curling Championships.

== Men ==
=== Teams ===
Australia	China	Hong Kong	Japan	Kazakhstan
Fourth: Dean Hewitt; Skip: Jay Merchant; Second: Dustin Armstrong; Lead: Steve Johns	Skip: Zou Qiang; Third: Wang Zhiyu; Second: Xu Jingtao; Lead: Shao Zhilin; Alternate: Jiang Dongxu	Skip: Jason Chang; Third: Derek Leung; Second: Justin Chen; Lead: Martin Yan; Alternate: Teddie Leung	Skip: Yuta Matsumura; Third: Tetsuro Shimizu; Second: Yasumasa Tanida; Lead: Shinya Abe; Alternate: Kosuke Aita	Fourth: Abylaikhan Zhuzbay; Skip: Viktor Kim; Second: Roman Kazimirchik; Lead: Muzdybay Kudaibergenov; Alternate: Azizbek Nadirbayev
South Korea	New Zealand	Qatar	Chinese Taipei	
Skip: Kim Soo-hyuk; Third: Jeong Byeong-jin; Second: Lee Jeong-jae; Lead: Lee Dong-hyeong; Alternate: Hwang Hyeon-jun	Skip: Scott Becker; Third: Simon Neilson; Second: Anton Hood; Lead: Warren Dobson; Alternate: Peter Becker	Skip: Nassar Alyafei; Third: Ahmed Al-Fahad; Second: Abdulrahman Ali-Mohsen; Lead: Abdulrahman Alyafei; Alternate: Salim Ali	Skip: Randolph Shen; Third: Nicholas Hsu; Second: Brendon Liu; Lead: Ting-Li Lin; Alternate: Henry Cheng	

=== Round-robin standings ===
Key
Teams to Playoffs

Country	Skip	W	L
China	Zou Qiang	8	0
Japan	Yuta Matsumura	7	1
New Zealand	Scott Becker	5	3
South Korea	Kim Soo-hyuk	5	3
Chinese Taipei	Randolph Shen	4	4
Hong Kong	Jason Chang	3	5
Australia	Jay Merchant	2	6
Kazakhstan	Viktor Kim	2	6
Qatar	Nassar Alyafei	0	8

=== Round-robin results ===
All draw times are listed in Korean Standard Time (UTC+09).

==== Draw 1 ====
Saturday, November 3, 18:30

Sheet A	1	2	3	4	5	6	7	8	9	10	Final
South Korea (S. Kim)	0	2	0	2	0	1	0	1	0	X	6
China (Zou)	0	0	4	0	1	0	1	0	2	X	8

Sheet B	1	2	3	4	5	6	7	8	9	10	Final
Kazakhstan (V. Kim)	0	1	1	0	0	0	0	0	2	X	4
Hong Kong (Chang)	1	0	0	3	1	1	0	1	0	X	7

Sheet C	1	2	3	4	5	6	7	8	9	10	Final
Chinese Taipei (Shen)	1	0	3	0	3	1	0	2	0	X	10
Qatar (Alyafei)	0	1	0	1	0	0	0	0	1	X	3

Sheet D	1	2	3	4	5	6	7	8	9	10	Final
Japan (Matsumura)	2	0	2	0	1	1	0	1	0	X	7
Australia (Merchant)	0	1	0	1	0	0	1	0	0	X	3

==== Draw 2 ====
Sunday, November 4, 09:00

Sheet A	1	2	3	4	5	6	7	8	9	10	Final
Kazakhstan (V. Kim)	2	0	0	1	1	1	0	1	0	0	6
Australia (Merchant)	0	1	2	0	0	0	3	0	0	1	7

Sheet B	1	2	3	4	5	6	7	8	9	10	Final
Japan (Matsumura)	2	1	0	0	4	2	3	X	X	X	12
New Zealand (Becker)	0	0	0	1	0	0	0	X	X	X	1

Sheet C	1	2	3	4	5	6	7	8	9	10	Final
Hong Kong (Chang)	1	0	1	0	0	0	1	0	X	X	3
China (Zou)	0	3	0	2	1	1	0	3	X	X	10

Sheet D	1	2	3	4	5	6	7	8	9	10	Final
Qatar (Alyafei)	0	0	1	0	0	0	0	0	X	X	1
South Korea (S. Kim)	4	1	0	0	1	1	1	3	X	X	11

==== Draw 4 ====
Sunday, November 4, 19:00

Sheet A	1	2	3	4	5	6	7	8	9	10	Final
Qatar (Alyafei)	0	1	0	0	1	0	1	0	X	X	3
Hong Kong (Chang)	3	0	2	0	0	3	0	5	X	X	13

Sheet B	1	2	3	4	5	6	7	8	9	10	Final
South Korea (S. Kim)	0	2	0	0	2	2	0	1	0	X	7
Australia (Merchant)	0	0	1	0	0	0	1	0	1	X	3

Sheet C	1	2	3	4	5	6	7	8	9	10	Final
New Zealand (Becker)	2	0	0	0	5	0	3	0	4	X	14
Kazakhstan (V. Kim)	0	1	1	3	0	1	0	2	0	X	8

Sheet D	1	2	3	4	5	6	7	8	9	10	Final
Chinese Taipei (Shen)	0	0	1	0	0	1	0	X	X	X	2
China (Zou)	2	1	0	2	2	0	2	X	X	X	9

==== Draw 6 ====
Monday, November 5, 14:00

Sheet A	1	2	3	4	5	6	7	8	9	10	Final
New Zealand (Becker)	3	0	0	1	2	0	2	0	0	X	8
Qatar (Alyafei)	0	1	1	0	0	0	0	1	1	X	4

Sheet B	1	2	3	4	5	6	7	8	9	10	Final
Hong Kong (Chang)	1	0	1	0	2	1	0	1	0	X	6
South Korea (S. Kim)	0	3	0	1	0	0	4	0	2	X	10

Sheet C	1	2	3	4	5	6	7	8	9	10	Final
Kazakhstan (V. Kim)	0	0	2	1	0	5	0	4	X	X	12
Chinese Taipei (Shen)	1	0	0	0	3	0	1	0	X	X	5

Sheet D	1	2	3	4	5	6	7	8	9	10	Final
China (Zou)	2	0	2	0	0	1	0	0	2	2	9
Japan (Matsumura)	0	1	0	2	0	0	1	1	0	0	5

==== Draw 8 ====
Tuesday, November 6, 08:00

Sheet A	1	2	3	4	5	6	7	8	9	10	Final
Chinese Taipei (Shen)	1	1	0	0	0	1	1	0	0	X	4
South Korea (S. Kim)	0	0	3	1	3	0	0	2	2	X	11

Sheet B	1	2	3	4	5	6	7	8	9	10	Final
China (Zou)	0	2	0	2	1	0	0	4	X	X	9
Kazakhstan (V. Kim)	2	0	1	0	0	0	2	0	X	X	5

Sheet C	1	2	3	4	5	6	7	8	9	10	Final
Qatar (Alyafei)	0	0	0	1	0	1	0	X	X	X	2
Japan (Matsumura)	3	1	2	0	4	0	5	X	X	X	15

Sheet D	1	2	3	4	5	6	7	8	9	10	Final
Australia (Merchant)	1	0	0	1	0	0	0	0	1	0	3
New Zealand (Becker)	0	1	1	0	0	0	0	1	0	1	4

==== Draw 10 ====
Tuesday, November 6, 16:00

Sheet A	1	2	3	4	5	6	7	8	9	10	Final
Australia (Merchant)	0	1	0	1	0	1	0	0	X	X	3
Chinese Taipei (Shen)	1	0	1	0	3	0	3	2	X	X	10

Sheet B	1	2	3	4	5	6	7	8	9	10	Final
Qatar (Alyafei)	0	0	0	1	0	0	0	X	X	X	1
China (Zou)	4	0	2	0	2	4	1	X	X	X	13

Sheet C	1	2	3	4	5	6	7	8	9	10	11	Final
Japan (Matsumura)	0	2	0	2	1	0	0	0	2	0	1	8
South Korea (S. Kim)	1	0	2	0	0	0	1	1	0	2	0	7

Sheet D	1	2	3	4	5	6	7	8	9	10	Final
New Zealand (Becker)	0	2	1	2	0	3	0	2	0	X	10
Hong Kong (Chang)	1	0	0	0	2	0	2	0	1	X	6

==== Draw 12 ====
Wednesday, November 7, 09:00

Sheet A	1	2	3	4	5	6	7	8	9	10	Final
Japan (Matsumura)	2	0	3	1	0	3	X	X	X	X	9
Kazakhstan (V. Kim)	0	1	0	0	1	0	X	X	X	X	2

Sheet B	1	2	3	4	5	6	7	8	9	10	Final
Australia (Merchant)	0	0	3	3	3	0	4	X	X	X	13
Qatar (Alyafei)	1	1	0	0	0	1	0	X	X	X	3

Sheet C	1	2	3	4	5	6	7	8	9	10	Final
South Korea (S. Kim)	0	1	2	0	1	0	0	2	0	0	6
New Zealand (Becker)	2	0	0	2	0	1	0	0	2	1	8

Sheet D	1	2	3	4	5	6	7	8	9	10	Final
Hong Kong (Chang)	0	0	1	0	2	0	0	0	0	X	3
Chinese Taipei (Shen)	1	0	0	2	0	2	0	2	1	X	8

==== Draw 14 ====
Wednesday, November 7, 19:00

Sheet A	1	2	3	4	5	6	7	8	9	10	Final
China (Zou)	3	0	1	0	0	1	2	0	0	1	8
New Zealand (Becker)	0	2	0	1	0	0	0	3	0	0	6

Sheet B	1	2	3	4	5	6	7	8	9	10	Final
Chinese Taipei (Shen)	0	1	0	2	0	0	1	0	1	0	5
Japan (Matsumura)	2	0	1	0	2	0	0	0	0	1	6

Sheet C	1	2	3	4	5	6	7	8	9	10	Final
Australia (Merchant)	0	0	2	0	1	0	0	1	0	X	4
Hong Kong (Chang)	1	3	0	1	0	2	2	0	1	X	10

Sheet D	1	2	3	4	5	6	7	8	9	10	Final
South Korea (S. Kim)	2	0	3	1	3	0	4	1	1	X	15
Kazakhstan (V. Kim)	0	2	0	0	0	1	0	0	0	X	3

==== Draw 16 ====
Thursday, November 8, 14:00

Sheet A	1	2	3	4	5	6	7	8	9	10	Final
Hong Kong (Chang)	0	0	1	0	0	0	1	X	X	X	2
Japan (Matsumura)	3	1	0	2	6	1	0	X	X	X	13

Sheet B	1	2	3	4	5	6	7	8	9	10	Final
New Zealand (Becker)	1	0	0	1	0	0	1	0	1	X	4
Chinese Taipei (Shen)	0	0	2	0	1	1	0	3	0	X	7

Sheet C	1	2	3	4	5	6	7	8	9	10	Final
China (Zou)	0	0	2	0	2	1	0	2	0	1	8
Australia (Merchant)	1	2	0	1	0	0	1	0	1	0	6

Sheet D	1	2	3	4	5	6	7	8	9	10	Final
Kazakhstan (V. Kim)	1	0	1	0	1	3	1	4	X	X	11
Qatar (Alyafei)	0	1	0	1	0	0	0	0	X	X	2

=== Playoffs ===
Semifinals
1	China	9
4	South Korea	6
2	Japan	8
3	New Zealand	3

Gold medal game
1	China	7
2	Japan	9

Bronze medal game
4	South Korea	9
3	New Zealand	8

==== Semifinals ====
Friday, November 9, 09:00

Sheet B	1	2	3	4	5	6	7	8	9	10	Final
Japan (Matsumura)	2	0	0	1	2	1	1	0	1	X	8
New Zealand (Becker)	0	1	1	0	0	0	0	1	0	X	3

Friday, November 9, 19:00

Sheet B	1	2	3	4	5	6	7	8	9	10	Final
South Korea (S. Kim)	0	2	0	0	2	1	0	1	0	X	6
China (Zou)	3	0	1	2	0	0	1	0	2	X	9

==== Bronze medal game ====
Saturday, November 10, 08:30

Sheet B	1	2	3	4	5	6	7	8	9	10	Final
South Korea (S. Kim)	0	1	0	1	0	2	1	0	3	1	9
New Zealand (Becker)	2	0	1	0	2	0	0	3	0	0	8

==== Gold medal game ====
Saturday, November 10, 16:30

Sheet B	1	2	3	4	5	6	7	8	9	10	Final
Japan (Matsumura)	1	0	2	2	0	0	2	1	0	1	9
China (Zou)	0	2	0	0	3	2	0	0	0	0	7

== Women ==
=== Teams ===
Australia	China	Hong Kong	Japan
Skip: Tahli Gill; Third: Laurie Weeden; Second: Lynette Gill; Lead: Kirby Gill; Alternate: Jayna Gill	Fourth: Jiang Yilun; Skip: Liu Sijia; Second: Dong Ziqi; Lead: Jiang Xindi; Alternate: Wang Rui	Skip: Ling-Yue Hung; Third: Julie Morrison; Second: Ada Shang; Lead: Ashura Wong; Alternate: Grace Bugg	Skip: Satsuki Fujisawa; Third: Chinami Yoshida; Second: Yumi Suzuki; Lead: Yurika Yoshida; Alternate: Kotomi Ishizaki
Kazakhstan	South Korea	Qatar	
Skip: Sitora Alliyarova; Third: Anastassiya Spirikova; Second: Angelina Ebauyer; Lead: Regina Ebauyer; Alternate: Yekaterina Kolykhalova	Skip: Kim Min-ji; Third: Kim Hye-rin; Second: Yang Tae-i; Lead: Kim Su-jin	Skip: Mabarka Al-Abdulla; Third: Lara Shaikhahmed; Second: Sara Al-Qaet; Lead: Amna Al-Qaet	

=== Round-robin standings ===
Key
Teams to Playoffs

Country	Skip	W	L
Japan	Satsuki Fujisawa	6	0
China	Jiang Yilun	5	1
South Korea	Kim Min-ji	4	2
Hong Kong	Ling-Yue Hung	2	4
Australia	Tahli Gill	2	4
Kazakhstan	Sitora Alliyarova	2	4
Qatar	Mabarka Al-Abdulla	0	6

=== Round-robin results ===
All draw times are listed in Korean Standard Time (UTC+09).

==== Draw 3 ====
Sunday, November 4, 14:00

Sheet A	1	2	3	4	5	6	7	8	9	10	11	Final
China (Jiang)	1	0	0	2	0	1	0	0	0	1	1	6
South Korea (Kim)	0	2	1	0	0	0	0	2	0	0	0	5

Sheet C	1	2	3	4	5	6	7	8	9	10	Final
Qatar (Al-Abdulla)	0	0	0	0	1	0	0	0	1	X	2
Hong Kong (Hung)	2	2	4	1	0	3	1	3	0	X	16

Sheet D	1	2	3	4	5	6	7	8	9	10	Final
Japan (Fujisawa)	5	5	4	1	4	1	X	X	X	X	20
Australia (Gill)	0	0	0	0	0	0	X	X	X	X	0

==== Draw 5 ====
Monday, November 5, 09:00

Sheet A	1	2	3	4	5	6	7	8	9	10	Final
Japan (Fujisawa)	0	6	0	0	4	3	X	X	X	X	13
Kazakhstan (Alliyarova)	1	0	1	1	0	0	X	X	X	X	3

Sheet B	1	2	3	4	5	6	7	8	9	10	Final
Qatar (Al-Abdulla)	0	0	0	0	0	0	0	0	X	X	0
China (Jiang)	4	4	2	3	1	1	6	4	X	X	25

Sheet C	1	2	3	4	5	6	7	8	9	10	Final
South Korea (Kim)	1	1	0	1	0	1	0	4	1	X	9
Australia (Gill)	0	0	1	0	1	0	1	0	0	X	3

==== Draw 7 ====
Monday, November 5, 19:00

Sheet B	1	2	3	4	5	6	7	8	9	10	Final
China (Jiang)	2	1	2	1	1	1	1	X	X	X	9
Kazakhstan (Alliyarova)	0	0	0	0	0	0	0	X	X	X	0

Sheet C	1	2	3	4	5	6	7	8	9	10	Final
Hong Kong (Hung)	0	0	0	0	0	2	0	X	X	X	2
Japan (Fujisawa)	3	0	3	1	3	0	2	X	X	X	12

Sheet D	1	2	3	4	5	6	7	8	9	10	Final
South Korea (Kim)	2	2	4	1	4	3	X	X	X	X	16
Qatar (Al-Abdulla)	0	0	0	0	0	0	X	X	X	X	0

==== Draw 9 ====
Tuesday, November 6, 12:00

Sheet A	1	2	3	4	5	6	7	8	9	10	Final
Hong Kong (Hung)	0	2	0	0	1	0	0	X	X	X	3
China (Jiang)	3	0	2	1	0	1	5	X	X	X	12

Sheet B	1	2	3	4	5	6	7	8	9	10	Final
Australia (Gill)	0	1	0	0	1	0	2	5	0	2	11
Qatar (Al-Abdulla)	2	0	1	0	0	1	0	0	2	0	6

Sheet D	1	2	3	4	5	6	7	8	9	10	Final
Kazakhstan (Alliyarova)	1	0	1	0	1	0	0	1	X	X	4
South Korea (Kim)	0	3	0	3	0	5	1	0	X	X	12

==== Draw 11 ====
Tuesday, November 6, 20:00

Sheet A	1	2	3	4	5	6	7	8	9	10	Final
Qatar (Al-Abdulla)	0	1	0	0	0	0	X	X	X	X	1
Japan (Fujisawa)	3	0	5	4	2	5	X	X	X	X	19

Sheet C	1	2	3	4	5	6	7	8	9	10	Final
Australia (Gill)	0	0	0	0	0	1	X	X	X	X	1
China (Jiang)	3	2	2	2	3	0	X	X	X	X	12

Sheet D	1	2	3	4	5	6	7	8	9	10	Final
Hong Kong (Hung)	1	0	0	2	0	2	0	0	0	1	6
Kazakhstan (Alliyarova)	0	3	2	0	1	0	1	1	1	0	9

==== Draw 13 ====
Wednesday, November 7, 14:00

Sheet A	1	2	3	4	5	6	7	8	9	10	11	Final
Kazakhstan (Alliyarova)	0	2	1	1	0	2	0	0	1	1	0	8
Australia (Gill)	3	0	0	0	1	0	3	1	0	0	1	9

Sheet B	1	2	3	4	5	6	7	8	9	10	Final
South Korea (Kim)	1	1	1	2	0	0	3	0	0	X	8
Hong Kong (Hung)	0	0	0	0	1	1	0	1	1	X	4

Sheet D	1	2	3	4	5	6	7	8	9	10	11	Final
China (Jiang)	0	1	0	1	0	0	2	0	2	1	0	7
Japan (Fujisawa)	1	0	2	0	0	1	0	3	0	0	1	8

==== Draw 15 ====
Thursday, November 8, 09:00

Sheet A	1	2	3	4	5	6	7	8	9	10	Final
Australia (Gill)	1	0	0	0	0	2	1	0	1	0	5
Hong Kong (Hung)	0	2	1	1	1	0	0	1	0	3	9

Sheet B	1	2	3	4	5	6	7	8	9	10	Final
Japan (Fujisawa)	0	3	0	0	3	0	0	0	1	X	7
South Korea (Kim)	0	0	1	1	0	1	0	1	0	X	4

Sheet C	1	2	3	4	5	6	7	8	9	10	Final
Kazakhstan (Alliyarova)	1	4	3	1	0	2	X	X	X	X	11
Qatar (Al-Abdulla)	0	0	0	0	1	0	X	X	X	X	1

=== Playoffs ===
Semifinals
1	Japan	13
4	Hong Kong	3
2	China	4
3	South Korea	7

Gold medal game
1	Japan	8
3	South Korea	12

Bronze medal game
4	Hong Kong	3
2	China	8

==== Semifinals ====
Thursday, November 8, 19:00

Sheet B	1	2	3	4	5	6	7	8	9	10	Final
South Korea (Kim)	0	1	0	3	1	1	0	0	1	X	7
China (Jiang)	0	0	1	0	0	0	2	1	0	X	4

Friday, November 9, 14:00

Sheet B	1	2	3	4	5	6	7	8	9	10	Final
Japan (Fujisawa)	2	4	1	0	2	2	2	0	X	X	13
Hong Kong (Hung)	0	0	0	1	0	0	0	2	X	X	3

==== Bronze medal game ====
Saturday, November 10, 08:30

Sheet C	1	2	3	4	5	6	7	8	9	10	Final
Hong Kong (Hung)	1	0	0	0	0	1	1	0	0	0	3
China (Jiang)	0	2	1	1	0	0	0	0	2	2	8

==== Gold medal game ====
Saturday, November 10, 12:30

Sheet B	1	2	3	4	5	6	7	8	9	10	Final
Japan (Fujisawa)	1	0	2	0	3	0	0	2	0	0	8
South Korea (Kim)	0	2	0	1	0	2	2	0	2	3	12
