= 2014 Australian Mixed Doubles Curling Championships =

- Host city: Naseby, New Zealand
- Arena: Maniototo’s Curling Ice rink
- Dates: October 2–5, 2014
- Winner: Steve Johns & Kim Forge
- Finalist: Ian Palangio & Laurie Weeden

The 2014 Australian Mixed Doubles Curling Championships were held from October 2 to 5, 2014 at the Maniototo's Curling Ice rink in Naseby, New Zealand. The winners of this championship represented Australia at the 2015 World Mixed Doubles Curling Championship.

== Teams ==
The teams are listed as follows:

Team	Male	Female	Coach	Locale
Collins / Powell	? Collins	Anne Powell		
Gagnon / Gagnon	Ian Gagnon	Sandy Gagnon		
Hewitt / Tsourlenes	Dean Hewitt	Kristen Tsourlenes		
Johns / Forge	Steve Johns	Kim Forge		
Millikin / Millikin	Hugh Millikin	Carlee Millikin		
Palangio / Weeden	Ian Palangio	Laurie Weeden		

== Round Robin standings ==
Key
Team to Gold-medal match
Teams to Tiebreakers

	Team	1	2	3	4	5	6	W	L	Place
1	Collins / Powell	*		L	L		L	1	4	4
2	Gagnon / Gagnon		*	L	L		L	1	4	4
3	Hewitt / Tsourlenes	W	W	*	L	W	L	3	2	3
4	Johns / Forge	W	W	W	*	W	W	5	0	1
5	Millikin / Millikin			L	L	*	L	1	4	4
6	Palangio / Weeden	W	W	W	L	W	*	4	1	2

=== Tiebreaker ===
A tie-breaker was played to determine the 4th and 5th placed teams resulting in Team Millikin placing 4th.

== Playoffs ==
Semifinals
1	Johns / Forge	W
4	Millikin / Millikin	L
2	Palangio / Weeden	W
3	Hewitt / Tsourlenes	L

Finals
Johns / Forge	W
Palangio / Weeden	L

== Final standings ==
Place	Team	Games	Wins	Losses
1st place, gold medalist(s)	Steve Johns & Kim Forge	7	7	0
2nd place, silver medalist(s)	Ian Palangio & Laurie Weeden	7	5	2
3rd place, bronze medalist(s)	Hugh Millikin & Carlee Millikin	8	3	5
3rd place, bronze medalist(s)	Dean Hewitt & Kristen Tsourlenes	6	3	3
5	? Collins & Anne Powell	7	2	5
6	Ian Gagnon & Sandy Gagnon	6	1	5
