= Julie Morrison (curler) =

Scottish-Hong Kong curler (born 1968)

Julie Morrison (born Julie Hepburn 21 May 1968) is a former Scottish junior and Hong Kong women's curler. As a junior she won a bronze medal at the 1989 World Junior Curling Championships.

== Teams ==
=== Scotland ===
Season	Skip	Third	Second	Lead	Events
1988–89	Carolyn Hutchison	Julie Hepburn	Katie Loudon	Julia Halliday	SJCC 1989 (gold); WJCC 1989 (bronze)

=== Hong Kong ===
Event	Skip	Third	Second	Lead	Alternate	Result
2016 PACC	Ling-Yue Hung	Julie Morrison	Ada Shang	Ashura Wong		6th (2–5)
2017 PACC	Ling-Yue Hung	Julie Morrison	Ada Shang	Ashura Wong	Grace Bugg	4th (3–7)
2017 WMxCC	Jason Chang	Ling-Yue Hung	Derek Leung	Julie Morrison		3–4
2018 PACC	Ling-Yue Hung	Julie Morrison	Ada Shang	Ashura Wong	Grace Bugg	4th (2–6)
2019 WQE	Ling-Yue Hung	Julie Morrison	Ada Shang	Ashura Wong	Grace Bugg	2–5
