= 2018 World Mixed Curling Championship =

2018 Winn Rentals World Mixed Curling Championship
- Host city: Kelowna, Canada
- Arena: Kelowna Curling Club
- Dates: October 13–20
- Winner: Canada
- Curling club: The Thornhill Club, Thornhill
- Skip: Michael Anderson
- Third: Danielle Inglis
- Second: Sean Harrison
- Lead: Lauren Harrison
- Finalist: Spain (Sergio Vez)

The 2018 Winn Rentals World Mixed Curling Championship was held from October 13 to 20 at the Kelowna Curling Club in Kelowna, Canada.

== Teams ==
Australia	Austria	Belarus	Brazil
Skip: Matt Panoussi; Third: Jennifer Westhagen; Second: Gerald Chick; Lead: Stephanie Barr	Skip: Gunter Dressler; Third: Karin Dressler; Second: Gerald Raab; Lead: Elisabeth Trauner	Skip: Ilya Shalamitski; Third: Susanna Ivashyna; Second: Yevgeny Tamkovich; Lead: Tatsiana Tarsunova	Skip: Anne Shibuya; Third: Claudio Alves; Second: Luciana Reis Barrella; Lead: Erick Santos
Canada	Croatia	Czech Republic	Denmark
Skip: Michael Anderson; Third: Danielle Inglis; Second: Sean Harrison; Lead: Lauren Harrison	Skip: Iva Penava; Third: Ivan Kvesić; Second: Anita Šajfar; Lead: Dino Šporčić	Skip: Lukáš Klíma; Third: Petra Vinšová; Second: Marek Černovský; Lead: Michaela Baudyšová	Skip: Mads Nørgaard; Third: Camilla Jensen; Second: Asmus Blædel Jørgensen; Lead: Lina Almind Knudsen
England	Spain	Estonia	Finland
Skip: Greg Dunn; Third: Lorna Rettig; Second: Jonathan Braden; Lead: Sydney Boyd	Skip: Sergio Vez; Third: Oihane Otaegi; Second: Mikel Unanue; Lead: Leire Otaegi	Skip: Andres Jakobson; Third: Margit Peebo; Second: Margus Tubalkain; Lead: Marcella Tammes	Skip: Markus Sipilä; Third: Lotta Immonen; Second: Leo Ouni; Lead: Tiina Suuripää
France	Germany	Hong Kong	Hungary
Skip: Romain Borini; Third: Sandrine Morand; Second: David Baumgartner; Lead: Manon Humbert	Fourth: Andrea Schöpp; Third: Florian Zahler; Second: Lisa Ruch; Skip: Rainer Schöpp	Skip: Jason Chang; Third: Ling-Yue Hung; Second: Martin Yan; Lead: Ashura Wong	Fourth: Dorottya Palancsa; Skip: Zoltán Palancsa; Second: Henrietta Miklai; Lead: János Miklai
Ireland	Italy	Japan	Kazakhstan
Skip: James Russell; Third: Ailsa Anderson; Second: Arran Cameron; Lead: Katie Kerr	Fourth: Lorenzo Maurino; Skip: Emanuela Cavallo; Second: Davide Forchino; Lead: Arianna Losano	Skip: Taisei Kanai; Third: Asuka Kanai; Second: Takeru Ichimura; Lead: Mone Ryokawa	Skip: Viktor Kim; Third: Sitora Alliyarova; Second: Abylaikhan Zhuzbay; Lead: Angelina Ebauyer
Latvia	Netherlands	Norway	New Zealand
Fourth: Jānis Rudzītis; Skip: Jeļena Rudzīte; Second: Didzis Pētersons; Lead: Dace Spilnere-Pūciņa	Skip: Thomas Levi Kooi; Third: Linda Kreijns; Second: Eelco den Boer; Lead: Bonnie Nilhamn	Fourth: Wilhelm Naess; Skip: Ingvild Skaga; Second: Martin Sesaker; Lead: Eirin Mesloe	Skip: Dave Watt; Third: Brittany Taylor; Second: Lorne De Pape; Lead: Glenys Taylor
Poland	Russia	Scotland	Slovenia
Skip: Michal Janowski; Third: Aneta Lipińska; Second: Sławomir Białas; Lead: Daria Chmarra	Skip: Alexander Eremin; Third: Maria Komarova; Second: Daniil Goriachev; Lead: Anastasia Moskaleva	Skip: Robin Brydone; Third: Rebecca Morrison; Second: Ross Whyte; Lead: Leeanne McKenzie	Fourth: Nadja Pipan; Skip: Tomas Tišler; Second: Maruša Gorišek; Lead: Jošt Lajovec
Switzerland	Slovakia	Sweden	Chinese Taipei
Skip: Mario Freiberger; Third: Irene Schori; Second: Sven Iten; Lead: Cornelia Freberger	Fourth: Daniela Matulová; Skip: Juraj Gallo; Second: Slávka Zubercová; Lead: Milan Moravčík	Skip: Rickard Hallström; Third: Elisabeth Norredahl; Second: Fredrik Hallström; Lead: Catrin Bitén	Skip: Randolph Shen; Third: Heidi Lin; Second: Nicholas Hsu; Lead: Amanda Chou
Turkey	United States	Wales	
Fourth: Bilal Ömer Çakır; Skip: Öznur Polat; Second: Oğuzhan Karakurt; Lead: Semiha Konuksever	Skip: Evan Workin; Third: Rachel Workin; Second: Jordan Brown; Lead: Christina Lammers	Skip: Adrian Meikle; Third: Dawn Watson; Second: Andrew Tanner; Lead: Laura Beever	

== Round-robin standings ==
Final standings

Key
Teams to playoffs

Group A	Skip	W	L
Scotland	Robin Brydone	8	0
Germany	Rainer Schöpp	6	2
Turkey	Öznur Polat	6	2
Belarus	Ilya Shalamitski	4	4
Italy	Emanuela Cavallo	3	5
Wales	Adrian Meikle	3	5
Hong Kong	Jason Chang	3	5
England	Greg Dunn	3	5
Kazakhstan	Viktor Kim	0	8

Group B	Skip	W	L
Russia	Alexander Eremin	7	1
Denmark	Mads Norgaard	7	1
Switzerland	Mario Freiberger	6	2
Finland	Markus Sipilä	5	3
Australia	Matt Panoussi	4	4
United States	Evan Workin	3	5
Ireland	James Russell	3	5
Netherlands	Thomas Levi Kooi	1	7
Brazil	Anne Shibuya	0	8

Group C	Skip	W	L
Spain	Sergio Vez	7	1
Czech Republic	Lukáš Klíma	6	2
Sweden	Rickard Hallström	5	3
Estonia	Andres Jakobson	4	4
Latvia	Jelena Rudzite	4	4
France	Romain Borini	4	4
Chinese Taipei	Randolph Shen	4	4
Poland	Michal Janowski	2	6
Croatia	Iva Penava	0	8

Group D	Skip	W	L
Norway	Ingvild Skaga	6	1
Canada	Michael Anderson	6	1
Slovenia	Tomas Tisler	4	3
Slovakia	Juraj Gallo	4	3
Japan	Taisei Kanai	3	4
Hungary	Zoltan Palancsa	3	4
Austria	Gunter Dressler	1	6
New Zealand	Dave Watt	1	6

== Playoffs ==
Qualification
8 Czech Republic	4
9 Switzerland	7
5 Canada	9
12 Slovenia	5
6 Germany	7
11 Sweden	5
7 Denmark	7
10 Turkey	8

Quarter-finals
1 Norway	6
9 Switzerland	4
5 Canada	8
4 Scotland	5
3 Spain	6
6 Germany	4
10 Turkey	2
2 Russia	11

Semi-finals
1 Norway	3
5 Canada	7
3 Spain	6
2 Russia	2

Final
5 Canada	6
3 Spain	2
Third place
1 Norway	7
2 Russia	8

=== Qualification ===
October 19, 2:00pm

Sheet A	1	2	3	4	5	6	7	8	Final
Czech Republic 🔨	1	0	0	2	0	1	0	X	4
Switzerland	0	0	4	0	2	0	1	X	7

Sheet C	1	2	3	4	5	6	7	8	Final
Slovenia	0	2	0	0	2	0	1	0	5
Canada 🔨	1	0	1	3	0	1	0	3	9

Sheet D	1	2	3	4	5	6	7	8	Final
Sweden	0	1	0	0	0	1	3	X	5
Germany 🔨	1	0	3	2	1	0	0	X	7

Sheet F	1	2	3	4	5	6	7	8	9	Final
Denmark 🔨	1	0	2	0	0	4	0	0	0	7
Turkey	0	1	0	2	2	0	1	1	1	8

=== Quarter-finals ===
Team	1	2	3	4	5	6	7	8	Final
Norway 🔨	0	1	1	1	0	0	2	1	6
Switzerland	1	0	0	0	3	0	0	0	4

Team	1	2	3	4	5	6	7	8	9	Final
Canada	1	1	1	0	1	0	1	0	3	8
Scotland 🔨	0	0	0	1	0	2	0	2	0	5

Team	1	2	3	4	5	6	7	8	Final
Spain 🔨	2	0	0	1	0	0	0	3	6
Germany	0	0	2	0	0	2	0	0	4

Sheet D	1	2	3	4	5	6	7	8	Final
Turkey 🔨	0	1	0	1	0	0	X	X	2
Russia	1	0	3	0	3	4	X	X	11

=== Semi-finals ===
Team	1	2	3	4	5	6	7	8	Final
Canada	0	2	0	1	0	2	2	X	7
Norway 🔨	1	0	1	0	1	0	0	X	3

Team	1	2	3	4	5	6	7	8	Final
Spain 🔨	2	1	2	0	1	0	0	X	6
Russia	0	0	0	1	0	1	0	X	2

=== Third place ===
Team	1	2	3	4	5	6	7	8	Final
Norway	1	0	2	0	3	1	0	0	7
Russia 🔨	0	2	0	2	0	0	3	1	8

=== Final ===
Team	1	2	3	4	5	6	7	8	Final
Canada 🔨	2	1	0	0	1	2	0	X	6
Spain	0	0	1	0	0	0	1	X	2
