= Sitora Alliyarova =

Kazakhstan curler and coach (born 1999)

- Curler
- Born: 23 November 1999 (age 26)

Team
- Skip: Sitora Alliyarova
- Third: Anastassiya Spirikova
- Second: Angelina Ebauyer
- Lead: Regina Ebauyer
- Alternate: Yekaterina Kolykhalova
- Mixed doubles partner: Abylaikhan Zhuzbay

Curling career
- Member Association: Kazakhstan
- World Mixed Doubles Championship: 2 (2018, 2019)
- Pacific-Asia Championship: 4 (2016, 2018, 2019, 2021)
- Other appearances: World University Games: 1 (2017); World Mixed Championships: 2 (2017, 2018); Asian Winter Games: 1 (2017)
Medal record
Women's curling
Representing Kazakhstan
Pacific-Asia Championships
Bronze medal – third place	2021 Almaty

Sitora Alliyarova (Kazakh: Ситора Аллиярова, Sıtora Allııarova; born 23 November 1999) is a Kazakhstani female curler and curling coach.

On the international level she played for the Kazakhstan national women's team at the 2017 Winter Universiade, in two Pacific-Asia Curling Championships (2016, 2018) and one Asian Winter Games (2017). She also played for Kazakhstan in two World Mixed Curling Championship (2017, 2018) and two World Mixed Doubles Curling Championships (2018 and 2019).

She was also the coach of the Kazakhstan national men's curling team at the 2018 Pacific-Asia Curling Championships.
