= Anne Powell =

Australian curler (born 1973)

- Curler
- Born: 20 November 1973 (age 53); Crossfield, Alberta, Canada

Team
- Curling club: Victorian Curling Association
- Skip: Jessica Wytrychowski
- Fourth: Ágnes Szentannai
- Second: Jennifer Westhagen
- Lead: Joanne Robins
- Alternate: Anne Powell

Curling career
- Member Association: Australia
- World Mixed Championship: 2 (2015, 2024)
- Pacific-Asia Championship: 3 (2013, 2016, 2017)

Anne Powell (born 20 November 1973 in Crossfield, Alberta, Canada) is an Australian female curler.

Outside of curling she is a rheumatologist and general physician, and also Director of Physician Education at Alfred Health and Director of CCS's (Central Clinical School of Monash University) Medical Education program. She did her undergraduate training at Monash University.

She started play curling in 2006 when she attended the University of Alberta in Canada doing her Research Clinical Fellowship in rheumatology.

== Teams and events ==
=== Women's ===
Season	Skip	Third	Second	Lead	Alternate	Coach	Events
2013–14	Kim Forge	Sandy Gagnon	Anne Powell	Blair Murray		Janice Mori	PACC 2013 (5th)
2016–17	Jennifer Westhagen	Lauren Wagner	Kristen Tsourlenes	Stephanie Barr	Anne Powell	Matt Panoussi	PACC 2016 (5th)
2017–18	Helen Williams	Kim Forge	Ashleigh Street	Michelle Fredericks	Anne Powell	Robert Armstrong	PACC 2017 (6th)
2018–19	Lauren Wagner	Kristen Tsourlenes	Anne Powell	Carlee Millikin			AWCC 2018 (bronze)
2022–23	Beata Bowes	Anne Powell	Katherine Hayes	Stephanie Barr			AWCC 2022 (4th)
2023–24	Helen Williams	Kim Forge	Anne Powell	Beata Bowes			AWCC 2023 (silver)
2024–25	Anne Powell	Amanda Hlushak	Nicole Hewett	Fiona Foley			AWCC 2024 (silver)
2026–27	Ágnes Szentannai (Fourth)	Jessica Wytrychowski (Skip)	Jennifer Westhagen	Joanne Robins	Anne Powell	Shannon Kleibrink	AWCC 2026 (gold); 2026 World Qualifier

=== Mixed ===
Season	Skip	Third	Second	Lead	Events
2015–16	Ian Palangio	Kim Forge	Steve Johns	Anne Powell	AMxCC 2015 (gold); WMxCC 2015 (29th)

=== Mixed doubles ===
Season	Male	Female	Events
2014–15	? Collins	Anne Powell	AMDCC 2014 (5th)
