= Viktor Kim =

Kazakhstani curler and coach (born 1955)

- Curler
- Born: 27 July 1955 (age 71)

Curling career
- Member Association: Kazakhstan
- World Mixed Doubles Championship: 2 (2016, 2017)
- European Championship: 3 (2004, 2005, 2006)
- Pacific-Asia Championship: 7 (2012, 2014, 2015, 2016, 2017, 2018, 2021)
- Other appearances: World Mixed Championships: 4 (2015, 2016, 2017, 2018); European Mixed Championships: 1 (2006); Asian Winter Games: 1 (2007); World Senior Championships: 3 (2015, 2017, 2019)
Medal record
Curling

Viktor Georgievich Kim (Russian: Виктор Георгиевич Ким; born 27 July 1955) is a Kazakhstani curler and curling coach.

== Curling career ==
On the international level, he played (almost always as skip) for Kazakhstan's national men's team at six Pacific Curling Championships (2012, 2014, 2015, 2016, 2017, 2018), three European Curling Championships (2004, 2005, 2006) and one Asian Winter Games (2007). He also represented Kazakhstan at two World Mixed Doubles Curling Championships (2016, 2017), four World Mixed Curling Championships (2015, 2016, 2017, 2018), and one European Mixed Curling Championship (2006). He competed at three World Senior Curling Championships (2015, 2017, 2019).

He was also the coach of various Kazakhstani national curling teams at many international curling tournaments.

He is the "founder of Kazakhstani curling": after he saw the curling competition at the 1998 Winter Olympics in Nagano, he founded the Kazakhstan Curling Association in 2003 and he is the Secretary General of this Association. He is a member of the National Olympic Committee of the Republic of Kazakhstan.

He started curling in 2003. His first coach was Russian curler and coach Alexander Kirikov.

In a game against Canada at the 2019 World Senior Curling Championships, Kim was suspended from the match, and was later ejected from the tournament due to an incident involving an on-ice official.

== Personal life ==
Kim is a Koryo-saram, and he lives in Kazakhstan. His son Daniel Kim is also a curler and curling coach. Viktor and Daniel played on the same team many times, for example, at the 2015 Pacific-Asia Curling Championships.
