= Prestige Hotels & Resorts Curling Classic =

- Established: 2001
- Host city: Vernon, British Columbia
- Arena: Vernon Curling Club
- Men's purse: $28,500
- Women's purse: $10,000

Current champions (2026)
- Men: (Switzerland) Marco Hösli
- Women: (South Korea) Gim Eun-ji

Current edition
- 2026 Prestige Hotels & Resorts Curling Classic

Location in Canada

The Prestige Hotels & Resorts Curling Classic is an annual curling tournament on the men's and women's curling tour. It is held at the Vernon Curling Club in Vernon, British Columbia. It was a part of the World Curling Tour until 2019 when it was discontinued. It is held at the beginning of October, with the beginning of the bonspiel sometimes occurring in September. The event has been held since 2001.

== Former event names ==
- Asham Curling Supplies / Prestige Inns Classic: 2001, 2003
- Prestige Inn & Twin Anchors Houseboats Vernon Curling Classic: 2002
- Twin Anchors Houseboats Vacations / Prestige Inn Classic: 2004
- Twin Anchors - Prestige Inn Curling Classic: 2005
- Twin Anchors Houseboat / Prestige Inns Cashspiel: 2006
- Twin Anchors Houseboat Cashspiel: 2007–2008
- Twin Anchors Invitational: 2009–2011
- Prestige Hotels & Resorts Curling Classic: 2012–present

== Past champions ==
Only skips names listed

=== Men ===
| Year | Winning skip | Runner up skip | Purse (CAD) |
|---|---|---|---|
| 2001 | (British Columbia) Rick Folk | (Manitoba) Jeff Stoughton | $36,000 |
| 2002 | (Alberta) Rob Bucholz | (British Columbia) Brent Pierce | $36,000 |
| 2003 | (Alberta) Randy Ferbey | (British Columbia) Greg McAulay | $43,500 |
| 2004 | (British Columbia) Rick Folk | (Alberta) J. D. Lind | $43,000 |
| 2005 | (British Columbia) Bob Ursel | (Quebec) Pierre Charette | $43,500 |
| 2006 | (British Columbia) Brent Pierce | (Alberta) Mark Johnson | $45,000 |
| 2007 | (British Columbia) Bob Ursel | (British Columbia) Sean Geall | $24,000 |
| 2008 | (British Columbia) Bob Ursel | (British Columbia) Sean Geall | $24,000 |
| 2009 | (Alberta) Kevin Koe | (British Columbia) Bob Ursel | $25,000 |
| 2010 | (Alberta) Kevin Koe | (Russia) Andrey Drozdov | $37,000 |
| 2011 | (Alberta) Robert Schlender | (British Columbia) Brent Pierce | $27,000 |
| 2012 | (British Columbia) Jim Cotter | (Alberta) Jamie King | $26,000 |
| 2013 | (Alberta) Kevin Koe | (United States) Brady Clark | $35,000 |
| 2014 | (British Columbia) Grant Dezura | (British Columbia) Brent Pierce | $26,000 |
| 2015 | (British Columbia) Sean Geall | (British Columbia) Dean Joanisse | $17,000 |
| 2016 | (British Columbia) Tyler Tardi | (Japan) Yusuke Morozumi | $17,000 |
| 2017 | (British Columbia) Jeff Guignard | (British Columbia) Adam Cseke | $12,000 |
| 2018 | (Saskatchewan) Matt Dunstone | (British Columbia) Jim Cotter | $18,000 |
| 2019 | (British Columbia) Tyler Tardi | (British Columbia) Jim Cotter | $18,000 |
| 2020 | Cancelled | | |
| 2021 | Cancelled | | |
| 2022 | (Japan) Riku Yanagisawa | (Japan) Kohsuke Hirata | $18,000 |
| 2023 | (British Columbia) Brent Pierce | (British Columbia) Catlin Schneider | $28,500 |
| 2024 | (China) Xu Xiaoming | (British Columbia) Brent Pierce | $28,500 |
| 2025 | (British Columbia) Jason Montgomery | (British Columbia) Cameron de Jong | $28,500 |
| 2026 | (Switzerland) Marco Hösli | (Japan) Tsuyoshi Yamaguchi | |

=== Women ===
| Year | Winning skip | Runner up skip | Purse (CAD) |
|---|---|---|---|
| 2001 | (British Columbia) Kelley Law | (British Columbia) Marla Mallett | |
| 2002 | (British Columbia) Kelly Scott | (British Columbia) Kelley Law | |
| 2003 | (Alberta) Shannon Kleibrink | (British Columbia) Penny Shantz-Henderson | |
| 2004 | (Alberta) Cheryl Bernard | (British Columbia) Kelly Scott | $15,000 |
| 2005 | (Alberta) Cheryl Bernard | (British Columbia) Kristy Lewis | $21,000 |
| 2006 | (British Columbia) Kelley Law | (British Columbia) Corrie Lubben | $21,000 |
| 2007 | (Alberta) Heather Rankin | (Alberta) Shannon Kleibrink | $29,200 |
| 2008 | (Alberta) Shannon Kleibrink | (British Columbia) Kelly Scott | $38,000 |
| 2009 | (Japan) Moe Meguro | (Alberta) Cheryl Bernard | $35,000 |
| 2010 | (Alberta) Cheryl Bernard | (Russia) Liudmila Privivkova | $35,000 |
| 2011 | (Alberta) Amy Nixon | (Alberta) Lisa Eyamie | $35,000 |
| 2012 | (Alberta) Heather Nedohin | (Russia) Anna Sidorova | $35,000 |
| 2013 | (China) Wang Bingyu | (Switzerland) Mirjam Ott | $35,000 |
| 2014 | (Japan) Ayumi Ogasawara | (British Columbia) Corryn Brown | $37,000 |
| 2015 | (Saskatchewan) Stefanie Lawton | (Alberta) Chelsea Carey | $39,000 |
| 2016 | (British Columbia) Marla Mallett | (Alberta) Cheryl Bernard | $41,500 |
| 2017 | (Ontario) Rachel Homan | (South Korea) Gim Un-chi | $41,000 |
| 2018 | (Russia) Alina Kovaleva | (Alberta) Kelsey Rocque | $41,000 |
| 2019 | (Alberta) Kelsey Rocque | (Alberta) Chelsea Carey | $31,500 |
| 2020 | Cancelled | | |
| 2021 | Cancelled | | |
| 2022 | (British Columbia) Corryn Brown | (Japan) Ikue Kitazawa | $31,500 |
| 2023 | (China) Wang Rui | (British Columbia) Corryn Brown | $28,500 |
| 2024 | (South Korea) Kang Bo-bae | (China) Zhang Yujie | $28,500 |
| 2025 | (British Columbia) Mahra Harris | (British Columbia) Sarah Wark | $10,000 |
| 2026 | (South Korea) Gim Eun-ji | (Japan) Yuina Miura | |
