= Midori Kudoh =

Japanese curler

- Curler ♀
- Other names: Minori Kudoh, Minori Kudō
- Born: April 10, 1967 (age 59); Hokkaido, Japan

Team
- Curling club: Kitami CC, Obihiro CC

Curling career
- Member Association: Japan
- World Championship: 2 (1990, 1992)
- Pacific-Asia Championship: 1 (1991)
- Olympic: 1 (1992 - demo)
Medal record
Curling
Pacific-Asia Championships
Gold medal – first place	1991 Sagamihara
Japan Women's Championship
Gold medal – first place	1989 Sapporo
Gold medal – first place	1992 Tokoro
Bronze medal – third place	1990 Sapporo
Bronze medal – third place	1991 Tokoro

Midori Kudoh (Japanese: 工藤みのり; born April 10, 1967, in Hokkaido, Japan; also known as Minori Kudoh, Minori Kudō) is a Japanese curler, a 1991 Pacific-Asian champion and a two-time Japan women's champion curler (1989, 1992).

She played for Japan at the 1992 Winter Olympics, where curling was a demonstration sport. The Japanese team finished in eighth place.

She was the skip of the Japanese women's team when they competed for the first time at the World Championship in 1990.

== Teams ==
Season	Skip	Third	Second	Lead	Alternate	Events
1988–89	Minori Kudo	Kaoru Tatesaki	Etsuko Ito	Mayumi Abe	Mayumi Kaneko	JWCC 1989 (gold)
1989–90	Minori Kudo	Mayumi Abe	Etsuko Ito	Kaoru Tatesaki	Mayumi Seguchi	JWCC 1990 (bronze)
1989–90	Midori Kudoh	Kaori Tatezaki	Etsuko Ito	Mayumi Abe	Mayumi Seguchi	WCC 1990 (10th)
1990–91	Minori Kudo	Mayumi Abe	Chieko Horishimizu	Mayumi Kaneko		JWCC 1991 (bronze)
1991–92	Midori Kudoh	Mayumi Seguchi	Mayumi Abe	Utage Matsuzaki	Rumi Michita	PCC 1991 (gold)
1991–92	Mayumi Seguchi	Midori Kudoh	Mayumi Abe	Utage Matsuzaki	Rumi Michita	WOG 1992 (demo) (8th); JWCC 1992 (gold)
1991–92	Mayumi Seguchi	Midori Kudoh	Mayumi Abe	Rumi Michita	Hidemi Itai	WCC 1992 (9th)
