= Daniel Joyce =

Australian male curler

- Curler ♂
- Born: May 17, 1961 (age 65); Winnipeg, Manitoba

Team
- Curling club: Melbourne CC, New South Wales CC

Curling career
- Member Association: Australia
- World Championship: 1 (1992)
- Pacific-Asia Championship: 1 (1991)
- Olympic: 1: (1992, demonstration)
Medal record
Curling
Pacific-Asia Championships
| Gold medal – first place | 1991 Sagamihara |

Daniel "Dan" Joyce (born May 17, 1961) is a Canadian-born Australian curler.

At the international level, he is a 1991 Pacific champion curler.

He played for Australia at the 1992 Winter Olympics where curling was a demonstration event. There, the Australian men's team finished in seventh place.

== Teams and events ==
| Season | Skip | Third | Second | Lead | Alternate | Events |
|---|---|---|---|---|---|---|
| 1991–92 | Hugh Millikin | Tom Kidd | Daniel Joyce | Stephen Hewitt | Brian Stuart (PCC, WOG) | PCC 1991 (gold); WOG 1992 (demo) (7th); WCC 1992 (6th) |
