= 2026 Prestige Hotels & Resorts Curling Classic =

- Host city: Vernon, British Columbia
- Arena: Vernon Curling Club
- Dates: October 1–5
- Men's winner: (Switzerland) Team Hösli
- Curling club: CC Glarus, Glarus
- Skip: Marco Hösli
- Fourth: Philipp Hösli
- Second: Simon Gloor
- Lead: Justin Hausherr
- Finalist: (Japan) Tsuyoshi Yamaguchi
- Women's winner: (South Korea) Team Gim
- Curling club: Uijeongbu CC, Uijeongbu
- Skip: Gim Eun-ji
- Fourth: Kim Min-ji
- Second: Seol Ye-ji
- Lead: Seol Ye-eun
- Alternate: Kim Su-ji
- Coach: Shin Dong-ho
- Finalist: (Japan) Yuina Miura

The 2026 Prestige Hotels & Resorts Curling Classic was held from October 1 to 5 at the Vernon Curling Club in Vernon, British Columbia. The total purse for the event was $28,500 on both the men's and women's sides.

For the 2026–27 season, the event was a satellite Grand Slam of Curling event. The highest ranking non-qualified team on the men's and women's sides earned a spot at the 2026 GSOC Invitational, the first Grand Slam of the season. In the men's event, the winning Marco Hösli rink from Switzerland earned the Slam berth. On the women's side, as the winners Team Gim had already qualified, Japan's Yuina Miura who finished in second qualified for the Invitational.

== Men ==
=== Teams ===
The teams are listed as follows:

Skip	Third	Second	Lead	Alternate	Locale
Tetsuro Shimizu (Fourth)	Shinya Abe (Skip)	Asei Nakahara	Haruto Ouchi	Hayato Sato	Sapporo, Japan
Cameron de Jong (Fourth)	Matthew Blandford (Skip)	Sébastien Robillard	Cody Johnston		Vancouver, British Columbia
Jim Cotter	Jared Kolomaya	Connor Deane	Erik Colwell	Brad Wood	Vernon, British Columbia
Matthew Hall	Sterling Middleton	Alex Horvath	Thomas Thierbach		Victoria, British Columbia
Philipp Hösli (Fourth)	Marco Hösli (Skip)	Simon Gloor	Justin Hausherr		Glarus, Switzerland
Daniel Humbke	Andrew Jones	Michael Dahms	Ty Parcels		Lacombe, Alberta
Cole Adams (Fourth)	Ryan Jacques (Skip)	Andrew Nowell	Adam Naugler		Edmonton, Alberta
Jeong Byeong-jin	Kim Hyo-jun	Pyo Jeong-min	Kim Jin-hun	Kim Dae-hyun	Uiseong, South Korea
Mitchell Kopytko	Cam Weir	Calder Fadden	Coburn Fadden		Kamloops, British Columbia
Richard Krell	Daniel Wenzek	Jordan Tardi	Nick Meister		Langley, British Columbia
Lee Jae-beom	Kim Min-woo	Kim San	Kim Jeong-min		Seoul, South Korea
Jacob Libbus	Nathan Molberg	Zachary Pawliuk	Michael Hendricks		Edmonton, Alberta
Takumi Maeda	Hiroki Maeda	Uryu Kamikawa	Gakuto Tokoro	Ryotaro Shukuya	Tokoro, Japan
Jordon McDonald	Jacques Gauthier	Derek Samagalski (Note: Derek Samagalski spared on Team McDonald for second Elias Huminicki.)	Cameron Olafson		Winnipeg, Manitoba
Josh Miki	Matthew Fenton	Branden Reimer	– (Note: Team Miki only played with three players.)		White Rock, British Columbia
Jason Montgomery	Chris Baier	Miles Craig	Troy Cowan		Victoria, British Columbia
Justin Nillson	David Henderson	Colorado Marr	– (Note: Team Nillson only played with three players.)		Prince George, British Columbia
Kouki Ogiwara	Hinata Michitani	Chikara Segawa	Taiki Kudo		Sapporo, Japan
Kim Schwaller	Max Winz	Andreas Gerlach	Jan Iseli		Oberwallis, Switzerland
Tyler Tardi	Colton Flasch	Kevin Marsh	Daniel Marsh		Saskatoon, Saskatchewan
Matt Tolley	Matt Duizer	Jesse Monette	Darin Gerow		Penticton, British Columbia
Evan van Amsterdam	Jeremy Harty	Jason Ginter	Parker Konschuh		Edmonton, Alberta
Jay Wakefield	Matthew McCrady	Chris Parkinson	Daniel Deng		New Westminster, British Columbia
Riku Yanagisawa (Fourth)	Tsuyoshi Yamaguchi (Skip)	Takeru Yamamoto	Satoshi Koizumi		Karuizawa, Japan

=== Knockout Brackets ===
==== A Event ====
First Knockout				Qualifier 1
(Switzerland) Marco Hösli	8
(British Columbia) Justin Nillson	1	(Switzerland) Marco Hösli	7
(British Columbia) Jay Wakefield	1	(Switzerland) Kim Schwaller	4
(Switzerland) Kim Schwaller	7			(Switzerland) Marco Hösli	5
(Alberta) Ryan Jacques	6			(Japan) Takumi Maeda	2
(British Columbia) Jason Montgomery	3	(Alberta) Ryan Jacques	8
(British Columbia) Matt Tolley	6	(Japan) Takumi Maeda	9
(Japan) Takumi Maeda	7

First Knockout				Qualifier 2
(Saskatchewan) Tyler Tardi	7
(Alberta) Daniel Humbke	6	(Saskatchewan) Tyler Tardi	5
(South Korea) Lee Jae-beom	7	(South Korea) Lee Jae-beom	7
(British Columbia) Matthew Blandford	5			(South Korea) Lee Jae-beom	4
(Alberta) Jacob Libbus	6			(Alberta) Jacob Libbus	6
(British Columbia) Josh Miki	5	(Alberta) Jacob Libbus	5
(British Columbia) Mitchell Kopytko	2	(Manitoba) Jordon McDonald	2
(Manitoba) Jordon McDonald	7

First Knockout				Qualifier 3
(Japan) Tsuyoshi Yamaguchi	8
(Japan) Kouki Ogiwara	3	(Japan) Tsuyoshi Yamaguchi	9
(South Korea) Jeong Byeong-jin	5	(South Korea) Jeong Byeong-jin	1
(Japan) Shinya Abe	1			(Japan) Tsuyoshi Yamaguchi	3
(British Columbia) Matthew Hall	7			(British Columbia) Matthew Hall	2
(British Columbia) Richard Krell	1	(British Columbia) Matthew Hall	7
(British Columbia) Jim Cotter	4	(Alberta) Evan van Amsterdam	3
(Alberta) Evan van Amsterdam	7

==== B Event ====
Second Knockout	Qualifier 4
(South Korea) Jeong Byeong-jin	8
(British Columbia) Justin Nillson	3	(British Columbia) Jay Wakefield	2
(British Columbia) Jay Wakefield	6	(South Korea) Jeong Byeong-jin	1
(British Columbia) Jason Montgomery	9
(Alberta) Evan van Amsterdam	2
(British Columbia) Jason Montgomery	9	(British Columbia) Jason Montgomery	6
(British Columbia) Matt Tolley	5	(British Columbia) Jason Montgomery	3
(South Korea) Lee Jae-beom	5

Second Knockout	Qualifier 5
(Switzerland) Kim Schwaller	6
(Alberta) Daniel Humbke	4	(British Columbia) Matthew Blandford	1
(British Columbia) Matthew Blandford	6	(Switzerland) Kim Schwaller	3
(Alberta) Ryan Jacques	6
(Alberta) Ryan Jacques	6
(British Columbia) Josh Miki	3	(British Columbia) Mitchell Kopytko	3
(British Columbia) Mitchell Kopytko	7	(Alberta) Ryan Jacques	8
(British Columbia) Matthew Hall	1

Second Knockout	Qualifier 6
(Saskatchewan) Tyler Tardi	6
(Japan) Kouki Ogiwara	6	(Japan) Shinya Abe	1
(Japan) Shinya Abe	9	(Saskatchewan) Tyler Tardi	7
(British Columbia) Jim Cotter	4
(Manitoba) Jordon McDonald	4
(British Columbia) Richard Krell	1	(British Columbia) Jim Cotter	8
(British Columbia) Jim Cotter	7	(Saskatchewan) Tyler Tardi	5
(Japan) Takumi Maeda	4

==== C Event ====
Third Knockout	Qualifier 7
(British Columbia) Jay Wakefield	1
(Alberta) Evan van Amsterdam	6
(Alberta) Evan van Amsterdam	6
(British Columbia) Matthew Blandford	1	(British Columbia) Jim Cotter	5
(British Columbia) Mitchell Kopytko	9	(British Columbia) Mitchell Kopytko	5
(British Columbia) Jim Cotter	7
(Alberta) Evan van Amsterdam	4
(British Columbia) Matthew Hall	5
(South Korea) Jeong Byeong-jin	2
(Japan) Shinya Abe	7	(Japan) Shinya Abe	8
(Manitoba) Jordon McDonald	4	(Japan) Shinya Abe	3
(British Columbia) Matthew Hall	6

Third Knockout	Qualifier 8
(Japan) Takumi Maeda	7
(British Columbia) Justin Nillson	2	(Switzerland) Kim Schwaller	2
(British Columbia) Matt Tolley	6	(British Columbia) Matt Tolley	3
(Switzerland) Kim Schwaller	7
(Japan) Takumi Maeda	2
(British Columbia) Richard Krell	8
(British Columbia) Jason Montgomery	1
(Alberta) Daniel Humbke	6	(British Columbia) Richard Krell	10
(British Columbia) Josh Miki	7	(British Columbia) Josh Miki	6
(Japan) Kouki Ogiwara	3	(British Columbia) Richard Krell	8
(British Columbia) Richard Krell	6

=== Knockout Results ===
All draw times are listed in Pacific Time (UTC−08:00).

==== Draw 4 ====
Friday, October 2, 8:00 am

Sheet 1	1	2	3	4	5	6	7	8	Final
(Alberta) Ryan Jacques	1	0	0	3	1	0	1	X	6
(British Columbia) Jason Montgomery 🔨	0	1	0	0	0	2	0	X	3

Sheet 2	1	2	3	4	5	6	7	8	Final
(British Columbia) Mitchell Kopytko	0	1	0	1	0	0	0	X	2
(Manitoba) Jordon McDonald 🔨	0	0	1	0	3	2	1	X	7

Sheet 3	1	2	3	4	5	6	7	8	Final
(British Columbia) Matt Tolley 🔨	0	0	4	0	1	0	1	0	6
(Japan) Takumi Maeda	0	0	0	3	0	3	0	1	7

Sheet 4	1	2	3	4	5	6	7	8	Final
(Switzerland) Marco Hösli 🔨	2	2	2	0	2	X	X	X	8
(British Columbia) Justin Nillson	0	0	0	1	0	X	X	X	1

Sheet 5	1	2	3	4	5	6	7	8	9	Final
(Saskatchewan) Tyler Tardi	0	3	1	0	1	0	1	0	1	7
(Alberta) Daniel Humbke 🔨	2	0	0	1	0	1	0	2	0	6

Sheet 6	1	2	3	4	5	6	7	8	Final
(British Columbia) Jay Wakefield 🔨	0	0	0	1	0	0	X	X	1
(Switzerland) Kim Schwaller	1	1	1	0	0	4	X	X	7

Sheet 7	1	2	3	4	5	6	7	8	Final
(South Korea) Lee Jae-beom 🔨	0	1	0	3	1	1	0	1	7
(British Columbia) Matthew Blandford	1	0	3	0	0	0	1	0	5

Sheet 8	1	2	3	4	5	6	7	8	Final
(Alberta) Jacob Libbus 🔨	2	0	2	0	0	2	0	0	6
(British Columbia) Josh Miki	0	2	0	1	0	0	1	1	5

==== Draw 5 ====
Friday, October 2, 10:30 am

Sheet 7	1	2	3	4	5	6	7	8	Final
(Japan) Tsuyoshi Yamaguchi 🔨	1	0	2	0	2	2	1	X	8
(Japan) Kouki Ogiwara	0	2	0	1	0	0	0	X	3

Sheet 8	1	2	3	4	5	6	7	8	Final
(South Korea) Jeong Byeong-jin 🔨	0	1	1	0	0	2	1	X	5
(Japan) Shinya Abe	0	0	0	1	0	0	0	X	1

==== Draw 6 ====
Friday, October 2, 1:00 pm

Sheet 2	1	2	3	4	5	6	7	8	Final
(British Columbia) Matthew Hall 🔨	1	1	0	1	4	X	X	X	7
(British Columbia) Richard Krell	0	0	1	0	0	X	X	X	1

Sheet 3	1	2	3	4	5	6	7	8	Final
(British Columbia) Jim Cotter	0	1	0	0	2	0	1	0	4
(Alberta) Evan van Amsterdam 🔨	2	0	0	2	0	2	0	1	7

==== Draw 7 ====
Friday, October 2, 4:00 pm

Sheet 1	1	2	3	4	5	6	7	8	Final
(Switzerland) Marco Hösli	0	0	2	0	2	0	3	X	7
(Switzerland) Kim Schwaller 🔨	1	0	0	2	0	1	0	X	4

Sheet 2	1	2	3	4	5	6	7	8	Final
(Saskatchewan) Tyler Tardi 🔨	0	0	1	0	2	0	2	X	5
(South Korea) Lee Jae-beom	2	2	0	2	0	1	0	X	7

Sheet 5	1	2	3	4	5	6	7	8	Final
(Alberta) Jacob Libbus 🔨	1	0	0	1	0	0	1	2	5
(Manitoba) Jordon McDonald	0	1	0	0	0	1	0	0	2

Sheet 6	1	2	3	4	5	6	7	8	9	Final
(Alberta) Ryan Jacques	0	3	2	0	0	2	0	1	0	8
(Japan) Takumi Maeda 🔨	2	0	0	2	2	0	2	0	1	9

==== Draw 9 ====
Friday, October 2, 9:00 pm

Sheet 1	1	2	3	4	5	6	7	8	Final
(Japan) Kouki Ogiwara 🔨	0	1	2	0	1	0	2	0	6
(Japan) Shinya Abe	2	0	0	2	0	2	0	3	9

Sheet 2	1	2	3	4	5	6	7	8	Final
(Alberta) Daniel Humbke 🔨	0	1	0	0	2	0	1	0	4
(British Columbia) Matthew Blandford	0	0	3	1	0	1	0	1	6

Sheet 3	1	2	3	4	5	6	7	8	Final
(British Columbia) Josh Miki	0	0	0	1	0	2	0	0	3
(British Columbia) Mitchell Kopytko 🔨	1	0	2	0	1	0	1	2	7

Sheet 4	1	2	3	4	5	6	7	8	Final
(British Columbia) Jason Montgomery	1	0	2	0	3	0	3	X	9
(British Columbia) Matt Tolley 🔨	0	1	0	2	0	2	0	X	5

Sheet 5	1	2	3	4	5	6	7	8	Final
(British Columbia) Justin Nillson	0	0	2	0	0	0	1	0	3
(British Columbia) Jay Wakefield 🔨	1	1	0	1	1	1	0	1	6

Sheet 6	1	2	3	4	5	6	7	8	Final
(Japan) Tsuyoshi Yamaguchi 🔨	1	0	5	3	X	X	X	X	9
(South Korea) Jeong Byeong-jin	0	1	0	0	X	X	X	X	1

Sheet 7	1	2	3	4	5	6	7	8	Final
(British Columbia) Richard Krell	0	0	1	0	0	0	X	X	1
(British Columbia) Jim Cotter 🔨	0	2	0	2	1	2	X	X	7

Sheet 8	1	2	3	4	5	6	7	8	Final
(British Columbia) Matthew Hall	0	0	2	0	2	2	1	X	7
(Alberta) Evan van Amsterdam 🔨	0	2	0	1	0	0	0	X	3

==== Draw 11 ====
Saturday, October 3, 11:00 am

Sheet 1	1	2	3	4	5	6	7	8	Final
(South Korea) Jeong Byeong-jin 🔨	2	0	1	1	1	0	3	X	8
(British Columbia) Jay Wakefield	0	1	0	0	0	1	0	X	2

Sheet 2	1	2	3	4	5	6	7	8	Final
(Alberta) Evan van Amsterdam	0	0	1	0	0	1	X	X	2
(British Columbia) Jason Montgomery 🔨	1	2	0	2	1	0	X	X	6

Sheet 3	1	2	3	4	5	6	7	8	Final
(Manitoba) Jordon McDonald 🔨	0	0	2	0	0	2	0	X	4
(British Columbia) Jim Cotter	1	1	0	1	2	0	3	X	8

Sheet 6	1	2	3	4	5	6	7	8	Final
(Saskatchewan) Tyler Tardi 🔨	1	0	0	1	1	3	X	X	6
(Japan) Shinya Abe	0	1	0	0	0	0	X	X	1

Sheet 7	1	2	3	4	5	6	7	8	Final
(Alberta) Ryan Jacques 🔨	0	2	0	1	1	0	2	X	6
(British Columbia) Mitchell Kopytko	0	0	2	0	0	1	0	X	3

Sheet 8	1	2	3	4	5	6	7	8	Final
(Switzerland) Kim Schwaller 🔨	1	3	1	1	0	X	X	X	6
(British Columbia) Matthew Blandford	0	0	0	0	1	X	X	X	1

==== Draw 12 ====
Saturday, October 3, 2:00 pm

Sheet 4	1	2	3	4	5	6	7	8	9	Final
(Japan) Tsuyoshi Yamaguchi	0	0	0	0	0	0	1	1	1	3
(British Columbia) Matthew Hall 🔨	0	1	0	0	0	1	0	0	0	2

Sheet 5	1	2	3	4	5	6	7	8	Final
(Switzerland) Marco Hösli 🔨	0	1	0	1	0	2	1	X	5
(Japan) Takumi Maeda	0	0	1	0	1	0	0	X	2

Sheet 6	1	2	3	4	5	6	7	8	Final
(South Korea) Lee Jae-beom 🔨	0	2	0	1	1	0	0	0	4
(Alberta) Jacob Libbus	0	0	2	0	0	1	1	2	6

==== Draw 13 ====
Saturday, October 3, 5:00 pm

Sheet 2	1	2	3	4	5	6	7	8	Final
(Saskatchewan) Tyler Tardi 🔨	0	2	0	1	0	2	1	1	7
(British Columbia) Jim Cotter	1	0	2	0	1	0	0	0	4

Sheet 4	1	2	3	4	5	6	7	8	Final
(Switzerland) Kim Schwaller	0	1	1	0	0	1	0	0	3
(Alberta) Ryan Jacques 🔨	1	0	0	0	1	0	2	2	6

Sheet 7	1	2	3	4	5	6	7	8	Final
(South Korea) Jeong Byeong-jin	0	0	1	0	0	0	X	X	1
(British Columbia) Jason Montgomery 🔨	1	1	0	3	1	3	X	X	9

==== Draw 14 ====
Saturday, October 3, 8:00 pm

Sheet 2	1	2	3	4	5	6	7	8	Final
(Japan) Shinya Abe 🔨	1	0	3	0	2	1	0	X	7
(Manitoba) Jordon McDonald	0	3	0	1	0	0	0	X	4

Sheet 3	1	2	3	4	5	6	7	8	Final
(British Columbia) Justin Nillson	0	0	2	0	0	0	0	X	2
(British Columbia) Matt Tolley 🔨	1	0	0	2	1	1	1	X	6

Sheet 4	1	2	3	4	5	6	7	8	Final
(Japan) Kouki Ogiwara	0	0	1	0	1	0	1	X	3
(British Columbia) Richard Krell 🔨	3	1	0	1	0	1	0	X	6

Sheet 5	1	2	3	4	5	6	7	8	9	Final
(Alberta) Daniel Humbke 🔨	2	0	0	2	0	1	1	0	0	6
(British Columbia) Josh Miki	0	0	2	0	2	0	0	2	1	7

Sheet 6	1	2	3	4	5	6	7	8	Final
(British Columbia) Matthew Blandford	0	0	1	0	0	X	X	X	1
(British Columbia) Mitchell Kopytko 🔨	2	2	0	3	2	X	X	X	9

==== Draw 15 ====
Sunday, October 4, 9:00 am

Sheet 4	1	2	3	4	5	6	7	8	Final
(British Columbia) Jason Montgomery 🔨	0	0	1	0	1	0	1	0	3
(South Korea) Lee Jae-beom	1	1	0	1	0	2	0	0	5

Sheet 7	1	2	3	4	5	6	7	8	9	Final
(Saskatchewan) Tyler Tardi 🔨	2	0	0	1	0	0	1	0	1	5
(Japan) Takumi Maeda	0	0	1	0	1	0	0	2	0	4

Sheet 8	1	2	3	4	5	6	7	8	Final
(Alberta) Ryan Jacques 🔨	2	0	5	1	X	X	X	X	8
(British Columbia) Matthew Hall	0	1	0	0	X	X	X	X	1

==== Draw 16 ====
Sunday, October 4, 12:30 pm

Sheet 1	1	2	3	4	5	6	7	8	Final
(South Korea) Jeong Byeong-jin	0	0	1	1	0	X	X	X	2
(Japan) Shinya Abe 🔨	1	2	0	0	5	X	X	X	8

Sheet 2	1	2	3	4	5	6	7	8	Final
(British Columbia) Josh Miki	0	0	1	0	3	0	2	0	6
(British Columbia) Richard Krell 🔨	2	3	0	1	0	1	0	1	8

Sheet 4	1	2	3	4	5	6	7	8	Final
(British Columbia) Jay Wakefield 🔨	0	1	0	0	0	0	X	X	1
(Alberta) Evan van Amsterdam	0	0	0	2	2	2	X	X	6

Sheet 7	1	2	3	4	5	6	7	8	Final
(British Columbia) Matt Tolley	0	0	2	0	1	0	0	X	3
(Switzerland) Kim Schwaller 🔨	0	1	0	1	0	2	3	X	7

Sheet 8	1	2	3	4	5	6	7	8	9	Final
(British Columbia) Mitchell Kopytko 🔨	0	0	1	1	0	0	0	3	0	5
(British Columbia) Jim Cotter	1	2	0	0	0	1	1	0	2	7

==== Draw 17 ====
Sunday, October 4, 4:00 pm

Sheet 2	1	2	3	4	5	6	7	8	Final
(Japan) Takumi Maeda 🔨	1	0	2	0	2	0	2	X	7
(Switzerland) Kim Schwaller	0	0	0	1	0	1	0	X	2

Sheet 3	1	2	3	4	5	6	7	8	Final
(British Columbia) Jason Montgomery	0	0	0	1	0	0	X	X	1
(British Columbia) Richard Krell 🔨	0	0	2	0	4	4	X	X	10

Sheet 5	1	2	3	4	5	6	7	8	Final
(Japan) Shinya Abe	0	0	1	1	0	0	1	X	3
(British Columbia) Matthew Hall 🔨	1	1	0	0	2	2	0	X	6

Sheet 6	1	2	3	4	5	6	7	8	9	Final
(Alberta) Evan van Amsterdam	0	1	0	1	0	2	1	0	1	6
(British Columbia) Jim Cotter 🔨	1	0	2	0	1	0	0	1	0	5

==== Draw 18 ====
Sunday, October 4, 7:00 pm

Sheet 3	1	2	3	4	5	6	7	8	9	Final
(Alberta) Evan van Amsterdam 🔨	1	1	0	0	1	0	0	1	0	4
(British Columbia) Matthew Hall	0	0	2	1	0	0	1	0	1	5

Sheet 5	1	2	3	4	5	6	7	8	Final
(Japan) Takumi Maeda	0	0	1	0	1	0	0	X	2
(British Columbia) Richard Krell 🔨	0	1	0	1	0	2	4	X	8

=== Playoffs ===
Quarterfinals
A1	(Switzerland) Marco Hösli	7
C2	(British Columbia) Richard Krell	3
B2	(Alberta) Ryan Jacques	2
B3	(Saskatchewan) Tyler Tardi	5
A3	(Japan) Tsuyoshi Yamaguchi	7
C1	(British Columbia) Matthew Hall	2
A2	(Alberta) Jacob Libbus	3
B1	(South Korea) Lee Jae-beom	4

Semifinals
A1	(Switzerland) Marco Hösli	6
B3	(Saskatchewan) Tyler Tardi	2
A3	(Japan) Tsuyoshi Yamaguchi	4
B1	(South Korea) Lee Jae-beom	1

Final
A1	(Switzerland) Marco Hösli	7
A3	(Japan) Tsuyoshi Yamaguchi	6

==== Quarterfinals ====
Monday, October 5, 9:00 am

Sheet 2	1	2	3	4	5	6	7	8	Final
(Switzerland) Marco Hösli 🔨	2	1	0	1	0	0	3	X	7
(British Columbia) Richard Krell	0	0	1	0	1	1	0	X	3

Sheet 3	1	2	3	4	5	6	7	8	Final
(Alberta) Ryan Jacques	0	0	0	1	0	0	1	X	2
(Saskatchewan) Tyler Tardi 🔨	0	1	2	0	2	0	0	X	5

Sheet 5	1	2	3	4	5	6	7	8	Final
(Alberta) Jacob Libbus 🔨	0	2	0	0	0	1	0	0	3
(South Korea) Lee Jae-beom	0	0	2	0	0	0	0	2	4

Sheet 6	1	2	3	4	5	6	7	8	Final
(Japan) Tsuyoshi Yamaguchi 🔨	2	1	2	0	2	X	X	X	7
(British Columbia) Matthew Hall	0	0	0	2	0	X	X	X	2

==== Semifinals ====
Monday, October 5, 12:00 pm

Sheet 3	1	2	3	4	5	6	7	8	Final
(Japan) Tsuyoshi Yamaguchi 🔨	1	0	0	0	0	1	0	2	4
(South Korea) Lee Jae-beom	0	0	0	0	0	0	1	0	1

Sheet 5	1	2	3	4	5	6	7	8	Final
(Switzerland) Marco Hösli 🔨	0	2	0	0	2	2	X	X	6
(Saskatchewan) Tyler Tardi	0	0	1	1	0	0	X	X	2

==== Final ====
Monday, October 5, 3:00 pm

Sheet 4	1	2	3	4	5	6	7	8	9	Final
(Switzerland) Marco Hösli	0	0	0	2	0	2	2	0	1	7
(Japan) Tsuyoshi Yamaguchi 🔨	0	2	2	0	1	0	0	1	0	6

== Women ==
=== Teams ===
The teams are listed as follows:

Skip	Third	Second	Lead	Alternate	Locale
Shiella Cowan	Sandra Comadina	Victoria Murphy	Tracy Steckler (Note: Tracy Steckler spared for Jody Maskiewich. She played lead while Sandra Comadina moved to third.)		New Westminster, British Columbia
Sarah Daniels	Abby Ackland	Calissa Daly	Dayna Demmans		New Westminster, British Columbia
Keelie Duncan	Eryn Czirfusz	Ivy Jensen	Tessa Terrick		Winnipeg, Manitoba
Kim Min-ji (Fourth)	Gim Eun-ji (Skip)	Seol Ye-ji (Note: Alternate Seol Ye-ji played second, replacing Kim Su-ji.)	Seol Ye-eun	Kim Su-ji	Uijeongbu, South Korea
Serena Gray-Withers	Catherine Clifford	Laura Walker	Zoe Cinnamon		Edmonton, Alberta
Holly Hafeli	Julia Markle	Emma Woike	Maya Belway		Kamloops, British Columbia
Mahra Harris	Meredith Cole	Sasha Wilson	Katelyn McGillivray		Victoria, British Columbia
Kim Kyeong-ae (Note: Kim Kyeong-ae skipped Team Kang as Kang Bo-bae was training with the mixed doubles national team. Kim Min-seo moved from alternate to third.)	Kim Min-seo	Shim Yu-jeong	Kim Ji-soo		Jeonbuk, South Korea
Kim Ji-yoon	Lee Eun-chae	Lee Hae-in	Yang Seung-hee		Seoul, South Korea
Ikue Kitazawa	Seina Nakajima	Minori Suzuki	Hasumi Ishigooka		Nagano, Japan
Kayla MacMillan (Fourth)	Val Sweeting (Skip) (Note: Val Sweeting skipped Team MacMillan.)	Lindsay Dubue	Lauren Lenentine		Victoria, British Columbia
Yuina Miura	Kohane Tsuruga	Rin Suzuki	Aone Nakamura		Sapporo, Japan
Miku Nihira	Momoha Tabata	Sae Yamamoto	Mikoto Nakajima		Sapporo, Japan
Chelsea Carey (Note: Chelsea Carey spared for Selena Njegovan and skipped Team Njegovan.)	Erin Pincott	Margot Flemming	Krysten Karwacki		Winnipeg, Manitoba
Park You-been	Park Seo-jin	Yang Tae-i	Kim Su-jin		Chuncheon, South Korea
Kelsey Powell	Falon Chretien	Alyssa Volk	Carley Sandwith-Craig		Vernon, British Columbia
Lane Prokopowich	Gabby Brissette	Ashley Mallett	Sophie Brissette		Vernon, British Columbia
Taylor Reese-Hansen	Megan McGillivray	Kim Bonneau	Julianna Mackenzie		Victoria, British Columbia
Penny Shantz	Deb Erdos	Tracey Latosky	Janet Suter		Vernon, British Columbia
Kayla Skrlik	Myla Plett	– (Note: Team Skrlik played with three players.)	Samantha Fisher		Calgary, Alberta
Selena Sturmay	Danielle Schmiemann	Dezaray Hawes	Paige Papley		Edmonton, Alberta
Miyu Ueno	Asuka Kanai	– (Note: Team Ueno played with three players.)	Yui Ueno		Karuizawa, Japan
Sarah Wark	Stephanie Jackson-Baier	Jade Merkley	Emma Graham		Chilliwack, British Columbia
Kayla Wilson	Jorja Kopytko	Sarah Wong	Amanda Wong		Victoria, British Columbia

=== Round robin standings ===
Final Round Robin Standings

Key
Teams to Playoffs

Pool A	W	L	PF	PA
(South Korea) Gim Eun-ji	5	0	37	7
(Alberta) Serena Gray-Withers	3	2	32	24
(Japan) Miyu Ueno	3	2	30	21
(British Columbia) Holly Hafeli	2	3	22	40
(British Columbia) Mahra Harris	2	3	23	32
(British Columbia) Shiella Cowan	0	5	15	35

Pool B	W	L	PF	PA
(Japan) Miku Nihira	5	0	31	15
(Japan) Yuina Miura	4	1	28	19
(British Columbia) Team MacMillan	3	2	28	27
(Alberta) Selena Sturmay	2	3	25	22
(British Columbia) Sarah Wark	1	4	19	35
(British Columbia) Kelsey Powell	0	5	18	31

Pool C	W	L	PF	PA
(South Korea) Park You-been	4	1	37	19
(British Columbia) Taylor Reese-Hansen	4	1	32	16
(South Korea) Kim Ji-yoon	4	1	39	20
(British Columbia) Sarah Daniels	2	3	24	29
(British Columbia) Lane Prokopowich	1	4	11	33
(Manitoba) Keelie Duncan	0	5	10	36

Pool D	W	L	PF	PA
(Japan) Ikue Kitazawa	5	0	32	12
(South Korea) Team Kang	4	1	30	19
(Alberta) Kayla Skrlik	3	2	27	23
(Manitoba) Team Njegovan	2	3	28	29
(British Columbia) Kayla Wilson	1	4	25	38
(British Columbia) Penny Shantz	0	5	19	40

=== Round robin results ===
All draw times are listed in Pacific Time (UTC−08:00).

==== Draw 1 ====
Thursday, October 1, 3:00 pm

Sheet 1	1	2	3	4	5	6	7	8	Final
(South Korea) Gim Eun-ji 🔨	0	2	1	0	3	0	X	X	6
(British Columbia) Mahra Harris	0	0	0	1	0	1	X	X	2

Sheet 2	1	2	3	4	5	6	7	8	Final
(Alberta) Serena Gray-Withers 🔨	3	0	0	4	0	0	4	X	11
(British Columbia) Holly Hafeli	0	0	1	0	1	1	0	X	3

Sheet 3	1	2	3	4	5	6	7	8	Final
(Japan) Miyu Ueno 🔨	0	2	1	1	0	0	2	X	6
(British Columbia) Shiella Cowan	0	0	0	0	1	1	0	X	2

Sheet 4	1	2	3	4	5	6	7	8	Final
(South Korea) Kim Ji-yoon 🔨	0	0	2	0	2	0	0	1	5
(Manitoba) Keelie Duncan	0	0	0	2	0	1	0	0	3

Sheet 5	1	2	3	4	5	6	7	8	Final
(British Columbia) Taylor Reese-Hansen 🔨	0	1	3	1	3	X	X	X	8
(British Columbia) Lane Prokopowich	0	0	0	0	0	X	X	X	0

Sheet 6	1	2	3	4	5	6	7	8	Final
(South Korea) Park You-been 🔨	0	3	0	5	0	2	X	X	10
(British Columbia) Sarah Daniels	0	0	2	0	1	0	X	X	3

==== Draw 2 ====
Thursday, October 1, 6:00 pm

Sheet 1	1	2	3	4	5	6	7	8	Final
(British Columbia) Team MacMillan 🔨	2	0	1	0	2	0	3	X	8
(British Columbia) Sarah Wark	0	1	0	0	0	2	0	X	3

Sheet 2	1	2	3	4	5	6	7	8	Final
(Japan) Miku Nihira 🔨	2	1	0	2	3	X	X	X	8
(Japan) Yuina Miura	0	0	1	0	0	X	X	X	1

Sheet 3	1	2	3	4	5	6	7	8	Final
(Manitoba) Team Njegovan	0	3	0	2	3	2	X	X	10
(British Columbia) Kayla Wilson 🔨	4	0	0	0	0	0	X	X	4

Sheet 4	1	2	3	4	5	6	7	8	Final
(South Korea) Team Kang 🔨	0	1	0	0	3	0	2	X	6
(Alberta) Kayla Skrlik	0	0	1	1	0	1	0	X	3

Sheet 5	1	2	3	4	5	6	7	8	Final
(Alberta) Selena Sturmay 🔨	2	0	0	6	1	X	X	X	9
(British Columbia) Kelsey Powell	0	1	1	0	0	X	X	X	2

Sheet 6	1	2	3	4	5	6	7	8	Final
(Japan) Ikue Kitazawa 🔨	2	0	2	3	X	X	X	X	7
(British Columbia) Penny Shantz	0	1	0	0	X	X	X	X	1

==== Draw 3 ====
Thursday, October 1, 9:00 pm

Sheet 1	1	2	3	4	5	6	7	8	9	Final
(South Korea) Park You-been	0	1	1	0	2	1	2	0	1	8
(South Korea) Kim Ji-yoon 🔨	2	0	0	4	0	0	0	1	0	7

Sheet 2	1	2	3	4	5	6	7	8	Final
(British Columbia) Taylor Reese-Hansen 🔨	0	0	2	0	2	1	1	X	6
(Manitoba) Keelie Duncan	0	0	0	3	0	0	0	X	3

Sheet 3	1	2	3	4	5	6	7	8	Final
(British Columbia) Sarah Daniels 🔨	0	0	0	1	0	4	1	X	6
(British Columbia) Lane Prokopowich	1	0	0	0	0	0	0	X	1

Sheet 4	1	2	3	4	5	6	7	8	Final
(Alberta) Serena Gray-Withers 🔨	2	1	1	0	0	3	X	X	7
(British Columbia) Shiella Cowan	0	0	0	1	1	0	X	X	2

Sheet 5	1	2	3	4	5	6	7	8	Final
(British Columbia) Mahra Harris 🔨	2	0	0	3	0	0	1	1	7
(British Columbia) Holly Hafeli	0	5	0	0	2	1	0	0	8

Sheet 6	1	2	3	4	5	6	7	8	Final
(South Korea) Gim Eun-ji	0	0	5	3	1	X	X	X	9
(Japan) Miyu Ueno 🔨	0	1	0	0	0	X	X	X	1

==== Draw 5 ====
Friday, October 2, 10:30 am

Sheet 1	1	2	3	4	5	6	7	8	Final
(Manitoba) Team Njegovan	1	1	1	0	0	0	0	X	3
(Alberta) Kayla Skrlik 🔨	0	0	0	4	0	2	1	X	7

Sheet 2	1	2	3	4	5	6	7	8	Final
(British Columbia) Kelsey Powell	0	2	0	1	0	1	0	0	4
(British Columbia) Sarah Wark 🔨	1	0	2	0	1	0	1	2	7

Sheet 3	1	2	3	4	5	6	7	8	Final
(South Korea) Team Kang	0	0	1	1	0	X	X	X	2
(Japan) Ikue Kitazawa 🔨	3	3	0	0	2	X	X	X	8

Sheet 4	1	2	3	4	5	6	7	8	Final
(British Columbia) Kayla Wilson	2	1	0	3	0	2	0	2	10
(British Columbia) Penny Shantz 🔨	0	0	2	0	2	0	3	0	7

Sheet 5	1	2	3	4	5	6	7	8	Final
(Japan) Miku Nihira	1	0	4	0	0	3	0	1	9
(British Columbia) Team MacMillan 🔨	0	3	0	2	0	0	1	0	6

Sheet 6	1	2	3	4	5	6	7	8	Final
(Alberta) Selena Sturmay	0	1	0	0	0	0	X	X	1
(Japan) Yuina Miura 🔨	1	0	1	1	1	3	X	X	7

==== Draw 6 ====
Friday, October 2, 1:00 pm

Sheet 1	1	2	3	4	5	6	7	8	Final
(British Columbia) Shiella Cowan 🔨	1	2	0	2	0	0	0	X	5
(British Columbia) Holly Hafeli	0	0	3	0	0	4	2	X	9

Sheet 4	1	2	3	4	5	6	7	8	Final
(Japan) Miyu Ueno	1	2	0	2	4	X	X	X	9
(British Columbia) Mahra Harris 🔨	0	0	1	0	0	X	X	X	1

Sheet 5	1	2	3	4	5	6	7	8	Final
(South Korea) Gim Eun-ji 🔨	1	4	2	1	X	X	X	X	8
(Alberta) Serena Gray-Withers	0	0	0	0	X	X	X	X	0

Sheet 6	1	2	3	4	5	6	7	8	Final
(South Korea) Park You-been	0	0	1	0	0	X	X	X	1
(British Columbia) Taylor Reese-Hansen 🔨	2	1	0	2	2	X	X	X	7

Sheet 7	1	2	3	4	5	6	7	8	Final
(Manitoba) Keelie Duncan 🔨	1	0	0	0	0	X	X	X	1
(British Columbia) Lane Prokopowich	0	1	3	1	3	X	X	X	8

Sheet 8	1	2	3	4	5	6	7	8	Final
(South Korea) Kim Ji-yoon 🔨	0	2	0	0	3	2	3	X	10
(British Columbia) Sarah Daniels	0	0	0	3	0	0	0	X	3

==== Draw 7 ====
Friday, October 2, 4:00 pm

Sheet 3	1	2	3	4	5	6	7	8	Final
(Japan) Miku Nihira	0	1	0	0	2	0	0	1	4
(British Columbia) Kelsey Powell 🔨	0	0	0	1	0	0	2	0	3

Sheet 4	1	2	3	4	5	6	7	8	Final
(British Columbia) Team MacMillan	0	0	0	1	0	1	0	X	2
(Japan) Yuina Miura 🔨	0	1	1	0	3	0	0	X	5

Sheet 7	1	2	3	4	5	6	7	8	Final
(Alberta) Selena Sturmay 🔨	2	1	0	0	2	0	2	X	7
(British Columbia) Sarah Wark	0	0	0	2	0	1	0	X	3

Sheet 8	1	2	3	4	5	6	7	8	Final
(Manitoba) Team Njegovan	0	3	0	0	3	3	X	X	9
(British Columbia) Penny Shantz 🔨	1	0	2	1	0	0	X	X	4

==== Draw 8 ====
Friday, October 2, 6:30 pm

Sheet 1	1	2	3	4	5	6	7	8	Final
(South Korea) Team Kang 🔨	3	0	2	3	0	X	X	X	8
(British Columbia) Kayla Wilson	0	0	0	0	1	X	X	X	1

Sheet 2	1	2	3	4	5	6	7	8	Final
(South Korea) Gim Eun-ji 🔨	0	2	0	1	0	3	1	X	7
(British Columbia) Shiella Cowan	0	0	1	0	2	0	0	X	3

Sheet 3	1	2	3	4	5	6	7	8	Final
(South Korea) Park You-been 🔨	0	3	0	4	0	2	X	X	9
(Manitoba) Keelie Duncan	0	0	0	0	1	0	X	X	1

Sheet 4	1	2	3	4	5	6	7	8	Final
(British Columbia) Taylor Reese-Hansen	0	2	0	1	1	0	1	1	6
(British Columbia) Sarah Daniels 🔨	0	0	3	0	0	1	0	0	4

Sheet 5	1	2	3	4	5	6	7	8	Final
(Japan) Ikue Kitazawa	0	0	1	0	1	2	0	0	4
(Alberta) Kayla Skrlik 🔨	1	0	0	0	0	0	2	0	3

Sheet 6	1	2	3	4	5	6	7	8	Final
(South Korea) Kim Ji-yoon	0	1	1	2	3	0	2	X	9
(British Columbia) Lane Prokopowich 🔨	0	0	0	0	0	1	0	X	1

Sheet 7	1	2	3	4	5	6	7	8	Final
(Japan) Miyu Ueno 🔨	3	1	0	2	4	X	X	X	10
(British Columbia) Holly Hafeli	0	0	1	0	0	X	X	X	1

Sheet 8	1	2	3	4	5	6	7	8	Final
(Alberta) Serena Gray-Withers 🔨	0	1	0	2	0	0	3	0	6
(British Columbia) Mahra Harris	1	0	1	0	3	1	0	1	7

==== Draw 10 ====
Saturday, October 3, 8:00 am

Sheet 2	1	2	3	4	5	6	7	8	Final
(Alberta) Kayla Skrlik	1	0	2	0	2	2	0	0	7
(British Columbia) Kayla Wilson 🔨	0	1	0	3	0	0	1	1	6

Sheet 3	1	2	3	4	5	6	7	8	Final
(Alberta) Serena Gray-Withers 🔨	1	1	0	0	2	3	0	1	8
(Japan) Miyu Ueno	0	0	2	1	0	0	1	0	4

Sheet 4	1	2	3	4	5	6	7	8	Final
(South Korea) Gim Eun-ji 🔨	0	4	3	0	X	X	X	X	7
(British Columbia) Holly Hafeli	0	0	0	1	X	X	X	X	1

Sheet 5	1	2	3	4	5	6	7	8	Final
(Japan) Yuina Miura 🔨	1	0	0	0	1	1	0	1	4
(British Columbia) Kelsey Powell	0	1	0	1	0	0	1	0	3

Sheet 6	1	2	3	4	5	6	7	8	Final
(British Columbia) Team MacMillan 🔨	0	1	0	1	1	0	1	1	5
(Alberta) Selena Sturmay	1	0	1	0	0	2	0	0	4

Sheet 7	1	2	3	4	5	6	7	8	Final
(British Columbia) Mahra Harris 🔨	0	0	1	1	1	0	3	X	6
(British Columbia) Shiella Cowan	0	0	0	0	0	3	0	X	3

Sheet 8	1	2	3	4	5	6	7	8	Final
(Japan) Miku Nihira	1	0	2	1	0	1	X	X	5
(British Columbia) Sarah Wark 🔨	0	0	0	0	1	0	X	X	1

==== Draw 11 ====
Saturday, October 3, 11:00 am

Sheet 4	1	2	3	4	5	6	7	8	Final
(Japan) Ikue Kitazawa 🔨	2	0	1	0	1	3	X	X	7
(Manitoba) Team Njegovan	0	1	0	1	0	0	X	X	2

Sheet 5	1	2	3	4	5	6	7	8	Final
(South Korea) Team Kang 🔨	1	1	0	2	0	2	1	X	7
(British Columbia) Penny Shantz	0	0	1	0	2	0	0	X	3

==== Draw 12 ====
Saturday, October 3, 2:00 pm

Sheet 1	1	2	3	4	5	6	7	8	Final
(British Columbia) Taylor Reese-Hansen 🔨	3	1	0	1	0	0	0	0	5
(South Korea) Kim Ji-yoon	0	0	3	0	1	1	1	2	8

Sheet 2	1	2	3	4	5	6	7	8	Final
(Japan) Miku Nihira 🔨	2	0	0	0	2	0	1	0	5
(Alberta) Selena Sturmay	0	0	1	1	0	1	0	1	4

Sheet 3	1	2	3	4	5	6	7	8	Final
(Japan) Yuina Miura 🔨	0	4	2	0	2	0	3	X	11
(British Columbia) Sarah Wark	1	0	0	3	0	1	0	X	5

Sheet 7	1	2	3	4	5	6	7	8	Final
(British Columbia) Team MacMillan	0	4	1	0	0	1	0	1	7
(British Columbia) Kelsey Powell 🔨	4	0	0	1	0	0	1	0	6

Sheet 8	1	2	3	4	5	6	7	8	Final
(South Korea) Park You-been 🔨	1	1	1	0	3	3	X	X	9
(British Columbia) Lane Prokopowich	0	0	0	1	0	0	X	X	1

==== Draw 13 ====
Saturday, October 3, 5:00 pm

Sheet 3	1	2	3	4	5	6	7	8	Final
(Alberta) Kayla Skrlik	0	2	0	2	1	0	0	2	7
(British Columbia) Penny Shantz 🔨	2	0	1	0	0	0	1	0	4

Sheet 5	1	2	3	4	5	6	7	8	Final
(British Columbia) Sarah Daniels 🔨	1	1	0	2	1	0	3	X	8
(Manitoba) Keelie Duncan	0	0	1	0	0	1	0	X	2

Sheet 6	1	2	3	4	5	6	7	8	Final
(South Korea) Team Kang	1	0	1	0	1	2	0	2	7
(Manitoba) Team Njegovan 🔨	0	1	0	1	0	0	2	0	4

Sheet 8	1	2	3	4	5	6	7	8	Final
(Japan) Ikue Kitazawa 🔨	0	1	0	0	2	0	3	X	6
(British Columbia) Kayla Wilson	0	0	2	1	0	1	0	X	4

=== Playoffs ===
Quarterfinals
1	(Japan) Ikue Kitazawa	5
8	(South Korea) Kim Ji-yoon	6
4	(South Korea) Park You-been	3
5	(Japan) Yuina Miura	6
2	(South Korea) Gim Eun-ji	4
7	(British Columbia) Taylor Reese-Hansen	3
3	(Japan) Miku Nihira	3
6	(South Korea) Team Kang	5

Semifinals
8	(South Korea) Kim Ji-yoon	3
5	(Japan) Yuina Miura	7
2	(South Korea) Gim Eun-ji	6
6	(South Korea) Team Kang	3

Final
5	(Japan) Yuina Miura	2
2	(South Korea) Gim Eun-ji	5

==== Quarterfinals ====
Sunday, October 4, 9:00 am

Sheet 2	1	2	3	4	5	6	7	8	Final
(South Korea) Gim Eun-ji 🔨	0	0	1	1	2	0	0	0	4
(British Columbia) Taylor Reese-Hansen	0	0	0	0	0	1	1	1	3

Sheet 3	1	2	3	4	5	6	7	8	Final
(Japan) Miku Nihira 🔨	0	0	2	0	0	1	0	0	3
(South Korea) Team Kang	0	0	0	1	1	0	2	1	5

Sheet 5	1	2	3	4	5	6	7	8	Final
(South Korea) Park You-been 🔨	1	1	1	0	0	0	0	0	3
(Japan) Yuina Miura	0	0	0	1	1	0	2	2	6

Sheet 6	1	2	3	4	5	6	7	8	Final
(Japan) Ikue Kitazawa 🔨	0	1	2	0	0	0	2	0	5
(South Korea) Kim Ji-yoon	1	0	0	1	2	1	0	1	6

==== Semifinals ====
Sunday, October 4, 12:30 pm

Sheet 3	1	2	3	4	5	6	7	8	Final
(South Korea) Kim Ji-yoon 🔨	0	1	0	1	0	0	1	X	3
(Japan) Yuina Miura	0	0	2	0	4	1	0	X	7

Sheet 5	1	2	3	4	5	6	7	8	Final
(South Korea) Gim Eun-ji 🔨	1	0	0	0	2	0	3	X	6
(South Korea) Team Kang	0	1	0	0	0	2	0	X	3

==== Final ====
Sunday, October 4, 4:00 pm

Sheet 4	1	2	3	4	5	6	7	8	Final
(Japan) Yuina Miura	1	0	0	1	0	0	0	X	2
(South Korea) Gim Eun-ji 🔨	0	0	1	0	3	0	1	X	5
