= 1991 Pacific Curling Championships =

Pacific Curling Championships held at the Ginga Arena in 1991

- Host city: Sagamihara, Japan
- Arena: Ginga Arena
- Dates: November 28–30
- Men's winner: Australia
- Curling club: New South Wales Curling Club
- Skip: Hugh Millikin
- Third: Steve Hewitt
- Second: Daniel Joyce
- Lead: Tom Kidd
- Alternate: Brian Stuart
- Finalist: Japan (Y Kimura)
- Women's winner: Japan
- Skip: Midori Kudoh
- Third: Mayumi Okutsu
- Second: Mayumi Abe
- Lead: Utage Matsuzaki
- Alternate: Rumi Michita
- Finalist: Australia (Jacqueline Lund)

The 1991 Pacific Curling Championships was held at the Ginga Arena in Sagamihara, Japan from November 28 to 30. It was the first edition of the Pacific Curling Championship as it saw Australia and Japan win the men's and women's titles respectively.

== Men's ==
=== Standings ===
Country	Skip	W	L
Australia	Hugh Millikin	4	0
Japan	Y Kimura	1	3
New Zealand	Peter Becker	1	3

=== Results ===
==== Draw 1 ====
Team	1	2	3	4	5	6	7	8	9	10	Final
Australia (Millikin)	4	5	1	1	0	2	0	0	2	X	15
Japan (Kimura)	0	0	0	0	1	0	2	1	0	X	4

==== Draw 2 ====
Team	1	2	3	4	5	6	7	8	9	10	Final
Japan (Kimura)	4	0	3	0	3	2	3	2	X	X	17
New Zealand (Becker)	0	1	0	1	0	0	0	0	X	X	2

==== Draw 3 ====
Team	1	2	3	4	5	6	7	8	9	10	Final
Australia (Millikin)	4	0	4	1	2	2	0	1	5	X	19
New Zealand (Becker)	0	2	0	0	0	0	1	0	0	X	3

==== Draw 4 ====
Team	1	2	3	4	5	6	7	8	9	10	Final
Australia (Millikin)	3	0	2	1	1	1	2	4	X	X	14
New Zealand (Becker)	0	1	0	0	0	0	0	0	X	X	1

==== Draw 5 ====
Team	1	2	3	4	5	6	7	8	9	10	Final
Japan (Kimura)	0	1	0	1	0	1	0	0	0	X	3
Australia (Millikin)	3	0	1	0	2	0	3	1	2	X	12

==== Draw 6 ====
Team	1	2	3	4	5	6	7	8	9	10	11	Final
Japan (Kimura)	0	2	1	0	0	1	1	0	0	1	0	6
New Zealand (Becker)	2	0	0	2	1	0	0	1	0	0	1	7

== Women's ==
=== Result ===
Team	Final
Japan (Kudoh)	8
Australia (Lund)	6
