= 2011 Twin Anchors Invitational =

- Host city: Vernon, British Columbia
- Arena: Vernon Curling Club
- Dates: September 29 – October 3
- Men's winner: (Alberta) Robert Schlender
- Curling club: Edmonton, Alberta
- Skip: Robert Schlender
- Third: Chris Lemishka
- Second: Darcy Hafso
- Lead: Don Bartlett
- Finalist: (British Columbia) Brent Pierce
- Women's winner: (Alberta) Amy Nixon
- Curling club: Calgary, Alberta
- Skip: Amy Nixon
- Third: Bronwen Webster
- Second: Carolyn Darbyshire
- Lead: Chelsey Matson
- Finalist: (Alberta) Lisa Eyamie

The 2011 Twin Anchors Invitational was held from September 29 to October 3 at the Vernon Curling Club in Vernon, British Columbia as part of the 2011–12 World Curling Tour. The women's event, held in a round-robin format, began on September 29 and concluded on October 2, and the men's event, held in a triple-knockout format, began on September 30 and concluded on October 3. The purses for the men's and women's were CAD$27,000 (due to the lack of entries) and CAD $35,000, respectively.

== Men ==
=== Teams ===
Skip	Third	Second	Lead	Locale
Sean Beighton	Andrew Ernst	Sam Galey	Mac Guy	(Washington (state)) Seattle, Washington
Jim Cotter	Kevin Folk	Tyrel Griffith	Rick Sawatsky	Kelowna/Vernon, British Columbia
Mike Johnson (fourth)	Chris Baier	Jay Wakefield (skip)	John Cullen	New Westminster, British Columbia
Bryan Kedziora	Ron Leech	Mike Goerz	Dwayne Uyede	Maple Ridge, British Columbia
Tyler Klymchuk	Dylan Somerton	Michael Horitz	Rhys Gamache	British Columbia
Kevin Koe	Pat Simmons	Carter Rycroft	Nolan Thiessen	Edmonton, Alberta
Yusuke Morozumi	Tsuyoshi Yamaguchi	Tetsuro Shimizu	Kosuke Morozumi	Karuizawa, Japan
Trevor Perepolkin	Ryan LeDrew	Tyler Orme	Chris Anderson	Vernon, British Columbia
Jeff Richard (fourth)	Brent Pierce (skip)	Kevin Recksiedler	Grant Dezura	New Westminster, British Columbia
Dean Ross	Don DeLair	Chris Blackwell	Steve Jensen	Calgary, Alberta
Robert Schlender	Chris Lemishka	Darcy Hafso	Don Bartlett	Edmonton, Alberta
Alexey Tselousov	Andrey Drozdov	Alexey Stukalsky	Aleksey Kamnev	Moscow, Russia
Markku Uusipaavalniemi	Toni Anttila	Kasper Hakunti	Joni Ikonen	Helsinki, Finland
Jessi Wilkinson	Neal Woloschuk	Cody Bartlett	Curtis Der	Edmonton, Alberta
Darren Nelson (fourth)	Brad Wood (skip)	Darin Gerow	Cal Jackson	Vernon, British Columbia
Brent Yamada	Corey Sauer	Brian Fisher	Lance Yamada	Kamloops, British Columbia

=== Results ===
==== A Event ====
First Knockout		Semifinals		Qualifier 1
(Alberta) Kevin Koe	9
(British Columbia) Tyler Klymchuk	3	(Alberta) Kevin Koe	8
(British Columbia) Trevor Perepolkin	7	(British Columbia) Trevor Perepolkin	1
(Alberta) Dean Ross	5			(Alberta) Kevin Koe	5
(Finland) Markku Uusipaavalniemi	4			(Alberta) Jessi Wilkinson	1
(British Columbia) Bryan Kedziora	2	(Finland) Markku Uusipaavalniemi	5
(British Columbia) Brent Yamada	4	(Alberta) Jessi Wilkinson	8
(Alberta) Jessi Wilkinson	7

First Knockout		Semifinals		Qualifier 2
(British Columbia) Jim Cotter	5
(Japan) Yusuke Morozumi	4	(British Columbia) Jim Cotter	7
(Washington (state)) Sean Beighton	2	(British Columbia) Brent Pierce	3
(British Columbia) Brent Pierce	5			(British Columbia) Jim Cotter	1
(Alberta) Robert Schlender	6			(Alberta) Robert Schlender	7
(British Columbia) Jay Wakefield	0	(Alberta) Robert Schlender	7
(British Columbia) Brad Wood	1	(Russia) Alexey Tselousov	4
(Russia) Alexey Tselousov	4

==== B Event ====
Second Knockout
(British Columbia) Tyler Klymchuk	3
(Alberta) Dean Ross	6
(British Columbia) Bryan Kedziora	3
(British Columbia) Brent Yamada	5

Quarterfinals
(Russia) Alexey Tselousov	6
(Alberta) Dean Ross	5
(British Columbia) Brent Pierce	7
(British Columbia) Brent Yamada	1

Semifinals
(Russia) Alexey Tselousov	5
(British Columbia) Brent Pierce	4

Qualifier 3
(Russia) Alexey Tselousov	11
(British Columbia) Jim Cotter	5

Second Knockout
(Japan) Yusuke Morozumi	6
(Washington (state)) Sean Beighton	5
(British Columbia) Jay Wakefield	2
(British Columbia) Brad Wood	7

Quarterfinals
(Finland) Markku Uusipaavalniemi	3
(Japan) Yusuke Morozumi	8
(British Columbia) Trevor Perepolkin	4
(British Columbia) Brad Wood	3

Semifinals
(Japan) Yusuke Morozumi	2
(British Columbia) Trevor Perepolkin	5

Qualifier 4
(British Columbia) Trevor Perepolkin	5
(Alberta) Jessi Wilkinson	3

==== C Event ====
Third Knockout
(British Columbia) Tyler Klymchuk	6
(British Columbia) Bryan Kedziora	7
(Finland) Markku Uusipaavalniemi	1
(British Columbia) Brad Wood	6

Semifinals
(British Columbia) Bryan Kedziora	3
(Japan) Yusuke Morozumi	6
(British Columbia) Brad Wood	4
(British Columbia) Jim Cotter	6

Qualifier 5
(Japan) Yusuke Morozumi	2
(British Columbia) Jim Cotter	6

Third Knockout
(Washington (state)) Sean Beighton	5
(British Columbia) Jay Wakefield	6
(Alberta) Dean Ross	6
(British Columbia) Brent Yamada	3

Semifinals
(British Columbia) Jay Wakefield	0
(British Columbia) Brent Pierce	5
(Alberta) Dean Ross	6
(Alberta) Jessi Wilkinson	4

Qualifier 6
(British Columbia) Brent Pierce	8
(Alberta) Dean Ross	5

=== Playoffs ===
Quarterfinals
(British Columbia) Brent Pierce	6
(Russia) Alexey Tselousov	1
(British Columbia) Trevor Perepolkin	2
(British Columbia) Jim Cotter	8

Semifinals
(Alberta) Kevin Koe	4
(British Columbia) Brent Pierce	5
(Alberta) Robert Schlender	5
(British Columbia) Jim Cotter	4

Final
(British Columbia) Brent Pierce	3
(Alberta) Robert Schlender	5

== Women ==
=== Teams ===
Skip	Third	Second	Lead	Locale
Nicole Backe	Rachelle Kallechy	Lindsae Page	Kelsi Jones	Vancouver, British Columbia
Sarah Wark (fourth)	Michelle Allen	Roselyn Craig (skip)	Megan Montgomery	Duncan, British Columbia
Delia DeJong	Jessica Monk	Amy Janko	Aisha Veiner	Grande Prairie, Alberta
Lisa Eyamie	Maria Bushell	Jodi Marthaller	Kyla MacLachlan	Calgary, Alberta
Diane Foster	Vicki Sjolie	Judy Pendergast	Cheryl Meek	Calgary, Alberta
Satsuki Fujisawa	Miyo Ichikawa	Emi Shimizu	Miyuki Satoh	Karuizawa, Japan
Jessie Kaufman	Nicky Kaufman	Amanda Coderre	Stephanie Enright	Edmonton, Alberta
Amy Nixon*	Bronwen Webster	Carolyn Darbyshire	Chelsey Matson	Calgary, Alberta
Patti Knezevic	Brenda Garvey	Chelan Cotter	Rhonda Camozzi	Prince George, British Columbia
Alyssa Kyllo	Amy Edwards	Zetteh Gunner	Shayna Doll	Vernon, British Columbia
Kelley Law	Shannon Aleksic	Kirsten Fox	Dawn Suliak	New Westminster, British Columbia
Kristy Lewis	Marilou Richter	Michelle Ramsay	Sandra Comadina	Vancouver, British Columbia
Marla Mallett	Darah Provencal	Steph Jackson	Kelly Shimizu	New Westminster, British Columbia
Allison MacInnes	Grace MacInnes	Diane Gushulak	Amanda Brennan	Kamloops, British Columbia
Morgan Muise	Lyndsay Wegmann	Sarah Horne	Michelle Collin	Calgary, Alberta
Liudmila Privivkova	Anna Sidorova	Nkeiruka Ezekh	Ekaterina Galkina	Moscow, Russia
Jen Rusnell	Kristen Fewster	Blaine Richards	Amber Cheveldave	Prince George, British Columbia
Casey Scheidegger	Kalynn Park	Jessie Scheidegger	Joelle Horn	Lethbridge, Alberta
Desirée Schmidt	Brittany Palmer	Heather Nichol	Courtney Schmidt	Trail, British Columbia
Kelly Scott	Dailene Sivertson	Sasha Carter	Jacquie Armstrong	Kelowna, British Columbia
Renée Sonnenberg	Lawnie MacDonald	Kristie Moore	Rona Pasika	Grande Prairie, Alberta
Valerie Sweeting	Leslie Rogers	Joanne Taylor	Rachelle Pidherny	Edmonton, Alberta
Karla Thompson	Roberta Kuhn	Christen Crossley	Kristen Gentile	Kamloops, British Columbia
Olga Zyablikova	Ekaterina Antonova	Victorya Moiseeva	Galina Arsenkina	Moscow, Russia

*Amy Nixon was substituted as skip in place of Shannon Kleibrink, and Bronwen Webster moved to third. Alternate Carolyn Darbyshire took Webster's place at second.

=== Round-robin standings ===
Pool A	W	L
(Russia) Liudmila Privivkova	5	0
(Alberta) Valerie Sweeting	4	1
(British Columbia) Kristy Lewis	3	2
(Alberta) Delia DeJong	1	4
(British Columbia) Desirée Schmidt	1	4
(British Columbia) Nicole Backe	1	4

Pool B	W	L
(Russia) Olga Zyablikova	5	0
(British Columbia) Kelley Law	4	1
(Alberta) Jessie Kaufman	2	2
(British Columbia) Patti Knezevic	2	3
(Alberta) Casey Scheidegger	2	3
(British Columbia) Roselyn Craig	0	5

Pool C	W	L
(Alberta) Renée Sonnenberg	5	0
(Alberta) Amy Nixon	4	1
(Japan) Satsuki Fujisawa	3	2
(Alberta) Diane Foster	1	4
(British Columbia) Allison MacInnes	1	4
(British Columbia) Jen Rusnell	1	4

Pool D	W	L
(British Columbia) Kelly Scott	4	1
(Alberta) Lisa Eyamie	3	2
(British Columbia) Marla Mallett	3	2
(Alberta) Morgan Muise	2	3
(British Columbia) Karla Thompson	2	3
(British Columbia) Alyssa Kyllo	1	4

=== Playoffs ===
Quarterfinals		Semifinals		Final
(Alberta) Renée Sonnenberg	7
(Alberta) Lisa Eyamie	9	(Alberta) Lisa Eyamie	7
(Alberta) Valerie Sweeting	7	(Alberta) Valerie Sweeting	4
(Russia) Olga Zyablikova	4			(Alberta) Lisa Eyamie	3
(Russia) Liudmila Privivkova	8			(Alberta) Amy Nixon	8
(British Columbia) Kelley Law	4	(Russia) Liudmila Privivkova	2
(British Columbia) Kelly Scott	5	(Alberta) Amy Nixon	6
(Alberta) Amy Nixon	6
