= Tom Kidd (curler) =

Australian curler

- Curler ♂
- Born: 15 December 1945 (age 80); Winnipeg, Manitoba

Team
- Curling club: Melbourne CC, New South Wales CC, Victoria Curling Association, Sydney Harbour CC

Curling career
- Member Association: British Columbia; Australia
- World Championship: 3 (1992, 1993, 1994)
- Pacific-Asia Championship: 3 (1991, 1992, 1993)
- Olympic: 1 (1992 - demo)
- Other appearances: World Senior Championships: 1 (2005, 2010, 2011)
Medal record
Curling
Pacific-Asia Championships
| Gold medal – first place | 1991 Sagamihara |
| Gold medal – first place | 1992 Karuizawa |
| Gold medal – first place | 1993 Adelaide |
World Senior Championships
| Bronze medal – third place | 2010 Chelyabinsk |
| Bronze medal – third place | 2011 St. Paul |
Australian Men's Championship
| Gold medal – first place | 1991 |
| Gold medal – first place | 1992 |
| Gold medal – first place | 1993 |

Thomas Kidd (born 15 December 1945) is an Australian curler. He is originally from Winnipeg, Manitoba, where he grew up. He later lived in Richmond, British Columbia. As of 1992, he was living in Melbourne.

At the international level, he is a three-time Pacific champion curler (1991, 1992, 1993).

He competed at the 1992 Winter Olympics when curling was a demonstration sport; Australian men's team finished on seventh place.

At the national level, he is a three-time Australian men's champion curler (1991, 1992, 1993)

== Teams and events ==
=== Men's ===
| Season | Skip | Third | Second | Lead | Alternate | Coach | Events |
|---|---|---|---|---|---|---|---|
| 1991–92 | Hugh Millikin | Tom Kidd | Daniel Joyce | Stephen Hewitt | Brian Stuart (PCC, WOG) | | PCC 1991 (gold); WOG 1992 (demo) (7th); WCC 1992 (6th) |
| 1992–93 | Hugh Millikin | Tom Kidd | Gerald Chick | Brian Johnson | Neil Galbraith | | PCC 1992 (gold); WCC 1993 (6th) |
| 1993–94 | Hugh Millikin | Tom Kidd | Gerald Chick | Stephen Hewitt | Brian Johnson | | PCC 1993 (gold); WCC 1994 (10th) |
| 2004–05 | Lloyd Roberts | Tom Kidd | Jim Oastler | Neil Galbraith | | | WSCC 2005 (19th) |
| 2009–10 | Hugh Millikin | Ted Bassett | Tom Kidd | Rob Gagnon | Dave Thomas | Anita Cochrane | WSCC 2010 (bronze) |
| 2010–11 | Hugh Millikin | John Theriault | Jim Allan | Dave Thomas | Tom Kidd | | WSCC 2011 (bronze) |
