= 2010 Twin Anchors Invitational =

- Host city: Vernon, British Columbia
- Arena: Vernon Curling Club
- Dates: Oct. 1-4, 2010
- Men's winner: Kevin Koe
- Curling club: Saville SC, Edmonton, Alberta
- Skip: Kevin Koe
- Third: Blake MacDonald
- Second: Carter Rycroft
- Lead: Nolan Thiessen
- Finalist: Andrey Drozdov
- Women's winner: Cheryl Bernard
- Curling club: Calgary WC, Calgary, Alberta
- Skip: Cheryl Bernard
- Third: Susan O'Connor
- Second: Carolyn Darbyshire
- Lead: Cori Morris
- Finalist: Liudmila Privivkova

The 2010 Twin Anchors Invitational was held Oct. 1-4. 2010 at the Vernon Curling Club in Vernon, British Columbia. It was held on Week 4 of the 2010-11 World Curling Tour. The purse for the men's event was $37,000 and for the women's, $35,000. The winning men's team was the Kevin Koe rink, which received $8,000 and the women's winner was the Olympic silver medallist Cheryl Bernard rink, which won $7,500.

== Men's ==
=== Teams ===
- (British Columbia) Andrew Bilesky
- (British Columbia) Miles Craig
- (Russia) Andrey Drozdov
- (United States) Pete Fenson
- (British Columbia) Rick Folk
- (British Columbia) Jon Gardner
- (British Columbia) Sean Geall
- (British Columbia) Tyrel Griffith
- (Russia) Jason Gunnlaugson
- (British Columbia) Aron Herrick
- (British Columbia) Dean Horning
- (Alberta) Kevin Koe
- (South Korea) Lee Dong-Keun
- (Manitoba) Mike McEwen
- (British Columbia) Dave Merklinger
- (Switzerland) Sven Michel
- (British Columbia) Bryan Miki
- (Japan) Yusuke Morozumi
- (Alberta) Steve Petryk
- (British Columbia) Brent Pierce
- (British Columbia) Jeff Richard
- (British Columbia) Tobin Senum
- (British Columbia) Bob Ursel
- (British Columbia) Brent Yamada

=== Playoffs ===
Quarterfinals
(British Columbia) Miki	4
(British Columbia) Ursel	7
(Manitoba) McEwen	1
(Alberta) Koe	5
(British Columbia) Folk	6
(Alberta) Petryk	4
(Russia) Drozdov	8
(British Columbia) Herrick	7

Semifinals
(British Columbia) Ursel	2
(Alberta) Koe	8
(British Columbia) Folk	3
(Russia) Drozdov	4

Finals
(Alberta) Koe	5
(Russia) Drozdov	2

== Women's ==
=== Teams ===
- (British Columbia) Jerri Pat Armstrong-Smith
- (British Columbia) Nicole Backe
- (Alberta) Cheryl Bernard
- (British Columbia) Jen Fewster
- (British Columbia) Diane Foster
- (Japan) Satsuki Fujisawa
- (British Columbia) Jennifer Gerow
- (British Columbia) Tracey Jones
- (Alberta) Jessie Kaufman
- (British Columbia) Patti Knezevic
- (British Columbia) Kelley Law
- (British Columbia) Kristy Lewis
- (British Columbia) Allison MacInnes
- (British Columbia) Marla Mallett
- (Japan) Anna Ohmiya
- (Alberta) Desiree Owen
- (Russia) Liudmila Privivkova
- (Manitoba) Brette Richards
- (Alberta) Casey Scheidegger
- (British Columbia) Kelly Scott
- (British Columbia) Desiree Schmidt
- (Russia) Anna Sidorova
- (British Columbia) Karla Thompson
- (China) Wang Bingyu

=== Playoffs ===
Quarterfinals
(Alberta) Bernard	7
(British Columbia) Thompson	4
(China) Wang	5
(Alberta) Kaufman	8
(Russia) Privivkova	8
(British Columbia) Backe	7
(British Columbia) Scott	1
(Alberta) Owen	7

Semifinals
(Alberta) Bernard	7
(Alberta) Kaufman	5
(Russia) Privivkova	7
(Alberta) Owen	2

Finals
(Alberta) Bernard	4
(Russia) Privivkova	2
