= Brian Stuart =

Australian curler

- Curler ♂
- Born: 21 December 1937 (age 88)

Team
- Curling club: Melbourne CC, Victoria Curling Association

Curling career
- Member Association: Australia
- Pacific-Asia Championship: 1 (1991)
- Olympic: 1: (1992, demonstration)
Medal record
Curling
Pacific-Asia Championships
| Gold medal – first place | 1991 Sagamihara |
Australian Men's Championship
| Gold medal – first place | 1991 |

Brian Stuart (born 21 December 1937) is an Australian curler.

At the international level, he is a 1991 Pacific champion curler.

He played for Australia at the 1992 Winter Olympics where curling was a demonstration event. There, the Australian men's team finished in seventh place.

At the national level, he is a 1991 Australian men's champion curler.

== Teams and events ==
| Season | Skip | Third | Second | Lead | Alternate | Coach | Events |
|---|---|---|---|---|---|---|---|
| 1990–91 | Hugh Millikin | Tom Kidd | Daniel Joyce | Stephen Hewitt | Brian Stuart | | AMCC1991 (gold) |
| 1991–92 | Hugh Millikin | Tom Kidd | Daniel Joyce | Stephen Hewitt | Brian Stuart | | PCC 1991 (gold); WOG 1992 (demo) (7th) |
