= 1992 Pacific Curling Championships =

- Host city: Karuizawa, Japan
- Dates: November 1–???
- Men's winner: Australia
- Curling club: Sydney Harbour CC, Sydney
- Skip: Hugh Millikin
- Third: Tom Kidd
- Second: Gerald Chick
- Lead: Brian Johnson
- Alternate: Neil Galbraith
- Finalist: Japan

The 1992 Pacific Curling Championships were held from November 1 to ??? in Karuizawa, Japan for men's teams only.

Australia won the men's event over Japan (it was the second Pacific title for the Australian men).

By virtue of winning, the Australian men's team qualified for the 1993 World Men's Curling Championship in Geneva, Switzerland.

== Men ==
=== Teams ===
| Country | Skip | Third | Second | Lead | Alternate | Coach | Curling club |
|---|---|---|---|---|---|---|---|
| Australia | Hugh Millikin | Tom Kidd | Gerald Chick | Brian Johnson | Neil Galbraith | | Sydney Harbour CC, Sydney |
| Japan | | | | | | | |

=== Best of Five Series ===
| Place | Country | Skip | 1 | 2 | 3 | 4 | 5 | Wins |
|---|---|---|---|---|---|---|---|---|
| 1 | Australia | Hugh Millikin | 13 | 3 | 1 | 12 | 8 | 3 |
| 2 | Japan | | 0 | 7 | 10 | 6 | 5 | 2 |

=== Final standings ===
| Place | Country | Skip | GP | W | L |
|---|---|---|---|---|---|
| 1st place, gold medalist(s) | Australia | Hugh Millikin | 5 | 3 | 2 |
| 2nd place, silver medalist(s) | Japan | | 5 | 2 | 3 |
