= Mayumi Ohkutsu =

Japanese curler

- Curler ♀
- Other names: Mayumi Okutsu, Mayumi Seguchi-Ohkutsu
- Born: Mayumi Seguchi; July 12, 1968 (age 58); Obihiro, Hokkaido, Japan

Team
- Curling club: Obihiro CC, Obihiro & Tokoro CC

Curling career
- Member Association: Japan
- World Championship: 8 (1990, 1992, 1993, 1994, 1995, 1996, 1997, 1998)
- Pacific-Asia Championship: 5 (1991, 1993, 1995, 1996, 1997)
- Olympic: 2 (1992 (demo), 1998)
- Other appearances: World Mixed Championship: 1 (2016)
Medal record
Curling
Pacific-Asia Championships
Gold medal – first place	1991 Sagamihara
Gold medal – first place	1993 Adelaide
Gold medal – first place	1995 Tokoro
Gold medal – first place	1996 Sydney
Gold medal – first place	1997 Karuizawa
Japan Women's Championship
Gold medal – first place	1991 Tokoro
Gold medal – first place	1992 Tokoro
Gold medal – first place	1993 Obihiro
Gold medal – first place	1996 Karuizawa
Gold medal – first place	1997 Karuizawa
Gold medal – first place	1998 Tokoro
Silver medal – second place	1988 Sapporo
Bronze medal – third place	1990 Sapporo

Mayumi Ohkutsu (Japanese: 大久津 真由美; born July 12, 1968, in Obihiro, Hokkaido, Japan as Mayumi Seguchi; also known as Mayumi Seguchi-Ohkutsu, Mayumi Seguchi-Okutsu) is a Japanese curler, a five-time Pacific-Asian champion (1991, 1993, 1995, 1996, 1997) and a six-time Japan women's champion (1991, 1992, 1993, 1996, 1997, 1998).

She played for Japan at the 1998 Winter Olympics, where the Japanese team finished in fifth place. Also, she competed at the 1992 Winter Olympics, where curling was a demonstration sport and the Japanese team finished in eighth place.

== Teams ==
=== Women's ===
Season	Skip	Third	Second	Lead	Alternate	Coach	Events
1987–88	Sanae Ozaki	Utage Matsuzaki	Tomoko Yokoyama	Masumi Yoshikawa	Mayumi Seguchi		JWCC 1988 (silver)
1989–90	Minori Kudo	Mayumi Abe	Etsuko Ito	Kaoru Tatesaki	Mayumi Seguchi		JWCC 1990 (bronze)
1989–90	Midori Kudoh	Kaori Tatezaki	Etsuko Ito	Mayumi Abe	Mayumi Seguchi		WCC 1990 (10th)
1990–91	Mayumi Seguchi	Utage Matsuzaki	Rumi Michida	Hidemi Itai	Yukari Mabuchi		JWCC 1991 (gold)
1991–92	Midori Kudoh	Mayumi Seguchi	Mayumi Abe	Utage Matsuzaki	Rumi Michita		PCC 1991 (gold)
1991–92	Mayumi Seguchi	Midori Kudoh	Mayumi Abe	Utage Matsuzaki	Rumi Michita		WOG 1992 (demo) (8th); JWCC 1992 (gold)
1991–92	Mayumi Seguchi	Midori Kudoh	Mayumi Abe	Rumi Michita	Hidemi Itai		WCC 1992 (9th)
1992–93	Mayumi Seguchi	Mayumi Abe	Hidemi Sakai	Miyuki Nonomura			JWCC 1993 (gold)
1992–93	Mayumi Seguchi	Mayumi Abe	Hidemi Itai	Akemi Niwa	Naomi Kawano		WCC 1993 (6th)
1993–94	Mayumi Seguchi	Hidemi Itai	Akemi Niwa	Miyuki Nonomura	Mami Nishioka		PCC 1993 (gold)
1993–94	Mayumi Seguchi	Ayako Ishigaki	Akemi Niwa	Chieko Horishimizu	Mami Nishioka		WCC 1994 (10th)
1994–95	Ayako Ishigaki	Emi Fujita	Yukari Kondo	Yoko Mimura	Mayumi Ohkutsu		WCC 1995 (9th)
1995–96	Ayako Ishigaki	Emi Arai	Yukari Kondo	Yoko Mimura	Mayumi Ohkutsu		PCC 1995 (gold)
1995–96	Ayako Ishigaki	Mayumi Ohkutsu	Yukari Kondo	Yoko Mimura	Akiko Katoh (WCC)		JWCC 1996 (gold); WCC 1996 (6th)
1996–97	Mayumi Ohkutsu	Akiko Katoh	Yukari Kondo	Yoko Mimura	Akemi Niwa		PCC 1996 (gold); JWCC 1997 (gold); WCC 1997 (4th)
1997–98	Mayumi Ohkutsu	Akiko Katoh	Yukari Kondo	Akemi Niwa	Yoko Mimura		PCC 1997 (gold)
1997–98	Mayumi Ohkutsu	Akiko Katoh	Yukari Kondo	Yoko Mimura	Akemi Niwa	Elaine Dagg-Jackson	WOG 1998 (5th); JWCC 1998 (gold); WCC 1998 (8th)

=== Mixed ===
Season	Skip	Third	Second	Lead	Coach	Events
2016–17	Mayumi Ohkutsu	Fukuhiro Ohno	Yuka Sato	Masayuki Fujii	Misako Kawahira	WMxCC 2016 (5th)
