= 1993 Pacific Curling Championships =

- Host city: Adelaide, Australia
- Dates: November 1–???
- Men's winner: Australia
- Curling club: Sydney Harbour CC, Sydney
- Skip: Hugh Millikin
- Third: Tom Kidd
- Second: Gerald Chick
- Lead: Stephen Hewitt
- Alternate: Brian Johnson
- Finalist: Japan
- Women's winner: Japan
- Skip: Mayumi Seguchi
- Third: Hidemi Itai
- Second: Akemi Niwa
- Lead: Miyuki Nonomura
- Alternate: Mami Nishioka
- Finalist: Australia (Lynn Hewitt)

The 1993 Pacific Curling Championships were held from November 1 to ??? in Adelaide, Australia.

Australia won the men's event over Japan (it was the third Pacific title for the Australian men). On the women's side, Japan defeated Australia in the final (it was the second Pacific title for the Japanese women).

By virtue of winning, the Australian men's team and the Japanese women's team qualified for the 1994 World Men's and Women's Curling Championships in Oberstdorf, Germany.

== Men ==
=== Teams ===
Country	Skip	Third	Second	Lead	Alternate	Coach	Curling club
Australia	Hugh Millikin	Tom Kidd	Gerald Chick	Stephen Hewitt	Brian Johnson		Sydney Harbour CC, Sydney
Japan							
New Zealand	Peter Becker	Barry Brown	John Campbell	Ross A. Stevens		Edwin Harley	

=== Round Robin ===
Place	Country	Skip	(Australia)	(Japan)	(New Zealand)	Wins	Losses
1	Australia	Hugh Millikin	*	8:6; 16:0	14:6; 9:7	4	0
2	Japan		6:8; 0:16	*	13:9; 3:13	1	3
3	New Zealand	Peter Becker	6:14; 7:9	9:13; 13:3	*	1	3

Team to final
Teams to semifinal

=== Playoffs ===
Semifinal		Final
		Australia	9
Japan	8	Japan	5
New Zealand	3

=== Final standings ===
Place	Country	Skip	GP	W	L
1st place, gold medalist(s)	Australia	Hugh Millikin	5	5	0
2nd place, silver medalist(s)	Japan		6	2	4
3rd place, bronze medalist(s)	New Zealand	Peter Becker	5	1	4

== Women ==
=== Teams ===
Country	Skip	Third	Second	Lead	Alternate	Curling club
Australia	Lynn Hewitt	Christine Traquair	Ellen Weir	Lyn Greenwood	Audrey Bedford	Victoria Curling Association
Japan	Mayumi Seguchi	Hidemi Itai	Akemi Niwa	Miyuki Nonomura	Mami Nishioka	
New Zealand	Helen Greer	Norma Francis	Christine Diack	Patsy Inder	Raewan McMillan	

=== Round Robin ===
Place	Country	Skip	(Japan)	(Australia)	(New Zealand)	Wins	Losses
1	Japan	Mayumi Seguchi	*	6:8; W:L	- -	?	?
2	Australia	Lynn Hewitt	8:6; L:W	*	W:L; W:L	3	1
3	New Zealand	Helen Greer	- -	L:W; L:W	*	?	?

Teams to playoffs

=== Playoffs ===
No any data about playoffs in WCF database.

=== Final standings ===
Place	Country	Skip	GP	W	L
1st place, gold medalist(s)	Japan	Mayumi Seguchi	?	?	?
2nd place, silver medalist(s)	Australia	Lynn Hewitt	?	?	?
3rd place, bronze medalist(s)	New Zealand	Helen Greer	?	?	?
