= Brian Johnson (curler) =

Australian curler

- Curler ♂

Team
- Curling club: New South Wales CC, Sydney Harbour CC, Sydney

Curling career
- Member Association: Australia
- World Championship: 3 (1993, 1994, 1995)
- Pacific-Asia Championship: 2 (1992, 1993)
Medal record
Curling
Pacific-Asia Championships
Gold medal – first place	1992 Karuizawa
Gold medal – first place	1993 Adelaide

Brian Johnson is an Australian curler. He is originally from Winnipeg, Manitoba.

At the international level, he is a two-time Pacific champion curler (1992, 1993).

== Teams and events ==
Season	Skip	Third	Second	Lead	Alternate	Events
1992–93	Hugh Millikin	Tom Kidd	Gerald Chick	Brian Johnson	Neil Galbraith	PCC 1992 (gold); WCC 1993 (6th)
1993–94	Hugh Millikin	Tom Kidd	Gerald Chick	Stephen Hewitt	Brian Johnson	PCC 1993 (gold); WCC 1994 (10th)
1994–95	Hugh Millikin	Stephen Johns	Gerald Chick	Stephen Hewitt	Brian Johnson	WCC 1995 (8th)
