= 1994 Pacific Curling Championships =

1994 Pacific Curling: Christchurch, New Zealand

- Host city: Christchurch, New Zealand
- Arena: Alpine Ice Sports Centre
- Dates: December 6–8
- Men's winner: Australia
- Curling club: New South Wales CC
- Skip: Hugh Millikin
- Third: Stephen Johns
- Second: Gerald Chick
- Lead: Stephen Hewitt
- Finalist: Japan (Shigenori Sato)
- Women's winner: Japan
- Curling club: Tokoro CC
- Skip: Ayako Ishigaki
- Third: Yukari Kondo
- Second: Emi Fujita
- Lead: Akiko Katoh
- Alternate: Ayumi Onodera
- Coach: Tetsu Eda
- Finalist: Australia (Ellen Weir)

The 1994 Pacific Curling Championships were held from December 6 to 8 at the Alpine Ice Sports Centre in Christchurch, New Zealand.

Australia won the men's event over Japan (it was the fourth Pacific title for the Australian men). On the women's side, Japan defeated Australia in the final (it was the third Pacific title for the Japanese women).

By virtue of winning, the Australian men's team and the Japanese women's team qualified for the 1995 World Men's and Women's Curling Championships in Brandon, Manitoba, Canada.

== Men ==
=== Teams ===
Country	Skip	Third	Second	Lead	Alternate	Coach	Curling club
Australia	Hugh Millikin	Stephen Johns	Gerald Chick	Stephen Hewitt			New South Wales CC
Japan	Shigenori Sato	Yoshiyuki Ohmiya	Yoshihiro Imahashi	Toshio Yano	Takahiro Sekine	Shuji Abe	Tokoro CC
New Zealand	Peter Becker	Barry Brown	Ross A. Stevens	Richard Morgan	John Campbell	Edwin Harley	Ranfurly CC

=== Round robin ===
Place	Country	Skip	(Australia)	(Japan)	(New Zealand)	Wins	Losses
1	Australia	Hugh Millikin	*	8:4; 11:0	7:4; 13:3	4	0
2	Japan	Shigenori Sato	4:8; 0:11	*	12:2; 9:7	2	2
3	New Zealand	Peter Becker	4:7; 3:13	2:12; 7:9	*	0	4

Teams to final

=== Final ===
Team	1	2	3	4	5	6	7	8	9	10	Final
Australia (Hugh Millikin) 🔨											6
Japan (Shigenori Sato)											4

=== Final standings ===
Place	Country	Skip	GP	W	L
1st place, gold medalist(s)	Australia	Hugh Millikin	5	5	0
2nd place, silver medalist(s)	Japan	Shigenori Sato	5	2	3
3rd place, bronze medalist(s)	New Zealand	Peter Becker	4	0	4

== Women ==
=== Teams ===
Country	Skip	Third	Second	Lead	Alternate	Coach	Curling club
Australia	Ellen Weir	Lyn Greenwood	Daryl Davies	Rhonda Shallcross			Victoria Curling Association
Japan	Ayako Ishigaki	Yukari Kondo	Emi Fujita	Akiko Katoh	Ayumi Onodera	Tetsu Eda	Tokoro CC
New Zealand	Helen Greer	Christine Diack	Norma Francis	Helen Rutherford	Heather Casey	Stewart Francis	Pioneer CC

=== Round robin ===
Place	Country	Skip	(Japan)	(Australia)	(New Zealand)	Wins	Losses
1	Japan	Ayako Ishigaki	*	14:6; 6:5	11:2; 13:2	4	0
2	Australia	Ellen Weir	6:14; 5:6	*	11:3; 13:1	2	2
3	New Zealand	Helen Greer	2:11; 2:13	3:11; 1:13	*	0	4

Teams to final

=== Final ===
Team	1	2	3	4	5	6	7	8	9	10	Final
Japan (Ayako Ishigaki)											12
Australia (Ellen Weir)											1

=== Final standings ===
Place	Country	Skip	GP	W	L
1st place, gold medalist(s)	Japan	Ayako Ishigaki	5	5	0
2nd place, silver medalist(s)	Australia	Ellen Weir	5	2	3
3rd place, bronze medalist(s)	New Zealand	Helen Greer	4	0	4
