= Gerald Chick =

Australian male curler and coach

- Curler ♂
- Born: c. 1965; Winnipeg, Manitoba

Team
- Curling club: New South Wales CC, Victoria Curling Association, Sydney Harbour CC, Sydney

Curling career
- Member Association: Manitoba (1982-1985); Ontario (1987-88); Australia (1990-present)
- World Championship: 5 (1993, 1994, 1995, 1996, 1997)
- World Mixed Doubles Championship: 2 (2008, 2009)
- World Mixed Championship: 3 (2018, 2023, 2024)
- Pacific-Asia Championship: 8 (1992, 1993, 1994, 1995, 1996, 1998, 1999, 2000)
- Other appearances: World Junior Championships: 1 (1985), World Senior Championships: 1 (2016)
Medal record
Curling
Representing Australia
Pacific-Asia Championships
Gold medal – first place	1992 Karuizawa
Gold medal – first place	1993 Adelaide
Gold medal – first place	1994 Christchurch
Gold medal – first place	1995 Tokoro
Gold medal – first place	1996 Sydney
Silver medal – second place	1999 Tokoro
Silver medal – second place	2000 Esquimalt
Bronze medal – third place	1998 Qualicum Beach
Representing Canada
World Junior Championships
Gold medal – first place	1985 Perth

Gerald Chick (born c. 1965) is a Canadian-Australian curler and curling coach. He is originally from Winnipeg. As of 1996, he was living in Melbourne. He moved to Australia in 1990, and joined the Australian team as their coach, until he was eligible to curl for the country in 1992.

At the international level, he is a five-time Pacific champion curler (1992, 1993, 1994, 1995, 1996).

== Awards and honours ==
- Manitoba Sports Hall of Fame: 2016 (with other teammates from "Team Ursel", who won 1985 World Junior Championships).

== Teams and events ==
=== Men's ===
Season	Skip	Third	Second	Lead	Alternate	Coach	Events
1982–83	Bob Ursel	Scott Westman	Gerald Chick	Mike Ursel			CJCC 1983
1983–84	Bob Ursel	Brent Mendella	Gerald Chick	Mike Ursel			CJCC 1984 (gold)
1984–85	Bob Ursel	Brent Mendella	Gerald Chick	Mike Ursel			WJCC 1985 (gold)
1987–88	Ted Brown	Al Smith	Gerald Chick	Wayne Appleton			1988 Ont.
1992–93	Hugh Millikin	Tom Kidd	Gerald Chick	Brian Johnson	Neil Galbraith		PCC 1992 (gold); WCC 1993 (6th)
1993–94	Hugh Millikin	Tom Kidd	Gerald Chick	Stephen Hewitt	Brian Johnson		PCC 1993 (gold); WCC 1994 (10th)
1994–95	Hugh Millikin	Stephen Johns	Gerald Chick	Stephen Hewitt	Brian Johnson (WCC)		PCC 1994 (gold); WCC 1995 (8th)
1995–96	Hugh Millikin	Stephen Johns	Gerald Chick	Andy Campbell	Stephen Hewitt (WCC)		PCC 1995 (gold); WCC 1996 (10th)
1996–97	Hugh Millikin	Gerald Chick	Stephen Johns	Stephen Hewitt	Jonathan Wade (WCC)		PCC 1996 (gold); WCC 1997 (7th)
1998–99	Hugh Millikin	Stephen Johns	John Theriault	Gerald Chick			PCC 1998 (bronze)
1999–00	Hugh Millikin	John Theriault	Gerald Chick	Stephen Johns			PCC 1999 (silver)
2000–01	Hugh Millikin	Gerald Chick	John Theriault	Stephen Johns			PCC 2000 (silver)
2010–11	Gerald Chick	Matt Panoussi	Paul Meissner	Vaughan Rosier			AMCC 2010 (silver)
2015–16	Gerald Chick	Tim McMahon	David Imlah	Rob Gagnon	Wyatt Buck	Wyatt Buck	WSCC 2016 (15th)

=== Mixed ===
Season	Skip	Third	Second	Lead	Coach	Events
2018–19	Matt Panoussi	Jennifer Westhagen	Gerald Chick	Stephanie Barr	Jamie Scholz (WMxCC)	AMxCC 2018 (gold); WMxCC 2018 (19th)

=== Mixed doubles ===
Season	Male	Female	Events
2007–08	Gerald Chick	Jennifer Thomas	WMDCC 2008 (17th)
2008–09	Gerald Chick	Jennifer Thomas	WMDCC 2009 (23rd)

== Record as a coach of national teams ==
Year	Tournament, event	National team	Place
2003	2003 Pacific Curling Championships	Australia (women)	4
