= Akiko Sekiwa =

Japanese curler

- Curler ♀
- Born: Akiko Katoh; April 6, 1978 (age 48); Tokoro, Hokkaido, Japan

Team
- Curling club: Obihiro CC, Obihiro & Tokoro CC

Curling career
- Member Association: Japan
- World Championship: 5 (1996, 1997, 1998, 1999, 2001)
- Pacific-Asia Championship: 5 (1994, 1996, 1997, 1998, 2001)
- Olympic: 2 (1998, 2002)
- Other appearances: World Junior Championships: 5 (1995, 1996, 1997, 1998, 1999)
Medal record
Curling
Pacific-Asia Championships
Gold medal – first place	1994 Christchurch
Gold medal – first place	1996 Sydney
Gold medal – first place	1997 Karuizawa
Gold medal – first place	1998 Qualicum Beach
Silver medal – second place	2001 Jeonju
Japan Women's Championship
Gold medal – first place	1997 Karuizawa
Gold medal – first place	1998 Tokoro
Gold medal – first place	1999 Tokoro
Gold medal – first place	2001 Tokoro
Silver medal – second place	2000 Karuizawa
World Junior Championships
Silver medal – second place	1998 Thunder Bay
Silver medal – second place	1999 Östersund

Akiko Sekiwa (Japanese: 関和 章子; born April 6, 1978, in Tokoro, Hokkaido, Japan as Akiko Katoh, Japanese: 加藤 章子) is a Japanese curler and curling coach, a four-time Pacific-Asian champion (1994, 1996, 1997, 1998) and a four-time Japan women's champion (1997, 1998, 1999, 2001).

She played for Japan at the 1998 Winter Olympics, where the Japanese team finished in fifth place. Also, she competed at the 2002 Winter Olympics, where the Japanese team finished in eighth place.

== Awards ==
- World Junior Curling Championships All-Star Team, Women: 1998

== Teams ==
Season	Skip	Third	Second	Lead	Alternate	Coach	Events
1994–95	Ayako Ishigaki	Yukari Kondo	Emi Fujita	Akiko Katoh	Ayumi Onodera	Tetsu Eda	PCC 1994 (gold)
1994–95	Mika Hori	Hitomi Suzuki	Fumiko Hirosawa	Kozue Hasegawa	Akiko Katoh		WJCC 1995 (7th)
1995–96	Akiko Katoh	Yumie Hayashi	Ayumi Onodera	Kiomi Ozawa	Mika Yoda		WJCC 1996 (5th)
1995–96	Ayako Ishigaki	Mayumi Ohkutsu	Yukari Kondo	Yoko Mimura	Akiko Katoh		WCC 1996 (6th)
1996–97	Akiko Katoh	Yumie Hayashi	Ayumi Onodera	Mika Hori	Ai Kobayashi		WJCC 1997 (5th)
1996–97	Mayumi Ohkutsu	Akiko Katoh	Yukari Kondo	Yoko Mimura	Akemi Niwa		PCC 1996 (gold); JWCC 1997 (gold); WCC 1997 (4th)
1997–98	Mayumi Ohkutsu	Akiko Katoh	Yukari Kondo	Akemi Niwa	Yoko Mimura		PCC 1997 (gold)
1997–98	Akiko Katoh	Yumie Hayashi	Ayumi Onodera	Mika Hori	Ai Kobayashi		WJCC 1998 (silver)
1997–98	Mayumi Ohkutsu	Akiko Katoh	Yukari Kondo	Yoko Mimura	Akemi Niwa	Elaine Dagg-Jackson	WOG 1998 (5th); JWCC 1998 (gold); WCC 1998 (8th)
1998–99	Akiko Katoh	Yumie Hayashi	Ayumi Onodera	Mika Hori	Akemi Niwa	Elaine Dagg-Jackson	PCC 1998 (gold)
1998–99	Akiko Katoh	Yumie Hayashi	Ayumi Onodera	Ai Kobayashi	Shinobu Aota	Elaine Dagg-Jackson	WJCC 1999 (silver)
1998–99	Akiko Katoh	Yumie Hayashi	Akemi Niwa	Ayumi Onodera	Mika Hori		JWCC 1999 (gold)
1998–99	Akiko Katoh	Akemi Niwa	Ayumi Onodera	Mika Hori	Yumie Hayashi	Elaine Dagg-Jackson	WCC 1999 (9th)
1999–00	Akiko Katoh	Yumie Hayashi	Ayumi Onodera	Mika Hori			JWCC 2000 (silver)
2000–01	Akiko Katoh	Yumie Hayashi	Ayumi Onodera	Mika Konaka	Yukari Okazaki (WCC)	Yoshiyuki Ohmiya	JWCC 2001 (gold); WCC 2001 (7th)
2001–02	Akiko Katoh	Yumie Hayashi	Ayumi Onodera	Mika Konaka	Kotomi Ishizaki	Yoshiyuki Ohmiya	PCC 2001 (silver); WOG 2002 (8th)

== Record as a coach of national teams ==
Year	Tournament, event	National team	Place
2003	2003 World Junior Curling Championships	Japan (junior women)	5
