= Neil Galbraith =

Australian curler

- Curler ♂

Team
- Curling club: New South Wales CC, Sydney Harbour CC, Sydney

Curling career
- Member Association: Australia
- World Championship: 1 (1993)
- Pacific-Asia Championship: 1 (1992)
- Other appearances: World Senior Championships: 2 (2003, 2005)
Medal record
Curling
Pacific-Asia Championships
Gold medal – first place	1992 Karuizawa

Neil Galbraith is an Australian curler.

At the international level, he is a 1992 Pacific champion curler.

== Teams and events ==
Season	Skip	Third	Second	Lead	Alternate	Events
1992–93	Hugh Millikin	Tom Kidd	Gerald Chick	Brian Johnson	Neil Galbraith	PCC 1992 (gold); WCC 1993 (6th)
2002–03	Lloyd Roberts	Neil Galbraith	Jim Oastler	Richard Leggat		WSCC 2003 (13th)
2004–05	Lloyd Roberts	Tom Kidd	Jim Oastler	Neil Galbraith		WSCC 2005 (19th)
