= Stephen Hewitt =

Australian curler

- Curler
- Born: 15 July 1958 (age 68); Melbourne, Australia

Team
- Curling club: Melbourne CC, New South Wales CC; Victoria Curling Association; Sydney Harbour CC, Sydney
- Skip: Hugh Millikin
- Fourth: Dean Hewitt
- Third: Tanner Davis
- Second: Steve Johns
- Alternate: Stephen Hewitt

Curling career
- Member Association: Australia
- World Championship: 8 (1992, 1994, 1995, 1996, 1997, 1998, 2005, 2008)
- Pacific-Asia Championship: 7 (1991, 1993, 1994, 1996, 2002, 2007, 2008)
- Pan Continental Championship: 1 (2024)
- Olympic: 1: (1992, demonstration)
- Other appearances: World Senior Championships: 2 (2012, 2013)
Medal record
Men's curling
Representing Australia
Pacific-Asia Championships
Gold medal – first place	1991 Sagamihara
Gold medal – first place	1993 Adelaide
Gold medal – first place	1994 Christchurch
Gold medal – first place	1996 Sydney
Silver medal – second place	2002 Queenstown
Silver medal – second place	2007 Beijing

Stephen "Steve" Hewitt (born 15 July 1958) is an Australian curler from Glen Waverley, Victoria.

At the international level, he is a four-time Pacific champion curler (1991, 1993, 1994, 1996).

He played for Australia at the 1992 Winter Olympics where curling was a demonstration event. There, the Australian men's team finished in seventh place.

Hewitt only began curling in 1988.

== Teams and events ==
Season	Skip	Third	Second	Lead	Alternate	Coach	Events
1991–92	Hugh Millikin	Tom Kidd	Daniel Joyce	Stephen Hewitt	Brian Stuart (PCC, WOG)		AMCC 1991 (gold); PCC 1991 (gold); WOG 1992 (demo) (7th); WCC 1992 (6th)
1993–94	Hugh Millikin	Tom Kidd	Gerald Chick	Stephen Hewitt	Brian Johnson		AMCC 1993 (gold); PCC 1993 (gold); WCC 1994 (10th)
1994–95	Hugh Millikin	Stephen Johns	Gerald Chick	Stephen Hewitt	Brian Johnson (WCC)		AMCC 1994 (gold); PCC 1994 (gold); WCC 1995 (8th)
1995–96	Hugh Millikin	Stephen Johns	Gerald Chick	Andy Campbell	Stephen Hewitt		WCC 1996 (10th)
1996–97	Hugh Millikin	Gerald Chick	Stephen Johns	Stephen Hewitt	Jonathan Wade (WCC)		AMCC 1996 (gold); PCC 1996 (gold); WCC 1997 (7th)
1997–98	Hugh Millikin	Trevor Schumm	John Theriault	Stephen Johns	Stephen Hewitt		WCC 1998 (9th)
2001–02	Gerald Chick	Mark Wuschke	Jonathan Wade	Stephen Hewitt			AMCC 2001 (silver)
2002–03	Hugh Millikin	Ian Palangio	John Theriault	Stephen Johns	Stephen Hewitt		AMCC 2002 (gold); PCC 2002 (silver)
2003–04	Ricky Tasker	Derril Palidwar	Rob Gagnon	Stephen Hewitt			AMCC 2003 (silver)
2004–05	Ian Palangio (Fourth)	Hugh Millikin (Skip)	John Theriault	Stephen Johns	Stephen Hewitt		WCC 2005 (10th)
2007–08	Ian Palangio (Fourth)	Hugh Millikin (Skip)	Sean Hall	Stephen Johns	Stephen Hewitt	Earle Morris (WCC), Rob Gagnon (PCC, WCC)	AMCC 2007 (gold); PCC 2007 (silver); WCC 2008 (10th)
2008–09	Ian Palangio (Fourth)	Hugh Millikin (Skip)	Sean Hall	Stephen Johns	Stephen Hewitt	Earle Morris	AMCC 2008 (gold); PCC 2008 (5th)
2011–12	Hugh Millikin	John Theriault	Stephen Hewitt	Rob Gagnon	Wyatt Buck		WSCC 2012 (7th)
2012–13	Hugh Millikin	Jim Allan	Stephen Hewitt	Dan Hogan	Wyatt Buck		WSCC 2013 (6th)
2024–25	Dean Hewitt (Fourth)	Stephen Johns	Stephen Hewitt	Hugh Millikin (Skip)			AMCC 2024 (gold)
2024–25	Dean Hewitt (Fourth)	Tanner Davis	Stephen Johns	Hugh Millikin (Skip)	Stephen Hewitt	Perry Marshall	PCCC 2024
