= Ayumi Ogasawara =

Japanese curler

- Curler
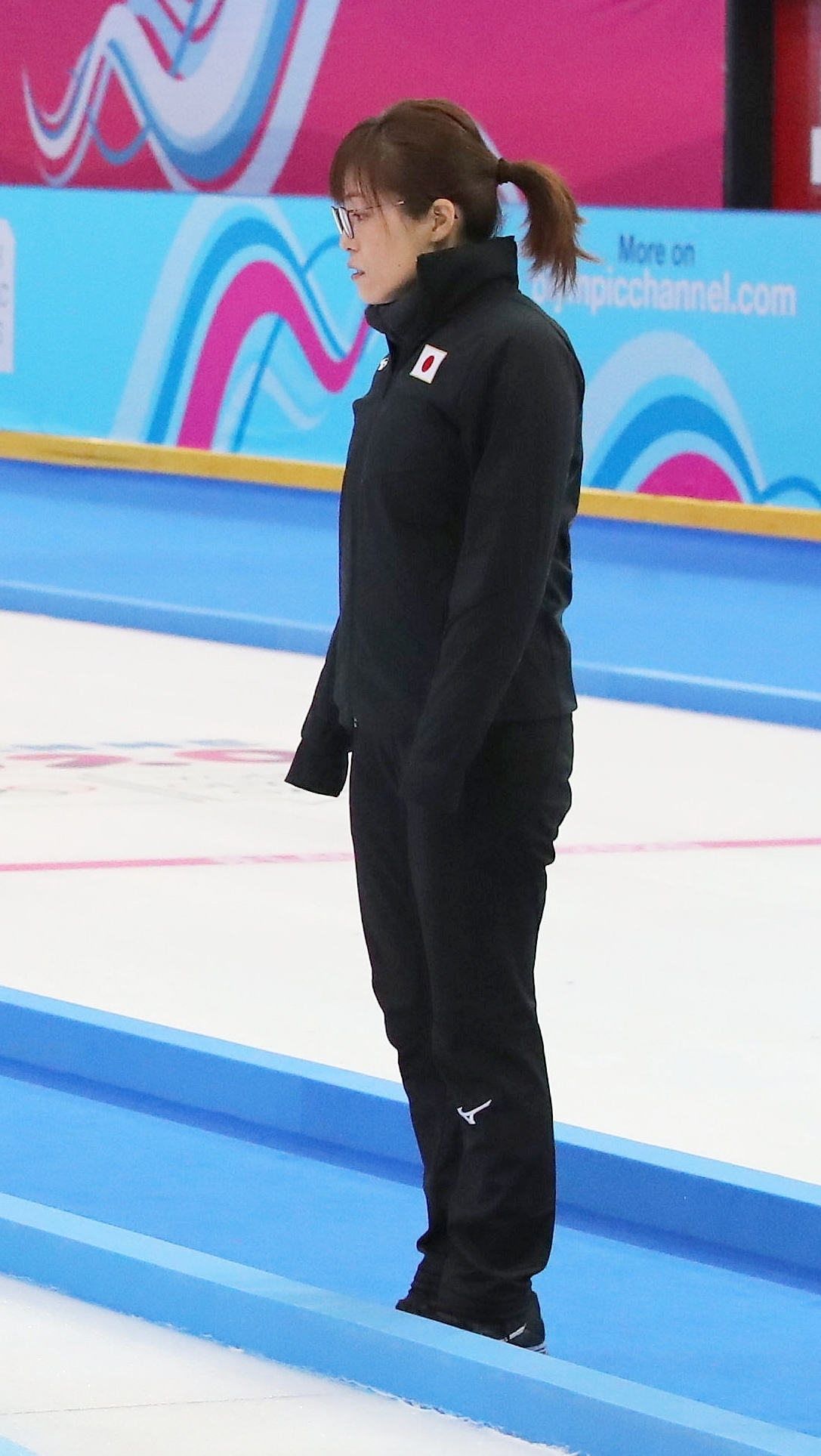
- Born: Ayumi Onodera; November 25, 1978 (age 47); Tokoro, Kitami, Hokkaido

Curling career
- World Championship: 4 (1999, 2001, 2005, 2015)
- World Mixed Doubles Championship: 1 (2017)
- Pacific-Asia Championship: 6 (1994, 1998, 2001, 2004, 2013, 2014)
- Olympic: 3 (2002, 2006, 2014)
- Other appearances: World Junior Championships: 4 (1996, 1997, 1998, 1999)
Medal record
Women's curling
Representing Japan
Pacific Championships
Gold medal – first place	1994 Christchurch
Gold medal – first place	1998 Qualicum Beach
Gold medal – first place	2004 Chuncheon
Silver medal – second place	2001 Jeonju
Bronze medal – third place	2013 Shanghai
Bronze medal – third place	2014 Karuizawa
World Junior Championships
Silver medal – second place	1998 Thunder Bay
Silver medal – second place	1999 Östersund

Ayumi Ogasawara (小笠原 歩, Ogasawara Ayumi) is a Japanese curler, born November 25, 1978, as Ayumi Onodera (小野寺 歩, Onodera Ayumi). She skipped her own team in Sapporo, Hokkaido, until 2015, which represented Japan at the 2014 Winter Olympics before retiring from competitive sports. Currently she is working as a curling coach.

== Career ==
At the age of 12, Ogasawara began curling in her hometown Tokoro, joining Akiko Katoh's junior team together with Yumie Hayashi. Then Ogasawara became the second for the team. The team represented Japan at four World Junior Curling Championships (1996, 1997, 1998 & 1999), winning a silver medal in 1998 and another silver in 1999. The team later represented Japan at the 2002 Winter Olympics, finishing in 8th place with a 2-7 record.

After the 2001-2002 season, Ogasawara and her longtime teammate Hayashi moved to Aomori and formed a new team there. The team, called 'Team Aomori', represented Japan at the 2006 Winter Olympics. At the Games, Ogasawara threw last stones as skip and led her team to a 7th-place finish with a 4-5 record, including a surprise win over one of the usual curling powerhouses, Canada. After the 2005-2006 season, Ogasawara and Hayashi announced their temporary retirement. Ogasawara got married and had a child before returning to the sport in the 2011-12 season.

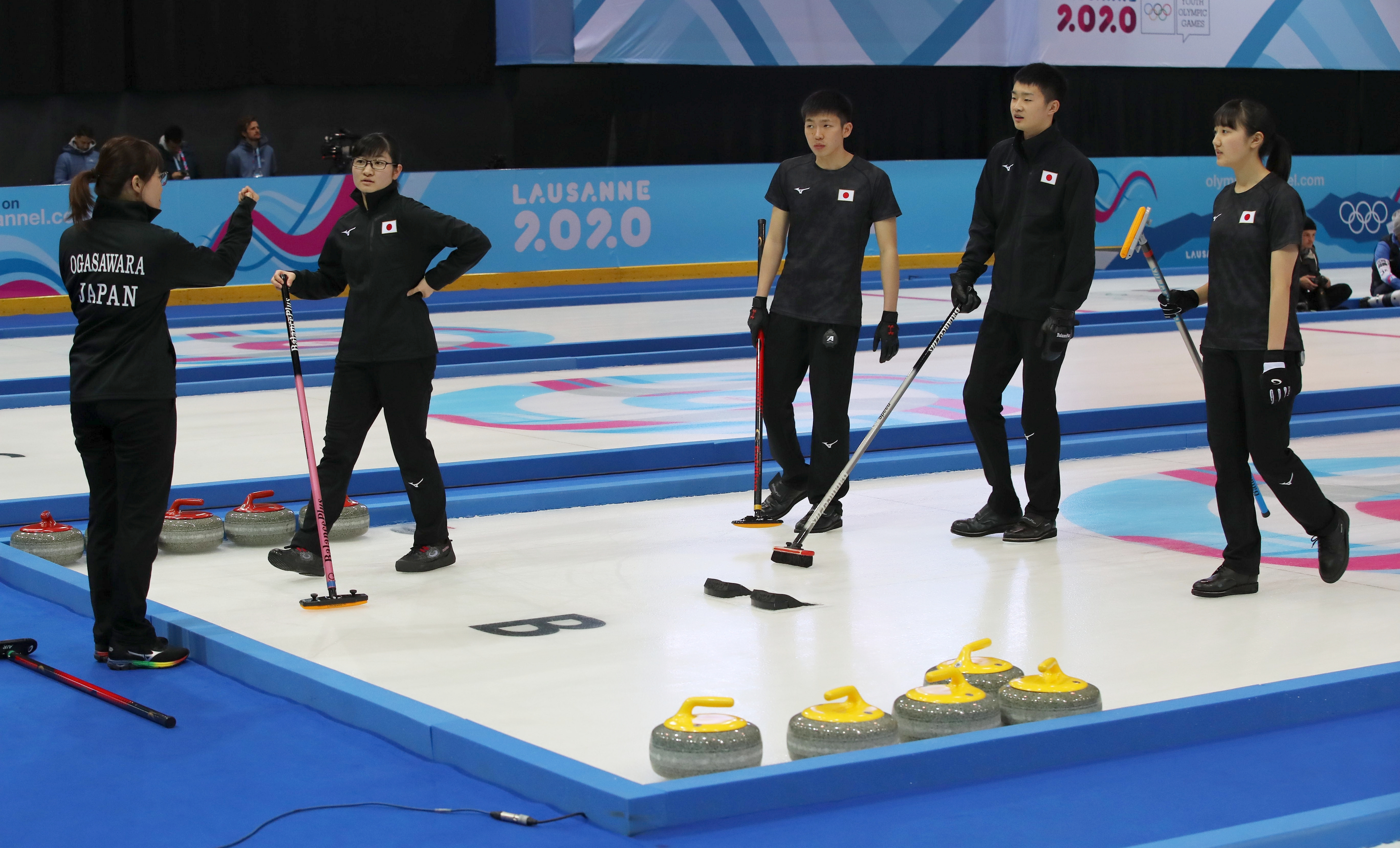
Ayumi Ogasawara as a coach of the Japanese national curling team at the 2020 Winter Youth Olympics

In 2011, Ogasawara and Hayashi, whose name had changed to Yumie Funayama after marriage, formed a new team in Sapporo. The team qualified for the 2014 Winter Olympics through the Olympic Qualification Event held in December 2013. At the Olympics, Ogasawara, a mother of one, was chosen to be Japan's flag bearer, as it is unusual for women in Japan to compete in sports after having children. At the Games, she threw last stones as skip, and the team finished in 5th place with a 4-5 record, winning against two former World Championship teams, Switzerland's Mirjam Ott and China's Wang Bingyu.

== Teammates ==
2002 Salt Lake City Olympic Games

- Akiko Katoh, Skip
- Yumie Hayashi, Third
- Mika Konaka, Lead
- Kotomi Ishizaki, Alternate

2006 Turin Olympic Games

- Yumie Hayashi, Third
- Mari Motohashi, Second
- Moe Meguro, Lead
- Sakurako Terada, Alternate

2014 Sochi Olympic Games

- Yumie Funayama, Third
- Kaho Onodera, Second
- Michiko Tomabechi, Lead
- Chinami Yoshida, Alternate

== Record as a coach of national teams ==
Year	Tournament, event	National team	Place
2019	2019 World Mixed Curling Championship	Japan (mixed)	24
2020	2020 Winter Youth Olympics (mixed)	Japan (mixed)	2nd place, silver medalist(s)
2020	2020 Winter Youth Olympics (mixed doubles); Mina Kobayashi (JPN) / Leo Tuaz (FRA)	Japan/France	4
2020	2020 Winter Youth Olympics (mixed doubles); Ērika Bitmete (LAT) / Takumi Maeda (JPN)	Latvia/Japan	7
2022	2022 World Junior Curling Championships (women)	Japan (women)	1st place, gold medalist(s)
2023	2023 World Junior Curling Championships (women)	Japan (women)	2nd place, silver medalist(s)
2023	2023 World Mixed Doubles Curling Championship	Japan	2nd place, silver medalist(s)

Olympic Games
Preceded by Tomomi Okazaki	Flagbearer for Japan; Sochi 2014	Succeeded by Noriaki Kasai; Sara Takanashi
