= Andy Campbell (curler) =

Australian curler

- Curler ♂

Team
- Curling club: Sydney Harbour CC, Sydney

Curling career
- Member Association: Australia
- World Championship: 1 (1996)
- Pacific-Asia Championship: 1 (1995)
Medal record
Curling
Pacific-Asia Championships
Gold medal – first place	1995 Tokoro

Andrew Campbell (born c. 1956) is an Australian curler from Melbourne. He is originally from Kenya, but grew up in Scotland.

At the international level, he is a 1995 Pacific champion curler.

At the national level, he is a 1995 Australian men's champion curler, lead for Hugh Millikin.

At the time of the 1996 Worlds, he was a personal recruitment consultant.

== Teams and events ==
Season	Skip	Third	Second	Lead	Alternate	Events
1994–95	Hugh Millikin	Stephen Johns	Gerald Chick	Andy Campbell		AMCC 1995 (gold)
1995–96	Hugh Millikin	Stephen Johns	Gerald Chick	Andy Campbell	Stephen Hewitt (WCC)	PCC 1995 (gold); WCC 1996 (10th)
