= 2017 Prestige Hotels & Resorts Curling Classic =

World Curling Tour event

- Host city: Vernon, British Columbia
- Arena: Vernon Curling Club
- Dates: September 29 - October 2
- Men's winner: (British Columbia) Jeff Guignard
- Curling club: Vancouver CC, Vancouver
- Skip: Jeff Guignard
- Third: Daniel Wenzek
- Second: Chris Faa
- Lead: Nicholas Meister
- Finalist: (British Columbia) Adam Cseke
- Women's winner: (Ontario) Rachel Homan
- Curling club: Ottawa CC, Ottawa
- Skip: Rachel Homan
- Third: Emma Miskew
- Second: Joanne Courtney
- Lead: Lisa Weagle
- Finalist: (South Korea) Gim Un-chi

The 2017 Prestige Hotels & Resorts Curling Classic was held from September 29 to October 2 at the Vernon Curling Club in Vernon, British Columbia as part of the 2017-18 World Curling Tour. The men's event was a triple knockout format, while the women's event was held in a round robin format.

== Men ==
=== Teams ===
Skip	Third	Second	Lead	Locale
Adam Cseke	Matt Tolley	Andrew Nerpin	Cam Weir	Victoria, British Columbia
Neil Dangerfield	Denis Sutton	Darren Boden	Glen Allen	Victoria, British Columbia
Jeff Guignard	Daniel Wenzek	Chris Faa	Nick Meister	Vancouver, British Columbia
Darryl Horsman	Jason Hallack	Tom Dukerich	Kent Groh	(United States) Phoenix, Arizona
Dean Joanisse	Paul Cseke	Jay Wakefield	John Cullen	Maple Ridge, British Columbia
Matthew McCrady	Breyden Carpenter	Nicholas Umbach	Jacob Umbach	New Westminster, British Columbia
Lyle Sieg	Fred Cleutinx	Carl Labreche	Kevin Jeannotte	New Westminster, British Columbia
Tyler Tardi	Sterling Middleton	Jordan Tardi	Zachary Curtis	Langley, British Columbia

=== Knockout results ===
The draw is listed as follows:

==== A event ====
Quarterfinals		Semifinals		Qualifier 1
(British Columbia) Dean Joanisse	8
(British Columbia) Lyle Sieg	3	(British Columbia) Dean Joanisse	3
(British Columbia) Jeff Guignard	4	(British Columbia) Jeff Guignard	8
(British Columbia) Matthew McCrady	3			(British Columbia) Jeff Guignard	7
(British Columbia) Tyler Tardi	7			(British Columbia) Tyler Tardi	4
(United States) Darryl Horsman	3	(British Columbia) Tyler Tardi	6
(British Columbia) Neil Dangerfield	2	(British Columbia) Adam Cseke	5
(British Columbia) Adam Cseke	4

==== B event ====
Round of 16
(British Columbia) Lyle Sieg	7
(British Columbia) Matthew McCrady	3
(United States) Darryl Horsman	4
(British Columbia) Neil Dangerfield	8

Quarterfinals
(British Columbia) Lyle Sieg	7
(British Columbia) Adam Ceske	8
(British Columbia) Neil Dangerfield	7
(British Columbia) Dean Joanisse	8

Semifinals
(British Columbia) Adam Cseke	5
(British Columbia) Dean Joanisse	4

Qualifier 2
(British Columbia) Adam Cseke	0
(British Columbia) Tyler Tardi	6

==== C event ====
Semifinals		Qualifier 3
		(British Columbia) Matthew McCrady	1
(British Columbia) Neil Dangerfield	3	(British Columbia) Dean Joanisse	5
(British Columbia) Matthew McCrady	6

Semifinals		Qualifier 4
		(British Columbia) Lyle Sieg	1
(British Columbia) Lyle Sieg	7	(British Columbia) Adam Cseke	5
(United States) Darryl Horsman	2

=== Playoffs ===
Semifinals		Final
(British Columbia) Jeff Guignard	8
(British Columbia) Dean Joanisse	6	(British Columbia) Jeff Guignard	4
(British Columbia) Tyler Tardi	4	(British Columbia) Adam Cseke	3
(British Columbia) Adam Cseke	6

== Women ==
=== Teams ===
Skip	Third	Second	Lead	Locale
Corryn Brown	Erin Pincott	Dezaray Hawes	Samantha Fisher	Kamloops, British Columbia
Chelsea Carey	Cathy Overton-Clapham	Jocelyn Peterman	Laine Peters	Calgary, Alberta
Holly Donaldson	Lindsay Hudyma	Steph Jackson-Baier	Carley Sandwith	Victoria / Vancouver, British Columbia
Gim Un-chi	Um Min-ji	Seol Ye-eun	Yeom Yoon-jung	Gyeonggi-do, South Korea
Diane Gushulak	Grace MacInnes	Jessie Sanderson	Sandra Comadina	New Westminster, British Columbia
Kayte Gyles	Shawna Jensen	Caitlin Campbell	Amanda Tipper	Cloverdale, British Columbia
Rachel Homan	Emma Miskew	Joanne Courtney	Lisa Weagle	Ottawa, Ontario
Shannon Kleibrink	Sarah Wilkes	Kalynn Park	Alison Thiessen	Calgary, Alberta
Patti Knezevic	Brette Richards	Blaine de Jager	Heather Jensen	Lake Country, British Columbia
Kim Slattery	Alyssa Kyllo (skip)	Kelsi Jones	Morgayne Eby	Vernon, British Columbia
Geri-Lynn Ramsay	Kelly Erickson	Brittany Tran	Claire Tully	Calgary, Alberta
Kelsey Rocque	Laura Crocker	Taylor McDonald	Jen Gates	Edmonton, Alberta
Nina Roth	Tabitha Peterson	Aileen Geving	Becca Hamilton	(United States) Blaine, Minnesota
Casey Scheidegger	Cary-Anne McTaggart	Jessie Scheidegger	Kristie Moore	Lethbridge, Alberta
Kelly Shimizu	Rebecca Stevenson	Michelle MacLeod	Mariah Coulombe	Richmond, British Columbia
Robyn Silvernagle	Jolene Campbell	Dayna Demers	Kara Thevenot	North Battleford, Saskatchewan
Jamie Sinclair	Alex Carlson	Vicky Persinger	Monica Walker	(United States) Blaine, Minnesota
Valerie Sweeting	Lori Olson-Johns	Dana Ferguson	Rachelle Brown	Edmonton, Alberta
Karla Thompson	Kristen Recksiedler	Shannon Joanisse	Trysta Vandale	Kamloops, British Columbia
Kesa Van Osch	Marika Van Osch	Kalia Van Osch	Amy Gibson	Nanaimo, British Columbia

=== Round-robin standings ===
Key
Teams to Playoffs

Red Group	W	L
(Ontario) Rachel Homan	5	0
(Alberta) Shannon Kleibrink	4	1
(British Columbia) Karla Thompson	3	2
(British Columbia) Patti Knezevic	1	4
(British Columbia) Kayte Gyles	1	4

Green Group	W	L
(Alberta) Chelsea Carey	5	0
(United States) Jamie Sinclair	3	2
(British Columbia) Corryn Brown	2	3
(Saskatchewan) Robyn Silvernagle	1	4
(British Columbia) Kim Slattery	0	5

Blue Group	W	L
(British Columbia) Diane Gushulak	4	1
(United States) Nina Roth	4	1
(Alberta) Valerie Sweeting	4	1
(Alberta) Geri-Lynn Ramsay	1	4
(British Columbia) Holly Donaldson	0	5

Purple Group	W	L
(South Korea) Gim Un-chi	4	1
(Alberta) Kelsey Rocque	4	1
(Alberta) Casey Scheidegger	3	2
(British Columbia) Kelly Shimizu	1	4
(British Columbia) Kesa Van Osch	0	5

== Playoffs ==
Quarterfinals
(Alberta) Chelsea Carey	6
(British Columbia) Diane Gushulak	5
(South Korea) Gim Un-chi	7
(Alberta) Valerie Sweeting	4
(Ontario) Rachel Homan	8
(United States) Nina Roth	3
(Alberta) Shannon Kleibrink	5
(Alberta) Kelsey Rocque	4

Semifinals
(Alberta) Chelsea Carey	5
(South Korea) Gim Un-chi	6
(Ontario) Rachel Homan	6
(Alberta) Shannon Kleibrink	5

Final
(South Korea) Gim Un-chi	4
(Ontario) Rachel Homan	10
