= 1998 World Junior Curling Championships =

- Host city: Thunder Bay, Ontario, Canada
- Arena: Thunder Bay Tournament Centre
- Dates: March 21–29, 1998
- Men's winner: Canada
- Skip: John Morris
- Third: Craig Savill
- Second: Andy Ormsby
- Lead: Brent Laing
- Alternate: Brad Gushue
- Coach: Earle Morris
- Finalist: Scotland (Garry MacKay)
- Women's winner: Canada
- Skip: Melissa McClure
- Third: Nancy Toner
- Second: Brigitte McClure
- Lead: Bethany Toner
- Alternate: Julie Webb
- Finalist: Japan (Akiko Katoh)

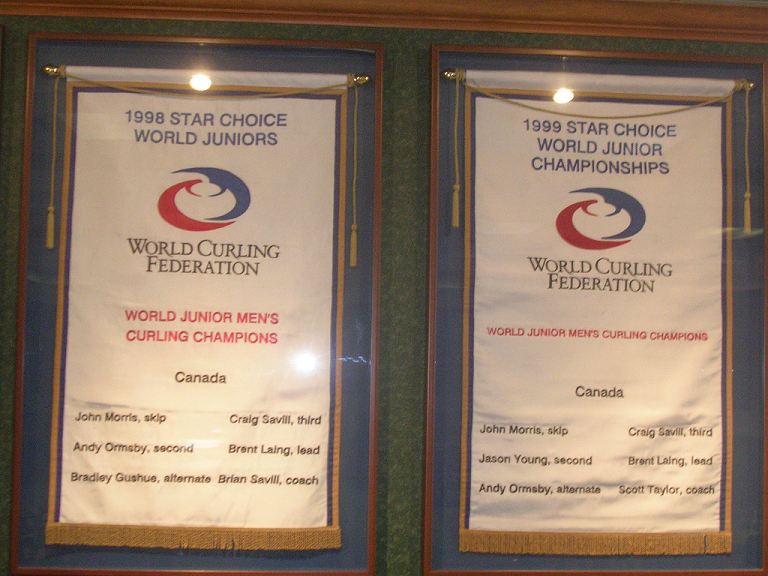
1998 World Junior Men's Championship banner (left) awarded to Team Canada.

The 1998 STAR CHOICE World Junior Curling Championships were held in Thunder Bay, Ontario, Canada March 21–29.

== Men's ==
Country	Skip	Wins	Losses
Canada	John Morris	9	0
Germany	Sebastian Stock	6	3
Scotland	Garry MacKay	6	3
Switzerland	Ralph Stöckli	6	3
Japan	Makoto Tsuruga	5	4
Sweden	Henrik Edlund	5	4
United States	Andy Roza	5	4
England	Mark Copperwheat	2	7
Denmark	Kasper Wiksten	1	8
Finland	Juha Pekaristo	0	9

=== Playoffs ===
Semi-final
1	Canada	9
4	Switzerland	3
2	Germany	4
3	Scotland	9

Final
1	Canada	5
3	Scotland	3
Bronze medal
2	Germany	4
4	Switzerland	6

== Women's ==
Country	Skip	Wins	Losses
Japan	Akiko Katoh	8	1
Canada	Melissa McClure	7	2
Scotland	Julia Ewart	6	3
Sweden	Matilda Mattsson	5	4
United States	Hope Schmitt	5	4
Switzerland	Silvana Tirinzoni	4	5
France	Audé Bénier	4	5
Norway	Marianne Rørvik	3	6
Germany	Katja Weisser	2	7
Denmark	Louise Jensen	0	9

=== Tiebreaker ===
- Sweden 11-2 United States

=== Playoffs ===
Semi-final
1	Japan	8
4	Sweden	7
2	Canada	6
3	Scotland	4

Final
1	Japan	3
2	Canada	11
Bronze medal
3	Scotland	5
4	Sweden	6

== Sources ==
- Men's results from the World Curling Federation
- Women's results from the World Curling Federation
