= 2021 Alberta Curling Series: Saville Shoot-Out =

- Host city: Edmonton, Alberta
- Arena: Saville Community Sports Centre
- Dates: September 10–13
- Winner: (South Korea) Team Kim
- Curling club: Gangneung CC, Gangneung
- Skip: Kim Eun-jung
- Third: Kim Kyeong-ae
- Second: Kim Cho-hi
- Lead: Kim Seon-yeong
- Alternate: Kim Yeong-mi
- Coach: Peter Gallant, Lim Myung-sup
- Finalist: (Alberta) Laura Walker

The 2021 Alberta Curling Series: Saville Shoot-Out was held from September 10 to 13 at the Saville Community Sports Centre in Edmonton, Alberta. It was held as part of the Alberta Curling Series during the 2021–22 curling season. The event was held in a round-robin format with a $19,155 purse.

== Teams ==
The teams are listed as follows:

Skip	Third	Second	Lead	Alternate	Locale
Sherry Anderson	Nancy Martin	Chaelynn Kitz	Breanne Knapp		Saskatoon, Saskatchewan
Ryleigh Bakker	Madison Johnson	Kaitlyn Zeiler	Cameron Kuzma	Sydney Libbus	Calgary, Alberta
Brett Barber	Alyssa Kostyk	Krystal Englot	Mackenzie Schwartz		Biggar, Saskatchewan
Lindsay Bertsch	Nicole Larson	Valerie Ekelund	Hope Sunley		Calgary, Alberta
Claire Booth	Kaylee Raniseth	Raelyn Helston	Kate Ector		Red Deer, Alberta
Corryn Brown	Erin Pincott	Dezaray Hawes	Samantha Fisher		Kamloops, British Columbia
Chelsea Carey	Jolene Campbell	Rachel Erickson (Note: Alternate Rachel Erickson moved up to play second, replacing Stephanie Schmidt.)	Jennifer Armstrong		Regina, Saskatchewan
Elysa Crough	Quinn Prodaniuk	Kim Bonneau	Julianna Mackenzie		Edmonton, Alberta
Kerri Einarson	Val Sweeting	Shannon Birchard	Briane Meilleur		Gimli, Manitoba
Serena Gray-Withers	Zoe Cinnamon	Brianna Cullen	Emma Wiens	Anna Munroe	Edmonton, Alberta
Rachel Homan	Emma Miskew	Sarah Wilkes	Joanne Courtney		Ottawa, Ontario
Jessie Hunkin (Note: As skip Robyn Silvernagle was on maternity leave, second Jessie Hunkin moved up to skip and alternate Becca Hebert played second.)	Kristen Streifel	Becca Hebert	Dayna Demers		North Battleford, Saskatchewan
Daniela Jentsch	Emira Abbes	Mia Höhne (Note: Alternate Mia Höhne moved up to play second, replacing Klara-Hermine Fomm.)	Analena Jentsch		Füssen, Germany
Kim Eun-jung	Kim Kyeong-ae	Kim Cho-hi	Kim Seon-yeong	Kim Yeong-mi	Gangneung, South Korea
Melissa Pierce	Jennifer Van Wieren	Megan Anderson	Kelly Erickson		Edmonton, Alberta
Darcy Robertson	Laura Burtnyk	Gaetanne Gauthier	Krysten Karwacki		Winnipeg, Manitoba
Kelsey Rocque	Danielle Schmiemann	Dana Ferguson	Rachelle Brown		Edmonton, Alberta
Casey Scheidegger	Cary-Anne McTaggart	Jessie Haughian	Kristie Moore		Lethbridge, Alberta
Marla Sherrer	Chantele Broderson	Julie Selvais	Sarah Drummond		Lacombe, Alberta
Kayla Skrlik	Geri-Lynn Ramsay	Brittany Tran	Ashton Skrlik		Calgary, Alberta
Kellie Stiksma	Ocean Pletz	Jamie Scott	Bailey Horte	Sara McMann	Edmonton, Alberta
Selena Sturmay	Abby Marks	Catherine Clifford	Paige Papley	Kate Goodhelpsen	Edmonton, Alberta
Laura Walker	Kate Cameron	Taylor McDonald	Heather Rogers (Note: Heather Rogers spared for Nadine Scotland.)		Edmonton, Alberta
Sarah Wark	Kristen Pilote	Nicky Kaufman	Karla Thompson		Abbotsford, British Columbia
Mackenzie Zacharias	Karlee Burgess	Emily Zacharias	Lauren Lenentine		Altona, Manitoba

== Round-robin standings ==
Final round-robin standings

Key
Teams to Playoffs
Teams to Tiebreakers

Pool A	W	L
(Manitoba) Kerri Einarson	4	0
(Alberta) Casey Scheidegger	3	1
(Saskatchewan) Chelsea Carey	2	2
(Saskatchewan) Brett Barber	1	3
(Alberta) Melissa Pierce	0	4

Pool B	W	L
(Ontario) Rachel Homan	4	0
(Manitoba) Darcy Robertson	3	1
(Saskatchewan) Sherry Anderson	2	2
(Alberta) Kellie Stiksma	1	3
(Alberta) Ryleigh Bakker	0	4

Pool C	W	L
(South Korea) Kim Eun-jung	4	0
(Manitoba) Mackenzie Zacharias	3	1
(Alberta) Elysa Crough	1	3
(Saskatchewan) Team Silvernagle	1	3
(Alberta) Selena Sturmay	1	3

Pool D	W	L
(Alberta) Kelsey Rocque	4	0
(Germany) Daniela Jentsch	3	1
(Alberta) Lindsay Bertsch	1	3
(Alberta) Serena Gray-Withers	1	3
(Alberta) Marla Sherrer	1	3

Pool E	W	L
(British Columbia) Corryn Brown	4	0
(Alberta) Laura Walker	3	1
(British Columbia) Sarah Wark	2	2
(Alberta) Kayla Skrlik	1	3
(Alberta) Claire Booth	0	4

== Round-robin results ==
All draw times listed in Mountain Time (UTC−06:00).

=== Draw 1 ===
Friday, September 10, 10:00 am

Sheet 1	1	2	3	4	5	6	7	8	Final
(Alberta) Melissa Pierce	0	0	0	0	0	X	X	X	0
(Alberta) Casey Scheidegger	1	1	4	0	1	X	X	X	7

Sheet 3	1	2	3	4	5	6	7	8	Final
(Alberta) Kellie Stiksma	0	0	1	1	0	1	0	1	4
(Manitoba) Darcy Robertson	3	2	0	0	1	0	2	0	8

Sheet 5	1	2	3	4	5	6	7	8	Final
(Alberta) Selena Sturmay	0	2	0	1	0	3	X	X	6
(Saskatchewan) Team Silvernagle	1	0	0	0	1	0	X	X	2

Sheet 7	1	2	3	4	5	6	7	8	9	Final
(Alberta) Marla Sherrer	0	1	1	1	0	0	0	1	0	4
(Alberta) Lindsay Bertsch	1	0	0	0	1	1	1	0	2	6

Sheet 9	1	2	3	4	5	6	7	8	Final
(Alberta) Kayla Skrlik	0	2	0	2	0	0	1	0	5
(British Columbia) Sarah Wark	1	0	1	0	1	1	0	2	6

Sheet 2	1	2	3	4	5	6	7	8	Final
(Saskatchewan) Brett Barber	0	0	3	0	X	X	X	X	3
(Saskatchewan) Chelsea Carey	2	2	0	5	X	X	X	X	9

Sheet 4	1	2	3	4	5	6	7	8	Final
(Alberta) Ryleigh Bakker	0	0	0	1	0	0	X	X	1
(Saskatchewan) Sherry Anderson	3	1	2	0	0	2	X	X	8

Sheet 6	1	2	3	4	5	6	7	8	Final
(Alberta) Elysa Crough	0	2	0	0	0	X	X	X	2
(Manitoba) Mackenzie Zacharias	3	0	0	1	2	X	X	X	6

Sheet 8	1	2	3	4	5	6	7	8	Final
(Alberta) Serena Gray-Withers	0	0	0	0	1	0	2	X	3
(Germany) Daniela Jentsch	0	1	1	1	0	2	0	X	5

Sheet 10	1	2	3	4	5	6	7	8	Final
(Alberta) Claire Booth	0	1	0	0	1	0	0	X	2
(British Columbia) Corryn Brown	2	0	0	1	0	2	4	X	9

=== Draw 2 ===
Friday, September 10, 5:00 pm

Sheet 1	1	2	3	4	5	6	7	8	Final
(Saskatchewan) Team Silvernagle	0	1	1	1	2	3	X	X	8
(Alberta) Elysa Crough 🔨	1	0	0	0	0	0	X	X	1

Sheet 3	1	2	3	4	5	6	7	8	Final
(British Columbia) Sarah Wark 🔨	3	4	0	2	0	4	X	X	13
(Alberta) Claire Booth	0	0	3	0	2	0	X	X	5

Sheet 5	1	2	3	4	5	6	7	8	Final
(Alberta) Casey Scheidegger 🔨	3	3	3	0	X	X	X	X	9
(Saskatchewan) Brett Barber	0	0	0	1	X	X	X	X	1

Sheet 7	1	2	3	4	5	6	7	8	Final
(Manitoba) Darcy Robertson 🔨	3	0	5	1	0	1	X	X	10
(Alberta) Ryleigh Bakker	0	1	0	0	1	0	X	X	2

Sheet 9	1	2	3	4	5	6	7	8	9	Final
(Alberta) Lindsay Bertsch 🔨	1	0	1	0	3	0	2	0	0	7
(Alberta) Serena Gray-Withers	0	2	0	2	0	2	0	1	2	9

Sheet 2	1	2	3	4	5	6	7	8	Final
(South Korea) Kim Eun-jung	2	1	0	2	0	2	3	X	10
(Alberta) Selena Sturmay 🔨	0	0	1	0	3	0	0	X	4

Sheet 4	1	2	3	4	5	6	7	8	Final
(Alberta) Laura Walker 🔨	1	2	1	0	3	X	X	X	7
(Alberta) Kayla Skrlik	0	0	0	1	0	X	X	X	1

Sheet 6	1	2	3	4	5	6	7	8	9	Final
(Manitoba) Kerri Einarson	1	0	0	2	0	0	2	0	1	6
(Alberta) Melissa Pierce 🔨	0	1	0	0	1	1	0	2	0	5

Sheet 8	1	2	3	4	5	6	7	8	Final
(Ontario) Rachel Homan 🔨	2	2	0	5	X	X	X	X	9
(Alberta) Kellie Stiksma	0	0	1	0	X	X	X	X	1

Sheet 10	1	2	3	4	5	6	7	8	Final
(Alberta) Kelsey Rocque 🔨	2	1	0	1	1	0	3	X	8
(Alberta) Marla Sherrer	0	0	1	0	0	1	0	X	2

=== Draw 3 ===
Saturday, September 11, 10:00 am

Sheet 1	1	2	3	4	5	6	7	8	Final
(Saskatchewan) Sherry Anderson	1	0	3	0	0	0	3	X	7
(Alberta) Kellie Stiksma 🔨	0	1	0	0	1	1	0	X	3

Sheet 3	1	2	3	4	5	6	7	8	Final
(Germany) Daniela Jentsch 🔨	0	2	1	5	X	X	X	X	8
(Alberta) Marla Sherrer	0	0	0	0	X	X	X	X	0

Sheet 5	1	2	3	4	5	6	7	8	Final
(British Columbia) Corryn Brown	0	2	1	0	1	2	0	X	6
(Alberta) Kayla Skrlik 🔨	1	0	0	2	0	0	1	X	4

Sheet 7	1	2	3	4	5	6	7	8	Final
(Manitoba) Mackenzie Zacharias 🔨	1	1	1	2	0	2	0	X	7
(Alberta) Selena Sturmay	0	0	0	0	2	0	2	X	4

Sheet 9	1	2	3	4	5	6	7	8	Final
(Saskatchewan) Chelsea Carey 🔨	0	2	0	1	0	2	0	0	5
(Alberta) Melissa Pierce	0	0	1	0	0	0	3	0	4

Sheet 2	1	2	3	4	5	6	7	8	Final
(Manitoba) Darcy Robertson 🔨	1	0	1	0	0	0	X	X	2
(Ontario) Rachel Homan	0	2	0	2	2	1	X	X	7

Sheet 4	1	2	3	4	5	6	7	8	Final
(Alberta) Lindsay Bertsch 🔨	2	0	1	0	0	0	0	0	3
(Alberta) Kelsey Rocque	0	1	0	1	1	2	1	1	7

Sheet 6	1	2	3	4	5	6	7	8	Final
(British Columbia) Sarah Wark	0	1	0	0	1	0	1	1	4
(Alberta) Laura Walker 🔨	0	0	2	2	0	1	0	0	5

Sheet 8	1	2	3	4	5	6	7	8	Final
(Saskatchewan) Team Silvernagle 🔨	0	0	2	0	0	1	0	X	3
(South Korea) Kim Eun-jung	1	1	0	1	2	0	2	X	7

Sheet 10	1	2	3	4	5	6	7	8	Final
(Alberta) Casey Scheidegger	0	2	0	0	0	0	1	X	3
(Manitoba) Kerri Einarson 🔨	1	0	0	3	1	1	0	X	6

=== Draw 4 ===
Saturday, September 11, 5:00 pm

Sheet 1	1	2	3	4	5	6	7	8	Final
(Alberta) Serena Gray-Withers 🔨	0	4	0	0	1	0	2	0	7
(Alberta) Kelsey Rocque	1	0	3	1	0	1	0	2	8

Sheet 3	1	2	3	4	5	6	7	8	Final
(Saskatchewan) Brett Barber 🔨	0	0	1	0	1	0	X	X	2
(Manitoba) Kerri Einarson	0	3	0	3	0	2	X	X	8

Sheet 5	1	2	3	4	5	6	7	8	Final
(Alberta) Ryleigh Bakker	0	1	1	0	1	0	2	0	5
(Ontario) Rachel Homan 🔨	1	0	0	2	0	2	0	1	6

Sheet 7	1	2	3	4	5	6	7	8	Final
(Alberta) Claire Booth 🔨	0	0	0	2	0	0	X	X	2
(Alberta) Laura Walker	1	2	3	0	2	1	X	X	9

Sheet 9	1	2	3	4	5	6	7	8	Final
(Alberta) Elysa Crough	0	1	1	0	0	0	0	X	2
(South Korea) Kim Eun-jung 🔨	2	0	0	0	0	2	2	X	6

Sheet 2	1	2	3	4	5	6	7	8	Final
(Germany) Daniela Jentsch 🔨	0	2	3	0	3	X	X	X	8
(Alberta) Lindsay Bertsch	0	0	0	1	0	X	X	X	1

Sheet 4	1	2	3	4	5	6	7	8	Final
(Saskatchewan) Chelsea Carey 🔨	2	0	0	0	0	X	X	X	2
(Alberta) Casey Scheidegger	0	2	3	2	1	X	X	X	8

Sheet 6	1	2	3	4	5	6	7	8	Final
(Saskatchewan) Sherry Anderson	0	1	0	1	1	1	0	0	4
(Manitoba) Darcy Robertson 🔨	2	0	3	0	0	0	1	2	8

Sheet 8	1	2	3	4	5	6	7	8	Final
(British Columbia) Corryn Brown 🔨	2	0	1	0	3	2	X	X	8
(British Columbia) Sarah Wark	0	1	0	1	0	0	X	X	2

Sheet 10	1	2	3	4	5	6	7	8	Final
(Manitoba) Mackenzie Zacharias 🔨	1	1	1	0	1	0	3	X	7
(Saskatchewan) Team Silvernagle	0	0	0	2	0	1	0	X	3

=== Draw 5 ===
Sunday, September 12, 10:00 am

Sheet 1	1	2	3	4	5	6	7	8	Final
(Alberta) Laura Walker	0	0	1	0	0	0	1	X	2
(British Columbia) Corryn Brown 🔨	0	1	0	2	0	1	0	X	4

Sheet 3	1	2	3	4	5	6	7	8	Final
(South Korea) Kim Eun-jung 🔨	0	2	0	1	0	0	1	1	5
(Manitoba) Mackenzie Zacharias	1	0	1	0	0	1	0	0	3

Sheet 5	1	2	3	4	5	6	7	8	Final
(Alberta) Kelsey Rocque	0	0	3	2	0	2	0	X	7
(Germany) Daniela Jentsch 🔨	0	1	0	0	2	0	1	X	4

Sheet 7	1	2	3	4	5	6	7	8	Final
(Manitoba) Kerri Einarson 🔨	2	1	1	3	0	1	X	X	8
(Saskatchewan) Chelsea Carey	0	0	0	0	2	0	X	X	2

Sheet 9	1	2	3	4	5	6	7	8	Final
(Ontario) Rachel Homan 🔨	2	0	0	2	0	1	0	X	5
(Saskatchewan) Sherry Anderson	0	0	1	0	1	0	1	X	3

Sheet 2	1	2	3	4	5	6	7	8	Final
(Alberta) Kayla Skrlik 🔨	1	1	0	0	4	0	X	X	6
(Alberta) Claire Booth	0	0	1	0	0	1	X	X	2

Sheet 4	1	2	3	4	5	6	7	8	Final
(Alberta) Selena Sturmay	0	0	0	0	1	X	X	X	1
(Alberta) Elysa Crough 🔨	1	1	1	3	0	X	X	X	6

Sheet 6	1	2	3	4	5	6	7	8	Final
(Alberta) Marla Sherrer	1	1	0	0	0	2	2	2	8
(Alberta) Serena Gray-Withers 🔨	0	0	1	3	1	0	0	0	5

Sheet 8	1	2	3	4	5	6	7	8	Final
(Alberta) Melissa Pierce	0	0	0	1	0	0	0	X	1
(Saskatchewan) Brett Barber 🔨	0	1	1	0	2	1	4	X	9

Sheet 10	1	2	3	4	5	6	7	8	Final
(Alberta) Kellie Stiksma	0	1	0	0	2	2	0	3	8
(Alberta) Ryleigh Bakker 🔨	1	0	2	1	0	0	1	0	5

== Tiebreakers ==
Sunday, September 12, 2:00 pm

Sheet 7	1	2	3	4	5	6	7	8	Final
(Manitoba) Mackenzie Zacharias	0	1	0	0	0	1	0	X	2
(Alberta) Laura Walker 🔨	2	0	1	0	2	0	2	X	7

Sheet 8	1	2	3	4	5	6	7	8	Final
(Germany) Daniela Jentsch	0	0	0	1	0	2	0	X	3
(Alberta) Casey Scheidegger 🔨	2	1	1	0	1	0	1	X	6

== Playoffs ==
Quarterfinals
1	(Ontario) Rachel Homan	6
8	(Alberta) Casey Scheidegger	7
4	(Manitoba) Kerri Einarson	7
5	(South Korea) Kim Eun-jung	8
3	(British Columbia) Corryn Brown	6
6	(Manitoba) Darcy Robertson	3
2	(Alberta) Kelsey Rocque	5
7	(Alberta) Laura Walker	6

Semifinals
8	(Alberta) Casey Scheidegger	4
5	(South Korea) Kim Eun-jung	5
3	(British Columbia) Corryn Brown	3
7	(Alberta) Laura Walker	6

Final
5	(South Korea) Kim Eun-jung	6
7	(Alberta) Laura Walker	2

=== Quarterfinals ===
Sunday, September 12, 7:00 pm

Sheet 3	1	2	3	4	5	6	7	8	Final
(Ontario) Rachel Homan 🔨	2	0	1	0	1	0	2	0	6
(Alberta) Casey Scheidegger	0	2	0	2	0	2	0	1	7

Sheet 5	1	2	3	4	5	6	7	8	Final
(Manitoba) Kerri Einarson	0	1	1	0	0	4	1	0	7
(South Korea) Kim Eun-jung 🔨	2	0	0	2	3	0	0	1	8

Sheet 6	1	2	3	4	5	6	7	8	Final
(British Columbia) Corryn Brown 🔨	2	0	1	1	2	0	0	X	6
(Manitoba) Darcy Robertson	0	2	0	0	0	0	1	X	3

Sheet 9	1	2	3	4	5	6	7	8	Final
(Alberta) Kelsey Rocque 🔨	1	0	0	1	0	2	1	0	5
(Alberta) Laura Walker	0	1	1	0	1	0	0	3	6

=== Semifinals ===
Monday, September 13, 12:30 pm

Sheet 3	1	2	3	4	5	6	7	8	Final
(Alberta) Casey Scheidegger	1	0	1	1	0	1	0	0	4
(South Korea) Kim Eun-jung 🔨	0	1	0	0	3	0	0	1	5

Sheet 5	1	2	3	4	5	6	7	8	Final
(British Columbia) Corryn Brown 🔨	1	0	0	1	0	1	0	X	3
(Alberta) Laura Walker	0	1	2	0	1	0	2	X	6

=== Final ===
Monday, September 13, 4:00 pm

Sheet 3	1	2	3	4	5	6	7	8	Final
(South Korea) Kim Eun-jung 🔨	2	0	1	2	0	1	0	X	6
(Alberta) Laura Walker	0	1	0	0	0	0	1	X	2
