= New Year Curling in Miyota =

World Curling Tour event

WCT New Year Curling in Miyota
- Established: 2022–23
- Host city: Miyota, Nagano, Japan
- Arena: Curling Hall Miyota
- Purse: ¥2,000,000
- 2025 champion: (Nagano Prefecture) Miyu Ueno

The WCT New Year Curling in Miyota (Japanese: WCT ニューイヤーカーリング in 御代田) is an annual tournament on the women's Japan World Curling Tour. It is held annually, with its final being played on New Year's Day. In 2023, the event was known as the WCT Japan New Year Medalist Curling in Miyota (Japanese: WCTジャパン ニューイヤーメダリストカーリング in 御代田).

The event is held at the Curling Hall Miyota in Miyota, Nagano, Japan. The semifinals and finals are televised in Japan on TV Asahi.

The purse for the event is ¥2,000,000, with the winning team receiving ¥1,000,000.

The event has been held since 2022–23. Teams play a round robin, with the top four teams making the playoffs.

The 2023 event featured six domestic teams, plus Team Daniela Jentsch from Germany and Team Isabelle Ladouceur from Canada.

The 2024 event featured eight domestic Japanese teams, plus Team Delaney Strouse from the United States and Team Ha Seung-youn from South Korea.

The 2025 event featured six domestic Japanese rinks and also included Team Kate Cameron from Canada and Team Rebecca Mariani from Italy.

== Champions ==
Year	Winning team	Runner up team	Purse	Winner's share
2023	(Germany) Daniela Jentsch, Emira Abbes, Lena Kapp, Analena Jentsch	(Nagano Prefecture) Asuka Kanai, Ami Enami, Yui Ueno, Junko Nishimuro	¥2,000,000	¥1,000,000
2024	(Aomori Prefecture) Misaki Tanaka (Fourth), Miori Nakamura (Skip), Haruka Kihara, Hiyori Ichinohe	(Hokkaido) Yuna Kotani, Kaho Onodera, Anna Ohmiya, Mina Kobayashi	¥2,000,000	¥1,000,000
2025	(Nagano Prefecture) Miyu Ueno, Yui Ueno, Junko Nishimuro, Asuka Kanai	(Hokkaido) Kotone Suzuki (Fourth), Moka Tanaka, Minami Nakao, Aira Inada	¥2,000,000	¥1,000,000
