= 2023 New Year Medalist Curling =

- Host city: Miyota, Japan
- Arena: Curling Hall Miyota
- Dates: December 30 – January 1
- Winner: (Germany) Team Jentsch
- Curling club: CC Füssen, Füssen
- Skip: Daniela Jentsch
- Third: Emira Abbes
- Second: Lena Kapp
- Lead: Analena Jentsch
- Finalist: (Japan) Asuka Kanai

The 2023 WCT Japan New Year Medalist Curling in Miyota (Japanese: WCTジャパン ニューイヤーメダリストカーリング in 御代田 2023) was held from December 30 to January 1 at the Curling Hall Miyota in Miyota, Japan. The total purse for the event was ¥ 2,000,000. It was the fifth event on the World Curling Tour Japan for the 2022–23 curling season.

The event was won by the German rink of Daniela Jentsch, Emira Abbes, Lena Kapp and Analena Jentsch from Füssen, who after losing their first game, won five straight games to claim the event title. In the final, they defeated Karuizawa's Asuka Kanai, who they had lost to the in opening draw. To reach the final, Team Jentsch won 6–5 over Canada's Isabelle Ladouceur in the quarterfinals and then beat Sapporo's Sayaka Yoshimura 7–4 in the semifinals. Team Kanai had a direct berth to the semifinals by finishing 3–0 in pool play and beat Sapporo's Mayu Minami 6–1 to advance to the final. Miyota's Wakaba Kawamura also qualified for the playoffs but was eliminated 7–4 by Team Minami in the quarterfinals. Miyota's Arisa Kotani and Yuri Nakajima rounded out the field of eight teams.

== Teams ==
The teams are listed as follows:

Skip	Third	Second	Lead	Alternate	Locale
Daniela Jentsch	Emira Abbes	Lena Kapp (Note: Lena Kapp spared for Mia Höhne.)	Analena Jentsch		Füssen, Germany
Asuka Kanai	Ami Enami	Yui Ueno (Note: Yui Ueno spared for Mone Ryokawa. She played second while second Junko Nishimuro moved down to lead.)	Junko Nishimuro		Karuizawa, Japan
Wakaba Kawamura	Haruka Asakawa	Azusa Yasuga	Chihiro Yuki		Miyota, Japan
Arisa Kotani	Eri Ogihara	Kotoka Segawa	Ai Kawada		Miyota, Japan
Isabelle Ladouceur	Jamie Smith	Grace Lloyd	Rachel Steele		Waterloo, Ontario, Canada
Mayu Minami	Kana Ogawa	Momo Kaneta	Nao Kyoto		Sapporo, Japan
Megumi Kanai (Fourth)	Maki Yamada	Akane Suzuki	Yuri Nakajima (Skip)		Miyota, Japan
Sayaka Yoshimura	Yuna Kotani	Kaho Onodera	Anna Ohmiya	Mina Kobayashi	Sapporo, Japan

== Round robin standings ==
Final Round Robin Standings

Key
Teams to Playoffs

Pool A	W	L	PF	PA	DSC
(Japan) Sayaka Yoshimura	3	0	22	8	34.34
(Japan) Mayu Minami	2	1	19	14	67.10
(Canada) Isabelle Ladouceur	1	2	15	19	63.36
(Japan) Arisa Kotani	0	3	10	25	89.40

Pool B	W	L	PF	PA	DSC
(Japan) Asuka Kanai	3	0	22	8	48.16
(Germany) Daniela Jentsch	2	1	18	15	134.06
(Japan) Wakaba Kawamura	1	2	12	19	105.76
(Japan) Yuri Nakajima	0	3	14	24	134.22

== Round robin results ==
All draw times are listed in Japan Standard Time (UTC+09:00).

=== Draw 1 ===
Friday, December 30, 9:00 am

Sheet A	1	2	3	4	5	6	7	8	Final
(Japan) Sayaka Yoshimura	2	0	0	2	2	1	1	X	8
(Japan) Mayu Minami	0	0	1	0	0	0	0	X	1

Sheet B	1	2	3	4	5	6	7	8	Final
(Germany) Daniela Jentsch	0	0	0	0	1	0	0	X	1
(Japan) Asuka Kanai	1	0	0	1	0	2	3	X	7

=== Draw 2 ===
Friday, December 30, 2:30 pm

Sheet A	1	2	3	4	5	6	7	8	Final
(Canada) Isabelle Ladouceur	0	2	3	1	0	0	2	X	8
(Japan) Arisa Kotani	1	0	0	0	2	1	0	X	4

Sheet B	1	2	3	4	5	6	7	8	Final
(Japan) Wakaba Kawamura	0	1	0	1	2	1	3	X	8
(Japan) Yuri Nakajima	1	0	2	0	0	0	0	X	3

=== Draw 3 ===
Friday, December 30, 6:00 pm

Sheet A	1	2	3	4	5	6	7	8	Final
(Japan) Yuri Nakajima	1	0	1	0	0	2	1	X	5
(Germany) Daniela Jentsch	0	4	0	1	3	0	0	X	8

Sheet B	1	2	3	4	5	6	7	8	Final
(Japan) Arisa Kotani	0	3	0	0	0	0	0	X	3
(Japan) Sayaka Yoshimura	1	0	0	2	1	2	1	X	7

=== Draw 4 ===
Friday, December 30, 9:30 pm

Sheet A	1	2	3	4	5	6	7	8	Final
(Japan) Wakaba Kawamura	0	0	1	0	0	0	X	X	1
(Japan) Asuka Kanai	1	1	0	1	2	2	X	X	7

Sheet B	1	2	3	4	5	6	7	8	Final
(Canada) Isabelle Ladouceur	0	1	2	0	0	0	X	X	3
(Japan) Mayu Minami	2	0	0	3	2	1	X	X	8

=== Draw 5 ===
Saturday, December 31, 9:00 am

Sheet A	1	2	3	4	5	6	7	8	Final
(Japan) Asuka Kanai	4	0	0	3	0	1	0	X	8
(Japan) Yuri Nakajima	0	2	1	0	1	0	2	X	6

Sheet B	1	2	3	4	5	6	7	8	Final
(Canada) Isabelle Ladouceur	0	0	1	0	3	0	0	X	4
(Japan) Sayaka Yoshimura	0	2	0	2	0	2	1	X	7

=== Draw 6 ===
Saturday, December 31, 2:30 pm

Sheet A	1	2	3	4	5	6	7	8	Final
(Japan) Arisa Kotani	0	0	2	0	0	1	0	X	3
(Japan) Mayu Minami	1	2	0	2	2	0	3	X	10

Sheet B	1	2	3	4	5	6	7	8	Final
(Japan) Wakaba Kawamura	0	0	0	2	0	1	X	X	3
(Germany) Daniela Jentsch	3	3	1	0	2	0	X	X	9

== Playoffs ==
Quarterfinals
B2	(Germany) Daniela Jentsch	6
A3	(Canada) Isabelle Ladouceur	5
A2	(Japan) Mayu Minami	7
B3	(Japan) Wakaba Kawamura	4

Semifinals
A1	(Japan) Sayaka Yoshimura	4
B2	(Germany) Daniela Jentsch	7
B1	(Japan) Asuka Kanai	6
A2	(Japan) Mayu Minami	1

Final
B2	(Germany) Daniela Jentsch	7
B1	(Japan) Asuka Kanai	4

=== Quarterfinals ===
Saturday, December 31, 6:00 pm

Sheet A	1	2	3	4	5	6	7	8	Final
(Germany) Daniela Jentsch	1	0	2	0	2	0	0	1	6
(Canada) Isabelle Ladouceur	0	2	0	2	0	1	0	0	5

Sheet B	1	2	3	4	5	6	7	8	Final
(Japan) Mayu Minami	1	0	0	3	2	0	1	X	7
(Japan) Wakaba Kawamura	0	1	2	0	0	1	0	X	4

=== Semifinals ===
Sunday, January 1, 8:00 am

Sheet A	1	2	3	4	5	6	7	8	Final
(Japan) Asuka Kanai	0	2	1	0	1	0	2	X	6
(Japan) Mayu Minami	0	0	0	0	0	1	0	X	1

Sheet B	1	2	3	4	5	6	7	8	Final
(Japan) Sayaka Yoshimura	0	1	0	0	0	3	0	X	4
(Germany) Daniela Jentsch	1	0	0	3	2	0	1	X	7

=== Final ===
Sunday, January 1, 1:00 pm

Sheet B	1	2	3	4	5	6	7	8	Final
(Germany) Daniela Jentsch	0	0	3	0	2	0	2	X	7
(Japan) Asuka Kanai	1	0	0	1	0	2	0	X	4
