= Changan Ford International Curling Elite =

World Curling Tour event

- Established: 2016
- Host city: Xining, Qinghai, China
- Purse: CNY 225,000 (2019)

Current champions (2019)
- Men: (United States) Rich Ruohonen
- Women: (Russia) Alina Kovaleva

Current edition
- 2019 Changan Ford International Curling Elite

The Changan Ford International Curling Elite (known formally as the Qinghai Curling Elite, Qinghai International and originally as the Qinghai China International) is an annual bonspiel, or curling tournament, held in Xining, Qinghai, China. It has been a part of both the Men's and Women's World Curling Tour since 2016. The tournament is held in a round robin format. Over the three years that the tournament has been held, there has been teams from 15 different countries that have participated: Canada, China, Czech Republic, Estonia, Finland, Germany, Italy, South Korea, Netherlands, Norway, Russia, Scotland, Sweden, Switzerland and United States.

== Past Champions ==
=== Men ===
Year	Winner	Runner up	Purse
2016	(Norway) Thomas Ulsrud, Torger Nergård, Christoffer Svae, Håvard Vad Petersson	(Canada) William Lyburn, Jared Kolomaya, Richard Daneault, Braden Zawada	$23,996 (CDN)
2017	(Switzerland) Yannick Schwaller, Romano Meier, Michael Brunner, Marcel Käufeler	(China) Liu Rui, Xu Xiaoming, Jiang Dongxu, Zang Jialiang	$18,000 (USD)
2018	(Canada) Matt Dunstone, Braeden Moskowy, Catlin Schneider, Dustin Kidby	(Czech Republic) Lukáš Klíma, Jiri Candra, Marek Černovský, Samuel Mokriš	$30,000 (USD)
2019	(United States) Greg Persinger (Fourth), Rich Ruohonen (Skip), Colin Hufman, Phil Tilker	(Netherlands) Wouter Gösgens (Fourth), Jaap van Dorp (Skip), Laurens Hoekman, Carlo Glasbergen	¥ 225,000

=== Women ===
Year	Winner	Runner up	Purse
2016	(Canada) Corryn Brown, Marika Van Osch, Dezaray Hawes, Samantha Fisher	(Scotland) Hannah Fleming, Jennifer Dodds, Alice Spence, Vicky Wright	$23,996 (CDN)
2017	(Switzerland) Ursi Hegner, Imogen Oona Lehmann, Nina Ledergerber, Claudia Baumann	(Russia) Victoria Moiseeva, Uliana Vasilyeva, Galina Arsenkina, Julia Guzieva	$18,000 (USD)
2018	(Germany) Daniela Jentsch, Emira Abbes, Analena Jentsch, Klara-Hermine Fomm	(Russia) Alina Kovaleva, Anastasia Bryzgalova, Uliana Vasilyeva, Ekaterina Kuzmina	$30,000 (USD)
2019	(Russia) Alina Kovaleva, Maria Komarova, Galina Arsenkina, Ekaterina Kuzmina	(South Korea) Kim Eun-jung, Kim Kyeong-ae, Kim Seon-yeong, Kim Yeong-mi	¥ 225,000
