= 2023 World Women's Curling Championship =

2023 edition of the World Women's Curling Championship

- Host city: Sandviken, Sweden
- Arena: Göransson Arena
- Dates: March 18–26
- Winner: Switzerland
- Curling club: CC Aarau, Aarau
- Skip: Silvana Tirinzoni
- Fourth: Alina Pätz
- Second: Carole Howald
- Lead: Briar Schwaller-Hürlimann
- Coach: Pierre Charette
- Finalist: Norway (Rørvik)

The 2023 World Women's Curling Championship (branded as 2023 LGT World Women's Curling Championship for sponsorship reasons) was held from March 18 to 26 at the Göransson Arena in Sandviken, Sweden.

The format for the Championship featured a thirteen team round robin. The top six teams qualified for the playoff round where the top two teams received a bye while the remaining four played the first round.

== Qualification ==
Thirteen curling federations qualified to participate in the 2023 World Women's Curling Championship. This was the first year to qualify teams using the new 2022 Pan Continental Curling Championships, with New Zealand winning entry into the World Women's Championship for the first time, represented by a team skipped by Jessica Smith.

Means of Qualification	Vacancies	Qualified
Host Nation	1	Sweden
2022 Pan Continental Curling Championships	5	Japan; South Korea; Canada; United States; New Zealand
2022 European Curling Championships	7	Denmark; Switzerland; Scotland; Italy; Turkey; Germany; Norway
TOTAL	13	

== Teams ==
The teams were as follows:

Canada	Denmark	Germany	Italy	Japan
Gimli CC, Gimli Skip: Kerri Einarson; Third: Val Sweeting; Second: Shannon Birchard; Lead: Briane Harris; Alternate: Krysten Karwacki	Hvidovre CC, Hvidovre & Gentofte CC, Gentofte Skip: Madeleine Dupont; Third: Mathilde Halse; Second: Denise Dupont; Lead: My Larsen; Alternate: Jasmin Lander	CC Füssen, Füssen Skip: Daniela Jentsch; Third: Emira Abbes; Second: Lena Kapp; Lead: Analena Jentsch; Alternate: Pia-Lisa Schöll	Curling Pinerolo ASD, Pinerolo, ASD Milano CC, Milan, CC Dolomiti, Cortina d'Ampezzo & CC Lago Santo, Trento Skip: Stefania Constantini; Third: Marta Lo Deserto; Second: Angela Romei; Lead: Giulia Zardini Lacedelli; Alternate: Camilla Gilberti	Tokoro CC, Kitami Skip: Satsuki Fujisawa; Third: Chinami Yoshida; Second: Yumi Suzuki; Lead: Yurika Yoshida; Alternate: Kotomi Ishizaki
New Zealand	Norway	Scotland	South Korea	Sweden
Naseby Indoor Curling Rink, Naseby Skip: Jessica Smith; Third: Holly Thompson; Second: Bridget Becker; Lead: Natalie Thurlow; Alternate: Ruby Kinney	Lillehammer CC, Lillehammer Fourth: Kristin Skaslien; Skip: Marianne Rørvik; Second: Mille Haslev Nordbye; Lead: Martine Rønning; Alternate: Maia Ramsfjell	Curl Aberdeen, Aberdeen Skip: Rebecca Morrison; Third: Gina Aitken; Second: Sophie Sinclair; Lead: Sophie Jackson; Alternate: Jennifer Dodds	Chuncheon CC, Chuncheon Skip: Ha Seung-youn; Third: Kim Hye-rin; Second: Yang Tae-i; Lead: Kim Su-jin	Sundbybergs CK, Sundbyberg Skip: Anna Hasselborg; Third: Sara McManus; Second: Agnes Knochenhauer; Lead: Sofia Mabergs; Alternate: Johanna Heldin
Switzerland	Turkey	United States		
CC Aarau, Aarau Fourth: Alina Pätz; Skip: Silvana Tirinzoni; Second: Carole Howald; Lead: Briar Schwaller-Hürlimann	Milli Piyango CA, Erzurum Skip: Dilşat Yıldız; Third: Öznur Polat; Second: Mihriban Polat; Lead: Berfin Şengül; Alternate: İfayet Şafak Çalıkuşu	St. Paul CC, St. Paul, Madison CC, McFarland & Duluth CC, Duluth Skip: Tabitha Peterson; Third: Cory Thiesse; Second: Becca Hamilton; Lead: Tara Peterson; Alternate: Vicky Persinger		

=== WCF ranking ===
Year to date World Curling Federation order of merit ranking for each team prior to the event.

Nation (Skip)	Rank	Points
Canada (Einarson)	1	381.0
Switzerland (Tirinzoni)	2	334.8
Japan (Fujisawa)	6	272.5
Sweden (Hasselborg)	9	209.3
United States (Peterson)	13	174.3
South Korea (Ha)	19	144.8
Italy (Constantini)	20	142.0
Scotland (Morrison)	21	133.9
Germany (Jentsch)	24	123.2
Norway (Rørvik)	25	117.3
Denmark (Dupont)	33	98.5
Turkey (Yıldız)	87	30.9
New Zealand (Smith)	149	9.0

== Round robin standings ==
Final Round Robin Standings

Key
Teams to Playoffs

Country	Skip	W	L	W–L	PF	PA	EW	EL	BE	SE	S%	DSC
Switzerland	Silvana Tirinzoni	12	0	–	92	36	51	29	12	21	85.3%	33.01
Norway	Marianne Rørvik	8	4	–	71	66	45	42	13	13	82.7%	27.94
Canada	Kerri Einarson	7	5	2–1; 1–0	88	74	53	46	5	16	81.5%	23.69
Italy	Stefania Constantini	7	5	2–1; 0–1	75	63	51	47	9	14	81.4%	30.70
Sweden	Anna Hasselborg	7	5	1–2; 1–0	74	71	45	43	6	8	81.3%	16.00
Japan	Satsuki Fujisawa	7	5	1–2; 0–1	73	66	48	43	13	17	79.8%	29.94
United States	Tabitha Peterson	6	6	1–0	80	74	48	51	2	13	83.3%	28.21
Turkey	Dilşat Yıldız	6	6	0–1	68	85	46	44	10	13	76.5%	30.14
South Korea	Ha Seung-youn	5	7	2–0	66	71	47	47	11	12	79.5%	29.42
Germany	Daniela Jentsch	5	7	1–1	58	70	36	51	11	8	77.5%	43.04
Denmark	Madeleine Dupont	5	7	0–2	68	73	44	52	5	10	78.1%	51.08
Scotland	Rebecca Morrison	3	9	–	86	90	55	55	1	15	78.1%	63.70
New Zealand	Jessica Smith	0	12	–	46	106	35	54	2	13	65.7%	63.75

Round Robin Summary Table
Pos.	Country	Canada	Denmark	Germany	Italy	Japan	New Zealand	Norway	Scotland	South Korea	Sweden	Switzerland	Turkey	United States	Record
3	Canada	—	5–11	3–8	7–2	5–6	10–4	9–6	9–8	8–6	9–4	6–7	10–4	7–8	7–5
11	Denmark	11–5	—	6–7	5–7	7–6	8–5	3–7	9–7	3–6	9–4	3–7	2–5	2–7	5–7
10	Germany	8–3	7–6	—	7–4	1–7	8–2	3–6	5–12	2–4	9–3	1–9	3–8	4–6	5–7
4	Italy	2–7	7–5	4–7	—	7–3	6–5	5–6	7–6	8–3	7–3	3–9	12–1	7–9	7–5
6	Japan	6–5	6–7	7–1	3–7	—	7–5	10–3	9–8	7–4	4–5	2–11	4–7	8–3	7–5
13	New Zealand	4–10	5–8	2–8	5–6	5–7	—	1–8	3–8	7–8	2–14	1–9	10–13	1–7	0–12
2	Norway	6–9	7–3	6–3	6–5	3–10	8–1	—	9–6	8–6	3–6	1–6	7–6	7–5	8–4
12	Scotland	8–9	7–9	12–5	6–7	8–9	8–3	6–9	—	4–6	6–9	6–7	7–10	8–7	3–9
9	South Korea	6–8	6–3	4–2	3–8	4–7	8–7	6–8	6–4	—	5–7	3–5	5–6	10–6	5–7
5	Sweden	4–9	4–9	3–9	3–7	5–4	14–2	6–3	9–6	7–5	—	3–9	7–2	9–6	7–5
1	Switzerland	7–6	7–3	9–1	9–3	11–2	9–1	6–1	7–6	5–3	9–3	—	7–2	7–5	12–0
8	Turkey	4–10	5–2	8–3	1–12	7–4	13–10	6–7	10–7	6–5	2–7	2–7	—	4–11	6–6
7	United States	8–7	7–2	6–4	9–7	3–8	7–1	5–7	7–8	6–10	6–9	5–7	11–4	—	6–6

== Round robin results ==
All draw times are listed in Central European Time (UTC+01:00).

=== Draw 1 ===
Saturday, March 18, 2:00 pm

Sheet A	1	2	3	4	5	6	7	8	9	10	Final
Switzerland (Tirinzoni)	1	1	0	1	1	1	0	0	1	1	7
United States (Peterson) 🔨	0	0	2	0	0	0	3	0	0	0	5

Sheet B	1	2	3	4	5	6	7	8	9	10	Final
South Korea (Ha) 🔨	0	0	0	3	0	1	0	0	2	0	6
Norway (Rørvik)	0	0	1	0	2	0	1	1	0	3	8

Sheet C	1	2	3	4	5	6	7	8	9	10	Final
New Zealand (Smith)	0	1	0	0	1	0	X	X	X	X	2
Sweden (Hasselborg) 🔨	3	0	3	6	0	2	X	X	X	X	14

Sheet D	1	2	3	4	5	6	7	8	9	10	Final
Denmark (Dupont)	0	0	0	2	0	0	2	2	0	1	7
Japan (Fujisawa) 🔨	1	1	2	0	1	1	0	0	0	0	6

=== Draw 2 ===
Saturday, March 18, 7:00 pm

Sheet A	1	2	3	4	5	6	7	8	9	10	Final
Germany (Jentsch) 🔨	0	0	0	3	0	0	2	0	0	X	5
Scotland (Morrison)	2	1	2	0	1	1	0	1	4	X	12

Sheet B	1	2	3	4	5	6	7	8	9	10	Final
Italy (Constantini)	4	1	1	0	3	3	X	X	X	X	12
Turkey (Yıldız) 🔨	0	0	0	1	0	0	X	X	X	X	1

Sheet C	1	2	3	4	5	6	7	8	9	10	Final
Switzerland (Tirinzoni)	0	6	0	2	2	1	X	X	X	X	11
Japan (Fujisawa) 🔨	1	0	1	0	0	0	X	X	X	X	2

Sheet D	1	2	3	4	5	6	7	8	9	10	Final
Canada (Einarson) 🔨	1	0	0	0	1	0	0	1	2	4	9
Sweden (Hasselborg)	0	1	1	0	0	0	2	0	0	0	4

=== Draw 3 ===
Sunday, March 19, 9:00 am

Sheet A	1	2	3	4	5	6	7	8	9	10	Final
Turkey (Yıldız) 🔨	0	0	0	2	0	2	0	4	0	5	13
New Zealand (Smith)	0	1	0	0	2	0	3	0	4	0	10

Sheet B	1	2	3	4	5	6	7	8	9	10	Final
United States (Peterson) 🔨	1	1	1	0	0	1	0	3	0	1	8
Canada (Einarson)	0	0	0	2	1	0	3	0	1	0	7

Sheet C	1	2	3	4	5	6	7	8	9	10	Final
Scotland (Morrison) 🔨	0	0	2	0	3	0	1	1	0	0	7
Denmark (Dupont)	1	3	0	2	0	1	0	0	1	1	9

Sheet D	1	2	3	4	5	6	7	8	9	10	Final
Italy (Constantini) 🔨	2	0	0	2	1	0	2	1	X	X	8
South Korea (Ha)	0	1	1	0	0	1	0	0	X	X	3

=== Draw 4 ===
Sunday, March 19, 2:00 pm

Sheet A	1	2	3	4	5	6	7	8	9	10	Final
Denmark (Dupont)	0	0	0	0	2	0	0	1	0	0	3
South Korea (Ha) 🔨	0	1	1	0	0	2	0	0	1	1	6

Sheet B	1	2	3	4	5	6	7	8	9	10	Final
Sweden (Hasselborg)	0	1	0	1	0	1	X	X	X	X	3
Switzerland (Tirinzoni) 🔨	2	0	4	0	3	0	X	X	X	X	9

Sheet C	1	2	3	4	5	6	7	8	9	10	Final
Norway (Rørvik) 🔨	0	0	0	2	0	0	3	0	1	1	7
United States (Peterson)	0	0	0	0	1	1	0	3	0	0	5

Sheet D	1	2	3	4	5	6	7	8	9	10	Final
New Zealand (Smith)	0	1	0	0	0	1	0	X	X	X	2
Germany (Jentsch) 🔨	3	0	2	1	1	0	1	X	X	X	8

=== Draw 5 ===
Sunday, March 19, 7:00 pm

Sheet A	1	2	3	4	5	6	7	8	9	10	Final
Canada (Einarson) 🔨	2	0	2	1	0	0	0	0	1	3	9
Norway (Rørvik)	0	2	0	0	2	1	0	1	0	0	6

Sheet B	1	2	3	4	5	6	7	8	9	10	Final
Japan (Fujisawa) 🔨	1	0	0	1	0	0	2	1	0	4	9
Scotland (Morrison)	0	2	2	0	2	1	0	0	1	0	8

Sheet C	1	2	3	4	5	6	7	8	9	10	Final
Germany (Jentsch)	0	1	0	0	2	1	2	0	1	0	7
Italy (Constantini) 🔨	1	0	1	0	0	0	0	1	0	1	4

Sheet D	1	2	3	4	5	6	7	8	9	10	Final
Turkey (Yıldız)	0	0	0	0	0	1	0	1	0	X	2
Switzerland (Tirinzoni) 🔨	0	2	0	0	2	0	2	0	1	X	7

=== Draw 6 ===
Monday, March 20, 9:00 am

Sheet A	1	2	3	4	5	6	7	8	9	10	Final
United States (Peterson)	0	0	0	1	0	1	0	1	X	X	3
Japan (Fujisawa) 🔨	2	2	1	0	1	0	2	0	X	X	8

Sheet B	1	2	3	4	5	6	7	8	9	10	Final
Canada (Einarson)	0	0	1	1	0	2	0	1	2	X	7
Italy (Constantini) 🔨	1	0	0	0	1	0	0	0	0	X	2

Sheet C	1	2	3	4	5	6	7	8	9	10	11	Final
South Korea (Ha) 🔨	0	0	0	0	4	1	0	0	1	1	1	8
New Zealand (Smith)	2	1	1	1	0	0	1	1	0	0	0	7

=== Draw 7 ===
Monday, March 20, 2:00 pm

Sheet A	1	2	3	4	5	6	7	8	9	10	Final
South Korea (Ha) 🔨	1	0	0	0	1	0	2	1	1	0	6
Scotland (Morrison)	0	0	1	1	0	1	0	0	0	1	4

Sheet B	1	2	3	4	5	6	7	8	9	10	Final
Switzerland (Tirinzoni) 🔨	2	2	1	2	2	0	0	X	X	X	9
Germany (Jentsch)	0	0	0	0	0	0	1	X	X	X	1

Sheet C	1	2	3	4	5	6	7	8	9	10	Final
Sweden (Hasselborg) 🔨	2	0	1	0	0	0	3	1	X	X	7
Turkey (Yıldız)	0	0	0	1	1	0	0	0	X	X	2

Sheet D	1	2	3	4	5	6	7	8	9	10	Final
Norway (Rørvik)	2	2	0	0	1	0	1	0	1	X	7
Denmark (Dupont) 🔨	0	0	1	0	0	1	0	1	0	X	3

=== Draw 8 ===
Monday, March 20, 7:00 pm

Sheet A	1	2	3	4	5	6	7	8	9	10	11	Final
Italy (Constantini) 🔨	0	2	0	0	0	1	2	0	0	0	1	6
New Zealand (Smith)	0	0	0	1	1	0	0	1	1	1	0	5

Sheet B	1	2	3	4	5	6	7	8	9	10	Final
Turkey (Yıldız)	0	1	0	0	2	1	0	0	0	X	4
United States (Peterson) 🔨	2	0	3	1	0	0	0	2	3	X	11

Sheet C	1	2	3	4	5	6	7	8	9	10	Final
Japan (Fujisawa) 🔨	0	0	1	0	1	1	3	1	3	X	10
Norway (Rørvik)	0	0	0	3	0	0	0	0	0	X	3

Sheet D	1	2	3	4	5	6	7	8	9	10	Final
Scotland (Morrison)	0	4	0	0	1	0	0	0	2	1	8
Canada (Einarson) 🔨	4	0	1	1	0	1	1	1	0	0	9

=== Draw 9 ===
Tuesday, March 21, 9:00 am

Sheet B	1	2	3	4	5	6	7	8	9	10	Final
Denmark (Dupont)	0	0	2	0	0	1	0	1	0	1	5
Italy (Constantini) 🔨	0	1	0	0	2	0	2	0	2	0	7

Sheet C	1	2	3	4	5	6	7	8	9	10	Final
New Zealand (Smith)	0	0	0	1	0	0	X	X	X	X	1
United States (Peterson) 🔨	1	1	1	0	3	1	X	X	X	X	7

Sheet D	1	2	3	4	5	6	7	8	9	10	Final
Germany (Jentsch) 🔨	0	0	0	1	0	2	1	0	5	X	9
Sweden (Hasselborg)	0	1	0	0	1	0	0	1	0	X	3

=== Draw 10 ===
Tuesday, March 21, 2:00 pm

Sheet A	1	2	3	4	5	6	7	8	9	10	Final
Scotland (Morrison)	0	0	1	0	2	0	1	0	2	X	6
Norway (Rørvik) 🔨	2	1	0	2	0	1	0	3	0	X	9

Sheet B	1	2	3	4	5	6	7	8	9	10	Final
Germany (Jentsch) 🔨	1	0	0	0	0	0	1	0	0	0	2
South Korea (Ha)	0	2	0	0	1	0	0	0	0	1	4

Sheet C	1	2	3	4	5	6	7	8	9	10	Final
Canada (Einarson) 🔨	2	0	2	0	0	0	0	1	1	0	6
Switzerland (Tirinzoni)	0	2	0	0	3	1	0	0	0	1	7

Sheet D	1	2	3	4	5	6	7	8	9	10	Final
Japan (Fujisawa)	0	0	0	2	0	2	0	0	0	X	4
Turkey (Yıldız) 🔨	0	1	1	0	2	0	0	1	2	X	7

=== Draw 11 ===
Tuesday, March 21, 7:00 pm

Sheet A	1	2	3	4	5	6	7	8	9	10	Final
Sweden (Hasselborg) 🔨	1	0	0	0	2	1	0	0	0	1	5
Japan (Fujisawa)	0	0	0	1	0	0	1	1	1	0	4

Sheet B	1	2	3	4	5	6	7	8	9	10	Final
New Zealand (Smith)	0	2	0	1	0	1	0	0	X	X	4
Canada (Einarson) 🔨	2	0	3	0	1	0	2	2	X	X	10

Sheet C	1	2	3	4	5	6	7	8	9	10	Final
Italy (Constantini) 🔨	0	3	0	1	0	0	2	0	1	0	7
Scotland (Morrison)	0	0	1	0	2	1	0	1	0	1	6

Sheet D	1	2	3	4	5	6	7	8	9	10	Final
United States (Peterson) 🔨	2	1	0	1	0	3	X	X	X	X	7
Denmark (Dupont)	0	0	1	0	1	0	X	X	X	X	2

=== Draw 12 ===
Wednesday, March 22, 9:00 am

Sheet A	1	2	3	4	5	6	7	8	9	10	Final
Turkey (Yıldız)	0	0	0	1	0	2	2	0	0	1	6
South Korea (Ha) 🔨	0	0	1	0	2	0	0	1	1	0	5

Sheet B	1	2	3	4	5	6	7	8	9	10	Final
Norway (Rørvik)	0	0	0	0	1	0	0	1	1	0	3
Sweden (Hasselborg) 🔨	0	0	2	0	0	3	0	0	0	1	6

Sheet C	1	2	3	4	5	6	7	8	9	10	Final
Denmark (Dupont) 🔨	0	1	0	1	1	0	1	2	0	0	6
Germany (Jentsch)	0	0	3	0	0	2	0	0	1	1	7

Sheet D	1	2	3	4	5	6	7	8	9	10	Final
Switzerland (Tirinzoni) 🔨	0	2	1	1	1	4	X	X	X	X	9
New Zealand (Smith)	1	0	0	0	0	0	X	X	X	X	1

=== Draw 13 ===
Wednesday, March 22, 2:00 pm

Sheet A	1	2	3	4	5	6	7	8	9	10	Final
Canada (Einarson) 🔨	1	0	0	0	1	0	1	0	X	X	3
Germany (Jentsch)	0	0	1	1	0	2	0	4	X	X	8

Sheet B	1	2	3	4	5	6	7	8	9	10	Final
Scotland (Morrison) 🔨	0	2	0	2	0	1	0	2	0	1	8
United States (Peterson)	3	0	2	0	1	0	1	0	0	0	7

Sheet C	1	2	3	4	5	6	7	8	9	10	Final
Turkey (Yıldız)	0	1	0	2	0	1	0	1	0	1	6
Norway (Rørvik) 🔨	0	0	2	0	2	0	2	0	1	0	7

Sheet D	1	2	3	4	5	6	7	8	9	10	Final
Japan (Fujisawa) 🔨	0	1	0	1	0	1	0	0	0	0	3
Italy (Constantini)	0	0	1	0	2	0	1	1	1	1	7

=== Draw 14 ===
Wednesday, March 22, 7:00 pm

Sheet A	1	2	3	4	5	6	7	8	9	10	Final
New Zealand (Smith)	0	1	0	0	2	1	0	0	1	X	5
Denmark (Dupont) 🔨	1	0	3	2	0	0	0	2	0	X	8

Sheet B	1	2	3	4	5	6	7	8	9	10	Final
Italy (Constantini) 🔨	0	0	0	1	0	1	0	1	0	X	3
Switzerland (Tirinzoni)	0	1	0	0	2	0	3	0	3	X	9

Sheet C	1	2	3	4	5	6	7	8	9	10	Final
United States (Peterson)	0	0	3	0	1	0	2	0	0	X	6
Sweden (Hasselborg) 🔨	1	1	0	3	0	1	0	1	2	X	9

Sheet D	1	2	3	4	5	6	7	8	9	10	Final
South Korea (Ha) 🔨	1	1	0	0	1	0	2	0	1	0	6
Canada (Einarson)	0	0	2	0	0	2	0	1	0	3	8

=== Draw 15 ===
Thursday, March 23, 9:00 am

Sheet A	1	2	3	4	5	6	7	8	9	10	Final
Norway (Rørvik) 🔨	0	0	0	1	0	0	0	0	0	X	1
Switzerland (Tirinzoni)	0	0	1	0	0	0	0	0	5	X	6

Sheet B	1	2	3	4	5	6	7	8	9	10	Final
Germany (Jentsch)	0	0	0	0	0	0	3	0	X	X	3
Turkey (Yıldız) 🔨	1	0	1	1	2	1	0	2	X	X	8

Sheet C	1	2	3	4	5	6	7	8	9	10	Final
Japan (Fujisawa) 🔨	0	0	1	0	3	0	2	0	1	X	7
South Korea (Ha)	0	0	0	1	0	1	0	2	0	X	4

Sheet D	1	2	3	4	5	6	7	8	9	10	Final
Sweden (Hasselborg) 🔨	2	0	2	0	1	0	2	0	2	X	9
Scotland (Morrison)	0	2	0	2	0	1	0	1	0	X	6

=== Draw 16 ===
Thursday, March 23, 2:00 pm

Sheet A	1	2	3	4	5	6	7	8	9	10	Final
United States (Peterson) 🔨	3	1	0	2	0	1	0	0	0	2	9
Italy (Constantini)	0	0	2	0	1	0	1	1	2	0	7

Sheet B	1	2	3	4	5	6	7	8	9	10	Final
Canada (Einarson)	0	2	0	0	1	0	0	0	2	0	5
Japan (Fujisawa) 🔨	1	0	0	0	0	2	0	2	0	1	6

Sheet C	1	2	3	4	5	6	7	8	9	10	Final
Scotland (Morrison)	1	2	0	2	0	2	0	1	X	X	8
New Zealand (Smith) 🔨	0	0	0	0	2	0	1	0	X	X	3

Sheet D	1	2	3	4	5	6	7	8	9	10	Final
Denmark (Dupont)	0	0	0	1	0	0	0	1	0	0	2
Turkey (Yıldız) 🔨	0	0	1	0	0	1	1	0	1	1	5

=== Draw 17 ===
Thursday, March 23, 7:00 pm

Sheet A	1	2	3	4	5	6	7	8	9	10	Final
South Korea (Ha)	0	0	2	0	0	0	1	0	2	0	5
Sweden (Hasselborg) 🔨	1	0	0	0	0	2	0	3	0	1	7

Sheet B	1	2	3	4	5	6	7	8	9	10	Final
Norway (Rørvik) 🔨	0	1	2	1	2	2	X	X	X	X	8
New Zealand (Smith)	1	0	0	0	0	0	X	X	X	X	1

Sheet C	1	2	3	4	5	6	7	8	9	10	Final
Switzerland (Tirinzoni) 🔨	0	1	2	0	2	0	0	1	1	X	7
Denmark (Dupont)	1	0	0	1	0	1	0	0	0	X	3

Sheet D	1	2	3	4	5	6	7	8	9	10	Final
Germany (Jentsch) 🔨	1	0	0	0	1	0	1	1	0	X	4
United States (Peterson)	0	2	1	0	0	2	0	0	1	X	6

=== Draw 18 ===
Friday, March 24, 9:00 am

Sheet A	1	2	3	4	5	6	7	8	9	10	Final
Japan (Fujisawa) 🔨	2	1	1	0	0	1	2	X	X	X	7
Germany (Jentsch)	0	0	0	1	0	0	0	X	X	X	1

Sheet B	1	2	3	4	5	6	7	8	9	10	Final
Switzerland (Tirinzoni) 🔨	0	1	0	3	0	1	0	1	0	1	7
Scotland (Morrison)	0	0	1	0	1	0	2	0	1	0	6

Sheet C	1	2	3	4	5	6	7	8	9	10	Final
Turkey (Yıldız)	0	0	1	0	2	0	1	0	X	X	4
Canada (Einarson) 🔨	1	3	0	1	0	1	0	4	X	X	10

Sheet D	1	2	3	4	5	6	7	8	9	10	11	Final
Italy (Constantini)	0	0	0	1	0	0	1	1	0	2	0	5
Norway (Rørvik) 🔨	0	2	0	0	0	1	0	0	2	0	1	6

=== Draw 19 ===
Friday, March 24, 2:00 pm

Sheet A	1	2	3	4	5	6	7	8	9	10	Final
Denmark (Dupont) 🔨	1	0	3	0	3	0	0	4	X	X	11
Canada (Einarson)	0	2	0	1	0	1	1	0	X	X	5

Sheet B	1	2	3	4	5	6	7	8	9	10	Final
United States (Peterson)	0	0	2	1	0	1	0	2	0	0	6
South Korea (Ha) 🔨	0	1	0	0	3	0	2	0	2	2	10

Sheet C	1	2	3	4	5	6	7	8	9	10	Final
Sweden (Hasselborg)	0	1	0	0	1	0	1	0	0	X	3
Italy (Constantini) 🔨	1	0	0	3	0	1	0	1	1	X	7

Sheet D	1	2	3	4	5	6	7	8	9	10	Final
New Zealand (Smith) 🔨	0	2	0	1	0	0	1	0	1	X	5
Japan (Fujisawa)	1	0	2	0	0	4	0	0	0	X	7

=== Draw 20 ===
Friday, March 24, 7:00 pm

Sheet A	1	2	3	4	5	6	7	8	9	10	Final
Scotland (Morrison)	0	1	0	1	0	3	0	0	2	0	7
Turkey (Yıldız) 🔨	2	0	1	0	3	0	1	1	0	2	10

Sheet B	1	2	3	4	5	6	7	8	9	10	Final
Sweden (Hasselborg)	0	2	0	1	0	0	0	1	0	X	4
Denmark (Dupont) 🔨	2	0	1	0	0	2	1	0	3	X	9

Sheet C	1	2	3	4	5	6	7	8	9	10	Final
Norway (Rørvik) 🔨	0	0	2	0	0	1	0	2	0	1	6
Germany (Jentsch)	0	0	0	0	1	0	1	0	1	0	3

Sheet D	1	2	3	4	5	6	7	8	9	10	Final
South Korea (Ha) 🔨	0	1	0	1	0	0	0	1	0	0	3
Switzerland (Tirinzoni)	0	0	2	0	0	0	1	0	0	2	5

== Playoffs ==
Qualification games
4	Italy	3
5	Sweden	4
3	Canada	6
6	Japan	4

Semifinals
1	Switzerland	8
5	Sweden	4
2	Norway	8
3	Canada	5

Final
1	Switzerland	6
2	Norway	3
Bronze medal game
5	Sweden	5
3	Canada	8

=== Qualification games ===
Saturday, March 25, 10:00 am

Sheet A	1	2	3	4	5	6	7	8	9	10	11	Final
Canada (Einarson) 🔨	1	0	0	0	1	1	0	1	0	0	2	6
Japan (Fujisawa)	0	1	0	1	0	0	1	0	0	1	0	4

Player percentages
Canada		Japan	
Briane Harris	88%	Yurika Yoshida	88%
Shannon Birchard	92%	Yumi Suzuki	84%
Val Sweeting	80%	Chinami Yoshida	85%
Kerri Einarson	68%	Satsuki Fujisawa	66%
Total	82%	Total	81%

Sheet C	1	2	3	4	5	6	7	8	9	10	Final
Italy (Constantini) 🔨	0	0	0	0	0	2	0	0	1	0	3
Sweden (Hasselborg)	0	1	1	0	0	0	0	1	0	1	4

Player percentages
Italy		Sweden	
Giulia Zardini Lacedelli	88%	Sofia Mabergs	86%
Angela Romei	81%	Agnes Knochenhauer	83%
Marta Lo Deserto	84%	Sara McManus	94%
Stefania Constantini	71%	Anna Hasselborg	86%
Total	81%	Total	87%

=== Semifinals ===
Saturday, March 25, 4:00 pm

Sheet A	1	2	3	4	5	6	7	8	9	10	Final
Switzerland (Tirinzoni) 🔨	2	0	0	2	0	0	2	0	2	X	8
Sweden (Hasselborg)	0	0	2	0	0	1	0	1	0	X	4

Player percentages
Switzerland		Sweden	
Briar Schwaller-Hürlimann	82%	Sofia Mabergs	86%
Carole Howald	84%	Agnes Knochenhauer	86%
Silvana Tirinzoni	91%	Sara McManus	88%
Alina Pätz	91%	Anna Hasselborg	75%
Total	87%	Total	84%

Sheet C	1	2	3	4	5	6	7	8	9	10	Final
Norway (Rørvik) 🔨	1	0	0	3	0	0	1	0	3	X	8
Canada (Einarson)	0	0	2	0	1	1	0	1	0	X	5

Player percentages
Norway		Canada	
Martine Rønning	88%	Briane Harris	90%
Mille Haslev Nordbye	79%	Shannon Birchard	74%
Marianne Rørvik	64%	Val Sweeting	84%
Kristin Skaslien	79%	Kerri Einarson	76%
Total	77%	Total	81%

=== Bronze medal game ===
Sunday, March 26, 10:00 am

Sheet B	1	2	3	4	5	6	7	8	9	10	Final
Sweden (Hasselborg)	0	0	1	0	0	2	0	1	1	X	5
Canada (Einarson) 🔨	2	1	0	2	1	0	2	0	0	X	8

Player percentages
Sweden		Canada	
Sofia Mabergs	91%	Briane Harris	69%
Agnes Knochenhauer	61%	Shannon Birchard	88%
Sara McManus	82%	Val Sweeting	88%
Anna Hasselborg	72%	Kerri Einarson	86%
Total	77%	Total	82%

=== Final ===
Sunday, March 26, 3:00 pm

Sheet B	1	2	3	4	5	6	7	8	9	10	Final
Switzerland (Tirinzoni) 🔨	0	1	0	1	0	0	1	0	1	2	6
Norway (Rørvik)	0	0	0	0	2	0	0	1	0	0	3

Player percentages
Switzerland		Norway	
Briar Schwaller-Hürlimann	80%	Martine Rønning	89%
Carole Howald	79%	Mille Haslev Nordbye	84%
Silvana Tirinzoni	76%	Marianne Rørvik	75%
Alina Pätz	84%	Kristin Skaslien	79%
Total	80%	Total	82%

== Statistics ==
=== Player percentages ===
Final Round Robin Percentages

Key
All-Star Team

Leads	%
(Italy) Giulia Zardini Lacedelli	90.3
(Norway) Martine Rønning	89.5
(Canada) Briane Harris	88.7
(Scotland) Sophie Jackson	87.8
(United States) Tara Peterson	87.3
(Switzerland) Briar Schwaller-Hürlimann	86.8
(South Korea) Kim Su-jin	86.4
(Denmark) My Larsen	85.2
(Sweden) Sofia Mabergs	84.7
(Japan) Yurika Yoshida	83.8
(Turkey) Berfin Şengül	82.7
(Germany) Analena Jentsch	81.9
(New Zealand) Natalie Thurlow (Note: Includes five games throwing second rocks and one game throwing third rocks)	70.5
(New Zealand) Ruby Kinney (Note: Includes one game throwing second rocks; Played in seven games)	63.5

Seconds	%
(Norway) Mille Haslev Nordbye	84.9
(Switzerland) Carole Howald	83.4
(Canada) Shannon Birchard	83.2
(Sweden) Agnes Knochenhauer	82.0
(United States) Becca Hamilton	81.5
(Denmark) Denise Dupont (Note: Includes five games throwing third rocks)	79.8
(Japan) Yumi Suzuki	79.5
(South Korea) Yang Tae-i	79.2
(Germany) Pia-Lisa Schöll (Note: Played in seven games)	78.3
(Italy) Angela Romei	77.3
(Germany) Lena Kapp	76.2
(Scotland) Sophie Sinclair	75.0
(Turkey) İfayet Şafak Çalıkuşu (Note: Played in seven games)	74.2
(Turkey) Mihriban Polat	68.5
(New Zealand) Bridget Becker (Note: Includes seven games throwing fourth rocks)	64.1

Thirds	%
(United States) Cory Thiesse	83.6
(Switzerland) Silvana Tirinzoni (Skip)	82.4
(Sweden) Sara McManus	82.0
(Japan) Chinami Yoshida	81.8
(Norway) Marianne Rørvik (Skip)	80.7
(Scotland) Jennifer Dodds (Note: Played in five games)	79.7
(Germany) Emira Abbes	79.1
(South Korea) Kim Hye-rin	78.0
(Canada) Val Sweeting	77.6
(Italy) Marta Lo Deserto	77.4
(Turkey) Öznur Polat	77.0
(Scotland) Gina Aitken	73.6
(Denmark) Mathilde Halse (Note: Includes five games throwing second rocks)	73.3
(New Zealand) Holly Thompson	64.7

Skips	%
(Switzerland) Alina Pätz (Fourth)	88.5
(Italy) Stefania Constantini	80.4
(United States) Tabitha Peterson	79.7
(Sweden) Anna Hasselborg	76.6
(Canada) Kerri Einarson	76.4
(Norway) Kristin Skaslien (Fourth)	75.4
(Turkey) Dilşat Yıldız	74.4
(South Korea) Ha Seung-youn	74.3
(Denmark) Madeleine Dupont	73.8
(Japan) Satsuki Fujisawa	73.8
(Scotland) Rebecca Morrison	73.4
(Germany) Daniela Jentsch	71.4
(New Zealand) Jessica Smith	63.3

=== Perfect games ===
Minimum 10 shots thrown

Player	Team	Position	Shots	Opponent
Briar Schwaller-Hürlimann	Switzerland	Lead	12	Sweden
Carole Howald	Switzerland	Second	13	Germany
Alina Pätz	Switzerland	Fourth	14	Germany
Tabitha Peterson	United States	Skip	12	Denmark
Analena Jentsch	Germany	Lead	20	United States
Giulia Zardini Lacedelli	Italy	Lead	18	Sweden
Martine Rønning	Norway	Lead	19	Germany

== Awards ==
The awards and all-star team are as follows:

All-Star Team

- Fourth: Alina Pätz, Switzerland
- Third: Cory Thiesse, United States
- Second: Mille Haslev Nordbye, Norway
- Lead: Giulia Zardini Lacedelli, Italy

Frances Brodie Sportsmanship Award

- Bridget Becker, New Zealand

== Final standings ==
Place	Team
1st place, gold medalist(s)	Switzerland
2nd place, silver medalist(s)	Norway
3rd place, bronze medalist(s)	Canada
4	Sweden
5	Italy
5	Japan
7	United States
8	Turkey
9	South Korea
10	Germany
11	Denmark
12	Scotland
13	New Zealand

Based on this year's final standings, the European Curling Championship will get the 13th qualification spot at next year's World Women's Curling Championship.
