= Mia Höhne =

German curler

- Curler
- Born: 29 September 2000 (age 26); Ludwigshafen am Rhein

Team
- Curling club: CC Füssen, Füssen
- Skip: Emira Abbes
- Third: Mia Höhne
- Second: Lena Kapp
- Lead: Maike Beer
- Alternate: Pia-Lisa Schöll

Curling career
- Member Association: Germany
- World Championship: 3 (2019, 2021, 2022)
- European Championship: 3 (2019, 2021, 2023)
- Other appearances: World Junior-B Championships: 4 (2016, 2017, 2018, 2019 (Jan))
Medal record
Women's curling
Representing Germany
European Curling Championships
Bronze medal – third place	2021 Lillehammer

Mia Höhne (born 29 September 2000) is a German curler from Füssen. She currently plays third on the German National Women's Curling Team skipped by Emira Abbes.

== Career ==
Höhne skipped the German national junior women's curling team from 2016 to 2020. She never qualified for the World Junior Curling Championships through the World Junior B Curling Championships. She joined the women's rink of Daniela Jentsch as their alternate in 2019 and they went 5–7 at the 2019 World Women's Curling Championship.

Höhne was promoted to third on Team Jentsch when they represented Germany at the 2021 World Women's Curling Championship, which was played in a bio-secure bubble in Calgary, Canada due the ongoing pandemic. The team had to play with just three players as second Klara-Hermine Fomm and alternate Emira Abbes tested positive for COVID-19 upon their arrival, and had to be quarantined. At the Worlds, the threesome of Daniela Jentsch, Höhne and Analena Jentsch finished in ninth place with a 6–7 record.

Höhne joined Team Jentsch fulltime for the 2021–22 season. The team began at the 2021 Euro Super Series where they reached the semifinal round before losing to Rebecca Morrison. They also reached the semifinals of the 2021 Sherwood Park Women's Curling Classic where they were eliminated by Kerri Einarson. In October, the team won the Alberta Curling Series: Thistle tour event, defeating Kayla Skrlik in the final. At the 2021 European Curling Championships, Team Jentsch finished the round robin with a 6–3 record, qualifying for the playoffs again as the fourth seed. They then lost to Scotland's Eve Muirhead in the semifinal, however, were able to rebound to secure the bronze medal, once again defeating Russia's Alina Kovaleva rink in the bronze medal game. The team's next event was the 2021 Olympic Qualification Event, where they attempted to qualify for the 2022 Winter Olympics. After a slow start, they could not rebound in time to reach the qualification round, finishing in sixth place with a 3–5 record. In January, they competed in back-to-back tour events in Switzerland, reaching the semifinals of the St. Galler Elite Challenge and the final of the International Bernese Ladies Cup where they lost to Raphaela Keiser. Next for the team was the 2022 World Women's Curling Championship where they finished in ninth place with a 5–7 record. Because of their successful tour season, Team Jentsch had enough points to qualify for the year-end 2022 Players' Championship, their first top tier Grand Slam event. There, they finished with 2–3 record, just missing the playoff round.

Team Jentsch began the 2022–23 season at the 2022 Euro Super Series where they defeated Maia Ramsfjell, skipping Team Marianne Rørvik, 5–3 in the championship game. In the fall, the team played in two Grand Slam events, the 2022 National and the 2022 Tour Challenge, failing to qualify at both. At the 2022 European Curling Championships, Höhne was replaced in the lineup by Pia-Lisa Schöll and Lena Kapp, who alternated playing second on the team for the rest of the season.

Following the 2022–23 season, both Daniela and Analena Jentsch retired from competitive curling. Emira Abbes then took over as skip of the German team with Lena Kapp at third, Höhne at second and Maike Beer at lead.

== Personal life ==
As of 2020, she is employed as a sports soldier.

== Teams ==
Season	Skip	Third	Second	Lead	Alternate
2015–16	Maike Beer	Emira Abbes	Mia Höhne	Lena Kapp	Klara-Hermine Fomm
2016–17	Maike Beer	Mia Höhne	Laura Mayrhans	Lena Kapp	Fiona Wunderlich
2017–18	Mia Höhne	Lena Kapp	Laura Mayrhans	Sophia Roesel	Leonie Schöberl
2018–19	Mia Höhne	Lena Kapp	Laura Mayrhans	Leonie Schöberl	Fiona Wunderlich
2018–19	Daniela Jentsch	Emira Abbes	Klara-Hermine Fomm	Analena Jentsch	Mia Höhne
2019–20	Daniela Jentsch	Emira Abbes	Klara-Hermine Fomm	Analena Jentsch	Mia Höhne
2019–20	Mia Höhne	Lena Kapp	Kim Sutor	Zoé Antes	
2020–21	Daniela Jentsch	Mia Höhne	Klara-Hermine Fomm	Analena Jentsch	Emira Abbes
2021–22	Daniela Jentsch	Emira Abbes	Mia Höhne	Analena Jentsch	Klara-Hermine Fomm
2022–23	Daniela Jentsch	Emira Abbes	Mia Höhne	Analena Jentsch	
2023–24	Emira Abbes	Mia Höhne	Lena Kapp	Maike Beer	Pia-Lisa Schöll
