= 2021 Sherwood Park Women's Curling Classic =

- Host city: Sherwood Park, Alberta
- Arena: Sherwood Park Curling Club
- Dates: September 17–19
- Winner: (Manitoba) Team Fleury
- Curling club: East St. Paul CC, East St. Paul
- Skip: Tracy Fleury
- Third: Selena Njegovan
- Second: Liz Fyfe
- Lead: Kristin MacCuish
- Finalist: (Manitoba) Kerri Einarson

The 2021 Sherwood Park Women's Curling Classic was held from September 17 to 19 at the Sherwood Park Curling Club in Sherwood Park, Alberta. It was held as part of the Alberta Curling Series during the 2021–22 curling season. The event was held in a round-robin format with a $13,759 purse.

== Teams ==
The teams are listed as follows:

Skip	Third	Second	Lead	Alternate	Locale
Cory Christensen	Sarah Anderson	Vicky Persinger	Taylor Anderson		(United States) Chaska, Minnesota
Kerri Einarson	Val Sweeting	Shannon Birchard	Briane Meilleur		Gimli, Manitoba
Tracy Fleury	Selena Njegovan	Liz Fyfe	Kristin MacCuish		East St. Paul, Manitoba
Serena Gray-Withers	Zoe Cinnamon	Brianna Cullen	Emma Wiens	Anna Munroe	Edmonton, Alberta
Krysta Hilker	Karynn Flory	Sydney Lewko	Claire Murray	Kim Curtin	Edmonton, Alberta
Rachel Homan	Emma Miskew	Sarah Wilkes	Joanne Courtney		Ottawa, Ontario
Daniela Jentsch	Emira Abbes	Mia Höhne (Note: Alternate Mia Höhne moved up to play second, replacing Klara-Hermine Fomm.)	Analena Jentsch		Füssen, Germany
Jennifer Jones	Kaitlyn Lawes	Jocelyn Peterman	Dawn McEwen	Lisa Weagle	Winnipeg, Manitoba
Adele Kezama	Deanne Nichol	Meghan Chateauvert	Heather Steele		St. Albert, Alberta
Kim Eun-jung	Kim Kyeong-ae	Kim Cho-hi	Kim Seon-yeong	Kim Yeong-mi	Gangneung, South Korea
Kayla MacMillan	Jody Maskiewich	Lindsay Dubue	Sarah Loken		Vancouver, British Columbia
Melissa Pierce	Jennifer Van Wieren	Megan Anderson	Kelly Erickson		Edmonton, Alberta
Kelsey Rocque	Danielle Schmiemann	Dana Ferguson	Rachelle Brown		Edmonton, Alberta
Selena Sturmay	Abby Marks	Catherine Clifford	Paige Papley	Kate Goodhelpsen	Edmonton, Alberta
Laura Walker	Kate Cameron	Taylor McDonald	Heather Rogers (Note: Heather Rogers spared for Nadine Scotland.)		Edmonton, Alberta
Gabby Wood	Payton Sonnenberg	Brenna Bilassy	Ashleigh McKinnon	Shirley Thompson	Edmonton, Alberta

== Round-robin standings ==
Final round-robin standings

Key
Teams to Playoffs
Teams to Tiebreaker

Pool A	W	L	PF	PA
(Manitoba) Kerri Einarson	4	0	32	16
(United States) Cory Christensen	3	1	28	11
(Alberta) Selena Sturmay	1	3	20	31
(Alberta) Gabby Wood	0	4	12	33

Pool B	W	L	PF	PA
(Manitoba) Tracy Fleury	4	0	30	16
(Alberta) Laura Walker	3	1	32	16
(Alberta) Serena Gray-Withers	1	3	16	27
(Alberta) Krysta Hilker	0	4	16	36

Pool C	W	L	PF	PA
(Manitoba) Jennifer Jones	4	0	28	11
(British Columbia) Kayla MacMillan	2	2	21	21
(Alberta) Kelsey Rocque	1	3	17	20
(Alberta) Adele Kezama	0	4	9	29

Pool D	W	L	PF	PA
(Ontario) Rachel Homan	4	0	26	9
(Germany) Daniela Jentsch	3	1	21	17
(South Korea) Kim Eun-jung	2	2	25	16
(Alberta) Melissa Pierce	0	4	7	31

== Round-robin results ==
All draw times listed in Mountain Time (UTC−06:00).

=== Draw 1 ===
Friday, September 17, 2:00 pm

Sheet 1	1	2	3	4	5	6	7	8	9	Final
(Manitoba) Kerri Einarson 🔨	1	0	1	0	0	1	1	0	1	5
(United States) Cory Christensen	0	2	0	1	0	0	0	1	0	4

Sheet 2	1	2	3	4	5	6	7	8	9	Final
(Alberta) Selena Sturmay	0	2	0	0	1	1	3	0	1	8
(Alberta) Gabby Wood 🔨	3	0	2	1	0	0	0	1	0	7

Sheet 3	1	2	3	4	5	6	7	8	9	Final
(Manitoba) Tracy Fleury	0	1	0	0	4	0	1	0	1	7
(Alberta) Laura Walker 🔨	0	0	1	1	0	1	0	3	0	6

Sheet 4	1	2	3	4	5	6	7	8	Final
(Alberta) Krysta Hilker	0	0	3	1	1	0	0	0	5
(Alberta) Serena Gray-Withers 🔨	2	1	0	0	0	3	0	1	7

Sheet 5	1	2	3	4	5	6	7	8	Final
(Manitoba) Jennifer Jones 🔨	0	0	1	0	2	0	4	X	7
(Alberta) Kelsey Rocque	0	0	0	2	0	1	0	X	3

Sheet 6	1	2	3	4	5	6	7	8	Final
(British Columbia) Kayla MacMillan 🔨	1	0	4	1	0	2	0	X	8
(Alberta) Adele Kezama	0	1	0	0	1	0	1	X	3

Sheet 7	1	2	3	4	5	6	7	8	Final
(Ontario) Rachel Homan 🔨	0	0	0	2	2	1	0	X	5
(South Korea) Kim Eun-jung	1	1	0	0	0	0	1	X	3

Sheet 8	1	2	3	4	5	6	7	8	Final
(Germany) Daniela Jentsch 🔨	0	1	1	0	3	0	1	X	6
(Alberta) Melissa Pierce	0	0	0	1	0	2	0	X	3

=== Draw 2 ===
Friday, September 17, 7:00 pm

Sheet 1	1	2	3	4	5	6	7	8	Final
(Manitoba) Tracy Fleury	0	1	2	3	0	1	0	1	8
(Alberta) Krysta Hilker 🔨	4	0	0	0	1	0	1	0	6

Sheet 2	1	2	3	4	5	6	7	8	Final
(Alberta) Laura Walker 🔨	1	0	2	2	0	2	X	X	7
(Alberta) Serena Gray-Withers	0	1	0	0	1	0	X	X	2

Sheet 3	1	2	3	4	5	6	7	8	Final
(Manitoba) Kerri Einarson	0	0	2	0	2	5	0	X	9
(Alberta) Selena Sturmay 🔨	2	1	0	2	0	0	1	X	6

Sheet 4	1	2	3	4	5	6	7	8	Final
(United States) Cory Christensen 🔨	4	1	0	1	1	0	X	X	7
(Alberta) Gabby Wood	0	0	1	0	0	1	X	X	2

Sheet 5	1	2	3	4	5	6	7	8	Final
(Ontario) Rachel Homan 🔨	0	2	1	1	1	0	X	X	5
(Germany) Daniela Jentsch	0	0	0	0	0	1	X	X	1

Sheet 6	1	2	3	4	5	6	7	8	Final
(South Korea) Kim Eun-jung	1	3	0	2	0	3	X	X	9
(Alberta) Melissa Pierce 🔨	0	0	1	0	0	0	X	X	1

Sheet 7	1	2	3	4	5	6	7	8	9	Final
(Manitoba) Jennifer Jones 🔨	2	0	0	2	0	1	0	0	1	6
(Alberta) Kayla MacMillan	0	2	0	0	1	0	1	1	0	5

Sheet 8	1	2	3	4	5	6	7	8	Final
(Alberta) Kelsey Rocque 🔨	2	0	0	0	2	0	2	X	6
(Alberta) Adele Kezama	0	0	0	0	0	1	0	X	1

=== Draw 3 ===
Saturday, September 18, 9:00 am

Sheet 1	1	2	3	4	5	6	7	8	Final
(Ontario) Rachel Homan 🔨	5	1	0	2	X	X	X	X	8
(Alberta) Melissa Pierce	0	0	1	0	X	X	X	X	1

Sheet 2	1	2	3	4	5	6	7	8	Final
(South Korea) Kim Eun-jung 🔨	3	0	1	0	1	0	1	0	6
(Germany) Daniela Jentsch	0	2	0	2	0	3	0	1	8

Sheet 3	1	2	3	4	5	6	7	8	Final
(Manitoba) Jennifer Jones	2	3	1	1	0	X	X	X	7
(Alberta) Adele Kezama 🔨	0	0	0	0	1	X	X	X	1

Sheet 4	1	2	3	4	5	6	7	8	9	Final
(Alberta) Kelsey Rocque 🔨	1	0	0	2	0	0	0	2	0	5
(Alberta) Kayla MacMillan	0	0	1	0	2	0	2	0	1	6

Sheet 5	1	2	3	4	5	6	7	8	Final
(Manitoba) Kerri Einarson	5	2	0	0	0	3	X	X	10
(Alberta) Gabby Wood 🔨	0	0	1	1	1	0	X	X	3

Sheet 6	1	2	3	4	5	6	7	8	9	Final
(United States) Cory Christensen 🔨	0	0	1	1	1	0	1	0	1	5
(Alberta) Selena Sturmay	0	1	0	0	0	2	0	1	0	4

Sheet 7	1	2	3	4	5	6	7	8	Final
(Manitoba) Tracy Fleury 🔨	0	2	0	3	0	2	0	X	7
(Alberta) Serena Gray-Withers	0	0	1	0	2	0	1	X	4

Sheet 8	1	2	3	4	5	6	7	8	Final
(Alberta) Laura Walker 🔨	0	0	0	2	0	2	3	2	9
(Alberta) Krysta Hilker	1	1	0	0	3	0	0	0	5

=== Draw 4 ===
Saturday, September 18, 2:00 pm

Sheet 1	1	2	3	4	5	6	7	8	Final
(British Columbia) Kayla MacMillan	0	1	0	0	1	0	X	X	2
(South Korea) Kim Eun-jung 🔨	1	0	1	1	0	4	X	X	7

Sheet 2	1	2	3	4	5	6	7	8	Final
(Alberta) Adele Kezama	0	0	1	2	0	0	1	X	4
(Ontario) Rachel Homan 🔨	4	1	0	0	2	1	0	X	8

Sheet 3	1	2	3	4	5	6	7	8	Final
(Alberta) Kelsey Rocque	0	2	0	0	1	0	0	X	3
(Germany) Daniela Jentsch 🔨	1	0	1	4	0	0	0	X	6

Sheet 4	1	2	3	4	5	6	7	8	Final
(Manitoba) Jennifer Jones 🔨	1	1	0	2	0	4	X	X	8
(Alberta) Melissa Pierce	0	0	1	0	1	0	X	X	2

Sheet 5	1	2	3	4	5	6	7	8	Final
(United States) Cory Christensen 🔨	2	4	3	3	X	X	X	X	12
(Alberta) Krysta Hilker	0	0	0	0	X	X	X	X	0

Sheet 6	1	2	3	4	5	6	7	8	Final
(Manitoba) Kerri Einarson 🔨	2	0	2	0	4	X	X	X	8
(Alberta) Serena Gray-Withers	0	1	0	2	0	X	X	X	3

Sheet 7	1	2	3	4	5	6	7	8	Final
(Alberta) Selena Sturmay	0	0	0	0	2	0	X	X	2
(Alberta) Laura Walker 🔨	0	2	1	2	0	5	X	X	10

Sheet 8	1	2	3	4	5	6	7	8	Final
(Alberta) Gabby Wood	0	0	0	X	X	X	X	X	0
(Manitoba) Tracy Fleury 🔨	5	2	1	X	X	X	X	X	8

== Tiebreaker ==
Saturday, September 18, 7:00 pm

Sheet 7	1	2	3	4	5	6	7	8	Final
(British Columbia) Kayla MacMillan	0	0	1	0	0	1	X	X	2
(South Korea) Kim Eun-jung 🔨	0	3	0	3	1	0	X	X	7

== Playoffs ==
Quarterfinals
1	(Manitoba) Jennifer Jones	3
8	(South Korea) Kim Eun-jung	7
4	(Manitoba) Tracy Fleury	7
5	(United States) Cory Christensen	5
3	(Manitoba) Kerri Einarson	6
6	(Alberta) Laura Walker	2
2	(Ontario) Rachel Homan	4
7	(Germany) Daniela Jentsch	5

Semifinals
8	(South Korea) Kim Eun-jung	3
4	(Manitoba) Tracy Fleury	7
3	(Manitoba) Kerri Einarson	8
7	(Germany) Daniela Jentsch	2

Final
4	(Manitoba) Tracy Fleury	6
3	(Manitoba) Kerri Einarson	4

=== Quarterfinals ===
Sunday, September 19, 9:00 am

Sheet 3	1	2	3	4	5	6	7	8	Final
(Manitoba) Jennifer Jones 🔨	0	0	1	1	0	1	X	X	3
(South Korea) Kim Eun-jung	1	0	0	0	6	0	X	X	7

Sheet 4	1	2	3	4	5	6	7	8	Final
(Manitoba) Kerri Einarson 🔨	0	0	1	1	1	1	2	X	6
(Alberta) Laura Walker	0	2	0	0	0	0	0	X	2

Sheet 5	1	2	3	4	5	6	7	8	9	Final
(Ontario) Rachel Homan 🔨	0	1	0	0	2	1	0	0	0	4
(Germany) Daniela Jentsch	0	0	1	2	0	0	0	1	1	5

Sheet 6	1	2	3	4	5	6	7	8	Final
(Manitoba) Tracy Fleury 🔨	0	3	0	2	0	0	1	1	7
(United States) Cory Christensen	2	0	1	0	2	0	0	0	5

=== Semifinals ===
Sunday, September 19, 1:00 pm

Sheet 5	1	2	3	4	5	6	7	8	Final
(South Korea) Kim Eun-jung	0	0	1	0	0	2	0	X	3
(Manitoba) Tracy Fleury 🔨	0	2	0	2	1	0	2	X	7

Sheet 6	1	2	3	4	5	6	7	8	Final
(Manitoba) Kerri Einarson 🔨	2	3	0	3	X	X	X	X	8
(Germany) Daniela Jentsch	0	0	2	0	X	X	X	X	2

=== Final ===
Sunday, September 19, 5:00 pm

Sheet 7	1	2	3	4	5	6	7	8	Final
(Manitoba) Tracy Fleury 🔨	0	0	1	0	3	0	1	1	6
(Manitoba) Kerri Einarson	1	0	0	1	0	2	0	0	4
