= 2019 Cargill Curling Training Centre Icebreaker =

World Curling Tour event

- Host city: Morris, Manitoba
- Dates: August 23–25
- Men's winner: (Manitoba) Team Gunnlaugson
- Curling club: Granite CC, Winnipeg
- Skip: Jason Gunnlaugson
- Third: Alex Forrest
- Second: Adam Casey
- Lead: Connor Njegovan
- Finalist: (Manitoba) Ty Dilello
- Women's winner: (Manitoba) Team Fleury
- Curling club: East St. Paul CC, East St. Paul
- Skip: Tracy Fleury
- Third: Selena Njegovan
- Second: Liz Fyfe
- Lead: Kristin MacCuish
- Finalist: (Japan) Tori Koana

The 2019 Cargill Curling Training Centre Icebreaker was held from August 23 to 25 in Morris, Manitoba. It was the fourth event of the 2019–20 curling season. The total purse for the event was $7,480 on both the Men's and Women's side.

In the Men's event, Jason Gunnlaugson defeated Ty Dilello 7–5 in the final and in the Women's event, Tracy Fleury defeated Tori Koana 5–3 in the final.

== Men ==
=== Teams ===
The teams are listed as follows:

Skip	Third	Second	Lead	Locale
Jed Brundidge	Evan Workin	Nic Wagner	Cameron Rittenour	(United States) St. Paul Minnesota
Braden Calvert	Kyle Kurz	Ian McMillan	Rob Gordon	Winnipeg, Manitoba
Ty Dilello	Hayden Forrester	Brennan Sampson	Brendan Wilson	Winnipeg, Manitoba
Jacques Gauthier	Jordan Peters	Brayden Payette	Zack Bilawka	Winnipeg, Manitoba
Jason Gunnlaugson	Alex Forrest	Adam Casey	Connor Njegovan	Winnipeg, Manitoba
Kohsuke Hirata	Yoshiya Miura	Hiromu Otani	Yuto Kamada	Kitami, Japan
Tanner Horgan	Colton Lott	Kyle Doering	Tanner Lott	Winnipeg Beach, Manitoba
Ross LaVallee	Shawn Demianyk	Chris Stewart	Kayle Miller	Winnipeg, Manitoba
Greg Persinger (Fourth)	Rich Ruohonen (Skip)	Colin Hufman	Phil Tilker	(United States) Minneapolis, Minnesota
JT Ryan	Colin Kurz	Brendan Bilawka	Cole Chandler	Winnipeg, Manitoba
Brett Walter	Thomas Dunlop	Zachary Wasylik	Lawson Yates	Winnipeg, Manitoba
Tsuyoshi Yamaguchi	Riku Yamagisawa	Satoshi Koizumi	Fukuhiro Ohno	Nagano, Japan

=== Knockout Brackets ===
==== A Event ====
A Event			Qualifier 1
1	(Manitoba) Jason Gunnlaugson	11
1	(Manitoba) Ross LaVallee	2	7	(Manitoba) Jason Gunnlaugson	9
2	(Manitoba) JT Ryan	3	7	(United States) Jed Brundidge	4
2	(United States) Jed Brundidge	5

A Event			Qualifier 2
3	(Manitoba) Braden Calvert	6
3	(Japan) Kohsuke Hirata	4	8	(Manitoba) Braden Calvert	6
4	(Manitoba) Ty Dilello	6	8	(Manitoba) Ty Dilello	3
4	(Manitoba) Brett Walter	5

A Event			Qualifier 3
5	(United States) Rich Ruohonen	7
5	(Japan) Tsuyoshi Yamaguchi	5	9	(United States) Rich Ruohonen	2
6	(Manitoba) Tanner Horgan	4	9	(Manitoba) Tanner Horgan	6
6	(Manitoba) Jacques Gauthier	2

==== B Event ====
B Event			Qualifier 4
10	(Manitoba) Ross LaVallee	4
10	(Manitoba) JT Ryan	5	13	(Manitoba) JT Ryan	9
			13	(United States) Jed Brundidge	6

B Event			Qualifier 5
11	(Japan) Kohsuke Hirata	7
11	(Manitoba) Brett Walter	3	14	(Japan) Kohsuke Hirata	5
			14	(Manitoba) Ty Dilello	8

B Event			Qualifier 6
12	(Japan) Tsuyoshi Yamaguchi	8
12	(Manitoba) Jacques Gauthier	1	15	(Japan) Tsuyoshi Yamaguchi	2
			15	(United States) Rich Ruohonen	7

=== Knockout results ===
==== Draw 1 ====
Friday, August 23, 6:00 pm

Sheet 1	1	2	3	4	5	6	7	8	9	Final
(Manitoba) Ty Dilello	0	0	1	0	2	0	2	0	1	6
(Manitoba) Brett Walter 🔨	1	1	0	1	0	1	0	1	0	5

Sheet 2	1	2	3	4	5	6	7	8	Final
(United States) Rich Ruohonen 🔨	2	1	0	1	0	2	0	1	7
(Japan) Tsuyoshi Yamaguchi	0	0	2	0	2	0	1	0	5

Sheet 3	1	2	3	4	5	6	7	8	Final
(Manitoba) Jason Gunnlaugson 🔨	2	3	2	0	4	X	X	X	11
(Manitoba) Ross LaVallee	0	0	0	2	0	X	X	X	2

Sheet 4	1	2	3	4	5	6	7	8	Final
(Manitoba) Braden Calvert 🔨	2	0	2	0	0	2	0	X	6
(Japan) Kohsuke Hirata	0	1	0	0	2	0	1	X	4

Sheet 5	1	2	3	4	5	6	7	8	Final
(Manitoba) Tanner Horgan	0	1	1	0	0	1	0	1	4
(Manitoba) Jacques Gauthier 🔨	0	0	0	1	0	0	1	0	2

Sheet 6	1	2	3	4	5	6	7	8	Final
(Manitoba) JT Ryan	0	0	2	0	0	0	1	0	3
(United States) Jed Brundidge 🔨	1	0	0	1	1	1	0	1	5

==== Draw 3 ====
Saturday, August 24, 10:00 am

Sheet 1	1	2	3	4	5	6	7	8	Final
(Manitoba) Ross LaVallee	0	0	0	2	0	1	1	0	4
(Manitoba) JT Ryan 🔨	2	1	0	0	1	0	0	1	5

Sheet 2	1	2	3	4	5	6	7	8	Final
(Manitoba) Braden Calvert 🔨	2	0	1	1	1	0	1	X	6
(Manitoba) Ty Dilello	0	1	0	0	0	2	0	X	3

Sheet 3	1	2	3	4	5	6	7	8	Final
(United States) Rich Ruohonen	0	0	0	2	0	0	X	X	2
(Manitoba) Tanner Horgan 🔨	0	1	2	0	1	2	X	X	6

Sheet 4	1	2	3	4	5	6	7	8	Final
(Manitoba) Jason Gunnlaugson	0	0	2	2	1	0	1	3	9
(United States) Jed Brundidge 🔨	1	2	0	0	0	1	0	0	4

Sheet 5	1	2	3	4	5	6	7	8	Final
(Japan) Kohsuke Hirata 🔨	1	0	2	1	0	0	1	2	7
(Manitoba) Brett Walter	0	1	0	0	1	1	0	0	3

Sheet 6	Final
(Japan) Tsuyoshi Yamaguchi 🔨	8
(Manitoba) Jacques Gauthier	1

==== Draw 5 ====
Saturday, August 24, 4:00 pm

Sheet 1	1	2	3	4	5	6	7	8	Final
(Japan) Tsuyoshi Yamaguchi 🔨	0	0	1	0	0	1	X	X	2
(United States) Rich Ruohonen	1	2	0	1	3	0	X	X	7

Sheet 2	1	2	3	4	5	6	7	8	Final
(Manitoba) JT Ryan 🔨	0	2	2	0	2	0	3	X	9
(United States) Jed Brundidge	1	0	0	2	0	3	0	X	6

Sheet 3	1	2	3	4	5	6	7	8	Final
(Japan) Kohsuke Hirata	0	0	2	0	0	0	3	0	5
(Manitoba) Ty Dilello 🔨	1	1	0	1	1	3	0	1	8

=== Playoffs ===
Quarterfinals
4	(Manitoba) JT Ryan	7
6	(United States) Rich Ruohonen	6
3	(Manitoba) Tanner Horgan	4
5	(Manitoba) Ty Dilello	5

Semifinals
1	(Manitoba) Jason Gunnlaugson	8
4	(Manitoba) JT Ryan	4
2	(Manitoba) Braden Calvert	4
5	(Manitoba) Ty Dilello	7

Final
1	(Manitoba) Jason Gunnlaugson	7
5	(Manitoba) Ty Dilello	5

==== Quarterfinals ====
Sunday, August 25, 9:00 am

Team	1	2	3	4	5	6	7	8	Final
(Manitoba) JT Ryan 🔨	2	1	0	1	0	1	0	2	7
(United States) Rich Ruohonen	0	0	1	0	2	0	3	0	6

Team	1	2	3	4	5	6	7	8	Final
(Manitoba) Tanner Horgan 🔨	1	1	1	0	1	0	0	0	4
(Manitoba) Ty Dilello	0	0	0	2	0	2	0	1	5

==== Semifinals ====
Sunday, August 25, 12:00 pm

Team	1	2	3	4	5	6	7	8	Final
(Manitoba) Jason Gunnlaugson 🔨	3	0	1	1	0	3	X	X	8
(Manitoba) JT Ryan	0	2	0	0	2	0	X	X	4

Team	1	2	3	4	5	6	7	8	Final
(Manitoba) Braden Calvert 🔨	0	0	1	0	0	3	0	0	4
(Manitoba) Ty Dilello	0	1	0	2	0	0	3	1	7

==== Final ====
Sunday, August 25, 3:00 pm

Team	1	2	3	4	5	6	7	8	Final
(Manitoba) Jason Gunnlaugson 🔨	2	0	0	0	2	3	0	X	7
(Manitoba) Ty Dilello	0	2	0	2	0	0	1	X	5

== Women ==
=== Teams ===
The teams are listed as follows:

Skip	Third	Second	Lead	Locale
Abby Ackland	Hailey Ryan	Emilie Rafnson	Sara Oliver	Winnipeg, Manitoba
Theresa Cannon	Karen Klein	Vanessa Foster	Raunora Westcott	Winnipeg, Manitoba
Tracy Fleury	Selena Njegovan	Liz Fyfe	Kristin MacCuish	East St. Paul, Manitoba
Miki Hayashi	Yako Matsuzawa	Kairi Ito	Manami Ohara	Sapporo, Japan
Daniela Jentsch	Emira Abbes	Klara-Hermine Fomm	Analena Jentsch	Füssen, Germany
Tori Koana	Yuna Kotani	Mao Ishigaki	Arisa Kotani	Yamanashi, Japan
Alina Kovaleva	Maria Komarova	Galina Arsenkina	Ekaterina Kuzmina	Saint Petersburg, Russia
Beth Peterson	Jenna Loder	Katherine Doerksen	Melissa Gordon	Winnipeg, Manitoba
Darcy Robertson	Laura Burtnyk	Gaetanne Gauthier	Krysten Karwacki	Winnipeg, Manitoba
Laura Walker	Kate Cameron	Taylor McDonald	Nadine Scotland	Edmonton, Alberta
Sayaka Yoshimura	Kaho Onodera	Anna Ohmiya	Yumie Funayama	Sapporo, Japan
Mackenzie Zacharias	Karlee Burgess	Emily Zacharias	Lauren Lenentine	Altona, Manitoba

=== Knockout Brackets ===
==== A Event ====
A Event			Qualifier 1
1	(Manitoba) Tracy Fleury	6
1	(Japan) Miki Hayashi	4	7	(Manitoba) Tracy Fleury	5
2	(Alberta) Laura Walker	8	7	(Alberta) Laura Walker	4
2	(Manitoba) Beth Peterson	3

A Event			Qualifier 2
3	(Japan) Sayaka Yoshimura	6
3	(Manitoba) Mackenzie Zacharias	7	8	(Manitoba) Mackenzie Zacharias	5
4	(Russia) Alina Kovaleva	5	8	(Russia) Alina Kovaleva	6
4	(Manitoba) Darcy Robertson	2

A Event			Qualifier 3
5	(Manitoba) Theresa Cannon	5
5	(Manitoba) Abby Ackland	2	9	(Manitoba) Theresa Cannon	4
6	(Germany) Daniela Jentsch	4	9	(Japan) Tori Koana	8
6	(Japan) Tori Koana	7

==== B Event ====
B Event			Qualifier 4
10	(Japan) Miki Hayashi	1
10	(Manitoba) Beth Peterson	5	13	(Manitoba) Beth Peterson	5
			13	(Alberta) Laura Walker	4

B Event			Qualifier 5
11	(Japan) Sayaka Yoshimura	7
11	(Manitoba) Darcy Robertson	1	14	(Japan) Sayaka Yoshimura	6
			14	(Manitoba) Mackenzie Zacharias	5

B Event			Qualifier 6
12	(Manitoba) Abby Ackland	2
12	(Germany) Daniela Jentsch	10	15	(Germany) Daniela Jentsch	7
			15	(Manitoba) Theresa Cannon	4

=== Knockout results ===
==== Draw 2 ====
Friday, August 23, 9:00 pm

Sheet 1	1	2	3	4	5	6	7	8	Final
(Russia) Alina Kovaleva 🔨	2	1	0	0	0	1	1	X	5
(Manitoba) Darcy Robertson	0	0	0	2	0	0	0	X	2

Sheet 2	1	2	3	4	5	6	7	8	Final
(Manitoba) Theresa Cannon	0	1	1	1	2	0	1	X	6
(Manitoba) Abby Ackland 🔨	1	0	0	0	0	1	0	X	2

Sheet 3	1	2	3	4	5	6	7	8	Final
(Manitoba) Tracy Fleury	0	0	3	1	0	2	X	X	6
(Japan) Miki Hayashi 🔨	2	1	0	0	1	0	X	X	4

Sheet 4	1	2	3	4	5	6	7	8	9	Final
(Japan) Sayaka Yoshimura 🔨	1	0	2	0	0	2	0	1	0	6
(Manitoba) Mackenzie Zacharias	0	2	0	1	2	0	1	0	1	7

Sheet 5	1	2	3	4	5	6	7	8	Final
(Germany) Daniela Jentsch 🔨	0	0	2	0	0	2	0	0	4
(Japan) Tori Koana	2	0	0	0	2	0	2	1	7

Sheet 6	1	2	3	4	5	6	7	8	Final
(Alberta) Laura Walker	0	2	0	3	3	X	X	X	8
(Manitoba) Beth Peterson 🔨	2	0	1	0	0	X	X	X	3

==== Draw 4 ====
Saturday, August 24, 1:00 pm

Sheet 1	1	2	3	4	5	6	7	8	Final
(Japan) Miki Hayashi 🔨	0	0	1	0	0	0	0	X	1
(Manitoba) Beth Peterson	0	2	0	0	0	2	1	X	5

Sheet 2	1	2	3	4	5	6	7	8	Final
(Manitoba) Mackenzie Zacharias	0	0	0	0	3	0	1	1	5
(Russia) Alina Kovaleva 🔨	0	3	0	1	0	2	0	0	6

Sheet 3	1	2	3	4	5	6	7	8	Final
(Manitoba) Theresa Cannon	0	2	0	2	0	0	0	X	4
(Japan) Tori Koana 🔨	1	0	2	0	2	2	1	X	8

Sheet 4	1	2	3	4	5	6	7	8	9	Final
(Manitoba) Tracy Fleury 🔨	0	1	0	0	0	2	1	0	1	5
(Alberta) Laura Walker	0	0	2	0	1	0	0	1	0	4

Sheet 5	1	2	3	4	5	6	7	8	Final
(Japan) Sayaka Yoshimura 🔨	0	2	0	1	4	0	X	X	7
(Manitoba) Darcy Robertson	0	0	0	0	0	1	X	X	1

Sheet 6	1	2	3	4	5	6	7	8	Final
(Manitoba) Abby Ackland	2	0	0	0	0	X	X	X	2
(Germany) Daniela Jentsch 🔨	0	5	3	1	1	X	X	X	10

==== Draw 5 ====
Saturday, August 24, 4:00 pm

Sheet 4	1	2	3	4	5	6	7	8	Final
(Japan) Sayaka Yoshimura 🔨	1	0	1	0	0	2	0	2	6
(Manitoba) Mackenzie Zacharias	0	1	0	2	1	0	1	0	5

Sheet 5	1	2	3	4	5	6	7	8	Final
(Manitoba) Beth Peterson 🔨	0	2	1	0	0	2	0	0	5
(Alberta) Laura Walker	0	0	0	2	0	0	1	1	4

Sheet 6	1	2	3	4	5	6	7	8	Final
(Germany) Daniela Jentsch 🔨	1	1	0	0	4	0	1	X	7
(Manitoba) Theresa Cannon	0	0	2	1	0	1	0	X	4

=== Playoffs ===
Quarterfinals
5	(Japan) Sayaka Yoshimura	5
4	(Manitoba) Beth Peterson	3
3	(Japan) Tori Koana	6
6	(Germany) Daniela Jentsch	5

Semifinals
1	(Manitoba) Tracy Fleury	6
5	(Japan) Sayaka Yoshimura	5
2	(Russia) Alina Kovaleva	1
3	(Japan) Tori Koana	5

Final
1	(Manitoba) Tracy Fleury	5
3	(Japan) Tori Koana	3

==== Quarterfinals ====
Sunday, August 25, 9:00 am

Team	1	2	3	4	5	6	7	8	Final
(Japan) Sayaka Yoshimura	0	2	0	1	0	0	1	1	5
(Manitoba) Beth Peterson 🔨	0	0	2	0	0	1	0	0	3

Team	1	2	3	4	5	6	7	8	Final
(Japan) Tori Koana	2	0	2	0	1	0	0	1	6
(Germany) Daniela Jentsch 🔨	0	1	0	1	0	3	0	0	5

==== Semifinals ====
Sunday, August 25, 12:00 pm

Team	1	2	3	4	5	6	7	8	Final
(Manitoba) Tracy Fleury 🔨	1	0	0	2	0	1	0	2	6
(Japan) Sayaka Yoshimura	0	2	1	0	1	0	1	0	5

Team	1	2	3	4	5	6	7	8	Final
(Russia) Alina Kovaleva 🔨	0	0	0	0	1	0	0	X	1
(Japan) Tori Koana	0	0	1	2	0	1	1	X	5

==== Final ====
Sunday, August 25, 3:00 pm

Team	1	2	3	4	5	6	7	8	Final
(Manitoba) Tracy Fleury 🔨	1	0	0	1	0	0	2	1	5
(Japan) Tori Koana	0	2	0	0	0	1	0	0	3
