= Klara-Hermine Fomm =

German curler

- Curler
- Born: Klara-Hermine Fomm; 26 October 1999 (age 27); Dippoldiswalde

Team
- Curling club: 1.SCV Geising; Geising, GER
- Skip: Klara-Hermine Fomm
- Third: Sara Messenzehl
- Second: Elisa Scheuerl
- Lead: Emm Müller

Curling career
- Member Association: Germany
- World Championship: 2 (2019, 2022)
- European Championship: 3 (2018, 2019, 2021)
Medal record
Women's curling
Representing Germany
European Curling Championships
Bronze medal – third place	2018 Tallinn
Bronze medal – third place	2021 Lillehammer

Klara-Hermine Fomm also known as Klara Fomm (born 26 October 1999) is a German curler from Dresden. She currently skips her own team out of Füssen.

== Career ==
Fomm was the alternate for the German team at the 2016 World Junior B Curling Championships, skipped by Maike Beer. The team finished in eleventh place.

Fomm joined the German women's national team in 2018, initially at lead position. The German team would have success at the Europeans. The team reached the playoffs at Fomm's first European Curling Championships with a 5–4 record. In the semifinal, they lost to the Swiss team Silvana Tirinzoni 6–4. In the bronze medal game though, the Germans turned things around. The team would win the game 7–4, winning them the bronze medal. It was her first medal at an international competition. Fomm won her first tour event this season. Two months after the Europeans, the team won the Qinghai Curling Elite. At the Worlds, her team of Daniela Jentsch, Emira Abbes and Analena Jentsch were sitting at 4–6 after their tenth game with two still to go. The team had another chance to clinch a playoff spot. But once again they lost their next game eliminating them from contention. The team did have a good final game though, beating eventual winners Switzerland 10–8 after scoring four in the last end.

Team Jentsch's first event of the 2019–20 season was at the 2019 Cargill Curling Training Centre Icebreaker where they lost in the quarterfinals. They also had playoff appearances at the 2019 Cameron's Brewing Oakville Fall Classic and the Prestige Hotels & Resorts Curling Classic making the semifinals in both events. The German team also qualified for their first Grand Slam of Curling event, the 2019 Tour Challenge Tier 2 where they went 1–3, missing the playoffs. At the 2019 European Curling Championships, the team did not qualify for the playoffs like in 2018, finishing the round-robin in fifth place with a 5–4 record. The team was set to represent Germany at the 2020 World Women's Curling Championship before the event got cancelled due to the COVID-19 pandemic.

Team Jentsch represented Germany at the 2021 World Women's Curling Championship, which was played in a bio-secure bubble in Calgary, Canada due the ongoing pandemic. Fomm travelled with the team to Calgary, but tested positive for COVID-19 upon her arrival, along with teammate Emira Abbes. The two could not play with rest of the team (which played with just three players), and had to be isolated in their hotel rooms. At the Worlds, the German threesome finished in ninth place with a 6–7 record.

The 2021–22 season began for Team Jentsch at the 2021 Euro Super Series where they reached the semifinal round before losing to Rebecca Morrison. They also reached the semifinals of the 2021 Sherwood Park Women's Curling Classic where they were eliminated by Kerri Einarson. In October, the team won the Alberta Curling Series: Thistle tour event, defeating Kayla Skrlik in the final. At the 2021 European Curling Championships, Team Jentsch finished the round robin with a 6–3 record, qualifying for the playoffs again as the fourth seed. They then lost to Scotland's Eve Muirhead in the semifinal, however, were able to rebound to secure the bronze medal, once again defeating Russia's Alina Kovaleva rink in the bronze medal game. The team's next event was the 2021 Olympic Qualification Event, where they attempted to qualify for the 2022 Winter Olympics. After a slow start, they could not rebound in time to reach the qualification round, finishing in sixth place with a 3–5 record. In January, they competed in back-to-back tour events in Switzerland, reaching the semifinals of the St. Galler Elite Challenge and the final of the International Bernese Ladies Cup where they lost to Raphaela Keiser. Next for the team was the 2022 World Women's Curling Championship where they finished in ninth place with a 5–7 record. Because of their successful tour season, Team Jentsch had enough points to qualify for the year-end 2022 Players' Championship, their first top tier Grand Slam event. There, they finished with 2–3 record, just missing the playoff round.

== Personal life ==
As of 2020 Fomm is a student.
