= Analena Jentsch =

German curler

- Curler
- Born: Analena Jentsch; 28 May 1997 (age 29); Füssen, Germany

Team
- Curling club: CC Füssen; Füssen, GER

Curling career
- Member Association: Germany
- World Championship: 8 (2015, 2016, 2017, 2018, 2019, 2021, 2022, 2023)
- European Championship: 7 (2015, 2016, 2017, 2018, 2019, 2021, 2022)
Medal record
Women's curling
Representing Germany
European Curling Championships
Bronze medal – third place	2018 Tallinn
Bronze medal – third place	2021 Lillehammer

Analena Jentsch (born 28 May 1997) is a retired German curler from Füssen. She formerly played lead on the German National Women's Curling Team skipped by her sister Daniela Jentsch.

== Career ==
When she was 17, Jentsch participated in her first World Women's Curling Championship at the 2015 World Women's Curling Championship. Her team of her sister Daniela Jentsch at skip, Stella Heiß at second and Pia-Lisa Schöll at lead beat top teams Sweden and United States before losing their last five games to finish with a record of 4–7. Jentsch played in her first European Curling Championships the following season at the 2015 European Curling Championships as third for the German team. The team missed the playoffs with a 4–5 record but did qualify their country for the 2016 World Championship. The team struggled during the week of the World Championships, finishing the round robin in tenth place with a 3–8 record.

The next season, Jentsch would win her first World Curling Tour event, the Latvia International Challenger. At the 2016 Euros, the German team finished 4–5 again which was once again enough to qualify for the 2017 Worlds. At the Worlds, the team was sitting at 5–4 with two games left. The Germans had a chance to qualify for the playoffs. They would lose their last two games to Scotland and Czech Republic, ending their chance of reaching the playoffs. That season, the German team was met with disappointment. They tried to qualify for the Olympic Games, at the 2018 Winter Olympic qualification event, but they finished with a record of 2–4, missing the playoffs.

The next season, the team once again qualified for the Worlds after going 3–6 at the Euros. But like in 2016, the team struggled at the World Championship, finishing in twelfth with a 3–9 record. The following season, the German team would have success at the Europeans. They reached the playoffs for the first time in their careers with a 5–4 record. In the semifinal, they lost to the Swiss team Silvana Tirinzoni 6–4. In the bronze medal game though, the Germans turned things around. The team would win the game 7–4, winning them the Bronze Medal. It was her first medal at an international competition. Jentsch also won her second tour event this season. Two months after the Europeans, the team won the Qinghai Curling Elite. At the Worlds, her team of Daniela Jentsch, Emira Abbes and Klara-Hermine Fomm were sitting at 4–6 after their tenth game with two still to go. The team had another chance to clinch a playoff spot. But once again they lost their next game eliminating them from contention. The team did have a good final game though, beating eventual winners Switzerland 10–8 after scoring four in the last end.

Team Jentsch's first event of the 2019–20 season was at the 2019 Cargill Curling Training Centre Icebreaker where they lost in the quarterfinals. They also had playoff appearances at the 2019 Cameron's Brewing Oakville Fall Classic and the Prestige Hotels & Resorts Curling Classic making the semifinals in both events. The German team also qualified for their first Grand Slam of Curling event, the 2019 Tour Challenge Tier 2 where they went 1–3, missing the playoffs. At the 2019 European Curling Championships, the team did not qualify for the playoffs like in 2018, finishing the round-robin in fifth place with a 5–4 record. The team was set to represent Germany at the 2020 World Women's Curling Championship before the event got cancelled due to the COVID-19 pandemic.

Team Jentsch represented Germany at the 2021 World Women's Curling Championship, which was played in a bio-secure bubble in Calgary, Canada, due the ongoing pandemic. The team had to play with just three players as second Klara-Hermine Fomm and alternate Emira Abbes tested positive for COVID-19 upon their arrival, and had to be quarantined. At the Worlds, the threesome of Daniela Jentsch, Mia Höhne and Jentsch finished in ninth place with a 6–7 record.

The 2021–22 season began for Team Jentsch at the 2021 Euro Super Series where they reached the semifinal round before losing to Rebecca Morrison. They also reached the semifinals of the 2021 Sherwood Park Women's Curling Classic where they were eliminated by Kerri Einarson. In October, the team won the Alberta Curling Series: Thistle tour event, defeating Kayla Skrlik in the final. At the 2021 European Curling Championships, Team Jentsch finished the round robin with a 6–3 record, qualifying for the playoffs again as the fourth seed. They then lost to Scotland's Eve Muirhead in the semifinal, however, were able to rebound to secure the bronze medal, once again defeating Russia's Alina Kovaleva rink in the bronze medal game. The team's next event was the 2021 Olympic Qualification Event, where they attempted to qualify for the 2022 Winter Olympics. After a slow start, they could not rebound in time to reach the qualification round, finishing in sixth place with a 3–5 record. In January, they competed in back-to-back tour events in Switzerland, reaching the semifinals of the St. Galler Elite Challenge and the final of the International Bernese Ladies Cup where they lost to Raphaela Keiser. Next for the team was the 2022 World Women's Curling Championship where they finished in ninth place with a 5–7 record. Because of their successful tour season, Team Jentsch had enough points to qualify for the year-end 2022 Players' Championship, their first top tier Grand Slam event. There, they finished with 2–3 record, just missing the playoff round.

Team Jentsch began the 2022–23 season at the 2022 Euro Super Series where they defeated Maia Ramsfjell, skipping Team Marianne Rørvik, 5–3 in the championship game. In the fall, the team played in two Grand Slam events, the 2022 National and the 2022 Tour Challenge, failing to qualify at both. Unlike 2021, the team could not qualify for the playoffs at the 2022 European Curling Championships, finishing seventh overall with a 5–4 record. After failing to reach the playoffs in seven straight events, Team Jentsch turned things around in the new year. They won back-to-back titles at the 2023 New Year Medalist Curling and the 2023 Mercure Perth Masters after going on a twelve-game win streak. They also had quarterfinal appearances at the St. Galler Elite Challenge and the 2023 International Bernese Ladies Cup. The team's final event of the season was the 2023 World Women's Curling Championship. After eight games, they sat tied for third in the standings with a good chance of making the playoffs. However, they lost their final four round robin games, falling to tenth place with a 5–7 record.

Following the 2022–23 season, she, along with her sister, retired from competitive curling.

== Personal life ==
Jentsch is employed as a soldier athlete. Her sister, Daniela Jentsch is the skip of her team. Their parents are also well-known German curlers. Their father, Roland Jentsch was the European men's champion in 1991 and their mother Christiane Jentsch won the gold medal at the 1992 Winter Olympics when curling was a demonstration sport.

== Teams ==
Season	Skip	Third	Second	Lead	Alternate
2012–13	Daniela Jentsch	Martina Linder	Marika Trettin	Analena Jentsch	
2013–14	Daniela Jentsch	Martina Linder	Marika Trettin	Analena Jentsch	
2014–15	Daniela Jentsch	Analena Jentsch	Stella Heiß	Pia-Lisa Schöll	Marika Trettin
2015–16	Daniela Jentsch	Analena Jentsch	Marika Trettin	Pia-Lisa Schöll	Maike Beer
2016–17	Daniela Jentsch	Analena Jentsch	Josephine Obermann	Pia-Lisa Schöll	Emira Abbes
2017–18	Daniela Jentsch	Josephine Obermann	Analena Jentsch	Pia-Lisa Schöll	Emira Abbes
2018–19	Daniela Jentsch	Emira Abbes	Analena Jentsch	Klara-Hermine Fomm	Mia Höhne
2019–20	Daniela Jentsch	Emira Abbes	Klara-Hermine Fomm	Analena Jentsch	Mia Höhne
2020–21	Daniela Jentsch	Emira Abbes	Alina Androsova-Kaulfersch	Analena Jentsch	Pia-Lisa Schöll
2020–21	Daniela Jentsch	Mia Höhne	Klara-Hermine Fomm	Analena Jentsch	Emira Abbes
2021–22	Daniela Jentsch	Emira Abbes	Mia Höhne	Analena Jentsch	Klara-Hermine Fomm
2022–23	Daniela Jentsch	Emira Abbes	Mia Höhne	Analena Jentsch	
2022–23	Daniela Jentsch	Emira Abbes	Lena Kapp	Analena Jentsch	Pia-Lisa Schöll
