= Emira Abbes =

German curler (born 1996)

- Curler
- Born: Emira Abbes; 6 September 1996 (age 30); Füssen, Germany

Team
- Curling club: CC Füssen; Füssen, GER
- Skip: Sara Messenzehl
- Fourth: Kim Sutor
- Third: Emira Abbes
- Second: Zoé Antes
- Alternate: Joy Sutor
- Mixed doubles partner: Klaudius Harsch

Curling career
- Member Association: Germany
- World Championship: 5 (2017, 2018, 2019, 2022, 2023)
- European Championship: 7 (2017, 2018, 2019, 2021, 2022, 2023, 2025)
Medal record
Women's curling
Representing Germany
European Curling Championships
Bronze medal – third place	2018 Tallinn
Bronze medal – third place	2021 Lillehammer

Emira Abbes (born 6 September 1996) is a German curler from Füssen. She currently is the third the German National Women's Curling Team. She also previously played third on the two-time European Bronze German team led by Daniela Jentsch.

== Career ==
Abbes was a member of the German team at the 2017 Winter Universiade, playing second on a team skipped by Maike Beer. The team finished in eighth.

Abbes became the alternate on the German national women's team (skipped by Daniela Jentsch) in 2017. As the team's alternate, she played in the 2017 World Women's Curling Championship. The team was sitting at 5–4 with two games left. The Germans had a chance to qualify for the playoffs. Unfortunately, they would lose their last two games to Scotland and Czech Republic, ending their chance to reach the playoffs. That season, the German team was met with disappointment. They tried to qualify for the Olympic Games, at the 2018 Winter Olympic qualification event, but they finished with a record of 2–4, missing the playoffs.

The next season, the team qualified for the Worlds after going 3–6 at the Euros. But the team struggled at the World Championship, finishing in twelfth with a 3–9 record. The following season, the German team would have success at the Europeans. The team reached the playoffs at Abbes first European Curling Championships with a 5–4 record. In the semifinal, they lost to the Swiss team Silvana Tirinzoni 6–4. In the bronze medal game though, the Germans turned things around. The team would win the game 7–4, winning them the bronze medal. It was her first medal at an international competition. Abbes also won her second tour event this season. Two months after the Europeans, the team won the Qinghai Curling Elite. At the Worlds, her team of Daniela Jentsch, Klara-Hermine Fomm and Analena Jentsch were sitting at 4–6 after their tenth game with two still to go. The team had another chance to clinch a playoff spot. But once again they lost their next game eliminating them from contention. The team did have a good final game though, beating eventual winners Switzerland 10–8 after scoring four in the last end.

Team Jentsch's first event of the 2019–20 season was at the 2019 Cargill Curling Training Centre Icebreaker where they lost in the quarterfinals. They also had playoff appearances at the 2019 Cameron's Brewing Oakville Fall Classic and the Prestige Hotels & Resorts Curling Classic making the semifinals in both events. The German team also qualified for their first Grand Slam of Curling event, the 2019 Tour Challenge Tier 2 where they went 1–3, missing the playoffs. At the 2019 European Curling Championships, the team did not qualify for the playoffs like in 2018, finishing the round-robin in fifth place with a 5–4 record. The team was set to represent Germany at the 2020 World Women's Curling Championship before the event got cancelled due to the COVID-19 pandemic.

Team Jentsch represented Germany at the 2021 World Women's Curling Championship, which was played in a bio-secure bubble in Calgary, Canada due the ongoing pandemic. Abbes travelled with the team to Calgary, but tested positive for COVID-19 upon her arrival, along with teammate Klara-Hermine Fomm. The two could not play with rest of the team (which played with just three players), and had to be isolated in their hotel rooms. At the Worlds, the German threesome finished in ninth place with a 6–7 record.

The 2021–22 season began for Team Jentsch at the 2021 Euro Super Series where they reached the semifinal round before losing to Rebecca Morrison. They also reached the semifinals of the 2021 Sherwood Park Women's Curling Classic where they were eliminated by Kerri Einarson. In October, the team won the Alberta Curling Series: Thistle tour event, defeating Kayla Skrlik in the final. At the 2021 European Curling Championships, Team Jentsch finished the round robin with a 6–3 record, qualifying for the playoffs again as the fourth seed. They then lost to Scotland's Eve Muirhead in the semifinal, however, were able to rebound to secure the bronze medal, once again defeating Russia's Alina Kovaleva rink in the bronze medal game. The team's next event was the 2021 Olympic Qualification Event, where they attempted to qualify for the 2022 Winter Olympics. After a slow start, they could not rebound in time to reach the qualification round, finishing in sixth place with a 3–5 record. In January, they competed in back-to-back tour events in Switzerland, reaching the semifinals of the St. Galler Elite Challenge and the final of the International Bernese Ladies Cup where they lost to Raphaela Keiser. Next for the team was the 2022 World Women's Curling Championship where they finished in ninth place with a 5–7 record. Because of their successful tour season, Team Jentsch had enough points to qualify for the year-end 2022 Players' Championship, their first top tier Grand Slam event. There, they finished with 2–3 record, just missing the playoff round.

Team Jentsch began the 2022–23 season at the 2022 Euro Super Series where they defeated Maia Ramsfjell, skipping Team Marianne Rørvik, 5–3 in the championship game. In the fall, the team played in two Grand Slam events, the 2022 National and the 2022 Tour Challenge, failing to qualify at both. Unlike 2021, the team could not qualify for the playoffs at the 2022 European Curling Championships, finishing seventh overall with a 5–4 record. After failing to reach the playoffs in seven straight events, Team Jentsch turned things around in the new year. They won back-to-back titles at the 2023 New Year Medalist Curling and the 2023 Mercure Perth Masters after going on a twelve-game win streak. They also had quarterfinal appearances at the St. Galler Elite Challenge and the 2023 International Bernese Ladies Cup. The team's final event of the season was the 2023 World Women's Curling Championship. After eight games, they sat tied for third in the standings with a good chance of making the playoffs. Unfortunately, however, they lost their final four round robin games, falling to tenth place with a 5–7 record.

Following the 2022–23 season, both Daniela and Analena Jentsch retired from competitive curling. Abbes then took over as skip of the German team with a new lineup of Lena Kapp, Mia Höhne and Maike Beer. The team would represent Germany at the 2023 European Curling Championships, however would finish the round robin in 10th place, with a 2–7 record. After taking two years off, Abbes would return to represent Germany in the 2025–26 curling season and play third for the new Sara Messenzehl rink, with the goal of qualifying for the 2026 Winter Olympics. The Messenzehl rink would finish in second place at the 2025 Pre-Olympic Qualification Event, qualifying for the 2025 Olympic Qualification Event.

== Personal life ==
As of 2020, Abbes is employed as a sports soldier.
