= Daniela Jentsch =

German curler

- Curler
- Other names: Daniela Driendl
- Born: Daniela Jentsch; 15 January 1982 (age 44); Füssen, West Germany (now Germany)

Team
- Curling club: CC Füssen; Füssen, GER

Curling career
- Member Association: Germany
- World Championship: 9 (2000, 2015, 2016, 2017, 2018, 2019, 2021, 2022, 2023)
- European Championship: 9 (2002, 2004, 2015, 2016, 2017, 2018, 2019, 2021, 2022)
Medal record
Women's Curling
Representing Germany
European Curling Championships
Bronze medal – third place	2018 Tallinn
Bronze medal – third place	2021 Lillehammer

Daniela Jentsch (born 15 January 1982), (known as Daniela Driendl from 2011 to 2016), is a retired German curler from Füssen. She was the skip of the German National Women's Curling Team.

== Career ==
Jentsch played in her first international competition in 1997 at the 1997 World Junior Curling Championships, as third for Natalie Nessler. There, the team finished in eighth place with a 2–7 record. She has skipped the German women's junior team to two "B" level gold medals in 2001 and 2002. At the "A" level, she finished tenth in 2001 and fifth in 2002, just missing the playoffs.

When she was just 18, Jentsch participated in her first World Women's Curling Championship at the 2000 Ford World Women's Curling Championship in Glasgow, Scotland, playing third for Petra Tschetsch. There, the team finished the round robin with a 4–5 record, missing the playoffs. Her first European Curling Championships was in 2002 at the 2002 European Curling Championships. There, Jentsch skipped the German team to a 5–4 round robin record, just missing the playoffs. She returned to the Euros two years later at the 2004 European Curling Championships but finished in ninth place with a 3–6 record. Jentsch played third for her father at the 2006 European Mixed Curling Championships where they finished tenth.

Jentsch did not return to any international competitions for nine years before playing in the 2015 World Women's Curling Championship. Her team did not play in the European Championships that season, the Andrea Schöpp rink did. But Jentsch's rink were the ones that represented Germany at the Worlds. Her team of Analena Jentsch, Stella Heiß and Pia-Lisa Schöll beat top teams Sweden and United States before losing their last five games to finish with a record of 4–7. Jentsch did play in the 2015 European Curling Championships as skip for the German team. The team missed the playoffs with a 4–5 record but did qualify their country for the 2016 World Championship. The team struggled during the week, finishing the round robin in 10th place with a 3–8 record. The next season, Jentsch would win her first World Curling Tour event, the Latvia International Challenger. At the 2016 Euros, the German team finished 4–5 again which was once again enough to qualify for the 2017 Worlds. The team would have their best World Championship so far. Sitting at 5–4 with two games left, the Germans had a chance to qualify for the playoffs. They then lost their last two games to Scotland and Czech Republic, ending their chance of reaching the playoffs. That season, the German team was met with disappointment. They tried to qualify for the Olympic Games, at the 2018 Winter Olympic qualification event, but they finished with a record of 2–4, missing the playoffs.

The next season, the team once again qualified for the Worlds after going 3–6 at the Euros. But like in 2016, the team struggled at the World Championship, finishing in twelfth with a 3–9 record. The following season, the German team would have success at the Europeans. Jentsch reached the playoffs for the first time in her career with a 5–4 record. In the semifinal, Jentsch curled 67% which would not be good enough to beat the Swiss team as they lost 6–4. In the bronze medal game though, the Germans turned things around. Jentsch curled a high 87% game en route to winning the bronze medal against Russia's Alina Kovaleva. It was her first medal at an international competition. Jentsch also won her second tour event this season. Two months after the Europeans, the team won the Qinghai Curling Elite. At the Worlds, her team of Emira Abbes, Klara-Hermine Fomm and Analena Jentsch were sitting at 4–6 after their tenth game with two still to go. The team had another chance to clinch a playoff spot. But once again they lost their next game eliminating them from contention. The team did have a good final game though, beating eventual winners Switzerland 10–8 after scoring four in the last end.

Team Jentsch's first event of the 2019–20 season was at the 2019 Cargill Curling Training Centre Icebreaker where they lost in the quarterfinals. They also had playoff appearances at the 2019 Cameron's Brewing Oakville Fall Classic and the Prestige Hotels & Resorts Curling Classic making the semifinals in both events. The German team also qualified for their first Grand Slam of Curling event, the 2019 Tour Challenge Tier 2 where they went 1–3, missing the playoffs. At the 2019 European Curling Championships, the team did not qualify for the playoffs like in 2018, finishing the round-robin in fifth place with a 5–4 record. The team was set to represent Germany at the 2020 World Women's Curling Championship before the event got cancelled due to the COVID-19 pandemic.

Team Jentsch represented Germany at the 2021 World Women's Curling Championship, which was played in a bio-secure bubble in Calgary, Canada, due the ongoing pandemic. The team had to play with just three players as second Klara-Hermine Fomm and alternate Emira Abbes tested positive for COVID-19 upon their arrival, and had to be quarantined. At the Worlds, Jentsch led her threesome to a 6–7 record, finishing in ninth place.

The 2021–22 season began for Team Jentsch at the 2021 Euro Super Series where they reached the semifinal round before losing to Rebecca Morrison. They also reached the semifinals of the 2021 Sherwood Park Women's Curling Classic where they were eliminated by Kerri Einarson. In October, the team won the Alberta Curling Series: Thistle tour event, defeating Kayla Skrlik in the final. At the 2021 European Curling Championships, Team Jentsch finished the round robin with a 6–3 record, qualifying for the playoffs again as the fourth seed. They then lost to Scotland's Eve Muirhead in the semifinal, however, were able to rebound to secure the bronze medal, once again defeating Russia's Alina Kovaleva rink in the bronze medal game. The team's next event was the 2021 Olympic Qualification Event, where they attempted to qualify for the 2022 Winter Olympics. After a slow start, they could not rebound in time to reach the qualification round, finishing in sixth place with a 3–5 record. In January, they competed in back-to-back tour events in Switzerland, reaching the semifinals of the St. Galler Elite Challenge and the final of the International Bernese Ladies Cup where they lost to Raphaela Keiser. Next for the team was the 2022 World Women's Curling Championship where they finished in ninth place with a 5–7 record. Because of their successful tour season, Team Jentsch had enough points to qualify for the year-end 2022 Players' Championship, their first top tier Grand Slam event. There, they finished with 2–3 record, just missing the playoff round.

Team Jentsch began the 2022–23 season at the 2022 Euro Super Series where they defeated Maia Ramsfjell, skipping Team Marianne Rørvik, 5–3 in the championship game. In the fall, the team played in two Grand Slam events, the 2022 National and the 2022 Tour Challenge, failing to qualify at both. Unlike 2021, the team could not qualify for the playoffs at the 2022 European Curling Championships, finishing seventh overall with a 5–4 record. After failing to reach the playoffs in seven straight events, Team Jentsch turned things around in the new year. They won back-to-back titles at the 2023 New Year Medalist Curling and the 2023 Mercure Perth Masters after going on a twelve-game win streak. They also had quarterfinal appearances at the St. Galler Elite Challenge and the 2023 International Bernese Ladies Cup. The team's final event of the season was the 2023 World Women's Curling Championship. After eight games, they sat tied for third in the standings with a good chance of making the playoffs. However, they lost their final four round robin games, falling to tenth place with a 5–7 record.

Following the 2022–23 season, Jentsch retired from competitive curling.

== Personal life ==
Jentsch played volleyball and tennis before taking up curling. Before qualifying for the 1997 World Junior Curling Championships, she was never very interested in the sport.

Jentsch is employed as a soldier athlete. She has two children, and is formerly married to ice hockey player Andreas Driendl. Her sister, Analena Jentsch is the lead on her team. Their parents are also well-known German curlers. Their father, Roland Jentsch was the European men's champion in 1991 and their mother Christiane Jentsch won the gold medal at the 1992 Winter Olympics when curling was a demonstration sport. Daniela posed nude in the 2006 Ana Arce Team sponsorship calendar along with curlers Melanie Robillard, Lynsay Ryan, Kasia Selwand and Claudia Toth.

== Grand Slam record ==
Key
C	Champion
F	Lost in Final
SF	Lost in Semifinal
QF	Lost in Quarterfinals
R16	Lost in the round of 16
Q	Did not advance to playoffs
T2	Played in Tier 2 event
DNP	Did not participate in event
N/A	Not a Grand Slam event that season

Event	2019–20	2020–21	2021–22	2022–23
The National	DNP	N/A	DNP	Q
Tour Challenge	T2	N/A	N/A	Q
Players'	N/A	DNP	Q	DNP
