= St. Galler Elite Challenge =

World Curling Tour event

- Established: 2022
- Host city: St. Gallen, Switzerland
- Arena: Curling Center St. Gallen
- Men's purse: CHF 6,200
- Women's purse: CHF 6,000

Current champions (2026)
- Men: (Switzerland) Michael Brunner
- Women: (Switzerland) Elodie Jerger

The St. Galler Elite Challenge is an annual tournament on the men's and women's World Curling Tour. It is held annually in January at Curling Center St. Gallen in St. Gallen, Switzerland.

The purse for the event is CHF 7,000 for the men's event and CHF 6,600 for the women's event. Its event classification is 100.

The event has been held since 2022. The 2023 event consisted of 27 teams from 10 countries.

St. Gallen previously hosted the Euronics European Masters World Curling Tour event, last held in 2017.

== Men's champions ==
Year	Winning team	Runner up team	Purse (CHF)	Winner's share (CDN)
2022	(Switzerland) Marco Hösli, Philipp Hösli, Justin Hausherr, Marco Hefti	(Switzerland) Yannick Schwaller, Michael Brunner, Romano Meier, Marcel Käufeler	7,000	$2,761
2023	(Scotland) Cameron Bryce, David Baird, Mark Taylor, Robin McCall	(Switzerland) Anthony Petoud, Michael Brunner (skip), Romano Meier, Marcel Käufeler	7,000	$5,856
2024	(Scotland) Cameron Bryce, Duncan Menzies, Luke Carson, Robin McCall	(Scotland) Kyle Waddell, Craig Waddell, Mark Taylor, Gavin Barr	6,200	$3,000
2026	(Switzerland) Michael Brunner, Anthony Petoud, Romano Keller-Meier, Andreas Gerlach	(Switzerland) Manuel Jermann, Yannick Jermann, Timon Biehle, Jan Tanner	6,000	

== Women's champions ==
Year	Winning team	Runner up team	Purse (CHF)	Winner's share (CDN)
2022	(Switzerland) Ladina Müller, Nora Wüst (skip), Anna Stern, Karin Winter	(Switzerland) Irene Schori, Celine Schwizgebel, Stefanie Berset, Lara Stocker	4,600	$2,761
2023	(Switzerland) Xenia Schwaller, Fabienne Rieder, Marion Wüest, Selina Gafner	(Scotland) Rebecca Morrison, Gina Aitken, Sophie Sinclair, Sophie Jackson	6,600	$5,856
2024	(Germany) Emira Abbes (Fourth), Mia Höhne (Skip), Lena Kapp, Maike Beer	(Switzerland) Isabel Einspieler, Alissa Rudolf, Jana Hahlen, Renée Frigo	4,600	$2,000
2026	(Switzerland) Jana Hoffmann, Jana-Tamara Hählen, Renée Frigo, Elodie Jerger (skip)	(Switzerland) Sophie Jeinimann, Elina Arnold, Lucia Nebbia, Julia Suter	$6,000	$2,000
