= 2015 Canad Inns Women's Classic =

World Curling Tour event

- Host city: Portage la Prairie, Manitoba
- Arena: Portage Curling Club
- Dates: October 22–25
- Winner: (South Korea) Team Kim
- Curling club: Uiseong CC, Uiseong
- Skip: Kim Eun-jung
- Third: Kim Kyeong-ae
- Second: Kim Seon-yeong
- Lead: Kim Yeong-mi
- Alternate: Kim Cho-hi
- Finalist: (Manitoba) Jennifer Jones

The 2015 Canad Inns Women's Classic was held from October 22 to 25 at the Portage Curling Club in Portage la Prairie, Manitoba as part of the World Curling Tour. The event was held in a triple-knockout format with a purse of $60,000.

In the final, 2018 Olympic silver medallist Kim Eun-jung of South Korea defeated 2014 Olympic gold medallist Jennifer Jones team from Manitoba to win the event. Kim took home the $15,400 winners purse while Jones settled for $10,400.

== Teams ==
The teams are listed as follows:

Skip	Third	Second	Lead	Locale
Sherry Anderson	Jessica Hanson	Elyse Lafrance	Brie Spilchen	Delisle, Saskatchewan
Erika Brown	Allison Pottinger	Nicole Joraanstad	Natalie Nicholson	Madison, United States
Alex Carlson	Rebecca Funk	Jordan Moulton	Kendall Behm	Saint Paul, United States
Kristie Moore (Note: Kristie Moore spared for Chantelle Eberle.)	Cindy Ricci	Larisa Murray	Debbie Lozinski	Regina, Saskatchewan
Kerri Einarson	Selena Kaatz	Liz Fyfe	Kristin MacCuish	Winnipeg, Manitoba
Michelle Englot	Candace Chisholm	Stephanie Schmidt	Brooklyn Lemon	Regina, Saskatchewan
Tracy Fleury	Jenn Horgan	Jenna Walsh	Amanda Gates	Sudbury, Ontario
Jennifer Jones	Kaitlyn Lawes	Jill Officer	Dawn McEwen	Winnipeg, Manitoba
Kim Eun-jung	Kim Kyeong-ae	Kim Seon-yeong	Kim Yeong-mi	Uiseong, South Korea
Junko Nishimuro (Fourth)	Misato Yanagisawa	Tori Koana (Skip)	Riko Toyoda	Yamanashi, Japan
Stefanie Lawton	Trish Paulsen	Sherri Singler	Marliese Kasner	Saskatoon, Saskatchewan
Krista McCarville	Kendra Lilly	Ashley Sippala	Sarah Potts	Thunder Bay, Ontario
Kristy McDonald	Kate Cameron	Leslie Wilson-Westcott	Raunora Westcott	Winnipeg, Manitoba
Tiffany McLean	Heather Bruederlin	Cassandra Lesiuk	Blaire Rempel	Winnipeg, Manitoba
Michelle Montford	Lisa DeRiviere	Sara Van Walleghem	Sarah Neufeld	Winnipeg, Manitoba
Cissi Östlund	Sabrina Kraupp	Sara Carlsson	Paulina Stein	Karlstad, Sweden
Cathy Overton-Clapham	Briane Meilleur	Katherine Doerksen	Krysten Karwacki	Winnipeg, Manitoba
Jacki Rintoul	Dawn Moxham	Tammy Davey	Betty Weir	Portage la Prairie, Manitoba
Darcy Robertson	Karen Klein	Vanessa Foster	Michelle Kruk	Winnipeg, Manitoba
Nina Roth	Aileen Sormunen	Monica Walker	Vicky Persinger	Blaine, United States
Kelly Scott	Shannon Aleksic	Jenna Loder	Sarah Pyke	Kelowna, British Columbia
Maria Prytz (Fourth)	Christina Bertrup	Maria Wennerström	Margaretha Sigfridsson (Skip)	Sundsvall, Sweden
Jamie Sinclair	Tabitha Peterson	Becca Hamilton	Jenna Haag	Blaine, United States
Barb Spencer	Katie Spencer	Holly Spencer	Allyson Spencer	Sanford, Manitoba
Elena Stern	Anna Stern	Noëlle Iseli	Tanja Schwegler	Wetzikon, Switzerland
Jill Thurston	Brette Richards	Kristen Foster	Blaine de Jager	Winnipeg, Manitoba

== Knockout brackets ==
=== A event ===
First Knockout
(Saskatchewan) Sherry Anderson	3
(Manitoba) Darcy Robertson	7
(Sweden) Cissi Östlund	4
(Manitoba) Cathy Overton-Clapham	7
(United States) Erika Brown	4
(Manitoba) Barb Spencer	5
(Japan) Tori Koana	3
(United States) Jamie Sinclair	9
(Saskatchewan) Michelle Englot	9
(Manitoba) Michelle Montford	2

Quarterfinals
(Manitoba) Jennifer Jones	7
(Manitoba) Darcy Robertson	3
(Manitoba) Cathy Overton-Clapham	6
(Manitoba) Barb Spencer	7
(Saskatchewan) Team Eberle	6
(United States) Jamie Sinclair	5
(Saskatchewan) Michelle Englot	7
(Manitoba) Kristy McDonald	3

Semifinals
(Manitoba) Jennifer Jones	8
(Manitoba) Barb Spencer	0
(Saskatchewan) Team Eberle	6
(Saskatchewan) Michelle Englot	8

Qualifier 1
(Manitoba) Jennifer Jones	6
(Saskatchewan) Michelle Englot	7

First Knockout
(Saskatchewan) Stefanie Lawton	7
(Manitoba) Jill Thurston	4
(Manitoba) Tiffany McLean	6
(Manitoba) Jacki Rintoul	2
(United States) Nina Roth	2
(Manitoba) Kerri Einarson	7
(Switzerland) Elena Stern	2
(Sweden) Margaretha Sigfridsson	11
(Ontario) Krista McCarville	3
(United States) Alex Carlson	8

Quarterfinals
(South Korea) Kim Eun-jung	7
(Saskatchewan) Stefanie Lawton	6
(Manitoba) Tiffany McLean	1
(Manitoba) Kerri Einarson	9
(British Columbia) Kelly Scott	9
(Sweden) Margaretha Sigfridsson	3
(Ontario) Tracy Fleury	7
(United States) Alex Carlson	4

Semifinals
(South Korea) Kim Eun-jung	7
(Manitoba) Kerri Einarson	5
(British Columbia) Kelly Scott	5
(Ontario) Tracy Fleury	6

Qualifier 2
(South Korea) Kim Eun-jung	3
(Ontario) Tracy Fleury	5

=== B event ===
Second Knockout
(Sweden) Cissi Östlund	2
(United States) Erika Brown	8

Round of 16
(Saskatchewan) Sherry Anderson	5
(United States) Erika Brown	6
(Japan) Tori Koana	9
(Manitoba) Michelle Montford	5
(Saskatchewan) Stefanie Lawton	9
(Manitoba) Tiffany McLean	2
(Sweden) Margaretha Sigfridsson	9
(United States) Alex Carlson	0

Quarterfinals
(United States) Erika Brown	4
(Manitoba) Kerri Einarson	10
(Japan) Tori Koana	5
(British Columbia) Kelly Scott	9
(Saskatchewan) Stefanie Lawton	7
(Sweden) Margaretha Sigfridsson	6

Semifinals
(Manitoba) Kerri Einarson	6
(British Columbia) Kelly Scott	5
(Saskatchewan) Stefanie Lawton	4
(Manitoba) Jennifer Jones	9

Qualifier 3
(Manitoba) Kerri Einarson	3
(Manitoba) Jennifer Jones	6

Second Knockout
(Manitoba) Jacki Rintoul	4
(United States) Nina Roth	10

Round of 16
(Manitoba) Darcy Robertson	5
(Manitoba) Cathy Overton-Clapham	4
(United States) Jamie Sinclair	5
(Manitoba) Kristy McDonald	6
(Manitoba) Jill Thurston	6
(United States) Nina Roth	8
(Switzerland) Elena Stern	7
(Ontario) Krista McCarville	5

Quarterfinals
(Manitoba) Darcy Robertson	7
(Manitoba) Kristy McDonald	8
(Manitoba) Barb Spencer	3
(United States) Nina Roth	4
(Saskatchewan) Team Eberle	7
(Switzerland) Elena Stern	3

Semifinals
(Manitoba) Kristy McDonald	2
(South Korea) Kim Eun-jung	7
(United States) Nina Roth	6
(Saskatchewan) Team Eberle	3

Qualifier 4
(South Korea) Kim Eun-jung	8
(United States) Nina Roth	1

=== C event ===
Third Knockout		Semifinals		Qualifier 5
(Manitoba) Darcy Robertson	3
(Manitoba) Michelle Montford	6	(Manitoba) Michelle Montford	7
(Manitoba) Barb Spencer	5	(Manitoba) Barb Spencer	9
(Switzerland) Elena Stern	2			(Manitoba) Barb Spencer	6
				(Manitoba) Kerri Einarson	7

Third Knockout
(Saskatchewan) Sherry Anderson	9
(Manitoba) Tiffany McLean	1
(United States) Alex Carlson	2
(Sweden) Cissi Östlund	10

Semifinals
(Saskatchewan) Sherry Anderson	2
(Manitoba) Kristy McDonald	5
(Sweden) Cissi Östlund	6
(Saskatchewan) Team Eberle	5

Qualifier 6
(Manitoba) Kristy McDonald	6
(Sweden) Cissi Östlund	4

Third Knockout
(Manitoba) Cathy Overton-Clapham	8
(Manitoba) Jill Thurston	1
(United States) Jamie Sinclair	8
(Manitoba) Jacki Rintoul	0

Semifinals
(Manitoba) Cathy Overton-Clapham	7
(British Columbia) Kelly Scott	4
(United States) Jamie Sinclair	2
(Saskatchewan) Stefanie Lawton	7

Qualifier 7
(Manitoba) Cathy Overton-Clapham	5
(Saskatchewan) Stefanie Lawton	6

Third Knockout		Semifinals		Qualifier 8
(United States) Erika Brown	8
(Japan) Tori Koana	4	(United States) Erika Brown	5
(Sweden) Margaretha Sigfridsson	7	(Sweden) Margaretha Sigfridsson	3
(Ontario) Krista McCarville	5			(United States) Erika Brown	7
				(United States) Nina Roth	3

== Knockout results ==
All draw times listed in Central Time (UTC−06:00).

=== Draw 1 ===
Thursday, October 22, 1:30 pm

Team	1	2	3	4	5	6	7	8	Final
(Saskatchewan) Sherry Anderson 🔨	1	0	0	0	2	0	0	X	3
(Manitoba) Darcy Robertson	0	1	3	1	0	1	1	X	7

Team	1	2	3	4	5	6	7	8	Final
(Sweden) Cissi Östlund	0	0	1	0	0	2	1	X	4
(Manitoba) Cathy Overton-Clapham 🔨	3	1	0	1	2	0	0	X	7

Team	1	2	3	4	5	6	7	8	Final
(United States) Erika Brown	1	0	0	1	1	0	1	0	4
(Manitoba) Barb Spencer 🔨	0	1	1	0	0	2	0	1	5

Team	1	2	3	4	5	6	7	8	Final
(Japan) Tori Koana 🔨	1	0	0	0	0	2	0	X	3
(United States) Jamie Sinclair	0	0	3	3	2	0	1	X	9

Team	1	2	3	4	5	6	7	8	Final
(Saskatchewan) Michelle Englot 🔨	2	0	5	0	2	X	X	X	9
(Manitoba) Michelle Montford	0	1	0	1	0	X	X	X	2

Team	1	2	3	4	5	6	7	8	Final
(Saskatchewan) Stefanie Lawton	0	1	0	2	0	3	1	X	7
(Manitoba) Jill Thurston 🔨	1	0	2	0	1	0	0	X	4

Team	1	2	3	4	5	6	7	8	Final
(Manitoba) Tiffany McLean	0	1	1	1	0	2	1	X	6
(Manitoba) Jacki Rintoul	1	0	0	0	1	0	0	X	2

Team	1	2	3	4	5	6	7	8	Final
(United States) Nina Roth 🔨	1	0	0	0	1	0	0	X	2
(Manitoba) Kerri Einarson	0	1	0	2	0	2	2	X	7

=== Draw 2 ===
Thursday, October 22, 5:00 pm

Team	1	2	3	4	5	6	7	8	Final
(Switzerland) Elena Stern	0	0	2	0	0	X	X	X	2
(Sweden) Margaretha Sigfridsson 🔨	0	2	0	5	4	X	X	X	11

Team	1	2	3	4	5	6	7	8	Final
(Ontario) Krista McCarville	0	1	0	2	0	0	0	X	3
(United States) Alex Carlson 🔨	3	0	1	0	2	1	1	X	8

=== Draw 3 ===
Thursday, October 22, 8:30 pm

Team	1	2	3	4	5	6	7	8	Final
(Manitoba) Jennifer Jones 🔨	2	1	0	1	2	0	1	X	7
(Manitoba) Darcy Robertson	0	0	2	0	0	1	0	X	3

Team	1	2	3	4	5	6	7	8	Final
(Manitoba) Cathy Overton-Clapham 🔨	1	0	2	0	1	0	2	0	6
(Manitoba) Barb Spencer	0	1	0	2	0	3	0	1	7

Team	1	2	3	4	5	6	7	8	9	Final
(Saskatchewan) Team Eberle 🔨	0	2	0	1	0	1	1	0	1	6
(United States) Jamie Sinclair	0	0	2	0	2	0	0	1	0	5

Team	1	2	3	4	5	6	7	8	Final
(Saskatchewan) Michelle Englot 🔨	1	0	2	1	1	0	2	X	7
(Manitoba) Kristy McDonald	0	1	0	0	0	2	0	X	3

Team	1	2	3	4	5	6	7	8	Final
(South Korea) Kim Eun-jung 🔨	0	1	0	2	0	3	0	1	7
(Saskatchewan) Stefanie Lawton	0	0	2	0	2	0	2	0	6

Team	1	2	3	4	5	6	7	8	Final
(Manitoba) Tiffany McLean	0	1	0	0	X	X	X	X	1
(Manitoba) Kerri Einarson 🔨	5	0	2	2	X	X	X	X	9

Team	1	2	3	4	5	6	7	8	Final
(British Columbia) Kelly Scott	2	0	2	0	2	3	X	X	9
(Sweden) Margaretha Sigfridsson 🔨	0	1	0	2	0	0	X	X	3

Team	1	2	3	4	5	6	7	8	Final
(Ontario) Tracy Fleury 🔨	0	3	0	2	0	2	0	X	7
(United States) Alex Carlson	1	0	1	0	1	0	1	X	4

=== Draw 4 ===
Friday, October 23, 10:00 am

Team	1	2	3	4	5	6	7	8	Final
(Sweden) Cissi Östlund 🔨	0	2	0	0	0	0	0	X	2
(United States) Erika Brown	0	0	1	1	1	4	1	X	8

Team	1	2	3	4	5	6	7	8	Final
(Manitoba) Jacki Rintoul	0	1	2	0	1	0	0	X	4
(United States) Nina Roth 🔨	3	0	0	3	0	1	3	X	10

Team	1	2	3	4	5	6	7	8	Final
(Manitoba) Darcy Robertson 🔨	1	0	0	1	1	0	2	0	5
(Manitoba) Cathy Overton-Clapham	0	1	1	0	0	1	0	1	4

Team	1	2	3	4	5	6	7	8	Final
(United States) Jamie Sinclair 🔨	2	1	0	1	0	0	1	0	5
(Manitoba) Kristy McDonald	0	0	1	0	2	1	0	2	6

Team	1	2	3	4	5	6	7	8	Final
(Japan) Tori Koana	0	3	0	3	2	0	1	X	9
(Manitoba) Michelle Montford 🔨	1	0	3	0	0	1	0	X	5

=== Draw 5 ===
Friday, October 23, 1:30 pm

Team	1	2	3	4	5	6	7	8	Final
(Manitoba) Jennifer Jones 🔨	2	4	1	1	X	X	X	X	8
(Manitoba) Barb Spencer	0	0	0	0	X	X	X	X	0

Team	1	2	3	4	5	6	7	8	Final
(Saskatchewan) Team Eberle 🔨	1	0	1	0	2	0	2	X	6
(Saskatchewan) Michelle Englot	0	3	0	1	0	4	0	X	8

Team	1	2	3	4	5	6	7	8	Final
(South Korea) Kim Eun-jung 🔨	2	0	1	0	2	0	1	1	7
(Manitoba) Kerri Einarson	0	2	0	1	0	2	0	0	5

Team	1	2	3	4	5	6	7	8	Final
(British Columbia) Kelly Scott 🔨	0	3	0	0	1	0	1	0	5
(Ontario) Tracy Fleury	0	0	1	1	0	2	0	2	6

Team	1	2	3	4	5	6	7	8	Final
(Saskatchewan) Stefanie Lawton	0	3	0	0	3	3	X	X	9
(Manitoba) Tiffany McLean 🔨	1	0	0	1	0	0	X	X	2

Team	1	2	3	4	5	6	7	8	Final
(Sweden) Margaretha Sigfridsson	1	1	4	3	X	X	X	X	9
(United States) Alex Carlson 🔨	0	0	0	0	X	X	X	X	0

=== Draw 6 ===
Friday, October 23, 5:00 pm

Team	1	2	3	4	5	6	7	8	Final
(Saskatchewan) Sherry Anderson 🔨	0	0	1	0	1	0	2	1	5
(United States) Erika Brown	0	3	0	1	0	2	0	0	6

Team	1	2	3	4	5	6	7	8	Final
(Manitoba) Jill Thurston	2	0	2	0	2	0	0	0	6
(United States) Nina Roth 🔨	0	1	0	1	0	2	2	2	8

Team	1	2	3	4	5	6	7	8	Final
(Switzerland) Elena Stern 🔨	2	0	1	0	0	1	0	3	7
(Ontario) Krista McCarville	0	3	0	0	1	0	1	0	5

Team	1	2	3	4	5	6	7	8	Final
(Japan) Tori Koana	0	2	0	0	2	0	1	X	5
(British Columbia) Kelly Scott 🔨	3	0	1	1	0	4	0	X	9

Team	1	2	3	4	5	6	7	8	Final
(Manitoba) Darcy Robertson 🔨	2	0	4	0	0	0	0	1	7
(Manitoba) Kristy McDonald	0	1	0	1	2	1	3	0	8

=== Draw 7 ===
Friday, October 23, 8:30 pm

Team	1	2	3	4	5	6	7	8	Final
(Manitoba) Jennifer Jones 🔨	2	0	1	2	0	1	0	0	6
(Saskatchewan) Michelle Englot	0	2	0	0	2	0	2	1	7

Team	1	2	3	4	5	6	7	8	Final
(South Korea) Kim Eun-jung	0	1	0	1	0	0	1	X	3
(Ontario) Tracy Fleury 🔨	0	0	3	0	1	1	0	X	5

Team	1	2	3	4	5	6	7	8	Final
(United States) Erika Brown 🔨	2	0	0	2	0	0	X	X	4
(Manitoba) Kerri Einarson	0	1	1	0	6	2	X	X	10

Team	1	2	3	4	5	6	7	8	Final
(Saskatchewan) Stefanie Lawton 🔨	1	0	2	0	0	1	0	3	7
(Sweden) Margaretha Sigfridsson	0	1	0	0	4	0	1	0	6

Team	1	2	3	4	5	6	7	8	Final
(Manitoba) Barb Spencer 🔨	1	0	0	1	0	1	0	0	3
(United States) Nina Roth	0	1	1	0	0	0	1	1	4

Team	1	2	3	4	5	6	7	8	Final
(Saskatchewan) Team Eberle	0	1	0	0	2	2	2	X	7
(Switzerland) Elena Stern 🔨	1	0	1	1	0	0	0	X	3

=== Draw 8 ===
Saturday, October 24, 10:00 am

Team	1	2	3	4	5	6	7	8	Final
(Manitoba) Darcy Robertson 🔨	1	0	0	0	0	1	1	X	3
(Manitoba) Michelle Montford	0	1	2	2	1	0	0	X	6

Team	1	2	3	4	5	6	7	8	Final
(Manitoba) Barb Spencer	1	1	0	1	0	2	0	X	5
(Switzerland) Elena Stern 🔨	0	0	1	0	1	0	0	X	2

Team	1	2	3	4	5	6	7	8	Final
(Saskatchewan) Sherry Anderson	1	0	3	0	3	2	X	X	9
(Manitoba) Tiffany McLean 🔨	0	1	0	0	0	0	X	X	1

Team	1	2	3	4	5	6	7	8	Final
(United States) Alex Carlson	0	0	1	0	1	0	X	X	2
(Sweden) Cissi Östlund 🔨	2	4	0	3	0	1	X	X	10

Team	1	2	3	4	5	6	7	8	Final
(Manitoba) Cathy Overton-Clapham	1	0	2	2	3	X	X	X	8
(Manitoba) Jill Thurston 🔨	0	1	0	0	0	X	X	X	1

Team	1	2	3	4	5	6	7	8	Final
(United States) Jamie Sinclair 🔨	3	1	1	3	X	X	X	X	8
(Manitoba) Jacki Rintoul	0	0	0	0	X	X	X	X	0

Team	1	2	3	4	5	6	7	8	Final
(United States) Erika Brown 🔨	1	0	2	0	2	0	3	X	8
(Japan) Tori Koana	0	1	0	2	0	1	0	X	4

Team	1	2	3	4	5	6	7	8	Final
(Sweden) Margaretha Sigfridsson 🔨	0	2	0	2	0	2	0	1	7
(Ontario) Krista McCarville	0	0	2	0	1	0	2	0	5

=== Draw 9 ===
Saturday, October 24, 1:30 pm

Team	1	2	3	4	5	6	7	8	Final
(Manitoba) Kerri Einarson 🔨	1	0	0	2	0	3	0	0	6
(British Columbia) Kelly Scott	0	1	0	0	1	0	2	1	5

Team	1	2	3	4	5	6	7	8	Final
(Saskatchewan) Stefanie Lawton	1	0	0	2	0	1	0	X	4
(Manitoba) Jennifer Jones 🔨	0	2	0	0	4	0	3	X	9

Team	1	2	3	4	5	6	7	8	Final
(Manitoba) Kristy McDonald	0	0	0	2	0	0	0	X	2
(South Korea) Kim Eun-jung 🔨	0	0	1	0	2	2	2	X	7

Team	1	2	3	4	5	6	7	8	Final
(United States) Nina Roth 🔨	0	2	1	1	0	1	0	1	6
(Saskatchewan) Team Eberle	0	0	0	0	1	0	2	0	3

Team	1	2	3	4	5	6	7	8	9	Final
(Manitoba) Michelle Montford	1	0	2	0	1	0	0	3	0	7
(Manitoba) Barb Spencer 🔨	0	2	0	2	0	2	1	0	2	9

Team	1	2	3	4	5	6	7	8	Final
(United States) Erika Brown 🔨	2	0	1	1	0	1	0	X	5
(Sweden) Margaretha Sigfridsson	0	1	0	0	1	0	1	X	3

=== Draw 10 ===
Saturday, October 24, 5:00 pm

Sheet 1	1	2	3	4	5	6	7	8	Final
(Manitoba) Cathy Overton-Clapham	0	3	1	0	1	0	2	X	7
(British Columbia) Kelly Scott 🔨	1	0	0	2	0	1	0	X	4

Sheet 2	1	2	3	4	5	6	7	8	Final
(Saskatchewan) Sherry Anderson	0	0	0	1	0	1	0	X	2
(Manitoba) Kristy McDonald 🔨	0	2	1	0	1	0	1	X	5

Sheet 3	1	2	3	4	5	6	7	8	9	Final
(Sweden) Cissi Östlund	0	0	0	1	3	0	1	0	1	6
(Saskatchewan) Team Eberle 🔨	0	3	0	0	0	1	0	1	0	5

Sheet 4	1	2	3	4	5	6	7	8	Final
(South Korea) Kim Eun-jung	0	3	0	5	X	X	X	X	8
(United States) Nina Roth 🔨	0	0	1	0	X	X	X	X	1

Sheet 5	1	2	3	4	5	6	7	8	Final
(United States) Jamie Sinclair 🔨	1	0	0	1	0	0	X	X	2
(Saskatchewan) Stefanie Lawton	0	2	2	0	0	3	X	X	7

Sheet 6	1	2	3	4	5	6	7	8	Final
(Manitoba) Kerri Einarson	0	2	1	0	0	0	0	0	3
(Manitoba) Jennifer Jones 🔨	1	0	0	1	1	2	0	1	6

=== Draw 11 ===
Saturday, October 24, 8:30 pm

Sheet 3	1	2	3	4	5	6	7	8	Final
(United States) Erika Brown 🔨	0	0	1	0	5	0	1	X	7
(United States) Nina Roth	0	1	0	1	0	1	0	X	3

Sheet 4	1	2	3	4	5	6	7	8	Final
(Manitoba) Kristy McDonald 🔨	0	0	1	1	1	0	0	3	6
(Sweden) Cissi Östlund	1	2	0	0	0	0	1	0	4

Sheet 5	1	2	3	4	5	6	7	8	9	Final
(Manitoba) Barb Spencer	0	0	2	0	1	0	2	1	0	6
(Manitoba) Kerri Einarson 🔨	0	2	0	1	0	3	0	0	1	7

Sheet 6	1	2	3	4	5	6	7	8	Final
(Manitoba) Cathy Overton-Clapham 🔨	1	0	2	0	0	1	0	1	5
(Saskatchewan) Stefanie Lawton	0	1	0	2	2	0	1	0	6

== Playoffs ==
Quarterfinals
A1	(Saskatchewan) Michelle Englot	7
C1	(Manitoba) Kerri Einarson	5
B2	(South Korea) Kim Eun-jung	5
C2	(Manitoba) Kristy McDonald	4
A2	(Ontario) Tracy Fleury	8
C3	(Saskatchewan) Stefanie Lawton	3
B1	(Manitoba) Jennifer Jones	5
C4	(United States) Erika Brown	2

Semifinals
A1	(Saskatchewan) Michelle Englot	4
B2	(South Korea) Kim Eun-jung	6
A2	(Ontario) Tracy Fleury	5
B1	(Manitoba) Jennifer Jones	6

Final
B2	(South Korea) Kim Eun-jung	7
B1	(Manitoba) Jennifer Jones	6

=== Quarterfinals ===
Sunday, October 25, 10:00 am

Team	1	2	3	4	5	6	7	8	Final
(Saskatchewan) Michelle Englot 🔨	2	0	2	1	0	2	0	X	7
(Manitoba) Kerri Einarson	0	1	0	0	2	0	2	X	5

Team	1	2	3	4	5	6	7	8	Final
(South Korea) Kim Eun-jung 🔨	1	0	0	1	0	2	0	1	5
(Manitoba) Kristy McDonald	0	0	2	0	1	0	1	0	4

Team	1	2	3	4	5	6	7	8	Final
(Ontario) Tracy Fleury 🔨	1	0	2	2	0	1	2	X	8
(Saskatchewan) Stefanie Lawton	0	2	0	0	1	0	0	X	3

Team	1	2	3	4	5	6	7	8	Final
(Manitoba) Jennifer Jones 🔨	1	0	0	0	2	2	0	X	5
(United States) Erika Brown	0	0	0	1	0	0	1	X	2

=== Semifinals ===
Sunday, October 25, 2:00 pm

Team	1	2	3	4	5	6	7	8	Final
(Saskatchewan) Michelle Englot 🔨	0	0	0	1	0	2	1	0	4
(South Korea) Kim Eun-jung	0	1	1	0	3	0	0	1	6

Team	1	2	3	4	5	6	7	8	Final
(Ontario) Tracy Fleury 🔨	1	0	0	1	0	0	3	0	5
(Manitoba) Jennifer Jones	0	2	0	0	2	1	0	1	6

=== Final ===
Sunday, October 25, 6:00 pm

Sheet 6	1	2	3	4	5	6	7	8	Final
(South Korea) Kim Eun-jung	0	0	0	3	0	4	0	0	7
(Manitoba) Jennifer Jones 🔨	0	3	0	0	1	0	1	1	6
