= 2024 Korean Mixed Doubles Curling Championship =

National mixed doubles curling championship

2024 KB Financial Korean Mixed Doubles Curling Championship
- Host city: Jincheon, South Korea
- Arena: Jincheon National Training Centre
- Dates: July 20–28
- Winner: Gangwon B
- Female: Kim Kyeong-ae
- Male: Seong Ji-hoon
- Finalist: Gangwon A (C. Kim / K. Lee)

The 2024 Korean Mixed Doubles Curling Championship (branded as the 2024 KB Financial Korean Mixed Doubles Curling Championship), Korea's national mixed doubles curling championship, was held from July 20 to 28 at the Jincheon National Training Centre in Jincheon, South Korea. The winning pair of Kim Kyeong-ae and Seong Ji-hoon became the Korean National Team for the 2024–25 curling season. They represented Korea at the 2025 World Mixed Doubles Curling Championship in Fredericton, New Brunswick, Canada and the 2025 Asian Winter Games in Harbin, China. Through regional qualifiers, the field was narrowed down from over fifty teams to twenty-one who competed in the national championship. The preliminary round was held in a round robin format which will qualify the top eight teams overall for the playoff round. For the first time in championship history, players from different regions were able to compete together, forming a composite team. Notable examples of this included Gangwon's Park Jong-duk competing in Seoul, Chuncheon's Yang Tae-i competing in Gyeongbuk and Gyeongbuk's Kim Chang-min competing in Gangwon, though he did not qualify for the national championship.

Two-time defending champions Kim Ji-yoon and Jeong Byeong-jin returned to try to win a third straight title after placing second in the Seoul qualifier. The 2023 runner-up pair of Kim Hye-rin and Yoo Min-hyeon also qualified after finishing third in the Gangwon qualifier. Other notable participants included both Kim Min-ji and Seol Ye-ji, members of the number three ranked women's Gim Eun-ji rink, pairing up with Park Jin-woong and Kim San respectively. Kim Cho-hi and Kim Kyeong-ae, both members of the Kim Eun-jung Gangneung rink competed with their respective partners Lee Ki-bok and Seong Ji-hoon while Yang Tae-i and Kim Soo-hyuk formed a composite team competing out of Gyeongbuk.

== Medalists ==
The three teams that qualified out of the Gangwon all reached the podium.

	Gold	Silver	Bronze
Team	Gangwon B Kim Kyeong-ae; Seong Ji-hoon	Gangwon A Kim Cho-hi; Lee Ki-bok	Chuncheon; Kim Hye-rin; Yoo Min-hyeon

== Qualification process ==
Regional Qualifiers	Vacancies	Qualified
Seoul Qualifier	5	Kim Ji-yoon / Jeong Byeong-jin; Lee Eun-chae / Kim Min-woo; Park You-been / Kim Jeong-min; Yang Seung-hee / Lee Jeong-jae; Ahn Jin-hee / Park Jong-duk
Gyeongbuk Qualifier	3	Yang Tae-i / Kim Soo-hyuk; Kim Soo-hyun / Lee Jae-beom; Ahn Jeong-yeon / Kim Eun-bin
Gangwon Qualifier	3	Kim Cho-hi / Lee Ki-bok; Kim Kyeong-ae / Seong Ji-hoon; Kim Hye-rin / Yoo Min-hyeon
Jeonbuk Qualifier	4	Kang Bo-bae / Park Seong-min; Kim Min-seo / Kim Dae-seok; Kim Ji-soo / Kim Tae-woo; Shim Yu-jeong / Shin Seung-won
Gyeonggi Qualifier	3	Seol Ye-ji / Kim San; Kim Min-ji / Park Jin-woong; Kang Na-ra / Moon Si-woo
Chungbuk Region	2	Jo Da-hye / Cho Jang-yeon; Kim Soo-bin / Park Kyung-ho
Incheon Region	1	Lee Soo-bin / Kim Byeong-chan
TOTAL	21	

== Teams ==
The teams are listed as follows:

Team	Female	Male	Region
Chuncheon	Kim Hye-rin	Yoo Min-hyeon	Gangwon
Chungbuk A	Jo Da-hye	Cho Jang-yeon	Chungbuk
Chungbuk B	Kim Soo-bin	Park Kyung-ho	Chungbuk
Gangwon A	Kim Cho-hi	Lee Ki-bok	Gangwon
Gangwon B	Kim Kyeong-ae	Seong Ji-hoon	Gangwon
Gyeongbuk	Yang Tae-i	Kim Soo-hyuk	Gyeongbuk
Gyeonggi A	Seol Ye-ji	Kim San	Gyeonggi
Gyeonggi C	Kim Min-ji	Park Jin-woong	Gyeonggi
Gyeonggi D	Kang Na-ra	Moon Si-woo	Gyeonggi
Incheon	Lee Soo-bin	Kim Byeong-chan	Incheon
Jeonbuk A	Kang Bo-bae	Park Seong-min	Jeonbuk
Jeonbuk B	Kim Min-seo	Kim Dae-seok	Jeonbuk
Jeonbuk C	Kim Ji-soo	Kim Tae-woo	Jeonbuk
Jeonbuk D	Shim Yu-jeong	Shin Seung-won	Jeonbuk
Seoul A	Kim Ji-yoon	Jeong Byeong-jin	Seoul
Seoul B	Lee Eun-chae	Kim Min-woo	Seoul
Seoul C	Yang Seung-hee	Lee Jeong-jae	Seoul
Seoul D	Park You-been	Kim Jeong-min	Seoul
Seoul E	Ahn Jin-hee	Park Jong-duk	Seoul
Uiseong A	Ahn Jeong-yeon	Kim Eun-bin	Gyeongbuk
Uiseong B	Kim Soo-hyun	Lee Jae-beom	Gyeongbuk

== Round robin standings ==
Final Round Robin Standings

Key
Teams to Playoffs
Teams to Eighth Place Game

Pool A	Athletes	W	L	W–L	PF	PA	EW	EL	BE	SE	DSC
Chuncheon	Kim Hye-rin / Yoo Min-hyeon	5	1	1–0	56	25	26	15	0	13	37.8
Gyeongbuk	Yang Tae-i / Kim Soo-hyuk	5	1	0–1	46	28	23	18	0	10	31.6
Seoul A	Kim Ji-yoon / Jeong Byeong-jin	4	2	–	54	29	27	16	0	10	10.4
Jeonbuk A	Kang Bo-bae / Park Seong-min	3	3	–	35	31	21	21	0	8	42.4
Jeonbuk B	Kim Min-seo / Kim Dae-seok	2	4	–	26	44	18	24	0	8	48.2
Uiseong A	Ahn Jeong-yeon / Kim Eun-bin	1	5	1–0	26	36	22	21	0	10	37.4
Incheon	Lee Soo-bin / Kim Byeong-chan	1	5	0–1	17	67	8	30	0	2	100.1

Pool B	Athletes	W	L	W–L	PF	PA	EW	EL	BE	SE	DSC
Gangwon B	Kim Kyeong-ae / Seong Ji-hoon	5	1	–	54	26	25	15	0	11	38.4
Gyeonggi C	Kim Min-ji / Park Jin-woong	4	2	1–0	42	32	21	19	0	10	43.0
Seoul C	Yang Seung-hee / Lee Jeong-jae	4	2	0–1	43	32	27	18	0	14	41.4
Seoul D	Park You-been / Kim Jeong-min	3	3	1–0	39	32	23	18	0	11	19.9
Jeonbuk D	Shim Yu-jeong / Shin Seung-won	3	3	0–1	37	38	24	20	0	10	43.4
Gyeonggi D	Kang Na-ra / Moon Si-woo	2	4	–	31	42	18	23	0	11	60.6
Chungbuk A	Jo Da-hye / Cho Jang-yeon	0	6	–	11	55	6	31	0	1	45.7

Pool C	Athletes	W	L	W–L	PF	PA	EW	EL	BE	SE	DSC
Seoul E	Ahn Jin-hee / Park Jong-duk	5	1	1–0	43	24	28	17	0	13	43.3
Gangwon A	Kim Cho-hi / Lee Ki-bok	5	1	0–1	49	31	26	17	0	10	32.8
Seoul B	Lee Eun-chae / Kim Min-woo	4	2	–	39	31	24	21	0	7	51.8
Gyeonggi A	Seol Ye-ji / Kim San	3	3	–	40	39	23	23	0	7	58.1
Jeonbuk C	Kim Ji-soo / Kim Tae-woo	2	4	–	36	49	20	26	0	6	77.9
Uiseong B	Kim Soo-hyun / Lee Jae-beom	1	5	1–0	33	46	19	25	0	4	58.3
Chungbuk B	Kim Soo-bin / Park Kyung-ho	1	5	0–1	26	46	16	27	0	2	40.4

=== Ranking of third-placed teams ===
Of the three teams placing third in their respective groups, the team with the best Draw Shot Challenge qualified directly for the playoffs while the other two teams competed in the eighth-place game.

Team	Pool	DSC
Seoul A	A	10.4
Seoul C	B	41.4
Seoul B	C	51.8

== Round robin results ==
All draws are listed in Korea Standard Time (UTC+09:00).

=== Draw 1 ===
Saturday, July 20, 8:00 pm

Sheet A	1	2	3	4	5	6	7	8	Final
Jeonbuk B (M. Kim / D. Kim)	1	0	1	3	0	1	0	X	6
Uiseong A (Ahn / Kim) 🔨	0	1	0	0	2	0	1	X	4

Sheet B	1	2	3	4	5	6	7	8	Final
Incheon (S. Lee / B. Kim)	0	0	0	0	0	0	X	X	0
Chuncheon (Kim / Yoo) 🔨	4	2	3	1	2	2	X	X	14

Sheet C	1	2	3	4	5	6	7	8	Final
Seoul C (Yang / Lee) 🔨	0	0	2	0	0	1	X	X	3
Gyeonggi C (M. Kim / J. Park)	2	1	0	4	1	0	X	X	8

Sheet D	1	2	3	4	5	6	7	8	Final
Gyeonggi D (Kang / Moon)	0	0	0	4	0	0	0	X	4
Seoul D (Park / Kim) 🔨	2	4	1	0	1	1	2	X	11

Sheet E	1	2	3	4	5	6	7	8	Final
Jeonbuk C (J. Kim / T. Kim) 🔨	0	0	2	0	0	1	0	X	3
Seoul E (Ahn / Park)	3	2	0	1	2	0	2	X	10

=== Draw 2 ===
Sunday, July 21, 8:00 am

Sheet A	1	2	3	4	5	6	7	8	Final
Jeonbuk D (Shim / Shin) 🔨	2	1	3	0	1	1	1	X	9
Chungbuk A (Jo / Cho)	0	0	0	2	0	0	0	X	2

Sheet B	1	2	3	4	5	6	7	8	Final
Uiseong B (S. Kim / J. Lee) 🔨	1	0	0	2	0	1	0	1	5
Gyeonggi A (Seol / Kim)	0	1	1	0	2	0	3	0	7

Sheet C	1	2	3	4	5	6	7	8	Final
Seoul B (E. Lee / M. Kim) 🔨	1	0	1	0	1	0	0	X	3
Gangwon A (C. Kim / K. Lee)	0	2	0	3	0	2	1	X	8

Sheet D	1	2	3	4	5	6	7	8	Final
Jeonbuk A (Kang / Park) 🔨	1	0	0	1	0	1	0	X	3
Gyeongbuk (Yang / Kim)	0	2	2	0	2	0	2	X	8

=== Draw 3 ===
Sunday, July 21, 12:00 pm

Sheet C	1	2	3	4	5	6	7	8	Final
Incheon (S. Lee / B. Kim)	0	0	1	0	0	0	X	X	1
Seoul A (Kim / Jeong) 🔨	4	2	0	5	4	2	X	X	17

Sheet E	1	2	3	4	5	6	7	8	Final
Jeonbuk A (Kang / Park)	1	2	1	1	0	0	1	X	6
Jeonbuk B (M. Kim / D. Kim) 🔨	0	0	0	0	1	1	0	X	2

=== Draw 4 ===
Sunday, July 21, 4:00 pm

Sheet A	1	2	3	4	5	6	7	8	Final
Gyeonggi D (Kang / Moon)	0	1	0	0	2	0	X	X	3
Gangwon B (Kim / Seong) 🔨	4	0	3	2	0	2	X	X	11

Sheet B	1	2	3	4	5	6	7	8	Final
Seoul D (Park / Kim) 🔨	2	1	0	2	1	2	X	X	8
Chungbuk A (Jo / Cho)	0	0	1	0	0	0	X	X	1

Sheet D	1	2	3	4	5	6	7	8	9	Final
Jeonbuk D (Shim / Shin) 🔨	2	0	1	0	0	1	0	3	1	8
Seoul C (Yang / Lee)	0	2	0	2	1	0	2	0	0	7

=== Draw 5 ===
Sunday, July 21, 8:00 pm

Sheet A	1	2	3	4	5	6	7	8	Final
Uiseong B (S. Kim / J. Lee)	0	5	1	0	3	1	X	X	10
Chungbuk B (S. Kim / K. Park) 🔨	1	0	0	2	0	0	X	X	3

Sheet C	1	2	3	4	5	6	7	8	Final
Chuncheon (Kim / Yoo) 🔨	4	0	1	0	4	0	X	X	9
Gyeongbuk (Yang / Kim)	0	1	0	2	0	1	X	X	4

Sheet D	1	2	3	4	5	6	7	8	Final
Seoul B (E. Lee / M. Kim)	0	1	0	1	0	2	2	0	6
Jeonbuk C (J. Kim / T. Kim) 🔨	1	0	2	0	1	0	0	3	7

Sheet E	1	2	3	4	5	6	7	8	Final
Gyeonggi A (Seol / Kim) 🔨	0	0	3	0	1	0	0	X	4
Gangwon A (C. Kim / K. Lee)	3	1	0	2	0	1	3	X	10

=== Draw 6 ===
Monday, July 22, 9:00 am

Sheet A	1	2	3	4	5	6	7	8	Final
Gyeonggi A (Seol / Kim)	0	1	2	0	0	0	1	0	4
Seoul E (Ahn / Park) 🔨	1	0	0	1	1	1	0	2	6

Sheet B	1	2	3	4	5	6	7	8	Final
Gyeongbuk (Yang / Kim)	0	1	0	0	4	0	4	0	9
Seoul A (Kim / Jeong) 🔨	1	0	1	1	0	3	0	1	7

Sheet C	1	2	3	4	5	6	7	8	Final
Chungbuk A (Jo / Cho)	1	0	0	0	0	0	X	X	1
Gangwon B (Kim / Seong) 🔨	0	2	2	2	3	1	X	X	10

Sheet D	1	2	3	4	5	6	7	8	Final
Chuncheon (Kim / Yoo) 🔨	5	1	1	1	0	2	X	X	10
Uiseong A (Ahn / Kim)	0	0	0	0	1	0	X	X	1

Sheet E	1	2	3	4	5	6	7	8	Final
Seoul D (Park / Kim)	0	2	0	1	0	0	X	X	3
Gyeonggi C (M. Kim / J. Park) 🔨	5	0	1	0	2	1	X	X	9

=== Draw 7 ===
Monday, July 22, 2:00 pm

Sheet A	1	2	3	4	5	6	7	8	Final
Incheon (S. Lee / B. Kim)	0	1	2	0	0	0	X	X	3
Jeonbuk A (Kang / Park) 🔨	4	0	0	4	1	4	X	X	13

Sheet B	1	2	3	4	5	6	7	8	Final
Gangwon A (C. Kim / K. Lee) 🔨	1	1	1	0	2	0	3	X	8
Chungbuk B (S. Kim / K. Park)	0	0	0	2	0	1	0	X	3

=== Draw 8 ===
Monday, July 22, 7:00 pm

Sheet B	1	2	3	4	5	6	7	8	Final
Jeonbuk A (Kang / Park)	1	0	1	0	1	0	0	3	6
Uiseong A (Ahn / Kim) 🔨	0	1	0	2	0	1	1	0	5

Sheet C	1	2	3	4	5	6	7	8	Final
Incheon (S. Lee / B. Kim)	0	1	0	0	0	4	3	X	8
Jeonbuk B (M. Kim / D. Kim) 🔨	2	0	1	1	1	0	0	X	5

Sheet D	1	2	3	4	5	6	7	8	Final
Gyeonggi D (Kang / Moon)	0	3	0	0	0	0	2	X	5
Jeonbuk D (Shim / Shin) 🔨	2	0	1	2	2	2	0	X	9

Sheet E	1	2	3	4	5	6	7	8	Final
Uiseong B (S. Kim / J. Lee)	0	0	0	0	2	0	1	X	3
Seoul B (E. Lee / M. Kim) 🔨	6	1	1	1	0	2	0	X	11

=== Draw 9 ===
Tuesday, July 23, 8:00 am

Sheet A	1	2	3	4	5	6	7	8	Final
Jeonbuk D (Shim / Shin) 🔨	0	0	2	1	2	0	1	0	6
Gyeonggi C (M. Kim / J. Park)	3	1	0	0	0	2	0	1	7

Sheet B	1	2	3	4	5	6	7	8	Final
Gyeonggi D (Kang / Moon)	2	1	0	0	0	0	0	0	3
Seoul C (Yang / Lee) 🔨	0	0	1	1	1	1	1	2	7

Sheet C	1	2	3	4	5	6	7	8	Final
Seoul D (Park / Kim) 🔨	0	1	0	0	4	0	0	X	5
Gangwon B (Kim / Seong)	1	0	2	1	0	3	1	X	8

=== Draw 10 ===
Tuesday, July 23, 12:00 pm

Sheet A	1	2	3	4	5	6	7	8	Final
Chuncheon (Kim / Yoo)	0	3	1	0	1	0	4	0	9
Seoul A (Kim / Jeong) 🔨	1	0	0	2	0	3	0	2	8

Sheet B	1	2	3	4	5	6	7	8	Final
Uiseong B (S. Kim / J. Lee) 🔨	0	2	0	1	0	0	2	0	5
Jeonbuk C (J. Kim / T. Kim)	1	0	3	0	1	1	0	2	8

Sheet D	1	2	3	4	5	6	7	8	Final
Gyeonggi A (Seol / Kim)	1	1	0	4	0	2	0	1	9
Chungbuk B (S. Kim / K. Park) 🔨	0	0	3	0	2	0	2	0	7

Sheet E	1	2	3	4	5	6	7	8	Final
Seoul B (E. Lee / M. Kim)	0	3	0	1	1	0	0	1	6
Seoul E (Ahn / Park) 🔨	1	0	1	0	0	2	1	0	5

=== Draw 11 ===
Tuesday, July 23, 4:00 pm

Sheet A	1	2	3	4	5	6	7	8	Final
Incheon (S. Lee / B. Kim)	0	0	0	0	0	3	X	X	3
Gyeongbuk (Yang / Kim) 🔨	2	3	2	1	2	0	X	X	10

Sheet B	1	2	3	4	5	6	7	8	Final
Uiseong A (Ahn / Kim)	0	0	0	1	0	1	1	X	3
Seoul A (Kim / Jeong) 🔨	2	1	1	0	2	0	0	X	6

Sheet C	1	2	3	4	5	6	7	8	Final
Seoul E (Ahn / Park)	1	1	2	0	1	1	0	X	6
Chungbuk B (S. Kim / K. Park) 🔨	0	0	0	1	0	0	2	X	3

Sheet D	1	2	3	4	5	6	7	8	Final
Gyeonggi C (M. Kim / J. Park)	0	1	0	0	3	0	3	X	7
Gangwon B (Kim / Seong) 🔨	2	0	2	3	0	3	0	X	10

Sheet E	1	2	3	4	5	6	7	8	Final
Gyeonggi D (Kang / Moon)	0	2	2	1	1	2	X	X	8
Chungbuk A (Jo / Cho) 🔨	2	0	0	0	0	0	X	X	2

=== Draw 12 ===
Tuesday, July 23, 8:00 pm

Sheet A	1	2	3	4	5	6	7	8	Final
Seoul D (Park / Kim) 🔨	0	0	0	1	0	3	1	0	5
Seoul C (Yang / Lee)	1	1	2	0	3	0	0	1	8

Sheet B	1	2	3	4	5	6	7	8	Final
Chuncheon (Kim / Yoo)	1	0	2	2	0	0	2	0	7
Jeonbuk B (M. Kim / D. Kim) 🔨	0	1	0	0	3	3	0	1	8

Sheet D	1	2	3	4	5	6	7	8	Final
Uiseong B (S. Kim / J. Lee)	1	0	2	0	0	2	0	X	5
Gangwon A (C. Kim / K. Lee) 🔨	0	1	0	1	3	0	5	X	10

Sheet E	1	2	3	4	5	6	7	8	Final
Gyeonggi A (Seol / Kim) 🔨	3	1	0	4	0	2	1	X	11
Jeonbuk C (J. Kim / T. Kim)	0	0	3	0	2	0	0	X	5

=== Draw 13 ===
Wednesday, July 24, 9:00 am

Sheet D	1	2	3	4	5	6	7	8	Final
Gyeongbuk (Yang / Kim) 🔨	0	1	3	3	1	1	X	X	9
Jeonbuk B (M. Kim / D. Kim)	1	0	0	0	0	0	X	X	1

=== Draw 14 ===
Wednesday, July 24, 2:00 pm

Sheet A	1	2	3	4	5	6	7	8	Final
Chungbuk A (Jo / Cho)	0	0	0	3	0	0	X	X	3
Seoul C (Yang / Lee) 🔨	2	2	2	0	3	2	X	X	11

Sheet C	1	2	3	4	5	6	7	8	Final
Gyeonggi D (Kang / Moon) 🔨	0	3	1	1	1	1	1	X	8
Gyeonggi C (M. Kim / J. Park)	2	0	0	0	0	0	0	X	2

Sheet D	1	2	3	4	5	6	7	8	Final
Jeonbuk A (Kang / Park)	1	0	0	0	0	2	0	X	3
Seoul A (Kim / Jeong) 🔨	0	1	2	1	1	0	1	X	6

Sheet E	1	2	3	4	5	6	7	8	Final
Jeonbuk D (Shim / Shin)	0	1	0	2	0	0	X	X	3
Gangwon B (Kim / Seong) 🔨	2	0	3	0	2	3	X	X	10

=== Draw 15 ===
Wednesday, July 24, 7:00 pm

Sheet A	1	2	3	4	5	6	7	8	Final
Gangwon A (C. Kim / K. Lee) 🔨	2	2	2	0	0	2	0	2	10
Jeonbuk C (J. Kim / T. Kim)	0	0	0	3	1	0	3	0	7

Sheet B	1	2	3	4	5	6	7	8	Final
Seoul B (E. Lee / M. Kim)	0	1	1	0	1	0	4	X	7
Chungbuk B (S. Kim / K. Park) 🔨	1	0	0	1	0	1	0	X	3

Sheet D	1	2	3	4	5	6	7	8	Final
Uiseong B (S. Kim / J. Lee)	0	1	1	0	0	3	0	0	5
Seoul E (Ahn / Park) 🔨	2	0	0	2	1	0	1	1	7

Sheet E	1	2	3	4	5	6	7	8	Final
Incheon (S. Lee / B. Kim)	0	0	0	0	0	2	0	X	2
Uiseong A (Ahn / Kim) 🔨	1	2	1	1	1	0	2	X	8

=== Draw 16 ===
Thursday, July 25, 9:00 am

Sheet A	1	2	3	4	5	6	7	8	Final
Gyeongbuk (Yang / Kim) 🔨	0	0	0	0	3	0	1	2	6
Uiseong A (Ahn / Kim)	1	1	1	1	0	1	0	0	5

Sheet C	1	2	3	4	5	6	7	8	Final
Chuncheon (Kim / Yoo)	2	0	2	1	0	2	0	X	7
Jeonbuk A (Kang / Park) 🔨	0	1	0	0	2	0	1	X	4

Sheet E	1	2	3	4	5	6	7	8	Final
Jeonbuk B (M. Kim / D. Kim)	0	0	2	0	1	1	0	X	4
Seoul A (Kim / Jeong) 🔨	2	1	0	4	0	0	3	X	10

=== Draw 17 ===
Thursday, July 25, 2:00 pm

Sheet B	1	2	3	4	5	6	7	8	Final
Chungbuk A (Jo / Cho)	0	0	0	2	0	0	X	X	2
Gyeonggi C (M. Kim / J. Park) 🔨	2	2	1	0	2	2	X	X	9

Sheet C	1	2	3	4	5	6	7	8	Final
Seoul D (Park / Kim)	1	0	1	1	0	3	1	X	7
Jeonbuk D (Shim / Shin) 🔨	0	1	0	0	1	0	0	X	2

Sheet E	1	2	3	4	5	6	7	8	Final
Seoul C (Yang / Lee) 🔨	0	1	0	3	1	1	0	1	7
Gangwon B (Kim / Seong)	2	0	1	0	0	0	2	0	5

=== Draw 18 ===
Thursday, July 25, 7:00 pm

Sheet A	1	2	3	4	5	6	7	8	Final
Gyeonggi A (Seol / Kim)	0	1	2	0	0	1	0	1	5
Seoul B (E. Lee / M. Kim) 🔨	1	0	0	1	2	0	2	0	6

Sheet B	1	2	3	4	5	6	7	8	Final
Gangwon A (C. Kim / K. Lee)	0	1	0	0	1	1	0	X	3
Seoul E (Ahn / Park) 🔨	2	0	1	2	0	0	4	X	9

Sheet E	1	2	3	4	5	6	7	8	Final
Jeonbuk C (J. Kim / T. Kim)	1	0	0	2	2	1	0	0	6
Chungbuk B (S. Kim / K. Park) 🔨	0	2	3	0	0	0	1	1	7

== Eighth place game ==
Friday, July 26, 9:00 am

Sheet C	1	2	3	4	5	6	7	8	Final
Seoul C (Yang / Lee) 🔨	0	2	0	2	2	0	2	X	8
Seoul B (E. Lee / M. Kim)	1	0	1	0	0	1	0	X	3

== Playoffs ==
Quarterfinals
1	Chuncheon	8
8	Seoul C	4
4	Gyeongbuk	5
5	Gangwon A	10
2	Gangwon B	6
7	Seoul A	4
3	Seoul E	7
6	Gyeonggi C	4

Semifinals
1	Chuncheon	6	5	X
5	Gangwon A	7	6	X
2	Gangwon B	7	5	9
3	Seoul E	2	6	2

Finals
5	Gangwon A	5	3	X
2	Gangwon B	7	7	X

Bronze medal game
1	Chuncheon	7
3	Seoul E	5

=== Quarterfinals ===
Friday, July 26, 2:00 pm

Sheet A	1	2	3	4	5	6	7	8	Final
Gangwon B (Kim / Seong) 🔨	0	0	1	0	3	0	2	X	6
Seoul A (Kim / Jeong)	1	1	0	1	0	1	0	X	4

Sheet C	1	2	3	4	5	6	7	8	Final
Gyeongbuk (Yang / Kim)	0	2	0	2	0	1	0	X	5
Gangwon A (C. Kim / K. Lee) 🔨	3	0	2	0	2	0	3	X	10

Sheet D	1	2	3	4	5	6	7	8	Final
Chuncheon (Kim / Yoo) 🔨	1	1	0	0	5	0	1	X	8
Seoul C (Yang / Lee)	0	0	2	1	0	1	0	X	4

Sheet E	1	2	3	4	5	6	7	8	Final
Seoul E (Ahn / Park) 🔨	1	1	0	0	2	0	3	X	7
Gyeonggi C (M. Kim / J. Park)	0	0	2	1	0	1	0	X	4

=== Semifinals ===
==== Game 1 ====
Friday, July 26, 7:00 pm

Sheet B	1	2	3	4	5	6	7	8	Final
Chuncheon (Kim / Yoo)	1	0	1	0	2	0	2	0	6
Gangwon A (C. Kim / K. Lee) 🔨	0	1	0	1	0	3	0	2	7

Sheet D	1	2	3	4	5	6	7	8	Final
Gangwon B (Kim / Seong) 🔨	2	3	1	0	1	0	X	X	7
Seoul E (Ahn / Park)	0	0	0	1	0	1	X	X	2

==== Game 2 ====
Saturday, July 27, 9:00 am

Sheet C	1	2	3	4	5	6	7	8	9	Final
Gangwon B (Kim / Seong) 🔨	1	1	0	0	0	2	1	0	0	5
Seoul E (Ahn / Park)	0	0	2	1	1	0	0	1	1	6

Sheet D	1	2	3	4	5	6	7	8	Final
Chuncheon (Kim / Yoo) 🔨	0	3	0	0	1	0	1	0	5
Gangwon A (C. Kim / K. Lee)	1	0	1	2	0	1	0	1	6

==== Game 3 ====
Saturday, July 27, 2:00 pm

Sheet E	1	2	3	4	5	6	7	8	Final
Gangwon B (Kim / Seong) 🔨	1	0	3	2	0	1	2	X	9
Seoul E (Ahn / Park)	0	1	0	0	1	0	0	X	2

=== Bronze medal game ===
Saturday, July 27, 7:00 pm

Sheet C	1	2	3	4	5	6	7	8	Final
Chuncheon (Kim / Yoo)	0	1	1	0	4	0	0	1	7
Seoul E (Ahn / Park) 🔨	1	0	0	1	0	2	1	0	5

=== Finals ===
==== Game 1 ====
Saturday, July 27, 7:00 pm

Sheet D	1	2	3	4	5	6	7	8	Final
Gangwon A (C. Kim / K. Lee) 🔨	2	0	1	0	0	1	1	0	5
Gangwon B (Kim / Seong)	0	1	0	3	2	0	0	1	7

==== Game 2 ====
Sunday, July 28, 10:00 am

Sheet C	1	2	3	4	5	6	7	8	Final
Gangwon A (C. Kim / K. Lee) 🔨	0	0	1	0	2	0	0	X	3
Gangwon B (Kim / Seong)	2	2	0	1	0	1	1	X	7

== Final standings ==
Place	Team	Athletes
1st place, gold medalist(s)	Gangwon B	Kim Kyeong-ae / Seong Ji-hoon
2nd place, silver medalist(s)	Gangwon A	Kim Cho-hi / Lee Ki-bok
3rd place, bronze medalist(s)	Chuncheon	Kim Hye-rin / Yoo Min-hyeon
4	Seoul E	Ahn Jin-hee / Park Jong-duk
5	Gyeongbuk	Yang Tae-i / Kim Soo-hyuk
5	Gyeonggi C	Kim Min-ji / Park Jin-woong
5	Seoul A	Kim Ji-yoon / Jeong Byeong-jin
5	Seoul C	Yang Seung-hee / Lee Jeong-jae
9	Seoul B	Lee Eun-chae / Kim Min-woo
10	Seoul D	Park You-been / Kim Jeong-min
11	Jeonbuk A	Kang Bo-bae / Park Seong-min
12	Gyeonggi A	Seol Ye-ji / Kim San
13	Jeonbuk D	Shim Yu-jeong / Shin Seung-won
14	Jeonbuk B	Kim Min-seo / Kim Dae-seok
15	Jeonbuk C	Kim Ji-soo / Kim Tae-woo
16	Gyeonggi D	Kang Na-ra / Moon Si-woo
17	Uiseong A	Ahn Jeong-yeon / Kim Eun-bin
18	Uiseong B	Kim Soo-hyun / Lee Jae-beom
19	Chungbuk B	Kim Soo-bin / Park Kyung-ho
20	Incheon	Lee Soo-bin / Kim Byeong-chan
21	Chungbuk A	Jo Da-hye / Cho Jang-yeon

== See also ==
- 2024 Korean Curling Championships
