= 2023 Karuizawa International Curling Championships =

- Host city: Karuizawa, Japan
- Arena: Karuizawa Ice Park
- Dates: December 1–3
- Men's winner: (Canada) Team Gushue
- Curling club: St. John's CC, St. John's, Newfoundland and Labrador
- Skip: Brad Gushue
- Third: Mark Nichols
- Second: E. J. Harnden
- Lead: Geoff Walker
- Coach: Caleb Flaxey
- Finalist: (Hokkaido) Hayato Sato
- Women's winner: (Nagano Prefecture) Team Kitazawa
- Curling club: Karuizawa CC, Karuizawa
- Skip: Ikue Kitazawa
- Third: Seina Nakajima
- Second: Ami Enami
- Lead: Minori Suzuki
- Alternate: Hasumi Ishigooka
- Coach: Yusuke Morozumi
- Finalist: (South Korea) Kim Eun-jung

The 2023 Karuizawa International Curling Championships were held from December 1 to 3 at the Karuizawa Ice Park in Karuizawa, Nagano, Japan. The total purse for the event was ¥ 1,500,000 on both the men's and women's sides.

The 2023 event featured five previous champion skips: Yusuke Morozumi (2011, 2012 & 2017), Jennifer Jones (2011 & 2014), Kim Chang-min (2014), Yuta Matsumura (2019) and Kim Eun-jung (2022). Kaitlyn Lawes who won both championships with Jones returned skipping her own team.

In the men's final, Brad Gushue and his Canadian championship team of Mark Nichols, E. J. Harnden and Geoff Walker capped off an undefeated run by defeating Sapporo International University's Hayato Sato 7–1. The team from St. John's, Newfoundland and Labrador dominated the championship game, getting out to an early three-point lead and stealing two in the seventh end to secure the win. Niklas Edin took third in the men's division with a 9–3 thrashing of Karuizawa's Yusuke Morozumi.

In the women's final, Chubu Electric Power snapped the ten-game win streak of South Korea's Kim Eun-jung to win their first tour event of the 2023–24 season. The team, including skip Ikue Kitazawa, Seina Nakajima, Ami Enami, Minori Suzuki and Hasumi Ishigooka took control of the final game with three in the fourth end and held on for a 7–6 victory. Canada's Kaitlyn Lawes won 7–4 over Team Yoshimura, skipped by Yuna Kotani, to take third. Surprisingly, the top ranked team coming into the event, Team Jennifer Jones of Winnipeg, went winless in their three games.

== Men ==
=== Teams ===
The teams are listed as follows:

| Skip | Third | Second | Lead | Alternate | Locale |
|---|---|---|---|---|---|
| Niklas Edin | Oskar Eriksson | Rasmus Wranå | Christoffer Sundgren | | Karlstad, Sweden |
| Brad Gushue | Mark Nichols | E. J. Harnden | Geoff Walker | | St. John's, Newfoundland and Labrador, Canada |
| Kohsuke Hirata | Shingo Usui | Ryota Meguro | Yoshiya Miura | Kosuke Aita | (Hokkaido) Kitami, Japan |
| Juon Ishimura (Fourth) | Youn Ishimura (Skip) | Yuto Nakagawa | Shunki Kudo | Kuya Kawamura | (Aomori Prefecture) Aomori, Japan |
| Kim Soo-hyuk (Fourth) | Kim Chang-min (Skip) | Kim Hak-kyun | Jeon Jae-ik | | Uiseong, South Korea |
| Yusuke Morozumi | Yuta Matsumura | Ryotaro Shukuya | Masaki Iwai | Kosuke Morozumi | (Nagano Prefecture) Karuizawa, Japan |
| Kotaro Noguchi | Yuto Kamada | Hiroshi Kato | Yuki Yoshimura | Hiromasa Yonehara | (Miyagi Prefecture) Sendai, Japan |
| Go Aoki (Fourth) | Hayato Sato (Skip) | Kouki Ogiwara | Kazushi Nino | Ayato Sasaki | (Hokkaido) Sapporo, Japan |

=== Round robin standings ===
Final Round Robin Standings

Key
| Teams to Playoffs |

| Pool A | W | L | PF | PA | DSC |
|---|---|---|---|---|---|
| (Canada) Brad Gushue | 3 | 0 | 22 | 8 | 65.68 |
| (Nagano Prefecture) Yusuke Morozumi | 1 | 2 | 19 | 17 | 14.13 |
| (South Korea) Kim Chang-min | 1 | 2 | 9 | 19 | 89.05 |
| (Hokkaido) Kohsuke Hirata | 1 | 2 | 14 | 20 | 112.43 |

| Pool B | W | L | PF | PA | DSC |
|---|---|---|---|---|---|
| (Hokkaido) Hayato Sato | 3 | 0 | 21 | 12 | 90.33 |
| (Sweden) Niklas Edin | 2 | 1 | 26 | 16 | 21.17 |
| (Miyagi Prefecture) Kotaro Noguchi | 1 | 2 | 15 | 22 | 86.03 |
| (Aomori Prefecture) Youn Ishimura | 0 | 3 | 12 | 24 | 79.03 |

=== Round robin results ===
All draw times are listed in Japan Standard Time (UTC+09:00).

==== Draw 1 ====
Friday, December 1, 9:00 am

| Sheet A | 1 | 2 | 3 | 4 | 5 | 6 | 7 | 8 | Final |
| (Miyagi Prefecture) Kotaro Noguchi | 0 | 3 | 0 | 3 | 0 | 2 | 1 | X | 9 |
| (Aomori Prefecture) Youn Ishimura 🔨 | 2 | 0 | 2 | 0 | 1 | 0 | 0 | X | 5 |

| Sheet C | 1 | 2 | 3 | 4 | 5 | 6 | 7 | 8 | Final |
| (Sweden) Niklas Edin 🔨 | 3 | 0 | 1 | 0 | 2 | 0 | 0 | X | 6 |
| (Hokkaido) Hayato Sato | 0 | 1 | 0 | 3 | 0 | 3 | 2 | X | 9 |

| Sheet F | 1 | 2 | 3 | 4 | 5 | 6 | 7 | 8 | Final |
| (South Korea) Kim Chang-min 🔨 | 0 | 0 | 1 | 0 | 0 | 1 | 0 | X | 2 |
| (Canada) Brad Gushue | 1 | 1 | 0 | 1 | 1 | 0 | 2 | X | 6 |

==== Draw 2 ====
Friday, December 1, 1:00 pm

| Sheet B | 1 | 2 | 3 | 4 | 5 | 6 | 7 | 8 | Final |
| (Hokkaido) Hayato Sato | 1 | 1 | 0 | 3 | 1 | 0 | 0 | X | 6 |
| (Aomori Prefecture) Youn Ishimura 🔨 | 0 | 0 | 1 | 0 | 0 | 1 | 1 | X | 3 |

| Sheet E | 1 | 2 | 3 | 4 | 5 | 6 | 7 | 8 | 9 | Final |
| (Nagano Prefecture) Yusuke Morozumi 🔨 | 0 | 0 | 2 | 0 | 0 | 2 | 0 | 1 | 0 | 5 |
| (South Korea) Kim Chang-min | 0 | 1 | 0 | 1 | 1 | 0 | 2 | 0 | 1 | 6 |

==== Draw 3 ====
Friday, December 1, 5:00 pm

| Sheet E | 1 | 2 | 3 | 4 | 5 | 6 | 7 | 8 | Final |
| (Canada) Brad Gushue 🔨 | 3 | 2 | 0 | 2 | 1 | 1 | X | X | 9 |
| (Hokkaido) Kohsuke Hirata | 0 | 0 | 2 | 0 | 0 | 0 | X | X | 2 |

==== Draw 4 ====
Saturday, December 2, 9:00 am

| Sheet A | 1 | 2 | 3 | 4 | 5 | 6 | 7 | 8 | Final |
| (Nagano Prefecture) Yusuke Morozumi 🔨 | 1 | 0 | 5 | 2 | 0 | 2 | X | X | 10 |
| (Hokkaido) Kohsuke Hirata | 0 | 3 | 0 | 0 | 1 | 0 | X | X | 4 |

| Sheet B | 1 | 2 | 3 | 4 | 5 | 6 | 7 | 8 | Final |
| (Hokkaido) Hayato Sato | 0 | 0 | 1 | 0 | 0 | 3 | 1 | 1 | 6 |
| (Miyagi Prefecture) Kotaro Noguchi 🔨 | 0 | 0 | 0 | 0 | 3 | 0 | 0 | 0 | 3 |

| Sheet F | 1 | 2 | 3 | 4 | 5 | 6 | 7 | 8 | Final |
| (Aomori Prefecture) Youn Ishimura | 1 | 0 | 0 | 1 | 0 | 2 | X | X | 4 |
| (Sweden) Niklas Edin 🔨 | 0 | 2 | 3 | 0 | 4 | 0 | X | X | 9 |

==== Draw 5 ====
Saturday, December 2, 1:00 pm

| Sheet A | 1 | 2 | 3 | 4 | 5 | 6 | 7 | 8 | Final |
| (Sweden) Niklas Edin 🔨 | 4 | 3 | 0 | 4 | 0 | X | X | X | 11 |
| (Miyagi Prefecture) Kotaro Noguchi | 0 | 0 | 1 | 0 | 2 | X | X | X | 3 |

| Sheet B | 1 | 2 | 3 | 4 | 5 | 6 | 7 | 8 | Final |
| (Hokkaido) Kohsuke Hirata | 0 | 1 | 0 | 3 | 4 | X | X | X | 8 |
| (South Korea) Kim Chang-min 🔨 | 0 | 0 | 1 | 0 | 0 | X | X | X | 1 |

| Sheet C | 1 | 2 | 3 | 4 | 5 | 6 | 7 | 8 | Final |
| (Canada) Brad Gushue | 0 | 2 | 1 | 2 | 0 | 0 | 2 | X | 7 |
| (Nagano Prefecture) Yusuke Morozumi 🔨 | 2 | 0 | 0 | 0 | 2 | 0 | 0 | X | 4 |

=== Playoffs ===
Semifinals
A1 | (Canada) Brad Gushue | 6
B2 | (Sweden) Niklas Edin | 4
B1 | (Hokkaido) Hayato Sato | 5
A2 | (Nagano Prefecture) Yusuke Morozumi | 2

Final
A1 | (Canada) Brad Gushue | 7
B1 | (Hokkaido) Hayato Sato | 1
Bronze medal game
B2 | (Sweden) Niklas Edin | 9
A2 | (Nagano Prefecture) Yusuke Morozumi | 3

==== Semifinals ====
Saturday, December 2, 5:00 pm

| Sheet E | 1 | 2 | 3 | 4 | 5 | 6 | 7 | 8 | Final |
| (Hokkaido) Hayato Sato 🔨 | 0 | 2 | 1 | 1 | 0 | 1 | 0 | X | 5 |
| (Nagano Prefecture) Yusuke Morozumi | 0 | 0 | 0 | 0 | 1 | 0 | 1 | X | 2 |

| Sheet F | 1 | 2 | 3 | 4 | 5 | 6 | 7 | 8 | Final |
| (Canada) Brad Gushue | 0 | 1 | 0 | 0 | 2 | 0 | 0 | 3 | 6 |
| (Sweden) Niklas Edin 🔨 | 2 | 0 | 1 | 0 | 0 | 1 | 0 | 0 | 4 |

==== Third place game ====
Sunday, December 3, 9:00 am

| Sheet C | 1 | 2 | 3 | 4 | 5 | 6 | 7 | 8 | Final |
| (Sweden) Niklas Edin 🔨 | 1 | 0 | 3 | 0 | 3 | 2 | X | X | 9 |
| (Nagano Prefecture) Yusuke Morozumi | 0 | 1 | 0 | 2 | 0 | 0 | X | X | 3 |

==== Final ====
Sunday, December 3, 1:00 pm

| Sheet C | 1 | 2 | 3 | 4 | 5 | 6 | 7 | 8 | Final |
| (Canada) Brad Gushue 🔨 | 0 | 0 | 1 | 2 | 0 | 2 | 2 | X | 7 |
| (Hokkaido) Hayato Sato | 0 | 0 | 0 | 0 | 1 | 0 | 0 | X | 1 |

== Women ==
=== Teams ===
The teams are listed as follows:

| Skip | Third | Second | Lead | Alternate | Locale |
|---|---|---|---|---|---|
| Jennifer Jones | Karlee Burgess | Emily Zacharias | Lauren Lenentine | | Winnipeg, Manitoba, Canada |
| Kim Eun-jung | Kim Kyeong-ae | Kim Cho-hi | Kim Seon-yeong | Kim Yeong-mi | Gangneung, South Korea |
| Ikue Kitazawa | Seina Nakajima | Ami Enami | Minori Suzuki | Hasumi Ishigooka | (Nagano Prefecture) Nagano, Japan |
| Kaitlyn Lawes | Selena Njegovan | Jocelyn Peterman | Kristin MacCuish | | Winnipeg, Manitoba, Canada |
| Park You-been | Lee Eun-chae | Yang Seung-hee | Kim Ji-yoon | | Seoul, South Korea |
| Honoka Sasaki | Mari Motohashi | Miki Hayashi | Mayumi Saito | Yako Matsuzawa | (Hokkaido) Kitami, Japan |
| Miyu Ueno | Asuka Kanai | Junko Nishimuro | Yui Ueno | Mone Ryokawa | (Nagano Prefecture) Karuizawa, Japan |
| Yuna Kotani (Note: As skip Sayaka Yoshimura was on maternity leave, the rest of the team moved up the lineup a position.) | Kaho Onodera | Anna Ohmiya | Mina Kobayashi | | (Hokkaido) Sapporo, Japan |

=== Round robin standings ===
Final Round Robin Standings

Key
| Teams to Playoffs |

| Pool A | W | L | PF | PA | DSC |
|---|---|---|---|---|---|
| (South Korea) Kim Eun-jung | 3 | 0 | 25 | 7 | 72.47 |
| (Nagano Prefecture) Ikue Kitazawa | 2 | 1 | 21 | 21 | 63.43 |
| (Hokkaido) Honoka Sasaki | 1 | 2 | 16 | 27 | 82.35 |
| (Canada) Jennifer Jones | 0 | 3 | 15 | 22 | 31.70 |

| Pool B | W | L | PF | PA | DSC |
|---|---|---|---|---|---|
| (Canada) Kaitlyn Lawes | 3 | 0 | 19 | 10 | 49.32 |
| (Hokkaido) Team Yoshimura | 2 | 1 | 19 | 13 | 59.88 |
| (Nagano Prefecture) Miyu Ueno | 1 | 2 | 15 | 14 | 41.28 |
| (South Korea) Park You-been | 0 | 3 | 7 | 23 | 98.52 |

=== Round robin results ===
All draw times are listed in Japan Standard Time (UTC+09:00).

==== Draw 1 ====
Friday, December 1, 9:00 am

| Sheet B | 1 | 2 | 3 | 4 | 5 | 6 | 7 | 8 | Final |
| (Canada) Kaitlyn Lawes 🔨 | 3 | 0 | 0 | 0 | 1 | 0 | 0 | 2 | 6 |
| (Nagano Prefecture) Miyu Ueno | 0 | 1 | 1 | 1 | 0 | 1 | 1 | 0 | 5 |

| Sheet E | 1 | 2 | 3 | 4 | 5 | 6 | 7 | 8 | Final |
| (South Korea) Kim Eun-jung 🔨 | 0 | 2 | 0 | 0 | 4 | 5 | X | X | 11 |
| (Hokkaido) Honoka Sasaki | 0 | 0 | 0 | 2 | 0 | 0 | X | X | 2 |

==== Draw 2 ====
Friday, December 1, 1:00 pm

| Sheet A | 1 | 2 | 3 | 4 | 5 | 6 | 7 | 8 | Final |
| (Hokkaido) Team Yoshimura 🔨 | 0 | 4 | 0 | 2 | 0 | 0 | 3 | X | 9 |
| (South Korea) Park You-been | 0 | 0 | 1 | 0 | 3 | 0 | 0 | X | 4 |

| Sheet C | 1 | 2 | 3 | 4 | 5 | 6 | 7 | 8 | Final |
| (South Korea) Kim Eun-jung 🔨 | 3 | 1 | 1 | 0 | 3 | 0 | X | X | 8 |
| (Nagano Prefecture) Ikue Kitazawa | 0 | 0 | 0 | 1 | 0 | 1 | X | X | 2 |

| Sheet F | 1 | 2 | 3 | 4 | 5 | 6 | 7 | 8 | 9 | Final |
| (Hokkaido) Honoka Sasaki 🔨 | 2 | 0 | 0 | 2 | 0 | 1 | 0 | 1 | 1 | 7 |
| (Canada) Jennifer Jones | 0 | 1 | 1 | 0 | 2 | 0 | 2 | 0 | 0 | 6 |

==== Draw 3 ====
Friday, December 1, 5:00 pm

| Sheet B | 1 | 2 | 3 | 4 | 5 | 6 | 7 | 8 | 9 | Final |
| (Canada) Jennifer Jones 🔨 | 3 | 0 | 2 | 0 | 0 | 1 | 0 | 0 | 0 | 6 |
| (Nagano Prefecture) Ikue Kitazawa | 0 | 1 | 0 | 3 | 1 | 0 | 0 | 1 | 3 | 9 |

| Sheet C | 1 | 2 | 3 | 4 | 5 | 6 | 7 | 8 | Final |
| (Canada) Kaitlyn Lawes | 1 | 0 | 1 | 0 | 0 | 2 | 0 | 2 | 6 |
| (Hokkaido) Team Yoshimura 🔨 | 0 | 1 | 0 | 1 | 1 | 0 | 1 | 0 | 4 |

| Sheet F | 1 | 2 | 3 | 4 | 5 | 6 | 7 | 8 | Final |
| (Nagano Prefecture) Miyu Ueno | 0 | 0 | 1 | 2 | 2 | 0 | 2 | X | 7 |
| (South Korea) Park You-been 🔨 | 0 | 1 | 0 | 0 | 0 | 1 | 0 | X | 2 |

==== Draw 4 ====
Saturday, December 2, 9:00 am

| Sheet C | 1 | 2 | 3 | 4 | 5 | 6 | 7 | 8 | Final |
| (Canada) Jennifer Jones 🔨 | 0 | 0 | 1 | 0 | 1 | 1 | 0 | X | 3 |
| (South Korea) Kim Eun-jung | 0 | 2 | 0 | 2 | 0 | 0 | 2 | X | 6 |

| Sheet E | 1 | 2 | 3 | 4 | 5 | 6 | 7 | 8 | 9 | Final |
| (Nagano Prefecture) Ikue Kitazawa | 0 | 1 | 0 | 0 | 2 | 0 | 3 | 1 | 3 | 10 |
| (Hokkaido) Honoka Sasaki 🔨 | 3 | 0 | 1 | 1 | 0 | 2 | 0 | 0 | 0 | 7 |

==== Draw 5 ====
Saturday, December 2, 1:00 pm

| Sheet E | 1 | 2 | 3 | 4 | 5 | 6 | 7 | 8 | Final |
| (Hokkaido) Team Yoshimura | 0 | 0 | 4 | 0 | 1 | 1 | 0 | X | 6 |
| (Nagano Prefecture) Miyu Ueno 🔨 | 0 | 1 | 0 | 1 | 0 | 0 | 1 | X | 3 |

| Sheet F | 1 | 2 | 3 | 4 | 5 | 6 | 7 | 8 | Final |
| (South Korea) Park You-been | 0 | 0 | 1 | 0 | 0 | 0 | X | X | 1 |
| (Canada) Kaitlyn Lawes 🔨 | 2 | 0 | 0 | 3 | 1 | 1 | X | X | 7 |

=== Playoffs ===
Semifinals
A1 | (South Korea) Kim Eun-jung | 6
B2 | (Hokkaido) Team Yoshimura | 2
B1 | (Canada) Kaitlyn Lawes | 2
A2 | (Nagano Prefecture) Ikue Kitazawa | 7

Final
A1 | (South Korea) Kim Eun-jung | 6
A2 | (Nagano Prefecture) Ikue Kitazawa | 7
Bronze medal game
B2 | (Hokkaido) Team Yoshimura | 4
B1 | (Canada) Kaitlyn Lawes | 7

==== Semifinals ====
Saturday, December 2, 5:00 pm

| Sheet B | 1 | 2 | 3 | 4 | 5 | 6 | 7 | 8 | Final |
| (South Korea) Kim Eun-jung 🔨 | 0 | 0 | 2 | 1 | 0 | 0 | 3 | X | 6 |
| (Hokkaido) Team Yoshimura | 0 | 1 | 0 | 0 | 1 | 0 | 0 | X | 2 |

| Sheet C | 1 | 2 | 3 | 4 | 5 | 6 | 7 | 8 | Final |
| (Canada) Kaitlyn Lawes 🔨 | 0 | 1 | 0 | 0 | 1 | 0 | 0 | X | 2 |
| (Nagano Prefecture) Ikue Kitazawa | 1 | 0 | 1 | 1 | 0 | 3 | 1 | X | 7 |

==== Third place game ====
Sunday, December 3, 9:00 am

| Sheet E | 1 | 2 | 3 | 4 | 5 | 6 | 7 | 8 | Final |
| (Hokkaido) Team Yoshimura | 0 | 2 | 0 | 0 | 1 | 0 | 1 | X | 4 |
| (Canada) Kaitlyn Lawes 🔨 | 1 | 0 | 2 | 2 | 0 | 2 | 0 | X | 7 |

==== Final ====
Sunday, December 3, 1:00 pm

| Sheet E | 1 | 2 | 3 | 4 | 5 | 6 | 7 | 8 | Final |
| (South Korea) Kim Eun-jung 🔨 | 0 | 0 | 2 | 0 | 2 | 0 | 2 | 0 | 6 |
| (Nagano Prefecture) Ikue Kitazawa | 1 | 1 | 0 | 3 | 0 | 1 | 0 | 1 | 7 |
