= 2022 Karuizawa International Curling Championships =

- Host city: Karuizawa, Japan
- Arena: Karuizawa Ice Park
- Dates: December 16–18
- Men's winner: (Japan) Team Yanagisawa
- Curling club: Karuizawa CC, Karuizawa, Nagano
- Skip: Riku Yanagisawa
- Third: Tsuyoshi Yamaguchi
- Second: Takeru Yamamoto
- Lead: Satoshi Koizumi
- Alternate: Konosuke Takahashi
- Coach: Yuji Nishimuro
- Finalist: (Japan) Yusuke Morozumi
- Women's winner: (South Korea) Team Kim
- Curling club: Gangneung CC, Gangneung
- Skip: Kim Eun-jung
- Third: Kim Kyeong-ae
- Second: Kim Cho-hi
- Lead: Kim Seon-yeong
- Alternate: Kim Yeong-mi
- Coach: Lim Myung-sup
- Finalist: (Canada) Kerri Einarson

The 2022 Karuizawa International Curling Championships were held from December 16 to 18 at the Karuizawa Ice Park in Karuizawa, Nagano, Japan. The total purse for the event was ¥ 1,500,000 on both the men's and women's sides. It was the first time the event has been held since 2019 due to the COVID-19 pandemic cancelling both the 2020 and 2021 editions.

== Men ==
=== Teams ===
The teams are listed as follows:

Skip	Third	Second	Lead	Alternate	Locale
Kohsuke Hirata	Shingo Usui	Ryota Meguro	Yoshiya Miura	Kosuke Aita	Kitami, Japan
Hiroyuki Honda	Tomohiro Akita	Ryuta Numabe	Motohiro Goto	Ryu Yamamura	Kitami, Japan
Jeong Byeong-jin	Lee Jeong-jae	Kim Min-woo	Kim Tae-hwan		Seoul, South Korea
Kim Soo-hyuk (Fourth)	Kim Chang-min (Skip)	Jeon Jae-ik	Kim Hak-kyun	Seong Se-hyeon	Uiseong, South Korea
Yusuke Morozumi	Yuta Matsumura	Ryotaro Shukuya	Kosuke Morozumi	Masaki Iwai	Karuizawa, Japan
Go Aoki (Fourth)	Hayato Sato (Skip)	Kouki Ogiwara	Kazushi Nino	Ayato Sasaki	Sapporo, Japan
John Shuster	Chris Plys	Matt Hamilton	John Landsteiner	Colin Hufman	(United States) Duluth, Minnesota
Riku Yanagisawa	Tsuyoshi Yamaguchi	Takeru Yamamoto	Satoshi Koizumi	Konosuke Takahashi	Karuizawa, Japan

=== Round-robin standings ===
Final round-robin standings

Key
Teams to Playoffs

Pool A	W	L	PF	PA	DSC
(United States) John Shuster	3	0	23	8	40.27
(Japan) Yusuke Morozumi	2	1	20	12	36.20
(South Korea) Jeong Byeong-jin	1	2	18	16	76.90
(Japan) Hiroyuki Honda	0	3	4	29	83.65

Pool B	W	L	PF	PA	DSC
(Japan) Kohsuke Hirata	2	1	21	20	53.22
(Japan) Riku Yanagisawa	2	1	21	12	61.05
(Japan) Hayato Sato	2	1	17	16	109.45
(South Korea) Kim Chang-min	0	3	13	24	96.13

=== Round-robin results ===
All draw times are listed in Japan Standard Time (UTC+09:00).

==== Draw 1 ====
Friday, December 16, 9:00 am

Sheet A	1	2	3	4	5	6	7	8	Final
(Japan) Kohsuke Hirata	1	0	1	0	0	1	3	0	6
(Japan) Hayato Sato	0	2	0	2	1	0	0	2	7

Sheet E	1	2	3	4	5	6	7	8	Final
(Japan) Riku Yanagisawa	2	0	2	0	2	3	X	X	9
(South Korea) Kim Chang-min	0	1	0	1	0	0	X	X	2

==== Draw 2 ====
Friday, December 16, 1:30 pm

Sheet A	1	2	3	4	5	6	7	8	Final
(Japan) Yusuke Morozumi	2	2	0	2	1	2	X	X	9
(Japan) Hiroyuki Honda	0	0	1	0	0	0	X	X	1

Sheet B	1	2	3	4	5	6	7	8	Final
(South Korea) Jeong Byeong-jin	0	2	0	1	0	0	1	X	4
(United States) John Shuster	0	0	2	0	3	1	0	X	6

==== Draw 3 ====
Friday, December 16, 6:00 pm

Sheet A	1	2	3	4	5	6	7	8	9	Final
(South Korea) Kim Chang-min	2	0	0	2	1	0	1	0	0	6
(Japan) Kohsuke Hirata	0	1	1	0	0	2	0	2	1	7

Sheet B	1	2	3	4	5	6	7	8	Final
(Japan) Hayato Sato	0	0	0	1	0	0	1	X	2
(Japan) Riku Yanagisawa	0	2	0	0	2	1	0	X	5

Sheet C	1	2	3	4	5	6	7	8	Final
(United States) John Shuster	2	2	0	0	3	3	X	X	10
(Japan) Hiroyuki Honda	0	0	0	1	0	0	X	X	1

Sheet D	1	2	3	4	5	6	7	8	Final
(South Korea) Jeong Byeong-jin	1	1	2	0	0	0	0	X	4
(Japan) Yusuke Morozumi	0	0	0	4	1	1	2	X	8

==== Draw 4 ====
Saturday, December 17, 9:00 am

Sheet B	1	2	3	4	5	6	7	8	Final
(Japan) Hiroyuki Honda	0	1	0	1	0	X	X	X	2
(South Korea) Jeong Byeong-jin	2	0	5	0	3	X	X	X	10

Sheet D	1	2	3	4	5	6	7	8	Final
(South Korea) Kim Chang-min	2	1	0	0	1	0	1	X	5
(Japan) Hayato Sato	0	0	0	4	0	4	0	X	8

==== Draw 5 ====
Saturday, December 17, 1:30 pm

Sheet C	1	2	3	4	5	6	7	8	9	Final
(Japan) Riku Yanagisawa	1	0	2	0	1	2	0	1	0	7
(Japan) Kohsuke Hirata	0	2	0	3	0	0	2	0	1	8

Sheet E	1	2	3	4	5	6	7	8	Final
(United States) John Shuster	1	1	1	0	4	0	X	X	7
(Japan) Yusuke Morozumi	0	0	0	2	0	1	X	X	3

=== Playoffs ===
Semifinals
A1	(United States) John Shuster	3
B2	(Japan) Riku Yanagisawa	10
B1	(Japan) Kohsuke Hirata	4
A2	(Japan) Yusuke Morozumi	5

Final
B2	(Japan) Riku Yanagisawa	5
A2	(Japan) Yusuke Morozumi	4
Bronze medal game
A1	(United States) John Shuster	7
B1	(Japan) Kohsuke Hirata	3

==== Semifinals ====
Saturday, December 17, 6:00 pm

Sheet B	1	2	3	4	5	6	7	8	Final
(Japan) Kohsuke Hirata	0	0	2	1	0	0	1	0	4
(Japan) Yusuke Morozumi	1	1	0	0	1	1	0	1	5

Sheet D	1	2	3	4	5	6	7	8	Final
(United States) John Shuster	0	1	0	1	0	1	0	X	3
(Japan) Riku Yanagisawa	2	0	2	0	2	0	4	X	10

==== Third place game ====
Sunday, December 18, 9:00 am

Sheet C	1	2	3	4	5	6	7	8	Final
(United States) John Shuster	0	2	0	2	0	2	1	X	7
(Japan) Kohsuke Hirata	1	0	1	0	1	0	0	X	3

==== Final ====
Sunday, December 18, 1:30 pm

Sheet C	1	2	3	4	5	6	7	8	Final
(Japan) Riku Yanagisawa	1	0	0	0	1	0	2	1	5
(Japan) Yusuke Morozumi	0	1	1	0	0	2	0	0	4

== Women ==
=== Teams ===
The teams are listed as follows:

Skip	Third	Second	Lead	Alternate	Locale
Kerri Einarson	Val Sweeting	Shannon Birchard	Briane Harris		Gimli, Manitoba, Canada
Satsuki Fujisawa	Chinami Yoshida	Yumi Suzuki	Yurika Yoshida		Kitami, Japan
Asuka Kanai	Ami Enami	Junko Nishimuro	Mone Ryokawa		Karuizawa, Japan
Kim Eun-jung	Kim Kyeong-ae	Kim Cho-hi	Kim Seon-yeong	Kim Yeong-mi	Gangneung, South Korea
Ikue Kitazawa	Seina Nakajima	Minori Suzuki	Hasumi Ishigooka	Chiaki Matsumura	Nagano, Japan
Honoka Sasaki	Mari Motohashi	Miki Hayashi	Ayuna Aoki	Mayumi Saito	Kitami, Japan
Momoha Tabata	Miku Nihira	Mikoto Nakajima	Ayami Ito		Sapporo, Japan
Sayaka Yoshimura	Yuna Kotani	Kaho Onodera	Anna Ohmiya	Yumie Funayama	Sapporo, Japan

=== Round-robin standings ===
Final round-robin standings

Key
Teams to Playoffs

Pool A	W	L	PF	PA	DSC
(Canada) Kerri Einarson	2	1	20	17	97.55
(Japan) Sayaka Yoshimura	2	1	18	13	86.27
(Japan) Honoka Sasaki	1	2	19	22	35.33
(Japan) Ikue Kitazawa	1	2	18	23	70.37

Pool B	W	L	PF	PA	DSC
(South Korea) Kim Eun-jung	2	1	18	13	39.05
(Japan) Satsuki Fujisawa	2	1	17	12	63.23
(Japan) Momoha Tabata	2	1	16	16	80.17
(Japan) Asuka Kanai	0	3	13	23	98.15

=== Round-robin results ===
All draw times are listed in Japan Standard Time (UTC+09:00).

==== Draw 1 ====
Friday, December 16, 9:00 am

Sheet B	1	2	3	4	5	6	7	8	Final
(Japan) Sayaka Yoshimura	0	2	0	0	3	1	0	X	6
(Japan) Honoka Sasaki	0	0	0	2	0	0	1	X	3

Sheet C	1	2	3	4	5	6	7	8	9	Final
(Canada) Kerri Einarson	0	0	0	3	0	0	1	1	0	5
(Japan) Ikue Kitazawa	1	0	1	0	2	1	0	0	2	7

Player percentages
(Canada) Team Einarson		(Japan) Team Kitazawa	
Briane Harris	74%	Hasumi Ishigooka	83%
Shannon Birchard	64%	Minori Suzuki	65%
Val Sweeting	82%	Seina Nakajima	67%
Kerri Einarson	59%	Ikue Kitazawa	85%
Total	70%	Total	75%

Sheet D	1	2	3	4	5	6	7	8	Final
(Japan) Satsuki Fujisawa	0	1	1	1	0	0	2	1	6
(Japan) Asuka Kanai	1	0	0	0	1	1	0	0	3

==== Draw 2 ====
Friday, December 16, 1:30 pm

Sheet C	1	2	3	4	5	6	7	8	Final
(South Korea) Kim Eun-jung	0	1	0	2	0	1	1	X	5
(Japan) Momoha Tabata	0	0	2	0	1	0	0	X	3

Sheet D	1	2	3	4	5	6	7	8	Final
(Japan) Sayaka Yoshimura	1	0	0	0	0	2	0	X	3
(Canada) Kerri Einarson	0	2	0	1	2	0	1	X	6

Player percentages
(Japan) Team Yoshimura		(Canada) Team Einarson	
Anna Ohmiya	78%	Briane Harris	80%
Kaho Onodera	83%	Shannon Birchard	81%
Yuna Kotani	66%	Val Sweeting	75%
Sayaka Yoshimura	68%	Kerri Einarson	80%
Total	74%	Total	79%

Sheet E	1	2	3	4	5	6	7	8	Final
(Japan) Ikue Kitazawa	0	3	0	2	0	2	0	0	7
(Japan) Honoka Sasaki	1	0	2	0	3	0	2	1	9

==== Draw 3 ====
Friday, December 16, 6:00 pm

Sheet E	1	2	3	4	5	6	7	8	Final
(Japan) Satsuki Fujisawa	0	1	1	0	3	1	0	X	6
(South Korea) Kim Eun-jung	0	0	0	2	0	0	1	X	3

Player percentages
(Japan) Team Fujisawa		(South Korea) Team Kim	
Yurika Yoshida	86%	Kim Seon-yeong	77%
Yumi Suzuki	81%	Kim Cho-hi	84%
Chinami Yoshida	88%	Kim Kyeong-ae	64%
Satsuki Fujisawa	97%	Kim Eun-jung	63%
Total	88%	Total	72%

==== Draw 4 ====
Saturday, December 17, 9:00 am

Sheet C	1	2	3	4	5	6	7	8	Final
(Japan) Asuka Kanai	0	1	0	1	0	0	3	1	6
(Japan) Momoha Tabata	2	0	3	0	1	1	0	0	7

Sheet E	1	2	3	4	5	6	7	8	Final
(Japan) Sayaka Yoshimura	0	1	1	1	0	3	3	X	9
(Japan) Ikue Kitazawa	2	0	0	0	2	0	0	X	4

==== Draw 5 ====
Saturday, December 17, 1:30 pm

Sheet A	1	2	3	4	5	6	7	8	9	Final
(Japan) Honoka Sasaki	2	2	0	0	2	0	0	1	0	7
(Canada) Kerri Einarson	0	0	2	2	0	1	2	0	2	9

Sheet B	1	2	3	4	5	6	7	8	9	Final
(Japan) Momoha Tabata	0	0	1	1	2	0	1	0	1	6
(Japan) Satsuki Fujisawa	1	0	0	0	0	3	0	1	0	5

Sheet D	1	2	3	4	5	6	7	8	Final
(South Korea) Kim Eun-jung	0	4	0	2	0	4	X	X	10
(Japan) Asuka Kanai	2	0	1	0	1	0	X	X	4

=== Playoffs ===
Semifinals
A1	(Canada) Kerri Einarson	4
B2	(Japan) Satsuki Fujisawa	3
B1	(South Korea) Kim Eun-jung	7
A2	(Japan) Sayaka Yoshimura	5

Final
A1	(Canada) Kerri Einarson	4
B1	(South Korea) Kim Eun-jung	5
Bronze medal game
B2	(Japan) Satsuki Fujisawa	4
A2	(Japan) Sayaka Yoshimura	7

==== Semifinals ====
Saturday, December 17, 6:00 pm

Sheet C	1	2	3	4	5	6	7	8	Final
(South Korea) Kim Eun-jung	0	0	1	0	2	3	0	1	7
(Japan) Sayaka Yoshimura	0	1	0	2	0	0	2	0	5

Sheet E	1	2	3	4	5	6	7	8	9	Final
(Canada) Kerri Einarson	0	1	0	1	0	0	1	0	1	4
(Japan) Satsuki Fujisawa	0	0	0	0	1	1	0	1	0	3

==== Third place game ====
Sunday, December 18, 9:00 am

Sheet D	1	2	3	4	5	6	7	8	Final
(Japan) Satsuki Fujisawa	1	0	2	1	0	0	0	0	4
(Japan) Sayaka Yoshimura	0	2	0	0	1	2	1	1	7

==== Final ====
Sunday, December 18, 6:00 pm

Sheet C	1	2	3	4	5	6	7	8	Final
(Canada) Kerri Einarson	0	1	0	0	0	2	0	1	4
(South Korea) Kim Eun-jung	0	0	3	1	0	0	1	0	5

Player percentages
(Canada) Team Einarson		(South Korea) Team Kim	
Briane Harris	84%	Kim Seon-yeong	92%
Shannon Birchard	86%	Kim Cho-hi	91%
Val Sweeting	84%	Kim Kyeong-ae	88%
Kerri Einarson	70%	Kim Eun-jung	86%
Total	81%	Total	89%
