= Kim Kyeong-ae (curler) =

South Korean curler (born 1994)

- Curler
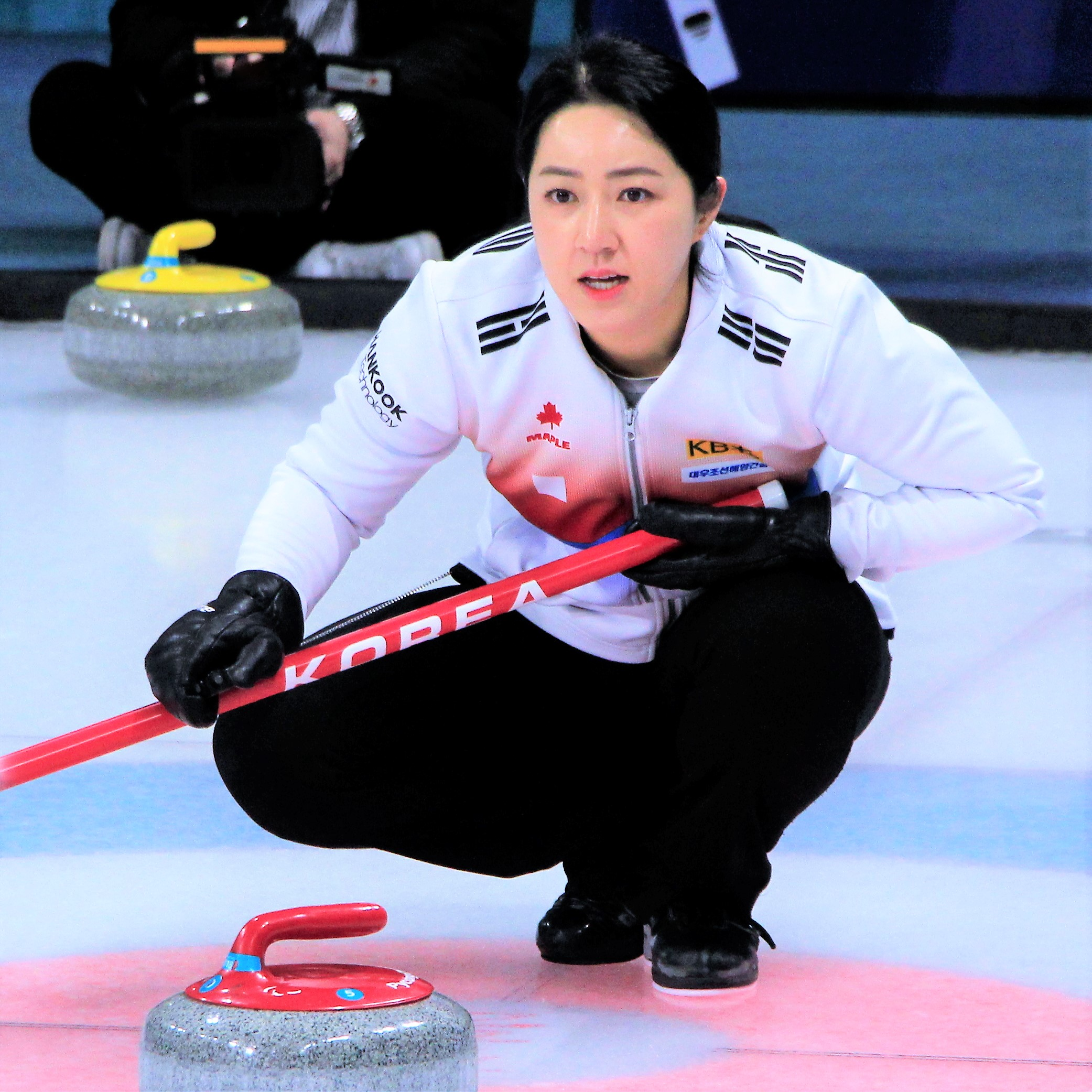
- Kim Kyeong-ae in 2022
- Born: January 21, 1994 (age 32); Uiseong, South Korea

Team
- Curling club: Jeonbuk CC, Jeonbuk
- Skip: Kim Kyeong-ae
- Third: Kim Min-seo
- Second: Shim Yu-jeong
- Lead: Kim Ji-soo

Curling career
- Member Association: South Korea
- World Championship: 4 (2017, 2018, 2021, 2022)
- World Mixed Doubles Championship: 1 (2025)
- Pacific-Asia Championship: 5 (2012, 2014, 2016, 2017, 2021)
- Olympic: 2 (2018, 2022)
- Other appearances: Asian Winter Games: 2 (2017, 2025)
Medal record
Women's curling
Representing South Korea
Olympic Games
Silver medal – second place	2018 Pyeongchang	Team
World Championships
Silver medal – second place	2022 Prince George
World Junior Championships
Silver medal – second place	2014 Flims
Asian Winter Games
Silver medal – second place	2017 Sapporo	Team
Silver medal – second place	2025 Harbin	Mixed doubles
Pacific-Asia Championships
Gold medal – first place	2016 Uiseong
Gold medal – first place	2017 Erina
Silver medal – second place	2014 Karuizawa
Silver medal – second place	2021 Almaty
Bronze medal – third place	2012 Naseby
Pacific-Asia Junior Championships
Gold medal – first place	2014 Harbin
Silver medal – second place	2010 Nayoro
Silver medal – second place	2011 Naseby
Silver medal – second place	2012 Jeonju
Bronze medal – third place	2013 Tokoro
Representing Uiseong
Korean Women's Championship
Gold medal – first place	2012 Uijeongbu
Gold medal – first place	2014 Chongju
Gold medal – first place	2016 Uiseong
Gold medal – first place	2017 Icheon
Gold medal – first place	2020 Gangneung
Silver medal – second place	2013 Chuncheon
Silver medal – second place	2018 Jincheon
Bronze medal – third place	2015 Icheon
Bronze medal – third place	2019 Gangneung
Representing Gangneung
Korean Women's Championship
Gold medal – first place	2021 Gangneung
Silver medal – second place	2023 Gangneung
Bronze medal – third place	2024 Uijeongbu
Representing Gangwon
Korean Mixed Doubles Championship
Gold medal – first place	2024 Jincheon

- Kim Kyeong-ae
- Hangul: 김경애
- Hanja: 金景愛
- RR: Gim Gyeongae
- MR: Kim Kyŏngae

Kim Kyeong-ae (born January 21, 1994), nicknamed "Steak", is a South Korean curler. She currently skips the Jeonbuk Province curling team. She was the longtime third on Team Kim Eun-jung that won silver medals at the 2018 Winter Olympics and 2022 World Women's Curling Championship.

== Career ==
=== Juniors ===
Kim played in five straight Pacific-Asia Junior Curling Championships for South Korea from 2010 to 2014. She played third for the team which was skipped by Kim Eun-jung from 2010 to 2012 and skipped the team in 2013 and 2014. She won silver medals at the event from 2010 to 2012 inclusive. In her first year as a skip, she led South Korea to a bronze medal, and in 2014 she won the event, picking up a gold medal for the team.

Kim skipped the South Korean team at the 2014 World Junior Curling Championships. She led her team of Kim Seon-yeong, Kim Ji-hyeon and Oh Eun-jin to a 7-2 round robin record, tied with Canada for first place. After losing the 1 vs. 2 game to Canada (skipped by Kelsey Rocque), Kim led her team to a semifinal win against Sweden before once again losing to Canada in a rematch in the gold medal final.

Kim has represented South Korea's Gyeongbuk Science College in two Winter Universiades, playing third for Kim Eun-jung at both the 2015 and 2017 Winter Universiades, finishing 5th and 6th respectively.

=== Women's ===
While still a junior curler, Kim first represented her country at the women's level at the 2012 Pacific-Asia Curling Championships, playing third for Kim Eun-jung, who she also played with in juniors. There, the team won a bronze medal. The team returned to the event in 2014, where they won a bronze medal. This would've qualified them for the 2015 World Championships, but the Worlds were held in Japan, which qualified over South Korea as hosts. The team would, however, win a gold medal at the 2016 Pacific-Asia Curling Championships, earning them the right to play in the 2017 World Women's Curling Championship in China, where they finished sixth. Also, in 2017, the team won a silver medal at the 2017 Asian Winter Games.

Team Kim won the 2017 South Korean championship, qualifying the team to represent South Korea on home ice at the 2018 Winter Olympics. The team began the 2017-18 curling season by winning the 2017 Pacific-Asia Curling Championships. As the host nation, the team received celebrity status in Korea as the "garlic girls", as their hometown of Uiseong is known for its garlic production. The team had an impressive run, making it to the gold medal final, where they lost to Sweden's Anna Hasselborg rink. The following month, the team played in the 2018 Ford World Women's Curling Championship, where they lost in the quarterfinals.

The garlic girls did not play much in the 2018–19 season amidst a coaching scandal, which involved the country's sport federation vice president verbally abusing the team. Kim skipped the team in the final event of the season, the 2019 WCT Arctic Cup because her skip Kim Eun-jung was preparing to give birth. The team finished with a 1–3 record, missing the playoffs.

Team Kim returned to the World Curling Tour for the 2019–20 season but with Kyeong-ae skipping. They qualified for the playoffs at the 2019 Cameron's Brewing Oakville Fall Classic, the 2019 Stu Sells Oakville Tankard and finished runner-up at the inaugural WCT Uiseong International Curling Cup. Kim Eun-jung rejoined the team at the 2019 Curlers Corner Autumn Gold Curling Classic, where she would throw second stones. They had a quarterfinal finish. Team Kim also had a quarterfinal finish the following week at the 2019 Canad Inns Women's Classic, where Kim Eun-jung returned to throwing skip stones. They made it to the final of the 2019 Changan Ford International Curling Elite and finished fourth at the 2019 China Open in December 2019. In the new year, they had a quarterfinal finish at the International Bernese Ladies Cup, and they won the Glynhill Ladies International. It would be the team's last event of the season as both the Players' Championship and the Champions Cup Grand Slam events were cancelled due to the COVID-19 pandemic.

The Kim rink began the abbreviated 2020–21 season by winning their national championship at the 2020 Korean Curling Championships. After finishing 6–0 through the round robin, her team defeated Kim Min-ji 6–5 in the 1 vs. 2 page playoff game and won 7–5 over Gim Un-chi in the championship final. Their win qualified them to represent Korea at the 2021 World Women's Curling Championship. The team had a slow start, losing their first four games before going 7–2 in their final nine games. Their 7–6 record placed them seventh after the round robin, not enough to qualify for the playoffs and the 2022 Winter Olympics. The team also changed home clubs during the season, switching from the Uiseong Curling Club to the Gangneung Curling Centre after their contract expired with the Gyeongsangbukdo Sports Council.

Team Kim began the 2021–22 season at the 2021 Korean Curling Championships in June, which also doubled as the selection event for the 2022 Winter Olympics in Beijing, China. Through the event, the team posted a strong 11–1 record, once again securing the national title. The team also won their next event, the 2021 Alberta Curling Series: Saville Shoot-Out in September, after an undefeated record. Elsewhere on tour, the team reached the semifinals of both the 2021 Sherwood Park Women's Curling Classic and the 2021 Masters Grand Slam event. In international play, Team Kim represented South Korea at the 2021 Pacific-Asia Curling Championships. The team finished the round robin with a 5–1 record, tied with Japan. Japan had a better draw shot challenge record, forcing Korea into a semifinal match against Kazakhstan. Team Kim beat Kazakhstan but lost to Japan in the gold medal game, settling for silver. Because they had failed to qualify for the Olympics at the 2021 World Championship, the team then had to play in the Olympic Qualification Event to qualify South Korea for the 2022 Winter Olympics. The team posted a 6–2 record through the round robin, putting them into the playoffs. There, they lost to Japan in their first game but rebounded to beat Latvia in their second, qualifying Korea for the Winter Games. At the Olympics, the team could not replicate their success from PyeongChang 2018 and finished the event in eighth with a 4–5 record. The team had much more success at the 2022 World Women's Curling Championship. They finished the round robin with a 9–3 record, in second place. This gave them a bye to the semifinals, where they beat the host Canadian team skipped by Kerri Einarson. This put them into the gold medal game where they played Switzerland, skipped by Silvana Tirinzoni. The team was not as successful against the Swiss, losing to them 7–6, settling for the silver medal, Korea's best-ever finish at the Worlds. A few weeks later, the team wrapped up their season at the 2022 Champions Cup, where they lost in a tiebreaker to Einarson.

In June 2022, at the 2022 Korean Curling Championships, Team Kim lost their spot as the national team. After a 5–1 record, the team lost both the semifinal and bronze medal game to Chuncheon City Hall and Jeonbuk Province respectively. It was their first time not reaching the podium in over a decade. They began their tour season at the 2022 Stu Sells Toronto Tankard where they lost in the semifinals to Team Tirinzoni. The next week, they played in the first Slam of the season, the 2022 National, where they went 1–3. After failing to qualify again at the 2022 Western Showdown, the team found success at the 2022 Tour Challenge as they qualified for the playoffs as the second seeds. They then lost to Gim Eun-ji in the quarterfinals. They also lost to Team Gim in the quarterfinals of their next event, the Stu Sells Brantford Nissan Classic after previously being undefeated. At the 2022 Masters, the team again missed the playoffs with a 1–3 record. They ended their season early at the 2022 Karuizawa International Curling Championships where they qualified for the playoffs with a 2–1 record. After beating Sayaka Yoshimura 7–5 in the semifinal, they won 5–4 over Kerri Einarson to secure the event title.

The following season, Team Kim finished second to Team Gim at the 2023 Korean Curling Championships, again not qualifying as the national team. Despite this, the team had one of their best tour seasons to date. After two quarterfinal and one semifinal finish, they won the 2023 Stu Sells Tankard, defeating Sayaka Yoshimura 6–5 in the final. They followed this up with a semifinal finish at the 2023 Players Open which included a quarterfinal win against world champions Silvana Tirinzoni. In October, the team won six straight games to claim the 2023 Tour Challenge Tier 2 title. They won their third event the following month in Uiseong, defeating Team Gim in the final of the Uiseong Korean Cup. After losing the final of the 2023 Karuizawa International to Ikue Kitazawa, Team Kim bounced back immediately with an undefeated run at the 2023 Western Showdown. After a 4–0 round robin record, they beat Gim, Isabella Wranå and Jolene Campbell in the quarterfinals, semifinals and final respectively. They then played their first Tier 1 Slam event of the year, the 2023 Masters, where they lost in a tiebreaker to Tabitha Peterson. In the new year, they did qualify at the 2024 Canadian Open before a loss to Tirinzoni in the quarterfinals. At the 2024 International Bernese Ladies Cup, the team made it to another final before losing to rivals Team Gim. They finished their season at the 2024 Players' Championship with another quarterfinal loss to Tirinzoni. After beginning the season in twenty-seventh place, Team Kim ranked seventh at the end of the 2023–24 season.

After having one of their best seasons to date, Team Kim continued to climb the rankings, entering the top four in the world for the first time and never missing the playoffs during the 2024–25 season. Things did not start great, however, as they again missed out on being the national team after a bronze medal finish at the 2024 Korean Curling Championships. Despite this, they quickly turned things around to begin the tour season, reaching the final of the 2024 KW Fall Classic and defending their title at the 2024 Stu Sells Toronto Tankard. They later reached another final at the DeKalb Superspiel while also picking up another title at their own Gangneung Invitational. Where the team excelled though was in Grand Slam play as they reached the playoffs in all five events, progressing to the semifinals in the last four. Although, they never managed to qualify for any finals, losing three times to Rachel Homan and once to Silvana Tirinzoni, the top two ranked teams in the world.

=== Mixed doubles ===
Kim Kyeong-ae competed in the 2024 Korean Mixed Doubles Curling Championship with partner Seong Ji-hoon, her first time competing in the event. There, the pair swept the competition, finishing the event with a 10–2 record and claiming the gold medal. This qualified them as the national mixed doubles team for the 2024–25 season, allowing them to represent the country at the 2025 Asian Winter Games and the 2025 World Mixed Doubles Curling Championship. At the Asian Winter Games, they advanced to the final where they were beaten by Japan's Tori Koana and Go Aoki, earning silver. At Worlds, they found less success, struggling early before finishing the week at 4–5.

== Personal life ==
Her older sister Kim Yeong-mi is the alternate on her team.

== Grand Slam record ==
Key
C	Champion
F	Lost in Final
SF	Lost in Semifinal
QF	Lost in Quarterfinals
R16	Lost in the round of 16
Q	Did not advance to playoffs
T2	Played in Tier 2 event
DNP	Did not participate in event
N/A	Not a Grand Slam event that season

Event	2015–16	2016–17	2017–18	2018–19	2019–20	2020–21	2021–22	2022–23	2023–24	2024–25	2025–26	2026–27
Invitational	SF	DNP	T2	DNP	DNP	N/A	N/A	QF	T2	QF	Q	F
Masters	Q	QF	DNP	DNP	DNP	N/A	SF	Q	Q	DNP	QF	DNP
National	Q	Q	DNP	DNP	DNP	N/A	DNP	Q	DNP	SF	DNP	Q
Open	Q	DNP	SF	DNP	DNP	N/A	N/A	DNP	QF	SF	Q	
Players'	DNP	DNP	Q	DNP	N/A	DNP	DNP	DNP	QF	SF	DNP	
Champions Cup	DNP	DNP	DNP	DNP	N/A	DNP	Q	DNP	N/A	N/A	N/A	N/A

=== Former events ===
Event	2013–14	2014–15
Autumn Gold	DNP	Q
Colonial Square	QF	DNP
