= 2024 Korean Curling Championships =

2024 KB Financial Korean Curling Championships
- Host city: Uijeongbu, South Korea
- Arena: Uijeongbu Curling Stadium
- Dates: June 9–17
- Men's winner: Uiseong-gun Office
- Curling club: Uiseong CC, Uiseong
- Skip: Lee Jae-beom
- Third: Kim Hyo-jun
- Second: Pyo Jeong-min
- Lead: Kim Eun-bin
- Alternate: Kim Jin-hun
- Coach: Lee Dong-keun
- Finalist: Gangwon Province (Park)
- Women's winner: Gyeonggi Province
- Curling club: Uijeongbu CC, Uijeongbu
- Skip: Gim Eun-ji
- Third: Kim Min-ji
- Second: Kim Su-ji
- Lead: Seol Ye-eun
- Alternate: Seol Ye-ji
- Coach: Shin Dong-ho
- Finalist: Chuncheon City Hall (Ha)

The 2024 Korean Curling Championships, (branded as the 2024 KB Financial Korean Curling Championships), Korea's national curling championships, were held from June 9 to 17 at the Uijeongbu Curling Stadium in Uijeongbu, South Korea. The winning teams on both the men's and women's sides became the Korean National Teams for the 2024–25 curling season. They will represent Korea at the 2024 Pan Continental Curling Championships, the 2025 Asian Winter Games and later the 2025 World Curling Championships. Both the men's and women's events were played in a round robin format which qualified four teams for the page playoffs.

The men's reigning champions Gangwon Province (skipped by Park Jong-duk) entered the championship as the top ranked team. During the 2023–24 season, the rink led Korea to a silver medal finish at the 2023 Pan Continental Curling Championships and a twelfth-place finish at the 2024 World Men's Curling Championship. On tour, they reached one final at the 2023 Hokkaido Bank Curling Classic. 2022 champions Seoul City Hall (Jeong Byeong-jin) and 2021 champions Gyeongbuk Sports Council (Kim Soo-hyuk) rounded out the top three men's teams prior to the event.

2023 women's champions Gyeonggi Province (skipped by Gim Eun-ji) had a historic 2023–24 season as they became the first Korean team to rank inside the top three in the world. During their run, the team won gold at the 2023 Pan Continental Championships and went on to claim bronze at the 2024 World Women's Curling Championship. They also won Korea's first Grand Slam of Curling title at the 2023 National and also won the 2023 Curlers Corner Autumn Gold Curling Classic and the 2024 International Bernese Ladies Cup on tour. Rounding out the pre-event favorites on the women's side were Gangneung City Hall (Kim Eun-jung) and Chuncheon City Hall (Ha Seung-youn), the 2021 and 2022 national champions respectively.

== Medalists ==
	Gold	Silver	Bronze
Men	Uiseong-gun Office; Lee Jae-beom; Kim Hyo-jun; Pyo Jeong-min; Kim Eun-bin; Kim Jin-hun	Gangwon Province; Park Jong-duk; Jeong Yeong-seok; Oh Seung-hoon; Lee Ki-bok; Seong Ji-hoon	Gyeongbuk Sports Council; Kim Soo-hyuk; Kim Chang-min; Yoo Min-hyeon; Kim Hak-kyun; Jeon Jae-ik
Women	Gyeonggi Province; Gim Eun-ji; Kim Min-ji; Kim Su-ji; Seol Ye-eun; Seol Ye-ji	Chuncheon City Hall; Ha Seung-youn; Kim Hye-rin; Yang Tae-i; Kim Su-jin; Park Seo-jin	Gangneung City Hall; Kim Eun-jung; Kim Kyeong-ae; Kim Cho-hi; Kim Seon-yeong; Kim Yeong-mi

== Men ==
=== Teams ===
The teams are listed as follows:

Team	Skip	Third	Second	Lead	Alternate	Locale
Bongmyeong High School	Yoon Ji-hoo	Yeon Seung-ho	Oh Seung-joon	Yoon Sang-don	Kim Min-sung	Cheongju
Chungnam	Yoo Jing-han	Jang Moon-ik	Lee Sung-kon	Seol Yeong-won	Kim Sang-hyeon	Chungnam
Gangwon Province	Park Jong-duk	Jeong Yeong-seok	Oh Seung-hoon	Lee Ki-bok	Seong Ji-hoon	Gangwon
Gyeongbuk Sports Council	Kim Soo-hyuk	Kim Chang-min	Yoo Min-hyeon	Kim Hak-kyun	Jeon Jae-ik	Uiseong
Seoul City Hall	Jeong Byeong-jin	Lee Jeong-jae	Kim Min-woo	Kim Jeong-min		Seoul
Uijeongbu High School	Park Gun-woo	Kim Ye-chan	Go Do-hyeon	Park Hyo-ik		Uijeongbu
Uiseong-gun Office	Lee Jae-beom	Kim Hyo-jun	Pyo Jeong-min	Kim Eun-bin	Kim Jin-hun	Uiseong

=== Round robin standings ===
Final Round Robin Standings

Key
Teams to Playoffs

Team	Skip	W	L	W–L	PF	PA	EW	EL	BE	SE	DSC
Gangwon Province	Park Jong-duk	6	0	–	45	16	26	14	10	10	20.00
Gyeongbuk Sports Council	Kim Soo-hyuk	4	2	1–1	52	25	22	16	5	8	15.00
Uiseong-gun Office	Lee Jae-beom	4	2	1–1	52	31	25	20	3	5	20.70
Seoul City Hall	Jeong Byeong-jin	4	2	1–1	60	26	22	18	3	11	32.40
Uijeongbu High School	Park Gun-woo	2	4	–	35	42	23	23	4	7	50.20
Bongmyeong High School	Yoon Ji-hoo	1	5	–	28	78	18	29	0	5	84.40
Chungnam	Yoo Jing-han	0	6	–	17	71	14	30	2	1	117.80

=== Round robin results ===
All draws are listed in Korea Standard Time (UTC+09:00).

==== Draw 1 ====
Sunday, June 9, 7:00 pm

Sheet A	1	2	3	4	5	6	7	8	9	10	Final
Uijeongbu High School (G. Park) 🔨	0	0	0	1	0	0	0	1	0	X	2
Gangwon Province (J. Park)	0	0	0	0	2	1	2	0	2	X	7

Sheet D	1	2	3	4	5	6	7	8	9	10	Final
Gyeongbuk Sports Council (Kim) 🔨	0	4	6	2	3	4	X	X	X	X	19
Bongmyeong High School (Yoon)	0	0	0	0	0	0	X	X	X	X	0

Sheet E	1	2	3	4	5	6	7	8	9	10	Final
Seoul City Hall (Jeong) 🔨	4	3	4	2	6	0	0	X	X	X	19
Chungnam (Yoo)	0	0	0	0	0	1	1	X	X	X	2

==== Draw 3 ====
Monday, June 10, 5:00 pm

Sheet B	1	2	3	4	5	6	7	8	9	10	Final
Chungnam (Yoo)	0	0	3	0	0	1	0	1	X	X	5
Bongmyeong High School (Yoon) 🔨	2	2	0	1	1	0	4	0	X	X	10

Sheet D	1	2	3	4	5	6	7	8	9	10	Final
Uijeongbu High School (G. Park)	0	1	0	1	0	1	0	1	0	X	4
Uiseong-gun Office (Lee) 🔨	0	0	2	0	2	0	2	0	3	X	9

Sheet E	1	2	3	4	5	6	7	8	9	10	Final
Gyeongbuk Sports Council (Kim)	0	1	0	0	0	1	0	0	0	1	3
Gangwon Province (J. Park) 🔨	2	0	0	0	1	0	2	1	0	0	6

==== Draw 5 ====
Tuesday, June 11, 2:00 pm

Sheet A	1	2	3	4	5	6	7	8	9	10	Final
Chungnam (Yoo)	0	0	0	1	0	0	0	X	X	X	1
Uiseong-gun Office (Lee) 🔨	0	2	2	0	4	1	2	X	X	X	11

Sheet C	1	2	3	4	5	6	7	8	9	10	Final
Gangwon Province (J. Park)	0	0	2	1	0	2	2	0	5	X	12
Bongmyeong High School (Yoon) 🔨	1	0	0	0	1	0	0	1	0	X	3

Sheet E	1	2	3	4	5	6	7	8	9	10	Final
Uijeongbu High School (G. Park)	0	0	1	0	1	0	0	1	X	X	3
Seoul City Hall (Jeong) 🔨	0	1	0	2	0	1	4	0	X	X	8

==== Draw 7 ====
Wednesday, June 12, 10:00 am

Sheet B	1	2	3	4	5	6	7	8	9	10	Final
Bongmyeong High School (Yoon) 🔨	1	1	0	0	0	0	1	0	0	X	3
Uijeongbu High School (G. Park)	0	0	4	1	3	1	0	2	1	X	12

Sheet C	1	2	3	4	5	6	7	8	9	10	Final
Gyeongbuk Sports Council (Kim) 🔨	2	0	2	3	0	1	0	0	4	X	12
Chungnam (Yoo)	0	1	0	0	0	0	0	1	0	X	2

Sheet D	1	2	3	4	5	6	7	8	9	10	Final
Uiseong-gun Office (Lee) 🔨	4	0	1	0	2	1	0	1	0	X	9
Seoul City Hall (Jeong)	0	3	0	3	0	0	1	0	0	X	7

==== Draw 9 ====
Thursday, June 13, 9:00 am

Sheet C	1	2	3	4	5	6	7	8	9	10	Final
Bongmyeong High School (Yoon)	0	3	1	0	0	2	0	0	X	X	6
Seoul City Hall (Jeong) 🔨	5	0	0	4	3	0	2	1	X	X	15

Sheet D	1	2	3	4	5	6	7	8	9	10	Final
Gangwon Province (J. Park) 🔨	0	3	2	0	2	1	0	1	X	X	9
Chungnam (Yoo)	0	0	0	1	0	0	1	0	X	X	2

Sheet E	1	2	3	4	5	6	7	8	9	10	Final
Uiseong-gun Office (Lee)	0	0	1	0	2	0	0	1	0	X	4
Gyeongbuk Sports Council (Kim) 🔨	0	2	0	1	0	2	1	0	2	X	8

==== Draw 11 ====
Thursday, June 13, 7:00 pm

Sheet A	1	2	3	4	5	6	7	8	9	10	Final
Bongmyeong High School (Yoon)	0	2	0	0	2	0	1	1	0	X	6
Uiseong-gun Office (Lee) 🔨	1	0	5	2	0	3	0	0	4	X	15

Sheet B	1	2	3	4	5	6	7	8	9	10	Final
Gangwon Province (J. Park) 🔨	0	1	1	1	0	0	0	0	2	1	6
Seoul City Hall (Jeong)	0	0	0	0	0	2	0	0	0	0	2

Sheet C	1	2	3	4	5	6	7	8	9	10	Final
Uijeongbu High School (G. Park)	0	0	1	1	0	0	2	0	X	X	4
Gyeongbuk Sports Council (Kim) 🔨	1	2	0	0	1	0	0	6	X	X	10

==== Draw 13 ====
Friday, June 14, 3:00 pm

Sheet A	1	2	3	4	5	6	7	8	9	10	Final
Seoul City Hall (Jeong)	0	2	2	4	0	1	X	X	X	X	9
Gyeongbuk Sports Council (Kim) 🔨	0	0	0	0	0	0	X	X	X	X	0

Sheet B	1	2	3	4	5	6	7	8	9	10	Final
Uiseong-gun Office (Lee)	0	0	0	0	1	0	2	0	0	1	4
Gangwon Province (J. Park) 🔨	0	0	0	2	0	1	0	2	0	0	5

Sheet D	1	2	3	4	5	6	7	8	9	10	Final
Chungnam (Yoo) 🔨	1	0	0	1	0	1	0	2	0	X	5
Uijeongbu High School (G. Park)	0	1	1	0	3	0	3	0	2	X	10

=== Playoffs ===
Page playoff system
1	Gangwon Province	8
2	Gyeongbuk Sports Council	6
3	Uiseong-gun Office	8
4	Seoul City Hall	3

Semifinal
2	Gyeongbuk Sports Council	7
3	Uiseong-gun Office	8

Final
1	Gangwon Province	5
3	Uiseong-gun Office	10

==== 1 vs. 2 ====
Saturday, June 15, 5:00 pm

Sheet E	1	2	3	4	5	6	7	8	9	10	Final
Gangwon Province (J. Park) 🔨	0	2	0	0	1	1	0	3	0	1	8
Gyeongbuk Sports Council (Kim)	0	0	0	2	0	0	2	0	2	0	6

==== 3 vs. 4 ====
Saturday, June 15, 5:00 pm

Sheet B	1	2	3	4	5	6	7	8	9	10	Final
Uiseong-gun Office (Lee) 🔨	0	0	1	2	0	2	0	2	1	X	8
Seoul City Hall (Jeong)	0	1	0	0	1	0	1	0	0	X	3

==== Semifinal ====
Sunday, June 16, 1:00 pm

Sheet A	1	2	3	4	5	6	7	8	9	10	Final
Gyeongbuk Sports Council (Kim) 🔨	0	2	0	0	1	0	2	0	2	0	7
Uiseong-gun Office (Lee)	0	0	2	1	0	2	0	2	0	1	8

==== Gold medal game ====
Monday, June 17, 12:00 pm

Sheet C	1	2	3	4	5	6	7	8	9	10	Final
Gangwon Province (J. Park) 🔨	0	0	1	0	0	1	0	3	0	X	5
Uiseong-gun Office (Lee)	0	2	0	1	0	0	3	0	4	X	10

2024 Korean Curling Championships
(South Korea)
Lee Jae-beom
1st Korean Championship title

=== Final standings ===
Place	Team	Skip
1st place, gold medalist(s)	Uiseong-gun Office	Lee Jae-beom
2nd place, silver medalist(s)	Gangwon Province	Park Jong-duk
3rd place, bronze medalist(s)	Gyeongbuk Sports Council	Kim Soo-hyuk
4	Seoul City Hall	Jeong Byeong-jin
5	Uijeongbu High School	Park Gun-woo
6	Bongmyeong High School	Yoon Ji-hoo
7	Chungnam	Yoo Jing-han

== Women ==
=== Teams ===
The teams are listed as follows:

Team	Skip	Third	Second	Lead	Alternate	Locale
Bongmyeong High School	Kim Gyu-ri	Park Jeong-won	Kwon Yoo-an	Byun Yu-jin		Cheongju
Chuncheon City Hall	Ha Seung-youn	Kim Hye-rin	Yang Tae-i	Kim Su-jin	Park Seo-jin	Chuncheon
Gangneung City Hall	Kim Eun-jung	Kim Kyeong-ae	Kim Cho-hi	Kim Seon-yeong	Kim Yeong-mi	Gangneung
Gyeonggi Province	Gim Eun-ji	Kim Min-ji	Kim Su-ji	Seol Ye-eun	Seol Ye-ji	Uijeongbu
Jeonbuk Province	Kang Bo-bae	Jeong Jae-hee	Kim Min-seo	Kim Ji-soo		Jeonbuk
Kyungil University	Park Han-byul	Kim Hae-jeong	Shim Yu-jeong	Lee Hae-in	Oh Ji-hyeon	Daegu
Seoul City Hall	Lee Eun-chae	Park You-been	Yang Seung-hee	Kim Ji-yoon		Seoul
Uiseong-gun Office	Kim Su-hyeon	Bang Yu-jin	Kang Min-hyo	Ahn Jeong-yeon	Jeong Min-jae	Uiseong

=== Round robin standings ===
Final Round Robin Standings

Key
Teams to Playoffs

Team	Skip	W	L	W–L	PF	PA	EW	EL	BE	SE	DSC
Chuncheon City Hall	Ha Seung-youn	6	1	–	51	22	31	19	8	16	23.40
Gangneung City Hall	Kim Eun-jung	5	2	1–0	60	40	29	28	4	7	33.50
Gyeonggi Province	Gim Eun-ji	5	2	0–1	54	33	32	24	6	10	25.30
Seoul City Hall	Lee Eun-chae	3	4	2–1; 1–0	45	43	27	28	2	10	49.40
Kyungil University	Park Han-byul	3	4	2–1; 0–1	47	48	24	30	3	7	76.10
Jeonbuk Province	Kang Bo-bae	3	4	1–2; 1–0	47	41	30	24	9	11	51.40
Uiseong-gun Office	Kim Su-hyeon	3	4	1–2; 0–1	42	41	32	24	2	13	38.00
Bongmyeong High School	Kim Gyu-ri	0	7	–	12	90	11	39	1	3	150.30

=== Round robin results ===
All draws are listed in Korea Standard Time (UTC+09:00).

==== Draw 2 ====
Monday, June 10, 12:00 pm

Sheet B	1	2	3	4	5	6	7	8	9	10	Final
Seoul City Hall (Lee) 🔨	0	5	3	3	1	2	X	X	X	X	14
Bongmyeong High School (G. Kim)	1	0	0	0	0	0	X	X	X	X	1

Sheet C	1	2	3	4	5	6	7	8	9	10	Final
Kyungil University (Park)	0	1	0	1	0	3	0	0	X	X	5
Gangneung City Hall (E. Kim) 🔨	3	0	2	0	2	0	2	1	X	X	10

Sheet D	1	2	3	4	5	6	7	8	9	10	11	Final
Jeonbuk Province (Kang) 🔨	0	0	0	1	1	0	0	0	1	1	1	5
Uiseong-gun Office (S. Kim)	0	0	1	0	0	1	1	1	0	0	0	4

Sheet E	1	2	3	4	5	6	7	8	9	10	Final
Chuncheon City Hall (Ha)	0	1	0	0	2	0	0	1	0	1	5
Gyeonggi Province (Gim) 🔨	0	0	1	0	0	1	2	0	2	0	6

==== Draw 4 ====
Tuesday, June 11, 9:00 am

Sheet A	1	2	3	4	5	6	7	8	9	10	11	Final
Jeonbuk Province (Kang) 🔨	0	1	0	0	1	0	1	0	3	0	2	8
Gyeonggi Province (Gim)	0	0	2	0	0	1	0	1	0	2	0	6

Sheet C	1	2	3	4	5	6	7	8	9	10	11	Final
Gangneung City Hall (E. Kim) 🔨	0	0	0	0	3	0	2	0	3	0	0	8
Uiseong-gun Office (S. Kim)	0	2	1	1	0	2	0	1	0	1	3	11

Sheet D	1	2	3	4	5	6	7	8	9	10	Final
Bongmyeong High School (G. Kim) 🔨	0	0	0	0	0	0	2	1	X	X	3
Chuncheon City Hall (Ha)	1	2	1	3	1	3	0	0	X	X	11

Sheet E	1	2	3	4	5	6	7	8	9	10	Final
Kyungil University (Park) 🔨	0	1	0	0	1	1	0	0	2	X	5
Seoul City Hall (Lee)	0	0	4	2	0	0	1	1	0	X	8

==== Draw 6 ====
Tuesday, June 11, 7:00 pm

Sheet B	1	2	3	4	5	6	7	8	9	10	Final
Bongmyeong High School (G. Kim) 🔨	0	0	0	0	0	0	X	X	X	X	0
Jeonbuk Province (Kang)	2	1	1	4	3	3	X	X	X	X	14

Sheet C	1	2	3	4	5	6	7	8	9	10	Final
Chuncheon City Hall (Ha) 🔨	0	2	2	0	1	1	0	2	0	X	8
Seoul City Hall (Lee)	0	0	0	1	0	0	1	0	1	X	3

Sheet D	1	2	3	4	5	6	7	8	9	10	Final
Uiseong-gun Office (S. Kim) 🔨	1	0	0	0	1	0	1	0	1	X	4
Kyungil University (Park)	0	0	2	3	0	2	0	2	0	X	9

Sheet E	1	2	3	4	5	6	7	8	9	10	Final
Gyeonggi Province (Gim)	0	0	2	1	0	0	2	0	1	0	6
Gangneung City Hall (E. Kim) 🔨	0	1	0	0	2	0	0	1	0	3	7

==== Draw 8 ====
Wednesday, June 12, 3:00 pm

Sheet A	1	2	3	4	5	6	7	8	9	10	Final
Kyungil University (Park)	0	1	0	1	0	0	0	0	0	X	2
Chuncheon City Hall (Ha) 🔨	0	0	0	0	2	2	1	1	2	X	8

Sheet B	1	2	3	4	5	6	7	8	9	10	Final
Uiseong-gun Office (S. Kim)	0	0	1	0	1	0	0	1	0	0	3
Gyeonggi Province (Gim) 🔨	0	1	0	2	0	0	1	0	0	1	5

Sheet C	1	2	3	4	5	6	7	8	9	10	Final
Seoul City Hall (Lee)	0	0	2	1	0	1	0	0	1	1	6
Jeonbuk Province (Kang) 🔨	1	0	0	0	1	0	0	2	0	0	4

Sheet E	1	2	3	4	5	6	7	8	9	10	Final
Gangneung City Hall (E. Kim) 🔨	2	0	4	3	2	0	2	0	X	X	13
Bongmyeong High School (G. Kim)	0	1	0	0	0	1	0	1	X	X	3

==== Draw 10 ====
Thursday, June 13, 2:00 pm

Sheet A	1	2	3	4	5	6	7	8	9	10	Final
Bongmyeong High School (G. Kim)	1	0	0	0	1	0	0	0	0	X	2
Uiseong-gun Office (S. Kim) 🔨	0	1	1	2	0	3	2	1	0	X	10

Sheet B	1	2	3	4	5	6	7	8	9	10	Final
Gyeonggi Province (Gim) 🔨	1	0	1	1	0	0	4	1	0	X	8
Kyungil University (Park)	0	2	0	0	0	2	0	0	1	X	5

Sheet C	1	2	3	4	5	6	7	8	9	10	Final
Jeonbuk Province (Kang) 🔨	1	0	0	0	0	0	1	0	1	X	3
Chuncheon City Hall (Ha)	0	1	0	3	0	0	0	3	0	X	7

Sheet D	1	2	3	4	5	6	7	8	9	10	Final
Seoul City Hall (Lee)	0	0	1	0	2	0	0	0	X	X	3
Gangneung City Hall (E. Kim) 🔨	0	2	0	3	0	1	1	3	X	X	10

==== Draw 12 ====
Friday, June 14, 10:00 am

Sheet A	1	2	3	4	5	6	7	8	9	10	Final
Uiseong-gun Office (S. Kim) 🔨	0	1	0	2	0	1	2	0	1	1	8
Seoul City Hall (Lee)	0	0	1	0	3	0	0	2	0	0	6

Sheet B	1	2	3	4	5	6	7	8	9	10	Final
Chuncheon City Hall (Ha) 🔨	0	1	0	0	1	1	0	0	2	1	6
Gangneung City Hall (E. Kim)	0	0	1	1	0	0	0	1	0	0	3

Sheet C	1	2	3	4	5	6	7	8	9	10	Final
Gyeonggi Province (Gim) 🔨	3	2	1	1	4	3	2	X	X	X	16
Bongmyeong High School (G. Kim)	0	0	0	0	0	0	0	X	X	X	0

Sheet E	1	2	3	4	5	6	7	8	9	10	Final
Jeonbuk Province (Kang) 🔨	0	1	0	0	3	1	0	0	2	X	7
Kyungil University (Park)	0	0	2	5	0	0	1	1	0	X	9

==== Draw 14 ====
Saturday, June 15, 10:00 am

Sheet A	1	2	3	4	5	6	7	8	9	10	Final
Gangneung City Hall (E. Kim) 🔨	0	2	0	2	2	0	3	0	0	X	9
Jeonbuk Province (Kang)	0	0	1	0	0	2	0	2	1	X	6

Sheet C	1	2	3	4	5	6	7	8	9	10	Final
Bongmyeong High School (G. Kim) 🔨	0	1	0	1	0	1	0	X	X	X	3
Kyungil University (Park)	1	0	5	0	3	0	3	X	X	X	12

Sheet D	1	2	3	4	5	6	7	8	9	10	11	Final
Gyeonggi Province (Gim) 🔨	0	0	0	2	0	2	0	0	1	0	2	7
Seoul City Hall (Lee)	0	1	1	0	1	0	0	1	0	1	0	5

Sheet E	1	2	3	4	5	6	7	8	9	10	Final
Uiseong-gun Office (S. Kim)	0	0	0	1	0	0	0	1	0	X	2
Chuncheon City Hall (Ha) 🔨	0	2	0	0	0	0	1	0	3	X	6

=== Playoffs ===
Page playoff system
1	Chuncheon City Hall	7
2	Gangneung City Hall	4
3	Gyeonggi Province	10
4	Seoul City Hall	2

Semifinal
2	Gangneung City Hall	4
3	Gyeonggi Province	10

Final
1	Chuncheon City Hall	5
3	Gyeonggi Province	6

==== 1 vs. 2 ====
Saturday, June 15, 5:00 pm

Sheet C	1	2	3	4	5	6	7	8	9	10	Final
Chuncheon City Hall (Ha) 🔨	1	1	1	0	0	0	1	0	0	3	7
Gangneung City Hall (E. Kim)	0	0	0	0	0	2	0	0	2	0	4

==== 3 vs. 4 ====
Saturday, June 15, 5:00 pm

Sheet A	1	2	3	4	5	6	7	8	9	10	Final
Gyeonggi Province (Gim) 🔨	0	2	0	5	0	1	1	1	X	X	10
Seoul City Hall (Lee)	0	0	1	0	1	0	0	0	X	X	2

==== Semifinal ====
Sunday, June 16, 1:00 pm

Sheet E	1	2	3	4	5	6	7	8	9	10	Final
Gangneung City Hall (E. Kim) 🔨	0	0	2	0	2	0	0	0	0	X	4
Gyeonggi Province (Gim)	0	0	0	2	0	4	1	1	2	X	10

==== Gold medal game ====
Monday, June 17, 5:00 pm

Sheet D	1	2	3	4	5	6	7	8	9	10	11	Final
Chuncheon City Hall (Ha) 🔨	0	1	0	0	1	1	0	1	0	1	0	5
Gyeonggi Province (Gim)	0	0	2	0	0	0	2	0	1	0	1	6

2024 Korean Curling Championships
(South Korea)
Gim Eun-ji
6th Korean Championship title

=== Final standings ===
Place	Team	Skip
1st place, gold medalist(s)	Gyeonggi Province	Gim Eun-ji
2nd place, silver medalist(s)	Chuncheon City Hall	Ha Seung-youn
3rd place, bronze medalist(s)	Gangneung City Hall	Kim Eun-jung
4	Seoul City Hall	Lee Eun-chae
5	Kyungil University	Park Han-byul
6	Jeonbuk Province	Kang Bo-bae
7	Uiseong-gun Office	Kim Su-hyeon
8	Bongmyeong High School	Kim Gyu-ri

== See also ==
- 2024 Korean Mixed Doubles Curling Championship
