= Kim Hak-kyun =

Kim Hak-kyun may refer to:

- Kim Hak-kyun (badminton)
- Kim Hak-kyun (curler)
