= 2021 Korean Curling Championships =

2021 KB Financial Korean Curling Championships
- Host city: Gangneung, South Korea
- Arena: Gangneung Curling Centre
- Dates: June 23 – July 3
- Men's winner: Gyeongbuk Athletic Association
- Curling club: Uiseong CC, Uiseong
- Skip: Kim Soo-hyuk
- Third: Kim Chang-min
- Second: Jeon Jae-ik
- Lead: Kim Hak-kyun
- Coach: Yoon So-min
- Finalist: Gangwon-do Office (Lee)
- Women's winner: Gangneung City Hall
- Curling club: Gangneung CC, Gangneung
- Skip: Kim Eun-jung
- Third: Kim Kyeong-ae
- Second: Kim Cho-hi
- Lead: Kim Seon-yeong
- Alternate: Kim Yeong-mi
- Coach: Lim Myung-sup
- Finalist: Chuncheon City Hall (Kim)

The 2021 Korean Curling Championships (branded as the 2021 KB Financial Korean Curling Championships), Korea's national curling championships, were held from June 23 to July 3 at the Gangneung Curling Centre in Gangneung, South Korea. The winning teams on both the men's and women's sides became the Korean National Teams for the 2021–22 curling season. They represented Korea at the 2021 Pacific-Asia Curling Championships, 2022 World Women's Curling Championship, 2022 World Men's Curling Championship and the Olympic Qualification Event in attempts to reach the 2022 Winter Olympics in Beijing, China. The championship was held in two rounds.

== Summary ==
=== Women ===
On the women's side, Team Kim Eun-jung, representing Gangneung City Hall, defended their national title from the 2020–21 season by winning both the first and second rounds. In Round 1, Teams Kim Eun-jung and Kim Min-ji, representing Chuncheon City Hall, both posted 4–0 records through the round robin and Teams Gim Un-chi (Gyeonggi Province) and Kim Ji-su (Songhyun High School A) went 3–1. Eun-jung then defeated Ji-su 5–3 in one semifinal and Gim Un-chi topped Kim Min-ji 8–6 in the other. Gangneung City Hall then defeated Gyeonggi Province 11–6 in the final. In Round 2, Kim Eun-jung and her team topped the double round robin with a 5–1 record which secured their place as the national champions. Team Kim Min-ji, who finished 4–2 and Team Gim Un-chi, who finished 3–3, played a second place game to determine the national team backup, which Min-ji won 6–4.

Team Kim Eun-jung, consisting of Eun-jung, third Kim Kyeong-ae, second Kim Cho-hi, lead Kim Seon-yeong, alternate Kim Yeong-mi and coaches Peter Gallant and Lim Myung-sup won the national championship during the 2020–21 season and represented South Korea at the 2021 World Women's Curling Championship. There, the team finished with a 7–6 record, tied for fifth place. However, due to their losses against Teams Canada and the United States, they placed seventh after the round robin, missing the playoffs and direct qualification for South Korea for the 2022 Winter Olympics. This meant the team had to play in the Olympic Qualification Event in December 2021 to qualify for the Olympics, which they won the silver medal at in 2018. At the qualification tournament, Team Kim finished third and secured the final women's berth to the Beijing Olympics.

=== Men ===
The men's championship also finished in two rounds with Team Kim Soo-hyuk, representing the Gyeongbuk Athletic Association, winning both the first and second rounds. In Round 1, Team Kim Soo-hyuk and defending champions Team Jeong Yeong-seok, representing the Gyeonggido Curling Federation, both went undefeated through the round robin and Teams Lee Ki-jeong (Gangwon-do Office) and Lee Jeong-jae (Seoul City Hall) both had one loss. The Gyeongbuk Athletic Association then topped Seoul City Hall 8–3 in one semifinal and the Gyeonggido Curling Federation beat Gangwon-do Office in the other. Kim Soo-hyuk then won the round by scoring three in an extra end to defeat Jeong Yeong-seok 10–7. In Round 2, Teams Kim Soo-hyuk and Lee Ki-jeong finished tied with 4–2 records after the round robin with Lee Jeong-jae at 3–3 and Jeong Yeong-seok at 1–5. Soo-hyuk and Ki-jeong then played a final to determine the winner of Round 2, which Soo-hyuk won 6–5 in an extra end.

After Team Jeong Yeong-seok won the 2020 Korean Curling Championships, they earned the right to represent South Korea at the 2021 World Men's Curling Championship. There, they finished with a 2–11 record. Like the women's team, Team Kim Soo-hyuk, consisting of Soo-hyuk, third Kim Chang-min, second Jeon Jae-ik, lead Kim Hak-kyun and coach Yoon So-min had to finish in the top three at the Olympic Qualification Event to qualify for the 2022 Olympics. Unfortunately, the team finished with a 2–6 record at the qualification tournament, failing to advance to the Games.

== Medalists ==
	Gold	Silver	Bronze
Men	Gyeongbuk Athletic Association; Kim Soo-hyuk; Kim Chang-min; Jeon Jae-ik; Kim Hak-kyun	Gangwon-do Office; Lee Ki-jeong; Park Jong-duk; Lee Ki-bok; Oh Seung-hoon; Seong Yu-jin	Gyeonggido Curling Federation; Jeong Yeong-seok; Kim Jeong-min; Park Se-won; Lee Jun-hyung; Seo Min-guk
Women	Gangneung City Hall; Kim Eun-jung; Kim Kyeong-ae; Kim Cho-hi; Kim Seon-yeong; Kim Yeong-mi	Chuncheon City Hall; Kim Min-ji; Kim Hye-rin; Ha Seung-youn; Kim Su-jin; Yang Tae-i	Gyeonggi Province; Gim Un-chi; Seol Ye-ji; Kim Su-ji; Seol Ye-eun; Park You-been

== Format ==
The Korean Curling Championships are held every year to determine the teams that will compete at the Pacific-Asia Curling Championships in hopes of reaching the World Curling Championships. Every four years, the winner of the championship also goes onto represent South Korea at the Olympic Games. In order to determine the Olympic Teams, the championship is held in three rounds to ensure the best team wins. The first round is open to all teams and the second round is open to the top four placing teams from the first round. If one team wins both the first and second rounds, then no third round is needed. The third and final round is a best-of-seven series between the winners of rounds one and two to determine the national champion and Olympic representative.

== Men ==
=== Teams ===
The men's teams are listed as follows:

Team	Skip	Third	Second	Lead	Alternate	Locale
Bongmyeong High School	Kim Tae-hun	Moon Hyeon	Kwon Oh-woo	Lim Byeong-hyeon	Shim Ju-hwan	Cheongju
Chuncheon High School	Kim Hak-kyun	Park Jin-hwan	Kim Myeong-jun	Park Jong-hyeon		Chuncheon
Gangwon-do Curling Club	Park Hyeon-su	Li Seon-kyu	Kim Jin-woong	Jeong Da-yeol		Gangwon
Gangwon-do Office	Lee Ki-jeong	Park Jong-duk	Lee Ki-bok	Oh Seung-hoon	Seong Yu-jin	Gangwon
Gyeongbuk Athletic Association	Kim Soo-hyuk	Kim Chang-min	Jeon Jae-ik	Kim Hak-kyun		Uiseong
Gyeonggido Curling Federation	Jeong Yeong-seok	Kim Jeong-min	Park Se-won	Lee Jun-hyung	Seo Min-guk	Gyeonggi-do
Kyungil University	Lee Jae-beom	Kim Eun-bin	Pyo Jeong-min	Choi Jae-hyeok		Daegu
Seoul City Hall	Lee Jeong-jae	Jeong Byeong-jin	Kim San	Kim Tae-hwan		Seoul
Seoul Sports High School	Oh Gyu-nam	Kang Min-jun	Park Yeong-ho	Park Jeong-hwan	Song Ye-sung	Seoul
Uijeongbu High School	Yang Woo-jin	Kim Min-sang	Jeong Hyeon-wuk	Park Seo-yun	Kim Hong-geon	Uijeongbu
Uiseong High School	Choi Won-yeong	Kim Hyo-jun	Kim Jin-hun	Lee Jun-hwa	Kim Min-je	Uiseong

=== Round 1 ===
The first round of the championship was held from June 23 to 28. The top two teams in each pool advanced to the playoffs and the second round.

==== Round robin standings ====
Final Round Robin Standings

Key
Teams to Playoffs

Pool A	Skip	W	L	DSC
Gyeongbuk Athletic Association	Kim Soo-hyuk	4	0	49.3
Gangwon-do Office	Lee Ki-jeong	3	1	24.4
Kyungil University	Lee Jae-beom	2	2	47.4
Seoul Sports High School	Oh Gyu-nam	1	3	111.9
Uijeongbu High School	Yang Woo-jin	0	4	36.7

Pool B	Skip	W	L	DSC
Gyeonggido Curling Federation	Jeong Yeong-seok	5	0	53.8
Seoul City Hall	Lee Jeong-jae	4	1	29.1
Uiseong High School	Choi Won-yeong	3	2	46.7
Chuncheon High School	Kim Hak-kyun	1	4	84.3
Bongmyeong High School	Kim Tae-hun	1	4	86.5
Gangwon-do Curling Club	Park Hyeon-su	1	4	123.0

==== Round robin results ====
All draw times are listed in Korean Standard Time (UTC+09:00).

===== Draw 1 =====
Wednesday, June 23, 9:00 am

Sheet A	1	2	3	4	5	6	7	8	9	10	Final
Seoul Sports High School (Oh)	0	0	1	0	0	1	1	0	X	X	3
Gangwon-do Office (K. Lee) 🔨	0	3	0	3	0	0	0	3	X	X	9

Sheet B	1	2	3	4	5	6	7	8	9	10	Final
Gyeongbuk Athletic Association (S. Kim)	0	2	0	2	0	0	4	1	X	X	9
Kyungil University (J. B. Lee) 🔨	1	0	1	0	0	1	0	0	X	X	3

Sheet C	1	2	3	4	5	6	7	8	9	10	11	Final
Chuncheon High School (H. Kim) 🔨	1	0	0	3	0	0	3	1	0	0	0	8
Bongmyeong High School (T. Kim)	0	1	1	0	1	1	0	0	2	2	1	9

Sheet D	1	2	3	4	5	6	7	8	9	10	Final
Seoul City Hall (J. J. Lee) 🔨	0	0	2	0	2	0	0	0	0	2	6
Uiseong High School (Choi)	1	1	0	1	0	1	0	1	0	0	5

===== Draw 3 =====
Wednesday, June 23, 7:00 pm

Sheet A	1	2	3	4	5	6	7	8	9	10	Final
Gangwon-do Curling Club (Park)	0	1	0	1	0	1	0	X	X	X	3
Gyeonggido Curling Federation (Jeong) 🔨	3	0	3	0	2	0	4	X	X	X	12

Sheet B	1	2	3	4	5	6	7	8	9	10	Final
Chuncheon High School (H. Kim)	0	0	0	1	0	1	0	2	0	X	4
Uiseong High School (Choi) 🔨	0	0	1	0	2	0	3	0	1	X	7

Sheet C	1	2	3	4	5	6	7	8	9	10	Final
Gangwon-do Office (K. Lee) 🔨	0	0	2	0	1	0	0	0	2	0	5
Gyeongbuk Athletic Association (S. Kim)	0	2	0	1	0	0	1	1	0	1	6

Sheet D	1	2	3	4	5	6	7	8	9	10	Final
Seoul Sports High School (Oh)	0	2	0	3	0	0	4	0	1	X	10
Uijeongbu High School (Yang) 🔨	0	0	2	0	2	0	0	2	0	X	6

===== Draw 5 =====
Thursday, June 24, 2:00 pm

Sheet A	1	2	3	4	5	6	7	8	9	10	Final
Gyeonggido Curling Federation (Jeong) 🔨	2	0	2	0	3	6	X	X	X	X	13
Bongmyeong High School (T. Kim)	0	1	0	2	0	0	X	X	X	X	3

Sheet B	1	2	3	4	5	6	7	8	9	10	Final
Seoul City Hall (J. J. Lee) 🔨	4	0	0	3	0	0	2	0	X	X	9
Gangwon-do Curling Club (Park)	0	1	0	0	0	1	0	2	X	X	4

Sheet C	1	2	3	4	5	6	7	8	9	10	Final
Kyungil University (J. B. Lee)	0	0	2	2	2	0	4	0	3	X	13
Uijeongbu High School (Yang) 🔨	1	2	0	0	0	2	0	2	0	X	7

Sheet D	1	2	3	4	5	6	7	8	9	10	Final
Seoul Sports High School (Oh)	0	0	0	0	0	0	0	X	X	X	0
Gyeongbuk Athletic Association (S. Kim) 🔨	2	1	2	0	0	2	1	X	X	X	8

===== Draw 7 =====
Friday, June 25, 9:00 am

Sheet A	1	2	3	4	5	6	7	8	9	10	Final
Seoul Sports High School (Oh)	0	1	1	0	1	0	0	1	0	X	4
Kyungil University (J. B. Lee) 🔨	2	0	0	1	0	2	1	0	2	X	8

Sheet B	1	2	3	4	5	6	7	8	9	10	Final
Chuncheon High School (H. Kim)	0	0	1	0	0	1	0	0	1	X	3
Gyeonggido Curling Federation (Jeong) 🔨	0	2	0	2	1	0	3	1	0	X	9

Sheet C	1	2	3	4	5	6	7	8	9	10	Final
Gangwon-do Curling Club (Park)	0	0	0	0	0	0	X	X	X	X	0
Uiseong High School (Choi) 🔨	0	0	4	4	1	3	X	X	X	X	12

Sheet D	1	2	3	4	5	6	7	8	9	10	Final
Gangwon-do Office (K. Lee)	5	0	0	3	4	3	X	X	X	X	15
Uijeongbu High School (Yang) 🔨	0	1	0	0	0	0	X	X	X	X	1

===== Draw 9 =====
Friday, June 25, 7:00 pm

Sheet A	1	2	3	4	5	6	7	8	9	10	Final
Gyeongbuk Athletic Association (S. Kim) 🔨	0	3	0	1	0	2	0	3	X	X	9
Uijeongbu High School (Yang)	0	0	2	0	1	0	1	0	X	X	4

Sheet B	1	2	3	4	5	6	7	8	9	10	Final
Gangwon-do Office (K. Lee) 🔨	2	0	1	0	2	0	0	1	0	1	7
Kyungil University (J. B. Lee)	0	2	0	1	0	1	0	0	1	0	5

Sheet C	1	2	3	4	5	6	7	8	9	10	Final
Seoul City Hall (J. J. Lee) 🔨	2	2	0	3	0	2	2	X	X	X	11
Bongmyeong High School (T. Kim)	0	0	1	0	1	0	0	X	X	X	2

Sheet D	1	2	3	4	5	6	7	8	9	10	Final
Chuncheon High School (H. Kim) 🔨	3	2	0	0	2	1	0	0	0	X	8
Gangwon-do Curling Club (Park)	0	0	3	0	0	0	0	1	0	X	4

===== Draw 10 =====
Saturday, June 26, 9:00 am

Sheet B	1	2	3	4	5	6	7	8	9	10	Final
Uiseong High School (Choi) 🔨	4	2	2	2	2	0	X	X	X	X	12
Bongmyeong High School (T. Kim)	0	0	0	0	0	2	X	X	X	X	2

Sheet D	1	2	3	4	5	6	7	8	9	10	Final
Seoul City Hall (J. J. Lee) 🔨	0	0	0	1	0	2	0	0	X	X	3
Gyeonggido Curling Federation (Jeong)	1	2	1	0	2	0	1	1	X	X	8

===== Draw 12 =====
Saturday, June 26, 7:00 pm

Sheet A	1	2	3	4	5	6	7	8	9	10	Final
Chuncheon High School (H. Kim)	0	0	0	0	0	1	0	1	0	X	2
Seoul City Hall (J. J. Lee) 🔨	2	1	3	1	1	0	1	0	1	X	10

Sheet C	1	2	3	4	5	6	7	8	9	10	Final
Gyeonggido Curling Federation (Jeong)	0	1	0	0	0	2	1	0	0	4	8
Uiseong High School (Choi) 🔨	1	0	1	1	0	0	0	2	0	0	5

Sheet D	1	2	3	4	5	6	7	8	9	10	Final
Gangwon-do Curling Club (Park) 🔨	0	2	0	1	0	0	0	3	1	3	10
Bongmyeong High School (T. Kim)	2	0	1	0	0	1	2	0	0	0	6

==== Playoffs ====
Semifinals
A1	Gyeongbuk Athletic Association	8
B2	Seoul City Hall	3
B1	Gyeonggido Curling Federation	7
A2	Gangwon-do Office	4

Final
A1	Gyeongbuk Athletic Association	10
B1	Gyeonggido Curling Federation	7
Third place game
B2	Seoul City Hall	7
A2	Gangwon-do Office	4

===== Semifinals =====
Sunday, June 27, 7:00 pm

Sheet B	1	2	3	4	5	6	7	8	9	10	Final
Gyeongbuk Athletic Association (S. Kim) 🔨	0	1	0	0	3	0	2	1	1	X	8
Seoul City Hall (J. J. Lee)	0	0	0	1	0	2	0	0	0	X	3

Sheet C	1	2	3	4	5	6	7	8	9	10	Final
Gyeonggido Curling Federation (Jeong)	0	3	1	0	0	1	0	1	0	1	7
Gangwon-do Office (K. Lee) 🔨	1	0	0	2	0	0	1	0	0	0	4

===== Third place game =====
Monday, June 28, 11:00 am

Sheet D	1	2	3	4	5	6	7	8	9	10	Final
Seoul City Hall (J. J. Lee) 🔨	1	0	1	0	2	3	0	X	X	X	7
Gangwon-do Office (K. Lee)	0	2	0	1	0	0	1	X	X	X	4

===== Final =====
Monday, June 28, 6:00 pm

Sheet A	1	2	3	4	5	6	7	8	9	10	11	Final
Gyeongbuk Athletic Association (S. Kim) 🔨	1	0	0	2	0	0	3	0	1	0	3	10
Gyeonggido Curling Federation (Jeong)	0	2	0	0	1	1	0	2	0	1	0	7

=== Round 2 ===
The second round of the championship was held from June 30 to July 3. As Round 1 champions Kim Soo-hyuk won the round, no third round was needed.

==== Round robin standings ====
Final Round Robin Standings

Key
Teams to Final

Team	Skip	W	L	DSC
Gyeongbuk Athletic Association	Kim Soo-hyuk	4	2	26.9
Gangwon-do Office	Lee Ki-jeong	4	2	57.4
Seoul City Hall	Lee Jeong-jae	3	3	18.3
Gyeonggido Curling Federation	Jeong Yeong-seok	1	5	34.1

==== Round-robin results ====
All draw times are listed in Korean Standard Time (UTC+09:00).

===== Draw 1 =====
Wednesday, June 30, 10:00 am

Sheet B	1	2	3	4	5	6	7	8	9	10	Final
Seoul City Hall (J. J. Lee) 🔨	2	0	2	0	0	0	2	1	0	X	7
Gyeongbuk Athletic Association (S. Kim)	0	2	0	2	2	2	0	0	4	X	12

Sheet C	1	2	3	4	5	6	7	8	9	10	Final
Gangwon-do Office (K. Lee) 🔨	1	0	2	1	0	2	0	0	3	X	9
Gyeonggido Curling Federation (Jeong)	0	1	0	0	2	0	1	0	0	X	4

===== Draw 2 =====
Wednesday, June 30, 7:00 pm

Sheet A	1	2	3	4	5	6	7	8	9	10	Final
Seoul City Hall (J. J. Lee) 🔨	2	0	0	0	0	1	0	2	0	2	7
Gangwon-do Office (K. Lee)	0	1	1	0	2	0	0	0	2	0	6

Sheet D	1	2	3	4	5	6	7	8	9	10	Final
Gyeongbuk Athletic Association (S. Kim) 🔨	0	3	0	2	3	0	2	X	X	X	10
Gyeonggido Curling Federation (Jeong)	0	0	1	0	0	1	0	X	X	X	2

===== Draw 3 =====
Thursday, July 1, 10:00 am

Sheet A	1	2	3	4	5	6	7	8	9	10	Final
Gyeongbuk Athletic Association (S. Kim) 🔨	0	1	0	2	0	0	2	1	1	X	7
Gangwon-do Office (K. Lee)	0	0	2	0	0	1	0	0	0	X	3

Sheet B	1	2	3	4	5	6	7	8	9	10	Final
Seoul City Hall (J. J. Lee) 🔨	1	0	2	0	1	3	X	X	X	X	7
Gyeonggido Curling Federation (Jeong)	0	0	0	1	0	0	X	X	X	X	1

===== Draw 4 =====
Thursday, July 1, 7:00 pm

Sheet B	1	2	3	4	5	6	7	8	9	10	Final
Gangwon-do Office (K. Lee) 🔨	1	0	2	2	0	3	1	X	X	X	9
Gyeonggido Curling Federation (Jeong)	0	1	0	0	1	0	0	X	X	X	2

Sheet C	1	2	3	4	5	6	7	8	9	10	Final
Seoul City Hall (J. J. Lee)	0	0	1	0	1	0	1	0	5	X	8
Gyeongbuk Athletic Association (S. Kim) 🔨	0	1	0	1	0	1	0	2	0	X	5

===== Draw 5 =====
Friday, July 2, 10:00 am

Sheet A	1	2	3	4	5	6	7	8	9	10	Final
Gyeongbuk Athletic Association (S. Kim) 🔨	0	3	0	3	0	1	1	0	0	1	9
Gyeonggido Curling Federation (Jeong)	2	0	1	0	1	0	0	1	1	0	6

Sheet D	1	2	3	4	5	6	7	8	9	10	Final
Seoul City Hall (J. J. Lee)	0	0	1	0	1	1	X	X	X	X	3
Gangwon-do Office (K. Lee) 🔨	4	1	0	3	0	0	X	X	X	X	8

===== Draw 6 =====
Friday, July 2, 7:00 pm

Sheet C	1	2	3	4	5	6	7	8	9	10	Final
Seoul City Hall (J. J. Lee)	0	1	0	1	0	1	0	0	0	X	3
Gyeonggido Curling Federation (Jeong) 🔨	2	0	0	0	1	0	0	2	1	X	6

Sheet D	1	2	3	4	5	6	7	8	9	10	Final
Gyeongbuk Athletic Association (S. Kim)	0	0	1	0	0	0	1	0	0	X	2
Gangwon-do Office (K. Lee) 🔨	0	0	0	1	0	1	0	3	1	X	6

==== Playoffs ====
Final
1	Gyeongbuk Athletic Association	6
2	Gangwon-do Office	5

===== Final =====
Saturday, July 3, 10:00 am

Sheet A	1	2	3	4	5	6	7	8	9	10	11	Final
Gyeongbuk Athletic Association (S. Kim) 🔨	0	1	0	2	0	0	0	2	0	0	1	6
Gangwon-do Office (K. Lee)	0	0	1	0	1	1	0	0	1	1	0	5

2021 Korean Curling Championships
(South Korea)
Kim Soo-hyuk
6th Korean Championship title

=== Final standings ===
Place	Team	Skip
1st place, gold medalist(s)	Gyeongbuk Athletic Association	Kim Soo-hyuk
2nd place, silver medalist(s)	Gangwon-do Office	Lee Ki-jeong
3rd place, bronze medalist(s)	Gyeonggido Curling Federation	Jeong Yeong-seok
4	Seoul City Hall	Lee Jeong-jae
5	Uiseong High School	Choi Won-yeong
6	Kyungil University	Lee Jae-beom
7	Seoul Sports High School	Oh Gyu-nam
8	Chuncheon High School	Kim Hak-kyun
9	Bongmyeong High School	Kim Tae-hun
10	Gangwon-do Curling Club	Park Hyeon-su
11	Uijeongbu High School	Yang Woo-jin

== Women ==
=== Teams ===
The women's teams are listed as follows:

Team	Skip	Third	Second	Lead	Alternate	Locale
Bongmyeong High School	Kim Min-seo	Shim Yu-jeong	Cho Da-hye	Kim Su-bin	Lee Seong-rin	Cheongju
Chuncheon City Hall	Kim Min-ji	Kim Hye-rin	Ha Seung-youn	Kim Su-jin	Yang Tae-i	Chuncheon
Gangneung City Hall	Kim Eun-jung	Kim Kyeong-ae	Kim Cho-hi	Kim Seon-yeong	Kim Yeong-mi	Gangneung
Gyeonggi Province	Gim Un-chi	Seol Ye-ji	Kim Su-ji	Seol Ye-eun	Park You-been	Uijeongbu
Jeonbuk Province	Shin Ga-yeong	Song Yu-jin	Lee Ji-yeong	Shin Eun-jin		Jeonbuk
Sehyeon High School	Ban Hee-eun	Jeong Yung-yeong	Kang Su-ji	Shin Su-ah	Kwak Ji-hye	Seoul
Songhyun High School A	Kim Ji-su	Jeong Jae-hee	Kang Na-ra	Lee Eun-chae		Uijeongbu
Songhyun High School B	Kang Bo-bae	Park Han-byul	Choi Ye-jin	Lee You-sun	Jo Ju-hee	Uijeongbu
Uiseong Girls High School A	Lee Eun-chae	Yang Seung-hee	Jeong Min-jae	Kang Min-hyo		Uiseong
Uiseong Girls High School B	Kim Sur-yeong	Bang Yu-jin	Kim Hae-jeong	Kim Ji-hyeon		Uiseong

=== Round 1 ===
The first round of the championship was held from June 23 to 28. The top two teams in each pool advanced to the playoffs and the second round.

==== Round robin standings ====
Final Round Robin Standings

Key
Teams to Playoffs

Pool A	Skip	W	L	DSC
Gangneung City Hall	Kim Eun-jung	4	0	38.6
Gyeonggi Province	Gim Un-chi	3	1	57.4
Songhyun High School B	Kang Bo-bae	1	3	42.2
Uiseong Girls High School A	Lee Eun-chae	1	3	75.3
Bongmyeong High School	Kim Min-seo	1	3	77.9

Pool B	Skip	W	L	DSC
Chuncheon City Hall	Kim Min-ji	4	0	36.0
Songhyun High School A	Kim Ji-su	3	1	32.2
Jeonbuk Province	Shin Ga-yeong	2	2	64.6
Uiseong Girls High School B	Kim Sur-yeong	1	3	65.9
Sehyeon High School	Ban Hee-eun	0	4	113.7

==== Round robin results ====
All draw times are listed in Korean Standard Time (UTC+09:00).

===== Draw 2 =====
Wednesday, June 23, 2:00 pm

Sheet A	1	2	3	4	5	6	7	8	9	10	Final
Songhyun High School B (Kang) 🔨	1	0	3	0	1	0	1	1	1	X	8
Uiseong Girls High School A (Lee)	0	2	0	1	0	2	0	0	0	X	5

Sheet B	1	2	3	4	5	6	7	8	9	10	Final
Bongmyeong High School (M. S. Kim) 🔨	1	0	1	0	0	1	0	1	1	0	5
Gyeonggi Province (Gim)	0	1	0	1	2	0	1	0	0	1	6

Sheet C	1	2	3	4	5	6	7	8	9	10	Final
Jeonbuk Province (Shin) 🔨	0	0	1	1	0	4	1	1	2	X	10
Sehyeon High School (Ban)	0	0	0	0	1	0	0	0	0	X	1

Sheet D	1	2	3	4	5	6	7	8	9	10	Final
Songhyun High School A (J. Kim) 🔨	1	0	0	0	0	3	0	1	0	X	5
Chuncheon City Hall (M. J. Kim)	0	1	1	1	1	0	1	0	2	X	7

===== Draw 4 =====
Thursday, June 24, 9:00 am

Sheet A	1	2	3	4	5	6	7	8	9	10	Final
Sehyeon High School (Ban) 🔨	0	1	0	0	0	1	0	1	0	X	3
Songhyun High School A (J. Kim)	1	0	1	1	1	0	4	0	5	X	13

Sheet B	1	2	3	4	5	6	7	8	9	10	Final
Songhyun High School B (Kang)	0	0	1	0	0	1	0	2	1	X	5
Gangneung City Hall (E. Kim) 🔨	2	3	0	2	1	0	1	0	0	X	9

Sheet C	1	2	3	4	5	6	7	8	9	10	Final
Uiseong Girls High School A (Lee) 🔨	3	0	2	1	0	1	1	0	X	X	8
Bongmyeong High School (M. S. Kim)	0	1	0	0	1	0	0	1	X	X	3

Sheet D	1	2	3	4	5	6	7	8	9	10	Final
Jeonbuk Province (Shin)	2	0	3	3	2	0	1	0	X	X	11
Uiseong Girls High School B (S. Kim) 🔨	0	1	0	0	0	1	0	1	X	X	3

===== Draw 6 =====
Thursday, June 24, 7:00 pm

Sheet A	1	2	3	4	5	6	7	8	9	10	Final
Chuncheon City Hall (M. J. Kim) 🔨	0	6	0	3	2	0	X	X	X	X	11
Uiseong Girls High School B (S. Kim)	0	0	1	0	0	1	X	X	X	X	2

Sheet B	1	2	3	4	5	6	7	8	9	10	Final
Jeonbuk Province (Shin)	0	0	0	0	0	2	0	0	1	X	3
Songhyun High School A (J. Kim) 🔨	0	2	1	1	1	0	2	1	0	X	8

Sheet C	1	2	3	4	5	6	7	8	9	10	Final
Gyeonggi Province (Gim) 🔨	0	0	1	0	0	0	0	2	0	0	3
Gangneung City Hall (E. Kim)	0	0	0	2	1	1	1	0	1	1	7

Sheet D	1	2	3	4	5	6	7	8	9	10	Final
Songhyun High School B (Kang)	0	2	3	0	0	0	0	0	0	1	6
Bongmyeong High School (M. S. Kim) 🔨	2	0	0	2	1	1	0	0	2	0	8

===== Draw 8 =====
Friday, June 25, 2:00 pm

Sheet A	1	2	3	4	5	6	7	8	9	10	Final
Songhyun High School B (Kang) 🔨	2	0	0	0	0	1	0	1	0	X	4
Gyeonggi Province (Gim)	0	2	1	2	2	0	1	0	2	X	10

Sheet B	1	2	3	4	5	6	7	8	9	10	Final
Sehyeon High School (Ban)	0	0	0	0	0	0	3	0	X	X	3
Uiseong Girls High School B (S. Kim) 🔨	3	3	2	1	2	1	0	3	X	X	15

Sheet C	1	2	3	4	5	6	7	8	9	10	Final
Jeonbuk Province (Shin)	0	0	1	0	0	1	1	0	1	X	4
Chuncheon City Hall (M. J. Kim) 🔨	1	1	0	0	1	0	0	2	0	X	5

Sheet D	1	2	3	4	5	6	7	8	9	10	Final
Uiseong Girls High School A (Lee)	0	0	0	1	0	0	1	0	1	X	3
Gangneung City Hall (E. Kim) 🔨	1	0	1	0	1	2	0	2	0	X	7

===== Draw 11 =====
Saturday, June 26, 2:00 pm

Sheet A	1	2	3	4	5	6	7	8	9	10	Final
Bongmyeong High School (M. S. Kim)	0	0	0	1	0	0	1	0	X	X	2
Gangneung City Hall (E. Kim) 🔨	0	0	2	0	2	3	0	2	X	X	9

Sheet B	1	2	3	4	5	6	7	8	9	10	Final
Uiseong Girls High School A (Lee)	1	0	1	0	1	0	0	1	0	X	4
Gyeonggi Province (Gim) 🔨	0	3	0	2	0	0	2	0	1	X	8

Sheet C	1	2	3	4	5	6	7	8	9	10	Final
Songhyun High School A (J. Kim) 🔨	0	1	0	1	0	2	1	0	6	X	11
Uiseong Girls High School B (S. Kim)	0	0	3	0	1	0	0	1	0	X	5

Sheet D	1	2	3	4	5	6	7	8	9	10	Final
Sehyeon High School (Ban)	0	0	0	1	0	0	0	0	X	X	1
Chuncheon City Hall (M. J. Kim) 🔨	4	3	2	0	1	3	3	2	X	X	18

==== Playoffs ====
Semifinals
A1	Gangneung City Hall	5
B2	Songhyun High School A	3
B1	Chuncheon City Hall	6
A2	Gyeonggi Province	8

Final
A1	Gangneung City Hall	11
A2	Gyeonggi Province	6
Third place game
B2	Songhyun High School A	0
B1	Chuncheon City Hall	13

===== Semifinals =====
Sunday, June 27, 2:00 pm

Sheet B	1	2	3	4	5	6	7	8	9	10	Final
Gangneung City Hall (E. Kim) 🔨	0	0	1	0	1	0	2	0	0	1	5
Songhyun High School A (J. Kim)	0	0	0	0	0	2	0	1	0	0	3

Sheet C	1	2	3	4	5	6	7	8	9	10	Final
Chuncheon City Hall (M. J. Kim) 🔨	0	0	0	4	0	0	0	2	0	0	6
Gyeonggi Province (Gim)	0	1	1	0	1	0	1	0	3	1	8

===== Third place game =====
Monday, June 28, 11:00 am

Sheet A	1	2	3	4	5	6	7	8	9	10	Final
Songhyun High School A (J. Kim)	0	0	0	0	0	0	0	0	X	X	0
Chuncheon City Hall (M. J. Kim) 🔨	0	4	1	3	1	1	1	2	X	X	13

===== Final =====
Monday, June 28, 9:00 pm

Sheet A	1	2	3	4	5	6	7	8	9	10	Final
Gangneung City Hall (E. Kim) 🔨	0	2	0	2	0	2	1	0	4	X	11
Gyeonggi Province (Gim)	0	0	1	0	3	0	0	2	0	X	6

=== Round 2 ===
The second round of the championship was held from June 30 to July 3. As Round 1 champions Kim Eun-jung won the round, no third round was needed.

==== Round robin standings ====
Final Round Robin Standings

Key
National Team
Teams to Second Place Game

Team	Skip	W	L	DSC
Gangneung City Hall	Kim Eun-jung	5	1	38.1
Chuncheon City Hall	Kim Min-ji	4	2	32.3
Gyeonggi Province	Gim Un-chi	3	3	39.1
Songhyun High School A	Kim Ji-su	0	6	34.4

==== Round-robin results ====
All draw times are listed in Korean Standard Time (UTC+09:00).

===== Draw 1 =====
Wednesday, June 30, 10:00 am

Sheet A	1	2	3	4	5	6	7	8	9	10	Final
Gangneung City Hall (E. Kim)	0	0	1	0	0	1	0	0	3	X	5
Chuncheon City Hall (M. J. Kim) 🔨	0	1	0	1	0	0	1	0	0	X	3

Sheet D	1	2	3	4	5	6	7	8	9	10	Final
Gyeonggi Province (Gim) 🔨	0	2	1	0	2	0	0	1	0	2	8
Songhyun High School A (J. Kim)	0	0	0	2	0	1	0	0	2	0	5

===== Draw 2 =====
Wednesday, June 30, 7:00 pm

Sheet B	1	2	3	4	5	6	7	8	9	10	Final
Gangneung City Hall (E. Kim) 🔨	0	0	1	0	1	0	1	1	0	2	6
Gyeonggi Province (Gim)	0	0	0	1	0	1	0	0	2	0	4

Sheet C	1	2	3	4	5	6	7	8	9	10	Final
Chuncheon City Hall (M. J. Kim)	0	2	0	3	0	3	0	2	1	X	11
Songhyun High School A (J. Kim) 🔨	2	0	2	0	1	0	2	0	0	X	7

===== Draw 3 =====
Thursday, July 1, 10:00 am

Sheet C	1	2	3	4	5	6	7	8	9	10	Final
Gangneung City Hall (E. Kim) 🔨	0	3	1	0	2	0	0	3	0	1	10
Songhyun High School A (J. Kim)	1	0	0	3	0	2	0	0	1	0	7

Sheet D	1	2	3	4	5	6	7	8	9	10	Final
Gyeonggi Province (Gim)	0	0	1	0	0	2	0	1	1	0	5
Chuncheon City Hall (M. J. Kim) 🔨	0	2	0	1	1	0	1	0	0	1	6

===== Draw 4 =====
Thursday, July 1, 7:00 pm

Sheet A	1	2	3	4	5	6	7	8	9	10	Final
Gyeonggi Province (Gim) 🔨	3	0	0	2	0	2	2	2	X	X	11
Songhyun High School A (J. Kim)	0	2	2	0	1	0	0	0	X	X	5

Sheet D	1	2	3	4	5	6	7	8	9	10	Final
Gangneung City Hall (E. Kim) 🔨	0	0	1	0	1	0	0	0	1	0	3
Chuncheon City Hall (M. J. Kim)	0	1	0	1	0	0	1	2	0	1	6

===== Draw 5 =====
Friday, July 2, 10:00 am

Sheet B	1	2	3	4	5	6	7	8	9	10	Final
Chuncheon City Hall (M. J. Kim)	0	0	0	3	1	0	1	0	1	X	6
Songhyun High School A (J. Kim) 🔨	0	0	2	0	0	1	0	1	0	X	4

Sheet C	1	2	3	4	5	6	7	8	9	10	Final
Gangneung City Hall (E. Kim) 🔨	0	1	1	0	1	0	0	4	0	X	7
Gyeonggi Province (Gim)	1	0	0	1	0	0	1	0	1	X	4

===== Draw 6 =====
Friday, July 2, 7:00 pm

Sheet A	1	2	3	4	5	6	7	8	9	10	Final
Gyeonggi Province (Gim)	0	3	0	2	2	0	0	0	1	X	8
Chuncheon City Hall (M. J. Kim) 🔨	1	0	1	0	0	1	1	1	0	X	5

Sheet B	1	2	3	4	5	6	7	8	9	10	Final
Gangneung City Hall (E. Kim) 🔨	0	1	0	0	2	3	0	1	0	X	7
Songhyun High School A (J. Kim)	0	0	1	1	0	0	2	0	0	X	4

==== Playoffs ====
Second place game
2	Chuncheon City Hall	6
3	Gyeonggi Province	4

===== Second place game =====
Saturday, July 3, 2:00 pm

Sheet A	1	2	3	4	5	6	7	8	9	10	Final
Chuncheon City Hall (M. J. Kim) 🔨	0	1	0	2	0	0	2	1	0	X	6
Gyeonggi Province (Gim)	1	0	1	0	1	0	0	0	1	X	4

2021 Korean Curling Championships
(South Korea)
Kim Eun-jung
6th Korean Championship title

=== Final standings ===
Place	Team	Skip
1st place, gold medalist(s)	Gangneung City Hall	Kim Eun-jung
2nd place, silver medalist(s)	Chuncheon City Hall	Kim Min-ji
3rd place, bronze medalist(s)	Gyeonggi Province	Gim Un-chi
4	Songhyun High School A	Kim Ji-su
5	Jeonbuk Province	Shin Ga-yeong
6	Songhyun High School B	Kang Bo-bae
7	Uiseong Girls High School B	Kim Sur-yeong
8	Uiseong Girls High School A	Lee Eun-chae
9	Bongmyeong High School	Kim Min-seo
10	Sehyeon High School	Ban Hee-eun

== See also ==
- 2021 Korean Mixed Doubles Curling Championship
