= IARC =

IARC may refer to:

- International Aerial Robotics Competition
- International Age Rating Coalition
- International Agency for Research on Cancer
- International Arctic Research Center
- Israel Association of Radio Communication
- iArc, South Korean architecture firm
- IAR Systems C/C++ compiler (IAR C)

== See also ==
- Indian Association for Research in Computing Science (IARCS)
