= Jeon Jae-ik =

South Korean curler

- Curler ♂

Team
- Curling club: Uiseong CC, Uiseong, Gangwon Curling, Gangwon Province
- Skip: Kim Soo-hyuk
- Third: Kim Chang-min
- Second: Yoo Min-hyeon
- Lead: Kim Hak-kyun
- Alternate: Jeon Jae-ik
- Mixed doubles partner: Park Seo-jin

Curling career
- Member Association: South Korea
- World Championship: 2 (2022, 2026)
- World Mixed Championship: 2 (2017, 2019)
- Pacific-Asia Championship: 1 (2021)
Medal record
Curling
Representing South Korea
Pacific-Asia Championships
Gold medal – first place	2021 Almaty
Representing Gyeongbuk
Korean Mixed Doubles Championship
Silver medal – second place	2020 Gangneung
Representing Uiseong
Korean Men's Championship
Gold medal – first place	2021 Gangneung
Gold medal – first place	2025 Uijeongbu
Silver medal – second place	2022 Jincheon
Bronze medal – third place	2023 Gangneung
Bronze medal – third place	2024 Uijeongbu

Jeon Jae-ik (Note: Other writings: Jeon Jae-ik, Jae-ik Jeon, Jeon Jaeik, Jeon Jae Ik.) (Korean: 전재익) is a South Korean male curler.

At the international level, he is a 2021 Pacific-Asia champion curler.

At the national level, he is a Korean men's champion curler (2021).

== Teams ==
=== Men's ===
Season	Skip	Third	Second	Lead	Alternate	Coach	Events
2016–17	Woo Kyung-Ho	Kim Ho Gun	Jeon Jae-ik	Choi Won Yeong			
2021–22	Kim Soo-hyuk	Kim Chang-min	Jeon Jae-ik	Kim Hak-kyun		Yoon So-min	KMCC 2021 (gold)
2021–22	Kim Chang-min	Kim Soo-hyuk	Jeon Jae-ik	Kim Hak-kyun		Yoon So-min	PACC 2021 (gold); OQE 2021 (8th)
2021–22	Kim Soo-hyuk	Kim Chang-min	Seong Se-hyeon	Kim Hak-kyun	Jeon Jae-ik	Yoon So-min	WCC 2022 (8th)
2022–23	Kim Soo-hyuk (fourth)	Kim Chang-min (skip)	Seong Se-hyeon	Kim Hak-kyun	Jeon Jae-ik		KMCC 2022 (silver)
2023–24	Kim Soo-hyuk	Kim Chang-min	Kim Hak-kyun	Jeon Jae-ik			KMCC 2023 (bronze)
2024–25	Kim Soo-hyuk	Kim Chang-min	Yoo Min-hyeon	Kim Hak-kyun	Jeon Jae-ik		KMCC 2024 (bronze)
2025–26	Kim Soo-hyuk	Kim Chang-min	Yoo Min-hyeon	Kim Hak-kyun	Jeon Jae-ik		KMCC 2025 (gold)

=== Mixed ===
Season	Skip	Third	Second	Lead	Coach	Events
2017–18	Kim Chi-gu	Ryu Yeong-joo	Jeon Jae-ik	Choi Soo-yeon	Kim Kyung-seog	WMxCC 2017 (9th)
2019–20	Seong Yu-jin	Jang Hye-ji	Jeon Jae-ik	Song Yu-jin	Ahn Jae-sung	WMxCC 2019 (4th)

=== Mixed doubles ===
Season	Female	Male	Events
2019–20	Song Yu-jin	Jeon Jae-ik	
2020–21	Song Yu-jin	Jeon Jae-ik	KMDCC 2020 (silver)
2025–26	Park Seo-jin	Jeon Jae-ik	
