= Kim Min-woo (curler) =

South Korean curler (born 1996)

- Curler
- Born: January 10, 1996 (age 30); Seoul, South Korea

Team
- Curling club: Seoul CC, Seoul, KOR
- Skip: Lee Jae-beom
- Third: Lee Ki-jeong
- Second: Kim Min-woo
- Lead: Kim Jeong-min
- Mixed doubles partner: Lee Eun-chae

Curling career
- Member Association: South Korea
- World Championship: 1 (2023)
- Pan Continental Championship: 1 (2022)
Medal record
Men's curling
Representing South Korea
Pan Continental Curling Championships
| Silver medal – second place | 2022 Calgary |
Representing Seoul
Korean Men's Championship
| Gold medal – first place | 2022 Jincheon |
| Silver medal – second place | 2023 Gangneung |
| Silver medal – second place | 2025 Uijeongbu |
| Bronze medal – third place | 2014 Chongju |

Kim Min-woo (Korean: 김민우; born January 10, 1996) is a South Korean curler from Namyangju. Kim plays second for the Seoul Metropolitan Government team, skipped by Jeong Byeong-jin.

== Career ==
After serving in the Korean military, Kim joined the Seoul Metropolitan Government (also known as Seoul City Hall) team, in 2022. The team won the 2022 Korean Curling Championships, giving the team the right to represent South Korea for the 2022–23 curling season. In their first tour event of the season, the team won the 2022 Hokkaido Bank Curling Classic. The first international event the team played in was the inaugural 2022 Pan Continental Curling Championships. There, the team finished the round robin with a 6–1 record. In the playoffs, the team defeated the United States in the semifinal, but lost to Canada in the final, settling for the silver medal. Their finish qualified South Korea for the 2023 World Men's Curling Championship.
