= 2023 Korean Curling Championships =

- Host city: Gangneung, South Korea
- Arena: Gangneung Curling Centre
- Dates: June 22–30
- Men's winner: Gangwon Province
- Curling club: Gangneung CC, Gangneung
- Skip: Park Jong-duk
- Third: Jeong Yeong-seok
- Second: Oh Seung-hoon
- Lead: Seong Ji-hoon
- Coach: Lee Ye-jun
- Finalist: Seoul City Hall (Jeong)
- Women's winner: Gyeonggi Province
- Curling club: Uijeongbu CC, Uijeongbu
- Skip: Gim Eun-ji
- Third: Kim Min-ji
- Second: Kim Su-ji
- Lead: Seol Ye-eun
- Alternate: Seol Ye-ji
- Coach: Shin Dong-ho
- Finalist: Gangneung City Hall (Kim)

The 2023 Korean Curling Championships, Korea's national curling championships, were held from June 22 to 30 at the Gangneung Curling Centre in Gangneung, South Korea. The winning teams on both the men's and women's sides became the Korean National Teams for the 2023–24 curling season. They represented Korea at the 2023 Pan Continental Curling Championships and later the 2024 World Curling Championships. The championship was held in three rounds.

The men's event was headed by 2022 national champions Seoul City Hall, skipped by Jeong Byeong-jin. During their time as the national team, Seoul City Hall led Korea to a silver medal at the 2022 Pan Continental Curling Championships as well as successful results on tour at the 2022 Hokkaido Bank Curling Classic and the Belgium Men's Challenger. At the 2023 World Men's Curling Championship, they had a disappointing twelfth-place finish with a 1–11 record. Expected challengers for the 2023 national title were Gyeongbuk Sports Council (Kim Soo-hyuk), Gangwon Province (Park Jong-duk), and Uiseong-gun Office (Lee Jae-beom).

On the women's side, there were three teams separated from the rest of the pact, Chuncheon City Hall (Ha Seung-youn), Gyeonggi Province (Gim Eun-ji) and Gangneung City Hall (Kim Eun-jung). In 2022, Ha's Chuncheon City Hall rink upset both Gyeonggi and Gangneung to become the national team. During their reign, they claimed silver at the Pan Continental Curling Championships and finished ninth at the 2023 World Women's Curling Championship with a 5–7 record. They also won silver at the 2023 Winter World University Games. On tour, Chuncheon City Hall won the US Open of Curling and lost in the final of the S3 Group Curling Stadium Series. Gyeonggi Province entered the national championship as the fifth ranked team in the world after a breakthrough 2022–23 season while Gangneung City Hall were looking to reclaim the national title they last won in 2021.

== Medalists ==
	Gold	Silver	Bronze
Men	Gangwon Province; Park Jong-duk; Jeong Yeong-seok; Oh Seung-hoon; Seong Ji-hoon	Seoul City Hall; Jeong Byeong-jin; Lee Jeong-jae; Kim Min-woo; Kim Tae-hwan	Gyeongbuk Sports Council; Kim Soo-hyuk; Kim Chang-min; Kim Hak-kyun; Jeon Jae-ik
Women	Gyeonggi Province; Gim Eun-ji; Kim Min-ji; Kim Su-ji; Seol Ye-eun; Seol Ye-ji	Gangneung City Hall; Kim Eun-jung; Kim Kyeong-ae; Kim Cho-hi; Kim Seon-yeong; Kim Yeong-mi	Chuncheon City Hall; Ha Seung-youn; Kim Hye-rin; Yang Tae-i; Kim Su-jin

== Men ==
=== Teams ===
The teams are listed as follows:

Team	Skip	Third	Second	Lead	Alternate	Locale
Bongmyeong High School	Moon Hyeon	Lim Byeong-hyeon	Yoon Ji-hoo	Kwon Oh-woo		Cheongju
Chuncheon Motors	Kim Hak-jun	Park Jin-hwan	Kim Myeong-jun	Park Jong-hyeon	Woo Song-jun	Chuncheon
Gangwon Province	Park Jong-duk	Jeong Yeong-seok	Oh Seung-hoon	Seong Ji-hoon		Gangwon
Gyeongbuk Sports Council	Kim Soo-hyuk	Kim Chang-min	Kim Hak-kyun	Jeon Jae-ik		Uiseong
Seoul City Hall	Jeong Byeong-jin	Lee Jeong-jae	Kim Min-woo	Kim Tae-hwan		Seoul
Uiseong-gun Office	Lee Jae-beom	Kim Eun-bin	Pyo Jeong-min	Kim Jin-hun	Kim Hyo-jun	Uiseong

=== Round 1 ===
The first round of the championship was held from June 22 to 26. The top four teams overall advanced to the second round.

==== Round robin standings ====
Final Round Robin Standings

Key
Teams to Second Round

Team	Skip	W	L	W–L	PF	PA	EW	EL	BE	SE
Gangwon Province	Park Jong-duk	5	0	–	39	22	19	16	6	5
Seoul City Hall	Jeong Byeong-jin	4	1	–	43	25	22	17	1	5
Gyeongbuk Sports Council	Kim Soo-hyuk	3	2	–	32	19	21	13	5	7
Bongmyeong High School	Moon Hyeon	2	3	–	25	42	16	23	1	5
Uiseong-gun Office	Lee Jae-beom	1	4	–	25	31	16	18	5	6
Chuncheon Motors	Kim Hak-jun	0	5	–	20	45	14	21	5	2

==== Round robin results ====
All draws are listed in Korea Standard Time (UTC+09:00).

===== Draw 2 =====
Thursday, June 22, 2:00 pm

Sheet A	1	2	3	4	5	6	7	8	9	10	Final
Uiseong-gun Office (Lee)	1	0	0	0	0	1	1	1	1	0	5
Bongmyeong High School (Moon) 🔨	0	1	1	0	1	0	0	0	0	3	6

Sheet C	1	2	3	4	5	6	7	8	9	10	Final
Gyeongbuk Sports Council (S. Kim) 🔨	0	1	0	0	1	0	0	2	0	0	4
Gangwon Province (Park)	0	0	1	0	0	0	2	0	1	1	5

Sheet E	1	2	3	4	5	6	7	8	9	10	Final
Chuncheon Motors (H. Kim) 🔨	0	1	0	1	1	0	0	1	0	X	4
Seoul City Hall (Jeong)	0	0	2	0	0	3	1	0	3	X	9

===== Draw 4 =====
Friday, June 23, 9:00 am

Sheet B	1	2	3	4	5	6	7	8	9	10	Final
Bongmyeong High School (Moon)	0	0	0	1	0	0	X	X	X	X	1
Gyeongbuk Sports Council (S. Kim) 🔨	1	2	2	0	1	3	X	X	X	X	9

Sheet C	1	2	3	4	5	6	7	8	9	10	Final
Uiseong-gun Office (Lee)	0	2	0	2	0	0	5	1	X	X	10
Chuncheon Motors (H. Kim) 🔨	0	0	2	0	1	0	0	0	X	X	3

Sheet D	1	2	3	4	5	6	7	8	9	10	Final
Gangwon Province (Park)	0	3	0	1	0	3	0	3	0	0	10
Seoul City Hall (Jeong) 🔨	1	0	2	0	2	0	1	0	3	0	9

===== Draw 7 =====
Saturday, June 24, 2:00 pm

Sheet A	1	2	3	4	5	6	7	8	9	10	Final
Chuncheon Motors (H. Kim)	0	1	0	0	0	1	1	0	0	X	3
Gangwon Province (Park) 🔨	1	0	0	2	0	0	0	4	1	X	8

Sheet C	1	2	3	4	5	6	7	8	9	10	Final
Seoul City Hall (Jeong)	2	2	0	2	0	0	4	1	X	X	11
Bongmyeong High School (Moon) 🔨	0	0	1	0	1	1	0	0	X	X	3

Sheet D	1	2	3	4	5	6	7	8	9	10	Final
Gyeongbuk Sports Council (S. Kim)	0	2	1	0	2	0	0	0	1	1	7
Uiseong-gun Office (Lee) 🔨	2	0	0	1	0	0	0	2	0	0	5

===== Draw 9 =====
Sunday, June 25, 9:00 am

Sheet A	1	2	3	4	5	6	7	8	9	10	Final
Gyeongbuk Sports Council (S. Kim) 🔨	0	2	0	1	0	0	1	0	1	0	5
Seoul City Hall (Jeong)	0	0	1	0	0	1	0	3	0	1	6

Sheet D	1	2	3	4	5	6	7	8	9	10	Final
Bongmyeong High School (Moon) 🔨	3	0	3	0	1	1	0	3	0	X	11
Chuncheon Motors (H. Kim)	0	2	0	4	0	0	1	0	1	X	8

Sheet E	1	2	3	4	5	6	7	8	9	10	Final
Uiseong-gun Office (Lee)	0	0	0	0	1	0	1	0	X	X	2
Gangwon Province (Park) 🔨	0	0	4	1	0	2	0	0	X	X	7

===== Draw 12 =====
Monday, June 26, 2:00 pm

Sheet A	1	2	3	4	5	6	7	8	9	10	Final
Chuncheon Motors (H. Kim)	0	0	0	2	0	0	0	0	0	X	2
Gyeongbuk Sports Council (S. Kim) 🔨	0	2	0	0	0	3	0	1	1	X	7

Sheet B	1	2	3	4	5	6	7	8	9	10	Final
Gangwon Province (Park)	0	2	0	0	3	1	0	3	X	X	9
Bongmyeong High School (Moon) 🔨	0	0	2	1	0	0	1	0	X	X	4

Sheet E	1	2	3	4	5	6	7	8	9	10	Final
Seoul City Hall (Jeong) 🔨	1	0	1	0	0	4	2	X	X	X	8
Uiseong-gun Office (Lee)	0	2	0	0	1	0	0	X	X	X	3

=== Round 2 ===
The second round of the championship was held from June 27 to 28. The top two teams advanced to the best-of-five final round.

==== Round robin standings ====
Final Round Robin Standings

Key
Teams to Third Round

Team	Skip	W	L	W–L	PF	PA	EW	EL	BE	SE
Gangwon Province	Park Jong-duk	3	0	–	26	11	13	7	4	4
Seoul City Hall	Jeong Byeong-jin	2	1	–	18	13	10	9	3	3
Gyeongbuk Sports Council	Kim Soo-hyuk	1	2	–	21	21	9	11	1	1
Bongmyeong High School	Moon Hyeon	0	3	–	10	30	7	12	0	0

==== Round robin results ====
All draws are listed in Korea Standard Time (UTC+09:00).

===== Draw 14 =====
Tuesday, June 27, 9:00 am

Sheet C	1	2	3	4	5	6	7	8	9	10	Final
Gangwon Province (Park) 🔨	1	0	0	3	3	0	4	X	X	X	11
Bongmyeong High School (Moon)	0	1	0	0	0	1	0	X	X	X	2

Sheet D	1	2	3	4	5	6	7	8	9	10	Final
Gyeongbuk Sports Council (S. Kim)	0	0	1	0	0	1	0	0	X	X	2
Seoul City Hall (Jeong) 🔨	0	1	0	0	3	0	1	4	X	X	9

===== Draw 16 =====
Tuesday, June 27, 7:00 pm

Sheet B	1	2	3	4	5	6	7	8	9	10	Final
Gangwon Province (Park) 🔨	0	2	0	3	1	0	0	1	0	1	8
Gyeongbuk Sports Council (S. Kim)	0	0	3	0	0	0	2	0	2	0	7

Sheet D	1	2	3	4	5	6	7	8	9	10	Final
Bongmyeong High School (Moon)	0	0	2	0	1	0	1	0	X	X	4
Seoul City Hall (Jeong) 🔨	1	1	0	2	0	3	0	0	X	X	7

===== Draw 18 =====
Wednesday, June 28, 2:00 pm

Sheet C	1	2	3	4	5	6	7	8	9	10	Final
Gangwon Province (Park) 🔨	0	0	0	3	0	2	1	1	X	X	7
Seoul City Hall (Jeong)	0	1	0	0	1	0	0	0	X	X	2

Sheet D	1	2	3	4	5	6	7	8	9	10	Final
Gyeongbuk Sports Council (S. Kim) 🔨	2	0	2	0	3	5	X	X	X	X	12
Bongmyeong High School (Moon)	0	2	0	2	0	0	X	X	X	X	4

=== Round 3 ===
The third round of the championship was held from June 29 to 30. The teams' head-to-head games in rounds one and two were counted towards their best-of-five score.

Best-of-five
1	Gangwon Province	10	7	7	X	X
2	Seoul City Hall	9	2	4	X	X

==== Draw 21 ====
Thursday, June 29, 6:00 pm

Sheet C	1	2	3	4	5	6	7	8	9	10	Final
Gangwon Province (Park) 🔨	2	1	0	1	0	3	0	0	0	X	7
Seoul City Hall (Jeong)	0	0	3	0	0	0	1	0	0	X	4

2023 Korean Curling Championships
(South Korea)
Park Jong-duk
5th Korean Championship title

=== Final standings ===
Place	Team	Skip
1st place, gold medalist(s)	Gangwon Province	Park Jong-duk
2nd place, silver medalist(s)	Seoul City Hall	Jeong Byeong-jin
3rd place, bronze medalist(s)	Gyeongbuk Sports Council	Kim Soo-hyuk
4	Bongmyeong High School	Moon Hyeon
5	Uiseong-gun Office	Lee Jae-beom
6	Chuncheon Motors	Kim Hak-jun

== Women ==
=== Teams ===
The teams are listed as follows:

Team	Skip	Third	Second	Lead	Alternate	Locale
Bongmyeong High School	Park Seo-jin	Shim Yu-jeong	Song Da-bin	Jeong Anah	Yoon Ji-min	Cheongju
Chuncheon City Hall	Ha Seung-youn	Kim Hye-rin	Yang Tae-i	Kim Su-jin		Chuncheon
Gangneung City Hall	Kim Eun-jung	Kim Kyeong-ae	Kim Cho-hi	Kim Seon-yeong	Kim Yeong-mi	Gangneung
Gyeongbuk Association	Kim Min-seo	Bang Yu-jin	Kim Hye-jeong	Park Han-byul		Uiseong
Gyeonggi Province	Gim Eun-ji	Kim Min-ji	Kim Su-ji	Seol Ye-eun	Seol Ye-ji	Uijeongbu
Jeonbuk Province	Kim Ji-soo	Jeong Jae-hee	Song Yu-jin	Shin Eun-jin		Jeonbuk
Seoul City Hall	Park You-been	Lee Eun-chae	Yang Seung-hee	Kim Ji-yoon		Seoul
Songhyun High School	Kang Bo-bae	Jo Ju-hee	Lee Su-bin	Cheon Hee-seo	Hwang Ye-ji	Uijeongbu
Uiseong County Office	Jeong Min-jae	Kim Su-hyeon	Ahn Jeong-yeon	Kang Min-hyo		Uiseong

=== Round 1 ===
The first round of the championship was held from June 22 to 27. The top four teams overall advanced to the second round.

==== Round robin standings ====
Final Round Robin Standings

Key
Teams to Second Round

Team	Skip	W	L	W–L	PF	PA	EW	EL	BE	SE	DSC
Gyeonggi Province	Gim Eun-ji	8	0	–	54	31	34	25	11	8	31.7
Chuncheon City Hall	Ha Seung-youn	6	2	1–0	61	38	32	29	7	7	25.4
Gangneung City Hall	Kim Eun-jung	6	2	0–1	63	33	34	23	8	13	20.7
Gyeongbuk Association	Kim Min-seo	4	4	–	49	45	32	29	3	9	50.5
Seoul City Hall	Park You-been	3	5	1–0	44	53	31	35	5	10	52.1
Jeonbuk Province	Kim Ji-soo	3	5	0–1	39	64	29	35	2	6	53.8
Uiseong County Office	Jeong Min-jae	2	6	1–1	42	57	29	36	5	3	37.9
Bongmyeong High School	Park Seo-jin	2	6	1–1	45	54	29	34	2	7	40.8
Songhyun High School	Kang Bo-bae	2	6	1–1	40	62	28	32	9	9	42.4

==== Round robin results ====
All draws are listed in Korea Standard Time (UTC+09:00).

===== Draw 1 =====
Thursday, June 22, 9:00 am

Sheet A	1	2	3	4	5	6	7	8	9	10	Final
Bongmyeong High School (S. Park)	0	0	1	0	0	0	1	1	0	X	3
Chuncheon City Hall (Ha) 🔨	0	1	0	1	2	2	0	0	2	X	8

Sheet B	1	2	3	4	5	6	7	8	9	10	Final
Gyeongbuk Association (M. Kim)	0	0	1	0	1	0	0	0	1	0	3
Gyeonggi Province (Gim) 🔨	1	0	0	0	0	0	0	2	0	1	4

Sheet C	1	2	3	4	5	6	7	8	9	10	Final
Seoul City Hall (Y. Park)	0	1	0	2	0	0	0	1	1	3	8
Jeonbuk Province (J. Kim) 🔨	1	0	1	0	2	0	0	0	0	0	4

Sheet D	1	2	3	4	5	6	7	8	9	10	Final
Songhyun High School (Kang) 🔨	0	0	0	2	0	1	2	2	0	X	7
Uiseong County Office (Jeong)	0	0	0	0	2	0	0	0	2	X	4

===== Draw 3 =====
Thursday, June 22, 7:00 pm

Sheet A	1	2	3	4	5	6	7	8	9	10	Final
Gyeongbuk Association (M. Kim)	1	0	1	0	2	0	0	2	0	1	7
Uiseong County Office (Jeong) 🔨	0	1	0	1	0	4	0	0	0	0	6

Sheet B	1	2	3	4	5	6	7	8	9	10	Final
Gangneung City Hall (E. Kim)	0	0	1	0	1	4	0	0	2	X	8
Seoul City Hall (Y. Park) 🔨	0	2	0	2	0	0	1	1	0	X	6

Sheet D	1	2	3	4	5	6	7	8	9	10	Final
Jeonbuk Province (J. Kim)	0	0	0	0	1	0	X	X	X	X	1
Chuncheon City Hall (Ha) 🔨	0	3	2	3	0	2	X	X	X	X	10

Sheet E	1	2	3	4	5	6	7	8	9	10	Final
Bongmyeong High School (S. Park)	0	1	0	1	0	0	2	0	0	0	4
Gyeonggi Province (Gim) 🔨	2	0	1	0	1	1	0	0	0	1	6

===== Draw 5 =====
Friday, June 23, 2:00 pm

Sheet B	1	2	3	4	5	6	7	8	9	10	Final
Uiseong County Office (Jeong) 🔨	1	0	1	0	0	1	0	2	0	1	6
Jeonbuk Province (J. Kim)	0	2	0	1	1	0	2	0	1	0	7

Sheet C	1	2	3	4	5	6	7	8	9	10	Final
Gyeonggi Province (Gim) 🔨	0	0	1	0	0	3	0	1	3	X	8
Seoul City Hall (Y. Park)	0	0	0	1	1	0	3	0	0	X	5

Sheet D	1	2	3	4	5	6	7	8	9	10	Final
Gangneung City Hall (E. Kim) 🔨	3	1	0	2	0	3	1	X	X	X	10
Bongmyeong High School (S. Park)	0	0	1	0	1	0	0	X	X	X	2

Sheet E	1	2	3	4	5	6	7	8	9	10	Final
Chuncheon City Hall (Ha)	2	1	0	0	6	0	2	0	2	X	13
Songhyun High School (Kang) 🔨	0	0	1	3	0	1	0	1	0	X	6

===== Draw 6 =====
Saturday, June 24, 9:00 am

Sheet A	1	2	3	4	5	6	7	8	9	10	Final
Gyeonggi Province (Gim)	0	0	0	0	3	0	0	1	0	2	6
Gangneung City Hall (E. Kim) 🔨	0	0	0	1	0	2	0	0	2	0	5

Sheet C	1	2	3	4	5	6	7	8	9	10	Final
Songhyun High School (Kang)	0	2	0	0	1	0	0	0	0	X	3
Bongmyeong High School (S. Park) 🔨	0	0	2	0	0	0	1	5	2	X	10

Sheet D	1	2	3	4	5	6	7	8	9	10	Final
Gyeongbuk Association (M. Kim) 🔨	1	0	3	2	0	2	4	X	X	X	12
Jeonbuk Province (J. Kim)	0	2	0	0	2	0	0	X	X	X	4

Sheet E	1	2	3	4	5	6	7	8	9	10	11	Final
Uiseong County Office (Jeong) 🔨	0	0	1	0	1	2	1	0	0	0	1	6
Seoul City Hall (Y. Park)	0	0	0	1	0	0	0	1	2	1	0	5

===== Draw 8 =====
Saturday, June 24, 7:00 pm

Sheet A	1	2	3	4	5	6	7	8	9	10	Final
Songhyun High School (Kang) 🔨	0	0	1	2	0	0	1	0	1	2	7
Seoul City Hall (Y. Park)	0	0	0	0	1	1	0	2	0	0	4

Sheet B	1	2	3	4	5	6	7	8	9	10	Final
Bongmyeong High School (S. Park)	0	1	0	1	0	0	1	0	2	1	6
Uiseong County Office (Jeong) 🔨	2	0	2	0	0	2	0	2	0	0	8

Sheet C	1	2	3	4	5	6	7	8	9	10	Final
Gyeongbuk Association (M. Kim)	0	0	1	0	2	0	1	0	1	0	5
Chuncheon City Hall (Ha) 🔨	0	2	0	2	0	2	0	0	0	1	7

Sheet E	1	2	3	4	5	6	7	8	9	10	Final
Jeonbuk Province (J. Kim) 🔨	0	0	0	2	1	0	1	0	1	0	5
Gangneung City Hall (E. Kim)	0	1	2	0	0	1	0	2	0	3	9

===== Draw 10 =====
Sunday, June 25, 2:00 pm

Sheet B	1	2	3	4	5	6	7	8	9	10	Final
Chuncheon City Hall (Ha)	0	0	2	1	0	0	1	0	0	3	7
Gangneung City Hall (E. Kim) 🔨	0	2	0	0	0	1	0	3	0	0	6

Sheet C	1	2	3	4	5	6	7	8	9	10	Final
Uiseong County Office (Jeong)	0	0	2	0	1	0	1	1	0	0	5
Gyeonggi Province (Gim) 🔨	1	2	0	1	0	2	0	0	0	2	8

Sheet D	1	2	3	4	5	6	7	8	9	10	Final
Seoul City Hall (Y. Park)	0	0	2	0	1	0	0	0	X	X	3
Bongmyeong High School (S. Park) 🔨	4	1	0	1	0	3	1	1	X	X	11

Sheet E	1	2	3	4	5	6	7	8	9	10	Final
Songhyun High School (Kang) 🔨	1	0	0	2	0	1	1	0	1	0	6
Gyeongbuk Association (M. Kim)	0	3	0	0	1	0	0	2	0	1	7

===== Draw 11 =====
Monday, June 26, 9:00 am

Sheet B	1	2	3	4	5	6	7	8	9	10	Final
Jeonbuk Province (J. Kim) 🔨	2	0	1	0	1	1	1	1	0	X	7
Bongmyeong High School (S. Park)	0	1	0	3	0	0	0	0	1	X	5

Sheet C	1	2	3	4	5	6	7	8	9	10	Final
Gangneung City Hall (E. Kim)	2	0	0	1	0	1	2	3	X	X	9
Gyeongbuk Association (M. Kim) 🔨	0	1	0	0	1	0	0	0	X	X	2

Sheet D	1	2	3	4	5	6	7	8	9	10	Final
Gyeonggi Province (Gim) 🔨	0	3	1	0	1	0	1	3	X	X	9
Songhyun High School (Kang)	1	0	0	1	0	1	0	0	X	X	3

Sheet E	1	2	3	4	5	6	7	8	9	10	Final
Uiseong County Office (Jeong) 🔨	1	0	0	1	0	1	0	1	X	X	4
Chuncheon City Hall (Ha)	0	0	3	0	3	0	2	0	X	X	8

===== Draw 13 =====
Monday, June 26, 7:00 pm

Sheet A	1	2	3	4	5	6	7	8	9	10	Final
Gangneung City Hall (E. Kim)	0	0	1	0	0	0	3	1	2	X	7
Songhyun High School (Kang) 🔨	0	0	0	1	0	1	0	0	0	X	2

Sheet B	1	2	3	4	5	6	7	8	9	10	11	Final
Seoul City Hall (Y. Park)	0	0	1	0	1	1	0	1	1	0	3	8
Chuncheon City Hall (Ha) 🔨	0	1	0	2	0	0	1	0	0	1	0	5

Sheet D	1	2	3	4	5	6	7	8	9	10	Final
Bongmyeong High School (S. Park) 🔨	1	0	0	1	0	2	0	0	X	X	4
Gyeongbuk Association (M. Kim)	0	2	2	0	3	0	1	1	X	X	9

Sheet E	1	2	3	4	5	6	7	8	9	10	Final
Gyeonggi Province (Gim) 🔨	2	1	1	0	1	0	3	0	X	X	8
Jeonbuk Province (J. Kim)	0	0	0	1	0	1	0	1	X	X	3

===== Draw 15 =====
Tuesday, June 27, 2:00 pm

Sheet A	1	2	3	4	5	6	7	8	9	10	11	Final
Seoul City Hall (Y. Park)	0	0	2	0	0	0	0	1	0	1	1	5
Gyeongbuk Association (M. Kim) 🔨	1	0	0	0	1	1	0	0	1	0	0	4

Sheet B	1	2	3	4	5	6	7	8	9	10	Final
Songhyun High School (Kang)	0	0	3	0	0	2	0	1	0	X	6
Jeonbuk Province (J. Kim) 🔨	0	3	0	2	1	0	1	0	1	X	8

Sheet C	1	2	3	4	5	6	7	8	9	10	Final
Chuncheon City Hall (Ha)	0	0	0	1	0	1	0	0	1	X	3
Gyeonggi Province (Gim) 🔨	0	2	1	0	1	0	0	1	0	X	5

Sheet D	1	2	3	4	5	6	7	8	9	10	Final
Gangneung City Hall (E. Kim) 🔨	0	2	0	2	1	0	2	0	2	X	9
Uiseong County Office (Jeong)	0	0	1	0	0	0	0	2	0	X	3

=== Round 2 ===
The second round of the championship was held from June 28 to 29. The top two teams advanced to the best-of-five final round.

==== Round robin standings ====
Final Round Robin Standings

Key
Teams to Third Round

Team	Skip	W	L	W–L	PF	PA	EW	EL	BE	SE
Gyeonggi Province	Gim Eun-ji	3	0	–	22	8	12	8	3	4
Gangneung City Hall	Kim Eun-jung	2	1	–	21	13	10	9	0	2
Chuncheon City Hall	Ha Seung-youn	1	2	–	18	16	12	10	5	3
Gyeongbuk Association	Kim Min-seo	0	3	–	7	31	6	13	1	0

==== Round robin results ====
All draws are listed in Korea Standard Time (UTC+09:00).

===== Draw 17 =====
Wednesday, June 28, 9:00 am

Sheet B	1	2	3	4	5	6	7	8	9	10	Final
Gangneung City Hall (E. Kim)	0	0	1	0	0	3	0	4	X	X	8
Chuncheon City Hall (Ha) 🔨	0	0	0	1	1	0	1	0	X	X	3

Sheet D	1	2	3	4	5	6	7	8	9	10	Final
Gyeonggi Province (Gim) 🔨	0	2	0	2	0	5	1	X	X	X	10
Gyeongbuk Association (M. Kim)	0	0	1	0	0	0	0	X	X	X	1

===== Draw 19 =====
Wednesday, June 28, 7:00 pm

Sheet C	1	2	3	4	5	6	7	8	9	10	Final
Chuncheon City Hall (Ha) 🔨	0	2	0	4	0	1	0	1	3	X	11
Gyeongbuk Association (M. Kim)	0	0	1	0	1	0	1	0	0	X	3

Sheet D	1	2	3	4	5	6	7	8	9	10	Final
Gyeonggi Province (Gim) 🔨	0	1	0	1	0	0	2	3	0	X	7
Gangneung City Hall (E. Kim)	0	0	1	0	1	0	0	0	1	X	3

===== Draw 20 =====
Thursday, June 29, 11:00 am

Sheet C	1	2	3	4	5	6	7	8	9	10	Final
Chuncheon City Hall (Ha)	0	1	0	1	1	0	0	0	0	1	4
Gyeonggi Province (Gim) 🔨	1	0	1	0	0	2	0	1	0	0	5

Sheet D	1	2	3	4	5	6	7	8	9	10	Final
Gyeongbuk Association (M. Kim)	0	2	0	1	0	0	X	X	X	X	3
Gangneung City Hall (E. Kim) 🔨	4	0	2	0	2	2	X	X	X	X	10

=== Round 3 ===
The third round of the championship was held from June 29 to 30. The teams' head-to-head games in rounds one and two were counted towards their best-of-five score.

Best-of-five
1	Gyeonggi Province	6	7	3	9	X
2	Gangneung City Hall	5	3	6	6	X

==== Draw 21 ====
Thursday, June 29, 6:00 pm

Sheet D	1	2	3	4	5	6	7	8	9	10	Final
Gyeonggi Province (Gim) 🔨	1	0	0	1	0	1	0	0	0	0	3
Gangneung City Hall (E. Kim)	0	1	0	0	0	0	1	1	2	1	6

==== Draw 22 ====
Friday, June 30, 11:00 am

Sheet B	1	2	3	4	5	6	7	8	9	10	Final
Gyeonggi Province (Gim) 🔨	2	2	1	0	0	2	0	1	0	1	9
Gangneung City Hall (E. Kim)	0	0	0	1	1	0	1	0	3	0	6

2023 Korean Curling Championships
(South Korea)
Gim Eun-ji
5th Korean Championship title

=== Final standings ===
Place	Team	Skip
1st place, gold medalist(s)	Gyeonggi Province	Gim Eun-ji
2nd place, silver medalist(s)	Gangneung City Hall	Kim Eun-jung
3rd place, bronze medalist(s)	Chuncheon City Hall	Ha Seung-youn
4	Gyeongbuk Association	Kim Min-seo
5	Seoul City Hall	Park You-been
6	Jeonbuk Province	Kim Ji-soo
7	Uiseong County Office	Jeong Min-jae
8	Bongmyeong High School	Park Seo-jin
9	Songhyun High School	Kang Bo-bae

== See also ==
- 2023 Korean Mixed Doubles Curling Championship
