= IArc =

iArc

Practice information
- Key architects: Kerl Yoo, Chairman; Jeongim Kim; Tesoc Hah RIBA

Significant works and honors
- Buildings: Seoul City Hall; Jeonnam Building
- Awards: AIA award and KIA award

iArc (iArc Architects) is an internationally awarded architectural practice based in Seoul, South Korea, led by three partners; Kerl Yoo AIA, Jeongim Kim, and Tesoc Hah RIBA. It creates new topography in Korean architectural design scene. One of their newest projects was the new Seoul City Hall.

== Awards ==
Miral School, completed in 1996, was selected one of the best ten examples of Korean architecture in the 20th century by KBS. They have been awarded numerous awards including AIA and KIA award for best architecture.
