= 2021 Pacific-Asia Curling Championships =

- Host city: Almaty, Kazakhstan
- Arena: Almaty Arena
- Dates: November 7–13
- Men's winner: South Korea
- Skip: Kim Chang-min
- Third: Kim Soo-hyuk
- Second: Jeon Jae-ik
- Lead: Kim Hak-kyun
- Coach: Yoon So-min
- Finalist: Japan (Morozumi)
- Women's winner: Japan
- Skip: Sayaka Yoshimura
- Third: Kaho Onodera
- Second: Anna Ohmiya
- Lead: Yumie Funayama
- Coach: Masatsugu Odaka
- Finalist: South Korea (Kim)

The 2021 Pacific-Asia Curling Championships was held from November 7 to 13 at the Almaty Arena in Almaty, Kazakhstan. The top men's team and the top two women's teams qualified for the 2022 World Men's Curling Championship and 2022 World Women's Curling Championship respectively. The next two placed teams of each gender qualified for the World Qualification Event, for a second chance to qualify for the World Curling Championships.

== Men ==
=== Teams ===
The teams are listed as follows:

Chinese Taipei	Hong Kong	Japan	Kazakhstan
Skip: Lin Ting-li; Third: Nelson Wang; Second: Yin Liu Luis; Lead: Cheng Kai-wen; Alternate: Victor Lee	Skip: Jason Chang; Third: Justin Chen; Second: Woody Cheng; Lead: Harry Yew	Skip: Yusuke Morozumi; Third: Masaki Iwai; Second: Ryotaro Shukuya; Lead: Kosuke Morozumi	Skip: Viktor Kim; Third: Adil Zhumagozha; Second: Aidos Alliyar; Lead: Azizbek Nadirbayev; Alternate: Dmitriy Garagul
Qatar	Saudi Arabia	South Korea	
Skip: Nasser Alyafei; Third: Abdulraham Mohsen; Second: Mouaaz Mlis; Lead: Mohammed Al-Keldi	Skip: Alastair Fyfe; Third: Munir Albeelbisi; Second: Hussain Hagawi; Lead: Suleiman Alaqel	Skip: Kim Chang-min; Third: Kim Soo-hyuk; Second: Jeon Jae-ik; Lead: Kim Hak-kyun	

=== Round-robin standings ===
Final round-robin standings

Key
Teams to Playoffs

Country	Skip	W	L	W–L	DSC
Japan	Yusuke Morozumi	6	0	–	28.09
South Korea	Kim Chang-min	5	1	–	39.14
Kazakhstan	Viktor Kim	3	3	1–1	82.95
Chinese Taipei	Lin Ting-li	3	3	1–1	97.40
Hong Kong	Jason Chang	3	3	1–1	110.59
Qatar	Nasser Alyafei	1	5	–	93.32
Saudi Arabia	Alastair Fyfe	0	6	–	121.92

Round Robin Summary Table
Pos.	Country	Chinese Taipei	Hong Kong	Japan	Kazakhstan	Qatar	Saudi Arabia	South Korea	Record
4	Chinese Taipei	—N/a	9–6	4–11	6–8	11–4	13–5	8–9	3–3
5	Hong Kong	6–9	—	6–12	9–1	8–5	8–3	5–11	3–3
1	Japan	11–4	12–6	—	12–0	15–1	12–0	8–2	6–0
3	Kazakhstan	8–6	1–9	0–12	—	8–7	12–6	1–9	3–3
6	Qatar	4–11	5–8	1–15	7–8	—	9–4	1–14	1–5
7	Saudi Arabia	5–13	3–8	0–12	6–12	4–9	—	3–9	0–6
2	South Korea	9–8	11–5	2–8	9–1	14–1	9–3	—	5–1

=== Round-robin results ===
All draw times are listed in Alma-Ata Time (UTC+06:00).

==== Draw 1 ====
Sunday, November 7, 9:00

Sheet D	1	2	3	4	5	6	7	8	9	10	Final
Japan (Morozumi) 🔨	3	2	0	2	0	1	0	4	0	X	12
Hong Kong (Chang)	0	0	2	0	1	0	2	0	1	X	6

==== Draw 2 ====
Sunday, November 7, 14:00

Sheet E	1	2	3	4	5	6	7	8	9	10	Final
Saudi Arabia (Fyfe)	0	1	0	1	0	1	X	X	X	X	3
South Korea (C. Kim) 🔨	2	0	6	0	1	0	X	X	X	X	9

==== Draw 3 ====
Sunday, November 7, 19:00

Sheet D	1	2	3	4	5	6	7	8	9	10	Final
Chinese Taipei (Lin)	0	2	2	0	0	0	1	0	1	0	6
Kazakhstan (V. Kim) 🔨	1	0	0	0	2	1	0	2	0	2	8

==== Draw 4 ====
Monday, November 8, 9:00

Sheet C	1	2	3	4	5	6	7	8	9	10	Final
South Korea (C. Kim)	0	0	1	0	0	1	X	X	X	X	2
Japan (Morozumi) 🔨	2	1	0	4	1	0	X	X	X	X	8

Sheet D	1	2	3	4	5	6	7	8	9	10	Final
Qatar (Alyafei)	0	3	0	1	1	1	0	2	1	X	9
Saudi Arabia (Fyfe) 🔨	1	0	1	0	0	0	2	0	0	X	4

Sheet E	1	2	3	4	5	6	7	8	9	10	Final
Hong Kong (Chang)	0	0	0	1	1	0	1	0	3	0	6
Chinese Taipei (Lin) 🔨	2	1	1	0	0	1	0	3	0	1	9

==== Draw 6 ====
Monday, November 8, 19:00

Sheet A	1	2	3	4	5	6	7	8	9	10	Final
Hong Kong (Chang) 🔨	3	1	1	0	0	1	1	1	0	X	8
Saudi Arabia (Fyfe)	0	0	0	1	1	0	0	0	1	X	3

Sheet C	1	2	3	4	5	6	7	8	9	10	Final
Qatar (Alyafei) 🔨	1	0	1	0	2	0	0	0	2	1	7
Kazakhstan (V. Kim)	0	0	0	1	0	4	1	2	0	0	8

Sheet E	1	2	3	4	5	6	7	8	9	10	Final
Chinese Taipei (Lin)	0	1	0	1	0	1	0	1	X	X	4
Japan (Morozumi) 🔨	2	0	6	0	1	0	2	0	X	X	11

==== Draw 8 ====
Tuesday, November 9, 14:00

Sheet A	1	2	3	4	5	6	7	8	9	10	Final
Qatar (Alyafei)	0	0	1	0	0	0	X	X	X	X	1
South Korea (C. Kim) 🔨	6	3	0	1	2	2	X	X	X	X	14

Sheet C	1	2	3	4	5	6	7	8	9	10	Final
Saudi Arabia (Fyfe)	0	0	3	0	1	0	1	0	X	X	5
Chinese Taipei (Lin) 🔨	3	1	0	1	0	5	0	3	X	X	13

Sheet E	1	2	3	4	5	6	7	8	9	10	Final
Japan (Morozumi) 🔨	0	1	2	0	4	1	1	2	1	X	12
Kazakhstan (V. Kim)	0	0	0	0	0	0	0	0	0	X	0

==== Draw 10 ====
Wednesday, November 10, 9:00

Sheet A	1	2	3	4	5	6	7	8	9	10	Final
Saudi Arabia (Fyfe) 🔨	0	1	0	0	2	1	0	1	1	0	6
Kazakhstan (V. Kim)	1	0	3	1	0	0	2	0	0	5	12

Sheet B	1	2	3	4	5	6	7	8	9	10	Final
Chinese Taipei (Lin)	1	0	4	1	0	0	0	5	X	X	11
Qatar (Alyafei) 🔨	0	1	0	0	1	1	1	0	X	X	4

Sheet C	1	2	3	4	5	6	7	8	9	10	Final
Hong Kong (Chang) 🔨	0	0	4	0	0	1	0	0	X	X	5
South Korea (C. Kim)	1	2	0	4	1	0	2	1	X	X	11

==== Draw 12 ====
Wednesday, November 10, 19:00

Sheet B	1	2	3	4	5	6	7	8	9	10	Final
Saudi Arabia (Fyfe)	0	0	0	0	0	0	X	X	X	X	0
Japan (Morozumi) 🔨	2	2	2	3	1	2	X	X	X	X	12

Sheet D	1	2	3	4	5	6	7	8	9	10	Final
Kazakhstan (V. Kim)	0	0	0	0	0	1	X	X	X	X	1
South Korea (C. Kim) 🔨	2	1	1	3	2	0	X	X	X	X	9

Sheet E	1	2	3	4	5	6	7	8	9	10	Final
Qatar (Alyafei) 🔨	0	0	1	1	0	0	2	0	1	0	5
Hong Kong (Chang)	1	1	0	0	1	3	0	1	0	1	8

==== Draw 14 ====
Thursday, November 11, 14:00

Sheet A	1	2	3	4	5	6	7	8	9	10	Final
Japan (Morozumi) 🔨	5	3	0	4	2	1	X	X	X	X	15
Qatar (Alyafei)	0	0	1	0	0	0	X	X	X	X	1

Sheet B	1	2	3	4	5	6	7	8	9	10	Final
South Korea (C. Kim) 🔨	2	0	0	3	0	0	3	0	1	0	9
Chinese Taipei (Lin)	0	1	1	0	2	2	0	1	0	1	8

Sheet C	1	2	3	4	5	6	7	8	9	10	Final
Kazakhstan (V. Kim)	0	0	0	0	0	1	0	X	X	X	1
Hong Kong (Chang) 🔨	2	2	2	1	1	0	1	X	X	X	9

=== Playoffs ===
Semifinals
1	Japan	8
4	Chinese Taipei	3
2	South Korea	7
3	Kazakhstan	4

Gold medal game
1	Japan	5
2	South Korea	9

Bronze medal game
4	Chinese Taipei	9
3	Kazakhstan	8

==== Semifinals ====
Friday, November 12, 9:00

Sheet C	1	2	3	4	5	6	7	8	9	10	Final
South Korea (C. Kim) 🔨	0	2	0	0	3	0	0	2	0	X	7
Kazakhstan (V. Kim)	0	0	1	1	0	1	0	0	1	X	4

Friday, November 12, 14:00

Sheet C	1	2	3	4	5	6	7	8	9	10	Final
Japan (Morozumi) 🔨	1	0	3	0	2	0	2	0	X	X	8
Chinese Taipei (Lin)	0	0	0	1	0	1	0	1	X	X	3

==== Bronze medal game ====
Saturday, November 13, 9:00

Sheet D	1	2	3	4	5	6	7	8	9	10	11	Final
Chinese Taipei (Lin) 🔨	0	1	0	3	0	1	0	2	0	1	1	9
Kazakhstan (V. Kim)	1	0	1	0	2	0	2	0	2	0	0	8

==== Gold medal game ====
Saturday, November 13, 14:00

Sheet C	1	2	3	4	5	6	7	8	9	10	Final
Japan (Morozumi) 🔨	2	0	0	0	0	1	0	2	0	X	5
South Korea (C. Kim)	0	1	1	3	1	0	3	0	0	X	9

==== Final standings ====
Key
Team Advances to the 2022 World Men's Curling Championship
Team Advances to the 2022 World Qualification Event

Place	Team
1st place, gold medalist(s)	South Korea
2nd place, silver medalist(s)	Japan
3rd place, bronze medalist(s)	Chinese Taipei
4	Kazakhstan
5	Hong Kong
6	Qatar
7	Saudi Arabia

== Women ==
=== Teams ===
The teams are listed as follows:

Hong Kong	Japan	Kazakhstan	South Korea
Skip: Ling-Yue Hung; Third: Ada Shang; Second: Ashura Wong; Lead: Pianpian Hu	Skip: Sayaka Yoshimura; Third: Kaho Onodera; Second: Anna Ohmiya; Lead: Yumie Funayama	Skip: Angelina Ebauyer; Third: Sitora Alliyarova; Second: Tilsimay Alliyarova; Lead: Regina Ebauyer; Alternate: Ayazhan Zhumabek	Skip: Kim Eun-jung; Third: Kim Kyeong-ae; Second: Kim Cho-hi; Lead: Kim Seon-yeong; Alternate: Kim Yeong-mi

=== Round-robin standings ===
Final round-robin standings

Key
Teams to Playoffs

Country	Skip	W	L	W–L	DSC
Japan	Sayaka Yoshimura	5	1	1–1	60.90
South Korea	Kim Eun-jung	5	1	1–1	66.34
Kazakhstan	Angelina Ebauyer	2	4	–	117.38
Hong Kong	Ling-Yue Hung	0	6	–	146.45

Round Robin Summary Table
Pos.	Country	Hong Kong		Japan		Kazakhstan		South Korea		Record
Pos.	Country	1st	2nd	1st	2nd	1st	2nd	1st	2nd	Record
4	Hong Kong	—		7–10	5–11	6–11	6–9	2–10	1–9	0–6
1	Japan	10–7	11–5	—		11–3	7–2	9–5	6–8	5–1
3	Kazakhstan	11–6	9–6	3–11	2–7	—		2–12	4–9	2–4
2	South Korea	10–2	9–1	5–9	8–6	12–2	9–4	—		5–1

=== Round-robin results ===
All draw times are listed in Alma-Ata Time (UTC+06:00).

==== Draw 1 ====
Sunday, November 7, 9:00

Sheet C	1	2	3	4	5	6	7	8	9	10	Final
Japan (Yoshimura)	0	0	3	1	0	4	0	2	0	X	10
Hong Kong (Hung) 🔨	3	1	0	0	1	0	1	0	1	X	7

==== Draw 2 ====
Sunday, November 7, 14:00

Sheet D	1	2	3	4	5	6	7	8	9	10	Final
Kazakhstan (Ebauyer) 🔨	1	1	0	0	0	0	0	X	X	X	2
South Korea (Kim)	0	0	4	1	2	4	1	X	X	X	12

==== Draw 3 ====
Sunday, November 7, 19:00

Sheet E	1	2	3	4	5	6	7	8	9	10	Final
Japan (Yoshimura) 🔨	1	2	0	4	1	0	3	X	X	X	11
Kazakhstan (Ebauyer)	0	0	2	0	0	1	0	X	X	X	3

==== Draw 4 ====
Monday, November 8, 9:00

Sheet A	1	2	3	4	5	6	7	8	9	10	Final
Japan (Yoshimura)	0	2	0	1	1	0	2	0	3	X	9
South Korea (Kim) 🔨	1	0	2	0	0	1	0	1	0	X	5

==== Draw 5 ====
Monday, November 8, 14:00

Sheet D	1	2	3	4	5	6	7	8	9	10	Final
Hong Kong (Hung) 🔨	1	1	0	0	2	0	2	0	0	X	6
Kazakhstan (Ebauyer)	0	0	1	2	0	4	0	2	2	X	11

==== Draw 7 ====
Tuesday, November 9, 9:00

Sheet E	1	2	3	4	5	6	7	8	9	10	Final
South Korea (Kim) 🔨	2	0	2	0	1	2	1	2	X	X	10
Hong Kong (Hung)	0	1	0	1	0	0	0	0	X	X	2

==== Draw 9 ====
Tuesday, November 9, 19:00

Sheet D	1	2	3	4	5	6	7	8	9	10	Final
South Korea (Kim)	0	3	1	0	0	1	2	0	0	1	8
Japan (Yoshimura) 🔨	2	0	0	2	0	0	0	1	1	0	6

==== Draw 11 ====
Wednesday, November 10, 14:00

Sheet A	1	2	3	4	5	6	7	8	9	10	Final
Hong Kong (Hung)	0	1	0	3	0	1	0	0	X	X	5
Japan (Yoshimura) 🔨	2	0	3	0	1	0	1	4	X	X	11

Sheet B	1	2	3	4	5	6	7	8	9	10	Final
South Korea (Kim)	1	0	3	2	0	1	0	2	X	X	9
Kazakhstan (Ebauyer) 🔨	0	1	0	0	1	0	2	0	X	X	4

==== Draw 12 ====
Wednesday, November 10, 19:00

Sheet C	1	2	3	4	5	6	7	8	9	10	Final
Kazakhstan (Ebauyer)	0	0	1	0	0	1	X	X	X	X	2
Japan (Yoshimura) 🔨	3	1	0	2	1	0	X	X	X	X	7

==== Draw 13 ====
Thursday, November 11, 9:00

Sheet B	1	2	3	4	5	6	7	8	9	10	Final
Kazakhstan (Ebauyer)	0	2	2	0	0	3	0	1	1	X	9
Hong Kong (Hung) 🔨	1	0	0	2	2	0	1	0	0	X	6

==== Draw 15 ====
Thursday, November 11, 19:00

Sheet C	1	2	3	4	5	6	7	8	9	10	Final
Hong Kong (Hung)	0	0	0	0	0	1	X	X	X	X	1
South Korea (Kim) 🔨	1	2	2	1	3	0	X	X	X	X	9

=== Playoffs ===
Semifinal			Gold medal game
			1	Japan	6
2	South Korea	10	2	South Korea	5
3	Kazakhstan	2

==== Semifinals ====
Saturday, November 13, 9:00

Sheet C	1	2	3	4	5	6	7	8	9	10	Final
South Korea (Kim) 🔨	1	1	1	2	0	3	0	2	X	X	10
Kazakhstan (Ebauyer)	0	0	0	0	1	0	1	0	X	X	2

==== Gold medal game ====
Saturday, November 13, 14:00

Sheet D	1	2	3	4	5	6	7	8	9	10	Final
Japan (Yoshimura) 🔨	0	0	1	1	0	1	0	1	0	2	6
South Korea (Kim)	1	0	0	0	3	0	0	0	1	0	5

==== Final standings ====
Key
Team Advances to the 2022 World Women's Curling Championship
Team Advances to the 2022 World Qualification Event

Place	Team
1st place, gold medalist(s)	Japan
2nd place, silver medalist(s)	South Korea
3rd place, bronze medalist(s)	Kazakhstan
4	Hong Kong
