= Kim Hak-kyun (curler) =

South Korean curler (born 1996)

- Curler
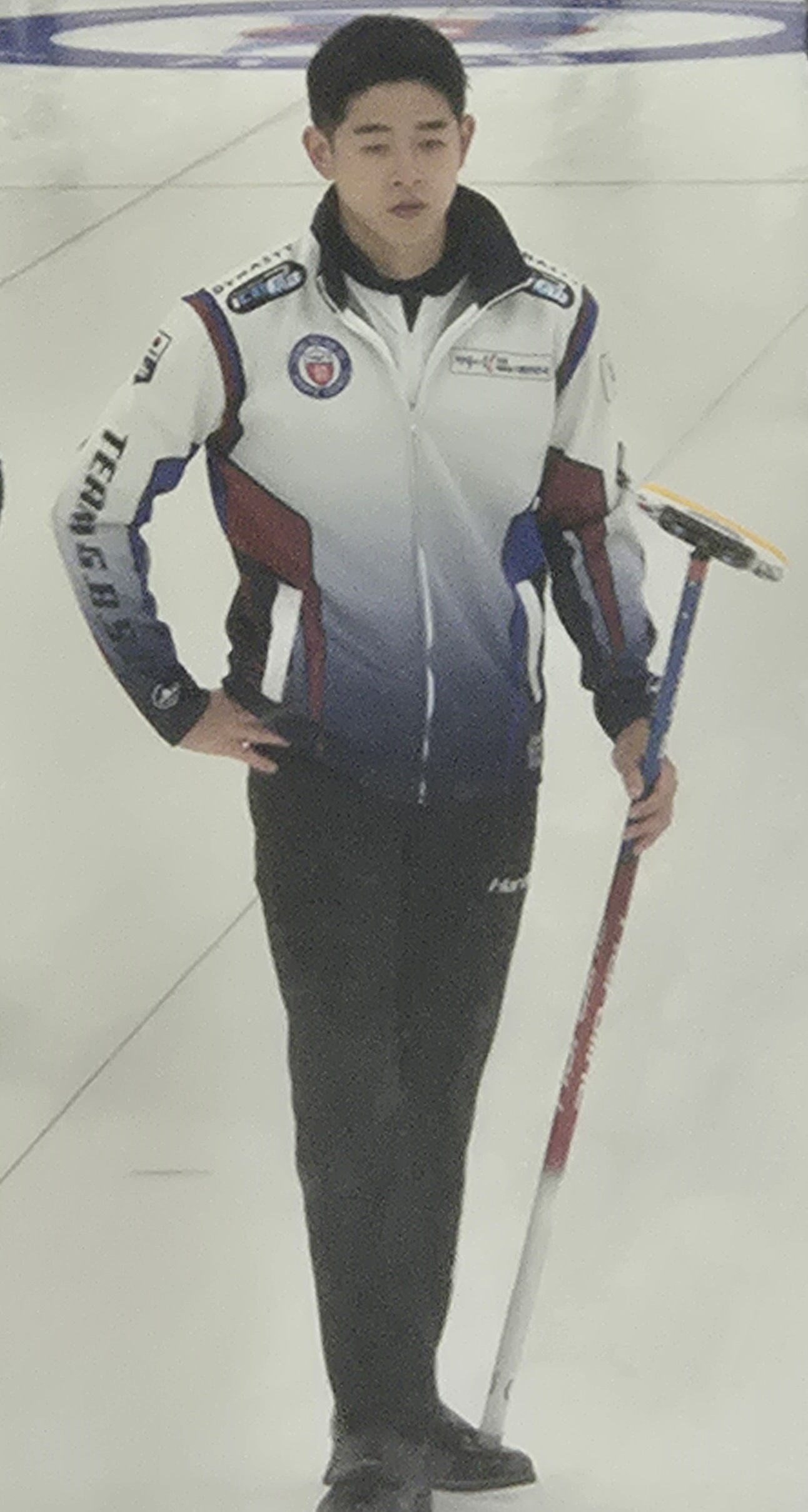
- Kim at the 2025 Capital Curling Fall Open
- Born: March 12, 1996 (age 30)

Team
- Curling club: Uiseong CC, Uiseong, KOR
- Skip: Kim Soo-hyuk
- Third: Kim Chang-min
- Second: Yoo Min-hyeon
- Lead: Kim Hak-kyun
- Alternate: Jeon Jae-ik
- Mixed doubles partner: Ha Seung-youn

Curling career
- Member Association: South Korea
- World Championship: 1 (2022)
- Pacific-Asia Championship: 2 (2019, 2021)
- Pan Continental Championship: 1 (2025)
Medal record
Men's curling
Representing South Korea
Pacific-Asia Championships
| Gold medal – first place | 2019 Shenzhen |
| Gold medal – first place | 2021 Almaty |
Representing Chuncheon
Korean Men's Championship
| Bronze medal – third place | 2013 Chuncheon |
Representing Uiseong
Korean Men's Championship
| Gold medal – first place | 2019 Gangneung |
| Gold medal – first place | 2021 Gangneung |
| Gold medal – first place | 2025 Uijeongbu |
| Silver medal – second place | 2020 Gangneung |
| Silver medal – second place | 2022 Jincheon |
| Bronze medal – third place | 2023 Gangneung |
| Bronze medal – third place | 2024 Uijeongbu |

Kim Hak-kyun (born March 12, 1996) is a South Korean curler from Uiseong, South Korea. He currently plays lead on the Gyeongbuk Sports Council curling team skipped by Kim Soo-hyuk. Kim is a two-time Pacific-Asia champion, winning the title in 2019 and 2021 as a member of the Korean team.

== Career ==
Kim joined the Kim Chang-min rink at second for the 2019–20 season. The team also included twin brothers Lee Ki-jeong and Lee Ki-bok playing third and lead respectively. The team did well in their first event together, winning the 2019 Korean Curling Championships by going a perfect 8–0 through the tournament. This qualified them as the Korean National Team for that season, meaning they would represent Korea at both the Pacific-Asia Curling Championships and the World Men's Curling Championship. In tour events, the team was fairly successful as well. They won the 2019 China Open in December 2019, finished runner-up at the Cameron's Brewing Oakville Fall Classic and made the semifinals at both the Medicine Hat Charity Classic and the Changan Ford International Curling Elite. The team was also set to represent South Korea at the 2020 World Men's Curling Championship before the event got cancelled due to the COVID-19 pandemic.

Team Kim played in no tour events during the abbreviated 2020–21 season as there were no events held in South Korea or Asia. They did, however, compete in the 2020 Korean Curling Championships, held November 19 to 24 in Gangneung. The team topped the round robin with a 5–1 record and defeated Jeong Yeong-seok in the 1 vs. 2 page playoff game to advance to the championship final where they once again faced Team Jeong. They could not secure a second national championship, however, dropping the game 12–10 in an extra end. After the season, Kim and skip Kim Chang-min left their team and formed a new team under the Gyeongbuk Athletic Association with Kim Soo-hyuk and Jeon Jae-ik. Kim would play lead on the team, with Jeon at second, Chang-min at third and Soo-hyuk skipping. Chang-min would later become the skip of the team.

The new team competed in their national championship in Summer 2021. The championship was held in three rounds, as it also determined the team that would go on the represent South Korea at the Olympic Qualification Event in attempts to qualify for the 2022 Winter Olympics. Through the championship, Team Kim posted an impressive 11–2 record en route to winning both the first and second rounds. They secured the national title with a 6–5 victory over former teammate Lee Ki-jeong in the second round final.

== Personal life ==
Kim is a full-time curler.

== Teams ==
| Season | Skip | Third | Second | Lead | Alternate |
|---|---|---|---|---|---|
| 2019–20 | Kim Chang-min | Lee Ki-jeong | Kim Hak-kyun | Lee Ki-bok | |
| 2020–21 | Kim Chang-min | Lee Ki-jeong | Kim Hak-kyun | Lee Ki-bok | |
| 2021–22 | Kim Chang-min | Kim Soo-hyuk | Jeon Jae-ik | Kim Hak-kyun | |
| 2022–23 | Kim Chang-min | Kim Soo-hyuk | Seong Se-hyeon | Kim Hak-kyun | Jeon Jae-ik |
| 2023–24 | Kim Soo-hyuk | Kim Chang-min | Kim Hak-kyun | Jeon Jae-ik | |
| 2024–25 | Kim Soo-hyuk | Kim Chang-min | Yoo Min-hyeon | Kim Hak-kyun | Jeon Jae-ik |
| 2025–26 | Kim Soo-hyuk | Kim Chang-min | Yoo Min-hyeon | Kim Hak-kyun | Jeon Jae-ik |
