= Seoul City Hall =

Local government building in South Korea

Coordinates: 37°33′59.06″N 126°58′40.16″E

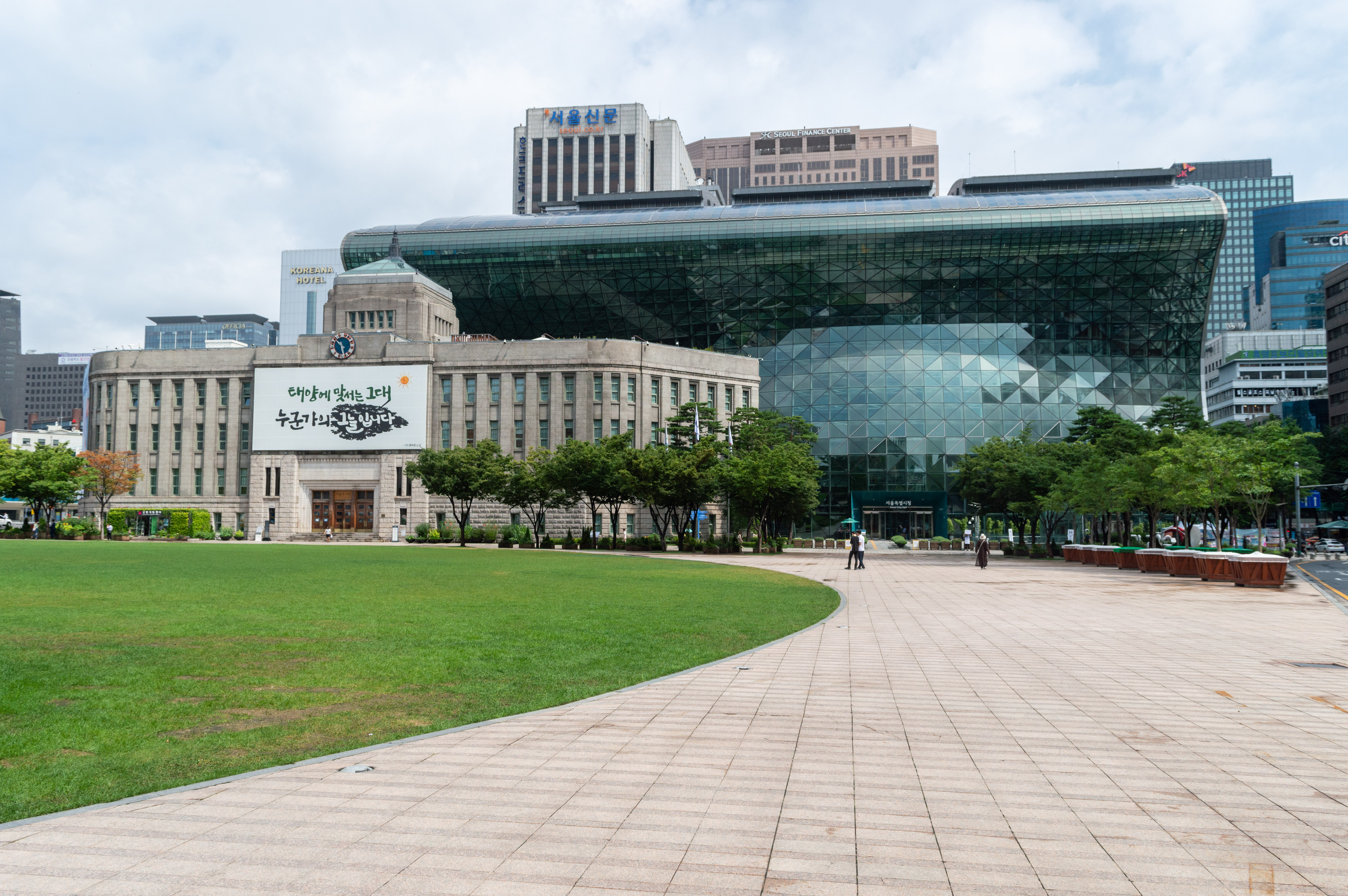
- Seoul City Hall

Korean name
- Hangul: 서울특별시 청사
- Hanja: 서울特別市 廳舍
- RR: Seoul-teukbyeolsi cheongsa
- MR: Sŏul-t'ŭkpyŏlsi ch'ŏngsa

Seoul City Hall (Korean: 서울특별시 청사) is a governmental building for the Seoul Metropolitan Government in South Korea, in charge of the administrative affairs of Seoul. It is located in Taepyeongno, Jung District, at the heart of Seoul. It is connected to City Hall Station on Seoul Subway Line 1, with access to Seoul Subway Line 2 from the same station. In front of the current city hall is the old city hall building, now Seoul Metropolitan Library, and Seoul Plaza.

== History ==
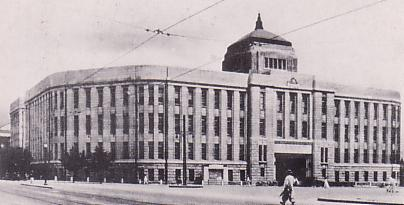
The original City Hall shortly after completion

The former city hall of Seoul was built in 1925, during the Japanese occupation of Korea. It is an example of Imperial Crown Style architecture, and served as city hall from Korea's liberation in 1945, until construction of the modern building in 2008. It now houses the Seoul Metropolitan Library, in front of the current, modern Seoul City Hall building.

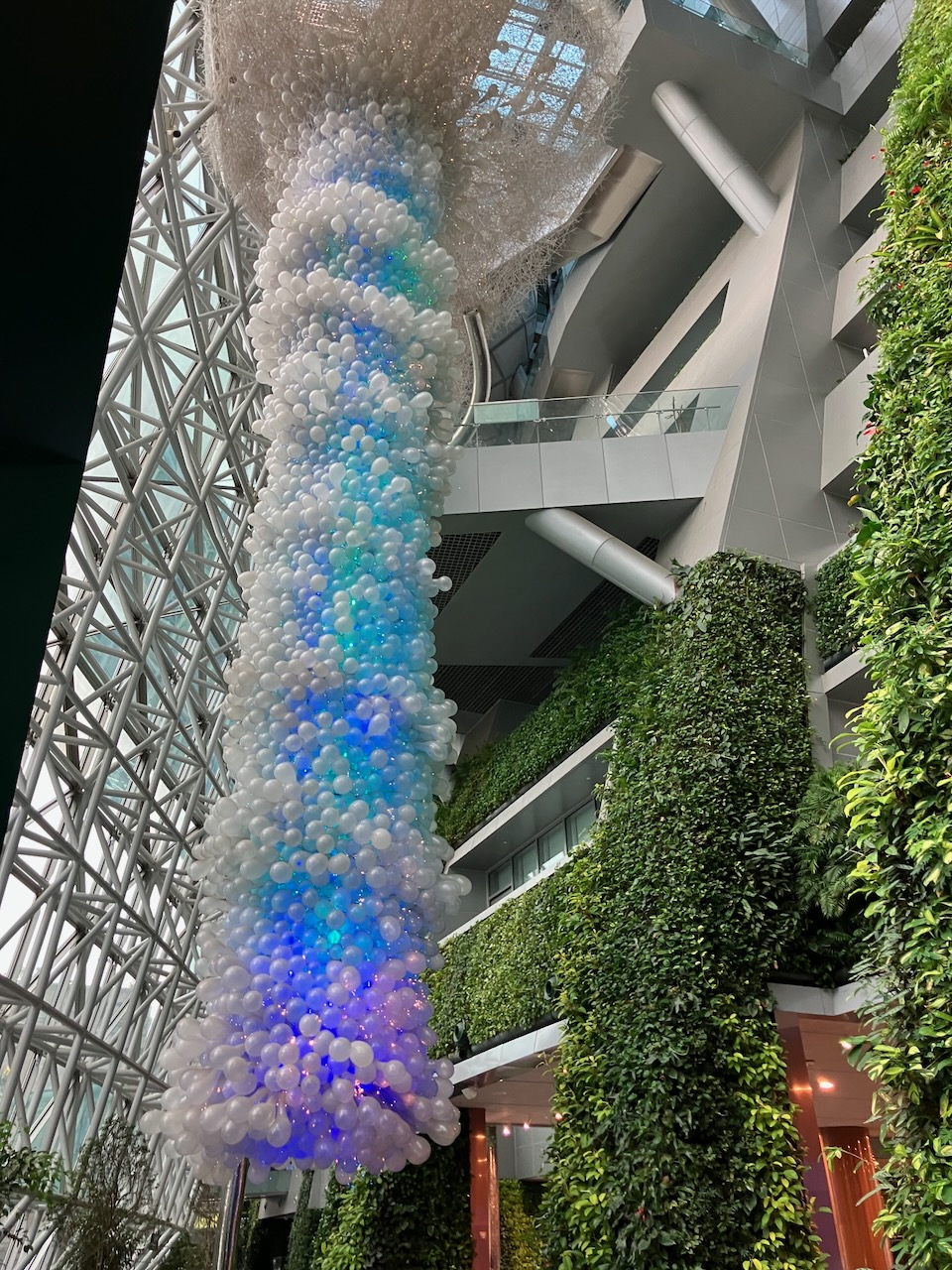
Green Wall and Metaseosa Seobeol art installation inside Seoul City Hall

Following a competition for a new city hall, the jury awarded the commission to Yoo Kerl of iArc on February 18, 2008. Yoo said, "Major keywords for designing the new building are traditions, citizens, future. I analysed low-rise horizontal elements, curvaceousness, and shades of leaves in our traditional architectural characteristics, and I applied these to the design so I can recall comfortable feelings of old things." The design was based in part on the eaves of traditional Korean houses. The building is also designed to be eco-friendly with a double skin facade system and over 25 percent of the energy used in the building from photovoltaic, solar thermal and geothermal sources.

In 2012, the new City Hall was opened to the public on 27 August and the city government moved in on 1 September. The project, which took four years and five months to complete, also includes multipurpose halls and cultural facilities for citizens. The old building, registered as a cultural asset, has been converted into a library, and boasts a collection of more than 200,000 books.

== Green Wall ==
One prominent feature of the Seoul City Hall building is its internal Green Wall, which is an vertical garden wall with over 70,000 plants of 14 different species. The Green Wall spans an area of 1516 square meters and was named in the Guinness World Records as the largest vertical garden in the world in 2013.

== Metaseosa Seobeol ==
Another prominent feature of Seoul City Hall is a large art installation, "Metaseosa Seobeol" by JHEON Soo-cheon. It is made of white balloons in a tornado pattern. It was selected through a public contest and is a symbolic art installation honoring the history of Seoul as a capital city for 2,000 years and its citizens.

== Sky Plaza ==
On the 8th floor of Seoul City Hall is a Sky Plaza Gallery with photo and art exhibitions accessible via a glass elevator.

== Public transportation ==
- City Hall Station (Seoul)

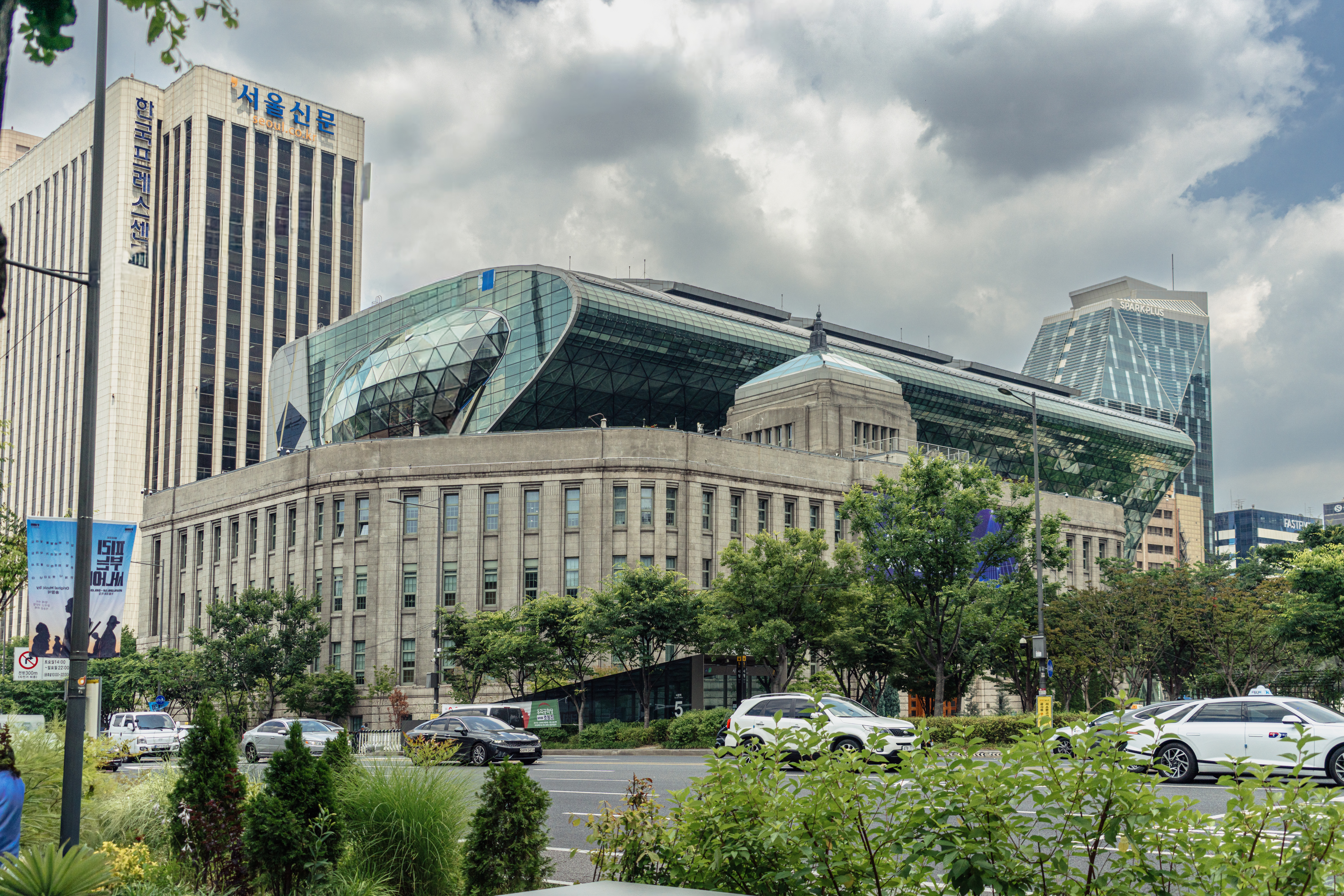
Seoul City office from the exit of the subway

== See also ==
- List of government agencies of South Korea
