= 2019 WCT Uiseong International Curling Cup =

World Curling Tour event

- Host city: Uiseong, South Korea
- Arena: Uiseong Curling Club
- Dates: September 29 – October 3
- Men's winner: (Canada) Team McEwen
- Curling club: West St. Paul CC, West St. Paul
- Skip: Mike McEwen
- Third: Reid Carruthers
- Second: Derek Samagalski
- Lead: Colin Hodgson
- Finalist: (United States) John Shuster
- Women's winner: (United States) Team Roth
- Curling club: St. Paul CC, Saint Paul
- Skip: Tabitha Peterson
- Third: Becca Hamilton
- Second: Tara Peterson
- Lead: Nina Roth
- Finalist: (South Korea) Kim Kyeong-ae

The 2019 WCT Uiseong International Curling Cup was held from September 29 to October 3 in Uiseong-eup, Uiseong County, South Korea. The total purse for the event was ₩ 55,000,000 on both the men's and women's sides. The event had a mix of teams from Canada, Italy, Norway, Russia, Switzerland, United States, and the host South Korea.

In the Men's event, Canada's Mike McEwen won their first event of the season by defeating Olympic gold medalist John Shuster from the United States 7–4 in the final. Canada's Scott McDonald won the bronze medal with a 10–4 victory over South Korea's Kim Soo-hyuk.

In the Women's event, USA's Nina Roth with Tabitha Peterson throwing skip rocks defeated Olympic silver medalists Kim Kyeong-ae who took over skipping duties for Kim Eun-jung 5–4 in an extra end. Switzerland's Silvana Tirinzoni took the bronze medal by defeating South Korea's Kim Min-ji 6–4.

== Men ==
=== Teams ===
The teams are listed as follows:

Skip	Third	Second	Lead	Locale
Matt Dunstone	Braeden Moskowy	Catlin Schneider	Dustin Kidby	Regina, Saskatchewan, Canada
Glenn Howard	Scott Howard	David Mathers	Tim March	Penetanguishene, Ontario, Canada
Kim Chang-min	Lee Ki-jeong	Kim Hak-gyun	Lee Ki-bok	Uiseong, South Korea
Kim Soo-hyuk	Lee Jeong-jae	Jeong Byeong-jin	Hwang Hyeon-jun	Seoul, South Korea
Scott McDonald	Jonathan Beuk	Wesley Forget	Scott Chadwick	Kingston, Ontario, Canada
Mike McEwen	Reid Carruthers	Derek Samagalski	Colin Hodgson	West St. Paul, Manitoba, Canada
Park Jong-duk	Nam Yoon-ho	Yoo Min-hyeon	Kim Jeong-min	Gangwon, South Korea
Joël Retornaz	Amos Mosaner	Sebastiano Arman	Simone Gonin	Pinerolo, Italy
John Shuster	Chris Plys	Matt Hamilton	John Landsteiner	(United States) Duluth, Minnesota
Thomas Ulsrud	Steffen Walstad	Markus Høiberg	Magnus Vågberg	Oppdal, Norway

=== Round-robin standings ===
Final round-robin standings

Key
Teams to Playoffs

Pool A	W	L
(Canada) Scott McDonald	3	1
(South Korea) Kim Soo-hyuk	2	2
(Canada) Matt Dunstone	2	2
(South Korea) Park Jong-duk	2	2
(Norway) Thomas Ulsrud	1	3

Pool B	W	L
(Canada) Mike McEwen	4	0
(United States) John Shuster	3	1
(Canada) Glenn Howard	2	2
(Italy) Joël Retornaz	1	3
(South Korea) Kim Chang-min	0	4

=== Round-robin results ===
All draw times are listed in Korean Standard Time (UTC+09:00).

==== Draw 1 ====
Sunday, September 29, 7:00 pm

Sheet A	1	2	3	4	5	6	7	8	Final
(Canada) Glenn Howard	0	1	0	0	0	2	0	0	3
(United States) John Shuster	0	0	2	2	0	0	0	1	5

Sheet B	1	2	3	4	5	6	7	8	9	Final
(Italy) Joël Retornaz	0	1	0	0	0	2	0	1	1	5
(South Korea) Kim Chang-min	0	0	0	1	1	0	2	0	0	4

Sheet C	1	2	3	4	5	6	7	8	Final
(Canada) Matt Dunstone	0	0	2	0	1	0	1	0	4
(Canada) Scott McDonald	1	0	0	2	0	1	0	1	5

Sheet D	1	2	3	4	5	6	7	8	Final
(South Korea) Kim Soo-hyuk	0	1	2	0	0	2	0	2	7
(South Korea) Park Jong-duk	2	0	0	1	1	0	2	0	6

==== Draw 3 ====
Monday, September 30, 3:00 pm

Sheet A	1	2	3	4	5	6	7	8	Final
(Canada) Scott McDonald	0	0	1	1	0	0	1	X	3
(South Korea) Park Jong-duk	0	1	0	0	0	0	0	X	1

Sheet B	1	2	3	4	5	6	7	8	Final
(Canada) Matt Dunstone	0	2	0	1	0	2	0	1	6
(Norway) Thomas Ulsrud	1	0	1	0	1	0	2	0	5

Sheet C	1	2	3	4	5	6	7	8	Final
(United States) John Shuster	1	0	0	1	2	0	2	2	8
(South Korea) Kim Chang-min	0	0	1	0	0	3	0	0	4

Sheet D	1	2	3	4	5	6	7	8	Final
(Canada) Glenn Howard	0	0	0	0	1	0	X	X	1
(Canada) Mike McEwen	0	1	2	2	0	3	X	X	8

==== Draw 5 ====
Tuesday, October 1, 7:00 am

Sheet A	1	2	3	4	5	6	7	8	Final
(Canada) Mike McEwen	1	0	1	0	1	0	3	0	6
(Italy) Joël Retornaz	0	1	0	1	0	2	0	1	5

Sheet B	1	2	3	4	5	6	7	8	Final
(Canada) Glenn Howard	3	0	1	0	0	0	3	X	7
(South Korea) Kim Chang-min	0	1	0	0	2	1	0	X	4

Sheet C	1	2	3	4	5	6	7	8	Final
(Norway) Thomas Ulsrud	1	0	2	0	0	0	0	0	3
(South Korea) Kim Soo-hyuk	0	1	0	1	1	2	0	1	6

Sheet D	1	2	3	4	5	6	7	8	9	Final
(Canada) Matt Dunstone	1	1	0	3	0	2	0	1	0	8
(South Korea) Park Jong-duk	0	0	3	0	2	0	3	0	1	9

==== Draw 7 ====
Tuesday, October 1, 3:00 pm

Sheet A	1	2	3	4	5	6	7	8	Final
(United States) John Shuster	0	1	0	0	1	0	0	X	2
(Canada) Mike McEwen	1	0	0	2	0	0	1	X	4

Sheet B	1	2	3	4	5	6	7	8	Final
(Canada) Matt Dunstone	3	3	0	0	3	0	X	X	9
(South Korea) Kim Soo-hyuk	0	0	1	1	0	2	X	X	4

Sheet C	1	2	3	4	5	6	7	8	Final
(Norway) Thomas Ulsrud	0	0	2	0	4	0	1	0	7
(Canada) Scott McDonald	1	0	0	1	0	2	0	1	5

Sheet D	1	2	3	4	5	6	7	8	9	Final
(Canada) Glenn Howard	3	0	1	0	2	0	0	1	1	8
(Italy) Joël Retornaz	0	2	0	2	0	2	1	0	0	7

==== Draw 9 ====
Wednesday, October 2, 7:00 am

Sheet D	1	2	3	4	5	6	7	8	Final
(Canada) Mike McEwen	2	0	3	0	1	3	X	X	9
(South Korea) Kim Chang-min	0	0	0	3	0	0	X	X	3

==== Draw 10 ====
Wednesday, October 2, 11:00 am

Sheet A	1	2	3	4	5	6	7	8	Final
(Norway) Thomas Ulsrud	0	0	1	0	X	X	X	X	1
(South Korea) Park Jong-duk	3	2	0	2	X	X	X	X	7

Sheet B	1	2	3	4	5	6	7	8	Final
(Canada) Scott McDonald	0	1	0	0	2	0	2	X	5
(South Korea) Kim Soo-hyuk	0	0	1	0	0	2	0	X	3

Sheet D	1	2	3	4	5	6	7	8	Final
(United States) John Shuster	0	0	2	0	0	0	4	X	6
(Italy) Joël Retornaz	0	0	0	0	1	0	0	X	1

=== Playoffs ===
Semifinals
B1	(Canada) Mike McEwen	10
A2	(South Korea) Kim Soo-hyuk	3
A1	(Canada) Scott McDonald	3
B2	(United States) John Shuster	7

Final
B1	(Canada) Mike McEwen	7
B2	(United States) John Shuster	4

Bronze medal game
A2	(South Korea) Kim Soo-hyuk	4
A1	(Canada) Scott McDonald	10

==== Semifinals ====
Wednesday, October 2, 7:00 pm

Sheet B	1	2	3	4	5	6	7	8	Final
(Canada) Mike McEwen	1	0	5	0	4	0	X	X	10
(South Korea) Kim Soo-hyuk	0	0	0	2	0	1	X	X	3

Sheet C	1	2	3	4	5	6	7	8	Final
(Canada) Scott McDonald	0	0	0	1	0	2	0	X	3
(United States) John Shuster	1	2	2	0	1	0	1	X	7

==== Bronze medal game ====
Thursday, October 3, 1:00 pm

Sheet B	1	2	3	4	5	6	7	8	Final
(South Korea) Kim Soo-hyuk	0	1	0	2	0	1	0	X	4
(Canada) Scott McDonald	2	0	3	0	2	0	3	X	10

==== Final ====
Thursday, October 3, 5:00 pm

Sheet B	1	2	3	4	5	6	7	8	Final
(Canada) Mike McEwen	2	0	0	2	0	1	2	X	7
(United States) John Shuster	0	1	0	0	3	0	0	X	4

== Women ==
=== Teams ===
The teams are listed as follows:

Skip	Third	Second	Lead	Locale
Theresa Cannon	Karen Klein	Vanessa Foster	Raunora Westcott	Winnipeg, Manitoba, Canada
Gim Un-chi	Um Min-ji	Kim Su-ji	Seol Ye-eun	Gyeonggido, South Korea
Kim Kyeong-ae (Note: As their skip Kim Eun-jung was still on maternity leave, third Kim Kyeong-ae took over as skip and alternate Kim Cho-hi stepped in as third.)	Kim Cho-hi	Kim Seon-yeong	Kim Yeong-mi	Uiseong, South Korea
Kim Min-ji	Ha Seung-youn	Kim Hye-rin	Kim Su-jin	Chuncheon, South Korea
Oh Eun-jin	Chung Jae-yi	Kim Ji-hyeon	Shin Ga-yeong	Jeonbuk, South Korea
Tabitha Peterson	Becca Hamilton	Tara Peterson	Nina Roth	(United States) Saint Paul, Minnesota
Anna Sidorova	Yulia Portunova	Olga Kotelnikova	Julia Guzieva	Moscow, Russia
Jamie Sinclair	Cory Christensen	Vicky Persinger	Taylor Anderson	(United States) Chaska, Minnesota
Briar Hürlimann (Fourth)	Elena Stern (Skip)	Lisa Gisler	Céline Koller	Brig-Glis, Switzerland
Alina Pätz (Fourth)	Silvana Tirinzoni (Skip)	Esther Neuenschwander	Melanie Barbezat	Aarau, Switzerland

=== Round-robin standings ===
Final round-robin standings

Key
Teams to Playoffs

Pool A	W	L
(Switzerland) Silvana Tirinzoni	4	0
(South Korea) Kim Min-ji	2	2
(United States) Jamie Sinclair	2	2
(South Korea) Gim Un-chi	1	3
(Russia) Anna Sidorova	1	3

Pool B	W	L
(South Korea) Kim Kyeong-ae	4	0
(United States) Team Roth	3	1
(Switzerland) Elena Stern	2	2
(Canada) Theresa Cannon	1	3
(South Korea) Oh Eun-jin	0	4

=== Round-robin results ===
All draw times are listed in Korean Standard Time (UTC+09:00).

==== Draw 2 ====
Monday, September 30, 11:00 am

Sheet A	1	2	3	4	5	6	7	8	Final
(Switzerland) Silvana Tirinzoni	0	0	1	1	1	0	2	0	5
(South Korea) Kim Min-ji	1	0	0	0	0	2	0	1	4

Sheet B	1	2	3	4	5	6	7	8	9	Final
(South Korea) Gim Un-chi	0	1	0	0	1	0	0	2	0	4
(United States) Jamie Sinclair	1	0	2	0	0	0	1	0	1	5

Sheet C	1	2	3	4	5	6	7	8	Final
(Switzerland) Elena Stern	0	1	0	0	0	2	2	1	6
(Canada) Theresa Cannon	0	0	0	2	1	0	0	0	3

Sheet D	1	2	3	4	5	6	7	8	Final
(South Korea) Kim Kyeong-ae	0	2	0	0	1	2	2	X	7
(South Korea) Oh Eun-jin	0	0	0	1	0	0	0	X	1

==== Draw 4 ====
Monday, September 30, 7:00 pm

Sheet A	1	2	3	4	5	6	7	8	Final
(Canada) Theresa Cannon	2	0	1	2	0	2	0	1	8
(South Korea) Oh Eun-jin	0	1	0	0	1	0	3	0	5

Sheet B	1	2	3	4	5	6	7	8	Final
(Switzerland) Elena Stern	0	0	2	0	2	0	0	1	5
(United States) Team Roth	3	1	0	1	0	1	1	0	7

Sheet C	1	2	3	4	5	6	7	8	Final
(South Korea) Kim Min-ji	2	0	1	0	2	0	3	X	8
(United States) Jamie Sinclair	0	2	0	1	0	1	0	X	4

Sheet D	1	2	3	4	5	6	7	8	9	Final
(Switzerland) Silvana Tirinzoni	0	1	0	3	0	0	2	0	1	7
(Russia) Anna Sidorova	2	0	1	0	1	1	0	1	0	6

==== Draw 6 ====
Tuesday, October 1, 11:00 am

Sheet A	1	2	3	4	5	6	7	8	Final
(Russia) Anna Sidorova	1	0	2	0	1	0	2	X	6
(South Korea) Gim Un-chi	0	1	0	1	0	2	0	X	4

Sheet B	1	2	3	4	5	6	7	8	Final
(Switzerland) Silvana Tirinzoni	0	3	0	0	0	3	0	2	8
(United States) Jamie Sinclair	2	0	1	1	0	0	1	0	5

Sheet C	1	2	3	4	5	6	7	8	Final
(United States) Team Roth	1	0	1	0	0	2	0	2	6
(South Korea) Kim Kyeong-ae	0	2	0	3	0	0	2	0	7

Sheet D	1	2	3	4	5	6	7	8	Final
(Switzerland) Elena Stern	3	2	1	0	0	0	1	0	7
(South Korea) Oh Eun-jin	0	0	0	2	1	1	0	1	5

==== Draw 8 ====
Tuesday, October 1, 7:00 pm

Sheet A	1	2	3	4	5	6	7	8	Final
(United States) Team Roth	3	3	0	1	0	2	X	X	9
(South Korea) Oh Eun-jin	0	0	2	0	1	0	X	X	3

Sheet B	1	2	3	4	5	6	7	8	Final
(Russia) Anna Sidorova	0	1	0	1	0	1	X	X	3
(United States) Jamie Sinclair	4	0	2	0	2	0	X	X	8

Sheet D	1	2	3	4	5	6	7	8	Final
(Canada) Theresa Cannon	0	0	0	1	0	1	X	X	2
(South Korea) Kim Kyeong-ae	2	2	1	0	2	0	X	X	7

==== Draw 9 ====
Wednesday, October 2, 7:00 am

Sheet A	1	2	3	4	5	6	7	8	Final
(South Korea) Gim Un-chi	1	0	1	1	0	1	0	4	8
(South Korea) Kim Min-ji	0	1	0	0	1	0	2	0	4

Sheet B	1	2	3	4	5	6	7	8	9	Final
(Canada) Theresa Cannon	2	0	0	2	0	1	0	1	0	6
(United States) Team Roth	0	0	1	0	3	0	2	0	1	7

==== Draw 11 ====
Wednesday, October 2, 3:00 pm

Sheet A	1	2	3	4	5	6	7	8	Final
(Switzerland) Silvana Tirinzoni	2	0	0	2	0	2	0	2	8
(South Korea) Gim Un-chi	0	2	1	0	1	0	2	0	6

Sheet B	1	2	3	4	5	6	7	8	Final
(South Korea) Kim Min-ji	1	0	2	0	0	1	0	1	5
(Russia) Anna Sidorova	0	2	0	0	0	0	2	0	4

Sheet D	1	2	3	4	5	6	7	8	Final
(Switzerland) Elena Stern	0	2	1	1	0	1	0	0	5
(South Korea) Kim Kyeong-ae	1	0	0	0	3	0	2	1	7

=== Playoffs ===
Semifinals
A1	(Switzerland) Silvana Tirinzoni	6
B2	(United States) Team Roth	7
B1	(South Korea) Kim Kyeong-ae	3
A2	(South Korea) Kim Min-ji	2

Final
B2	(United States) Team Roth	5
B1	(South Korea) Kim Kyeong-ae	4

Bronze medal game
A1	(Switzerland) Silvana Tirinzoni	6
A2	(South Korea) Kim Min-ji	4

==== Semifinals ====
Thursday, October 3, 9:00 am

Sheet B	1	2	3	4	5	6	7	8	Final
(Switzerland) Silvana Tirinzoni	1	1	0	3	0	0	0	1	6
(United States) Team Roth	0	0	2	0	2	2	1	0	7

Sheet C	1	2	3	4	5	6	7	8	Final
(South Korea) Kim Kyeong-ae	0	1	0	0	0	1	0	1	3
(South Korea) Kim Min-ji	0	0	1	0	0	0	1	0	2

==== Bronze medal game ====
Thursday, October 3, 1:00 pm

Sheet B	1	2	3	4	5	6	7	8	Final
(Switzerland) Silvana Tirinzoni	1	1	1	0	0	2	0	1	6
(South Korea) Kim Min-ji	0	0	0	1	1	0	2	0	4

==== Final ====
Thursday, October 3, 5:00 pm

Sheet B	1	2	3	4	5	6	7	8	9	Final
(United States) Team Roth	0	1	0	0	2	0	1	0	1	5
(South Korea) Kim Kyeong-ae	0	0	0	2	0	1	0	1	0	4
