= WCT Uiseong International Curling Cup =

World Curling Tour event

- Established: 2019
- Host city: Uiseong, South Korea
- Arena: Uiseong Curling Club
- Men's purse: ₩ 55,000,000 (2019)
- Women's purse: ₩ 55,000,000 (2019)

Current champions (2019)
- Men: (Manitoba) Mike McEwen
- Women: (United States) Team Roth

Current edition
- 2019 WCT Uiseong International Curling Cup

The WCT Uiseong International Curling Cup is an annual bonspiel, or curling tournament, held at the Uiseong Curling Club in Uiseong-eup, Uiseong County, South Korea. It has been a part of the Men's and Women's World Curling Tour since 2019. The tournament is held in a round robin format.

== Past champions ==
=== Men ===
Year	Winner	Runner up	Purse (₩)
2019	(Manitoba) Mike McEwen, Reid Carruthers, Derek Samagalski, Colin Hodgson	(United States) John Shuster, Chris Plys, Matt Hamilton, John Landsteiner	55,000,000
2020	Cancelled		

=== Women ===
Year	Winner	Runner up	Purse (₩)
2019	(United States) Tabitha Peterson, Becca Hamilton, Tara Peterson, Nina Roth	(South Korea) Kim Kyeong-ae, Kim Cho-hi, Kim Seon-yeong, Kim Yeong-mi	55,000,000
2020	Not held		
