= Geumseong (disambiguation) =

Geumseong (金城) was the capital of Silla, one of the Three Kingdoms of Korea.

Geumseong or Kŭmsŏng may also refer to:

- Geumseong City (錦城), the former name of Naju, a city in South Jeolla Province, South Korea
- Kumsong County (金城), a disestablished county of Gangwon, Korea
- Geumseong-myeon, Damyang County, a township of Damyang County, South Jeolla
- Geumseong-myeon, Geumsan County, a township of Geumsan County, South Chungcheong
- Geumseong-myeon, Hadong County, a township of Hadong County, South Gyeongsang
- Geumseong-myeon, Jecheon, a township of Jecheon, North Chungcheong
- Geumseong-myeon, Uiseong County, a township of Uiseong County, North Gyeongsang
- Kum-song, a Korean given name
