= 2025 South Korea wildfires =

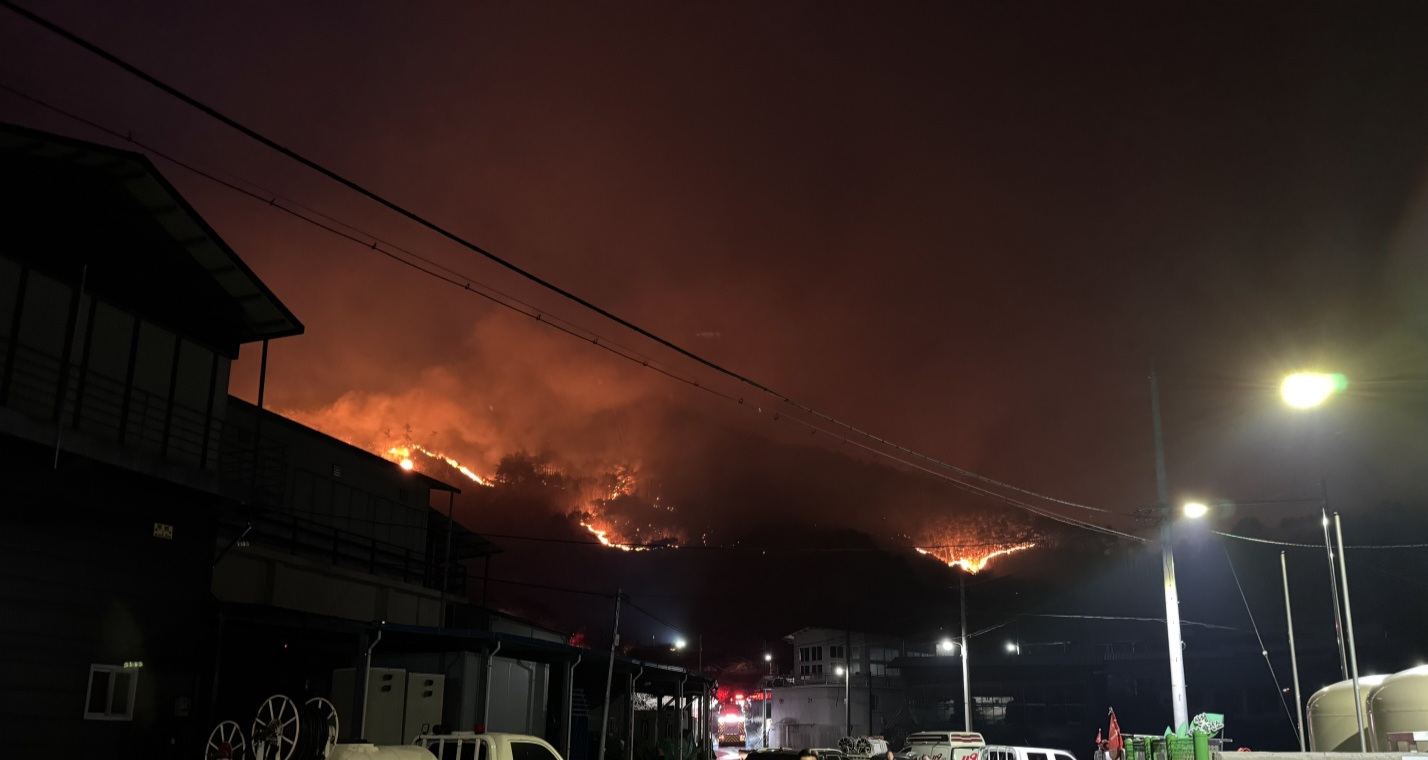
- A forest fire in Sancheong County, South Gyeongsang Province
- Date: March 21, 2025 – May 15, 2025
- Location: Central and southern South Korea

Statistics
- Status: Extinguished
- Total fires: 347
- Burned area: about 104,788 hectares (258,940 acres)

Impacts
- Deaths: 32
- Injuries: 54
- Evacuated: >37,829

From March 21 until May 15, 2025, South Korea experienced a severe wildfire outbreak involving more than 20 separate blazes occurring simultaneously across the country. The disaster killed 32 people, including three firefighters and one government employee, and has led to the displacement of more than 37,000 people. The first significant fire occurred in Sancheong County, followed by the most significant fire in Uiseong County, prompting widespread evacuations and mobilizing extensive firefighting resources. In response to the emergency, several provinces were officially designated as disaster zones by the national government.

The wildfires have been deemed the worst in South Korea's history by acting president Han Duck-soo.

== Wildfires ==
The Sancheong County fire began on March 21, 2025, and by the evening of March 22 had consumed approximately 1,200 acres (490 ha) of land. The mountainous topography combined with strong winds and dry conditions significantly hampered containment efforts, with firefighters achieving only 35% containment despite substantial deployment of resources for combating the wildfire after earlier reaching 70% containment. Fires in North Gyeongsang Province burned approximately 740 acres (300 ha), while Gimhae experienced additional significant fires requiring evacuations. A wildfire broke out in Ulsan, Ulju County.

Additional wildfire incidents were reported across central Chungcheong Province and southwestern Jeolla Province, indicating the nationwide scope of the emergency.

Additional wildfires that broke out simultaneously have affected multiple regions throughout central and southern South Korea. The Korea Forest Service issued its highest-level "severe" fire warnings for 12 locations, including Daejeon, Busan, and the North and South Gyeongsang Provinces. The alert was later issued for the whole country.

=== March 23 ===
At 4:03 pm, a fire broke out on Mokdo Island, Ulju-gun, Ulsan, and was extinguished after 1 hour and 50 minutes.

=== March 24 ===
At 3 pm on March 24, the Seosan–Yeongdeok Expressway Jeomgok Rest Stop for the Yeongdeok direction was damaged by a forest fire. The forest fire then spread to the mountains of Hyeonha-ri, Gilan-myeon, Andong, and Gyeongsangbuk-do. Prime Minister Han Duck-soo visited the Forest Fire Integrated Command Center and inspected the forest fire response situation.

=== March 25 ===
On March 25, the National Fire Agency raised its fire response level to the highest of three alert levels. That same day, the Gounsa temple in Uiseong, which dates back from the Silla period, was destroyed by the wildfires, which occurred after the National Treasures in its collection had been evacuated. At least 92 private and public facilities in the county were also damaged by the fire. Eleven firefighters who assisted in the evacuation of items and monks and other personnel at the complex were rescued after being trapped in a bathhouse for several hours when the fires arrived. The Korea Heritage Service issued a 'serious' national heritage disaster national crisis alert nationwide.

By that same day, more than 15,000 hectares (37,000 acres) of land had been burned in the wildfires.

=== March 26 ===
In Yeongdeok County, 104 residents became stranded at a coastal port and breakwater while attempting to flee the advancing fire during the early morning hours of March 26. These individuals required subsequent rescue operations by the Uljin Coast Guard. Media outlets ascribed blame for the situation to the failure of Korean emergency response services to coordinate the regional evacuation process.

Two of three buildings of the Cheorwon Mushroom Farm burnt down in Seo-myeon, Cheorwon County, Gangwon Province.

At noon, an S-76 firefighting helicopter crashed while responding to fires in Uiseong, killing the pilot. The helicopter was later found to have a 30-year airframe age.

On the same day, tap water supply in certain high-altitude areas of Andong were cut off due to a power outage at the pressurized water supply facility caused by the wildfire. The areas included the myeons of Imha, Namhu, Iljik, Namseon, Imdong, Pungcheon, and Gilan.

=== March 27 ===
North Gyeongsang Province experienced intermittent rain, though its extinguishing power was minimal. The province also experienced exceptionally poor air quality, with PM_{2.5} particulate reaching the concentration of 557μg/m^{3} in Andong, seven times the "extremely poor" designation. By 5 pm, the fire spread to two kilometers outside of Andong limits. The fire department reported containment of the spread, though it remained cautious about high winds reigniting the flames.

=== March 28 ===
Authorities announced the full containment of wildfires in North Gyeongsang.

=== March 29 ===
Wildfires reignited in the Andong area early in the morning.

=== March 30 ===
Authorities announced the full containment of wildfires in North and South Gyeongsang.

=== April 6 ===
A second helicopter crashed while fighting the fires in northwestern Daegu, killing its pilot.

=== April 7 ===
At noon, a wildfire broke out on a mountain in Hadong County, injuring one person who is suspected by authorities of starting the fire while using a turf cutter. At least 65 hectares (160 acres) of land were affected, while at least 506 people were evacuated.

=== April 10 ===
In the afternoon, a wildfire broke out in the eastern part of the Korean Demilitarized Zone in Goseong County, Gangwon.

=== April 26 ===
In the afternoon, a wildfire broke out in a mountainous area near Inje County, Gangwon.

=== April 28 ===
In the afternoon, a wildfire broke out at the mountain Hamjisan in Daegu, affecting at least 57 hectares and prompting the National Fire Agency to order the mobilization of all available national personnel and equipment. The Korea Forest Service also issued its highest wildfire response Level 3.

=== April 29 ===
The Hamjisan fire was declared contained.

=== April 30 ===
The Hamjisan fire reignited in the afternoon, prompting evacuations again.

=== May 1 ===
The main section of the Hamjisan fire was declared contained again.

=== June 1 ===
A wildfire broke out on Suraksan in Nowon District in Seoul and was contained that same evening.

== Casualties and damage ==
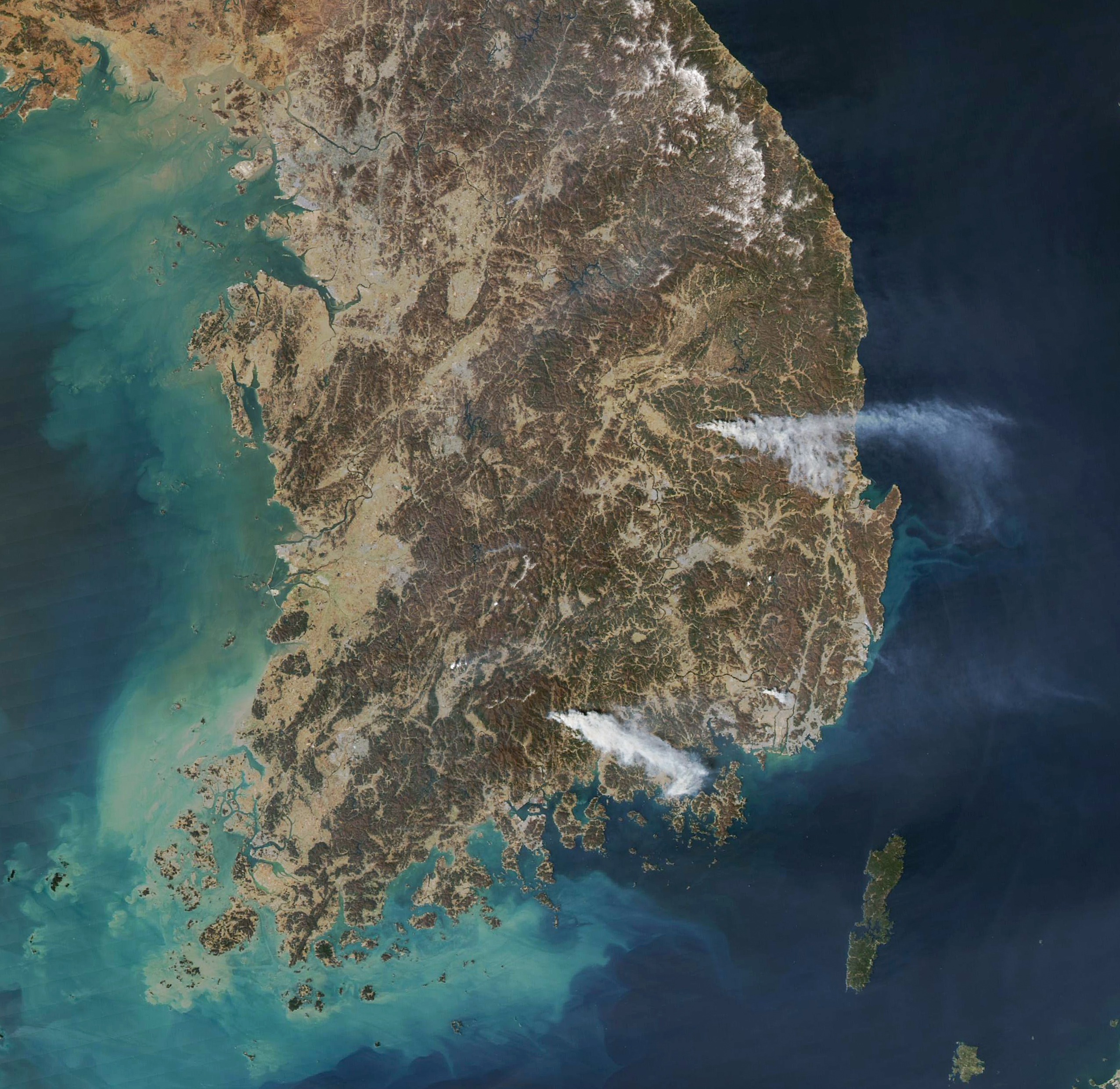
Satellite photo, 22 March

At least 32 people were confirmed to have died in the wildfires, while 51 others were injured, nine of them seriously. It is the deadliest wildfire outbreak in South Korea since records began in 1987. Twenty of the dead originated from Uiseong, while four were from Sancheong. Most of the dead were aged in sixties to seventies. The confirmed fatalities included three firefighting personnel and one public sector worker who perished while combating the Sancheong County fire. Five other emergency personnel sustained injuries during firefighting operations and required medical treatment. One civilian was injured.

Two civilians were found dead while evacuating from the Uiseong fire in Cheongsong and Andong, respectively. Three civilians in Yeongdeok and five in Yeongyang were also found dead. The chief of the village of Samui-ri was killed along with his wife and two relatives died after their car was caught up in the fires. One person also went missing in Cheongsong. On March 26, a firefighting helicopter crashed in Uiseong, killing the pilot. Another firefighting helicopter crashed on April 6 in Daegu, killing the pilot.

Around 4,015 houses, 1,914 agricultural and livestock facilities, seven temples and 986 other structures were damaged by the wildfires, while authorities estimated total damages to have reached approximately 2 trillion won ($1.35 billion). On March 25, Gounsa Temple, one of the headquarters of the Jogye Order, was severely damaged by the fire. Several structures, including Gaunru and Yeonsujeon, both Treasures, were burnt down. Only nine of the complex's 30 buildings were unaffected by the fire. The Korea Heritage Service also confirmed damage to 30 heritage sites. Among them were the Chiljoknyeong Pass on Baegunsan in Gangwon Province; a 900-year-old ginkgo tree and the Goryeo-era Dubangjae Shrine in Hadong, South Gyeongsang; an evergreen forest and a centuries-old fortress in Ulsan; the Joseon-era Mansae Pavilion, the late 18th-century Sanam House in Cheongsong, and the stone seated Buddha statue at Manjang Temple in Uiseong. The Beopseongsa Temple in Seokbo-myeon in Yeongyang, North Gyeongsang, was also destroyed, killing its presiding monk. The Yakgye Pavilion in Andong and the Gigokjesa ritual house in Cheongsong were also destroyed.

A report by the National Institute of Forest Science in March 2025 said that structural recovery of ecosystems affected by the wildfires could take more than 30 years, while their full ecological stabilization would take more than 100 years. An assessment by the government in April 2025 found that wildfires in North Gyeongsang alone had damaged about 90,289 hectares (223,110 acres), while 3,397 hectares (8,390 acres) were affected in South Gyeongsang Province and 1,190 hectares (2,900 acres) in Ulsan.

== Investigation ==
The Uiseong wildfire was attributed by Acting President Han Duck-soo to an accident caused by a person who was tending to a family grave site and used a lighter to remove a tree branch hanging over the site, triggering embers that were spread by winds. The suspect was formally charged by police on 30 March.

The Sancheong-Hadong fire was found to have been caused by a brush cutter at a farm, while a fire in Ulju was blamed on a welding operation at a farm. The Gimhae fire was caused by a graveyard keeper who burned a bag of chips, while a wildfire in Hamyang was found to have been started by sparks from a fence being welded as protection from wildlife.

On April 11, police in Wonju arrested a woman on suspicion of starting five fires near the mountain Chiaksan between March 26 and April 6.

== Response ==
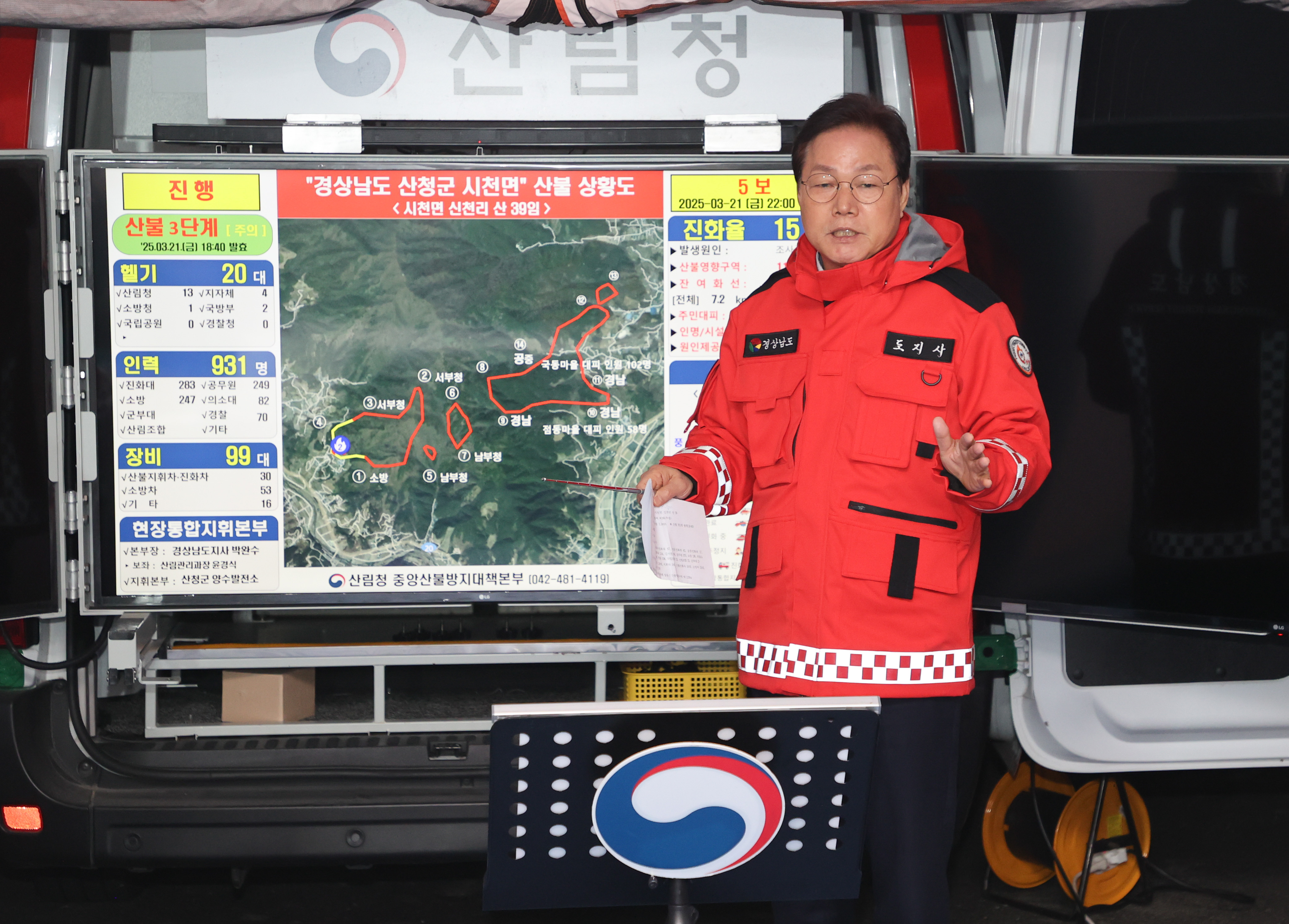
South Gyeongsang Province Governor Park Wan-su at the Sancheong Wildfires Response Meeting, 21 March

The firefighting operation has involved nearly 1,600 personnel, 35 helicopters, and numerous ground vehicles. Acting President of South Korea Choi Sang-mok directed all relevant government agencies to employ the maximum available resources for fire suppression activities. The national administration formally declared North and South Gyeongsang provinces and Ulsan as disaster zones, enabling additional emergency resources and support measures. The government said that it would issue a special disaster and safety grant amounting to 2.6 billion won (US$177.4 million) for the affected areas, and pledged 50 million won in disaster relief funds for affected residents of Sancheong County.

The South Korean government mobilized more than 25% of affiliated government officials and deployed over 50% of local public service personnel to standby positions in areas placed under "severe" fire conditions. Military shooting exercises in the warning regions were suspended, and forest entry permits were canceled. Areas designated with "alert" fire warnings had more than one-sixth of affiliated government officials mobilized, with over one-third of local public service personnel being mobilized to standby positions. The Republic of Korea Armed Forces deployed 6,000 personnel and 242 helicopters to help in firefighting efforts.

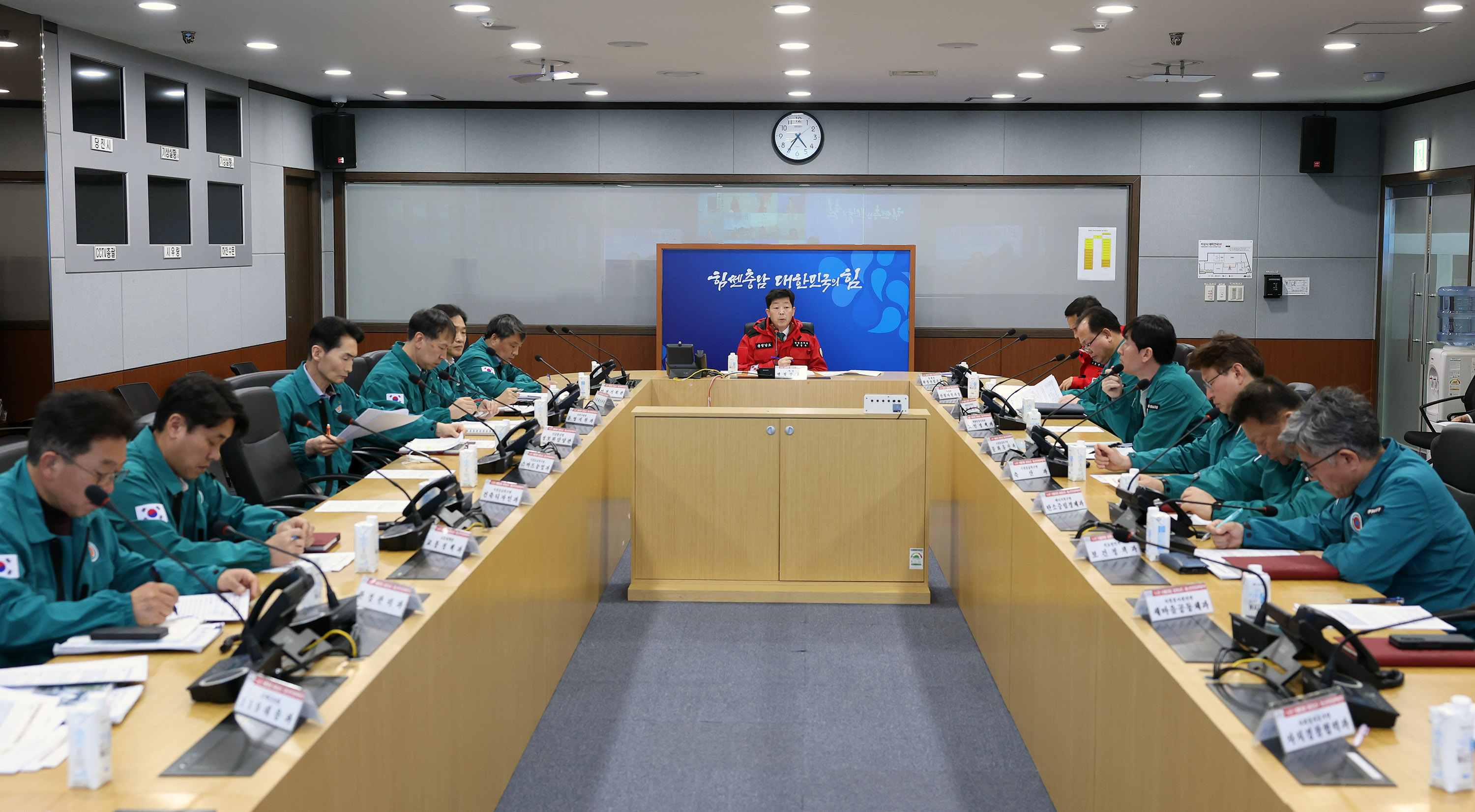
South Chungcheong Province Wildfires Emergency Meeting, 25 March

The emergency displaced at least 37,829 people and necessitated the evacuation of residents from 15 villages in affected areas. This included the evacuation of 260 residents of Sancheong County to temporary shelters after their homes were destroyed by wildfires from the surrounding hillsides, the displacement of 500 individuals in Uiseong County, and dozens of residents of Gimhae. A wildfire that spread in Ulju County in Ulsan, necessitated the evacuation of about 80 people. Additionally, authorities closed multiple highway and railway sections in southeastern regions, including a major route connecting Ulsan and Busan, the nation's second-largest metropolitan area. Authorities also ordered the evacuation of 2,600 inmates at the Cheongsong Prison after wildfires reached Cheongsong County from Uiseong, while 800 inmates were also evacuated from Andong Prison. The evacuations were the first large-scale operations of its kind conducted by the Ministry of Justice due to a natural disaster.

Amid threats to cultural heritage in the area, the Korea Heritage Service raised its disaster alert level to "serious" for the first time on March 25, the highest in its four-tier warning system. The agency also said it had relocated 15 historic items, including 10 national treasures, from affected areas, including pieces from Bongjeongsa in Andong, Buseoksa in Yeongju, and Gounsa in Uiseong. It also confirmed eight cases of damage to cultural sites, including at Gounsa, where all but nine of the complex's 30 buildings were destroyed. Among them were the Yeongsu Hall and Gaunru Pavilion, both of which are designated national treasures. Evacuation orders were issued to residents of Byeongsan Seowon and the Hahoe Folk Village, which are UNESCO World Heritage Sites, as well as the Daejeon Temple in Cheongsong. A large fire cannon was deployed to Hahoe to protect the village, along with 14 firefighting vehicles and 98 personnel.

Impeached president Yoon Suk Yeol expressed condolences over the wildfires. Following his reinstatement as acting president, Han Duck-soo sent handwritten letters to relatives of those killed in the wildfires and said he would meet with other wildfire victims on March 24. He also ordered local governments to "mobilize all available administrative resources to ensure residents in the affected areas can quickly move to safe locations", and announced a crackdown on illegal incineration as well as a review on government regulations on wildfire prevention and response. On March 27, Han sent acting interior minister Ko Ki-dong to oversee relief efforts in North Gyeongsang. On March 28, Han visited Andong and met with disaster officials and victims of the wildfires.

Hyundai Motor Group, SK Group and LG Group donated KRW2 billion (US$1.26 million) each to assist in recovery efforts, while Lotte Group donated KRW1 billion and Shinsegae Group gave KRW500 million. They also sent additional services and equipment, including eight vehicles and other appliances and necessities. SPC Group and Oriental Brewery delivered bottled water to affected areas.

Multiple K-pop figures sent donations to wildfire relief, including boy group Seventeen, who donated 1 billion won to the Hope Bridge National Disaster Relief Association, Ulju native Lee Chan-won, who gave 100 million won (US$68,000) to the Korea Disaster Relief Association, singer Jung Kook, who donated 1 billion won to the Hope Bridge National Disaster Relief Association, girl group Le Sserafim, who donated 50 million won to the Hope Bridge National Disaster Relief Association, actress and singer Im Yoon-ah, who donated 100 million won to the Community Chest of Korea, and singer Taeyeon, who donated 100 million won to the Korean Red Cross. The entertainment company Hybe also donated 1 billion won ($682,000) to the Korea Heritage Service and the National Trust for Cultural Heritage to fund the restoration of cultural heritage damaged by the wildfires. By March 28, the Korea Disaster Relief Association said it had raised 1.83 billion won in fundraising to buy firefighting equipment. As of April 7, a total of 112.4 billion won (US$75 million) has been raised in multiple relief efforts for the disaster.

On April 6, the South Korean government said it would issue long-term residency visas to three Indonesian nationals, including a sailor, who helped evacuate elderly residents during the wildfires in Uiseong.

=== Criticism ===
The Korean disaster response has become the subject of significant criticism from media outlets, who have stated that the uncoordinated and "immature" responses have contributed to the number of deaths and casualties caused by the wildfires.

Emergency disaster text message alerts were described as unsystematic and confusing. Evacuation notices were frequently issued just before the fire crossed into new jurisdictions, allowing minimal preparation time for residents to flee. In some instances, evacuation instructions were contradictory, with designated evacuation locations changing within minutes of the initial directions. In addition, the evacuation messages lacked practical means to self-evacuate, and inadequately addressed the complex needs of vulnerable populations, particularly elderly residents of which several were among the fatalities. Yonhap News described the use of a general evacuation order only once the fire was imminent, instead of sequenced evacuations in advance once the fires started days earlier, as creating situations akin to "a battlefield with a line of refugees".

The stranding of 104 residents in Yeongdeok County at a coastal port and breakwater while attempting to flee the advancing fire during early morning hours was regarded as a consequence of improper coordination concerning the evacuation process. Critics noted that despite the fire's demonstrated ability to spread rapidly between jurisdictions, authorities appeared reluctant to order preemptive evacuations in areas that were clearly at risk based on fire progression and weather conditions.

Representatives from the emergency management authorities have acknowledged shortcomings in their disaster response while emphasizing the challenges presented by the wildfire conditions. An official statement ascribed the failures to the unprecedented difficulty of coordinating evacuations amid hurricane-force winds that rapidly changed direction, combined with near-zero visibility conditions. The authorities indicated that while most residents were successfully evacuated, they acknowledged responsibility for those who perished during evacuation attempts. Officials have cited the dynamic nature of the wildfire situation as a factor in the changing evacuation directives, explaining that designated safe zones had to be adjusted as the fire's behavior evolved.

The mayor of Ulsan, Kim Du-gyeom, was criticized for saying in a disaster briefing that it was difficult to deploy personnel for wildfire suppression because "there are many female employees".

== List of major wildfires ==
Name	County	Area	Start date	Containment date (Note: Containment means that fire crews have established and secured control lines around the fire's perimeter. These lines are artificial barriers, like trenches or cleared vegetation, designed to stop the fire's spread, or natural barriers like rivers. Containment reflects progress in managing the fire but does not necessarily mean the fire is starved of fuel, under control, or put out.)	Casualties and Damages	Notes	Ref.
Sancheong-Hadong	Sancheong, Hadong	1,858 hectares (4,590 acres)	March 21	March 30	4 dead, 10 injured	Major fire in Sancheong and Hadong. Fire reached Jirisan National Park and Jinju	
Uiseong-Andong	Uiseong, Andong, Cheongsong, Yeongdeok, Yeongyang	99,289 hectares (245,350 acres)	March 22	March 30	26 dead, 33 injured. Thousands of structures destroyed, including Gounsa	Evacuations in Uiseong, Andong, Cheongsong, Yeongdeok, Yeongyang, Uljin, Yecheon and Pohang. Fire reached Juwangsan National Park, and spread east to Yeongyang and Yeongdeok. It was initially contained on March 27, but several reignitions have occurred since.	
Ulju-Onyang	Ulju, Yangsan	931 hectares (2,300 acres)	March 22	March 27	2 injured	Hundreds evacuated. Fire reignited and spread to Yangsan	
Gimhae	Gimhae	97 hectares (240 acres)	March 22	March 25		Hundreds evacuated	
Okcheon-Yeongdong	Okcheon, Yeongdong	39 hectares (96 acres)	March 23	March 25	1 injured	Reignitions had hindered the complete extinguishment	
Gochang-Jeongeup	Gochang	6.3 hectares (15.568 acres)	March 25	March 25		Fire reached Jeongeup	
Ulju-Eonyang	Ulju	63 hectares (160 acres)	March 25	March 26			
Bonghwa	Bonghwa	9.5 hectares (23 acres)	March 25	March 26		Bushfire caused by Uiseong-Andong fire	
Dalseong	Dalseong	8 hectares (19.768 acres)	March 26	March 27			
Muju	Muju	93 hectares (229.808 acres)	March 26	March 27		Caused by short circuit in the warehouse	
Daegu	Buk District		April 6	April 6	1 dead	Fire helicopter crash killed pilot	
Hadong	Hadong	66 hectares (163.09 acres)	April 7	April 8	1 injured	500 evacuated	
Inje	Inje	69 hectares (170 acres)	April 26	April 27			
Daegu	Buk District	310 hectares (770 acres)	April 28	May 1		6,500 evacuated. It was initially contained on April 29 but reignited on the next day.	

== See also ==
- 2022 Uljin forest fire
- Environment of South Korea
- Wildfires in 2025
- 2025 United States wildfires
- 2025 Canadian wildfires
