= 2022 Uljin forest fire =

Korean wildfire 2022

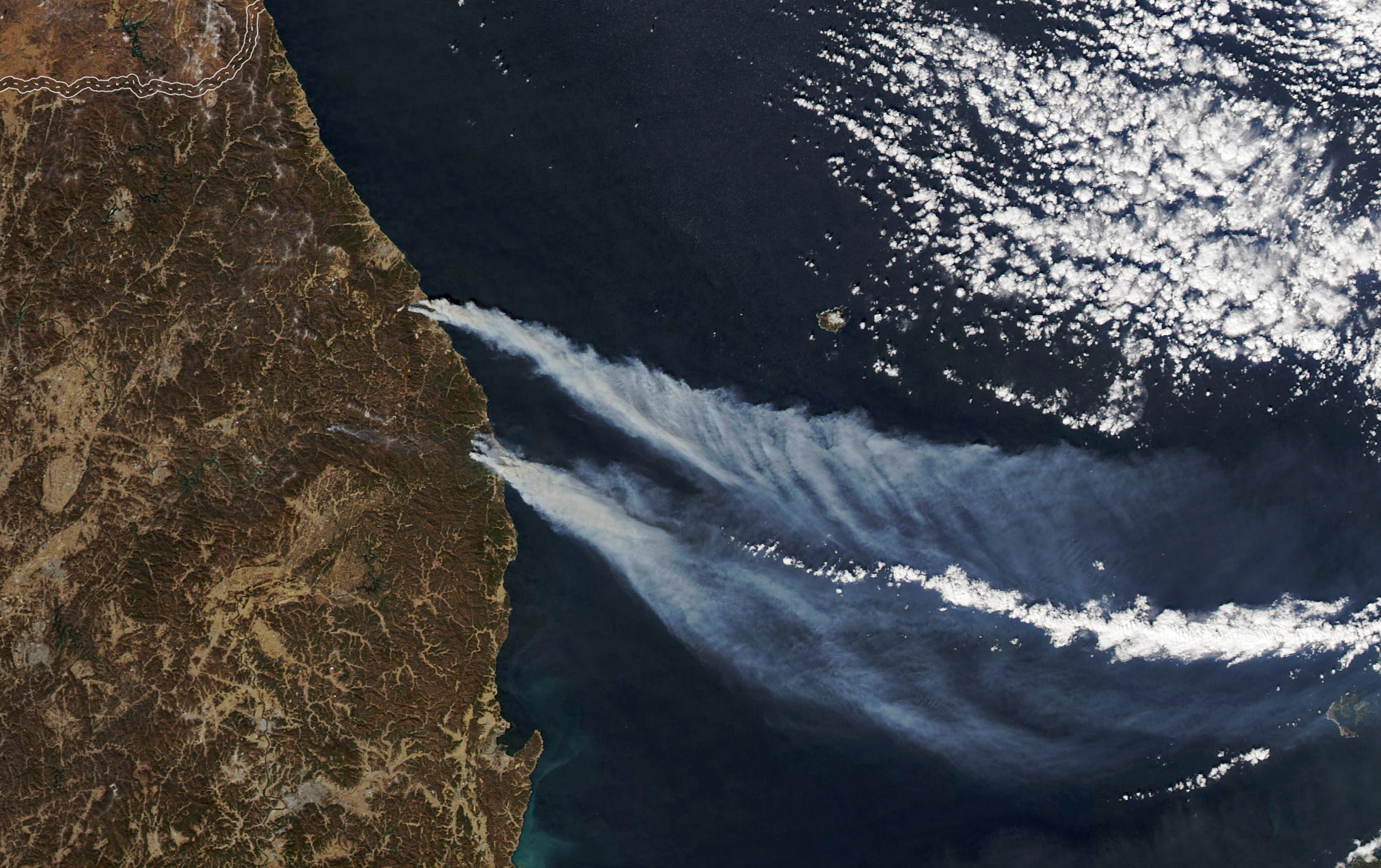
- Fires in Uljin 2022 (NASA image, 7 March 2022)
- Date: 3 March 2022 – 15 April 2022

Impacts
- Evacuated: 3995

On 3 March 2022 a major forest fire started in Uljin, South Korea, which threatened a liquified natural gas plant and the Hanul Nuclear Power Plant. It burned over 20,923 hectares of land, and by the end of its first day 3,995 people been evacuated. It was finally extinguished on 15 April 2022, and required Korean Army and US. Army support. Extinguishing the blaze required 84 helicopters, 3,970 Korean firefighting service personnel, 1,600 servicemen from the South Korean military, and personnel and helicopters from the US Army.

== See also ==
- March 2025 South Korea wildfires
