= Gounsa =

Buddhist temple in South Korea

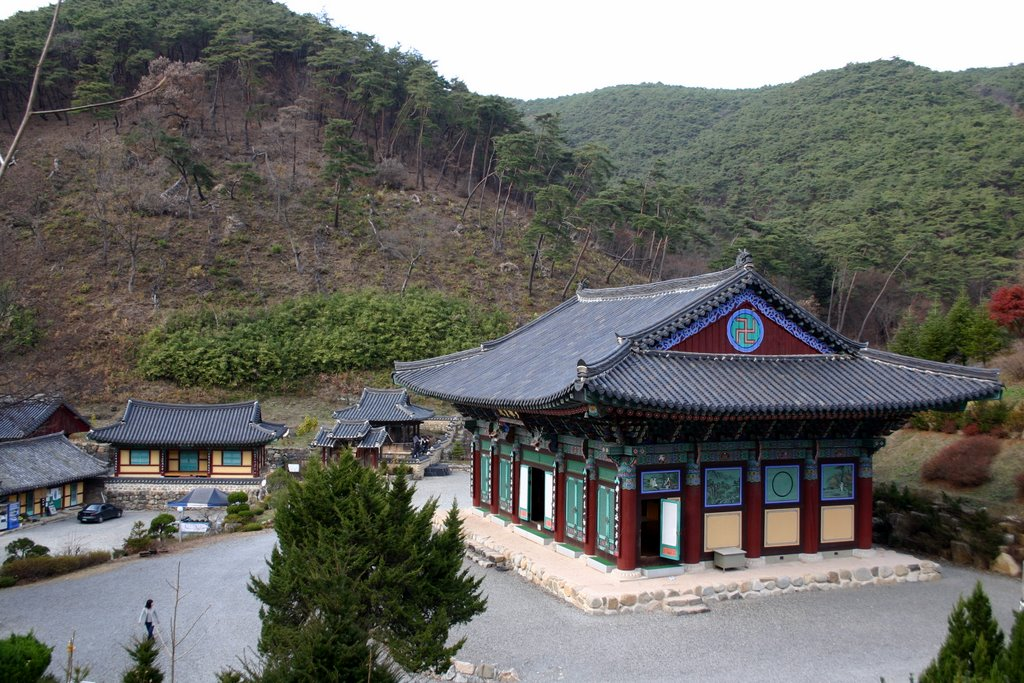

Korean name
- Hangul: 고운사
- Hanja: 孤雲寺
- RR: Gounsa
- MR: Kounsa

Gounsa is a head temple of the Jogye Order of Korean Buddhism. It is located in Danchon-myeon, Uiseong County, in the province of North Gyeongsang, South Korea.

== History ==
The temple was built in 681 C.E. by Uisang, a leading Buddhist monk of Silla. The name means "lonely cloud"; these characters were chosen after the temple was visited by scholar Ch'oe Ch'i-wŏn. The temple had previously been known by the same name, but with the meaning of "high cloud." Ch'oe later designed the temple's Gaunru and Uhwa-ru pavilions. The complex was significantly expanded by Doseon-guksa during the reign of King Heongang of Silla, and included 366 buildings and over 200 monks. It was also during this time that the temple's resident Stone Seated Buddha, which was subsequently designated as a national treasure, was produced. During the Goryeo Dynasty, the temple was reconstructed in 948 and 1018.

Gounsa served as a center of uibyeong resistance during the Imjin War, when it was one of few temples to escape being burned by the Japanese forces. After the war, the temple underwent reconstruction in 1695, but burned down in 1803 and 1835; thus, all current buildings dated from the 19th or 20th century. During the Japanese occupation of Korea, the temple was designated in 1912 as one of 30 principal temples in Korea, with jurisdiction over 46 branch temples. The temple served as a center of activity for Buddhist monks during the March First Movement in 1919.

Following Korean independence in 1945, the temple grounds were significantly reduced due to land reform policies that saw its agricultural lands redistributed to farmers. In 1969, Gounsa was designated as the head temple of the 16th District of the Jogye-jong Order of Korean Buddhism, with jurisdiction over 60 temples. In 1975, the temple was again devastated by fire and underwent major restoration works in 1992. In 2025, the complex hosted 40 monks.

The temple was severely damaged during the 2025 South Korea wildfires, which occurred hours after the movable national treasures in its collection had been evacuated on 25 March. Twenty-one of the complex's 30 buildings were destroyed, including nearly all its wooden structures, the Choe Chi-won Literary Museum, Yeongsu Hall and Gaunru Pavilion, the last two of which are designated national treasures. Eleven firefighters who assisted in the evacuation of items and monks and other personnel at the complex were rescued after being trapped in a bathhouse near Daeungjeon Hall for several hours when the fires arrived.

== Religious significance ==
The temple is regarded as the most sacred site for the worship of Jijang-bosal (Kṣitigarbha) in Korea, with tradition saying that the deceased are asked in the afterlife by Yama, the leader of the Ten Kings of the Underworld (Siwang), whether they have been to the Gounsa when they were still alive. This has led to the temple's alternative name, the Haedong Jijang-bosal sanctuary

== See also ==
- Korean Buddhist temples
- Religion in South Korea
