= Kum-song =

- Hangul: 금성
- RR: Geumseong
- MR: Kŭmsŏng

Kum-song, also spelled Geum-seong, is a Korean given name.

People with this name include:

- Chang Kum-song (1977–2006), niece of North Korean leader Kim Jong-il
- Ri Kum-song (born 1980), North Korean male marathon runner
- Hwang Kum-song, North Korean swimmer, participant in Synchronized swimming at the 2006 Asian Games – Women's team
- Seok Geum-seong, South Korean actress, recipient of the 1983 Special Achievement Award in the Korean Association of Film Critics Awards

== See also ==
- Geumseong (disambiguation)
