= Geumseong-myeon, Uiseong County =

Township in South Korea

Coordinates: 36.2611°N 128.6794°E

- Hangul: 금성면
- Hanja: 金城面
- RR: Geumseong-myeon
- MR: Kŭmsŏng-myŏn

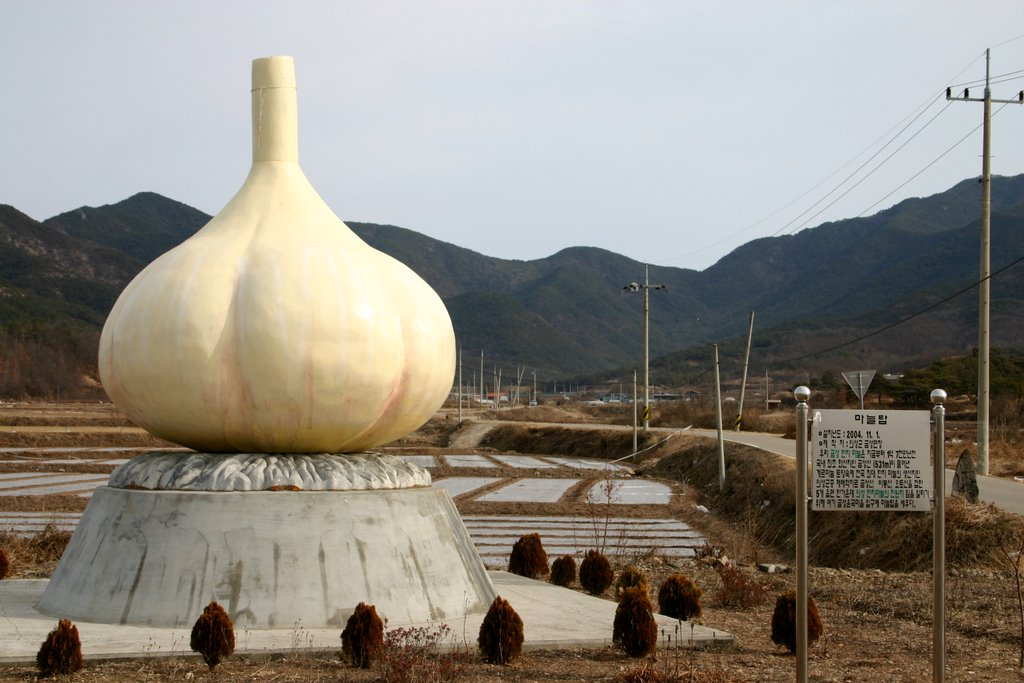
The Garlic Tower in Geumseong-myeon.

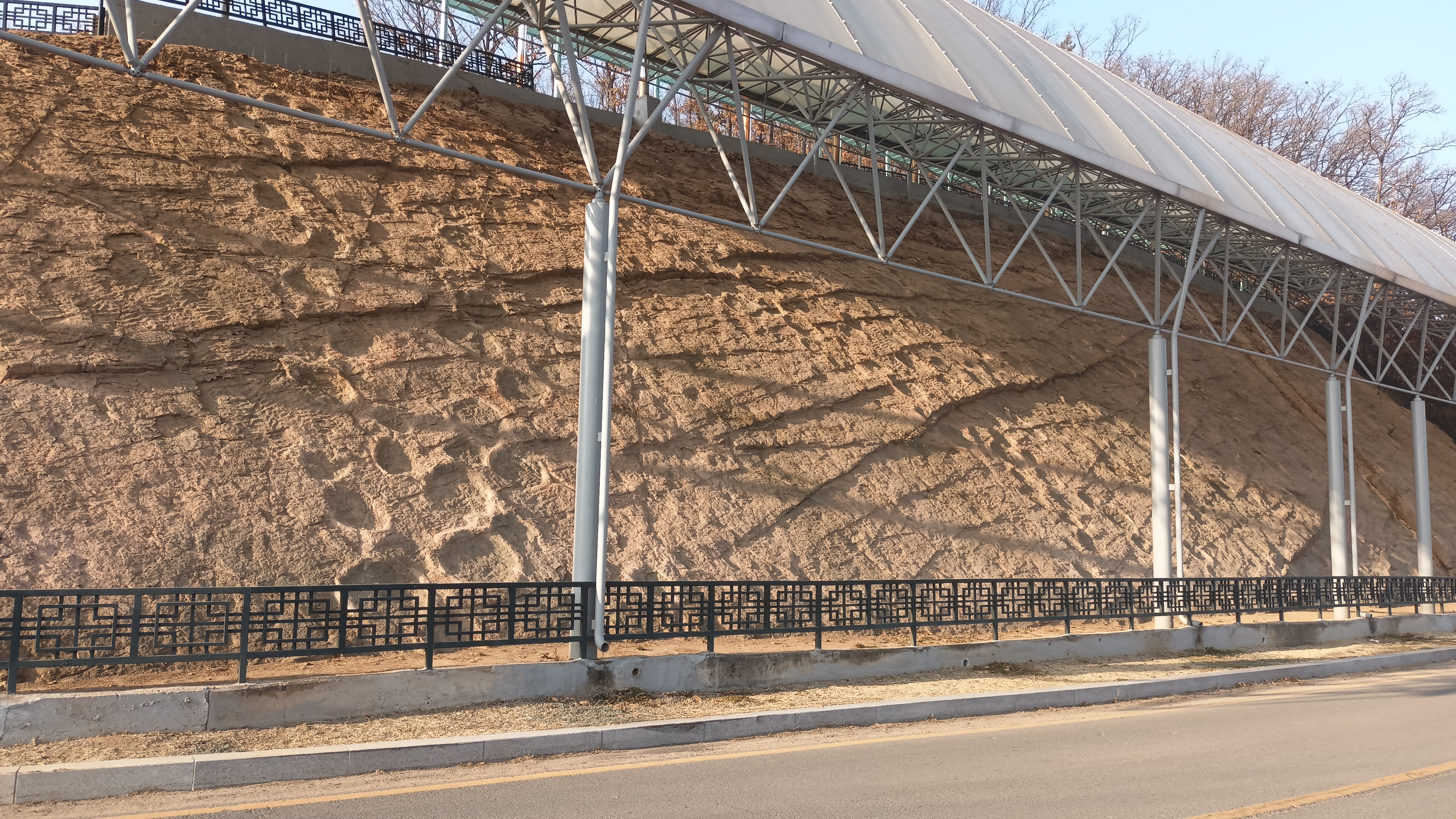
Dinosaur footprints in Jeo-ri, Geumseong-myeon.

Geumseong-myeon (Korean: 금성면) is a myeon or township in Uiseong, South Korea. It has an area of 75 square kilometres (29 mi^{2}). It is known for Uiseong garlic and the Tap-ri (Tower Village) dinosaur fossils.

The township was established in 1934 and takes its name from the mountain Geumseongsan, which overlooks the township. In 1973, the village of Gwanghyeon-ri (then Gwanghyeon-dong) was transferred to Gunwi-eup in Gunwi County by presidential decree, giving the township its present configuration.

The township's area is divided into 15 legal ri, which are in turn divided into 39 administrative ri. As of 2022, Maejeon-myeon had a registered population of 4,236 residents in 2,491 households. Of these residents, 4,201 (99.2%) were Korean. As of 2019, the average age of residents in Geumseong-myeon was 58.8.

National Route 28 and the Jungang line railroad run through the township from north to south.
