= Uiseong-eup =

Uiseong
- Town
- Panoramic view of Uiseong-eup
- Interactive map of Uiseong
- Coordinates: 36°20′54″N 128°42′15″E
- Country: South Korea
- Province: North Gyeongsang
- County: Uiseong County
- Administrative divisions: 13 beopjeongni, 31 hangjeongni and 213 ban

Area
  - Total: 68.80 km^{2} (26.56 sq mi)

Population (2014.6)
  - Total: 14,409
  - Density: 209.4/km^{2} (542.4/sq mi)
- Website: Uiseong Town

Korean name
- Hangul: 의성읍
- Hanja: 義城邑
- RR: Uiseong-eup
- MR: Ŭisŏng-ŭp

Uiseong-eup (Korean: 의성읍) is a town, or eup in Uiseong County, North Gyeongsang Province, South Korea. The township Uiseong-myeon was upgraded to the town Uiseong-eup in 1940. Uiseong County Office and Uiseong Town Office are located in Hujuk-ri.

== Communities ==
Uiseong-eup is divided into 13 villages (ri).

	Hangul	Hanja
Hujuk-ri	후죽리	帿竹里
Jungni-ri	중리리	中里里
Sangni-ri	상리리	上里里
Dodong-ri	도동리	道東里
Doseo-ri	도서리	道西里
Chiseon-ri	치선리	致仙里
Oro-ri	오로리	五老里
Bibong-ri	비봉리	飛鳳里
Palseong-ri	팔성리	八城里
Yongyeon-ri	용연리	龍淵里
Wondang-ri	원당리	元堂里
Cheolpa-ri	철파리	鐵坡里
Eop-ri	업리	業里
