= Uiseong County =

Coordinates: 36°21′00″N 128°41′00″E

Uiseong
- County
- Flag Emblem of Uiseong

- Location in South Korea
- Country: South Korea
- Region: Yeongnam
- Administrative divisions: 1 eup, 17 myeon

Area
  - Total: 1,175.89 km^{2} (454.01 sq mi)

Population (2002)
  - Total: 71,216
  - Density: 60.6/km^{2} (157/sq mi)
  - Dialect: Gyeongsang

Korean name
- Hangul: 의성군
- Hanja: 義城郡
- RR: Uiseong-gun
- MR: Ŭisŏng-gun

Uiseong County (Korean: 의성군) is a county in Gyeongsangbuk-do Province, South Korea. Located near the center of the province, it is bounded by Andong on the north, Cheongsong on the east, Gunwi County on the south, and Sangju and Yecheon on the west. As in most parts of Korea, most of the land is vacant and forested; only about 19% of the county's area is farmland. The county is largely rural, with an economy dominated by agriculture; the only urbanized area is the county seat, Uiseong-eup.

South Korean national treasure 77, a five-storied stone pagoda, lies in Geumseong-myeon. Also in Geumseong-myeon are a set of more than 300 dinosaur tracks from the early Cretaceous period.

Uiseong is home to Gounsa, one of the 24 head temples of the Jogye Order of Korean Buddhism. This temple is located in Danchon-myeon.

Uiseong is known for its garlic, which began cultivation since 1527 by the Gimhae and Gyeongju Choi clans. It has been accustomed to the local soil and climate, giving it a firm texture and multiple tastes (sweet, sour, salty, spicy, bitter), as well as not spoiling quickly when used to make kimchi. Uiseong garlic are also being fed to locally-raised cows, thus altering the taste of beef to be mild and savory; restaurants in the county specialize in preparing dishes with this beef.

Famous people from Uiseong include Yu Sŏngnyong, prime minister and one of the best loyal contributors during the Japanese invasions of Korea (1592–98), and the "Garlic Girls", women's curling silver medalists at the 2018 Winter Olympics.

== Administrative divisions ==
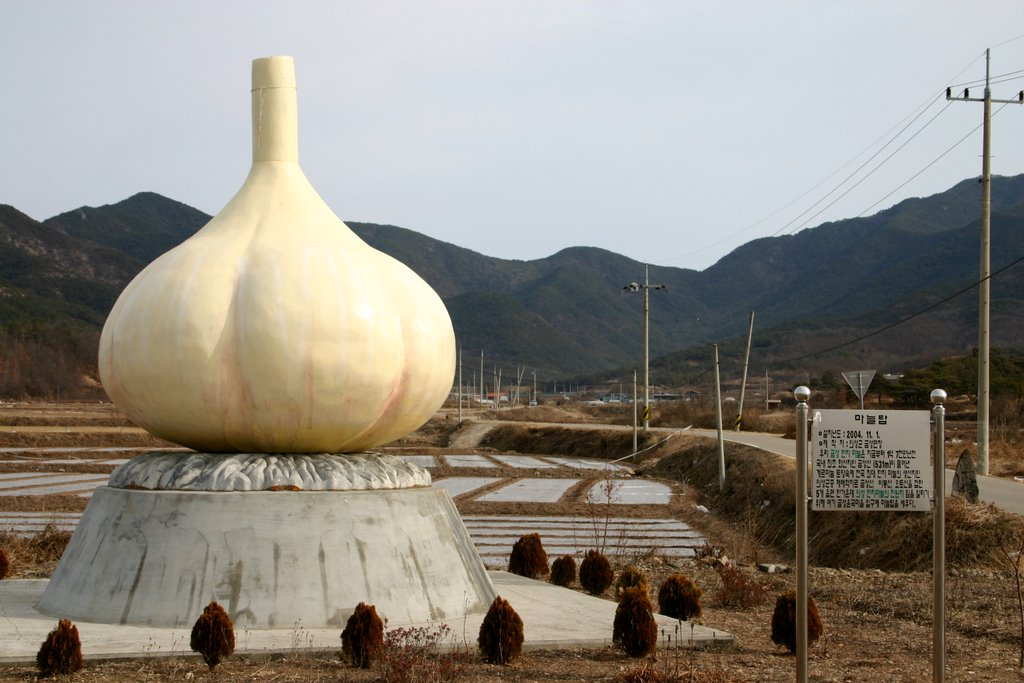
Garlic Tower at Mancheon-ri, Geumseong-myeon

Uiseong County is divided into 18 primary districts (1 eup and 17 myeon). These in turn are divided into 178 legal ri, which in turn are composed of a total of 399 administrative ri. The county's primary divisions are as follows:

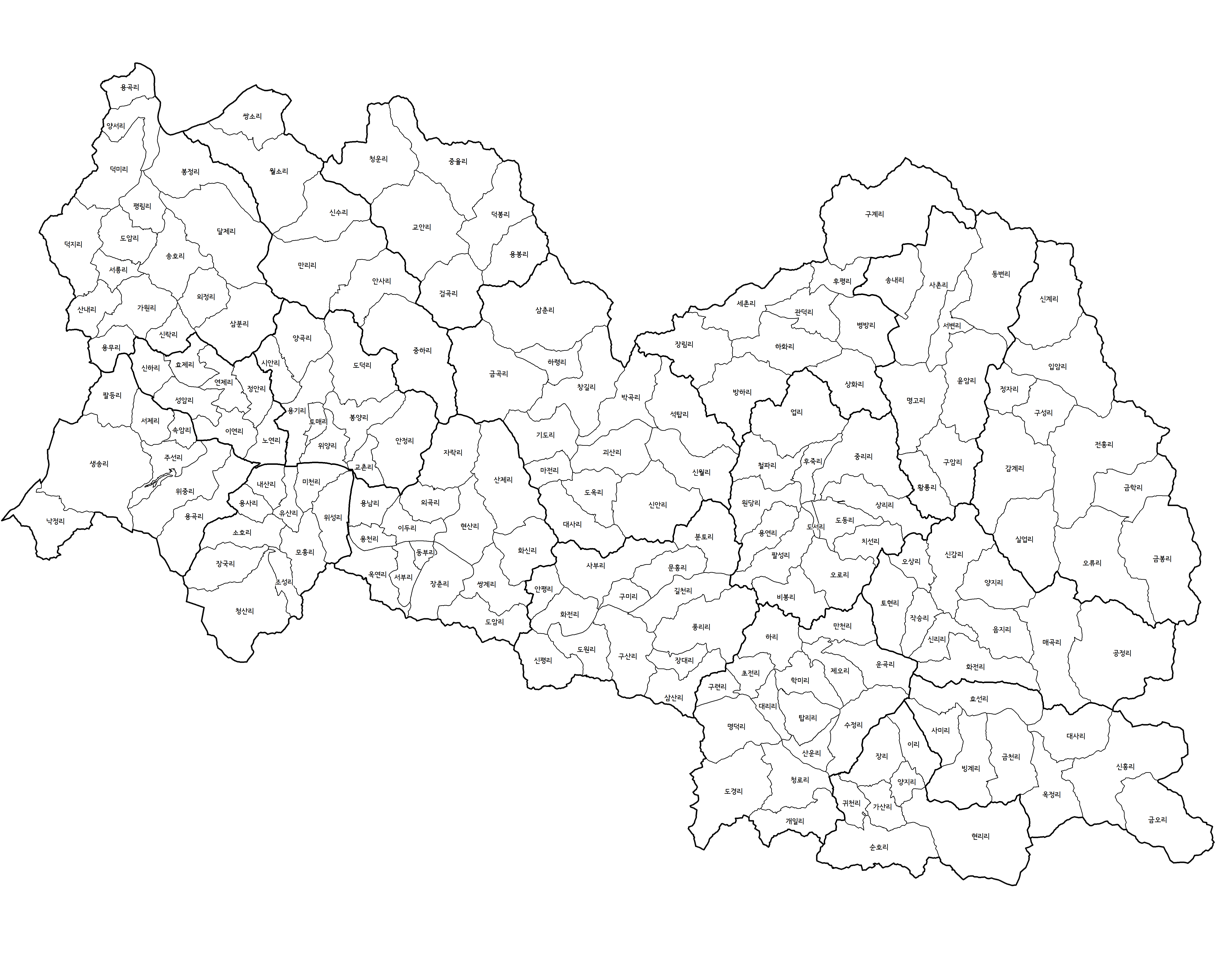
Map of legal ri of Uiseong County in Korean

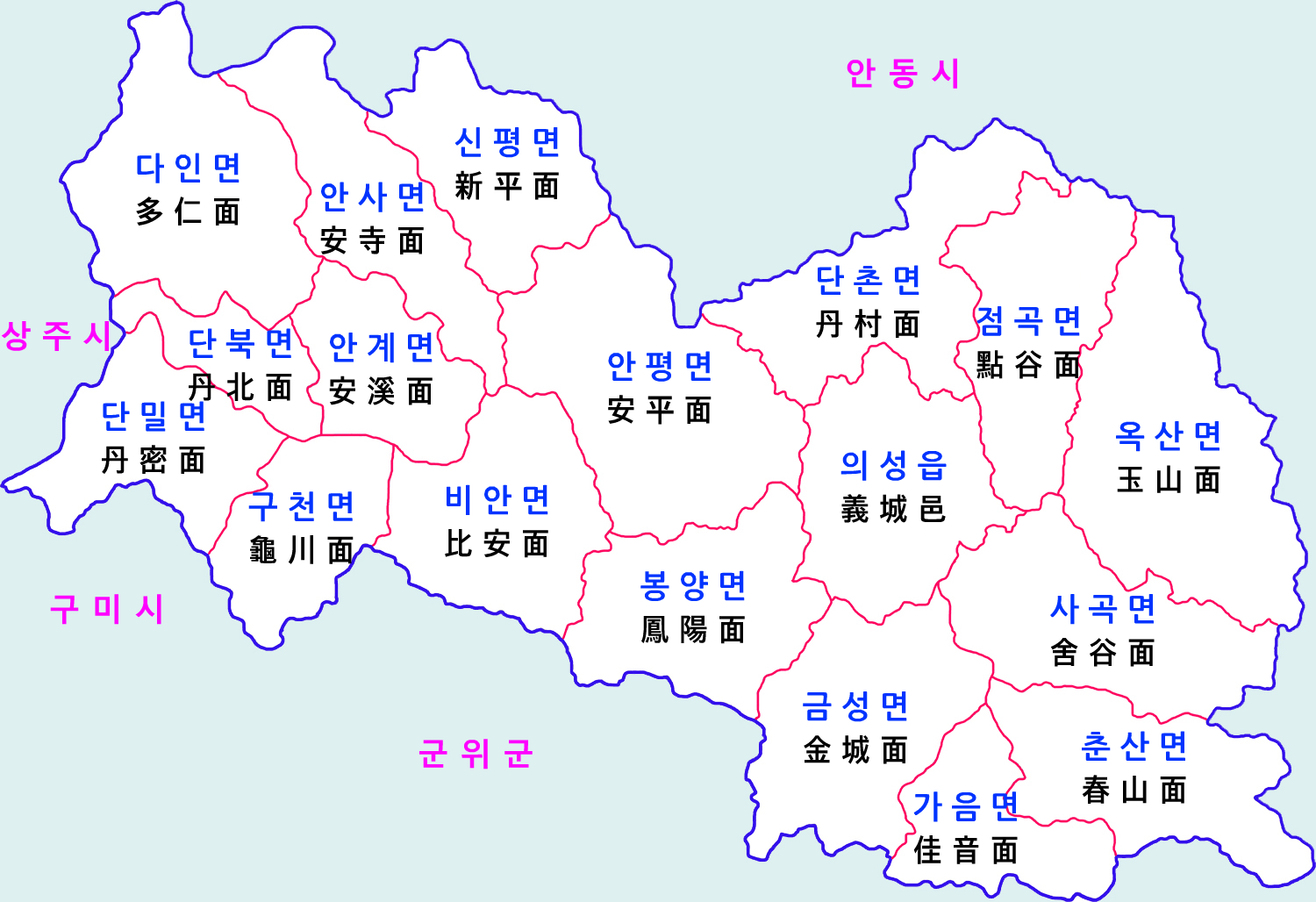
Map of Uiseong County in Korean

| Name | Hangeul | Hanja |
|---|---|---|
| Uiseong-eup | 의성읍 | 義城邑 |
| Danchon-myeon | 단촌면 | 丹村面 |
| Jeomgok-myeon | 점곡면 | 點谷面 |
| Oksan-myeon | 옥산면 | 玉山面 |
| Sagok-myeon | 사곡면 | 舍谷面 |
| Chunsan-myeon | 춘산면 | 春山面 |
| Gaeum-myeon | 가음면 | 佳音面 |
| Geumseong-myeon | 금성면 | 金城面 |
| Bongyang-myeon | 봉양면 | 鳳陽面 |
| Bian-myeon | 비안면 | 比安面 |
| Gucheon-myeon | 구천면 | 龜川面 |
| Danmil-myeon | 단밀면 | 丹密面 |
| Danbuk-myeon | 단북면 | 丹北面 |
| Angye-myeon | 안계면 | 安溪面 |
| Dain-myeon | 다인면 | 多仁面 |
| Sinpyeong-myeon | 신평면 | 新平面 |
| Anpyeong-myeon | 안평면 | 安平面 |
| Ansa-myeon | 안사면 | 安寺面 |

== Climate ==
Uiseong has a monsoon-influenced humid continental climate (Köppen: Dwa) with cold, dry winters and hot, rainy summers.

Climate data for Uiseong (1991–2020 normals, extremes 1973–present)
| Month | Jan | Feb | Mar | Apr | May | Jun | Jul | Aug | Sep | Oct | Nov | Dec | Year |
|---|---|---|---|---|---|---|---|---|---|---|---|---|---|
| Record high °C (°F) | 15.3 (59.5) | 24.1 (75.4) | 27.2 (81.0) | 33.1 (91.6) | 36.3 (97.3) | 36.5 (97.7) | 39.9 (103.8) | 40.4 (104.7) | 36.4 (97.5) | 30.2 (86.4) | 25.4 (77.7) | 18.0 (64.4) | 40.4 (104.7) |
| Mean daily maximum °C (°F) | 4.8 (40.6) | 7.8 (46.0) | 13.4 (56.1) | 20.3 (68.5) | 25.4 (77.7) | 28.6 (83.5) | 30.5 (86.9) | 31.0 (87.8) | 26.6 (79.9) | 21.4 (70.5) | 14.0 (57.2) | 6.8 (44.2) | 19.2 (66.6) |
| Daily mean °C (°F) | −3.0 (26.6) | −0.3 (31.5) | 5.3 (41.5) | 11.7 (53.1) | 17.1 (62.8) | 21.6 (70.9) | 24.8 (76.6) | 25.1 (77.2) | 19.8 (67.6) | 12.7 (54.9) | 5.5 (41.9) | −1.1 (30.0) | 11.6 (52.9) |
| Mean daily minimum °C (°F) | −9.6 (14.7) | −7.5 (18.5) | −2.2 (28.0) | 3.3 (37.9) | 9.0 (48.2) | 15.2 (59.4) | 20.3 (68.5) | 20.5 (68.9) | 14.4 (57.9) | 6.0 (42.8) | −1.2 (29.8) | −7.5 (18.5) | 5.1 (41.2) |
| Record low °C (°F) | −23.3 (−9.9) | −22.1 (−7.8) | −12.7 (9.1) | −8.4 (16.9) | −1.1 (30.0) | 4.1 (39.4) | 10.7 (51.3) | 10.3 (50.5) | 2.1 (35.8) | −7.3 (18.9) | −13.7 (7.3) | −19.2 (−2.6) | −23.3 (−9.9) |
| Average precipitation mm (inches) | 15.5 (0.61) | 22.6 (0.89) | 41.5 (1.63) | 73.6 (2.90) | 78.6 (3.09) | 115.8 (4.56) | 221.4 (8.72) | 229.6 (9.04) | 124.3 (4.89) | 41.5 (1.63) | 30.5 (1.20) | 16.3 (0.64) | 1,011.2 (39.81) |
| Average precipitation days (≥ 0.1 mm) | 4.2 | 4.7 | 6.9 | 7.5 | 8.0 | 9.0 | 13.7 | 13.7 | 9.1 | 5.3 | 5.8 | 4.7 | 92.6 |
| Average snowy days | 5.2 | 3.3 | 2.0 | 0.1 | 0.0 | 0.0 | 0.0 | 0.0 | 0.0 | 0.1 | 0.8 | 3.3 | 14.7 |
| Average relative humidity (%) | 64.8 | 61.3 | 60.1 | 57.9 | 62.1 | 67.3 | 76.2 | 76.4 | 76.3 | 73.9 | 71.1 | 67.3 | 67.9 |
| Mean monthly sunshine hours | 177.9 | 180.3 | 202.2 | 212.5 | 234.6 | 191.3 | 155.0 | 160.8 | 149.8 | 178.7 | 160.2 | 171.0 | 2,174.3 |
| Percentage possible sunshine | 57.4 | 58.0 | 54.1 | 56.5 | 53.9 | 46.0 | 36.3 | 41.7 | 42.8 | 53.6 | 52.8 | 56.2 | 50.1 |
Source: Korea Meteorological Administration (snow and percent sunshine 1981–2010)

== Festival ==
Uiseong Sansuyu Festival

Hwajeon-ri, a 15-minute walk from Uiseong Town, is a spectacular place with Sansuyu. Starting from late March, yellow flowers will bloom and bloom until mid-April, and in October, red fruit will be produced and dyed red. The Hwajeon-ri area consists of more than 30,000 trees that have grown up since the Chosun Dynasty.

== Twin towns – sister cities ==
Uiseong is twinned with:

- Yeonggwang, South Korea
- Uiryeong, South Korea
- Xianyang, China
- Mandal, Mongolia

== See also ==
- Geography of South Korea
- Subdivisions of South Korea
